= Omar Fleitas =

Spanish footballer

Personal information
- Full name: Omar José Fleitas Castellano
- Date of birth: 6 December 1991 (age 34)
- Place of birth: Fontanales, Spain
- Height: 1.78 m (5 ft 10 in)
- Position: Midfielder

Team information
- Current team: Mensajero

Youth career
- Las Palmas

Senior career*
Years	Team	Apps	(Gls)
2008	Las Palmas	1	(0)
2010–2013	Las Palmas B	92	(9)
2013	Granadilla		
2013–2014	Vecindario	11	(1)
2014–2015	Fuenlabrada	51	(2)
2015–2017	Mensajero	56	(2)
2017	Guijuelo	7	(0)
2017–2021	Mensajero	82	(12)
2021–2024	Los Llanos Aridane		
2024–2025	Arucas	12	(0)
2025–	Mensajero	2	(0)
- * Club domestic league appearances and goals as of 13 September 2025

Omar José Fleitas Castellano (born 6 December 1991), often known simply as Omar, is a Spanish footballer who plays for Tercera Federación club Mensajero as a midfielder.

== Football career ==
Born in Fontanales, Moya, Las Palmas, Canary Islands, Omar graduated from UD Las Palmas' youth system. On 15 June 2008, while still a junior, he made his professional debut, coming on as a second-half substitute in a 1–3 away loss against Albacete Balompié in the Segunda División; at the age of 16 years and 206 days, he was the youngest player ever to debut for the club, surpassing Orlando Suárez's record.

Omar was assigned to the reserves in the Tercera División, for the 2010–11 season. In July 2013, after achieving promotion to the Segunda División B, he rejected a new deal from the club, and joined Atlético Granadilla also in the fourth level on 5 August.

In October 2013, however, Omar rescinded his link and moved to fellow league team UD Vecindario. On 22 January 2014 he left, and signed an 18-month deal with CF Fuenlabrada in the third level.
