= Chito Martínez (footballer) =

Venezuelan footballer (born 1977)

Fernando Martínez
Personal information
- Full name: Fernando Rafael Martínez Silva
- Date of birth: 8 June 1977 (age 49)
- Place of birth: Puerto Ordaz, Venezuela
- Height: 1.76 m (5 ft 9 in)
- Position: Striker

Senior career*
Years	Team	Apps	(Gls)
1998	Minervén		
1999	Nueva Cádiz		
1999–2000	Estudiantes Mérida		
2000–2003	Mineros de Guayana		
2003	Uralan Elista	6	(0)
2004	Caracas FC		
2005	Deportivo Táchira		
2005–2006	Trujillanos		
2006	Deportivo Táchira		
2007	Carabobo	31	(0)
2008–2010	Llaneros de Guanare	7	(1)
2011	Los Llanos		
2013	Atlético Paso		

International career
1999–2000	Venezuela	2	(0)
- * Club domestic league appearances and goals

Fernando Rafael "Chito" Martínez Silva (born 8 June 1977) is a Venezuelan former footballer who played striker.

== Career ==
Born in Puerto Ordaz, Martínez has spent most of his career playing in Venezuelan league with Minervén, Caracas, Táchira, Mineros, Trujillanos and Llaneros.

Martínez played for Russian Premier League side FC Uralan Elista during 2003, making him the first Venezuelan to play in the league.

In 2011, Martínez moved to the Canary Islands where he would play amateur football with UD Los Llanos and CD Atlético Paso in the Preferente de Tenerife.
