= Giovanni Rodríguez =

Spanish footballer

Personal information
- Full name: Giovanni Goran Rodríguez Rivero
- Date of birth: 25 August 1998 (age 28)
- Place of birth: Candelaria, Spain
- Height: 1.66 m (5 ft 5 1/2 in)
- Position: Forward

Team information
- Current team: San Miguel

Youth career
- 2009–2016: Tenerife

Senior career*
Years	Team	Apps	(Gls)
2015–2020	Tenerife B	70	(27)
2016	Tenerife	1	(0)
2019	→ Lincoln Red Imps (loan)	11	(5)
2019–2020	→ Atlético Paso (loan)	10	(2)
2020–2021	Lanzarote	17	(4)
2021	Unión Puerto	9	(1)
2021–2022	AU Güímar		
2022	Sant Julià	2	(0)
2022	AU Güímar		
2023	Atlético Bembibre	16	(7)
2023–	San Miguel	6	(3)
- * Club domestic league appearances and goals as of 12 October 2024

Giovanni Goran Rodríguez Rivero (born 25 August 1998), sometimes known simply as Giovanni, is a Spanish footballer who plays for Tercera Federación club San Miguel as a forward.

== Club career ==
Born in Candelaria, Tenerife, Canary Islands, Rodríguez joined CD Tenerife's youth setup in 2009, aged 11. He made his senior debut with the reserves on 23 December 2015, starting in a 0–1 Tercera División away loss against rivals UD Las Palmas Atlético.

On 3 January 2016 Rodríguez scored his first senior goals, netting a brace in a 4–1 home rout of CD El Cotillo. On 20 November he made his professional debut, coming on as a late substitute for goalscorer Amath Ndiaye in a 2–1 home win against UCAM Murcia CF in the Segunda División championship.

On 11 January 2019, after falling out of favour at Tenerife, Rodríguezjoined Gibraltar Premier Division side Lincoln Red Imps on loan for the remainder of the season. He scored a hat-trick on his debut for the Imps as his side ran out 5-1 winners against rivals Gibraltar United.

Upon returning, Rodríguez was assigned back to the B-side, but after being sparingly used, he was loaned to fellow fourth division side CD Atlético Paso for the remainder of the season in December 2019.
