= Rubén Arocha =

Venezuelan footballer (born 1987)

Personal information
- Full name: Rubén Darío Arocha Hernández
- Date of birth: 21 April 1987 (age 39)
- Place of birth: Caracas, Venezuela
- Height: 1.76 m (5 ft 9 1/2 in)
- Position: Midfielder

Team information
- Current team: San Miguel

Senior career*
Years	Team	Apps	(Gls)
2005–2006	Real Madrid C	4	(1)
2006–2009	Club Brugge	0	(0)
2006	→ Union Royale Namur (loan)	4	(0)
2007	→ Martigues (loan)	1	(0)
2007–2009	→ Zamora (loan)	55	(2)
2009–2011	Zamora	59	(6)
2011–2012	Deportivo Táchira	18	(0)
2012–2013	→ Platanias (loan)	2	(0)
2013–2015	Atlético Venezuela	61	(0)
2015	Metropolitanos	17	(0)
2016	ACD Lara	15	(1)
2016–2018	Karmiotissa	38	(2)
2019	Las Zocas	13	(0)
2021	Buzanada	11	(1)
2021–2024	Las Zocas		
2024–	San Miguel	3	(0)

International career^{‡}
2006–	Venezuela	3	(0)
- * Club domestic league appearances and goals as of 12 October 2024 ‡ National team caps and goals as of 31 December 2009

Rubén Darío Arocha Hernández (born 21 April 1987) is a Venezuelan football player who plays for Tercera Federación club San Miguel.

== Club career ==
Arocha started his career in Real Madrid C, playing 4 games in which he scored one goal in that season. In 2006, he signed for Club Brugge, although he never managed to play a single game and spent three seasons loaned to several teams. The last one, Zamora, finally agreed to sign him in summer 2009.

With the squad he won the 2011 Torneo Clausura, but the team failed to complete the national title.

== Personal life ==
Born in Venezuela, Arocha is of Spanish descent through his father, who was originally from Santa Cruz de Tenerife. His son plays in the Atlético Madrid youth rank and was called up to the Spain national under-15 team.
