= Aythami Artiles =

Spanish footballer (born 1986)

Aythami
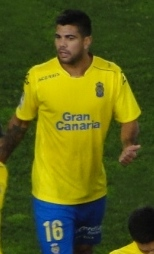
- Aythami with Las Palmas in 2015

Personal information
- Full name: Aythami Artiles Oliva
- Date of birth: 2 April 1986 (age 40)
- Place of birth: Arguineguín, Spain
- Height: 1.85 m (6 ft 1 in)
- Position: Centre-back

Team information
- Current team: Arucas

Youth career
- Arguineguín
- Las Palmas

Senior career*
Years	Team	Apps	(Gls)
2003–2004	Las Palmas B		
2004–2007	Las Palmas	92	(6)
2007–2013	Deportivo La Coruña	69	(4)
2008–2010	→ Xerez (loan)	87	(7)
2013–2018	Las Palmas	110	(5)
2018–2019	Córdoba	33	(7)
2019–2021	Las Palmas	49	(1)
2021–2022	Gimnàstic	27	(0)
2023–2024	Arguineguín		
2025	Estrella	12	(0)
2025–	Arucas	19	(4)

International career
2004–2005	Spain U19	3	(0)
- * Club domestic league appearances and goals as of 21:06, 6 October 2026 (UTC)

Aythami Artiles Oliva (born 2 April 1986), known simply as Aythami, is a Spanish professional footballer who plays as a central defender for Tercera Federación club Arucas.

== Club career ==
Aythami was born in Arguineguín, Canary Islands. After successfully representing hometown's UD Las Palmas – having started out as an attacking midfielder at his first club CD Arguineguín– he was bought in July 2007 by Deportivo de La Coruña for €600.000, signing a five-year contract. He only appeared once for the Galicians in his first year, a 0–2 home loss against Recreativo de Huelva and, in January 2008, was loaned to Xerez CD in the Segunda División.

The loan was renewed for the entire the 2008–09 season, and Aythami was an instrumental defensive element for the Andalusians, which achieved a first-ever La Liga promotion. A new loan deal was arranged for the following campaign, and he continued to be first choice, also scoring two league goals but suffering an immediate relegation.

After returning to the Estadio Riazor, Aythami experienced two relegations and one promotion with the team. The free agent re-joined Las Palmas in the summer of 2013 after agreeing to a four-year deal, contributing three goals from 37 appearances in 2014–15 (play-offs included) as the latter returned to the top tier after a 13-year absence.

On 31 January 2018, already a fringe player, Aythami returned to division two and signed with Córdoba CF until June 2020. The following 25 January, he terminated his contract and returned to Las Palmas just hours later.

Aythami signed a one-year deal with Primera División RFEF side Gimnàstic de Tarragona on 22 July 2021, having arrived for free.

== Honours ==
Xerez

- Segunda División: 2008–09

Deportivo

- Segunda División: 2011–12
