= Roberto Bolaños (footballer) =

Spanish footballer

Personal information
- Full name: Roberto Jesús Melián Bolaños
- Date of birth: 18 January 1995 (age 31)
- Place of birth: Las Palmas, Spain
- Height: 1.88 m (6 ft 2 in)
- Position: Midfielder

Team information
- Current team: Los Llanos

Youth career
- UP Hidalgo
- 2003–2014: Las Palmas

Senior career*
Years	Team	Apps	(Gls)
2014–2015	Sporting San José	20	(1)
2015–2019	Tenerife B	96	(14)
2016	Tenerife	1	(0)
2019–2020	Atlético Paso	17	(2)
2020	SS Reyes	4	(1)
2020–2023	Atlético Paso	70	(5)
2023–	Los Llanos	6	(2)
- * Club domestic league appearances and goals as of 12 October 2024

Roberto Jesús Melián Bolaños (born 18 December 1994) is a Spanish footballer who plays as an attacking midfielder for Los Llanos.

== Club career ==
Born in Las Palmas, Canary Islands, Bolaños represented Unión Pedro Hidalgo and UD Las Palmas as a youth. In 2014, he moved to Real Sporting San José, being regularly used in Tercera División.

On 2 July 2015 Bolaños joined CD Tenerife, being initially assigned to the reserves also in the fourth tier. On 26 November of the following year he made his first team debut, coming on as a late substitute for goalscorer Suso Santana in a 3–1 Segunda División away win against CD Lugo.

In June 2019, after spending the majority of the 2018–19 season nursing a knee injury, Bolaños left the Chicharreros as his contract expired. He subsequently represented fourth division side CD Atlético Paso before joining UD San Sebastián de los Reyes in Segunda División B on 24 January 2020.

In June 2020, Bolaños returned to his previous side Atlético Paso.
