= Brian Martín (footballer, born 1996) =

Spanish footballer

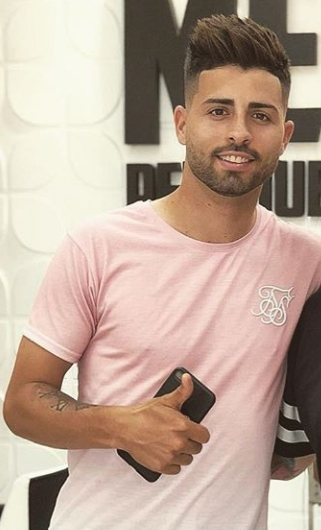
- Brian Martín

Personal information
- Full name: Brian Martín Pagés
- Date of birth: 9 April 1996 (age 30)
- Place of birth: Santa Cruz de Tenerife, Spain
- Height: 1.80 m (5 ft 11 in)
- Position: Forward

Team information
- Current team: San Miguel

Youth career
- Tenerife

Senior career*
| Years | Team | Apps | (Gls) |
| 2015–2020 | Tenerife B | 100 | (42) |
| 2017–2020 | Tenerife | 9 | (0) |
| 2018–2019 | → Melilla (loan) | 22 | (1) |
| 2020 | Östersund | 4 | (0) |
| 2020–2021 | Apollon Larissa | 0 | (0) |
| 2021 | Ejea | 15 | (0) |
| 2021–2022 | Atlético Paso | 31 | (13) |
| 2022–2023 | Gimnástica Torrelavega | 10 | (0) |
| 2023 | Xerez | 11 | (0) |
| 2023–2024 | Buzanada | 34 | (11) |
| 2024– | San Miguel | 6 | (0) |
- * Club domestic league appearances and goals as of 12 October 2024

Brian Martín Pagés (born 9 April 1996) is a Spanish footballer who plays for Tercera Federación club San Miguel. Mainly a forward, he can also play as a winger.

== Club career ==
A CD Tenerife youth graduate, Santa Cruz de Tenerife-born Martín made his senior debut with the reserves on 22 February 2015, coming on as a second-half substitute in a 0–0 Tercera División home draw against UD Telde. He scored his first goal on 11 September, netting the second in a 3–0 home win against UD Cruz Santa.

On 20 January 2017, Martín renewed his contract until 2020. On 18 August, after impressing during the pre-season, he made his professional debut by starting in a 1–0 home win against Real Zaragoza in the Segunda División championship.

On 17 July 2018, Martín was loaned to Segunda División B side UD Melilla, for one year. Upon returning, he was assigned back to the B-team, scoring a career-best 19 goals during the 2019–20 campaign.

On 14 June 2020, Martín moved abroad for the first time in his career, joining Swedish Allsvenskan side Östersunds FK. On 26 September, however, he moved to Apollon Larissa FC of the Super League Greece 2.
