= UD Las Zocas =

Las Zocas
- Full name: Unión Deportiva Las Zocas
- Founded: 1986
- Ground: Juanito Marrero, Las Zocas, Canary Islands, Spain
- Capacity: 3,000
- Chairman: (Spain) Fran Fumero
- Manager: (Spain) Cherre Bello
- League: Interinsular Preferente
- 2024–25: Interinsular Preferente, 12th of 21
Home colours	Away colours

Unión Deportiva Las Zocas is a Spanish football team based in Las Zocas, San Miguel de Abona, in the autonomous community of the Canary Islands. Founded in 1986, it plays in Interinsular Preferente, holding home games at Estadio Juanito Marrero, with a capacity of 3,000 seats.

== History ==
Las Zocas was founded in 1986, and its first president was Felix Toledo Rancel. In the 2000-01 season the club finished 14th among 20 teams in the group 12 of Tercera División. The following season Las Zocas improved its position by finishing in the first half of the standings, in the 8th position.

== Season to season ==
Season	Tier	Division	Place	Copa del Rey
1986–87	7	2ª Terr.	10th	
1987–88	7	2ª Terr.	2nd	
1988–89	7	2ª Terr.	6th	
1989–90	7	2ª Terr.		
1990–91	7	2ª Terr.	1st	
1991–92	6	1ª Terr.	11th	
1992–93	6	1ª Terr.	7th	
1993–94	6	1ª Terr.	5th	
1994–95	6	1ª Terr.	12th	
1995–96	6	1ª Terr.	2nd	
1996–97	5	Int. Pref.	3rd	
1997–98	5	Int. Pref.	3rd	
1998–99	5	Int. Pref.	3rd	
1999–2000	5	Int. Pref.	2nd	
2000–01	4	3ª	14th	
2001–02	4	3ª	8th	
2002–03	4	3ª	13th	
2003–04	4	3ª	7th	
2004–05	4	3ª	6th	
2005–06	4	3ª	14th	

Season	Tier	Division	Place	Copa del Rey
2006–07	4	3ª	8th	
2007–08	4	3ª	5th	
2008–09	4	3ª	15th	
2009–10	4	3ª	16th	
2010–11	4	3ª	16th	
2011–12	4	3ª	16th	
2012–13	4	3ª	9th	
2013–14	4	3ª	12th	
2014–15	4	3ª	16th	
2015–16	4	3ª	6th	
2016–17	4	3ª	13th	
2017–18	4	3ª	9th	
2018–19	4	3ª	20th	
2019–20	5	Int. Pref.	3rd	
2020–21	5	Int. Pref.	1st	
2021–22	5	3ª RFEF	17th	
2022–23	6	Int. Pref.	9th	
2023–24	6	Int. Pref.	6th	
2024–25	6	Int. Pref.	12th	
2025–26	6	Int. Pref.		

- 18 seasons in Tercera División
- 1 season in Tercera División RFEF

== Famous players ==
- (Spain) Cristo
