= Real Sporting San José =

Spanish football club

Sporting San José
- Full name: Real Sporting San José
- Founded: 1913
- Ground: Chano Cruz, Las Palmas, Canary Islands, Spain
- Capacity: 1,500
- Chairman: Paco Salamanca
- Manager: Julio Suárez
- League: Interinsular Preferente
- 2025–26: Interinsular Preferente, 5th of 19
Home colours	Away colours

Real Sporting San José is a Spanish football team based in Las Palmas, in the autonomous community of Canary Islands. Founded in 1913, it plays in Interinsular Preferente, holding home matches at Estadio Chano Cruz.

== Season to season ==
Season	Tier	Division	Place	Copa del Rey
1941–42	5	3ª Reg.	4th	
1942–43	5	3ª Reg.	4th	
1943–44	6	3ª Reg.	2nd	
1944–45	6	3ª Reg.	3rd	
1945–46	6	3ª Reg.	4th	
1946–47	6	3ª Reg.	5th	
1947–48	6	3ª Reg.	3rd	
1948–49	6	3ª Reg.	2nd	
1949–50	6	3ª Reg.	1st	
1950–51	5	2ª Reg.	2nd	
1951–52	5	2ª Reg.	1st	
1952–53	4	1ª Reg.	1st	
1953–54	4	1ª Reg.	5th	
1954–55	4	1ª Reg.	1st	
1955–56	4	1ª Reg.	4th	
1956–57	4	1ª Reg.	4th	
1957–58	4	1ª Reg.	7th	
1958–59	4	1ª Reg.	7th	
1959–60	4	1ª Reg.	7th	
1960–61	4	1ª Reg.	2nd	

Season	Tier	Division	Place	Copa del Rey
1961–62	4	1ª Reg.	6th	
1962–63	4	1ª Reg.	2nd	
1963–64	4	1ª Reg.	2nd	
1964–65	4	1ª Reg.	2nd	
1965–66	4	1ª Reg.	3rd	
1966–67	4	1ª Reg.	7th	
1967–68	4	1ª Reg.	1st	
1968–69	4	1ª Reg.	2nd	
1969–70	4	1ª Reg.	4th	
1970–71	4	1ª Reg.	4th	
1971–72	4	1ª Reg.	7th	
1972–73	4	1ª Reg.	6th	
1973–74	4	1ª Reg.	1st	
1974–75	4	1ª Reg.	1st	
1975–76	4	1ª Reg.	2nd	
1976–77	4	1ª Reg.	4th	
1977–78	5	Reg. Pref.	6th	
1978–79	5	Reg. Pref.	9th	
1979–80	5	Reg. Pref.	6th	
1980–81	4	3ª	6th	

Season	Tier	Division	Place	Copa del Rey
1981–82	4	3ª	15th	First round
1982–83	4	3ª	20th	
1983–84	5	Reg. Pref.	3rd	
1984–85	5	Reg. Pref.	4th	
1985–86	5	Reg. Pref.	18th	
1986–87	6	1ª Reg.	6th	
1987–88	6	1ª Reg.	11th	
1988–89	6	1ª Reg.	2nd	
1989–90	5	Int. Pref.	15th	
1990–91	6	1ª Reg.	13th	
1991–92	6	1ª Reg.	2nd	
1992–93	5	Int. Pref.	7th	
1993–94	5	Int. Pref.	6th	
1994–95	5	Int. Pref.	7th	
1995–96	5	Int. Pref.	2nd	
1996–97	5	Int. Pref.	10th	
1997–98	5	Int. Pref.	5th	
1998–99	5	Int. Pref.	13th	
1999–2000	5	Int. Pref.	18th	
2000–01	6	1ª Reg.	8th	

Season	Tier	Division	Place	Copa del Rey
2001–02	6	1ª Reg.	12th	
2002–03	6	1ª Reg.	5th	
2003–04	6	1ª Reg.	4th	
2004–05	6	1ª Reg.	5th	
2005–06	6	1ª Reg.	2nd	
2006–07	6	1ª Reg.	2nd	
2007–08	5	Int. Pref.	16th	
2008–09	5	Int. Pref.	12th	
2009–10	5	Int. Pref.	8th	
2010–11	5	Int. Pref.	1st	
2011–12	4	3ª	19th	
2012–13	5	Int. Pref.	5th	
2013–14	5	Int. Pref.	2nd	
2014–15	4	3ª	4th	
2015–16	4	3ª	18th	
2016–17	5	Int. Pref.	17th	
2017–18	6	1ª Afic.	11th	
2018–19	6	1ª Afic.	3rd	
2019–20	6	1ª Afic.	8th	
2020–21	5	Int. Pref.	5th	

Season	Tier	Division	Place	Copa del Rey
2021–22	7	1ª Afic.	4th	
2022–23	6	Int. Pref.	13th	
2023–24	7	1ª Afic.	4th	
2024–25	7	1ª Afic.	3rd	
2025–26	6	Int. Pref.		

- 6 seasons in Tercera División
