= Diego Parras =

Spanish footballer

Personal information
- Full name: Diego Marrero Parras
- Date of birth: 15 November 1995 (age 30)
- Place of birth: Las Palmas, Spain
- Height: 1.78 m (5 ft 10 in)
- Position: Right-back

Team information
- Current team: Mérida
- Number: 2

Youth career
- Heidelberg
- 2011–2013: Atlético Canarias
- 2013–2014: Arucas

Senior career*
| Years | Team | Apps | (Gls) |
| 2014–2016 | Villa Santa Brígida | 40 | (1) |
| 2016–2018 | Las Palmas B | 54 | (0) |
| 2018–2019 | Las Palmas | 0 | (0) |
| 2019 | → Murcia (loan) | 9 | (0) |
| 2020 | Melilla | 2 | (0) |
| 2020–2021 | Villanovense | 22 | (0) |
| 2021– | Mérida | 18 | (0) |
- * Club domestic league appearances and goals as of 12 December 2023

Diego Marrero Parras (born 15 November 1995) is a Spanish footballer who plays as a right back for Mérida AD.

== Club career ==
Born in Las Palmas, Canary Islands, Parras finished his formation with Arucas CF. In 2014 he joined Tercera División side UD Villa de Santa Brígida, and made his senior debut for the club during the campaign.

On 21 June 2016, Parras moved to UD Las Palmas and was assigned to the reserves also in the fourth division. He achieved promotion to Segunda División B at the end of the season, and was definitely promoted to the main squad in Segunda División on 16 August 2018.

Parras made his professional debut on 13 September 2018, starting in a 1–2 home loss against CF Rayo Majadahonda, for the season's Copa del Rey. The following 28 January, he moved to Real Murcia on loan until the end of the season.

On 2 September 2019, Parras terminated his contract with Las Palmas. He subsequently resumed his career in the third division, representing UD Melilla and CF Villanovense.

On 29 June 2021, Parras moved to Mérida AD.
