= UD Güímar =

Güímar
- Full name: Unión Deportiva Güímar
- Founded: 1942
- Dissolved: 2009
- Ground: Tasagaya, Güímar, Canary Islands, Spain
- Capacity: 3,500
- 2008–09: Primera Interinsular – Group 2, 7th of 18
Home colours

Unión Deportiva Güímar was a Spanish football team based in Güímar, in the Canary Islands. Founded in 1942 and dissolved in 2009, they last played in the Primera Interinsular – Group 2, holding home games at Estadio de Tasagaya, with a capacity of 3,500 people.

In July 2009, the club merged with CD Los Ángeles to create EMF Atlético Unión Güímar.

== Season to season ==
Season	Tier	Division	Place	Copa del Rey
1945–46	6	3ª Reg.	1st	
1946–47	5	2ª Reg.	5th	
1947–48	5	2ª Reg.	6th	
1948–49	6	3ª Reg.	3rd	
1949–50	5	2ª Reg.	2nd	
1950–51	5	2ª Reg.	3rd	
1951–52	5	2ª Reg.	3rd	
1952–53	5	2ª Reg.	1st	
1953–54	4	1ª Reg.	5th	
1954–55	4	1ª Reg.	1st	
1955–56	4	1ª Reg.	1st	
1956–57	4	1ª Reg.	2nd	
1957–58	4	1ª Reg.	7th	
1958–59	4	1ª Reg.	7th	
1959–60	4	1ª Reg.	7th	
1960–61	5	2ª Reg.	2nd	
1961–62	5	2ª Reg.	2nd	
1962–63	5	2ª Reg.	1st	
1963–64	4	1ª Reg.	15th	
1964–65	5	2ª Reg.	2nd	

Season	Tier	Division	Place	Copa del Rey
1965–66	5	2ª Reg.	1st	
1966–67	4	1ª Reg.	16th	
1967–68	5	2ª Reg.		
1968–69	5	2ª Reg.		
1969–70	5	2ª Reg.		
1970–71	5	2ª Reg.	8th	
1971–72	5	2ª Reg.		
1972–73	5	2ª Reg.	4th	
1973–74	5	2ª Reg.		
1974–75	5	2ª Reg.		
1975–76	5	2ª Reg.		
1976–77	5	2ª Reg.	2nd	
1977–78	5	1ª Reg.	2nd	
1978–79	5	Reg. Pref.	3rd	
1979–80	5	Reg. Pref.	6th	
1980–81	4	3ª	10th	
1981–82	4	3ª	2nd	
1982–83	4	3ª	4th	Third round
1983–84	4	3ª	1st	Third round
1984–85	4	3ª	3rd	Second round

Season	Tier	Division	Place	Copa del Rey
1985–86	4	3ª	7th	Second round
1986–87	4	3ª	15th	
1987–88	4	3ª	19th	
1988–89	5	Terr. Pref.	5th	
1989–90	5	Terr. Pref.	1st	
1990–91	4	3ª	15th	
1991–92	4	3ª	8th	
1992–93	4	3ª	14th	
1993–94	4	3ª	17th	
1994–95	4	3ª	17th	
1995–96	4	3ª	20th	
1996–97	5	Int. Pref.	11th	

Season	Tier	Division	Place	Copa del Rey
1997–98	5	Int. Pref.	15th	
1998–99	5	Int. Pref.	17th	
1999–2000	6	1ª Terr.	5th	
2000–01	6	1ª Terr.	12th	
2001–02	6	1ª Terr.	9th	
2002–03	6	1ª Terr.	11th	
2003–04	6	1ª Terr.	15th	
2004–05	6	1ª Int.	9th	
2005–06	6	1ª Int.	10th	
2006–07	6	1ª Int.	11th	
2007–08	6	1ª Int.	15th	
2008–09	6	1ª Int.	7th	

- 14 seasons in Tercera División
