= Roberto Bolaños =

Roberto Bolaños may refer to:

- Chespirito (Roberto Gómez Bolaños, 1929–2014), Mexican actor, comedian, screenwriter, humorist, director, producer, and author
- Roberto Bolaños (footballer) (born 1994), Spanish footballer

== See also ==
- Roberto Bolaño (1953–2003), Chilean novelist, short-story writer, poet and essayist
- Bob Bolaño, a character in the film War on Everyone
