= Yeray González =

Spanish footballer

Yeray
Personal information
- Full name: Yeray González Luis
- Date of birth: 3 April 1988 (age 38)
- Place of birth: Los Realejos, Spain
- Height: 1.81 m (5 ft 11 in)
- Position: Midfielder

Team information
- Current team: San Miguel

Youth career
- Tenerife

Senior career*
Years	Team	Apps	(Gls)
2007–2010	Tenerife C		
2010–2012	Tenerife B	69	(13)
2012–2013	Tenerife	28	(1)
2013–2014	Real Unión	35	(1)
2014–2015	Guijuelo	35	(2)
2015–2016	Hércules	34	(2)
2016–2019	Cultural Leonesa	108	(13)
2019–2021	Hércules	26	(3)
2020–2021	→ Real Murcia (loan)	17	(0)
2021–2022	Mensajero	32	(2)
2022–2023	Montijo	31	(4)
2023–2025	Marino	26	(1)
2025–	San Miguel	2	(0)
- * Club domestic league appearances and goals as of 13 September 2025

Yeray González Luis (born 3 April 1988), simply known as Yeray, is a Spanish professional footballer who plays for Tercera Federación club San Miguel as a midfielder.

== Career ==
Born in Los Realejos, Santa Cruz de Tenerife, Canary Islands, Yeray made his senior debut with CD Tenerife's C-team in the 2007–08 season, in the regional leagues. Ahead of the 2010–11 campaign, he was promoted to the reserves in Tercera División.

In July 2012, Yeray was promoted to the first team in Segunda División B by manager Álvaro Cervera. He featured regularly as his side achieved promotion to Segunda División, but after being deemed surplus to requirements, he moved to fellow third-tier club Real Unión on 19 August 2013.

Yeray continued to appear in the third division in the following campaigns, representing CD Guijuelo, Hércules CF and Cultural y Deportiva Leonesa; with the latter he achieved promotion to the second tier as champions, contributing with four goals in 40 matches (play-offs included).

Yeray made his professional debut on 18 August 2017, starting in a 0–2 away loss against Lorca FC.

== Honours ==
Cultural Leonesa

- Segunda División B: 2016–17
