= Cristo Marrero =

Spanish footballer

Personal information
- Full name: Cristo Marrero Henríquez
- Date of birth: 10 November 1978 (age 48)
- Place of birth: San Miguel, Spain
- Height: 1.66 m (5 ft 5 in)
- Position: Forward

Youth career
- 1984–1997: Las Zocas

Senior career*
Years	Team	Apps	(Gls)
1997–2001	Las Zocas		
2001–2003	Tenerife B		
2003–2009	Tenerife	164	(21)
2009–2011	Universidad LP	58	(13)
2011–2012	Las Zocas	?	(3)
- * Club domestic league appearances and goals

Cristo Marrero Henríquez (born 10 November 1978) is a Spanish former professional footballer who played as a forward.

He spent six seasons in the Segunda División with Tenerife, for whom he appeared in 169 competitive matches.

== Career ==
Born in San Miguel de Abona, Province of Santa Cruz de Tenerife, Marrero started playing football at local side UD Las Zocas, where he stayed for 17 years, never making it past the Tercera División during his four seasons as a senior.

Marrero signed with Canary Islands neighbours CD Tenerife in summer 2001, but still spent a further two years with their reserves. He made his Segunda División debut on 31 August 2003 against Deportivo Alavés, and went on to become captain.

Having featured sparingly in the 2008–09 campaign as Tenerife returned to La Liga after seven years (15 games, only one start and 174 minutes of action, one goal scored), Marrero moved teams but stayed in his native region, signing with Universidad de Las Palmas CF from Segunda División B. The club folded after two seasons, and the 32-year-old returned to Las Zocas.

In June 2012, Marrero retired from football and started a coaching career, beginning as an assistant with Tenerife B.
