= Real Unión de Tenerife =

Spanish football team in Santa Cruz de Tenerife, Canary Islands

Real Unión
- Full name: Real Unión de Tenerife
- Founded: 1915
- Ground: Estadio Municipal de La Salud, La Salud, Santa Cruz de Tenerife, Canary Islands, Spain
- Capacity: 2,500
- Sporting Director: Spain Enrique Castro
- Head Coach: Spain José Carlos Hernández
- League: Tercera Federación – Group 12
- 2025–26: Tercera Federación – Group 12, 10th of 18
- Website: https://realuniondetenerife.com/
Home colours	Away colours

Real Unión de Tenerife is a Spanish football team based in Santa Cruz de Tenerife, in the autonomous community of Canary Islands. Founded in 1915, it plays in Tercera Federación – Group 12, holding home matches at Estadio La Salud, with a 2,500-seat capacity.

== History ==
Founded in 1915, Real Unión played in regional leagues until 1980, when the club achieved a first-ever promotion to Tercera División. Relegated in 1983, the club closed their senior football department in 2024, focusing only on youth categories.

On 10 July 2025, Real Unión merged with CD Santa Úrsula, taking their place in Tercera Federación.

== Season to season ==
Season	Tier	Division	Place	Copa del Rey
1929–30	5	1ª Reg.	2nd	
1930–31	4	1ª Cat.	1st	
1931–32	4	1ª Cat.	3rd	
1932–33	4	1ª Cat.	2nd	
1933–34	4	1ª Cat.	2nd	
1934–35	4	1ª Reg.	2nd	
1935–36	4	1ª Reg.	1st	
1939–40	4	1ª Reg.	5th	
1940–41	4	1ª Reg.	2nd	
1941–42	3	1ª Reg.	1st	
1942–43	3	1ª Reg.	3rd	
1943–44	4	1ª Reg.	2nd	
1944–45	4	1ª Reg.	5th	
1945–46	5	2ª Reg.	1st	
1946–47	5	2ª Reg.	1st	
1947–48	4	1ª Reg.	2nd	
1948–49	4	1ª Reg.	3rd	
1949–50	4	1ª Reg.	6th	
1950–51	4	1ª Reg.	5th	
1951–52	4	1ª Reg.	3rd	

Season	Tier	Division	Place	Copa del Rey
1952–53	5	2ª Reg.		
1953–54	4	1ª Reg.	1st	
1954–55	4	1ª Reg.	2nd	
1955–56	4	1ª Reg.	3rd	
1956–57	4	1ª Reg.	1st	
1957–58	4	1ª Reg.	1st	
1958–59	4	1ª Reg.	1st	
1959–60	4	1ª Reg.	1st	
1960–61	4	1ª Reg.	2nd	
1961–62	4	1ª Reg.	2nd	
1962–63	4	1ª Reg.	1st	
1963–64	4	1ª Reg.	2nd	
1964–65	4	1ª Reg.	2nd	
1965–66	4	1ª Reg.	2nd	
1966–67	4	1ª Reg.	2nd	
1967–68	4	1ª Reg.	1st	
1968–69	4	1ª Reg.	3rd	
1969–70	4	1ª Reg.	3rd	
1970–71	4	1ª Reg.	5th	
1971–72	4	1ª Reg.	3rd	

Season	Tier	Division	Place	Copa del Rey
1972–73	4	1ª Reg.	9th	
1973–74	4	1ª Reg.	6th	
1974–75	4	Reg. Pref.	12th	
1975–76	5	1ª Reg.		
1976–77	4	Reg. Pref.	7th	
1977–78	5	Reg. Pref.	10th	
1978–79	5	Reg. Pref.	12th	
1979–80	5	Reg. Pref.	5th	
1980–81	4	3ª	16th	
1981–82	4	3ª	9th	
1982–83	4	3ª	14th	
1983–84	5	Terr. Pref.	13th	
1984–85	5	Terr. Pref.	12th	
1985–86	5	Terr. Pref.	10th	
1986–87	5	Terr. Pref.	5th	
1987–88	5	Terr. Pref.	6th	
1988–89	5	Terr. Pref.	3rd	
1989–90	5	Terr. Pref.	5th	
1990–91	5	Int. Pref.	7th	
1991–92	5	Int. Pref.	14th	

Season	Tier	Division	Place	Copa del Rey
1992–93	5	Int. Pref.	11th	
1993–94	5	Int. Pref.	13th	
1994–95	5	Int. Pref.	12th	
1995–96	5	Int. Pref.	11th	
1996–97	5	Int. Pref.	16th	
1997–98	6	1ª Terr.	6th	
1998–99	6	1ª Terr.	8th	
1999–2000	6	1ª Terr.	9th	
2000–01	6	1ª Terr.	8th	
2001–02	6	1ª Terr.	2nd	
2002–03	5	Int. Pref.	9th	
2003–04	5	Int. Pref.	10th	
2004–05	5	Int. Pref.	6th	
2005–06	5	Int. Pref.	7th	
2006–07	5	Int. Pref.	6th	
2007–08	5	Int. Pref.	15th	
2008–09	5	Int. Pref.	11th	
2009–10	5	Int. Pref.	16th	
2010–11	6	1ª Int.	6th	
2011–12	6	1ª Int.	2nd	

Season	Tier	Division	Place	Copa del Rey
2012–13	6	1ª Int.	6th	
2013–14	6	1ª Int.	7th	
2014–15	6	1ª Int.	9th	
2015–16	6	1ª Int.	11th	
2016–17	6	1ª Int.	11th	
2017–18	6	1ª Int.	7th	
2018–19	6	1ª Int.	14th	
2019–20	6	1ª Int.	9th	
2020–21	5	Int. Pref.	11th	
2021–22	6	Int. Pref.	10th	
2022–23	6	Int. Pref.	18th	
2023–24	7	1ª Int.	15th	
2024–25	DNP			
2025–26	5	3ª Fed.	10th	
2026–27	5	3ª Fed.		

- 3 seasons in Tercera División
- 2 seasons in Tercera Federación

== Honours ==
- Campeonato de las Islas Canarias (1): 1977.
- Copa de Canarias (1): 1948.
- Copa Heliodoro Rodríguez López (7): 1949/50, 1954/55, 1956/57, 1958/59, 1959/60, 1961/62, 1990/91.
- Teide Trophy (1): 1972.
- Torneo de San Ginés (1): 1955.
