= UD Icodense =

Icodense
- Full name: Unión Deportiva Icodense
- Founded: 16 March 1912; 114 years ago
- Ground: El Molino, Icod de los Vinos, Canary Islands, Spain
- Capacity: 4,000
- President: Juan Domingo Reyes
- Manager: David Alonso
- League: Primera Interinsular – Group 1
- 2025–26: Primera Interinsular – Group 1, 2nd of 19
Home colours	Away colours

Unión Deportiva Icodense is a Spanish football team based in Icod de los Vinos, in the autonomous community of the Canary Islands. Founded in 1912, it plays in Primera Interinsular – Group 1, holding home games at Estadio Municipal El Molino, with a capacity of 4,000 people.

== History ==
Founded on 16 March 1912 under the name of Icod Sporting Club, changing name to Icod Football Club in the 1920s. In the 1930s, another name change to Club Deportivo Icod, before being renamed to Sporting Club Icod in 1933. This name would continue until 1941, when the club returned to the name of CD Icod.

In 1945, after two years of inactivity, the club returned and was named Unión Deportiva Icodense. In 1951, the club merged with UD Granaderas and CD Centinela, and changed name to Unión Deportiva Icod. In 1956, the club returned to their previous name of UD Icodense, and would play in the regional leagues until 1983, when they achieved a first-ever promotion to Tercera División.

== Season to season ==
Season	Tier	Division	Place	Copa del Rey
1929–1949	—	Regional	—	
1949–50	5	2ª Reg.	2nd	
1950–51	5	2ª Reg.	8th	
1951–52	5	2ª Reg.	2nd	
1952–53	5	2ª Reg.	1st	
1953–54	4	1ª Reg.	9th	
1954–55	4	1ª Reg.	5th	
1955–56	DNP			
1956–57	DNP			
1957–58	DNP			
1958–59	5	2ª Reg.	3rd	
1959–60	5	2ª Reg.	3rd	
1960–61	5	2ª Reg.	3rd	
1961–62	5	2ª Reg.	1st	
1962–63	4	1ª Reg.	6th	
1963–64	4	1ª Reg.	3rd	
1964–65	4	1ª Reg.	5th	
1965–66	4	1ª Reg.	16th	
1966–67	5	2ª Reg.	4th	
1967–68	5	2ª Reg.		

Season	Tier	Division	Place	Copa del Rey
1968–69	4	1ª Reg.	9th	
1969–70	4	1ª Reg.	8th	
1970–71	4	1ª Reg.	3rd	
1971–72	4	1ª Reg.	12th	
1972–73	5	2ª Reg.	5th	
1973–74	5	2ª Reg.		
1974–75	5	2ª Reg.		
1975–76	5	2ª Reg.		
1976–77	5	2ª Reg.	1st	
1977–78	6	1ª Reg.	10th	
1978–79	7	2ª Reg.		
1979–80	7	2ª Reg.	2nd	
1980–81	6	1ª Reg.	2nd	
1981–82	5	Reg. Pref.	4th	
1982–83	5	Reg. Pref.	1st	
1983–84	4	3ª	6th	
1984–85	4	3ª	12th	Second round
1985–86	4	3ª	11th	
1986–87	4	3ª	14th	
1987–88	4	3ª	13th	

Season	Tier	Division	Place	Copa del Rey
1988–89	4	3ª	12th	
1989–90	4	3ª	19th	
1990–91	5	Int. Pref.	1st	
1991–92	4	3ª	18th	
1992–93	5	Int. Pref.	3rd	
1993–94	4	3ª	15th	
1994–95	4	3ª	16th	
1995–96	4	3ª	19th	
1996–97	5	Int. Pref.	10th	
1997–98	5	Int. Pref.	2nd	
1998–99	5	Int. Pref.	1st	
1999–2000	4	3ª	19th	
2000–01	5	Int. Pref.	4th	
2001–02	5	Int. Pref.	7th	
2002–03	5	Int. Pref.	13th	
2003–04	5	Int. Pref.	15th	
2004–05	5	Int. Pref.	8th	
2005–06	5	Int. Pref.	12th	
2006–07	5	Int. Pref.	10th	
2007–08	5	Int. Pref.	5th	

Season	Tier	Division	Place	Copa del Rey
2008–09	5	Int. Pref.	15th	
2009–10	5	Int. Pref.	15th	
2010–11	5	Int. Pref.	10th	
2011–12	5	Int. Pref.	7th	
2012–13	5	Int. Pref.	15th	
2013–14	5	Int. Pref.	12th	
2014–15	5	Int. Pref.	13th	
2015–16	5	Int. Pref.	9th	
2016–17	5	Int. Pref.	2nd	
2017–18	5	Int. Pref.	2nd	
2018–19	5	Int. Pref.	6th	
2019–20	5	Int. Pref.	4th	
2020–21	5	Int. Pref.	14th	
2021–22	6	Int. Pref.	5th	
2022–23	6	Int. Pref.	9th	
2023–24	6	Int. Pref.	11th	
2024–25	7	1ª Int.	2nd	
2025–26	7	1ª Int.		

- 12 seasons in Tercera División
