= UD Teror Balompié =

Spanish football club

Teror
- Full name: Unión Deportiva Teror Balompié
- Founded: 1956; 70 years ago
- Ground: El Pino, Teror, Canary Islands, Spain
- Capacity: 1,000
- President: Manuel González
- Manager: Aday Santana
- League: Interinsular Preferente
- 2024–25: Interinsular Preferente, 10th of 22
Home colours	Away colours

Unión Deportiva Teror Balompié is a Spanish football team based in Teror, in the autonomous community of Canary Islands. Founded in 1956, it plays in Interinsular Preferente, holding home matches at Estadio Municipal El Pino, with a capacity of 1,000 people.

== History ==
Unión Deportiva Teror was founded in 1956 after a merger between three local clubs: CD Terorense, CD Acción Católica and CD Marino de Teror, and had their headquarters at the Casino de Teror, institution which was also responsible for the administration of the club. In 1963, after splitting from the Casino, the club was renamed Unión Cultural y Deportiva de Teror.

In 2003, the club attempted to return to their original name of UD Teror, but as another club was registered under that name, the club was named Unión Deportiva Teror Balompié. In 2006, they achieved a first-ever promotion to Tercera División.

== Season to season ==
Season	Tier	Division	Place	Copa del Rey
1963–64	6	3ª Reg.	8th	
1964–65	6	3ª Reg.	7th	
1965–66	6	3ª Reg.	8th	
1966–67	6	3ª Reg.	3rd	
1967–68	5	2ª Reg.	13th	
1968–69	6	3ª Reg.	7th	
1969–70	6	3ª Reg.	8th	
1970–71	6	3ª Reg.	2nd	
1971–72	5	2ª Reg.	6th	
1972–73	5	2ª Reg.	14th	
1973–74	6	3ª Reg.	7th	
1974–75	6	3ª Reg.	6th	
1975–76	6	3ª Reg.	4th	
1976–77	6	3ª Reg.	2nd	
1977–78	7	2ª Reg.	1st	
1978–79	6	1ª Reg.	8th	
1979–80	6	1ª Reg.	7th	
1980–81	5	Reg. Pref.	14th	
1981–82	6	1ª Reg.	13th	
1982–83	7	2ª Reg.	4th	

Season	Tier	Division	Place	Copa del Rey
1983–84	7	2ª Reg.	4th	
1984–85	7	2ª Reg.	7th	
1985–86	7	2ª Reg.	4th	
1986–87	7	2ª Reg.	12th	
1987–88	7	2ª Reg.	9th	
1988–89	7	2ª Reg.	3rd	
1989–90	6	1ª Reg.	7th	
1990–91	6	1ª Reg.	15th	
1991–92	7	2ª Reg.	8th	
1992–93	7	2ª Reg.	5th	
1993–94	6	1ª Reg.	5th	
1994–95	6	1ª Reg.	6th	
1995–96	6	1ª Reg.	10th	
1996–97	6	1ª Reg.	5th	
1997–98	6	1ª Reg.	8th	
1998–99	6	1ª Reg.	7th	
1999–2000	6	1ª Reg.	11th	
2000–01	6	1ª Reg.	4th	
2001–02	6	1ª Reg.	12th	
2002–03	6	1ª Reg.	2nd	

Season	Tier	Division	Place	Copa del Rey
2003–04	6	1ª Reg.	3rd	
2004–05	5	Int. Pref.	2nd	
2005–06	5	Int. Pref.	1st	
2006–07	4	3ª	20th	
2007–08	5	Int. Pref.	7th	
2008–09	5	Int. Pref.	2nd	
2009–10	4	3ª	14th	
2010–11	4	3ª	15th	
2011–12	5	Int. Pref.	2nd	
2012–13	5	Int. Pref.	9th	
2013–14	5	Int. Pref.	3rd	
2014–15	5	Int. Pref.	9th	
2015–16	5	Int. Pref.	5th	
2016–17	5	Int. Pref.	5th	
2017–18	5	Int. Pref.	9th	
2018–19	5	Int. Pref.	2nd	
2019–20	5	Int. Pref.	6th	
2020–21	5	Int. Pref.	5th	
2021–22	6	Int. Pref.	7th	
2022–23	6	Int. Pref.	4th	

Season	Tier	Division	Place	Copa del Rey
2023–24	5	3ª Fed.	16th	
2024–25	6	Int. Pref.	10th	
2025–26	6	Int. Pref.		

- 3 seasons in Tercera División
- 1 season in Tercera Federación
