= UD Realejos =

Realejos
- Full name: Unión Deportiva Realejos
- Founded: 1943
- Ground: Los Príncipes, Los Realejos, Canary Islands, Spain
- Capacity: 3,000
- Chairman: (Spain) Juan Carlos Febles
- Manager: (Spain) Adrián Albéniz
- League: Primera Interinsular – Group 1
- 2024–25: Interinsular Preferente, 21st of 21 (relegated)
Home colours	Away colours

Unión Deportiva Realejos is a football team based in Los Realejos, in the Canary Islands. Founded in 1943, it plays in the Primera Interinsular – Group 1. Its stadium is Estadio Los Príncipes with a capacity of 3,000 seats.

== Season to season ==
Season	Tier	Division	Place	Copa del Rey
1950–51	5	2ª Reg.	2nd	
1951–52	5	2ª Reg.	1st	
1952–53	5	2ª Reg.	4th	
1953–54	4	1ª Reg.	10th	
1954–55	4	1ª Reg.	3rd	
1955–56	4	1ª Reg.	8th	
1956–57	4	1ª Reg.	6th	
1957–58	4	1ª Reg.	4th	
1958–59	4	1ª Reg.	8th	
1959–60	4	1ª Reg.	5th	
1960–61	4	1ª Reg.	5th	
1961–62	4	1ª Reg.	3rd	
1962–63	4	1ª Reg.	9th	
1963–64	4	1ª Reg.	7th	
1964–65	4	1ª Reg.	9th	
1965–66	4	1ª Reg.	3rd	
1966–67	4	1ª Reg.	8th	
1967–68	4	1ª Reg.	4th	
1968–69	4	1ª Reg.	8th	
1969–70	4	1ª Reg.	11th	

Season	Tier	Division	Place	Copa del Rey
1970–71	5	2ª Reg.	1st	
1971–72	5	2ª Reg.		
1972–73	5	2ª Reg.	3rd	
1973–74	5	2ª Reg.		
1974–75	5	2ª Reg.		
1975–76	4	Reg. Pref.	3rd	
1976–77	4	Reg. Pref.	6th	
1977–78	5	Reg. Pref.	5th	
1978–79	5	Reg. Pref.	11th	
1979–80	5	Reg. Pref.	1st	
1980–81	4	3ª	1st	
1981–82	4	3ª	3rd	First round
1982–83	4	3ª	13th	First round
1983–84	4	3ª	8th	
1984–85	4	3ª	15th	
1985–86	4	3ª	19th	
1986–87	5	Terr. Pref.	13th	
1987–88	5	Terr. Pref.	15th	
1988–89	6	1ª Terr.	1st	
1989–90	5	Terr. Pref.	2nd	

Season	Tier	Division	Place	Copa del Rey
1990–91	4	3ª	1st	
1991–92	4	3ª	7th	Second round
1992–93	4	3ª	1st	Fourth round
1993–94	3	2ª B	10th	Second round
1994–95	3	2ª B	20th	First round
1995–96	4	3ª	3rd	
1996–97	3	2ª B	19th	First round
1997–98	4	3ª	9th	
1998–99	4	3ª	14th	
1999–2000	4	3ª	15th	
2000–01	4	3ª	20th	
2001–02	5	Int. Pref.	6th	
2002–03	5	Int. Pref.	2nd	
2003–04	4	3ª	12th	
2004–05	4	3ª	16th	
2005–06	4	3ª	7th	
2006–07	4	3ª	19th	
2007–08	5	Int. Pref.	1st	
2008–09	4	3ª	10th	
2009–10	4	3ª	8th	

Season	Tier	Division	Place	Copa del Rey
2010–11	4	3ª	21st	
2011–12	5	Int. Pref.	15th	
2012–13	5	Int. Pref.	1st	
2013–14	4	3ª	19th	
2014–15	5	Int. Pref.	15th	
2015–16	6	1ª Int.	4th	
2016–17	6	1ª Int.	6th	
2017–18	6	1ª Int.	6th	
2018–19	6	1ª Int.	9th	
2019–20	6	1ª Int.	6th	
2020–21	6	1ª Int.	1st	
2021–22	6	Int. Pref.	12th	
2022–23	7	1ª Int.	3rd	
2023–24	6	Int. Pref.	10th	
2024–25	6	Int. Pref.	21st	
2025–26	7	1ª Int.		

- 3 seasons in Segunda División B
- 21 seasons in Tercera División
