= UD Guía =

Association football club in Spain

Guía
- Full name: Unión Deportiva Guía
- Nickname: Rojinegros
- Founded: 1958
- Ground: Octavio Estevez
- Capacity: 1,000
- Chairman: José Antonio Perdomo
- Manager: Iván Mendoza
- League: Primera Aficionados Gran Canaria – Group 1
- 2025–26: Segunda Aficionados Gran Canaria – Group 1, 1st of 13 (champions)
- Website: http://www.udguia.es/
Home colours	Away colours

Unión Deportiva Guía is a Spanish football club based in Santa María de Guía, Gran Canaria, in the Canary Islands. Founded in 1958, it plays in Primera Aficionados Gran Canaria – Group 1, holding home games at Estadio Octavio Estevez de Guía de Gran Canaria, with a capacity of 1,000 people.

== Season to season ==
Season	Tier	Division	Place	Copa del Rey
1958–59	6	3ª Reg.	1st	
1959–60	5	2ª Reg.		
1960–61	5	2ª Reg.	1st	
1961–62	4	1ª Reg.	2nd	
1962–63	4	1ª Reg.	5th	
1963–64	4	1ª Reg.	7th	
1964–65	4	1ª Reg.	8th	
1965–66	5	2ª Reg.		
1966–67	6	3ª Reg.	16th	
1967–68	6	3ª Reg.	8th	
1968–69	6	3ª Reg.		
1969–70	6	3ª Reg.	1st	
1970–71	5	2ª Reg.	10th	
1971–72	5	2ª Reg.	13th	
1972–73	6	3ª Reg.	2nd	
1973–74	5	2ª Reg.	3rd	
1974–75	5	2ª Reg.	3rd	
1975–76	5	2ª Reg.	1st	
1976–77	4	1ª Reg.	6th	
1977–78	5	Reg. Pref.	10th	

Season	Tier	Division	Place	Copa del Rey
1978–79	6	1ª Reg.	5th	
1979–80	5	Reg. Pref.	13th	
1980–81	5	Reg. Pref.	9th	
1981–82	5	Reg. Pref.	9th	
1982–83	5	Reg. Pref.	8th	
1983–84	5	Reg. Pref.	7th	
1984–85	5	Reg. Pref.	14th	
1985–86	5	Reg. Pref.	16th	
1986–87	6	1ª Reg.	18th	
1987–88	7	2ª Reg.	4th	
1988–89	7	2ª Reg.	2nd	
1989–90	6	1ª Reg.	10th	
1990–91	6	1ª Reg.	13th	
1991–92	6	1ª Reg.	3rd	
1992–93	6	1ª Reg.	6th	
1993–94	6	1ª Reg.	9th	
1994–95	6	1ª Reg.	2nd	
1995–96	6	1ª Reg.	3rd	
1996–97	5	Int. Pref.	6th	
1997–98	5	Int. Pref.	3rd	

Season	Tier	Division	Place	Copa del Rey
1998–99	5	Int. Pref.	9th	
1999–2000	5	Int. Pref.	8th	
2000–01	5	Int. Pref.	12th	
2001–02	5	Int. Pref.	13th	
2002–03	5	Int. Pref.	12th	
2003–04	5	Int. Pref.	16th	
2004–05	6	1ª Reg.	2nd	
2005–06	6	1ª Reg.	1st	
2006–07	5	Int. Pref.	5th	
2007–08	5	Int. Pref.	9th	
2008–09	5	Int. Pref.	6th	
2009–10	5	Int. Pref.	1st	
2010–11	4	3ª	20th	
2011–12	5	Int. Pref.	5th	
2012–13	5	Int. Pref.	10th	
2013–14	5	Int. Pref.	7th	
2014–15	5	Int. Pref.	6th	
2015–16	5	Int. Pref.	8th	
2016–17	5	Int. Pref.	10th	
2017–18	5	Int. Pref.	11th	

Season	Tier	Division	Place	Copa del Rey
2018–19	5	Int. Pref.	4th	
2019–20	5	Int. Pref.	1st	
2020–21	4	3ª	8th / 5th	Preliminary
2021–22	6	Int. Pref.	6th	
2022–23	6	Int. Pref.	6th	
2023–24	6	Int. Pref.	18th	
2024–25	7	1ª Afic.	14th	
2025–26	8	2ª Afic.	1st	
2026–27	7	1ª Afic.		

- 2 seasons in Tercera División
