= UD Orotava =

Association football club in Spain

Orotava
- Full name: Unión Deportiva Orotava
- Nickname: Los Copos de Nieve
- Founded: 9 March 1923; 103 years ago
- Ground: Los Cuartos, La Orotava, Tenerife, Canary Islands, Spain
- Capacity: 6,500
- President: Francisco Martínez
- Head coach: Javier Hernández
- League: Primera Interinsular – Group 1
- 2024–25: Primera Interinsular – Group 1, 14th of 19
Home colours	Away colours

Unión Deportiva Orotava is a Spanish football team based in La Orotava, Tenerife, in the Canary Islands. Founded on 9 March 1923, it currently plays in Primera Interinsular – Group 1, and holds home games at Estadio Municipal Los Cuartos, with a 6,500 capacity.

== History ==
Founded on 9 March 1923 under the name of Orotava Football Club, the club merged with Club de Fútbol Victoria, Club Deportivo Orotava and Club de Fútbol San Pablo, another clubs from the city, in 1944. After the merger, the club adopted the name of Unión Deportiva Orotava, but played for a few seasons in the 1940s under the name of Atlético Orotava.

After several years in the regional leagues, Orotava achieved their first-ever promotion to the Tercera División in 1980. They remained in the category for 21 consecutive seasons, winning their group in the 1993–94 season but missing out promotion in the play-offs.

Orotava suffered relegation to the Interinsular Preferente in 2001, and continued to appear mainly in the category in the following years.

== Season to season ==
Season	Tier	Division	Place	Copa del Rey
1945–46	5	2ª Reg.	1st	
1946–47	5	2ª Reg.	1st	
1947–48	5	2ª Reg.		
1948–49	5	2ª Reg.		
1949–50	6	3ª Reg.		
1950–51	5	2ª Reg.	3rd	
1951–52	5	2ª Reg.	3rd	
1952–53	5	2ª Reg.	2nd	
1953–54	4	1ª Reg.	2nd	
1954–55	4	1ª Reg.	2nd	
1955–56	4	1ª Reg.	4th	
1956–57	4	1ª Reg.	4th	
1957–58	4	1ª Reg.	2nd	
1958–59	4	1ª Reg.	5th	
1959–60	4	1ª Reg.	4th	
1960–61	4	1ª Reg.	1st	
1961–62	4	1ª Reg.	6th	
1962–63	4	1ª Reg.	7th	
1963–64	4	1ª Reg.	6th	
1964–65	4	1ª Reg.	4th	

Season	Tier	Division	Place	Copa del Rey
1965–66	4	1ª Reg.	7th	
1966–67	4	1ª Reg.	6th	
1967–68	4	1ª Reg.	7th	
1968–69	4	1ª Reg.	10th	
1969–70	5	2ª Reg.	1st	
1970–71	4	1ª Reg.	6th	
1971–72	4	1ª Reg.	1st	
1972–73	4	1ª Reg.	2nd	
1973–74	4	1ª Reg.	7th	
1974–75	4	Reg. Pref.	7th	
1975–76	4	Reg. Pref.	2nd	
1976–77	4	Reg. Pref.	2nd	
1977–78	5	Reg. Pref.	2nd	
1978–79	5	Reg. Pref.	9th	
1979–80	5	Reg. Pref.	3rd	
1980–81	4	3ª	15th	
1981–82	4	3ª	6th	
1982–83	4	3ª	7th	First round
1983–84	4	3ª	15th	
1984–85	4	3ª	6th	

Season	Tier	Division	Place	Copa del Rey
1985–86	4	3ª	12th	First round
1986–87	4	3ª	18th	
1987–88	4	3ª	11th	
1988–89	4	3ª	16th	
1989–90	4	3ª	6th	
1990–91	4	3ª	14th	Third round
1991–92	4	3ª	3rd	
1992–93	4	3ª	4th	First round
1993–94	4	3ª	1st	First round
1994–95	4	3ª	3rd	First round
1995–96	4	3ª	9th	
1996–97	4	3ª	13th	
1997–98	4	3ª	7th	
1998–99	4	3ª	2nd	
1999–2000	4	3ª	2nd	
2000–01	4	3ª	18th	Second round
2001–02	5	Int. Pref.	4th	
2002–03	5	Int. Pref.	5th	
2003–04	5	Int. Pref.	6th	
2004–05	5	Int. Pref.	18th	

Season	Tier	Division	Place	Copa del Rey
2005–06	6	1ª Int.	1st	
2006–07	5	Int. Pref.	4th	
2007–08	5	Int. Pref.	14th	
2008–09	5	Int. Pref.	14th	
2009–10	5	Int. Pref.	12th	
2010–11	5	Int. Pref.	4th	
2011–12	5	Int. Pref.	4th	
2012–13	5	Int. Pref.	7th	
2013–14	5	Int. Pref.	4th	
2014–15	5	Int. Pref.	9th	
2015–16	5	Int. Pref.	10th	
2016–17	5	Int. Pref.	3rd	
2017–18	5	Int. Pref.	7th	
2018–19	5	Int. Pref.	10th	
2019–20	5	Int. Pref.	10th	
2020–21	5	Int. Pref.	12th	
2021–22	6	Int. Pref.	3rd	
2022–23	6	Int. Pref.	12th	
2023–24	6	Int. Pref.	12th	
2024–25	7	1ª Int.	14th	

Season	Tier	Division	Place	Copa del Rey
2025–26	7	1ª Int.		

- 21 seasons in Tercera División
