= Club Europa de Nava =

Spanish football club

Europa Nava
- Full name: Club Europa de Nava
- Founded: 1921; 105 years ago
- Stadium: Estadio Municipal de Nava
- Capacity: 2,500
- President: Jonathan Jordán Corte
- Head coach: Mario Sánchez Hevia
- League: Primera Asturfútbol
- 2025–26: Primera Asturfútbol, 13th of 19
- Website: https://lafueyadeportivadenava.com/
Home colours

Club Europa de Nava is a Spanish football club based in Nava, in the autonomous community of Asturias.

== History ==
Founded in 1940, Europa promoted to Tercera División after 40 years competing, in 1980. During this golden era, with the club participating in 11 of the 13 editions of Tercera División until 1993, the club also played one edition of the Copa del Rey, being eliminated in the first round, despite achieving one draw against regional powerhouse Real Oviedo.

From 2009 to 2012, during the club's decline, Europa had a reserve team that promoted to a higher division than the main team.

== Season to season ==
| Season | Tier | Division | Place | Copa del Rey |
|---|---|---|---|---|
| 1941–42 | 4 | 2ª Reg. | | |
| 1942–43 | 4 | 2ª Reg. | | |
| 1943–44 | 5 | 2ª Reg. | | |
| 1944–45 | 5 | 2ª Reg. | | |
| 1945–46 | 5 | 2ª Reg. | | |
| 1946–47 | 5 | 2ª Reg. | | |
| 1947–48 | 5 | 2ª Reg. | | |
| 1948–49 | 5 | 2ª Reg. | | |
| 1949–50 | 5 | 2ª Reg. | | |
| 1950–51 | 5 | 2ª Reg. | | |
| 1951–52 | 5 | 2ª Reg. | | |
| 1952–53 | 5 | 2ª Reg. | | |
| 1953–54 | 5 | 2ª Reg. | | |
| 1954–55 | 5 | 2ª Reg. | | |
| 1955–56 | 5 | 2ª Reg. | | |
| 1956–57 | 5 | 2ª Reg. | | |
| 1957–58 | 5 | 2ª Reg. | | |
| 1958–59 | 5 | 2ª Reg. | | |
| 1959–60 | 5 | 2ª Reg. | 10th | |
| 1960–61 | 5 | 2ª Reg. | 10th | |

| Season | Tier | Division | Place | Copa del Rey |
|---|---|---|---|---|
| 1961–62 | 5 | 2ª Reg. | 12th | |
| 1962–63 | 5 | 2ª Reg. | 11th | |
| 1963–64 | 5 | 2ª Reg. | 13th | |
| 1964–1968 | DNP | | | |
| 1968–69 | 5 | 2ª Reg. | 9th | |
| 1969–70 | 5 | 2ª Reg. | 2nd | |
| 1970–71 | 5 | 2ª Reg. | 8th | |
| 1971–72 | 5 | 2ª Reg. | 1st | |
| 1972–73 | 5 | 2ª Reg. | 14th | |
| 1973–74 | 5 | 2ª Reg. P. | 17th | |
| 1974–75 | 5 | 2ª Reg. P. | 4th | |
| 1975–76 | 5 | 2ª Reg. P. | 4th | |
| 1976–77 | 5 | 2ª Reg. P. | 13th | |
| 1977–78 | 6 | 2ª Reg. P. | 3rd | |
| 1978–79 | 5 | Reg. Pref. | 4th | |
| 1979–80 | 5 | Reg. Pref. | 4th | |
| 1980–81 | 4 | 3ª | 11th | |
| 1981–82 | 4 | 3ª | 5th | |
| 1982–83 | 4 | 3ª | 19th | First round |
| 1983–84 | 4 | 3ª | 11th | |

| Season | Tier | Division | Place | Copa del Rey |
|---|---|---|---|---|
| 1984–85 | 4 | 3ª | 18th | |
| 1985–86 | 5 | Reg. Pref. | 6th | |
| 1986–87 | 4 | 3ª | 11th | |
| 1987–88 | 4 | 3ª | 4th | |
| 1988–89 | 4 | 3ª | 16th | |
| 1989–90 | 4 | 3ª | 13th | |
| 1990–91 | 4 | 3ª | 18th | |
| 1991–92 | 5 | Reg. Pref. | 2nd | |
| 1992–93 | 4 | 3ª | 20th | |
| 1993–94 | 5 | Reg. Pref. | 12th | |
| 1994–95 | 5 | Reg. Pref. | 7th | |
| 1995–96 | 5 | Reg. Pref. | 8th | |
| 1996–97 | 5 | Reg. Pref. | 6th | |
| 1997–98 | 5 | Reg. Pref. | 3rd | |
| 1998–99 | 4 | 3ª | 16th | |
| 1999–2000 | 5 | Reg. Pref. | 5th | |
| 2000–01 | 5 | Reg. Pref. | 12th | |
| 2001–02 | 5 | Reg. Pref. | 19th | |
| 2002–03 | 6 | 1ª Reg. | 16th | |
| 2003–04 | 7 | 2ª Reg. | 8th | |

| Season | Tier | Division | Place | Copa del Rey |
|---|---|---|---|---|
| 2004–05 | 7 | 2ª Reg. | 14th | |
| 2005–06 | 7 | 2ª Reg. | 3rd | |
| 2006–07 | 7 | 2ª Reg. | 4th | |
| 2007–08 | 7 | 2ª Reg. | 12th | |
| 2008–09 | 7 | 2ª Reg. | 2nd | |
| 2009–10 | 7 | 2ª Reg. | 1st (Note: Results from 2009 to 2012 referred to the B-side of the club, that obtained better results and competed two seasons in a higher division.) | |
| 2010–11 | 6 | 1ª Reg. | 9th | |
| 2011–12 | 6 | 1ª Reg. | 16th | |
| 2012–13 | 7 | 2ª Reg. | 6th | |
| 2013–14 | 7 | 2ª Reg. | 12th | |
| 2014–15 | 7 | 2ª Reg. | 6th | |
| 2015–16 | 7 | 2ª Reg. | 6th | |
| 2016–17 | 7 | 2ª Reg. | 7th | |
| 2017–18 | 7 | 2ª Reg. | 3rd | |
| 2018–19 | 7 | 2ª Reg. | 1st | |
| 2019–20 | 6 | 1ª Reg. | 4th | |
| 2020–21 | 6 | 1ª Reg. | 1st | |
| 2021–22 | 6 | Reg. Pref. | 11th | |
| 2022–23 | 7 | 2ª RFFPA | 13th | |
| 2023–24 | 7 | 2ª Astur. | 3rd | |

| Season | Tier | Division | Place | Copa del Rey |
|---|---|---|---|---|
| 2024–25 | 7 | 2ª Astur. | 1st | |
| 2025–26 | 6 | 1ª Astur. | | |

- 12 seasons in Tercera División
