= CD Rota =

Association football club in Spain

- Full name: Club Deportivo Rota
- Nickname: Aviadores
- Founded: 1952
- Ground: Alcalde Navarro Flores, Rota, Cádiz, Andalusia, Spain
- Capacity: 5,000
- Chairman: Juan Luis Rendón
- Manager: Jero Osorio
- League: Primera Andaluza Cádiz
- 2025–26: Primera Andaluza Cádiz, 9th of 16
Home colours	Away colours

Club Deportivo Rota is a Spanish football team based in Rota, Cádiz, in the autonomous community of Andalusia. Founded in 1976, it currently plays in Primera Andaluza Cádiz, holding home matches at Estadio Municipal Alcalde Navarro Flores, with a capacity of 5,000 spectators.

== Season to season ==
Season	Tier	Division	Place	Copa del Rey
1952–1965	—	Regional	—	
1965–66	4	1ª Reg.	1st	
1966–67	3	3ª	14th	
1967–68	3	3ª	10th	
1968–69	3	3ª	16th	
1969–70	3	3ª	20th	
1970–71	4	1ª Reg.	3rd	
1971–72	4	1ª Reg.	5th	
1972–73	4	1ª Reg.	7th	
1973–74	4	1ª Reg.	8th	
1974–75	4	1ª Reg.	8th	
1975–76	4	Reg. Pref.	19th	
1976–77	5	1ª Reg.	2nd	
1977–78	5	Reg. Pref.	2nd	
1978–79	4	3ª	11th	
1979–80	4	3ª	4th	
1980–81	4	3ª	11th	
1981–82	4	3ª	14th	
1982–83	4	3ª	11th	
1983–84	4	3ª	8th	

Season	Tier	Division	Place	Copa del Rey
1984–85	4	3ª	14th	
1985–86	4	3ª	13th	
1986–87	4	3ª	16th	
1987–88	4	3ª	17th	
1988–89	4	3ª	13th	
1989–90	4	3ª	19th	
1990–91	5	Reg. Pref.	3rd	
1991–92	5	Reg. Pref.	1st	
1992–93	4	3ª	19th	
1993–94	5	Reg. Pref.	4th	
1994–95	5	Reg. Pref.	1st	
1995–96	4	3ª	11th	
1996–97	4	3ª	11th	
1997–98	4	3ª	10th	
1998–99	4	3ª	13th	
1999–2000	4	3ª	19th	
2000–01	5	Reg. Pref.	8th	
2001–02	5	Reg. Pref.	11th	
2002–03	5	Reg. Pref.	5th	
2003–04	5	Reg. Pref.	10th	

Season	Tier	Division	Place	Copa del Rey
2004–05	5	1ª And.	14th	
2005–06	6	Reg. Pref.	4th	
2006–07	6	Reg. Pref.	2nd	
2007–08	5	1ª And.	9th	
2008–09	5	1ª And.	4th	
2009–10	5	1ª And.	11th	
2010–11	5	1ª And.	6th	
2011–12	5	1ª And.	12th	
2012–13	5	1ª And.	7th	
2013–14	5	1ª And.	3rd	
2014–15	5	1ª And.	3rd	
2015–16	5	1ª And.	3rd	
2016–17	5	Div. Hon.	14th	
2017–18	5	Div. Hon.	11th	
2018–19	5	Div. Hon.	2nd	
2019–20	4	3ª	9th	
2020–21	4	3ª	5th / 4th	
2021–22	5	3ª RFEF	11th	
2022–23	5	3ª Fed.	16th	
2023–24	6	Div. Hon.	13th	

Season	Tier	Division	Place	Copa del Rey
2024–25	7	1ª And.	4th	
2025–26	7	1ª And.	9th	
2026–27	7	1ª And.		

- 24 seasons in Tercera División
- 1 season in Tercera División RFEF
