= EMF Atlético Unión Güímar =

Atlético Unión Güímar
- Full name: Escuela Municipal de Fútbol Atlético Unión Güímar
- Nickname: Güimar
- Founded: 2009
- Ground: Tasagaya, Güímar, Tenerife, Canary Islands, Spain
- Capacity: 3,500
- President: Carlos Francisco Romero
- Manager: Juan Alonso
- League: Interinsular Preferente
- 2025–26: Interinsular Preferente, 5th of 20
Home colours	Away colours

Escuela Municipal de Fútbol Atlético Unión Güímar is a Spanish football team based in Güímar, in Tenerife,Canary Islands. They play in the Interinsular Preferente, holding home games at Estadio municipal de Tasagaya, with a capacity of aprox 3,500 people.

== History ==
Founded in July 2009, after a merger between CD Los Ángeles and UD Güímar, the club first reached Tercera División in 2017. After a four-season spell in the category, Atlético Unión Güímar suffered relegation in the 2020–21 campaign.

During the 2024–25 season, AU Güímar was eliminated in the Interinsular Preferente promotion play-offs.

== Season to season ==
Season	Tier	Division	Place	Copa del Rey
2009–10	6	1ª Int.	2nd	
2010–11	6	1ª Int.	3rd	
2011–12	6	1ª Int.	4th	
2012–13	6	1ª Int.	2nd	
2013–14	5	Int. Pref.	13th	
2014–15	5	Int. Pref.	10th	
2015–16	5	Int. Pref.	6th	
2016–17	5	Int. Pref.	1st	
2017–18	4	3ª	14th	
2018–19	4	3ª	11th	
2019–20	4	3ª	17th	
2020–21	4	3ª	10th / 9th	
2021–22	6	Int. Pref.	3rd	
2022–23	6	Int. Pref.	2nd	
2023–24	6	Int. Pref.	3rd	
2024–25	6	Int. Pref.	4th	
2025–26	6	Int. Pref.	5th	
2026–27	6	Int. Pref.		Preliminary

- 4 seasons in Tercera División
