= CD Arguineguín =

Spanish football team

Arguineguín
- Full name: Club Deportivo Arguineguín
- Founded: 1968
- Ground: Estadio Municipal, Arguineguín, Spain
- Capacity: 2,500
- Chairman: (Spain) Armando Jiménez
- Manager: (Spain) Jero Santana
- League: Primera Aficionados Gran Canaria – Group 2
- 2024–25: Interinsular Preferente, 20th of 22 (relegated)
Home colours	Away colours

Club Deportivo Arguineguín is a football team based in Arguineguín, Canary Islands. Founded in 1968, the team plays in Primera Aficionados Gran Canaria – Group 2. The club's home ground is Estadio Municipal.

== Season to season ==
Season	Tier	Division	Place	Copa del Rey
1974–75	6	3ª Reg.	9th	
1975–76	6	3ª Reg.	1st	
1976–77	5	2ª Reg.	13th	
1977–78	6	1ª Reg.	9th	
1978–79	6	1ª Reg.	6th	
1979–80	6	1ª Reg.	3rd	
1980–81	5	Reg. Pref.	6th	
1981–82	5	Reg. Pref.	5th	
1982–83	5	Reg. Pref.	14th	
1983–84	6	1ª Reg.	11th	
1984–85	6	1ª Reg.	10th	
1985–86	6	1ª Reg.	3rd	
1986–87	6	1ª Reg.	1st	
1987–88	5	Int. Pref.	2nd	
1988–89	4	3ª	14th	
1989–90	4	3ª	8th	
1990–91	4	3ª	7th	
1991–92	4	3ª	6th	
1992–93	4	3ª	9th	
1993–94	4	3ª	7th	

Season	Tier	Division	Place	Copa del Rey
1994–95	4	3ª	11th	
1995–96	4	3ª	12th	
1996–97	4	3ª	18th	
1997–98	5	Int. Pref.	10th	
1998–99	5	Int. Pref.	4th	
1999–2000	5	Int. Pref.	4th	
2000–01	5	Int. Pref.	10th	
2001–02	5	Int. Pref.	14th	
2002–03	5	Int. Pref.	17th	
2003–04	6	1ª Reg.	9th	
2004–05	6	1ª Reg.	6th	
2005–06	6	1ª Reg.	1st	
2006–07	5	Int. Pref.	10th	
2007–08	5	Int. Pref.	2nd	
2008–09	4	3ª	19th	
2009–10	5	Int. Pref.	4th	
2010–11	5	Int. Pref.	7th	
2011–12	5	Int. Pref.	9th	
2012–13	5	Int. Pref.	3rd	
2013–14	5	Int. Pref.	16th	

Season	Tier	Division	Place	Copa del Rey
2014–15	6	1ª Afic.	4th	
2015–16	6	1ª Afic.	7th	
2016–17	6	1ª Afic.	8th	
2017–18	6	1ª Afic.	3rd	
2018–19	6	1ª Afic.	1st	
2019–20	5	Int. Pref.	11th	
2020–21	5	Int. Pref.	8th	
2021–22	6	Int. Pref.	9th	
2022–23	6	Int. Pref.	7th	
2023–24	6	Int. Pref.	10th	
2024–25	6	Int. Pref.	20th	
2025–26	7	1ª Afic.		

- 10 seasons in Tercera División
