= CD Atlético Granadilla =

Atlético Granadilla
- Full name: Club Deportivo Atlético Granadilla
- Founded: 1959
- Ground: Francisco Suárez, Granadilla, Canary Islands, Spain
- Capacity: 2,000
- Chairman: (Spain) Jose Luis Fernandez
- Manager: (Spain) Antonio Garcia Ayala
- League: Primera Interinsular – Group 2
- 2024–25: Primera Interinsular – Group 2, 7th of 19
Home colours	Away colours

Club Deportivo Atlético Granadilla is a semi-professional Spanish football team located in Granadilla de Abona, on the island of Tenerife in the autonomous community of the Canary Islands. Founded in 1959, the club currently competes in Group 3 of the Interinsular Preferente de Tenerife, the sixth tier of the Spanish football league system. It plays its home games at Estadio Francisco Suárez, which has a capacity of 2,000.

== Season to season ==
Season	Tier	Division	Place	Copa del Rey
1962–63	5	2ª Reg.	12th	
1963–64	5	2ª Reg.	3rd	
1964–65	5	2ª Reg.	6th	
1965–66	5	2ª Reg.	6th	
1966–67	5	2ª Reg.		
1967–68	5	2ª Reg.		
1968–69	5	2ª Reg.	3rd	
1969–70	5	2ª Reg.	2nd	
1970–71	5	2ª Reg.	3rd	
1971–72	5	2ª Reg.		
1972–73	5	2ª Reg.	1st	
1973–74	4	1ª Reg.	11th	
1974–75	5	2ª Reg.		
1975–76	4	Reg. Pref.	5th	
1976–77	4	Reg. Pref.	12th	
1977–78	6	1ª Reg.	12th	
1978–79	7	2ª Reg.		
1979–80	7	2ª Reg.	4th	
1980–81	6	1ª Reg.	8th	
1981–82	6	1ª Reg.	5th	

Season	Tier	Division	Place	Copa del Rey
1982–83	6	1ª Reg.	1st	
1983–84	5	Terr. Pref.	3rd	
1984–85	5	Terr. Pref.	5th	
1985–86	5	Terr. Pref.	13th	
1986–87	5	Terr. Pref.	10th	
1987–88	5	Terr. Pref.	13th	
1988–89	5	Terr. Pref.	16th	
1989–90	5	Terr. Pref.	13th	
1990–91	DNP			
1991–92	DNP			
1992–93	7	2ª Terr.	3rd	
1993–94	6	1ª Terr.	4th	
1994–95	6	1ª Terr.	5th	
1995–96	6	1ª Terr.	7th	
1996–97	6	1ª Terr.	5th	
1997–98	6	1ª Terr.	9th	
1998–99	6	1ª Terr.	2nd	
1999–2000	5	Int. Pref.	12th	
2000–01	5	Int. Pref.	10th	
2001–02	5	Int. Pref.	3rd	

Season	Tier	Division	Place	Copa del Rey
2002–03	5	Int. Pref.	8th	
2003–04	5	Int. Pref.	4th	
2004–05	5	Int. Pref.	2nd	
2005–06	4	3ª	4th	
2006–07	4	3ª	12th	
2007–08	4	3ª	1st	
2008–09	4	3ª	8th	First round
2009–10	4	3ª	6th	
2010–11	4	3ª	4th	
2011–12	4	3ª	6th	
2012–13	4	3ª	2nd	
2013–14	4	3ª	1st	First round
2014–15	4	3ª	12th	First round
2015–16	4	3ª	20th	
2016–17	5	Int. Pref.	5th	
2017–18	5	Int. Pref.	13th	
2018–19	5	Int. Pref.	12th	
2019–20	5	Int. Pref.	11th	
2020–21	5	Int. Pref.	12th	
2021–22	6	Int. Pref.	11th	

Season	Tier	Division	Place	Copa del Rey
2022–23	7	1ª Int.	4th	
2023–24	7	1ª Int.	8th	
2024–25	7	1ª Int.	7th	
2025–26	7	1ª Int.		

- 11 seasons in Tercera División

== See also ==
- Spanish football league system
