= 1980–81 Tercera División =

Tercera División
- Season: 1980–81
- Champions: 13 teams
- Promoted: 6 teams
- Relegated: 38 teams
- Matches played: 4,940

The 1980–81 Tercera División season was the 4th season since establishment as the 4th tier.

== League tables ==
=== Group I ===
Pos	Team	Pld	W	D	L	GF	GA	GD	Pts
1	Lugo	38	24	11	3	73	15	+58	59
2	Arosa	38	26	6	6	83	28	+55	58
3	Gran Peña	38	22	10	6	57	30	+27	54
4	Alondras	38	20	7	11	66	42	+24	47
5	Ourense	38	17	12	9	53	29	+24	46
6	Vista Alegre	38	18	10	10	52	36	+16	46
7	Juventud de Cambados	38	15	9	14	54	53	+1	39
8	Arenteiro	38	15	8	15	46	49	−3	38
9	Porriño Industrial	38	12	14	12	51	60	−9	38
10	Fabril Deportivo	38	13	10	15	54	46	+8	36
11	San Martín	38	12	11	15	39	48	−9	35
12	Atlético Riveira	38	11	11	16	34	41	−7	33
13	Finisterre	38	11	11	16	41	62	−21	33
14	Lemos	38	11	10	17	34	46	−12	32
15	Flavia	38	11	8	19	44	61	−17	30
16	Turista	38	9	11	18	32	41	−9	29
17	Choco	38	11	7	20	38	64	−26	29
18	Noia	38	8	12	18	30	54	−24	28
19	Céltiga	38	9	9	20	35	67	−32	27
20	Boiro	38	7	9	22	33	77	−44	23

=== Group II ===
Pos	Team	Pld	W	D	L	GF	GA	GD	Pts
1	Sporting de Gijón Atlético	38	22	9	7	73	26	+47	53
2	Santoña	38	19	10	9	49	28	+21	48
3	Caudal	38	20	8	10	61	40	+21	48
4	Deportiva Piloñesa	38	17	11	10	55	49	+6	45
5	Gijón Industrial	38	17	10	11	56	39	+17	44
6	Naval	38	15	11	12	46	34	+12	41
7	Turón	38	15	11	12	46	40	+6	41
8	Cayón	38	16	8	14	44	39	+5	40
9	Real Avilés	38	16	8	14	52	50	+2	40
10	Siero	38	15	8	15	56	47	+9	38
11	Europa de Nava	38	15	8	15	42	42	0	38
12	Castro	38	15	6	17	49	47	+2	36
13	San Martín	38	14	8	16	48	50	−2	36
14	Titánico	38	13	10	15	35	52	−17	36
15	Unión Club	38	15	4	19	58	82	−24	34
16	Real Oviedo Aficionado	38	11	11	16	53	67	−14	33
17	Barreda	38	10	12	16	41	61	−20	32
18	Rayo Cantabria	38	10	12	16	46	50	−4	32
19	El Entrego	38	8	10	20	32	57	−25	26
20	San Martín Arena	38	7	5	26	31	73	−42	19

=== Group III ===
Pos	Team	Pld	W	D	L	GF	GA	GD	Pts
1	Erandio	38	21	13	4	54	26	+28	55
2	Arenas de Getxo	38	19	11	8	52	34	+18	49
3	Eibar	38	19	11	8	66	32	+34	49
4	Aurrerá de Ondarroa	38	16	15	7	49	35	+14	47
5	Lagun Onak	38	15	16	7	55	37	+18	46
6	Anaitasuna	38	18	8	12	55	42	+13	44
7	Balmaseda	38	17	6	15	45	38	+7	40
8	Bergara	38	12	16	10	46	42	+4	40
9	Real Unión	38	13	13	12	55	63	−8	39
10	Alavés Aficionados	38	12	13	13	52	45	+7	37
11	Zorrotza	38	11	14	13	46	47	−1	36
12	Mungia	38	10	15	13	45	50	−5	35
13	Deusto	38	10	13	15	37	54	−17	33
14	Getxo	38	11	10	17	40	50	−10	32
15	Santutxu	38	12	8	18	48	67	−19	32
16	Gernika	38	9	13	16	29	39	−10	31
17	Tolosa	38	8	15	15	33	43	−10	31
18	Lemona	38	12	7	19	38	56	−18	31
19	Mutriku	38	10	8	20	43	59	−16	28
20	Elorrio	38	8	9	21	31	60	−29	25

=== Group IV ===
Pos	Team	Pld	W	D	L	GF	GA	GD	Pts
1	Binéfar	38	24	6	8	79	32	+47	54
2	Endesa Andorra	38	21	11	6	64	36	+28	53
3	Deportivo Aragón	38	23	7	8	61	36	+25	53
4	Tudelano	38	18	12	8	53	36	+17	48
5	Peña Sport	38	18	9	11	63	51	+12	45
6	Sangüesa	38	16	12	10	56	42	+14	44
7	Ejea	38	16	11	11	56	38	+18	43
8	Sabiñánigo	38	15	11	12	57	48	+9	41
9	Tarazona	38	16	8	14	54	45	+9	40
10	Osasuna Promesas	38	15	9	14	56	37	+19	39
11	Arnedo	38	13	11	14	55	60	−5	37
12	Corellano	38	14	8	16	45	48	−3	36
13	Numancia	38	12	11	15	48	51	−3	35
14	Calahorra	38	14	6	18	52	66	−14	34
15	Atlético Monzón	38	9	15	14	49	61	−12	33
16	Chantrea	38	8	12	18	46	72	−26	28
17	Burladés	38	10	7	21	43	64	−21	27
18	Utrillas	38	9	9	20	38	66	−28	27
19	Almazán	38	5	14	19	33	75	−42	24
20	Haro	38	5	9	24	28	72	−44	19

=== Group V ===
Pos	Team	Pld	W	D	L	GF	GA	GD	Pts
1	Reus	38	22	9	7	62	26	+36	53
2	Figueres	38	20	12	6	68	33	+35	52
3	Badalona	38	22	7	9	76	41	+35	51
4	Vilafranca	38	18	11	9	67	47	+20	47
5	FC Barcelona Aficionados	38	15	13	10	59	51	+8	43
6	Júpiter	38	16	11	11	57	44	+13	43
7	Girona	38	17	9	12	63	45	+18	43
8	L'Hospitalet	38	14	13	11	47	43	+4	41
9	Sant Andreu	38	15	9	14	66	52	+14	39
10	Igualada	38	14	11	13	40	34	+6	39
11	Olot	38	15	8	15	43	52	−9	38
12	Mataró	38	14	9	15	37	47	−10	37
13	La Cava	38	12	9	17	55	55	0	33
14	Malgrat	38	13	6	19	48	63	−15	32
15	Gavà	38	12	8	18	44	65	−21	32
16	Canovelles	38	10	11	17	41	57	−16	31
17	Europa	38	9	12	17	50	62	−12	30
18	Horta	38	10	7	21	36	65	−29	27
19	Gramenet	38	7	12	19	46	84	−38	26
20	Masnou	38	7	9	22	34	73	−39	23

=== Group VI ===
Pos	Team	Pld	W	D	L	GF	GA	GD	Pts
1	Catarroja	38	22	8	8	73	47	+26	52
2	Carcaixent	38	21	7	10	51	34	+17	49
3	Dénia	38	18	10	10	61	44	+17	46
4	Puçol	38	16	14	8	59	44	+15	46
5	Alcoyano	38	18	9	11	53	35	+18	45
6	Gandía	38	18	9	11	59	41	+18	45
7	Alzira	38	14	12	12	53	48	+5	40
8	Mestalla	38	13	12	13	59	44	+15	38
9	Vinaròs	38	16	6	16	53	51	+2	38
10	Alicante	38	12	13	13	44	41	+3	37
11	Ontinyent	38	12	13	13	35	41	−6	37
12	Olímpic de Xàtiva	38	12	13	13	37	52	−15	37
13	Novelda	38	15	6	17	51	54	−3	36
14	Quart de Poblet	38	12	12	14	47	57	−10	36
15	Paterna	38	11	13	14	45	52	−7	35
16	Villarreal	38	12	10	16	59	60	−1	34
17	Español de San Vicente	38	11	10	17	45	52	−7	32
18	Villena	38	10	9	19	43	60	−17	29
19	Crevillente	38	9	8	21	41	76	−35	26
20	Acero	38	9	4	25	46	81	−35	22

=== Group VII ===
Pos	Team	Pld	W	D	L	GF	GA	GD	Pts
1	Real Aranjuez	38	24	8	6	83	38	+45	56
2	Colonia Moscardó	38	19	12	7	59	43	+16	50
3	Manchego	38	18	11	9	69	34	+35	47
4	Parla	38	18	11	9	55	48	+7	47
5	Alcorcón	38	17	12	9	68	42	+26	46
6	Leganés	38	17	11	10	66	46	+20	45
7	Valdepeñas	38	14	13	11	58	52	+6	41
8	Daimiel	38	16	8	14	50	54	−4	40
9	Alcobendas	38	15	9	14	55	58	−3	39
10	Carabanchel	38	14	10	14	48	49	−1	38
11	Ciempozuelos	38	15	8	15	64	62	+2	38
12	Conquense	38	14	10	14	44	40	+4	38
13	Pegaso	38	14	9	15	54	49	+5	37
14	Talavera	38	14	8	16	53	55	−2	36
15	Atlético de Pinto	38	13	9	16	40	55	−15	35
16	Guadalajara	38	13	9	16	52	64	−12	35
17	San Fernando de Henares	38	12	8	18	51	61	−10	32
18	Arganda	38	10	10	18	49	55	−6	30
19	Atlético Valdemoro	38	4	12	22	43	87	−44	20
20	Toledo	38	2	6	30	21	90	−69	10

=== Group VIII ===
Pos	Team	Pld	W	D	L	GF	GA	GD	Pts
1	Real Valladolid Promesas	38	28	4	6	97	36	+61	60
2	Ponferradina	38	27	3	8	86	29	+57	57
3	Béjar Industrial	38	22	7	9	92	48	+44	51
4	Atlético Bembibre	38	18	13	7	66	37	+29	49
5	Guardo	38	21	7	10	59	39	+20	49
6	Salmantino	38	20	7	11	62	40	+22	47
7	Atlético Astorga	38	17	8	13	44	44	0	42
8	Venta de Baños	38	14	12	12	44	42	+2	40
9	Cacabelense	38	17	5	16	66	61	+5	39
10	Gimnástica Medinense	38	10	15	13	49	50	−1	35
11	Benavente	38	15	5	18	56	72	−16	35
12	Salas	38	14	6	18	48	54	−6	34
13	Cultural Leonesa Promesas	38	10	12	16	47	62	−15	32
14	Ciudad Rodrigo	38	14	4	20	60	75	−15	32
15	Fabero	38	10	12	16	39	56	−17	32
16	Toreno	38	11	6	21	39	69	−30	28
17	La Bañeza	38	8	12	18	38	60	−22	28
18	Universitario	38	10	7	21	38	72	−34	27
19	Cristo Olímpico	38	10	4	24	45	89	−44	24
20	Burgos Promesas	38	5	9	24	35	75	−40	19

=== Group IX ===
Pos	Team	Pld	W	D	L	GF	GA	GD	Pts
1	Antequerano	38	23	9	6	70	32	+38	55
2	Martos	38	22	7	9	69	31	+38	51
3	Melilla	38	20	8	10	65	45	+20	48
4	Estepona	38	18	8	12	58	48	+10	44
5	Juventud de Torremolinos	38	17	10	11	57	48	+9	44
6	Úbeda	38	18	6	14	61	39	+22	42
7	San Pedro	38	17	8	13	45	35	+10	42
8	Baza	38	17	6	15	39	43	−4	40
9	Recreativo de Bailén	38	13	14	11	56	48	+8	40
10	Ronda	38	15	9	14	62	57	+5	39
11	Iliturgi	38	13	12	13	48	45	+3	38
12	Motril	38	12	12	14	44	49	−5	36
13	Vélez	38	12	12	14	50	50	0	36
14	Carolinense	38	14	8	16	52	57	−5	36
15	Atlético Malagueño	38	11	13	14	43	43	0	35
16	Atlético Marbella	38	14	7	17	53	51	+2	35
17	Atarfe Industrial	38	14	5	19	47	61	−14	33
18	Recreativo de Granada	38	10	6	22	49	67	−18	26
19	Industrial de Melilla	38	8	6	24	28	81	−53	22
20	Loja	38	7	4	27	33	99	−66	18

=== Group X ===
Pos	Team	Pld	W	D	L	GF	GA	GD	Pts
1	Sevilla Atlético	38	22	11	5	88	37	+51	55
2	Don Benito	38	20	11	7	48	23	+25	51
3	Atlético Sanluqueño	38	20	9	9	49	28	+21	49
4	Cacereño	38	17	14	7	41	27	+14	48
5	Coria	38	18	11	9	56	36	+20	47
6	Pozoblanco	38	19	7	12	50	36	+14	45
7	Betis Deportivo	38	15	15	8	60	38	+22	45
8	Puerto Real	38	16	11	11	59	33	+26	43
9	Moralo	38	15	9	14	52	57	−5	39
10	Rota	38	14	10	14	51	46	+5	38
11	Extremadura	38	13	11	14	46	57	−11	37
12	Jerez Industrial	38	11	15	12	40	41	−1	37
13	Balompédica Linense	38	12	12	14	46	58	−12	36
14	Plasencia	38	13	8	17	52	66	−14	34
15	Villanovense	38	13	6	19	45	55	−10	32
16	Ayamonte	38	10	12	16	42	44	−2	32
17	Montijo	38	8	12	18	36	59	−23	28
18	Llerenense	38	8	10	20	39	69	−30	26
19	África Ceutí	38	7	9	22	33	64	−31	23
20	O'Donnell	38	5	5	28	25	84	−59	15

=== Group XI ===
Pos	Team	Pld	W	D	L	GF	GA	GD	Pts
1	Poblense	38	28	8	2	92	16	+76	64
2	Constància	38	23	9	6	89	37	+52	55
3	Atlètic de Ciutadella	38	15	13	10	68	59	+9	43
4	Sporting Mahonés	38	17	8	13	54	43	+11	42
5	Murense	38	17	8	13	60	46	+14	42
6	Margaritense	38	17	6	15	57	45	+12	40
7	Andratx	38	17	6	15	43	57	−14	40
8	Portmany	38	15	9	14	59	42	+17	39
9	Manacor	38	15	9	14	46	38	+8	39
10	Porreres	38	12	14	12	56	52	+4	38
11	Sóller	38	14	8	16	44	63	−19	36
12	Collerense	38	15	6	17	52	60	−8	36
13	Binissalem	38	13	9	16	52	71	−19	35
14	Felanitx	38	13	8	17	31	39	−8	34
15	Ses Salines	38	12	9	17	51	62	−11	33
16	Alaior	38	12	8	18	33	60	−27	32
17	Calvià	38	12	8	18	48	65	−17	32
18	España	38	12	8	18	42	50	−8	32
19	Atlético Baleares	38	9	12	17	44	63	−19	30
20	Seislán	38	7	4	27	24	77	−53	18

=== Group XII ===
Pos	Team	Pld	W	D	L	GF	GA	GD	Pts
1	Realejos	38	21	10	7	63	33	+30	52
2	Telde	38	18	14	6	66	37	+29	50
3	Toscal	38	21	6	11	54	34	+20	48
4	San Andrés	38	19	10	9	51	40	+11	48
5	Lanzarote	38	20	8	10	51	26	+25	48
6	Sporting San José	38	18	10	10	54	42	+12	46
7	Tenisca	38	14	9	15	68	62	+6	37
8	Puerto de la Cruz	38	12	13	13	56	51	+5	37
9	Tenerife Aficionado	38	16	5	17	46	49	−3	37
10	Güímar	38	15	7	16	46	44	+2	37
11	Marino	38	14	9	15	56	56	0	37
12	Estrella	38	12	12	14	57	57	0	36
13	Real Artesano	38	12	12	14	51	57	−6	36
14	Unión Moral	38	13	9	16	41	48	−7	35
15	Orotava	38	11	11	16	42	49	−7	33
16	Real Unión de Tenerife	38	13	6	19	56	71	−15	32
17	Racing	38	11	8	19	46	78	−32	30
18	Santa Brígida	38	11	8	19	49	58	−9	30
19	Unión Chile	38	9	9	20	45	76	−31	27
20	San Antonio	38	7	10	21	35	65	−30	24

=== Group XIII ===
Pos	Team	Pld	W	D	L	GF	GA	GD	Pts
1	Lorca Deportiva	38	23	11	4	64	27	+37	57
2	Albacete	38	25	6	7	79	29	+50	56
3	Yeclano	38	19	7	12	64	21	+43	45
4	Imperial	38	16	12	10	52	45	+7	44
5	Torrevieja	38	17	9	12	67	47	+20	43
6	Caravaca	38	17	8	13	62	44	+18	42
7	Olímpico Juvenil	38	16	10	12	69	62	+7	42
8	Callosa	38	13	14	11	43	48	−5	40
9	Orihuela	38	14	11	13	66	61	+5	39
10	Pinatar	38	12	14	12	44	40	+4	38
11	Villarrobledo	38	16	6	16	54	56	−2	38
12	Ilicitano	38	12	11	15	46	56	−10	35
13	Cieza	38	13	9	16	56	58	−2	35
14	Águilas	38	11	12	15	53	60	−7	34
15	Molinense	38	13	8	17	42	52	−10	34
16	Almoradí	38	12	9	17	46	55	−9	33
17	Horadada	38	13	7	18	53	68	−15	33
18	Hellín	38	9	11	18	41	66	−25	29
19	Santomera	38	5	16	17	37	55	−18	26
20	Almansa	38	6	5	27	29	87	−58	17

== Promotion playoff ==
=== First round ===
Team 1	Agg.	Team 2	1st leg	2nd leg
Arosa	4–3	Realejos	3–0	1–3
Ponferradina	3–2	Lugo	2–1	1–1
Binéfar	(a) 2–2	Albacete	1–0	1–2
Arenas de Getxo	1–3	Poblense	1–1	0–2
Constància	1–3	Lorca Deportiva	0–1	1–2
Telde	(p) 2–2	Sevilla Atlético	2–0	0–2
Figueres	0–3	Sporting de Gijón Atlético	0–2	0–1
Martos	1–4	Erandio	1–2	0–2
Catarroja	2–3	Don Benito	2–0	0–3
Colonia Moscardó	0–1	Antequerano	0–1	0–0
Real Aranjuez	0–3	Reus	0–2	0–1
Endesa Andorra	3–1	Real Valladolid Promesas	1–0	2–1

=== Final Round ===
Team 1	Agg.	Team 2	1st leg	2nd leg
Poblense	1–3	Endesa Andorra	1–1	0–2
Telde	3–4	Antequerano	1–0	2–4
Sporting de Gijón Atlético	2–1	Don Benito	0–1	2–0
Arosa	1–3	Reus	1–0	0–3
Lorca Deportiva	3–1	Binéfar	2–1	1–0
Erandio	3–0	Ponferradina	1–0	2–0

== Season records ==
- Most wins: 28, Real Valladolid Promesas and Poblense.
- Most draws: 16, Lagun Onak, Bergara and Santomera.
- Most losses: 30, Toledo.
- Most goals for: 97, Real Valladolid Promesas.
- Most goals against: 99, Loja.
- Most points: 64, Real Valladolid Promesas.
- Fewest wins: 2, Toledo.
- Fewest draws: 3, Ponferradina.
- Fewest losses: 2, Poblense.
- Fewest goals for: 21, Toledo.
- Fewest goals against: 16, Poblense.
- Fewest points: 10, Toledo.
