= 1982–83 Tercera División =

Tercera División
- Season: 1982–83

The 1982–83 Tercera División season is the 6th season since establishment the tier four.

== League tables ==
=== Group I ===
Pos	Team	Pld	W	D	L	GF	GA	GD	Pts
1	Pontevedra	38	28	4	6	64	18	+46	60
2	Arosa	38	25	8	5	58	20	+38	58
3	Ourense	38	25	7	6	63	25	+38	57
4	Lugo	38	20	11	7	64	27	+37	51
5	Gran Peña	38	18	12	8	65	42	+23	48
6	Lemos	38	16	9	13	30	34	−4	41
7	Fabril Deportivo	38	15	9	14	55	53	+2	39
8	Alondras	38	14	10	14	52	48	+4	38
9	Lalín	38	12	14	12	35	31	+4	38
10	Barco	38	12	12	14	38	47	−9	36
11	Vista Alegre	38	13	9	16	46	51	−5	35
12	Turista	38	13	8	17	34	45	−11	34
13	Viveiro	38	11	9	18	40	46	−6	31
14	Eume	38	10	11	17	43	58	−15	31
15	Arenteiro	38	12	6	20	33	53	−20	30
16	San Martín	38	9	12	17	34	44	−10	30
17	Flavia	38	10	8	20	27	47	−20	28
18	Atlético Riveira	38	10	8	20	31	53	−22	28
19	Gondomar	38	9	10	19	63	77	−14	28
20	Porriño Industrial	38	5	9	24	31	87	−56	19

=== Group II ===
Pos	Team	Pld	W	D	L	GF	GA	GD	Pts
1	Ensidesa	38	25	11	2	74	22	+52	61
2	Langreo	38	21	11	6	81	40	+41	53
3	Real Oviedo Aficionado	38	19	11	8	55	40	+15	49
4	Rayo Cantabria	38	18	10	10	74	41	+33	46
5	Gimnástica de Torrelavega	38	18	9	11	56	34	+22	45
6	Castro	38	17	7	14	52	40	+12	41
7	Turón	38	16	9	13	50	45	+5	41
8	Caudal	38	14	12	12	46	37	+9	40
9	Cayón	38	14	11	13	53	54	−1	39
10	Unión Club	38	14	10	14	46	58	−12	38
11	Siero	38	14	9	15	53	53	0	37
12	San Martín	38	15	6	17	63	67	−4	36
13	Real Avilés	38	11	13	14	35	39	−4	35
14	Santoña	38	13	6	19	33	51	−18	32
15	Barquereño	38	12	7	19	36	55	−19	31
16	Titánico	38	11	8	19	35	50	−15	30
17	Naval	38	11	8	19	40	63	−23	30
18	Deportiva Piloñesa	38	10	9	19	45	65	−20	29
19	Europa de Nava	38	9	8	21	32	64	−32	26
20	Asturias de Blimea	38	7	7	24	33	74	−41	21

=== Group III ===
Pos	Team	Pld	W	D	L	GF	GA	GD	Pts
1	Durango	38	22	11	5	72	29	+43	55
2	Eibar	38	24	5	9	58	31	+27	53
3	Amorebieta	38	21	9	8	52	33	+19	51
4	Baskonia	38	18	11	9	49	35	+14	47
5	Aurrerá de Ondarroa	38	16	11	11	47	32	+15	43
6	Anaitasuna	38	16	8	14	47	46	+1	40
7	Getxo	38	15	9	14	41	40	+1	39
8	Real Unión	38	16	7	15	51	47	+4	39
9	Touring	38	13	12	13	38	45	−7	38
10	Santutxu	38	13	11	14	42	51	−9	37
11	Santurtzi	38	15	6	17	70	66	+4	36
12	Deusto	38	11	14	13	44	57	−13	36
13	Lemona	38	11	13	14	49	56	−7	35
14	Tolosa	38	9	15	14	40	48	−8	33
15	Ilintxa	38	11	11	16	39	49	−10	33
16	Bergara	38	10	12	16	30	49	−19	32
17	Gernika	38	12	7	19	38	48	−10	31
18	Lagun Onak	38	9	13	16	35	50	−15	31
19	Zorrotza	38	12	7	19	52	62	−10	31
20	Alavés Aficionados	38	4	12	22	34	54	−20	20

=== Group IV ===
Pos	Team	Pld	W	D	L	GF	GA	GD	Pts
1	Deportivo Aragón	38	26	9	3	86	22	+64	61
2	Sabiñánigo	38	25	7	6	73	36	+37	57
3	Atlético Monzón	38	18	10	10	64	41	+23	46
4	Tudelano	38	16	14	8	52	41	+11	46
5	Peña Sport	38	17	8	13	45	46	−1	42
6	Jacetano	38	14	13	11	44	40	+4	41
7	Numancia	38	16	6	16	47	46	+1	38
8	Arnedo	38	11	15	12	41	34	+7	37
9	Alsasua	38	14	9	15	42	52	−10	37
10	Alfaro	38	13	10	15	41	46	−5	36
11	Utrillas	38	11	13	14	39	43	−4	35
12	Haro	38	11	13	14	38	46	−8	35
13	Tarazona	38	14	7	17	52	58	−6	35
14	Mirandés	38	11	12	15	37	44	−7	34
15	Calahorra	38	13	8	17	49	46	+3	34
16	Sangüesa	38	9	16	13	31	41	−10	34
17	Corellano	38	10	12	16	47	49	−2	32
18	Burladés	38	8	11	19	21	53	−32	27
19	Oberena	38	7	13	18	26	56	−30	27
20	Tauste	38	8	10	20	35	60	−25	26

=== Group V ===
Pos	Team	Pld	W	D	L	GF	GA	GD	Pts
1	Olot	38	22	10	6	86	39	+47	54
2	Figueres	38	22	10	6	78	48	+30	54
3	Badalona	38	18	13	7	59	43	+16	49
4	Sant Andreu	38	20	6	12	68	49	+19	46
5	Lloret	38	18	9	11	66	45	+21	45
6	Banyoles	38	19	6	13	76	64	+12	44
7	Horta	38	16	10	12	49	47	+2	42
8	Terrassa	38	16	10	12	49	37	+12	42
9	FC Barcelona Aficionados	38	14	13	11	62	55	+7	41
10	Santboià	38	14	10	14	57	59	−2	38
11	Europa	38	14	9	15	59	59	0	37
12	Manresa	38	14	7	17	66	70	−4	35
13	Vic	38	14	7	17	59	65	−6	35
14	Vilafranca	38	11	13	14	51	60	−9	35
15	Júpiter	38	14	6	18	55	57	−2	34
16	Igualada	38	12	9	17	50	63	−13	33
17	Tortosa	38	10	11	17	37	58	−21	31
18	Canovelles	38	10	8	20	56	69	−13	28
19	La Cava	38	8	5	25	25	71	−46	21
20	Mataró	38	5	6	27	42	92	−50	16

=== Group VI ===
Pos	Team	Pld	W	D	L	GF	GA	GD	Pts
1	Mestalla	38	21	11	6	66	33	+33	53
2	Levante	38	21	11	6	59	20	+39	53
3	Burriana	38	21	7	10	54	29	+25	49
4	Gandía	38	19	10	9	50	21	+29	48
5	Vall de Uxó	38	19	7	12	50	34	+16	45
6	Benidorm	38	14	15	9	40	26	+14	43
7	Aspense	38	14	15	9	47	34	+13	43
8	Catarroja	38	13	14	11	46	34	+12	40
9	Ontinyent	38	13	13	12	51	42	+9	39
10	Alicante	38	13	12	13	42	44	−2	38
11	Torrente	38	14	10	14	31	46	−15	38
12	Vinaròs	38	15	7	16	41	40	+1	37
13	Novelda	38	14	9	15	39	43	−4	37
14	Villarreal	38	12	9	17	41	48	−7	33
15	Benicarló	38	12	6	20	35	61	−26	30
16	Paterna	38	9	12	17	33	70	−37	30
17	Carcaixent	38	10	8	20	44	55	−11	28
18	Dénia	38	7	12	19	38	55	−17	26
19	Alginet	38	8	9	21	27	70	−43	25
20	Puçol	38	9	7	22	44	73	−29	25

=== Group VII ===
Pos	Team	Pld	W	D	L	GF	GA	GD	Pts
1	Real Aranjuez	38	24	9	5	68	31	+37	57
2	Manchego	38	19	14	5	65	30	+35	52
3	Tarancón	38	22	6	10	61	41	+20	50
4	Pegaso	38	17	12	9	66	40	+26	46
5	Getafe	38	18	6	14	63	58	+5	42
6	Real Ávila	38	17	7	14	50	39	+11	41
7	Real Madrid Aficionados	38	16	9	13	64	51	+13	41
8	Daimiel	38	15	10	13	48	54	−6	40
9	Carabanchel	38	13	12	13	45	41	+4	38
10	Conquense	38	13	9	16	41	58	−17	35
11	San Fernando de Henares	38	13	9	16	46	50	−4	35
12	Alcorcón	38	12	11	15	43	50	−7	35
13	Valdepeñas	38	14	6	18	44	50	−6	34
14	Ciempozuelos	38	11	11	16	50	60	−10	33
15	Atlético Madrileño	38	13	7	18	55	59	−4	33
16	Leganés	38	10	13	15	45	50	−5	33
17	Gimnástica Segoviana	38	13	6	19	47	65	−18	32
18	Colonia Moscardó	38	11	9	18	46	56	−10	31
19	Alcobendas	38	10	9	19	45	66	−21	29
20	Atlético de Pinto	38	6	11	21	31	74	−43	23

=== Group VIII ===
Pos	Team	Pld	W	D	L	GF	GA	GD	Pts
1	Real Valladolid Promesas	38	22	13	3	86	26	+60	57
2	Zamora	38	23	10	5	70	16	+54	56
3	Arandina	38	23	8	7	59	34	+25	54
4	Ponferradina	38	23	8	7	86	30	+56	54
5	Atlético Astorga	38	22	8	8	75	38	+37	52
6	Gimnástica Medinense	38	17	11	10	49	43	+6	45
7	Cristo Olímpico	38	15	11	12	48	41	+7	41
8	Atlético Bembibre	38	17	7	14	81	54	+27	41
9	La Bañeza	38	14	11	13	49	47	+2	39
10	Salmantino	38	13	12	13	44	31	+13	38
11	Venta de Baños	38	14	9	15	48	55	−7	37
12	Toresana	38	12	11	15	42	67	−25	35
13	Coyanza	38	12	9	17	47	64	−17	33
14	Guardo	38	13	6	19	47	63	−16	32
15	Salas	38	13	6	19	36	66	−30	32
16	Toreno	38	8	13	17	34	56	−22	29
17	Cacabelense	38	9	7	22	43	62	−19	25
18	Benavente	38	6	12	20	36	78	−42	24
19	Laguna	38	7	7	24	39	85	−46	21
20	Fabero	38	5	5	28	37	100	−63	15

=== Group IX ===
Pos	Team	Pld	W	D	L	GF	GA	GD	Pts
1	Balompédica Linense	38	23	10	5	84	31	+53	56
2	Atlético Marbella	38	21	8	9	75	29	+46	50
3	Villanueva	38	19	10	9	55	41	+14	48
4	Melilla	38	18	11	9	45	36	+9	47
5	Atlético Benamiel	38	18	8	12	57	48	+9	44
6	Atlético Macael	38	17	10	11	65	48	+17	44
7	Martos	38	17	8	13	67	58	+9	42
8	Juventud de Torremolinos	38	14	14	10	60	55	+5	42
9	Recreativo de Bailén	38	15	12	11	64	53	+11	42
10	Estepona	38	17	7	14	51	51	0	41
11	Alhaurino	38	17	7	14	68	59	+9	41
12	Atlético Malagueño	38	14	11	13	45	37	+8	39
13	Baza	38	15	8	15	53	56	−3	38
14	Industrial de Melilla	38	13	12	13	42	46	−4	38
15	San Pedro	38	14	8	16	48	55	−7	36
16	Motril	38	13	9	16	45	44	+1	35
17	Úbeda	38	11	12	15	44	49	−5	34
18	Carolinense	38	6	7	25	35	75	−40	19
19	El Palo	38	4	7	27	21	73	−52	15
20	Vélez	38	1	7	30	24	104	−80	9

=== Group X ===
Pos	Team	Pld	W	D	L	GF	GA	GD	Pts
1	Sevilla Atlético	38	26	9	3	82	28	+54	61
2	Coria	38	23	2	13	66	42	+24	48
3	Cacereño	38	18	9	11	55	42	+13	45
4	Pozoblanco	38	17	10	11	61	36	+25	44
5	Brenes	38	17	10	11	50	43	+7	44
6	Mérida Industrial	38	17	9	12	41	28	+13	43
7	Díter Zafra	38	14	11	13	42	46	−4	39
8	Puerto Real	38	13	13	12	37	37	0	39
9	Jerez Industrial	38	14	11	13	45	47	−2	39
10	Plasencia	38	14	11	13	49	49	0	39
11	Rota	38	11	16	11	42	51	−9	38
12	Alcalá	38	13	12	13	36	42	−6	38
13	Extremadura	38	12	13	13	45	43	+2	37
14	Betis Deportivo	38	13	11	14	49	47	+2	37
15	Don Benito	38	14	8	16	45	47	−2	36
16	Iliturgi	38	12	9	17	46	55	−9	33
17	Riotinto	38	9	13	16	41	55	−14	31
18	Moralo	38	7	10	21	30	60	−30	24
19	Atlético Sanluqueño	38	6	11	21	34	64	−30	23
20	Montijo	38	6	10	22	32	66	−34	22

=== Group XI ===
Pos	Team	Pld	W	D	L	GF	GA	GD	Pts
1	Constància	38	33	3	2	87	18	+69	69
2	Manacor	38	21	12	5	75	32	+43	54
3	Portmany	38	19	13	6	76	30	+46	51
4	Porreres	38	20	7	11	59	52	+7	47
5	Badía-Cala Millor	38	15	14	9	46	30	+16	44
6	Murense	38	19	6	13	64	51	+13	44
7	Margaritense	38	17	10	11	53	40	+13	44
8	Sporting Mahonés	38	14	11	13	49	40	+9	39
9	Artà	38	15	8	15	55	55	0	38
10	Felanitx	38	13	8	17	47	58	−11	34
11	Calvià	38	11	11	16	54	69	−15	33
12	Binissalem	38	12	9	17	44	59	−15	33
13	Alaior	38	13	6	19	34	49	−15	32
14	Collerense	38	9	13	16	44	60	−16	31
15	Ses Salines	38	12	7	19	37	61	−24	31
16	Porto Cristo	38	12	6	20	42	55	−13	30
17	Xilvar	38	9	11	18	43	72	−29	29
18	España	38	9	11	18	36	66	−30	29
19	Atlètic de Ciutadella	38	9	9	20	42	55	−13	27
20	Andratx	38	7	7	24	32	67	−35	21

=== Group XII ===
Pos	Team	Pld	W	D	L	GF	GA	GD	Pts
1	Las Palmas Atlético	38	26	5	7	111	31	+80	57
2	Puerto de la Cruz	38	19	11	8	65	50	+15	49
3	San Andrés	38	20	7	11	68	43	+25	47
4	Güímar	38	18	11	9	61	43	+18	47
5	Telde	38	17	10	11	76	41	+35	44
6	Tenisca	38	18	7	13	66	55	+11	43
7	Orotava	38	17	6	15	75	61	+14	40
8	Las Torres	38	12	15	11	53	56	−3	39
9	Lanzarote	38	15	8	15	45	48	−3	38
10	Real Artesano	38	14	9	15	60	72	−12	37
11	Unión Tejina	38	14	9	15	51	62	−11	37
12	San Antonio	38	12	11	15	53	51	+2	35
13	Realejos	38	13	8	17	58	67	−9	34
14	Marino	38	11	11	16	42	54	−12	33
15	Tamaraceite	38	12	9	17	55	74	−19	33
16	Estrella	38	11	10	17	47	51	−4	32
17	Salud	38	13	6	19	47	80	−33	32
18	Real Unión de Tenerife	38	12	8	18	49	77	−28	32
19	Tenerife Aficionado	38	10	9	19	51	61	−10	29
20	Sporting San José	38	7	8	23	38	94	−56	22

=== Group XIII ===
Pos	Team	Pld	W	D	L	GF	GA	GD	Pts
1	Eldense	38	20	12	6	64	31	+33	52
2	Orihuela	38	22	6	10	69	37	+32	50
3	Imperial	38	18	10	10	55	37	+18	46
4	Torrevieja	38	13	16	9	46	32	+14	42
5	Villarrobledo	38	15	12	11	65	51	+14	42
6	Almansa	38	19	3	16	63	57	+6	41
7	Atlético Muleño	38	14	11	13	34	42	−8	39
8	Torre Pacheco	38	14	11	13	49	48	+1	39
9	Águilas	38	11	15	12	36	43	−7	37
10	Jumilla	38	15	7	16	43	47	−4	37
11	Cieza	38	13	11	14	51	45	+6	37
12	Yeclano	38	13	10	15	59	62	−3	36
13	Ilicitano	38	13	10	15	48	58	−10	36
14	Molinense	38	10	15	13	38	42	−4	35
15	Huercalense	38	12	11	15	38	47	−9	35
16	Olímpico Juvenil	38	10	13	15	47	65	−18	33
17	Caravaca	38	9	14	15	32	39	−7	32
18	Horadada	38	11	10	17	42	57	−15	32
19	Mazarrón	38	10	11	17	41	63	−22	31
20	Pinatar	38	10	8	20	39	56	−17	28

== Promotion playoff ==
=== First round ===
Team 1	Agg.	Team 2	1st leg	2nd leg
Sevilla Atlético	6–3	Manchego	1–2	5–1
Mestalla	2–3	Arosa	2–1	0–2
Zamora	(p) 3–3	Las Palmas Atlético	0–0	3–3
Pontevedra	2–2 (p)	Eibar	2–0	0–2
Durango	1–4	Figueres	0–1	1–3
Real Valladolid Promesas	1–7	Deportivo Aragón	1–0	0–7
Sabiñánigo	1–2	Balompédica Linense	1–0	0–2
Manacor	1–2	Eldense	0–0	1–2
Ensidesa	2–1	Levante	2–0	0–1
Constància	4–2	Orihuela	2–0	2–2
Olot	5–4	Langreo	4–0	1–4
Atlético Marbella	0–1	Real Aranjuez	0–1	0–0

=== Final Round ===
Team 1	Agg.	Team 2	1st leg	2nd leg
Figueres	4–2	Sevilla Atlético	3–1	1–1
Balompédica Linense	3–2	Eibar	3–1	0–1
Arosa	2–1	Olot	2–0	0–1
Constància	1–2	Zamora	1–0	0–2
Deportivo Aragón	2–0	Eldense	1–0	1–0
Ensidesa	4–3	Real Aranjuez	3–1	1–2

== Season records ==
- Most wins: 33, Constancia.
- Most draws: 16, Sangüesa, Rota and Torrevieja.
- Most losses: 30, Vélez.
- Most goals for: 111, Las Palmas Atlético.
- Most goals against: 104, Vélez.
- Most points: 69, Constancia.
- Fewest wins: 1, Vélez.
- Fewest draws: 2, Industrial de Melilla and Coria.
- Fewest losses: 2, Ensidesa and Constancia.
- Fewest goals for: 21, Burladés and El Palo.
- Fewest goals against: 16, Zamora.
- Fewest points: 9, Vélez.
