= Divisiones Regionales de Fútbol in Canary Islands =

The Divisiones Regionales de Fútbol in the Canary Islands are ultimately overseen by the Federación Canaria de Fútbol which operates Group 12 of the Tercera Federación, the fifth tier of the Spanish football league system, divided among each of the country's autonomous regions. However, unlike most of the regions, the leagues in the sixth tier and below are organised by two separate federations, corresponding to the provinces of Las Palmas and Tenerife. The other region with this arrangement is the Basque Country which has three provincial forks to its amateur setup; Andalusia and the Balearic Islands have two and three parallel divisions respectively under the same umbrella.

== League setup summary ==
- Interinsular Preferente de Las Palmas (Level 6 of the Spanish football pyramid)
- Interinsular Preferente de Tenerife (Level 6)
- Primera Insular La Palma (Level 7)
- Primera Regional Aficionado Gran Canaria (Level 7)
- Primera Regional Aficionado Fuerteventura (Level 7)
- Primera Regional Aficionado Lanzarote (Level 7)
- Primera Interinsular Tenerife (Level 7)
- Segunda Regional Aficionado Gran Canaria (Level 8)
- Segunda Interinsular Tenerife (Level 8)

== League chronology ==
Timeline - Las Palmas

Timeline - Tenerife

== Regional football in Las Palmas ==
Preferente de las Islas Canarias is the sixth level of competition of the Spanish Football League in that community.

The league consists of two provincial groups (Tenerife and Gran Canaria) of 18 teams. At the end of the season, the champion of each group is promoted directly to the Canarian Islands group of the Tercera Federación and the runners-up play a playoff for promotion. The last four teams in the Gran Canaria group and last three in the Tenerife group are relegated to Primera Categoría.

=== Interinsular Preferente de Las Palmas ===
Interinsular Preferente
- Founded: 1975
- Country: Spain
- Number of clubs: Variable (1 group)
- Level on pyramid: 6
- Promotion to: 3ª Federación – Group 12
- Relegation to: Primera Aficionados Gran Canaria; Liga Insular de Aficionados Fuerteventura; Primera Insular Aficionado Lanzarote; Primera Insular La Palma
- Website: Federación Interinsular de Fútbol de Las Palmas

==== 2012–13 teams ====
	Team	Founded in	Based in	2012–13 season
1	El Cotillo	2007	El Cotillo, Fuerteventura	1st
2	Unión Sur Yaiza	1983	Yaiza, Lanzarote	2nd
3	Arguineguín	1968	Arguineguín, Gran Canaria	3rd
4	San Antonio	1953	Las Palmas de Gran Canaria	4th
5	Real Sporting San José	1913	Las Palmas de Gran Canaria	5th
6	Ferreras	1920	Las Palmas de Gran Canaria	6th
7	Unión Puerto del Rosario	2005	Puerto del Rosario, Fuerteventura	7th
8	Acodetti	1988	Las Palmas de Gran Canaria	8th
9	Teror Balompié	1956	Teror, Gran Canaria	9th
10	Guía	1926	Santa María de Guía, Gran Canaria	10th
11	Polígono de Arinaga	2003	Arinaga, Gran Canaria	11th
12	Balos	1974	Balos, Gran Canaria	12th
13	Arucas	1927	Arucas, Gran Canaria	13th
14	Los Vélez	2007	Montaña Los Vélez, Gran Canaria	14th
15	San Bartolomé	1972	San Bartolomé, Lanzarote	15th
16	Vallinámar	2000	Valle de Jinámar, Gran Canaria	16th
17	Huracán	1980	Las Palmas de Gran Canaria	17th
18	Atlético Tiense	2004	Tías, Lanzarote	18th

=== 7th tier: Primera de Aficionados de Gran Canaria ===
Primera de Aficionados de Gran Canaria is the seventh level of competition in Gran Canaria. The league is played with 36 teams in two groups of 18. At the end of the season, the champions are promoted and the runners-up and 3rd placed teams advance to promotion playoff for two additional promotions. Four clubs from each group are relegated to Segunda Categoría Insular.

=== Some teams playing at this level ===
- Castillo

=== 8th tier: Segunda Regional de Gran Canaria ===
Segunda Regional de Gran Canaria is the eighth level of competition in Gran Canaria. The league is played with 43 teams in 3 groups of 13-16. At the end of the season, the champions, runners-up, the 3rd placed team from group 1 and the best 3rd placed team between the other two groups are promoted.

=== 7th tier: Liga Insular de Aficionados Fuerteventura ===
Liga Insular de Aficionados Fuerteventura is the seventh level of competition in Fuerteventura. The league is played with 16 teams. At the end of the season, the champion advances to promotion playoff.

=== 7th tier: Primera Insular Aficionado Lanzarote ===
Primera Insular Aficionado Lanzarote is the seventh level of competition in Lanzarote. The league is played with 10 teams with the champion advancing to the promotion playoff at the end of the season.

=== 7th tier: Primera Insular La Palma ===
Primera Insular La Palma is the seventh level of competition in La Palma. The league is played with 10 teams with the top four clubs advancing to promotion league. The winner is promoted.

== Regional football in Tenerife ==
=== 6th tier: Interinsular Preferente de Tenerife ===
The Interinsular Preferente de Tenerife is the top tier of Tenerife football, with two leagues, the Primera Interinsular Tenerife and Segunda Interinsular Tenerife sitting below it. Clubs that achieve promotion from the Tenerife Preferente go to the Canarian Islands group of the Tercera Federación.

Interinsular Preferente
- Founded: 1975
- Country: Spain
- Number of clubs: Variable (1 group)
- Level on pyramid: 6
- Promotion to: 3ª Federación – Group 12
- Relegation to: Primera Interinsular Tenerife
- Website: Federación Tinerfeña de Fútbol

==== 2021-22 teams ====
===== Group 1 =====
	Team	Founded in	Based in	Stadium
1	Arguijón	1940	La Cuesta, San Cristóbal de La Laguna, Tenerife	Municipal Sebastián Hernández Brito
2	Atlético San Juan	-	Santa Cruz de Tenerife, Tenerife	Maria Jiménez
3	Atlético Tacoronte	2006	Tacoronte, Tenerife	Barranco Las Lajas
4	Candela	-	Candelaria, Tenerife	Campo de Fútbol de Candelaria
5	Laguna	1984	San Cristóbal de La Laguna, Tenerife	Municipal Francisco Peraza
6	Los Llanos	1996	Los Llanos de Aridane, La Palma	Aceró
7	Ofra	2015	La Cuesta, San Cristóbal de La Laguna, Tenerife	Municipal Sebastián Hernández Brito
8	Real Unión	1915	La Salud, Santa Cruz de Tenerife, Tenerife	Campo de Fútbol de La Salud
9	Sauzal	-	El Sauzal, Tenerife	Complejo Deportivo El Sauzal
10	San Andrés	1930	San Andrés, Santa Cruz de Tenerife, Tenerife	Valle Las Huertas
11	Tacoronte	2012	Tacoronte, Tenerife	Avencio Hernández
12	Unión Tejina	1955	Tejina, San Cristóbal de La Laguna, Tenerife	Izquierdo Rodríguez
13	Zamorano Esperanza	1955	La Esperanza, El Rosario, Tenerife	Maximino Bacallado

===== Group 2 =====
	Team	Founded in	Based in	Stadium
1	Atlético Victoria	1992	La Victoria de Acentejo, Tenerife	Municipal de La Victoria de Acentejo
2	Buenavista	2016	Buenavista del Norte, Tenerife	Municipal de Buenavista
3	Cruz Santa	1967	Cruz Santa, Los Realejos, Tenerife	La Suerte
4	Florida	2015	La Florida, La Orotava, Tenerife	Municipal de La Florida
5	Fuencaliente	1979	Fuencaliente de La Palma, La Palma	Campo de Fútbol de Fuencaliente
6	Guancha	2014	La Guancha, Tenerife	Campo de Fútbol Montefrío
7	Icodense	1912	Icod de los Vinos, Tenerife	Municipal El Molino
8	José Martín El Cano	2015	Tazacorte, La Palma	Campo de Fútbol de Tazacorte
9	Matanza	-	La Matanza de Acentejo, Tenerife	Campo de Fútbol de La Matanza de Acentejo
10	Orotava	1923	La Orotava, Tenerife	Municipal Los Cuartos
11	Puerto Cruz	1957	Puerto de la Cruz, Tenerife	El Peñón
12	Realejos	1949	Los Realejos, Tenerife	Los Príncipes

===== Group 3 =====
	Team	Founded in	Based in	Stadium
1	Águilas Atlético	1971	Adeje, Tenerife	Municipal de Adeje
2	Arcángel San Miguel	1948	San Miguel de Abona, Tenerife	Campo de Fútbol de San Miguel de Abona
3	Atlético Granadilla	1959	Granadilla de Abona, Tenerife	Francisco Suárez
4	Atlético Unión Güímar	2009	Güímar, Tenerife	Municipal de Tasagaya
5	Bahía de Santiago	2018	Playa de Santiago, Alajeró, La Gomera	Municipal de Playa de Santiago
6	Furia Arona	2009	Adeje, Tenerife	Municipal de Arona
7	Ibarra	1969	El Fraile, Arona, Tenerife	Municipal Villa Isabel
8	I'Gara Cabo Blanco	-	Cabo Blanco, Arona, Tenerife	Campo de Fútbol de Cabo Blanco
9	Marino B	1933	Los Cristianos, Arona, Tenerife	Anexo Antonio Domínguez
10	Parroquia Santos Reyes	2015	Valle Gran Rey, Tenerife	Hermigüa
11	San Lorenzo Constancia	-	San Lorenzo Valley, Arona, Tenerife	San Lorenzo Soccer Field
12	Tenerife C	2017	Santa Cruz de Tenerife, Tenerife	Geneto Sports City

=== 7th tier: Primera Interinsular de Tenerife ===
Primera Interinsular de Tenerife is the seventh level of competition in Tenerife. The league is played with 36 teams in two groups of 18. At the end of the season, the champions playoff for direct promotion. The loser enters the promotion playoff with the runners-up, 3rd and 4th placed teams for an addition promotion. Three clubs from each group are relegated to Segunda Categoría Insular.

=== 8th tier: Segunda Interinsular de Tenerife ===
Segunda Interinsular de Tenerife is the eighth level of competition in Tenerife. The league is played with 38 teams in one group of 20 and another group of 18. At the end of the season, the champions are promoted. Runners-up, 3rd, 4th and 5th placed teams enter promotion playoff for two additional promotions.
