= Arucas CF =

Association football club in Spain

Arucas
- Full name: Arucas Club de Fútbol
- Founded: 1927
- Ground: Tonono, Arucas, Gran Canaria, Canary Islands, Spain
- Capacity: 1,000
- President: Juanjo Arencibia
- Manager: Juan Germán Jiménez
- League: Interinsular Preferente
- 2025–26: Tercera Federación – Group 12, 15th of 18 (relegated)
Home colours	Away colours

Arucas Club de Fútbol, is a Spanish football team based in Arucas, Las Palmas, Gran Canaria in the Canary Islands. Founded in 1927, it plays in Interinsular Preferente, holding home games at Complejo Antonio Afonso Moreno, commonly known as Tonono, with a capacity of 1,000 people.

== Club history ==
=== Club names ===
- Argentino Fútbol Club (1927–1941)
- Argentino Club Deportivo (1941–1951)
- Arucas Club de Fútbol (1951– )

== Season to season ==
Season	Tier	Division	Place	Copa del Rey
1939–40	5	2ª Reg.	3rd	
1940–41	5	2ª Reg.	3rd	
1941–42	4	2ª Reg.	1st	
1942–43	4	2ª Reg.	1st	
1943–44	5	2ª Reg.	1st	
1944–45	5	2ª Reg.	5th	
1945–46	5	2ª Reg.	3rd	
1946–47	5	2ª Reg.	3rd	
1947–48	5	2ª Reg.	8th	
1948–49	5	2ª Reg.	6th	
1949–50	5	2ª Reg.	2nd	
1950–51	4	1ª Reg.	2nd	
1951–52	4	1ª Reg.	2nd	
1952–53	4	1ª Reg.	5th	
1953–54	4	1ª Reg.	3rd	
1954–55	4	1ª Reg.	6th	
1955–56	5	2ª Reg.	1st	
1956–57	4	1ª Reg.	6th	
1957–58	4	1ª Reg.	2nd	
1958–59	4	1ª Reg.	3rd	

Season	Tier	Division	Place	Copa del Rey
1959–60	4	1ª Reg.	1st	
1960–61	4	1ª Reg.	4th	
1961–62	4	1ª Reg.	7th	
1962–63	4	1ª Reg.	2nd	
1963–64	4	1ª Reg.	4th	
1964–65	4	1ª Reg.	6th	
1965–66	4	1ª Reg.	5th	
1966–67	4	1ª Reg.	6th	
1967–68	4	1ª Reg.	5th	
1968–69	4	1ª Reg.	6th	
1969–70	4	1ª Reg.	8th	
1970–71	5	2ª Reg.	1st	
1971–72	4	1ª Reg.	9th	
1972–73	5	2ª Reg.	2nd	
1973–74	4	1ª Reg.	7th	
1974–75	4	1ª Reg.	6th	
1975–76	4	1ª Reg.	5th	
1976–77	4	1ª Reg.	9th	
1977–78	5	Reg. Pref.	2nd	
1978–79	5	Reg. Pref.	7th	

Season	Tier	Division	Place	Copa del Rey
1979–80	5	Reg. Pref.	12th	
1980–81	5	Reg. Pref.	7th	
1981–82	5	Reg. Pref.	10th	
1982–83	5	Reg. Pref.	2nd	
1983–84	5	Reg. Pref.	2nd	
1984–85	5	Reg. Pref.	3rd	
1985–86	4	3ª	16th	
1986–87	4	3ª	10th	
1987–88	4	3ª	14th	
1988–89	4	3ª	18th	
1989–90	5	Int. Pref.	1st	
1990–91	4	3ª	19th	
1991–92	5	Int. Pref.	17th	
1992–93	6	1ª Reg.	7th	
1993–94	6	1ª Reg.	10th	
1994–95	6	1ª Reg.	8th	
1995–96	6	1ª Reg.	4th	
1996–97	6	1ª Reg.	1st	
1997–98	5	Int. Pref.	13th	
1998–99	5	Int. Pref.	18th	

Season	Tier	Division	Place	Copa del Rey
1999–2000	6	1ª Reg.	3rd	
2000–01	6	1ª Reg.	5th	
2001–02	6	1ª Reg.	1st	
2002–03	5	Int. Pref.	5th	
2003–04	5	Int. Pref.	14th	
2004–05	5	Int. Pref.	4th	
2005–06	5	Int. Pref.	13th	
2006–07	5	Int. Pref.	18th	
2007–08	6	1ª Reg.	1st	
2008–09	5	Int. Pref.	9th	
2009–10	5	Int. Pref.	15th	
2010–11	6	1ª Reg.	7th	
2011–12	6	1ª Reg.	3rd	
2012–13	5	Int. Pref.	13th	
2013–14	5	Int. Pref.	1st	
2014–15	4	3ª	9th	
2015–16	4	3ª	14th	
2016–17	4	3ª	19th	
2017–18	5	Int. Pref.	3rd	
2018–19	5	Int. Pref.	5th	

Season	Tier	Division	Place	Copa del Rey
2019–20	5	Int. Pref.	2nd	
2020–21	4	3ª	10th / 3rd	
2021–22	5	3ª RFEF	4th	
2022–23	5	3ª Fed.	12th	
2023–24	5	3ª Fed.	6th	
2024–25	5	3ª Fed.	9th	
2025–26	5	3ª Fed.		

- 9 seasons in Tercera División
- 5 seasons in Tercera Federación/Tercera División RFEF
