= CD Arcángel San Miguel =

Spanish football team

San Miguel
- Full name: Club Deportivo Arcángel San Miguel
- Founded: 1948
- Ground: Paco Tejera, San Miguel de Abona, Canary Islands, Spain
- Capacity: 3,000
- Chairman: Ernesto Delgado
- Manager: Dani Sánchez
- League: Tercera Federación – Group 12
- 2025–26: Tercera Federación – Group 12, 11th of 18
- Website: https://www.cdsanmiguel.com/
| Home colours | Away colours |

Club Deportivo Arcángel San Miguel is a Spanish football team based in San Miguel de Abona, in the autonomous community of the Canary Islands. Founded in 1948, they play in Tercera Federación – Group 12, holding home games at Estadio Paco Tejera, with a capacity of 2,000 seats.

== Season to season ==
| Season | Tier | Division | Place | Copa del Rey |
|---|---|---|---|---|
| 1948–49 | 6 | 3ª Reg. | 2nd | |
| 1949–50 | DNP | | | |
| 1950–51 | DNP | | | |
| 1951–52 | DNP | | | |
| 1952–53 | 6 | 3ª Reg. | 2nd | |
| 1953–1968 | DNP | | | |
| 1968–69 | 6 | 3ª Reg. | 3rd | |
| 1969–70 | 6 | 3ª Reg. | | |
| 1970–71 | 5 | 2ª Reg. | 12th | |
| 1971–72 | 5 | 2ª Reg. | | |
| 1972–73 | 5 | 2ª Reg. | 11th | |
| 1973–74 | 5 | 2ª Reg. | | |
| 1974–75 | 5 | 2ª Reg. | | |
| 1975–76 | 5 | 2ª Reg. | | |
| 1976–77 | 5 | 2ª Reg. | 14th | |
| 1977–78 | 7 | 2ª Reg. | | |
| 1978–79 | 7 | 2ª Reg. | | |
| 1979–80 | 7 | 2ª Reg. | 2nd | |
| 1980–81 | 6 | 1ª Reg. | 3rd | |
| 1981–82 | 5 | Reg. Pref. | 10th | |

| Season | Tier | Division | Place | Copa del Rey |
|---|---|---|---|---|
| 1982–83 | 5 | Reg. Pref. | 10th | |
| 1983–84 | 5 | Terr. Pref. | 8th | |
| 1984–85 | 5 | Terr. Pref. | 15th | |
| 1985–86 | 6 | 1ª Reg. | 5th | |
| 1986–87 | 6 | 1ª Reg. | 4th | |
| 1987–88 | 6 | 1ª Reg. | 1st | |
| 1988–89 | 5 | Terr. Pref. | 4th | |
| 1989–90 | 5 | Terr. Pref. | 11th | |
| 1990–91 | 5 | Int. Pref. | 6th | |
| 1991–92 | 5 | Int. Pref. | 18th | |
| 1992–93 | 6 | 1ª Int. | 5th | |
| 1993–94 | 6 | 1ª Int. | 3rd | |
| 1994–95 | 6 | 1ª Int. | 1st | |
| 1995–96 | 5 | Int. Pref. | 5th | |
| 1996–97 | 5 | Int. Pref. | 6th | |
| 1997–98 | 5 | Int. Pref. | 14th | |
| 1998–99 | 5 | Int. Pref. | 7th | |
| 1999–2000 | 5 | Int. Pref. | 14th | |
| 2000–01 | 5 | Int. Pref. | 6th | |
| 2001–02 | 5 | Int. Pref. | 8th | |

| Season | Tier | Division | Place | Copa del Rey |
|---|---|---|---|---|
| 2002–03 | 5 | Int. Pref. | 1st | |
| 2003–04 | 4 | 3ª | 20th | |
| 2004–05 | 5 | Int. Pref. | 17th | |
| 2005–06 | 6 | 1ª Int. | 5th | |
| 2006–07 | 6 | 1ª Int. | 10th | |
| 2007–08 | 6 | 1ª Int. | 8th | |
| 2008–09 | 6 | 1ª Int. | 2nd | |
| 2009–10 | 5 | Int. Pref. | 13th | |
| 2010–11 | 5 | Int. Pref. | 18th | |
| 2011–12 | 6 | 1ª Int. | 18th | |
| 2012–13 | 6 | 1ª Int. | 16th | |
| 2013–14 | 7 | 2ª Int. | 1st | |
| 2014–15 | 6 | 1ª Int. | 11th | |
| 2015–16 | 6 | 1ª Int. | 10th | |
| 2016–17 | 6 | 1ª Int. | 7th | |
| 2017–18 | 6 | 1ª Int. | 8th | |
| 2018–19 | 6 | 1ª Int. | 2nd | |
| 2019–20 | 5 | Int. Pref. | 8th | |
| 2020–21 | 5 | Int. Pref. | 9th | |
| 2021–22 | 6 | Int. Pref. | 6th | |

| Season | Tier | Division | Place | Copa del Rey |
|---|---|---|---|---|
| 2022–23 | 6 | Int. Pref. | 5th | |
| 2023–24 | 6 | Int. Pref. | 1st | |
| 2024–25 | 5 | 3ª Fed. | 14th | |
| 2025–26 | 5 | 3ª Fed. | 11th | |
| 2026–27 | 5 | 3ª Fed. | | |

- 1 season in Tercera División
- 3 seasons in Tercera Federación
