= CD Atlético Paso =

Spanish football club

Atlético Paso
- Full name: Club Deportivo Atlético Paso
- Nickname: El club del volcán
- Founded: 17 June 1952; 74 years ago
- Ground: Municipal, El Paso, La Palma, Canary Islands, Spain
- Capacity: 5,000
- President: William Nazco
- Head coach: Maxi Barrera
- League: Segunda Federación – Group 4
- 2025–26: Tercera Federación – Group 12, 1st of 18 (champions)
Home colours	Away colours

Club Deportivo Atlético Paso is a Spanish football team based in El Paso, in the autonomous community of Canary Islands. Founded on 17 June 1952, it plays in Segunda Federación – Group 4, holding home matches at Campo Municipal de El Paso, with a capacity of 5,000 people.

== Season to season ==
Season	Tier	Division	Place	Copa del Rey
1952–53	5	2ª Reg.	5th	
1953–54	4	1ª Reg.	1st	
1954–55	4	1ª Reg.	2nd	
1955–56	4	1ª Reg.	8th	
1956–57	4	1ª Reg.	4th	
1957–58	4	1ª Reg.	8th	
1958–59	4	1ª Reg.	5th	
1959–60	4	1ª Reg.	4th	
1960–61	4	1ª Reg.	5th	
1961–62	4	1ª Reg.	5th	
1962–63	4	1ª Reg.	6th	
1963–64	DNP			
1964–65	DNP			
1965–66	5	2ª Reg.	3rd	
1966–67	5	2ª Reg.	7th	
1967–68	5	2ª Reg.	2nd	
1968–69	5	2ª Reg.	4th	
1969–70	5	2ª Reg.	4th	
1970–71	5	2ª Reg.	5th	
1971–72	5	2ª Reg.	7th	

Season	Tier	Division	Place	Copa del Rey
1972–73	5	2ª Reg.	4th	
1973–74	5	2ª Reg.	5th	
1974–75	5	2ª Reg.	5th	
1975–76	5	2ª Reg.	1st	
1976–77	5	2ª Reg.	2nd	
1977–78	7	2ª Reg.	4th	
1978–79	7	2ª Reg.	1st	
1979–80	6	1ª Reg.	9th	
1980–81	5	Reg. Pref.	12th	
1981–82	5	Reg. Pref.	11th	
1982–83	5	Reg. Pref.	12th	
1983–84	5	Reg. Pref.	12th	
1984–85	5	Reg. Pref.	14th	
1985–86	6	1ª Reg.	2nd	
1986–87	5	Reg. Pref.	8th	
1987–88	5	Reg. Pref.	1st	
1988–89	4	3ª	13th	
1989–90	4	3ª	17th	
1990–91	5	Int. Pref.	9th	
1991–92	5	Int. Pref.	10th	

Season	Tier	Division	Place	Copa del Rey
1992–93	5	Int. Pref.	13th	
1993–94	5	Int. Pref.	4th	
1994–95	5	Int. Pref.	2nd	
1995–96	5	Int. Pref.	1st	
1996–97	4	3ª	17th	
1997–98	4	3ª	20th	
1998–99	5	Int. Pref.	16th	
1999–2000	6	1ª Int.	10th	
2000–01	5	Int. Pref.	13th	
2001–02	5	Int. Pref.	17th	
2002–03	6	1ª Int.	1st	
2003–04	5	Int. Pref.	5th	
2004–05	5	Int. Pref.	10th	
2005–06	5	Int. Pref.	17th	
2006–07	5	Int. Pref.	9th	
2007–08	5	Int. Pref.	18th	
2008–09	6	1ª Int.	2nd	
2009–10	5	Int. Pref.	11th	
2010–11	5	Int. Pref.	11th	
2011–12	5	Int. Pref.	5th	

Season	Tier	Division	Place	Copa del Rey
2012–13	5	Int. Pref.	6th	
2013–14	5	Int. Pref.	1st	
2014–15	5	Int. Pref.	1st	
2015–16	5	Int. Pref.	1st	
2016–17	5	Int. Pref.	2nd	
2017–18	5	Int. Pref.	1st	
2018–19	5	Int. Pref.	2nd	
2019–20	4	3ª	5th	
2020–21	4	3ª	3rd / 5th	
2021–22	5	3ª RFEF	1st	
2022–23	4	2ª Fed.	11th	
2023–24	4	2ª Fed.	5th	
2024–25	4	2ª Fed.	18th	First round
2025–26	5	3ª Fed.	1st	
2026–27	4	2ª Fed.		TBD

- 4 seasons in Segunda Federación
- 6 seasons in Tercera División
- 2 seasons in Tercera Federación/Tercera División RFEF
