= UD Los Llanos de Aridane =

Los Llanos
- Full name: Unión Deportiva; Los Llanos de Aridane
- Founded: 1996
- Ground: Aceró, Los Llanos de Aridane, Canary Islands, Spain
- Capacity: 2,000
- Chairman: (Spain) Juan Vicente Hernández
- Manager: (Spain) Jorge Muñoz
- League: Tercera Federación – Group 12
- 2025–26: Interinsular Preferente, 3rd of 20 (promoted)
Home colours	Away colours

Unión Deportiva Los Llanos de Aridane is a football team based in Los Llanos de Aridane, in the Canary Islands. Founded in 1996, it plays in Tercera Federación – Group 12. Its stadium is Estadio Aceró with a capacity of 2,000 seats.

== History ==
- UD Los Llanos was founded in 1996 following a merger of CD Argual, SD Velia and UD Aridane. The team played in regional divisions until 2008 when debuting in Tercera División (2008–09 season).

== Season to season ==
Season	Tier	Division	Place	Copa del Rey
1996–97	6	1ª Terr.	7th	
1997–98	6	1ª Terr.	1st	
1998–99	5	Int. Pref.	6th	
1999–2000	5	Int. Pref.	6th	
2000–01	5	Int. Pref.	5th	
2001–02	5	Int. Pref.	11th	
2002–03	5	Int. Pref.	4th	
2003–04	5	Int. Pref.	3rd	
2004–05	5	Int. Pref.	15th	
2005–06	5	Int. Pref.	9th	
2006–07	5	Int. Pref.	12th	
2007–08	5	Int. Pref.	3rd	
2008–09	4	3ª	6th	
2009–10	4	3ª	20th	
2010–11	5	Int. Pref.	15th	
2011–12	5	Int. Pref.	9th	
2012–13	5	Int. Pref.	9th	
2013–14	5	Int. Pref.	2nd	
2014–15	5	Int. Pref.	2nd	
2015–16	5	Int. Pref.	5th	

Season	Tier	Division	Place	Copa del Rey
2016–17	5	Int. Pref.	3rd	
2017–18	4	3ª	20th	
2018–19	5	Int. Pref.	1st	
2019–20	5	Int. Pref.	1st	
2020–21	5	Int. Pref.	3rd	
2021–22	6	Int. Pref.	3rd	
2022–23	6	Int. Pref.	8th	
2023–24	6	Int. Pref.	1st	
2024–25	5	3ª Fed.	17th	
2025–26	6	Int. Pref.	3rd	
2026–27	5	3ª Fed.		

- 3 seasons in Tercera División
- 2 seasons in Tercera Federación
