= San Miguel de Abona =

- Municipality
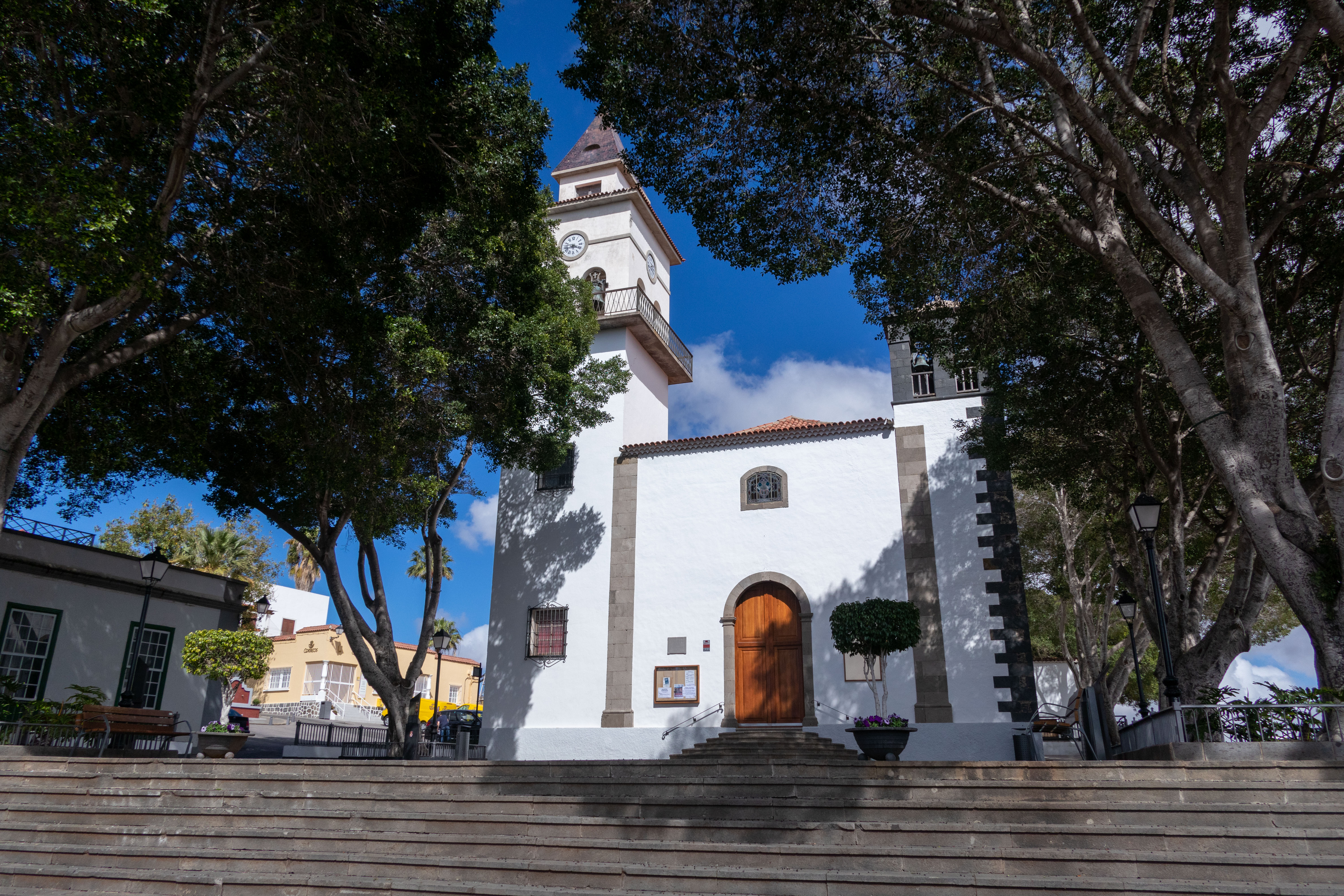

- Flag Coat of arms

- Municipal location in Tenerife

- Location in Province of Santa Cruz de Tenerife San Miguel de Abona (Canary Islands) San Miguel de Abona (Spain, Canary Islands)
- Coordinates: 28°6′N 16°37′W
- Sovereign state: Spain
- Autonomous community: Canary Islands
- Province: Santa Cruz de Tenerife
- Island: Tenerife

Area
  - Total: 42.04 km^{2} (16.23 sq mi)

Population (2025-01-01)
  - Total: 23,960
  - Density: 569.9/km^{2} (1,476/sq mi)
- Time zone: UTC+0 (GMT)
- Climate: Csb
- Website: www.sanmigueldeabona.es

San Miguel de Abona is a town and a municipality in the southern part of the island of Tenerife, one of the Canary Islands, and part of the province of Santa Cruz de Tenerife, Spain. The TF-1 motorway passes through the southern part of the municipality.

The population is 16,099 (2013), its area is 42.04 km^{2}.

In the south of the municipality, on the coastline, lies the golf course and holiday/residential village of Golf del Sur. Also on the coast is Amarilla Golf & Country Club. Golf del Sur has hosted several professional golf tournaments including the Tenerife Open, the Tenerife Ladies Open.

== Historical population ==
Year	Population
1991	
1996	5,776
2001	8,398
2002	9,174
2003	9,988
2004	10,802
2013	16,099
2022	22,000

=== Birthplace ===
As for the place of birth, 54% of the inhabitants of the municipality were born in the Canary Islands, of which 48% had been born in the municipality itself, 44% in another municipality of the island and 8% came from another island of the archipelago. The rest of the population was 9% made up of peninsular mainland Spaniards and 37% born abroad.

Population by birthplace (2021)

Country of birth	Population
United Kingdom	2,299
Italy	1,182
Venezuela	649
Germany	475
Colombia	217
Cuba	210
Argentina	174
Belgium	172
Uruguay	153
China	141
