= 1979 in association football =

The following are the association football events of the year 1979 throughout the world.

== Events ==
- Copa Libertadores 1979: Won by Olimpia Asunción after defeating Boca Juniors on an aggregate score of 2–0.
- European Cup 1979: Won by Nottingham Forest after defeating Malmö FF 1–0 in the Final.
- Intercontinental Cup 1979: Won by Olimpia Asunción after defeating Malmö FF by an aggregate score of 3–1. This was the last time the Intercontinental Cup was played in two legs (South America and Europe).
- May 22 – Ruud Krol becomes Holland's most capped player in history when he plays his 65th match for the Netherlands national football team against Argentina.

== Winners club national championship ==
=== Asia ===
- Qatar: Al-Sadd SC

=== Europe ===
- Belgium: K.S.K. Beveren
- Bulgaria: PFC Levski Sofia
- Cyprus: Omonia Nicosia
- Denmark: Esbjerg fB
- England: Liverpool F.C.
- France: RC Strasbourg
- Greece: AEK Athens
- Hungary: Újpest FC
- Italy: AC Milan
- Netherlands: Ajax Amsterdam
- Poland: Ruch Chorzów
- Portugal: FC Porto
- Ireland: Dundalk F.C.
- Scotland: Celtic F.C.
- Spain: Real Madrid
- Turkey: Trabzonspor
- West Germany: Hamburger SV
- Soviet Union: FC Spartak Moscow

=== North and Central America ===
- Mexico: Cruz Azul
- United States / Canada:
  - Vancouver Whitecaps (NASL)

=== Oceania ===
- Australia: Marconi Fairfield

=== South America ===
- Argentina
  - Metropolitano – River Plate
  - Nacional – River Plate
- Brazil: Internacional
- Colombia: América de Cali
- Paraguay: Olimpia Asunción

== International tournaments ==
- 1979 British Home Championship (May 19 – May 26, 1979)

England

- Pan American Games in San Juan, Puerto Rico (July 2 – July 14, 1979)
  1. Brazil
  2. Cuba
  3. Argentina
- Copa América (July 10 – December 12, 1979)
  1. Paraguay
  2. Chile
  3. Brazil and Peru
- World Youth Championship (August 26 – September 7, 1979)
  1. Argentina
  2. Soviet Union
  3. Uruguay

== Births ==
- January 2 – Jonathan Greening, English footballer and coach
- January 4 – Shergo Biran, German footballer
- January 12 – Grzegorz Rasiak, Polish footballer
- January 15 – Martin Petrov, Bulgarian footballer
- January 26 – Maksym Kalynychenko, Ukrainian footballer
- January 30 – Possato (Alan dos Santos Possato), Brazilian footballer
- February 2 – Daniel Bierofka, German footballer
- February 4 – Dida, Brazilian footballer
- February 13 – Rafael Márquez, Mexican footballer
- February 19 – Steve Cherundolo, American soccer player
- February 20 – Denis Fladung, former Russian professional footballer
- March 2 – Damien Duff, Irish footballer
- March 4 – Vyacheslav Malafeev, Russian footballer
- March 14 – Neftalí Luna, Spanish retired footballer
- March 22 – Aldo Duscher, Argentine footballer
- April 3 – Christoph Spatzenegger, Austrian footballer
- April 5 – Timo Hildebrand, German footballer
- April 12 – Tobias Linderoth, Swedish footballer
- April 15 – Juan Pablo Belatti, Argentine football assistant referee
- April 20 – Ludovic Magnin, Swiss footballer
- April 26 – Fereydoon Zandi, Iranian-German footballer
- May 2 – Michael Brunswijk, Dutch former footballer
- May 11 – Tomás Jiménez, Spanish retired footballer
- May 19
  - Diego Forlán, Uruguayan footballer
  - Andrea Pirlo, Italian footballer
- May 25 – Marek Klimczok, Polish former professional footballer
- May 29 – Arne Friedrich, German footballer
- May 30 – Fabian Ernst, German footballer
- May 31 – Jean-Pascal Biezen, Dutch retired professional footballer
- June 4 – Naohiro Takahara, Japanese footballer
- June 7 – Kevin Hofland, Dutch footballer
- June 19 – José Kleberson, Brazilian footballer
- July 14 – Sergei Ignashevich, Russian footballer
- July 16 – Joé Flick, Luxembourgian footballer
- July 26 – Paul Freier, German footballer
- July 27 – Antonio Sarmiento, Spanish footballer
- August 7 – Pablo Salinas, Bolivian footballer
- August 12 – Júnior Izaguirre, Honduran footballer
- August 27 – Thierry Bayock, Cameroonian footballer
- August 28 – Bojan Gojak, Serbian former footballer
- August 29 – Amjad Al-Shuaibi, Jordanian footballer
- September 10 – Raúl Gaitán, Spanish retired footballer
- September 11
  - Eric Abidal, French footballer
  - Leon Cort, English footballer
  - David Pizarro, Chilean footballer
- September 13 – Julio de León, Honduran footballer
- September 15 – Dadash Kazikhanov, former Russian professional footballer
- October 8
  - Jorge Baliño, Argentine football referee
  - Doyle Vaca, Bolivian footballer
- October 9 – Gonzalo Sorondo, Uruguayan footballer
- October 15 – Paul Robinson, English footballer
- October 18 – Jaroslav Drobny, Czech footballer
- October 22 – Alex Matshameko, Motswana former footballer
- October 23 – Simon Davies, Welsh footballer
- October 30 – Simone Berardi, Italian former footballer
- November 2 – Marián Čišovský, Slovak footballer (d. 2020)
- November 5
  - Patrick Owomoyela, German footballer
  - David Suazo, Honduran footballer
- November 15 – Rowan Hendricks, South African footballer
- November 19 – Bentley Springer, Barbadian footballer
- November 20 – Dmitri Bulykin, Russian footballer
- November 21 – Vincenzo Iaquinta, Italian footballer
- December 7 – Diego Bengolea, Bolivian footballer
- December 14
  - Jean-Alain Boumsong, French footballer
  - Michael Owen, English footballer
- December 20 – Ashley Cole, English footballer
- December 26 – Stephano Wooding, Dutch former professional footballer
- December 30 – Hernán Boyero, Argentine footballer

== Deaths ==
=== February ===
- February 16 - Henk Steeman, Dutch midfielder, bronze medalist at the 1920 Summer Olympics. (85)

=== April ===
- April 11 – Mohamed Akid, Tunisian forward, capped 52 times for the Tunisia national football team. (29)
- April 18 – Pedro Arico Suárez, Argentine defender, runner up of the 1930 FIFA World Cup . (70)
- April 19 – August Sackenheim, German forward, capped 4 times for the Germany national football team. (73)
- April 22 – Amedeo Biavati, Italian midfielder, winner of the 1938 FIFA World Cup. (64)
- April 30 – Jaap Bulder, Dutch forward, bronze medalist at the 1920 Summer Olympics. (82)

=== July ===
- July 14 – Santos Urdinarán, Uruguayan striker, winner of the 1930 FIFA World Cup. (79)
- July 31 – José Della Torre, Argentine defender, runner up of the 1930 FIFA World Cup . (73)

=== August ===
- August 21 – Giuseppe Meazza, Italian striker, winner of the 1934 FIFA World Cup and 1938 FIFA World Cup, often seen as the best player of his era, and one of the greatest of all time. (68)

=== December ===
- December 12 - Hans Rohde, German defender, 25 times capped for the Germany national football team. (65)

== Movies ==
- Yesterday's Hero
