= Sarmento =

Sarmento is a Portuguese-language surname meaning "vine branch". Notable people with the surname include:

- Sarmento de Beires (1892–1974), Portuguese Army officer and an aviation pioneer
- Henrique Sarmento Malvar (born 1957), Microsoft engineer and senior signal processing researcher
- Claudio Wanderley Sarmento Neto (born 1982), Brazilian football (soccer) player
- Sarmento Rodrigues (1899–1979), naval officer, colonist and professor
- Filipe Sarmento (born 1985), Portuguese footballer
- Jacob de Castro Sarmento (1692–1762), Portuguese estrangeirado, physician, naturalist, poet and Deist
- Julião Sarmento (1948–2021), Portuguese multimedia artist and painter
- Luis Sarmento, the Imperial ambassador to Portugal in 1536
- Maria do Céu Sarmento, East Timorese politician
- Matthew Sarmento (born 1991), Canadian male field hockey player
- Maria Olga de Moraes Sarmento da Silveira (1881–1948), Portuguese writer and feminist
- Nelson Sarmento Viegas (born 1999), football player

== See also ==
- Ponte Almirante Sarmento Rodrigues, road bridge over the Douro, near the village of Barca d'Alva in Guarda District, Portugal
- Sarmentose (disambiguation)
- Sarmiento (disambiguation)
- Sarmientoia
- Sarmientola
