= Gojak =

Gojak is a surname. It may refer to:

- Amer Gojak (born 1997), Bosnian association footballer
- Bojan Gojak (born 1979), Serbian association footballer
- Lana Gojak (born 1983), Croatian actress
- Linda Gojak, American mathematics educator
- Mira Gojak (1963), Australian artist

== See also ==
- Gojak Hydroelectric Power Plant
