= Sarmiento (surname) =

Sarmiento is a surname meaning grape vine in Spanish. Notable people with the name include:

== Arts ==
- Ashley Sarmiento, Filipino actress
- Basilio L. Sarmiento, Filipino poet
- Eduardo Sarmiento, Cuban-American artist
- Eugenia Belin Sarmiento, Argentine painter and author
- Félix Rubén García Sarmiento, Nicaraguan poet
- Gabriella Sarmiento Wilson, American-Filipino singer
- Marcel Sarmiento, American film director
- Pablo Sarmiento, Filipino comedian
- Saulo Sarmiento, Spanish acrobat
- Valeria Sarmiento, Chilean film director
- Wenceslaus Sarmiento, American architect

== Religion ==
- Diego Sarmiento Valladares, Spanish bishop
- Enrique Sarmiento, Colombian Roman Catholic bishop
- José Manuel Quiroga Sarmiento, Argentine priest
- Martín Sarmiento, Galician Enlightenment priest
- Pedro Sarmiento (cardinal), Spanish bishop and cardinal

== Journalism ==
- Abraham Sarmiento Jr., Filipino journalist
- Carmen Sarmiento, Spanish journalist and TV presenter
- Filadelfo Sánchez Sarmiento, Mexican radio journalist
- Judith Sarmiento (born 1954), Colombian lawyer and journalist

== Politics ==
- Alfonso Valdivieso Sarmiento, Colombian lawyer and politician
- Angelito Sarmiento, Filipino politician
- Domingo Faustino Sarmiento, President of Argentina
- Edgar Mary Sarmiento, Filipino politician
- José Sarmiento de Valladares, 1st Duke of Atrisco, Viceroy of New Spain
- Juana de J. Sarmiento (1899–1979), Colombian politician, activist
- Luis Carlos Galán Sarmiento (1943–1989), Colombian politician
- Mel Senen Sarmiento, Filipino politician

== Public service ==
- Abraham Sarmiento, Filipino jurist
- Diego Sarmiento de Acuña, 1st Count of Gondomar, Spanish diplomat
- Lina Sarmiento, Director of the Philippine National Police
- María José Sarmiento, Argentine judge

== Science ==
- Esteban Sarmiento, Primatologist and biologist
- Raúl Chávez Sarmiento, Peruvian mathematician

== Sport ==
- Andrés Sarmiento, Colombian footballer
- Antonio Sarmiento, Spanish footballer
- Aarón Sarmiento, Spanish sailor
- Brian Sarmiento, Argentine footballer
- Cayetano Sarmiento, Spanish road bicycle racer
- Daniel Sarmiento, Argentine boxer
- Darío Sarmiento, Argentine footballer
- Ignacio Sarmiento, Spanish hurdler
- Ismael Sarmiento (born 1973), Colombian road cyclist
- Jeremy Sarmiento, Ecuadorian footballer
- Jorge Sarmiento, Peruvian footballer
- Luis Sarmiento, Cuban wrestler
- Manny Sarmiento, Venezuelan baseball player
- Marcelo Sarmiento, Argentine footballer
- Mauro Sarmiento, Italian martial artist
- Pedro Sarmiento, Colombian football manager
- Raymond Sarmiento, American tennis player

== Others ==
- Luis Carlos Sarmiento, Colombian billionaire
- Pedro Sarmiento de Gamboa, Spanish explorer

== See also ==
- Sarmiento (disambiguation)
