= Ramón Docobo =

Spanish footballer

Personal information
- Full name: Ramón Ángel Fernández Docobo
- Date of birth: 15 September 1962 (age 64)
- Place of birth: Ribadeo, Spain
- Height: 1.88 m (6 ft 2 in)
- Position: Goalkeeper

Senior career*
| Years | Team | Apps | (Gls) |
| 1981–1989 | Deportivo La Coruña | 2 | (0) |
| 1984 | → Fabril Deportivo (loan) | | |
| 1987–1988 | → Lalín (loan) | 31 | (0) |
| 1989–1995 | Compostela | 84 | (0) |
| 1995–1996 | Castellón | 17 | (0) |
| Total | | 134 | (0) |
- * Club domestic league appearances and goals

Ramón Ángel Fernández Docobo (born 15 September 1962) is a Spanish former footballer who played as a goalkeeper. He spent eight years at Deportivo La Coruña, but made very few first team appearances, and later had a six-year spell at Compostela, which included two appearances in the 1994–95 La Liga season.

== Career ==
Docobo was born in Ribadeo in the province of Lugo in Galicia, and began his career with Galician club Deportivo La Coruña. He made his debut, aged just 19, in a Segunda División match away at Burgos at Estadio El Plantío on 11 April 1982, which Depor lost 1–0. He was never a regular player for Deportivo, and had to wait until the 1986–87 season to make his second appearance, although he did spend some time playing for Fabril Deportivo, effectively a Depor B team. He spent the 1987–88 season on loan at Lalín in Segunda División B, and had a successful season, playing 32 matches despite being sent off in his first appearance, a 3–1 away win over Arosa on 30 August.

Docobo left Deportivo in the summer of 1989, having made just four first team appearances in eight seasons. He joined fellow Galician side Compostela, and they earned promotion by winning their Tercera División group in his first season. They won a second consecutive promotion, via the play-offs, in 1990–91, with Docobo playing a key part. The only negative point of the season was the second red card of his career, which came in a 1–1 away draw with Leganés on 10 March. He kept his first choice status for Compostela's first season in the second tier, but lost it to Carlos Mariño in 1992–93.

Docobo didn't make any league appearances in 1993–94 as Compostela earned yet another promotion, reaching La Liga for the first time in their history. He did play twice the following season, allowing him to make his top flight debut on 10 June 1995. Aitor Iru was dismissed with 36 minutes to play in the away fixture against Valencia at Mestalla Stadium, and Docobo was brought on for Jesús Moure to fill in. The score at that time was 1–1, but Docobo conceded three times in the last fifteen minutes - twice to Lyuboslav Penev and once to Fernando - as Compostela lost 4–1.

Docobo left Compos that summer, and spent a single season with Castellón in Segunda División B before retiring in 1996 as he approached his 34th birthday.

== Honours ==
Compostela

- Tercera División: 1989–90

== Career statistics ==
| Club | Season | League | | | Cup | | Other | | Total | |
| Club | Season | Division | Apps | Goals | Apps | Goals | Apps | Goals | Apps | Goals |
|---|---|---|---|---|---|---|---|---|---|---|
| Deportivo La Coruña | 1981–82 | Segunda División | 1 | 0 | 0 | 0 | – | | 1 | 0 |
| Deportivo La Coruña | 1984–85 | Segunda División | 0 | 0 | 0 | 0 | – | | 0 | 0 |
| Deportivo La Coruña | 1985–86 | Segunda División | 0 | 0 | 0 | 0 | – | | 0 | 0 |
| Deportivo La Coruña | 1986–87 | Segunda División | 1 | 0 | 2 | 0 | – | | 3 | 0 |
| Deportivo La Coruña | 1987–88 | Segunda División | 0 | 0 | 0 | 0 | – | | 0 | 0 |
| Deportivo La Coruña | 1988–89 | Segunda División | 0 | 0 | 0 | 0 | – | | 0 | 0 |
| Deportivo La Coruña | Total | | 2 | 0 | 2 | 0 | 0 | 0 | 4 | 0 |
| Fabril Deportivo | 1984–85 | Tercera División | ? | ? | 2 | 0 | – | | 2 | 0 |
| Lalín | 1987–88 | Segunda División B | 31 | 0 | 1 | 0 | – | | 32 | 0 |
| Compostela | 1990–91 | Segunda División B | 38 | 0 | 3 | 0 | 6 | 0 | 47 | 0 |
| Compostela | 1991–92 | Segunda División | 32 | 0 | 1 | 0 | – | | 33 | 0 |
| Compostela | 1992–93 | Segunda División | 12 | 0 | 0 | 0 | – | | 12 | 0 |
| Compostela | 1993–94 | Segunda División | 0 | 0 | 3 | 0 | 0 | 0 | 3 | 0 |
| Compostela | 1994–95 | La Liga | 2 | 0 | 0 | 0 | – | | 2 | 0 |
| Compostela | Total | | 84 | 0 | 7 | 0 | 6 | 0 | 97 | 0 |
| Castellón | 1995–96 | Segunda División B | 17 | 0 | 2 | 0 | – | | 19 | 0 |
| Career total | | | 134 | 0 | 14 | 0 | 6 | 0 | 154 | 0 |

1. Appearances in the 1991 Segunda División B play-offs
