= Antonio Tapia =

Spanish footballer and manager (born 1959)

Personal information
- Full name: Antonio Tapia Flores
- Date of birth: 13 November 1959 (age 66)
- Place of birth: Baena, Spain

Youth career
- Fuengirola

Senior career*
Years	Team	Apps	(Gls)
- Málaga B
- Fuengirola

Managerial career
- 1986–1989: Mijas
- 1989–1992: Fuengirola
- 1992–1994: Los Boliches
- 1997–2001: Poli Ejido
- 2002–2005: Málaga B
- 2005–2006: Málaga
- 2006–2007: Poli Ejido
- 2007–2008: Granada 74
- 2008–2009: Málaga
- 2009–2010: Betis
- 2011: Tenerife
- * Club domestic league appearances and goals

Antonio Tapia Flores (born 13 November 1959) is a Spanish football manager.

== Career ==
Born in Baena, Córdoba, Tapia had an unassuming career as a footballer, only representing Málaga B and amateurs Fuengirola. Still not in his 30s, he began a coaching career with another club in Andalusia, Mijas, continuing in the area (and the regional leagues) the following years, with Fuengirola and Los Boliches.

In 1994, Tapia joined Málaga's coaching staff as assistant, staying there for two years before moving in the same capacity to neighbouring Cádiz. He had his first spell as head manager with Polideportivo Ejido – still in Andalusia – in 1997, helping the side promote to Segunda División in 2001, although he would be sacked 11 matches into the following campaign due to poor results.

Tapia returned to Málaga's reserves in 2002, attaining another second-division promotion. After Gregorio Manzano's dismissal midway through the 2004–05 season, he took the reins of the first team – in La Liga– being fired in January 2006 and replaced by director of football Manolo Hierro, in an eventual relegation.

The following two years, Tapia had spells in the second tier and his native region, with Ejido and soon-to-be defunct Granada 74, with relegation in the latter. He then returned to the top flight and Málaga – recently promoted– and almost led the team to qualification for the UEFA Europa League, after finishing eighth.

Having rejected a new deal in order to listen to other offers, Tapia would eventually leave his place to Juan Ramón López Muñiz (who returned from Racing de Santander), signing with Real Betis of division two. After a series of bad results, the last a 1–0 loss at Levante, he was relieved of his duties on 24 January 2010, only being in charge for six months.

Exactly one year after his dismissal, Tapia was appointed at Tenerife, becoming the Canary Islands side's third manager in the second-tier season. In late March, he too was dismissed.

Tapia returned to Málaga on 21 August 2012, joining the club's football directory as a sporting adviser.
