= CD Fuengirola =

Spanish football club

Fuengirola
- Full name: Club Deportivo Fuengirola
- Founded: 1931
- Dissolved: 1992
- Ground: Santa Fe de Los Boliches-Antonio Basilio
- Capacity: 2,500
- 1991–92: 2ª B – Group 4, 18th of 20
Home colours	Away colours

Club Deportivo Fuengirola was a football club based in Fuengirola, Andalusia. The club came to play 3 seasons in Segunda División B. Club Deportivo Fuengirola disappears in 1992.

In 1992, CD Fuengirola, CA Fuengirola and AD Balompédica Fuengirola merge into UD Fuengirola. In 2001, UD Fuengirola and CD Los Boliches merge into UD Fuengirola Los Boliches.

== Club background ==
Club Deportivo Fuengirola - (1931–1992) → ↓

Club Atlético Fuengirola - (1982–1992) → ↓

Unión Deportiva Fuengirola - (1992–2001) → ↓

Asociación Deportiva Balompédica Fuengirola - (1984–1992) → ↑

Unión Deportiva Fuengirola Los Boliches - (2001–present)

Club Deportivo Los Boliches - (1973–2001) → ↑

== Season to season ==
Season	Tier	Division	Place	Copa del Rey
1931–1959	—	Regional	—	
1959–60	4	1ª Reg.	3rd	
1960–61	4	1ª Reg.	7th	
1961–62	4	1ª Reg.		
1962–63	3	3ª	8th	
1963–64	3	3ª	8th	
1964–65	3	3ª	6th	
1965–66	3	3ª	10th	
1966–67	3	3ª	14th	
1967–68	3	3ª	11th	
1968–69	4	1ª Reg.	7th	
1969–70	4	1ª Reg.	13th	
1970–71	4	1ª Reg.	19th	
1971–72	4	1ª Reg.	17th	
1972–73	4	1ª Reg.	10th	
1973–74	4	1ª Reg.	7th	
1974–75	4	1ª Reg.	13th	

Season	Tier	Division	Place	Copa del Rey
1975–76	5	1ª Reg.	2nd	
1976–77	4	Reg. Pref.	19th	
1977–78	6	1ª Reg.	10th	
1978–79	6	1ª Reg.	7th	
1979–80	6	1ª Reg.	5th	
1980–81	5	Reg. Pref.	1st	
1981–82	4	3ª	1st	
1982–83	3	2ª B	18th	First round
1983–84	4	3ª	1st	
1984–85	4	3ª	8th	First round
1985–86	4	3ª	19th	
1986–87	5	Reg. Pref.	4th	
1987–88	5	Reg. Pref.	2nd	
1988–89	4	3ª	5th	
1989–90	4	3ª	2nd	
1990–91	3	2ª B	8th	Second round
1991–92	3	2ª B	18th	Second round

- 3 seasons in Segunda División B
- 12 seasons in Tercera División
