= CD Los Boliches =

Association football club in Spain

Los Boliches
- Full name: Club Deportivo Los Boliches
- Founded: 1973
- Dissolved: 2001
- Ground: Municipal, Fuengirola, Andalusia, Spain
- Capacity: 2,000
Home colours

Club Deportivo Los Boliches was a Spanish football team based in Fuengirola, Málaga, in the autonomous community of Andalusia. Founded in 1973, it was dissolved in 2001 after a merger with UD Fuengirola, thus becoming UD Fuengirola Los Boliches.

== Club background ==
Club Deportivo Fuengirola - (1931–1992) → ↓

Club Atlético Fuengirola - (1982–1992) → ↓

Unión Deportiva Fuengirola - (1992–2001) → ↓

Asociación Deportiva Balompédica Fuengirola - (1984–1992) → ↑

Unión Deportiva Fuengirola Los Boliches - (2001–present)

Club Deportivo Los Boliches - (1973–2001) → ↑

== Season to season ==
Season	Tier	Division	Place	Copa del Rey
1976–77	6	2ª Reg.	8th	
1977–78	7	2ª Reg.	13th	
1978–79	7	2ª Reg.	4th	
1979–80	7	2ª Reg.	8th	
1980–81	6	1ª Reg.	1st	
1981–82	5	Reg. Pref.	4th	
1982–83	6	1ª Reg.	6th	
1983–84	6	1ª Reg.	3rd	
1984–85	5	Reg. Pref.	5th	
1985–86	5	Reg. Pref.	4th	
1986–87	5	Reg. Pref.	1st	
1987–88	4	3ª	13th	
1988–89	4	3ª	2nd	

Season	Tier	Division	Place	Copa del Rey
1989–90	4	3ª	1st	
1990–91	3	2ª B	15th	Third round
1991–92	3	2ª B	19th	Third round
1992–93	4	3ª	15th	Second round
1993–94	4	3ª	19th	
1994–95	5	Reg. Pref.	7th	
1995–96	5	Reg. Pref.	5th	
1996–97	5	Reg. Pref.	4th	
1997–98	5	Reg. Pref.	6th	
1998–99	5	Reg. Pref.	3rd	
1999–2000	5	Reg. Pref.	1st	
2000–01	4	3ª	19th	

- 2 seasons in Segunda División B
- 6 seasons in Tercera División
