= UD Fuengirola =

Fuengirola
- Full name: Unión Deportiva Fuengirola
- Founded: 1992
- Dissolved: 2001
- Ground: Municipal, Fuengirola, Andalusia, Spain
- Capacity: 2,000
- 2000–01: 3ª – Group 9, 20th of 20
Home colours	Away colours

Unión Deportiva Fuengirola was a football club based in Fuengirola, Málaga, in the autonomous community of Andalusia. Founded in 1992 after a merger of CD Fuengirola, Atlético Fuengirola and Balompédica Fuengirola. It was dissolved in 2001 after a merger with CD Los Boliches thus becoming UD Fuengirola Los Boliches.

== Club background ==
Club Deportivo Fuengirola - (1931–1992) → ↓

Club Atlético Fuengirola - (1982–1992) → ↓

Unión Deportiva Fuengirola - (1992–2001) → ↓

Asociación Deportiva Balompédica Fuengirola - (1984–1992) → ↑

Unión Deportiva Fuengirola Los Boliches - (2001–present)

Club Deportivo Los Boliches - (1973–2001) → ↑

== Season to season ==
Season	Tier	Division	Place	Copa del Rey
1992–93	5	Reg. Pref.	5th	First round
1993–94	5	Reg. Pref.	11th	
1994–95	5	Reg. Pref.	3rd	
1995–96	5	Reg. Pref.	2nd	
1996–97	4	3ª	9th	
1997–98	4	3ª	20th	
1998–99	5	Reg. Pref.	7th	
1999–2000	5	Reg. Pref.	2nd	
2000–01	4	3ª	20th	

- 3 seasons in Tercera División
