= 1990–91 Segunda División B =

Segunda División B
- Season: 1990–91
- Champions: Badajoz; Barcelona Atlètic; Racing Santander; Real Madrid Deportivo
- Promoted: Barcelona Atlètic; Compostela; Mérida; Racing Santander; Real Madrid Deportivo
- Relegated: Alcalá; Andorra; Durango; Eldense; Izarra; Langreo; Las Palmas Atlético; Mallorca Atlético; Manacor; Mirandés; Móstoles; Olímpic; Pegaso; Sevilla Atlético; Telde; Teruel; Toledo
- Matches: 1,520
- Goals: 3,268 (2.15 per match)
- Top goalscorer: Juan Gómez (24 goals)
- Best goalkeeper: José Domínguez (0.55 goals/match)
- Biggest home win: Compostela 6–0 Pegaso (9 September 1990); Vetusta 6–0 Pegaso (7 October 1990); Alcoyano 7–1 Manacor (21 October 1990); Osasuna 7–1 Gimnástica (18 November 1990); Badajoz 6–0 Sanluqueño (24 February 1991); Benidorm 6–0 Manacor (24 February 1991)
- Biggest away win: Yeclano 0–7 Eldense (13 January 1991); Teruel 0–7 Mollerussa (14 April 1991)
- Highest scoring: Alcoyano 7–1 Manacor (21 October 1990); Osasuna 7–1 Gimnástica (18 November 1990); As Pontes 4–4 Cambados (12 May 1991)
- Longest winning run: 8 matches Badajoz
- Longest unbeaten run: 20 matches Alavés
- Longest winless run: 14 matches Izarra; Las Palmas Atlético
- Longest losing run: 9 matches Olímpic

The 1990–91 Segunda División B season was the 14th since its establishment. The first matches of the season were played on 1 September 1990, and the season ended on 23 June 1991 with the promotion play-off final games.

== Overview before the season ==
80 teams joined the league, including four relegated from the 1989–90 Segunda División and 18 promoted from the 1989–90 Tercera División. The composition of the groups was determined by the Royal Spanish Football Federation, attending to geographical criteria.

Relegated from Segunda División

- Racing Santander
- Real Madrid Deportivo
- Recreativo
- Atlético Madrileño

Promoted from Tercera División

- Compostela
- Vetusta
- Gimnástica Torrelavega
- Alavés
- Sant Andreu
- Torrent
- Móstoles
- Palencia
- Los Boliches
- Fuengirola
- Betis Deportivo
- Manacor
- Las Palmas Atlético
- Yeclano
- Extremadura
- Izarra
- Huesca
- Valdepeñas

== Group 1 ==
Teams from Asturias, Castile and Leon, Galicia and Madrid.

=== Teams ===
Location of teams in Segunda División B Gr. 1 1990–91

Team	Founded	Home city	Stadium
Alcalá	1923	Alcalá de Henares, Madrid	El Val
As Pontes	1960	As Pontes, Galicia	O Poboado
Atlético Madrileño	1969	Madrid, Madrid	Vicente Calderón
Real Ávila	1923	Ávila, Castile and Leon	Adolfo Suárez
Cambados	1963	Cambados, Galicia	Burgáns
Compostela	1962	Santiago de Compostela, Galicia	Santa Isabel
Cultural Leonesa	1923	León, Castile and Leon	Antonio Amilvia
Getafe	1983	Getafe, Madrid	Las Margaritas
Langreo	1961	Langreo, Asturias	Ganzábal
Leganés	1928	Leganés, Madrid	Luis Rodríguez de Miguel
Lugo	1953	Lugo, Galicia	Anxo Carro
Móstoles	1955	Móstoles, Madrid	El Soto
Orense	1952	Ourense, Galicia	O Couto
Palencia	1975	Palencia, Castile and León	La Balastera
Pegaso	1962	Tres Cantos, Madrid	La Foresta
Ponferradina	1922	Ponferrada, Castile and Leon	Fuentesnuevas
Pontevedra	1941	Pontevedra, Galicia	Pasarón
Real Madrid B	1930	Madrid, Madrid	Ciudad Deportiva
Sporting Atlético	1960	Gijón, Asturias	Mareo
Vetusta	1930	Oviedo, Asturias	Carlos Tartiere

=== League table ===
Pos	Team	Pld	W	D	L	GF	GA	GD	Pts	Qualification or relegation
1	Real Madrid Deportivo (P)	38	20	13	5	44	25	+19	53	Qualification for the promotion playoffs
2	Lugo	38	16	15	7	38	23	+15	47 (Note: Lugo finished ahead of Compostela on head-to-head points: Lugo–Compostela 1–1, Compostela–Lugo 1–2)	Qualification for the promotion playoffs
3	Compostela (P)	38	18	11	9	44	31	+13	47	Qualification for the promotion playoffs
4	Getafe	38	16	13	9	45	24	+21	45	Qualification for the promotion playoffs
5	Leganés	38	12	19	7	38	27	+11	43 (Note: Leganés finished ahead of Palencia on head-to-head points: Palencia–Leganés 0–0, Leganés–Palencia 4–1)	
6	Palencia	38	15	13	10	34	28	+6	43	
7	Ourense	38	12	17	9	40	36	+4	41 (Note: Ourense finished ahead of Atlético Madrileño on head-to-head points: Atlético Madrid B–Ourense 1–1, Ourense–Atlético Madrileño 2–1)	
8	Atlético Madrileño	38	16	9	13	51	44	+7	41	
9	Cultural Leonesa	38	11	18	9	40	38	+2	40	
10	Vetusta	38	14	11	13	42	44	−2	39 (Note: Vetusta finished ahead of Ávila on head-to-head points: Ávila–Vetusta 0–2, Vetusta–Ávila 3–1)	
11	Ávila	38	9	21	8	32	26	+6	39	
12	Sporting Atlético	38	12	14	12	49	48	+1	38 (Note: Sporting Atlético finished ahead of As Pontes on head-to-head points: As Pontes–Sporting Atlético 1–1, Sporting Atlético–As Pontes 2–1)	
13	As Pontes	38	12	14	12	42	36	+6	38	
14	Pontevedra	38	9	17	12	28	33	−5	35 (Note: Pontevedra finished ahead of Ponferradina on head-to-head points: Pontevedra–Ponferradina 2–1, Ponferradina–Pontevedra 0–0)	
15	Ponferradina	38	10	15	13	32	38	−6	35	
16	Cambados	38	11	10	17	32	42	−10	32	
17	Pegaso	38	6	18	14	29	47	−18	30	Relegation to Tercera División
18	Langreo	38	9	11	18	31	51	−20	29	Relegation to Tercera División
19	Móstoles	38	7	14	17	26	41	−15	28	Relegation to Tercera División
20	Alcalá	38	6	5	27	22	57	−35	17	Relegation to Tercera División

Source: BDFútbol
Rules for classification: 1) points; 2) head-to-head points; 3) head-to-head goal difference; 4) goal difference; 5) number of goals scored
(P) Promoted

=== Results ===
Home \ Away	ALC	ASP	ATM	AVA	CAM	COM	CUL	GET	LAN	LEG	LUG	MOS	ORE	PAL	PEG	PNF	PNT	RMB	SPO	VET
Alcalá	—	0–4	0–2	1–3	3–2	2–3	2–0	0–3	1–1	0–1	0–1	4–1	0–0	1–3	1–0	0–1	1–0	0–2	1–0	0–0
As Pontes	2–1	—	0–2	0–0	4–4	3–1	0–0	0–0	4–0	1–1	1–1	1–0	1–0	2–0	1–1	3–0	0–0	4–0	1–1	1–1
Atlético Madrileño	2–0	3–1	—	1–1	1–1	0–2	2–1	1–0	3–1	1–0	2–2	1–1	1–1	2–0	0–3	3–1	1–0	0–0	0–0	4–0
Real Ávila	1–0	1–0	0–1	—	3–0	2–0	1–1	1–1	4–0	1–1	0–0	2–0	0–0	1–1	1–1	2–1	1–1	0–0	1–1	0–2
Cambados	1–0	1–0	2–1	1–0	—	0–1	1–0	2–0	1–0	2–1	0–0	0–1	0–0	0–0	1–0	4–0	1–2	0–0	2–1	0–1
Compostela	1–0	1–1	1–0	0–0	2–0	—	0–2	0–0	2–1	2–0	1–2	1–0	1–1	2–1	6–0	1–0	2–0	1–0	2–1	0–0
Cultural Leonesa	1–1	3–0	1–0	1–1	2–1	0–0	—	3–0	1–0	1–3	0–0	1–0	1–0	0–0	3–2	0–0	1–1	1–1	2–0	0–0
Getafe	3–1	2–0	1–0	2–0	0–0	3–0	2–2	—	4–0	1–1	1–1	0–0	5–1	2–0	0–1	1–1	3–0	1–0	1–0	2–1
Langreo	3–0	1–0	2–5	0–0	2–1	1–0	0–0	0–2	—	2–0	1–2	4–0	1–1	0–1	0–0	0–1	0–0	0–0	3–2	1–0
Leganés	2–0	2–0	3–0	1–1	1–0	1–1	2–2	1–0	1–1	—	0–0	1–1	1–0	4–1	3–0	0–0	0–0	0–0	0–0	1–1
Lugo	1–0	1–2	3–1	0–0	3–0	1–1	0–0	1–1	3–1	1–0	—	4–0	1–1	0–1	2–1	1–0	0–1	1–1	2–0	1–0
Móstoles	0–0	0–1	3–3	0–0	3–2	0–1	0–1	2–0	0–0	0–2	2–0	—	2–1	0–0	1–1	0–0	0–0	0–1	1–1	2–0
Orense	3–0	0–1	2–1	0–0	1–0	2–1	1–0	1–2	0–0	1–1	1–0	2–1	—	1–0	0–0	2–1	2–0	1–1	5–2	1–1
Palencia	1–0	1–0	1–0	1–1	0–0	1–1	1–1	0–0	3–0	0–0	2–0	1–0	0–0	—	1–0	2–1	2–0	0–1	1–1	3–0
Pegaso	2–1	0–0	0–2	0–0	1–1	0–1	1–1	0–0	1–1	0–1	0–1	1–0	2–2	2–0	—	0–0	3–2	0–0	1–2	1–1
Ponferradina	1–0	0–0	3–1	1–0	1–0	2–0	3–2	0–2	1–2	2–1	0–1	0–0	3–0	0–0	1–1	—	0–0	1–1	1–1	1–1
Pontevedra	1–0	1–1	0–0	0–1	1–1	0–0	1–1	0–0	3–1	0–0	1–0	1–0	0–0	0–1	1–1	2–1	—	0–2	3–0	0–0
Real Madrid B	3–1	2–1	2–0	1–0	1–0	2–1	4–2	1–0	1–0	0–0	0–0	1–4	3–0	1–0	3–2	1–1	2–1	—	3–0	2–0
Sporting Atlético	1–0	2–1	1–2	2–1	4–0	1–1	5–1	1–0	1–0	1–1	0–0	2–1	2–2	3–2	0–0	1–1	4–1	2–0	—	3–3
Vetusta	1–0	2–0	4–2	3–1	1–0	1–3	2–1	1–0	2–1	3–0	0–1	0–0	0–4	1–2	6–0	2–1	0–4	0–1	1–0	—

Source: BDFútbol
Legend: Blue = home team win; Yellow = draw; Red = away team win.

=== Top goalscorers ===
Goalscorers	Goals	Team
(Spain) Manuel Alfaro	18	Atlético Madrileño
(Nigeria) Mutiu Adepoju	17	Real Madrid Deportivo
(Spain) Pichi Lucas	17	Ourense
(Spain) Miguel Soro	12	Lugo
(Spain) Juanele	12	Sporting Atlético

=== Top goalkeepers ===
Goalkeeper	Goals	Matches	Average	Team
(Spain) José Domínguez	21	38	0.55	Lugo
(Spain) Pedro Caballero	24	38	0.63	Getafe
(Spain) Javi Jiménez	26	38	0.68	Ávila
(Spain) Javier Aguilera	27	38	0.71	Leganés
(Spain) Ramón Docobo	31	38	0.82	Compostela

== Group 2 ==
Teams from Andorra, Aragon, Basque Country, Cantabria, Catalonia, Castile and Leon and Navarre.

=== Teams ===
Location of teams in Segunda División B Gr. 2 1990–91

Team	Founded	Home city	Stadium
Alavés	1921	Vitoria-Gasteiz, Basque Country	Mendizorroza
Andorra CF	1957	Andorra, Aragon	Juan Antonio Endeiza
FC Andorra	1942	Andorra la Vella, Andorra	Comunal
Barakaldo	1917	Barakaldo, Basque Country	Lasesarre
Basconia	1913	Basauri, Basque Country	Basozelai
Binéfar	1922	Binéfar, Aragon	El Segalar
Deportivo Aragón	1958	Zaragoza, Aragon	Ciudad Deportiva del Real Zaragoza
Durango	1919	Durango, Basque Country	Tabira
Gimnástica de Torrelavega	1907	Torrelavega, Cantabria	El Malecón
Huesca	1960	Huesca, Aragon	El Alcoraz
Izarra	1924	Estella-Lizarra, Navarre	Merkatondoa
Lemona	1923	Lemoa, Basque Country	Arlonagusia
Mirandés	1927	Miranda de Ebro, Castile and Leon	Anduva
Mollerussa	1930	Mollerussa, Catalonia	Municipal Mollerussa
Numancia	1945	Soria, Castile and León	Los Pajaritos
Osasuna Promesas	1962	Aranguren, Navarre	Tajonar
Racing de Santander	1913	Santander, Cantabria	El Sardinero
San Sebastián	1951	San Sebastián, Basque Country	Atotxa
Santurtzi	1952	Santurtzi, Basque Country	San Jorge
Teruel	1954	Teruel, Aragon	Pinilla

=== League table ===
Pos	Team	Pld	W	D	L	GF	GA	GD	Pts	Qualification or relegation
1	Racing Santander (P)	38	22	10	6	67	32	+35	54	Qualification for the promotion playoffs
2	Alavés	38	21	10	7	61	28	+33	52	Qualification for the promotion playoffs
3	Osasuna Promesas	38	18	12	8	61	32	+29	48	Qualification for the promotion playoffs
4	San Sebastián	38	18	11	9	52	31	+21	47	Qualification for the promotion playoffs
5	Deportivo Aragón	38	17	10	11	59	36	+23	44	
6	Lemona	38	13	15	10	38	31	+7	41	
7	Barakaldo	38	12	16	10	37	34	+3	40 (Note: Barakaldo finished ahead of FC Andorra and Baskonia on head-to-head points: Barakaldo 6 pts, FC Andorra 3 pts, Baskonia 3 pts. FC Andorra finished ahead of Baskonia on head-to-head goal difference: FC Andorra–Baskonia 3–0, Baskonia–FC Andorra 2–0)	
8	FC Andorra	38	15	10	13	41	34	+7	40	
9	Baskonia	38	12	16	10	35	36	−1	40	
10	Mollerussa	38	15	9	14	51	36	+15	39	
11	Numancia	38	14	10	14	45	41	+4	38	
12	Gimnástica Torrelavega	38	10	16	12	33	40	−7	36	
13	Huesca	38	12	10	16	39	51	−12	34 (Note: Huesca finished ahead of Binéfar on head-to-head points: Binéfar–Huesca 0–0, Huesca–Binéfar 3–1)	
14	Binéfar	38	10	14	14	31	39	−8	34	
15	Santurtzi	38	8	16	14	29	43	−14	32	
16	Izarra	38	9	13	16	34	56	−22	31	Relegation to Tercera División
17	Mirandés	38	8	14	16	21	43	−22	30 (Note: Mirandés finished ahead of Durango and Andorra on head-to-head goal difference)	Relegation to Tercera División
18	Durango	38	9	12	17	23	43	−20	30	Relegation to Tercera División
19	Andorra	38	7	16	15	24	42	−18	30	Relegation to Tercera División
20	Teruel	38	5	10	23	29	82	−53	20	Relegation to Tercera División

Source: BDFútbol
Rules for classification: 1) points; 2) head-to-head points; 3) head-to-head goal difference; 4) goal difference; 5) number of goals scored
(P) Promoted

=== Results ===
Home \ Away	ALV	AND	FCA	BAR	BAS	BIN	DAR	DUR	GIM	HUE	IZA	LEM	MIR	MOL	NUM	OSA	RAC	SSE	SAN	TER
Alavés	—	4–0	2–0	0–1	1–0	3–0	1–1	2–1	0–1	2–0	5–0	1–1	1–0	1–1	0–0	2–1	1–0	2–1	2–1	5–1
Andorra CF	1–1	—	0–0	0–3	2–0	1–1	0–1	1–1	2–2	1–1	1–1	0–0	1–1	0–1	0–0	0–0	0–1	0–0	2–0	1–0
FC Andorra	0–1	3–1	—	0–0	3–0	2–1	0–2	3–2	2–1	1–0	3–0	1–1	2–0	4–0	1–0	1–2	0–0	2–1	0–0	2–2
Barakaldo	0–1	1–1	1–0	—	2–1	0–0	1–1	3–0	2–1	0–1	1–1	1–1	4–0	0–0	1–0	2–2	0–0	0–1	0–1	1–1
Basconia	0–0	0–0	2–1	3–3	—	1–1	2–0	0–0	0–0	0–0	2–1	1–1	0–0	2–2	0–4	1–0	1–0	4–1	1–1	3–1
Binéfar	0–2	1–0	0–1	1–1	1–2	—	1–0	2–1	0–0	0–0	1–0	0–0	1–3	0–1	1–0	0–1	3–0	1–0	3–0	2–0
Deportivo Aragón	2–1	3–0	2–0	1–1	0–1	0–1	—	0–0	2–0	2–1	3–0	2–0	1–1	3–2	6–2	3–0	1–2	0–2	0–0	5–0
Durango	2–1	0–1	0–0	1–2	1–0	0–0	1–0	—	1–1	2–1	0–2	1–1	1–0	1–1	1–0	0–3	0–0	0–1	1–0	1–1
Gim. Torrelavega	1–1	0–2	0–3	0–0	1–1	3–0	4–1	2–1	—	0–0	0–0	0–1	1–0	2–1	3–0	0–0	1–1	1–3	0–0	1–0
Huesca	2–1	1–0	1–0	2–2	0–2	3–1	3–3	3–0	2–1	—	2–0	1–2	0–1	2–1	2–1	1–3	0–2	1–0	0–0	1–3
Izarra	0–1	2–2	2–1	0–1	1–2	1–1	0–0	2–0	0–3	5–3	—	0–0	1–1	1–1	2–1	0–1	1–6	2–2	2–1	0–1
Lemona	0–3	3–0	2–1	1–0	1–0	1–0	0–1	0–0	0–1	1–1	4–0	—	1–0	1–0	0–1	1–1	3–1	1–2	0–0	3–0
Mirandés	1–4	2–0	0–2	0–1	0–0	1–1	1–0	1–1	0–0	0–0	0–0	1–0	—	1–3	1–0	0–0	0–1	0–0	0–0	1–0
Mollerussa	2–1	0–2	0–0	3–0	0–1	1–0	0–1	1–0	3–0	3–0	1–0	5–2	1–0	—	0–0	3–1	0–0	0–1	6–1	0–0
Numancia	2–2	2–0	1–0	3–1	1–1	1–1	2–1	0–1	0–0	2–0	0–1	2–0	4–0	2–0	—	3–1	1–1	0–0	1–0	3–2
Osasuna Prom.	1–2	2–0	1–1	2–0	0–0	2–0	2–1	4–0	7–1	1–0	1–0	0–0	4–0	2–0	1–1	—	0–1	1–1	5–1	3–0
Racing Santander	1–1	2–0	3–0	2–0	2–1	1–1	3–3	2–0	3–1	4–1	1–1	1–0	2–0	1–0	2–1	4–0	—	2–3	2–1	4–1
San Sebastián	2–0	1–0	2–0	3–0	2–0	2–2	1–1	1–0	1–0	0–0	0–1	1–1	4–0	1–0	5–1	1–1	1–2	—	3–1	1–1
Santurtzi	1–1	0–1	0–0	0–1	2–0	1–1	0–1	1–0	0–0	3–0	2–2	1–1	1–1	2–1	2–1	0–0	3–2	1–0	—	1–2
Teruel	0–2	1–1	1–2	0–0	1–1	3–1	0–5	0–1	0–0	1–3	1–2	0–3	0–3	0–7	1–2	1–5	1–5	2–1	0–0	—

Source: BDFútbol
Legend: Blue = home team win; Yellow = draw; Red = away team win.

=== Top goalscorers ===
Goalscorers	Goals	Team
(Spain) Moisés García	23	Deportivo Aragón
(Spain) Salvador Cardona	22	FC Andorra
(Spain) Juan Carlos de Diego	19	Racing Santander
(Spain) Alberto Recalde	15	Mollerussa
(Spain) Salva	14	Deportivo Aragón

=== Top goalkeepers ===
Goalkeeper	Goals	Matches	Average	Team
(Spain) Peio Aguirreoa	22	32	0.69	Alavés
(Spain) José María Ceballos	26	32	0.81	Racing Santander
(Spain) Juan Antonio Tinoko	31	37	0.84	Lemona
(Spain) Alfonso Núñez	32	38	0.84	Osasuna Promesas
(Spain) Eduard Abadal	29	33	0.88	Mollerussa

== Group 3 ==
Teams from Andalusia, Canary Islands, Castilla–La Mancha, Ceuta, Extremadura and Melilla.

=== Teams ===
Location of teams in Segunda División B Gr. 3 1990–91
Canary Islands

Team	Founded	Home city	Stadium
Badajoz	1905	Badajoz, Extremadura	Vivero
Betis Deportivo	1962	Seville, Andalusia	Benito Villamarín
Ceuta	1970	Ceuta	Alfonso Murube
Córdoba	1954	Córdoba, Andalusia	El Arcángel
Estepona	1947	Estepona, Andalusia	Francisco Muñoz Pérez
Extremadura	1924	Almendralejo, Extremadura	Francisco de la Hera
Fuengirola	1931	Fuengirola, Andalusia	Santa Fe de los Boliches
Granada	1931	Granada, Andalusia	Los Cármenes
Las Palmas Atlético	1959	Las Palmas, Canary Islands	Insular
Linense	1912	La Línea de la Concepción, Andalusia	Municipal La Línea de la Concepción
Los Boliches	1973	Fuengirola, Andalusia	Santa Fe de los Boliches
Marino	1936	Playa de las Américas, Canary Islands	Antonio Domínguez Alfonso
Melilla	1976	Melilla	Álvarez Claro
Mérida	1912	Mérida, Extremadura	Romano
Recreativo de Huelva	1889	Huelva, Andalusia	Colombino
Atlético Sanluqueño	1948	Sanlúcar de Barrameda, Andalusia	El Palmar
Sevilla Atlético	1950	Seville, Andalusia	Viejo Nervión
Telde	1965	Telde, Canary Islands	El Hornillo
Toledo	1928	Toledo, Castilla–La Mancha	Salto del Caballo
Valdepeñas	1956	Valdepeñas, Castilla–La Mancha	La Molineta

=== League table ===
Pos	Team	Pld	W	D	L	GF	GA	GD	Pts	Qualification or relegation
1	Badajoz	38	22	12	4	72	23	+49	56	Qualification for the promotion playoffs
2	Recreativo	38	21	9	8	50	22	+28	51 (Note: Recreativo finished ahead of Córdoba on head-to-head points: Recreativo–Córdoba 1–0, Córdoba–Recreativo 0–0)	Qualification for the promotion playoffs
3	Córdoba	38	21	9	8	52	30	+22	51	Qualification for the promotion playoffs
4	Mérida (P)	38	18	13	7	50	28	+22	49	Qualification for the promotion playoffs
5	Granada	38	15	17	6	49	29	+20	47	
6	Melilla	38	16	12	10	39	28	+11	44	
7	Ceuta (Note: Ceuta was dissolved at the end of the season)	38	14	10	14	37	47	−10	38 (Note: Ceuta finished ahead of Fuengirola on head-to-head points: Fuengirola–Ceuta 0–0, Ceuta–Fuengirola 1–0)	Dissolved
8	Fuengirola	38	12	14	12	25	32	−7	38	
9	Estepona	38	10	17	11	24	33	−9	37	
10	Betis Deportivo	38	12	11	15	47	46	+1	35 (Note: Betis Deportivo finished ahead of Valdepeñas on overall goal difference)	
11	Valdepeñas	38	12	11	15	38	44	−6	35	
12	Marino	38	11	12	15	37	50	−13	34 (Note: Marino finished ahead of Atlético Sanluqueño on head-to-head points: Atlético Sanluqueño–Marino 0–0, Marino–Atlético Sanluqueño 2–0)	
13	Atlético Sanluqueño	38	12	10	16	26	38	−12	34	
14	Extremadura	38	10	13	15	30	42	−12	33	
15	Los Boliches	38	8	15	15	25	43	−18	31 (Note: Los Boliches finished ahead of Linense and Toledo on head-to-head points: Los Boliches 5 pts, Linense 5 pts, Toledo 2 pts. Los Boliches finished ahead of Linense on head-to-head goal difference: Linense–Los Boliches 2–0, Los Boliches–Linense 3–0)	
16	Linense	38	12	7	19	39	48	−9	31	
17	Toledo	38	10	11	17	32	47	−15	31	Relegation to Tercera División
18	Sevilla Atlético	38	8	13	17	38	50	−12	29	Relegation to Tercera División
19	Telde	38	11	6	21	38	58	−20	28 (Note: Telde finished ahead of Las Palmas Atlético on head-to-head points: Las Palmas Atlético–Telde 2–2, Telde–Las Palmas Atlético 2–1)	Relegation to Tercera División
20	Las Palmas Atlético	38	6	16	16	34	44	−10	28	Relegation to Tercera División

Source: BDFútbol
Rules for classification: 1) points; 2) head-to-head points; 3) head-to-head goal difference; 4) goal difference; 5) number of goals scored
(P) Promoted

=== Results ===
Home \ Away	BAD	BET	CEU	COR	EST	EXT	FUE	GRA	LPA	LNS	LBO	MAR	MEL	MER	REC	SLU	SAT	TEL	TOL	VDP
Badajoz	—	1–1	2–0	1–1	3–0	3–0	3–1	3–0	1–1	3–0	3–1	4–0	2–1	0–0	1–0	6–0	1–1	3–1	3–0	4–0
Betis Deportivo	1–3	—	6–1	2–1	1–2	1–0	0–1	0–2	2–2	3–1	4–0	2–1	2–3	1–0	0–2	0–0	2–0	3–0	1–2	0–0
Ceuta	1–1	1–0	—	0–1	2–0	1–1	1–0	2–2	2–0	1–2	0–0	0–0	1–2	2–0	2–1	2–0	2–1	2–1	2–0	2–1
Córdoba	1–0	2–1	2–0	—	0–0	3–1	1–1	1–1	1–1	3–2	2–0	2–1	1–0	3–1	0–0	2–1	0–0	5–1	2–1	2–1
Estepona	1–3	1–0	3–0	1–0	—	1–1	0–0	0–0	0–0	1–0	0–0	0–0	1–1	0–2	1–0	2–0	0–0	0–0	2–1	2–0
Extremadura	1–2	2–1	0–1	0–2	2–0	—	0–0	1–1	2–0	1–0	1–0	2–1	0–1	0–2	1–1	0–0	0–0	1–0	2–2	1–0
Fuengirola	1–2	1–1	0–0	1–0	0–0	0–0	—	0–0	0–2	2–1	0–0	3–1	0–1	0–1	0–0	0–0	1–0	1–0	1–0	1–0
Granada	0–2	0–0	2–0	2–0	5–2	3–1	3–0	—	1–1	4–2	2–0	1–1	1–0	1–1	0–1	2–0	3–0	1–0	0–0	0–0
Las Palmas Atlético	0–0	4–0	1–1	1–1	0–1	1–1	0–1	0–0	—	0–1	0–0	3–0	1–0	0–0	0–1	3–1	1–5	2–2	0–2	0–2
Linense	0–0	0–1	3–0	0–1	2–0	0–0	0–1	0–0	4–1	—	2–0	0–0	0–0	1–6	0–1	0–1	2–0	0–1	3–1	2–1
Los Boliches	1–1	0–0	0–0	0–2	1–0	2–2	3–1	0–1	1–4	3–0	—	1–0	1–1	1–2	1–1	0–0	1–0	2–0	0–0	0–0
Marino	2–1	2–2	1–1	1–1	0–0	3–0	0–4	1–0	3–2	2–1	2–0	—	1–0	1–1	1–2	2–0	1–2	3–1	0–0	3–0
Melilla	1–0	2–1	1–1	2–1	0–0	1–0	1–1	0–1	0–0	1–3	2–0	3–0	—	0–0	0–2	2–0	1–1	2–0	3–0	2–0
Mérida	1–1	3–0	2–0	2–0	2–2	2–0	0–0	3–2	1–0	1–0	0–1	2–0	1–1	—	1–0	1–0	1–0	3–1	0–0	1–1
Recreativo	0–0	1–2	2–0	1–0	1–1	1–0	5–0	1–1	3–2	0–1	4–1	3–0	2–0	3–2	—	0–1	3–0	2–1	0–0	3–0
Atlético Sanluqueño	1–0	0–0	1–2	1–2	2–0	2–1	1–0	0–0	1–0	4–1	0–0	0–0	0–1	0–0	0–1	—	0–0	0–2	3–0	1–0
Sevilla Atlético	0–2	2–2	1–3	1–3	0–0	0–1	3–0	1–1	1–0	1–1	1–0	1–1	1–1	2–0	0–1	2–3	—	5–2	3–0	0–1
Telde	2–4	2–1	1–0	0–1	0–0	2–1	0–1	0–2	2–1	2–1	2–0	1–0	0–1	1–1	0–1	1–2	2–2	—	3–1	4–2
Toledo	1–3	0–2	3–1	1–0	1–0	1–2	1–0	2–2	0–0	1–1	0–1	1–2	2–1	1–3	0–0	1–0	4–0	0–0	—	2–0
Valdepeñas	0–0	1–1	3–0	0–2	3–0	1–1	1–1	3–2	0–0	0–2	3–3	3–0	0–0	2–1	2–0	2–0	3–1	1–0	1–0	—

Source: BDFútbol
Legend: Blue = home team win; Yellow = draw; Red = away team win.

=== Top goalscorers ===
Goalscorers	Goals	Team
(Spain) Rafael Pozo	22	Badajoz
(Spain) Rodri	16	Badajoz
(Spain) Eduardo Rodríguez	15	Badajoz
(Spain) Carlos Alberto Barrio	15	Mérida
(Spain) Fernando Japón	14	Betis Deportivo

=== Top goalkeepers ===
Goalkeeper	Goals	Matches	Average	Team
(Spain) Salva Navarro	20	33	0.61	Recreativo
(Spain) Rodri	26	36	0.72	Mérida
(Spain) Ignacio Mallo	28	37	0.76	Córdoba
(Spain) José Luis Montes	28	37	0.76	Melilla
(Spain) José Manuel Pariente	29	34	0.85	Estepona

== Group 4 ==
Teams from Balearic Islands, Castilla–La Mancha, Catalonia, Region of Murcia and Valencian Community.

=== Teams ===
Location of teams in Segunda División B Gr. 4 1990–91

Team	Founded	Home city	Stadium
Alcoyano	1928	Alcoy, Valencian Community	El Collao
Alzira	1946	Alzira, Valencian Community	Luis Suñer Picó
Barcelona Atlètic	1970	Barcelona, Catalonia	Mini Estadi
Benidorm	1964	Benidorm, Valencian Community	Foietes
Cartagena FC	1940	Cartagena, Region of Murcia	Cartagonova
Eldense	1921	Elda, Valencian Community	Pepico Amat
Gandía	1947	Gandia, Valencian Community	Guillermo Olagüe
Girona	1930	Girona, Catalonia	Montilivi
Hércules	1922	Alicante, Valencian Community	José Rico Pérez
Hospitalet	1957	L'Hospitalet de Llobregat, Catalonia	Municipal de Deportes
Sporting Mahonés	1974	Mahón, Balearic Islands	Bintaufa
Mallorca Atlético	1967	Palma de Mallorca, Balearic Islands	Lluís Sitjar
Manacor	1923	Manacor, Balearic Islands	Na Capellera
Manlleu	1933	Manlleu, Catalonia	Municipal Manlleu
Olímpic de Xàtiva	1932	Xàtiva, Valencian Community	La Murta
Sant Andreu	1909	Barcelona, Catalonia	Narcís Sala
Tomelloso	1979	Tomelloso, Castilla–La Mancha	Municipal
Torrent	1922	Torrent, Valencian Community	San Gregorio
Torrevieja	1971	Torrevieja, Valencian Community	Vicente García
Yeclano	1950	Yecla, Region of Murcia	Municipal de Deportes

=== League table ===
Pos	Team	Pld	W	D	L	GF	GA	GD	Pts	Qualification or relegation
1	Barcelona Atlètic (P)	38	20	9	9	65	35	+30	49 (Note: Barcelona Atlètic finished ahead of Cartagena and Manlleu on head-to-head goal difference)	Qualification for the promotion playoffs
2	Cartagena	38	18	13	7	48	29	+19	49	Qualification for the promotion playoffs
3	Manlleu	38	18	13	7	55	39	+16	49	Qualification for the promotion playoffs
4	Alcoyano	38	20	8	10	66	39	+27	48 (Note: Alcoyano finished ahead of Hércules on head-to-head points: Hércules–Alcoyano 1–1, Alcoyano–Hércules 4–1)	Qualification for the promotion playoffs
5	Hércules	38	19	10	9	48	29	+19	48	
6	L'Hospitalet	38	16	15	7	61	34	+27	47 (Note: L'Hospitalet finished ahead of Girona on overall goal difference)	
7	Girona	38	16	15	7	47	32	+15	47	
8	Alzira	38	15	12	11	45	37	+8	42	
9	Gandía	38	15	11	12	57	45	+12	41	
10	Benidorm	38	15	10	13	46	35	+11	40	
11	Torrevieja	38	13	11	14	48	46	+2	37 (Note: Torrevieja finished ahead of Sporting Mahonés on overall goal difference)	
12	Sporting Mahonés	38	14	9	15	45	50	−5	37	
13	Sant Andreu	38	12	11	15	43	44	−1	35	
14	Torrent	38	11	12	15	34	50	−16	34	
15	Yeclano	38	13	6	19	55	64	−9	32 (Note: Yeclano finished ahead of Tomelloso on head-to-head points: Tomelloso–Yeclano 0–3, Yeclano–Tomelloso 1–1)	
16	Tomelloso	38	11	10	17	31	44	−13	32	
17	Mallorca Atlético	38	11	8	19	44	60	−16	30	Relegation to Tercera División
18	Eldense	38	7	15	16	34	43	−9	29	Relegation to Tercera División
19	Manacor	38	6	6	26	30	97	−67	18	Relegation to Tercera División
20	Olímpic	38	5	6	27	27	77	−50	16	Relegation to Tercera División

Source: BDFútbol
Rules for classification: 1) points; 2) head-to-head points; 3) head-to-head goal difference; 4) goal difference; 5) number of goals scored
(P) Promoted

=== Results ===
Home \ Away	ALC	ALZ	BAR	BEN	CAR	ELD	GAN	GIR	HER	HOS	MAH	MAL	MNC	MNL	OLI	SAN	TOM	TRN	TRV	YEC
Alcoyano	—	2–2	2–1	2–0	2–0	1–0	3–1	1–1	4–1	0–1	4–0	2–1	7–1	0–1	3–1	1–1	2–0	5–0	1–0	4–1
Alzira	0–2	—	1–0	2–2	1–1	1–0	1–2	2–0	0–4	1–1	0–1	0–0	4–1	1–0	4–1	1–0	2–1	3–0	2–1	1–0
Barcelona Atlètic	4–1	0–0	—	2–1	2–0	1–0	1–0	1–1	1–0	0–1	0–0	3–0	0–0	0–1	6–2	4–2	1–3	1–0	3–0	4–0
Benidorm	1–0	2–1	0–0	—	0–1	4–0	0–2	1–1	0–1	0–0	1–1	3–0	6–0	1–1	2–1	2–0	1–0	1–1	2–1	0–2
Cartagena FC	2–0	0–4	1–1	2–0	—	2–0	2–2	0–0	1–1	0–0	2–1	4–1	3–0	2–0	2–0	0–1	1–0	2–0	3–0	1–2
Eldense	1–0	1–0	0–2	1–2	0–1	—	0–0	0–0	0–1	1–0	1–1	0–0	6–1	2–2	0–0	1–1	1–1	0–2	1–2	1–0
Gandía	0–1	1–0	1–3	1–2	0–0	0–0	—	3–2	3–2	1–2	2–1	0–0	3–1	1–2	3–0	4–0	1–0	2–1	2–0	5–1
Girona	0–0	0–1	4–2	2–0	1–0	2–2	0–1	—	2–1	1–1	2–1	3–2	3–1	2–1	3–1	1–0	3–1	2–0	3–0	1–0
Hércules	1–1	0–0	1–0	1–0	0–3	0–0	1–1	0–0	—	1–1	2–0	1–0	2–0	1–0	1–0	1–0	1–2	0–0	1–2	1–0
Hospitalet	4–0	0–0	1–4	2–4	0–1	0–0	2–2	0–0	2–1	—	3–0	1–1	6–1	3–0	4–0	3–1	0–0	5–2	3–0	2–0
Sporting Mahonés	3–2	2–0	3–1	2–1	1–2	0–0	2–2	1–1	0–3	1–0	—	5–2	3–0	0–0	2–1	0–1	1–1	4–0	1–0	2–1
Mallorca Atlético	0–0	3–0	1–2	1–0	3–0	5–2	3–2	1–1	1–4	1–1	1–2	—	2–0	0–1	2–0	3–1	0–3	2–1	0–5	2–1
Manacor	1–1	0–0	0–2	0–1	1–3	2–1	2–1	0–2	1–3	0–2	0–0	1–0	—	2–2	3–2	3–3	0–1	0–2	2–1	0–6
Manlleu	3–1	2–1	2–2	2–1	2–2	1–0	0–0	1–0	1–1	1–2	2–1	4–0	4–2	—	1–1	1–0	1–0	3–1	1–1	2–0
Olímpic Xàtiva	1–2	1–2	0–1	0–3	1–1	1–2	0–4	0–0	1–0	0–1	2–0	0–0	1–0	1–4	—	0–2	1–2	3–0	0–0	2–1
Sant Andreu	1–1	1–1	4–1	1–0	0–0	1–1	3–0	2–0	0–4	2–2	0–1	1–0	3–0	1–1	5–0	—	1–0	0–1	2–1	1–1
Tomelloso	0–2	1–4	0–3	0–1	0–0	1–1	1–1	0–2	0–1	2–1	2–1	2–1	1–2	0–0	2–1	1–0	—	0–1	1–0	0–3
Torrent	0–1	0–0	1–1	1–1	0–1	2–0	2–2	0–0	1–1	1–0	3–0	2–1	1–0	2–2	2–0	0–0	0–0	—	0–0	2–5
Torrevieja	1–4	1–1	0–0	0–0	1–1	3–2	2–1	1–1	0–1	1–1	2–1	3–2	4–0	4–2	4–0	1–0	1–1	2–0	—	3–0
Yeclano	3–1	3–1	1–5	0–0	1–1	0–7	2–0	3–0	1–2	3–3	3–0	0–2	5–2	0–1	3–1	2–1	1–1	0–2	0–0	—

Source: BDFútbol
Legend: Blue = home team win; Yellow = draw; Red = away team win.

=== Top goalscorers ===
Goalscorers	Goals	Team
(Spain) Juan Gómez	24	Alcoyano
(Spain) Lluís González	22	L'Hospitalet
(Spain) Antonio Pinilla	18	Barcelona Atlètic
(Spain) Falete	14	Torrevieja
(Spain) Mariano Ayneto	13	Gandía

=== Top goalkeepers ===
Goalkeeper	Goals	Matches	Average	Team
(Spain) Florencio Conde	19	28	0.68	L'Hospitalet
(Spain) Luis Raudona	28	38	0.74	Cartagena
(Spain) Josep Maria Soldevila	31	36	0.86	Girona
(Spain) Juan Miguel San Román	29	33	0.88	Benidorm
(Spain) José Francisco Molina	28	29	0.97	Alzira
