= Raúl Gaitán =

Spanish footballer

Personal information
- Full name: Raúl Gaitán Ballesteros
- Date of birth: 10 September 1979 (age 47)
- Place of birth: Málaga, Spain
- Height: 1.75 m (5 ft 9 in)
- Position: Right back

Youth career
- 1995–1997: Málaga

Senior career*
Years	Team	Apps	(Gls)
1997–1998	Málaga B		
1998–1999	Valladolid B		
1999	Los Barrios		
1999–2000	Juventud Torremolinos		
2000–2001	Lucena		
2001–2002	Andalucía		
2002–2003	Toledo	22	(1)
2003–2004	Fuengirola	29	(13)
2004–2005	Alhaurino	32	(0)
2005–2007	Marbella	70	(3)
2007–2008	Málaga	2	(0)
2008–2010	Poli Ejido	59	(4)
2010–2011	Estepona	32	(1)
2011–2015	Jaén	106	(3)
- * Club domestic league appearances and goals

Raúl Gaitán Ballesteros (born 10 September 1979) is a Spanish retired footballer who played as a right back.

== Football career ==
Born in Málaga, Andalusia, Gaitán finished his youth career with local Málaga CF, but played lower league and amateur football until the age of nearly 23, successively representing Atlético Malagueño, Real Valladolid B, UD Los Barrios, Juventud de Torremolinos CF, Lucena CF and Andalucía CF. In the 2002–03 season he first arrived in Segunda División B, signing for CD Toledo.

In summer 2007, after four years with three clubs which included UD Marbella, Gaitán returned to Málaga, with the first team competing in Segunda División. He made his professional debut on 5 September, scoring in a 2–1 home win against Celta de Vigo for the campaign's Copa del Rey; on 17 November he first appeared in the league, netting in his own goal in a 4–2 triumph over Racing de Ferrol also at La Rosaleda Stadium.

Gaitán played in the third level in the following years, with Polideportivo Ejido, Unión Estepona CF and Real Jaén. The 33-year-old helped the latter side achieve promotion at the end of 2012–13, scoring twice in 35 games.
