= Bentley Springer =

Barbadian footballer

Personal information
- Date of birth: 19 November 1979 (age 46)
- Place of birth: Barbados
- Height: 1.82 m (6 ft 0 in)
- Position: Goalkeeper

Team information
- Current team: Weymouth Wales

Senior career*
| Years | Team | Apps | (Gls) |
| 2008–2010 | Technico | | |
| 2011– | Weymouth Wales | | |

International career
| 2008– | Barbados | 4 | (0) |
- * Club domestic league appearances and goals

Bentley Springer (born 19 November 1979) is a Barbadian footballer who currently plays for the Weymouth Wales as a goalkeeper.

== Career ==
He played for the Technico and Weymouth Wales. He made his international debut for Barbados in 2008, and appeared in FIFA World Cup qualifying matches.
