= Alex Matshameko =

Motswana footballer

Personal information
- Full name: Alex Matshameko
- Date of birth: 22 October 1979 (age 47)
- Place of birth: Botswana
- Height: 1.90 m (6 ft 3 in)
- Position: Defender

Senior career*
Years	Team	Apps	(Gls)
2004–	Botswana Meat Commission		

International career
2005	Botswana	2	(0)
- * Club domestic league appearances and goals

Alex Matshameko (born 22 October 1979) is a Motswana former footballer. He played two matches for the Botswana national football team in 2005. Matshameko made a substitute's appearance in a 0–4 2008 Africa Cup of Nations qualifying loss to Mauritania.
