= Neftalí Luna =

Spanish footballer (born 1979)

Neftalí
Personal information
- Full name: Neftalí Suescun Luna
- Date of birth: 14 March 1979 (age 47)
- Place of birth: Córdoba, Spain
- Height: 1.84 m (6 ft 1/2 in)
- Position: Midfielder

Youth career
- Toledo

Senior career*
Years	Team	Apps	(Gls)
1997–2001	Toledo	2	(0)
1999–2000	→ S.S. Reyes (loan)	16	(0)
2001–2005	Levante B		
2005–2006	Sabadell	26	(0)
2006–2007	Alicante	24	(0)
2007–2008	Hospitalet	34	(1)
2008–2009	Conquense	34	(10)
2009–2010	Guijuelo	29	(3)
2010–2011	Peñarroya	?	(4)
Total		165	(18)
- * Club domestic league appearances and goals

Neftalí Suescun Luna (born 14 March 1979 in Córdoba, Andalusia), known simply as Neftalí, is a Spanish retired footballer who played as a central midfielder.
