= Jean-Pascal Biezen =

Dutch footballer (born 1979)

Personal information
- Date of birth: 31 May 1979 (age 47)
- Place of birth: Amsterdam, Netherlands
- Position: Left-back

Senior career*
Years	Team	Apps	(Gls)
1998–2003	Stormvogels Telstar	115	(1)
2003–2004	DOVO		
2004–2005	TOP Oss	8	(0)
2005–2008	DOVO		
- * Club domestic league appearances and goals

Jean-Pascal Biezen (born 31 May 1979) is a Dutch retired footballer who played as a left-back.

== Club career ==
He played for Eerste Divisie clubs Stormvogels Telstar and FC Oss during the 1998-2005 football seasons. In September 2001 Biezen was taken to hospital with a brain injury after being involved in a car accident alongside fellow Telstar players Orlando Smeekes, Germaine Levant and Melvin Holwijn.

Biezen retired from playing in 2008 at DOVO, whom he had joined in 2003 and again in 2005 after another stint in professional football with TOP Oss.
