= Thierry Bayock =

Cameroonian footballer (born 1979)

Personal information
- Date of birth: 27 August 1979 (age 47)
- Place of birth: Yaounde, Cameroon
- Height: 1.71 m (5 ft 7 1/2 in)
- Position: Midfielder

Team information
- Current team: stopped in 2017

Senior career*
Years	Team	Apps	(Gls)
1999–2004	Alemannia Aachen	63	(7)
2005	Visé		
2005–2006	OH Leuven	26	(1)
2006–2008	Tienen	40	(8)
2008–2009	Seraing RUL		
2009–2010	Dessel Sport		
2010–2012	RFC Tilleur-Saint-Gilles		
2012–2013	Montegnée		
2013–2016	Cointe-Liège		
2016–2017	Banneux		
- * Club domestic league appearances and goals

Thierry Bayock (born 27 August 1979) is a Cameroonian footballer. He plays in the right offensive midfield for Banneux in the Belgian Provincial Leagues.

Bayock previously played for Alemannia Aachen, RCS Visé, Oud-Heverlee Leuven, K.V.K. Tienen, Seraing, and KFC Dessel Sport.
