= Technico (Barbados football club) =

Barbados football club

- Full name: Technico
- Ground: Speightstown, Saint Peter, Barbados
- League: Barbados First Division
- 2008: 7th
Home colours

Technico is a Barbados football club, based in Black Bess, near Speightstown in the northern parish of Saint Peter.

They play in the Barbados' third division, the Barbados Second Division.

== Achievements ==
None.
