= Hans Rohde =

German footballer

Personal information
- Date of birth: 12 July 1912
- Date of death: 3 December 1979 (aged 67)

Senior career*
Years	Team	Apps	(Gls)
- Eimsbütteler TV

International career
1936-1942	Germany	25	
- * Club domestic league appearances and goals

Hans "Bubi" Rohde (7 December 1914 – 3 December 1979) was a German footballer.

The defender and midfielder earned 25 caps for Germany from 1936 to 1942. His team was Eimsbütteler TV of Hamburg.
