= Michael Brunswijk =

Dutch footballer

Personal information
- Date of birth: May 2, 1979 (age 47)
- Place of birth: Rotterdam, Netherlands
- Position: Defender

Senior career*
Years	Team	Apps	(Gls)
2000–2001	RKC	0	(0)
2001–2003	TOP Oss	38	(1)
- * Club domestic league appearances and goals

Michael Brunswijk (born 2 May 1979) is a Dutch former footballer who played for Eerste Divisie club FC Oss during the 2001–03 football seasons.

== Club career ==
Brunswijk played amateur football for clubs such as Alexandria '66, DCV, Leonidas, TONEGIDO, Delta Sport and DHC. He was also on the books of professional sides Excelsior and RKC.

== Personal life ==
Brunswijk is the nephew of former Real Madrid and Netherlands international Royston Drenthe.
