= Judith Sarmiento =

Colombian lawyer and journalist

- Born: Judith Sarmiento Granada; 20 January 1954 (age 72); Armenia, Colombia
- Education: Universidad Externado de Colombia
- Occupations: Lawyer, journalist, teacher
- Awards: Simón Bolívar Television Award (1990); India Catalina Award (2001)

Judith Sarmiento Granada (born 20 January 1954) is a Colombian lawyer and journalist known nationally for her work in various radio and television media since the 1970s.

== Biography ==
Judith Sarmiento was born in Armenia, Colombia, on 20 January 1954, the daughter of Gilberto Sarmiento and Ofelia Granada.

Her education took place in Bogotá, at the La Merced school, at the Universidad Externado de Colombia – where she majored in law and political science – and at the University of La Sabana, where she specialized in organizational communication.

She has one daughter and a grandson. Her favorite author is José María Vargas Vila.

== Professional career ==
=== Radio ===
Sarmiento began her career in radio on the Todelar network in 1975. She later worked at Caracol, RCN, and Radio Nacional de Colombia, among others.

=== Television ===
In 1980, Sarmiento began working in television on Arturo Abella's Telediario. She then appeared on the National News, on TV Hoy, and as moderator of several broadcasts, such as teleconferences of the Office of the Inspector General, of the Higher School of Public Administration, and viewer's ombudsman of Canal Capital.

=== Teaching ===
Sarmiento has been a teacher of journalism, organizational communication, and radio planning at the Externado, Military, and Politécnico Grancolombiano universities. She also authored the United Nations Development Programme's course "Democracy and Media in the Virtual Course".

== Awards and recognitions ==
- Simón Bolívar Television Award for best TV news anchor (1990)
- India Catalina Award (2001)
- Gloria Valencia de Castaño Award for Best News Announcer from the Colombian Association of Broadcasters (2016)
- Golden Walnut Award from Corporación Universitaria Unitec (2011)
