= Marek Klimczok =

Polish footballer

Personal information
- Date of birth: 25 May 1979 (age 47)
- Place of birth: Katowice, Poland
- Height: 1.84 m (6 ft 0 in)
- Position: Midfielder

Youth career
- Stadion Śląski Chorzów

Senior career*
Years	Team	Apps	(Gls)
–2000	Olimpia Piekary Śląskie		
2000–2005	Eintracht Nordhorn	158	(17)
2005–2007	BV Cloppenburg	67	(16)
2007–2008	Fortuna Düsseldorf	6	(0)
2008–2011	1. FC Kleve	81	(17)
2011–2021	SV Schermbeck	222	(35)
- * Club domestic league appearances and goals

Marek Klimczok (born 25 May 1979) is a Polish former professional footballer who played as a midfielder.

== Career ==
Klimczok was born in Katowice. He signed on with Eintracht Nordhorn as his first German team before moving to BV Cloppenburg in 2005. He subsequently joined Fortuna Düsseldorf, 1. FC Kleve, and, in 2011, SV Schermbeck. Klimczok signed for another season with SV Schermbeck in 2020. In 2021, he was among the oldest footballers in Oberliga Westfalen and was considering retirement. By the summer, he left Schermbeck.
