= Sarmiento =

Sarmiento may refer to:

== Places ==
=== Argentina ===
- Sarmiento Department, San Juan, a subdivision of the San Juan Province
- Sarmiento Department, Santiago del Estero, a subdivision of the Santiago del Estero Province
- Sarmiento Department, Chubut, a subdivision of the Chubut Province
- Sarmiento, Chubut, a city in Chubut Province
- Sarmiento, Santa Fe, a town in Santa Fe Province

=== Chile ===
- Cordillera Sarmiento, a mountain range in Chilean Patagonia
- Monte Sarmiento, a mountain in Tierra del Fuego
- Sarmiento Channel, a channel in the Chilean Archipelago
- Sarmiento Lake, a lake in the Torres del Paine National Park, southern Chile

== Sports ==
- Club Atlético Sarmiento, a football club in Junín, Argentina
- Sarmiento de Resistencia, a football club in Resistencia, Argentina

== Other uses ==
- Sarmiento (surname)
- ARA Presidente Sarmiento, a former naval training ship from Argentina
- Ferrocarril Domingo Faustino Sarmiento, a railway line in Argentina
