= Dadash Kazikhanov =

Russian footballer

Personal information
- Full name: Dadash Kazikhanovich Kazikhanov
- Date of birth: 15 September 1979 (age 47)
- Height: 1.72 m (5 ft 8 in)
- Positions: Defender; midfielder

Senior career*
Years	Team	Apps	(Gls)
1997	FC Mozdok	41	(0)
1999–2000	FC KAMAZ-Chally Naberezhnye Chelny	16	(0)
2000	FC Spartak Yoshkar-Ola	14	(2)
2001–2002	FC Avtodor Vladikavkaz	62	(4)
2003	FC Dynamo Bryansk	29	(0)
2004	FC Zvezda Irkutsk	26	(3)
2005–2011	FC SKA-Energiya Khabarovsk	149	(0)
2010–2011	→ FC Dynamo Barnaul (loan)	35	(0)
- * Club domestic league appearances and goals

Dadash Kazikhanovich Kazikhanov (Russian: Дадаш Казиханович Казиханов; born 15 September 1979) is a former Russian professional football player.

== Club career ==
He played 5 seasons in the Russian Football National League for FC SKA-Energiya Khabarovsk.
