= Dida (footballer, born 1979) =

Brazilian footballer

Personal information
- Full name: Eduardo Gabriel dos Santos Filho
- Date of birth: February 4, 1979 (age 47)
- Place of birth: Palmeira dos Índios, Brazil
- Height: 1.71 m (5 ft 7 in)
- Position: Right-back

Youth career
- 1993–1994: CSA
- 1994–1996: Flamengo

Senior career*
Years	Team	Apps	(Gls)
1997–1999	Flamengo		
2000	América-SP		
2001–2004	Brasiliense		
2005	Atlético Goianiense		
2006	Botafogo		
2007	Atlético Goianiense		
2008	Itumbiara		
2009	Santa Helena		
2010	Atlético Goianiense		
2011	Botafogo (SP)		
2011	Itumbiara		
2011	CRAC		
2011	Remo		
2013	Paragominas		
2014–2015	CSE		
- * Club domestic league appearances and goals

Eduardo Gabriel dos Santos Filho, better known as Dida (born February 4, 1979) is Brazilian former professional footballer who played as a right-back.

== Career ==
Did was born in Palmeira dos Índios. He was formed in the basic categories of Flamengo where he was still known as Eduardo. He played for Flamengo until 1999.

After leaving the red and black, was to defend the América-SP, in 2000, arriving the year after Brasiliense, which came to be called only by Dida.

In 2004, the Brazilian played for Guarani, returning in 2005 to the alligator to be cast that would be demoted to Serie B.

He played for Atlético Goianiense and the series B by América de Natal.

In 2009, the league Dida played at Santa Helena, Goiás.

In 2010, Dida returned to Atlético Goianiense, and plays with the number 13 shirt.
