= Tomás Jiménez =

Spanish footballer

Personal information
- Full name: Tomás Jiménez Álvarez
- Date of birth: 11 May 1979 (age 47)
- Place of birth: Salamanca, Spain
- Height: 1.86 m (6 ft 1 in)
- Position: Left back

Youth career
- Robert de Salamanca
- Salamanca

Senior career*
Years	Team	Apps	(Gls)
1996–1999	Salamanca B		
1998–2008	Salamanca	211	(5)
2008–2009	Zamora	28	(2)
2009–2012	Cacereño	77	(2)
2013	Villanovense	13	(0)
2013–2014	Guijuelo	14	(0)
Total		339	(9)
- * Club domestic league appearances and goals

Tomas Jiménez Álvarez (born 11 May 1979), is a Spanish former footballer who played as a left defender.

== Club career ==
Born in Salamanca, Region of León, Tomás finished his graduation with local UD Salamanca's youth setup, and made his senior debuts with the reserves in the Tercera División. On 20 September 1998 he appeared in his first game with the main squad, playing the last four minutes of a 3–1 La Liga home win against Deportivo de La Coruña, and he scored his first official goal roughly three years later, but in a 2–4 away loss to Córdoba CF in the Segunda División.

Tomás left Salamanca in 2008, and went on to resume his career in Segunda División B, representing Zamora CF, CP Cacereño, CF Villanovense and CD Guijuelo.
