= Denis Fladung =

Russian footballer

Personal information
- Full name: Denis Yuryevich Fladung
- Date of birth: 20 February 1979 (age 47)
- Height: 1.80 m (5 ft 11 in)
- Positions: Midfielder; forward

Senior career*
Years	Team	Apps	(Gls)
1997–2000	FC UralAZ Miass	55	(5)
2002–2005	FC Spartak Chelyabinsk	120	(12)
2006	FC Zvezda Irkutsk	35	(11)
2007	FC Metallurg Lipetsk	25	(2)
2008	FC Amur Blagoveshchensk	11	(4)
2009	FC Amur Blagoveshchensk	4	(0)
2009	FC Torpedo Miass (D4)		
2010	FC Chelyabinsk	24	(0)
- * Club domestic league appearances and goals

Denis Yuryevich Fladung (Russian: Денис Юрьевич Фладунг; born 20 February 1979) is a former Russian professional football player.

== Club career ==
He played in the Russian Football National League for FC Spartak Chelyabinsk in 2005.
