= Simone Berardi =

Italian footballer

Personal information
- Full name: Simone Berardi
- Date of birth: 30 October 1979 (age 47)
- Place of birth: Rome, Italy
- Height: 1.69 m (5 ft 7 in)
- Position: Midfielder

Senior career*
Years	Team	Apps	(Gls)
1998–1999	Pergocrema	20	(0)
1999–2000	Pro Vasto	29	(2)
2000–2002	Nardò	51	(0)
2002–2008	San Marino Calcio	160	(0)
2008–2009	Paganese	29	(0)
2009–2010	Potenza	31	(1)
2010–2012	Latina	54	(3)
- * Club domestic league appearances and goals

Simone Berardi (born 30 October 1979 in Rome) is an Italian former footballer who played as a midfielder. He appeared in the third and fourth tiers of football in Italy.

== See also ==
- List of football clubs in Italy
