= Filadelfo Sánchez Sarmiento =

Mexican radio journalist and murder victim

- Born: ca. 1970; Miahuatlán de Porfirio Díaz, Oaxaca, Mexico
- Died: July 2, 2015; Miahuatlan de Porfirio Diaz, Oaxaca, Mexico
- Cause of death: killed by five to seven bullets
- Occupation: Journalist
- Years active: began career in 2010; killed in 2015
- Employer: La Favorita 103.3
- Known for: criticism of authority, director of La Favorita
- Title: Director
- Relatives: Oaxaca journalist Misael Sanchez of the newspaper El Tiempo is Filadelfo Sanchez Sarmiento's sister.
- Awards: Sarmiento was regarded as one of the most influential radio broadcasters in the Southern Sierra of Oaxaca.

Filadelfo Sánchez Sarmiento (c. 1970 – 2 July 2015) was a Mexican radio journalist and director for La Favorita 103.3 FM radio station in Miahuatlán de Porfirio Díaz, Oaxaca, Mexico. He was specifically targeted and fatally shot 5–7 times by two gunmen during a time of political discontent. The murder occurred around 9:30 am when Sarmiento walked from the local station after just finishing his morning news broadcast.

== Personal ==
Among the last stories covered by Sarmiento was an accusation against a local Institutional Revolutionary Party candidate running for federal deputy who was seen accompanied in his political campaign by people using firearms reserved for the use of the Armed Forces. Oscar Valencia, the candidate, went on to win the election. Sarmiento did not have a wife or any children, but his brother is another Oaxaca journalist, Misael Sánchez, of the newspaper El Tiempo. "I was at the radio station, put on the music and was considering scheduling, when I heard the detonations of firearm in the door," said Guadalupe, who for five years accompanied Sarmiento in the project to install the station radio. The two subjects who completed the crime ran into the streets, one by Benito Juarez and the other by Porfirio Díaz. The funeral was held on July 3, 2015.

== Career ==
Filadelfo Sánchez Sarmiento was a radio journalist and director for La Favorita 103.3 radio station. Sarmiento also wrote for local newspapers, including El Tiempo. La Favorita regularly received death threats toward Sarmiento on account of his criticism of public officials and his political stances. One local journalist, who asked not to be identified for fear of reprisal, told CPJ that Sánchez had written reports criticizing local authorities' failure to implement adequate garbage pickup and to complete public works projects. Sarmiento had received death threats for some time, including at the office, by telephone or on Facebook and WhatsApp, but they had become more frequent recently, according to Imparcial Oaxaca. The newspaper reported that the journalist told his coworkers, "I'm afraid, be careful, they say they will bring me down." According to The Yucatán Times, Mexico is one of the world's most dangerous countries for journalists, and deaths like Sarmiento's are notorious in the southern state of Veracruz. La Favorita celebrated its fifth anniversary of being on air just two months before the death of Sarmiento.

== Death ==
Oaxaca is in Mexico and shown relative to the capital Mexico City.

Filadelfo Sánchez Sarmiento was leaving the radio station La Favorita 103.3 when he was specifically targeted and fatally shot 5-7 times by two gang gunmen driving an unidentified vehicle on July 2, 2015, at 9 a.m. Sarmiento was killed as he moved down the street Margarita Maza de Juarez, in the district of San Francisco Municipal Railway fleet in the municipality of Miahuatlán de Porfirio Díaz. He was shot after receiving daily death threats on account of his journalistic criticism. Sarmiento died instantly after being shot. After four hours of diligence, the remains were taken to the amphitheater of the Institute of Forensic Services for the purpose of law that an autopsy. During the review carried out at the site, they confirmed he had been shot four times, two of which entered the head. The bullets were confirmed to be 9mm casings.

== Context ==
At least four journalists were killed in connection to their work in South America in 2015. The largest number of attacks in 2015 took place in the states of Veracruz and Oaxaca, the same state Sarmiento was killed in. Journalist Kidnapping and murder of Moisés Sánchez Cerezo was kidnapped in Veracruz in January and found decapitated and dismembered several weeks later. Sánchez was the founder and director of the newspaper La Unión; the paper regularly criticized authorities for their failure to respond to local criminal activity, prompting death threats from the mayor of the town of Medellín. In July, Veracruz Activist and journalist Rubén Espinosa, who had reported receiving numerous threats, was killed at an apartment in Mexico City. In Oaxaca, Mexico Armando Saldaña Morales and Filadelfo Sánchez Sarmiento were murdered in May and July, respectively. Sarmiento was known for coverage of local corruption, while Saldaña antagonized criminal gangs with his reporting. In a crime not included in Committee to Protect Journalists tally, a community radio director in Oaxaca, Abel Bautista Raymundo, was killed in April, illustrating the frequent harassment and lack of protection for journalists in this sector. Miahuatlan was one of several locations in Oaxaca where election protests were mounted by members of the Coordinadora Nacional de Trabajadores de la Educación, in which election materials were destroyed and political party offices attacked. The Director-General of UNESCO Irina Bokova urged the Mexican authorities to shed light on the killing of three journalists Filadelfo Sánchez Sarmiento, Gerardo Nieto Alvarez and Juan Mendoza Delgado, who died between 26 June and 2 July. More than 80 media workers have been killed and another 17 reported missing in the past decade, according to Reporters Without Borders.

== Impact ==
Sarmiento's death, coupled with the other horrendous deaths of fellow journalists in the same year, city officials were required to begin admitting the links between the deaths of these individuals and their profession due to Media rights groups demanding authorities investigate the deaths of three journalists in Mexico during the same week Sarmiento was killed. The U.S.-based Committee to Protect Journalists condemned the killing. It said that Sanchez Sarmiento hosted La Favorita and had written for local newspapers, including El Tiempo. He had received threatening phone calls. "We call on the Oaxaca, Veracruz and Guanajuato authorities to ensure that impartial, independent and thorough investigations are carried out and that those responsible for these despicable crimes are arrested," Reporters Without Borders program director Lucie Morillon said. According to Freedom House, Low levels of funding and political will, bureaucratic rivalries, and lack of training are among the challenges that affect the federal government's ability to protect journalists. Journalists and human rights defenders who sought risk assessment and protection measures reportedly faced delays and inadequate safeguards, although some did benefit from the program during 2015, and the backlog of cases has been reduced. Nonetheless, ongoing problems were highlighted in an independent study conducted in 2015 by Espacio OSC, a coalition of civil society organizations.

== Reactions ==
Oaxaca Gov. Gabino Cué Monteagudo called on state prosecutor Joaquín Ruiz-Giménez to conduct a diligent investigation to solve the crime and arrest those responsible. Public officials were accused of often disregarded apparent links between such crimes and the victims' status as journalists. They were accused of refusing to admit Sarmiento's death had anything to do with his connection to the media. In the past, Veracruz authorities said José Sánchez was a taxi driver rather than a journalist, and the federal attorney general's office were accused of using this justification for nonintervention in the case. Mexico City officials were similarly quick to blame Espinosa's death on his supposed presence at a party that featured prostitutes and drug use. As of year's end, at least one suspect had been arrested in the Saldaña case; in the Espinosa case, several arrests were made, but Press freedom advocates assailed the investigation for failing to clarify numerous outstanding questions about the incident. According to the Committee to Protect Journalists, despite increased international attention to the murders of journalists, governments fail to take action to reduce the high rates of targeted violence and impunity.

== See also ==
- List of journalists and media workers killed in Mexico
