= Christoph Spatzenegger =

Austrian footballer

Personal information
- Full name: Christoph Spatzenegger
- Date of birth: 3 April 1979 (age 47)
- Place of birth: Austria
- Height: 1.88 m (6 ft 2 in)
- Position: Defender

Team information
- Current team: TSV Neumarkt II

Youth career
- 1989–1990: FC Bergheim
- 1990–1991: SV Hallwang
- 1991–1993: SV Seekirchen
- 1993–1997: SV Austria Salzburg

Senior career*
Years	Team	Apps	(Gls)
1997–1998	SV Grödig		
1998–1999	SV Braunau	15	(0)
1999–2002	SV Austria Salzburg Amateure		
2002	SV Austria Salzburg	1	(0)
2002–2004	FC Puch		
2004–2005	LASK Linz	2	(0)
2005	SK Altheim		
2005–2012	SV Seekirchen	107	(6)
2012–2014	Union Henndorf	49	(1)
2014–	TSV Neumarkt	1	(0)
- * Club domestic league appearances and goals as of 23 October 2015

Christoph Spatzenegger (born 3 April 1979) is an Austrian footballer who currently plays for the TSV Neumarkt.
