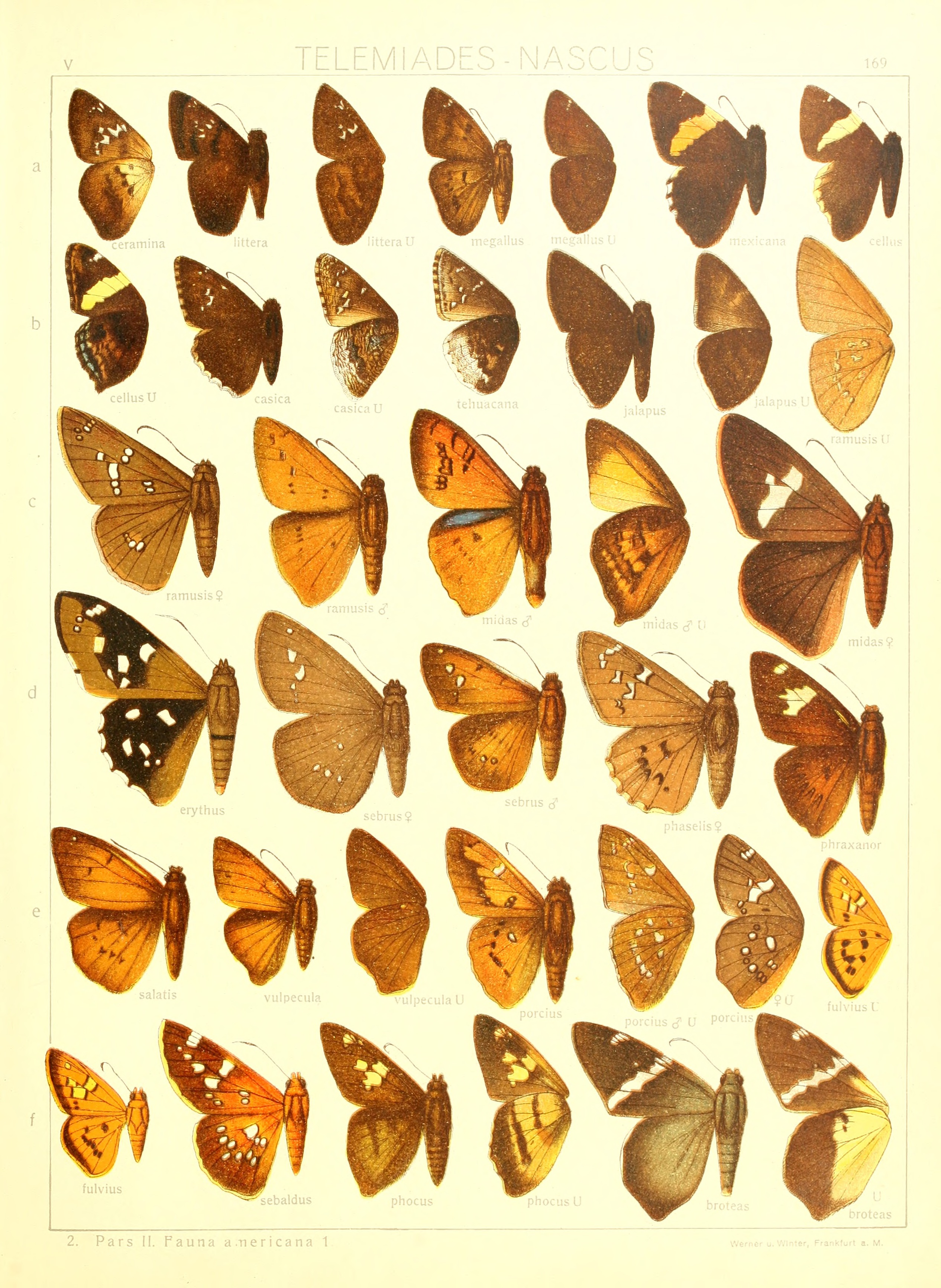
- Sarmientola and related genera in Adalbert Seitz's Macrolepidoptera of the World Vol.5 The American Rhopalocera

Scientific classification
- Kingdom: Animalia
- Phylum: Arthropoda
- Clade: Pancrustacea
- Class: Insecta
- Order: Lepidoptera
- Family: Hesperiidae
- Genus: Sarmientola; Berg, 1897

Synonyms
- Sarmientoia

= Sarmientola =

Genus of butterflies

Sarmientola is a Neotropical genus of skippers in the subfamily Eudaminae.

== Species ==
- Sarmientola almeidai (Mielke, 1967)
- Sarmientola browni (Mielke, 1967)
- Sarmientola dinka (Evans, 1952)
- Sarmientola eriopis (Hewitson, 1867)
- Sarmientola faustinus (Burmeister, 1878)
- Sarmientola haywardi (Mielke, 1967)
- Sarmientola phaselis (Hewitson, 1867)
- Sarmientola similis (Mielke, 1967)
