= 1991 Segunda División B play-offs =

Spanish football league play-offs

The 1991 Segunda División B play-offs were the final playoffs for the promotion from 1990–91 Segunda División B to 1991–92 Segunda División. The first four teams in each group took part in the play-off. The teams played a league of four teams, divided into 4 groups. The champion of each group promoted to Segunda División.

== Group A ==
Pos	Team	Pld	W	D	L	GF	GA	GD	Pts	Qualification or relegation
1	Mérida	6	5	0	1	10	4	+6	10	Promotion to Segunda División
2	Barcelona Atlètic (Note: Barcelona Atlètic promoted to Segunda División after Orihuela relegation due to financial problems)	6	4	1	1	14	3	+11	9	
3	Osasuna Promesas	6	1	1	4	2	12	−10	3	
4	Lugo	6	0	2	4	2	9	−7	2	

Source: BDFútbol
Rules for classification: 1) points; 2) head-to-head points; 3) head-to-head goal difference; 4) goal difference; 5) number of goals scored

=== Results ===
Home \ Away	FCB	LUG	MER	OSA
Barcelona Atlètic	—	0–0	2–1	4–0
Lugo	0–3	—	0–1	1–1
Mérida	2–1	3–1	—	2–0
Osasuna Promesas	0–4	1–0	0–1	—

Source: BDFútbol
Legend: Blue = home team win; Yellow = draw; Red = away team win.

== Group B ==
Pos	Team	Pld	W	D	L	GF	GA	GD	Pts	Qualification or relegation
1	Real Madrid Deportivo	6	3	2	1	7	4	+3	8	Promotion to Segunda División
2	Recreativo	6	2	2	2	10	8	+2	6 (Note: Recreativo finished ahead of Manlleu on head-to-head goal difference: Manlleu–Recreativo 2–1, Recreativo–Manlleu 5–2)	
3	Manlleu	6	2	2	2	10	11	−1	6	
4	San Sebastián	6	1	2	3	5	9	−4	4	

Source: BDFútbol
Rules for classification: 1) points; 2) head-to-head points; 3) head-to-head goal difference; 4) goal difference; 5) number of goals scored

=== Results ===
Home \ Away	MAN	RMC	REC	RSO
Manlleu	—	1–1	2–1	3–1
Real Madrid Deportivo	2–1	—	0–0	0–1
Recreativo	5–2	1–2	—	1–0
San Sebastián	1–1	0–2	2–2	—

Source: BDFútbol
Legend: Blue = home team win; Yellow = draw; Red = away team win.

== Group C ==
Pos	Team	Pld	W	D	L	GF	GA	GD	Pts	Qualification or relegation
1	Compostela	6	4	1	1	9	7	+2	9	Promotion to Segunda División
2	Badajoz	6	3	2	1	14	6	+8	8	
3	Alcoyano	6	1	2	3	8	9	−1	4	
4	Alavés	6	1	1	4	6	15	−9	3	

Source: BDFútbol
Rules for classification: 1) points; 2) head-to-head points; 3) head-to-head goal difference; 4) goal difference; 5) number of goals scored

=== Results ===
Home \ Away	ALA	ALC	BAD	COM
Alavés	—	3–1	1–1	1–2
Alcoyano	4–1	—	1–1	1–2
Badajoz	5–0	2–1	—	4–0
Compostela	2–0	0–0	3–1	—

Source: BDFútbol
Legend: Blue = home team win; Yellow = draw; Red = away team win.

== Group D ==
Pos	Team	Pld	W	D	L	GF	GA	GD	Pts	Qualification or relegation
1	Racing Santander	6	2	4	0	14	9	+5	8 (Note: Racing Santander finished ahead of Cartagena on overall goal difference)	Promotion to Segunda División
2	Cartagena	6	2	4	0	6	2	+4	8	
3	Getafe	6	1	4	1	6	6	0	6	
4	Córdoba	6	0	2	4	4	13	−9	2	

Source: BDFútbol
Rules for classification: 1) points; 2) head-to-head points; 3) head-to-head goal difference; 4) goal difference; 5) number of goals scored

=== Results ===
Home \ Away	CAR	COR	GET	RAC
Cartagena	—	1–0	0–0	1–1
Córdoba	0–3	—	1–1	3–3
Getafe	0–0	1–0	—	3–4
Racing Santander	1–1	4–0	1–1	—

Source: BDFútbol
Legend: Blue = home team win; Yellow = draw; Red = away team win.
