= Stephano Wooding =

Dutch footballer

Personal information
- Date of birth: 26 December 1979 (age 46)
- Place of birth: Eindhoven, Netherlands
- Position: Left back

Youth career
- –1995: SV Lelystad '67
- 1995–1999: SC Heerenveen

Senior career*
Years	Team	Apps	(Gls)
1999–2001	SC Heerenveen	0	(0)
1999	→ KuPS (loan)	16	(0)
2001–2004	Heracles Almelo	54	(1)
2004–2005	DOVO		
- * Club domestic league appearances and goals

Stephano Wooding (born 26 December 1979) is a Dutch former professional footballer who played as a left back.

== Career ==
Wooding started playing in youth department of SV Lelystad '67. After impressing as a defender, he moved to the youth academy of SC Heerenveen. However, he did not manage to break through to the first team and was sent on loan to Finnish club KuPS for one season. The following season, he was a bench player at Heerenveen and in 2001 he signed a contract with Heracles Almelo. On 18 August 2001, he made his league debut against TOP Oss in the Eerste Divisie. After three seasons with Heracles, his professional career came to an end and he played another season as on an amateur deal with DOVO.

== Honours ==
Heracles Almelo

- Eerste Divisie: 2004–05
