= Mira Gojak =

Australian sculptor (born 1963)

Mira Gojak is an Australian artist who was born in Adelaide in 1963 and now works in Melbourne. Her sculptures are like linear drawings in space, tracing the forces of gravity and suspension that we can feel. They create a sense of inside and outside space. Gojak is also known for her drawings. She has been awarded several times and has exhibited widely in Australia as well as Hong Kong.

== Biography and education ==
In Adelaide, Gojak's immigrant parents were active in the Catholic Slovenian and Croatian community. Mira has said that she felt she grew up in two different cultural and social worlds. Her mother wanted her to be a doctor, and Mira achieved First Class Honours and a Bachelor of Science in Zoology and animal behaviour Psychology, but Mira found during practical work that she was not happy in the world of zoology. She began to think that art would give her freedom so she went to Melbourne to study Art.

In 1989, she finished an advanced Certificate in Art and Design at Prahran TAFE, Melbourne. In 1990, she matriculated at the Victorian College of the Arts, Melbourne, where she graduated in 1992 with a Bachelor of Fine Arts (Painting). From 2014, she began work on a PhD at Monash University in Caufield, Victoria Her skills have been recognized by grants, prizes and residencies. In 2004, she received an Arts Victoria Art Development Grant for $10,000. From 2004 to 2006, Mira was a studio artist at the Gertrude Street Contemporary Art Spaces in Melbourne. In 2011, she received an Arts Victoria Grant for $12,500 and in 2014, she received another Grant for an exhibition as a Studio Artist at Gertrude Street Contemporary Art Spaces.

In 2005, she won the Maddock's Art Prize, from the Australia Council for the Arts. This prize is granted every two years go emerging artists, and is sponsored by the Maddock law firm.

In 2012, her work was included in 101 Contemporary Australian Artists, published by the National Gallery of Victoria.

In 2014, Mira spent several months in Barcelona, where she photographed the sky enclosed by her studio window and crisscrossed with aeroplane vapour trails. The photographs became the seeds for the series of blue yarn works she exhibited in 2016.

== Works ==
Her sculptures, which often include colour, are like her drawings on paper that are only in black-and-white. Mira admits that if she finds herself tiring on one medium, she begins to work on the other.

Her works are very linear in both drawing and sculpture. When asked what attributes of line were important, she replied:

"Fluidity and movement, the ability to scramble fixed boundaries, by eradicating boundaries or making them permeable or resetting and clarifying the boundary itself."

She has also used yarn and wound it to create a mass of line, suggesting a line of great distance, that is wrapped around parts of linear sculptures.

Images of her works shown in 2018 can be seen at https://buxtoncontemporary.com/exhibitions/the-garden-of-forking-paths-mira-gojak-and-takehito-koganezawa/

== Exhibitions ==
Solo exhibitions
2018	The Garden of Forking Paths, Buxton Contemporary, Melbourne
2016	Distant Measures, Margaret Lawrence Gallery, Melbourne
2015	Erased blue, brackets and arrows, Murray White Room, Melbourne
2011	Transfer stations, Murray White Room, Melbourne
2010	Mira Gojak. Presented by Monash University Museum of Art, Curated by Kirrily Hammond, Switchback Gallery, Gippsland Centre for Art & Design, Monash University
2009	Another ground, Murray White Room, Melbourne
2007	Cave, Block Projects, Block Place, Melbourne
2006	Too Near, Too Far, Monash University Museum of Art presentation at the Melbourne Art Fair, Melbourne
2005	Time and Time Again, CLUBS Project Inc, Melbourne
2004	Stranded, Studio 12, Gertrude Contemporary Art Spaces, Melbourne
2004	Stranded, Canberra Contemporary Art Space, ACT
2002	Wax me to the vapour and dusk, sometimes. Gertrude Contemporary Art Spaces, Melbourne
2002	Sorrow is no friend of mine, First Floor, Melbourne
2000	Encounter, First Floor, Melbourne
1998	Between the Street Lights & the Dark Trees, First Floor, Melbourne
Selected group exhibitions
2019	The National 2019, Art Gallery of New South Wales, Sydney
2018	Murray White Room, Melbourne Art Fair, Melbourne
2017	Future Eaters, MUMA, Monash University, Melbourne Murray White Room, Spring1883, Sydney
2015	Murray White Room, Art Basel Hong Kong 2015
2014	The Piranesi Effect, Ian Potter Museum of Art, University of Melbourne
2014	Different Strokes, Casula Powerhouse Arts Centre, NSW
2013	Melbourne Now, National Gallery of Victoria, Melbourne Murray White Room, Sydney Contemporary 13, Sydney Burying Time, Breenspace, Sydney
2010	Freehand: Recent Australian drawing, Heide Museum of Modern Art, Melbourne Contemporary Encounters: A selection of works from the Victorian Foundation for Living Australian Artists, National Gallery of Victoria, Melbourne CHANGE, an inaugural MUMA Caulfield exhibition, Monash University Museum of Art, Caulfield Campus, Monash University There’s no time: John Spiteri, Mira Gojak, Bradd Westmoreland, KarlWiebke, The Ian Potter Museum of Art, University of Melbourne
2009	Building a Collection, National Gallery of Victoria International, Melbourne GROUP 02, Murray White Room, Melbourne PREVIEW 09, Murray White Room, Melbourne
2007	A Selection of Recent Acquisitions, Monash University Museum of Art, Melbourne Materiality, Curated by Kirrily Hammond, Monash University Museum of Art at Gippsland Centre for Art & Design Line between night and day, Collaboration with musicians and composer for Musicircus, Melbourne Festival A Bridge Too Far, Curated by Jacqueline Doughty, Alliance Francaise, Melbourne Too Near, too far, Melbourne-Milan artist exchange, Curated by Chiara Agnello & Roberta Tenconi, Milan, Italy
2006	Before the Body-Matter, Curated by Geraldine Barlow, Monash University Museum of Art, Melbourne
2005	Fellow Anthropoid, Curated by Philip Watkins, Contemporary Art Services Tasmania (CAST), Hobart Nothing before, nothing after, with Alexander Pittendrigh, RMIT Project Space & Spare Room Gallery, Melbourne Pitch Your Own Tent / Art Projects/ Store 5/ 1st Floor, Curated by Max Delany, Monash University Museum of Art, Melbourne NEW05, Curated by Max Delany with Mutlu Cerkez, Destiny Deacon, James Lynch, Stuart Ringholt, Kathy Temin, ACCA, Australian Centre for Contemporary Art, Melbourne
2004	The Blindside Effect, Curated by Christine Morrow with David Atkenson, PJ Hickman and Asim Memishi, Blindside, Nicholas Building, Melbourne Southern: A Show Of 10 Australian Artists, Curated by Nicole Tomlinson & Kristi Monfries with David Rozetsky, David Noonan, Sean Meilak, Andrea Tu, Richard Butler-Bowden, Kirsten Berg & Paul Sloan. Home Gallery, Prague
2002	Why do birds suddenly appear, Curated by Clare Firth-Smith with Kate Daw, Andrew McQualter, James Lynch, Nick Managan, Boutwell Draper Gallery, Sydney New drawings, Curated by Mark Misic with Alex Pittendrigh, Louise Paramour, Louise Forthum, Lisa Young, Mass Gallery, Melbourne
2000	USEby Asia Pacific Artist Initiatives Project, Curated by Tessa Dwyer & Sarah Tutton, Centre for Contemporary Photography, Melbourne
1999	Nearest Habitat System. Curated by Eliza Hutchinson, with Alex Knox, Alex Pittendrigh, David Noonan & Simon Trevaks, First Floor, Melbourne
1999	Rubik #3, Video vs Watercolour, Curated by Rubik with Julia Gorman, James Lynch, David Noonan, Ricky Swallow, Andrew McQualter studio, Melbourne
1998	City Lights 2000: Opening Group Show, Hosier Lane, Melbourne
1998	Rubik #1 Launch, Grey Area Art Space Inc, Melbourne
1998	We Are Electric, Curated by David Rosetzky with Andrew McQualter, Foyer/ lightwell, Arts Victoria, Melbourne
1997	Another Green World, With Andrew McQualter, First Floor, Melbourne
1997	Chemistry, With Alexander Pittendrigh & Richard Butler-Bowden, Gertrude Contemporary Art Spaces, Melbourne
1996	Paint ! Sutton Gallery, Melbourne
1994	Opening Group Show :Launch of First Floor, First Floor, Melbourne

== Collections ==
Art Gallery of New South Wales
