= Diego Bengolea =

Bolivian football midfielder (born 1979)

Personal information
- Full name: Diego Didier Bengolea Vargas
- Date of birth: December 7, 1979 (age 46)
- Place of birth: Cochabamba, Bolivia
- Height: 1.73 m (5 ft 8 in)
- Position: Midfielder

Senior career*
Years	Team	Apps	(Gls)
1999–2001	Wilstermann	52	(3)
2002–2003	San José	40	(6)
2004–2006	Aurora	66	(1)
2007	Wilstermann	16	(0)
2008	The Strongest	24	(0)
2009	Bolívar	1	(0)
2010	Universitario de Sucre	11	(0)
2011–2012	Wilstermann		
2012–2013	Aurora	8	(0)

International career
2002–2003	Bolivia	5	(1)
- * Club domestic league appearances and goals as of October 18, 2010

Diego Didier Bengolea Vargas (born December 7, 1979, in Cochabamba), is a Bolivian retired football midfielder.

== Club career ==
Vargas' first club at the professional level was Wilstermann. After three good years and one national title among his achievements, Bengolea moved to San José, where he displayed his best performance yet, earning a spot in the national team. In 2004, he was signed by Aurora where he spent the next three seasons; however, his performance began to experience a decline. In 2007, he returned to Wilstermann but was relegated to the bench nearly the whole season. The following year he joined The Strongest. During the Clausura 2008 he suffered a serious knee injury that put his career to rest for several months. In August 2009, healed and once again ready to play he joined Bolívar.

== International career ==
Between 2002 and 2003, Bengolea played for Bolivia in 5 games scoring one goal. He found the net on a friendly match against Chilean club Cobreloa on August 27, 2003, in La Paz.

== Honours ==
=== Club ===
- Wilstermann
  - Liga de Fútbol Profesional Boliviano: 2000
