= Linda Gojak =

American mathematics educator

Linda M. Gojak is an American mathematics educator who was president of the National Council of Supervisors of Mathematics and, in 2012–2014, of the National Council of Teachers of Mathematics.

== Education and career ==
Gojak is a graduate of Miami University. She earned a master's degree in education, specializing in elementary and middle school mathematics, from Kent State University. She was a mathematics teacher for 28 years, and then in 1999 took a position in the Department of Education and Allied Studies at John Carroll University as director of the Center for Mathematics and Science Education, Teaching, and Technology.

== Books ==
Gojak is the author of books including:

- What's Your Math Problem!?!: Getting to the Heart of Teaching Problem (Shell Education, 2011)
- The Common Core Mathematics Companion: The Standards Decoded (with Ruth Harbin Miles, Corwin, 2016)
- Mathematize It! Going Beyond Key Words to Make Sense of Word Problems (with Kimberly Morrow-Leong and Sara Delano Moore, Corwin, 2020)

== Recognition ==
The Ohio Council of Teachers of Mathematics has named their annual state-level award for middle school teaching as the Linda M. Gojak Award.
