= Joé Flick =

Luxembourgish footballer (born 1979)

Personal information
- Date of birth: 16 July 1979 (age 47)
- Place of birth: Luxembourg
- Height: 1.90 m (6 ft 3 in)
- Position: Goalkeeper

Senior career*
Years	Team	Apps	(Gls)
1999–2001	CS Hobscheid	46	(0)
2001–2002	Union Luxembourg	4	(0)
2002–2007	Jeunesse Esch-sur-Alzette	90	(0)
2007–2014	FC Etzella Ettelbruck	16	(0)

International career^{‡}
2004	Luxembourg	1	(0)
- * Club domestic league appearances and goals as of 27 June 2023 ‡ National team caps and goals as of 23 January 2010

Joé Flick (born 16 July 1979) is a Luxembourgish footballer.

== Club career ==
A goalkeeper, he played for Etzella from 2007, after joining them from Jeunesse Esch-sur-Alzette.
