= August Sackenheim =

German footballer

Personal information
- Date of birth: 5 August 1905
- Date of death: 19 April 1979 (aged 73)
- Position: Forward

Senior career*
Years	Team	Apps	(Gls)
- Guts Muths Dresden

International career
1929–1931	Germany	4	(2)
- * Club domestic league appearances and goals

August Sackenheim (5 August 1905 – 19 April 1979) was a German international footballer.
