= Sarmentose =

Sarmentose may refer to:

- Sarmentose (botany), a term describing plants which have long slender stolons
- Sarmentose (chemistry), a type of sugar
