= Bojan Gojak =

Serbian footballer

Personal information
- Full name: Bojan Gojak
- Date of birth: 28 August 1979 (age 47)
- Place of birth: Prijepolje, SFR Yugoslavia
- Height: 1.89 m (6 ft 2 1/2 in)
- Position: Centre-back

Senior career*
Years	Team	Apps	(Gls)
2001–2002	Takovo		
2002–2003	Sloga Jugomagnat	16	(1)
2003–2005	Takovo	60	(13)
2005–2014	Metalac Gornji Milanovac	214	(16)
- * Club domestic league appearances and goals as of 26 August 2014

Bojan Gojak (Serbian Cyrillic: Бојан Гојак; born 28 August 1979) is a Serbian former football defender.
