= Antonio Sarmiento =

Spanish footballer

Personal information
- Full name: Antonio Manuel Sarmiento García
- Date of birth: 27 July 1979 (age 47)
- Place of birth: Villarrubia, Córdoba, Province of Córdoba, Spain
- Height: 1.75 m (5 ft 9 in)
- Position: Midfielder

Youth career
- Séneca

Senior career*
Years	Team	Apps	(Gls)
1998–1999	Montilla		
1999–2000	Córdoba B		
1999–2005	Córdoba	41	(0)
2000–2001	→ Poli Ejido (loan)	22	(0)
2003–2004	→ Cultural Leonesa (loan)	37	(0)
2005–2015	Lucena	327	(4)
2015–2017	Pozoblanco	58	(0)
2017–2018	Atlético Porcuna	30	(0)
- * Club domestic league appearances and goals

Antonio Manuel Sarmiento García (born 27 July 1979) is a Spanish former footballer who played as a central midfielder.

== Football career ==
Born in the Villarrubia neighborhood of the municipality of Córdoba, Andalusia, Sarmiento made his senior debut for Montilla CF. In the 1999 summer he moved to Córdoba CF, initially assigned to the reserves in Tercera División.

Sarmiento played his first match as a professional on 12 September 1999, replacing Alberto Saavedra in a 0–0 away draw against Mérida UD in the Segunda División championship. He appeared in five matches during the campaign, all from the bench.

Sarmiento spent the 2000–01 season on loan at Polideportivo Ejido, in Segunda División B. He was definitely promoted to the main squad after his return, and appeared regularly for the Verdiblancos during the following campaigns.

On 21 August 2003 Sarmiento moved to Cultural y Deportiva Leonesa, also in a temporary deal. He returned to Córdoba in June 2004, but after appearing sparingly for the latter in 2004–05, he rescinded his link and moved to Lucena CF in the fourth level.

Sarmiento quickly became an important midfield unit for Lucena, appearing regularly and achieving promotion to the third level in 2007. In June 2009 he signed a new deal with the club, being appointed captain in the following year.

Sarmiento played his 200th match for the club on 27 November 2011, starting in a 1–1 home draw against Sporting Villanueva Promesas. He subsequently renewed his contract on 23 June 2012, and was an undisputed starter in the following campaigns.
