= 1989–90 Tercera División =

Tercera División
- Season: 1989–90

The 1989–90 Tercera División season is the 13th season since establishment the tier four.

== League table ==
=== Group 1 ===
Pos	Team	Pld	W	D	L	GF	GA	GD	Pts	Promotion or relegation
1	Compostela	38	27	8	3	71	18	+53	62	Promotion to the Segunda División B
2	Fabril	38	24	8	6	66	35	+31	56	
3	Villalonga	38	22	7	9	62	32	+30	51	
4	Bergantiños	38	16	14	8	53	34	+19	46	
5	Vivero	38	16	12	10	46	35	+11	44	
6	Arenteiro	38	16	10	12	47	38	+9	42	
7	Gran Peña	38	17	8	13	40	40	0	42	
8	Brigantium	38	16	10	12	57	42	+15	42	
9	Turista	38	15	9	14	44	32	+12	39	
10	Órdenes	38	11	15	12	33	31	+2	37	
11	Barco	38	12	11	15	46	47	−1	35	
12	Burela	38	14	7	17	50	62	−12	35	
13	Gondomar	38	12	10	16	39	51	−12	34	
14	Lemos	38	11	12	15	39	42	−3	34	
15	Boiro	38	11	11	16	31	37	−6	33	
16	Puebla	38	12	8	18	35	50	−15	32	Relegation to Regional
17	Tyde	38	11	6	21	44	62	−18	28	Relegation to Regional
18	Corujo	38	9	9	20	45	76	−31	27	Relegation to Regional
19	Juvenil Puent.	38	6	11	21	24	58	−34	23	Relegation to Regional
20	Vista Alegre	38	6	6	26	33	83	−50	18	Relegation to Regional

=== Group 2 ===
Pos	Team	Pld	W	D	L	GF	GA	GD	Pts	Promotion or relegation
1	Vetusta	38	23	10	5	78	28	+50	56	Promotion to the Segunda División B
2	Club Hispano	38	25	5	8	77	29	+48	55	
3	CD Mosconia	38	21	8	9	65	43	+22	50	
4	Caudal Deportivo	38	16	16	6	54	23	+31	48	
5	CD Praviano	38	14	14	10	37	34	+3	42	
6	Club Siero	38	13	15	10	30	31	−1	41	
7	Asturias de Blimea	38	13	14	11	38	34	+4	40	
8	Ribadesella CF	38	13	13	12	28	39	−11	39	
9	Pumarín CF	38	14	10	14	43	47	−4	38	
10	CD Turón	38	12	12	14	50	56	−6	36	
11	Club Marino	38	12	12	14	37	42	−5	36	
12	Deportiva Piloñesa	38	13	9	16	50	46	+4	35	
13	Europa de Nava	38	12	10	16	55	60	−5	34	
14	Real Titánico	38	10	14	14	41	46	−5	34	
15	Luarca CF	38	9	16	13	29	38	−9	34	
16	Santiago de Aller CF	38	11	11	16	36	57	−21	33	
17	Navia CF	38	9	13	16	32	49	−17	31	
18	SD Lenense	38	11	9	18	37	64	−27	31	Relegation to Regional
19	Atlético de Lugones SD	38	8	8	22	28	58	−30	24	Relegation to Regional
20	AD Ribadedeva	38	5	13	20	25	46	−21	23	Relegation to Regional

=== Group 3 ===
Pos	Team	Pld	W	D	L	GF	GA	GD	Pts	Promotion or relegation
1	Gim. Torrelavega	38	29	6	3	98	30	+68	64	Promotion to the Segunda División B
2	Rayo Cantabria	38	24	9	5	81	24	+57	57	
3	Escobedo	38	23	11	4	79	31	+48	57	
4	Santoña	38	23	10	5	68	23	+45	56	
5	Castro	38	16	11	11	52	34	+18	43	
6	Cayón	38	15	13	10	55	47	+8	43	
7	Vimenor	38	17	9	12	58	50	+8	43	
8	Barquereño	38	18	7	13	62	40	+22	43	
9	Pontejos	38	14	8	16	47	59	−12	36	
10	Ayrón Vargas	38	11	10	17	32	47	−15	32	
11	Barreda	38	8	16	14	21	36	−15	32	
12	Noja	38	9	13	16	39	49	−10	31	
13	Selaya	38	12	7	19	39	60	−21	31	
14	Ramales	38	9	12	17	40	62	−22	30	
15	Marina Cudeyo	38	12	6	20	36	62	−26	30	
16	Naval	38	10	9	19	45	69	−24	29	
17	Reocín	38	9	11	18	31	55	−24	29	
18	Unión Club	38	9	10	19	35	52	−17	28	Relegation to Regional
19	Guarnizo	38	9	10	19	33	64	−31	28	Relegation to Regional
20	Gama	38	7	4	27	34	91	−57	18	Relegation to Regional

=== Group 4 ===
Pos	Team	Pld	W	D	L	GF	GA	GD	Pts	Promotion or relegation
1	Dep. Alavés	38	25	10	3	73	26	+47	60	Promotion to the Segunda División B
2	Aurrerá Ond.	38	18	15	5	54	28	+26	51	
3	Tolosa	38	17	15	6	58	26	+32	49	
4	Munguía	38	14	17	7	47	27	+20	45	
5	Real Unión	38	16	10	12	49	35	+14	42	
6	Elgóibar	38	14	13	11	37	31	+6	41	
7	Larramendi	38	15	10	13	44	50	−6	40	
8	Mondragón	38	13	14	11	41	29	+12	40	
9	Zalla	38	14	12	12	35	36	−1	40	
10	Touring	38	12	16	10	36	37	−1	40	
11	Pasajes	38	13	13	12	30	32	−2	39	
12	Amorebieta	38	13	12	13	42	42	0	38	
13	Galdakao	38	14	8	16	51	54	−3	36	
14	Hernani	38	12	12	14	33	40	−7	36	
15	Sodupe	38	10	14	14	31	49	−18	34	
16	Gernika	38	12	9	17	43	50	−7	33	
17	Arenas G.	38	8	17	13	35	39	−4	33	
18	Abechuco	38	8	9	21	34	78	−44	25	Relegation to Regional
19	Zumaya	38	5	12	21	34	55	−21	22	Relegation to Regional
20	Anaitasuna	38	3	10	25	21	64	−43	16	Relegation to Regional

=== Group 5 ===
Pos	Team	Pld	W	D	L	GF	GA	GD	Pts	Promotion or relegation
1	Sant Andreu	38	22	12	4	65	24	+41	56	Promotion to the Segunda División B
2	Barcelona Af.	38	21	8	9	98	51	+47	50	
3	Lloret	38	17	13	8	46	41	+5	47	
4	Martinenc	38	16	13	9	44	31	+13	45	
5	Europa	38	17	10	11	58	41	+17	44	
6	Reus	38	15	12	11	52	49	+3	42	
7	Blanes	38	15	11	12	44	39	+5	41	
8	Gramanet	38	17	7	14	62	50	+12	41	
9	Sant Cugat	38	12	13	13	36	40	−4	37	
10	Igualada	38	13	11	14	55	52	+3	37	
11	Cristinenc	38	12	12	14	52	56	−4	36	
12	Balaguer	38	12	11	15	48	53	−5	35	
13	Olot	38	13	9	16	53	61	−8	35	
14	Júpiter	38	13	9	16	66	66	0	35	
15	Banyoles	38	11	11	16	39	53	−14	33	
16	Esplugues	38	10	13	15	37	52	−15	33	
17	Horta	38	11	10	17	44	68	−24	32	
18	Terrassa	38	13	6	19	39	58	−19	32	Relegation to Regional
19	Vilafranca	38	11	6	21	52	73	−21	28	Relegation to Regional
20	Manresa	38	5	11	22	41	73	−32	21	Relegation to Regional

=== Group 6 ===
==== Group 6 North ====
Pos	Team	Pld	W	D	L	GF	GA	GD	Pts	Qualification or relegation
1	Torrent	34	24	5	5	46	17	+29	53	Promotion play-offs
2	Mestalla	34	23	5	6	82	23	+59	51	
3	Burriana	34	21	6	7	54	20	+34	48	
4	Onda	34	20	7	7	70	27	+43	47	
5	Sueca	34	19	5	10	55	37	+18	43	
6	Betxí	34	16	8	10	51	38	+13	40	
7	Ribarroja	34	14	11	9	46	31	+15	39	
8	Nules	34	14	10	10	52	36	+16	38	
9	Vall de Uxó	34	16	5	13	61	47	+14	37	
10	Lliria	34	14	5	15	59	55	+4	33	
11	Algemesí	34	11	6	17	41	52	−11	28	
12	Alacuás	34	10	8	16	31	50	−19	28	
13	Acero	34	11	5	18	33	55	−22	27	
14	Vinaroz	34	7	12	15	25	44	−19	26	
15	Saguntino	34	8	9	17	29	58	−29	25	
16	Ibarsos	34	7	7	20	31	80	−49	21	Relegation play-offs
17	Foyos	34	4	12	18	23	59	−36	20	Relegation to Regional
18	Requena	34	2	4	28	15	75	−60	8	Relegation to Regional

==== Group 6 South ====
Pos	Team	Pld	W	D	L	GF	GA	GD	Pts	Qualification or relegation
1	Oliva	34	21	7	6	43	21	+22	49	Promotion play-offs
2	Onteniente	34	18	9	7	48	24	+24	45	
3	Carcaixent	34	18	8	8	58	32	+26	44	
4	Ilicitano	34	16	11	7	53	30	+23	43	
5	Albatera	34	15	13	6	42	23	+19	43	
6	Denia	34	14	14	6	44	24	+20	42	
7	Ollería	34	14	8	12	48	39	+9	36	
8	Aspense	34	13	9	12	33	29	+4	35	
9	Pinoso	34	12	10	12	36	39	−3	34	
10	Alicante	34	12	9	13	44	40	+4	33	
11	Monóvar	34	12	9	13	29	40	−11	33	
12	Canals	34	12	7	15	42	51	−9	31	
13	Dolores	34	11	9	14	38	43	−5	31	
14	Horadada	34	11	7	16	37	46	−9	29	
15	Pego	34	10	9	15	33	47	−14	29	
16	Villajoyosa	34	8	11	15	40	44	−4	27	Relegation play-offs
17	Cox	34	5	5	24	19	71	−52	15	Relegation to Regional
18	Bigastro	34	2	9	23	18	62	−44	13	Relegation to Regional

==== Promotion playoff ====
Team 1	Agg.	Team 2	1st leg	2nd leg
Oliva	2-3	Torrent	2-1	0-2

==== Relegation playoff ====
Team 1	Agg.	Team 2	1st leg	2nd leg
Catral	2-4	Villajoyosa	2-0	0-4 (aet)
Paiporta	2-0	Ibarsos	1-0	1-0

=== Group 7 ===
Pos	Team	Pld	W	D	L	GF	GA	GD	Pts	Promotion or relegation
1	Móstoles	38	25	8	5	68	29	+39	58	Promotion to the Segunda División B
2	Fuenlabrada	38	19	10	9	60	37	+23	48	
3	Carabanchel	38	20	8	10	73	50	+23	48	
4	Valdemoro	38	19	7	12	58	42	+16	45	
5	R. Madrid Af.	38	17	10	11	70	42	+28	44	
6	Cubas	38	15	12	11	62	51	+11	42	
7	S.S. Reyes	38	14	13	11	57	54	+3	41	
8	Aranjuez	38	14	13	11	49	41	+8	41	
9	Colmenar	38	14	12	12	51	49	+2	40	
10	Navalcarnero	38	15	8	15	47	55	−8	38	
11	Rayo Vallec. B	38	15	7	16	54	60	−6	37	
12	Alcobendas	38	12	11	15	45	53	−8	35	
13	Vallecas	38	12	10	16	42	65	−23	34	
14	Rayo Majadahonda	38	12	9	17	39	57	−18	33	
15	Vicálvaro	38	12	8	18	52	59	−7	32	
16	Torrejón	38	11	10	17	41	54	−13	32	
17	Parla	38	10	11	17	38	47	−9	31	
18	Puerta Bonita	38	9	11	18	54	73	−19	29	Relegation to Regional
19	San Fernando	38	9	8	21	53	77	−24	26	Relegation to Regional
20	Villaverde	38	8	10	20	41	59	−18	26	Relegation to Regional

=== Group 8 ===
Pos	Team	Pld	W	D	L	GF	GA	GD	Pts	Promotion or relegation
1	Palencia	38	27	6	5	75	25	+50	60	Promotion to the Segunda División B
2	Valladolid Pr.	38	27	6	5	92	26	+66	60	
3	Salmantino	38	19	9	10	63	30	+33	47	
4	Arandina	38	17	11	10	63	40	+23	45	
5	Briviesca	38	16	11	11	49	47	+2	43	
6	Gim. Medinense	38	16	11	11	45	36	+9	43	
7	Bembibre	38	16	10	12	37	28	+9	42	
8	Astorga	38	14	13	11	44	41	+3	41	
9	Zamora	38	17	6	15	47	40	+7	40	
10	Lermeño	38	14	11	13	48	44	+4	39	
11	Almazán	38	15	8	15	48	43	+5	38	
12	Whisky Dyc	38	11	12	15	40	53	−13	34	
13	Gim. Segoviana	38	12	9	17	35	50	−15	33	
14	Hullera	38	9	15	14	33	57	−24	33	
15	Benavente	38	10	10	18	33	55	−22	30	
16	La Bañeza	38	8	13	17	35	52	−17	29	
17	Endesa Ponf.	38	11	6	21	47	72	−25	28	
18	B. San José	38	10	8	20	35	74	−39	28	Relegation to Regional
19	Herrera	38	7	10	21	35	64	−29	24	Relegation to Regional
20	Ctral. León	38	8	7	23	40	67	−27	23	Relegation to Regional

=== Group 9 ===
Pos	Team	Pld	W	D	L	GF	GA	GD	Pts	Promotion or relegation
1	Los Boliches	38	24	10	4	67	23	+44	58	Promotion to the Segunda División B
2	Fuengirola	38	22	12	4	66	17	+49	56	Promotion to the Segunda División B
3	Poli. Ejido	38	20	11	7	58	34	+24	51	
4	Ronda	38	21	7	10	68	32	+36	49	
5	At. Malagueño	38	20	7	11	64	38	+26	47	
6	At. Macael	38	14	14	10	35	22	+13	42	
7	Martos	38	17	5	16	44	46	−2	39	
8	Guadix	38	12	15	11	48	36	+12	39	
9	Motril	38	14	9	15	40	44	−4	37	
10	Pol. Almería	38	15	6	17	43	52	−9	36	
11	Maracena	38	12	11	15	53	55	−2	35	
12	Úbeda	38	12	11	15	37	45	−8	35	
13	Vélez	38	11	12	15	38	55	−17	34	
14	Nerja	38	12	9	17	47	54	−7	33	
15	Benamiel	38	12	8	18	39	50	−11	32	
16	Mijas	38	11	10	17	36	60	−24	32	
17	Antequerano	38	10	11	17	34	57	−23	31	
18	Torremolinos	38	7	14	17	33	62	−29	28	Relegation to Regional
19	San Pedro	38	10	8	20	37	58	−21	28	Relegation to Regional
20	El Palo	38	5	8	25	31	78	−47	18	Relegation to Regional

=== Group 10 ===
Pos	Team	Pld	W	D	L	GF	GA	GD	Pts	Promotion or relegation
1	Betis Dep.	38	20	16	2	64	26	+38	56	Promotion to the Segunda División B
2	Portuense	38	22	9	7	65	32	+33	53	
3	San Roque	38	19	10	9	49	35	+14	48	
4	Algeciras	38	13	19	6	51	31	+20	45	
5	Pozoblanco	38	16	13	9	53	33	+20	45	
6	San Fernando	38	16	12	10	58	39	+19	44	
7	Lebrija	38	14	12	12	47	35	+12	40	
8	Écija	38	14	12	12	48	40	+8	40	
9	Santaella	38	16	7	15	54	56	−2	39	
10	Palma Río	38	12	15	11	39	40	−1	39	
11	Coria	38	13	13	12	43	44	−1	39	
12	Chiclana	38	14	10	14	44	52	−8	38	
13	Ayamonte	38	13	12	13	45	49	−4	38	
14	Cádiz B	38	11	14	13	47	52	−5	36	
15	La Palma	38	12	11	15	43	52	−9	35	
16	Montilla	38	9	13	16	30	41	−11	31	
17	Puerto Real	38	7	16	15	27	40	−13	30	
18	Dos Hermanas	38	10	9	19	43	52	−9	29	Relegation to Regional
19	Rota	38	6	12	20	34	63	−29	24	Relegation to Regional
20	At. Ceuta	38	3	5	30	22	94	−72	11	Relegation to Regional

=== Group 11 ===
Pos	Team	Pld	W	D	L	GF	GA	GD	Pts	Promotion or relegation
1	Manacor	38	24	9	5	86	31	+55	57	Promotion to the Segunda División B
2	Alayor	38	15	19	4	59	21	+38	49	
3	Cala d'Or	38	20	9	9	75	43	+32	49	
4	Cade Paguera	38	18	10	10	80	41	+39	46	
5	Portmany	38	17	12	9	57	44	+13	46	
6	Maganova	38	16	11	11	48	44	+4	43	
7	Cala Millor	38	16	8	14	49	44	+5	40	
8	Santa Ponsa	38	12	15	11	50	48	+2	39	
9	Santa Eulalia	38	14	11	13	46	50	−4	39	
10	Ferrerías	38	15	8	15	43	46	−3	38	
11	Arenal	38	13	11	14	40	57	−17	37	
12	Cardessar	38	10	15	13	33	44	−11	35	
13	Hospitalet	38	10	15	13	46	58	−12	35	
14	Poblense	38	12	11	15	42	55	−13	35	
15	Isleño	38	13	7	18	44	67	−23	33	
16	Sóller	38	10	11	17	39	57	−18	31	
17	Constancia	38	7	15	16	30	42	−12	29	Relegation to Regional
18	Porto Cristo	38	11	5	22	37	62	−25	27	Relegation to Regional
19	Felanitx	38	7	13	18	44	65	−21	27	Relegation to Regional
20	Llosetense	38	7	11	20	44	73	−29	25	Relegation to Regional

=== Group 12 ===
Pos	Team	Pld	W	D	L	GF	GA	GD	Pts	Promotion or relegation
1	Las Palmas At.	38	22	9	7	77	29	+48	53	Promotion to the Segunda División B
2	Corralejo	38	17	12	9	47	27	+20	46	
3	Puerto Cruz	38	19	8	11	69	51	+18	46	
4	Ibarra	38	17	9	12	65	53	+12	43	
5	I'Gara	38	16	9	13	64	50	+14	41	
6	Orotava	38	15	11	12	54	48	+6	41	
7	Vecindario	38	12	17	9	42	42	0	41	
8	Arguineguín	38	13	14	11	47	42	+5	40	
9	Ferreras	38	15	9	14	55	40	+15	39	
10	Aridane	38	14	10	14	47	46	+1	38	
11	Laguna	38	13	12	13	57	58	−1	38	
12	Mensajero	38	14	10	14	63	50	+13	38	
13	Tenisca	38	12	13	13	46	55	−9	37	
14	Águilas	38	13	9	16	37	62	−25	35	
15	Las Torres	38	13	9	16	43	58	−15	35	
16	Unión Tejina	38	12	10	16	46	52	−6	34	
17	At. Paso	38	11	11	16	37	46	−9	33	Relegation to Regional
18	Gomera	38	10	8	20	40	70	−30	28	Relegation to Regional
19	Icodense	38	11	5	22	33	60	−27	27	Relegation to Regional
20	Artesano	38	10	7	21	31	61	−30	27	Relegation to Regional

=== Group 13 ===
Pos	Team	Pld	W	D	L	GF	GA	GD	Pts	Promotion or relegation
1	Yeclano	38	27	10	1	81	22	+59	64	Promotion to the Segunda División B
2	Águilas	38	21	10	7	56	26	+30	52	
3	Mar Menor	38	18	11	9	51	30	+21	47	
4	Imperial	38	17	12	9	58	36	+22	46	
5	Roldán	38	20	6	12	56	33	+23	46	
6	Abarán	38	18	9	11	52	30	+22	45	
7	Olímpico Tot.	38	15	14	9	53	39	+14	44	
8	Torre Pacheco	38	18	7	13	54	40	+14	43	
9	Alberca	38	17	9	12	52	44	+8	43	
10	Santomera	38	17	7	14	47	48	−1	41	
11	Lorca	38	15	10	13	42	40	+2	40	
12	Cieza	38	15	8	15	43	48	−5	38	
13	Barinas	38	11	12	15	32	51	−19	34	
14	Naval	38	11	10	17	31	45	−14	32	
15	Algar	38	12	8	18	44	62	−18	32	
16	Unión At.	38	9	9	20	37	56	−19	27	
17	Cehegín	38	7	13	18	45	65	−20	27	
18	Beniel	38	8	10	20	33	53	−20	26	Relegation to Regional
19	Sangonera	38	7	7	24	35	76	−41	21	Relegation to Regional
20	Moratalla	38	2	8	28	13	71	−58	12	Relegation to Regional

=== Group 14 ===
Pos	Team	Pld	W	D	L	GF	GA	GD	Pts	Promotion or relegation
1	Extremadura	38	30	5	3	124	18	+106	65	Promotion to the Segunda División B
2	Cacereño	38	28	9	1	82	15	+67	65	
3	Don Benito	38	27	8	3	135	31	+104	62	
4	Plasencia	38	24	9	5	81	24	+57	57	
5	San Serván	38	21	7	10	53	36	+17	49	
6	Villanovense	38	19	5	14	46	39	+7	43	
7	Badajoz Pr.	38	16	10	12	50	39	+11	42	
8	Puebla Patria	38	11	19	8	44	35	+9	41	
9	Vasco Núñez	38	15	9	14	59	62	−3	39	
10	Díter Zafra	38	15	8	15	51	45	+6	38	
11	Moralo	38	12	12	14	53	57	−4	36	
12	Montijo	38	13	9	16	49	51	−2	35	
13	Castuera	38	11	8	19	35	74	−39	30	
14	Villafranca	38	10	9	19	46	63	−17	29	
15	Miajadas	38	11	7	20	41	77	−36	29	
16	La Estrella	38	8	12	18	42	63	−21	28	
17	Sanvicenteño	38	6	11	21	26	75	−49	23	
18	Pueblonuevo	38	3	11	24	31	111	−80	17	Relegation to Regional
19	Orellana	38	6	5	27	30	107	−77	17	Relegation to Regional
20	Malpartida	38	4	7	27	29	85	−56	15	Relegation to Regional

=== Group 15 ===
Pos	Team	Pld	W	D	L	GF	GA	GD	Pts	Promotion or relegation
1	Izarra	38	25	5	8	76	34	+42	55	Promotion to the Segunda División B
2	Tudelano	38	24	6	8	81	42	+39	54	
3	Alfaro	38	22	8	8	72	41	+31	52	
4	San Juan	38	18	10	10	61	50	+11	46	
5	Berceo	38	17	11	10	48	47	+1	45	
6	San Adrián	38	15	12	11	51	43	+8	42	
7	Ribaforada	38	16	8	14	60	53	+7	40	
8	Oberena	38	15	10	13	61	57	+4	40	
9	Arnedo	38	13	13	12	55	44	+11	39	
10	Burladés	38	12	14	12	35	40	−5	38	
11	Peña Sport	38	14	10	14	65	53	+12	38	
12	Logroñés Pr.	38	14	9	15	54	43	+11	37	
13	Haro	38	12	13	13	54	54	0	37	
14	Chantrea	38	14	7	17	47	49	−2	35	
15	Egüés	38	13	7	18	55	57	−2	33	
16	Artajonés	38	12	8	18	40	54	−14	32	
17	River Ebro	38	10	12	16	36	55	−19	32	
18	Beti Onak	38	8	12	18	39	65	−26	28	Relegation to Regional
19	Baztán	38	9	8	21	39	66	−27	26	Relegation to Regional
20	Corellano	38	3	5	30	32	114	−82	11	Relegation to Regional

=== Group 16 ===
Pos	Team	Pld	W	D	L	GF	GA	GD	Pts	Promotion or relegation
1	Huesca	38	27	9	2	73	21	+52	63	Promotion to the Segunda División B
2	Sabiñánigo	38	22	12	4	88	39	+49	56	
3	Caspe	38	22	7	9	80	40	+40	51	
4	Alcañiz	38	17	13	8	40	25	+15	47	
5	Sariñena	38	17	12	9	73	39	+34	46	
6	Mallén	38	16	13	9	56	45	+11	45	
7	Ejea	38	16	10	12	63	54	+9	42	
8	Utrillas	38	14	14	10	47	52	−5	42	
9	Alcorisa	38	16	7	15	52	52	0	39	
10	Tauste	38	14	10	14	63	50	+13	38	
11	Monzalbarba	38	13	12	13	47	49	−2	38	
12	Monzón	38	14	8	16	49	48	+1	36	
13	Calatayud	38	13	9	16	38	52	−14	35	
14	Peralta	38	12	8	18	60	69	−9	32	
15	Almudévar	38	12	7	19	38	54	−16	31	
16	Tarazona	38	10	11	17	44	58	−14	31	
17	Hernán Cortés	38	12	7	19	52	74	−22	31	Relegation to Regional
18	Tamarite	38	9	8	21	45	72	−27	26	Relegation to Regional
19	Gelsa	38	4	8	26	31	76	−45	16	Relegation to Regional
20	Luceni	38	2	11	25	21	91	−70	15	Relegation to Regional

=== Group 17 ===
Pos	Team	Pld	W	D	L	GF	GA	GD	Pts	Promotion or relegation
1	Valdepeñas	38	22	12	4	57	28	+29	56	Promotion to the Segunda División B
2	Alcázar	38	22	9	7	63	35	+28	53	
3	Talavera	38	22	7	9	66	34	+32	51	
4	Motilla	38	18	12	8	63	34	+29	48	
5	Portillo	38	17	14	7	41	25	+16	48	
6	Guadalajara	38	17	11	10	53	37	+16	45	
7	Daimiel	38	15	9	14	54	52	+2	39	
8	Villarrobledo	38	12	13	13	42	40	+2	37	
9	Manzanares	38	11	15	12	39	43	−4	37	
10	Fuensalida	38	11	14	13	36	40	−4	36	
11	La Solana	38	12	12	14	41	49	−8	36	
12	Quintanar	38	10	16	12	41	47	−6	36	
13	Azuqueca	38	11	13	14	53	57	−4	35	
14	Conquense	38	9	15	14	36	39	−3	33	
15	Madridejos	38	10	12	16	39	55	−16	32	
16	Los Yébenes	38	9	14	15	38	50	−12	32	
17	Villacañas	38	7	17	14	33	52	−19	31	
18	Campillo	38	10	11	17	39	51	−12	31	Relegation to Regional
19	La Roda	38	9	9	20	36	49	−13	27	Relegation to Regional
20	Puertollano	38	5	7	26	18	71	−53	17	Relegation to Regional
