= UD Fuengirola Los Boliches =

Fuengirola Los Boliches
- Full name: Unión Deportiva Fuengirola Los Boliches
- Founded: 2001
- Ground: Municipal, Fuengirola, Andalusia, Spain
- Capacity: 2,000
- Chairman: Pedro Caballero
- Manager: Álex Soler
- League: Primera Andaluza Málaga
- 2025–26: Primera Andaluza Málaga, 8th of 16
| Home colours | Away colours |

Unión Deportiva Fuengirola Los Boliches is a Spanish football team based in Fuengirola, Málaga, in the autonomous community of Andalusia. Founded in 2001, it plays in Primera Andaluza Málaga, holding home matches at Estadio Municipal de Santa Fe de los Boliches.

== Season to season ==
| Season | Tier | Division | Place | Copa del Rey |
|---|---|---|---|---|
| 2001–02 | 5 | Reg. Pref. | 1st | |
| 2002–03 | 5 | Reg. Pref. | 3rd | |
| 2003–04 | 5 | Reg. Pref. | 1st | |
| 2004–05 | 4 | 3ª | 7th | |
| 2005–06 | 4 | 3ª | 8th | |
| 2006–07 | 4 | 3ª | 9th | |
| 2007–08 | 4 | 3ª | 18th | |
| 2008–09 | 5 | 1ª And. | 11th | |
| 2009–10 | 5 | 1ª And. | 9th | |
| 2010–11 | 5 | 1ª And. | 11th | |
| 2011–12 | 5 | 1ª And. | 7th | |
| 2012–13 | 5 | 1ª And. | 11th | |
| 2013–14 | 5 | 1ª And. | 12th | |
| 2014–15 | 5 | 1ª And. | 14th | |
| 2015–16 | 5 | 1ª And. | 18th | |
| 2016–17 | 6 | 1ª And. | 9th | |
| 2017–18 | 6 | 1ª And. | 17th | |
| 2018–19 | 7 | 2ª And. | 5th | |
| 2019–20 | 7 | 2ª And. | 5th | |
| 2020–21 | 7 | 2ª And. | 2nd | |

| Season | Tier | Division | Place | Copa del Rey |
|---|---|---|---|---|
| 2021–22 | 7 | 1ª And. | 14th | |
| 2022–23 | 7 | 1ª And. | 15th | |
| 2023–24 | 8 | 2ª And. | 2nd | |
| 2024–25 | 7 | 1ª And. | 8th | |
| 2025–26 | 7 | 1ª And. | | |

- 4 seasons in Tercera División
