= Germán Dévora =

Spanish footballer (born 1943)

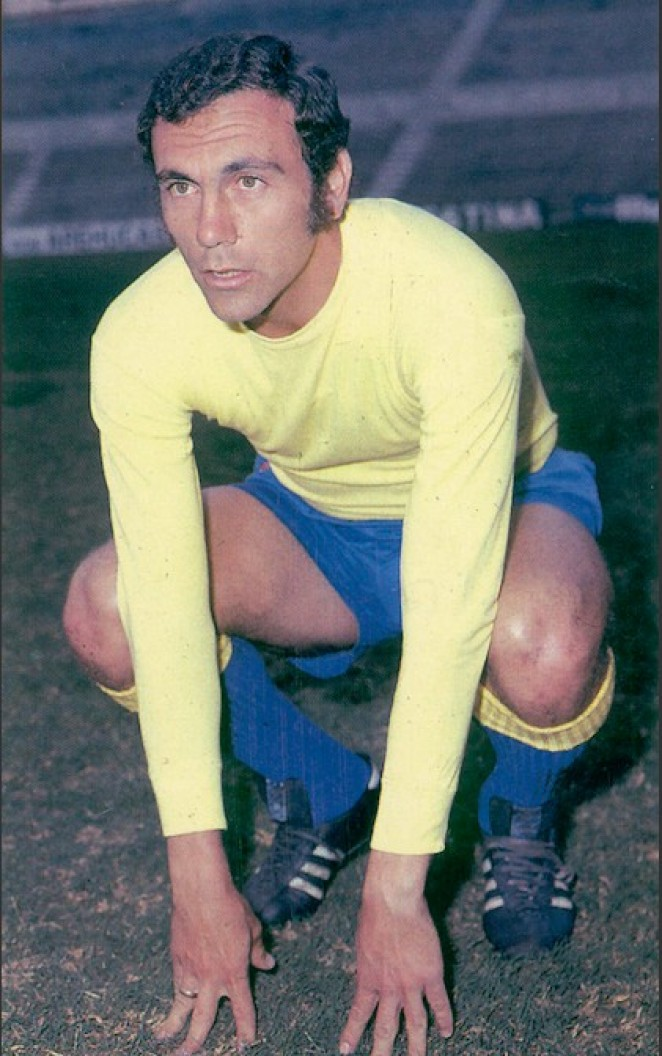

Personal information
- Full name: Germán Dévora Ceballos
- Date of birth: 16 November 1943 (age 82)
- Place of birth: Las Palmas, Canary Islands, Spain
- Height: 1.78 m (5 ft 10 in)
- Positions: Midfielder; forward

Youth career
- 1958–1962: Las Palmas

Senior career*
Years	Team	Apps	(Gls)
1962–1978	Las Palmas	453	(119)
Total		388	(119)

International career
1962	Spain U18	3	(0)
1968–1972	Spain	5	(0)
- * Club domestic league appearances and goals

Germán Dévora Ceballos (born 16 November 1943) is a retired Spanish football player and manager. Nicknamed "El Maestro" or simply known as Germán, he played as a midfielder for Las Palmas for his entire professional career throughout the 1960s and the 1970s. He also represented his home country of Spain of Spain in two victories and three draws.

== Club career ==
Germán began his career by playing football in the Playa de Las Canteras, eventually playing street football with Estrella Blanca. This would lead him to catch the interest of UD Las Palmas as he would enroll in the youth sector at 15 years of age where he would play for the next three years until his promotion to the senior squad. He would be a part of the winning squad in the club obtaining the national youth title in the 1961–62 under manager Luis Molowny with the club being nicknamed the "Diablillos Amarillos".

With his successes in the youth ranks, Germán would be immediately promoted to the senior squad and be a part of the Starting XI for the 1962–63 season with his debut match being on 16 September 1962 in a match against Recreativo de Huelva. In 28 October, he would score his first goal during a home match against Sevilla. The season would also see José Manuel León, Juan Guedes and Tonono join Germán in being recent rookies to the senior squad as they would go on to take over the Starting XI in the 1970s under club manager Rosendo Hernández. In the succeeding 1963–64 season, the club would successfully see promotion following the results of the 1963–64 Segunda División with Germán scoring 12 goals as he would become the club's top goalscorer under manager Vicente Dauder.

In the 1964–65 season, Germán scored 8 goals, playing 28 matches of the 1964–65 La Liga with the club ultimately finishing in 9th place. The 1965–66 season would see Germán undergo obligatory military service as he could play in four goals in the entire career. When recalling this period of his life, he would comment the following:

It was disastrous for me, as I had practically not participated.

The late 1960s would be a period of success for Germán as during the 1967–68 season, under his former youth manager Luis Molowny, the club would rank 3rd in the 1967–68 La Liga, shy of 4 points behind season champions Real Madrid with Germán scoring 7 of the 56 goals made for the club. The following 1968–69 season would see Germán and his club reach the highest achievement in the top flight of Spanish football as they would reach 2nd place. This would earn the club participation for the 1969–70 Inter-Cities Fairs Cup where they would lose 1–0 against Hertha BSC.

The 1969–70 season would see Germán play in 25 matches as well as score 5 goals with the club finishing 9th. Molowny would end up leaving the club in 1970. When describing his former youth coach, Germán stated how he was:

A man of kindness, tact and respect as well as a manager that I was perfectly familiar with both as a player and as a person. He knew how to train me since my youth as I felt comfortable.

The early 1970s would see Germán become the top goalscorer once more as he would score 6 goals in the 1970–71 season and score 15 in the 1971–72 season as well as narrowly missing out on earning the Pichichi Trophy as he would end up in 2nd place for the 1971–72 La Liga with the club resulting in 14th and 5th places respectively. The following 1972–73 season would see Germán score 13 goals for the 1972–73 La Liga with him ending up in 3rd place for the Pichichi Trophy with the club ending in 11th place. The following 1973–74 season would see the club end in 11th place and Germán scoring 10 goals in 32 matches.

The 1974–75 season would see Germán score 9 goals as well as the club finishing 13th place. The 1975–76 season would be met with similar results as Germán would score 4 goals in 25 matches as the club would finish once more in 13th place. Whilst Germán would only score a single goal in 21 matches during the 1976–77 season, the club would ultimately finish in 4th place and was thus considered a good season for the club. The 1977–78 season would be the last season in where Germán would play as a professional footballer as he would only play in six matches without a single goal with his last match would be an away match against Salamanca on 16 April 1978. Three days later, he would be at the bench for the 1978 Copa del Rey final where he ultimately wouldn't play as the club would lose 3–1 against Barcelona at the Estadio Santiago Bernabéu.

Throughout the 16 seasons where he would play for the senior squad, he would score 109 goals, beocming the top scorer in the club's history as he would score 129 in his entire career for the club. He would also make 453 in his entire career for the club. Regarding this achievement, he would comment the following:

"I didn't score many goals, what happened was that Las Palmas never had a born goalscorer as I gave good shots before the arena. Through scoring free kicks and penalties; these were how I scored my goals but these weren't significant figures."

== International career ==
Germán's international career would begin with his participation in the 1962 UEFA European Under-18 Championship held in Romania following the successes of his youth career. He would debut in the 1–1 draw against France U18 as well as the 2–0 loss against Hungary U18 and the 1–0 loss against Turkey U18, eliminating Spain from the tournament.

He would return to be called up to Spain in two friendlies against Sweden and France on 2 May and 17 October 1968 respectively where he would play alongside other players such as Tonono, Juan Guedes, Paco Castellano and Yeyo Santos. He would then be called up to play in the 1970 FIFA World Cup qualifiers, first playing in the 0–0 draw against Yugoslavia as well as how he would be blamed for the 1–1 draw in a home game against Belgium on 11 December 1968 by the press. He would return on two occasions in 1972 in a 1–0 victory in a friendly against Argentina as well as his participation in the first match of the 1974 FIFA World Cup qualifiers in where Spain would draw 2–2 against Yugoslavia by club manager László Kubala as this would end up being the final match of his international career.

== Managerial career ==
Germán would also serve as a club manager with most his career being as a caretaker manager for both Las Palmas as well as for Gáldar. His first season would have him oversee the final two matches of the 1983–84 season as he would oversee five matches of the 1985–86 season, fifteen in the 1986–87 season, sixteen in the 1987–88 season and fifteen in the 1988–89 season. He would then manage the reserve team Las Palmas Atlético for the 1990–91 season as he would oversee 37 matches but wouldn't finish the season. He once again returned to the senior squad for the 1991–92 season in only two matches where the club would be relegated to the 1992–93 Segunda División B by the end of the season. Germán would have his only complete season as manager for Gáldar's 1995–96 season with 38 matches played as well as the first half of the 1996–97 season in 19 matches.

== Later life ==
Germán later served as a technical secretary as well as a coordinador of the chain of subsidiaries. He has also served as honorary president since July 2011. On 1 December 2014, during a presentation by journalist Nacho Acedo of his biographical book Germán Dévora el Maestro, Germán would receive a standing ovation for his career from local authorities such as Paulino Rivero, president of the Canary Islands, manager of the Spain national team Vicente del Bosque as well as former players of his generation including Josep María Fusté, Enrique Wolff, Francisco Castellano and many others. A couple of months later in February 2015, one of the entrances of the Estadio de Gran Canaria would be named in his honor. In May 2015, he would be given the title of "favorite child of Las Palmas" by the city hall of Las Palmas alongside basketball player Carmelo Cabrera and tennis player Carla Suárez Navarro.

== See also ==
- List of one-club men in association football
