= Pezzolesi =

Pezzolesi is a surname. Notable people with the surname include:

- Matías Pezzolesi (born 2002), Argentine football defender, brother of Valentín
- Valentín Pezzolesi (born 2007), Spanish football defender, brother of Matías
