= List of UE Lleida managers =

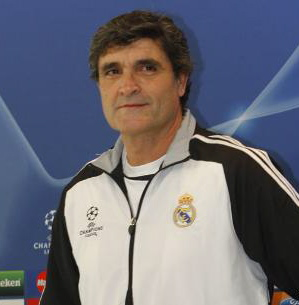
Juande Ramos was the manager of the club between 1997 and 1998.

UE Lleida is a semiprofessional association football club based in Lleida, Spain, which plays in Segunda División B. This chronological list comprises all those who have held the position of manager of the first team of UE Lleida from 1939 to the present day. Each manager's entry includes his dates of tenure and the club's overall competitive record (in terms of matches won, drawn and lost), honours won and significant achievements while under his care. Caretaker managers are included, where known.

The most successful UE Lleida manager in terms of trophies won is José Manuel Esnal Mané, who won one Segunda División title and one Segunda División B in his 6-year reign as manager. He is also the club's longest-serving manager. José María Cabo is Lleida's most successful permanent manager in terms of percentage of wins with 65.91%, while Miguel Rubio is team's least successful (13.04%). (20 games at last).

Emili Vicente is Lleida's current manager, replacing Javier Zubillaga, whose contract ended in June 2008.

== Key ==
- GF = Goals for
- GA = Goals against
- Win% = Percentage of win

== List of managers ==
Information correct as of match played May 15th, 2011. Only competitive matches are counted.

Name	Nationality	From	To	M (Note: Only Liga matches are counted.)	W	D	L	GF	GA	Win% (Note: Win% is rounded to two decimal places)	Honours	Notes
Manuel López	Spain	1939	1940	10	8	0	2	31	9	80.00	1 Segunda Regional	(Note: Club's first full-time manager)
José Pérez	Spain	1940	1941	12	8	1	3	49	17	66.67	1 Segunda Regional	
José María Cabo	Spain	1941	1942	44	29	6	9	139	71	65.91		
Ramón Llorens	Spain	1942	1943	40	15	6	19	70	77	37.50		
José Luis Zabala	Spain	1943	1944	18	3	5	10	20	51	16.67		
Antonio Franco	Spain	1944	1947	68	26	9	33	124	153	38.24		
José Peralta	Spain	1947	1948	26	12	5	9	45	32	46.15		
Juan Romans	Spain	1948	1949	26	16	5	5	57	36	61.54	1 Tercera	
Emilio Vidal	Spain	1949	January 1951	47	22	2	23	102	130	46.81		
Francisco Pirla	Spain	January 1951	June 1951	13	4	0	9	15	50	30.77		(Note: Formerly played for the club)
Juan Gómez de Lecube	Spain	June 1951	February 1952	21	9	3	9	34	29	42.86		
José María Burset	Spain	February 1952	June 1952	9	5	1	3	7	23	55.56		
Rogelio Santiago Lelé	Spain	August 1952	June 1954	60	30	10	20	110	83	50.00		
Gaspar Rubio	Spain	July 1954	December 1954	12	4	3	5	14	23	33.33		
Juan José Nogués	Spain	December 1954	June 1955	18	6	4	8	30	33	33.33		
José Valero	Spain	August 1955	June 1956	30	11	4	15	53	63	36.67		
Vicente Sasot	Spain	September 1956	December 1956	15	1	2	12	11	40	6.67		
Edmundo Suárez Mundo	Spain	December 1956	July 1957	23	7	1	15	27	54	30.43		
Rogelio Santiago Lelé	Spain	September 1957	June 1959	76	42	13	21	157	93	55.26		
Miklós Szegedi	Romania	June 1959	June 1960	30	15	3	12	67	56	50.00		
José Rivero	Spain	June 1960	December 1960	13	6	2	5	25	24	46.15		
Antonio Molinos	Spain	December 1960	June 1961	17	7	2	8	36	32	41.18		
Manuel Bademunt	Spain	August 1961	June 1962	30	14	7	9	57	39	46.67		
Gabriel Taltavull	Spain	June 1962	December 1962	14	10	1	3	35	13	71.43		
Marcel Domingo	France	December 1962	June 1963	16	7	4	5	39	18	43.75		
Rogelio Santiago Lelé	Spain	July 1963	October 1964	43	27	4	12	92	48	62.79		
José Seguer	Spain	October 1964	December 1966	76	29	24	23	101	72	38.16		
Rosendo Hernández	Spain	December 1966	June 1967	17	5	5	7	22	26	29.41		
Enrique Martín	Spain	June 1967	December 1967	12	3	2	7	10	20	25.00		
Manuel Bademunt	Spain	December 1967	December 1967	1	0	0	1	0	5	0.00		
Miguel Murueta	Spain	December 1967	July 1968	17	5	6	6	15	26	29.41		
José Juncosa	Spain	July 1968	October 1968	4	0	1	3	3	8	0.00		
Satur Grech	Spain	October 1968	May 1969	29	17	5	7	44	27	58.62		
Manuel Bademunt	Spain	May 1969	October 1969	11	3	3	5	17	20	27.27		
José Luis Riera	Spain	October 1969	June 1970	32	16	7	9	47	31	50.00		
Agustín Faura	Spain	June 1970	March 1971	26	15	5	6	42	20	57.69		
Satur Grech	Spain	March 1971	June 1971	12	9	1	2	20	8	75.00	1 Regional Preferente	
Manuel Ruiz Sosa	Spain	June 1971	August 1972	38	16	13	9	44	29	42.11		
Jesús Moreno Manzaneque	Spain	August 1972	April 1973	31	12	8	11	32	33	38.71		
Manuel Bademunt	Spain	April 1973	June 1973	7	4	2	1	11	5	57.14		
Jorge Solsona	Spain	June 1973	January 1974	19	8	5	6	22	22	42.11		
Manuel Bademunt	Spain	January 1974	June 1974	19	6	6	7	25	27	31.58		
Miguel Bertral	Spain	June 1974	December 1974	16	4	5	7	12	21	25.00		
Vicente Sasot	Spain	December 1974	July 1975	22	8	6	8	17	27	36.36		
Juan Vázquez	Spain	July 1975	November 1975	10	5	0	5	9	11	50.00		
Jorge Solsona	Spain	November 1975	October 1976	35	13	12	10	51	41	37.14		
Manuel Buján	Spain	October 1976	November 1976	3	2	0	1	8	1	66.67		
Joaquín Carreras	Spain	November 1976	January 1977	10	5	1	4	21	18	50.00		
Manuel Buján	Spain	January 1977	February 1977	3	0	0	3	3	6	0.00		
Joaquín Carreras	Spain	February 1977	June 1977	15	6	5	4	19	20	40.00		
Ignacio López	Spain	July 1977	May 1978	38	13	8	17	39	46	34.21		
Ignacio Martín Esperanza	Spain	May 1978	January 1980	56	20	17	19	74	60	35.71		
Manuel Buján	Spain	January 1980	May 1980	20	9	5	6	22	20	45.00		
Lluís Aloy	Spain	May 1980	February 1981	24	11	4	9	29	30	45.83		
Manuel Buján	Spain	February 1981	May 1982	52	16	16	20	55	66	30.77		
Roberto Álvarez	Spain	June 1982	May 1985	114	46	31	37	150	130	40.35		
Jordi Gonzalvo	Spain	May 1985	May 1988	118	55	35	28	173	94	46.61		
Koldo Aguirre	Spain	May 1988	December 1988	16	4	3	9	11	21	25.00		
José Manuel Esnal Mané	Spain	December 1988	June 1995	250	109	68	73	336	227	43.60	1 Segunda División; 1 Segunda División B	
Antonio López	Spain	July 1995	January 1996	18	4	6	8	18	27	22.22		
Ramon Puig Solsona	Spain	January 1996	January 1996	1	0	1	0	1	1	0.00		
Txetxu Rojo	Spain	January 1996	January 1997	35	12	11	12	41	41	34.29		
Miguel Rubio	Spain	January 1997	January 1997	3	1	0	2	3	6	33.33		
Paco Martínez Bonachera	Spain	January 1997	June 1997	19	7	6	6	25	15	36.84		
Juande Ramos	Spain	July 1997	May 1998	42	18	9	15	50	46	42.86		
Miquel Corominas	Spain	June 1998	February 1999	24	8	9	7	25	23	33.33		
Miguel Rubio	Spain	February 1999	March 1999	3	2	1	0	3	1	66.67		
Víctor Muñoz	Spain	March 1999	June 2000	57	23	13	21	90	78	40.35		
Miguel Rubio	Spain	July 2000	February 2001	23	3	8	12	21	32	13.04		
Quique Hernández	Spain	February 2001	June 2001	19	2	5	12	19	33	10.53		
Carles Viladegut	Spain	June 2001	April 2002	31	13	6	12	45	50	41.94		
Paco Martínez Bonachera	Spain	April 2002	October 2003	54	21	16	17	63	60	38.89		
Miguel Rubio	Spain	October 2003	May 2006	106	39	25	42	120	122	36.79	1 Segunda División B	
David Vidal	Spain	May 2006	June 2006	7	2	2	3	8	10	28.57		
Felipe Miñambres	Spain	June 2006	January 2007	21	7	9	5	24	17	33.33		
Esteban Vigo	Spain	January 2007	April 2007	10	3	4	3	9	8	30.00		
Manuel Buján	Spain	April 2007	May 2007	7	2	0	5	11	13	28.57		
Javier Zubillaga	Spain	June 2007	May 2008	38	11	15	12	38	44	28.95		
Emili Vicente	Spain	June 2008	May 2011	114	43	36	35	136	112	37.72		
