= Adrian Rodriguez =

Adrian Rodriguez or Adrián Rodríguez may refer to:

- Adrián Rodríguez (actor), (born 1988), Spanish actor and singer from Catalonia
- Adrian Rodriguez (DJ) {fl. 1994–2002), German trance producer and DJ
- Adrián Rodríguez (footballer, born 2000), Argentine football goalkeeper
- Adrián Rodríguez (footballer, born 2005), Spanish football defender
- Adrian Rodriguez (musician), American musician, member and bassist of The Airborne Toxic Event
- Adri Rodrígues (born Adrián Rodrígues Gonçalves, 1988), Andorran international footballer

== See also ==
- Adriana Rodríguez Vizcarra (born 1949), Mexican politician
