= 1968–69 La Liga =

28th season of La Liga

Primera División
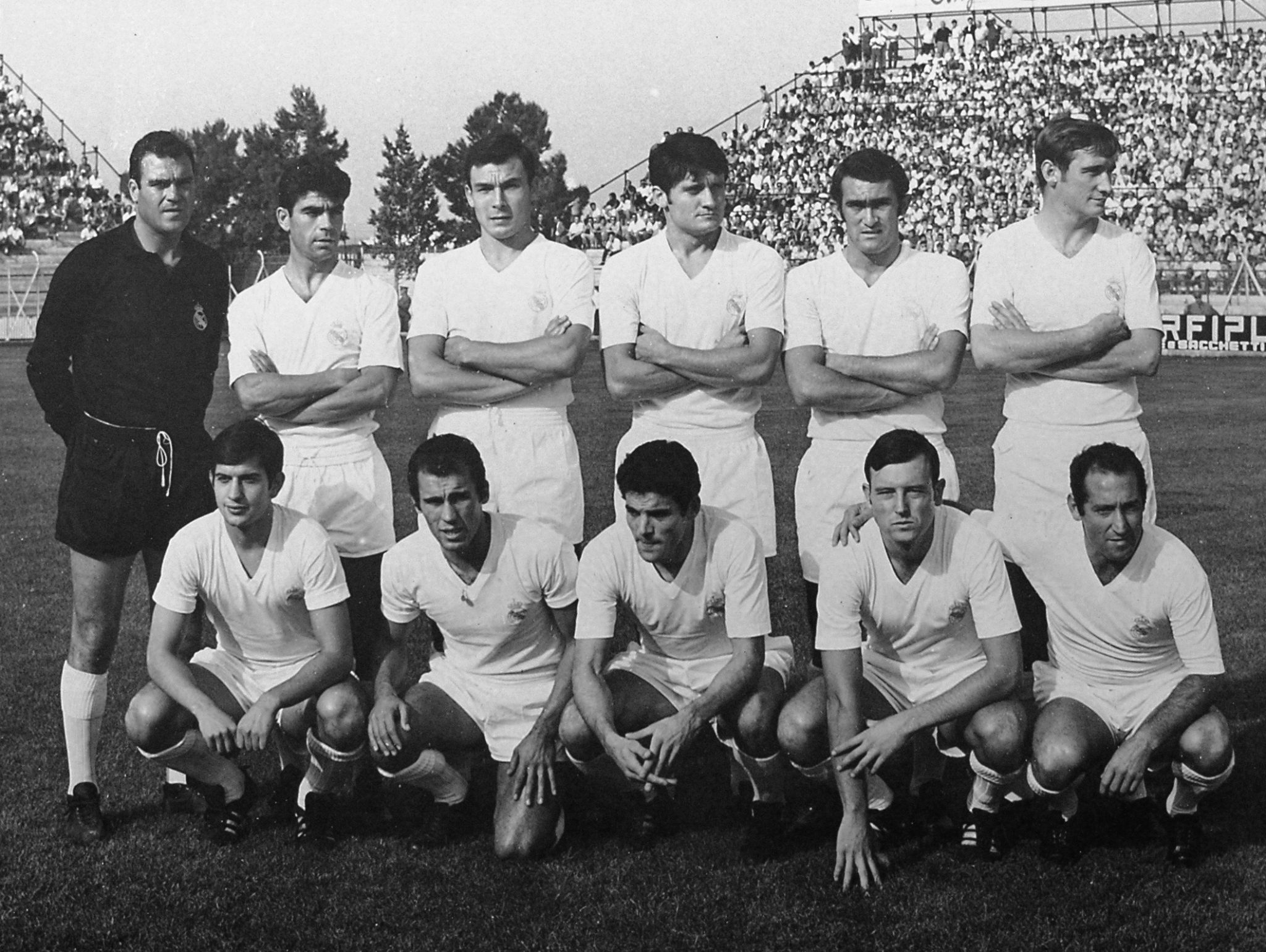
- 1968–69 Real Madrid team
- Season: 1968–69
- Champions: Real Madrid (14th title)
- Relegated: Málaga; Español; Córdoba
- European Cup: Real Madrid
- Cup Winners' Cup: Atlético Bilbao
- Matches: 240
- Goals: 561 (2.34 per match)
- Top goalscorer: Amancio; José Eulogio Gárate (14 goals each)
- Biggest home win: Zaragoza 6–0 Granada
- Biggest away win: Málaga 0–3 Barcelona
- Highest scoring: Atlético Madrid 4–4 Atlético Bilbao; Real Madrid 5–3 Sabadell

The 1968–69 La Liga was the 38th season since its establishment. The season began on 14 September 1968, and concluded on 20 April 1969.

== Competition format ==
The relegation playoffs were disestablished and the three last qualified teams were directly relegated to Segunda División.

== Team locations ==
Location of teams in 1968–69 La Liga
Canary Islands

Team	Home city	Stadium
Atlético Bilbao	Bilbao	San Mamés
Atlético Madrid	Madrid	Vicente Calderón
Barcelona	Barcelona	Nou Camp
Córdoba	Córdoba	El Arcángel
Deportivo La Coruña	A Coruña	Riazor
Elche	Elche	Altabix
Español	Barcelona	Sarrià
Granada	Granada	Los Cármenes
Las Palmas	Las Palmas	Insular
Málaga	Málaga	La Rosaleda
Pontevedra	Pontevedra	Pasarón
Real Madrid	Madrid	Santiago Bernabéu
Real Sociedad	San Sebastián	Atocha
Sabadell	Sabadell	Creu Alta
Valencia	Valencia	Mestalla
Zaragoza	Zaragoza	La Romareda

== League table ==
Pos	Team	Pld	W	D	L	GF	GA	GD	Pts	Qualification or relegation
1	Real Madrid (C)	30	18	11	1	46	21	+25	47	Qualification for the European Cup first round
2	Las Palmas	30	15	8	7	45	34	+11	38	Invited for the Inter-Cities Fairs Cup
3	Barcelona	30	13	10	7	40	18	+22	36	Invited for the Inter-Cities Fairs Cup
4	Sabadell	30	10	12	8	33	34	−1	32	Invited for the Inter-Cities Fairs Cup
5	Valencia	30	10	11	9	36	39	−3	31	Invited for the Inter-Cities Fairs Cup
6	Atlético Madrid	30	10	10	10	40	37	+3	30	
7	Real Sociedad	30	10	9	11	36	33	+3	29	
8	Granada	30	11	7	12	26	38	−12	29	
9	Elche	30	7	15	8	25	23	+2	29	
10	Deportivo La Coruña	30	11	6	13	39	44	−5	28	
11	Atlético Bilbao	30	10	8	12	42	46	−4	28	Qualification for the Cup Winners' Cup first round (Note: Atlético Bilbao qualified to the Cup Winners' Cup as champions of the Copa del Generalísimo.)
12	Pontevedra	30	7	13	10	20	23	−3	27	
13	Zaragoza	30	8	10	12	36	36	0	26	
14	Málaga (R)	30	9	7	14	37	42	−5	25	Relegation to the Segunda División
15	Español (R)	30	8	8	14	29	36	−7	24	Relegation to the Segunda División
16	Córdoba (R)	30	5	11	14	31	57	−26	21	Relegation to the Segunda División

Source: BDFútbol
Rules for classification: 1) Points; 2) Head-to-head results; 3) Goal difference; 4) Number of goals scored
(C) Champions; (R) Relegated

== Results ==
Home \ Away	ATB	ATM	BAR	CÓR	DEP	ELC	ESP	GRA	LPA	MÁL	PON	RMA	RSO	SAB	VAL	ZAR
Atlético Bilbao	—	0–2	1–1	3–0	2–3	1–1	1–0	4–2	2–1	4–3	2–2	0–1	3–1	2–1	1–2	3–0
Atlético Madrid	4–4	—	0–1	1–2	5–1	0–0	1–0	1–0	1–1	4–1	1–0	0–1	1–0	2–2	2–2	1–0
CF Barcelona	0–1	4–1	—	4–0	4–1	1–1	1–0	4–0	1–2	1–0	1–0	1–1	0–0	2–0	1–1	4–0
Córdoba CF	1–1	0–3	2–1	—	0–0	0–0	5–0	1–1	3–4	2–2	3–1	2–2	1–1	0–1	2–0	0–1
Deportivo de La Coruña	1–0	3–1	1–0	1–0	—	4–2	1–1	4–0	2–0	2–0	2–0	2–4	1–1	1–1	1–2	0–1
Elche CF	1–1	2–2	1–2	4–1	2–0	—	1–0	0–1	0–0	0–0	0–0	1–0	0–0	3–0	0–0	0–0
RCD Español	2–0	3–2	0–0	3–0	4–0	1–1	—	0–0	1–2	2–1	2–1	1–1	1–0	1–1	0–1	3–1
Granada CF	1–0	2–0	1–0	3–0	1–0	1–0	1–0	—	2–2	2–0	0–0	0–0	0–0	0–1	3–0	1–0
UD Las Palmas	1–1	2–1	0–0	4–0	2–1	1–1	1–0	1–0	—	3–1	1–0	0–1	4–0	3–1	2–1	2–1
CD Málaga	4–0	0–0	0–3	1–1	3–1	1–0	4–0	0–0	2–0	—	2–1	1–2	1–0	4–2	4–1	1–1
Pontevedra CF	1–0	0–0	0–1	0–0	0–0	0–1	1–0	1–0	3–0	1–0	—	0–0	1–0	0–0	2–0	0–0
Real Madrid	2–1	0–0	2–1	2–0	2–1	1–1	3–1	2–1	2–0	2–0	2–2	—	2–1	5–3	0–0	2–0
Real Sociedad	2–0	2–2	2–1	5–1	1–3	1–0	2–1	5–1	1–0	1–0	0–0	0–2	—	1–1	4–0	2–1
CE Sabadell FC	1–1	0–1	0–0	4–0	0–0	3–0	1–0	2–1	1–1	2–1	1–1	0–0	1–0	—	2–1	1–0
Valencia CF	5–1	2–1	0–0	2–2	2–1	1–0	2–2	4–1	2–2	0–0	2–0	0–1	2–1	0–0	—	0–0
Zaragoza	0–2	2–0	0–0	2–2	3–1	0–2	0–0	6–0	2–3	4–0	2–2	1–1	2–2	3–0	3–1	—

Source: BDFútbol
Legend: Blue = home team win; Yellow = draw; Red = away team win.

== Pichichi Trophy ==
Rank	Player	Club	Goals
1	(Spain) Amancio	Real Madrid	14
1	(Spain) José Eulogio Gárate	Atlético Madrid	14
3	(Paraguay) Sebastián Fleitas	Málaga	13
4	(Spain) José Manuel León	Las Palmas	11
4	(Spain) Antonio Eduardo López Beci	Deportivo La Coruña	11
4	(Spain) José Antonio Zaldúa	Barcelona	11
