= Elías Romero (footballer, born 2004) =

Spanish footballer

Personal information
- Full name: Elías Romero Martínez
- Date of birth: 11 May 2004 (age 22)
- Place of birth: Almería, Spain
- Height: 1.79 m (5 ft 10 in)
- Position: Forward

Team information
- Current team: Las Palmas
- Number: 29

Youth career
- Aguadulce
- 2013–2018: Atlético Gran Canaria
- 2018–2024: Las Palmas

Senior career*
Years	Team	Apps	(Gls)
2023–2024	Las Palmas C	1	(0)
2023–	Las Palmas B	59	(26)
2026–	Las Palmas	1	(0)
- * Club domestic league appearances and goals as of 16 August 2026

Elías Romero Martínez (born 11 May 2004) is a Spanish footballer who plays for UD Las Palmas. Mainly a forward, he can also play as a winger.

== Career ==
Born in Almería, Andalusia, Romero began his career with local side Aguadulce CF before moving to the Canary Islands at the age of nine with his parents. There, he represented Atlético Gran Canaria before joining the youth categories of UD Las Palmas in 2018.

In 2023, Romero began appearing with the reserves in Tercera Federación, but only became a regular starter in the 2024–25 season, scoring 16 goals as the side achieved promotion to Segunda Federación. He continued his goalscoring form in the following campaign, being again the B's top scorer.

In June 2026, Romero was promoted to the first team for the pre-season, and made his professional debut on 16 August, coming on as a late substitute for Manu Fuster and providing the assist to Sandro Ramírez's winner in a 2–1 Segunda División home success over Albacete Balompié.
