= Cacho (footballer, born 2002) =

Spanish footballer (born 2002)

Personal information
- Full name: Airam Guzmán Castillo
- Date of birth: 31 July 2002 (age 24)
- Place of birth: Santa Cruz de La Palma, Canarias
- Height: 1.66 m (5 ft 5 in)
- Position: Winger

Team information
- Current team: Las Palmas Atlético
- Number: 15

Youth career
- Mensajero
- 2018–2019: Las Palmas

Senior career*
Years	Team	Apps	(Gls)
2018	Mensajero	2	(0)
2019–2022	Mensajero	47	(2)
2022–2025	Tenerife B	75	(13)
2023–2025	Tenerife	3	(0)
2025–2026	Puente Genil	15	(1)
2026–	Las Palmas Atlético	14	(0)
- * Club domestic league appearances and goals as of 16 May 2026

Airam Guzmán Castillo (born 31 July 2002), commonly known as Cacho, is a Spanish footballer who plays as a winger for Segunda Federación club Las Palmas Atlético.

== Club career ==
Born in Santa Cruz de La Palma, La Palma, Canary Islands, Cacho was a CD Mensajero youth graduate. He made his first team debut on 23 September 2018, coming on as a second-half substitute in a 2–2 Tercera División away draw against Atlético Tacoronte.

On 17 November 2018, Cacho moved to UD Las Palmas and returned to the youth setup. He returned to Mensa in the following year, and started to feature more regularly until renewing his contract with the club on 5 July 2021.

On 20 July 2022, Cacho signed for CD Tenerife and was initially assigned to the reserves in Tercera Federación. He made his professional debut the following 25 March, replacing Aitor Sanz late into a 1–0 Segunda División away loss against Deportivo Alavés; by doing so, he became the first player from his native island to play for the main squad since 1989.
