= Diego Martín (Spanish footballer) =

Spanish footballer

Personal information
- Full name: Diego Martín Pérez
- Date of birth: 13 August 2003 (age 23)
- Place of birth: Los Llanos de Aridane, Spain
- Positions: Left-back; winger

Team information
- Current team: Las Palmas B
- Number: 3

Youth career
- Los Llanos
- Atlético Paso
- Argual
- Breña
- 2019–2020: Los Llanos
- 2020–2022: Las Palmas

Senior career*
Years	Team	Apps	(Gls)
2022–2023	Las Palmas C	22	(13)
2023–	Las Palmas B	87	(11)
2025–	Las Palmas	1	(0)
- * Club domestic league appearances and goals as of 16 May 2026

Diego Martín Pérez (born 13 August 2003) is a Spanish professional footballer who plays as either a left-back or a left winger for UD Las Palmas Atlético.

== Career ==
Martín was born in Los Llanos de Aridane, Santa Cruz de Tenerife, Canary Islands, and represented UD Los Llanos de Aridane (two stints), CD Atlético Paso, CD Argual and Breña CF as a youth before joining UD Las Palmas in 2020. In July 2022, after finishing his formation, he renewed his contract with the club and was assigned to the C-team in the Interinsular Preferente.

Martín scored 13 goals with the C's in the 2022–23 season before starting to feature with the reserves, and would later become a regular starter for the side. He made his first team – and La Liga – debut on 18 May 2025, coming on as a late substitute for fellow youth graduate Alberto Moleiro in a 1–0 home loss to CD Leganés, as the club was already relegated.
