= Josito González =

Spanish footballer

Personal information
- Full name: José Carlos González Sánchez
- Date of birth: 27 March 2006 (age 20)
- Place of birth: Caracas, Venezuela
- Position: Midfielder

Team information
- Current team: Las Palmas B
- Number: 27

Youth career
- Marino
- 2023–2025: Las Palmas

Senior career*
Years	Team	Apps	(Gls)
2024–2026	Las Palmas C	22	(3)
2025–	Las Palmas	1	(0)
2025–	Las Palmas B	12	(0)
- * Club domestic league appearances and goals as of 31 May 2026

José Carlos González Sánchez (born 27 March 2006), known as Josito González or just Josito, is a Venezuelan professional footballer who plays as a midfielder for Spanish club UD Las Palmas Atlético.

== Career ==
Born in Venezuela, Josito moved to Spain at early age, and joined UD Las Palmas' youth sides in 2023, from CD Marino. He made his senior debut with the C-team in the 2024–25 season, helping the side to achieve promotion from the Interinsular Preferente; he notably scored a goal for the C's in a 6–0 home routing over UD San Fernando B.

On 24 May 2025, before even having appeared for the reserves, Josito made his first team – and La Liga – debut, coming on as a late substitute for fellow youth graduate Juanma Herzog in a 2–0 away loss to RCD Espanyol, as the club was already relegated.
