= Javier Vidales =

Spanish football coach (born 1965)

Personal information
- Full name: Francisco Javier Rodríguez Vidales
- Date of birth: 14 September 1965 (age 61)
- Place of birth: Astorga, Spain

Youth career
- Years: Team
- Sporting Gijón

Managerial career
- 1997–1999: Sporting B
- 1999–2000: Gimnástica Segoviana
- 2001: Langreo
- 2002–2003: Lugo
- 2003–2004: Pájara Playas
- 2004–2006: Vecindario
- 2008–2009: Las Palmas
- 2010–2011: Sporting B

Francisco Javier Rodríguez Vidales (born 14 September 1965) is a Spanish football coach.

== Football career ==
Born in Astorga, Province of León, Vidales was in the youth ranks of Sporting de Gijón but never played senior football. He became manager of their reserve team in 1997 and the following year was assistant in the first team to Antonio López Habas.

Vidales spent most of his career with teams in Segunda División B. In October 2005, he was dismissed by UD Vecindario, who finished the season with promotion under his successor Pacuco Rosales.

Remaining in the Canary Islands, Vidales replaced Juan Manuel Rodríguez as manager of UD Las Palmas on 3 December 2008. Three days later on his professional debut in Segunda División, the team won 2–0 at home to RC Celta de Vigo. He finished the season in 16th, seven points above relegation, and was himself replaced by Paco Castellano.

On 5 January 2010, Vidales returned to Sporting's reserves. He left in May 2011, after their relegation to Tercera División; the team however avoided the drop by buying the place vacated by the withdrawal of Cultural y Deportiva Leonesa.
