= Arturo Rodríguez (footballer, born 2006) =

Spanish footballer

Personal information
- Full name: Arturo Rodríguez Cosano
- Date of birth: 5 August 2006 (age 20)
- Place of birth: Mataró, Spain
- Height: 1.78 m (5 ft 10 in)
- Position: Winger

Team information
- Current team: Las Palmas B
- Number: 17

Youth career
- Juventus Mataró
- Cirera
- Girona
- → Cirera (loan)
- → Mataró (loan)
- Damm
- 2023–2025: Las Palmas

Senior career*
Years	Team	Apps	(Gls)
2025–	Las Palmas	1	(0)
2025–	Las Palmas B	19	(1)

International career
2025–	Spain U19	1	(1)
- * Club domestic league appearances and goals as of 16 May 2026

Arturo Rodríguez Cosano (born 5 August 2006) is a Spanish professional footballer who plays mainly a right winger for UD Las Palmas Atlético.

== Club career ==
Born in Mataró, Barcelona, Catalonia, Rodríguez began his career with hometown side Juventus AC Mataró at the age of five. After playing for UD Cirera, he moved to Girona FC, but had loans back to Cirera and CE Mataró before signing for CF Damm.

Rodríguez moved to the youth sides of UD Las Palmas in 2023, initially for the Juvenil B squad. During the 2024–25 season, he scored 19 goals for the Juvenil A squad.

On 24 May 2025, before even having appeared for the reserves, Rodríguez made his first team – and La Liga – debut, coming on as a second-half substitute for Dário Essugo in a 2–0 away loss to RCD Espanyol, as the club was already relegated. Two days later, he renewed his contract with the club, being promoted to the B-side.

== International career ==
On 12 January 2025, Rodríguez was called up to the Spain national under-19 team for a friendly against Italy. He made his debut three days later, scoring the winner in the 1–0 success.
