= 1971–72 La Liga =

41st season of La Liga

Primera División
- Season: 1971–72
- Champions: Real Madrid (15th title)
- Relegated: Sevilla; Córdoba; Sabadell
- European Cup: Real Madrid
- Cup Winners' Cup: Atlético Madrid
- UEFA Cup: Valencia; Barcelona; Las Palmas
- Matches: 306
- Goals: 675 (2.21 per match)
- Top goalscorer: Enrique Porta (20 goals)
- Biggest home win: Real Sociedad 6–0 Real Betis
- Biggest away win: Córdoba 0–4 Valencia

The 1971–72 La Liga was the 41st season since its establishment. The season began on 4 September 1971, and concluded on 14 May 1972. It was played by 18 clubs after the expansion from the previous season.

== Team locations ==
Location of teams in La Liga 1971–72
Canary Islands

Team	Home city	Stadium
Athletic Bilbao	Bilbao	San Mamés
Atlético Madrid	Madrid	Vicente Calderón
Barcelona	Barcelona	Nou Camp
Burgos	Burgos	El Plantío
Celta	Vigo	Balaídos
Córdoba	Córdoba	El Arcángel
Deportivo La Coruña	A Coruña	Riazor
Español	Barcelona	Sarriá
Granada	Granada	Los Cármenes
Las Palmas	Las Palmas	Insular
Málaga	Málaga	La Rosaleda
Real Betis	Seville	Benito Villamarín
Real Madrid	Madrid	Santiago Bernabéu
Real Sociedad	San Sebastián	Atocha
Sabadell	Sabadell	Creu Alta
Sevilla	Seville	Ramón Sánchez Pizjuán
Sporting Gijón	Gijón	El Molinón
Valencia	Valencia	Luis Casanova

== League table ==
Pos	Team	Pld	W	D	L	GF	GA	GD	Pts	Qualification or relegation
1	Real Madrid (C)	34	19	9	6	51	27	+24	47	Qualification for the European Cup first round
2	Valencia	34	19	7	8	53	30	+23	45	Qualification for the UEFA Cup first round
3	Barcelona	34	17	9	8	40	26	+14	43	Qualification for the UEFA Cup first round
4	Atlético Madrid	34	14	11	9	45	28	+17	39	Qualification for the Cup Winners' Cup first round (Note: Atlético Madrid qualified to the Cup Winners' Cup as champions of the Copa del Generalísimo.)
5	Las Palmas	34	15	8	11	40	36	+4	38	Qualification for the UEFA Cup first round
6	Granada	34	14	8	12	40	34	+6	36	
7	Málaga	34	9	17	8	27	31	−4	35	
8	Real Sociedad	34	14	6	14	38	36	+2	34	
9	Athletic Bilbao	34	15	4	15	39	32	+7	34	
10	Celta Vigo	34	10	13	11	37	42	−5	33	
11	Sporting Gijón	34	12	8	14	41	37	+4	32	
12	Español	34	12	8	14	43	43	0	32	
13	Real Betis	34	10	10	14	25	45	−20	30	
14	Deportivo La Coruña	34	11	8	15	28	38	−10	30	
15	Burgos	34	11	7	16	34	42	−8	29	
16	Sevilla (R)	34	9	9	16	35	45	−10	27	Relegation to the Segunda División
17	Sabadell (R)	34	6	13	15	32	51	−19	25	Relegation to the Segunda División
18	Córdoba (R)	34	7	9	18	27	52	−25	23	Relegation to the Segunda División

Source: BDFútbol
Rules for classification: 1) Points; 2) Head-to-head results; 3) Goal difference; 4) Number of goals scored
(C) Champions; (R) Relegated

== Results ==
Home \ Away	ATB	ATM	BAR	BET	BUR	CEL	CÓR	DEP	ESP	GRA	LPA	MLG	RGI	RMA	RSO	SAB	SEV	VAL
Atlético Bilbao		0–1	0–1	3–0	1–0	4–0	5–0	1–0	1–1	1–0	1–2	0–0	3–1	1–0	1–2	3–1	2–0	1–1
Atlético Madrid	1–2		1–1	4–1	1–0	0–0	2–2	2–1	1–1	1–0	2–0	0–0	1–0	4–1	5–0	5–0	0–2	0–1
CF Barcelona	0–1	0–0		2–2	2–1	1–0	4–1	1–0	2–0	2–0	1–2	0–1	1–0	1–0	3–0	2–0	1–0	1–1
Betis	1–0	1–3	0–0		2–0	1–1	0–0	2–0	0–1	1–0	2–1	0–0	2–1	0–0	1–0	1–0	1–1	1–0
Burgos	1–0	0–0	2–3	0–1		3–2	1–0	3–1	2–1	1–1	1–0	3–1	1–0	1–2	3–1	4–1	1–0	0–1
Celta de Vigo	2–0	2–1	1–2	1–0	2–0		2–0	3–1	4–2	0–0	2–0	1–1	2–2	1–1	0–1	0–1	4–1	1–3
Córdoba CF	0–1	0–1	1–0	3–1	0–0	0–0		0–0	3–1	2–0	2–2	0–0	0–1	2–2	1–0	4–1	1–1	0–4
Deportivo de La Coruña	1–0	1–1	0–2	1–1	0–0	0–1	3–2		3–1	2–0	1–0	0–0	1–1	1–0	1–0	1–0	1–0	3–0
RCD Español	1–2	1–2	3–0	3–0	1–1	1–0	1–1	2–0		2–3	4–0	4–1	0–0	0–0	1–0	2–1	2–0	3–1
Granada CF	5–1	1–0	2–0	0–0	2–1	0–0	1–0	2–2	0–0		3–0	2–0	1–0	2–1	1–0	3–1	3–0	1–0
UD Las Palmas	2–1	1–0	1–2	2–0	3–1	1–1	3–0	2–0	1–0	2–2		2–0	5–1	2–0	0–0	0–0	1–1	1–1
CD Málaga	1–0	0–0	0–0	0–0	4–1	1–1	2–2	2–0	1–0	1–0	0–0		1–1	1–1	1–1	1–0	2–2	0–2
Real Gijón	3–2	1–2	1–0	3–1	0–0	2–2	0–0	2–0	4–0	2–0	0–1	1–2		1–1	1–0	3–0	1–0	4–0
Real Madrid	1–0	1–0	1–1	2–0	1–1	3–0	4–1	1–0	3–0	4–2	2–0	1–0	1–0		2–1	2–0	4–1	1–1
Real Sociedad	1–0	0–0	2–2	6–0	2–0	0–0	2–1	0–1	4–1	3–1	1–0	1–0	3–1	0–2		2–0	1–1	1–0
CE Sabadell FC	0–0	3–1	0–0	2–1	2–1	1–1	1–0	4–1	0–2	0–0	0–1	1–1	0–2	1–2	3–1		0–0	1–1
Sevilla CF	0–1	3–3	1–2	3–1	2–0	4–0	1–1	1–0	1–0	2–1	0–2	1–2	3–1	0–2	0–1	1–1		2–0
Valencia CF	2–0	1–0	1–0	2–0	2–0	4–0	4–2	1–1	1–1	2–1	4–0	3–0	1–0	1–2	2–1	3–1	2–0	

Legend: Blue = home team win; Yellow = draw; Red = away team win.

== Pichichi Trophy ==
Rank	Player	Club	Goals
1	(Spain) Enrique Porta	Granada	20
2	(Spain) Germán Dévora	Las Palmas	15
3	(Spain) Juan María Amiano	Espanyol	14
4	(Spain) Joaquín Sierra Gallego	Valencia	13
5	(Paraguay) Bernardo Acosta	Sevilla	12
5	(Spain) Fernando Ansola	Real Sociedad	12
5	(Spain) Fidel Uriarte	Atlético Bilbao	12
8	(Spain) Luis Aragonés	Atlético Madrid	11
8	(Spain) Pirri	Real Madrid	11
