= Enrique Porta =

Spanish footballer

Enrique Porta Guíu (born 17 December 1944) is a Spanish retired footballer who played as a striker.

He amassed La Liga totals of 122 matches and 40 goals across nine seasons with Granada and Zaragoza, winning the Pichichi Trophy with the former club.

== Club career ==
Born in Villanueva de Gállego, Province of Zaragoza, Porta began his career in his native region of Aragon, spending the 1967–68 season with SD Huesca in the Tercera División and scoring 34 goals. Subsequently, he signed for Granada CF in La Liga.

In his first three seasons, Porta played only 12 games in total, scoring once – the only goal in a home win over RCD Español on 20 September 1970. In the 1971–72 campaign, however, his 20 goals in 31 matches – no penalties – earned him the Pichichi Trophy for the league's top scorer to help the Andalusians to a best ever sixth position; this included a hat-trick in a 3–1 victory against CE Sabadell on 14 November 1971, as he became the first and only Granada player to win the award.

Porta scored 11 times in 1972–73, including another treble in a 4–0 win over Real Oviedo on 11 February 1973. From 1973 to 1975, he found the net only once.

In the summer of 1975, Porta moved to fellow league side Real Zaragoza. Following their relegation in his second year, he left for Segunda División team Terrassa FC, scoring five goals from 28 appearances in his final season as a professional.

== Recognition ==
In May 2015, the main entrance to Granada's Estadio Nuevo Los Cármenes was named after Porta. The stadium of Villanueva CF, from his hometown, is also named after him.
