= Matías Pezzolesi =

Argentine footballer

Personal information
- Full name: Matías Oscar Pezzolesi
- Date of birth: 20 November 2002 (age 23)
- Place of birth: Santa Cruz de Tenerife, Spain
- Height: 1.84 m (6 ft 0 in)
- Position: Centre-back

Team information
- Current team: Atlético Paso

Youth career
- Marino
- Guargacho
- Barracas Central
- Águilas San Aquilino
- Las Palmas

Senior career*
| Years | Team | Apps | (Gls) |
| 2021–2023 | Buzanada | | |
| 2023–2025 | Tenerife B | 53 | (0) |
| 2024–2025 | Tenerife | 1 | (0) |
| 2025– | Atlético Paso | 0 | (0) |
- * Club domestic league appearances and goals as of 27 April 2025

Matías Oscar Pezzolesi (born 20 November 2002) is an Argentine footballer who plays as a centre-back for Spanish club CD Atlético Paso.

== Career ==
Born in Santa Cruz de Tenerife to Argentine parents, Pezzolesi began his career with CD Marino, and played for UD Guargacho before moving to Buenos Aires, where he represented Barracas Central. Back to the Canary Islands, he played for CD Águilas de San Aquilino and UD Las Palmas before moving to Tercera División RFEF side CD Buzanada in 2021.

In August 2023, Pezzolesi moved to CD Tenerife and was initially assigned to the reserves also in the fifth division. He made his first team debut on 19 October of the following year, coming on as a second-half substitute for Aarón Martín in a 4–0 Segunda División away loss to Granada CF.

On 20 July 2025, Pezzolesi moved to CD Atlético Paso in the fifth tier.

== Personal life ==
Pezzolesi's younger brother Valentín is also a footballer. A right-back, he also represented the youth sides of Las Palmas.

Pezzolesi is eligible to represent either Spain, Argentina or Italy.
