= Juan Manuel Rodríguez (football manager) =

Spanish football manager

- Rodríguez in 2012

Personal information
- Full name: Juan Manuel Rodríguez Pérez
- Date of birth: 16 December 1958 (age 67)
- Place of birth: Las Palmas, Spain
- Positions: Right-back; winger

Team information
- Current team: Las Palmas B (manager)

Youth career
- Minerva
- Arenales
- La Salle

Senior career*
Years	Team	Apps	(Gls)
- San Antonio

Managerial career
- 1975–19XX: Arenales (youth)
- RACSA (youth)
- Unión Risco
- Villa Santa Brígida (youth)
- Telde (youth)
- Real Artesano (youth)
- 1985–1988: Real Artesano
- 1988–1989: Arguineguín
- 1989–1990: Las Palmas (youth)
- 1990–1991: Vecindario
- 1991–1992: Aridane
- 1992–1993: Arguineguín
- 1993–1995: Vecindario
- 1995–1996: Las Palmas B
- 1996: Realejos
- 1997–2000: Lanzarote
- 2002–2003: Vecindario
- 2003: Las Palmas
- 2004–2007: Villa Santa Brígida
- 2007–2008: Las Palmas
- 2011–2012: Las Palmas
- 2017–2022: Las Palmas B
- 2026–: Las Palmas B
- 2026: Las Palmas (caretaker)
- * Club domestic league appearances and goals

Juan Manuel Rodríguez Pérez (born 16 December 1958) is a Spanish football manager, currently the manager of UD Las Palmas Atlético.

== Managerial career ==
Rodríguez was born in Las Palmas, Canary Islands, and began his managerial career with CD Arguineguín after his footballing career was cut short due to injury. He rotated through clubs in his native regions for the following campaigns, and in 1995 was appointed manager of UD Las Palmas Atlético, being also an assistant at the main squad.

After suffering team relegation from Segunda División B with UD Realejos in 1997, Rodríguez spent three full campaigns at UD Lanzarote, being promoted from Tercera División in his second. He left the latter in 2000, and only returned to the bench two years later, taking over UD Vecindario and being champion of its group.

On 1 July 2003, Rodríguez returned to Las Palmas, now as manager of the first team in Segunda División. He was relieved from his duties in December, after only winning three matches out of 16.

In the 2004 summer Rodríguez was named at the helm of UD Villa de Santa Brígida, taking the club to the third level at the end of the 2006–07 campaign. On 28 October 2007, he went back to the UD for a third spell, being sacked on 3 December of the following year.

On 27 February 2011, Rodríguez was again appointed manager of Las Palmas, replacing fired Paco Jémez. After narrowly avoiding relegation he renewed his link, and after a final 9th position in the following season, he left the club.

Rodríguez then started a social project with Las Palmas, creating a team named Las Palmas D, before returning to managerial duties in November 2017, after taking over the club's B-team. He resigned on 13 January 2022, but remained linked with the club after working in their Training and Recruitment Department.

On 20 April 2026, Rodríguez was again appointed manager of Las Palmas Atlético. On 12 October, he was named in charge of the first team in a caretaker basis, replacing sacked Rubén de la Barrera, returning to his previous role late in the month after the appointment of Albert Sánchez.

== Managerial statistics ==
As of 27 October 2026

Managerial record by team and tenure
Team	Nat	From	To	Record								Ref
Team	Nat	From	To	G	W	D	L	GF	GA	GD	Win %	Ref
Arguineguín	(Spain)	1 July 1988	23 June 1989	44	18	5	21	65	75	−10	40.91	
Vecindario	(Spain)	1 July 1990	30 June 1991	38	14	10	14	35	49	−14	36.84	
Aridane	(Spain)	30 June 1991	1 July 1992	38	13	8	17	49	47	+2	34.21	
Arguineguín	(Spain)	1 July 1992	28 June 1993	38	13	13	12	42	46	−4	34.21	
Vecindario	(Spain)	28 June 1993	1 July 1995	76	28	26	22	97	81	+16	36.84	
Las Palmas Atlético	(Spain)	1 July 1995	3 July 1996	46	23	13	10	85	38	+47	50.00	
Realejos	(Spain)	20 October 1996	2 December 1996	6	1	2	3	2	10	−8	16.67	
Lanzarote	(Spain)	1 July 1997	30 June 2000	133	58	39	36	187	134	+53	43.61	
Vecindario	(Spain)	10 June 2002	1 July 2003	46	29	8	9	85	31	+54	63.04	
Las Palmas	(Spain)	1 July 2003	14 December 2003	17	3	8	6	20	25	−5	17.65	
Villa Santa Brígida	(Spain)	1 July 2004	28 October 2007	130	55	48	27	178	119	+59	42.31	
Las Palmas	(Spain)	28 October 2007	3 December 2008	49	17	16	16	65	62	+3	34.69	
Las Palmas	(Spain)	27 February 2011	6 June 2012	59	24	14	21	79	79	+0	40.68	
Las Palmas Atlético	(Spain)	8 November 2017	13 January 2022	134	45	42	47	128	140	−12	33.58	
Las Palmas Atlético	(Spain)	20 April 2026	present	8	2	3	3	5	11	−6	25.00	
Las Palmas (caretaker)	(Spain)	12 October 2026	29 October 2026	3	2	0	1	4	4	+0	66.67	
Total				865	345	255	265	1,126	951	+175	39.88	—
