= Valentín Pezzolesi =

Argentine footballer

Personal information
- Full name: Valentín Alejandro Pezzolesi
- Date of birth: 16 April 2007 (age 19)
- Place of birth: Santa Cruz de Tenerife, Spain
- Height: 1.80 m (5 ft 11 in)
- Position: Right-back

Team information
- Current team: Las Palmas
- Number: 25

Youth career
- Marino
- San Telmo
- Tenerife
- 2022–2024: Las Palmas

Senior career*
| Years | Team | Apps | (Gls) |
| 2024–2026 | Las Palmas B | 26 | (1) |
| 2024– | Las Palmas | 8 | (0) |

International career
| 2025– | Spain U19 | 1 | (0) |
- * Club domestic league appearances and goals as of 29 August 2026

Valentín Alejandro Pezzolesi (born 16 April 2007) is a Spanish footballer who plays as a right-back for UD Las Palmas.

== Club career ==
Born in Santa Cruz de Tenerife to Argentine parents, Pezzolesi began his career with CD Marino before moving to Buenos Aires, where he represented Club Atlético San Telmo. Back to the Canary Islands, he played for CD Tenerife before moving to UD Las Palmas in 2022.

Pezzolesi was called up to the 2024 pre-season with the first team by manager Luis Carrión, but was subsequently assigned to the reserves in Tercera Federación. He made his senior debut with the B's on 6 September of that year, starting in a 2–0 away win over Estrella CF.

Pezzolesi made his debut with the main squad on 31 October 2024, playing the full 90 minutes in a 7–0 away routing of Ontiñena CF; aged 17 years, six months and 16 days, he became the seventh-youngest player to debut for the club. He made his professional – and La Liga – debut the following 22 February, coming on as a late substitute for Viti in a 2–0 home loss to FC Barcelona, and became the youngest player to feature with the Amarillos in the top tier.

On 1 September 2026, Pezzolesi renewed his contract with Las Palmas until 2031, being definitely promoted to the main squad.

== International career ==
Eligible to represent either Spain, Argentina or Italy, Pezzolesi appeared with the former's under-19 team on 5 September 2025, in a friendly match against England.

== Personal life ==
Pezzolesi's older brother Matías is also a footballer. A centre-back, he also represented the youth sides of Las Palmas.
