= Sergio Viera =

Spanish footballer

Personal information
- Full name: Sergio Viera García
- Date of birth: 8 May 2005 (age 21)
- Place of birth: Los Realejos, Spain
- Height: 1.78 m (5 ft 10 in)
- Position: Midfielder

Team information
- Current team: Las Palmas B
- Number: 16

Youth career
- Vera
- Cruz Santa
- Longuera Toscal
- Tenerife
- 2021–2024: Las Palmas

Senior career*
Years	Team	Apps	(Gls)
2024–	Las Palmas B	33	(1)
2024–	Las Palmas	1	(0)
- * Club domestic league appearances and goals as of 16 May 2026

Sergio Viera García (born 8 May 2005) is a Spanish professional footballer who plays as a midfielder for UD Las Palmas Atlético.

== Career ==
Born in Cruz Santa, Los Realejos, Santa Cruz de Tenerife, Canary Islands, Viera began his career with CD Vera, and joined UD Las Palmas' youth sides in 2021, after representing CD Tenerife, UD Longuera Toscal and UD Cruz Santa. He made his senior debut with the reserves on 15 September 2024, coming on as a late substitute in a 3–1 Tercera Federación home win over CF Unión Viera.

Viera made his first team debut on 31 October 2024, replacing Sandro Ramírez in a 7–0 away routing of Ontiñena CF, for the season's Copa del Rey. He scored his first senior goal on 10 November, netting the B's fourth in a 5–1 home win over San Bartolomé CF.

Viera made his professional – and La Liga – debut on 18 May 2025, replacing Viti Rozada in the second-half of a 1–0 home loss to CD Leganés, as the club was already relegated.
