= Adrián Rodríguez (footballer, born 2005) =

Spanish footballer

Personal information
- Full name: Adrián Rodríguez del Rosario
- Date of birth: 9 August 2005 (age 21)
- Place of birth: Ingenio, Spain
- Positions: Centre-back; left-back

Team information
- Current team: Las Palmas C
- Number: 5

Youth career
- Carrizal
- San Fernando
- 2019–2024: Las Palmas

Senior career*
Years	Team	Apps	(Gls)
2024–	Las Palmas C	48	(1)
2024–	Las Palmas B	3	(0)
2026–	Las Palmas	1	(0)
- * Club domestic league appearances and goals as of 4 October 2026

Adrián Rodríguez del Rosario (born 9 August 2005) is a Spanish professional footballer who plays as either a centre-back or a left-back for UD Las Palmas C.

== Career ==
Born in Carrizal de Ingenio, Ingenio, Las Palmas, Canary Islands, Rodríguez joined UD Las Palmas' youth categories in 2019, after representing UD San Fernando and CF Carrizal. He finished his formation in 2024, and subsequently became a regular starter of the C-team which achieved promotion to Tercera Federación.

Promoted to the reserves in Segunda Federación ahead of the 2025–26 season, Rodríguez was rarely used before returning to the C-team in January 2026. On 4 October, he made his professional debut with the main squad by coming on as a second-half substitute for Andrés Rodríguez in a 2–2 Segunda División home draw against Real Valladolid.
