= Indoor soccer =

Indoor sport derived from football

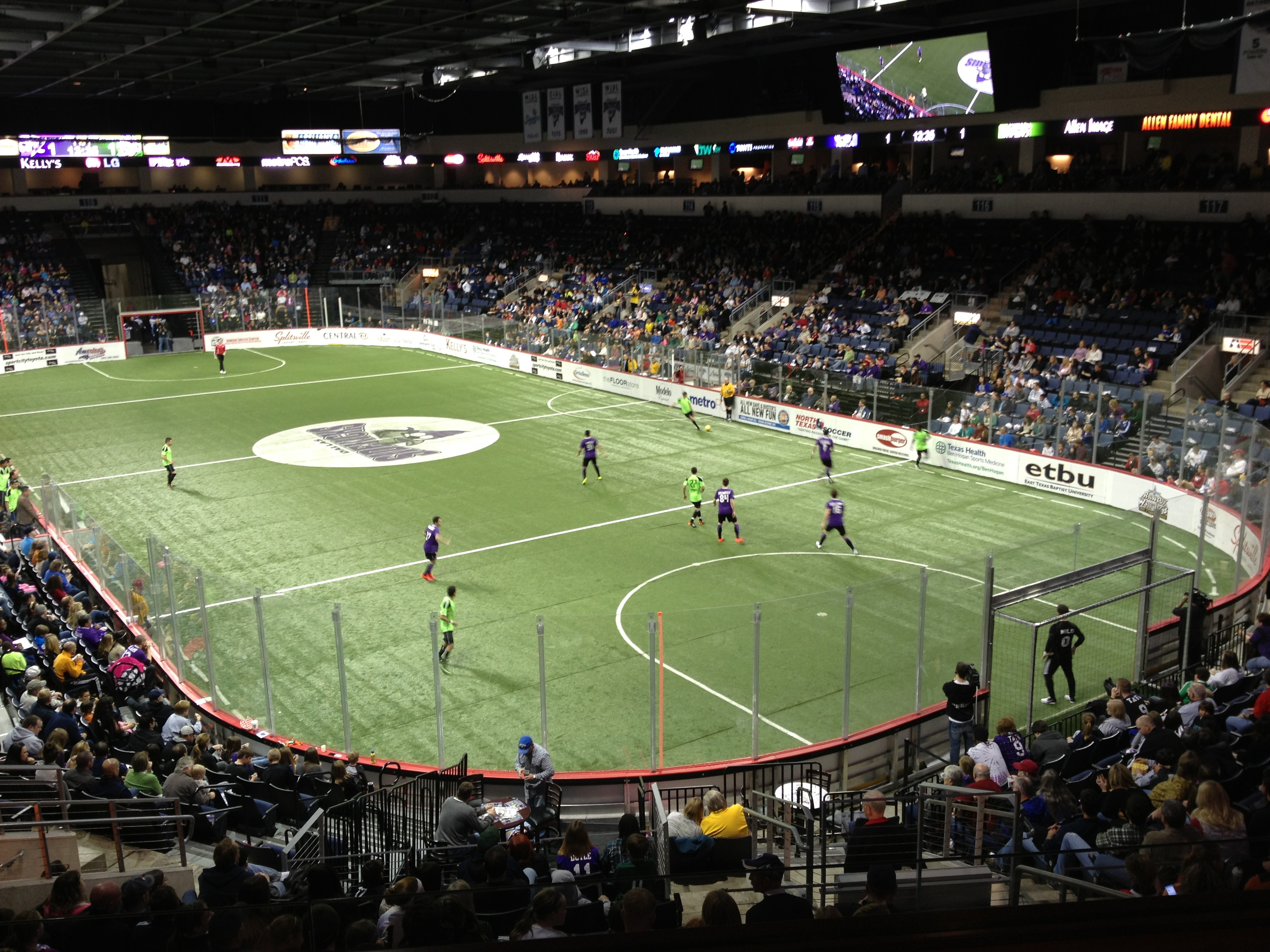
- 2013 match between the Dallas Sidekicks and Texas Strikers at Allen Event Center
- Highest governing body: World Minifootball Federation
- Nicknames: Indoor football

Characteristics
- Contact: Yes
- Team members: 5–7 per side (including goalkeeper)
- Type: team sport, ball sport
- Equipment: Football
- Venue: Indoor soccer field

Presence
- Olympic: No

Indoor soccer or arena soccer is a form of five-a-side or six-a-side version of minifootball. It is derived from association football and adapted to be played in walled hardcourt indoor arenas. It differs from the FIFA-sanctioned indoor football sport of futsal.

Indoor soccer, as it is most often known in the United States and Canada, was originally developed in these two countries as a way to play soccer during the winter months, when snow would make outdoor play difficult. In those countries, gymnasiums are adapted for indoor soccer play. In other countries, the game is played in either indoor or outdoor arenas surrounded by walls, and is referred to by different names (such as "fast football" (fútbol rápido) or "fútbol del muro" in Mexico, Futebol Society or showbol in Brazil, and "indoor football" (futbol indoor) in Spain).

Indoor soccer has different regulations from other versions of association football designed for indoor play, such as futsal and five-a-side football. Unlike futsal, which is played on wooden or ceramic surfaces, indoor soccer is played on synthetic turf (or, in the case of the British Masters Football variety, synthetic carpet). Indoor soccer courts are either delimited by walls or lines, and there are no player throw-ins.

FIFA, the body that oversees international association football competitions, does not sanction the synthetic turf version of indoor soccer, as it has developed its own code of indoor football (which they refer to as futsal).

Indoor soccer is most popular in the United States, Canada, and Mexico, with several amateur, collegiate and professional leagues functioning. While internationally less popular than futsal, indoor soccer is also played at the league level in many countries outside North America. The World Minifootball Federation (WMF) is the governing body of indoor soccer at the international level, having replaced the International Fast Football Federation (FIFRA).

The term minifootball, which was originally coined in Europe, has been adopted by the WMF as a standard international name for the sport.

== Around the world ==
=== International competitions ===
Indoor soccer is played throughout the world. Currently, the international federation dedicated to promoting the sport is the World Minifootball Federation (WMF) based in Switzerland. The WMF replaced the International Fast Football Federation (FIFRA), which had been based in Mexico and later, the United States. There are also regional federations who govern the sport including: African Minifootball Federation (AMF), Asian Minifootball Confederation (AMC), Confederación Panamericana de Minifútbol (CPM), European Minifootball Federation (EMF), Oceania Minifootball Federation (OMF).

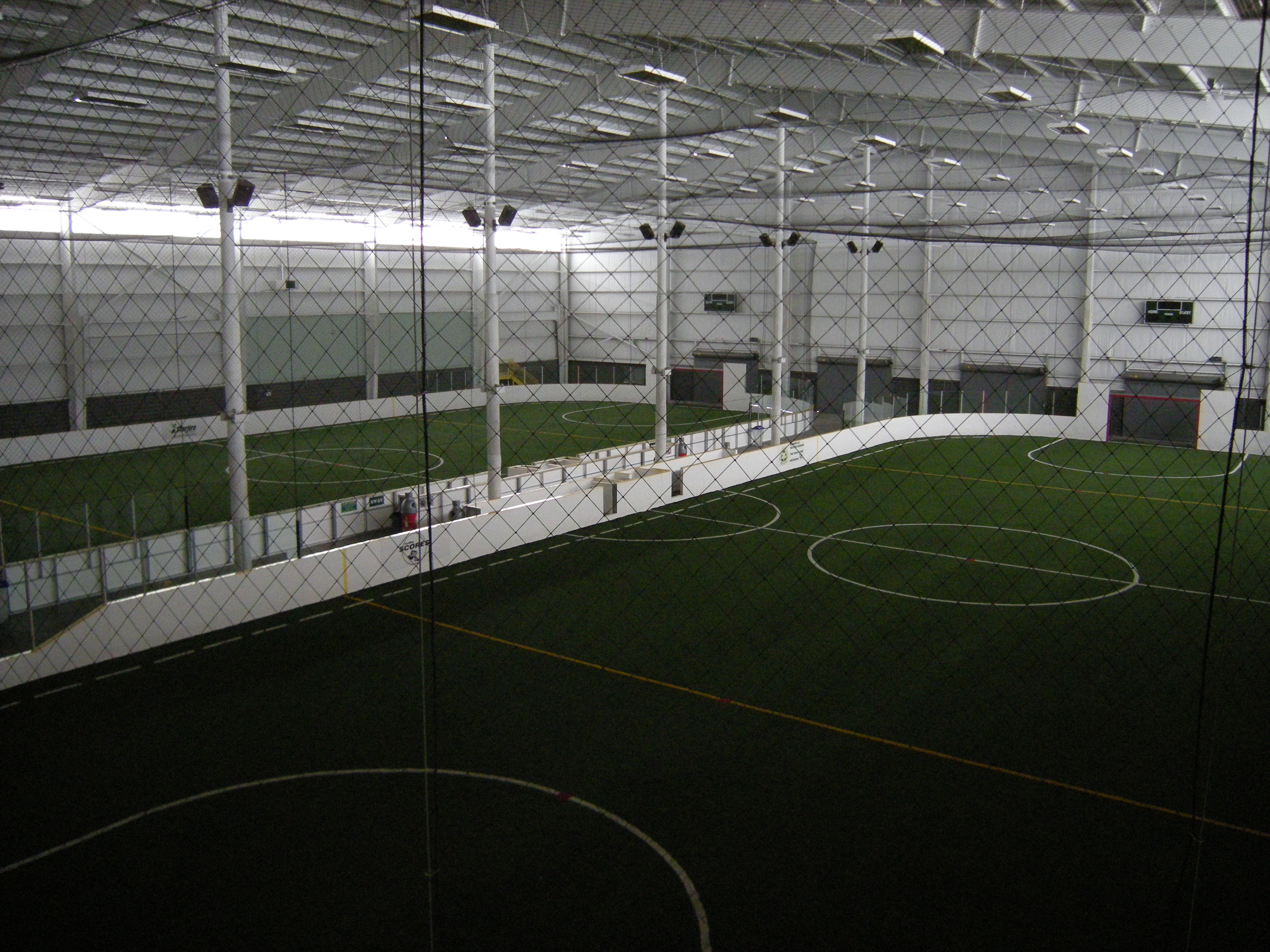
An indoor soccer arena with boards

Before Futsal was overseen by FIFA, the first Futsal World Champion was held in São Paulo, Brazil. This competition took place in 1982 and was conducted by the FIFUSA (before FIFA). Brazil came in first in the first Futsal World Tournament (1982) and the second Futsal World Tournament (1985). FIFA overtook this championship in 1989 and renamed the competition the FIFA Futsal World Championship.

During its existence, FIFRA organized several indoor soccer tournaments for national teams, including the Indoor Soccer World Championship. The only edition of this tournament took place in Mexico in 1997. No other world championship was played until 2015, when the first WMF World Cup was held in the United States. As of 2019 three WMF World Cups have been organized, with Mexico being the current world champion. A World Cup for Under-21 players was held in Prague in 2018, with the Czech team taking the title. A World Cup for women is planned for 2021 in Kyiv, Ukraine.

Star Sixes, an indoor six-a-side football tournament for national teams from around the world, was held in the O2 Arena in London in 2017. Held outside the auspices of the WMF, this tournament featured players which formerly played in the association football national teams of their home countries. A total of twelve teams participated, with France winning the title. It is intended to make Star Sixes a recurring event; a second edition took place in 2019, with England winning the title.

=== United States and Canada ===
Indoor soccer is a common sport in the United States and Canada, with both amateur and professional leagues. It is popular due to the short season for outdoor soccer in Canada and the Northern United States, and the ubiquity of arenas built for ice hockey and basketball which can easily be converted to indoor soccer. Indoor soccer is especially popular in Northern Canada due to the often unplayable outdoor conditions and its appearance in the Arctic Winter Games.

The United States Indoor Soccer Association was founded in 1998. USIndoor soccer oversees all indoor soccer sports as well as "arena soccer" and "Futsal" in the United States.

Major Arena Soccer League is the top indoor soccer league in North America.

=== Mexico ===
Indoor soccer or fútbol rápido has also become a popular sport in Mexico, being included as part of the Universiada (University National Games) and the CONADEIP (Private School Tournament), in which university school teams from all over Mexico compete. In Mexico, "indoor" soccer fields are frequently built outdoors (though indoor courts are also used in some tournaments). In 2012 an eight-team indoor soccer league was launched, which consists of former professional association football players from Liga MX.

=== South America ===
Indoor soccer is known in Brazil as showbol, with several current regional leagues. Formal national leagues have also been formed in Bolivia, Colombia, Uruguay, Ecuador and Peru. However, the most common variations of indoor soccer played in Brazil are futsal but also futebol society.

=== Europe ===
Indoor soccer is also played in several European countries. In the United Kingdom, Masters Football is the most well-known competition. Tournaments among Masters teams (consisting of veteran former players from professional 11-a-side teams from each country) are regularly played. In Spain, some over-30 ex-professionals represent their clubs in the Liga Fertiberia which plays a five-a-side variant.

The European indoor soccer federation, known as the European Minifootball Federation (EMF), organizes the European Minifootball Championship (miniEURO) every year, and in recent years countries have established national minifootball associations. EMF organize variations of six-a-side football and this could come in different shapes and sizes from a large custom-built facility with multiple pitches or even an 11-a-side pitch temporarily split into smaller pitches. This is not to be confused with the term used in Russia and some other former Soviet countries, where the term mini-football is used to describe futsal.

=== Australia ===
Indoor soccer's journey within Australia can be traced back to its emergence as a response to challenges posed by weather conditions and limited outdoor space. As the sport gained traction, purpose-built indoor facilities started to dot the Australian landscape, offering players a controlled environment where they could indulge in their passion year-round.

== Rules ==
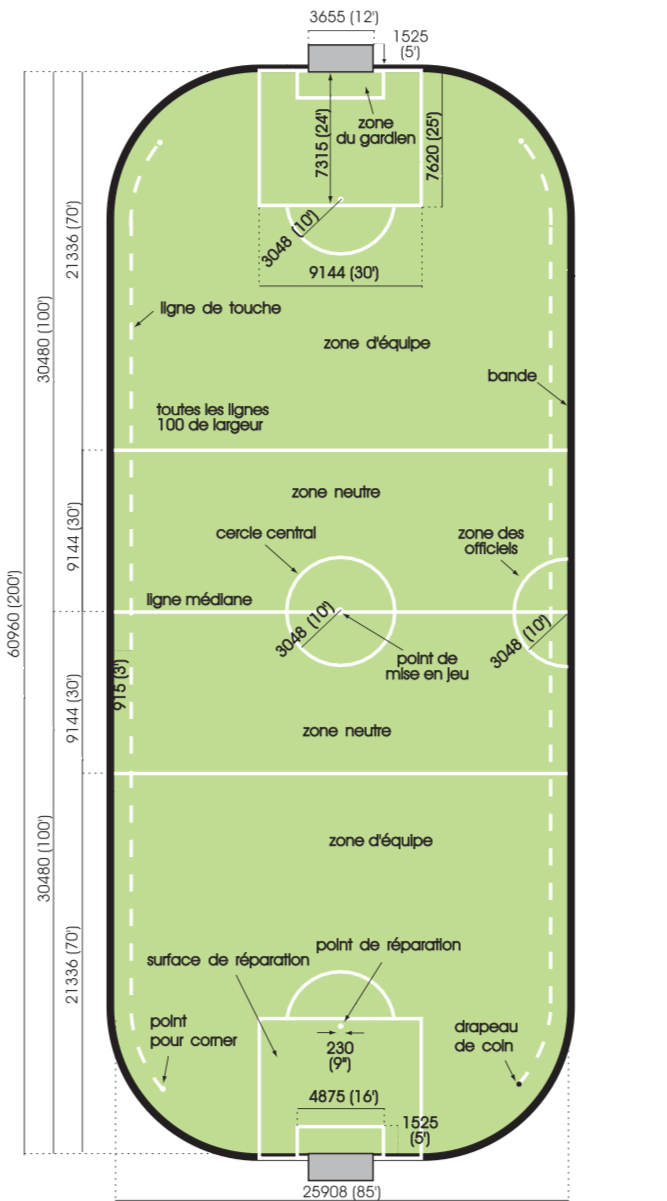
Diagram of a possible North American indoor soccer field

Rules vary between governing bodies, but some of the nearly universal rule deviations from association football include:

- The Field. Most indoor soccer arenas are rectangular or oblong in shape, with artificial turf floors. In many collegiate intramural leagues, the game may be played on basketball courts, in which case the floor is hardwood. Walls (often the hockey dasher boards and plexiglas used for that sport) bound the arena. Field sizes are generally smaller than soccer fields, and the goals are recessed into the walls. Goals are also smaller than in standard soccer and the penalty area is also smaller. The field is commonly 200' by 85' (approx 61m by 26m), the regulation size for a hockey rink in North America.
- Duration. Most indoor soccer games are divided into four quarters of 15 minutes each, for a total of 60 minutes of play time. There are two 3-minute periods between the first and second, third and fourth quarters and one 15-minute half-time between the second and third quarters. If the game stays tied until the time runs out, there will be extra 15-minute, golden goal overtime periods. However, amateur leagues generally consist of two 25-minute halves with no overtime for tied games. In Futsal, each team may announce one timeout per half consisting of one minute each. Also, there is no added times for injuries, overtime, or stoppage time.
- The team. Most indoor soccer games are played with six active players per team including goalkeeper and either defense or forward also known as attackers and strikers. Substitute players are permitted. At high levels of play, it is common for players to move fluidly between positions instead of staying statically in one position.
- Play off of walls. The ball may be struck in such a way that it contacts one or more walls without penalty or stoppage. If the ball flies over the walls or contacts the ceiling, play is stopped and the team opposing the one that most recently touched the ball is awarded a free kick at the location where the ball left the arena or made contact with the ceiling.
- Contact rules. Standard contact rules generally apply (i.e. ball contact must be made during a play on the ball, no charging with hands or elbows, no charging from behind, no holding the opponent etc.). Many leagues ban the use of the sliding tackle, though such techniques are less useful on artificial turf or wood than they are on a slick natural turf field. If one attempts to slide on an indoor field, painful burns and/or cuts can occur.
- No offside. Most leagues play without an offside rule. Some leagues enforce a "three-line violation", prohibiting players from playing the ball in the air from behind the front line of their own penalty area across all three lines into the opponent's penalty area. Violations often result in a free kick for the opposing team at the front line of the offending team's penalty area.

Beyond these common threads, the sport is structured according to the idiosyncrasies of individual leagues. Most of these rules are adopted from other arena sports like ice hockey. Below is a listing of some of the more common ones:

- Substitution. Most leagues allow unlimited substitutions while the ball is out of play. Some allow live substitution while the game is in progress, provided that one player leaves the arena before another steps on. A minority of leagues require substitution in shifts.
- Cards. In addition to the traditional yellow and red cards of association football, some leagues include a card of a third color (blue is a common color) or another form of warning before the issuance of a yellow card. Often, leagues with a third card include a penalty box rule, and issuance of this third card requires the penalized player to sit in the box for a prescribed period of time (usually two minutes as in ice hockey) during which his or her team plays shorthanded. In leagues using the traditional card system, it is common for the yellow card to carry with it a penalty box rule. A blue card in an indoor league can be for serious fouls or unsportsmanlike like behavior. For example, it can be because of a deliberate handball by a player, mishandling of the ball by a goal keeper, goalkeeper endangerment, boarding, and any foul during a shootout by the goalkeeper. A blue card requires a two- minute penalty for the player. If you were to obtain a second blue card, you would be awarded a yellow card in its place and be punished with another two-minute penalty. A third time penalty receives an administrative red card meaning a two- minute penalty and ejection for the player. A straight red card receives a five- minute penalty and ejection for the player.
- Zones. Because of short fields and walls surrounding the goal, a common tactic is to attempt to score at kickoff by shooting at the goal and charging at the goal with all five non-goalkeeper players who overwhelm the other team's defense and score at close range. As this depletes the tactics and drama of the game, many leagues have adopted an ice hockey-like zone rule, requiring that the ball not cross more than a certain forward distance toward the goal without being touched by a player.
- The ball. For indoor soccer played on artificial turf, the soccer ball is regulation and the same as outdoor soccer. For futsal, or indoor soccer on hard wood, the ball is designed to be low- bounce, weighted, and harder as there is a smaller playing area.
- The crease. Some leagues enforce a special zone inside the goalkeeper's box called the crease. No player may shoot the ball from inside the crease unless that player entered the crease already having the ball.
- Multi-point scoring. Some leagues value goals scored from a greater distance to be worth two or three points from behind an arc, similar to basketball's three-point field goal. Sometimes, leagues with a multi-point system also use a rule that a minor technical infraction gives the non-offending team a one-on-one opportunity to score on the opposing goalkeeper, worth one point. Many indoor coed leagues will give a female player two points for scoring a single goal.
- Sixth attacker. Some leagues allow a team which is trailing by one or two goals late in the final period to replace the goalkeeper with a sixth position player to increase its offense in an attempt to tie the match, exactly as is done in ice hockey under those conditions.
- Goalkeeper. In Indoor arena soccer, the goalkeeper has different rules than regular soccer mandates. If the goalie has control of the ball, with either hands or feet for over five seconds in the penalty arch, a free kick will be awarded to the opposite team. In Futsal, the goalkeeper may not possess the ball for over four seconds in their own half. Also, the goalkeeper is not allowed to throw the ball over the half-way line. In addition, the goalkeeper may not touch the ball if the ball did not go out of play, go over the halfway line, or become in possession of the opposite team. In any of these circumstances, a penalty will be awarded and a penalty kick for the other team will take place.
- Accumulated Fouls. In Futsal, all fouls are recorded on the score board and if a team reaches six or more fouls, the opposing team is awarded a free kick without a wall. There are two penalty spots to take a kick from depending on where the penalty happened. The first penalty spot is 20 feet from the goal line on the top of the arch. The second penalty spot is 30 feet from the goal line and at the center of the goal. The accumulated fouls are reset at the beginning of the second half but carry over into extra time.

== Leagues ==
=== Europe ===
- Football Mundial (United Kingdom)
- Leisure Leagues (United Kingdom)
- Masters Football (United Kingdom)

=== North America ===
- Major Arena Soccer League (United States and Mexico)
- Major Arena Soccer League 2 (United States)
- Major Arena Soccer League 3 (United States)
- Major Arena Soccer League Women (United States)
- Major League Indoor Soccer (United States)
- Western Indoor Soccer League (United States)

=== South America ===
- Brazilian Championship (Brazil)
- Rio-São Paulo Tournament (Brazil)

=== Former ===
- American Indoor Soccer League (United States)
- Arena Premier League (Canada)
- Canadian Major Indoor Soccer League (Canada)
- Continental Indoor Soccer League (United States and Mexico)
- Eastern Indoor Soccer League (United States)
- I-League (never played a game; instead merged with MISL)
- Indoor Professional League (never played a game; teams rejoined MASL)
- U.S. Arena Professional Soccer League (2019) (Merge with MASL 2)
- Major Indoor Soccer League (1978–1992)
- Major Indoor Soccer League (2001–08) (split into the XSL and NISL)
- Major Indoor Soccer League (2008–2014) (originally called the National Indoor Soccer League; merged with PASL to form the MASL)
- National Professional Soccer League (originally called the American Indoor Soccer Association)
- National Soccer League (never played a game; not to be confused with the NISL)
- North American Soccer League (1968–1984) (indoor and outdoor soccer league)
- Premier Arena Soccer League (merged with MASL 3 and WMASL)
- Southwest Indoor Soccer League (evolved into the outdoor USL)
- World Indoor Soccer League (originally the Premier Soccer Alliance)
- Xtreme Soccer League (United States)

== See also ==
- Arena football
- Box lacrosse
- Football
- Jorkyball
- Beach soccer
- Street football
- Street Soccer USA
- Futsal
- Minifootball
- Limonta
