= Sergije Krešić =

Croatian footballer and manager

Sergio Krešić
Personal information
- Full name: Sergije Jurić Krešić
- Date of birth: 29 November 1946 (age 79)
- Place of birth: Split, PR Croatia, Yugoslavia
- Position: Centre back

Youth career
- 1960–1964: Hajduk Split

Senior career*
| Years | Team | Apps | (Gls) |
| 1964–1967 | Hajduk Split | 3 | (1) |
| 1965–1967 | → RNK Split (loan) | ? | (?) |
| 1967–1968 | Cleveland Stokers | 13 | (4) |
| 1969–1970 | Beveren | 2 | (0) |
| 1970–1972 | FK Bor | 30 | (8) |
| 1972–1975 | OFK Belgrade | 69 | (7) |
| 1975–1978 | Burgos | 70 | (6) |
| 1978 | Houston Hurricane | 0 | (0) |

Managerial career
- 1986: Hajduk Split
- 1987–1988: Real Burgos
- 1989–1993: Atlético Marbella
- 1993–1994: Real Betis
- 1994–1997: Mérida
- 1997–1999: Real Valladolid
- 1999–2001: Las Palmas
- 2001–2002: Mallorca
- 2003–2004: Recreativo de Huelva
- 2004–2005: Real Valladolid
- 2006: Real Murcia
- 2007: Hajduk Split
- 2008–2009: Numancia
- 2009–2010: Las Palmas
- * Club domestic league appearances and goals

Sergije Krešić (born 29 November 1946) is a Croatian retired football manager and former player. Krešić coached a number of lower level sides in Spain, where he is known by the name Sergio Kresic.

== Playing career ==
He joined Hajduk Split youth team in 1960, becoming a senior in 1965. That same year he played with a neighbouring club RNK Split and a year later returned to Hajduk and became the youth squad coach. After finishing his high-school studies in 1968 he moved to United States where he played indoor football with Cleveland Stokers. Afterwards he returned to Europe to play with Belgian club KSK Beveren. In 1970, he moved back to Yugoslavia and plays first until 1972 with Yugoslav First League club FK Bor, and afterwards between 1972 and 1975 with OFK Beograd. In 1975, he signed with Spanish La Liga side Burgos CF and stayed until 1978. His good attitude and quality exhibitions resulted in him becoming team captain in his last season there, an achievement hard to accomplish in those days for a foreigner. His last season as player was spent back in the States with Houston in 1978.

== Coaching career ==
Krešić started his coaching career in 1983 as an assistant manager to Petar Nadoveza in Hajduk Split. In 1984 Nadoveza was replaced by Stanko Poklepović, and when Poklepović was sacked in 1986 Krešić took over but did not stay there too long.

After 20 years of coaching in Spain he returned to Hajduk but after a few months he left the club. Krešić is no longer currently coaching CD Numancia, being appointed in July 2008, on 17 February 2009 was let go with Numancia in the Relegation zone of the primera liga. On 17 June 2009 UD Las Palmas have signed the coach until June 2010. In August 2012 he was appointed sporting director at HNK Hajduk Split. After 9 months working as sporting director he was sacked by Hajduk chairman Marin Brbić in April 2013.

Managerial record by team and tenure
| Team | From | To | Record | | | | | Ref |
| Team | From | To | P | W | D | L | Win % | Ref |
|---|---|---|---|---|---|---|---|---|
| Hajduk Split | 1986 | 1986 | | | | | | |
| Real Burgos | August 1987 | October 1988 | 46 | 12 | 14 | 20 | 26.1 | |
| Atlético Marbella | December 1989 | February 1992 | | | | | | |
| Atlético Marbella | September 1992 | March 1993 | | | | | | |
| Betis | September 1993 | February 1994 | | | | | | |
| Mérida | September 1994 | February 1997 | | | | | | |
| Valladolid | October 1997 | June 1999 | | | | | | |
| Las Palmas | August 1999 | June 2001 | | | | | | |
| Mallorca | October 2001 | April 2002 | | | | | | |
| Recreativo Huelva | November 2003 | June 2004 | | | | | | |
| Valladolid | August 2004 | March 2005 | | | | | | |
| Murcia | January 2006 | June 2006 | | | | | | |
| Hajduk Split | 20 September 2007 | 5 December 2007 | | | | | | |
| Numancia | August 2008 | February 2009 | | | | | | |
| Las Palmas | August 2009 | April 2010 | | | | | | |
| Total | | | 829 | 542 | 172 | 115 | 65.4 | — |

== Honours ==
=== Manager ===
Atlético Marbella

- Tercera División: 1990–91
- Segunda División B: 1991–92

Mérida

- Segunda División: 1994–95

Las Palmas

- Segunda División: 1999–00
