= José Manuel León =

Spanish association football player

Personal information
- Full name: José Manuel León Talavera
- Date of birth: 15 May 1944
- Place of birth: Las Palmas, Spain
- Date of death: February 15, 2020 (aged 75)
- Position: Midfielder

Senior career*
| Years | Team | Apps | (Gls) |
| 1962-1975 | UD Las Palmas | 281 | (56) |
- * Club domestic league appearances and goals

José Manuel León Talavera (15 May 1944 – 15 February 2020), was a Spanish footballer and coach who played for UD Las Palmas. José Manuel León played for Las Palmas for 13 years.

== Post career ==
After retiring from professional football Manuel León coached various teams at the Segunda División B level.
