= Satur Grech =

Spanish football manager

Personal information
- Full name: Saturnino Grech Pomares
- Date of birth: 6 June 1914
- Place of birth: Alicante, Spain
- Date of death: 31 July 2001 (aged 87)
- Place of death: Palma, Spain
- Position: Defender

Senior career*
| Years | Team | Apps | (Gls) |
| 1939–1941 | Sabadell | 31 | (7) |
| 1941–1942 | Cartagena | 13 | (2) |
| 1943–1946 | Mallorca | | |

Managerial career
- 1949–1950: Mallorca
- 1953: Mallorca
- 1953–1957: Las Palmas
- 1957: Sevilla
- 1960–1961: Hércules
- 1961–1962: Mallorca
- 1962: Atlético Baleares
- 1963: Cartagena
- 1964–1965: Tenerife
- 1965–1968: Racing Ferrol
- 1968–1969: Lleida
- 1969–1970: Compostela
- 1971: Racing Ferrol
- 1971: Lleida
- * Club domestic league appearances and goals

Saturnino Grech Pomares (6 June 1914 – 31 July 2001) was a Spanish retired footballer and manager.

== Coaching career ==
He coached Las Palmas, Sevilla, Hércules, Mallorca, Atlético Baleares, Tenerife, Racing de Ferrol, and Compostela.
