= Liga de Fútbol Indoor =

- Founded: 2008
- Country: Portugal; Spain
- Domestic cup: Copa de España
- Current champions: F.C.Porto (1st title) (2014)
- Most championships: Deportivo (2 titles)
- Website: ligafutbolindoor.com
- Current: 2014 season

The Campeonato Nacional de Liga de Fútbol Indoor (National Championship Indoor Football League), commonly known for sponsorship reasons Liga Fertiberia, is an indoor football competition in Spain and Portugal, operated by the Asociación de Fútbol Indoor. Is played with players over the age of 30, former football players.

== Honours ==
| Year | Champion | Runner-up | Result | Top scorer |
|---|---|---|---|---|
| 2008 | Deportivo | Real Madrid | League | |
| 2009 | Barcelona | Real Madrid | League | (Spain) Juan Sánchez (38 goals) |
| 2010 | Deportivo | Betis | League | (Spain) Juan Sánchez (45 goals) |
| 2011 | Sporting | Mallorca | 11–4 | (Spain) Fredi (25 goals) |
| 2012 | Real Madrid | Barcelona | 7–1 | (Spain) Amavisca (20 goals) |
| 2013 | Celta de Vigo | Valladolid | 9–8 | (Spain) Juan Sánchez (26 goals) |
| 2014 | FC Porto | Real Madrid | 12–9 | (Portugal) Rui Barros (12 goals) |

== See also ==
- Copa de España de Fútbol Indoor
- Supercopa de España de Fútbol Indoor
