= Football Mundial =

Football Mundial is a private company running five-a-side and six-a-side football leagues in England, Wales, and Scotland. It is registered with the Football Association.

Founded in 1989, Football Mundial now runs more than 28 leagues all over the UK, in which over 2,000 people take part. As well as administering the leagues, the group also supplies qualified referees for matchplay, as well as arranging venues for matches.

Football Mundial have new leagues starting all the time and they run all year round. Games are mainly played outdoors on Astroturf Pitches on midweek evenings between 6-10pm.
