= Paco Castellano =

Spanish footballer and coach

Personal information
- Full name: Francisco Castellano Rodríguez
- Date of birth: 17 November 1944 (age 81)
- Place of birth: Arucas, Spain
- Height: 1.79 m (5 ft 10 1/2 in)
- Position: Centre back

Youth career
- Las Palmas

Senior career*
Years	Team	Apps	(Gls)
- Las Palmas B
1964–1978	Las Palmas	371	(17)

International career
1963	Spain U18	2	(0)
1967	Spain U23	2	(0)
1968	Spain	2	(1)

Managerial career
- 1991–1992: Maspalomas
- 1993–1994: Las Palmas B
- 1994–1995: Las Palmas
- 1997: Las Palmas
- 1998–1999: Las Palmas
- 2001–2002: Gáldar
- 2004–2005: Universidad LP
- 2006: San Isidro
- 2008: Universidad LP
- 2009: Las Palmas
- * Club domestic league appearances and goals

Francisco "Paco" Castellano Rodríguez (born 17 November 1944) is a Spanish football coach and former player who played as a centre back.

He spent his 14-year professional career with Las Palmas, amassing totals of 371 games and 17 goals in La Liga.
