= Vicente Dauder =

Spanish footballer and manager

Personal information
- Full name: Vicente Dauder Guardiola
- Date of birth: 25 November 1924
- Place of birth: Valencia, Spain
- Date of death: 9 February 2001 (aged 76)
- Place of death: Castellón, Spain
- Position: Goalkeeper

Youth career
- Badalona

Senior career*
Years	Team	Apps	(Gls)
- Badalona
- Europa
- Vilanova
1948–1950	Gimnàstic	36	(0)
1950–1952	Atlético Madrid	1	(0)
1952–1955	Celta	21	(0)
1955–1958	Hércules	7	(0)
1958–1959	Alicante		
1959–1960	Crevillente		

Managerial career
- 1958–1959: Alicante
- 1959–1960: Crevillente
- 1960–1961: Figueras
- 1961–1963: Eldense
- 1963–1966: Las Palmas
- 1966–1967: Hércules
- 1967–1968: Mallorca
- 1968–1970: Castellón
- 1971: Algemesí
- 1971–1974: Gimnástico
- 1974–1976: Tarrassa
- 1976–1977: Almería
- 1977: Levante
- 1978–1979: Vinaroz
- 1979–1983: Andorra
- 1984–1985: Sabadell
- 1985: Gimnástico
- 1986–1988: Eldense
- 1990–1991: Andorra
- 1992–1994: Seu d'Urgell
- * Club domestic league appearances and goals

Vicente Dauder Guardiola (25 November 1924 – 9 February 2001) was a Spanish football goalkeeper and manager.

== Honours ==
=== Player ===
Atlético Madrid

- La Liga: 1950–51
- Eva Duarte Cup: 1951

=== Manager ===
Las Palmas

- Segunda División: 1963–64

Sabadell

- Segunda División B: 1983–84

Eldense

- Tercera División: 1961–62

Castellón

- Tercera División: 1968–69

Gimnàstic de Tarragona

- Tercera División: 1971–72

Terrassa

- Tercera División: 1974–75

Andorra

- Tercera División: 1979–80
