= Rosendo Hernández =

Spanish footballer

Personal information
- Full name: Rosendo Hernández González
- Date of birth: 11 March 1922
- Place of birth: Santa Cruz de La Palma, Spain
- Date of death: 3 August 2006 (aged 84)
- Place of death: Santa Cruz de La Palma, Spain
- Height: 1.67 m (5 ft 6 in)
- Position: Forward

Youth career
- Tenisca
- Mensajero

Senior career*
Years	Team	Apps	(Gls)
1942–1943	Cultural Leonesa		
1943–1944	Atlético Aviación	0	(0)
1944–1950	Español	129	(52)
1950–1952	Zaragoza	43	(22)
1952–1953	Las Palmas	19	(7)
1953–1954	Escoriaza	19	(6)
Total		210	(87)

International career
1949–1950	Spain	4	(0)

Managerial career
- 1960: Zaragoza
- 1962–1963: Las Palmas
- 1963–1964: Córdoba
- 1964: Elche
- 1965: Betis
- 1966–1967: Lleida
- 1970: Las Palmas
- 1971: Zaragoza
- * Club domestic league appearances and goals

Rosendo Hernández González (11 March 1922 – 3 August 2006) was a Spanish football forward and manager.

== Club career ==
Born in Santa Cruz de La Palma, Province of Santa Cruz de Tenerife, Hernández started playing football with local Canary Islands clubs SD Tenisca and CD Mensajero. At the end of the Spanish Civil War he joined Cultural y Deportiva Leonesa, followed by a move to Atlético Madrid which he never represented officially.

From 1950 to 1952, Hernández competed almost exclusively in La Liga (the exception being the 1950–51 season in Segunda División), representing RCD Español and Real Zaragoza and amassing totals of 143 games and 62 goals. After retiring in Aragon with SD Escoriaza he went into management, working in the top flight with Córdoba CF, Elche CF, Real Betis – he split the 1964–65 campaign between the two clubs, being in charge for only ten matches combined – and Las Palmas; he died at the age of 84 in his hometown.

== International career ==
Hernández gained four caps for the Spain national team, during one year and four months. He was selected to the squad that competed at the 1950 FIFA World Cup, appearing in the tournament against the United States (3–1 win, first group stage) and Sweden (1–3 loss, second group phase).
