= UD Las Palmas =

Spanish association football team

Las Palmas
- Full name: Unión Deportiva Las Palmas, S.A.D.
- Nicknames: Canarias; Los Amarillos (The Yellows); La Unión Deportiva; Pío Pío
- Founded: 22 August 1949; 77 years ago
- Stadium: Estadio Gran Canaria
- Capacity: 32,400
- President: Miguel Ángel Ramírez
- Head coach: Juan Manuel Rodríguez (caretaker)
- League: Segunda División
- 2025–26: Segunda División, 5th of 22
- Website: udlaspalmas.es
Home colours	Away colours	Third colours

Unión Deportiva Las Palmas, S.A.D. is a professional football club based in Las Palmas de Gran Canaria, Canary Islands, Spain. The club currently compete in Segunda División, the 2nd tier of the Spanish football league system following their relegation from La Liga in the 2024–25 season. Nicknamed Los Amarillos, the club was founded on 22 August 1949 as a result of a merger between five clubs in the Canary region. The club initially played in the Estadio Insular before beginning hosting their home matches at the Estadio Gran Canaria in 2003.

Las Palmas have been Segunda División champions four times, in 1953–54, 1963–64, 1984–85 and 1999–2000, and have won the Segunda División B twice, in 1992–93 and 1995–96. They have been runners-up in La Liga once, in 1968–69, and runners-up in the Copa del Rey, in 1977–78. Las Palmas is the only side in Spanish football to achieve back-to-back promotions to La Liga in their first two seasons. They had a 19-year run in the competition, ending in 1982–83 and has been promoted to La Liga on four additional occasions since that time, achieving it recently in 2022–23.

Since its foundation, the club has played with yellow and blue as their primary and secondary colours. They have a fierce rivalry with neighbouring island Tenerife, with whom they contest the Canary Islands derby. The two clubs are among the most isolated professional football clubs in Europe since they play their away games on the distant Spanish mainland.

== History ==
=== Foundation ===
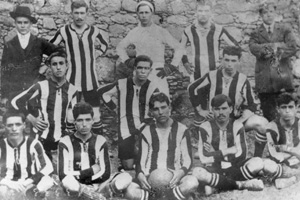
Real Club Victoria in 1910.

A decade after the Spanish Civil War, football in Las Palmas faced numerous challenges and difficulties. The financial situations of Las Palmas’ five biggest clubs, Real Club Victoria, Marino FC, CD Gran Canaria, Atlético Club, and Arenas Club, were deteriorating rapidly due to their financial strength of being able to compete for players against Spain's top clubs. A new registration law by the Royal Spanish Football Federation, which limited players to a maximum of a two-year contract, resulted in the clubs in Las Palmas being unable to retain their academy players for extended periods. Consequently, many players relocated to the Spanish mainland to continue their football careers in national competitions. As a result, Eufemiano Fuentes Díaz, president of Marino CF, went to a meeting in Madrid to change the legislation of contracts to a minimum of four years. A different proposal was also presented, stating that all Spanish clubs were prohibited from signing players in the Canary region with the exception if they were first-team players who had already passed the stage of being academy players. These proposals were delayed and denied by the RFEF.

During this time, clubs continued to see their debts increase, leading to the possibility of defunction. The Vice President of the Las Palmas Football Federation, Manuel Rodríguez Monroy, proposed a merger of the five teams comprising the regional competition, aiming to compete in national competitions and resolve the economic situation as a result. The purpose of this proposal was to present a compelling case to the RFEF for allowing the Canary Islands to participate in national competitions, enabling Canarian footballers to compete without relocating to the Spanish mainland. This proposal was presented towards the president, Adolfo Miranda Ortega, who among other board members agreed. On 4 February 1949, a letter was sent to the presidents of the five clubs, proposing a potential merger to compete in the national competitions. The first meeting was held on 28 February 1949 in Alameda de Colón, Las Palmas with the representatives of the five merging clubs attending. Gran Canaria, Atlético and Arenas promptly agreed to the proposal due to their finances whilst Marino and Victoria remained wary of the repercussions it could have on the club and its fans. From there, the representatives agreed to meet every Monday and create a collaborative group that would be known as the Fusion Presentation.

Don José Del Río Amor, of legal age and from this neighborhood, acting as President of the Management Commission of the Club "Unión Deportiva Las Palmas" to that Excma. Corporation that allows exhibiting: That by agreement of the five teams that make up the First Regional Category, dependent on the Regional Football Federation of Las Palmas de Gran Canaria, it has been done with permission to merge them with the objective that, grouped in one only all their potential economically and sportingly, incorporate this powerful Club into national football competitions.

Likewise, and by unanimous agreement of the merged teams, its name is "Unión Deportiva Las Palmas" and that both the colors and the shield of the teams resulting from this merger are those of this city; but for the latter to be legally carried out, it is necessary that the Hon. Corporation gives its approval in this regard, that is why it begs that Excma. Corporation that, having presented this document, deigns to authorize the aforementioned Club "Unión Deportiva Las Palmas" to use the shield of this city, orlando with the name of this Club and the emblems of the five merged teams.

It is grace that you expect from that Excma. Corporation, whose life God save many years.

Las Palmas de Gran Canaria, September 1, 1949.

— Letter by José Del Río Amor, President of UD Las Palmas.

After more than a month of deliberations, Miranda and Monroy were delegated the role of requesting a transfer into the Spanish Second Division via a letter to the RFEF. The letter was sent on 4 April 1949 but the proposition was rejected for being to detriment for the other teams and that it would alter the regulation of promotions. However, Ricardo Cabot, a secretary in the RFEF, resumed the proposition towards the board members and, on 6 June 1949, following a meeting in Madrid that Miranda and Monroy attended, it was announced by telegram that Canary Islands football was accepted into the third division of Spanish football. The acceptance allowed the merger of Arenas Club and CD Gran Canaria, both of whom gave up their headquarters and trophies, to form under the name Unión Deportiva Las Palmas as the first phase for total integration.

On 16 August 1949, the Fusion Presentation had their last meeting where after coming in contact with Marino and Victoria stated the clubs would not merge as of yet due to difficult financial situation. This led to refusals to financially support the lease of the Las Palmas Stadium for UD Las Palmas to play its games in the 1949–50 season. As a result, a "Magna Assembly" was held by Monroy on 22 August 1949 at Real Club Náutico. After a successful meeting in which all five clubs unanimously agreed towards the final proposition presented by Monroy, Unión Deportiva Las Palmas was officially established at 8 p.m. on 22 August 1949. A committee was established with José del Río Amor as the club's first president and Monroy appointed as the club's first vice president. The headquarters of Las Palmas was located in the Plazoleta Luis Antunez.

Las Palmas’ first training session was held on 16 September 1949 with new manager, Pancho Arencibia. Juan Santana Macías, a winger from Atlético, was the first player signed by the club and was present during the training session. On 9 October 1949, Las Palmas played their first match against Marino with Antoñito Jorge scoring the first goal in their history of a 2–1 win at Las Palmas stadium. Antoñito played three seasons for Las Palmas, scoring 11 goals in their promotion campaign towards the Second Division.

=== 1949–1963 ===
In their debut competitive season, the club secured 2nd place in a group that included CD Tenerife, Imperial de Murcia, SD Ceuta, CD Toledo, and UD Melilla, earning promotion to the Second Division. Las Palmas played their first derby match against Tenerife on 30 April 1950, at the Santa Cruz Stadium, winning 2–1. Their first away match outside the islands was on 21 May 1950, against Toledo at the Palomarejos Stadium, resulting in a 5–2 victory. However, on 25 June 1950, Las Palmas suffered a 2–0 defeat in their last league match against Melilla, which initially threatened their chances of promotion. Fortunately, Imperial de Murcia, who sat third in the table, also faced defeat, securing Las Palmas' certified promotion to the Second Division. One of Las Palmas' first signed players and starter, Antonio Vieira, died from illness on 4 April 1951. His funeral was held in the Church of San Pablo and a tribute match was held with locals in which Las Palmas won 3–1. In the club's participation in the 1950–51 Second Division, the club achieved a second consecutive promotion to the First Division, following a 4–1 victory over Málaga on 8 July 1951 that sent the club to first place of the table. Las Palmas became the first club in Spanish football to gain promotion twice consecutively to the First Division despite being two years old at the time. By the end of the season, Las Palmas’ first goalkeeper, Manolo Montes, was sold to Atletico Madrid in 1951 for a fee of 375,000 Pt. Nicknamed "El Patrón", Montes made 55 official appearances for Los Amarillos and became the first player to be sold by the club.

The following season saw Las Palmas relegated down to the Second Division after coming 15th with 9 wins, 4 draws and 17 losses. In the club's first match of the season, Las Palmas would lose 4–1 to Real Madrid at the newly inaugurated Insular Stadium on 9 September 1951. A hat-trick from Pahiño and a goal from Luis Molowny sealed Madrid's win whilst Juan Cedrés scored the first goal in the division for Las Palmas. The following games saw defeat to Celta (5–2), Sevilla (5–0) and Deportivo La Coruña (3–1) before the club earned their first point to Racing Santandar after a 1–1 draw on 23 September 1951. The poor run of form convinced the club's personnel to sign more experienced players with Manolo Torres and Beneyto, both signing from Málaga on 14 October 1951 for a combined total of 1,000,000 Pt. The club achieved their first win of the season two days later, defeating Atlético Tetuán 4–1 with two goals from Torres on his debut and another two from Tacoronte. Additionally, the first foreign player for Las Palmas, Jean Luciano, who signed from Real Madrid, made his debut on 16 December 1951 in a 6–0 defeat to Real Zaragoza at Torrero Stadium.

In January 1952, goalkeeper José “Pepín” Casas Gris was signed as a replacement for Montes and for a starting position after goalkeepers Viera and González were having poor performances in recent matches. Born in Valencia, Pepín became the first player from the Peninsular region to represent Las Palmas. He arrived at the Hotel of Santa Brígida, Las Palmas from Alicante on 5 January 1952. On 26 March 1952, Las Palmas played Millonarios de Bogotá in a match that contained the likes of Alfredo Di Stéfano. The Colombian team at the time was considered the best in South America and had remained undefeated against the likes of Porto, Real Madrid, Sevilla and Valencia during their tour in Europe. Las Palmas triumphed 3–2 over Millonarios with Di Stéfano scoring his first goal in Spain whilst Las Palmas became the only European team to have defeated Millonarios. In the 1952–53 season, manager Luis Valle Benítez, who managed Las Palmas in their promotion campaign to the First Division, resigned on 6 October 1952. The club remained in the Second Division until the 1953–1954 season when they achieved promotion back to the First Division. The club won their first title in their history under Satur Grech after finishing first in the table, jointly becoming winners with Alavés. On 27 December 1953, Las Palmas played their first derby match against Tenerife in a national competition. Los Amarillos drew both matches they played against Tenerife, the last being on 25 April 1954 where a goalless draw led to Las Palmas' promotion at the Santa Cruz Stadium.

Las Palmas would stay in the First Division for the first time during the 1954–55 season after placing 12th on the table. During the season, Las Palmas won their first game against Barcelona on 9 February 1955 with a final score of 2–1 at the Insular Stadium. The club ensured survival with 27 points on 10 April 1955, defeating Celta 3–1 at home and overcoming Espanyol who sat below with 26 points on the table. The 1955–56 season saw Las Palmas reaching a peak of 3rd place in the first half of the season before succumbing towards a relegation battle in the second half of the season. According to Marcial Sánchez, a player who signed from Real Murcia in the 1954–55 season, the club briefly shared a spot in the top three of the league table with Barcelona at one point. However, due to the losses of key players, including captain Juan Beltrán and Marcial himself, the club's form deteriorated as the season progressed. Beltrán suffered a two-year knee injury, eventually recovering, but Marcial recalled that the player was never the same again and the injury led him to retirement. Beltrán, in particular, was a highly respected captain and nicknamed by the fans as "El del pañuelo en la frente" (The one with the handkerchief on his forehead). He was the first player selected from Las Palmas Atlético's side and also the first from the club to represent the Spain national football team. On 16 January 1957, Beltrán was appointed as the first designated youth coach of Las Palmas during his recovery from injury. During the 1956–57 season, Las Palmas claimed their 100th point in their First Division history on 28 October 1956 after a 2–2 draw with Valencia. Two Canarian-born players, Alfonso Silva and Rafael Mújica, both of whom were considered to be the best players from the Canary Islands, made their return to Las Palmas to play for Los Amarillos. Mújica made his league debut on 9 September 1956 in a 2–0 victory against Real Jaén at home while Silva made his debut midway through the season on 13 January 1957 when the club won 2–0 against Deportivo La Coruña at Estadio Riazor.

The 1957–58 season saw the appointment of Luis Molowny as a player-coach following the departure of the previous coach, José Urbieta after unsatisfactory results. Prior to his appointment, Las Palmas suffered from poor form in the first half of the season, including a 7–0 loss to Barcelona at the Camp Nou, a 6–1 defeat at home against Celta, and their largest-ever loss in the club's history, a 9–0 drubbing by Atletico Madrid at the Metropolitano. Molowny was signed on 5 December 1957, returning from Real Madrid, and scored 3 goals in 3 appearances for the club during that same season. The most notable match under Molowny's management was on 9 February 1958 when Las Palmas held a clash against Atletico Madrid at the Insular Stadium. With two former Atletico players, Silva and Mújica, Las Palmas triumphed 3–0 over Atletico Madrid in a match that was described for its “beauty and quality.” The club secured safety from relegation by defeating Real Valladolid 3–1 at home on 4 May 1958, which also resulted in Valladolid's relegation. For the first time in the club's history, Las Palmas resorted to the signings of more foreign players, Paraguayan player José Parodi and Argentine players, Pierutz, Ianizzotto and Puche, being the few that arrived at the club. Molowny was dropped at the end of the season and was replaced by Baltasar Albéniz for the subsequent season. Las Palmas avoided relegation once more, finishing in the relation playoff of the 1958–59 season. They played two home-away legs against Levante, who placed second in their league table during the season. The first leg was played on 10 May 1959 with Las Palmas winning 2–1 at Valencia before a week later, a 1–1 second leg draw at home ensured their survival.

Within the same season, Damián Massanet Plomer, the chairman of the Las Palmas Regional Football Federation, dismissed all board of directors of UD Las Palmas, alleging it to the debts that had been accumulating from previous seasons. In the 1959–60 season, Las Palmas eventually succumbed to relegation after six seasons in the First Division, with a total of 13 points gained from five wins and three draws by the end of the campaign. The club conceded the most goals out of the league, with 77 and garnered 22 league defeats, leading it to be Las Palmas's worst season at the time. During the season, Vicente Gonzalez Sosa became the first international youth player for Las Palmas, making four appearances for the Spain national under-18 team between March and April 1960. He would register three goals in six league appearances before departing, like most of his teammates, for Barcelona following the club's relegation. Las Palmas relegation was attributed to the over-reliance on foreign players, rather than trusting in the club's youth players, and increasing financial instability which by the end of the season had reached "an extreme situation."

=== Top-flight success ===
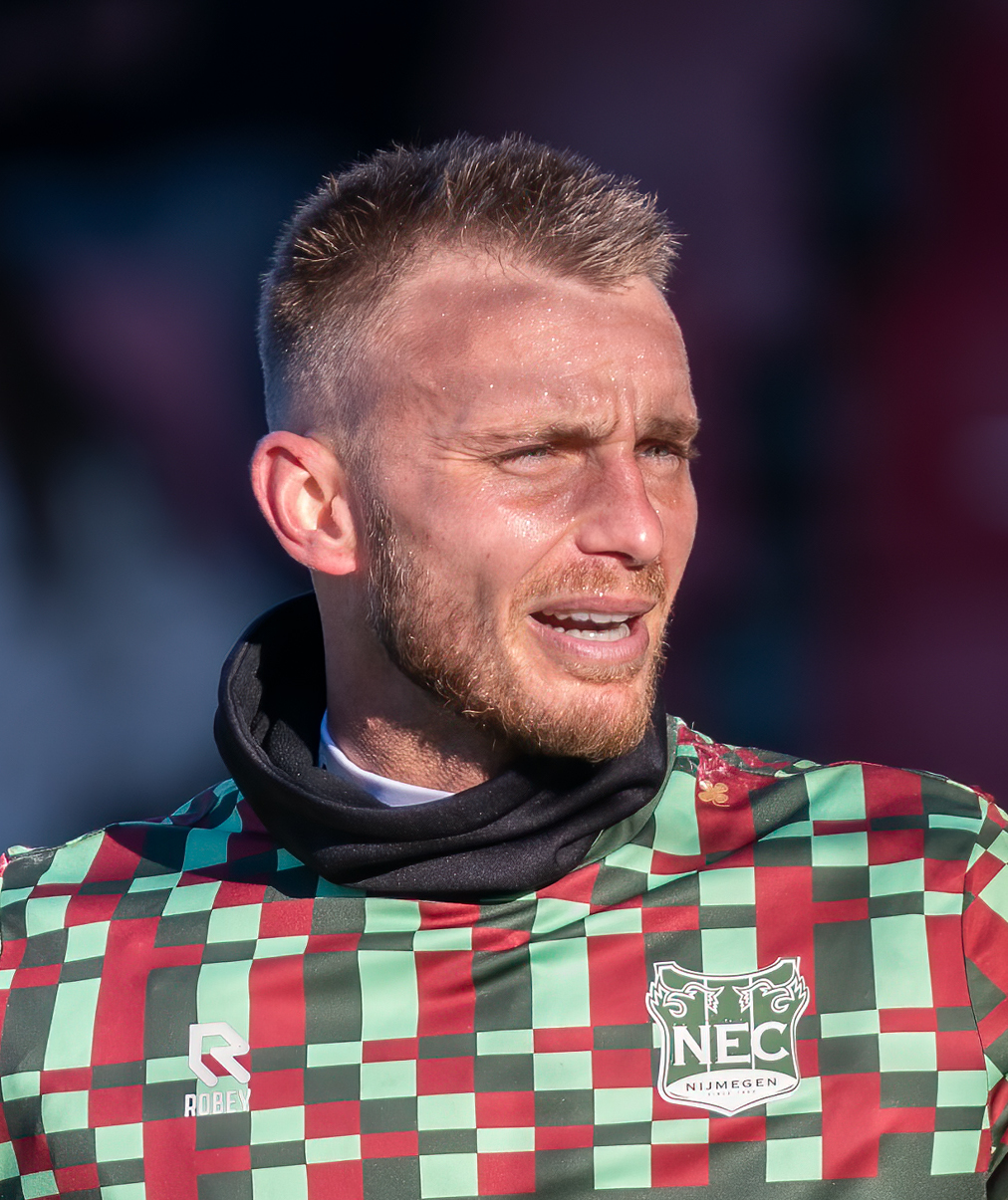
Jasper Cillessen joined UD Las Palmas in 2024

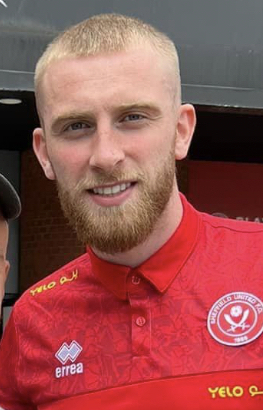
Oli McBurnie also joined UD Las Palmas in 2024

After Las Palmas returned to La Liga at the end of the 1963–64 season, again as champions, the club went on to have their most successful spell in the competition. Managed by Vicente Dauder, they finished third in 1967–68 behind Real Madrid and FC Barcelona, and four club players made the Spain squad which hosted and won the UEFA Euro 1964 tournament; the following season the team fared even better and only lost the league to Real Madrid, and thus qualified for European competition for the first time in its history, appearing in the 1969–70 Inter-Cities Fairs Cup and being knocked out in the first round by Germany's Hertha BSC (0–0 home draw, 0–1 away loss).

Chart of UD Las Palmas league performance 1929-present

Las Palmas player Juan Guedes died suddenly on 9 March 1971 at the age of 28. The next season, French coach Pierre Sinibaldi led the club to the fifth place, with subsequent qualification for the UEFA Cup: after disposing of Torino F.C. and ŠK Slovan Bratislava, the Spaniards bowed out to Dutch club FC Twente; at the end of 1974–75 another team player, Tonono – a defender who played with Guedes – died of a liver infection.

Las Palmas' third appearance in European competition came with the 1977–78 UEFA Cup, where they defeated FK Sloboda Tuzla of Yugoslavia in the first round before falling to the English side Ipswich Town. Under the management of Miguel Muñoz, and with players such as Argentines Miguel Ángel Brindisi, Daniel Carnevali (the first to arrive in 1973), Carlos Morete and Quique Wolff, the club also reached their first final of the Copa del Rey in that year, losing on 19 April to Barcelona at the Santiago Bernabéu Stadium (1–3).

From the 1990s onwards, Las Palmas played mainly in the Segunda División, but also spent six years in Segunda División B – the new third level created in 1977 – and, from 2000 to 2002, competed in the top flight. On 3 October 2001 the side managed a 4–2 home win against Real Madrid, with youth product Rubén Castro scoring two goals for the hosts, but the season ended nonetheless in relegation. On 22 December 2001, Las Palmas played its 1,000th game in La Liga. In the 2009–10 season in Segunda División the club finished 17th, just one point away from being relegated to Segunda División B. On 21 June 2015, Las Palmas was promoted back to La Liga after a 13-year hiatus by defeating Real Zaragoza on the away goals rule.

On 27 May 2023, Las Palmas achieved promotion to the first division by sealing a 2nd position in the table, respectively, on the very last match day of the season, after spending five years in the second tier.

== Ciudad deportiva ==
The Ciudad Deportiva UD Las Palmas, also known as Barranco Seco, is the training ground of UD Las Palmas. Occupying a total area of 70,000 m^{2}, the complex is located in the area known as Barranco Seco at the southern outskirts of the city of Las Palmas.

=== History and construction ===
The current land in Barranco Seco was acquired by UD Las Palmas during the 1960s by the efforts of then club director Manuel Betancor. During the 1970s, there was only a single training pitch used by the reserve and junior teams of the club. In 1982, when the ground was upgraded to be used as a training field by the first team.

In June 2015, the Ciudad Deportiva project was initiated. However, works did not start until 2017. After around 2 years of construction works, the complex was finally opened on July 8, 2019. It was designed by architect Juan Palop-Casado, who assured that the construction of this project was "an attempt that has been made to build with the greatest possible sustainability". The construction was executed by "Construcciones Alex y Nadal, S.L.", involving around 380 workers, 10,000 tons of sand, nearly 300 tons of steel, almost 2,000 cubic meters of concrete and beams of approximately 1,600 meters.

Being only the first phase of the entire sports city project, the club invested 22.5 million euros of its own funds to carry out the construction works of the current facilities. The construction of a multifunctional service building is scheduled in the second phase. The eventual area of the complex will become 70,000 m^{2} after the completion of the second phase.

=== Facilities ===
The new complex has modern changing rooms, a meeting hall, a gym with physiotherapy facilities, a dining room, a press room, in addition to two parking spaces designated for 130 vehicles. The Ciudad Deportiva is home to 3 regular size training pitches:

- Ernesto Aparicio training field of natural grass.
- David García Santana training field of natural grass.
- Manuel Betancor training field of artificial turf, designated for the training sessions of UD Las Palmas Atlético and UD Las Palmas C; the reserve teams of the club.

== Seasons ==
=== Season to season ===
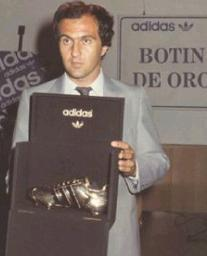
Carlos Morete, the second top scorer in the history of the club after Germán Dévora.

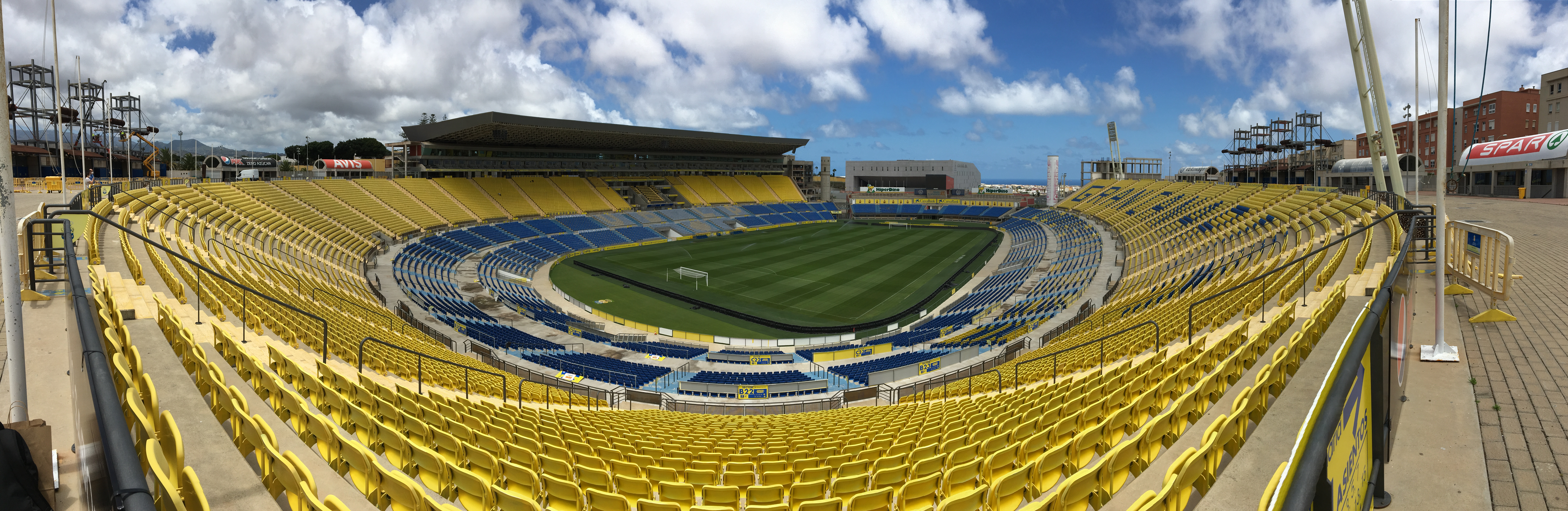
View of the Estadio Gran Canaria.

Season	Tier	Division	Place	Copa del Rey
1949–50	4	1ª Reg.	1st	DNP
1950–51	2	2ª	3rd	DNP
1951–52	1	1ª	15th	DNP
1952–53	2	2ª	4th	Third round
1953–54	2	2ª	1st	Round of 16
1954–55	1	1ª	12th	Round of 16
1955–56	1	1ª	11th	Round of 16
1956–57	1	1ª	10th	Round of 16
1957–58	1	1ª	11th	Quarter-finals
1958–59	1	1ª	14th	Round of 32
1959–60	1	1ª	16th	Round of 32
1960–61	2	2ª	5th	Round of 16
1961–62	2	2ª	4th	First round
1962–63	2	2ª	3rd	Round of 16
1963–64	2	2ª	1st	First round
1964–65	1	1ª	9th	Round of 16
1965–66	1	1ª	10th	Round of 16
1966–67	1	1ª	11th	Round of 16
1967–68	1	1ª	3rd	Round of 16
1968–69	1	1ª	2nd	Round of 16

Season	Tier	Division	Place	Copa del Rey
1969–70	1	1ª	9th	Round of 16
1970–71	1	1ª	14th	Round of 16
1971–72	1	1ª	5th	Round of 16
1972–73	1	1ª	11th	Fifth round
1973–74	1	1ª	11th	Semi-finals
1974–75	1	1ª	13th	Quarter-finals
1975–76	1	1ª	13th	Quarter-finals
1976–77	1	1ª	4th	Round of 16
1977–78	1	1ª	7th	Runners-up
1978–79	1	1ª	6th	Fourth round
1979–80	1	1ª	12th	Third round
1980–81	1	1ª	15th	First round
1981–82	1	1ª	15th	Round of 16
1982–83	1	1ª	16th	Third round
1983–84	2	2ª	11th	Semi-finals
1984–85	2	2ª	1st	Fourth round
1985–86	1	1ª	13th	Fourth round
1986–87	1	1ª	14th	Fourth round
1987–88	1	1ª	20th	Round of 16
1988–89	2	2ª	11th	Round of 32

Season	Tier	Division	Place	Copa del Rey
1989–90	2	2ª	6th	First round
1990–91	2	2ª	15th	Round of 16
1991–92	2	2ª	20th	Fourth round
1992–93	3	2ª B	1st	Fourth round
1993–94	3	2ª B	2nd	Third round
1994–95	3	2ª B	3rd	Fourth round
1995–96	3	2ª B	1st	Second round
1996–97	2	2ª	7th	Semi-finals
1997–98	2	2ª	3rd	Third round
1998–99	2	2ª	6th	Fourth round
1999–00	2	2ª	1st	Second round
2000–01	1	1ª	11th	Round of 32
2001–02	1	1ª	18th	Round of 32
2002–03	2	2ª	5th	Round of 64
2003–04	2	2ª	20th	Round of 64
2004–05	3	2ª B	7th	Round of 64
2005–06	3	2ª B	3rd	Third round
2006–07	2	2ª	18th	Third round
2007–08	2	2ª	8th	Round of 32
2008–09	2	2ª	18th	Second round

Season	Tier	Division	Place	Copa del Rey
2009–10	2	2ª	17th	Third round
2010–11	2	2ª	15th	Second round
2011–12	2	2ª	9th	Second round
2012–13	2	2ª	6th	Round of 16
2013–14	2	2ª	6th	Round of 32
2014–15	2	2ª	4th	Round of 32
2015–16	1	1ª	11th	Quarter-finals
2016–17	1	1ª	14th	Round of 16
2017–18	1	1ª	19th	Round of 16
2018–19	2	2ª	12th	Second round
2019–20	2	2ª	9th	Second round
2020–21	2	2ª	9th	Second round
2021–22	2	2ª	4th	Second round
2022–23	2	2ª	2nd	Second round
2023–24	1	1ª	16th	Round of 32
2024–25	1	1ª	19th	Round of 32
2025–26	2	2ª	5th	First round
2026–27	2	2ª		TBD

- 36 seasons in La Liga
- 35 seasons in Segunda División
- 6 seasons in Segunda División B

=== Recent seasons ===
Season		Pos.	Pld	W	D	L	GF	GA	Pts.	Cup	Notesint
1999–2000	2D	1	42	20	12	10	60	41	72		Promoted
2000–01	1D	11	38	13	7	18	42	62	46		
2001–02	1D	18	38	9	13	16	40	50	40		Relegated
2002–03	2D	5	42	16	16	10	53	43	64		
2003–04	2D	20	42	10	14	18	46	68	44		Relegated
2004–05	2DB	7	38	17	9	12	50	33	60		
2005–06	2DB	3	38	18	13	7	45	24	67		Promoted
2006–07	2D	18	42	13	12	17	51	59	51		
2007–08	2D	8	42	15	12	15	51	55	57		
2008–09	2D	18	42	10	17	15	46	51	47		
2009–10	2D	17	42	12	15	15	49	49	51		
2010–11	2D	15	42	13	15	14	56	71	54		
2011–12	2D	9	42	16	10	16	58	59	58		
2012–13	2D	6	42	18	12	12	62	55	66		
2013–14	2D	6	42	18	9	15	51	50	63		
2014–15	2D	4	42	22	12	8	73	47	78		Promoted
2015–16	1D	11	38	12	8	18	45	53	44		
2016–17	1D	14	38	10	9	19	53	74	39		
2017–18	1D	19	38	5	7	26	24	74	22		Relegated
2018–19	2D	12	42	12	18	12	48	50	54		
2019–20	2D	9	42	14	15	13	49	46	57		
2020–21	2D	9	42	14	14	14	46	53	56		
2021–22	2D	4	42	19	13	10	57	47	70		
2022–23	2D	2	42	18	18	6	49	29	72		Promoted
2023–24	1D	16	38	10	10	18	33	47	40		
2024–25	1D	19	38	8	8	22	40	61	32		Relegated
2025–26	2D	5	42	20	13	9	57	40	73		

== Current squad ==
As of 1 September 2026

Note: Flags indicate national team as defined under FIFA eligibility rules; some limited exceptions apply. Players may hold more than one non-FIFA nationality.

No.	Pos.	Nation	Player
2	DF	ESP	Marvin Park
3	DF	GHA	Nicholas Opoku
4	DF	ESP	Álex Suárez (3rd captain)
5	DF	ESP	Enrique Clemente
6	MF	ESP	Iñaki González
7	FW	ESP	Jefté Betancor
8	MF	ESP	Sergio Ruiz
9	MF	URU	Jeremía Recoba
10	FW	ESP	Jesé
11	FW	JPN	Taisei Miyashiro
12	MF	FRA	Enzo Loiodice
13	GK	ESP	José Antonio Caro
14	MF	ESP	Manu Fuster
15	DF	ESP	Juanma Herzog
16	MF	SLO	Mateo Aćimović

No.	Pos.	Nation	Player
17	MF	ESP	Viti Rozada
18	MF	PAN	Edward Cedeño
19	FW	ESP	Sandro Ramírez (vice-captain)
20	MF	ESP	Kirian Rodríguez (captain)
21	DF	ITA	Giovanni Bonfanti (on loan from Atalanta)
22	FW	ESP	Ale García
23	DF	ESP	Andrés Rodríguez
24	MF	ESP	Iván Jaime (on loan from Porto)
25	DF	ESP	Valentín Pezzolesi
26	MF	BFA	Aboubacar Bassinga
29	FW	ESP	Elías Romero
30	MF	ESP	Iván Medina
31	FW	ESP	Adam Arvelo
32	MF	ESP	Rafa Cruz
35	GK	ESP	Adri Suárez

=== Reserve team ===
Note: Flags indicate national team as defined under FIFA eligibility rules; some limited exceptions apply. Players may hold more than one non-FIFA nationality.

No.	Pos.	Nation	Player
28	MF	ESP	Aimar Domínguez
33	MF	ESP	Jorge Cruz
34	MF	ESP	Sergio Viera
37	FW	ESP	Arturo Rodríguez
38	MF	ESP	Aimar Domínguez

No.	Pos.	Nation	Player
40	DF	ESP	Aidan Pérez
41	GK	ESP	Jorge Valverde
42	DF	MAR	Rachid Saiah
43	GK	ESP	Eduard Mohedano
44	DF	ESP	Adrián Rodríguez

=== Out on loan ===
Note: Flags indicate national team as defined under FIFA eligibility rules; some limited exceptions apply. Players may hold more than one non-FIFA nationality.

No.	Pos.	Nation	Player
—	DF	ESP	Carlos Navarro (at Mirandés until 30 June 2027)
—	DF	ESP	Cristian Gutiérrez (at Cádiz until 30 June 2027)

No.	Pos.	Nation	Player
—	DF	ESP	Víctor Villote (at Gimnàstic until 30 June 2027)

== Current technical staff ==
Position	Staff
Head coach	(Spain) Rubén de la Barrera
Assistant coach	(Spain) Álvaro Cejudo
Fitness coach	(Spain) Adriá Aguirre
Technical assistant	(Spain) Jordi Bacardit
Goalkeeping coach	(Spain) José Yepes
Analyst	(Spain) Jose Igner
Individual development	(Spain) Adrián Martín
Match delegate	(Spain) Rubén Fontes
Equipment manager	(Spain) Alejandro Simón (Spain) Cristian Rodríguez
Doctor	(Spain) Diosdado Ríos Bolaños
Head of physiotherapist	(Spain) Juan Naranjo Hernández
Rehab fitness coach	(Spain) Andrés Pérez Guerra
Physiotherapist	(Spain) David Loro García (Spain) Carlos Vega Sánchez

Last updated: 11 August 2026
Source: UD Las Palmas

== Honours ==
- La Liga

Runners-up (1): 1968–69

- Segunda División

Winners (4): 1953–54, 1963–64, 1984–85, 1999–2000

- Segunda División B

Winners (2): 1992–93, 1995–96

- Copa del Rey

Runners-up (1): 1978

- Teide Trophy

Winners (2): 1987, 2006

== Former players ==
(Spain) Pedri

== List of coaches ==
Since its founding, Unión Deportiva has had 79 coaching changes (including interim coaches). Among those 79, several have coached the team on more than one occasion. In total, 61 different coaches have held the position in the club's history. Pierre Sinibaldi is the coach who has led the most matches with 166 in four full seasons. He is followed by Roque Olsen with 135, Luis Molowny with 130, Juan Manuel Rodríguez with 125, Sergio Krešić with 120, Satur Grech with 113, Paco Castellano with 108 and Vicente Dauder with 104 matches. In terms of sporting achievements, the Gran Canaria team has 9 promotions (7 to Primera and 2 to Segunda). The first promotion was achieved by Arsenio Arocha. The promotions to Primera were chronologically achieved by Arsenio Arocha, Jesús Navarro, Vicente Dauder, Roque Olsen, Sergio Krešić, Paco Herrera, and the most recent by Francisco Javier García Pimienta. The promotions to Segunda were achieved by Pacuco Rosales and Juanito Rodríguez. Regarding the nationalities of the coaches of Unión Deportiva, Spanish coaches predominate, although 9 other different nationalities have occupied the bench.

- (Spain) Satur Grech (1953–57)
- (Spain) Luis Molowny (1957–58)
- (Spain) Baltasar Albéniz (1958–59)
- (Spain) Luis Molowny (1959)
- (France) Marcel Domingo (1959–60)
- (Spain) Paco Campos (1961–62)
- (Spain) Rosendo Hernández (1962–63)
- (Spain) Vicente Dauder (1963–66)
- (Spain) Luis Molowny (1968–70)
- (Spain) Rosendo Hernández (1970)
- (Spain) Héctor Rial (1970–71)
- (France) Pierre Sinibaldi (1971–75)
- (Paraguay) Heriberto Herrera (1975–76)
- (Argentina) Roque Olsen (1976–77)
- (Spain) Miguel Muñoz (1977–79)
- (Spain) Antonio Ruiz (1979–80)
- (Paraguay) Heriberto Herrera (1982)
- (Austria) Walter Skocik (1982–83)
- (Uruguay) Héctor Núñez (1983–84)
- (Argentina) Roque Olsen (1984–85)
- (Hungary) Ferenc Kovács (1986–87)
- (Argentina) Roque Olsen (1988)
- (Spain) Paquito (1989–90)
- (Spain) Manolo Cardo (1990–91)
- (Argentina) Roque Olsen (1991), (1991–92)
- (Argentina) Miguel Ángel Brindisi (1991–92)
- (Spain) Iñaki Sáez (1993–94)
- (Spain) Paco Castellano (1994–95)
- (Spain) Iñaki Sáez (1995)
- (Argentina) Ángel Cappa (1996–97)
- (Spain) Paco Castellano (1997)
- (Spain) Mariano García Remón (1997–98)
- (Spain) Paco Castellano (1998–99)
- (Croatia) Sergije Krešić (1999–01)
- (Spain) Fernando Vázquez (2001–02)
- (Spain) Josu Uribe (2002–03)
- (Spain) Juan Manuel Rodríguez (2003)
- (Spain) David Vidal (2003–04)
- (Spain) David Amaral (2004)
- (Spain) Carlos Sánchez Aguiar (2004–05)
- (Serbia) Josip Višnjić (2005–06)
- (Spain) Carlos Sánchez Aguiar (2006)
- (Spain) Juanito (2006–07)
- (Spain) Juan Manuel Rodríguez (2007–08)
- (Spain) Javier Vidales (2008–09)
- (Spain) Paco Castellano (2009)
- (Croatia) Sergije Krešić (2009–10)
- (Spain) Paco Jémez (2010–11)
- (Spain) Juan Manuel Rodríguez (2011–12)
- (Spain) Sergio Lobera (2012–14)
- (Spain) Josico (2014)
- (Spain) Paco Herrera (2014–15)
- (Spain) Quique Setién (2015–17)
- (Spain) Manolo Márquez (2017)
- (Spain) Pako Ayestarán (2017)
- (Spain) Paco Jémez (2017–18)
- (Spain) Manolo Jiménez (2018)
- (Spain) Paco Herrera (2018–19)
- (Spain) Pepe Mel (2019–22)
- (Spain) García Pimienta (2022–2024)
- (Spain) Luis Carrión (2024)
- (Spain) Diego Martínez (2024–)

== Affiliated teams ==
Las Palmas has used farm teams since 1954, but its official B-team, Las Palmas Atlético, was founded in 1976. A third side was founded in 2006 and reached the highest division of regional football, the Preferente, before folding in 2010 and being re-created the following season.

The club also had a women's team in the top division between 2009 and 2011. In 2010 Las Palmas founded an indoor football team for the Liga de Fútbol Indoor, staging matches at the Centro Insular de Deportes.

== Crest ==
Las Palmas' badge is a blue shield with yellow scrolls on top with the club's name, city and archipelago. The municipal arms, granted by the city's mayor, feature in the centre of the design. Underneath lie the five crests of the clubs which united in 1949 to create the club: from left to right – Victoria, Arenas, Deportivo, Marino and Atlético; a smaller white scroll above them displays the city motto Segura tiene la palma.

In Spanish football, many clubs possess royal patronage and thus are permitted to use the prefix Real in their name and use an image of the Spanish crown. Las Palmas does not have such patronage, but tops its crest with the Spanish crown due to the patronage held by Real Club Victoria.

The crest is the central emblem of the club flag, a horizontal bicolour with yellow on top and blue underneath. The flag of the island of Gran Canaria uses these colours diagonally.
