= UD Las Palmas Atlético =

Spanish football team

Coordinates: 28.102403°N 15.455184°W

Las Palmas Atlético
- Full name: Las Palmas Atlético
- Nickname: La vela chica
- Founded: 1959
- Ground: Anexo al Estadio Gran Canaria, Las Palmas, Canary Islands, Spain
- Capacity: 2,000
- President: Miguel Ángel Ramírez Alonso
- Head coach: Juan Manuel Rodríguez
- League: Segunda Federación – Group 4
- 2025–26: Segunda Federación – Group 5, 11th of 18
Home colours	Away colours

Las Palmas Atlético is the reserve team of UD Las Palmas, club based in Las Palmas, in the autonomous community of the Canary Islands. They play in Segunda Federación – Group 4, holding home games at Anexo del Estadio Gran Canaria, which holds 2,000 spectators.

The team is officially known as Las Palmas Atlético on the club's official promotion and website, but the rules of the Liga de Fútbol Profesional prohibit B teams from having different names to their parent.

== Club background ==
- Unión Athletic Football Club / Unión Atlético Club de Fútbol – (1954–59)
- Unión Deportiva Las Palmas Aficionado – (1959–77)
- Unión Deportiva Las Palmas Atlético – (1977–91)
- Unión Deportiva Las Palmas B – (1991–2008)
- Unión Deportiva Las Palmas Atlético – (2008–)

== Season to season ==
- As a farm team

Season	Tier	Division	Place	Copa del Rey
1954–55	4	1ª Reg.	4th	
1955–56	4	1ª Reg.	2nd	
1956–57	4	1ª Reg.	1st	
1957–58	4	1ª Reg.	4th	
1958–59	4	1ª Reg.	2nd	
1959–60	4	1ª Reg.	2nd	
1960–61	4	1ª Reg.	1st	
1961–62	4	1ª Reg.	4th	
1962–63	4	1ª Reg.	1st	
1963–64	4	1ª Reg.	3rd	
1964–65	4	1ª Reg.	4th	
1965–66	4	1ª Reg.	4th	
1966–67	4	1ª Reg.	4th	
1967–68	4	1ª Reg.	3rd	
1968–69	4	1ª Reg.	1st	
1969–70	4	1ª Reg.	2nd	
1970–71	4	1ª Reg.	3rd	
1971–72	4	1ª Reg.	6th	
1972–73	4	1ª Reg.	2nd	

Season	Tier	Division	Place	Copa del Rey
1973–74	4	1ª Reg.	8th	
1974–75	4	1ª Reg.	4th	
1975–76	4	1ª Reg.	8th	
1976–77	4	1ª Reg.	1st	
1977–78	4	3ª	5th	
1978–79	4	3ª	1st	
1979–80	3	2ª B	9th	
1980–81	3	2ª B	12th	
1981–82	3	2ª B	20th	
1982–83	4	3ª	1st	
1983–84	4	3ª	3rd	
1984–85	4	3ª	7th	
1985–86	4	3ª	2nd	
1986–87	4	3ª	2nd	
1987–88	3	2ª B	17th	
1988–89	4	3ª	2nd	
1989–90	4	3ª	1st	
1990–91	3	2ª B	20th	

- As reserve team

Season	Tier	Division	Place
1991–92	4	3ª	1st
1992–93	4	3ª	5th
1993–94	4	3ª	3rd
1994–95	4	3ª	7th
1995–96	4	3ª	4th
1996–97	4	3ª	9th
1997–98	4	3ª	3rd
1998–99	4	3ª	1st
1999–2000	4	3ª	1st
2000–01	4	3ª	3rd
2001–02	4	3ª	13th
2002–03	4	3ª	4th
2003–04	4	3ª	8th
2004–05	4	3ª	10th
2005–06	4	3ª	13th
2006–07	4	3ª	1st
2007–08	4	3ª	2nd
2008–09	3	2ª B	16th
2009–10	4	3ª	2nd
2010–11	4	3ª	2nd

Season	Tier	Division	Place
2011–12	4	3ª	3rd
2012–13	4	3ª	1st
2013–14	3	2ª B	4th
2014–15	3	2ª B	16th
2015–16	4	3ª	3rd
2016–17	4	3ª	1st
2017–18	3	2ª B	14th
2018–19	3	2ª B	15th
2019–20	3	2ª B	16th
2020–21	3	2ª B	7th / 1st
2021–22	4	2ª RFEF	15th
2022–23	5	3ª Fed.	4th
2023–24	5	3ª Fed.	4th
2024–25	5	3ª Fed.	1st
2025–26	4	2ª Fed.	11th
2026–27	4	2ª Fed.	

- 13 seasons in Segunda División B
- 3 seasons in Segunda Federación/Segunda División RFEF
- 32 seasons in Tercera División
- 3 seasons in Tercera Federación

== Current squad ==
As of 7 September 2026

Note: Flags indicate national team as defined under FIFA eligibility rules; some limited exceptions apply. Players may hold more than one non-FIFA nationality.

No.	Pos.	Nation	Player
1	GK	ESP	Jorge Valverde
2	DF	ESP	Oriol Corominas
3	DF	ESP	Diego Martín
4	DF	ESP	Adrián Trespalacios
5	DF	ESP	Valentino Raca
6	MF	ESP	Sergio Viera
7	FW	ESP	Arturo Rodríguez
8	MF	ESP	Kirian Ramírez
9	FW	ESP	Ian Martínez
10	FW	ESP	Johan Guedes
11	FW	ESP	Sergio Rivarés
12	DF	ESP	Aidan Pérez
13	GK	ESP	Eduard Mohedano

No.	Pos.	Nation	Player
14	MF	ESP	Biel Vicens
15	DF	ESP	Ryan Luis
16	MF	VEN	Josito González
17	FW	ESP	Cacho
18	MF	ESP	Alex Bombardó
19	FW	ESP	Tomás Medina
21	MF	ESP	Jerobe Cáceres
26	DF	ESP	David Suárez
27	MF	ESP	Aimar Domínguez
28	GK	ESP	Alberto Santana
29	DF	MAR	Rachid Saiah
30	MF	ESP	Darío Delgado
31	GK	ESP	Israel Mora

=== Reserve team ===
Note: Flags indicate national team as defined under FIFA eligibility rules; some limited exceptions apply. Players may hold more than one non-FIFA nationality.

No.	Pos.	Nation	Player

=== Current technical staff ===
Position	Staff
Head coach	(Spain) Raúl Martín
Assistant coach	(Spain) Nauzet Alemán
Fitness coach	(Spain) Raúl Herrera
Goalkeeping coach	(Serbia) Željko Cicović
Technical assistant	(Spain) Juan José (Spain) Adrián Martín
Physiotherapist	(Spain) Enrique Fernández
Doctor	(Spain) Víctor Pons
Delegate	(Spain) Tomás Alfonso
Match delegate	(Spain) Norberto Rodríguez
Rehab fitness coach	(Spain) Cristian Nuez
Kit man	(Spain) Alejandro Simón

Last updated: 21 September 2022

== Honours ==
- Tercera División (4th tier) (9): 1978–79, 1982–83, 1989–90, 1991–92, 1998–99, 1999–2000, 2006–07, 2012–13, 2016–17
- Copa Federación de España (1): 1994–95
- Teide Trophy (2): 1979, 1980
