= 2010–11 Segunda División =

80th season of the second-tier football league in Spain

Segunda División
- Season: 2010–11
- Champions: Betis
- Promoted: Betis; Rayo Vallecano; Granada
- Relegated: Salamanca; Tenerife; Ponferradina; Albacete
- Matches: 462
- Goals: 1,220 (2.64 per match)
- Top goalscorer: (Spain) Jonathan Soriano
- Biggest home win: Granada 5–0 Xerez (30 October 2010); Granada 6–1 Gimnàstic (12 December 2010); Alcorcón 5–0 Las Palmas (12 February 2011); Betis 5–0 Cartagena (16 April 2011)
- Biggest away win: Salamanca 0–5 Valladolid (27 March 2011)
- Highest scoring: Numancia 4–6 Barcelona B (26 February 2011)

The 2010–11 Segunda División season (known as the Liga Adelante for sponsorship reasons) was the 80th since its establishment. The first matches of the season were played on 27 August 2010, the regular league ended on 4 June 2011, and the season ended with the promotion play-off finals on 18 June 2011.

The first goal of the season was scored by Javi Guerra, who scored a sixth-minute goal for Real Valladolid against Villarreal B in the early kick-off. The first red card of the season was given to Hernán Pérez from Villarreal B in their opening game against Valladolid. The first hat-trick was scored by Quini in the match between Alcorcón and Girona.

== Teams ==
Real Valladolid, Tenerife and Xerez are the teams which were relegated from La Liga the previous season. Tenerife and Xerez made their immediate return to the second level after just one season in the top division, while Valladolid ended a three-year tenure in La Liga. Real Sociedad was promoted after three consecutive seasons in the second level, Levante was promoted after two seasons and Hércules after 13 seasons, its longest absence from first division.

The teams which were relegated the previous season were Castellón, Real Unión, Murcia and Cádiz. These four were replaced by another four play-off winners from Segunda División B: Granada (2ªB champion), Ponferradina (2ªB runner-up), Barcelona B (play-off winner) and Alcorcón (play-off winner).

=== Stadia and locations ===
Location of (qualified) teams in Segunda División 2010–11
Canary Islands

Team	Home city	Stadium	Capacity
Albacete	Albacete	Carlos Belmonte	17,500
Alcorcón	Alcorcón	Santo Domingo	3,000
Barcelona B	Barcelona	Mini Estadi	15,276
Betis	Seville	Benito Villamarín	55,500
Cartagena	Cartagena	Cartagonova	14,500
Celta Vigo	Vigo	Balaídos	31,800
Córdoba	Córdoba	Nuevo Arcángel	18,280
Elche	Elche	Martínez Valero	36,017
Gimnàstic	Tarragona	Nou Estadi	14,500
Girona	Girona	Montilivi	9,500
Granada	Granada	Nuevo Los Cármenes	16,200
Huesca	Huesca	El Alcoraz	5,300
Las Palmas	Las Palmas de Gran Canaria	Gran Canaria	31,250
Numancia	Soria	Los Pajaritos	9,025
Ponferradina	Ponferrada	El Toralín	8,200
Rayo Vallecano	Madrid	Teresa Rivero	15,500
Recreativo	Huelva	Nuevo Colombino	21,670
Salamanca	Villares de la Reina	El Helmántico	17,341
Tenerife	Santa Cruz de Tenerife	Heliodoro Rodríguez López	23,000
Valladolid	Valladolid	José Zorrilla	26,512
Villarreal B	Vila-real	Ciudad Deportiva	5,000
Xerez	Jerez de la Frontera	Chapín	20,523

=== Personnel and sponsorship ===
Team	Chairman	Head coach	Kitmaker	Shirt sponsor
Albacete	(Spain) Rafael Candel	(Spain) Mario Simón	Joma	Caja Rural
Alcorcón	(Spain) Julián Villena	(Spain) Juan Antonio Anquela	Brocal	CREAA
Barcelona B	(Spain) Sandro Rosell	(Spain) Luis Enrique	Nike	UNICEF^{1}
Betis	(Spain) Rafael Gordillo	(Spain) Pepe Mel	RBb^{2}	Cajasol / SEAT
Cartagena	(Spain) Francisco Gómez	(Spain) Juan Ignacio Martínez	Kelme	Fundación Teatro Romano de Cartagena
Celta Vigo	(Spain) Carlos Mouriño	(Spain) Paco Herrera	Li-Ning	Citroën / Estrella Galicia
Córdoba	(Spain) José Miguel Salinas	(Spain) Lucas Alcaraz	CCF^{2}	CajaSur
Elche	(Spain) José Sepulcre	(Spain) Pepe Bordalás	Rasán	Comunitat Valenciana
Gimnàstic	(Spain) José María Fernández	(Spain) Joan Carles Oliva	N^{2}	Tarragona
Girona	(Spain) Ramon Vilaró	(Spain) Raül Agné	Elements	Costa Brava
Granada	(Spain) Quique Pina	(Spain) Fabri González	Legea	Caja Granada
Huesca	(Spain) Fernando Losfablos	(Spain) Onésimo Sánchez	Bemiser	CAI
Las Palmas	(Spain) Miguel Ángel Ramírez	(Spain) Juan Manuel Rodríguez	KS	Caja de Canarias
Numancia	(Spain) Francisco Rubio	(Spain) Juan Carlos Unzué	Erreà	Caja Duero
Ponferradina	(Spain) José Fernández Nieto	(Spain) Claudio Barragán	Nike	bio3
Rayo Vallecano	(Spain) María Teresa Rivero	(Spain) José Ramón Sandoval	Patrick	Clesa
Recreativo	(Spain) José Miguel de la Corte	(Spain) Carlos Ríos	Cejudo	Cajasol
Salamanca	(Spain) Juan José Pascual	(Spain) Balta Sánchez	Mobel	Caja Duero
Tenerife	(Spain) Miguel Concepción	(Spain) David Amaral	Luanvi	Caja de Canarias
Valladolid	(Spain) Carlos Suárez	(Spain) Abel Resino	Kappa	
Villarreal B	(Spain) Fernando Roig	(Spain) José Francisco Molina	Puma	Aeroport Castelló
Xerez	(Spain) Antonio Millán	(Spain) Javi López	Legea	Cajasol

1. Barcelona B makes a donation to UNICEF in order to display the charity's logo on the club's kit.
2. Club's own brand.

=== Managerial changes ===
Team	Outgoing manager	Manner of departure	Date of vacancy	Replaced by	Date of appointment	Position in table
Valladolid	(Spain) Javier Clemente	End of contract	31 May 2010	(Spain) Antonio Gómez	23 June 2010	18th (in La Liga)
Tenerife	(Spain) José Luis Oltra	End of contract	31 May 2010	(Spain) Gonzalo Arconada	1 July 2010	19th (in La Liga)
Tenerife	(Spain) Gonzalo Arconada	Sacked	20 September 2010	(Spain) Alfredo Merino (as caretaker)	21 September 2010	22nd
Tenerife	(Spain) Alfredo Merino	End of tenure as caretaker	27 September 2010	(Spain) Juan Carlos Mandiá	27 September 2010	22nd
Recreativo	(Spain) Pablo Alfaro	Sacked	17 October 2010	(Spain) Carlos Ríos	18 October 2010	21st
Valladolid	(Spain) Antonio Gómez	Sacked	29 November 2010	(Spain) Javier Torres Gómez (as caretaker)	29 November 2010	7th
Gimnàstic	(Spain) Luis César Sampedro	Sacked	6 December 2010	(Spain) Juan Carlos Oliva	6 December 2010	22nd
Valladolid	(Spain) Javier Torres Gómez	End of tenure as caretaker	6 December 2010	(Spain) Abel Resino	6 December 2010	6th
Ponferradina	(Spain) José Carlos Granero	Sacked	4 January 2011	(Spain) Tomás Nistal (as caretaker)	4 January 2011	20th
Ponferradina	(Spain) Tomás Nistal	End of tenure as caretaker	16 January 2011	(Spain) Claudio Barragán	17 January 2011	21st
Tenerife	(Spain) Juan Carlos Mandiá	Sacked	23 January 2011	(Spain) Antonio Tapia	24 January 2011	22nd
Albacete	(Spain) Antonio Calderón	Sacked	13 February 2011	(Spain) David Vidal	13 February 2011	19th
Salamanca	(Spain) Óscar Cano	Sacked	14 February 2011	(Spain) Pepe Murcia	15 February 2011	19th
Las Palmas	(Spain) Paco Jémez	Sacked	26 February 2011	(Spain) Juan Manuel Rodríguez	26 February 2011	18th
Albacete	(Spain) David Vidal	Sacked	23 March 2011	(Spain) Mario Simón	23 March 2011	21st
Tenerife	(Spain) Antonio Tapia	Sacked	5 April 2011	(Spain) David Amaral	5 April 2011	21st
Salamanca	(Spain) Pepe Murcia	Sacked	11 April 2011	(Spain) Balta Sánchez	11 April 2011	19th
Villarreal B	(Spain) Javi Gracia	Sacked	12 May 2011	(Spain) José Molina	12 May 2011	16th

== League table ==
Pos	Team	Pld	W	D	L	GF	GA	GD	Pts	Promotion, qualification or relegation
1	Betis (C, P)	42	25	8	9	85	44	+41	83	Promotion to La Liga
2	Rayo Vallecano (P)	42	23	10	9	73	48	+25	79	Promotion to La Liga
3	Barcelona B (Note: Barcelona B could not participate in the play-offs as they are Barcelona's reserve team, so the seventh positioned team qualified for the play-offs.)	42	20	11	11	85	62	+23	71	
4	Elche	42	18	15	9	55	42	+13	69	Qualification to promotion play-offs
5	Granada (P)	42	18	14	10	71	47	+24	68	Qualification to promotion play-offs
6	Celta de Vigo	42	17	16	9	62	43	+19	67	Qualification to promotion play-offs
7	Valladolid	42	19	9	14	65	51	+14	66	Qualification to promotion play-offs
8	Xerez	42	17	9	16	60	64	−4	60	
9	Alcorcón	42	17	7	18	57	52	+5	58	
10	Numancia	42	17	6	19	65	63	+2	57 (Note: GIR 2–0 NUM; NUM 4–0 GIR)	
11	Girona	42	15	12	15	58	56	+2	57	
12	Recreativo	42	12	20	10	44	37	+7	56 (Note: REC 3–0 CAR; CAR 1–3 REC)	
13	Cartagena	42	16	8	18	48	63	−15	56	
14	Huesca	42	13	16	13	39	45	−6	55	
15	Las Palmas	42	13	15	14	56	71	−15	54	
16	Córdoba	42	13	13	16	58	63	−5	52	
17	Villarreal B	42	15	6	21	43	63	−20	51	
18	Gimnàstic	42	12	13	17	37	45	−8	49	
19	Salamanca (R)	42	13	7	22	46	68	−22	46	Relegation to Segunda División B
20	Tenerife (R)	42	9	11	22	42	66	−24	38	Relegation to Segunda División B
21	Ponferradina (R)	42	5	19	18	36	63	−27	34	Relegation to Segunda División B
22	Albacete (R)	42	7	11	24	35	64	−29	32	Relegation to Segunda División B

Source: FBref – 2010–2011 Segunda Stats
Rules for classification: 1st points; 2nd head-to-head points; 3rd head-to-head goal difference; 4th head-to-head goals scored; 5th goal difference; 6th number of goals scored; 7th Fair-play points
(C) Champions; (P) Promoted; (R) Relegated

=== Positions by round ===
Team ╲ Round	1	2	3	4	5	6	7	8	9	10	11	12	13	14	15	16	17	18	19	20	21	22	23	24	25	26	27	28	29	30	31	32	33	34	35	36	37	38	39	40	41	42
Betis	1	1	2	1	2	1	3	1	1	1	1	1	1	1	1	1	1	1	1	1	1	1	3	3	3	3	3	3	2	1	2	2	1	1	1	1	1	1	1	1	1	1
Rayo V.	5	3	3	2	1	3	2	3	3	3	2	2	2	2	2	2	2	3	3	3	3	2	1	1	2	2	2	1	1	2	1	1	2	2	2	2	2	2	2	2	2	2
Barcelona B	7	4	11	7	4	7	4	5	6	4	4	4	5	5	4	4	6	6	6	6	7	7	8	8	9	8	6	5	4	4	4	4	3	4	4	4	3	5	6	4	3	3
Elche	8	5	10	13	12	15	11	11	10	11	12	10	13	13	9	7	7	8	10	10	10	10	12	12	10	13	9	7	6	5	5	6	5	5	5	6	6	4	3	5	5	4
Granada	20	22	21	17	16	14	10	10	12	8	9	7	8	10	11	9	8	7	8	7	6	5	5	4	4	4	4	4	5	6	7	5	6	6	6	5	5	3	4	3	4	5
Celta Vigo	17	10	7	6	3	2	1	2	2	2	3	3	3	3	3	3	3	2	2	2	2	3	2	2	1	1	1	2	3	3	3	3	4	3	3	3	4	6	5	6	6	6
Valladolid	3	2	1	5	7	8	7	6	7	5	6	5	6	7	6	10	11	12	12	11	12	15	16	14	14	12	12	11	13	11	9	9	7	7	7	7	7	7	7	7	7	7
Xerez	20	21	15	12	8	6	8	9	8	9	8	12	7	9	10	6	5	4	5	5	4	4	4	6	7	9	10	12	11	9	10	10	12	11	11	9	8	9	8	9	8	8
Alcorcón	12	6	13	8	10	9	9	7	9	10	15	9	12	12	14	16	18	19	18	19	16	14	11	11	12	10	11	10	10	12	14	11	10	8	8	11	13	11	10	8	9	9
Numancia	16	18	19	16	18	16	16	16	13	14	11	15	11	11	13	11	12	10	9	9	9	9	10	10	11	14	15	14	12	13	12	13	11	12	14	15	15	14	13	13	10	10
Girona	4	12	8	10	14	17	17	17	14	15	13	13	15	14	15	14	16	17	14	12	11	13	9	9	8	6	5	6	9	10	8	8	9	9	10	12	10	8	12	12	14	11
Recreativo	18	20	22	20	19	19	20	21	21	22	21	21	21	17	18	15	15	18	19	16	19	18	15	16	16	16	16	16	15	16	15	16	15	14	12	10	12	10	11	11	13	12
Cartagena	1	9	6	9	13	12	14	13	11	13	10	14	10	8	7	5	4	5	4	4	5	8	7	7	6	7	7	8	7	7	6	7	8	10	9	8	9	12	9	10	11	13
Huesca	14	14	16	18	20	20	18	18	18	18	18	19	17	18	17	18	17	14	15	17	14	12	13	15	15	15	13	13	14	15	16	15	13	13	16	13	11	13	14	14	12	14
Las Palmas	6	8	4	3	5	5	6	8	5	7	7	8	9	6	8	12	13	13	16	18	18	17	17	17	17	18	20	20	19	18	17	17	17	17	17	17	17	15	15	15	16	15
Córdoba	11	15	17	19	15	13	15	14	15	16	14	16	16	16	16	17	14	15	17	13	13	11	14	13	13	11	14	15	16	14	13	14	16	15	15	16	16	17	16	16	15	16
Villarreal B	22	13	9	11	9	11	13	12	16	12	16	11	14	15	12	13	10	9	7	8	8	6	6	5	5	5	8	9	8	8	11	12	14	16	13	14	14	16	17	17	17	17
Gimnàstic	15	11	14	15	17	18	19	20	20	20	19	20	19	21	22	22	22	22	20	20	20	20	20	18	18	19	17	17	17	17	18	18	18	18	18	18	18	18	18	18	18	18
Salamanca	9	7	5	4	6	4	5	4	4	6	5	6	4	4	5	8	9	11	11	14	15	16	18	19	19	20	18	18	18	19	19	19	19	19	19	19	19	19	19	19	19	19
Tenerife	19	19	19	22	22	22	22	22	22	21	22	22	22	19	19	20	21	20	22	22	22	21	21	20	21	17	19	19	20	20	20	21	21	21	21	21	20	20	20	20	20	20
Ponferradina	13	17	18	21	21	21	21	19	19	19	20	17	18	20	20	21	20	21	21	21	21	22	22	22	22	22	22	22	22	22	22	22	22	22	22	22	22	21	21	21	21	21
Albacete	10	16	12	14	11	10	12	15	17	17	17	18	20	22	21	19	19	16	13	15	17	19	19	21	20	21	21	21	21	21	21	20	20	20	20	20	21	22	22	22	22	22

Leader
2011–12 La Liga
2011 promotion play-off
Relegation to 2011–12 Segunda División B

Source: FBref – 2010–2011 Segunda Stats

== Results ==
Home \ Away	ALB	ADA	BAR	BET	CAR	CEL	CÓR	ELC	GIM	GIR	GCF	HUE	LPA	NUM	PNF	RVA	REC	SAL	TEN	VLD	VIL	XER
Albacete	—	1–1	2–2	2–1	1–2	0–1	1–0	0–2	0–1	1–1	2–1	3–1	0–1	1–2	0–1	1–1	1–1	1–0	1–2	1–1	0–2	1–1
Alcorcón	2–0	—	1–3	3–3	0–0	1–0	2–1	0–1	1–1	3–1	2–0	0–1	5–0	3–1	2–0	2–0	2–1	4–0	3–2	1–0	1–2	3–1
Barcelona B	2–1	2–0	—	0–3	3–0	1–1	4–1	2–0	4–0	1–2	4–0	0–1	3–5	1–0	1–1	1–2	1–1	5–1	3–1	0–0	4–1	2–1
Betis	2–0	3–0	2–2	—	5–0	1–1	3–1	1–4	1–0	2–1	4–1	3–1	4–1	4–1	3–0	4–0	0–1	1–0	3–1	2–1	2–1	3–1
Cartagena	1–1	1–0	5–1	2–1	—	0–4	1–2	0–1	2–2	1–0	2–1	2–0	5–2	1–0	1–1	2–4	1–3	1–0	1–0	1–1	2–0	1–2
Celta de Vigo	3–1	3–0	1–2	1–1	3–0	—	3–2	2–2	1–0	0–4	1–1	1–2	2–0	4–0	1–1	0–0	0–3	1–0	1–0	1–2	0–1	1–1
Córdoba	5–1	1–4	2–0	1–1	2–0	0–0	—	0–0	1–0	1–1	1–1	2–0	2–0	1–2	3–3	2–3	3–3	2–0	2–2	1–0	0–0	0–2
Elche	1–0	1–0	2–1	0–2	1–2	1–3	2–1	—	1–0	0–0	0–0	3–0	2–2	1–0	2–0	1–1	1–0	3–1	1–0	2–2	0–0	4–1
Gimnàstic	2–1	2–0	1–1	3–1	2–0	1–2	1–1	0–0	—	2–0	0–3	0–0	0–0	1–0	0–0	0–1	0–0	2–0	1–1	1–0	1–2	0–2
Girona	3–0	3–1	0–2	0–1	1–1	1–1	2–1	2–2	2–1	—	2–0	3–1	1–1	2–0	3–0	1–3	0–0	1–1	4–2	2–0	2–3	4–2
Granada	3–0	1–0	4–1	3–0	2–1	1–1	1–1	3–3	6–1	2–1	—	2–0	5–2	2–0	2–0	1–1	2–1	0–1	2–1	0–1	3–0	5–0
Huesca	1–0	3–1	1–1	1–1	0–0	1–2	2–0	2–2	1–1	0–1	0–0	—	0–0	0–0	1–0	4–1	1–1	0–1	0–0	1–0	3–0	1–1
Las Palmas	2–1	4–1	2–2	2–2	2–0	1–1	0–1	2–1	3–2	1–1	1–1	1–1	—	0–0	1–0	2–1	1–1	2–1	1–0	2–0	2–2	0–3
Numancia	0–1	2–1	4–6	1–2	2–0	1–3	1–1	2–0	1–0	4–0	3–2	3–1	4–0	—	3–0	0–3	1–2	3–2	2–1	3–3	2–1	3–0
Ponferradina	2–1	1–2	2–2	1–1	1–2	0–0	3–0	0–1	1–1	1–1	0–0	0–0	3–2	0–4	—	0–1	1–1	3–2	1–1	1–1	1–5	1–2
Rayo Vallecano	3–3	1–0	2–3	1–0	3–1	1–3	4–2	1–2	1–1	2–0	1–1	4–0	2–0	3–2	3–1	—	0–0	1–2	1–0	3–0	3–0	3–0
Recreativo	0–0	0–0	1–1	1–3	3–0	1–1	2–1	0–0	1–0	4–0	0–0	0–1	1–1	1–0	1–1	1–1	—	0–2	3–0	0–1	2–0	1–1
Salamanca	1–0	1–1	2–3	0–3	2–0	1–1	1–1	5–4	1–0	1–0	1–2	1–1	4–2	2–2	2–2	0–1	0–1	—	1–2	0–5	1–0	2–3
Tenerife	0–1	1–0	1–4	0–3	1–1	0–2	1–2	1–0	0–2	3–3	2–2	0–1	1–1	1–1	1–1	2–1	1–0	1–2	—	3–2	0–1	2–1
Valladolid	1–1	2–0	2–1	1–0	0–1	3–2	5–1	2–0	1–0	1–0	2–3	2–0	3–0	4–5	2–1	2–2	4–0	1–0	2–2	—	3–0	2–1
Villarreal B	1–0	1–4	2–3	1–0	2–0	2–2	0–3	1–1	0–2	0–1	2–1	1–1	0–3	1–0	1–0	1–2	2–0	0–1	0–2	2–0	—	1–2
Xerez	4–2	0–0	1–0	2–3	1–4	2–1	1–3	0–0	1–2	3–1	1–1	1–3	2–1	1–0	0–0	0–1	1–1	2–0	2–0	4–0	3–1	—

Source: BDFutbol
Legend: Blue = home team win; Yellow = draw; Red = away team win.

== Promotion play-offs ==
This season a new promotion phase (known as Promoción de ascenso) was introduced to determine the third team which promoted to 2011–12 La Liga. Teams placed between third and sixth position (excluding reserve teams) took part in the promotion play-offs. Fifth placed faced against the fourth, while the sixth positioned team faced against the third. The first leg of the semi-finals was played on 8–9 June 2011 with the best positioned team playing at home on the second leg which was played on 11–12 June 2011. The final was also two-legged, with the first leg on 15 June 2011 and the second leg on 18 June 2011 with the best positioned team also playing at home on the second leg. Elche and Granada played the final phase, where Granada CF was promoted to La Liga for the first time in 35 years, having spent 26 of them in Segunda División B and Tercera División. Celta Vigo and Valladolid were eliminated in semi-finals. Barcelona B could not participate in the play-offs as they are Barcelona's reserve team.

=== Play-offs ===
Semi-finals
6	Celta Vigo	1	0	1 (4)
5	Granada (aet)	0	1	1 (5) (p)
7	Valladolid	1	1	2
4	Elche	0	3	3

Final
5	Granada (a)	0	1	1
4	Elche	0	1	1

==== Semi-finals ====
===== First leg =====
8 June 2011	Celta Vigo	1–0	Granada	Vigo
21:00 CEST	Michu 78'	(Report)		Stadium: Balaídos; Attendance: 22,000; Referee: Carlos del Cerro Grande

9 June 2011	Valladolid	1–0	Elche	Valladolid
21:00 CEST	Guerra 59'	(Report)		Stadium: José Zorrilla; Attendance: 25,000; Referee: Pedro Jesús Pérez Montero

===== Second leg =====
11 June 2011	Granada	1–0 (a.e.t.) (1–1 agg.) (5–4 p)	Celta Vigo	Granada
21:00 CEST	Orellana 21'	(Report)		Stadium: Nuevo Los Cármenes; Attendance: 16,000; Referee: José Luis Lesma López
	Penalties
	Orellana (penalty scored); Calvo (penalty missed); Abel (penalty scored); Benítez (penalty scored); Pérez (penalty scored); Roberto (penalty scored)		(penalty scored) Trashorras; (penalty scored) López; (penalty scored) Aspas; (penalty scored) De Lucas; (penalty missed) Michu; (penalty missed) Catalá

12 June 2011	Elche	3–1 (3–2 agg.)	Valladolid	Elche (Alicante)
21:00 CEST	Albácar 44', 45'; Ángel 57'	(Report)	22' Óscar	Stadium: Martínez Valero; Attendance: 25,000; Referee: Julio Amoedo Chas

==== Final ====
===== First leg =====
15 June 2011	Granada	0–0	Elche	Granada
21:00 CEST		(Report)		Stadium: Nuevo Los Cármenes; Attendance: 16,200; Referee: Alfonso Pino Zamorano

===== Second leg =====
18 June 2011	Elche	1–1 (1–1a agg.)	Granada	Elche (Alicante)
21:00 CEST	Xumetra 82'	(Report)	28' Ighalo	Stadium: Martínez Valero; Attendance: 36,000; Referee: David Miranda Torres

== Pichichi Trophy for Top Goalscorers ==
Last updated 4 June 2011

Goalscorers	Goals	Penalties	Team
(Spain) Jonathan Soriano	32	4	Barcelona B
(Spain) Javi Guerra	27	0	Valladolid
(Spain) Rubén Castro	25	4	Betis
(Switzerland) Alexandre Geijo	24	0	Granada
(Spain) Quini	22	5	Alcorcón
(Argentina) Emiliano Armenteros	20	3	Rayo Vallecano
(Spain) Jorge Molina	18	1	Betis
(Serbia) Ranko Despotović	18	0	Girona
(Spain) David Rodríguez	17	0	Celta de Vigo
(Spain) José Mari	17	0	Xerez
(Spain) Nino	17	2	Tenerife

== Zamora Trophy for Top Goalkeepers ==
Last updated 4 June 2011

Goalkeeper	Goals	Matches	Average	Team
(Spain) Andrés Fernández	26	31	0.84	Huesca
(Spain) Ismael Falcón	28	33	0.85	Celta Vigo
(Spain) Fabricio Agosto	36	40	0.9	Recreativo
(Spain) Rubén Pérez	39	41	0.95	Gimnàstic
(Spain) Roberto	43	39	1.1	Granada
(Spain) David Cobeño	40	34	1.18	Rayo Vallecano
(Spain) Roberto Santamaría	39	32	1.22	Girona
(Spain) Manu Herrera	42	34	1.24	Alcorcón
(Costa Rica) Keylor Navas	49	36	1.36	Albacete
(Spain) Kiko Casilla	49	35	1.4	Cartagena

== Fair Play award ==
This award is given annually since 1999 to the team with the best fair play during the season. This ranking takes into account aspects such as cards, suspension of matches, audience behaviour and other penalties. This section not only aims to know this aspect, but also serves to break the tie in teams that are tied in all the other rules: points, head-to-head, goal difference and goals scored.

Rank	Team	Games	Points
1	Barcelona B	42	102
2	Numancia	42	116
3	Gimnàstic	42	117
4	Villarreal B	42	130
5	Celta Vigo	42	139
6	Albacete	42	141
7	Córdoba	42	142
8	Girona	42	147
9	Ponferradina	42	148
9	Salamanca	42	148
11	Valladolid	42	150
12	Recreativo	42	158
13	Alcorcón	42	160
13	Cartagena	42	160
15	Huesca	42	161
16	Betis	42	162
17	Granada	42	163
18	Xerez	42	167
19	Las Palmas	42	169
20	Tenerife	42	170
21	Rayo Vallecano	42	174
22	Elche	42	207

- Source: Guia As de La Liga 2011–12, p. 164 (sports magazine)

== Season statistics ==
=== Scoring ===
- First goal of the season: Javi Guerra for Real Valladolid against Villarreal B (27 August 2010)
- Fastest goal in a match: 42 seconds – Cala for Cartagena against Las Palmas (19 December 2010)
- Goal scored at the latest point in a match: 90+5 minutes
  - Ranko Despotović for Girona against Barcelona B (8 January 2011)
  - Andrija Delibašić for Rayo Vallecano against Las Palmas (23 April 2011)
  - Quini for Alcorcó against Granada (15 May 2011)
- Widest winning margin: 5
  - Granada 5–0 Xerez (30 October 2010)
  - Granada 6–1 Gimnàstic (12 December 2010)
  - Alcorcón 5–0 Las Palmas (12 February 2011)
  - Salamanca 0–5 Valladolid (27 March 2011)
  - Betis 5–0 Cartagena (16 April 2011)
- Most goals in a match: 10 – Numancia 4–6 Barcelona B (26 February 2011)
- First hat-trick of the season: Quini for Alcorcón against Girona (18 September 2010)
- First own goal of the season: Albert Serra for Tenerife against Girona (28 August 2010)
- Most goals by one player in a single match: 4 – Alexandre Geijo for Granada against Barcelona B (13 November 2010)
- Most goals by one team in a match: 6
  - Granada 6–1 Gimnàstic (12 December 2010)
  - Numancia 4–6 Barcelona B (26 February 2011)
- Most goals in one half by one team: 5
  - Alcorcón 5–0 Las Palmas (12 February 2011)
  - Numancia 4–6 Barcelona B (26 February 2011)
  - Salamanca 0–5 Valladolid (27 March 2011)
- Most goals scored by losing team: 4
  - Valladolid 4–5 Numancia (11 December 2010)
  - Numancia 4–6 Barcelona B (26 February 2011)
  - Salamanca 5–4 Elche (30 April 2011)

=== Cards ===
- First yellow card: Natxo Insa for Villarreal B against Valladolid (27 August 2010)
- First red card: Hernán Pérez for Villarreal B against Valladolid (27 August 2010)

== Teams by autonomous community ==
	Autonomous community	Number of teams	Teams
1	Andalusia	5	Betis, Córdoba, Granada, Recreativo and Xerez
2	Castile and León	4	Numancia, Ponferradina, Salamanca and Valladolid
3	Catalonia	3	Barcelona B, Gimnàstic and Girona
4	Canary Islands	2	Las Palmas and Tenerife
4	Madrid	2	Alcorcón and Rayo Vallecano
4	Valencia	2	Elche and Villarreal B
7	Aragon	1	Huesca
7	Castile-La Mancha	1	Albacete
7	Galicia	1	Celta
7	Murcia	1	Cartagena

== See also ==
- List of Spanish football transfers summer 2010
- List of Spanish football transfers winter 2010–11
- 2010–11 La Liga
- 2010–11 Segunda División B
- 2010–11 Copa del Rey
