= 2003–04 CD Tenerife season =

CD Tenerife
2003–04 season
- President: Víctor Pérez Ascanio
- Head coach: David Amaral; Martín Marrero
- Stadium: Estadio Heliodoro Rodríguez López
- Segunda División: 8th
- Copa del Rey: Round of 64
- Top goalscorer: League: Keko (17); All: Keko (17)

The 2003–04 season was the 92nd season in the history of CD Tenerife and the club's second consecutive season in the second division of Spanish football. In addition to the domestic league, CD Tenerife participated in this season's edition of the Copa del Rey.

== Competitions ==
=== Overall record ===
Competition	First match	Last match	Starting round	Final position	Record							
Competition	First match	Last match	Starting round	Final position	Pld	W	D	L	GF	GA	GD	Win %
Segunda División	31 August 2003	19 June 2004	Matchday 1	8th	42	11	21	10	40	40	+0	26.19
Copa del Rey	8 October 2003		Round of 64	Round of 64	1	0	0	1	0	1	−1	0.00
Total					43	11	21	11	40	41	−1	25.58

Source: BDFutbol

=== Segunda División ===
==== League table ====
Pos	Team	Pld	W	D	L	GF	GA	GD	Pts
6	Recreativo	42	14	20	8	45	34	+11	62
7	Cádiz	42	17	10	15	52	47	+5	61
8	Tenerife	42	11	21	10	40	40	0	54 (Note: XER 0-0 TEN; TEN 2-1 XER)
9	Xerez	42	12	18	12	47	49	−2	54
10	Eibar	42	12	16	14	44	39	+5	52

Source: LFP - Liga Adelante
Rules for classification: 1st points; 2nd head-to-head points; 3rd head-to-head goal difference; 4th head-to-head goals scored; 5th goal difference; 6th number of goals scored; 7th Fair-play points

==== Results summary ====
Overall								Home						Away					
Pld	W	D	L	GF	GA	GD	Pts	W	D	L	GF	GA	GD	W	D	L	GF	GA	GD
0	0	0	0	0	0	0	0	0	0	0	0	0	0	0	0	0	0	0	0

Source: BDFutbol

==== Results by round ====
Round	1	2	3	4	5	6	7	8	9	10	11	12	13	14	15	16	17	18	19	20	21	22	23	24	25	26	27	28	29	30	31	32	33	34	35	36	37	38	39	40	41	42
Ground	H	A	H	A	H	A	H	A	H	A	H	A	H	A	H	A	A	H	A	H	A	A	H	A	H	A	H	A	H	A	H	A	H	A	H	A	H	H	A	H	A	H
Result	W	D	W	D	D	D	D	D	L	D	W	L	D	L	D	D	L	L	D	L	L	D	D	D	W	D	W	L	W	L	D	D	W	D	W	W	D	D	W	W	D	L
Position	8	6	3	5	5	4	5	5	9	9	7	11	11	13	12	13	14	16	18	20	20	20	21	20	20	20	19	21	17	19	19	19	16	16	14	13	10	10	10	8	8	8

Source: BDFutbol
A = Away; H = Home; W = Win; D = Draw; L = Loss

==== Matches ====
31 August 2003 1	Tenerife	1–0	Alavés	Santa Cruz de Tenerife
--:-- CEST (UTC+2)

7 September 2003 2	Algeciras	1–1	Tenerife	Algeciras
--:-- CEST (UTC+2)

13 September 2001 3	Tenerife	2–1	Recreativo	Santa Cruz de Tenerife
--:-- CEST (UTC+2)

21 September 2001 4	Córdoba	1–1	Tenerife	Córdoba
--:-- CEST (UTC+2)

28 September 2001 5	Tenerife	1–1	Salamanca	Santa Cruz de Tenerife
--:-- CEST (UTC+2)

4 October 2003 6	Las Palmas	1–1	Tenerife	Las Palmas
--:-- CEST (UTC+2)

11 October 2003 7	Tenerife	1–1	Levante	Santa Cruz de Tenerife
--:-- CEST (UTC+2)

19 October 2003 8	Xerez	0–0	Tenerife	Jerez de la Frontera
--:-- CEST (UTC+2)

26 October 2003 9	Tenerife	0–1	Poli Ejido	Santa Cruz de Tenerife
--:-- CEST (UTC+2)

1 November 2003 10	Terrassa	1–1	Tenerife	Terrassa
--:-- CEST (UTC+2)

22 February 2004 25	Tenerife	1–0	Córdoba	Santa Cruz de Tenerife
--:-- CEST (UTC+2)

28 February 2004 26	Salamanca	2–2	Tenerife	Salamanca
--:-- CEST (UTC+2)

7 March 2004 27	Tenerife	2–0	Las Palmas	Santa Cruz de Tenerife
--:-- CEST (UTC+2)

13 March 2004 28	Levante	1–0	Tenerife	Valencia
--:-- CEST (UTC+2)

21 March 2004 29	Tenerife	2–1	Xerez	Santa Cruz de Tenerife
--:-- CEST (UTC+2)

28 March 2004 30	Poli Ejido	1–0	Tenerife	El Ejido
--:-- CEST (UTC+2)

4 April 2004 31	Tenerife	0–0	Terrassa	Santa Cruz de Tenerife
--:-- CEST (UTC+2)

10 April 2004 32	Rayo Vallecano	1–1	Tenerife	Madrid
--:-- CEST (UTC+2)

17 April 2004 33	Tenerife	2–1	Elche	Santa Cruz de Tenerife
--:-- CEST (UTC+2)

24 April 2004 34	Leganés	0–0	Tenerife	Leganés
--:-- CEST (UTC+2)

2 May 2004 35	Tenerife	1–0	Numancia	Santa Cruz de Tenerife
--:-- CEST (UTC+2)

8 May 2004 36	Ciudad de Murcia	2–3	Tenerife	Murcia
--:-- CEST (UTC+2)

16 May 2004 37	Tenerife	1–1	Eibar	Santa Cruz de Tenerife
--:-- CEST (UTC+2)

22 May 2004 38	Tenerife	2–2	Cádiz	Santa Cruz de Tenerife
--:-- CEST (UTC+2)

29 May 2004 39	Sporting Gijón	0–2	Tenerife	Gijón
--:-- CEST (UTC+2)

6 June 2004 40	Tenerife	2–0	Almería	Santa Cruz de Tenerife
--:-- CEST (UTC+2)

13 June 2004 41	Málaga B	2–2	Tenerife	Málaga
--:-- CEST (UTC+2)

19 June 2004 42	Tenerife	3–5	Getafe	Santa Cruz de Tenerife
--:-- CEST (UTC+2)

=== Copa del Rey ===
8 October 2003 Round of 64	Tenerife	0–1 (a.e.t.)	Cádiz	Santa Cruz de Tenerife
--:-- CEST (UTC+2)
