= Gabri De Vuyst =

Spanish footballer

Personal information
- Full name: Gabriel Lozano De Vuyst
- Date of birth: 6 July 2004 (age 22)
- Place of birth: Puerto del Rosario, Spain
- Height: 1.87 m (6 ft 2 in)
- Position: Goalkeeper

Team information
- Current team: Tenerife
- Number: 40

Youth career
- Corralejo
- Los Toscones
- Herbania
- 2018–2020: Valladolid
- 2020–2021: Mallorca
- 2021–2022: San Francisco
- 2022–2023: Tenerife

Senior career*
Years	Team	Apps	(Gls)
2021	Mallorca B	1	(0)
2023–2024	Tenerife C	7	(0)
2024–2025	Tenerife B	3	(0)
2025–	Tenerife	5	(0)
- * Club domestic league appearances and goals as of 2 November 2026

Gabriel "Gabri" Lozano De Vuyst (born 6 July 2004) is a Spanish footballer who plays as a goalkeeper for CD Tenerife.

== Career ==
Born in Puerto del Rosario, Canary Islands to a Spanish father and a Belgian mother, De Vuyst represented local sides CD Corralejo, AD Los Toscones and CD Herbania before joining the youth sides of Real Valladolid. In 2020, he moved to RCD Mallorca, and made his the reserves on 23 May 2021, starting in a 2–0 Tercera División home loss to CE Manacor.

In 2022, after a year at affiliate side CD San Fernando, De Vuyst left Mallorca and returned to his native region, signing for CD Tenerife and returning to youth setup. He would later represent the latter's C and B-teams before being promoted to the main squad for the 2025–26 season in Primera Federación, and signing a new two-year contract on 4 September 2025.

Mainly a backup to Dani Martín, De Vuyst featured in seven matches overall during the campaign, as Tete returned to Segunda División at first attempt. He made his professional debut on 2 November 2026, coming on as a late substitute for field player Noel López in a 2–2 home draw against FC Andorra, as Dani Martín was sent off, but the match was suspended on stoppage time due to the incident with Jesús de Miguel.

== Personal life ==
De Vuyst's father Jero was also a footballer and a goalkeeper. He never played in any higher than Segunda División B, representing CD Corralejo and UD Fuerteventura in that category.
