= Alfredo Merino =

Spanish football manager (born 1969)

Personal information
- Full name: Alfredo Merino Tamayo
- Date of birth: 13 May 1969 (age 57)
- Place of birth: Palencia, Spain
- Position: Midfielder

Senior career*
Years	Team	Apps	(Gls)
- Palencia
–1993	Venta de Baños		

Managerial career
- 1994–1996: Becerril
- 1996: Palencia
- 1997–2001: Castile and León
- 2001–2002: Spain U21 (assistant)
- 2002–2003: Palencia
- 2005–2006: Valladolid B
- 2006: Valladolid
- 2006–2007: Atlético Madrid B
- 2007–2008: Valladolid B
- 2009–2011: Tenerife B
- 2010: Tenerife (interim)
- * Club domestic league appearances and goals

Alfredo Merino Tamayo (born 13 May 1969) is a Spanish retired footballer, and a current manager.

== Managerial career ==
Born in Palencia, Castile and León, Merino retired from professional football aged only 24 due to injuries, and began his managerial career with CD Becerril in the regional leagues. After a short stint with CF Palencia in Segunda División B, he was appointed manager of the Castile-León Football Federation, and was also Iñaki Sáenz's assistant at Spain under-21.

After another spell at Palencia Merino was appointed Real Valladolid B manager in the 2005 summer. On 20 February 2006 he was appointed at the helm of the main squad, replacing fired Marcos Alonso.

Merino was named Atlético Madrid B manager on 23 January 2007, taking the club out of the relegation zones. He subsequently returned to Valladolid and its reserve team, finishing 14th in his only season in charge.

On 15 July 2009 Merino was appointed at the helm of CD Tenerife B. On 20 September of the following year, after Gonzalo Arconada's dismissal, he was named interim manager of the first team, staying in charge for one match before the arrival of Juan Carlos Mandiá.
