= Pablo Paz =

Argentine footballer (born 1973)

Personal information
- Full name: Pablo Ariel Paz Gallo
- Date of birth: 27 January 1973 (age 53)
- Place of birth: Bahía Blanca, Argentina
- Height: 1.81 m (5 ft 11 in)
- Position: Centre-back

Team information
- Current team: Tenerife (youth)

Youth career
- –1992: Newell's Old Boys

Senior career*
Years	Team	Apps	(Gls)
1992–1995	Newell's Old Boys	37	(3)
1995–1996	Banfield	22	(2)
1996–2002	Tenerife	107	(8)
2003	Independiente	1	(0)
2003–2004	Valladolid	9	(0)
2005	Atlético Paso		
2005–2006	Castillo	30	(0)
2006	Motril	6	(1)
2007	Cerro Reyes	16	(0)
2007–2008	Vera		
2011	Gara		
2013	San Andrés		

International career
1996–1998	Argentina	14	(1)

Managerial career
- 2013–2014: San Andrés
- 2014–: Tenerife (youth)
Medal record
Men's football
Representing Argentina
Pan American Games
Gold medal – first place	1995 Mar del Plata	Team
Olympic Games
Silver medal – second place	1996 Atlanta	Team
- * Club domestic league appearances and goals

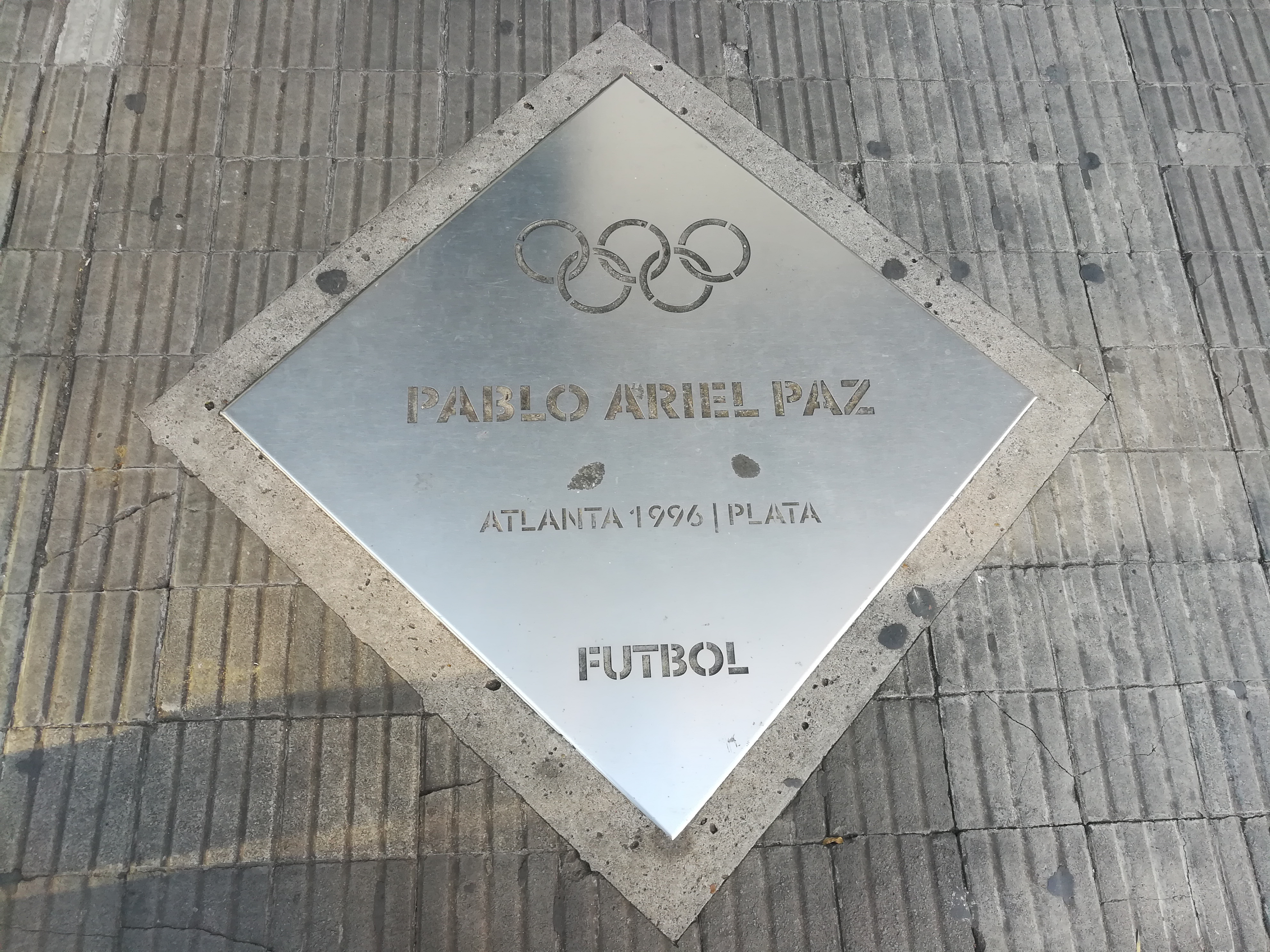
Walk of the Olympics on Pellegrini Avenue

Pablo Ariel Paz Gallo (born 27 January 1973) is an Argentine former professional footballer who played as a central defender.

In a career that spanned 15 years, he played more in Spain than in his homeland, notably with Tenerife for which he appeared in 127 competitive games.

Paz represented Argentina at the 1998 World Cup.

== Club career ==
Paz was born in Bahía Blanca, Buenos Aires. During his professional career he played for Newell's Old Boys, Banfield, Tenerife (his most fruitful period, playing in four La Liga seasons and also reaching the UEFA Cup), Independiente and Real Valladolid; in February 2001, he had an unsuccessful trial with Premier League club Everton.

Paz retired from the game altogether in 2013 at the age of 40, after several years in Spain's lower leagues and its amateur football. He started his managerial career with amateurs San Andrés, returning to Tenerife in the summer of 2014 and taking charge of the youth sides.

== International career ==
Paz earned 14 caps for the Argentina national team in two years, his debut coming in 1996. He was part of the squad that appeared in the 1998 FIFA World Cup and, as the nation was already qualified, he played in the last group stage match against Croatia, a 1–0 win.

Additionally, Paz represented his country at the 1996 Summer Olympics, featuring twice in an eventual silver medal conquest.

== Personal life ==
He is the father of Como player Nico Paz.
