= Sesé Rivero =

Rivero, Sese

Personal information
- Full name: Juan José Rivero Rodríguez
- Date of birth: 3 October 1969 (age 57)
- Place of birth: Puerto de la Cruz, Spain

Youth career
- Years: Team
- Puerto Cruz

Managerial career
- 1995–1997: Realejos (assistant)
- 1997–1998: Corralejo (assistant)
- 2003–2004: Tenerife (assistant)
- 2006: Tenerife (assistant)
- 2012: Tenerife B
- 2019: Tenerife (interim)

Juan José "Sesé" Rivero Rodríguez (born 3 October 1969) is a Spanish football manager, and currently works as a youth football coordinator at CD Tenerife.

== Career ==
Born in Puerto de la Cruz, Tenerife, Canary Islands, Rivero played youth football for CD Puerto Cruz, but retired at early age. In 1998, after acting as David Amaral's assistant at UD Realejos and CD Corralejo, he joined CD Tenerife as a fitness coach.

Rivero was named Amaral's assistant at Tete for the 2003–04 season. In January 2004, as Amaral was sacked, he remained at the club but assigned to the youth squads.

Rivero was again named Amaral's assistant in January 2006, also at Tenerife. After Amaral left, he returned to his previous role as a director of the youth squads. In 2012, he also acted as an interim manager of the B-team for the latter stages of the season.

On 17 November 2019, Rivero replaced sacked Aritz López Garai at the helm of Tenerife's first team. His first professional match in charge occurred five days later, a 2–0 away defeat of Sporting de Gijón.

On 2 December 2019, after the appointment of Rubén Baraja as manager, Rivero returned to his previous role.

== Personal life ==
Rivero's younger brother Fabián is also a manager, who also worked at Tenerife for many years.

== Managerial statistics ==
As of match played 30 November 2019

Managerial record by team and tenure
Team	Nat	From	To	Record								Ref
Team	Nat	From	To	G	W	D	L	GF	GA	GD	Win %	Ref
Tenerife (interim)	(Spain)	17 November 2019	2 December 2019	2	1	0	1	3	3	+0	50.00	
Total				2	1	0	1	3	3	+0	50.00	—
