= Fabricio (footballer, born 1998) =

Brazilian footballer (born 1998)

Personal information
- Full name: Fabricio Assis de Souza Barbosa
- Date of birth: 27 January 1998 (age 28)
- Place of birth: Belém, Brazil
- Height: 1.70 m (5 ft 7 in)
- Position: Midfielder

Team information
- Current team: Tenerife
- Number: 15

Youth career
- 2005–2015: Paysandu
- 2017: Pinheirense

Senior career*
Years	Team	Apps	(Gls)
2018	Desportiva Paraense		
2020–2022	Alcorcón B	36	(1)
2022–2023	Lanzarote	26	(4)
2023–2024	Tenerife B	28	(2)
2024–2025	Unión Sur Yaiza	32	(4)
2025–	Tenerife	31	(3)
- * Club domestic league appearances and goals as of 16 August 2026

Fabricio Assis de Souza Barbosa (born 27 January 1998), simply known as Fabricio, is a Brazilian professional footballer who plays as a midfielder for Spanish club CD Tenerife. He also holds a Spanish passport.

== Career ==
Born in Belém, Pará, Fabricio represented local sides Pinheirense and Desportiva Paraense and worked in a tire shop before being spotted by a Spanish agent. He moved to Spain in February 2020 to play for AD Alcorcón's B-team, but was unable to be registered until November.

Fabricio suffered a knee injury shortly after, being sidelined for the remainder of the season, but became a regular starter upon returning. On 10 August 2022, he moved to Tercera Federación side UD Lanzarote.

After again being a first-choice, Fabricio moved to another reserve team, CD Tenerife B also in the fifth tier, on 16 August 2023. Despite impressing with the side, he was unable to make a breakthrough in the first team as he was not an under-23 player, and signed for CD Unión Sur Yaiza in Segunda Federación on 5 July 2024.

On 14 July 2025, Fabricio returned to Tete, now being a member of the main squad in Primera Federación. Initially a backup option, he soon established himself as a regular starter, and renewed his contract until 2028 on 5 February 2026.

Fabricio made his professional debut on 16 August 2026, coming on as a second-half substitute for Juanjo Sánchez in a 3–1 away win over SD Eibar.

== Career statistics ==
As of match played 16 August 2026

Appearances and goals by club, season and competition
Club	Season	League			Cup		Other		Total	
Club	Season	Division	Apps	Goals	Apps	Goals	Apps	Goals	Apps	Goals
Alcorcón B	2020–21	Tercera División	3	0	—		—		3	0
Alcorcón B	2021–22	Tercera División RFEF	33	1	—		3 (Note: Appearance(s) in Tercera División RFEF play-offs)	0	36	1
Alcorcón B	Total		36	1	—		3	0	39	1
Lanzarote	2022–23	Tercera Federación	26	4	—		2	0	28	4
Tenerife B	2023–24	Tercera Federación	28	2	—		—		28	2
Unión Sur Yaiza	2024–25	Segunda Federación	32	4	—		—		32	4
Tenerife	2025–26	Primera Federación	30	3	1	0	—		31	3
Tenerife	2026–27	Segunda División	1	0	0	0	—		1	0
Tenerife	Total		31	3	1	0	—		32	3
Career total			153	14	1	0	5	0	159	14
