= Balta (footballer) =

Spanish footballer and manager

Personal information
- Full name: Baltasar Sánchez Martín
- Date of birth: 9 May 1962 (age 64)
- Place of birth: Santander, Spain
- Height: 1.77 m (5 ft 9 1/2 in)
- Position: Centre-back

Youth career
- Salamanca

Senior career*
Years	Team	Apps	(Gls)
?–1984	Salmantino		
1984–1995	Salamanca	274	(22)

Managerial career
- 1995–2000: Salamanca (assistant)
- 1997: Salamanca (interim)
- 1999: Salamanca (interim)
- 2000: Salamanca
- 2001–2002: Salamanca
- 2003–2005: Zamora
- 2006–2007: Logroñés
- 2011: Salamanca
- 2015–2016: Zamora
- * Club domestic league appearances and goals

Baltasar Sánchez Martín (born 9 May 1962), commonly known as Balta, is a Spanish former footballer who played as a central defender. He was also a manager.

== Playing career ==
Born in Santander, Cantabria, Balta was a UD Salamanca youth graduate. After being promoted to the first team in 1984, he represented them in both Segunda División and Segunda División B over 11 seasons, playing 318 matches in all competitions and scoring 26 goals.

Balta was part of the squad that competed in La Liga in 1983–84, but failed to appear in any games. He retired in 1995 at the age of 33, after helping the Juan Manuel Lillo-led side to promotion to the top flight.

== Coaching career ==
Shortly after his retirement, Balta started working as an assistant manager at his only club, acting as an occasional interim coach. In March 2001 he was appointed at the main squad, but was dismissed in October of the following year.

In November 2003, Balta was named Zamora CF manager, and led the side to the play-offs final in 2005, losing to CD Castellón on the away goals rule. He was relieved of his duties in November 2005, and was appointed at the helm of Logroñés CF in the summer of 2006.

Balta was fired on 19 November 2007, after failing to win a single match in the campaign. He returned to Salamanca in August 2009, now as director of football.

On 12 April 2011, Balta was appointed manager of the Charros after replacing José Murcia. He eventually suffered relegation from the second division and left his post on 14 November, returning to his previous staff role.

Balta returned to Zamora on 30 April 2015, tasked with saving the team from relegation in the last three games of the third-tier campaign. They descended to Tercera División, and won their group the next season, but he was sacked on 5 June 2016 after a 3–1 loss to UD Mutilvera in the first leg of the second round of the play-offs.

== See also ==
- List of one-club men
