= Tomás Nistal =

Tomás Nistal may refer to:

- Tomás Nistal (cyclist) (born 1948), Spanish cyclist
- Tomás Nistal (footballer) (born 1960), Spanish footballer
