= Logroñés CF =

Spanish football club

Logroñés
- Full name: Logroñés Club de Fútbol
- Founded: 2000
- Dissolved: 2008
- Ground: Las Gaunas, Logroño, La Rioja, Spain
- Capacity: 16,000
- Chairman: (Spain) Eduardo Blanco
- Manager: (Spain) Balta Sánchez
- League: —
- 2007–08: 2ªB - Group 2, 17th
Home colours	Away colours

Logroñés Club de Fútbol was a Spanish football team based in Logroño, in the autonomous community of La Rioja. Founded in 2000 and dissolved in 2008 it held home games at Estadio Las Gaunas, with a capacity of 16,000 spectators.

== History ==
Logroñés Club de Fútbol was founded in 2000 as Club Deportivo Recreación de La Rioja, but in 2005 changed its name. In 2008–09, after five consecutive seasons in the third division, it was not registered in any official competition.

=== Club names ===
- CD Recreación - (2000–05)
- Logroñés CF - (2005–08)

== Season to season ==
Season	Tier	Division	Place	Copa del Rey
2000–01	5	Reg. Pref.	1st	
2001–02	4	3ª	3rd	
2002–03	4	3ª	3rd	
2003–04	3	2ª B	5th	
2004–05	3	2ª B	6th	
2005–06	3	2ª B	15th	
2006–07	3	2ª B	10th	
2007–08	3	2ª B	17th	

Logo until 2004–05

- 5 seasons in Segunda División B
- 2 seasons in Tercera División
