= César Álvarez =

Spanish footballer (born 2003)

Personal information
- Full name: César Álvarez Abrante
- Date of birth: 15 April 2003 (age 23)
- Place of birth: Santa Cruz de Tenerife, Spain
- Height: 1.73 m (5 ft 8 in)
- Position: Right-back

Team information
- Current team: Tenerife
- Number: 19

Youth career
- Juventud Laguna
- 2013–2022: Tenerife

Senior career*
Years	Team	Apps	(Gls)
2022–2025	Tenerife B	72	(2)
2025–	Tenerife	44	(3)
- * Club domestic league appearances and goals as of 9 June 2026

César Álvarez Abrante (born 15 April 2003) is a Spanish professional footballer who plays as a right-back for CD Tenerife.

== Career ==
Born in Santa Cruz de Tenerife, Canary Islands, Álvarez joined CD Tenerife's youth sides from CF Juventud Laguna. He made his senior debut with the reserves on 11 September 2022, coming on as a second-half substitute for Cacho in a 3–2 Tercera Federación home win over CD Marino.

Álvarez scored his first senior goal on 8 April 2023, netting the B's second in a 4–3 away loss to CD Unión Sur Yaiza. He established himself as a starter for the B-side, contributing with one goal in 28 appearances during the 2023–24 season as they achieved promotion to Segunda Federación.

Álvarez made his first team debut with Tete on 29 January 2025, replacing injured Jérémy Mellot in a 0–0 Segunda División home draw against Deportivo de La Coruña. On 13 June, after suffering relegation, he renewed his contract until 2028 and was definitely promoted to the main squad.
