= David Amaral (footballer) =

Spanish footballer and manager

Personal information
- Full name: David Amaral Rodríguez
- Date of birth: 12 October 1958 (age 68)
- Place of birth: Arico, Spain
- Height: 1.76 m (5 ft 9 in)
- Position: Winger

Youth career
- Toscal

Senior career*
Years	Team	Apps	(Gls)
1977–1980	Toscal		
1980–1990	Tenerife	254	(43)
1985–1986	→ Binéfar (loan)	29	(3)
Total		283+	(46+)

Managerial career
- Güímar (youth)
- Güímar
- San Andrés
- Arona
- 1995–1996: Realejos
- 1997–1998: Corralejo
- 1998–1999: Gáldar
- 1999–2000: Universidad LP
- 2001–2002: Lanzarote
- 2002–2003: Universidad LP
- 2003–2004: Tenerife
- 2004: Las Palmas
- 2006: Tenerife
- 2006–2007: Cartagena
- 2007–2008: Ponferradina
- 2008–2009: Salamanca
- 2009: Castellón
- 2011: Tenerife
- 2013–2014: Huesca
- 2019: Granadilla (women)
- * Club domestic league appearances and goals

David Amaral Rodríguez (born 12 October 1958) is a Spanish former footballer who played as a left winger. He also worked as a manager.

He spent all of his senior playing career contracted to Tenerife, a club who he coached in three brief spells in the Segunda División. He also led Universidad de Las Palmas, Salamanca and Castellón at that level.

== Playing career ==
Amaral was born in Arico, on Tenerife in the Canary Islands. He spent his entire professional career with local CD Tenerife, apart from the 1985–86 season on loan to CD Binéfar in the Segunda División B – who were relegated.

Over four seasons, Amaral amassed Segunda División totals of 113 matches and 13 goals. He scored his first in the competition on 2 October 1983 in a 2–2 home draw against RC Celta de Vigo, after a blunder from the opposition's goalkeeper.

Amaral scored seven times in the 1988–89 campaign as team captain, and Tenerife returned to La Liga for the first time since 1961 after besting Real Betis 4–1 on aggregate in the promotion/relegation playoffs. He never made an appearance in the top flight, however, being forced to retire aged 31 due to a serious injury.

== Coaching career ==
After managing several other clubs in the archipelago, Amaral was hired at Tenerife in January 2003, and resigned a year later with the team one point off the second-tier relegation zone. After a few months with rivals UD Las Palmas in the third division, he returned to the second with Tenerife briefly in 2006.

Amaral took his first job outside his native islands in July 2006, with FC Cartagena. He left his position the following January, in protest at roles such as transfer business being assigned to Paco Gómez instead.

In 2007–08, Amaral's SD Ponferradina won their group in division three, but lost the play-off final 2–1 on aggregate to Alicante CF. He missed the first leg of that tie, having been sent off in the semi-final against Mérida UD. In July 2008, he returned to the second tier with UD Salamanca, whom he led to ninth place in his only campaign.

Amaral was appointed by CD Castellón in the same league in June 2009. He was sacked on 13 October with the team in last place, having earned one point from seven games and lost the six others consecutively.

In April 2011, Amaral returned to a Tenerife side seven points into the relegation zone with ten matches left in the second division. Despite having a year left on his contract, he was dismissed in June following their descent.

Amaral returned to football in late September 2013, taking over an SD Huesca side in the zone of relegation to the Tercera División. The following March, he was shown the door.

In May 2019, Amaral ended a five-year hiatus by taking the place of Pier Luigi Cherubino at women's football team UD Granadilla Tenerife.
