= Unión Deportiva Tenerife =

Defunct Spanish football club from Tenerife (1950–1953)

U.D. Tenerife
- Full name: Unión Deportiva Tenerife
- Nicknames: Santacruzeros, Capitalinos, la Unión Deportiva
- Founded: November 18, 1950
- Dissolved: c. March 1953
- Stadium: Campo de La Manzanilla La Laguna, Spain Founded on 1923
- League: Primera Categoría de Tenerife
- 1952–53: 2nd
| Home colours | Away colours |

The Unión Deportiva Tenerife, also popularly known as "la Unión Deportiva" or by its acronym "UDT", was a Spanish football club based in the city of Santa Cruz de Tenerife, on the island of Tenerife. The Iberia Fútbol Club team was founded on November 18, 1950, following the merger of Club Deportivo Iberia and Price, with support from Club Deportivo Tenerife, Club Deportivo Norte, Real Hespérides, and Real Unión de Tenerife through financial aid and player loans. The primary goal of the club was promotion to the Segunda División, emulating the success of UD Las Palmas, by uniting the island's most notable teams and players. At the time, it was challenging for a team from the Canary Islands to reach national competitions, (Note: Mainly due to the different structure of insular football and the logistical and financial barriers posed by travel to the archipelago. These were among the reasons why Canary Islands teams were initially excluded from national championships after the restructuring of various regional championships.) but this success inspired Tenerife to adopt the same approach to have its own national representative.

Its most notable campaign was in 1950–51, when, as Tenerife's regional champion, it came close to achieving promotion to the Segunda División but failed after losing the promotion play-off against Levante Unión Deportiva with a 3–2 aggregate score. After finishing last in the 1951–52 season, the club ceased operations in 1953 when Club Deportivo Tenerife achieved promotion, leading to a withdrawal of support in favor of the latter, which fulfilled the original goal of giving Tenerife a team in national competitions.

It played its final season at the Campo de La Manzanilla, inaugurated in 1923 and known since 1969 as Estadio Municipal Francisco Peraza. The club's identifying colors were blue and white, featured in its home kit, while red was used for the away kit.

== History ==
=== Background and foundation ===
Following various restructurings of the regional championships due to the growing number of clubs and the ongoing development of football in Spain, national competitions emerged at the expense of local ones. This led to the disappearance of most regional tournaments, except in the Canary Islands, where, due to mainland teams' reluctance to travel to the islands because of the long distance and high costs, local clubs were excluded and continued to compete in their own competition (Primera Categoría) divided by islands. It was not until June 1949 that the Royal Spanish Football Federation approved the inclusion of these clubs in national categories after an assembly on June 4, which recognized the Regional Championship as equivalent to the Tercera División. At the end of the 1949–50 season, the regional champions of Tenerife and Gran Canaria, Club Deportivo Tenerife and Unión Deportiva Las Palmas, competed for the single available Segunda División spot, which went to the Gran Canaria team.

The federation announced that at the end of the next season, the Tenerife regional champion would have another opportunity for promotion in a play-off against the 13th-placed team in Segunda División. This prompted a merger agreement in October 1950 between Iberia Fútbol Club and Club Deportivo Price to create the Unión Deportiva Tenerife, aiming to replicate Gran Canaria's successful model. To ensure Tenerife had a strong representative in national competitions, unifying efforts was necessary, gaining support through relevant meetings. The club was officially established on November 18, integrating all Tenerife clubs from the Primera Categoría. Club Deportivo Tenerife, Club Deportivo Norte, Real Hespérides, and Real Unión de Tenerife agreed to pursue a common goal, supporting the new team, which drew its best players from these clubs.

=== 1950–51 season ===
On November 26, a tournament organized by the Tenerife Football Federation at the request of Unión Deportiva Tenerife was held at the Estadio Heliodoro Rodríguez López to identify the best players for its squad. Named the Torneo Relámpago for being held in a single day, it was won by Real Unión de Tenerife, which received a cup donated by the president of the Canary Islands Football Federation, Juan de la Rosa. Initially, there was consideration to skip the Tenerife Primera Categoría championship that season, but it was ultimately held. Unión won the tournament with one match remaining, three points ahead of Real Hespérides. This success further galvanized fan support for the promotion goal. The opponent in the promotion play-off was Levante Unión Deportiva.

The first leg was played on May 13, 1951, at Estadio Heliodoro Rodríguez López. Unión Deportiva won 1–0 with a goal by Lorencito in the 8th minute, though he missed a penalty in the second half that proved decisive. The Heliodoro recorded the highest attendance in Tenerife football history at the time. The return leg was held on May 27 at Estadio de Vallejo in Valencia. Levante overturned the tie with a 3–1 win, with goals from Joaquín Amat, Francisco Lahuera, and Carlos Moreno for the Valencians, and a goal by Pedrín in the 49th minute for Tenerife. Unión Deportiva Tenerife lost the tie 3–2 on aggregate and failed to gain promotion.

May 13, 1951

| U. D. Tenerife | 1–0 | Levante U. D. |
|---|---|---|
| Lorencito 8' | Report |

Heliodoro Rodríguez López, Santa Cruz de Tenerife
Referee: José Guerra Prieto
May 27, 1951

| Levante U. D. | 3–1 | U. D. Tenerife |
|---|---|---|
| Joaquín Amat 11'; Francisco Lahuera 71'; Carlos Moreno 79' | Report | Pedrín 49' |

Estadio de Vallejo, Valencia
Referee: Antonio Balcells Regué

=== 1951–52 season ===
The disappointment of failing to achieve promotion caused discouragement among fans and the club, weakening the project, reflected in Club Deportivo Tenerife's decision to compete independently again. Other clubs continued support despite no promotion opportunity the following season due to the lack of an available spot. The tournament, lacking the appeal of previous ones, was won by Club Deportivo Tenerife, followed by Club Deportivo Norte and Real Unión, third. Unión Deportiva, with squad changes, finished fifth and last with three points. Despite the announcement of a new promotion spot, collaboration agreements weakened, rendering the goal utopian.

=== 1952–53 season ===
The 1952–53 Tenerife champion was to compete in a two-leg play-off against the 12th-placed team in Segunda División Group II, offering another chance for clubs to represent the province of Santa Cruz de Tenerife nationally. However, the Spanish Federation's requirement for a grass pitch to compete nationally, which the club lacked, complicated matters. Unable to afford national competition costs, Real Hespérides transferred its valid pitch—La Manzanilla—to Unión.

Due to the withdrawal of teams, the insular federation organized a tournament to determine promotion instead of the traditional championship. The Promotion Tournament was contested by three clubs after the exclusion of Hespérides and Real Unión. Club Deportivo Tenerife defeated the other two contenders and later Orihuela Deportiva in the promotion play-off, becoming the first Tenerife club to compete nationally. Following Club Deportivo Tenerife's promotion, Unión Deportiva dissolved, as its founding objective was achieved, albeit by another club.

== Symbolism ==
Coat of arms of Tenerife

=== Coat of arms ===
The Unión Deportiva Tenerife crest is shaped like an "olla," divided into three quarters. The lower part features Mount Teide with snow on its peak, surrounded by a blue sky with six stars. The upper part consists of pales in white and blue, the club's identifying colors. Between them is the coat of arms of Tenerife without the infant's coronet, palms, or red bordure. A central stripe displays the club's name, U.D. Tenerife. The crest is topped with a royal crown.

=== Kit ===
- Home: The home kit consisted of a blue shirt with white sleeves, white shorts, and white socks.
- Away: The away kit comprised a red shirt, red shorts, and red socks.

| Local team | Away team |

== Stadium ==
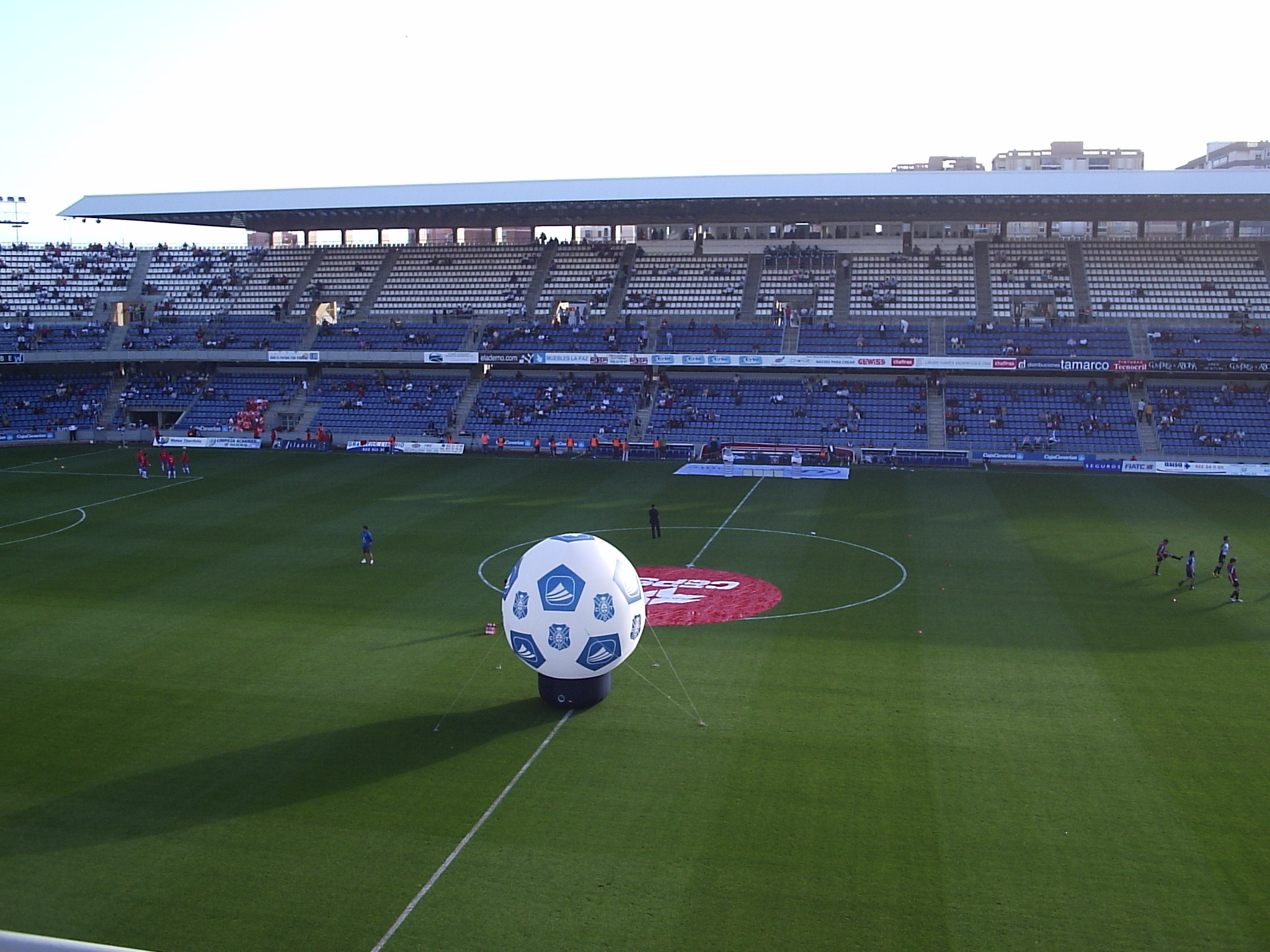
Current state of the Heliodoro.

Unión Deportiva Tenerife played its final season at the Campo de La Manzanilla, known since 1969 as Estadio Municipal Francisco Peraza. It was loaned by Real Hespérides Club de Fútbol in 1952, as teams without their own pitch were ineligible for national competitions. Aware of its inability to cover national competition costs, Hespérides transferred the pitch's ownership to Unión Deportiva. The stadium, inaugurated in 1923, is located in La Vega Lagunera, in San Cristóbal de La Laguna.

Previously, it played at the Estadio Heliodoro Rodríguez López, located at Calle La Mutine s/n, in Santa Cruz de Tenerife. Owned by Club Deportivo Tenerife, it was made available to Unión Deportiva for its matches. In its early years, it had a capacity of 7,000 spectators.

== Club details ==
=== Season record ===
Primera Categoría de Tenerife

1950–51 Season
| P. | Team | Pts | PJ | PG | PE | PP | GF | GC |
|---|---|---|---|---|---|---|---|---|
| 1st | U.D. Tenerife | 14 | 8 | 6 | 2 | 0 | 25 | 7 |
| 2nd | C.D. Tenerife | 8 | 8 | 3 | 2 | 3 | 13 | 10 |
| 3rd | R. Hespérides | 8 | 8 | 3 | 2 | 3 | 11 | 15 |
| 4th | C.D. Norte | 6 | 8 | 3 | 0 | 5 | 12 | 18 |
| 5th | R.U. Tenerife | 4 | 8 | 1 | 2 | 5 | 8 | 19 |

1951–52 Season
| P. | Team | Pts | PJ | PG | PE | PP | GF | GC |
|---|---|---|---|---|---|---|---|---|
| 1st | C.D. Tenerife | 12 | 8 | 6 | 0 | 2 | 22 | 8 |
| 2nd | C.D. Norte | 12 | 8 | 6 | 0 | 2 | 19 | 12 |
| 3rd | R.U. Tenerife | 7 | 8 | 3 | 1 | 4 | 12 | 18 |
| 4th | R. Hespérides | 6 | 8 | 2 | 2 | 4 | 12 | 17 |
| 5th | U.D. Tenerife | 3 | 8 | 1 | 1 | 6 | 13 | 23 |

1952–53 Season
| P. | Team | Pts | PJ | PG | PE | PP | GF | GC |
|---|---|---|---|---|---|---|---|---|
| 1st | C.D. Tenerife | 8 | 4 | 4 | 0 | 0 | 12 | 1 |
| 2nd | U.D. Tenerife | 2 | 4 | 1 | 0 | 3 | 6 | 9 |
| 3rd | C.D. Norte | 2 | 4 | 1 | 0 | 3 | 5 | 13 |

=== Honours ===
- Primera Categoría de Tenerife (1): 1950–51.

== Members ==
=== Players ===
For the club's foundation, several Tenerife teams loaned their most notable players to create a team representing the island. Club Deportivo Tenerife provided six players, Real Unión de Tenerife and Club Deportivo Norte five each, Real Hespérides three, and Club Deportivo Iberia and Price two each. Tenerife's players were Gorrín, Llanos, Santiago Villar, Arbelo, Cabrera, and Rojas.

Mario, a Unión Deportiva player, was the top scorer in the 1950–51 Primera Categoría de Tenerife with eight goals. In that season, Unión fielded 20 players, with Chicho, Mario, and Pedrín playing the most matches, eight each. Cabrera, Llanos, and Villar played seven matches.

=== Managers ===
According to the sports data website BDFutbol, Spaniard Juan Herrera managed the team during the promotion play-off and the 1950–51 season. In an interview with Aire Libre ahead of the promotion draw, Juan stated: "We'd like to play the first match at home. Here, we could field the full team with high morale. If we play away first, we might have injuries or an adverse result, which could lower the team's and fans' morale."

== Presidents ==
Unión Deportiva Tenerife had two presidents. The first was Fernando Aronzena, elected on July 31, 1951, after a provisional board. The second was Vicente Álvarez Cruz, who succeeded him following elections on June 28, 1952. Vicente was presented as a candidate by Aronzena in an interview on June 16, 1952.

== Supporters ==
From its founding, the team had the "Peña Rambla" supporters' group. Based in the Rambla de Santa Cruz, it had the merendero "Casa Ramallo" as its headquarters. They provided financial support and cheered the team with banners, firecrackers, flags, and rockets during home matches. The group's initials, R.A.M.B.L.A., stood for "rápido ascenso manteniendo bien las aspiraciones" (rapid promotion while maintaining high aspirations). There was also a supporters' group in Venezuela organized by Tenerife expatriates, providing financial support.

== See also ==
- List of football clubs in the Canary Islands
- List of football clubs in the province of Santa Cruz de Tenerife

== Bibliography ==
- Enrique Armando Perera García (2016). Real Unión de Tenerife, un siglo de vida a través de la prensa. Santa Cruz de Tenerife City Council. p. 280. ISBN 978-84-60864-37-0.
