= Tomás Nistal (footballer) =

Spanish footballer and manager

Personal information
- Full name: Tomás Nistal García
- Date of birth: 14 May 1960 (age 66)
- Place of birth: Cubillos del Sil, Spain
- Position: Winger

Youth career
- Ponferradina

Senior career*
| Years | Team | Apps | (Gls) |
| 1977–1979 | Ponferradina | 39 | (3) |
| 1980–1983 | Portuense | 79 | (11) |
| 1983–1984 | Poli Almería | 19 | (6) |
| 1984–1988 | Ponferradina | 119 | (29) |
| Total | | 256 | (49) |

Managerial career
- 2011: Ponferradina
- 2016: Ponferradina (interim)
- * Club domestic league appearances and goals

Tomás Nistal García (born 14 May 1960) is a Spanish retired footballer who played as a winger, and current Manager for SD Ponferradina.

== Playing career ==
Born in Cubillos del Sil, El Bierzo, Castile and León, Nistal finished his formation with SD Ponferradina. He made his senior debuts in the 1977–78 campaign.

Nistal subsequently represented Racing Club Portuense and CP Almería before returning to Ponfe in 1984. He retired with the latter in 1988, aged 28, due to a serious injury.

== Post-playing career ==
In season 2005-06, with Nistal as Assistant Coach SD Ponferradina got the promotion to Second Division and the team joined the Professional Football League (LFP).

In 2005 Nistal was appointed Manager at his first club Ponferradina, position that he has kept until today. He has been acting as a coach in some periods. In January 2011 he was named Coach of the club, replacing fired José Carlos Granero.

Nistal remained in charge for the following two matches, Getting a 3-3 away draw against Córdoba and a 1–1 home draw against CD Tenerife. He was relieved from his duties after the arrival of Claudio Barragán, and was appointed director of football in June.
