= Juanjo Sánchez =

Spanish footballer

Personal information
- Full name: Juan José Sánchez Romero
- Date of birth: 22 March 2000 (age 26)
- Place of birth: Lebrija, Spain
- Height: 1.74 m (5 ft 9 in)
- Position: Midfielder

Team information
- Current team: Tenerife
- Number: 6

Youth career
- 2013–2016: Betis
- 2016–2017: Antoniano
- 2017–2018: Balón de Cádiz
- 2018–2019: Antoniano

Senior career*
Years	Team	Apps	(Gls)
2018–2019	Antoniano B	7	(2)
2018–2020	Antoniano	46	(4)
2020–2024	Rayo Majadahonda	48	(1)
2022–2023	→ Betis B (loan)	28	(1)
2024–2025	Mérida	41	(2)
2025–	Tenerife	38	(1)
- * Club domestic league appearances and goals as of 16 August 2026

Juan José "Juanjo" Sánchez Romero (born 22 March 2000), sometimes known as just Juanjo, is a Spanish footballer who plays as a midfielder for CD Tenerife.

== Career ==
Born in Lebrija, Seville, Andalusia, Juanjo played for Real Betis, CA Antoniano and Cádiz CF (although only in affiliate side Balón de Cádiz CF) as a youth. After finishing his formation with Antoniano, he made his first team debut in 2018 and went on to establish himself as a starter for the club afterwards.

On 21 June 2020, Juanjo moved to Segunda División B side CF Rayo Majadahonda. Mainly a backup option, he renewed his contract until 2026 on 20 July 2022, but immediately returned to Betis on loan, being assigned to the reserves in Segunda Federación.

Back to the Majariegos in July 2023, Juanjo was again a backup option before moving to fellow Primera Federación side Mérida AD on 31 January of the following year. On 23 May 2024, he renewed his contract for a further year.

On 24 June 2025, Juanjo agreed to a three-year deal with CD Tenerife, freshly relegated to division three. He was an undisputed starter for the side during the campaign, scoring once in 39 matches overall as they returned to Segunda División at first attempt.

Sánchez made his professional debut on 16 August 2026, starting in a 3–1 away win over SD Eibar.
