= Cubillos del Sil =

- village and municipality
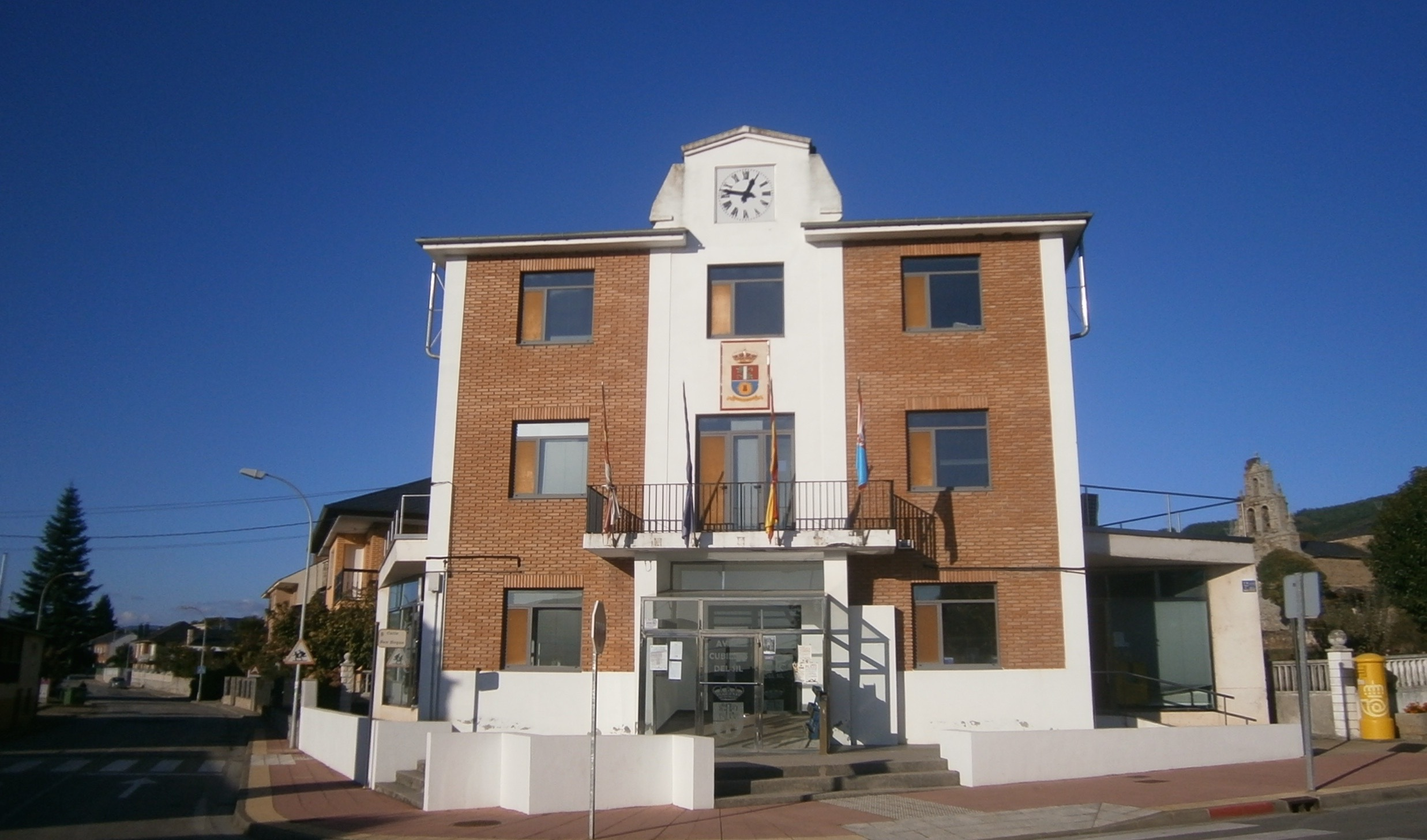
- Town hall

- Coat of arms

- Location within Spain
- Coordinates: 42°37′25″N 6°33′49″W
- Country: Spain
- Autonomous community: Castile and León
- Province: León
- Comarca: El Bierzo
- Municipality: Cubillos del Sil

Government
  - Mayor: José Luis Ramón Corral (PSOE)

Area
  - Total: 53.41 km^{2} (20.62 sq mi)
- Elevation: 577 m (1,893 ft)

Population (2025-01-01)
  - Total: 1,746
  - Density: 32.69/km^{2} (84.67/sq mi)
- Demonym: cubillense
- Time zone: UTC+1 (CET)
  - Summer (DST): UTC+2 (CEST)
- Postal Code: 24492
- Telephone prefix: 987
- Climate: Csb
- Website: Ayto. de Cubillos del Sil

Cubillos del Sil (Spanish pronunciation: [kuˈβiʎos ðel sil]) is a village and municipality located in the region of El Bierzo (the province of León, Castile and León, Spain). It is located near Ponferrada, the capital of El Bierzo. Cubillos del Sil has about 1,771 inhabitants.

Its economy was traditionally based on agriculture, wine and coal mining. Nowadays, most of the inhabitants work in the surrounding area on activities such as electricity generation manufacturing in Endesa (Compostilla II Power Station).

Cubillos del Sil also has a large reservoir in its vicinity, the Barcena reservoir, which many tourists visit during the summer.
