= Teide Trophy =

Teide Trophy Trofeo Teide
- Founded: 1971
- Teams: 2-3-4
- Current champions: CD Tenerife
- Most championships: CD Tenerife (24)
- Broadcaster: TV Canaria

The Teide Trophy (Spanish: Trofeo Teide) is a pre-season football tournament organised in Tenerife (Canary Islands. The matches are played at Estadio de Los Cuartos, a historic stadium located in La Orotava, a city in the north of the island.

It has been played annually in August since 1971, and is one of the most prestigious summer tournaments in Spain.

== Titles by year ==
Edition	Year	Winner	Runners-Up	Result
I	1971	(Spain) RCD La Coruña	(Spain) CD Puerto Cruz	2-0
II	1972	(Spain) Real Unión de Tenerife	(Spain) CD Puerto Cruz	2-0
III	1973	(Spain) CD Tenerife	(Spain) Real Zaragoza	4-2
IV	1974	(Spain) CD Tenerife	Hungary FC Tatabánya	4-2
V	1975	Hungary MTK Budapest FC	(Spain) CD Tenerife	Triangular
VI	1976	(Spain) CD Tenerife	(Spain) Hércules CF	2-0
VII	1977	(Spain) CD Puerto Cruz	(Spain) UD Realejos	2-0
VIII	1978	(Spain) CD San Andrés	(Spain) Toscal CF	2-1
IX	1979	(Spain) UD Las Palmas Atl.	(Spain) Real Madrid Castilla	3-1
X	1980	(Spain) UD Las Palmas Atl.	(Spain) CE Europa	1-0
XI	1981	(Spain) CD Tenerife	(Spain) Bilbao Athletic	2-1
XII	1982	(Spain) CD Tenerife	(Spain) UD Salamanca	0-0 (pen.)
XIII	1983	(Spain) Real Valladolid	(Spain) CD Tenerife	3-1
XIV	1984	(Spain) CD Tenerife	(Spain) Sevilla FC	1-1 (pen.)
XV	1985	(Spain) Valencia CF	(Spain) CD Tenerife	2-2 (pen.)
XVI	1986	(Spain) CD Tenerife	Portugal CF Os Belenenses	2-1
VXII	1987	(Spain) UD Las Palmas	(Spain) CD Tenerife	2-1
XVIII	1988	(Spain) Club Deportivo Marino	(Spain) CD Tenerife	2-1
XIX	1989	(Spain) CD Tenerife	Uruguay Danubio FC	3-1
XX	1990	Uruguay Club Atlético Peñarol	(Spain) CD Tenerife	2-1
XXI	1991	(Spain) CD Tenerife	(Spain) Real Betis Balompié	3-0
XXII	1992	(Spain) CD Tenerife	Chile CD Univ. Católica	3-2
XXII	1993	Chile CD Univ. Católica	(Spain) CD Tenerife	4-1
XXIV	1994	(Spain) CD Tenerife	Mexico CD Veracruz	6-0
XXV	1995	(Spain) CD Tenerife	(Spain) UD Salamanca	2-0
XXVI	1996	(Spain) CD Tenerife	Portugal SC Farense	2-0
XXVII	1997	(Spain) CD Tenerife	Brazil Botafogo FR	4-0
XXVIII	1998	(Spain) CD Tenerife	Portugal Vitória Setúbal	3-2
XXIX	1999	(Spain) CD Tenerife	Portugal SC Braga	0-0 (pen.)
XXX	2000	(Spain) Univ. de LPGC CF	(Spain) CD Tenerife	1-0
XXXI	2001	(Spain) Real Madrid Castilla	(Spain) CD Tenerife	2-1
XXXII	2002	(Spain) Real Madrid Castilla	(Spain) UD Las Palmas	2-0
XXXIV	2003	(Spain) CD Tenerife	(Spain) UD Las Palmas	Triangular
XXXV	2004	(Spain) CD Tenerife	(Spain) UD Las Palmas	1-0
XXXVI	2005	(Spain) Real Madrid Castilla	(Spain) CD Tenerife	2-0
XXXVII	2006	(Spain) UD Las Palmas	(Spain) UD Vecindario	0-0 (pen.)
XXXVIII	2007	(Spain) CD Tenerife	(Spain) Sevilla Atlético	2-2 (pen.)
XXXIX	2008	(Spain) CD Tenerife	(Spain) Athletic Club	3-1
XL	2009	(Spain) Real Sociedad	(Spain) CD Tenerife	1-0
XLI	2010	(Spain) CD Tenerife	(Spain) Real Zaragoza	1-0
XLII	2011	(Spain) Real Madrid Castilla	(Spain) CD Tenerife	0-0 (pen.)
XLII	2012	(Spain) Club Deportivo Marino	(Spain) CD Tenerife	2-1
XLIII	2013	(Spain) CD Tenerife	(Spain) Rayo Vallecano	5-0
XLIV	2014	(Spain) RCD Español	(Spain) CD Tenerife	1-0
XLV	2015	(Spain) CD Tenerife	(Spain) SD Eibar	1-1 (pen.)
XLVI	2016	(Spain) CD Tenerife	(Morocco) FUS Rabat	3-0
XLVII	2017	(Spain) CD Tenerife	(Spain) Deportivo La Coruña	-

== Titles by club ==
Team	Winners	Runners-Up	Years won
(Spain) CD Tenerife	24	14	1973, 1974, 1976, 1981, 1982, 1984, 1986, 1989, 1991, 1992, 1993, 1994, 1995, 1996, 1997, 1998, 1999, 2003, 2004, 2007, 2008, 2010, 2013, 2015.
(Spain) Real Madrid Castilla	4	1	2001, 2002, 2005, 2011
(Spain) UD Las Palmas	2	3	1987, 2006
(Spain) CD Marino	2	-	1988, 2012
(Spain) UD Las Palmas Atl.	2	-	1979, 1980
(Spain) CD Puerto Cruz	1	2	1977
(Chile) CD Universidad Católica	1	1	1993
(Uruguay) CA Peñarol	1	-	1990
(Spain) Valencia CF	1	-	1985
(Hungary) MTK Budapest FC	1	-	1975
(Spain) Deportivo de La Coruña	1	-	1971
(Spain) Real Valladolid	1	-	1983
(Spain) Real Unión de Tenerife	1	-	1972
(Spain) RCD Espanyol	1	-	2014
(Spain) Real Sociedad	1	-	2009
(Spain) Univ. de LPGC CF	1	-	1990
(Spain) CD San Andrés	1	-	1978

== Women's edition ==
Edition	Year	Winner	Runners-Up	Result
I	2015	(Spain) Tenerife	(Spain) Canary Islands	7-1
II	2018	(Spain) Tenerife B	(Spain) Tacuense	4-0
III	2019	(Spain) Tenerife	(Spain) Levante	0-0 (pen.)
IV	2022	(Spain) Barcelona	(Spain) Tenerife	1-1 (4-2 pen.)
V	2024	(Spain) Tenerife	(Spain) Real Madrid	TBD

== Women's titles by club ==
Team	Winners	Runners-Up	Years won
(Spain) UD Tenerife	2	1	2015, 2019.
(Spain) UD Tenerife B	1	0	2018
(Spain) FC Barcelona Femení	1	0	2022
