= CD Puerto Cruz =

Spanish football club

Puerto Cruz
- Full name: Club Deportivo Puerto Cruz
- Founded: 1957
- Ground: El Peñón, Puerto de la Cruz, Canary Islands, Spain
- Capacity: 4,000
- President: Alonso Borges
- Head coach: Toño Hernández
- League: Interinsular Preferente
- 2025–26: Interinsular Preferente, 12th of 20
Home colours	Away colours

Club Deportivo Puerto Cruz is a Spanish football team based in Puerto de la Cruz, Tenerife, in the Canary Islands. Founded in 1957, it plays in Interinsular Preferente, holding home matches at Estadio Municipal El Peñón, with a capacity of 4,000 people.

== Honours ==
- Teide Trophy

Winners (1): 1977
Runners-up (2): 1971, 1972

== Season to season ==
Season	Tier	Division	Place	Copa del Rey
1957–58	5	2ª Reg.	3rd	
1958–59	5	2ª Reg.	2nd	
1959–60	5	2ª Reg.	1st	
1960–61	4	1ª Reg.	3rd	
1961–62	4	1ª Reg.	4th	
1962–63	4	1ª Reg.	4th	
1963–64	4	1ª Reg.	1st	
1964–65	4	1ª Reg.	3rd	
1965–66	4	1ª Reg.	1st	
1966–67	4	1ª Reg.	1st	
1967–68	4	1ª Reg.	6th	
1968–69	4	1ª Reg.	1st	
1969–70	4	1ª Reg.	1st	
1970–71	4	1ª Reg.	1st	
1971–72	4	1ª Reg.	4th	
1972–73	4	1ª Reg.	4th	
1973–74	4	1ª Reg.	3rd	
1974–75	4	Reg. Pref.	2nd	
1975–76	4	Reg. Pref.	8th	
1976–77	4	Reg. Pref.	4th	

Season	Tier	Division	Place	Copa del Rey
1977–78	5	Reg. Pref.	4th	
1978–79	5	Reg. Pref.	2nd	
1979–80	5	Reg. Pref.	4th	
1980–81	4	3ª	8th	
1981–82	4	3ª	14th	
1982–83	4	3ª	2nd	
1983–84	4	3ª	5th	First round
1984–85	4	3ª	8th	First round
1985–86	4	3ª	10th	
1986–87	4	3ª	7th	
1987–88	4	3ª	7th	
1988–89	4	3ª	5th	
1989–90	4	3ª	3rd	
1990–91	4	3ª	18th	First round
1991–92	5	Int. Pref.	6th	
1992–93	5	Int. Pref.	12th	
1993–94	5	Int. Pref.	2nd	
1994–95	5	Int. Pref.	4th	
1995–96	5	Int. Pref.	2nd	
1996–97	4	3ª	11th	

Season	Tier	Division	Place	Copa del Rey
1997–98	4	3ª	18th	
1998–99	5	Int. Pref.	2nd	
1999–2000	4	3ª	18th	
2000–01	5	Int. Pref.	12th	
2001–02	5	Int. Pref.	13th	
2002–03	5	Int. Pref.	3rd	
2003–04	5	Int. Pref.	14th	
2004–05	5	Int. Pref.	12th	
2005–06	5	Int. Pref.	16th	
2006–07	5	Int. Pref.	17th	
2007–08	6	1ª Int.	1st	
2008–09	5	Int. Pref.	10th	
2009–10	5	Int. Pref.	9th	
2010–11	5	Int. Pref.	16th	
2011–12	6	1ª Int.	3rd	
2012–13	6	1ª Int.	1st	
2013–14	5	Int. Pref.	15th	
2014–15	6	1ª Int.	8th	
2015–16	6	1ª Int.	1st	
2016–17	5	Int. Pref.	11th	

Season	Tier	Division	Place	Copa del Rey
2017–18	5	Int. Pref.	6th	
2018–19	5	Int. Pref.	8th	
2019–20	5	Int. Pref.	13th	
2020–21	5	Int. Pref.	9th	
2021–22	6	Int. Pref.	4th	
2022–23	6	Int. Pref.	6th	
2023–24	6	Int. Pref.	7th	
2024–25	6	Int. Pref.	10th	
2025–26	6	Int. Pref.		

- 14 seasons in Tercera División
