= CD San Andrés (Tenerife) =

Spanish football team

San Andrés
- Full name: Club Deportivo San Andrés
- Founded: 1930
- Ground: Las Huertas, San Andrés, Canary Islands, Spain
- Capacity: 600
- President: Domingo Brito
- Manager: Giovanni Miranda
- League: Interinsular Preferente
- 2025–26: Interinsular Preferente, 16th of 20
Home colours	Away colours

Club Deportivo San Andrés is a Spanish football team based in San Andrés, in the autonomous community of the Canary Islands. Founded in 1930, they play in Interinsular Preferente, holding home games at Campo del Valle Las Huertas, with a capacity of 600 people.

== Honours ==
- Teide Trophy

Winners (1): 1978

== Season to season ==
Season	Tier	Division	Place	Copa del Rey
1930–1943	—	Regional	—	
1943–44	5	2ª Reg.	2nd	
1944–45	5	2ª Reg.		
1945–46	5	2ª Reg.	4th	
1946–47	5	2ª Reg.	2nd	
1947–48	5	2ª Reg.	3rd	
1948–49	5	2ª Reg.	1st	
1949–50	DNP			
1950–51	5	2ª Reg.	1st	
1951–52	5	2ª Reg.	1st	
1952–53	5	2ª Reg.	1st	
1953–54	4	1ª Reg.	4th	
1954–55	4	1ª Reg.	4th	
1955–56	4	1ª Reg.	2nd	
1956–57	4	1ª Reg.	3rd	
1957–58	4	1ª Reg.	3rd	
1958–59	4	1ª Reg.	3rd	
1959–60	4	1ª Reg.	2nd	
1960–61	4	1ª Reg.	7th	
1961–62	4	1ª Reg.	5th	

Season	Tier	Division	Place	Copa del Rey
1962–63	4	1ª Reg.	5th	
1963–64	4	1ª Reg.	5th	
1964–65	4	1ª Reg.	11th	
1965–66	4	1ª Reg.	8th	
1966–67	4	1ª Reg.	11th	
1967–68	4	1ª Reg.	9th	
1968–69	4	1ª Reg.	2nd	
1969–70	4	1ª Reg.	7th	
1970–71	4	1ª Reg.	9th	
1971–72	4	1ª Reg.	9th	
1972–73	4	1ª Reg.	10th	
1973–74	5	2ª Reg.	1st	
1974–75	4	Reg. Pref.	4th	
1975–76	4	Reg. Pref.	6th	
1976–77	4	Reg. Pref.	3rd	
1977–78	5	Reg. Pref.	1st	
1978–79	4	3ª	18th	
1979–80	4	3ª	15th	First round
1980–81	4	3ª	3rd	
1981–82	4	3ª	5th	Second round

Season	Tier	Division	Place	Copa del Rey
1982–83	4	3ª	3rd	Second round
1983–84	4	3ª	11th	Second round
1984–85	4	3ª	4th	
1985–86	4	3ª	5th	First round
1986–87	4	3ª	17th	First round
1987–88	4	3ª	12th	
1988–89	4	3ª	20th	
1989–90	5	Terr. Pref.	4th	
1990–91	5	Int. Pref.	12th	
1991–92	5	Int. Pref.	2nd	
1992–93	4	3ª	20th	
1993–94	5	Int. Pref.	1st	
1994–95	4	3ª	20th	
1995–96	5	Int. Pref.	13th	
1996–97	5	Int. Pref.	4th	
1997–98	5	Int. Pref.	8th	
1998–99	5	Int. Pref.	15th	
1999–2000	5	Int. Pref.	4th	
2000–01	5	Int. Pref.	8th	
2001–02	5	Int. Pref.	2nd	

Season	Tier	Division	Place	Copa del Rey
2002–03	5	Int. Pref.	7th	
2003–04	5	Int. Pref.	8th	
2004–05	5	Int. Pref.	9th	
2005–06	5	Int. Pref.	6th	
2006–07	5	Int. Pref.	20th	
2007–08	6	1ª Int.	2nd	
2008–09	5	Int. Pref.	4th	
2009–10	5	Int. Pref.	8th	
2010–11	5	Int. Pref.	6th	
2011–12	5	Int. Pref.	8th	
2012–13	5	Int. Pref.	2nd	
2013–14	5	Int. Pref.	7th	
2014–15	5	Int. Pref.	11th	
2015–16	5	Int. Pref.	12th	
2016–17	5	Int. Pref.	18th	
2017–18	6	1ª Int.	3rd	
2018–19	6	1ª Int.	10th	
2019–20	6	1ª Int.	6th	
2020–21	5	Int. Pref.	6th	
2021–22	6	Int. Pref.	9th	

Season	Tier	Division	Place	Copa del Rey
2022–23	6	Int. Pref.	17th	
2023–24	7	1ª Int.	6th	
2024–25	7	1ª Int.	1st	
2025–26	6	Int. Pref.	16th	
2026–27	6	Int. Pref.		

- 13 seasons in Tercera División
