= Noel López =

Spanish footballer (born 2003)

Personal information
- Full name: Noel López de la Fuente
- Date of birth: 17 March 2003 (age 23)
- Place of birth: Silleda, Spain
- Height: 1.82 m (6 ft 0 in)
- Position: Forward

Team information
- Current team: Tenerife
- Number: 11

Youth career
- 2012–2013: San Tirso
- 2013–2021: Deportivo La Coruña

Senior career*
Years	Team	Apps	(Gls)
2021–2022	Deportivo La Coruña	30	(4)
2022–2025	Real Madrid B	20	(1)
2024–2025	→ Osasuna B (loan)	16	(1)
2025–	Tenerife	35	(0)

International career^{‡}
2021–2022	Spain U19	6	(0)
- * Club domestic league appearances and goals as of 16 August 2026 ‡ National team caps and goals as of 22:00, 29 March 2022 (UTC)

Noel López de la Fuente (born 17 March 2003), sometimes known as Noel, is a Spanish footballer who plays as a forward for Primera Federación club Tenerife. He previously played at Real Madrid Castilla.

== Club career ==
Born in Silleda, a municipality of Pontevedra, López started playing football at the grassroots club San Tirso SD before joining Deportivo La Coruña in 2012. He came through each one of the club's youth ranks, as he was involved in the victory of the División de Honor Juvenil in 2021, and took part in Depor's consequent campaign in the UEFA Youth League.

At the start of the 2021-22 season, López was promoted to Deportivo La Coruña's first team, and subsequently made his professional debut on 29 August 2021, coming in for Miku Fedor at the 84th minute of the game against Celta Vigo B and scoring the final goal of a 5-0 win. In the occasion, the striker became Depor's first fully home-grown player to play and score in an official match with the senior squad. During the rest of the season, he featured regularly for the Galician side, scoring three other goals in the process, although the team eventually missed promotion to the Spanish second tier following a 2-1 defeat in the final against Albacete.

On 26 June 2022, Deportivo La Coruña officially announced that they had reached an agreement with Real Madrid for the transfer of López, starting from the 2022-23 season: the striker was then included in the squad of Real Madrid Castilla, the Blancos' reserve team. On 28 August 2024, after being rarely used, he was loaned to fellow Primera Federación side CA Osasuna B.

On 21 August 2025, López signed a two-year contract with CD Tenerife also in division three. Regularly used during the season, he appeared in 37 matches as the club achieved promotion to Segunda División.

López made his professional debut on 16 August 2026, starting in a 3–1 away win over SD Eibar.

== International career ==
López has represented Spain at youth international level, having played for the under-19 national team.

== Career statistics ==
=== Club ===
As of 18 May 2024

Club	Season	League			Cup		Other		Total	
Club	Season	Division	Apps	Goals	Apps	Goals	Apps	Goals	Apps	Goals
Deportivo La Coruña	2021–22	Primera División RFEF	30	4	2	0	—		32	4
Real Madrid Castilla	2022–23	Primera Federación	15	1	—		0	0	15	1
Real Madrid Castilla	2023–24	Primera Federación	5	0	—		—		5	0
Real Madrid Castilla	Total		20	1	0	0	0	0	20	1
Career total			50	5	2	0	0	0	52	5
