= Juan Carlos Mandiá =

Spanish footballer & manager (born 1967)

Personal information
- Full name: Juan Carlos Mandiá Lorenzo
- Date of birth: 17 January 1967 (age 59)
- Place of birth: Alfoz, Spain
- Height: 1.82 m (6 ft 0 in)
- Position: Defender

Youth career
- Real Madrid

Senior career*
Years	Team	Apps	(Gls)
1984–1988	Castilla	52	(0)
1988	Real Madrid	1	(0)
1988–1989	Español	21	(0)
1989–1993	Celta	92	(3)
1993–1995	Logroñés	38	(0)
1995–1997	Toledo	67	(0)
1997–2000	Córdoba	30	(0)
Total		302	(3)

International career
1985	Spain U18	1	(0)

Managerial career
- 2001–2002: Real Madrid (youth)
- 2002–2003: Logroñés
- 2003: Rayo Vallecano (assistant)
- 2004–2006: Hércules
- 2006–2007: Real Madrid B (assistant)
- 2007–2008: Real Madrid B
- 2008–2009: Hércules
- 2009: Racing Santander
- 2010–2011: Tenerife
- 2011–2012: Hércules
- 2013–2014: Alavés
- 2015: Sabadell
- 2015–2016: Marseille (assistant)
- 2017–2018: Málaga (assistant)
- 2019–2020: UNAM (assistant)
- 2021: Getafe (assistant)
- 2022–2023: Olympiacos (assistant)
- 2023–2025: Al Qadsiah (assistant)
- * Club domestic league appearances and goals

Juan Carlos Mandiá Lorenzo (born 17 January 1967) is a Spanish former professional footballer who played as a defender, currently a manager.

== Playing career ==
Mandiá was born in Alfoz, Province of Lugo. Over a 16-year playing career he represented Real Madrid Castilla (adding one first-team appearance), RCD Español, RC Celta de Vigo – helping to a 1992 promotion to La Liga– CD Logroñés, CD Toledo and Córdoba CF.

Mandiá totalled 88 top-flight matches over the course of six seasons, going scoreless in the process.

== Coaching career ==
Mandiá started a coaching career two years after retiring, achieving promotion from the Segunda División B with Hércules CF in 2005. In the 2006–07 season of Segunda División, he served as assistant to Míchel at Real Madrid Castilla, as they eventually dropped down a level.

Mandiá then took over as manager, falling just one point short of playoff contention in the 2007–08 campaign. Following a second spell at Hércules, he was named Racing de Santander's manager in late June 2009. After a poor start to the season, with only one point in the first five home matches, he was sacked by the Cantabrians on 9 November.

Mandiá returned to active in late September 2010, replacing fired Gonzalo Arconada at CD Tenerife (five games, five losses). On 23 January 2011, following a 1–1 home draw against UD Las Palmas, he too was dismissed.

In December 2013, Mandiá was appointed at second-division club Deportivo Alavés, but was relieved of his duties after only three months in charge. On 10 February 2015 he was hired at CE Sabadell FC for the rest of the season, and left on 10 June once the Catalans were relegated to the third tier.

Subsequently, Mandiá worked as assistant manager to Míchel at Ligue 1 side Olympique de Marseille, Málaga CF, Liga MX's Club Universidad Nacional, Getafe CF, Olympiacos F.C. of Super League Greece and Saudi Pro League team Al Qadsiah FC.

== Managerial statistics ==
As of match played 16 December 2018

Managerial record by team and tenure
Team	Nat	From	To	Record					Ref.
Team	Nat	From	To	G	W	D	L	Win %	Ref.
Logroñés	(Spain)	7 October 2002	4 June 2003	34	17	11	6	50.00	
Hércules	(Spain)	8 December 2004	13 February 2006	52	21	16	15	40.38	
Real Madrid Castilla	(Spain)	18 June 2007	11 June 2008	38	17	10	11	44.74	
Hércules	(Spain)	17 June 2008	26 June 2009	46	23	16	7	50.00	
Racing Santander	(Spain)	26 June 2009	29 November 2009	11	1	4	6	9.09	
Tenerife	(Spain)	26 September 2010	23 January 2011	15	3	7	5	20.00	
Hércules	(Spain)	22 June 2011	22 October 2012	56	25	10	21	44.64	
Alavés	(Spain)	3 December 2013	24 March 2014	15	5	2	8	33.33	
Sabadell	(Spain)	10 February 2015	8 June 2015	18	3	9	6	16.67	
Career Total				285	115	85	85	40.35	—

== Honours ==
=== Player ===
Real Madrid

- La Liga: 1987–88

Celta

- Segunda División: 1991–92
