= José Murcia =

Spanish football manager (born 1964)

Pepe Murcia
Personal information
- Full name: José Murcia González
- Date of birth: 3 December 1964 (age 61)
- Place of birth: Córdoba, Spain
- Position: Forward

Youth career
- 1977–1980: CD Alcázar
- 1980–1982: Zoco CF
- 1982–1984: Córdoba

Senior career*
Years	Team	Apps	(Gls)
1984–1986	Egabrense		
1986–1987	Jaén		
1987–1988	Córdoba		
1988	Valdepeñas	3	(0)
1988–1990	Córdoba	2	(0)
1990–1991	Plasencia		
1991	Martos		
1991–1992	Santaella		

Managerial career
- 1992–1994: Alcázar (youth)
- 1994–1996: Séneca (youth)
- 1996–2000: Córdoba (youth)
- 2000–2001: Córdoba B
- 2001–2002: Córdoba
- 2002: Cartagena
- 2003–2006: Atlético Madrid B
- 2006: Atlético Madrid
- 2006–2007: Xerez
- 2007–2008: Castellón
- 2008–2009: Celta
- 2009: Albacete
- 2011: Salamanca
- 2011: Braşov
- 2014: Levski Sofia
- 2016–2017: Legirus Inter
- 2017–2020: Al Shahaniya
- 2021: Sfaxien
- 2021–2023: Muaither
- 2023–2024: Al-Wakrah
- * Club domestic league appearances and goals

José 'Pepe' Murcia González (born 3 December 1964) is a Spanish former footballer who played as a forward, currently a manager.

== Career ==
Born in Córdoba, Andalusia, Murcia never played in higher than Segunda División B, and retired in 1992 at the age of only 27 due to injury. He coached several local youth teams in his early years, including Córdoba CF. After a successful spell with the reserves (two consecutive promotions all the way to Tercera División), he was one of four managers for the main squad in the 2001–02 season, achieving four wins, two draws and two losses during his eight games in charge as they eventually retained their Segunda División status.

Murcia then plied his trade in the third division, leading Atlético Madrid's B team to the league championship in his first year, albeit with no playoff promotion. On 9 January 2006, following a 0–0 La Liga home draw against Valencia CF, he was appointed the Colchoneros' first team's manager, replacing the dismissed Carlos Bianchi; they ranked 12th at that time, going on to finish the campaign in tenth position.

Murcia spent the following four years in the second tier with as many clubs, not managing to finish one single season but with none of the teams eventually losing their league status. On 30 November 2009, after a 2–3 home defeat to CD Numancia, he was fired at Albacete Balompié due to negative results, with the Castilla–La Mancha side in 16th position at that time– eventually ending 15th.

On 9 August 2011, Murcia signed a two-year contract with Romania's FC Brașov, but resigned at the Liga I club after three matches due to family reasons. In June 2014, after nearly three years out of football, he was appointed at PFC Levski Sofia in Bulgaria.

Murcia was sacked on 4 August 2014, due to poor results. In November 2016, whilst working out on his own, the FC Legirus Inter manager suffered a heart attack, slipping into a coma but eventually recovering.

In June 2017, Murcia was hired by Al Shahaniya SC, newly relegated to the Qatari Second Division. He won promotion to the Qatar Stars League with an unbeaten first season, and then came seventh in his second, earning him a nomination for Manager of the Year alongside Jesualdo Ferreira of champions Al Sadd SC.

== Managerial statistics ==
As of 20 November 2018

Managerial record by team and tenure
Team	Nat	From	To	Record							
Team	Nat	From	To	G	W	D	L	GF	GA	GD	Win %
Al Shahaniya	(Qatar)	22 June 2017	Present	70	30	13	27	103	90	+13	42.86

== Honours ==
=== Manager ===
Atlético Madrid B

- Segunda División B: 2003–04

Al Shahaniya

- Qatari Second Division: 2017–18
