= CD Tenerife =

Spanish association football club

Tenerife
- Full name: Club Deportivo Tenerife, S.A.D.
- Nicknames: Tete; Chicharreros; Tinerfeños; Blanquiazules
- Founded: 8 August 1922; 104 years ago
- Stadium: Estadio Heliodoro Rodríguez López
- Capacity: 22,824
- President: Felipe Miñambres
- Head coach: Álvaro Cervera
- League: Segunda División
- 2025–26: Primera Federación – Group 1, 1st of 20 (promoted)
- Website: clubdeportivotenerife.es
Home colours	Away colours	Third colours

Club Deportivo Tenerife, S.A.D. is a Spanish football club based in Santa Cruz de Tenerife, Tenerife, in the Canary Islands. Founded in 1922, the club plays in the Segunda División, holding home matches at the Estadio Heliodoro Rodríguez López, with a 22,824-seat capacity. The traditional home colours are white shirts and blue shorts.

Tenerife has a history playing in the top flight of La Liga. They have been promoted to the top tier on four occasions, including a 10-year stint from 1989 to 1999. The club managed to finish as high as fifth in the league table on two occasions during that period, which qualified them for the first round of the UEFA Cup. They most recently played in La Liga in the 2009–10 season.

Being based in the Canary archipelago off the Atlantic coast of Africa, while playing its away games on the Spanish mainland, both the club and rival Las Palmas from Gran Canaria are two of the most geographically isolated professional clubs. Tenerife and Las Palmas contest the Canary Islands derby.

== History ==
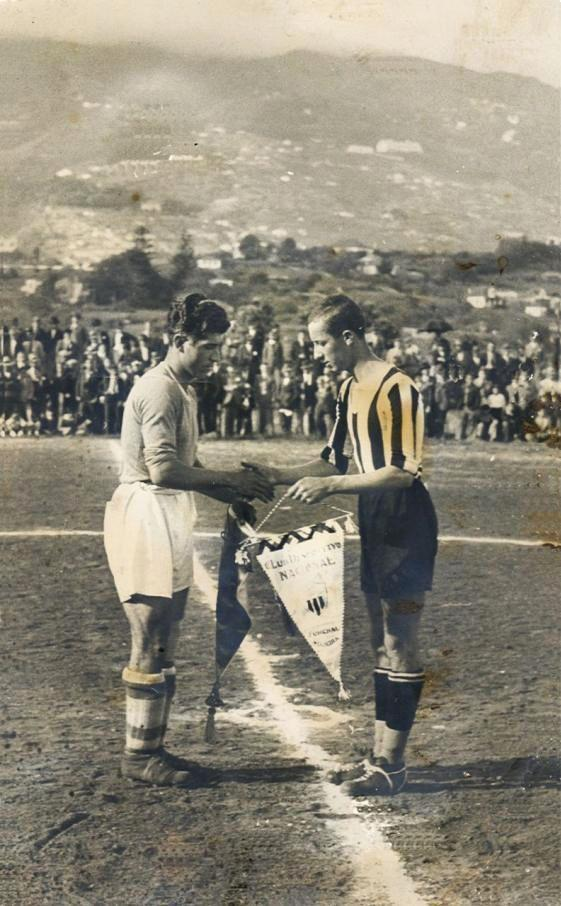
Match between CD Nacional of Madeira and CD Tenerife in 1925.

Club Deportivo Tenerife was founded in 1922. La Liga started in 1928, but the team played in regional divisions until it was promoted to the Segunda División in 1953. It first reached the top flight in 1961, being immediately relegated back and, in the following 27 years, played almost exclusively in the second level, also spending three years in Tercera División and six – five in a row – in Segunda División B, the newly created division three (in 1978).

In 1985 when Tenerife were relegated to the third division for a second time, Javier Pérez became president of the club. The side was promoted this year to the second level and, two years later, returned to the first, after winning the promotion playoff against Real Betis (4–1 on aggregate).

In 1991, Jorge Valdano took charge of the club as manager, and the Argentine would help deny former side Real Madrid of two consecutive league titles in the last round, to the benefit of Barcelona. In the first season, the Canary Islands outfit barely avoided relegation, but would finish in a best-ever fifth position in the following year, eventually reaching the round of 16 in the subsequent UEFA Cup, losing to Juventus 2–4 on aggregate.

German Jupp Heynckes became head coach of Tenerife in 1995, leading the club to another fifth-placed finish and the quarter-finals of the Copa del Rey. In the 1996–97 UEFA Cup, the islanders fared better, reaching the last-four after defeating Maccabi Tel Aviv, Lazio, Feyenoord and Brøndby (the winner coming late in extra time from an Antonio Mata free-kick), only bowing out to eventual winners Schalke 04.

Club Deportivo Tenerife league performance 1929–present.

Tenerife then went on a downward spiral which eventually led to relegation to the "silver category" in 1999, prompting various managerial changes within the club. In 2001, the club was again promoted, led by Rafael Benítez, who promptly left to take up the manager's job at Valencia; the promotion was achieved in the last match of the campaign thanks to a goal from Hugo Morales.

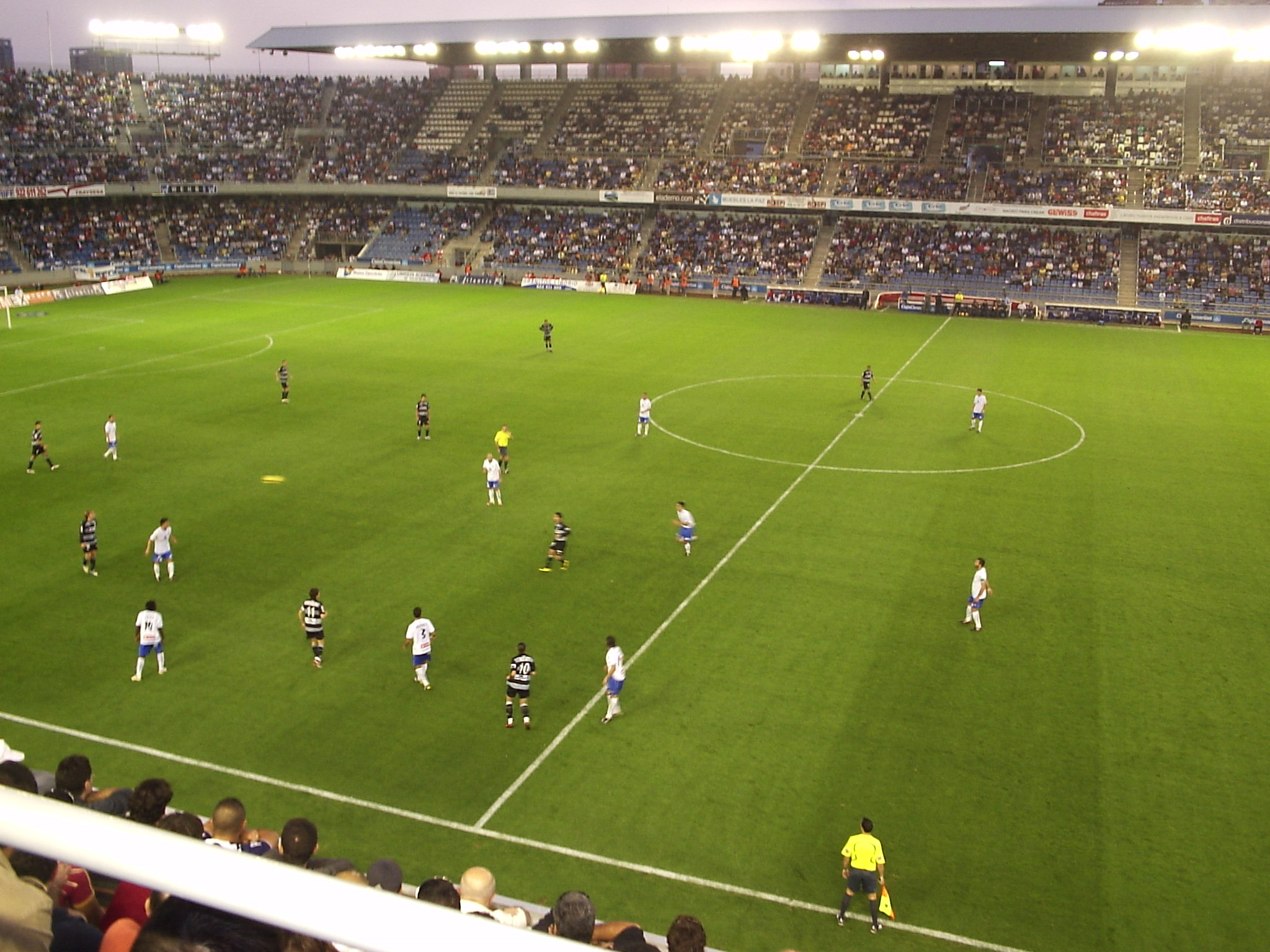
Match: Tenerife – Real Sociedad, in 2008

Pepe Mel became the new trainer but the first division season never took off, as Tenerife were beaten heavily at home by Barcelona 0–6, which cost the manager his job. Javier Clemente, formerly with the Spain national team, took the reins, but could not help prevent the eventual immediate relegation.

Tenerife suffered from serious economic problems in the following years, owing more than €40 million. President Pérez was replaced with Víctor Perez de Ascanio, who resigned due to bad management, leaving his position to Miguel Concepción, who negotiated with local politicians and businessmen, also creating a construction company as a subsidiary of the side.

On 13 June 2009, Tenerife secured a top flight return after a seven-year absence after a 1–0 win at Girona. In the following season, even though the team held on until the last round, another relegation befell, after the 0–1 loss at third-placed Valencia.

2010–11 brought with it three coaching changes, as Tenerife eventually suffered another relegation, returning to the third division after 24 years. On 2 June 2013, the club, led by Álvaro Cervera, returned to the second level after winning the promotion play-off against Hospitalet (3–2 on aggregate).

Tenerife almost achieved promotion to La Liga in 2016–17 and 2021–22 season, but was defeated by both Getafe and Girona at final play-off promotion in their respective season. Tenerife eventually suffered relegation to third division in 2024–25 season, following a 12-years stay in second division. On May 1st 2026, the club achieved promotion back to second division following a 2–0 victory against Barakaldo.

On 3 November 2026, Tenerife announced that their striker Jesús de Miguel died following a collision with FC Andorra goalkeeper Jesús Owono during a match on the previous day.

== Seasons ==
=== Season to season ===
Season	Tier	Division	Place	Copa del Rey
1928–29	4	1ª Reg.	2nd	
1929–30	4	1ª Reg.	2nd	
1930–31	4	1ª Reg.	2nd	
1931–32	4	1ª Reg.	1st	
1932–33	4	1ª Reg.	1st	
1933–34	4	1ª Reg.	1st	
1934–35	4	1ª Reg.	1st	
1935–36	4	1ª Reg.	2nd	
1940–41	4	1ª Reg.	1st	
1941–42	4	1ª Reg.	3rd	
1942–43	4	1ª Reg.	2nd	
1943–44	4	1ª Reg.	3rd	
1944–45	4	1ª Reg.	4th	
1945–46	4	1ª Reg.	1st	
1946–47	4	1ª Reg.	3rd	
1947–48	4	1ª Reg.	5th	
1948–49	4	1ª Reg.	4th	
1949–50	4	1ª Reg.	1st	
1950–51	4	1ª Reg.	2nd	
1951–52	4	1ª Reg.	1st	

Season	Tier	Division	Place	Copa del Rey
1952–53	4	1ª Reg.	1st	
1953–54	2	2ª	6th	
1954–55	2	2ª	9th	
1955–56	2	2ª	9th	
1956–57	2	2ª	13th	
1957–58	2	2ª	2nd	
1958–59	2	2ª	4th	Round of 32
1959–60	2	2ª	10th	First round
1960–61	2	2ª	1st	Quarter-finals
1961–62	1	1ª	16th	Quarter-finals
1962–63	2	2ª	10th	Round of 16
1963–64	2	2ª	5th	Round of 32
1964–65	2	2ª	11th	Round of 32
1965–66	2	2ª	8th	First round
1966–67	2	2ª	11th	Round of 32
1967–68	2	2ª	9th	First round
1968–69	3	3ª	5th	
1969–70	3	3ª	2nd	First round
1970–71	3	3ª	1st	Round of 32
1971–72	2	2ª	9th	Fourth round

Season	Tier	Division	Place	Copa del Rey
1972–73	2	2ª	14th	Fourth round
1973–74	2	2ª	4th	Round of 32
1974–75	2	2ª	12th	Fourth round
1975–76	2	2ª	7th	Quarter-finals
1976–77	2	2ª	6th	First round
1977–78	2	2ª	19th	Round of 16
1978–79	3	2ª B	6th	Second round
1979–80	3	2ª B	3rd	Second round
1980–81	3	2ª B	5th	Second round
1981–82	3	2ª B	13th	Third round
1982–83	3	2ª B	2nd	
1983–84	2	2ª	15th	First round
1984–85	2	2ª	11th	Round of 16
1985–86	2	2ª	19th	Round of 16
1986–87	3	2ª B	1st	Second round
1987–88	2	2ª	12th	Fourth round
1988–89	2	2ª	3rd	Round of 32
1989–90	1	1ª	18th	Round of 16
1990–91	1	1ª	14th	Fifth round
1991–92	1	1ª	13th	Fifth round

Season	Tier	Division	Place	Copa del Rey
1992–93	1	1ª	5th	Third round
1993–94	1	1ª	10th	Semi-finals
1994–95	1	1ª	15th	Third round
1995–96	1	1ª	5th	Quarter-finals
1996–97	1	1ª	9th	Round of 16
1997–98	1	1ª	16th	Second round
1998–99	1	1ª	19th	Fourth round
1999–2000	2	2ª	14th	Second round
2000–01	2	2ª	3rd	Round of 16
2001–02	1	1ª	19th	Round of 64
2002–03	2	2ª	8th	Round of 64
2003–04	2	2ª	8th	Round of 64
2004–05	2	2ª	9th	Round of 32
2005–06	2	2ª	18th	First round
2006–07	2	2ª	7th	Second round
2007–08	2	2ª	11th	Third round
2008–09	2	2ª	3rd	Third round
2009–10	1	1ª	19th	Round of 32
2010–11	2	2ª	20th	Second round
2011–12	3	2ª B	2nd	First round

Season	Tier	Division	Place	Copa del Rey
2012–13	3	2ª B	1st	Second round
2013–14	2	2ª	11th	Second round
2014–15	2	2ª	17th	Second round
2015–16	2	2ª	13th	Second round
2016–17	2	2ª	4th	Third round
2017–18	2	2ª	11th	Round of 32
2018–19	2	2ª	16th	Second round
2019–20	2	2ª	12th	Round of 16
2020–21	2	2ª	14th	Round of 32
2021–22	2	2ª	5th	Second round
2022–23	2	2ª	10th	Second round
2023–24	2	2ª	12th	Round of 16
2024–25	2	2ª	20th	Round of 32
2025–26	3	1ª Fed.	1st	Second round
2026–27	2	2ª		

- 13 seasons in La Liga
- 49 seasons in Segunda División
- 1 season in Primera Federación
- 8 seasons in Segunda División B
- 3 seasons in Tercera División

=== European cup history ===
Season	Competition	Round	Opponent	Home	Away	Aggregate
1993–94	UEFA Cup	First round	(France) Auxerre	2–2	1–0	3–2
1993–94	UEFA Cup	Second round	(Greece) Olympiacos	2–1	3–4	5–5
1993–94	UEFA Cup	Third round	(Italy) Juventus	2–1	0–3	2–4
1996–97	UEFA Cup	First round	(Israel) Maccabi Tel Aviv	3–2	1–1	4–3
1996–97	UEFA Cup	Second round	(Italy) Lazio	5–3	0–1	5–4
1996–97	UEFA Cup	Third round	(Netherlands) Feyenoord	0–0	4–2	4–2
1996–97	UEFA Cup	Quarter-finals	(Denmark) Brøndby	0–1	2–0	2–1
1996–97	UEFA Cup	Semi-finals	(Germany) Schalke 04	1–0	0–2	1–2

== Honours ==
=== Domestic ===
- Segunda División (1): 1960–61
- Tercera División (1): 1970–71
- Segunda División B (1): 1986–87
- Teide Trophy (28): 1973, 1974, 1976, 1981, 1982, 1984, 1986, 1989, 1991, 1992, 1993, 1994, 1995, 1996, 1998, 1999, 2003, 2004, 2007, 2008, 2010, 2013, 2015, 2016, 2018, 2022, 2023, 2025

== Current squad ==
As of 3 November 2026

Note: Flags indicate national team as defined under FIFA eligibility rules; some limited exceptions apply. Players may hold more than one non-FIFA nationality.

No.	Pos.	Nation	Player
1	GK	ESP	Dani Martín
2	DF	ESP	David Rodríguez
3	DF	CRO	Roko Jureškin
4	DF	ESP	José León
5	DF	ESP	Jorge Moreno
6	MF	ESP	Juanjo Sánchez
7	MF	SLO	Martin Pečar
8	FW	ESP	Víctor Moreno
10	MF	ESP	Nacho Gil
11	FW	ESP	Noel López
12	DF	ECU	Anthony Landázuri
14	DF	ESP	Gerard Valentín
15	MF	BRA	Fabricio

No.	Pos.	Nation	Player
16	MF	ESP	Jesús Álvarez
17	FW	SEN	Christian Gomis (on loan from Schalke 04)
18	FW	ESP	Enric Gallego
19	DF	ESP	César Álvarez
20	MF	ARG	Mauro Pittón
21	DF	ESP	Marc Mateu
22	FW	ARM	Grant-Leon Ranos
23	MF	BIH	Anes Krdžalić
24	FW	ESP	Iván Chapela
26	FW	ESP	Baba Diocou
27	DF	NED	Neal Viereck (on loan from FC Utrecht)
29	MF	ESP	Dani Fernández
40	GK	ESP	Gabri De Vuyst

=== Reserve team ===
Note: Flags indicate national team as defined under FIFA eligibility rules; some limited exceptions apply. Players may hold more than one non-FIFA nationality.

No.	Pos.	Nation	Player
28	DF	ESP	Pau Fernández
30	GK	ESP	Sergio Aragoneses

No.	Pos.	Nation	Player
31	MF	ESP	Joel Pérez
33	FW	ESP	Óscar Bazaga

=== Other players under contract ===
Note: Flags indicate national team as defined under FIFA eligibility rules; some limited exceptions apply. Players may hold more than one non-FIFA nationality.

No.	Pos.	Nation	Player
—	MF	GBS	Alassan Manjam
—	FW	GBS	Salifo Caropitche

=== Out on loan ===
Note: Flags indicate national team as defined under FIFA eligibility rules; some limited exceptions apply. Players may hold more than one non-FIFA nationality.

No.	Pos.	Nation	Player
—	MF	ESP	Alberto Ulloa (at Lugo until 30 June 2027)
—	MF	ESP	Jeremy Jorge (at Rayo Majadahonda until 30 June 2027)
—	MF	ESP	Josep Calavera (at Ibiza until 30 June 2027)

No.	Pos.	Nation	Player
—	FW	ESP	Fran Sabina (at Alcorcón until 30 June 2027)
—	FW	ESP	Mahamadou Baldé (at Muaither until 30 June 2027)

=== Current technical staff ===
Position	Staff
Head coach	(Spain) Álvaro Cervera
Assistant coach	(Spain) Roberto Perera
Analyst	(Spain) Carlos Rodríguez
Goalkeeping coach	(Spain) Zeben Ortiz
Fitness coach	(Spain) Maykol Hernández (Spain) Adolfo Mayordomo
Rehab fitness coach	(Spain) Yeray Abreu (Spain) Santi Álvarez
Delegate	(Spain) Víctor Padrón
Team manager	(Spain) Toño Hernández
Director of security	(Spain) Máximo Bethencourt
Kit man	(Spain) Angel Suárez (Spain) Jonathan García
Head of medical services	(Spain) Norberto Marrero Gordillo
Head of physiotherapist	(Spain) José Cristóbal Rodríguez
Physiotherapist	(Spain) Alba Pestano (Spain) Nicolás García (Spain) Alfredo Temmler
Nutritionist	(Spain) Alejandro Triviño
Podiatrist	(Spain) Marta Pérez

Last updated: 20 November 2024
Source: Club Deportivo Tenerife (in Spanish)

== International players ==
- (Argentina) Christian Bassedas
- (Argentina) Oscar Dertycia
- (Argentina) Esteban Fuertes
- (Argentina) Diego Latorre
- (Argentina) Gerardo Martino
- (Argentina) Hugo Morales
- (Argentina) Marcelo Ojeda
- (Argentina) Nico Paz
- (Argentina) Pablo Paz
- (Argentina) Martín Posse
- (Argentina) Fernando Redondo
- (Armenia) Grant-Leon Ranos
- (Australia) Aurelio Vidmar
- (Austria) Stefan Lexa
- (Bosnia and Herzegovina) Meho Kodro
- (Brazil) André Luiz
- (Brazil) César Belli
- (Brazil) Guina
- (Brazil) Leandro
- (Cameroon) Daniel Kome
- (Chile) Francisco Rojas
- (Colombia) Navarro Montoya
- (Colombia) Pedro Portocarrero
- (Czech Republic) Pavel Hapal
- (Denmark) Riza Durmisi
- (Equatorial Guinea) Juvenal
- (Georgia (country)) Otar Kakabadze
- (Germany) Robert Enke
- (Germany) Oliver Neuville
- (Ghana) Brimah Razak
- (Guinea) Thierno
- (Haiti) Frantz Bertin
- (Honduras) Bryan Acosta
- (Honduras) Juan Carlos García
- (Honduras) Anthony Lozano
- (Honduras) Ramón Maradiaga
- (Honduras) Darixon Vuelto
- (Honduras) Gilberto Yearwood
- (Israel) Gal Alberman
- (Japan) Gaku Shibasaki
- (Malaysia) Gabriel Palmero
- (Martinique) Samuel Camille
- (Mexico) Gerardo Torrado
- (Montenegro) Nikola Šipčić
- (Morocco) Moulay El Ghareff
- (Netherlands) Roy Makaay
- (Netherlands) Ferdi Vierklau
- (Panama) Rommel Fernández
- (Paraguay) Alcides Báez
- (Paraguay) César Cabrera
- (Paraguay) Crispín Maciel
- (Peru) José del Solar
- (Peru) Percy Olivares
- (Poland) Tomasz Frankowski
- (Portugal) Bino
- (Portugal) Domingos
- (Russia) Igor Simutenkov
- (Senegal) Sylvain N'Diaye
- (Senegal) Amath Ndiaye
- (Serbia) Miroslav Đukić
- (Serbia) Slaviša Jokanović
- (Serbia) Veljko Paunović
- (Serbia) Uroš Račić
- (Slovakia) Róbert Mazáň
- (Slovakia) Samuel Slovák
- (South Africa) Sizwe Motaung
- (South Africa) David Nyathi
- (Spain) Juan Carlos Aguilera
- (Spain) Francisco Arencibia
- (Spain) Ángel Arocha
- (Spain) Rubén Cano
- (Spain) Chano
- (Spain) Ignacio Conte
- (Spain) Curro Torres
- (Spain) Diego Rodríguez
- (Spain) Quique Estebaranz
- (Spain) Albert Ferrer
- (Spain) Foncho
- (Spain) Luis García
- (Spain) Gabriel Jorge
- (Spain) Juanele
- (Spain) Martín Marrero
- (Spain) Felipe Martín
- (Spain) Felipe Miñambres
- (Spain) Mista
- (Spain) Luis Molowny
- (Spain) José Manuel Ochotorena
- (Spain) Ayoze Pérez
- (Spain) Pier
- (Spain) Juan Antonio Pizzi
- (Spain) Eleuterio Santos
- (Spain) Víctor
- (Spain) Voro
- (Sweden) Bengt Andersson
- (Tanzania) Shaaban Chilunda
- (Tunisia) Haythem Jouini
- (United States) Shaq Moore
- (Uruguay) Carlos Correa
- (Uruguay) Javier Zeoli
- (Venezuela) Julio Álvarez
- (Venezuela) Dani Hernández
- (Venezuela) Jonay Hernández
- (Venezuela) Rafa Ponzo
- (Venezuela) Josmar Zambrano

== Notable coaches ==
- (Argentina) Carlos Aimar
- (Argentina) Vicente Cantatore
- (Argentina) Ángel Cappa
- (Argentina) Felipe Mesones
- (Argentina) Jorge Solari
- (Argentina) Jorge Valdano
- (Serbia) Ljubiša Broćić
- (Serbia) Dragoljub Milošević
- (Germany) Jupp Heynckes
- (Germany) Bernd Krauss
- (Germany) Ewald Lienen
- (Italy) Mauro Sandreani
- (Paraguay) Heriberto Herrera
- (Portugal) Artur Jorge
- (Spain) Raül Agné
- (Spain) David Amaral
- (Spain) Gonzalo Arconada
- (Spain) Xabier Azkargorta
- (Spain) Rubén Baraja
- (Spain) José Antonio Barrios
- (Spain) Rafael Benítez
- (Spain) Antonio Calderón
- (Spain) Paco Campos
- (Spain) Fernando Castro Santos
- (Spain) Casuco
- (Spain) Álvaro Cervera
- (Spain) Luis César Sampedro
- (Spain) Javier Clemente
- (Spain) Ignacio Eizaguirre
- (Spain) Joseba Etxeberria
- (Spain) Fran Fernández
- (Spain) Víctor Fernández
- (Spain) Rafael García Cortés
- (Spain) García Verdugo
- (Spain) Satur Grech
- (Spain) Benito Joanet
- (Spain) Joseíto
- (Spain) Juanma Lillo
- (Spain) Aritz López Garai
- (Spain) Antonio López
- (Spain) Juan Carlos Mandiá
- (Spain) José Luis Martí
- (Spain) Quique Medina
- (Spain) Pepe Mel
- (Spain) Alfredo Merino
- (Spain) Vicente Miera
- (Spain) Felipe Miñambres
- (Spain) Pepe Moré
- (Spain) José Luis Oltra
- (Spain) José Planas
- (Spain) Enric Rabassa
- (Spain) Luis Miguel Ramis
- (Spain) Sesé Rivero
- (Spain) Manuel Sanchís
- (Spain) Antonio Tapia
- (Spain) Eduardo Toba
- (Uruguay) Dagoberto Moll
- (Uruguay) Héctor Núñez

== Supporter ==
Supporter of Tenerife are called Chicharreros because in early days, the inhabitants of a small fishing village called Santa Cruz (later the capital of Tenerife) consumed "chicharros" (Atlantic horse mackerel) as a main part of their diet.

Other inhabitants of Tenerife and the Canary Islands used the moniker as a pejorative name, but finally the inhabitants of Santa Cruz accepted it affectionately.

== See also ==
- CD Tenerife B
- Unión Deportiva Tenerife
