= Gonzalo Arconada =

Spanish football manager

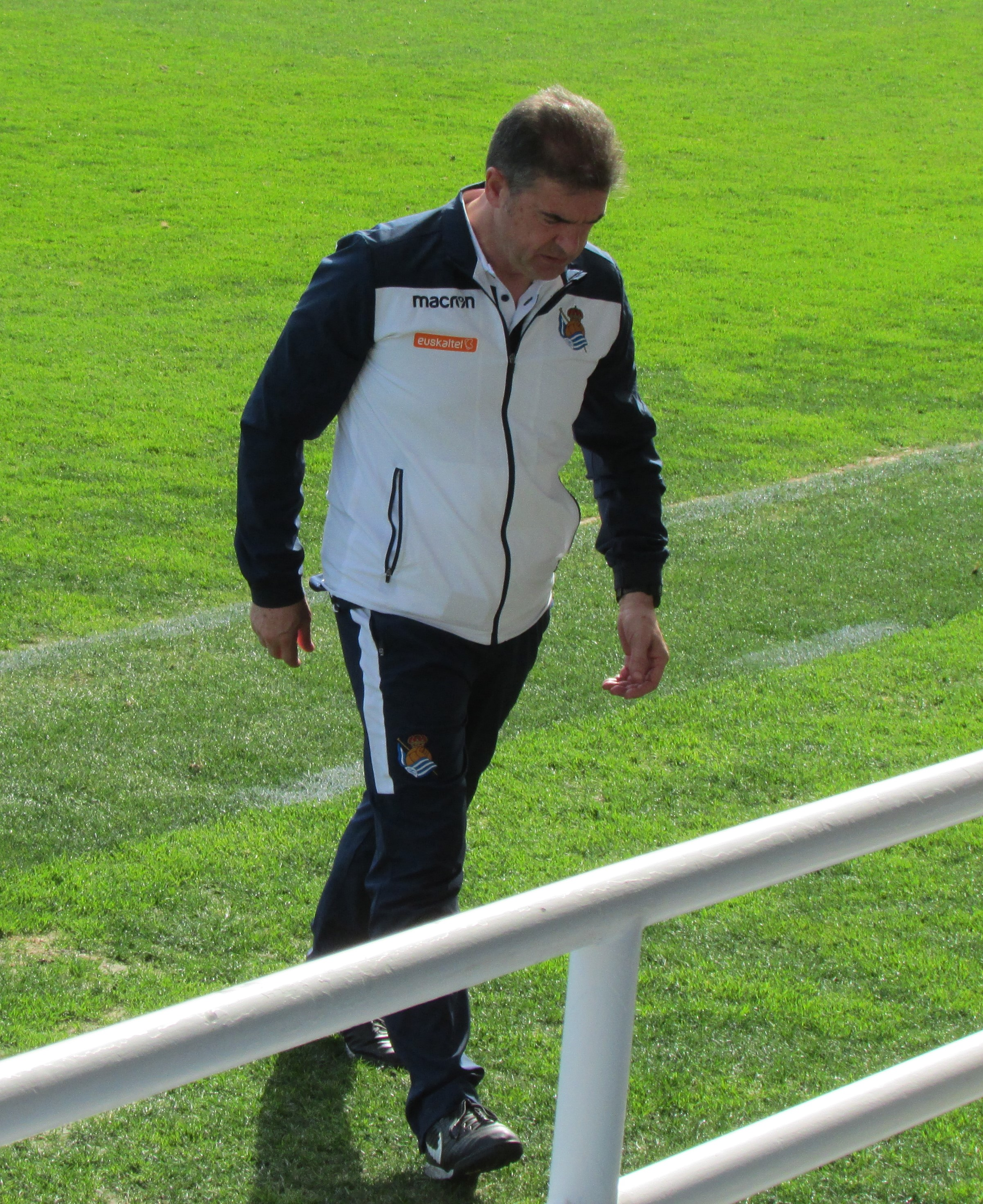
- Arconada in 2019

Personal information
- Full name: Gonzalo Arconada Echarri
- Date of birth: 23 July 1961 (age 65)
- Place of birth: San Sebastián, Spain

Managerial career
- Years: Team
- 1991–1998: Real Unión
- 1998–1999: Tolosa
- 1999–2001: Beasain
- 2001–2006: Real Sociedad B
- 2006: Real Sociedad
- 2006–2007: Burgos
- 2007–2008: Numancia
- 2008: Almería
- 2009–2010: Numancia
- 2010: Tenerife
- 2013: Mirandés
- 2015: Burgos
- 2015–2016: Jaén
- 2017: Barakaldo
- 2017–2020: Real Sociedad (women)

Gonzalo Arconada Echarri (born 23 July 1961) is a Spanish football manager.

== Coaching career ==
Arconada was born in San Sebastián, Gipuzkoa, and started coaching while still in his teens, with youth sides Juveniles de La Salle and Danak. His first twenty years would be spent with teams in his native region, mostly in the lower levels. After being in charge of the reserve team for several seasons, he coached Real Sociedad's main squad for a couple of months in 2006, being one of three managers during the campaign in La Liga.

After managing lowly Burgos CF and attaining promotion to the top division in 2008 with CD Numancia, Arconada signed with UD Almería. After a preseason without defeats, he was sacked in late December 2008 following a 1–0 loss at El Molinón, Sporting de Gijón's grounds, being replaced by Hugo Sánchez.

In the summer of 2009, Arconada returned to Numancia again in the second level, leaving his post at the end of the season after leading the Soria side to the eighth position. In August he moved to CD Tenerife, recently relegated from the top flight, being dismissed the following month after four losses in as many games.

On 21 November 2017, Arconada took the helm of the women's team of Real Sociedad. On 11 May 2019 he led them to their first ever title by winning the Copa de la Reina de Fútbol, after beating Atlético Madrid 2–1; on 30 June 2020, he left after his contract expired.

== Personal life ==
Arconada's older brother, Luis, played 15 years with Real Sociedad, being widely regarded as one of the best goalkeepers in the nation's history.

== Honours ==
Numancia

- Segunda División: 2007–08

Real Sociedad (women)

- Copa de la Reina: 2018–19
