= 1982–83 Real Madrid CF season =

52nd season in existence of Real Madrid CF

Real Madrid CF
1982–83 season
- President: Luis de Carlos
- Head coach: Alfredo Di Stéfano
- Stadium: Santiago Bernabéu
- Primera Division: Runner-up (in UEFA Cup)
- Copa del Rey: Runner-up
- European Cup Winners' Cup: Runner-up
- Copa de la Liga: Runner-up
- Supercopa de España: Runner-up
- Top goalscorer: League: Pineda (11); All: Santillana (30)
| Home colours | Away colours |

The 1982–83 season is Real Madrid Club de Fútbol's 81st season in existence and the club's 52nd consecutive season in the top flight of Spanish football.

== Summary ==
Club legend Alfredo Di Stéfano came back to the club as head coach in a high-expected movement after he was La Liga champion managing Valencia CF in 1971. The arrive of Di Stefano as the team head coach was delayed by then club president Santiago Bernabeu -who died in 1978– after personal issues aroused since 1964 when the Argentine striker rejected his offer to retire with an administrative spot in the club and chose to play two more seasons with RCD Espanyol.

Finally, after a long turmoil lasting almost a year Incumbent Luis de Carlos won the reelection as President of the club on 9 October 1982 defeating the electoral campaign of challenger Ramon Mendoza by more than 3,000 votes. Mendoza was linked by Cambio 16 magazine with Soviet Spy agency KGB, prompting to quit his position as vice-president on board of directors during Autumn.

After a failed bid on Allan Simonsen, De Carlos reinforced the club with low-profile players such as Dutch defender John Metgod from AZ Alkmaar English striker Laurie Cunningham suffered injury issues during almost the entire campaign and was loaned out by the club to Manchester United in April.

The campaign is best remembered by the bizarre fact of five trophies closely lost, four of them in four closely contested finals (Supercopa, European Cup Winners' Cup, Copa del Rey and Copa de La Liga). Besides that, in La Liga the squad finished in 2nd place a single point behind champions basque-side Athletic Bilbao after losing 0–1 against former Di Stefano club Valencia in the ultimate match at Mestalla Stadium. Madrid were leading most of the rounds before the game and only needed a draw to clinch the title.

== Squad ==
Note: Flags indicate national team as defined under FIFA eligibility rules; some limited exceptions apply. Players may hold more than one non-FIFA nationality.

| No. | Pos. | Nation | Player |
|---|---|---|---|
| — | GK | ESP | Agustín |
| — | GK | ESP | García Remón |
| — | GK | ESP | Miguel Ángel |
| — | DF | ESP | Juan José |
| — | DF | ESP | Paco Bonet |
| — | DF | NED | John Metgod |
| — | DF | ESP | Alfonso Fraile |
| — | DF | ESP | Isidoro San José |
| — | DF | ESP | Rafael García Cortés |
| — | DF | ESP | Salguero |
| — | DF | ESP | Chendo |
| — | DF | ESP | José Antonio Camacho |

| No. | Pos. | Nation | Player |
|---|---|---|---|
| — | MF | FRG | Uli Stielike |
| — | MF | ESP | Ricardo Gallego |
| — | MF | ESP | Ángel |
| — | MF | ESP | Miguel Ángel Portugal |
| — | MF | ESP | Vicente del Bosque |
| — | MF | ESP | García Hernández |
| — | MF | URU | Juan Alberto Acosta |
| — | FW | ESP | Santillana |
| — | FW | ESP | Juanito |
| — | FW | ESP | Pineda García |
| — | FW | ESP | Isidro |
| — | FW | ESP | Ito |
| — | FW | ESP | Cholo |

=== Transfers ===
In
| Pos. | Name | from | Type |
|---|---|---|---|
| DF | John Metgod | AZ Alkmaar | |
| DF | Juan José | Cádiz CF | |
| DF | Paco Bonet | Elche CF | |
| FW | Cholo | Burgos CF | |
| DF | Juan Alberto Acosta | S.D. Aucas | |

Out
| Pos. | Name | To | Type |
|---|---|---|---|
| DF | Garcia Navajas | Real Valladolid | |
| DF | Andrés Sabido | RCD Mallorca | |
| DF | Goyo Benito | | retired |
| FW | Laurie Cunningham | Manchester United | loan |
| DF | Pérez García | Elche CF | |

== Competitions ==
=== La Liga ===
==== League table ====
| Pos | Team | Pld | W | D | L | GF | GA | GD | Pts | Qualification or relegation |
|---|---|---|---|---|---|---|---|---|---|---|
| 1 | Athletic Bilbao (C) | 34 | 22 | 6 | 6 | 71 | 36 | +35 | 50 | Qualification for the European Cup first round |
| 2 | Real Madrid | 34 | 20 | 9 | 5 | 57 | 25 | +32 | 49 | Qualification for the UEFA Cup first round |
| 3 | Atlético Madrid | 34 | 20 | 6 | 8 | 56 | 38 | +18 | 46 | Qualification for the UEFA Cup first round |
| 4 | Barcelona | 34 | 17 | 10 | 7 | 60 | 29 | +31 | 44 | Qualification for the Cup Winners' Cup first round (Note: Barcelona qualified for the European Cup Winners' Cup by winning the Copa del Rey.) |
| 5 | Sevilla | 34 | 15 | 12 | 7 | 44 | 31 | +13 | 42 | Qualification for the UEFA Cup first round |

Source: BDFútbol
Rules for classification: 1) Points; 2) Head-to-head results; 3) Goal difference; 4) Number of goals scored
(C) Champions

==== Position by round ====
| Round | 1 | 2 | 3 | 4 | 5 | 6 | 7 | 8 | 9 | 10 | 11 | 12 | 13 | 14 | 15 | 16 | 17 | 18 | 19 | 20 | 21 | 22 | 23 | 24 | 25 | 26 | 27 | 28 | 29 | 30 | 31 | 32 | 33 | 34 |
|---|---|---|---|---|---|---|---|---|---|---|---|---|---|---|---|---|---|---|---|---|---|---|---|---|---|---|---|---|---|---|---|---|---|---|
| Ground | A | H | A | H | A | H | A | H | A | H | A | H | H | A | H | A | H | H | A | H | A | H | A | H | A | H | A | H | A | A | H | A | H | A |
| Result | D | W | W | W | D | W | D | W | D | W | W | W | L | W | W | L | W | W | D | W | D | D | L | W | W | W | D | W | D | L | W | W | W | L |
| Position | 6 | 4 | 3 | 2 | 1 | 1 | 1 | 1 | 1 | 1 | 1 | 1 | 1 | 1 | 1 | 1 | 1 | 1 | 1 | 1 | 1 | 1 | 2 | 2 | 1 | 1 | 2 | 2 | 1 | 2 | 1 | 1 | 1 | 2 |

Source: www.lfp.es
A = Away; H = Home; W = Win; D = Draw; L = Loss; = Leader, 1983–84 European Cup; = 1983–84 UEFA Cup

==== Matches ====
| 5 September 1982 1 | Real Valladolid | 2–2 | Real Madrid | Valladolid |
| | Alonso 20'; Erwood 48' (pen.) (yellow card); Mar (yellow card) | Report | 76' Stielike; 89' Stielike; (yellow card) Juanito; (yellow card) Bonet; (yellow card) Salguero | Stadium: Jose Zorrilla; Referee: Manuel Marquenda |

| 11 September 1982 2 | Real Madrid | 1–0 | Sevilla CF | Madrid |
| | Stielike 56' (pen.) (yellow card); Bonet (yellow card) | Report | (yellow card) Buyo; (yellow card) A.Alvares; (yellow card) H.Alvares; (yellow card) San Jose; (yellow card) Santi | Stadium: Santiago Bernabeu; Referee: Jose Perez |

| 18 September 1982 3 | Real Zaragoza | 0–1 | Real Madrid | Zaragoza |
| | Morgado (yellow card) | Report | 54' Juanito; (yellow card) San Jose; (yellow card) Bonet | Stadium: La Romareda; Referee: Bartolome Madrid |

| 26 September 1982 4 | Real Madrid | 3–1 | Atlético Madrid | Madrid |
| | Ito 34'; Gonzalez 50'; Pineda Garcia 80' | Report | Rubio 59'; Arteche (yellow card); Juanjo (yellow card); Prieto (yellow card) | Stadium: Santiago Bernabeu; Referee: Victoriano Arminio |

| 3 October 1982 5 | Español | 1–1 | Real Madrid | Barcelona |
| | Lauridsen 36'; Escalza (yellow card); Zuñiga (yellow card); Job (yellow card) | Report | Pineda Garcia 26' (yellow card); (yellow card) Jose Warned; (yellow card) Bonet | Stadium: Sarria; Referee: Jose Perez |

| 10 October 1982 6 | Real Madrid | 1–0 | CD Málaga | Madrid |
| | Santillana 80'; Metgod (yellow card); Gallego (yellow card) | Report | (yellow card) Carlos; (yellow card) Rodriguez; (yellow card) Recio | Stadium: Santiago Bernabeu; Referee: Joaquin Marcos |

| 17 October 1982 7 | Sporting de Gijón | 1–1 | Real Madrid | Gijón |
| | Joaquin 53'; Uriah (yellow card) | Report | 42' Pineda Garcia; (yellow card) Jose | Stadium: El Molinon; Referee: Jose Carrion |

| 24 October 1982 8 | Real Madrid | 5–1 | Racing Santander | Madrid |
| | Santillana 14'; Santillana 53'; Santillana 58'; Hernandez 16'; Sanudo 86' (o.g.); Gonzalez (yellow card) | Report | Sanudo 38'; Alvarez (yellow card) | Stadium: Santiago Bernabeu; Referee: Jose Garaza |

| 31 October 1982 9 | UD Salamanca | 0–0 | Real Madrid | Villares de la Reina |
| | | Report | | Stadium: Estadio Helmántico; Referee: Ildefonso Aspitare |

| 7 November 1982 10 | Real Madrid | 1–0 | Real Betis | Madrid |
| | Santillana 15'; Stielike (yellow card) | Report | Ortega (yellow card) 56' (yellow-red card); Kuiko (yellow card); Canito (yellow card) | Stadium: Santiago Bernabeu; Referee: Felipe Aurre |

| 10 November 1982 11 | Celta Vigo | 0–2 | Real Madrid | Vigo |
| | Canosa (yellow card); Atillano (yellow card) | Report | Santillana 49'; Fraile 60'; Bonet (yellow card) | Stadium: Balaidos; Referee: Bartolome Morro |

| 21 November 1982 12 | Real Madrid | 4–0 | Real Sociedad | Madrid |
| | Juanito 10'; Isidro 33'; Isidro 50'; Isidro 68'; Angel (yellow card) | Report | Gorriz (yellow card); Arconada (yellow card); Alvarez (red card) 80' | Stadium: Santiago Bernabeu; Referee: Jose Perez |

| 27 November 1982 13 | Real Madrid | 0–2 | FC Barcelona | Madrid |
| | Camacho (yellow card); Bonet (yellow card) 67' (yellow-red card); Metgod (yellow card) 67' (yellow-red card); Ángel (yellow card); Stielike (yellow card); Juanito (yellow card) | Report | Esteban Vigo 14'; Quini 86'; Manolo (yellow card); Migueli (yellow card); Victor Muñoz (yellow card) | Stadium: Santiago Bernabeu; Referee: García de Loza |

| 4 December 1982 14 | Athletic Bilbao | 2–4 | Real Madrid | Bilbao |
| | Sarabia 45'; Noriega 80'; Argote (yellow card) | Report | 39' González; 66' González; 47' Gallego; 64' Salguero; (yellow card) Agustin | Stadium: San Mamés; Referee: Jose Carrion |

| 12 December 1982 15 | Real Madrid | 1–0 | UD Las Palmas | Madrid |
| | Camacho 37' | Report | | Stadium: Santiago Bernabeu; Referee: Bartolome Madrid |

| 19 December 1982 16 | Osasuna | 2–1 | Real Madrid | Pamplona |
| | Ripodas 32' (pen.) (yellow card); Echeverria 78' | Report | 42' Santillana; (yellow card) Juanito (yellow card) Bonet | Stadium: El Sadar; Referee: Sebastian Rendon |

| 2 January 1983 17 | Real Madrid | 5–1 | Valencia CF | Madrid |
| | Juanito 20' (pen.); Juanito 30' (yellow card); Ito 50'; Pineda 81'; Gallego 88' | Report | 71' Carrete; (yellow card) Kempes; (yellow card) Subirates | Stadium: Santiago Bernabeu; Referee: Felipe Aurre |

| 6 January 1983 18 | Real Madrid | 2–0 | Real Valladolid | Madrid |
| | Pineda Garcia 54'; Pineda Garcia 84' | Report | | Stadium: Santiago Bernabeu; Referee: Emilio Muro |

| 9 January 1983 19 | Sevilla CF | 2–2 | Real Madrid | Sevilla |
| | Lopez 26'; Metgod 44' (o.g.); Alvarez (yellow card) | Report | 17' Gallego; 19' (pen.) Juanito; (yellow card) Stielike; (yellow card) Pineda Garcia | Stadium: Sanchez Pizjuan; Referee: Victoriano Arminio |

| 16 January 1983 20 | Real Madrid | 1–0 | Real Zaragoza | Madrid |
| | Pineda Garcia 41'; Jose (yellow card) | Report | Kasuko (yellow card); Señor (yellow card) | Stadium: Santiago Bernabeu; Referee: Jose Carrion |

| 23 January 1983 21 | Atlético Madrid | 0–0 | Real Madrid | Madrid |
| | Arteche (yellow card); Villaverde (yellow card); Prieto (yellow card) | Report | (yellow card) Stielike; (yellow card) Fraile | Stadium: Vicente Calderon; Referee: Jose Perez |

| 30 January 1983 22 | Real Madrid | 2–2 | Español | Madrid |
| | Juanito 32'; Juanito 84' (pen.) (yellow card) | Report | 54' Arabi; 71' Orejela; (yellow card) N'Kono | Stadium: Santiago Bernabeu; Referee: Ildefonso Aspitare |

| 6 February 1983 23 | CD Málaga | 2–1 | Real Madrid | Málaga |
| | Rodriguez 66'; Rodriguez 86'; Hurtado (yellow card); Marti (yellow card) | Report | 15' Pineda Garcia; (yellow card) Agustin; (yellow card) Jose | Stadium: La Rosaleda; Referee: Jose Negreira |

| 9 February 1983 24 | Real Madrid | 1–0 | Sporting de Gijón | Madrid |
| | Santillana 49' | Report | | Stadium: Santiago Bernabeu; Referee: Joaquin Velazquez |

| 20 February 1983 25 | Racing Santander | 1–2 | Real Madrid | Santander |
| | Sanudo 54'; Gutierrez (yellow card) | Report | 10' Stielike; 36' Santillana | Stadium: El Sardinero; Referee: Joaquin Marcos |

| 26 February 1983 26 | Real Madrid | 1–0 | UD Salamanca | Madrid |
| | San Jose 25' | Report | | Stadium: Santiago Bernabeu; Referee: Juan Oliver |

| 6 March 1983 27 | Real Betis | 1–1 | Real Madrid | Sevilla |
| | Barnes 66'; Canito (yellow card); Rincon (yellow card) | Report | 71' Angel; (yellow card) San Jose; (yellow card) Gallego | Stadium: Benito Villamarin; Referee: Miguel Lopez |

| 12 March 1983 28 | Real Madrid | 3–0 | Celta Vigo | Madrid |
| | Gallego 53'; Gallego 66'; Pineda 70' | Report | (yellow card) Morey | Stadium: Santiago Bernabeu; Referee: Manuel Hernandez |

| 19 March 1983 29 | Real Sociedad | 0–0 | Real Madrid | San Sebastián |
| | Larrañaga (yellow card) | Report | (red card) 63' Angel | Stadium: Atotxa; Referee: Bartolome Madrid |

| 29 March 1983 30 | FC Barcelona | 2–1 | Real Madrid | Barcelona |
| | Maradona 45' (yellow card); Perico Alonso 77'; Julio Alberto (yellow card); Schuster (yellow card); Esteban Vigo (yellow card) | Report | Juanito 20'; Metgod (yellow card) | Stadium: Camp Nou; Referee: Pes Pérez |

| 3 April 1983 31 | Real Madrid | 2–0 | Athletic Bilbao | Madrid |
| | García Hernández 58'; Pineda García 80' | Report | (yellow card) Liceranzu; (yellow card) Urtubi; (yellow card) Sarabia | Stadium: Estadio Santiago Bernabéu; Referee: Joaquin Marcos |

| 10 April 1983 32 | UD Las Palmas | 0–3 | Real Madrid | Las Palmas |
| | | Report | 40' (yellow card) Juanito; 46' (o.g.) Duran; 68' Salguero | Stadium: Estadio Insular; Referee: Joaquin Velazquez |

| 17 April 1983 33 | Real Madrid | 2–1 | Osasuna | Madrid |
| | Pineda 16'; Angel 45'; Gonzalez (yellow card) | Report | 59' Echeverria | Stadium: Santiago Bernabeu; Referee: Antonio Navarrete |

| 1 May 1983 34 | Valencia CF | 1–0 | Real Madrid | Valencia |
| | Tendillo 39'; Ribes (yellow card); Subirates (yellow card) | Report | (yellow card) Metgod | Stadium: Mestalla; Referee: Bartolome Madrid |

=== Copa del Rey ===
==== Round of 16 ====
| 2 February 1983 | Cádiz CF | 0–0 | Real Madrid | Cádiz |
| | | | | Stadium: Ramón de Carranza; Referee: Miguel Lopez |

| 22 February 1983 | Real Madrid | 4–1 | Cádiz CF | Madrid |
| | Santillana 17'; Santillana 100'; San Jose 96'; Stielike 108' (pen.) Jose Warned | | 3' Meillas | Stadium: Santiago Bernabeu; Referee: Jose Gonzalez |

==== Quarter-finals ====
| 30 March 1983 | Real Madrid | 2–1 | Sevilla CF | Madrid |
| | Metgod 51' (yellow card); Gallego 52' | | 74' Lopez | Stadium: Santiago Bernabeu; Referee: Jose Carrion |

| 13 April 1983 | Sevilla CF | 1–2 | Real Madrid | Madrid |
| | Francisco 47'; Alvarez (yellow card) | | 39' Santillana; 77' Santillana | Stadium: Santiago Bernabeu; Referee: Bartolome Madrid |

==== Semi-finals ====
| 4 May 1983 | Real Madrid | 6–0 | Sporting de Gijón | Madrid |
| | Santillana 10'; Santillana 29'; Santillana 53'; Gonzalez 11'; San Jose 55'; Juanito 65'; Metgod (yellow card); Jose (yellow card) | | (yellow card) Espinoza | Stadium: Santiago Bernabeu; Referee: Juan Oliver |

| 21 May 1983 | Sporting de Gijón | 4–0 | Real Madrid | Madrid |
| | Kundi 8'; Mesa 10'; Mesa 34'; Ferrero 54' (pen.) | | (yellow card) Stielike | Stadium: Santiago Bernabeu; Referee: Jose Perez |

==== Final ====
| 4 June 1983 | FC Barcelona | 2–1 | Real Madrid | Zaragoza |
| 22:15 CET | Víctor 32'; Marcos 90' | Report (in Spanish) | Santillana 50' | Stadium: La Romareda; Attendance: 35,000; Referee: José Luis García Carrión |

=== European Cup Winners' Cup ===
==== Round of 16 ====
| 20 October 1982 | Real Madrid (Spain) | 3–1 | (Hungary) Újpesti Dózsa | Madrid |
| | Santillana 33', 90'; Juanito 37' | Report Report 2 | Kiss 36' | Stadium: Santiago Bernabeu |

| 3 November 1982 | Újpesti Dózsa (Hungary) | 0–1 | (Spain) Real Madrid |
| | | Report Report 2 | Santillana 62' |

==== Quarter-finals ====
| 2 March 1983 | Inter (Italy) | 1–1 | (Spain) Real Madrid | Milan |
| | Oriali 15' | Report Report 2 | 59' Gallego | Stadium: Giuseppe Meazza; Attendance: 80,000; Referee: (Turkey) Talal Tokat |

| 16 March 1983 | Real Madrid (Spain) | 2–1 | (Italy) Inter | Madrid |
| | Salguero 51'; Santillana 56' | Report Report 2 | 20' Altobelli | Stadium: Santiago Bernabeu; Attendance: 90,000; Referee: (Czechoslovakia) Vojtech Christov |

==== Semi-finals ====
| 6 April 1983 | FK Austria Wien | 2–2 | (Spain) Real Madrid | Wien |
| | Polster 4'; Magyar 20' | Report Report 2 | Santillana 6'; San José 53' | Stadium: Ernst-Happel-Stadion; Attendance: 40,000; Referee: Alek Jarguz |

| 20 April 1983 | Real Madrid (Spain) | 3–1 | FK Austria Wien | Madrid |
| | Santillana 10', 83'; Juanito 71' | Report Report 2 | Juan José 68' (o.g.) | Stadium: Santiago Bernabeu; Attendance: 70,000; Referee: Bogdan Dotchev |

==== Final ====
| 11 May 1983 | Aberdeen (Scotland) | 2–1 (a.e.t.) | (Spain) Real Madrid | Gothenburg |
| 20:15 CEST | Black 7'; Hewitt 112' | Report | Juanito 14' (pen.) | Stadium: Nya Ullevi, Attendance: 17,804; Referee: (Italy) Gianfranco Menegali |

=== Copa de la Liga ===
==== Quarter-finals ====
| 12 June 1983 | Real Madrid | 1–0 | Real Sociedad | Madrid |
| | Metgod 44' (yellow card); Pineda Garcia (yellow card) | | (yellow card) Gayate; (yellow card) Orbegozo | Stadium: Santiago Bernabeu; Referee: Miguel Lopez |

| 15 June 1983 | Real Sociedad | 1–1 | Real Madrid | San Sebastián |
| | Cortabarria 22' | | 82' Pineda Garcia; (yellow card) Stielike | Stadium: Atotxa; Referee: Jose Carrion |

==== Semi-finals ====
| 19 June 1983 | Real Zaragoza | 5–3 | Real Madrid | Madrid |
| | Valdano 25'; Señor 32' (pen.); Herrera 47'; Amarilla 67' (yellow card); Guerri (yellow card); Valdano 81' | | Metgod 26'; Juanito 60'; Juanito 78' (pen.); Del Bosque (yellow card); Angel (yellow card); Jose (yellow card) | Stadium: Santiago Bernabeu; Referee: Miguel Lopez and/or Juan Oliver |

| 22 June 1983 | Real Madrid | 5–3 (a.e.t.) (5–4 p) | Real Zaragoza | Madrid |
| | Santillana 35'; Santillana 50'; Santillana 58'; Pineda Garcia 73' (yellow card); Santillana 108' | | Valdano 20'; Amarilla 46'; Amarilla 113' | Stadium: Santiago Bernabeu; Referee: Miguel Lopez and/or Juan Oliver |

==== Final ====
| 26 June 1983 | Real Madrid | 2 – 2 | FC Barcelona | Madrid |
| | Del Bosque 63'; Juanito 69' | | Carrasco 50'; Maradona 57' | Stadium: Santiago Bernabéu; Referee: Ildefonso Urizar Azpitarte |

| 29 June 1983 | FC Barcelona | 2 – 1 | Real Madrid | Barcelona |
| | Maradona 19' (pen.); Alexanko 20' | | Santillana 84' | Stadium: Camp Nou; Referee: Joaquín Ramos Marcos |

=== Supercopa de España ===
| 13 October 1982 | Real Madrid | 1–0 | Real Sociedad | Madrid |
| 21:00 CET | Metgod 44' | | | Stadium: Estadio Santiago Bernabéu; Attendance: 45,000; Referee: José María Enríquez Negreira |

| 28 December 1982 | Real Sociedad | 4–0 (a.e.t.) | Real Madrid | San Sebastián |
| 20:00 CET | Uralde 53', 103'; López Ufarte 91'; Salguero 104' (o.g.) | | | Stadium: Estadio Atocha; Attendance: 30,000; Referee: José Donato Pes Pérez |

== Statistics ==
=== Players statistics ===
| No. | Pos | Nat | Player | Total | | Primera Division | | Copa del Rey | | Copa de la Liga | | Others | |
| No. | Pos | Nat | Player | Apps | Goals | Apps | Goals | Apps | Goals | Apps | Goals | Apps | Goals |
|---|---|---|---|---|---|---|---|---|---|---|---|---|---|
| | GK | (Spain) ESP | Agustín | 46 | -43 | 29 | -22 | 5 | -6 | 2 | -4 | 10 | -11 |
| | DF | (Spain) ESP | Juan José | 50 | 0 | 29+2 | 0 | 6 | 0 | 5 | 0 | 8 | 0 |
| | DF | (Spain) ESP | Bonet | 37 | 0 | 24 | 0 | 4 | 0 | 0 | 0 | 9 | 0 |
| | DF | (Netherlands) NED | Metgod | 56 | 5 | 32 | 0 | 7 | 1 | 6 | 2 | 11 | 2 |
| | DF | (Spain) ESP | Camacho | 55 | 1 | 34 | 1 | 7 | 0 | 4 | 0 | 10 | 0 |
| | MF | (West Germany) FRG | Stielike | 43 | 5 | 27+1 | 4 | 5 | 1 | 3 | 0 | 7 | 0 |
| | MF | (Spain) ESP | Gallego | 50 | 7 | 27 | 5 | 7 | 1 | 6 | 0 | 10 | 1 |
| | MF | (Spain) ESP | Ángel | 49 | 2 | 28 | 2 | 5 | 0 | 5 | 0 | 11 | 0 |
| | FW | (Spain) ESP | Santillana | 48 | 30 | 27 | 9 | 6 | 8 | 4+1 | 5 | 10 | 8 |
| | FW | (Spain) ESP | Juanito | 48 | 17 | 26+2 | 9 | 6 | 1 | 3+1 | 3 | 10 | 4 |
| | FW | (Spain) ESP | Pineda | 34 | 13 | 13+10 | 11 | 2 | 0 | 4 | 2 | 5 | 0 |
| | GK | (Spain) ESP | Remón | 8 | -7 | 5 | -3 | 1 | -1 | 0 | 0 | 2 | -3 |
| | DF | (Spain) ESP | Cortés | 25 | 1 | 25 | 1 | 0 | 0 | 0 | 0 | 0 | 0 |
| | DF | (Spain) ESP | Fraile | 29 | 1 | 10+12 | 1 | 2 | 0 | 0 | 0 | 5 | 0 |
| | DF | (Spain) ESP | San José | 37 | 4 | 13+5 | 1 | 4+2 | 2 | 3+2 | 0 | 8 | 1 |
| | FW | (Spain) ESP | Isidro | 33 | 8 | 13+4 | 6 | 2+2 | 1 | 4 | 0 | 8 | 1 |
| | FW | (Spain) ESP | Ito | 21 | 2 | 12+1 | 2 | 1+1 | 0 | 1+2 | 0 | 3 | 0 |
| | DF | (Spain) ESP | Salguero | 31 | 3 | 9+5 | 2 | 3+2 | 0 | 6 | 0 | 6 | 1 |
| | MF | (Spain) ESP | Portugal | 15 | 0 | 7+5 | 0 | 0 | 0 | 1 | 0 | 2 | 0 |
| | MF | (Spain) ESP | Del Bosque | 17 | 1 | 3+3 | 0 | 2+2 | 0 | 2+2 | 1 | 3 | 0 |
| | MF | (Spain) ESP | Hernández | 9 | 3 | 3 | 2 | 0+2 | 0 | 1+1 | 0 | 2 | 1 |
| | GK | (Spain) ESP | Miguel Ángel | 5 | -11 | 0 | 0 | 1 | -2 | 4 | -9 | 0 | 0 |
| | DF | (Spain) ESP | Chendo | 4 | 0 | 0+2 | 0 | 0 | 0 | 2 | 0 | 0 | 0 |
| | FW | (Spain) ESP | Cholo | 2 | 0 | 2 | 0 | 0 | 0 | 0 | 0 | 0 | 0 |
| | MF | (Uruguay) URU | Acosta | 1 | 0 | 1 | 0 | | | | | | |

- Source: https://www.bdfutbol.com/en/t/t1982-832.html
