= 1983–84 Real Madrid CF season =

82nd season in existence of Real Madrid CF

Real Madrid CF
1983–84 season
- President: Luis de Carlos
- Head coach: Alfredo Di Stéfano
- Stadium: Santiago Bernabéu
- Primera Division: Runner-up (in UEFA Cup)
- Copa del Rey: Semi-finals
- Copa de la Liga: First round
- UEFA Cup: First round
- Top goalscorer: League: Juanito (17); All: Juanito (21)
Home colours	Away colours

The 1983–84 season was Real Madrid Club de Fútbol's 82nd season in existence and the club's 53rd consecutive season in the top flight of Spanish football.

== Summary ==
This season is best remembered for the debut of popular young playmaker Emilio Butragueño and his "La Quinta del Buitre" (Chendo, Sanchis, Martín Vázquez, Pardeza and Michel) a group of teenage players climbing from its reserve team Castilla towards the first team starting a new club era. Owing to financial worries Presidente Luis de Carlos with a narrow space for star players transfers in the club, chose to support rejuvenate the squad for this campaign aimed by successful seasons of basque sides Real Sociedad and Athletic Bilbao with low profile Spanish players being majority in their squads. However, for the second time the club offered a contract to Brazilian midfielder Zico being surpassed in the race by Udinese Calcio which bought him from Flamengo.

Shockingly, the team was early eliminated in the UEFA Cup first round by Czech underdogs side Sparta Prague. Di Stefano managed the team to clinch the first spot of League table for several rounds until March when a 1–1 draw at Pamplona against Osasuna and lost a decisive match at San Mamés against Athletic Bilbao with a 0–1 score collapsed its chances to take the title in favor of basque side Athletic Bilbao despite the two teams finished on League table tied on points. Meanwhile, in 1983–84 Copa del Rey the squad was defeated in semi-finals by, again, Athletic Bilbao after a penalty shoot-out series only three days after the basque team took the title away of Real Madrid on a tie-breaker for the second consecutive year.

During May, the squad was early eliminated by Atlético Madrid in the 1984 Copa de la Liga first round. Forward Juanito won the Pichichi trophy with 17 goals scored in League, tied along Jorge da Silva. After two years as head coach and no-titles clinched, Argentine head coach Alfredo Di Stéfano was sacked by President Luis de Carlos towards the end of campaign.

== Squad ==
Note: Flags indicate national team as defined under FIFA eligibility rules; some limited exceptions apply. Players may hold more than one non-FIFA nationality.

No.	Pos.	Nation	Player
—	GK	ESP	Miguel Ángel
—	GK	ESP	García Remón
—	GK	ESP	Agustín
—	DF	ESP	Chendo
—	DF	ESP	Isidoro San José
—	DF	ESP	Manolo Sanchís
—	DF	ESP	José Antonio Camacho
—	DF	NED	John Metgod
—	DF	ESP	Paco Bonet
—	DF	ESP	Juan José
—	DF	ESP	José Antonio Salguero
—	DF	ESP	Fraile
—	MF	ESP	Bernardo
—	MF	ESP	Juan Lozano

No.	Pos.	Nation	Player
—	MF	ESP	Martín Vázquez
—	MF	FRG	Uli Stielike
—	MF	ESP	Ricardo Gallego
—	MF	ESP	Ángel
—	MF	ESP	Vicente del Bosque
—	FW	ESP	Santillana
—	FW	ESP	Juanito
—	FW	ESP	Isidro
—	FW	ESP	Pineda García
—	FW	ESP	Emilio Butragueño
—	FW	ESP	Miguel Pardeza
—	FW	ESP	Julio Suarez
—	FW	ESP	Ito

=== Transfers ===
In
Pos.	Name	from	Type
DF	Manolo Sanchís	Castilla	
MF	Martín Vázquez	Castilla	
MF	Bernardo	Castilla	
MF	Juan Lozano	RSC Anderlecht	
MF	Julio Suarez	UD Las Palmas	
FW	Emilio Butragueño	Castilla	
FW	Miguel Pardeza	Castilla	
MF	Martín González	Castilla	

Out
Pos.	Name	To	Type
FW	Laurie Cunningham	Sporting Gijón	loan
MF	Miguel Ángel Portugal	Rayo Vallecano	
MF	Francisco García Hernández	CD Castellón	
DF	Rafael García Cortés	Real Zaragoza	

== Competitions ==
=== Primera División ===
==== Position by round ====
Round	1	2	3	4	5	6	7	8	9	10	11	12	13	14	15	16	17	18	19	20	21	22	23	24	25	26	27	28	29	30	31	32	33	34
Ground	H	A	H	A	H	A	H	A	H	A	H	A	H	A	H	A	H	A	H	A	H	A	H	A	H	A	H	A	H	A	H	A	H	A
Result	W	L	L	W	W	L	W	W	W	L	W	W	D	W	W	W	W	L	W	D	D	W	W	W	W	L	D	D	W	L	W	W	W	W
Position	5	12	13	10	9	7	8	3	1	5	2	1	1	1	1	1	1	2	2	2	2	1	1	1	1	1	2	2	2	2	2	2	2	2

Source: www.lfp.es
A = Away; H = Home; W = Win; D = Draw; L = Loss; = 1984–85 European Cup; = 1984–85 UEFA Cup

==== League table ====
Pos	Team	Pld	W	D	L	GF	GA	GD	Pts	Qualification or relegation
1	Athletic Bilbao (C)	34	20	9	5	53	30	+23	49	Qualification for the European Cup first round
2	Real Madrid	34	22	5	7	59	37	+22	49	Qualification for the UEFA Cup first round (Note: Valladolid qualified for the UEFA Cup as winners of the Copa de la Liga.)
3	Barcelona	34	20	8	6	62	28	+34	48	Qualification for the Cup Winners' Cup first round (Note: Barcelona qualified for the European Cup Winners' Cup as runners-up of the Copa del Rey.)
4	Atlético Madrid	34	17	8	9	53	47	+6	42	Qualification for the UEFA Cup first round
5	Real Betis	34	17	4	13	45	40	+5	38	Qualification for the UEFA Cup first round

Source: BDFútbol
Rules for classification: 1) Points; 2) Head-to-head results; 3) Goal difference; 4) Number of goals scored
(C) Champions

==== Matches ====
4 September 1983 1	Real Madrid	2–0	Real Valladolid	Madrid
	Lozano 16'; Santillana 77'; Juanito (yellow card); Metgod (yellow card)	Report		Stadium: Santiago Bernabéu; Referee: Joaquin Velazquez

11 September 1983 2	CD Málaga	6–2	Real Madrid	Málaga
	Toto 20'; Martin 43' 53' 76' (pen.); Canillas 69'; Hurtado 87'; Urdachi (yellow card)	Report	64' (pen.) Juanito; 82' Juanito; (yellow card) Jose; (yellow card) Bernardo	Stadium: Estadio La Rosaleda; Referee: Teodoro Sanchez

18 September 1983 3	Real Madrid	0–1	Valencia CF	Madrid
		Report	39' Kempes; (yellow card) Serrat; (yellow card) Manzanedo; (yellow card) Fernandez	Stadium: Santiago Bernabéu

24 September 1983 4	Real Sociedad	1–3	Real Madrid	San Sebastián
	Uralde 71'; Larrañaga (yellow card)	Report	29' Santillana; 40' Santillana; 36' Lozano; (yellow card) Gonzalez; (yellow card) Stielike	Stadium: Atotxa; Referee: Jose Carrion

2 October 1983 5	Real Madrid	6–2	Cádiz CF	Madrid
	Pineda 62'; Pineda 81'; Juanito 69'; Juanito 87' (pen.); Santillana 75'; Bernardo 89'	Report	31' Gonzalez; 79' Gonzalez; (yellow card) 70' (yellow-red card) Chano; (yellow card) Amarillo	Stadium: Santiago Bernabéu; Referee: Thomas Moreno

9 October 1983 6	Real Zaragoza	3–1	Real Madrid	Zaragoza
	Aineto 5'; Barbas 70'; Valdano 82'	Report	Lozano 80' (pen.)	Stadium: La Romareda; Referee: Emilio Muro

16 October 1983 7	Real Madrid	3–0	UD Salamanca	Madrid
	Juanito 24' 68'; Lozano 51' (o.g.); Gallego (yellow card)	Report	Garcia (yellow card); Gonzalez (yellow card)	Stadium: Santiago Bernabéu; Referee: Jose Garaza

22 October 1983 8	FC Barcelona	1–2	Real Madrid	Barcelona
	Quini 17' (pen.); Alexanko (yellow card); Victor Muñoz (yellow card)	Report	Juanito 12' (pen.); Santillana 20'; Stielike (yellow card); Pineda (yellow card)	Stadium: Camp Nou; Referee: Ramos Marcos

30 October 1983 9	Real Madrid	5–0	Atlético Madrid	Madrid
	Metgod 33' (yellow card); Juanito 36'; Santillana 48'; Stielike 86'; Angel 89'; Bernardo (yellow card)	Report	Arteche (yellow card); Prieto (yellow card); Cabrera (yellow card); Rubio (yellow card)	Stadium: Santiago Bernabéu; Referee: Jose Negreira

5 November 1983 10	Sevilla CF	4–1	Real Madrid	Sevilla
	Lopez 25'; Lopez 54'; Lopez 86'; J.C. Alvarez 34' (yellow card); A.Alvarez (yellow card); Pininho (yellow card); Ruda (yellow card)	Report	63' Angel	Stadium: Sanchez Pizjuan; Referee: Joaquin Velazquez

9 November 1983 11	Real Madrid	2–0	Osasuna	Madrid
	Santillana 29'; Santillana 33'; Camacho (yellow card); Bonet (yellow card)	Report	Candido (yellow card); Castañeda (yellow card)	Stadium: Santiago Bernabéu; Referee: Antonio Navarrete

10 November 1983 12	RCD Mallorca	0–2	Real Madrid	Mallorca
	Delgado (yellow card)	Report	Santillana 53'; Gallego 78' (yellow card)	Stadium: Lluis Sitjar; Referee: Felipe Aurre

27 November 1983 13	Real Madrid	0–0	Athletic Bilbao	Madrid
	Gonzalez (yellow card); Camacho (yellow card)	Report	Argote (yellow card); Sola (yellow card)	Stadium: Santiago Bernabéu; Referee: Miguel Lopez

4 December 1983 14	Real Murcia	0–1	Real Madrid	Murcia
	Ramirez (yellow card)	Report	82' Sanchis	Stadium: La Condomina; Referee: Victoriano Arminio

11 December 1983 15	Real Madrid	2–1	Sporting Gijón	Madrid
	Pineda 68' 82'; Gallego (yellow card); Chendo (yellow card)	Report	Makeda 87'; Espinosa (yellow card); Nacho (yellow card)	Stadium: Santiago Bernabéu; Referee: Teodoro Sanchez

14 December 1983 16	Real Valladolid	0–2	Real Madrid	Valladolid
	Valles (yellow card); More (red card) 68'	Report	Sanchis 13'; Gallego 71'	Stadium: Jose Zorrilla; Referee: Emilio Muro

31 December 1983 17	Real Madrid	1–0	Español	Madrid
	Juanito 58'; Camacho (yellow card)	Report	Sabezas (yellow card); Angel (yellow card)	Stadium: Santiago Bernabéu; Referee: Juan Oliver

7 January 1984 18	Real Betis	4–1	Real Madrid	Sevilla
	Mantilla 9'; Paco 34'; Calderón 45'; Suarez 64'; Cardeñosa (yellow card); Ortega (yellow card)	Report	Juanito 89' (pen.); Stielike (yellow card); Angel (yellow card)	Stadium: Benito Villamarin; Referee: Jose Negreira

15 January 1984 19	Real Madrid	1–0	CD Málaga	Madrid
	Juanito 46' (pen.)	Report		Stadium: Santiago Bernabéu; Referee: Jose Gonzalez

22 January 1984 20	Valencia CF	0–0	Real Madrid	Valencia
	Tendillo (yellow card); Subirates (yellow card); Garcia-Pitarch (yellow card)	Report	(yellow card) Gallego	Stadium: Mestalla; Referee: Felipe Aurre

29 January 1985 21	Real Madrid	0–0	Real Sociedad	Madrid
	Stielike (yellow card); Vazquez (yellow card)	Report	Gajate (yellow card); Murillo (yellow card); Sagarazu (yellow card)	Stadium: Santiago Bernabéu; Referee: Jose Carrion

5 February 1984 22	Cádiz CF	2–3	Real Madrid	Cádiz
	Benito 27'; Meillas 33'; Chano (yellow card); Escobar (yellow card); Vikles (yellow card)	Report	Butrageno 60'; Butragueno 89' Gallego 88' Sanchis (yellow card)	Stadium: Ramon de Carranza; Referee: Jose Garaza

12 February 1984 23	Real Madrid	1–0	Real Zaragoza	Madrid
	Juanito 14' (pen.) (yellow card); Bonet (yellow card)	Report	Barbas (yellow card); Conde (yellow card); Salva (yellow card)	Stadium: La Romareda; Referee: Ildefonso Aspitare

19 February 1984 24	UD Salamanca	0–1	Real Madrid	Villares de la Reina
	Arjen (yellow card); Angel (yellow card); Mikanovich (yellow card) 89' (yellow-red card)	Report	Jose 21'; Stielike (yellow card); San Jose (yellow card); Angel (yellow card); Juanito (yellow card)	Stadium: Estadio Helmántico; Referee: Sebastian Rendon

25 February 1984 25	Real Madrid	2–1	FC Barcelona	Madrid
	Juanito 16'; Santillana 80'; Ángel (yellow card); Bernardo (yellow card); Santillana (yellow card); Sanchis	Report	Maradona 56' (yellow card); Tente Sanchez (yellow card)	Stadium: Santiago Bernabéu; Referee: Ramos Marcos

4 March 1984 26	Atlético Madrid	1–0	Real Madrid	Madrid
	Sánchez 53' (pen.) (yellow card); Arteche (yellow card); Landaburu (yellow card)	Report	Jose (yellow card)	Stadium: Vicente Calderón; Referee: Felipe Aurre

11 March 1984 27	Real Madrid	2–2	Sevilla CF	Madrid
	Juanito 16'; Juanito 45' (pen.) (yellow card)	Report	Alvarez 4' 29'; Magdaleno (yellow card); Rivas (yellow card)	Stadium: Santiago Bernabéu; Referee: Tomas Moreno

18 March 1984 28	Osasuna	1–1	Real Madrid	Pamplona
	Irigibel 51'; Echeverria (yellow card); Lushumberri (yellow card) (yellow card) 74' (yellow-red card)	Report	Santillana 35'; Stielike (yellow card)	Stadium: El Sadar; Referee: Jose Negreira

25 March 1984 29	Real Madrid	2–0	RCD Mallorca	Madrid
	Vasquez 29'; Sanchis 58'	Report	(yellow card) Mulnar	Stadium: Santiago Bernabéu; Referee: Francisco Borrego

1 April 1984 30	Athletic Bilbao	2–1	Real Madrid	Bilbao
	Goikoetxea 32' (yellow card); Dani 87' (yellow card)	Report	Stielike 23' (yellow card); Sanchis (yellow card)	Stadium: San Mamés; Referee: Joaquin Marcos

8 April 1984 31	Real Madrid	3–2	Real Murcia	Madrid
	Juanito 40' (pen.); Santillana 56'; Gallego 81'	Report	Figueroa 23'; Del Barrio 82'; Garcia (yellow card)	Stadium: Santiago Bernabéu; Referee: Miguel Lopez

14 April 1984 32	Sporting Gijón	1–2	Real Madrid	Gijón
	Maceda 70' (yellow card) 72' (yellow-red card)	Report	Camacho 10'; Stielike 89'; Pineda (yellow card); Gallego (yellow card)	Stadium: El Molinon; Referee: Juan Libero

22 April 1984 33	Real Madrid	2–1	Real Valladolid	Madrid
	Salghero 16'; Santillana 53'; Angel (yellow card)	Report	Da Silva 72' (yellow card)	Stadium: Santiago Bernabéu

29 April 1984 34	RCD Espanyol	1–2	Real Madrid	Barcelona
	Orejuela 55'; Lauridsen (yellow card); Gallart (yellow card); Marquez (yellow card)	Report	69' (pen.) Butrageno; 83' (pen.) Butragueno	Stadium: Sarria; Referee: Raul de Loza

=== Copa del Rey ===
==== Second round ====
12 October 1983	CD Badajoz	1–2	Real Madrid	Badajoz
	Gonzalez 12'	Report	Bernardo 2'; Suarez 31'	Stadium: Nuevo Vivero; Referee: Manuel Markenda

19 October 1983	Real Madrid	7–1	CD Badajoz	Madrid
	Juanito 10'; Juanito 18'; Pineda 38'; Pineda 62'; Píneda 72'; Stielike 44'; Metgod 78'	Report	Ordas 82' (yellow card); Bernabe (yellow card)	Stadium: Santiago Bernabéu; Referee: Antonio del Barrio

==== Third round ====
1 November 1983	Real Oviedo	0–1	Real Madrid	Oviedo
	Uriah (yellow card)	Report	Pineda 20' (yellow card)	Stadium: Carlos Tartiere; Referee: Ildefonso Aspitare

23 November 1983	Real Madrid	2–0	Real Oviedo	Madrid
	Angel 79'; Santillana 80'	Report	Segundo (yellow card)	Stadium: Santiago Bernabéu; Referee: Sebastian Rendon

==== Fourth round ====
8 December 1983	CE Sabadell	1–2	Real Madrid	Sabadell
	Randes 45'; Romer (yellow card); Eskalza (yellow card); Hans (yellow card)	Report	Pineda 9'; Camacho 39' (yellow card)	Stadium: Creu Alta; Referee: Jose Carrion

22 December 1983	Real Madrid	3–1	CE Sabadell	Madrid
	Juanito 13'; Pineda 36'; San Jose 64'; Bernardo (yellow card)	Report	Holobart 38'	Stadium: Santiago Bernabéu; Referee: Sebastian Rendon

==== Round of 16 ====
25 January 1984	FC Barcelona Atlètic	0–0	Real Madrid	Barcelona
21:00 CET		Report (in Spanish)	Jose (yellow card); Suarez (yellow card)	Stadium: Mini Estadi; Referee: Urío Velázquez

8 February 1984	Real Madrid	1–0	FC Barcelona Atlètic	Madrid
21:00 CET	Santillana 43'	Report (in Spanish)		Stadium: Santiago Bernabéu; Attendance: 25,000; Referee: Bayarri Ribelles

==== Quarter-finals ====
22 February 1984	Deportivo de La Coruña	2–1	Real Madrid	A Coruña
20:30 CET	Moreno 32'; Bonet 53' (o.g.)	Report (in Spanish)	Ángel 30'	Stadium: Riazor; Attendance: 30,000; Referee: Jiménez Moreno

14 March 1984	Real Madrid	3–0	Deportivo de La Coruña	Madrid
20:30 CET	Santillana 24'; Pineda 39'; Isidro 67'	Report (in Spanish)		Stadium: Santiago Bernabéu; Referee: Borrás Del Barrio

==== Semi-finals ====
4 April 1984	Real Madrid	0–1	Athletic Bilbao	Madrid
21:00 CET		Report (in Spanish)	Urtubi 24' (pen.)	Stadium: Santiago Bernabéu; Referee: Valdés Sánchez

18 April 1984	Athletic Bilbao	0–1 (a.e.t.) (4–3 p)	Real Madrid	Bilbao
20:15 CET		Report (in Spanish)	Pineda 44'	Stadium: San Mamés; Referee: Enríquez Negreira
	Penalties
	Urtubi (penalty scored); Dani (penalty scored); Argote (penalty missed); Sola (penalty scored); Núñez (penalty scored)		(penalty missed) Camacho; (penalty scored) Salguero; (penalty missed) Stielike; (penalty scored) Chendo; (penalty scored) Juanito

=== Copa de la Liga ===
==== First round ====
6 May 1984	Real Madrid	1–1	Atlético Madrid	Madrid
	Butragueño 32'; Pineda (red card) 42'; Bonet (red card) 79'	Report	Balbino (yellow card) 35' (yellow-red card); Marina (red card) 71'; Arteche (red card) 79'; Hugo Sánchez 91'	Stadium: Santiago Bernabéu; Referee: Urizar Azpitarte

12 May 1984	Atlético Madrid	3–2	Real Madrid	Madrid
	Ruiz 45'; Quique Ramos 75'; Quique Ramos 89'; Hugo Sánchez (yellow card)	Report	Butragueño 42'; Ito 48'	Stadium: Estadio Vicente Calderón

=== UEFA Cup ===
==== First round ====
14 September 1983	Sparta Prague (Czechoslovakia)	3–2	(Spain) Real Madrid	Prague
17:00	Chovanec 27'; Procházka 53'; Griga 78'	Report	Santillana 40'; Juanito 60'	Stadium: Stadion Letná; Attendance: 40,000; Referee: (France) Alain Delmer

28 September 1983	Real Madrid (Spain)	1–1	(Czechoslovakia) Sparta Prague	Madrid
21:00	Isidro 23'	Report	Skuhravý 74'	Stadium: Santiago Bernabéu; Attendance: 58,800; Referee: (Belgium) Alexis Ponnet

== Statistics ==
=== Players statistics ===
No.	Pos	Nat	Player	Total		Primera División		Copa del Rey		Copa de la Liga		UEFA Cup	
No.	Pos	Nat	Player	Apps	Goals	Apps	Goals	Apps	Goals	Apps	Goals	Apps	Goals
	GK	(Spain) ESP	Miguel Ángel	41	-33	28	-24	11	-5	2	-4	0	0
	DF	(Spain) ESP	Chendo	26	0	20+1	0	5	0	0	0	0	0
	DF	(Spain) ESP	San José	39	1	25+3	0	8	1	1	0	2	0
	DF	(Spain) ESP	Sanchís	20	3	16+2	3	0	0	2	0	0	0
	DF	(Spain) ESP	Camacho	40	2	30	1	8	1	0	0	2	0
	MF	(Spain) ESP	Vázquez	20	1	16+3	1	0	0	0+1	0	0	0
	MF	(West Germany) FRG	Stielike	32	4	23	3	6	1	2	0	1	0
	MF	(Spain) ESP	Gallego	35	4	25	4	8+1	0	0	0	1	0
	MF	(Spain) ESP	Ángel	45	4	26+6	2	7+2	2	2	0	1+1	0
	FW	(Spain) ESP	Santillana	41	17	29+2	13	8	3	0	0	2	1
	FW	(Spain) ESP	Juanito	40	21	30+1	17	7	3	0	0	2	1
	GK	(Spain) ESP	Agustín	5	-9	3	-6	1	-2	0	0	1	-1
	DF	(Netherlands) NED	Metgod	29	2	16+1	1	9	1	2	0	1	0
	DF	(Spain) ESP	Bonet	26	0	14+3	0	8	0	1	0	0	0
	MF	(Spain) ESP	Bernardo	31	2	12+10	1	7+1	1	0	0	1	0
	DF	(Spain) ESP	Juan José	26	0	12+3	0	7	0	2	0	2	0
	FW	(Spain) ESP	Isidro	24	2	10+3	0	8+1	1	0	0	1+1	1
	MF	(Spain) ESP	Lozano	14	4	10	4	2	0	0	0	2	0
	FW	(Spain) ESP	Butragueño	12	6	8+2	4	0	0	2	2	0	0
	FW	(Spain) ESP	Pineda	27	12	6+9	4	8+2	8	1	0	0+1	0
	DF	(Spain) ESP	Salguero	14	1	5+3	1	2+3	0	0	0	1	0
	DF	(Spain) ESP	Fraile	11	0	3	0	1+5	0	0+1	0	1	0
	GK	(Spain) ESP	Remón	4	-10	3	-7	0	0	0	0	1	-3
	MF	(Spain) ESP	Del Bosque	10	0	1+4	0	4+1	0	0	0	0	0
	FW	(Spain) ESP	Pardeza	5	0	1+2	0	0	0	2	0	0	0
	FW	(Spain) ESP	Suarez	7	1	1+2	0	3+1	1	0	0	0	0
	FW	(Spain) ESP	Ito	9	1	1+2	0	2+3	0	1	1	0	0
	FW	(Spain) ESP	Cholo	4	0	0	0	2+2	0				
	FW	(Spain) ESP	Gonzalez	2	0	0	0	0	0	2	0		

- Source: http://www.bdfutbol.com/en/t/t1983-842.html

== See also ==
- La Quinta del Buitre
