= 1983 Copa del Rey final =

Copa del Rey 1983 final
- Event: 1982–83 Copa del Rey
| Barcelona | Real Madrid |
| 2 | 1 |
- Date: 4 June 1983
- Venue: La Romareda, Zaragoza
- Referee: José Luis García Carrión
- Attendance: 35,000

The 1983 Copa del Rey final was the 81st final of the Copa del Rey. The final was played at La Romareda in Zaragoza, on 4 June 1983, being won by Barcelona, who beat Real Madrid 2–1.

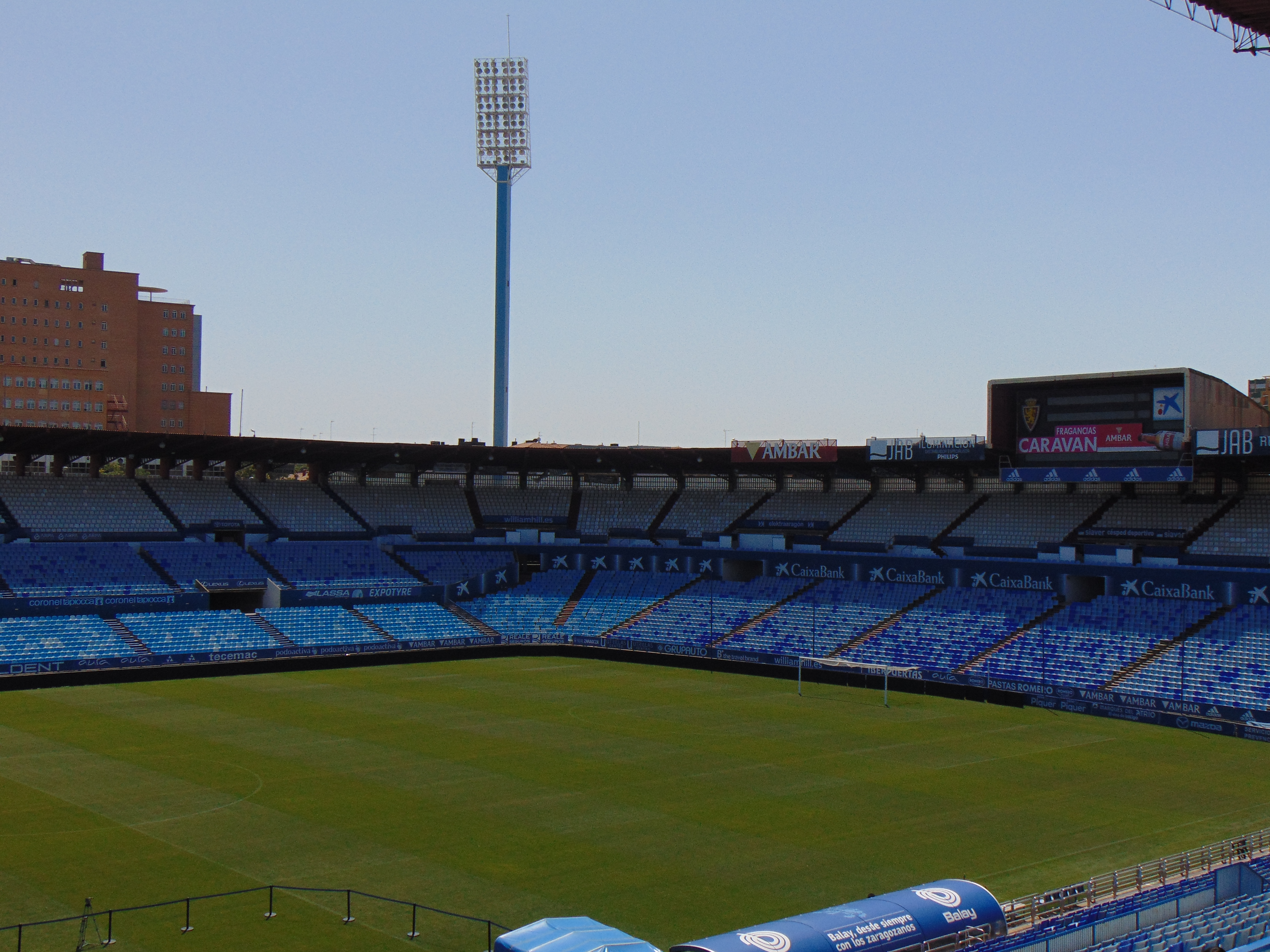
La Romareda Stadium in Zaragoza, venue of the final

== Match details ==
4 June 1983
22:15 CET

| Barcelona | 2–1 | Real Madrid |
|---|---|---|
| Víctor 32'; Marcos 90' | Report | Santillana 50' |

La Romareda, Zaragoza
Attendance: 35,000
Referee: José Luis García Carrión

Barcelona
Real Madrid

| GK | 1 | (Spain) Urruti |
| DF | 2 | (Spain) Tente Sánchez (c) |
| DF | 3 | (Spain) Migueli | (yellow card) 5' |
| DF | 6 | (Spain) Gerardo |
| DF | 4 | (Spain) Julio Alberto |
| MF | 9 | (Spain) Esteban | (yellow card) 58' | (substituted off) 81' |
| MF | 5 | (Spain) Víctor |
| MF | 8 | (West Germany) Bernd Schuster |
| MF | 11 | (Spain) Marcos Alonso |
| FW | 10 | (Argentina) Diego Maradona |
| FW | 7 | (Spain) Francisco Carrasco |
Substitutes:
| DF | 12 | (Spain) Antonio Olmo |
| GK | 13 | (Spain) Pedro María Artola |
| MF | 14 | (Spain) Enrique Morán | | (substituted on) 81' |
| FW | 15 | (Spain) Quini |
Manager:
(Argentina) César Luis Menotti

| GK | 1 | (Spain) Miguel Ángel |
| DF | 2 | (Spain) Isidoro San José |
| DF | 4 | (Netherlands) John Metgod |
| DF | 5 | (Spain) Francisco Bonet |
| DF | 3 | (Spain) José Antonio Camacho | (yellow card) 34' |
| MF | 8 | (Spain) Ángel |
| MF | 10 | (West Germany) Uli Stielike |
| MF | 6 | (Spain) Ricardo Gallego |
| MF | 7 | (Spain) José Antonio Salguero |
| FW | 11 | (Spain) Juanito | | (substituted off) 75' |
| FW | 9 | (Spain) Santillana (c) |
Substitutes:
| DF | 12 | (Spain) Juan José |
| GK | 13 | (Spain) Mariano García Remón |
| FW | 14 | (Spain) Francisco Pineda |
| MF | 15 | (Spain) Isidro | | (substituted on) 75' |
Manager:
(Argentina) Alfredo Di Stéfano

Match rules

- 90 minutes
- 30 minutes of extra-time if necessary
- Penalty shoot-out if scores still level
- Four named substitutes
- Maximum of two substitutions

== See also ==
- El Clásico
