= 1985–86 Real Madrid CF season =

84th season in existence of Real Madrid CF

Real Madrid CF
1985–86 season
- Chairman: Ramón Mendoza
- Manager: Luis Molowny
- Stadium: Santiago Bernabéu
- La Liga: 1st (in 1986–87 European Cup)
- Copa del Rey: Semi-finals
- Copa de la Liga: Second round
- UEFA Cup: Winners
- Top goalscorer: League: Hugo Sánchez (22); All: Hugo Sánchez (29)
Home colours	Away colours

The 1985–86 season was Real Madrid Club de Fútbol's 84th season in existence and the club's 55th consecutive season in the top flight of Spanish football.

== Season ==
During summer new president Ramon Mendoza appointed Luis Molowny as the club manager for the season after a failed bid on Athletic Bilbao coach Javier Clemente who clinched the league trophies in the 1982–83 and 1983–84 seasons and rejected the offer due to his contract expires in June 1986. Surprisingly, Clemente left the Lions midway through the 1985–86 season, after a run-in with star player Manuel Sarabia, but, by that time, club president Mendoza signed an agreement for the upcoming season with Dutch coach Leo Beenhakker. After six years without winning La Liga, Real Madrid Club de Fútbol finally won the title in the 1985–86 season. The team also triumphed in the UEFA Cup, making it a European Double. Following a change in the chairman office (from Luis de Carlos to Ramón Mendoza), Real Madrid signed new top players (such as Hugo Sánchez, Rafael Gordillo and Antonio Maceda) under manager Luis Molowny, and produced an emphatic season. This was the club's 21st league title in history and its second consecutive UEFA Cup. Real Madrid defeated 1. FC Köln in the final to win the 1985–86 UEFA Cup. The club were eliminated from the Copa del Rey by Real Zaragoza in the semi-finals.

== Squad ==
Note: Flags indicate national team as defined under FIFA eligibility rules; some limited exceptions apply. Players may hold more than one non-FIFA nationality.

No.	Pos.	Nation	Player
-	GK	ESP	Otxotorena
-	GK	ESP	Agustín Rodríguez
-	GK	ESP	Mariano García Remón
-	GK	ESP	Miguel Angel
-	DF	ESP	Chendo
-	DF	ESP	José Antonio Camacho
-	DF	ESP	Manuel Sanchís
-	DF	ESP	Antonio Maceda
-	DF	ESP	José Antonio Salguero
-	DF	ESP	Isidoro San José
-	DF	ESP	Jesús Ángel Solana
-	DF	ESP	Francis Rodríguez

No.	Pos.	Nation	Player
-	MF	ESP	Rafael Martín Vázquez
-	MF	ESP	Ricardo Gallego
-	MF	ESP	Míchel
-	MF	ESP	Rafael Gordillo
-	MF	ESP	Martin Gonzalez
-	FW	MEX	Hugo Sánchez
-	FW	ESP	Emilio Butragueño
-	FW	ARG	Jorge Valdano
-	FW	ESP	Santillana
-	FW	ESP	Juanito
-	FW	ESP	Cholo

=== Transfers ===
In
Pos.	Name	from	Type
FW	Hugo Sánchez	Atlético Madrid	
MF	Rafael Gordillo	Real Betis	
DF	Antonio Maceda	Sporting Gijón	
FW	Cholo	Real Zaragoza	
DF	Francis Rodriguez	Real Valladolid	loan ended

Out
Pos.	Name	To	Type
MF	Uli Stielike	Neuchâtel Xamax FCS	
FW	Miguel Pardeza	Real Zaragoza	(loan)
DF	Alfonso Fraile	Real Zaragoza	
DF	Isidro	Racing Santander	
DF	Juan José	Cádiz CF	
MF	Lozano	RSC Anderlecht	
FW	Marquez	Cartagena FC	
FW	Francisco Pineda	Real Zaragoza	
FW	Leonardo	Castilla CF	
DF	Paco Bonet	Castilla CF	
DF	Clemente	Castilla CF	

== Friendlies ==
=== Teresa Herrera Trophy ===
9 August 1985 Semi-finals	Atlético Madrid	2–0	Real Madrid	La Coruña
	Quique Setien 59'; Minguez 87'			Stadium: Riazor

11 August 1985 Third place match	Fluminese	2–0	Real Madrid	La Coruña
	Washington 11'; Assis 22'			Stadium: Riazor

=== Santiago Bernabeu Trophy ===
29 August 1985	Real Madrid	4–2	Bayern Munich	Madrid
	Hugo Sanchez 47' (pen.); Butragueño 66'; Santillana 70'; Valdano 79'		14' Lerby; 38' Mathäus	Stadium: Santiago Bernabéu

== Competitions ==
=== La Liga ===
==== Position by round ====
Round	1	2	3	4	5	6	7	8	9	10	11	12	13	14	15	16	17	18	19	20	21	22	23	24	25	26	27	28	29	30	31	32	33	34
Ground	A	H	A	H	A	H	A	H	A	H	A	H	A	H	A	H	A	H	A	H	A	H	A	H	A	H	A	H	A	H	A	H	H	A
Result	D	W	W	W	D	W	W	W	D	W	L	W	L	W	W	W	W	W	W	W	D	W	W	W	W	W	W	W	W	W	L	W	W	L
Position	7	1	1	1	2	1	1	1	1	1	1	1	1	1	1	1	1	1	1	1	1	1	1	1	1	1	1	1	1	1	1	1	1	1

Source: BDFutbol
A = Away; H = Home; W = Win; D = Draw; L = Loss; = Leader, 1986–87 European Cup; = 1986–87 UEFA Cup; = 1986–87 Segunda División

==== League table ====
Pos	Team	Pld	W	D	L	GF	GA	GD	Pts	Qualification or relegation
1	Real Madrid (C)	34	26	4	4	83	33	+50	56	Qualification for the European Cup first round
2	Barcelona	34	18	9	7	61	36	+25	45	Qualification for the UEFA Cup first round
3	Athletic Bilbao	34	17	9	8	44	31	+13	43	Qualification for the UEFA Cup first round
4	Zaragoza	34	15	12	7	51	34	+17	42	Qualification for the Cup Winners' Cup first round (Note: Zaragoza qualified for the European Cup Winners' Cup as champions of the Copa del Rey.)
5	Atlético Madrid	34	17	8	9	53	38	+15	42	Qualification for the UEFA Cup first round

Source: BDFútbol
Rules for classification: 1) Points; 2) Head-to-head results; 3) Goal difference; 4) Number of goals scored
(C) Champions

==== Matches ====
31 August 1985 1	Real Betis	2–2	Real Madrid	Sevilla
	Gabriel Calderón 62'; Rincón 80'; Ortega (yellow card) 60' (yellow-red card); Alex (yellow card); Quico (yellow card)	Report	Hugo Sánchez 71' (pen.); Jorge Valdano 88'; Hugo Sánchez (red card) 80'; Camacho (yellow card); Chendo (yellow card); Sanchís (yellow card)	Stadium: Estadio Benito Villamarin; Referee: Ildefonso Urizar Azpitarte

3 September 1985 2	Real Madrid	5–0	Valencia CF	Madrid
	Míchel 29', 69', 81'; Butragueño 52'; Santillana 74'	Report		Stadium: Estadio Santiago Bernabéu; Referee: José Merino González

7 September 1985 3	RCD Español	1–2	Real Madrid	Barcelona
	Zúñiga 10'	Report	Butragueño 17'; Hugo Sánchez 77'	Stadium: Estadio Sarria

14 September 1985 4	Real Madrid	1–0	Racing Santander	Madrid
	Hugo Sánchez 33'	Report		Stadium: Estadio Santiago Bernabéu; Referee: Ángel Calvo Córdova

28 September 1985 5	Real Zaragoza	1–1	Real Madrid	Zaragoza
	Señor 3'	Report	Gallego 19'	Stadium: Estadio La Romareda

6 October 1985 6	Real Madrid	2–1	Atlético Madrid	Madrid
	Valdano 9'; Santillana 83'	Report	Ruiz 15'	Stadium: Estadio Santiago Bernabéu; Referee: Joaquin Ramos Marcos

13 October 1985 7	CA Osasuna	0–1	Real Madrid	Pamplona
		Report	Hugo Sánchez 53'	Stadium: Estadio El Sadar; Referee: Victoriano Sánchez Arminio

20 October 1985 8	Real Madrid	2–0	Athletic Bilbao	Madrid
	Hugo Sánchez 43'; Hugo Sánchez 72'	Report		Stadium: Estadio Santiago Bernabéu; Referee: Enríquez Negreira

27 October 1985 9	Sevilla FC	2–2	Real Madrid	Sevilla
	Amaro Nadal 48'; Estella 58'	Report	Valdano 74'; Valdano 88'	Stadium: Estadio Sanchez Pizjuan; Referee: Garcia De Loza

1 November 1985 10	Real Madrid	4–0	Hércules CF	Madrid
	Míchel 40'; Sanchís 51'; Maceda 59'; Juanito 89'	Report		Stadium: Estadio Santiago Bernabéu; Referee: Juan Andújar Oliver

8 November 1985 11	FC Barcelona	2–0	Real Madrid	Barcelona
	Marcos Alonso 2'; Calderé 72'	Report		Stadium: Camp Nou; Referee: Joaquín Urío Velázquez

16 November 1985 12	Real Madrid	3–1	Cádiz CF	Madrid
	Valdano 21'; Valdano 28'; Valdano 66'	Report	Amarillo 37'	Stadium: Estadio Santiago Bernabéu; Referee: Miguel Marín López

23 November 1985 13	Real Valladolid	3–2	Real Madrid	Valladolid
	Gail 8' (pen.); Torrecilla 13'; Gail 46' (pen.)	Report	Hugo Sánchez 42' (pen.); Valdano 70'	Stadium: Estadio Jose Zorrilla; Referee: Ildefonso Urizar Azpitarte

30 November 1985 14	Real Madrid	5–1	UD Las Palmas	Madrid
	Hugo Sánchez 14'; Hugo Sánchez 26'; Míchel 37'; Butragueño 47'; Gordillo 53'	Report	Juani 16'	Stadium: Estadio Santiago Bernabéu; Referee: Manuel Álvarez Margüenda

6 December 1985 15	Real Madrid	4–0	Celta Vigo	Madrid
	Juanito 37'; Santillana 70'; Hugo Sánchez 72'; Hugo Sánchez 75'	Report		Stadium: Estadio Santiago Bernabéu; Referee: Eusebio Álvarez Díaz

14 December 1985 16	Sporting Gijón	0–2	Real Madrid	Gijón
		Report	Butragueño 27'; Hugo Sánchez 65'	Stadium: Estadio El Molinon; Referee: Teodoro Valdés Sánchez

21 December 1985 17	Real Madrid	1–0	Real Sociedad	Madrid
	Hugo Sánchez 77' (pen.)	Report		Stadium: Estadio Santiago Bernabéu; Referee: José Pérez Sánchez

28 December 1985 18	Real Madrid	4–1	Real Betis	Madrid
	Míchel 47'; Maceda 55'; Valdano 82'; Santillana 86'	Report	Gabriel Calderón 42'	Stadium: Estadio Santiago Bernabéu; Referee: José Miguel Pérez

4 January 1986 19	Valencia CF	0–3	Real Madrid	Valencia
		Report	Martín Vázquez 48'; Hugo Sánchez 69'; Tendillo 89' (own goal)	Stadium: Estadio Luis Casanova; Referee: Juan Andújar Oliver

11 January 1986 20	Real Madrid	4–1	RCD Español	Madrid
	Maceda 8'; Valdano 36'; Hugo Sánchez 62'; Maceda 69'	Report	Tintín Márquez 1'	Stadium: Estadio Santiago Bernabéu; Referee: Ildefonso Urizar Azpitarte

18 January 1986 21	Racing Santander	1–1	Real Madrid	Santander
	Víctor Diego 48'	Report	Butragueño 73'	Stadium: Estadio El Sardinero; Referee: José Pes Pérez

25 January 1986 22	Real Madrid	1–0	Real Zaragoza	Madrid
	Valdano 22'	Report		Stadium: Estadio Santiago Bernabéu; Referee: José Socorro González

1 February 1986 23	Atlético Madrid	0–1	Real Madrid	Madrid
		Report	Ruiz 15' (own goal)	Stadium: Estadio Vicente Calderón; Referee: Joaquin Ramos Marcos

8 February 1986 24	Real Madrid	2–0	CA Osasuna	Madrid
	Butragueño 32'; Gallego 63'	Report		Stadium: Estadio Santiago Bernabéu; Referee: Manuel Álvarez Margüenda

15 February 1986 25	Athletic Bilbao	1–2	Real Madrid	Bilbao
	Goikoetxea 24'	Report	Patxi Salinas 8' (own goal); Valdano 30'	Stadium: Estadio San Mames; Referee: José Miguel Pérez

22 February 1986 26	Real Madrid	2–1	Sevilla FC	Madrid
	Butragueño 5'; Butragueño 86'	Report	Álvarez 25'	Stadium: Estadio Santiago Bernabéu; Referee: Victoriano Sánchez Arminio

1 March 1986 27	Hércules CF	0–3	Real Madrid	Alicante
		Report	Hugo Sánchez 25'; Valdano 51'; Valdano 55'	Referee: Felipe Crespo Aurre

7 March 1986 28	Real Madrid	3–1	FC Barcelona	Madrid
	Maceda 64'; Valdano 67'; Butragueño 83'; Juanito (yellow card)	Report	Amarilla 51'; Archibald (yellow card) 70' (yellow-red card); Alexanko (yellow card); Víctor Muñoz (yellow card); Calderé (yellow card)	Stadium: Estadio Santiago Bernabéu

15 March 1986 29	Cádiz CF	1–3	Real Madrid	Cádiz
	Villa 45'	Report	Salguero 44'; Martín Vázquez 60'; Hugo Sánchez 66'

22 March 1986 30	Real Madrid	2–1	Real Valladolid	Madrid
	Míchel 50'; Valdano 84'	Report	Jorge Alonso 67'	Stadium: Estadio Santiago Bernabéu

28 March 1986 31	UD Las Palmas	4–3	Real Madrid	Las Palmas
	Narciso 52'; Jorge Contreras 82'; Augusto Santís 84'; Jorge Contreras 87' (pen.)	Report	Cholo 64'; Cholo 70'; Butragueño 77' (pen.)

5 April 1986 32	Celta Vigo	1–5	Real Madrid	Vigo
	Alvelo 42'	Report	Vicente Álvarez 7' (own goal); Hugo Sánchez 17'; Hugo Sánchez 22'; Cholo 39'; Juanito 74'	Stadium: Estadio Balaídos

11 April 1986 33	Real Madrid	2–1	Sporting Gijón	Madrid
	Martín Vázquez 3'; Hugo Sánchez 49'	Report	Eloy 21'	Stadium: Estadio Santiago Bernabéu

19 April 1986 34	Real Sociedad	5–3	Real Madrid	San Sebastián
	Bakero 7'; Bakero 49'; Salguero 59' (own goal); Mujíca 70'; Uralde 76'	Report	Hugo Sánchez 6'; Hugo Sánchez 19'; Juanito 78'	Stadium: Estadio Anoeta

=== Copa del Rey ===
==== Round of 16 ====
15 January 1986	Real Madrid	5–0	Recreativo Huelva	Madrid
20:30 CET	Martín Vázquez 12'; Sanchís 18'; Santillana 33', 41'; Sánchez 56' (pen.)	Report (in Spanish)		Stadium: Santiago Bernabéu; Attendance: 20,000; Referee: Pérez Sánchez

5 February 1986	Recreativo Huelva	3–1	Real Madrid	Huelva
20:45 CET	Cepeda 5' (pen.); Ramón 45'; Alzugaray 89'	Report (in Spanish)	Butragueño 51'	Stadium: Colombino; Referee: Franco Martínez

==== Quarter-finals ====
12 February 1986	Celta Vigo	0–0	Real Madrid	Vigo
20:30 CET		Report (in Spanish)		Stadium: Balaídos; Attendance: 20,000; Referee: Calvo Córdova

26 February 1986	Real Madrid	4–0	Celta Vigo	Madrid
20:30 CET	Butragueño 20'; Santillana 49', 58', 90'	Report (in Spanish)		Stadium: Santiago Bernabéu; Attendance: 30,000; Referee: Martín Navarrete

==== Semi-finals ====
12 March 1986	Zaragoza	2–0	Real Madrid	Zaragoza
21:00 CET	Sosa 13', 26'	Report (in Spanish)		Stadium: La Romareda; Referee: Marín López

9 April 1986	Real Madrid	3–2 (3–4 agg.)	Zaragoza	Madrid
21:00 CET	Valdano 11'; Sanchís 85'; Sánchez 89'	Report (in Spanish)	Pineda 54'; Señor 69'	Stadium: Santiago Bernabéu; Referee: Andújar Oliver

=== UEFA Cup ===
==== First round ====
18 September 1985	AEK Athens (Greece)	1–0	(Spain) Real Madrid	Athens
	Papaioannou 10'	Report		Stadium: Athens Olympic Stadium; Attendance: 39,819; Referee: (Romania) Ioan Igna

2 October 1985	Real Madrid (Spain)	5–0	(Greece) AEK Athens	Madrid
	Georgamlis 8' (o.g.); Butragueño 18'; Míchel 20'; Valdano 32'; Sánchez 59'	Report		Stadium: Estadio Santiago Bernabéu; Attendance: 85,000; Referee: (France) Alain Delmer

==== Second round ====
23 October 1985	Real Madrid (Spain)	2–1	(Soviet Union) FC Chornomorets Odessa	Madrid
21:00	Gordillo 1'; Valdano 71'	Report	Bagapov 7'	Stadium: Estadio Santiago Bernabéu; Attendance: 75,000; Referee: (England) Keith Hackett

6 November 1985	FC Chornomorets Odessa (Soviet Union)	0–0	(Spain) Real Madrid	Odessa
15:00		Report		Stadium: ChMP Central Stadium; Attendance: 41,500; Referee: (Sweden) Ulf Eriksson

==== Third round ====
27 November 1985	Borussia Mönchengladbach (West Germany)	5–1	(Spain) Real Madrid	Düsseldorf
	Mill 29'; Salguero 40' (o.g.); Rahn 55', 59'; Lienen 81'	Report	Gordillo 68'	Stadium: Rheinstadion; Referee: (Italy) Luigi Agnolin

11 December 1985	Real Madrid (Spain)	4–0 (5a-5 agg.)	(West Germany) Borussia Mönchengladbach	Madrid
	Valdano 5', 17'; Santillana 76', 88'	Report		Stadium: Estadio Santiago Bernabéu; Referee: (Scotland) Brian McGinlay

==== Quarter-finals ====
5 March 1986	Real Madrid (Spain)	3–0	(Switzerland) Neuchâtel Xamax	Madrid
	Sánchez 32'; Míchel 74'; Butragueño 85'	Report		Stadium: Estadio Santiago Bernabéu; Referee: (Socialist Federal Republic of Yugoslavia) Zoran Petrović

19 March 1986	Neuchâtel Xamax (Switzerland)	2–0 (2–3 agg.)	(Spain) Real Madrid	Neuchâtel
	Stielike 11'; Jacobacci 90'	Report		Stadium: La Maladière, Referee: (East Germany) Karl-Heinz Tritschler

==== Semi-finals ====
2 April 1986	Internazionale (Italy)	3–1	(Spain) Real Madrid	Milan
	Tardelli 1' 54'; Salguero 89' (o.g.)	Report	Valdano 87'	Stadium: San Siro; Attendance: 85,000; Referee: (Sweden) Erik Fredriksson

16 April 1986	Real Madrid (Spain)	5–1 (a.e.t)	(Italy) Internazionale	Madrid
	Hugo Sánchez 43' (pen.) 74' (pen.); Gordillo 64'; Santillana 93' 108'	Report	Brady 66' (pen.)	Stadium: Santiago Bernabéu Stadium; Attendance: 85,000; Referee: (Netherlands) Jan Keizer

==== Final ====
30 April 1986	Real Madrid (Spain)	5–1	(West Germany) 1. FC Köln	Madrid
	Sánchez 38'; Gordillo 42'; Valdano 51' 84'; Santillana 89'	Report	Allofs 29'	Stadium: Santiago Bernabéu Stadium; Attendance: 85,000; Referee: (England) George Courtney

6 May 1986	1. FC Köln (West Germany)	2–0 (3–5 agg.)	(Spain) Real Madrid	West Berlin
	Bein 22'; Geilenkirchen 72'	Report		Stadium: Olympiastadion; Attendance: 21,185; Referee: (Scotland) Bob Valentine

== Statistics ==
=== Squad statistics ===
competition	points	total						GD
competition	points	G	V	N	P	Gf	Gs	GD
La Liga	56	34	26	4	4	83	33	+50
Copa del Rey	–	6	4	1	1	14	6	+8
Copa de la liga	–	2	0	1	1	2	6	–4
UEFA Cup	–	12	6	1	5	26	16	+10
Total		54	36	7	11	115	61	+54

=== Players statistics ===
No.	Pos	Nat	Player	Total		La Liga		Copa del Rey		UEFA		Copa de la Liga	
No.	Pos	Nat	Player	Apps	Goals	Apps	Goals	Apps	Goals	Apps	Goals	Apps	Goals
	GK	(Spain) ESP	Otxotorena	36	-40	23	-23	4	-5	8+1	-12		
	DF	(Spain) ESP	Chendo	45	3	30	3	5	0	10	0		
	DF	(Spain) ESP	Maceda	39	5	26+2	5	3	0	8	0		
	DF	(Spain) ESP	Sanchis	42	3	29	1	6	2	7	0		
	DF	(Spain) ESP	Camacho	45	3	29	3	4	0	12	0		
	MF	(Spain) ESP	Míchel	48	9	30+1	7	5	0	12	2		
	MF	(Spain) ESP	Gallego	48	2	31	2	6	0	11	0		
	MF	(Spain) ESP	Gordillo	33	5	22	1	1+1	0	9	4		
	FW	(Spain) ESP	Butragueño	49	14	28+3	10	5+1	2	11+1	2		
	FW	(Mexico) MEX	Sanchez	49	29	33	22	5	2	11	5		
	FW	(Argentina) ARG	Valdano	47	24	27+5	16	2+2	1	10+1	7		
	GK	(Spain) ESP	Agustin	20	-22	11+1	-10	2	-2	4	-4	2	-6
	FW	(Spain) ESP	Juanito	43	4	22+6	4	2+2	0	6+3	0	2	0
	DF	(Spain) ESP	Francis Rodríguez	12	0	12	0						
	MF	(Spain) ESP	Salguero	28	1	11+3	1	4+1	0	5+2	0	2	0
	MF	(Spain) ESP	Martín Vázquez	30	4	10+7	3	4	1	3+4	0	2	0
	FW	(Spain) ESP	Santillana	44	14	6+21	4	4+2	5	2+7	5	2	0
	FW	(Spain) ESP	Cholo	15	4	4+4	3	2+1	0	0+2	0	2	1
	DF	(Spain) ESP	Solana	8	2	4	2	0	0	2	0	2	0
	DF	(Spain) ESP	San Jose	9	0	1+5	0	0	0	1	0	2	0
	DF	(Spain) ESP	Francis	3	0	0	0	1	0	0	0	2	0
	MF	(Spain) ESP	Martin Gonzalez	1	0	0	0	1	0				
	DF	(Spain) ESP	Bonet	2	0	0	0	0	0	0	0	2	0
	MF	(Spain) ESP	Martos	1	0	0	0	0	0	0	0	0+1	0
	FW	(Spain) ESP	Pardeza	2	1	0	0	0	0	0	0	2	1
	DF	(Spain) ESP	Leon	1	0	0	0	0	0	0	0	0+1	0
	GK	(Spain) ESP	Remón	0	0	0	0	0	0	0	0	0	0
	GK	(Spain) ESP	Miguel Angel	0	0	0	0	0	0	0	0	0	0

- Source: https://www.bdfutbol.com/en/t/t1985-862.html

== See also ==
La Quinta del Buitre
