= 1983 Copa de la Liga =

Copa de la Liga
Tournament details
- Country: Spain
- Teams: 18

Final positions
- Champions: Barcelona
- Runners-up: Real Madrid

Tournament statistics
- Matches played: 34
- Goals scored: 108 (3.18 per match)
- Top goal scorer: (Paraguay) Raúl Amarilla (7)

The 1983 Copa de la Liga was the first edition of Copa de la Liga. The competition started on May 8, 1983, and concluded on June 29, 1983. Due to time constraints, saturation and club pressure, the Copa de la Liga only lasted four years since 1982, being cancelled in 1986.

== Format ==
The Copa de la Liga was played by 18 teams of 1982–83 La Liga. All rounds are played over two legs. The team that has the higher aggregate score over the two legs progresses to the next round. The 1982–83 Copa del Rey semifinal losers are exempt until second round, and the 1982–83 Copa del Rey final teams are exempt until quarterfinals.

- Athletic Bilbao
- Atlético Madrid
- FC Barcelona
- Real Betis
- Celta de Vigo
- RCD Español
- UD Las Palmas
- Málaga CF
- CA Osasuna
- Racing Santander
- Real Madrid
- Real Zaragoza
- Real Sociedad
- Real Valladolid
- UD Salamanca
- Sevilla CF
- Sporting Gijón
- Valencia CF

== First round ==
First leg: 8 May 1983. Second leg: 21 and 22 May 1983.

Team 1	Agg.	Team 2	1st leg	2nd leg
Celta de Vigo	4–9	RCD Español	3–2	1–7
Real Betis	2–2 (p)	Málaga CF	1–0	1–2
Racing Santander	4–3	Valencia CF	1–0	3–3
UD Salamanca	1–4	Atlético Madrid	0–0	1–4
Real Zaragoza	4–1	Sevilla FC	2–1	2–0
Athletic Bilbao	(p) 2–2	CA Osasuna	1–1	1–1
UD Las Palmas	6–2	Real Valladolid	4–1	2–1

== Second round ==
First leg: June 1, 1983. Second leg: June 8, 1983.

Team 1	Agg.	Team 2	1st leg	2nd leg
Atlético Madrid	3–2	Athletic Bilbao	3–0	0–2
Sporting Gijón	3–2	Málaga CF	2–2	1–0
Racing Santander	3–6	Real Zaragoza	3–2	0–4
Real Sociedad	(p) 2–2	RCD Español	2–2	0–0

- Bye: UD Las Palmas.

== Quarter-finals ==
First leg: June 12, 1983. Second leg: June 15, 1983.

Team 1	Agg.	Team 2	1st leg	2nd leg
Real Madrid	2–1	Real Sociedad	1–0	1–1
FC Barcelona	1–0	Sporting Gijón	1–0	0–0
UD Las Palmas	1–3	Atlético Madrid	1–0	0–3

- Bye: Real Zaragoza.

== Semi-finals ==
First leg: June 19, 1983. Second leg: June 22, 1983.

Team 1	Agg.	Team 2	1st leg	2nd leg
Real Zaragoza	8–8 (p)	Real Madrid	5–3	3–5
Atlético Madrid	3–5	FC Barcelona	1–0	2–5

== Final ==
=== First leg ===
1983 Copa de la Liga Final
26 June 1983
First leg

Real Madrid	2–2	Barcelona
Del Bosque 63'; Juanito 69'		Carrasco 50'; Maradona 57'

Santiago Bernabéu, Madrid
Referee: Ildefonso Urizar Azpitarte

=== Second leg ===
29 June 1983
Second leg

Barcelona	2–1	Real Madrid
Maradona 19' (pen.); Alexanko 20'	Report	Santillana 84'

Camp Nou, Barcelona
Referee: Joaquín Ramos Marcos

Barcelona
Real Madrid

GK	1	(Spain) Urruti
DF	2	(Spain) Tente Sánchez (c)
DF	3	(Spain) Migueli
DF	6	(Spain) Alexanko
DF	4	(Spain) Julio Alberto
MF	5	(Spain) Víctor Muñoz
MF	8	(Germany) Bernd Schuster
MF	9	(Spain) Periko Alonso
FW	11	(Spain) Marcos	(substituted off) 76'
FW	10	(Argentina) Diego Maradona
FW	7	(Spain) Carrasco
Substitutes:
MF		Esteban Vigo	(substituted on) 76'
Manager:
(Argentina) César Luis Menotti

GK	(Spain) Agustín
DF	(Spain) Juan José
DF	(Spain) Isidro Díaz
DF	(Netherlands) John Metgod
DF	(Spain) José A. Salguero	(substituted off) 16'
MF	(Spain) Ricardo Gallego
MF	(Spain) Vicente del Bosque
MF	(Spain) Ángel de los Santos
FW	(Spain) Francisco García
FW	(Spain) Miguel Ángel Portugal
FW	(Spain) Ito	(substituted off) 73'
Substitutes:
DF	(Spain) Isidoro San José	(substituted on) 16'
FW	(Spain) Santillana	(substituted on) 73'
Manager:
(Argentina) Alfredo Di Stéfano

1983 Copa de la Liga
(Spain)
Barcelona
1st title
