= Juanito (footballer, born 1954) =

Spanish footballer (1954–1992)

- Juanito in 1981

Personal information
- Full name: Juan Gómez González
- Date of birth: 10 November 1954
- Place of birth: Fuengirola, Spain
- Date of death: 2 April 1992 (aged 37)
- Place of death: Calzada de Oropesa, Spain
- Height: 1.70 m (5 ft 7 in)
- Position: Forward

Youth career
- Fuengirola
- 1969–1972: Atlético Madrid

Senior career*
| Years | Team | Apps | (Gls) |
| 1972–1973 | Atlético Madrileño | | |
| 1973–1977 | Burgos | 104 | (25) |
| 1977–1987 | Real Madrid | 284 | (85) |
| 1987–1989 | Málaga | 71 | (15) |
| 1991 | Los Boliches | 5 | (0) |
| Total | | 464 | (125) |

International career
| 1970–1972 | Spain U18 | 9 | (0) |
| 1976 | Spain amateur | 2 | (0) |
| 1976–1982 | Spain | 34 | (8) |

Managerial career
- 1991–1992: Mérida
- * Club domestic league appearances and goals

Juan Gómez González (10 November 1954 – 2 April 1992), known as Juanito, was a Spanish footballer who played as a forward.

A player with tremendous dribbling ability whose career was overshadowed by a fierce character, he was best known for his Real Madrid years. He died in a road accident at the age of 37.

Growing up, he supported Real Zaragoza, but as he approached his adulthood he began supporting Real Madrid. Upon his presentation in 1977, he said: "Playing for Real Madrid is like touching the sky, Real Madrid has always been my first choice as a team and Madrid has always been my favorite as a city". Over 13 seasons, he amassed La Liga totals of 350 matches and 99 goals.

Juanito earned more than 30 caps for Spain, representing the nation in two World Cups and one European Championship.

== Club career ==
Born in Fuengirola, Province of Málaga, Juanito played as a youth with his local club before joining Atlético Madrid in 1969. While still underage, he allegedly forged his papers so he could play for their under-18 team. He scored twice on his debut, but a fractured tibia ended his career at Atlético and he never played for the senior side.

Juanito would revive his career at Burgos, helping them to win the Segunda División in 1975–76. He made his La Liga debut in a 2–1 win over Español in the following season, and was eventually awarded Spanish Footballer of the Year by Don Balón.

Juanito soon attracted the attention of Real Madrid, which signed the player in June 1977. He became a prominent member of the successful sides during the late 1970s and 1980s, in a squad which also featured Santillana, Uli Stielike, Vicente del Bosque and José Antonio Camacho. Having scored ten goals in his debut season he was instrumental in helping the capital team to five league titles, two Copa del Rey and two UEFA Cups – among his personal highlights were netting twice in the 1980 domestic cup final, incidentally played against Castilla, the club's reserves (6–1). On 11 May 1983 he scored through a penalty in the European Cup Winners' Cup final, a 2–1 loss against Aberdeen, and, in the subsequent league campaign, he won the Pichichi Trophy after finishing as joint top scorer with 17 goals; over ten seasons with the Merengues he played 284 top-flight games and scored 85 times, adding 55 appearances in various European competitions (17 goals).

After leaving Real Madrid, Juanito spent two seasons with Málaga, helping the side to promote from the second tier in his first year, as champions – as legendary László Kubala was the manager– and scoring one of his five goals of the following campaign against former teammate Francisco Buyo, before retiring in 1991 after a very brief spell with amateurs Los Boliches, also in his native Andalusia. He subsequently began a working as a coach with Mérida, leading the team to a seventh place in division two in 1991–92; however, on 2 April 1992, after watching Real play Torino in a UEFA Cup match, he was killed in a road accident in Calzada de Oropesa, Toledo, while returning to Mérida.

== International career ==
Juanito played 34 times for Spain, scoring eight goals. His debut came on 10 October 1976 in a 1978 FIFA World Cup qualifier against Yugoslavia, in Sevilla: at the 30-minute mark, he replaced teammate del Bosque in a 2–0 win; in the second match with this opponent, on 30 November 1977 in Belgrade (1–0 victory), he was hit with a bottle as he was being replaced and made an obscene gesture towards the crowd.

Juanito represented Spain at the 1978 and 1982 World Cups, and at UEFA Euro 1980. During the 1982 competition, on home soil, he netted a penalty against Yugoslavia in another win (2–1). In 1976, he played Olympic football.

== Profile ==
Juanito was considered by most of Real Madrid fans to represent the essence of what the club is about, his spirit often being called upon before matches where the team need to make an unexpected comeback (because of all the comebacks he often led while donning the white shirt). One of these was against Celtic in the quarter-finals of the 1979–80 European Cup, with Real losing 2–0 in the first match in Glasgow: in the second leg the team managed to come from behind after scoring three times without response (the third by him), thus reaching the last four; other comebacks in this period included the downings of Inter Milan and Anderlecht.

Since his death, Juanito continued to be remembered in the seventh minute of every home game, as the Ultras chanted "Illa illa illa, Juanito maravilla".

During his career, Juanito was involved in several violent incidents: in 1978, he received a two-year suspension from European competitions after assaulting referee Adolf Prokop in a match against Grasshoppers. In a UEFA Cup tie against another Swiss side, Neuchâtel Xamax, he spat on former teammate Stielike. He was again banned in 1987, this time for four years – an error in communications from UEFA meant that the sanction was originally thought to be five – after deliberately stamping on Bayern Munich's Lothar Matthäus' face; as an apology, he later gave the German a bullfighter's cape and rapier.

== Career statistics ==
=== Club ===
Appearances and goals by club, season and competition
| Club | Season | League | | | Cup | | League Cup | | Continental | | Other | | Total | |
| Club | Season | Division | Apps | Goals | Apps | Goals | Apps | Goals | Apps | Goals | Apps | Goals | Apps | Goals |
|---|---|---|---|---|---|---|---|---|---|---|---|---|---|---|
| Atlético Madrileño | 1971–72 | Tercera División | — | | 3 | 0 | — | | — | | — | | 3 | 0 |
| Atlético Madrileño | Total | | — | | 3 | 0 | — | | — | | — | | 3 | 0 |
| Burgos | 1973–74 | Segunda División | 26 | 3 | 1 | 0 | — | | — | | — | | 27 | 3 |
| Burgos | 1974–75 | Segunda División | 18 | 7 | 3 | 1 | — | | — | | — | | 21 | 8 |
| Burgos | 1975–76 | Segunda División | 28 | 6 | 4 | 1 | — | | — | | — | | 32 | 7 |
| Burgos | 1976–77 | La Liga | 32 | 9 | 4 | 0 | — | | — | | — | | 36 | 9 |
| Burgos | Total | | 104 | 25 | 12 | 2 | — | | — | | — | | 116 | 27 |
| Real Madrid | 1977–78 | La Liga | 32 | 10 | 4 | 4 | — | | — | | — | | 36 | 14 |
| Real Madrid | 1978–79 | La Liga | 29 | 6 | 7 | 0 | — | | 4 (Note: Appearances in European Cup) | 4 | — | | 40 | 10 |
| Real Madrid | 1979–80 | La Liga | 31 | 10 | 6 | 4 | — | | 4 | 1 | — | | 41 | 15 |
| Real Madrid | 1980–81 | La Liga | 33 | 19 | 4 | 2 | — | | 9 | 3 | — | | 46 | 24 |
| Real Madrid | 1981–82 | La Liga | 30 | 9 | 7 | 2 | — | | 6 (Note: Appearances in UEFA Cup) | 1 | — | | 43 | 12 |
| Real Madrid | 1982–83 | La Liga | 28 | 9 | 7 | 1 | 4 | 3 | 9 (Note: Appearances in European Cup Winners' Cup) | 4 | 1 (Note: Appearance in Supercopa de España) | 0 | 49 | 17 |
| Real Madrid | 1983–84 | La Liga | 31 | 17 | 7 | 3 | 0 | 0 | 2 | 1 | — | | 40 | 21 |
| Real Madrid | 1984–85 | La Liga | 17 | 0 | 1 | 0 | 5 | 1 | 7 | 3 | — | | 30 | 4 |
| Real Madrid | 1985–86 | La Liga | 28 | 4 | 4 | 0 | 2 | 0 | 9 | 0 | — | | 43 | 4 |
| Real Madrid | 1986–87 | La Liga | 25 | 1 | 3 | 0 | — | | 5 | 0 | — | | 33 | 1 |
| Real Madrid | Total | | 284 | 85 | 50 | 16 | 11 | 4 | 55 | 17 | 1 | 0 | 401 | 122 |
| Málaga | 1987–88 | Segunda División | 37 | 10 | 4 | 1 | — | | — | | — | | 41 | 11 |
| Málaga | 1988–89 | La Liga | 34 | 5 | 2 | 0 | — | | — | | — | | 36 | 5 |
| Málaga | Total | | 71 | 15 | 6 | 1 | — | | — | | — | | 77 | 16 |
| Los Boliches | 1990–91 | Segunda División B | 5 | 0 | 0 | 0 | — | | — | | — | | 5 | 0 |
| Los Boliches | Total | | 5 | 0 | 0 | 0 | — | | — | | — | | 5 | 0 |
| Career total | | | 464 | 125 | 74 | 19 | 11 | 4 | 55 | 17 | 1 | 0 | 602 | 165 |

=== International ===
Appearances and goals by national team and year
| National team | Year | Apps | Goals |
|---|---|---|---|
| Spain | 1976 | 1 | 0 |
| Spain | 1977 | 4 | 2 |
| Spain | 1978 | 5 | 0 |
| Spain | 1979 | 0 | 0 |
| Spain | 1980 | 10 | 1 |
| Spain | 1981 | 10 | 4 |
| Spain | 1982 | 4 | 1 |
| Total | | 34 | 8 |

Scores and results list Spain's goal tally first, score column indicates score after each Juanito goal.

List of international goals scored by Juanito
| No. | Date | Venue | Opponent | Score | Result | Competition |
|---|---|---|---|---|---|---|
| 1 | 27 March 1977 | Rico Pérez, Alicante, Spain | Hungary | 1–1 | 1–1 | Friendly |
| 2 | 4 October 1978 | Maksimir, Zagreb, Yugoslavia | Yugoslavia | 1–0 | 2–1 | Euro 1980 qualifying |
| 3 | 24 September 1980 | Népstadion, Budapest, Hungary | Hungary | 1–0 | 2–2 | Friendly |
| 4 | 18 February 1981 | Vicente Calderón, Madrid, Spain | France | 1–0 | 1–0 | Friendly |
| 5 | 23 June 1981 | Azteca, Mexico City, Mexico | Mexico | 1–0 | 3–1 | Friendly |
| 6 | 23 June 1981 | Azteca, Mexico City, Mexico | Mexico | 2–0 | 3–1 | Friendly |
| 7 | 28 June 1981 | Olímpico, Caracas, Venezuela | Venezuela | 1–0 | 2–0 | Friendly |
| 8 | 20 June 1982 | Luis Casanova, Valencia, Spain | Yugoslavia | 1–1 | 2–1 | 1982 FIFA World Cup |

== Honours ==
Real Madrid

- La Liga: 1977–78, 1978–79, 1979–80, 1985–86, 1986–87
- Copa del Rey: 1979–80, 1981–82
- Copa de la Liga: 1985
- UEFA Cup: 1984–85, 1985–86

Burgos

- Segunda División: 1975–76

Málaga

- Segunda División: 1987–88

Individual

- Don Balón Award – Best Spanish Player: 1976–77
- La Liga Team of The Year: 1976–77, 1978–79, 1979–80
- Pichichi Trophy: 1983–84
- UEFA Golden Jubilee Poll: 2004
