= Chendo =

Spanish footballer

Personal information
- Full name: Miguel Porlán Noguera
- Date of birth: 12 October 1961 (age 65)
- Place of birth: Totana, Spain
- Height: 1.75 m (5 ft 9 in)
- Position: Right-back

Youth career
- 1977–1979: Real Madrid

Senior career*
Years	Team	Apps	(Gls)
1979–1983	Castilla	67	(1)
1982–1998	Real Madrid	363	(3)
Total		430	(4)

International career
1981	Spain U19	4	(0)
1980–1984	Spain U21	9	(0)
1986–1990	Spain	26	(0)
- * Club domestic league appearances and goals

Miguel Porlán Noguera (born 12 October 1961), known as Chendo, is a Spanish former professional footballer who played as a right-back. He spent his entire career with Real Madrid, making 497 official appearances and winning several titles.

Chendo was a member of the Spain national team, being selected for two World Cups.

== Club career ==
Born in Totana, Region of Murcia, Chendo played professionally with Real Madrid for 17 seasons, winning seven La Liga titles, two Copa del Rey trophies, one UEFA Champions League, and back-to-back UEFA Cups. He arrived at the club at the age of 15 and was part of its junior ranks for five years, making his debut for the first team on 11 April 1982 in a 2–1 win at Castellón.

He got his opportunity at the starter position at the beginning of 1983–84, when Juan José, who dominated the right-back position, was injured. When Juan José returned to the first team, Chendo returned to the bench, but finished the season again as first-choice, making 26 competitive appearances.

Chendo became the starter in his fourth year, playing 25 league matches and adding 11 in European competition. At the end of the season, Real won the UEFA Cup against Hungarian club Fehérvár by a 3–1 aggregate score, and conquered the Copa de la Liga with a 4–3 aggregate victory over Atlético Madrid, with the player starting in both finals; the team finished fifth in the league, 17 points behind champions Barcelona.

For the next eight seasons, Chendo was the undisputed starter of a squad that collected five straight league titles. From 1992 to 1995, however, he would only make 34 league appearances, losing his place to Nando, Luis Enrique and Paco Llorente. Though he took part in 23 games in the 1995–96 campaign, he played second-fiddle to Quique Sánchez Flores, Carlos Secretário and Christian Panucci. Like Manolo Sanchís later, he was a moral supporter and a bench captain, subbing rarely and starting even more rarely.

After Real Madrid lifted their seventh European Cup against Juventus on 20 May 1998 (he did not play in the decisive match), Chendo retired from professional football, aged almost 37. He immediately started working with the club as a match delegate, occupying that position for well over two decades.

== International career ==
Chendo earned 26 caps for Spain, and played in the 1986 and 1990 FIFA World Cups. Backing up Atlético Madrid's Tomás in the former and starting in the latter, he totalled five appearances.

Chendo's debut came on 22 January 1986, in a friendly with the Soviet Union in Las Palmas.

== Personal life ==
On 2 July 1986, the 24-year-old Chendo was involved in a car accident near Quintanar de la Orden. He and his wife emerged unscathed, but their one-month old son Miguel died.

== Career statistics ==
Appearances and goals by club, season and competition
Club	Season	League			Copa de la Liga		Copa del Rey		Europe		Others		Total	
Club	Season	Division	Apps	Goals	Apps	Goals	Apps	Goals	Apps	Goals	Apps	Goals	Apps	Goals
Real Madrid	1981–82	La Liga	1	0	0	0	0	0	0	0	0	0	1	0
Real Madrid	1982–83	La Liga	2	0	0	0	0	0	0	0	0	0	2	0
Real Madrid	1983–84	La Liga	21	0	0	0	5	0	0	0	0	0	26	0
Real Madrid	1984–85	La Liga	25	0	6	0	1	0	11	0	0	0	43	0
Real Madrid	1985–86	La Liga	30	0	0	0	5	0	10	0	0	0	45	0
Real Madrid	1986–87	La Liga	40	0	0	0	6	0	8	0	0	0	52	0
Real Madrid	1987–88	La Liga	31	1	0	0	7	0	8	0	0	0	46	1
Real Madrid	1988–89	La Liga	26	0	0	0	7	0	5	0	0	0	38	0
Real Madrid	1989–90	La Liga	37	1	0	0	5	0	4	0	0	0	46	1
Real Madrid	1990–91	La Liga	36	0	0	0	0	0	5	0	0	0	40	0
Real Madrid	1991–92	La Liga	37	0	0	0	7	0	10	0	0	0	54	0
Real Madrid	1992–93	La Liga	12	0	0	0	4	0	2	0	0	0	16	0
Real Madrid	1993–94	La Liga	12	0	0	0	0	0	0	0	1	0	13	0
Real Madrid	1994–95	La Liga	10	1	0	0	0	0	2	0	0	0	12	1
Real Madrid	1995–96	La Liga	23	0	0	0	2	0	4	0	0	0	27	0
Real Madrid	1996–97	La Liga	16	0	0	0	2	0	0	0	0	0	18	0
Real Madrid	1997–98	La Liga	4	0	0	0	1	0	1	0	0	0	6	0
Real Madrid	Total		363	3	6	0	52	0	70	0	1	0	497	3

== Honours ==
Real Madrid

- La Liga: 1985–86, 1986–87, 1987–88, 1988–89, 1989–90, 1994–95, 1996–97
- Copa del Rey: 1988–89, 1992–93
- Copa de la Liga: 1985
- Supercopa de España: 1988, 1989, 1990, 1993, 1997
- UEFA Champions League: 1997–98
- UEFA Cup: 1984–85, 1985–86
- Copa Iberoamericana: 1994

Spain Under-21

- UEFA Under-21 European Championship runner-up: 1984

== See also ==
- List of one-club men
