= Calzada de Oropesa =

Municipality and village in Castile-La Mancha, Spain

Coordinates: 39°53′53″N 5°16′43″W

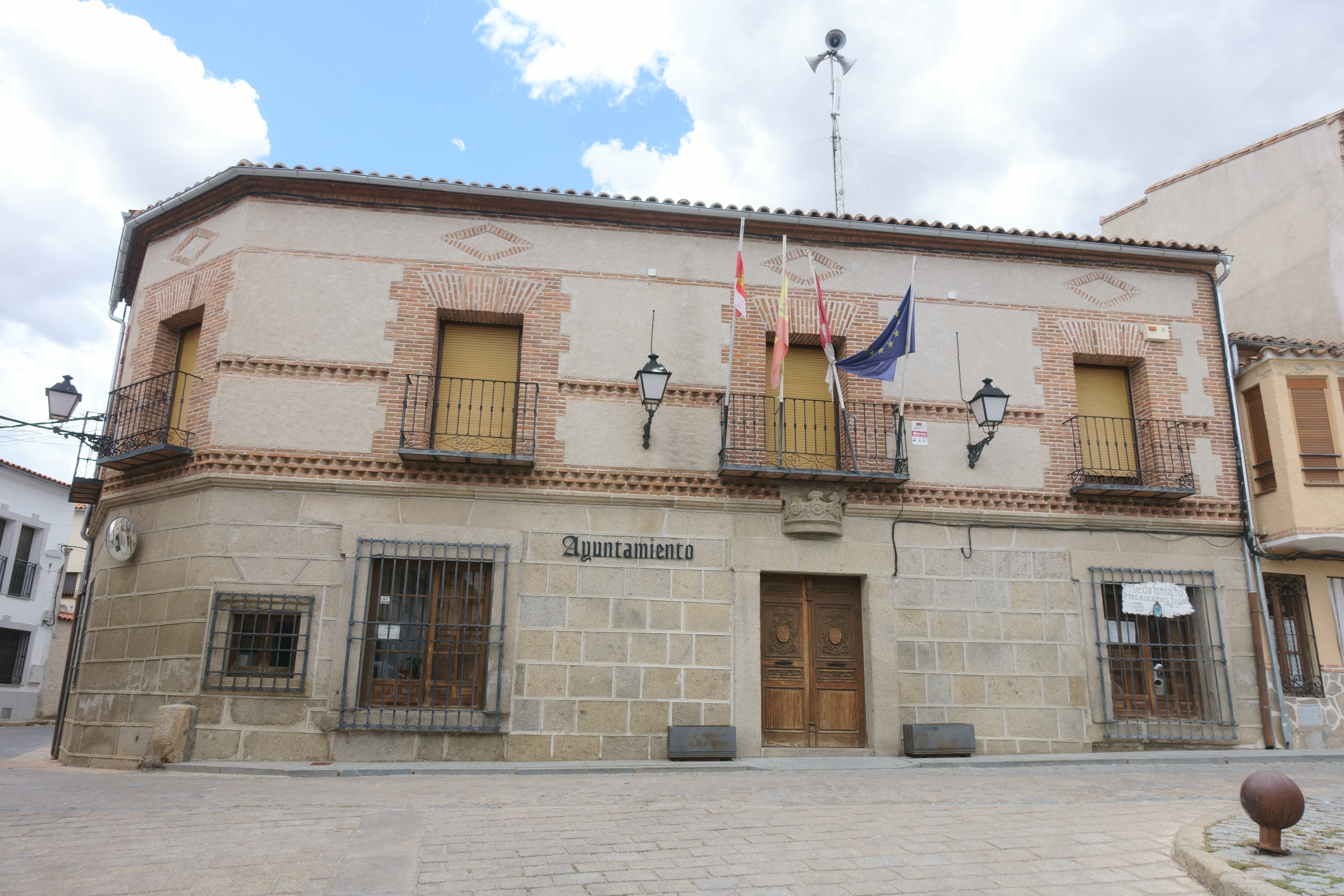
Town hall

Flag of Calzada de Oropesa

Coat of arms of Calzada de Oropesa

Calzada de Oropesa is a municipality and village in the province of Toledo and autonomous community of Castile-La Mancha, Spain.

== Demographics ==
Historical population
Year	Pop.	±%
1900	2,337	—
1910	2,637	+12.8%
1920	2,523	−4.3%
1930	2,561	+1.5%
1940	2,572	+0.4%
1950	2,940	+14.3%
1960	2,532	−13.9%
1970	1,557	−38.5%
1981	731	−53.1%
1991	730	−0.1%
2001	592	−18.9%
2011	570	−3.7%
2021	513	−10.0%
2023	498	−2.9%
Source: INE
