= Esteban Vigo =

Spanish football player and manager (born 1955)

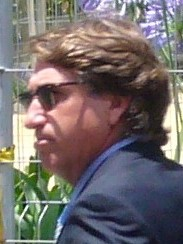
- Vigo in 2010

Personal information
- Full name: Esteban Vigo Benítez
- Date of birth: 17 January 1955 (age 71)
- Place of birth: Vélez-Málaga, Spain
- Height: 1.71 m (5 ft 7 in)
- Position: Midfielder

Youth career
- Santa María
- 1970–1972: Veleño

Senior career*
Years	Team	Apps	(Gls)
1972–1974	Atlético Malagueño		
1974–1977	Málaga	53	(7)
1974–1975	→ Marbella (loan)		
1977–1987	Barcelona	166	(18)
1987–1991	Málaga	109	(17)
Total		328	(42)

International career
1979–1980	Spain U23	6	(1)
1976	Spain amateur	3	(0)
1981	Spain B	3	(0)
1981	Spain	3	(0)

Managerial career
- 1995–1996: Almería
- 2001–2003: Barcelona C
- 2003–2004: Xerez
- 2004: Córdoba
- 2005: Progresul București (assistant)
- 2005: Universitatea Craiova (assistant)
- 2005–2006: Dinamo București
- 2007: Lleida
- 2008–2009: Xerez
- 2009–2011: Hércules
- 2012: Almería
- 2012–2013: Xerez
- 2021: Xerez
- * Club domestic league appearances and goals

Esteban Vigo Benítez (born 17 January 1955) is a Spanish former professional football midfielder and manager.

He spent the vast majority of his professional career with Málaga and Barcelona, amassing La Liga totals of 240 games and 24 goals over 13 seasons.

Vigo became a manager in 1995, going on to coach several clubs.

== Playing career ==
Known as Esteban during his playing days, he was born in Vélez-Málaga, and had his first professional spell with local Málaga, achieving promotion to La Liga in 1976. He subsequently attracted attention from giants Barcelona, who signed him in December 1976 for 25 million pesetas; he proceeded to be regularly used over the next decade, although he was never an undisputed starter (a maximum of 23 matches in 1980–81). He also scored the winner in a 3–1 Copa del Rey win against Sporting de Gijón in that same season.

Esteban returned to his first club in 1987, retiring four years later at the age of 36. He earned three caps for Spain over a two-month span in 1981 as the nation prepared for the FIFA World Cup to be held on home soil, but did not make the final cut. He also represented the country at the 1976 Summer Olympics.

== Coaching career ==
Taking up coaching afterwards, Vigo began in his native Andalusia with Almería, and continued to work mainly in the region, also having an abroad spell in Romania. In 2009 he led Xerez to their first top-tier promotion but, in July, switched to another side in the Segunda División, moving to Hércules and achieving the same as runner-up, with the Alicante club returning to the top flight after 13 years.

Vigo was sacked by Hércules on 21 March 2011, following a 0–4 home loss against Osasuna; it was the team's fourth consecutive defeat of the season, winning just one point out of 15 possible. He was named new manager of Almería on 4 April of the following year, replacing Lucas Alcaraz.

In July 2012, Vigo returned to Xerez on a two-year deal with the option of two more. He and his three assistants were dismissed the following February, with the team last-placed and seven points from safety (and eventually relegated in that position).

On 17 February 2021, Vigo returned for a fourth spell as manager of Xerez. He led the club to the promotion play-offs from Tercera División but lost to Ceuta, leaving in the aftermath.

== Outside football ==
Vigo released his autobiography, titled Ganador (winner), on 13 September 2010.

== Honours ==
=== Player ===
Barcelona

- La Liga: 1984–85
- Copa del Rey: 1977–78, 1980–81, 1982–83
- Supercopa de España: 1983
- Copa de la Liga: 1983, 1986
- UEFA Cup Winners' Cup: 1978–79, 1981–82

Málaga

- Segunda División: 1987–88

=== Manager ===
Xerez

- Segunda División: 2008–09
