= Paco Bonet =

Spanish footballer (born 1959)

Personal information
- Full name: Francisco Bonet Serrano
- Date of birth: 27 June 1959 (age 67)
- Place of birth: Almuñécar, Spain
- Height: 1.83 m (6 ft 0 in)
- Position: Centre-back

Youth career
- Molinar
- 1974–1977: Atlético Baleares

Senior career*
Years	Team	Apps	(Gls)
1977–1978	Atlético Baleares	19	(0)
1978–1982	Elche	64	(7)
1978–1979	→ Palencia (loan)	27	(2)
1980–1981	→ Mallorca (loan)	29	(16)
1982–1986	Real Madrid	44	(0)
1985–1986	Castilla	8	(1)
1986–1989	Mallorca	54	(1)
Total		245	(27)

International career
1982–1983	Spain	4	(0)
- * Club domestic league appearances and goals

Francisco "Paco" Bonet Serrano (born 27 June 1959) is a Spanish former professional footballer who played as a central defender.

He appeared in 98 La Liga matches over five seasons (one goal), with Real Madrid and Mallorca.

== Club career ==
Born in Almuñecar, Province of Granada, Andalusia, Bonet started his professional career with Elche CF, appearing in three Segunda División seasons with the club and also being loaned to RCD Mallorca during his tenure, being relocated to the city to perform his military service. In 1982 he signed with Real Madrid, making his La Liga debut on 5 September in a 2–2 away draw against Real Valladolid and going on to start in all his 24 appearances during the campaign to help to a second-place finish.

During the 1983 Copa del Rey final, Bonet suffered a serious injury following a tough tackle from FC Barcelona's Migueli, from which he never fully recovered. Whilst at the Santiago Bernabéu Stadium, he also played eight games in European competitions, seven of them in the UEFA Cup Winners' Cup.

Bonet retired in 1989 at the age of 30, after a couple of top-tier seasons with Mallorca.

== International career ==
Bonet earned four caps for Spain in six months. His first arrived on 27 October 1982, in a 1–0 home win over Iceland for the UEFA Euro 1984 qualifying stage.

== Honours ==
Real Madrid

- UEFA Cup: 1984–85
