= Alfonso Fraile =

Spanish painter

Alfonso Fraile was a Spanish painter. He was born in Marchena, Spain in 1930 and died in Madrid in 1988. He studied at the Escuela Superior de Bellas Artes, located in San Fernando de Henares, Spain.

== Work ==
Fraile's early work can be described as a form of cubism, which trended towards greater abstraction, and even primitivism, as his career progressed. In his later work he tended to minimize his subjects, isolating them in space, and working with broad swatches of bright colors, strong line and energetic brush work. He often explored a composition multiple times, often serially on a single canvas, at other times on several canvasses, in varying palettes.

Fraile held his first one-man show in Madrid in 1957, exhibiting his abstract pictures.

In collaboration with Joseph Vento Ruiz, and Medina and Julio Martín-Caro, Fraile founded the group, "Nuevo Espacialismo," reintroducing the figure with a narrative emphasis, citing the abstract expressionist painter Willem de Kooning as one of their influences. Fraile was particularly interested, at that time, in the unflinching realism of Goya.

Fraile's paintings are showcased at the Museo de Arte Contemporáneo in Madrid.

== Awards ==
- National Art Award, 1962
- Critics Award University of Madrid, 1963
- National Award for Plastic Arts, 1983

== Selected exhibitions ==
- Calouste Gulbenkian Foundation (Lisbon), 1986. Group exhibition. "Spanish Expressionists."
- Museo Juan Bartolo (Gijón), 1994
- Reina Sofia Museum (Madrid), 1998/99, Retrospective.

== Bibliography ==
ARA GARCIA, R. (1999): Recursos gráfico - plásticos en la configuración del espacio en la obra de Alfonso Fraile. Facultad de Bellas Artes, Universidad de la Laguna, Tenerife.
