= Marcos Alonso (footballer, born 1959) =

Spanish football player and manager (1959–2023)

Personal information
- Full name: Marcos Alonso Peña
- Date of birth: 1 October 1959
- Place of birth: Santander, Spain
- Date of death: 9 February 2023 (aged 63)
- Place of death: Madrid, Spain
- Height: 1.76 m (5 ft 9 in)
- Position: Winger

Youth career
- San Agustín
- Real Madrid

Senior career*
Years	Team	Apps	(Gls)
1977–1979	Racing Santander	51	(5)
1979–1982	Atlético Madrid	90	(10)
1982–1987	Barcelona	124	(28)
1987–1989	Atlético Madrid	29	(2)
1990	Logroñés	8	(1)
1991	Racing Santander	7	(3)
Total		309	(49)

International career
1978	Spain U18	3	(0)
1979	Spain U19	1	(0)
1979	Spain U20	3	(0)
1978	Spain U21	3	(0)
1980–1982	Spain U23	2	(0)
1979–1983	Spain amateur	9	(1)
1980	Spain B	3	(0)
1981–1985	Spain	22	(1)

Managerial career
- 1995–1996: Rayo Vallecano
- 1996–1998: Racing Santander
- 1998–2000: Sevilla
- 2000–2001: Atlético Madrid
- 2002: Zaragoza
- 2005–2006: Valladolid
- 2006: Málaga
- 2008: Granada 74
Medal record
Representing Spain
UEFA European Championship
Runner-up	1984 France
- * Club domestic league appearances and goals

Marcos Alonso Peña (1 October 1959 – 9 February 2023) was a Spanish football player and manager.

Known simply as Marcos in his playing days, he played mainly as a right winger but also as a forward. He amassed La Liga totals of 302 games and 46 goals over 13 seasons, with five being spent at Atlético Madrid and five at Barcelona.

A Spain international during the 1980s, Marcos represented the nation at Euro 1984, helping it to finish second. He later worked as a coach.

== Club career ==
Marcos was born in Santander, Cantabria. Following an unsuccessful spell in Real Madrid's academy, he made his La Liga debut aged 17 with his hometown side Racing de Santander. He was first choice in his position during his second professional season, which ended in relegation.

Marcos' reputation continued to grow at Atlético Madrid, and he was at the time the country's most expensive signing when FC Barcelona paid 150 million pesetas for his services in 1982. In his first year he scored six goals in 30 matches in the league, and also an injury time header against Real Madrid in that campaign's Copa del Rey final, which ended with a 2–1 win.

However, Marcos was also one of four Barça players who failed to find the net in the final of the 1985–86 European Cup against FC Steaua București, in a penalty shootout loss, as goalkeeper Helmut Duckadam saved all taken attempts. He retired in 1991 after a return to Atlético Madrid, marred by a serious knee injury, and after helping his first club Racing to return to the Segunda División.

Subsequently, Alonso became a coach. In his first experience he led lowly Rayo Vallecano to a first-ever victory over Real Madrid at the Santiago Bernabéu Stadium (2–1), managing Racing and Sevilla FC afterwards (one top-flight promotion with the latter followed by immediate relegation).

In the 2000s, Alonso was in charge of Atlético Madrid – second tier, no promotion– Real Zaragoza, Real Valladolid, Málaga CF and Granada 74 CF.

== International career ==
Alonso earned 22 caps for Spain, the first coming on 25 March 1981 in a 2–1 friendly win in England. He represented the nation at UEFA Euro 1984, being an unused squad member in an eventual runner-up finish.

== Personal life and death ==
Alonso's father, Marcos Alonso Imaz, was also a footballer, who represented Real Madrid in the 1950s and 1960s. His son Marcos Alonso Mendoza also played in the club's youth system and with Spain.

Alonso died on 9 February 2023 at age 63, due to cancer.

== Career statistics ==
Scores and results list Spain's goal tally first, score column indicates score after each Alonso goal.

List of international goals scored by Marcos Alonso
No.	Date	Venue	Opponent	Score	Result	Competition
1	12 June 1985	Laugardalsvöllur, Reykjavík, Iceland	Iceland	2–1	2–1	1986 World Cup qualification

== Honours ==
Barcelona

- La Liga: 1984–85
- Copa del Rey: 1982–83; runner-up 1983–84, 1985–86
- Supercopa de España: 1983; runner-up 1985
- Copa de la Liga: 1983
- European Cup runner-up: 1985–86

Racing Santander

- Segunda División B: 1990–91

Spain

- UEFA European Championship runner-up: 1984
