= Francisco Pineda (footballer, born 1959) =

Spanish footballer

Personal information
- Full name: Francisco Pineda García
- Date of birth: 31 January 1959 (age 67)
- Place of birth: Málaga, Spain
- Height: 1.76 m (5 ft 9 1/2 in)
- Position: Forward

Senior career*
Years	Team	Apps	(Gls)
1978–1980	Castilla	36	(8)
1980–1985	Real Madrid	91	(27)
1985–1988	Zaragoza	79	(18)
1988–1990	Málaga	8	(2)
Total		214	(55)

International career
1982	Spain U21	1	(0)
1982	Spain U23	1	(0)
1980	Spain B	2	(0)
- * Club domestic league appearances and goals

Francisco Pineda García (born 31 January 1959) is a Spanish retired footballer who played as a forward.

== Football career ==
Born in Málaga, Andalusia, Pineda started playing professionally at La Liga giants Real Madrid. He appeared relatively for the capital club during his five-year spell but, following the signing of Argentine Jorge Valdano and the emergence of youth product Emilio Butragueño, was deemed surplus to requirements – the team also did not win one single national championship in that timeframe – leaving in the 1985 summer.

Pineda subsequently signed for Real Zaragoza, winning the Copa del Rey in his debut season while adding seven goals in the league for the fourth-placed side. From 1988 onwards, however, he suffered greatly with injuries, hardly getting a game at the Aragonese and his following club, hometown's CD Málaga; he retired at the age of 31, immediately after his team's top flight relegation.

== Honours ==
Real Madrid

- Copa del Rey: 1981–82
- Copa de la Liga: 1985
- UEFA Cup: 1984–85

Zaragoza

- Copa del Rey: 1985–86
