= John Metgod =

Dutch footballer (born 1958)

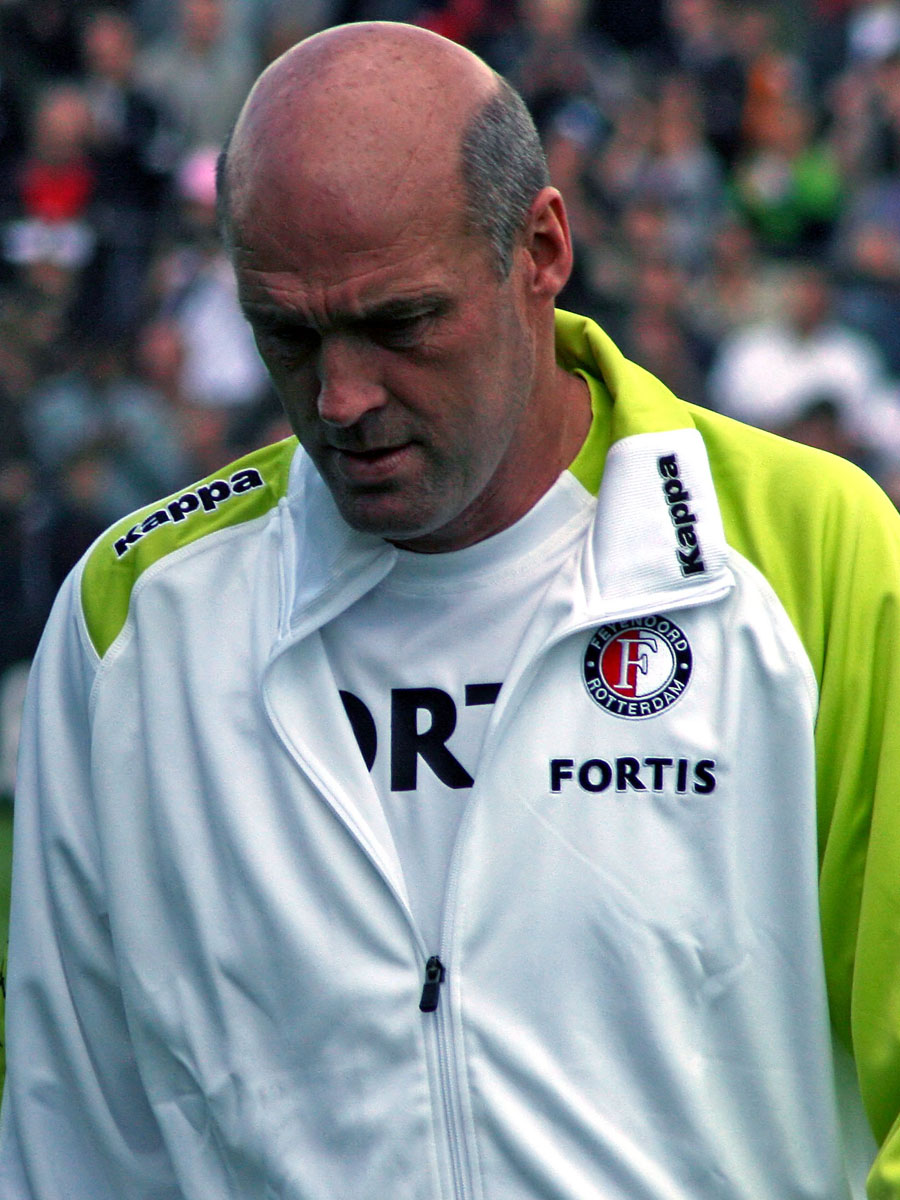
- Metgod in 2007

Personal information
- Full name: Johannes Anthonius Bernardus Metgod
- Date of birth: 27 February 1958 (age 68)
- Place of birth: Amsterdam, Netherlands
- Height: 6 ft 3 in (1.91 m)
- Position: Centre back

Team information
- Current team: ADO Den Haag (assistant manager)

Youth career
- DWS

Senior career*
Years	Team	Apps	(Gls)
1975–1976	HFC Haarlem	32	(1)
1976–1982	AZ Alkmaar	195	(26)
1982–1984	Real Madrid	50	(1)
1984–1987	Nottingham Forest	116	(15)
1987–1988	Tottenham Hotspur	12	(0)
1988–1994	Feyenoord	164	(13)
Total		568	(56)

International career
1978–1983	Netherlands	21	(4)

Managerial career
- 1994–1995: Feyenoord (youth director)
- 1995–1996: Excelsior (assistant manager)
- 1996–1997: Excelsior
- 1997: Feyenoord (interim)
- 1997: Excelsior (assistant manager)
- 1997–2004: Feyenoord (assistant manager)
- 2004–2005: Excelsior
- 2005–2007: Feyenoord (assistant manager)
- 2008–2009: Portsmouth (first team coach)
- 2009–2013: Derby County (first team coach)
- 2014: Colorado Rapids (assistant manager)
- 2014–2015: Brighton & Hove Albion (assistant manager)
- 2015–2016: ADO Den Haag (technical manager)
- 2017: Granada (assistant manager)
- 2018–2019: Nottingham Forest (assistant manager)
- 2019: United Arab Emirates (assistant manager)
- 2020-2022: United Arab Emirates (assistant manager)
- 2022-: ADO Den Haag (assistant manager)
- * Club domestic league appearances and goals

Johannes Anthonius Bernardus Metgod (born 27 February 1958) is a Dutch former professional footballer who works as assistant manager of United Arab Emirates.

== Club career ==
Playing as a centre-back, Metgod started his professional career in the 1970s playing for HFC Haarlem. After one season with Haarlem, he moved to play for AZ Alkmaar, spending six years at the club, including their UEFA Cup final defeat against English side Ipswich Town, during which he scored a goal in the 4–2 second leg win.

In 1982, Metgod moved to Spain to play for Real Madrid. He then moved to England in 1984 to sign for Nottingham Forest, where he was a regular player for three seasons before signing for Tottenham Hotspur in 1987. He spent just one season with the North London club before he moved back to the Netherlands, where he signed for Feyenoord. He spent six years at Feyenoord before finally retiring as a player in 1994.

== International career ==
Metgod won 21 caps for the Netherlands national team, scoring four goals.

== Style of play ==
Metgod was noted for his free-kicks, particularly during his spell at Nottingham Forest.

== Coaching career ==
After retiring Metgod became a coach, working for Excelsior Rotterdam and Feyenoord.

On 11 November 2008, Metgod was appointed first team coach by Portsmouth, but left the club on 8 February 2009 when manager Tony Adams was sacked.

On 21 May 2009, Metgod was appointed as a first team coach at Derby County, but left the club in October 2013 along with the rest of the coaching staff, following the dismissal of manager Nigel Clough.

In January 2014, Metgod was appointed as an assistant at Colorado Rapids.

In July 2014, Metgod was appointed as a scout at Brighton & Hove Albion.

On 1 July 2015, Metgod was appointed as a technical manager at ADO Den Haag and left in June 2016.

On 10 April 2017, Metgod was added to the staff at Granada CF by trainer Tony Adams, but left the club in May 2017 when manager Adams was sacked.

On 8 January 2018, Metgod was added to the staff at Nottingham Forest by trainer Aitor Karanka, but left the club on 10 January 2019 when manager Aitor Karanka resigned as coach. However, he continued at the club as a part of the board.

On 21 March 2019, he left Nottingham to become the assistant manager of United Arab Emirates national football team.

== Personal life ==
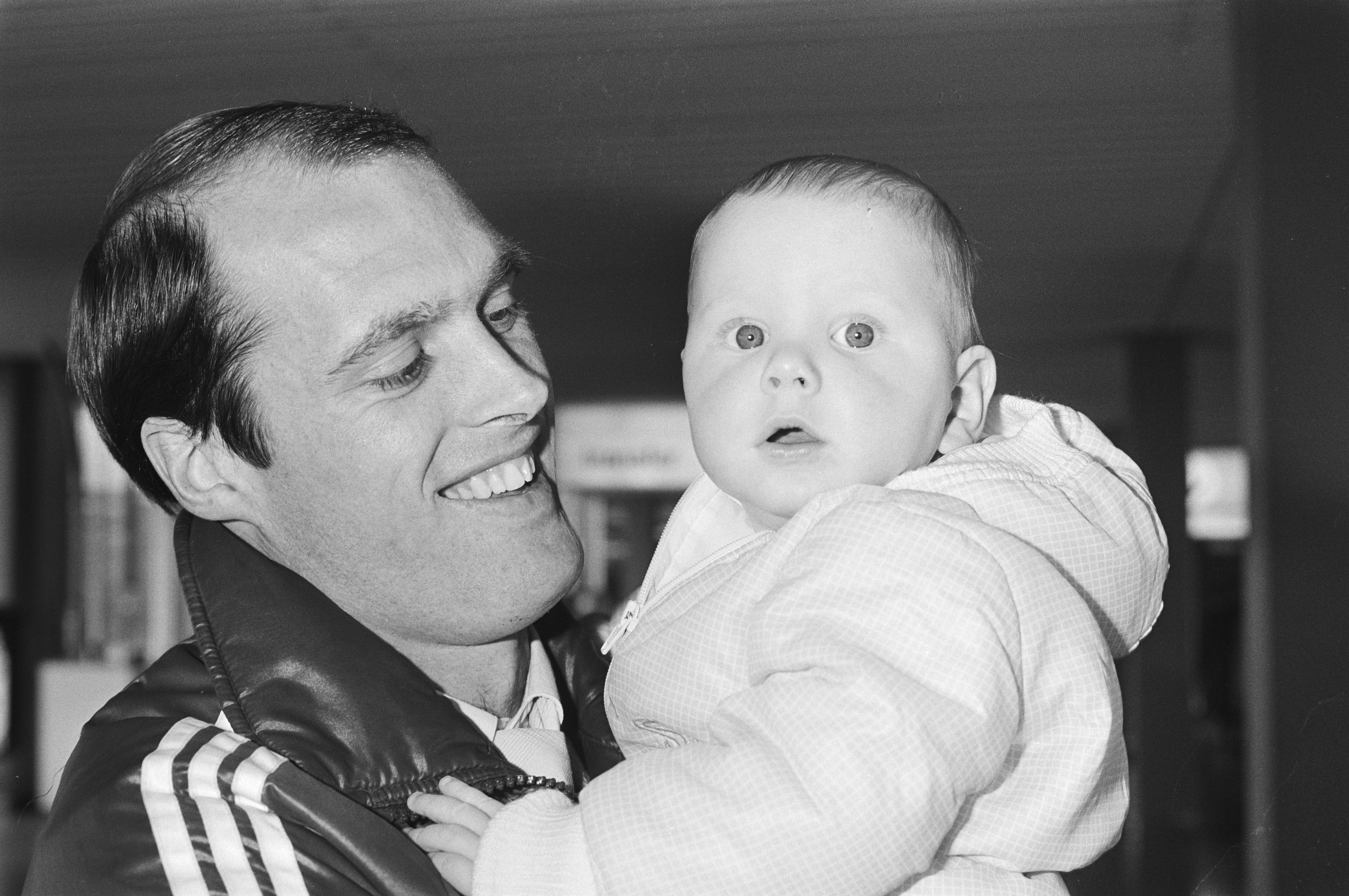
Metgod with son in 1983

Metgod was born in Amsterdam, Netherlands. Metgod's son, Dimitri, is also a professional footballer, playing as midfielder, whereas John's younger brother, Edward, is a retired goalkeeper.

== Career statistics ==
=== International ===
Appearances and goals by national team and year
National team	Year	Apps	Goals
Netherlands	1978	2	0
Netherlands	1979	5	2
Netherlands	1980	3	0
Netherlands	1981	6	2
Netherlands	1982	4	0
Netherlands	1983	1	0
Total		21	4

Scores and results list the Netherlands' goal tally first, score column indicates score after each Metgod goal.

List of international goals scored by John Metgod
No.	Date	Venue	Opponent	Score	Result	Competition
1	28 March 1979	Philips Stadion, Eindhoven, Netherlands	Switzerland	2–0	3–0	UEFA Euro 1980 qualification
2	5 September 1979	Laugardalsvöllur, Reykjavík, Iceland	Iceland	1–0	4–0	UEFA Euro 1980 qualification
3	1 September 1981	Hardturm, Zurich, Switzerland	Switzerland	1–2	1–2	Friendly
4	14 October 1981	De Kuip, Rotterdam, Netherlands	Belgium	1–0	3–0	1982 FIFA World Cup qualification

== Honours ==
AZ

- Eredivisie: 1980–81: runner-up 1979–80
- KNVB Cup: 1977–78, 1981, 1981–82
- UEFA Cup: runner-up 1980–81

Real Madrid

- La Liga: runner-up 1982–83, 1983–84
- Copa del Rey: runner-up 1982–83
- Supercopa de España: runner-up 1982
- Copa de la Liga: runner-up 1982–83
- European Cup Winners' Cup: runner-up 1983

Feyenoord

- Eredivisie: 1992–93; runner-up 1993–94
- KNVB Cup: 1990–91, 1991-92, 1993–94
- Dutch Super Cup (later renamed Johan Cruijff Shield): 1991
