= Juan José (footballer, born 1957) =

Spanish footballer

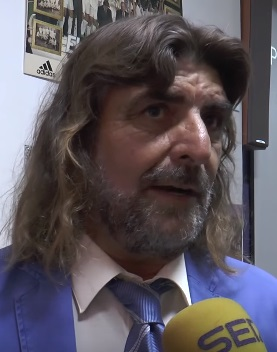

Personal information
- Full name: Juan José Jiménez Collar
- Date of birth: 29 July 1957 (age 69)
- Place of birth: Cádiz, Spain
- Height: 1.77 m (5 ft 10 in)
- Position: Right-back

Youth career
- Regina Pacis
- Cádiz

Senior career*
Years	Team	Apps	(Gls)
1975–1977	Cádiz B		
1977–1982	Cádiz	108	(2)
1977–1978	→ Jerez Industrial (loan)	25	(0)
1982–1985	Real Madrid	49	(0)
1985–1991	Cádiz	149	(0)
Total		331+	(2+)

International career
1982	Spain U23	1	(0)
1983	Spain amateur	2	(0)
1981	Spain B	1	(0)
1982–1983	Spain	4	(0)
- * Club domestic league appearances and goals

Juan José Jiménez Collar (born 29 July 1957), known as Juan José, is a Spanish former professional footballer who played as a right-back.

Nicknamed Sandokan due to striking similarities with the fictional character, he was mainly associated with Cádiz, but also spent three years with Real Madrid, appearing in 231 La Liga games in ten seasons.

== Club career ==
Born in Cádiz, Andalusia, Juan José started out with his hometown club Cádiz CF, in the Segunda División. In January 1982, he signed for La Liga giants Real Madrid with the deal being made effective on 1 July, being relatively used over three seasons; his only piece of silverware arrived in the last, but he had already lost his starting job to youngster Chendo.

Juan José closed out his career with his first team, helping the Andalusians to six consecutive top-flight campaigns while averaging 25 games per year. In 1990–91's promotion and relegation playoffs, 1–1 on aggregate against CD Málaga after 120 minutes, he scored their final attempt in the penalty shootout, and József Szendrei saved the next shot.

Juan José retired at the age of 34.

== International career ==
Juan José played four times for Spain, all coming in matches for the UEFA Euro 1984 qualifiers where the side eventually finished runners-up, although he did not make the final cut. He was the first Cádiz player to ever be called by the national team.

== Post-retirement ==
After retiring, Juan José was forced to return to active due to economic problems, working for several years in a shipyard amongst other jobs. In June 1993, he was arrested for his alleged participation in a cocaine distribution network.

== Honours ==
Real Madrid

- Copa de la Liga: 1985
- UEFA Cup Winners' Cup runner-up: 1982–83
