= Ricardo Gallego =

Spanish footballer

Personal information
- Full name: Ricardo Gallego Redondo
- Date of birth: 8 February 1959 (age 67)
- Place of birth: Madrid, Spain
- Height: 1.77 m (5 ft 10 in)
- Position: Defensive midfielder

Youth career
- 1973–1977: Real Madrid

Senior career*
Years	Team	Apps	(Gls)
1977–1980	Castilla	87	(4)
1980–1989	Real Madrid	250	(22)
1989–1990	Udinese	30	(2)
1991–1992	Rayo Vallecano	31	(1)
Total		398	(29)

International career
1977	Spain U18	3	(1)
1977	Spain U20	3	(0)
1978	Spain U21	2	(0)
1980–1981	Spain B	4	(0)
1982–1988	Spain	42	(2)
Medal record
Representing Spain
UEFA European Championship
Runner-up	1984 France
- * Club domestic league appearances and goals

Ricardo Gallego Redondo (born 8 February 1959) is a Spanish former professional footballer who played as a defensive midfielder.

Most of his career was associated to Real Madrid, for whom he appeared in 372 competitive games in nine years, winning a total of ten titles.

Gallego earned 42 caps for Spain, representing the nation in two World Cups and as many European Championships.

== Club career ==
A product of La Liga powerhouse Real Madrid's youth system, Madrid-born Gallego made a quick impression with the first team, appearing in 26 matches in his first year and being a midfield mainstay the following seasons as he totalled 250 top-division matches with the conquest of, among others, four leagues, two Copa del Rey and consecutive UEFA Cups (1985–86); blessed with physical and technical ability alike, he could operate with equal efficiency as sweeper.

In the 1986–87 campaign, Gallego contributed 37 appearances and two goals (more than 3,000 minutes) as Real Madrid won the national championship, also reaching the semi-finals of the domestic cup. On 15 March 1987, however, he landed on Miguel de Andrés' knee, and the Athletic Bilbao player ended his career after that game, a 2–1 win at the San Mamés Stadium.

Following a brief spell with Italy's Udinese Calcio, Gallego returned to Spain and the Spanish capital, spending one season with Rayo Vallecano in the Segunda División and achieving promotion. Retiring at 33, he then worked with his first and last clubs in directorial capacities.

== International career ==
Gallego played 42 times for Spain, his debut coming in a friendly prior to the impending FIFA World Cup on home soil, a 24 February 1982 victory over Scotland: after replacing FC Barcelona's Víctor Muñoz in the second half, he closed the score at 3–0.

After being used only once in that tournament, Gallego became a nuclear defensive player in the next two competitions: UEFA Euro 1984 (a runner-up finish) and the 1986 FIFA World Cup, retiring from international play after Euro 88. In mid-August 2011, he reunited with his former Spain and Real Madrid teammate José Antonio Camacho, acting as his assistant in the China national team.

=== International goals ===
#	Date	Venue	Opponent	Score	Result	Competition
1.	24 February 1982	Luis Casanova, Valencia, Spain	Scotland	3–0	3–0	Friendly
2.	26 May 1984	Charmilles, Geneva, Switzerland	Switzerland	0–2	0–4	Friendly

== Honours ==
Castilla

- Copa del Rey runner-up: 1979–80

Real Madrid

- La Liga: 1985–86, 1986–87, 1987–88, 1988–89
- Copa del Rey: 1981–82, 1988–89
- Supercopa de España: 1988
- Copa de la Liga: 1985
- UEFA Cup: 1984–85, 1985–86
