= Santillana (footballer) =

Spanish footballer (born 1952)

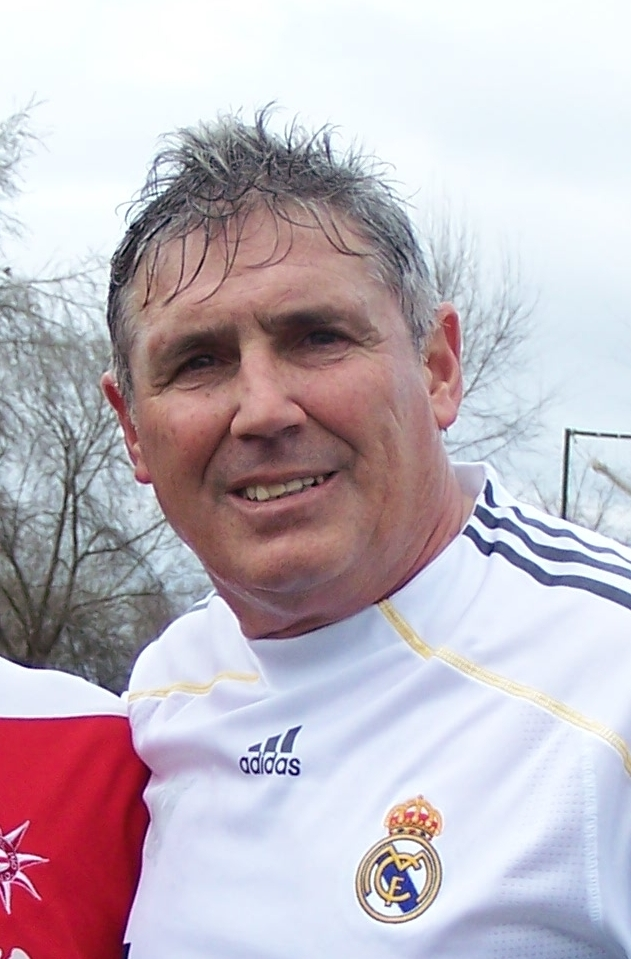
- Santillana in 2009

Personal information
- Full name: Carlos Alonso González
- Date of birth: 23 August 1952 (age 74)
- Place of birth: Santillana del Mar, Spain
- Height: 1.75 m (5 ft 9 in)
- Position: Striker

Youth career
- Satélite
- 1966–1970: Barreda

Senior career*
Years	Team	Apps	(Gls)
1970–1971	Racing Santander	35	(16)
1971–1988	Real Madrid	461	(186)
Total		496	(202)

International career
1970	Spain U18	1	(0)
1971	Spain U23	1	(0)
1971–1976	Spain amateur	6	(3)
1981	Spain B	1	(1)
1975–1985	Spain	56	(15)
Medal record
Representing Spain
UEFA European Championship
Runner-up	1984 France
- * Club domestic league appearances and goals

Carlos Alonso González (born 23 August 1952), known as Santillana, is a Spanish former professional footballer who played as a striker.

He was best known for his Real Madrid spell, which consisted of 17 La Liga seasons and 645 competitive matches. He signed with the club in 1971, from Racing de Santander.

The recipient of more than 50 caps for Spain, Santillana represented the nation in two World Cups and as many European Championships.

== Club career ==
Born in Santillana del Mar, Cantabria, Santillana (his nickname taken from his birthplace) started playing professionally with local Racing de Santander. He moved to Real Madrid and La Liga in 1971 alongside teammate Francisco Aguilar, aged just 19, and scored ten goals in 34 games in his debut season as the team were crowned league champions.

Santillana went on to win nine league titles, four Copa del Reys and two consecutive UEFA Cups, scoring in both finals. He played 645 first-team matches – a record which stood until Manolo Sanchís surpassed him during the 1997–98 campaign – and scored 290 goals; the eighth-highest all-time scorer in the first division, with 186 goals in 461 appearances, he never won the Pichichi Trophy.

After just 12 league appearances in 1987–88, in which he scored four times, Santillana retired from football at the age of 35, finding the net in a 2–1 home win against Real Valladolid. Madrid won three titles in a row in his final three seasons.

== International career ==
Santillana played 56 times and scored 15 goals for the Spain national team, his debut being on 17 April 1975 in a 1–1 draw with Romania for the UEFA Euro 1976 qualifiers held in Madrid. He represented his country in the 1978 and 1982 FIFA World Cups, as well as three European Championships: 1976, reaching the quarter-finals, 1980, failing to advance to the second round, and 1984 which ended with a runner-up finish to hosts France, with the player coming close to scoring the opener on a header saved just off the line by Luis Fernández.

On 21 December 1983, during a European Championship qualifying match against Malta that had to be won by 11 goals, Santillana scored a hat-trick in the first half and added a fourth in the second period, as Spain won 12–1 and qualified at the expense of the Netherlands.

== Style of play ==
Santillana possessed stellar heading skills despite not reaching 1.80 m, courtesy of his jumping ability, and was widely regarded as one of the best strikers in the history of Spanish football.

== Career statistics ==
=== Club ===
Appearances and goals by club, season and competition
Club	Season	League			Copa del Rey		Copa de la Liga		Continental		Other		Total	
Club	Season	Division	Apps	Goals	Apps	Goals	Apps	Goals	Apps	Goals	Apps	Goals	Apps	Goals
Racing Santander	1970–71	Segunda División	35	16	1	0	—		—		—		36	16
Real Madrid	1971–72	La Liga	34	10	6	3	—		4 (Note: Appearances in UEFA Cup)	2	—		44	15
Real Madrid	1972–73	La Liga	29	10	0	0	—		6 (Note: Appearances in European Cup)	5	—		35	15
Real Madrid	1973–74	La Liga	18	3	6	7	—		0	0	—		24	9
Real Madrid	1974–75	La Liga	32	17	7	3	—		4 (Note: Appearances in European Cup Winners' Cup)	3	—		43	23
Real Madrid	1975–76	La Liga	30	12	2	1	—		7	5	—		39	18
Real Madrid	1976–77	La Liga	30	12	2	0	—		4	1	—		36	13
Real Madrid	1977–78	La Liga	34	24	6	4	—		—		—		40	28
Real Madrid	1978–79	La Liga	33	18	11	6	—		4	2	—		48	26
Real Madrid	1979–80	La Liga	33	23	6	3	—		8	3	—		47	29
Real Madrid	1980–81	La Liga	31	13	4	1	—		8	3	—		43	17
Real Madrid	1981–82	La Liga	20	9	3	0	—		5	2	—		28	11
Real Madrid	1982–83	La Liga	27	9	6	8	5	5 (Note: Includes the first goal in the semi-finals of the Copa de la Liga against Real Zaragoza on 22 June 1983; some sites such as Be Soccer attribute it to Santillana, while others such as BDFutbol attribute it as an own goal by Eugenio Vitaller.)	9	8	1 (Note: Appearance in Supercopa de España)	0	48	29
Real Madrid	1983–84	La Liga	31	13	8	3	0	0	2	1	—		41	17
Real Madrid	1984–85	La Liga	22	4	2	0	5	3	8	5	—		37	12
Real Madrid	1985–86	La Liga	27	4	6	5	2	0	9	5	—		44	14
Real Madrid	1986–87	La Liga	18	1	2	1	—		5	2	—		25	4
Real Madrid	1987–88	La Liga	12	4	7	4	—		4	0	—		23	8
Real Madrid	Total		461	186	84	49	12	8	87	47	1	0	645	290
Career total			496	202	85	49	12	8	87	47	1	0	681	306

=== International ===
Scores and results list Spain's goal tally first, score column indicates score after each Santillana goal.

List of international goals scored by Santillana
No.	Date	Venue	Opponent	Score	Result	Competition
1	16 November 1975	23 August, Bucharest, Romania	Romania	2–0	2–2	Euro 1976 qualifying
2	24 April 1976	Vicente Calderón, Madrid, Spain	West Germany	1–0	1–1	Euro 1976 qualifying
3	4 October 1978	Maksimir, Zagreb, Yugoslavia	Yugoslavia	2–0	2–1	Euro 1980 qualifying
4	13 December 1978	El Helmántico, Villares de la Reina, Spain	Cyprus	3–0	5–0	Euro 1980 qualifying
5	13 December 1978	El Helmántico, Villares de la Reina, Spain	Cyprus	5–0	5–0	Euro 1980 qualifying
6	9 December 1979	Tsirion, Limassol, Cyprus	Cyprus	2–0	3–1	Euro 1980 qualifying
7	27 April 1983	La Romareda, Zaragoza, Spain	Republic of Ireland	1–0	2–0	Euro 1984 qualifying
8	16 November 1983	De Kuip, Rotterdam, Netherlands	Netherlands	1–1	1–2	Euro 1984 qualifying
9	21 December 1983	Benito Villamarín, Seville, Spain	Malta	1–0	12–1	Euro 1984 qualifying
10	21 December 1983	Benito Villamarín, Seville, Spain	Malta	2–1	12–1	Euro 1984 qualifying
11	21 December 1983	Benito Villamarín, Seville, Spain	Malta	3–1	12–1	Euro 1984 qualifying
12	21 December 1983	Benito Villamarín, Seville, Spain	Malta	9–1	12–1	Euro 1984 qualifying
13	11 April 1984	Luis Casanova, Valencia, Spain	Denmark	1–1	2–1	Friendly
14	26 May 1984	Charmilles, Geneva, Switzerland	Switzerland	4–0	4–0	Friendly
15	17 June 1984	Vélodrome, Marseille, France	Portugal	1–1	1–1	UEFA Euro 1984

== Honours ==
Real Madrid

- La Liga: 1971–72, 1974–75, 1975–76, 1977–78, 1978–79, 1979–80, 1985–86, 1986–87, 1987–88
- Copa del Rey: 1973–74, 1974–75, 1979–80, 1981–82
- Copa de la Liga: 1985
- UEFA Cup: 1984–85, 1985–86

Spain

- UEFA European Championship runner-up: 1984

Individual

- Pichichi Trophy (Segunda División): 1970–71

== See also ==
- List of La Liga players (400+ appearances)
- List of Real Madrid CF records and statistics
