= José Antonio Salguero =

Spanish footballer

Personal information
- Full name: José Antonio Salguero García
- Date of birth: 25 January 1960 (age 66)
- Place of birth: Fuente de Piedra, Spain
- Height: 1.80 m (5 ft 11 in)
- Position: Centre-back

Senior career*
Years	Team	Apps	(Gls)
1977–1978	Atlético Malagueño	36	(0)
1978–1980	Málaga	22	(1)
1980–1982	Castilla	68	(3)
1982–1987	Real Madrid	83	(8)
1987–1992	Sevilla	178	(12)
1992–1995	Mérida	104	(7)
Total		491	(31)

International career
1980–1981	Spain U21	7	(0)
- * Club domestic league appearances and goals

José Antonio Salguero García (born 25 January 1960) is a Spanish former professional footballer who played as a central defender.

In La Liga, he played almost exclusively with Real Madrid (six seasons) and Sevilla (five), winning six titles with the former club. His senior career lasted 18 years.

== Club career ==
Born in Fuente de Piedra, Province of Málaga, Salguero started playing professionally with his hometown club CD Málaga, making his La Liga debut in 1979–80 in a relegation-ending campaign. In the subsequent off-season he signed for Real Madrid, but spent almost two entire years with their reserves, being nonetheless part of the squad that won the 1982 Copa del Rey.

Salguero only managed to start regularly for Madrid in 1986–87, making 28 appearances – and partnering legendary Manolo Sanchís as centre-back – as they won the national championship. Previously, he was relatively used in back-to-back UEFA Cup conquests, and left in 1987 with 138 competitive games to his credit.

Subsequently, Salguero played five seasons with Sevilla FC, rarely missing a match for the Andalusians. In the 1989–90 season they managed to finish sixth and qualify for the UEFA Cup, being ousted in the second round by Russian side FC Torpedo Moscow.

Aged 32, Salguero moved to Segunda División and joined CP Mérida, being first-choice during his three-year spell and helping the Extremadura team to promote to the top division for the first time ever in 1995. He retired with totals of 278 games and 21 goals over 12 seasons in the latter competition, and later worked in a law firm.

== Honours ==
Real Madrid

- La Liga: 1985–86, 1986–87
- Copa del Rey: 1981–82; runner-up: 1982–83
- Copa de la Liga: 1985
- UEFA Cup: 1984–85, 1985–86
- UEFA Cup Winners' Cup runner-up: 1982–83
- Supercopa de España runner-up: 1982

Mérida

- Segunda División: 1994–95
