= 1981–82 Real Madrid CF season =

80th season in existence of Real Madrid CF

Real Madrid CF
1981–82 season
- President: Luis de Carlos
- Head coach: Vujadin Boškov (until 29 March 1982); Luis Molowny
- Stadium: Santiago Bernabéu
- Primera Division: 3rd
- Copa del Rey: Winners (in European Cup Winners' Cup)
- UEFA Cup: Quarter-finals
- Top goalscorer: League: Juanito, Santillana and Stielike (9); All: Juanito (12)
Home colours	Away colours

The 1981–82 season is Real Madrid Club de Fútbol's 80th season in existence and the club's 51st consecutive season in the top flight of Spanish football.

== Summary ==
Owing to financial issues, President Luis de Carlos, for the second consecutive summer, chose not to reinforce the club for the campaign with high-profile players and on 6 September 1981 announced his candidacy for seeking reelection as president. After struggling the first half of the League season trailing behind FC Barcelona and Real Sociedad, Boškov managed the squad to the first spot briefly during January. Then, the team collapsed in the League table during February with a bad series of results included six matches without victory. Finally, Boškov left the club on 29 March 1982 being replaced by Luis Molowny for the last four rounds finishing on the 3rd place three points below back-to-back Champions Real Sociedad . In UEFA Cup the club could won the series against Tatabányai in First Round, Carl Zeiss Jena in Second Round and Rapid Wien in Eightfinals. Then, in Quarterfinals was eliminated by Western German side FC Kaiserslautern in spite of having won 3–1 the first match of the series for the second leg the squad was defeated with a massive 0–5 score. The result shattered the chances of Boškov to remain as head coach for the next year.

In Copa del Rey the squad reached the 1982 Copa del Rey Final and won the trophy after defeating Sporting Gijón 2–1 at Estadio José Zorrilla in front of 30,000 spectators. It was the last cup and season of a short period through the club history known as "Madrid of Los García (1978–82)", seven players with surname "García" were registered to the squad for this campaign.

== Squad ==
Note: Flags indicate national team as defined under FIFA eligibility rules; some limited exceptions apply. Players may hold more than one non-FIFA nationality.

No.	Pos.	Nation	Player
—	GK	ESP	Miguel Ángel
—	DF	ESP	San José
—	DF	ESP	García Cortés
—	DF	ESP	José Antonio Camacho
—	MF	FRG	Uli Stielike
—	MF	ESP	Ricardo Gallego
—	MF	ESP	Vicente del Bosque
—	MF	ESP	Ángel
—	FW	ESP	Santillana
—	FW	ESP	Juanito
—	FW	ESP	Ito

No.	Pos.	Nation	Player
—	GK	ESP	Agustín
—	FW	ESP	Isidro
—	MF	ESP	García Hernández
—	FW	ESP	Pineda García
—	DF	ESP	García Navajas
—	GK	ESP	García Remón
—	DF	ESP	Andrés Sabido
—	MF	ESP	Carcelén
—	DF	ESP	Goyo Benito
—	FW	ENG	Laurie Cunningham
—	DF	ESP	Pérez García
—	MF	ESP	Miguel Ángel Portugal

=== Transfers ===
In
Pos.	Name	from	Type
FW	Ito	UD Salamanca	
MF	Juan Antonio Carcelén	Hércules CF	

Out
Pos.	Name	To	Type
MF	Hipólito Rincón	Real Betis	

== Competitions ==
=== Primera Division ===
==== Position by round ====
Round	1	2	3	4	5	6	7	8	9	10	11	12	13	14	15	16	17	18	19	20	21	22	23	24	25	26	27	28	29	30	31	32	33	34
Ground	A	H	A	H	A	H	A	H	A	H	H	A	H	A	H	A	H	H	A	H	A	H	A	H	A	H	A	A	H	A	H	A	H	A
Result	L	W	D	W	D	W	L	W	W	W	W	L	W	W	W	L	W	D	W	W	W	W	L	D	L	D	D	D	W	L	D	W	W	L
Position	14	12	11	5	8	4	7	4	4	3	3	3	3	3	2	3	2	2	2	1	1	1	2	2	2	3	3	3	2	3	3	3	3	3

Source: www.lfp.es
A = Away; H = Home; W = Win; D = Draw; L = Loss; = Leader, 1982-83 European Cup; = 1982-83 UEFA Cup; = 1982-83 Segunda División

==== League table ====
Pos	Team	Pld	W	D	L	GF	GA	GD	Pts	Qualification or relegation
1	Real Sociedad (C)	34	20	7	7	58	33	+25	47	Qualification for the European Cup first round
2	Barcelona	34	19	7	8	75	40	+35	45	Qualification for the Cup Winners' Cup first round (Note: Real Madrid qualified for the European Cup Winners' Cup by winning the Copa del Rey, while Barcelona for the tournament as title holders.)
3	Real Madrid	34	18	8	8	57	34	+23	44	Qualification for the Cup Winners' Cup first round
4	Athletic Bilbao	34	18	4	12	63	41	+22	40	Qualification for the UEFA Cup first round
5	Valencia	34	17	5	12	54	46	+8	39	Qualification for the UEFA Cup first round

Source: BDFútbol
Rules for classification: 1) Points; 2) Head-to-head results; 3) Goal difference; 4) Number of goals scored
(C) Champions

==== Matches ====
20 September 1981 1	Real Sociedad	3–1	Real Madrid	San Sebastián
	Ufarte 20'; Alonso 64' (yellow card); Zamora 72'	Report	Ito 2'; Garcia Navajas (yellow card); Sabido (yellow card)	Stadium: Atotxa; Referee: Victoriano Arminio

26 September 1981 2	Real Madrid	2–1	Atlético Madrid	Madrid
	Santillana 20'; Stielike 68' (yellow card); Gallego (yellow card); Juanito (yellow card); Garcia Navajas (yellow card); Sabido (yellow card)	Report	Ramos 48' (yellow card); Alonso (yellow card); Balbino (yellow card)	Stadium: Estadio Santiago Bernabéu; Referee: Jose Negreira

4 October 1981 3	Sevilla CF	0–0	Real Madrid	Sevilla
	Pinino (yellow card)	Report		Stadium: Estadio Sanchez Pizjuan

7 October 1981 4	Real Madrid	2–1	Hércules CF	Madrid
	Santillana 4'; Stielike 19'	Report	5' Ramos	Stadium: Estadio Santiago Bernabéu; Referee: Luis Gonzalez

11 October 1981 5	Real Zaragoza	2–2	Real Madrid	Zaragoza
	Kasuko 22'; Amarilla 54'; Valdano (yellow card); Alonso (yellow card); Onaderra (yellow card)	Report	Gonzalez 32'; Garcia Cortez 81'	Stadium: La Romareda; Referee: Ildefonso Azpitare

17 October 1981 6	Real Madrid	3–0	Valencia CF	Madrid
	Juanito 40'; Uli Stielike 46' (yellow card); Santillana 78' (yellow card) 88' (yellow-red card); Garcia Cortes (yellow card)	Report	(yellow card) Castellanos	Stadium: Estadio Santiago Bernabéu; Referee: Joaquin Velazquez

25 October 1981 7	Español	1–0	Real Madrid	Barcelona
	Corominas 17'; Ayufuh (yellow card)	Report		Stadium: Estadio Sarriá; Referee: Bartolomé Moro

31 October 1981 8	Real Madrid	1–0	Osasuna	Madrid
	Del Bosque 72'	Report		Stadium: Santiago Bernabeu; Referee: Victoriano Arminio

7 November 1981 9	Athletic Bilbao	1–2	Real Madrid	Bilbao
	Noriega 2'	Report	13' Gallego; 32' Santillana	Stadium: San Mames; Referee: Manuel Markenda

11 November 1981 10	Real Madrid	3–1	Real Valladolid	Madrid
	Stielike 43'; Juanito 56'; Santillana 74'	Report	78' Muñoz	Stadium: Estadio Santiago Bernabéu; Referee: Raul De Loza

15 November 1981 11	Real Madrid	4–1	Real Betis	Madrid
	Camacho 4'; Santillana 24'; Garcia Cortez 27'; Juanito 69'; Goyo Benito (yellow card)	Report	79' Lopez; (yellow card) Ortega	Stadium: Estadio Santiago Bernabéu; Referee: Ildefonso Azpitare

22 November 1981 12	Cádiz CF	1–0	Real Madrid	Cádiz
	Mane 40'; Mayas (yellow card); Vasa (yellow card)	Report		Stadium: Ramón Carranza; Referee: Joaquin Marcos

29 November 1981 13	Real Madrid	2–1	UD Las Palmas	Madrid
	Juanito 16'; Hernandez 65'; Gonzalez (yellow card)	Report	Savedra 40'; Calvo (yellow card); Juan (yellow card); Maye (yellow card); Fortunato (red card) 86'	Stadium: Santiago Bernabeu; Referee: Juan Oliver

6 December 1981 14	Sporting Gijón	0–1	Real Madrid	Gijón
	Joaquin (yellow card); Redondo (yellow card)	Report	21' Garcia Cortez; (yellow card) San Jose	Stadium: Estadio El Molinon; Referee: Sebastian Rendon

13 December 1981 15	Real Madrid	4–0	CD Castellón	Madrid
	Stielike 13' (pen.); Pineda Garcia 47' 52'; Angel 77'	Report		Stadium: Estadio Santiago Bernabéu; Referee: Antonio del Barrio

20 December 1981 16	FC Barcelona	3–1	Real Madrid	Barcelona
	Alexanko 7'; Quini 53'; Quini 60' (pen.); Esteban Vigo (yellow card)	Report	Juanito 49'	Stadium: Camp Nou; Referee: García Carrión

27 December 1981 17	Real Madrid	4–0	Racing Santander	Madrid
	Juanito 1'; Juanito 53' (yellow card); Garcia Hernandez 30'; Gallego 64'	Report	Mantilla (yellow card)	Stadium: Estadio Santiago Bernabéu; Referee: Jose Carrion

2 January 1982 18	Real Madrid	1–1	Real Sociedad	Madrid
	Ito 71'; Juanito (yellow card); Pineda Garcia (yellow card); Angel (yellow card)	Report	Uralde 86' (yellow card); Satrustegui (yellow card); Gorritz (yellow card)	Stadium: Estadio Santiago Bernabéu; Referee: Bartolome Madrid

10 January 1982 19	Atlético Madrid	2–3	Real Madrid	Madrid
	Rubio 21' (yellow card); Alonso 34' (red card) 82'; Alberto (yellow card); Artece (yellow card) (red card) 87'; Aguinaga (yellow card)	Report	Gallego 44'; Uli Stielike 82' (pen.); Pineda Garcia 85' (yellow card) (red card) 90'; Juanito (yellow card); San Jose (yellow card)	Stadium: Estadio Vicente Calderón; Referee: Ildefonso Azpitare

17 January 1982 20	Real Madrid	2–1	Sevilla CF	Madrid
	Santillana 40'; Stielike 80'	Report	Magdaleno 45'; Alvarez (yellow card); Pininho (yellow card)	Stadium: Estadio Santiago Bernabéu; Referee: Victoriano Arminio

24 January 1982 21	Hércules CF	0–1	Real Madrid	Alicante
	Cartagena (yellow card); Albadalejo (yellow card)	Report	Cartiena 79' (o.g.)	Stadium: Jose Rico Perez; Referee: Joaquin Marcos

31 January 1982 22	Real Madrid	3–0	Real Zaragoza	Madrid
	Gallego 42'; Juanito 70' 87'	Report	Kasahus (yellow card)	Stadium: Estadio Bernabeu; Referee: Bartolome Morro

7 February 1982 23	Valencia CF	2–1	Real Madrid	Valencia
	Sura 47'; Subirats 51'; Arias (yellow card); Carreta (yellow card); Solsona (yellow card)	Report	Santillana 55'; Pineda Garcia (yellow card); San Jose (yellow card)	Stadium: Estadio Mestalla; Referee: Jose Negreira

14 February 1982 24	Real Madrid	1–1	Español	Madrid
	Ito 4'	Report	Jimenez 42'; Escalza (yellow card)	Stadium: Estadio Santiago Bernabéu; Referee: Bartolome Madrid

22 February 1982 25	Osasuna	3–2	Real Madrid	Pamplona
	Montreal 13'; Irigibel 52'; Echeverria 83'; Mina (yellow card)	Report	19' Camacho; 21' Pineda Garcia	Stadium: Estadio El Sadar; Referee: Raul De Loza

28 February 1982 26	Real Madrid	1–1	Athletic Bilbao	Bilbao
	Pineda Garcia 41'; Camacho (yellow card)	Report	46' Dani	Stadium: San Mames; Referee: Jose Pastor

7 March 1982 27	Real Valladolid	0–0	Real Madrid	Valladolid
	Wales (yellow card)	Report		Stadium: Estadio José Zorrilla; Referee: Bartolome Madrid

14 March 1982 28	Real Betis	0–0	Real Madrid	Sevilla
	Ortega (yellow card); Lopez (yellow card); Benitez (yellow card)	Report	(yellow card) Camacho; (yellow card) Stielike; (yellow card) Gallego	Stadium: Estadio Benito Villamarin; Referee: Joaquin Velazquez

21 March 1982 29	Real Madrid	2–0	Cádiz CF	Madrid
	Del Bosque 5'; Hernandez 17'	Report	(yellow card) Linares	Stadium: Estadio Santiago Bernabéu; Referee: Jaime Guerrero

28 March 1982 30	UD Las Palmas	1–0	Real Madrid	Las Palmas de Gran Canaria
	Fortunato 79'; Estevez (yellow card); Felipe (yellow card); Suarez (yellow card); Juan (red card) 87'	Report	(yellow card) (red card) 88' Garcia Cortez; (yellow card) Gallego	Stadium: Estadio Insular; Referee: Ernesto Nunez

4 April 1982 31	Real Madrid	1–1	Sporting Gijón	Madrid
	Ito 73'; Juanito (yellow card)	Report	62' David; (yellow card) Maqueda; (yellow card) Mesa; (yellow card) Abel	Stadium: Estadio Santiago Bernabéu; Referee: Bartolome Morro

11 April 1982 32	CD Castellón	1–2	Real Madrid	Castellón de la Plana
	Tiko 40'; Kunde (yellow card)	Report	35' (pen.) Michel; 86' Salguero	Stadium: Nou Stadi Castilla; Referee: Juan Oliver

18 April 1982 33	Real Madrid	3–1	FC Barcelona	Madrid
	García Cortés 6'; Uli Stielike 45' (pen.); Isidro 82'; Gallego (yellow card); Juanito (yellow card) 45'; Pineda Garcia (yellow card)	Report	42' Quini; 19' Víctor Muñoz; (yellow card) Zuviría; (yellow card) 86' (yellow-red card) Morán	Stadium: Estadio Santiago Bernabéu; Referee: García de Loza

25 April 1982 34	Racing Santander	3–2	Real Madrid	Santander
	Setien 18'; Veron 41' 83'; Mantilla (yellow card)	Report	26' Santillana; 87' (pen.) Stielike	Stadium: Estadio El Sardinero; Referee: Ernesto Nunez

=== Copa del Rey ===
==== Eightfinals ====
20 January 1982	CD Málaga	1–1	Real Madrid CF	Málaga
21:30 CET	Cantarutti 75'	Report (in Spanish)	Stielike 51' (pen.)	Stadium: La Rosaleda; Referee: Manuel Fandos

27 January 1982	Real Madrid CF	5–1	CD Málaga	Madrid
20:45 CET	Hernández 7'; Cortés 10'; Ito 39'; Gallego 42'; Juanito 62'	Report (in Spanish)	Popo 38'	Stadium: Santiago Bernabéu; Referee: Felipe Crespo Aurré

==== Quarter-finals ====
3 February 1982	Real Madrid CF	0–0	Atlético de Madrid	Madrid
21:00 CET		Report (in Spanish)		Stadium: Santiago Bernabéu; Referee: José Luis García Carrión

17 February 1982	Atlético de Madrid	0–1	Real Madrid CF	Madrid
21:00 CET		Report (in Spanish)	Gallego 73'	Stadium: Vicente Calderón; Referee: Victoriano Sánchez Arminio

==== Semi-finals ====
10 March 1982	Real Sociedad	1–0	Real Madrid CF	San Sebastián
20:00 CET	Satrústegui 63'	Report (in Spanish)		Stadium: Atotxa; Referee: José María Enríquez Negreira

31 March 1982	Real Madrid CF	1–0 (a.e.t.) (4–3 p)	Real Sociedad	Madrid
21:00 CET	Juanito 89'	Report (in Spanish)		Stadium: Santiago Bernabéu; Referee: José María Enríquez Negreira
	Penalties
	Camacho (penalty missed); Cunningham (penalty scored); García Hernández (penalty missed); Juanito (penalty scored); San José (penalty scored); Ito (penalty scored)		(penalty missed) Kortabarria; (penalty scored) López Ufarte; (penalty missed) Diego; (penalty scored) Larrañaga; (penalty scored) Periko Alonso; (penalty missed) Murillo

==== Final ====
13 April 1982	Real Madrid	2–1	Sporting de Gijón	Estadio Nuevo José Zorrilla, Valladolid
20:15 CET	Jiménez 4' (o.g.); Ángel 57'	Report (in Spanish)	Ferrero 36' (pen.)	Attendance: 30,000; Referee: Victoriano Sánchez Arminio

=== UEFA Cup ===
==== Second round ====
21 October 1981	Real Madrid (Spain)	3–2	(East Germany) Carl Zeiss Jena	Madrid
21:00	Cortés 66' (pen.); Gallego 76'; Isidro 78'		Bielau 36'; Kurbjuweit 72'	Stadium: Santiago Bernabéu; Referee: (Belgium) Marcel Van Langenhove

4 November 1981	Carl Zeiss Jena (East Germany)	0–0	(Spain) Real Madrid	Jena
20:00				Stadium: Ernst-Abbe-Sportfeld; Referee: (Scotland) Brian Mcginlay

==== Eightfinals ====
25 November 1981	Rapid Wien (Austria)	0–1	(Spain) Real Madrid	Wien
17:00			Santillana 79'	Stadium: Gerhard Hanappi Stadium; Referee: (France) Georges Konrath

9 December 1981	Real Madrid (Spain)	0–0	(Austria) Rapid Wien	Madrid
21:00				Stadium: Santiago Bernabéu; Referee: (Switzerland) Jack Baumann

==== Quarterfinals ====
3 March 1982	Real Madrid (Spain)	3–1	(West Germany) 1. FC Kaiserslautern	Madrid
21:00	Cunningham 25'; Hernández 34'; Juanito 68'		Eilenfeldt 81' (pen.)	Stadium: Santiago Bernabéu; Referee: Vojtech Christov (Czechoslovakia)

17 March 1982	1. FC Kaiserslautern (West Germany)	5–0	(Spain) Real Madrid	Kaiserslautern
21:00	Funkel 7', 17'; Bongartz 48'; Eilenfeldt 54'; Geye 71'			Stadium: Fritz-Walter-Stadion; Referee: Károly Palotai (Hungary)

== Statistics ==
=== Players statistics ===
No.	Pos	Nat	Player	Total		Primera Division		Copa del Rey		UEFA Cup	
No.	Pos	Nat	Player	Apps	Goals	Apps	Goals	Apps	Goals	Apps	Goals
	GK	(Spain) ESP	Miguel Ángel	23	-21	18	-17	0	0	5	-4
	DF	(Spain) ESP	San José	32	0	19+5	0	3	0	4+1	0
	DF	(Spain) ESP	García Cortés	45	6	30+1	4	6+1	1	7	1
	DF	(Spain) ESP	Camacho	48	2	33	2	7	0	8	0
	MF	(West Germany) FRG	Stielike	41	10	28	9	7	1	6	0
	MF	(Spain) ESP	Gallego	45	7	28+3	4	6	2	8	1
	MF	(Spain) ESP	Del Bosque	34	2	23	2	5	0	6	0
	MF	(Spain) ESP	Ángel	38	2	24+4	1	2+2	1	6	0
	FW	(Spain) ESP	Juanito	43	12	30	9	7	2	6	1
	FW	(Spain) ESP	Santillana	28	11	20	9	3	0	5	2
	FW	(Spain) ESP	Ito	33	5	19+7	4	3+2	1	2	0
	GK	(Spain) ESP	Agustín	25	-26	15+1	-16	6	-4	3	-6
	FW	(Spain) ESP	Isidro	39	4	14+13	2	2+2	0	5+3	2
	MF	(Spain) ESP	García Hernández	34	5	15+9	3	3+2	1	3+2	1
	FW	(Spain) ESP	Pineda	28	5	12+7	5	4+1	0	3+1	0
	DF	(Spain) ESP	García Navajas	22	0	11+4	0	1+1	0	2+3	0
	GK	(Spain) ESP	García Remón	1	0	0	0	0+1	-0	0	-0
	DF	(Spain) ESP	Sabido	22	0	12+2	0	3	0	5	0
	MF	(Spain) ESP	Carcelén	17	0	5+6	0	0+2	0	0+4	0
	DF	(Spain) ESP	Goyo Benito	9	0	5	0	1	0	2+1	0
	FW	(England) ENG	Cunningham	8	1	2+1	0	3	0	2	1
	DF	(Spain) ESP	Pérez García	0	0	0	0				
	MF	(Spain) ESP	Portugal	0	0	0	0				

- Source: http://www.bdfutbol.com/en/t/t1981-822.html

== See also ==
The Madrid of los Garcia (in Spanish)
