= 1979–80 Real Madrid CF season =

78th season in existence of Real Madrid CF

Real Madrid CF
1979–80 season
- President: Luis de Carlos
- Head coach: Vujadin Boškov
- Stadium: Santiago Bernabéu
- La Liga: 1st (in European Cup)
- Copa del Rey: Winners
- European Cup: Semi-finals
- Top goalscorer: League: Santillana (23); All: Santillana (29)
Home colours	Away colours

The 1979–80 season was Real Madrid Club de Fútbol's 78th season in existence and the club's 49th consecutive season in the top flight of Spanish football.

== Summary ==
During summer changes came to the bench, Real Zaragoza's Yugoslavian head coach Vujadin Boškov signed in to replace Luis Molowny as new trainer. After the departure of Danish Forward Henning Jensen to Ajax Amsterdam, the club seek to reinforce the left side, rumours included several players such as René van de Kerkhof from PSV Eindhoven and Rüdiger Abramczik from Schalke 04, however the manager favoured the arrival of Laurie Cunningham who became the first British player to play for the club, the forward was transferred in from West Bromwich Albion. Defender Goyo Benito received La Laureada (The Laureate) from President Luis de Carlos due to his outstanding compromise and playing for the club being only one of two players with that distinction. Other two players reinforced "The Madrid of Los García" such as Perez García from Real Madrid Castilla and Antonio García Navajas from Burgos CF.

In the European Cup, the team reached the semi-finals where it was eliminated by Western German side Hamburg SV. Despite winning 2–0 in Madrid, the squad plummeted in the second leg of the series to lose 1–5. Meanwhile, in the 1979–80 Copa del Rey the squad advanced to the final and won the trophy against its reserve team Real Madrid Castilla 6–1 in front of 65,000 spectators at the Santiago Bernabéu Stadium.

The club clinched its 20th League title which became its third three-peat ever by just one single point above runners-up emerging Real Sociedad after the then-undefeated in last 32 league matches basque side lost its game on round 33 against Sevilla thanks to 2 goals of Daniel Bertoni. Added to its Copa del Rey trophy, the team won its third "Double" ever and their fifth league title in the last six seasons.

== Squad ==
Note: Flags indicate national team as defined under FIFA eligibility rules; some limited exceptions apply. Players may hold more than one non-FIFA nationality.

No.	Pos.	Nation	Player
—	GK	ESP	Mariano García Remón
—	GK	ESP	Miguel Ángel
—	DF	ESP	Isidoro San José
—	DF	ESP	Goyo Benito
—	DF	ESP	Pirri
—	DF	ESP	José Antonio Camacho
—	DF	ESP	Andrés Sabido
—	DF	ESP	Ángel Pérez García
—	DF	ESP	Antonio García Navajas
—	DF	ESP	Herrero
—	MF	ESP	Miguel Ángel Portugal

No.	Pos.	Nation	Player
—	MF	FRG	Uli Stielike
—	MF	ESP	Vicente del Bosque
—	MF	ESP	Angel
—	MF	ESP	Francisco García Hernández
—	FW	ESP	Santillana
—	FW	ESP	Juanito
—	FW	ENG	Laurie Cunningham
—	FW	ARG	Roberto Martínez
—	FW	ESP	Isidro
—	FW	ESP	Hipólito Rincón

=== Transfers ===
In
Pos.	Name	from	Type
FW	Laurie Cunningham	West Bromwich Albion	£950,000
MF	Ángel	UD Salamanca	
MF	Miguel Ángel Portugal	Burgos CF	
DF	Ángel Pérez García	Real Madrid Castilla	–
DF	Antonio García Navajas	Burgos CF	–
DF	Herrero		–

Out
Pos.	Name	To	Type
DF	Juan Sol	Valencia CF	
DF	Enrique Wolff	Argentinos Juniors	
FW	Henning Jensen	AFC Ajax	
FW	Ico Aguilar García	Sporting Gijón	
FW	Carlos Guerini	Talleres de Córdoba	
GK	Maté	Burgos CF	
MF	Vitoria Soria	Burgos CF	
DF	Rafael García Cortés	Burgos CF	

== Competitions ==
=== La Liga ===
==== Position by round ====
Round	1	2	3	4	5	6	7	8	9	10	11	12	13	14	15	16	17	18	19	20	21	22	23	24	25	26	27	28	29	30	31	32	33	34
Ground	H	A	H	A	H	A	A	H	A	H	A	H	A	H	A	H	A	A	H	A	H	A	H	H	A	H	A	H	A	H	A	H	A	H
Result	W	W	W	D	W	W	D	W	L	W	D	W	W	W	D	W	L	L	W	W	W	W	D	W	D	D	D	W	W	W	D	W	W	W
Position	2	2	3	2	2	2	3	2	3	1	2	1	1	1	1	1	1	2	2	1	1	1	1	1	1	1	2	2	1	1	2	2	1	1

Source: www.lfp.es
A = Away; H = Home; W = Win; D = Draw; L = Loss; = 1980-81 European Cup; = 1980-81 UEFA Cup

==== League table ====
Pos	Team	Pld	W	D	L	GF	GA	GD	Pts	Qualification or relegation
1	Real Madrid (C)	34	22	9	3	70	33	+37	53	Qualification for the European Cup first round
2	Real Sociedad	34	19	14	1	54	20	+34	52	Qualification for the UEFA Cup first round
3	Sporting Gijón	34	16	7	11	47	34	+13	39	Qualification for the UEFA Cup first round
4	Barcelona	34	13	12	9	42	33	+9	38	Qualification for the UEFA Cup first round
5	Real Betis	34	12	12	10	42	40	+2	36	

Source: BDFútbol
Rules for classification: 1) Points; 2) Head-to-head results; 3) Goal difference; 4) Number of goals scored
(C) Champions

==== Matches ====
9 September 1979 1	Real Madrid	3–1	Valencia CF	Madrid
	Cunningham 39'; Cunnigham 63'; Santillana 72'; Angel (yellow card)	Report	Sura 28'; Tendillo (yellow card); Aryas (yellow card)	Stadium: Estadio Santiago Bernabéu; Referee: Ernesto Nunez

16 September 1979 2	Rayo Vallecano	1–2	Real Madrid	Madrid
	Robles 40'; Ukeda (yellow card)	Report	Santillana 51'; Stielike 62'; Juanito (yellow card)	Stadium: Vallecas; Referee: Antonio Palanquez

23 September 1979 3	Real Madrid	3–2	FC Barcelona	Madrid
	Santillana 6'; Juanito 8'; Cunningham 32'; Stielike 45'; Pirri (yellow card)	Report	Landaburu 23'; Krankl 36'	Stadium: Estadio Santiago Bernabéu; Referee: García Carrión

30 September 1979 4	AD Almería	1–1	Real Madrid	Almería
	Arias 35'; Garay (yellow card); Piñero (yellow card)	Report	31' Santillana; (yellow card) Angel	Stadium: Juan Rojas; Referee: Benito Uris

14 October 1979 5	Real Madrid	3–2	Real Zaragoza	Madrid
	Stielike 24'; Rincon 63'; Rincon 83'; Pirri (yellow card)	Report	35' Valdano; 62' Valdano; (yellow card) Muñoz; (yellow card) Lasa; (yellow card) India	Stadium: Estadio Santiago Bernabéu; Referee: Jose Perez

21 October 1979 6	Real Betis	2–3	Real Madrid	Sevilla
	Vilalba 78'; Benitez 89'	Report	Martinez 36'; Stielike 44'; Santillana 75'	Stadium: Estadio Benito Villamarin; Referee: Emilio Muro

28 October 1979 7	Español	0–0	Real Madrid	Barcelona
	Fortes (yellow card); Amarillo (yellow card)	Report	(yellow card) Juanito	Stadium: Estadio Sarriá; Referee: Jose Gonzalez

30 October 1979 8	Real Madrid	2–0	UD Salamanca	Madrid
	Santillana 72'; Martinez 76'; Sabido (yellow card)	Report	Tome (yellow card); Bustillo (yellow card); Juanito (red card) 75'	Stadium: Estadio Santiago Bernabéu; Referee: Victoriano Arminio

11 November 1979 9	Real Sociedad	4–0	Real Madrid	San Sebastián
	Ufarte 14' (pen.); Satrustegui 36'; Zamora 61'; Burgos 75'	Report	(red card) 49' Del Bosque	Stadium: Atotxa; Referee: Manuel Hernandez

18 November 1979 10	Real Madrid	5–0	Hércules CF	Madrid
	Santillana 1'; Santillana 22'; Hernandez 19'; Pirri 69'; Cunningham 81'	Report	Giuliano (yellow card)	Stadium: Estadio Santiago Bernabéu; Referee: Manuel Marquenda

25 November 1979 11	Sporting Gijón	1–1	Real Madrid	Gijón
	Ferrero (red card) 7'; Joaquin 50'; Uriah (yellow card); Abel (yellow card)	Report	31' (o.g.) Quini; (yellow card) Juanito; (yellow card) Benito	Stadium: Estadio El Molinero; Referee: Jesus Sanz

4 December 1979 12	Real Madrid	2–1	Burgos CF	Madrid
	Juanito 6'; Santillana 37'; Stielike (yellow card)	Report	Pascal 65'; Gomez (yellow card)	Stadium: Estadio Santiago Bernabéu; Referee: Jose Negreira

16 December 1979 13	CD Málaga	1–4	Real Madrid	Málaga
	Portela 11'; Carlos (yellow card); Macias (yellow card); Megido (yellow card)	Report	Santillana 22'; Cunningham 74'; Angel 79'; Stielike 89'	Stadium: Estadio La Rosaleda; Referee: Juan Pezon

30 December 1979 14	Real Madrid	2–0	Sevilla CF	Madrid
	Martinez 40'; Stielike 69'	Report	Bertoni (yellow card); Biri (yellow card); Juanito (yellow card) 53' (yellow-red card)	Stadium: Estadio Santiago Bernabéu; Referee: Luis Gonzalez

6 January 1980 15	Atlético Madrid	1–1	Real Madrid	Madrid
	Cano 74' (pen.); Guzman (yellow card); Pereira (yellow card)	Report	Juanito 71'; Camacho (yellow card)	Stadium: Estadio Vicente Calderón; Referee: Antonio Palanquez

13 January 1980 16	Real Madrid	3–1	UD Las Palmas	Madrid
	Juanito 33'; Juanito 40'; Juanito 56'; Sabido (yellow card); Santillana (yellow card)	Report	Noli 89' (yellow card); Huani (yellow card)	Stadium: Estadio Santiago Bernabéu; Referee: Ildefonso Azpitarte

20 January 1980 17	Athletic Bilbao	3–0	Real Madrid	Bilbao
	Dani 43'; Ruiz 59'; Sarabia 86'	Report	(yellow card) Camacho	Stadium: San Mamés; Referee: Jose Carrion

27 January 1980 18	Valencia CF	2–0	Real Madrid	Valencia
	Kempes 17'; Villarroda 82'	Report	(yellow card) Del Bosque; (yellow card) Angel	Stadium: Estadio Mestalla; Referee: Jose Gonzalez

3 February 1980 19	Real Madrid	7–0	Rayo Vallecano	Madrid
	Santillana 8'; Santillana 75'; Juanito 9'; Cunningham 19'; Hernandez 28'; Martinez 52'; Portugal 58'	Report		Stadium: Estadio Santiago Bernabéu; Referee: Fernando Alvarez

10 February 1980 20	FC Barcelona	0–2	Real Madrid	Barcelona
	Zuviría (yellow card)	Report	Francisco García Hernández 61'; Santillana 63'; Goyo Benito (yellow card); Pirri (yellow card)	Stadium: Camp Nou; Referee: Fandos Hernández

17 February 1980 21	Real Madrid	4–1	AD Almería	Madrid
	Juanito 6' (yellow card); Hernandez 37'; Angel 59' (yellow card); Cunningham 89'	Report	Lopez 75'; Aryas (yellow card); Lobato (yellow card)	Stadium: Estadio Santiago Bernabéu; Referee: Joaquin Marcos

24 February 1980 22	Real Zaragoza	0–1	Real Madrid	Zaragoza
	Gerry (yellow card); Oñadera (yellow card)	Report	Santillana 87'; Del Bosque (yellow card); Stielike (yellow card)	Stadium: Estadio La Romareda; Referee: Jose Negreira

26 February 1980 23	Real Madrid	1–1	Real Betis	Madrid
	Hernandez 65'	Report	28' (o.g.) Sabido; (yellow card) Moran; (yellow card) Perena	Stadium: Estadio Santiago Bernabéu; Referee: Emilio Muro

9 March 1980 24	Real Madrid	2–0	Español	Madrid
	Santillana 33'; Cunningham 47'	Report		Stadium: Estadio Santiago Bernabéu; Referee: Victoriano Arminio

16 March 1980 25	UD Salamanca	1–1	Real Madrid	Villares de la Reina
	Juanito 35'; Enrique (yellow card)	Report	Benito 79'; Stielike (yellow card)	Stadium: Estadio Helmántico; Referee: Benito Uris

23 March 1980 26	Real Madrid	2–2	Real Sociedad	Madrid
	Hernandez 85'; Juanito 89' (yellow card) 89' (yellow-red card); Benito (yellow card); Remon (yellow card)	Report	Zamora 40'; Alonso 45'; Satrustegui (yellow card); Garate (yellow card); Arconada (yellow card); Gorritz (red card) 89'	Stadium: Estadio Santiago Bernabéu; Referee: Jose Carrion

30 March 1980 27	Hércules CF	0–0	Real Madrid	Alicante
	Hervas (yellow card); Arasil (yellow card); Charles (yellow card) 89' (yellow-red card)	Report	Camacho (yellow card) 76' (yellow-red card); Rincon (yellow card); Santillana (yellow card); Remon (yellow card); Hernandez (yellow card) 89' (yellow-red card)	Stadium: Estadio José Rico Perez; Referee: Jose Perez

5 April 1980 28	Real Madrid	1–0	Sporting Gijón	Madrid
	Santillana 80'; Perez (yellow card)	Report	Uriah (yellow card); Doria (yellow card)	Stadium: Estadio Santiago Bernabéu; Referee: Jose Negreira

13 April 1980 29	Burgos CF	1–2	Real Madrid	Burgos
	Careño 21'; Blush (yellow card)	Report	60' Santillana; 86' Santillana; (yellow card) Camacho	Stadium: El Plantío; Referee: Jose Perez

19 April 1980 30	Real Madrid	2–1	CD Málaga	Madrid
	Santillana 28'; Santillana 35'; Sabido (yellow card)	Report	Megido 59'; Perez (yellow card); Miguel (yellow card); Megido (yellow card)	Stadium: Estadio Santiago Bernabéu; Referee: Felipe Aurre

27 April 1980 31	Sevilla CF	1–1	Real Madrid	Sevilla
	Alvarez (red card) 55'; Yuyu 60'; Alvarez (yellow card); Scott (yellow card)	Report	10' Gonzalez; (yellow card) Hernandez	Stadium: Estadio Santiago Bernabéu; Referee: Antonio Palanquez

4 May 1980 32	Real Madrid	4–0	Atlético Madrid	Madrid
	Santillana 51' (yellow card); Arteche 64' (o.g.); Martinez 65'; Sierra 89' (o.g.); Stielike (yellow card)	Report	(yellow card) Guzman; (yellow card) Bermejo	Stadium: Estadio Santiago Bernabéu; Referee: Jose Gonzalez

11 May 1980 33	UD Las Palmas	1–2	Real Madrid	Las Palmas de Gran Canaria
	Morete 43'	Report	50' Santillana; 67' Santillana; (yellow card) Sabido	Stadium: Estadio Insular; Referee: Joaquin Marcos

18 May 1980 34	Real Madrid	3–1	Athletic Bilbao	Madrid
	Angel 23'; Juanito 51' (yellow card); Pirri 72' (pen.); Benito (yellow card)	Report	Dani 64' (pen.); Goykochea (yellow card)	Stadium: Estadio Santiago Bernabéu; Referee: Benito Uris

=== Copa del Rey ===
==== Final ====
4 June 1980	Real Madrid	6–1	Castilla	Madrid
20:30 CET	Juanito 20', 89'; Santillana 42'; Sabido 59'; Del Bosque 62'; García Hernández 82'	Report (in Spanish)	Álvarez 80'	Stadium: Santiago Bernabéu Stadium; Attendance: 65,000; Referee: Ángel Franco Martínez

=== European Cup ===
==== First round ====
19 September 1979	Levski-Spartak (Bulgaria)	0–1	(Spain) Real Madrid	Sofia
		Report	Martínez 26'	Stadium: Vasil Levski National Stadium; Attendance: 37,000; Referee: (Austria) Horst Brummeier

3 October 1979	Real Madrid (Spain)	2–0	(Bulgaria) Levski-Spartak	Madrid
	Del Bosque 20'; Cunningham 32' (pen.)	Report		Stadium: Estadio Santiago Bernabéu; Attendance: 40,000; Referee: (Belgium) Francis Rion

==== Round of 16 ====
24 October 1979	Porto (Portugal)	2–1	(Spain) Real Madrid	Porto
	Gomes 35', 40' (pen.)	Report	Cunningham 52'	Stadium: Estádio das Antas, Attendance: 55,000; Referee: (France) Michel Vautrot

7 November 1979	Real Madrid (Spain)	1–0	(Portugal) Porto	Madrid
	Benito 71'	Report		Stadium: Estadio Santiago Bernabéu, Attendance: 115,000; Referee: (Romania) Nicolae Rainea

==== Quarter-finals ====
5 March 1980	Celtic (Scotland)	2–0	(Spain) Real Madrid	Glasgow
	McCluskey 52'; Doyle 75'	Report		Stadium: Celtic Park; Attendance: 67,000; Referee: (Italy) Riccardo Lattanzi

19 March 1980	Real Madrid (Spain)	3–0	(Scotland) Celtic	Madrid
	Santillana 45'; Stielike 56'; Juanito 86'	Report		Stadium: Estadio Santiago Bernabéu; Attendance: 110,000; Referee: (Hungary) Károly Palotai

==== Semi-finals ====
9 April 1980	Real Madrid (Spain)	2–0	(West Germany) Hamburger SV	Madrid
	Santillana 67'; Santillana 80'	Report		Stadium: Estadio Santiago Bernabéu; Attendance: 121,106; Referee: (Czech Republic) Vojtěch Christov

23 April 1980	Hamburger SV (West Germany)	5–1	(Spain) Real Madrid	Hamburg
	Kaltz 10' (pen.), 40'; Hrubesch 17', 45'; Memering 90'	Report	Cunningham 31'	Stadium: Volksparkstadion; Attendance: 61,980; Referee: (Italy) Alberto Michelotti

== Statistics ==
=== Players statistics ===
No.	Pos	Nat	Player	Total		Primera Division		Copa del Rey		European Cup	
No.	Pos	Nat	Player	Apps	Goals	Apps	Goals	Apps	Goals	Apps	Goals
	GK	(Spain) ESP	García Remón	44	-41	33	-32	2+1	-3	8	-6
	DF	(Spain) ESP	San José	23	0	19	0	0	0	4	0
	DF	(Spain) ESP	Goyo Benito	37	2	24+3	1	3	0	7	1
	DF	(Spain) ESP	Pirri	36	2	27	2	4	0	5	0
	DF	(Spain) ESP	Camacho	44	0	33	0	3	0	8	0
	MF	(West Germany) FRG	Stielike	46	6	31	5	7	0	8	1
	MF	(Spain) ESP	Del Bosque	46	2	32	0	6	1	8	1
	MF	(Spain) ESP	Ángel	47	3	32	3	5+2	0	8	0
	FW	(Spain) ESP	Juanito	41	15	31	10	6	4	4	1
	FW	(Spain) ESP	Santillana	47	29	33	23	6	3	8	3
	FW	(England) ENG	Cunningham	41	12	29	8	4+1	1	7	3
	GK	(Spain) ESP	Miguel Ángel	7	-7	1	-1	5	-3	1	-3
	DF	(Spain) ESP	Sabido	32	1	15+4	0	6+1	1	4+2	0
	MF	(Spain) ESP	García Hernández	30	8	10+12	7	2+2	1	1+3	0
	FW	(Argentina) ARG	Martínez	35	6	6+16	5	4+2	0	3+4	1
	FW	(Spain) ESP	Isidro	17	2	9+1	1	6	1	0+1	0
	FW	(Spain) ESP	Rincón	13	5	2+6	2	3+2	3		
	MF	(Spain) ESP	Portugal	11	1	1+7	1	2	0	0+1	0
	DF	(Spain) ESP	Pérez García	11	0	3+2	0	3+1	0	2	0
	DF	(Spain) ESP	García Navajas	9	0	3+2	0	0	0	3+1	0
	DF	(Spain) ESP	Herrero	0	0	0	0				

- Source: http://www.bdfutbol.com/en/t/t1979-802.html

== See also ==
The Madrid of los Garcia (in Spanish)
