= 1980–81 Real Madrid CF season =

79th season in existence of Real Madrid CF

Real Madrid CF
1980–81 season
- President: Luis de Carlos
- Head coach: Vujadin Boškov
- Stadium: Santiago Bernabéu
- La Liga: 2nd (in UEFA Cup)
- Copa del Rey: Quarter-finals
- European Cup: Runners-up
- Top goalscorer: Juanito (19)
Home colours	Away colours	Third colours

The 1980–81 season is Real Madrid Club de Fútbol's 79th season in existence and the club's 50th consecutive season in the top flight of Spanish football. As of 2024, this was the last time Real Madrid had lost a European Cup/UEFA Champions League final as they have gone on to win all 9 finals since 1998 and avenging their defeat to Liverpool both times in 2018 and 2022.

== Summary ==
Financial worries did hit Luis de Carlos Presidency during summer as a result there had not high-profile transfers in, so, the new arrivals were midfielder Ricardo Gallego (replacing forward Laurie Cunningham injured since November and with physical issues until season finale) goalkeeper Agustín come from its Youth team Castilla and ended loans like Rafael García Cortés. In League the squad was struggling in the middle of the table almost the entire campaign behind local rivals Atlético Madrid until colchoneros collapsed in the final rounds of the tournament and Real Sociedad grabbed the first spot tied in points with Real Madrid but the head-to head matches was in favor of basque side winning its first title ever. In Copa del Rey the club was eliminated in Quarterfinals by Sporting Gijón with an 3–4 aggregate score.

The season is best remembered due to the club's journey around the European Cup defeating Irish side Limerick in First Round, in Eightfinals won 3–0 against Budapest Honved, advancing 2–0 against Soviet side Spartak Moscow in Quarterfinals and won the series 2–1 in semi-finals against Italian Champion F.C. Internazionale Milano reaching its first Final of the tournament after 15 years. Before the final, President Luis de Carlos reached an agreement with a German supplier being the first time ever the club play with a branded shirt openly. However, with Stielike and Cunningham having physical issues the squad lost 0–1 the Final against then-heavily favourites English side Liverpool F.C. recent back-to-back champions in 1977 and 1978.

According to Junior the club made him an offer after the 1980 World Champions' Gold Cup rejected by the Brazilian left-back Defender.

== Squad ==
Note: Flags indicate national team as defined under FIFA eligibility rules; some limited exceptions apply. Players may hold more than one non-FIFA nationality.

No.	Pos.	Nation	Player
—	GK	ESP	García Remón
—	DF	ESP	García Cortés
—	DF	ESP	Andrés Sabido
—	DF	ESP	García Navajas
—	DF	ESP	José Antonio Camacho
—	MF	FRG	Uli Stielike
—	MF	ESP	Ángel
—	MF	ESP	Vicente del Bosque
—	MF	ESP	Ricardo Gallego
—	FW	ESP	Santillana
—	FW	ESP	Juanito

No.	Pos.	Nation	Player
—	GK	ESP	Agustín
—	FW	ESP	Isidro
—	MF	ESP	García Hernández
—	FW	ESP	Pineda García
—	FW	ENG	Laurie Cunningham
—	GK	ESP	Miguel Ángel
—	DF	ESP	Goyo Benito
—	DF	ESP	Pérez García
—	FW	ESP	Rincón
—	MF	ESP	Miguel Ángel Portugal
—	DF	ESP	San José

=== Transfers ===
In
Pos.	Name	from	Type
DF	Rafael García Cortés	Burgos CF	
MF	Ricardo Gallego	Castilla	
GK	Agustín Rodríguez Santiago	Castilla	
FW	Pineda García	Castilla	

Out
Pos.	Name	To	Type
MF	Pirri	Puebla F.C.	
FW	Roberto Martínez	Español	
DF	Herrero	Castilla	

== Competitions ==
=== La Liga ===
==== Position by round ====
Round	1	2	3	4	5	6	7	8	9	10	11	12	13	14	15	16	17	18	19	20	21	22	23	24	25	26	27	28	29	30	31	32	33	34
Ground	A	H	A	H	A	H	A	H	A	H	A	H	A	H	A	A	H	H	A	H	A	H	A	H	A	H	A	H	A	H	A	H	H	A
Result	W	W	L	W	L	W	L	W	L	W	D	W	L	W	D	L	D	W	D	W	D	L	L	W	W	W	L	W	W	W	W	W	W	W
Position	5	1	4	2	6	4	6	3	9	4	5	3	7	4	6	7	6	5	5	5	5	5	8	6	5	4	6	4	4	3	3	2	2	2

Source: www.lfp.es
A = Away; H = Home; W = Win; D = Draw; L = Loss; = 1981–82 European Cup; = 1981–82 UEFA Cup

==== League table ====
Pos	Team	Pld	W	D	L	GF	GA	GD	Pts	Qualification or relegation
1	Real Sociedad (C)	34	19	7	8	52	29	+23	45 (Note: Real Sociedad finished ahead of Real Madrid on head-to-head goal-difference: Real Madrid 1-0 Real Sociedad, Real Sociedad 3-1 Real Madrid.)	Qualification for the European Cup first round
2	Real Madrid	34	20	5	9	66	37	+29	45	Qualification for the UEFA Cup first round
3	Atlético Madrid	34	17	8	9	59	41	+18	42 (Note: Atlético Madrid finished ahead of Valencia on head-to-head points: Atlético Madrid 3-1 Valencia, Valencia 0-0 Atlético Madrid.)	Qualification for the UEFA Cup first round
4	Valencia	34	16	10	8	46	39	+7	42	Qualification for the UEFA Cup first round
5	Barcelona	34	18	5	11	66	41	+25	41	Qualification for the Cup Winners' Cup first round (Note: Barcelona qualified to the Cup Winners' Cup as winners of the Copa del Rey.)

Source: BDFútbol
Rules for classification: 1) Points; 2) Head-to-head results; 3) Goal difference; 4) Number of goals scored
(C) Champions

==== Matches ====
7 September 1980 1	AD Almería	1–2	Real Madrid	Almería
	Roll 37'	Report	25' Hernandez; 32' Cunningham; (yellow card) Angel; (yellow card) Stielike	Stadium: Juan Rojas; Referee: Jose Negreira

14 September 1980 2	Real Madrid	7–1	Athletic Bilbao	Madrid
	Hernandez 17'; Hernandez 20'; Hernandez 75'; Stielike 24'; Gallego 28'; Cunningham 40'; Gonzalez 86'	Report	26' (pen.) Dani	Stadium: Estadio Santiago Bernabéu; Referee: Jose Carrion

21 September 1980 3	Sevilla CF	2–0	Real Madrid	Seville
	Montero 17'; Yuyu 47'; Morete (yellow card); Alvarez (yellow card)	Report	(yellow card) Juanito; (yellow card) Garcia Remon; (yellow card) Alvarez	Stadium: Estadio Sanchez Pizjuan; Referee: Benito Uris

28 September 1980 4	Real Madrid	4–0	Real Murcia	Madrid
	Hernandez 15' (yellow card); Juanito 25' (pen.); Santillana 27'; Angel 89' (yellow card)	Report	Garcia (yellow card); Ruiz (yellow card)	Stadium: Estadio Santiago Bernabéu; Referee: Juan Oliver

5 October 1980 5	Español	2–1	Real Madrid	Barcelona
	Marañon 43'; Verdugo 88'; Morel (yellow card); Huertas (yellow card)	Report	Juanito (yellow card) 57' (yellow-red card); Del Bosque 72' (yellow card)	Stadium: Estadio Sarriá; Referee: Ildefonso Azpitare

12 October 1980 6	Real Madrid	1–0	Sporting Gijón	Madrid
	Cunningham 70'	Report		Stadium: Estadio Santiago Bernabéu; Referee: Victoriano Arminio

18 October 1980 7	Valencia CF	2–1	Real Madrid	Valencia
	Kempes 28'; Kempes 81'; Botubo (red card) 78'	Report	Rincon (red card) 78' Cunningham 89'	Stadium: Estadio Mestalla; Referee: Manuel Markenda

26 October 1980 8	Real Madrid	3–1	Osasuna	Madrid
	Cunningham 3' Hernandez 56' Lucumbury 89' (o.g.) Sabido (yellow card)	Report	Irigibel 28' (yellow card)	Stadium: Estadio Santiago Bernabéu; Referee: Manuel Hernandez

1 November 1980 9	UD Las Palmas	1–0	Real Madrid	Las Palmas de Gran Canaria
	Juani 32' Paez (yellow card) Fernandez (yellow card)	Report	Gonzalez (yellow card)	Stadium: Estadio Insular; Referee: Joaquin Marcos

9 November 1980 10	Real Madrid	1–0	Real Sociedad	Madrid
	Santillana 58' Del Bosque (yellow card) 72' (yellow-red card) Angel (yellow card)	Report	(yellow card) Satrustegi	Stadium: Estadio Santiago Bernabéu; Referee: Jose Negreira

16 November 1980 11	Real Betis	1–1	Real Madrid	Seville
	Moran 18'	Report	Santillana 19' Gonzalez (yellow card) Pineda (yellow card) Hernandez (yellow card)	Stadium: Estadio Benito Villamarin; Referee: Jesus Sanz

23 November 1980 12	Real Madrid	3–0	Hércules CF	Madrid
	Pineda 28', 39' Santillana 70' Sabido (yellow card)	Report	Megido (yellow card) Serrat (yellow card)	Stadium: Estadio Santiago Bernabéu; Referee: Joaquin Velazquez

30 November 1980 13	FC Barcelona	2–1	Real Madrid	Barcelona
	Schuster 15'; Quini 64'; Ramos (yellow card)	Report	Juanito 22'; García Hernandez (yellow card)	Stadium: Camp Nou; Referee: García Carrión

7 December 1980 14	Real Madrid	2–0	UD Salamanca	Madrid
	Hernandez 70' Juanito 76' (pen.)	Report	Tome (yellow card)	Stadium: Estadio Santiago Bernabéu; Referee: Emilio Muro

14 December 1980 15	Real Zaragoza	0–0	Real Madrid	Zaragoza
		Report	Stielike (yellow card)	Stadium: La Romareda; Referee: Jose Gonzalez

21 December 1980 16	Atlético Madrid	3–1	Real Madrid	Madrid
	Ramos 44' Kano 67' (yellow card) Dirceu 69' (pen.)	Report	Juanito 37' Stylish (yellow card) Perez (yellow card)	Stadium: Estadio Vicente Calderón; Referee: Victoriano Arminio

28 December 1980 17	Real Madrid	1–1	Real Valladolid	Madrid
	Juanito 66' (pen.) Gallego (yellow card) Camacho (yellow card)	Report	Alonso 52' Ruski (yellow card)	Stadium: Estadio Santiago Bernabéu; Referee: Sebastian Rendon

4 January 1981 18	Real Madrid	4–0	AD Almería	Madrid
	Juanito 19' (pen.); Juanito 75' (pen.) Rincon 39' Cortez 63' Gallego (yellow card)	Report	Blanco (yellow card) Martinez (yellow card) Removed 44 minutes 44 '	Stadium: Estadio Santiago Bernabéu; Referee: Benito Uris

11 January 1981 19	Athletic Bilbao	1–1	Real Madrid	Bilbao
	Sabido 5' (o.g.)	Report	Juanito 39' (pen.)	Stadium: San Mamés; Referee: Jose Carrion

18 January 1981 20	Real Madrid	3–2	Sevilla CF	Madrid
	Juanito 24'; Juanito 46' Santillana 75' Rincon Warned	Report	Montero 61' Blanco 85' Nimo (yellow card) Buyo (yellow card)	Stadium: Estadio Santiago Bernabéu; Referee: Jose Negreira

25 January 1981 21	Real Murcia	1–1	Real Madrid	Murcia
	Gil 49' Naharro (yellow card)	Report	Santillana 68'	Stadium: La Condomina; Referee: Jose Perez

1 February 1981 22	Real Madrid	1–2	Español	Madrid
	Juanito 40' (pen.) Santillana (yellow card)	Report	Urbano 18' Marañon 51' Verdugo (yellow card) Vilches (yellow card)	Stadium: Estadio Bernabeu; Referee: Bartolome Morro

8 February 1981 23	Sporting Gijón	4–0	Real Madrid	Gijón
	Abel 34'; Abel 63' Mesa 59' Ferrero 65'	Report	Stielike (yellow card)	Stadium: El Molinón; Referee: Sebastian Rendon

9 March 1981 24	Real Madrid	2–1	Valencia CF	Madrid
	Juanito 24' Santillana 25' Stielike (yellow card) Gallego (yellow card) Sabido (yellow card) Del Bosque (red card) 65'	Report	Kempes 31' (pen.) Castelanos (yellow card) Solsona (yellow card) Tendillo (yellow card)	Stadium: Estadio Santiago Bernabéu; Referee: Manuel Marquenda

22 February 1981 25	Osasuna	1–2	Real Madrid	Pamplona
	Irigibel 30' (yellow card)	Report	Pineda 43' Hernandez 55' Sabido (yellow card)	Stadium: Estadio El Sadar; Referee: Emilio Muro

28 February 1981 26	Real Madrid	3–0	UD Las Palmas	Madrid
	Santillana 11'; Santillana 69' (yellow card); Juanito 22'; Stielike (yellow card)	Report	Juan (yellow card); Suarez (yellow card); Estevez (yellow card)	Stadium: Estadio Santiago Bernabéu; Referee: Felipe Aurre

8 March 1981 27	Real Sociedad	3–1	Real Madrid	San Sebastián
	Alvarez 9'; Alonso 58'; Zamora 69'; Uralde (yellow card); Cortabarria (yellow card); Zelayeta (yellow card)	Report	Hernandez 25'; Camacho (yellow card); Angel (yellow card); Remon (yellow card); Sabido (yellow card)	Stadium: Atotxa; Referee: Jose Negreira

15 March 1981 28	Real Madrid	4–2	Real Betis	Madrid
	Stielike 71'; Stielike 76'; Pineda 75'; Hernandez 83'	Report	Moran 12'; Lopez 23' (yellow card); Ortega (yellow card); Cardeñosa (yellow card)	Stadium: Estadio Santiago Bernabéu; Referee: Ildefonso Azpitare

22 March 1981 29	Hércules CF	1–2	Real Madrid	Alicante
	Baena 39'; Vidal (yellow card); Kustudic (yellow card); Lobregat (yellow card); Carselen (red card) 88'	Report	7' Juanito; 78' Juanito; (yellow card) Angel	Stadium: Estadio José Rico Pérez; Referee: Sebastian Rendon

29 March 1981 30	Real Madrid	3–0	FC Barcelona	Madrid
	Juanito 53' (pen.); Santillana 71'; Stielike 76'	Report	Estella 17'; Schuster (yellow card); Simonsen (yellow card)	Stadium: Estadio Santiago Bernabéu

27 April 1981 31	UD Salamanca	1–3	Real Madrid	Villares de la Reina
	Corominas 30'	Report	32' (pen.) Juanito; 39' Juanito; 89' Juanito	Stadium: El Helmántico; Referee: Antonio del Barrio

12 April 1981 32	Real Madrid	2–0	Real Zaragoza	Madrid
	Del Bosque 17'; Hernandez 36'; Juanito (yellow card); Angel (red card) 81'	Report	Guerry (yellow card) 84' (yellow-red card); Kasahus (yellow card)	Stadium: Estadio Santiago Bernabéu; Referee: Juan Oliver

19 April 1981 33	Real Madrid	2–0	Atlético Madrid	Madrid
	Santillana 16'; Hernandez 65'; Camacho (yellow card)	Report	Fragus (yellow card); Prieto (yellow card)	Stadium: Estadio Santiago Bernabéu; Referee: Ildefonso Azpitare

26 April 1981 34	Real Valladolid	1–3	Real Madrid	Valladolid
	Mar 57'	Report	43' Santillana; 72' Santillana; 84' Stielike	Stadium: Estadio José Zorrilla; Referee: Jose Perez

=== Copa del Rey ===
==== Round of 16 ====
30 April 1981 34	Recreativo Huelva	1–1	Real Madrid	Huelva

6 May1981 34	Real Madrid	4–1	Recreativo Huelva	Madrid
				Stadium: Estadio Santiago Bernabéu

==== Quarter-finals ====
30 April 1981	Sporting Gijón	1–1	Real Madrid	Gijón
				Stadium: Estadio El Molinon

31 May 1981	Real Madrid	2–3	Sporting Gijón	Madrid
				Stadium: Estadio Santiago Bernabéu

=== European Cup ===
==== First round ====
17 September 1980 1	Limerick (Republic of Ireland)	1–2	(Spain) Real Madrid	Dublin
	Kennedy 51'	Report	Juanito 71' (pen.); Pineda 85'	Stadium: Lansdowne Road; Attendance: 7,000; Referee: (Denmark) Ole Amundsen

1 October 1980 2	Real Madrid (Spain)	5–1	(Republic of Ireland) Limerick	Madrid
	Santillana 15'; Juanito 31'; De Los Santos 69'; Cunningham 71'; Pineda 83'	Report	Kennedy 43'	Stadium: Santiago Bernabéu Stadium; Attendance: 30,000; Referee: (Portugal) Augusto Marques Pires

==== Eightfinals ====
22 October 1980 1	Real Madrid (Spain)	1–0	(Hungary) Budapest Honvéd	Madrid
	Santillana 22'	Report		Stadium: Santiago Bernabeu Stadium; Attendance: 25,000; Referee: (Republic of Ireland) Eamonn Farrell

4 November 1980 2	Budapest Honvéd (Hungary)	0–2	(Spain) Real Madrid	Budapest
		Report	Cunningham 26'; García Hernández 82'	Stadium: Népstadion; Attendance: 15,000; Referee: (West Germany) Jan Redelfs

==== Quarter-finals ====
4 March 1981 1	Spartak Moscow (Soviet Union)	0–0	(Spain) Real Madrid	Tbilisi
		Report		Stadium: Vladimir Lenin Stadium; Attendance: 80,000; Referee: (Austria) Josef Bucek

19 March 1981 2	Real Madrid (Spain)	2–0	(Soviet Union) Spartak Moscow	Madrid
	Isidro 70', 80'	Report		Stadium: Estadio Santiago Bernabéu; Attendance: 80,000; Referee: (Italy) Gianfranco Menegali

==== Semi-finals ====
8 April 1981 1	Real Madrid (Spain)	2–0	(Italy) Internazionale	Madrid
	Santillana 29'; Juanito 47'	Report		Stadium: Estadio Santiago Bernabéu; Attendance: 80,000; Referee: (Netherlands) Charles Corver

22 April 1981 2	Internazionale (Italy)	1–0	(Spain) Real Madrid	Milan
	Bini 57'	Report		Stadium: Giuseppe Meazza; Attendance: 80,000; Referee: (Belgium) Alexis Ponnet

==== Final ====
27 May 1981	Real Madrid (Spain)	0–1	(England) Liverpool	Paris
20:15 CEST		Report	A. Kennedy 82'	Stadium: Parc des Princes; Attendance: 48,360; Referee: (Hungary) Károly Palotai

== Statistics ==
=== Players statistics ===
No.	Pos	Nat	Player	Total		Primera Division		Copa del Rey		European Cup	
No.	Pos	Nat	Player	Apps	Goals	Apps	Goals	Apps	Goals	Apps	Goals
	GK	(Spain) ESP	García Remón	36	-36	31	-35	0	0	5	-1
	DF	(Spain) ESP	García Cortés	33	1	21+4	1	2+2	0	3+1	0
	DF	(Spain) ESP	Sabido	34	1	21+2	0	4	1	6+1	0
	DF	(Spain) ESP	García Navajas	26	1	14+2	0	4	1	4+2	0
	DF	(Spain) ESP	Camacho	47	0	34	0	4	0	9	0
	MF	(West Germany) FRG	Stielike	41	6	29	5	2+1	1	9	0
	MF	(Spain) ESP	Del Bosque	37	2	28+1	2	3	0	4+1	0
	MF	(Spain) ESP	Gallego	31	1	24+2	1	0	0	5	0
	MF	(Spain) ESP	Ángel	44	2	28+3	1	4	0	9	1
	FW	(Spain) ESP	Santillana	43	17	31	13	4	1	8	3
	FW	(Spain) ESP	Juanito	46	24	33	19	4	2	9	3
	GK	(Spain) ESP	Agustín	11	-10	3+1	-2	4	-6	3	-2
	FW	(Spain) ESP	Isidro	38	4	15+12	1	4	1	6+1	2
	MF	(Spain) ESP	García Hernández	34	13	17+7	12	2	0	6+2	1
	FW	(Spain) ESP	Pineda Garcia	29	7	11+6	4	0+3	1	3+6	2
	FW	(England) ENG	Cunningham	17	7	12	5	0	0	5	2
	GK	(Spain) ESP	Miguel Ángel	3	-1	0+2	0	0	0	1	-1
	DF	(Spain) ESP	Goyo Benito	14	0	9+2	0	0	0	3	0
	DF	(Spain) ESP	Pérez García	13	0	7+3	0	0	0	1+2	0
	FW	(Spain) ESP	Rincón	8	1	4+4	1	0	0	0	0
	MF	(Spain) ESP	Portugal	7	0	2+5	0	0	0	0	0
	DF	(Spain) ESP	San José	5	0	0+1	0	3+1	0	0	0

- Source: https://www.bdfutbol.com/en/t/t1980-812.html

== See also ==
The Madrid of los Garcia (in Spanish)
