= 1981 European Cup final =

- Match programme cover
- Event: 1980–81 European Cup
Real Madrid	Liverpool
(Spain)	(England)
0	1
- Date: 27 May 1981
- Venue: Parc des Princes, Paris
- Referee: Károly Palotai (Hungary)
- Attendance: 48,360

The 1981 European Cup final was an association football match between Real Madrid of Spain and Liverpool of England on 27 May 1981 at the Parc des Princes, Paris, France. It was the final match of the 1980–81 season of Europe's premier cup competition, the European Cup. Real Madrid were appearing in their ninth final, they had previously won the competition six times and lost twice. Liverpool were appearing in their third final, after two appearances in 1977 and 1978.

Each club needed to progress through four rounds to reach the final. Matches were contested over two legs, with a match at each team's home ground. Real Madrid's matches ranged from close affairs to comfortable victories. In the first round they beat Limerick 7–2 on aggregate, but their final two ties were won by at least two goals. All but one of Liverpool's ties were comfortable victories; they beat Bayern Munich on the away goals rule, while they won all their other ties by at least five goals.

Watched by a crowd of 48,360, the first half was goalless. Liverpool took the lead in the second half when Alan Kennedy scored. They held this lead to win the match 1–0, securing Liverpool's third European Cup and a fifth consecutive victory by an English team. Liverpool manager Bob Paisley became the first manager to win the competition three times. As of 2024, this is Real Madrid's most recent loss in a European Cup/UEFA Champions League final as they would go on to win in each of their nine subsequent final appearances.

== Route to the final ==
=== Real Madrid ===
Round	Opponents	First leg	Second leg	Aggregate score
1st	Limerick	2–1 (a)	5–1 (h)	7–2
2nd	Honvéd	1–0 (h)	2–0 (a)	3–0
Quarter-finals	Spartak Moscow	0–0 (a)	2–0 (h)	2–0
Semi-finals	Internazionale	2–0 (h)	0–1 (a)	2–1

Real Madrid gained entry to the competition as Spanish champions, after they won the 1979–80 La Liga. Their opponents in the first round were Irish champions Limerick. Limerick took the lead in the first leg at Lansdowne Road, but Real scored twice to win the first leg 2–1. The second leg at Real's home ground, the Santiago Bernabéu Stadium, ended in a 5–1 victory for Real, they won the tie 7–2 on aggregate.

Their opponents in the second round were Hungarian champions Honvéd. A goal from Santillana ensured Real won the first leg 1–0 in Spain. Two goals from Laurie Cunningham and Francisco García Hernández secured a 2–0 victory in the second leg at Honvéd's home ground the Bozsik József Stadion, thus, winning the tie 3–0 on aggregate.

In the quarter-finals, Real faced Soviet champions Spartak Moscow. A 0–0 at the Dynamo Lenin Stadium in the Soviet Union left the tie finely balanced heading into the second leg in Spain. Two goals from Isidro in the second half secured a 2–0 victory in the match and over aggregate.

Real's opponents in the semi-finals were Italian champions Internazionale. Real won the first leg 2–0 in Spain after goals from Santillana and Juanito. Internazionale needed to score twice to force the tie into extra-time, however they were only able to score once. They won the second leg 1–0, but Real won the tie 2–1 on aggregate to progress to their ninth final.

=== Liverpool ===
Round	Opponents	First leg	Second leg	Aggregate score
1st	Oulun Palloseura	1–1 (a)	10–1 (h)	11–2
2nd	Aberdeen	1–0 (a)	4–0 (h)	5–0
Quarter-finals	CSKA Sofia	5–1 (h)	1–0 (a)	6–1
Semi-finals	Bayern Munich	0–0 (h)	1–1 (a)	1–1

Liverpool gained entry to the competition by winning the 1979–80 Football League First Division, entering as English champions. Their opponents in the first round were Finnish champions Oulun Palloseura. The first leg in Finland at the Raatti Stadion was drawn 1–1. The second leg at Liverpool's home ground Anfield resulted in a comprehensive 10–1 victory for Liverpool. Two of their players, Graeme Souness and Terry McDermott, scored a hat-trick. Liverpool won the tie 11–2 on aggregate.

In the second round, Liverpool were drawn against Scottish champions Aberdeen, managed by Alex Ferguson. The first leg was at Aberdeen's home ground, Pittodrie, a McDermott goal in the fifth minute ensured a 1–0 victory for Liverpool. The second leg at Anfield was won 4–0 by Liverpool, thus they won the tie 5–0 on aggregate. Liverpool's opponents in the quarter-finals were Bulgarian champions CSKA Sofia. The first leg was held in England, another hat-trick from Souness and goals from McDermott and Sammy Lee gave Liverpool a 5–1 victory. They won the second leg at the Vasil Levski National Stadium 1–0 to progress to the semi-finals courtesy of a 6–1 aggregate victory.

They faced West German champions Bayern Munich in the semi-finals. The first leg in England ended in a 0–0 draw. Liverpool needed to score in the second leg to advance to the final. Their cause was not helped when striker Kenny Dalglish had to be replaced in the early minutes of the match by the inexperienced Howard Gayle. However, Gayle rose to the occasion, unsettling the Bayern defence with his attacking threat. With seven minutes of normal time left, Ray Kennedy scored to give Liverpool a 1–0 lead. Bayern responded soon afterwards when Karl-Heinz Rummenigge scored, however, they needed to score another goal due to the away goals rule. They were unable to do so and Liverpool progressed to their third final in five seasons.

== Match ==
=== Background ===
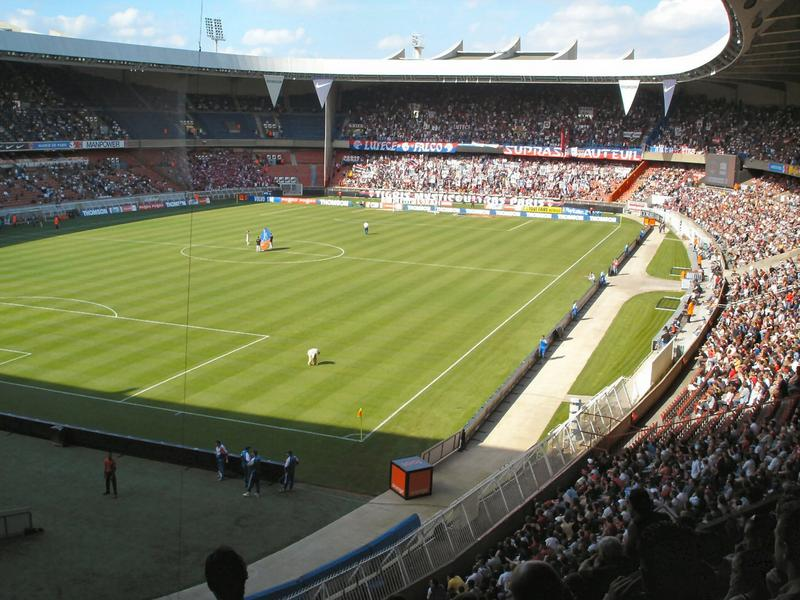
The Parc des Princes, which was hosting the final for the third time.

Real Madrid were appearing in their ninth European Cup final, they had won the competition six times, including a record five successive victories from 1956 to 1960. Their sixth victory was in 1966, while their two losses were in 1962 and 1964. Liverpool were appearing in their third final. They had won their two previous appearances in 1977 and 1978.

Real Madrid had finished second in the 1980–81 La Liga, they had qualified for the UEFA Cup as a result, but victory would enable them to compete in the European Cup the following season. Liverpool had finished fifth during the 1980–81 Football League First Division, thus they needed to win the final to ensure that they would compete in the European Cup the following season. Despite this, Liverpool had won the Football League Cup for the first time earlier in the season, defeating West Ham United 2–1 in a replay after the final finished 1–1.

Both sides had injury concerns before the match. Real had concerns over striker Laurie Cunningham who had been sidelined since November. Liverpool had doubts over a number of players. Kenny Dalglish had not trained for several weeks, while Alan Kennedy had been sidelined for six weeks with a broken wrist.

=== Summary ===
Liverpool controlled the opening passages of the game. Their first goalscoring chance came in the 11th minute when Alan Kennedy's 30-yard shot was saved by Real goalkeeper Agustín. Further chances were created, but neither Terry McDermott or Dalglish were able to score. Real started to exert more of an influence after this, midfielder Juanito started to cause Liverpool problems with his passing. One pass found José Antonio Camacho, who beat Liverpool defender Alan Hansen but put his shot wide of the Liverpool goal. Despite their scoring opportunity, one problem Real had was to get the best out of their winger Cunningham. Not fully fit, he was tightly marked and made little impact in the match.

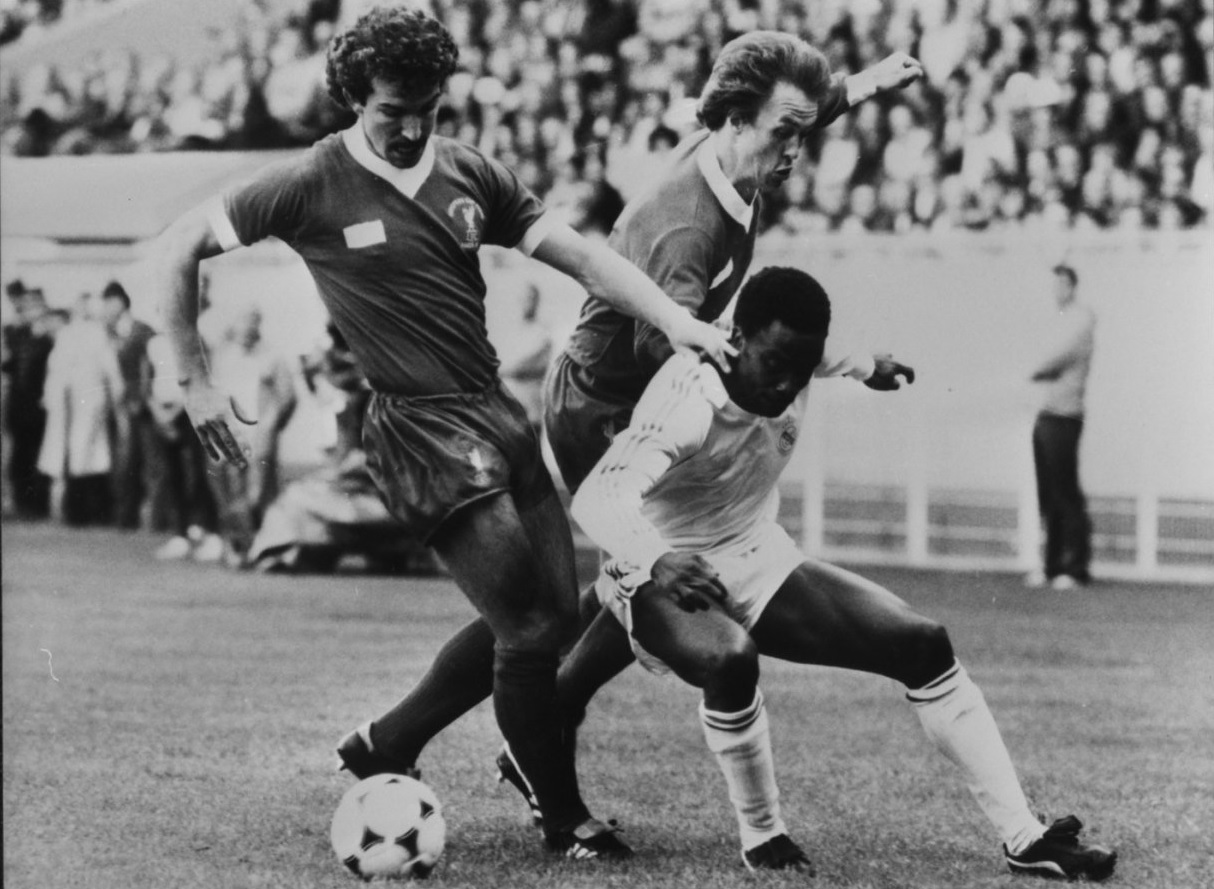
Graeme Souness, Phil Neal and Laurie Cunningham fighting over the ball in the final

Liverpool had a chance to take the lead before half-time. Phil Neal advanced down the right-hand side of the pitch and found Dalglish, who passed to Graeme Souness, who ran late through the Real defence. His subsequent shot was not held by Agustín, but Souness was unable to get to the rebounded ball. Real had the first chance of the second half. Liverpool's defence had stopped as they thought Cunningham was offside; however, he was not and Camacho advanced towards Ray Clemence in the Liverpool goal. Clemence came off his line and ran towards the Real midfielder Camacho, who attempted to lob the ball over the keeper, but his shot went over the goal.

Mural of Alan Kennedy holding the European Cup in 1981 after he scored the winner for Liverpool

The tactical approaches of the two sides were cancelling each other out. Real's slow pace was interspersed with high-speed bursts, while Liverpool preferred a more deliberate approach, keeping possession and making use of their wingers. Their various forms of marking also negated each other. Real man marked Liverpool's best players, such as Dalglish and Souness, while Liverpool were content for the nearest defender to mark the man on the ball.

Despite the tactical battle, Liverpool were able to score in the 81st minute. A throw-in from Ray Kennedy found Alan Kennedy, whose run up the left-hand side of the pitch caught Real off-guard. Kennedy went past Real defender Rafael García Cortés into the Real box, his subsequent shot beat the Real goalkeeper to give Liverpool the lead. Soon afterwards, Liverpool replaced Dalglish with midfielder Jimmy Case in an attempt to see out the match. Although Liverpool had chances to extend their lead as Real went all out to score, Real keeper Agustín made several saves to keep his team in the game. The score remained 1–0 and Liverpool won their third European Cup, the first English club to do so. Liverpool's victory meant that Bob Paisley became the first manager to win the European Cup three times.

=== Details ===
27 May 1981
20:15 CEST

Real Madrid (Spain)	0–1	(England) Liverpool
	Report	A. Kennedy 82'

Parc des Princes, Paris
Attendance: 48,360
Referee: Károly Palotai (Hungary)

Real Madrid	Liverpool

GK	1	(Spain) Agustín
RB	2	(Spain) Rafael García Cortés		(substituted off) 87'
LB	3	(Spain) José Antonio Camacho
CM	4	(West Germany) Uli Stielike	(yellow card) 59'
CB	5	(Spain) Andrés Sabido
CM	6	(Spain) Vicente del Bosque
RF	7	(Spain) Juanito
CM	8	(Spain) Ángel
CF	9	(Spain) Santillana (c)
CB	10	(Spain) Antonio García Navajas
LF	11	(England) Laurie Cunningham
Substitutes:
GK	12	(Spain) Miguel Ángel
DF	13	(Spain) Isidoro San José
MF	14	(Spain) Isidro
MF	15	(Spain) Francisco García Hernández
MF	16	(Spain) Francisco Pineda		(substituted on) 87'
Manager:
(Socialist Federal Republic of Yugoslavia) Vujadin Boškov

GK	1	(England) Ray Clemence
RB	2	(England) Phil Neal
LB	3	(England) Alan Kennedy
CB	4	(England) Phil Thompson (c)
LM	5	(England) Ray Kennedy	(yellow card) 29'
CB	6	(Scotland) Alan Hansen
CF	7	(Scotland) Kenny Dalglish		(substituted off) 85'
RM	8	(England) Sammy Lee
CF	9	(England) David Johnson
CM	10	(England) Terry McDermott
CM	11	(Scotland) Graeme Souness
Substitutes:
MF	12	(England) Jimmy Case		(substituted on) 85'
GK	13	(England) Steve Ogrizovic
DF	14	(England) Colin Irwin
DF	15	(England) Richard Money
FW	16	(England) Howard Gayle
Manager:
(England) Bob Paisley

== See also ==
- 1980–81 Real Madrid CF season
- 1980–81 Liverpool F.C. season
- 1981 European Cup Winners' Cup final
- 1981 European Super Cup
- 1981 UEFA Cup final
- 2018 UEFA Champions League final – contested between same teams
- 2022 UEFA Champions League final – contested between same teams
- Real Madrid CF in international football
- Liverpool F.C. in international football

== Bibliography ==
- Ponting, Ivan; Hale, Steve (1992). Liverpool in Europe. London: Guinness Publishing. ISBN 0-85112-569-7.
- Kelly, Stephen F. (1988). You'll Never Walk Alone. London: Queen Anne Press. ISBN 0-356-19594-5.
