= 1982 Copa del Rey final =

Copa del Rey 1982 final
- Event: 1981–82 Copa del Rey
Real Madrid	Sporting Gijón
2	1
- Date: 13 April 1982
- Venue: Estadio Nuevo José Zorrilla, Valladolid
- Referee: Victoriano Sánchez Arminio
- Attendance: 30,000

The 1982 Copa del Rey final was the 80th final of the King's Cup. The final was played at Estadio Nuevo José Zorrilla in Valladolid, on 13 April 1982, being won by Real Madrid, who beat Sporting de Gijón 2–1.

== Details ==
13 April 1982
20:15 CET

Real Madrid	2–1	Sporting de Gijón
Jiménez 4' (o.g.); Ángel 57'	Report (in Spanish)	Ferrero 36' (pen.)

Estadio Nuevo José Zorrilla, Valladolid
Attendance: 30,000
Referee: Victoriano Sánchez Arminio

Real Madrid
Sporting Gijón

GK	1	(Spain) Agustín
DF	2	(Spain) Isidoro San José
DF	5	(Spain) Andrés Sabido		(substituted off) 46'
DF	4	(West Germany) Uli Stielike	(yellow card) 17'
DF	3	(Spain) José Antonio Camacho	(yellow card) 27'
MF	7	(Spain) Ito
MF	6	(Spain) Vicente del Bosque		(substituted off) 52'
MF	10	(Spain) Francisco García Hernández
MF	8	(Spain) Juanito
FW	9	(Spain) Santillana (c)
FW	11	(England) Laurie Cunningham
Substitutes:
DF	12	(Spain) Rafael García Cortés		(substituted on) 46'
MF	14	(Spain) Ángel		(substituted on) 52'
Manager:
(Spain) Luis Molowny

GK	1	(Spain) José Aurelio Rivero
DF	2	(Spain) José Antonio Redondo (c)	(yellow card) 34'
DF	5	(Spain) Manuel Jiménez
DF	4	(Spain) Antonio Maceda
DF	3	(Spain) Nicolás Pereda
MF	10	(Spain) Andrés		(substituted off) 63'
MF	8	(Spain) Joaquín
MF	7	(Spain) Manuel Mesa
MF	6	(Spain) Francisco Uría
FW	9	(Spain) Abel		(substituted off) 66'
FW	11	(Argentina) Enzo Ferrero
Substitutes:
FW	12	(Portugal) Fernando Gomes		(substituted on) 66'
FW	15	(Spain) José Luis Urrecho		(substituted on) 63'
Manager:
(Spain) José Manuel Díaz Novoa

MATCH RULES

- 90 minutes.
- 30 minutes of extra-time if necessary.
- Penalty shoot-out if scores still level.
- Four named substitutes.
- Maximum of two substitutions.
