= Laurie Cunningham =

English footballer (1956–1989)

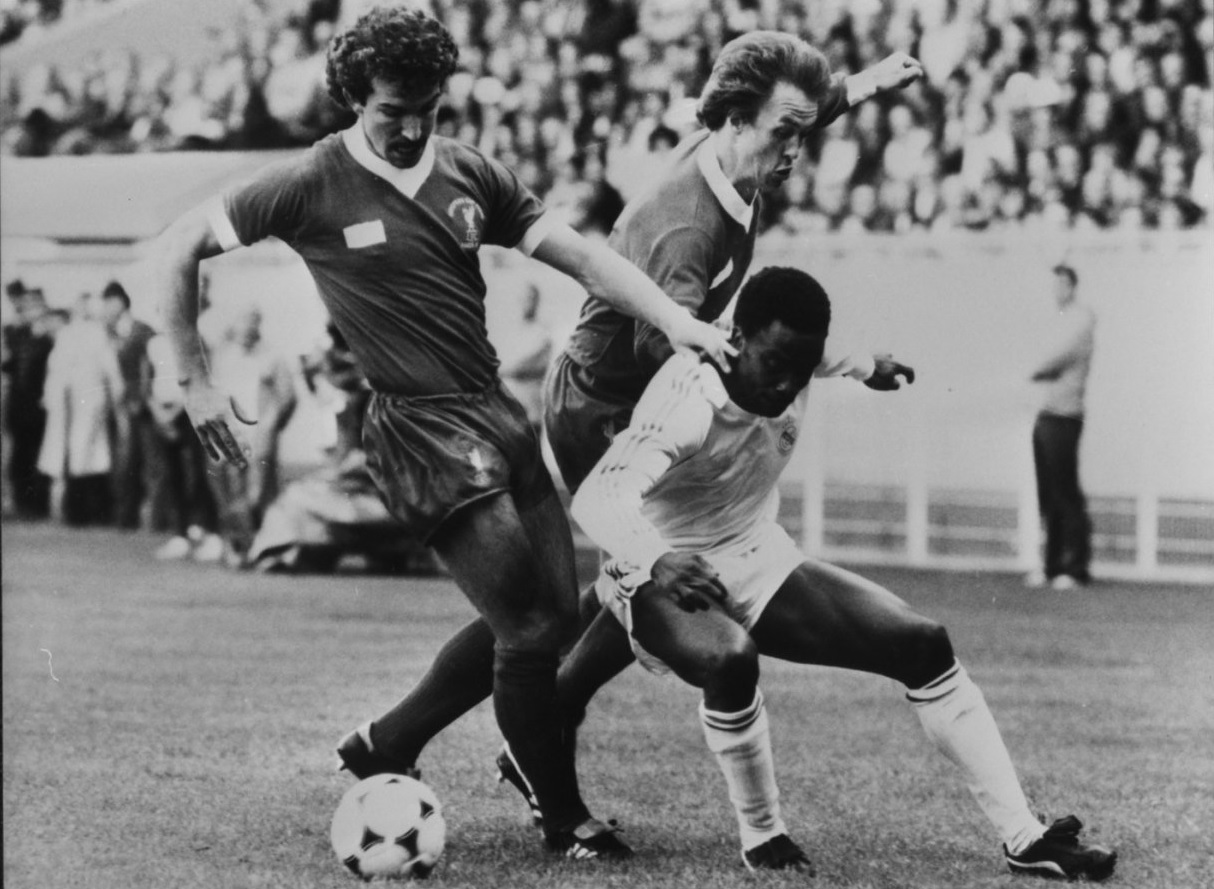
- Cunningham (right) playing for Real Madrid in 1981

Personal information
- Full name: Laurence Paul Cunningham
- Date of birth: 8 March 1956
- Place of birth: Archway, London, England
- Date of death: 15 July 1989 (aged 33)
- Place of death: Madrid, Spain
- Position: Winger

Youth career
- 1970–1972: Arsenal

Senior career*
Years	Team	Apps	(Gls)
1974–1977	Leyton Orient	75	(15)
1977–1979	West Bromwich Albion	86	(21)
1979–1984	Real Madrid	44	(13)
1983	→ Manchester United (loan)	5	(1)
1983–1984	→ Sporting Gijón (loan)	30	(3)
1984–1985	Marseille	30	(8)
1985–1986	Leicester City	15	(0)
1986–1987	Rayo Vallecano	37	(1)
1987	Charleroi	1	(0)
1988	Wimbledon	6	(1)
1988–1989	Rayo Vallecano	19	(1)
Total		348	(67)

International career
1977–1978	England U21	6	(2)
1978	England B	1	(0)
1979–1980	England	6	(0)
- * Club domestic league appearances and goals

Laurence Paul Cunningham (8 March 1956 – 15 July 1989) was an English professional footballer who played as a winger. He notably played in England, France, and Spain, where he became the first-ever English player to sign for Real Madrid.

Cunningham had signed a schoolboy contract with Arsenal in 1970, but was released in 1972 as his style of play was deemed incompatible with the Gunners' "give and go" tactics. In 1974, he was picked up by second-tier side Leyton Orient where he remained for three years. But it was following his move to West Bromwich Albion in 1977 that his career really took off. There he played alongside Cyrille Regis and Brendon Batson under coach Ron Atkinson, becoming only the second trio of black players to be fielded in the top flight of English football. They became known as the Three Degrees – a term coined by Atkinson in reference to the American soul group of the same name. His form at the Hawthorns later earned a move to Real Madrid, where he remained for five years, winning La Liga once and the Copa del Rey twice. After a one-season spell in France with Marseille, he returned to England with Leicester City in 1985, followed by another spell in Spain with Rayo Vallecano, and helped them secure La Liga promotion with his winning goal in the 86/87 season. Cunningham signed with Wimbledon in 1988, where, as a member of the "Crazy Gang", he won the FA Cup in 1988 for the final trophy of his career.

Cunningham received his first international call-up to the England U21 side in 1977 while playing for West Bromwich Albion, becoming the first black footballer to represent an England international team organised by the Football Association. He later earned six caps for the full national team between 1979 and 1980, becoming one of the first-ever black England internationals.

== Early life ==
Born in Archway, London, he was the son of a former Jamaican race-horse jockey. Cunningham started in schoolboy football and was turned down by Arsenal before joining Leyton Orient in 1974.

== Club career ==
=== West Bromwich Albion ===
He joined West Bromwich Albion in 1977, where, under manager Johnny Giles, he teamed up with another black player, Cyrille Regis, and the following year under Ron Atkinson, with Brendon Batson. This was the second time an English top-flight team simultaneously fielded three black players (the first being Clyde Best, Clive Charles and Ade Coker for West Ham United against Tottenham Hotspur in April 1972) and Atkinson collectively referred to Cunningham, Batson and Regis as the Three Degrees after the U.S. soul singing trio.

Whilst a West Bromwich Albion player, he played in a benefit match for Len Cantello, that saw a team of white players play against a team of black players.

=== Real Madrid ===
In the summer of 1979, he made a historic move as the first English player to transfer to Real Madrid, who paid West Bromwich Albion a fee of £950,000. He scored twice on his debut and helped Madrid win the league and cup double.

Cunningham began the 1980–81 season with Madrid well and scored goals in the early rounds of the European Cup, but then succumbed to injury, and required an operation on a broken toe. He recovered just in time for the 1981 European Cup final against Liverpool in Paris, as Madrid lost 1–0. During pre-season training for the 1981–82 season, a thigh injury kept Cunningham out of the majority of the season (only three goalless appearances in the league), his only real noteworthy contribution was in the UEFA Cup quarter-final tie against Kaiserslautern. In the first leg, Cunningham scored a goal in Madrid's 3–1 win. In the second leg, however, he was sent off shortly before halftime for retaliation, as Kaiserslautern won 5–0 to inflict Madrid's worst-ever result in European competition. Cunningham won a second Copa del Rey medal as he played in the final, when Madrid beat Sporting Gijón 2–1, but it was a depressing campaign for him. For the next season, with Madrid signing Johnny Metgod to join Uli Stielike as the two permitted foreigners, Cunningham spent most of the 1982–83 season on the sidelines, until he reunited with Ron Atkinson at Manchester United on loan in April 1983. He left Madrid on loan again for the 1983–84 season, joining Gijón, before moving to Olympique Marseille on a permanent deal during the next summer window.

=== Later career ===
Despite losing some of his explosiveness and pace that had defined his early career due to multiple injuries, Cunningham managed a respectable and productive individual season for OM during the 1984–85 season, scoring 8 goals in 30 league matches. Cunningham spent a single season in France, before heading back to England to join Leicester City, although he played only half a season due to further injury. At the end of the 1985–86 season, Cunningham went back to Spain to play for Rayo Vallecano in the second tier. He moved to Charleroi in Belgium for the 1987–88 campaign, but was yet again struck down by injury, and in the new year was back in England on a short-term deal with Wimbledon, where he managed to help the Dons beat Liverpool in the 1988 FA Cup final.

Cunningham later moved back to Spain and Rayo Vallecano for the 1988–89 season. He scored the goal that secured their promotion to the Primera Division.

== International career ==
On 27 April 1977, Cunningham made his debut for the England under-21's team in a friendly match against Scotland at Bramall Lane, scoring on his debut. At the time, he was considered the first black player to wear an England shirt at any level, but it was later revealed that Benjamin Odeje had played for the England Schoolboys team in 1971.

In 1979, he made his debut for the England national football team in a Home International match against Wales.

Although Viv Anderson had been England's first black full international when he made his debut in a friendly in November 1978, Cunningham was the first to have appeared at the highest level in a competitive match.

Despite playing a key role in the Spanish double with Real Madrid, Cunningham was overlooked by England manager Ron Greenwood for a place in the England squad for UEFA Euro 1980. He was called up by Greenwood for the 1982 FIFA World Cup qualifier against Norway, only to be an unused sub as England won 4–0. In the next qualifier against Romania, he came off the bench but was unable to help England avoid a 2–1 defeat. This proved to be the last of his six England caps.

== Death and legacy ==
Cunningham was killed in a car crash in Madrid on the morning of 15 July 1989, at the age of 33. He was survived by his wife and their son.

In November 2004, he was named as one of West Bromwich Albion's 16 greatest players, in a poll organised as part of the club's 125th anniversary celebrations. The club announced that Cunningham would feature in a mural of the former players to be displayed at The Hawthorns.

In October 2013, the Nubian Jak Community Trust unveiled a blue plaque outside Brisbane Road. In September 2015, English Heritage erected a blue plaque on Cunningham's childhood home at 73 Lancaster Road, Stroud Green, London.

In November 2017, a statue by Graham Ibbeson was unveiled in Coronation Gardens, Leyton, near Brisbane Road, paying tribute to Cunningham and his time at Leyton Orient. Another statue by Ibbeson was unveiled in West Bromwich town centre in May 2019. The work commemorates Cunningham's time at Albion alongside black teammates Cyrille Regis and Brendon Batson, with a spokesperson for the organisers commenting that "the three players opened the gates to allow black players into football at a time when they were locked out".

A play based on his life, Getting the Third Degree by Dougie Blaxland, was first performed in 2019.

=== Tributes ===
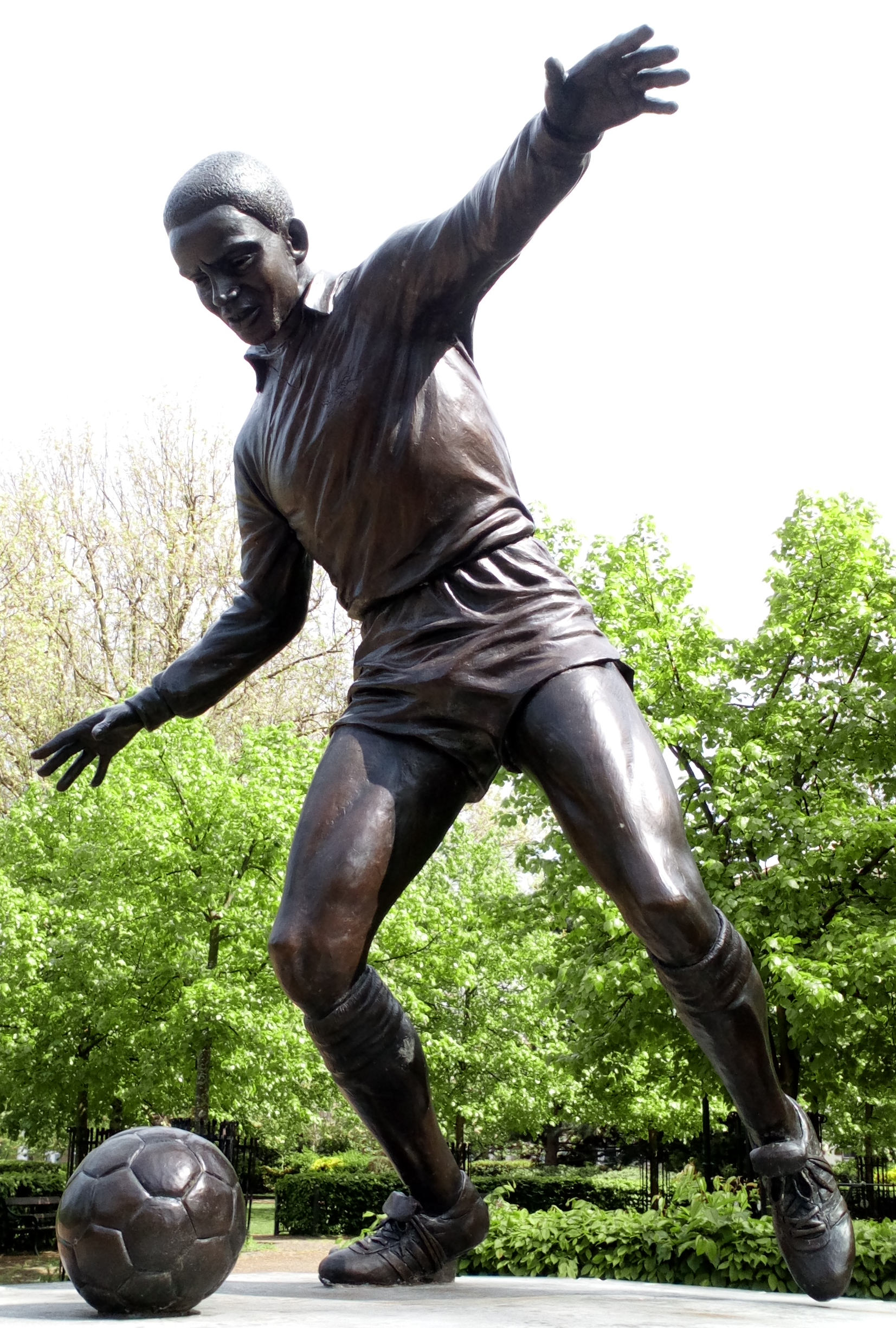
Statue of Cunningham near Brisbane Road

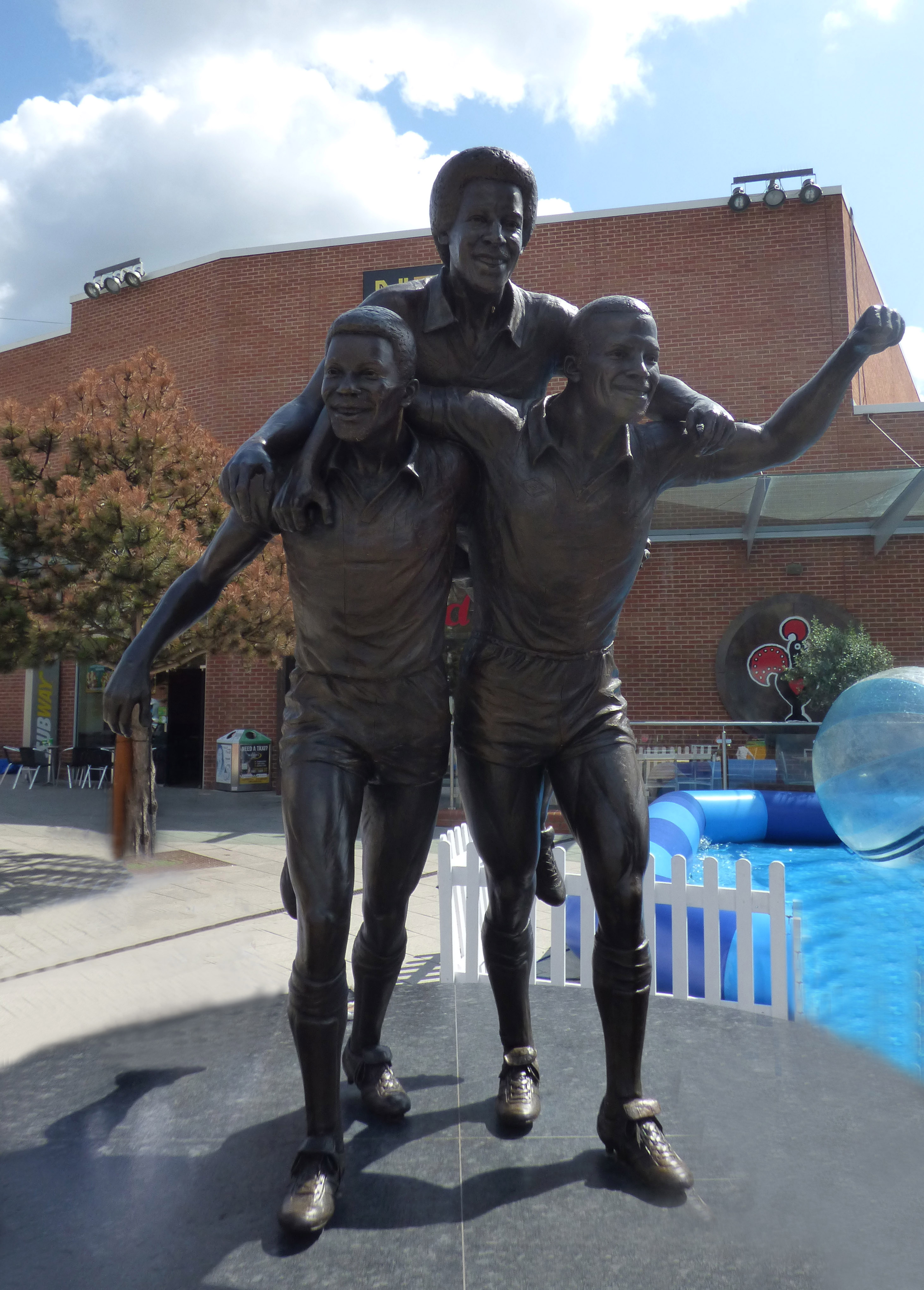
Statue of the Three Degrees by Graham Ibbeson, in West Bromwich New Square

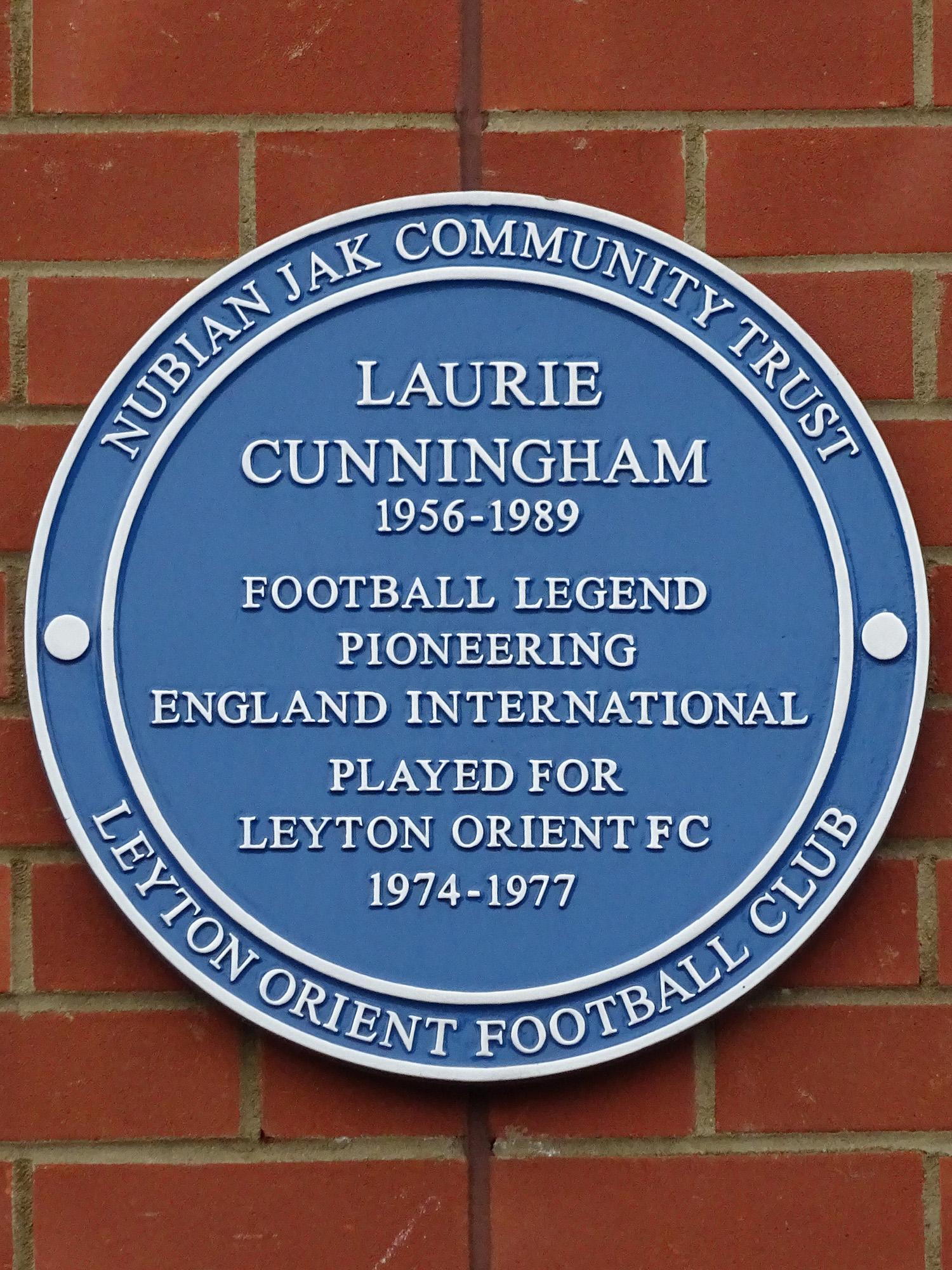
Blue plaque outside Brisbane Road

== Career statistics ==
=== Club ===
Appearances and goals by club, season and competition
Club	Season	League			National cup		League cup		Continental		Total	
Club	Season	Division	Apps	Goals	Apps	Goals	Apps	Goals	Apps	Goals	Apps	Goals
Orient	1974–75	Second Division	17	1	1	0	0	0	—		18	1
Orient	1975–76	Second Division	34	8	0	0	1	0	—		35	8
Orient	1976–77	Second Division	24	6	4	0	4	1	—		32	7
Orient	Total		75	15	5	0	5	1	0	0	85	16
West Bromwich Albion	1976–77	First Division	13	6	0	0	0	0	—		13	6
West Bromwich Albion	1977–78	First Division	33	6	4	0	3	0	—		40	6
West Bromwich Albion	1978–79	First Division	40	9	6	3	3	0	8	4	57	16
West Bromwich Albion	Total		86	21	10	3	6	0	8	4	110	28
Real Madrid	1979–80	La Liga	29	8	5	1	—		7	3	41	12
Real Madrid	1980–81	La Liga	12	5	0	0	—		5	2	17	7
Real Madrid	1981–82	La Liga	3	0	3	0	—		2	1	8	1
Real Madrid	1982–83	La Liga	0	0	0	0	—		0	0	0	0
Real Madrid	Total		44	13	8	1	—		14	6	66	20
Manchester United (loan)	1982–83	First Division	5	1	0	0	0	0	—		5	1
Sporting Gijón (loan)	1983–84	La Liga	30	3	10	4	—		—		40	7
Marseille	1984–85	Division 1	30	8	3	0	—		—		33	8
Leicester City	1985–86	First Division	15	0	0	0	0	0	—		15	0
Rayo Vallecano	1986–87	Segunda División	37	3	0	0	—		—		37	3
Wimbledon	1987–88	First Division	6	2	2	0	0	0	—		8	2
Charleroi	1987–88	First Division	1	0	—		—		—		1	0
Rayo Vallecano	1988–89	Segunda División	19	1	1	0	—		—		20	1
Career total			348	67	39	8	11	1	22	10	420	86

=== International ===
Appearances and goals by national team and year
National team	Year	Apps	Goals
England
England	1979	3	0
England	1980	3	0
Total		6	0

== Honours ==
Real Madrid

- La Liga: 1979–80
- Copa del Rey: 1979–80, 1981–82

Wimbledon

- FA Cup: 1987–88

== Bibliography ==
- D. Bowler & J. Bains (2000), Samba in the Smethwick End: Regis, Cunningham, Batson and the Football Revolution. ISBN 1-84018-188-5
- Paul Rees (2014), The Three Degrees The Men Who Changed British Football Forever. ISBN 978-1-4721-1926-1
