= Juan Antonio Carcelén =

Spanish footballer and manager

Personal information
- Full name: Juan Antonio Carcelén García
- Date of birth: 28 April 1954 (age 72)
- Place of birth: Albacete, Spain
- Height: 1.81 m (5 ft 11 in)
- Position: Midfielder

Youth career
- 1969–1971: Albacete
- 1971–1972: Hércules

Senior career*
Years	Team	Apps	(Gls)
1970–1971	Albacete	10	(0)
1972–1981	Hércules	165	(7)
1973–1974	→ Hellín (loan)		
1981–1984	Real Madrid	11	(0)
1984–1985	Hércules	0	(0)

International career
1972	Spain U18	2	(0)

Managerial career
- 1985–1987: Hércules Promesas
- 1989: Betis Florida (youth)
- 1989–1990: Hércules Promesas
- 1990: Hércules
- 1991–1994: Mutxamel
- 1994–1996: Hércules (youth)
- 1996–1997: Español San Vicente
- 1998–1999: Hércules (youth)
- 2001–2002: Mutxamel
- * Club domestic league appearances and goals

Juan Antonio Carcelén García (born 28 April 1954) is a Spanish former football player and manager. He played as a midfielder.

== Career ==
At age 16 Carcelén made his debut with Albacete Balompié and began to be followed by several teams. In June 1971, Hércules bought Carcelén and Perico Serrano, the top two youth players of Albacete. Hércules paid 300,000 pesetas to Manchegan club for both players. In his first season in Alicante, García played with youth Hércules, though he trained and played games with the first team.

In the 1973–74 season he was loaned along with Perico Serrano to AD Hellín, where they had many minutes in the third level. From there he became a key player for many years for Hércules. He played for Spain at youth level in two games.

After seven seasons with the Hércules in La Liga, Real Madrid signed him and his transfer cost 40 million pesetas. He came to Madrid as Vujadin Boškov personal commitment. In the 1981–82 season he played 11 games in the league and won the Copa del Rey. In the next two seasons he did not play any games due to a serious knee injury. He belonged to Real Madrid for three seasons.

In the 1984–85 season he moved to Hércules but never recovered from the injury and did not play. He retired as a player in 1985 and began training the reserves of Hércules. As a coach he became a man of the house, which stands midseason as head coach of Hércules in the 1989–90 season. In the 2007–08 season he returned to Hércules as responsible for the capture players in the lower grades.

== Personal life ==
Carcelén is currently disconnected from football. CAM bank is to work since his retirement as a player. He is a commentator for games of Hércules in some local radio stations in the city of Alicante.
