= Benjamin Odeje =

English footballer

Personal information
- Date of birth: c. 1955
- Place of birth: Nigeria
- Position: Centre-forward

Youth career
- 1968–?: Blackheath District
- London Schoolboys
- 1971–1973: Charlton Athletic

Senior career*
| Years | Team | Apps | (Gls) |
| 1971–1973 | Charlton Athletic | 0 | (0) |
| 1974–1975 | Dulwich Hamlet | | |
| 1975 | Hendon | 2 | (0) |
| 1975 | Finchley | | |
| 1975–1976 | Clapton | | |
| 1976–1977 | Dulwich Hamlet | 6 | (0) |
| 1977–1989 | Trowbridge Town | | |

International career
| 1971 | England Schoolboys | 5 | (1) |
- * Club domestic league appearances and goals

Benjamin Odeje (born c. 1955) is an English former footballer. He was the first black footballer to represent England at any level. Signed to Charlton Athletic, he played in five schoolboy internationals, making his debut against Northern Ireland at Wembley in 1971.

Odeje gave a rare interview to Tell A Friend podcast, in July 2020, where he spoke about the racism he endured during his football career.

== Life and career ==
Odeje was born in Nigeria and as a child moved to England with his parents. The family lived in south-east London, where Odeje attended South East London Secondary School in Deptford, and his mother worked as a nurse. In March 1971, as a 15-year-old, he was selected for the England schoolboys team to play Northern Ireland schoolboys at Wembley. His father was concerned that the considerable publicity surrounding Odeje's selection, as "the first African to play Soccer for England", might make him "a marked man" in the match. Playing out of position on the right wing, Odeje helped his team to a 1–0 win.

He had acquired the nickname "Pelé" by scoring nearly 400 goals in three seasons in schools football, and for the match against the Netherlands schoolboys team in April, he played in his natural position at centre forward. Leslie Nichol in the Daily Express expected him to use his "amazing speed" to combine with Chelsea's Brian Bason to "destroy the Dutch defence". England won 5–1; Odeje scored once and Bason twice. In total, Odeje played five times for England schoolboys.

In November 1971, an article in the Daily Mirror discussing the increasingly multiracial makeup of football in England mentioned that "more than twenty League clubs [had] at least one coloured player on their books". Odeje played for his local professional club, Charlton Athletic. He played in France with Charlton's youth team in the summer of 1971, and set up the goal that earned them a place in the quarter-finals of the 1972–73 FA Youth Cup. He never played for Charlton's first team, but went on to appear in non-League football in the London area for clubs including Hendon, Clapton and Dulwich Hamlet. He was still playing for Trowbridge Town in 1989.

Odeje later coached at Queens Park Rangers, worked as a teacher of physical education, and ran children's soccer schools in north London.
