= Luis de Carlos =

Spanish football executive (1907–1994)

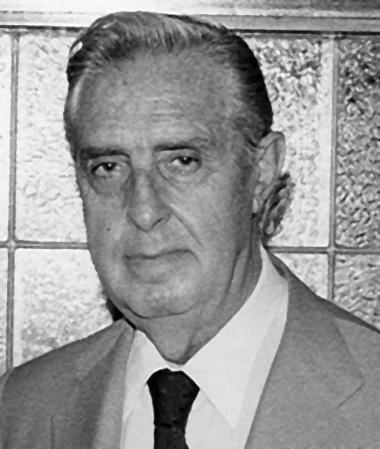

12th president of Real Madrid
- In office September 1978 – 24 May 1985
- Preceded by: Santiago Bernabéu
- Succeeded by: Ramón Mendoza

Personal details
- Born: 16 March 1907 Madrid, Spain
- Died: 27 May 1994 (aged 87) Madrid, Spain
- Occupation: Football administrator

Luis de Carlos Ortiz (16 March 1907 – 27 May 1994) was a Spanish football administrator who was the 12th president of Real Madrid from September 1978 until 24 May 1985.

De Carlos was elected president of Real Madrid after the death of Santiago Bernabéu. Under his leadership, the club won two league titles, two Spanish Cups, one League Cup, and one UEFA Cup, but fell short of clinching its seventh European Cup after a 0–1 loss to Liverpool in the 1981 final, and its first European Cup Winners' Cup following the defeat to Aberdeen in the 1983 final.

He did not run in the elections of 1985 and was succeeded by Ramón Mendoza at the helm of the club.

== Honours ==
=== Football ===
Real Madrid:

- La Liga:
  - 1978–79, 1979–80
- Copa del Rey:
  - 1979–80, 1981–82
- Copa de la Liga:
  - 1985
- UEFA Cup:
  - 1984–85

=== Basketball ===
Real Madrid Basketball:

- Liga Española de Baloncesto / Liga ACB:
  - 1978–79, 1979–80, 1981–82, 1983–84, 1984–85
- Copa del Rey de Baloncesto:
  - 1985
- Supercopa de España de Baloncesto:
  - 1984–85
- FIBA European Champions Cup:
  - 1979–80
- FIBA European Cup Winners' Cup:
  - 1983–84
- European Basketball Club Super Cup:
  - 1984
- FIBA Intercontinental Cup / FIBA Club World Cup:
  - 1978, 1981

=== Volleyball ===
Real Madrid Volleyball:

- División de Honor:
  - 1978–79, 1979–80, 1982–83
- Copa del Rey de Voleibol:
  - 1978, 1979, 1980, 1981, 1983
