= Ito (footballer, born 1961) =

Spanish footballer

Personal information
- Full name: Andrés Alonso García
- Date of birth: 26 April 1961 (age 65)
- Place of birth: Salamanca, Spain
- Height: 1.75 m (5 ft 9 in)
- Position: Right winger

Senior career*
Years	Team	Apps	(Gls)
1979	Salamanca B	11	(1)
1979–1980	Palencia	17	(3)
1980–1981	Salamanca	29	(1)
1981–1985	Real Madrid	42	(6)
1984–1985	→ Valladolid	8	(0)
1985–1988	Betis	35	(4)
1988–1990	Ceuta	42	(9)
1990–1991	Cultural Leonesa	6	(0)
Total		190	(24)

International career
1981–1982	Spain U21	7	(0)
1981	Spain B	1	(0)
- * Club domestic league appearances and goals

Andrés Alonso García (born 26 April 1961), known as Ito, is a Spanish former footballer who played as a right winger.

He played 114 La Liga games and scored 11 goals, representing Salamanca, Real Madrid, Real Valladolid and Real Betis. He won the Copa del Rey with Real Madrid in 1982.

== Club career ==
=== Salamanca ===
Born in Salamanca, Ito began his career at his hometown club UD Salamanca. He made his first-team debut on 17 October 1979 in the second leg of the first round of the Copa del Rey, at home to Benavente; he was substituted at half time in a 3–0 win. The following 6 April he made his one appearance of the La Liga season, as a late replacement in a 2–1 win over Hércules also at the Helmántico Stadium. He played regularly for the Charros in 1980–81, scoring his only goal on 11 January to secure a 1–1 draw away to Real Murcia.

=== Real Madrid ===
In March 1981, 19-year-old Ito agreed a five-year deal to transfer Real Madrid, effective from July. The transfer would be worth between 20 and 25 million Spanish pesetas, in addition to the loan of two or three players from the capital city club's reserve team, Castilla. On his debut on 20 September he took under two minutes to score away to champions Real Sociedad in the first game of the season, albeit in a 3–1 loss. Ten days later in the UEFA Cup, he was one of four players – split equally between the two teams – to be sent off in a 1–0 home win over Tatabánya of Hungary. In the team's winning Copa del Rey campaign, he scored in a 5–1 home win over Málaga in the last 16, and played the full 90 minutes of the 2–1 victory over Sporting Gijón in the final on 13 April.

On 13 October 1982, Ito played the first half of the first leg of the Supercopa de España, a 1–0 win over Real Sociedad, though the Basque side would win overall. At the end of the season he played both legs of the Copa de la Liga final that his team lost against Barcelona.

In August 1984, Ito was loaned to Real Valladolid. He made only 11 appearances in all competitions for the club from his native Castile and León, scoring twice on 11 April in an 8–0 home win over Antequerano in the first round of the Copa de la Liga.

=== Betis ===
Ito left the Santiago Bernabéu Stadium permanently in August 1985, signing for Real Betis after manager Luis Molowny had considered dropping him down to Castilla. The deal saw the cancellation of a friendly match that had been promised to Betis as compensation for Rafael Gordillo's transfer in the other direction. On his debut on 15 September, he came on for Antolín Ortega with 12 minutes to play and scored the equaliser in a 2–2 draw at Real Sociedad's Atotxa Stadium, the site of his first game and goal for Real Madrid.

== International career ==
Ito earned seven caps for Spain at under-21 level. His debut on 18 February 1981 was a 1–0 friendly win away to France in Toulouse; his performance was highlighted by Juan Antonio Calvo of Mundo Deportivo. In June, he played at the Toulon tournament.

On 18 November 1981, Ito played for Spain B in a 2–0 friendly win over Poland B at La Romareda in Zaragoza. He was substituted after 52 minutes.
