= Vujadin Boškov =

Yugoslavian footballer and manager (1931–2014)

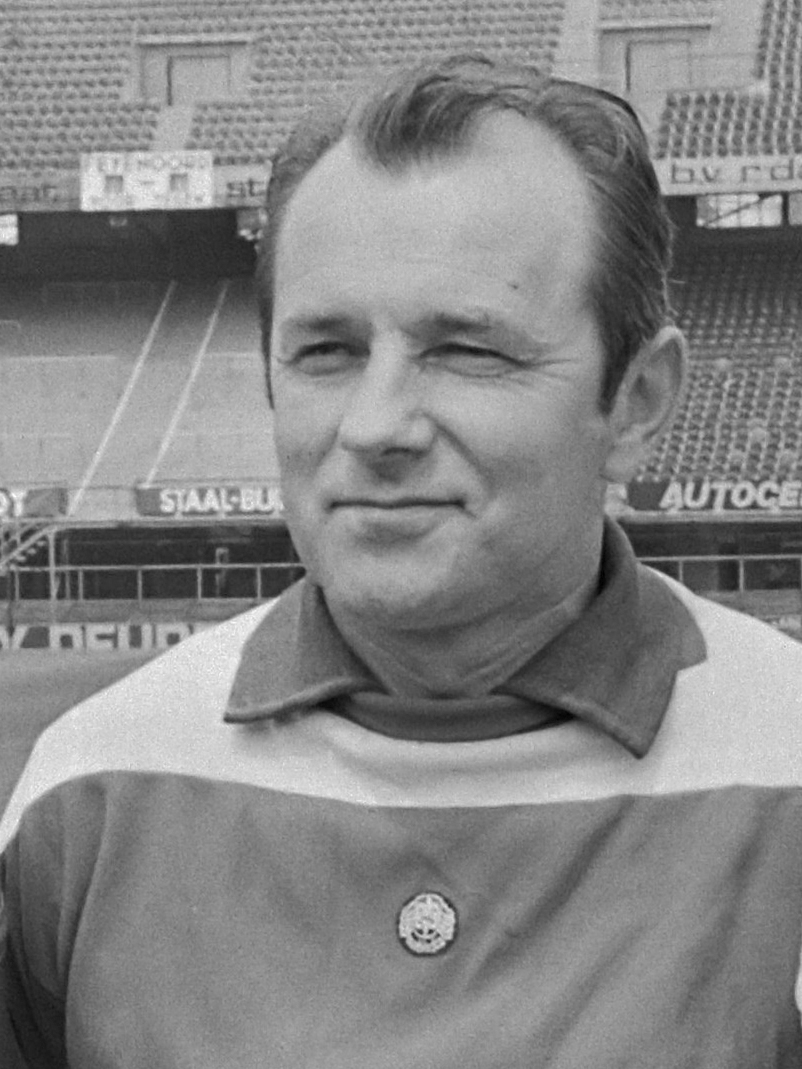
- Boškov coaching Feyenoord in 1976

Personal information
- Date of birth: 16 May 1931
- Place of birth: Begeč, Kingdom of Yugoslavia
- Date of death: 27 April 2014 (aged 82)
- Place of death: Novi Sad, Serbia
- Height: 1.70 m (5 ft 7 in)
- Position: Right half

Senior career*
Years	Team	Apps	(Gls)
1948–1960	Vojvodina	185	(15)
1961–1962	Sampdoria	13	(0)
1962–1964	Young Fellows Zürich	14	(4)
Total		212	(19)

International career
1951–1958	Yugoslavia	57	(0)

Managerial career
- 1962–1964: Young Fellows Zürich (player-manager)
- 1964–1967: Vojvodina (technical director)
- 1966: Yugoslavia (co-manager)
- 1968–1974: Vojvodina (technical director)
- 1971–1973: Yugoslavia
- 1974–1976: ADO Den Haag
- 1976–1978: Feyenoord
- 1978–1979: Zaragoza
- 1979–1982: Real Madrid
- 1982–1984: Sporting Gijón
- 1984–1986: Ascoli
- 1986–1992: Sampdoria
- 1992–1993: Roma
- 1994–1996: Napoli
- 1996–1997: Servette
- 1997–1998: Sampdoria
- 1999: Perugia
- 1999–2000: FR Yugoslavia
- 2001: FR Yugoslavia (co-manager)
Medal record
Representing Yugoslavia
Men's football
Silver medal – second place	1952 Helsinki	Team competition
- * Club domestic league appearances and goals

Vujadin Boškov (Serbian Cyrillic: Вујадин Бошков, pronounced [ʋujǎdin bǒʃkoʋ]; 16 May 1931 – 27 April 2014) was a Serbian football player and manager.

A midfielder, he played 57 matches for the Yugoslavia national team. He experienced his greatest success as a coach in 1990, when he won the European Cup Winners' Cup with Sampdoria. He also reached the European Cup final in 1981 with Real Madrid and 1992 with Sampdoria. He also won the Yugoslav First League as technical director and the La Liga, the Copa del Rey, the Serie A and the Coppa Italia twice as a coach.

Throughout his career as a football manager, he stood out both for his many successes, as well as due to his unique sense of humour and memorable ironic comments, which were used to dissolve tension during post-match interviews; these led him to become a popular figure with football fans during his time in Italy.

FC Vujadin Boškov, Vojvodina's training facility in Veternik, was named after him in 1996 and in February 2022, he was posthumously admitted to the Italian Football Hall of Fame.

== Early life and club career ==
Boškov was born in the Yugoslavian village of Begeč, 10 km (6 miles) from Novi Sad in Bunarska Street to father Boja, a village carpenter, and mother Marija. His family lived in Novi Sad before moving to Begeč during the Second World War where his grandfather lived. Vujadin had an older brother named Aca (also a footballer), who was six years older than Vujadin, who died very young. Vujadin also has two younger sisters, sister Verica (Vera) and sister Danica (Dada), the latter still living. Boškov graduated from the Trgovačka akademija (trade school).

A fan of his local team, Boškov played with Vojvodina for most of his career (1946–1960), as well as continuously supporting it. In 1961 he moved to Italy to play for Serie A club Sampdoria for one season (1961–62), before accepting a stint as a player-coach at Swiss side Young Fellows Zürich (1962–1964). Boškov then returned to the club that made him as a player – FK Vojvodina – and spent seven seasons (1964–1971) as a technical director, leading the club to winning one Yugoslav league championship in 1965–66.

== International career ==
He also became a playing member of the Yugoslavia national team and made his debut for them in a June 1951 friendly match against Switzerland. He earned a total of 57 caps (no goals) and was part of the team that won the silver medal at the 1952 Olympic football tournament. Also he played at the 1954 and 1958 FIFA World Cups. His final international was at the latter tournament against West Germany.

== Managerial career ==
Boškov soon developed a successful international coaching career with stints in the Dutch Eredivisie with ADO Den Haag (1974–1976) and Feyenoord (1976–1978); the Spanish La Liga with Real Zaragoza (1978–79), Real Madrid (1979–1982) and Sporting de Gijon (1983–84); the Italian Serie A with Ascoli (1984–1986), Sampdoria (1986–1992, 1997–98), Roma (1992–93), Napoli (1994–1996) and Perugia (1999); and the Swiss league with Servette (1996–97).

Arguably his greatest achievement as a coach came in 1991, when he steered Sampdoria to the Serie A scudetto. The following season, he led the club to the European Cup final, where they lost 1–0 to Barcelona at Wembley. His Sampdoria side often used a man-marking defensive system.

He also coached FR Yugoslavia at Euro 2000, where they famously lost 4–3 to Spain in Brugge and later went out to hosts the Netherlands in the quarter-finals, after losing 6–1 to the Dutch.

He finished out his career as a scout for Sampdoria in 2006.

Boškov, known for his humorous and ironic quips in interviews, famously once said, "a penalty is when the referee whistles."

== Death and legacy ==
Boškov died after a long illness in Novi Sad, on 27 April 2014, aged 82. He was interred on 30 April in the Begeč Cemetery.

Footballer Vujadin Savić is named after Boškov. In 1996, the FK Vojvodina training facility in Veternik was named after Boškov. Corriere dello sport published a book of his quotations e.g. "Quando l'arbitro fischia... it is a penalty".

In February 2022, he was posthumously admitted to the Italian Football Hall of Fame, by decision of leading figures in the Italian media.

== Managerial statistics ==
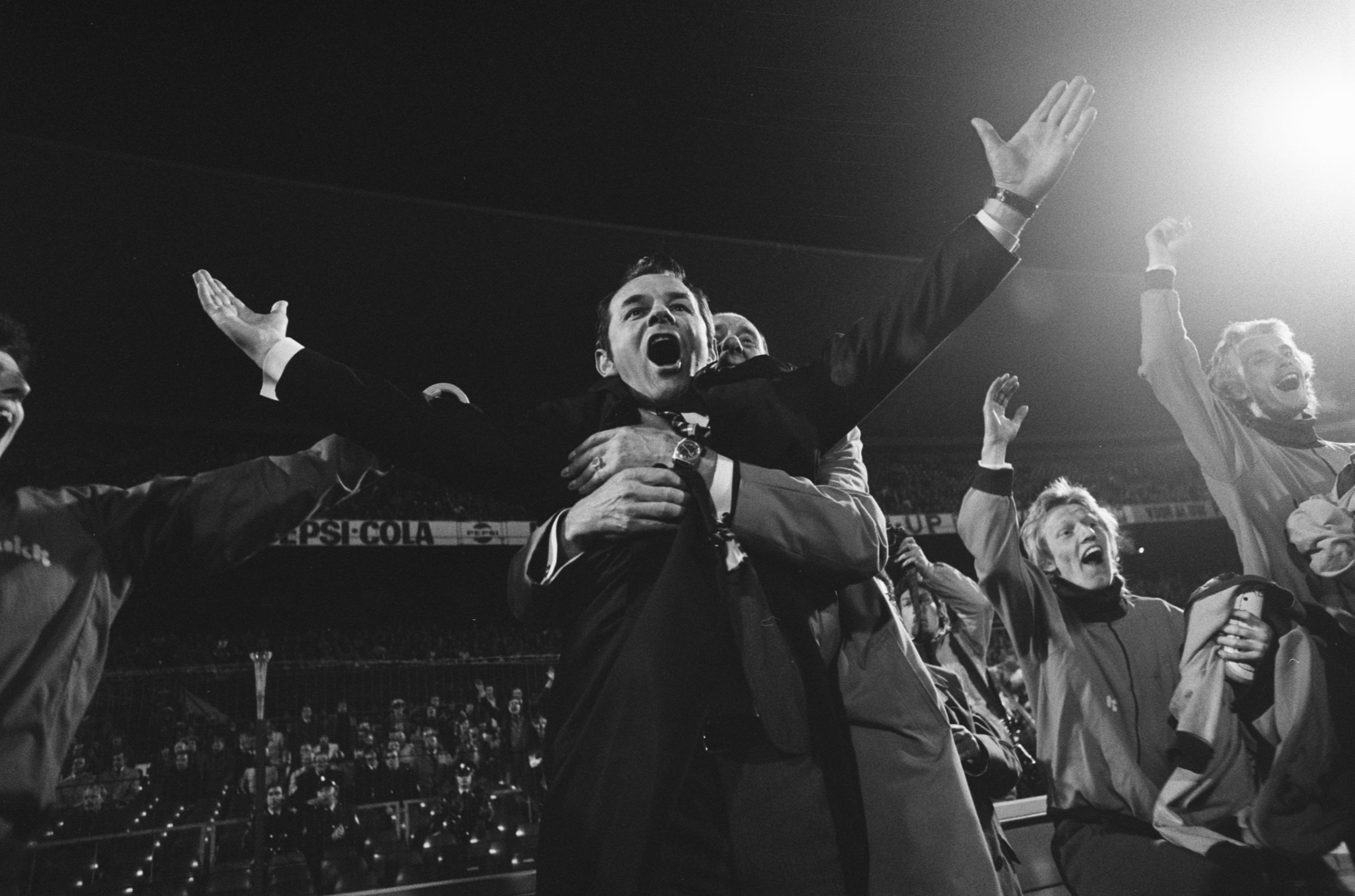
Boškov after winning the 1974–75 Dutch Cup with ADO Den Haag.

Team	From	To	Record				
Team	From	To	P	W	D	L	Win %
Yugoslavia	April 1971	October 1973	27	10	12	5	37.04
ADO Den Haag	June 1974	July 1976	81	31	25	25	38.27
Feyenoord	July 1976	June 1978	80	32	26	22	40.00
Zaragoza	July 1978	May 1979	46	19	9	18	41.30
Real Madrid	August 1979	March 1982	139	80	31	28	57.55
Sporting de Gijon	July 1982	June 1984	79	27	24	28	34.18
Ascoli	November 1984	June 1986	63	23	27	13	36.51
Sampdoria	July 1986	June 1992	289	139	90	60	48.10
Roma	July 1992	June 1993	51	19	18	14	37.25
Napoli	October 1994	June 1996	66	22	21	23	33.33
Servette	July 1996	December 1996	22	5	9	8	22.73
Sampdoria	November 1997	June 1998	26	10	7	9	38.46
Perugia	February 1999	June 1999	14	5	2	7	35.71
FR Yugoslavia	July 1999	July 2000	15	6	5	4	40.00
FR Yugoslavia	May 2001	October 2001	8	4	2	2	50.00
Total			1,006	432	308	266	42.94

== Honours ==
=== Manager ===
Vojvodina

- Yugoslav First League: 1965–66 (as technical director)

ADO Den Haag

- KNVB Cup: 1974–75

Real Madrid

- La Liga: 1979–80
- Copa del Rey: 1979–80
- European Cup runner up: 1980–81

Ascoli

- Serie B: 1985–86

Sampdoria

- European Cup Winners' Cup: 1989–90
- Serie A: 1990–91
- Coppa Italia: 1987–88, 1988–89
- Supercoppa Italiana: 1991
- European Cup runner up: 1991–92

=== Individual ===
- Italian Football Hall of Fame: 2021

== See also ==
- List of football managers with the most matches
