= Ángel Pérez García =

Spanish footballer and manager (1957–2019)

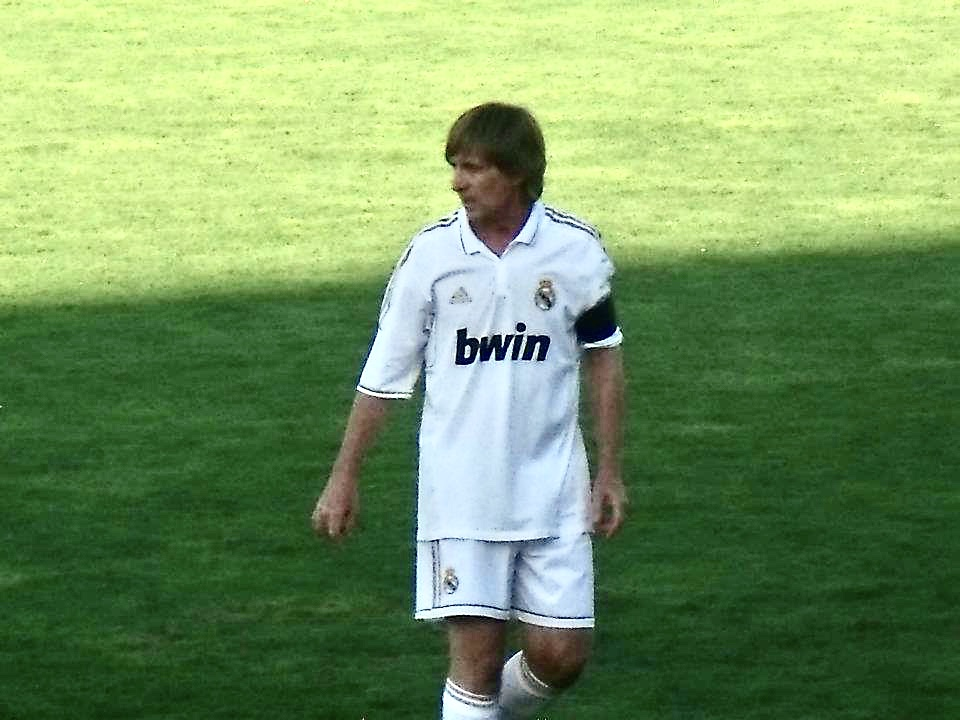
- García playing for Real Madrid's veterans

Personal information
- Full name: Ángel Pérez García
- Date of birth: 16 October 1957
- Place of birth: Madrid, Spain
- Date of death: 16 October 2019 (aged 62)
- Place of death: Murcia, Spain
- Height: 1.73 m (5 ft 8 in)
- Position: Defender

Youth career
- 1973–1977: Real Madrid

Senior career*
Years	Team	Apps	(Gls)
1977–1980	Real Madrid B	53	(0)
1980–1982	Real Madrid	15	(0)
1981–1982	→ Murcia (loan)	28	(0)
1982–1985	Elche	105	(5)
1985–1991	Murcia	191	(1)
1991–1992	Roldán	28	(0)
Total		420	(6)

International career
1976	Spain U18	8	(0)
1976–1979	Spain U21	2	(1)

Managerial career
- 2004–2005: Almería B
- 2007–2009: Sangonera
- 2009–2010: Atlético Ciudad
- 2011–2012: Ittihad El Shorta
- 2014: New Radiant
- 2014–2015: Piast Gliwice
- 2017–2018: Nacional Potosí
- * Club domestic league appearances and goals

Ángel Pérez García (16 October 1957 – 16 October 2019) was a Spanish football defender and manager.

== Playing career ==
Born in Madrid, García joined Real Madrid's youth setup in 1973 at the age of 16, after impressing in a trial. He played his first professional match on 3 September 1978, appearing with the reserves in a 1–2 away loss against AD Almería in the Segunda División.

García was promoted to the first team in April 1980, and made his La Liga debut on the 5th by replacing injured Goyo Benito in a 1–0 home victory over Sporting de Gijón. After appearing in only ten league matches during the following campaign, he was loaned to second level club Real Murcia.

García subsequently returned to Real Madrid in the summer of 1982, and was sold to Elche CF also of the second division. After achieving promotion in his second season, he returned to Murcia in 1985, going on to alternate between the top flight and the second tier during his spell.

García left the Estadio de La Condomina in 1991, and joined lower league side CD Roldán. He retired in 1992, aged 34.

== Coaching career ==
In 2004, García was appointed youth coordinator at UD Almería, becoming manager of the reserves the following season. After two years as an instructor of Real Madrid's coaches in Central America, he joined Sangonera Atlético CF as head coach in June 2009.

On 3 December 2009, García was named CF Atlético Ciudad manager. He was sacked in February.

On 12 February 2011, García was appointed at Ittihad El Shorta. He was relieved of his duties the following year, and joined New Radiant SC in the Maldives on 27 November 2013.

On 7 May 2014, García moved to Piast Gliwice. On 18 March 2015, he was dismissed by the Polish club.

== Death ==
García died on 16 October 2019 – the day of his 62nd birthday – in Murcia, due to cancer.
