= Isidro Díaz (footballer, born 1954) =

Spanish footballer

Isidro
Personal information
- Full name: Isidro Díaz González
- Date of birth: 24 May 1954 (age 72)
- Place of birth: Gimialcón, Spain
- Height: 1.76 m (5 ft 9 1/2 in)
- Position: Forward

Youth career
- Real Madrid

Senior career*
Years	Team	Apps	(Gls)
1973–1977	Castilla		
1973–1974	→ Salmantino (loan)		
1977–1985	Real Madrid	140	(10)
1985–1987	Racing Santander	65	(15)
1987–1989	Elche	44	(7)
Total		249	(32)
- * Club domestic league appearances and goals

Isidro Díaz González (born 24 May 1954), known simply as Isidro, is a Spanish former professional footballer who played as a forward.

He appeared in 221 La Liga matches over 11 seasons, scoring 28 goals and representing in the competition Real Madrid, Racing de Santander and Elche.

== Club career ==
Born in Gimialcón, Province of Ávila, Castile and León, Isidro was promoted to the main squad of La Liga giants Real Madrid in 1977, winning three consecutive leagues but totalling only one goal from 46 appearances in his first three years. Barred by the likes of Juanito (who signed in the same season) and Santillana during his spell, he never managed to be a regular starter for the Spanish capital club.

In the 1980–81 edition of the European Cup, Isidro scored both goals in a 2–0 home win over FC Spartak Moscow in the quarter-finals after coming on as a substitute in the second half of the second leg, sealing his team's qualification 2–0 on aggregate. After the 1984–85 campaign, aged 31 and having just won the UEFA Cup, even though he did not appear in any of the final games against Videoton FC, he joined fellow top-flight side Racing de Santander, netting a career-best ten times in his first year – including their 1000th in the competition on 20 April 1986 in the 4–1 home defeat of Hércules CF– but suffering relegation in the following.

Isidro closed out his career aged 35 after two years with Elche CF, being an important attacking unit in 1987–88 as the Valencians promoted from Segunda División. In February 2006, he returned to the Santiago Bernabéu Stadium as youth system coordinator.

== Honours ==
Real Madrid

- La Liga: 1977–78, 1978–79, 1979–80
- Copa del Rey: 1979–80, 1981–82; runner-up: 1978–79, 1982–83
- Copa de la Liga: 1985; runner-up: 1983
- UEFA Cup: 1984–85
- Supercopa de España runner-up: 1982
- European Cup Winners' Cup runner-up: 1982–83
