= Antonio García Navajas =

Spanish footballer

Personal information
- Full name: Antonio García Navajas
- Date of birth: 8 March 1958 (age 68)
- Place of birth: Posadas, Spain
- Height: 1.76 m (5 ft 9 in)
- Position: Defender

Youth career
- Linares

Senior career*
| Years | Team | Apps | (Gls) |
| 1976–1979 | Burgos | 96 | (0) |
| 1979–1982 | Real Madrid | 36 | (0) |
| 1982–1986 | Valladolid | 78 | (0) |
| 1986–1987 | Rayo Vallecano | 21 | (0) |
| 1987–1988 | Poli Almería | 15 | (0) |
| Total | | 246 | (0) |

International career
| 1976 | Spain U18 | 8 | (0) |
| 1977 | Spain U20 | 3 | (0) |
| 1976–1981 | Spain U21 | 8 | (0) |
| 1979 | Spain U23 | 3 | (0) |
| 1979 | Spain amateur | 6 | (0) |
| 1979 | Spain | 1 | (0) |
- * Club domestic league appearances and goals

Antonio García Navajas (born 8 March 1958) is a Spanish former professional footballer who played as a defender.

== Club career ==
Born in Posadas, Province of Córdoba, García Navajas appeared in 210 La Liga matches over ten seasons, in representation of Burgos CF, Real Madrid and Real Valladolid. Whilst with the second club, he won the 1979–80 national championship, but only contributed five matches to the feat; additionally, he made ten appearances in the European Cup in two separate editions.

García Navajas retired in 1988 at the age of 30, after one season in Segunda División with Rayo Vallecano and another in the lower leagues with CP Almería.

== International career ==
On 14 November 1979, García Navajas won his sole cap for the Spain national team, playing the full 90 minutes in a 3–1 friendly loss against Denmark at the Estadio Ramón de Carranza in Cádiz.

== Honours ==
Real Madrid

- La Liga: 1979–80
- Copa del Rey: 1981–82

Valladolid

- Copa de la Liga: 1984
