= Ángel de los Santos =

Spanish footballer (born 1952)

Personal information
- Full name: Ángel de los Santos Cano
- Date of birth: 3 November 1952 (age 73)
- Place of birth: Huelva, Spain
- Height: 1.70 m (5 ft 7 in)
- Position: Midfielder

Senior career*
| Years | Team | Apps | (Gls) |
| 1974–1975 | Recreativo Huelva | 11 | (1) |
| 1975–1976 | San Andrés | 27 | (0) |
| 1976–1977 | Real Jaén | 37 | (2) |
| 1977–1979 | Salamanca | 64 | (1) |
| 1979–1985 | Real Madrid | 161 | (9) |
| 1985–1986 | Salamanca | 30 | (1) |
- * Club domestic league appearances and goals as of 22:54, 23 March 2021 (UTC)

Ángel de los Santos Cano (born 3 November 1952 in Huelva, Spain), sometimes known as just Ángel, is a former Spanish professional association football player who played as a midfielder.

== Honours ==
Real Madrid

- La Liga: 1979–80
- Copa del Rey: 1979–80, 1981–82
- Copa de la Liga: 1985
- UEFA Cup: 1984–85
