= Andrés Sabido =

Spanish footballer

Personal information
- Full name: Andrés Sabido Martín
- Date of birth: 13 November 1957 (age 68)
- Place of birth: Madrid, Spain
- Height: 1.78 m (5 ft 10 in)
- Position: Defender

Youth career
- Real Madrid

Senior career*
Years	Team	Apps	(Gls)
1976–1979	Castilla		
1977–1982	Real Madrid	73	(1)
1982–1985	Mallorca	86	(6)
1985–1988	Osasuna	57	(1)
Total		216	(8)

International career
1976	Spain U18	5	(0)
1978–1979	Spain U21	3	(0)
1980	Spain U23	1	(0)
1979	Spain amateur	2	(0)
- * Club domestic league appearances and goals

Andrés Sabido Martín (born 13 November 1957) is a Spanish former footballer who played as a defender.

== Honours ==
Real Madrid

- La Liga: 1977–78, 1978–79, 1979–80
- Copa del Rey: 1979–80, 1981–82
