= Francisco García Hernández =

Spanish footballer and manager

Personal information
- Full name: Francisco García Hernández
- Date of birth: 8 July 1954 (age 72)
- Place of birth: Madrid, Spain
- Position: Midfielder

Youth career
- Real Madrid

Senior career*
Years	Team	Apps	(Gls)
1974–1978	Castilla		
1974–1976	→ Guadalajara (loan)		
1978–1983	Real Madrid	84	(27)
1983–1988	Castellón	130	(16)
1988–1989	Alzira	15	(0)

International career
1980–1981	Spain B	6	(0)

Managerial career
- 1992: Castellón
- 1993–1994: Real Madrid (youth)
- 1994: Real Madrid B
- 1994–1995: Castellón
- 1996–1997: Real Madrid C
- 1997: Real Madrid B
- 1999–2000: Real Madrid B
- * Club domestic league appearances and goals

Francisco García Hernández (born 8 July 1954 in Madrid) is a Spanish retired footballer who played as a midfielder.

== Playing career ==
After finishing his football formation at the club, García Hernández played five full seasons in La Liga with Real Madrid. During his spell, which began in 1978–79, he played in 22 games or more in three campaigns, being only a fringe player in the remaining two.

Having appeared in 129 official matches with the Merengues and won four major titles, Hernández signed in the 1983 summer with CD Castellón in Segunda División, playing there until his retirement six years later, with the exception of 1988–89 which he spent with fellow league side UD Alzira.

== Manager career ==
From 1992 to 2000, García Hernández worked as a coach, incidentally with his two main clubs. His work in the professional level consisted of 17 games in the second division, six with Castellón in the 1991–92 season and 11 with Real Madrid Castilla in 1993–94.

In the latter campaign, he replaced young Rafael Benítez after he was fired, leading the reserve team to the sixth position.

== Honours ==
Real Madrid

- La Liga: 1978–79, 1979–80
- Copa del Rey: 1979–80, 1981–82

Castellón

- Copa de la Liga (Second Division): 1983–84
