= 1979–80 La Liga =

49th season of La Liga

Primera División
- Season: 1979–80
- Dates: 8 September 1979 – 18 May 1980
- Champions: Real Madrid (20th title)
- Relegated: Rayo Vallecano; Burgos; Málaga
- European Cup: Real Madrid
- UEFA Cup Winners' Cup: Valencia; Castilla CF
- UEFA Cup: Real Sociedad; Sporting Gijón; Barcelona
- Matches: 306
- Goals: 766 (2.5 per match)
- Top goalscorer: Quini (24 goals)
- Biggest home win: Real Madrid 7–0 Rayo Vallecano

The 1979–80 La Liga season was the 49th since its establishment. It began on 8 September 1979, and concluded on 18 May 1980.

Real Madrid achieved their 20th title. They also won the Copa del Rey against their reserve team, Castilla CF; thus Castilla qualified for next season's Cup Winners Cup.

== Overview ==
Once finished the championship on June 20, 1980, the Competition Committee of the Royal Spanish Football Federation quashed the game of the 31st round between Málaga and Salamanca (0–3), considering that it had been rigged, and sanctioned the salmantino club with the deduction of two points. Thus, Salamanca ended in the 14th position with 30 points and with a record of 12 wins, 8 draws and 13 defeats in 33 games, totaling 34 goals for and 37 against. However, a year later, on May 8, 1981, the Higher Committee of Sports Justice of the Superior Sports Council overturned the sanctions due to lack of evidence.

== Teams and locations ==
Location of teams in La Liga 1979–80
Canary Islands

Team	Home city	Stadium
Almería	Almería	Juan Rojas
Athletic Bilbao	Bilbao	San Mamés
Atlético Madrid	Madrid	Vicente Calderón
Barcelona	Barcelona	Nou Camp
Burgos	Burgos	El Plantío
Español	Barcelona	Sarriá
Hércules	Alicante	José Rico Pérez
Las Palmas	Las Palmas	Insular
Málaga	Málaga	La Rosaleda
Rayo Vallecano	Madrid	Vallecas
Real Betis	Seville	Benito Villamarín
Real Madrid	Madrid	Santiago Bernabéu
Real Sociedad	San Sebastián	Atocha
Salamanca	Villares de la Reina	Helmántico
Sevilla	Seville	Ramón Sánchez Pizjuán
Sporting Gijón	Gijón	El Molinón
Valencia	Valencia	Luis Casanova
Zaragoza	Zaragoza	La Romareda

== League table ==
Pos	Team	Pld	W	D	L	GF	GA	GD	Pts	Qualification or relegation
1	Real Madrid (C)	34	22	9	3	70	33	+37	53	Qualification for the European Cup first round
2	Real Sociedad	34	19	14	1	54	20	+34	52	Qualification for the UEFA Cup first round
3	Sporting Gijón	34	16	7	11	47	34	+13	39	Qualification for the UEFA Cup first round
4	Barcelona	34	13	12	9	42	33	+9	38	Qualification for the UEFA Cup first round
5	Real Betis	34	12	12	10	42	40	+2	36	
6	Valencia	34	12	12	10	50	42	+8	36	Qualification for the Cup Winners' Cup first round (Note: Valencia qualified to the Cup Winners' Cup as holders.)
7	Athletic Bilbao	34	15	5	14	52	44	+8	35	
8	Sevilla	34	14	6	14	50	47	+3	34	
9	Salamanca	34	13	8	13	37	37	0	34	
10	Almería	34	11	11	12	41	50	−9	33	
11	Zaragoza	34	13	7	14	43	40	+3	33	
12	Las Palmas	34	13	6	15	36	49	−13	32	
13	Atlético Madrid	34	10	11	13	38	44	−6	31	
14	Español	34	9	12	13	28	37	−9	30	
15	Hércules	34	8	12	14	36	39	−3	28	
16	Rayo Vallecano (R)	34	9	8	17	46	61	−15	26	Relegation to the Segunda División
17	Burgos (R)	34	5	10	19	29	61	−32	20	Relegation to the Segunda División
18	Málaga (Note: Málaga did not show up for the match of the 27th round, against Almería, which was played in Algeciras after Málaga's La Rosaleda Stadium had been closed. The Royal Spanish Football Federation awarded a win to Almería, while Málaga were also penalized with a three-point deduction.) (R)	34	8	6	20	28	58	−30	19	Relegation to the Segunda División

Source: BDFútbol
Rules for classification: 1) Points; 2) Head-to-head results; 3) Goal difference; 4) Number of goals scored
(C) Champions; (R) Relegated

== Results table ==
Home \ Away	ALM	ATH	ATM	BAR	BET	BUR	ESP	HÉR	LPA	MLG	RAY	RMA	RSO	SAL	SEV	SPG	VAL	ZAR
AD Almería		4–2	2–1	1–1	1–1	2–0	1–1	2–0	3–0	3–2	3–3	1–1	0–0	2–0	2–2	0–0	1–0	1–0
Athletic Bilbao	3–0		2–1	2–1	2–2	1–0	2–0	2–1	3–0	3–1	4–1	3–0	0–1	2–0	4–3	2–3	4–0	3–1
Atlético Madrid	4–1	0–1		2–1	3–1	1–0	1–1	2–1	0–0	0–0	2–1	1–1	1–1	0–1	3–2	1–3	0–1	3–0
FC Barcelona	2–0	1–0	1–0		5–0	1–0	3–1	2–0	1–0	3–0	2–1	0–2	0–0	0–0	0–0	0–0	2–1	2–0
Betis	0–0	0–0	0–0	2–1		3–1	2–0	2–0	3–0	2–1	1–2	2–3	1–1	2–0	4–0	1–0	3–0	1–0
Burgos	2–1	1–1	1–1	0–0	1–1		0–0	1–1	2–2	1–0	1–1	1–2	1–3	2–0	1–0	0–3	1–1	0–1
RCD Español	5–2	0–0	0–1	2–0	0–0	1–0		0–0	0–1	1–1	1–0	0–0	1–2	1–1	1–0	1–0	1–1	2–0
Hércules CF	4–0	2–1	2–3	1–1	1–1	3–0	0–1		1–0	1–0	2–2	0–0	0–0	4–0	0–1	1–1	1–1	3–1
UD Las Palmas	3–2	1–1	4–2	0–1	1–0	2–1	1–0	2–1		1–1	3–0	1–2	2–2	1–0	2–0	4–2	2–1	0–0
CD Málaga	0–1 (Note: Awarded)	1–0	1–0	0–0	1–0	3–1	1–2	0–2	1–0		1–3	1–4	0–0	– (Note: See overview)	2–1	0–3	2–1	1–1
Rayo Vallecano	1–2	2–1	4–1	0–0	0–1	5–2	2–2	2–1	1–0	5–1		1–2	1–1	1–2	1–1	1–2	1–0	0–1
Real Madrid	4–1	3–1	4–0	3–2	1–1	2–1	2–0	5–0	3–1	2–1	7–0		2–2	2–0	2–0	1–0	3–1	3–2
Real Sociedad	1–0	4–0	2–0	4–3	0–0	2–2	1–0	1–1	1–0	3–1	4–0	4–0		1–0	2–0	4–1	0–0	2–1
UD Salamanca	2–1	2–1	1–1	1–1	3–0	1–3	2–0	2–1	2–0	3–0	3–0	1–1	0–1		2–1	0–1	1–1	0–1
Sevilla FC	3–1	3–1	2–2	3–1	2–1	6–1	2–1	2–1	0–1	3–1	1–1	1–1	2–1	2–0		1–0	2–1	2–1
Sporting de Gijón	1–0	2–0	0–0	4–1	3–1	2–0	2–0	0–0	4–1	0–1	1–0	1–1	0–1	0–0	2–1		4–2	1–4
Valencia CF	1–1	2–0	2–1	1–1	2–2	3–1	5–1	0–0	4–0	3–1	2–1	2–0	0–0	2–2	2–1	3–1		3–0
Zaragoza	0–0	1–0	0–0	2–2	5–1	5–0	1–1	1–0	4–0	3–1	3–2	0–1	0–2	1–2	1–0	1–0	1–1	

Legend: Blue = home team win; Yellow = draw; Red = away team win.

== Top goalscorers ==
Rank	Player	Club	Goals
1	(Spain) Quini	Sporting Gijón	24
2	(Spain) Santillana	Real Madrid	23
3	(Argentina) Mario Kempes	Valencia	22
4	(Spain) Dani	Athletic Bilbao	21
4	(Uruguay) Fernando Morena	Rayo Vallecano	21
6	(Spain) Pichi Alonso	Zaragoza	20
7	(Spain) Marañón	Espanyol	17
7	(Spain) Jesús María Satrústegui	Real Sociedad	17
9	(Argentina) Daniel Bertoni	Sevilla	16
9	(Argentina) Héctor Scotta	Sevilla	16

La Liga 1979–80 Winners
Real Madrid
20th Title
