= 1988–89 Real Madrid CF season =

87th season in existence of Real Madrid CF

Real Madrid CF
1988–89 season
- Manager: Leo Beenhakker
- La Liga: 1st
- Copa del Rey: Winners
- Supercopa: Winners
- European Cup: Semi-finals
- Top goalscorer: League: Hugo Sánchez (27); All: Hugo Sánchez (36)
Home colours	Away colours

The 1988–89 season was Real Madrid Club de Fútbol's 87th season in existence and the club's 58th consecutive season in the top flight of Spanish football. As of the 2025–26 season, this was the most recent in which the club won a domestic double of La Liga and Copa del Rey and thus the domestic treble if also counting the Supercopa de España.

== Season ==
Real Madrid finished the season as champions for the fourth consecutive season, five points ahead of the runners-up Barcelona. Real Madrid defeated Espanyol 3–0 on 10 June, becoming champions with two rounds remaining in the season. This was its 24th title in history. Real Madrid also won the Copa del Rey and Supercopa, the first time the club accomplished a domestic treble.

== Squad ==
Season's squad: Note: Flags indicate national team as defined under FIFA eligibility rules; some limited exceptions apply. Players may hold more than one non-FIFA nationality.

No.	Pos.	Nation	Player
—	GK	ESP	Francisco Buyo
—	GK	ESP	Agustín
—	GK	ESP	Santiago Cañizares
—	DF	ESP	Chendo
—	DF	ESP	Miguel Tendillo
—	DF	ESP	Manuel Sanchís
—	DF	ESP	Jesús Ángel Solana
—	DF	ESP	Julio Llorente
—	DF	ESP	Esteban Gutierrez
—	DF	ESP	José Antonio Camacho
—	MF	ESP	Adolfo Aldana

No.	Pos.	Nation	Player
—	MF	ESP	Rafael Martín Vázquez
—	MF	ESP	Míchel
—	MF	FRG	Bernd Schuster
—	MF	ESP	Ricardo Gallego
—	MF	ESP	Rafael Gordillo
—	MF	ESP	Paco Llorente
—	MF	ESP	Juan José Sánchez Maqueda
—	FW	MEX	Hugo Sánchez
—	FW	ESP	Emilio Butragueño
—	FW	ESP	Sebastián Losada
—	FW	ESP	Albert Aguilà

=== Transfers ===
In
Pos.	Name	from	Type
MF	Bernd Schuster	FC Barcelona	
FW	Sebastián Losada	RCD Español	
DF	Julio Llorente	RCD Mallorca	
DF	Esteban	Sporting Gijón	

Out
Pos.	Name	To	Type
MF	Milan Janković	RSC Anderlecht	
GK	Canales	Real Madrid Castilla	
DF	Mandiá	RCD Español	
DF	Mino	Sevilla FC	
GK	Ochotorena	Valencia CF	
MF	Santiago Aragon	RCD Español	

== Competitions ==
=== La Liga ===
==== Results by round ====
Round	1	2	3	4	5	6	7	8	9	10	11	12	13	14	15	16	17	18	19	20	21	22	23	24	25	26	27	28	29	30	31	32	33	34	35	36	37	38
Ground	H	A	H	A	H	A	A	H	A	H	A	H	A	H	A	H	A	A	H	A	H	A	H	H	A	H	A	H	A	H	A	H	A	H	A	H	H	H
Result	D	D	D	W	W	W	W	W	W	W	W	D	D	W	W	W	W	W	D	D	W	D	W	W	W	W	D	W	L	W	D	W	D	W	D	W	W	W
Position	9	10	11	8	5	2	2	1	1	1	1	1	2	2	1	1	1	1	1	1	1	1	1	1	1	1	1	1	1	1	1	1	1	1	1	1	1	1

Source: BDFutbol
A = Away; H = Home; W = Win; D = Draw; L = Loss; = Leader, 1989-90 European Cup; = 1989-90 UEFA Cup; = 1989-90 Segunda Division

==== League table ====
Pos	Team	Pld	W	D	L	GF	GA	GD	Pts	Qualification or relegation
1	Real Madrid (C)	38	25	12	1	91	37	+54	62	Qualification for the European Cup first round
2	Barcelona	38	23	11	4	80	26	+54	57	Qualification for the Cup Winners' Cup first round (Note: Qualify for Cup Winners' Cup as holders.)
3	Valencia	38	18	13	7	39	26	+13	49	Qualification for the UEFA Cup first round
4	Atlético Madrid	38	19	8	11	69	45	+24	46	Qualification for the UEFA Cup first round
5	Zaragoza	38	15	13	10	48	42	+6	43	Qualification for the UEFA Cup first round

Source: BDFútbol
(C) Champions

==== Matches ====
4 September 1988 1	Real Madrid	2–2	Osasuna	Madrid
	Vázquez 44'; Schuster 56'	Report	Robinson 17'; Merino 74'	Stadium: Santiago Bernabéu; Referee: Antonio Martin Navarrete

11 September 1988 2	Sporting Gijón	2–2	Real Madrid	Gijón
	Narciso 66'; Villa 83'	Report	Sánchez 14' (pen.); Míchel 22'	Stadium: El Molinon; Referee: Jaime Bayarri Rivelles

18 September 1988 3	Real Madrid	2–2	Real Sociedad	Madrid
	Schuster 8'; Vázquez 64'	Report	Maqueda 59' (o.g.); Loinaz 65'	Stadium: Santiago Bernabéu; Referee: Merino González

25 September 1988 4	Real Betis	0–2	Real Madrid	Seville
		Report	Sánchez 65', 68'	Stadium: Benito Villamarin; Referee: Jose Merino Gonzalez

2 October 1988 5	Real Oviedo	1–3	Real Madrid	Oviedo
	Gorriaran 85'	Report	Butragueno 20', 50'; Míchel 61'	Stadium: Carlos Tartiere; Referee: Martín Navarrete

9 October 1988 6	Real Madrid	4–0	Real Zaragoza	Madrid
	Schuster 6'; Tendillo 61'; Míchel 80'; Vázquez 89'	Report		Stadium: Santiago Bernabéu; Referee: Miguel Marín Lopez

16 October 1988 7	Real Valladolid	0–1	Real Madrid	Valladolid
		Report	Sánchez 52' (pen.)	Stadium: Jose Zorrilla; Referee: Tomas Jimenez Moreno

22 October 1988 8	Real Madrid	3–2	Barcelona	Madrid
	Sánchez 57'; Aldana 59'; Gordillo 81'	Report	Bakero 21'; Carrasco 70'	Stadium: Santiago Bernabéu; Referee: Ildefonso Urizar

30 October 1988 9	Real Murcia	0–3	Real Madrid	Murcia
		Report	Sánchez 53'; Butragueno 73', 77'	Stadium: La Condomina; Referee: Enríquez Negreira

6 November 1988 10	Real Madrid	4–1	Celta Vigo	Madrid
	Vázquez 1'; Gordillo 19'; Sánchez 31'; Sanchis 65'	Report	Amarildo 29'	Stadium: Santiago Bernabéu; Referee: Severiano Perez Sanchez

19 November 1988 11	Logroñés	0–1	Real Madrid	Logroño
		Report	Sánchez 49'	Stadium: Las Gaunas; Referee: Ramos Marcos

26 November 1988 12	Real Madrid	3–3	Athletic Bilbao	Madrid
	Míchel 1', 76'; Tendillo 21'	Report	Ulralde 13'; Fernando 62'; Mendiguren 83'	Stadium: Santiago Bernabéu; Referee: Antonio Taboada Soto

30 November 1988 13	Sevilla	1–1	Real Madrid	Seville
	Polster 38'	Report	Llorente 10'	Stadium: Sanchez Pizjuan; Referee: Urizar Azpitarte

3 December 1988 14	Real Madrid	2–1	Atlético Madrid	Madrid
	Llorente 4'; Vázquez 89'	Report	Manolo 13'	Stadium: Santiago Bernabéu; Referee: Antonio Martin Navarrete

11 December 1988 15	Cádiz	0–2	Real Madrid	Cádiz
		Report	Míchel 35'; Sánchez 86'	Stadium: Ramon de Carranza; Referee: Jose Perez Sanchez

31 December 1988 17	RCD Español	1–4	Real Madrid	Barcelona
	Francisco 22'	Report	Sánchez 57' (pen.), 62', 72'; Butragueno 74'	Stadium: Sarrià; Referee: Jose Merino Gonzalez

8 January 1989 18	Real Madrid	4–2	Elche	Madrid
	Butragueno 58'; Vázquez 77'; Sánchez 88', 89'	Report	Barragan 34'; Sanchez 64'	Stadium: Santiago Bernabéu; Referee: Victoriano Sanchez Arminio

11 January 1989 16	Real Madrid	2–1	CD Málaga	Madrid
	Butragueno 15'; Gallaego 89'	Report	Chendo 50' (o.g.)	Stadium: Santiago Bernabéu

14 January 1989 19	Valencia	1–1	Real Madrid	Valencia
	Eloy 30'	Report	Aldana 64'	Stadium: Luis Casanova; Referee: Miguel Marín Lopez

28 January 1989 20	Osasuna	1–1	Real Madrid	Pamplona
	Gomez 34'	Report	Sánchez 85'	Stadium: El Sadar; Referee: Jose Socorro Gonzalez
Note: The match, originally played at 28 January 1989, had to be abruptly stopped at the 43th minute due to the fans throwing fireworks at Paco Buyo. It was resumed on 3 May 1989, at La Romareda in Zaragoza.

12 February 1989 21	Real Madrid	5–1	Sporting Gijón	Madrid
	Gordillo 7'; Míchel 9', 70', 85'; Sánchez 89'	Report	Felipe 44'	Stadium: Santiago Bernabéu; Referee: Joaquin Urio Velazquez

19 February 1989 22	Real Sociedad	1–1	Real Madrid	San Sebastián
	Goikoetxea 84'	Report	Vázquez 32'	Stadium: Atotxa; Referee: José Pajarez Paz

25 February 1989 23	Real Madrid	5–1	Real Betis	Madrid
	Butragueno 7', 65'; Gordillo 38'; Míchel 59'; Sánchez 78' (pen.)	Report	Ufarte 77' (pen.)	Stadium: Santiago Bernabéu; Referee: Jose Miguel Perez

5 March 1989 24	Real Madrid	1–0	Real Oviedo	Madrid
	Parralo 60' (o.g.)	Report		Stadium: Santiago Bernabéu; Referee: Eusebio Alvarez Diaz

11 March 1989 25	Real Zaragoza	1–4	Real Madrid	Zaragoza
	Villarroya 50'	Report	Sánchez 15', 28'; Schuster 83'; Losada 89'	Stadium: La Romareda

26 March 1989 26	Real Madrid	3–2	Real Valladolid	Madrid
	Sánchez 7'; Sanchis 25'; Butragueno 66'	Report	Peña 49'; Patri 81'	Stadium: Santiago Bernabéu; Referee: Juan Andújar Oliver

1 April 1989 27	Barcelona	0–0	Real Madrid	Barcelona
		Report		Stadium: Camp Nou; Referee: Ramos Marcos

9 April 1989 28	Real Madrid	3–0	Real Murcia	Madrid
	Míchel 30'; Schuster 67'; Sánchez 83'	Report		Stadium: Santiago Bernabéu; Referee: Riera Morro

15 April 1989 29	Celta Vigo	2–0	Real Madrid	Vigo
	Amarildo 1', 26'	Report		Stadium: Balaídos; Referee: Jose Perez Sanchez

30 April 1989 30	Real Madrid	1–0	Logroñés	Madrid
	Sánchez 45'	Report		Stadium: Santiago Bernabéu; Referee: Jose Benavente Garasa

7 May 1989 31	Athletic Bilbao	1–1	Real Madrid	Bilbao
	Mendiguren 48'	Report	Sánchez 82'	Stadium: San Mamés; Referee: Angel Calvo Cordova

14 May 1989 32	Real Madrid	3–0	Sevilla	Madrid
	Míchel 30'; Butragueno 40', 61'	Report		Stadium: Santiago Bernabéu; Referee: Juan Peralta Ibañez

20 May 1989 33	Atlético Madrid	3–3	Real Madrid	Madrid
	Baltazar 28', 30', 84'	Report	Schuster 46'; Butragueno 72'; Losada 75'	Stadium: Vicente Calderón; Referee: Jose Merino Gonzalez

28 May 1989 34	Real Madrid	4–0	Cádiz	Madrid
	Gordillo 24'; Sanchis 51'; Sánchez 64'; Butragueno 83'	Report		Stadium: Santiago Bernabéu; Referee: Urizar Azpitarte

4 June 1989 35	CD Málaga	2–2	Real Madrid	Málaga
	Ruiz 34'; Juanito 67'	Report	Sánchez 12' (pen.), 79'	Stadium: La Rosaleda; Referee: Urío Velázquez

11 June 1989 36	Real Madrid	3–0	Espanyol	Madrid
	Butragueno 28'; Sánchez 62'; Gordillo 89'	Report		Stadium: Santiago Bernabéu; Referee: Andújar Oliver

18 June 1989 37	Elche	1–3	Real Madrid	Elche
	Isidro 13'	Report	Solana 26'; Lorente 44'; Losada 49'	Stadium: Manuel Martínez Valero; Referee: Sánchez Molina Soto

23 June 1989 38	Real Madrid	2–1	Valencia	Madrid
	Míchel 7'; Schuster 45'	Report	Eloy 67'	Stadium: Santiago Bernabéu; Referee: Díaz Vega

=== Copa del Rey ===
==== Fifth round ====
24 January 1989	Elche CF	1–2	Real Madrid CF	Elche
21:00 CET		Report (in Spanish)		Referee: García de Loza

31 January 1989	Real Madrid CF	1–1	Elche CF	Madrid
21:00 CET		Report (in Spanish)		Stadium: Santiago Bernabéu; Attendance: 20,000; Referee: Enríquez Negreira

==== Eightfinals ====
15 February 1989	Sporting Gijón	5–5	Real Madrid CF	Gijón
21:00 CET		Report (in Spanish)		Stadium: Estadio El Molinon; Referee: García de Loza

21 February 1989	Real Madrid CF	5–2	Sporting Gijón	Madrid
21:00 CET		Report (in Spanish)		Stadium: Santiago Bernabéu; Attendance: 20,000; Referee: Enríquez Negreira

==== Quarter-finals ====
28 March 1989	Real Madrid CF	4–1	Celta Vigo	Madrid
20:30 CET		Report (in Spanish)		Stadium: Estadio Santiago Bernabéu; Referee: Pes Pérez

10 May 1989	Celta Vigo	1–0	Real Madrid CF	Vigo
21:00 CET		Report (in Spanish)		Stadium: Estadio Balaídos; Attendance: 30,000; Referee: Valdés Sánchez

==== Semi-finals ====
6 June 1989	Atlético Madrid	0–2	Real Madrid CF	Madrid
21:00 CET		Report (in Spanish)		Stadium: Estadio Vicente Calderón; Attendance: 60,000; Referee: Merino González

20 June 1989	Real Madrid CF	1–0 (3–0 agg.)	Atlético Madrid	Madrid
21:00 CET		Report (in Spanish)		Stadium: Estadio Santiago Bernabéu; Referee: Merino González

==== Final ====
30 June 1989	Real Madrid CF	1–0	Real Valladolid	Madrid
21:00 CET	Gordillo 5'	Report (in Spanish)		Stadium: Estadio Vicente Calderón; Referee: Victoriano Sanchez Arminio

=== European Cup ===
==== First round ====
6 September 1988	Real Madrid CF (Spain)	3–0	(Norway) Moss FK	Madrid
	Losada 20'; Tendillo 29'; Butragueno 32'	Report		Stadium: Estadio Santiago Bernabéu; Referee: Paolo Casarin

5 October 1988	Moss FK (Norway)	0–1	(Spain) Real Madrid CF	Moss
	Butragueno 39'	Report		Stadium: Mellos Stadion; Referee: Alain Delmer

==== Eightfinals ====
26 October 1988	Górnik Zabrze (Poland)	0–1	(Spain) Real Madrid CF	Chorzów
17:30		Report	Sánchez 65' (pen.)	Stadium: Silesian Stadium; Attendance: 62,500; Referee: Bob Valentine

10 November 1988	Real Madrid CF (Spain)	3–2	(Poland) Górnik Zabrze	Madrid
21:00	Sánchez 27'; Butragueno 77'; Sánchez 84'	Report	Jegor 41'; Baran 54'	Stadium: Estadio Santiago Bernabéu; Attendance: 37,500; Referee: Dieter Pauly

==== Quarter-finals ====
28 February 1989	PSV Eindhoven (Netherlands)	1–1	(Spain) Real Madrid	Eindhoven
17:30	Romario 53'	Report	Butragueno 45'	Stadium: Philips Stadion; Attendance: 90,000; Referee: Keith Hackett

14 March 1989	Real Madrid (Spain)	2–1 (a.e.t.) (3–2 agg.)	(Netherlands) PSV Eindhoven	Madrid
20:00	Sánchez 72' (pen.); Vázquez 105'	Report	Romario 84'	Stadium: Santiago Bernabéu Stadium; Attendance: 100,000; Referee: Siegfried Kirschen

==== Semi-finals ====
4 April 1989	Real Madrid CF (Spain)	1–1	(Italy) A.C. Milan	Madrid
19:15	Sánchez 41'	Report	Van Basten 74'	Stadium: Estadio Santiago Bernabéu; Attendance: 75,000; Referee: Bob Valentine

18 April 1989	A.C. Milan (Italy)	5–0 (6–1 agg.)	(Spain) Real Madrid CF	Milan
20:00	Ancelotti 18'; Rijkaard 25'; Gullit 45'; Van Basten 49'; Donadoni 59'	Report		Stadium: San Siro; Attendance: 100,000; Referee: Michel Vautrot

=== Supercopa ===
21 September 1988	Real Madrid	2–0	Barcelona	Madrid
21:30 CET	Míchel 51'; Hugo Sánchez 78'			Stadium: Santiago Bernabéu; Attendance: 70,000; Referee: Urizar Azpitarte

29 September 1988	Barcelona	2–1 (2–3 agg.)	Real Madrid	Barcelona
21:15 CET	Bakero 37', 78'		Butragueño 15'	Stadium: Camp Nou; Attendance: 55,000; Referee: José Donato Pes Pérez

== Statistics ==
=== Squad statistics ===
competition	points	total						DR
competition	points	G	V	N	P	Gf	Gs	DR
La Liga	56	34	26	4	4	83	33	+50
Copa del Rey	–	6	4	1	1	14	6	+8
UEFA Cup	–	12	6	1	5	26	16	+10
Total		52	36	6	10	113	55	+58

=== Players statistics ===
No.	Pos	Nat	Player	Total		La Liga		Copa del Rey		European Cup	
No.	Pos	Nat	Player	Apps	Goals	Apps	Goals	Apps	Goals	Apps	Goals
	GK	(Spain) ESP	Buyo	46	-47	31	-28	8	-10	7	-9
	DF	(Spain) ESP	Chendo	38	0	24+2	0	7	0	5	0
	DF	(Spain) ESP	Tendillo	41	3	25+2	2	5+2	0	6+1	1
	DF	(Spain) ESP	Gallego	42	2	25+2	1	8+1	1	6	0
	DF	(Spain) ESP	Sanchís	49	4	33	3	9	1	7	0
	MF	(Spain) ESP	Vázquez	52	8	34+2	7	7+1	0	8	1
	MF	(Spain) ESP	Míchel	49	14	36	13	7+1	1	5	0
	MF	(West Germany) FRG	Schuster	50	10	33	7	9	3	8	0
	MF	(Spain) ESP	Gordillo	49	7	32+2	6	6+1	1	8	0
	FW	(Mexico) MEX	Sanchez	48	36	35	27	5+1	4	7	5
	FW	(Spain) ESP	Butragueño	47	21	33	15	6	2	7+1	4
	GK	(Spain) ESP	Agustín	9	-11	7	-9	1	-1	1	-1
	DF	(Spain) ESP	Esteban	40	1	25+4	0	6	1	5	0
	DF	(Spain) ESP	Solana	31	1	16+5	1	5+1	0	4	0
	MF	(Spain) ESP	Llorente	38	1	10+15	1	3+3	0	2+5	0
	DF	(Spain) ESP	J. Llorente	16	2	6+6	2	1	0	1+2	0
	DF	(Spain) ESP	Camacho	9	0	5+2	0	0+1	0	0+1	0
	MF	(Spain) ESP	Aldana	17	4	4+9	2	2+1	2	0+1	0
	MF	(Spain) ESP	Maqueda	6	0	2+3	0	0+1	0		
	FW	(Spain) ESP	Losada	14	9	2+7	3	4	5	1	1
	FW	(Spain) ESP	Albert Aguilà	1	0	0+1	0				
	GK	(Spain) ESP	Cañizares	0	0	0	0	0	0	0	0

- Source: https://www.bdfutbol.com/en/t/t1988-892.html

== See also ==
La Quinta del Buitre
