= 1984–85 Real Madrid CF season =

83rd season in existence of Real Madrid CF

Real Madrid CF
1984–85 season
- Chairman: Luis de Carlos (until 23 May 1985); Ramón Mendoza
- Manager: Amancio Amaro (until 16 April 1985); Luis Molowny (from 16 April)
- Stadium: Santiago Bernabéu
- La Liga: 5th
- Copa del Rey: Round of 16
- Copa de la Liga: Winners
- UEFA Cup: Winners
- Top goalscorer: League: Jorge Valdano (17); All: Jorge Valdano (23)
Home colours	Away colours

The 1984–85 Real Madrid Club de Fútbol season was the club's 83rd season in existence and their 54th consecutive season in the top flight of Spanish football.

== Summary ==
The club announced a new coach Amancio Amaro on 21 May 1984. A former Madrid player, Amancio trained reserve team Castilla the last two seasons. The managerial change was a sign of President Luis de Carlos beginning to accelerate the transitional stage of "La Quinta del Buitre" which Amancio managed himself. The team was reinforced with Argentine forward Jorge Valdano from Real Zaragoza, with goalkeeper Otxotorena and young midfielder Michel being promoted from Castilla.

During September a players labour strike occurred, and Real Madrid played the second round on 9 September 1984 with its reserve team. However, a Federal Court suspended the third round until clubs and football players reach an agreement, which was signed two weeks later and the league championship was restarted again. After four seasons without a League title and a bad streak of results during this campaign, chairman Luis de Carlos, facing the pressure from the Board of Directors, anticipated the Presidential Election one year early, instead of 1986. On 1 May 1985, former vice-president Ramón Mendoza remained as the sole candidate to the election after the other two challengers Eduardo Peña and Juanito Navarro declined.

Finally, on 24 May 1985, Luis de Carlos appointed Mendoza as new president. In addition to La Liga, Real Madrid also competed in the Copa del Rey, the Copa de la Liga, and the UEFA Cup. Madrid secured their first ever UEFA Cup trophy with a win over Hungarian side Videoton in the final after 19 years without a continental title. By defeating city rivals Atlético in the final of the Copa de la Liga, Real also secured their first and only title in that competition. In the Copa del Rey, the club was again defeated by Athletic Bilbao.

== Squad ==
Note: Flags indicate national team as defined under FIFA eligibility rules; some limited exceptions apply. Players may hold more than one non-FIFA nationality.

No.	Pos.	Nation	Player
—	GK	ESP	Miguel Ángel
—	GK	ESP	Otxotorena
—	GK	ESP	Mariano García Remón
—	GK	ESP	Agustín Rodríguez
—	DF	ESP	Chendo
—	DF	ESP	Isidoro San José
—	DF	ESP	Manuel Sanchís
—	DF	ESP	Alfonso Fraile
—	DF	ESP	José Antonio Salguero
—	DF	ESP	Juan José
—	DF	ESP	Paco Bonet
—	DF	ESP	José Antonio Camacho

No.	Pos.	Nation	Player
—	MF	ESP	Míchel
—	MF	FRG	Uli Stielike
—	MF	ESP	Ricardo Gallego
—	MF	ESP	Rafael Martín Vázquez
—	MF	ESP	Ángel
—	MF	ESP	Juan Lozano
—	FW	ESP	Emilio Butragueño
—	FW	ARG	Jorge Valdano
—	FW	ESP	Santillana
—	FW	ESP	Juanito
—	FW	ESP	Francisco Pineda
—	FW	ESP	Isidro

=== Transfers ===
In
Pos.	Name	from	Type
FW	Jorge Valdano	Real Zaragoza	
MF	Míchel	Castilla	
GK	Otxotorena	Castilla	

Out
Pos.	Name	To	Type
MF	Bernardo	Sporting Gijón	
DF	John Metgod	Nottingham Forest	
MF	Vicente del Bosque		retired
FW	Julio Suarez	Elche CF	
DF	Juan Alberto Acosta	Newell's Old Boys	
FW	Laurie Cunningham	Olympique Marseille	
FW	Cholo	Real Zaragoza	loan
FW	Ito	Real Valladolid	
DF	Juan Carcelen	Hércules CF	

== Competitions ==
=== La Liga ===
==== Position by round ====
Round	1	2	3	4	5	6	7	8	9	10	11	12	13	14	15	16	17	18	19	20	21	22	23	24	25	26	27	28	29	30	31	32	33	34
Ground	H	A	H	A	H	A	A	H	A	H	A	H	A	H	A	H	A	A	H	A	H	A	H	H	A	H	A	H	A	H	A	H	A	H
Result	L	D	W	L	W	D	W	D	W	W	L	W	W	D	W	W	D	L	D	D	L	D	D	L	D	W	L	W	L	W	W	L	L	L
Position	18	13	15	12	9	8	9	6	5	3	3	3	2	2	2	2	2	2	2	2	3	3	3	3	5	4	4	4	5	5	4	5	5	5

Source: www.lfp.es
A = Away; H = Home; W = Win; D = Draw; L = Loss; = 1985-86 European Cup; = 1985-86 UEFA Cup; = 1985-86 Segunda Division

==== League table ====
Pos	Team	Pld	W	D	L	GF	GA	GD	Pts	Qualification or relegation
3	Athletic Bilbao	34	13	15	6	39	26	+13	41	Qualification for the UEFA Cup first round
4	Sporting Gijón	34	13	15	6	34	23	+11	41	Qualification for the UEFA Cup first round
5	Real Madrid	34	13	10	11	46	36	+10	36	Qualification for the UEFA Cup first round
6	Osasuna	34	13	8	13	38	38	0	34	Qualification for the UEFA Cup first round
7	Real Sociedad	34	11	12	11	41	33	+8	34	

Source: BDFútbol
Rules for classification: 1) Points; 2) Head-to-head results; 3) Goal difference; 4) Number of goals scored

==== Matches ====
2 September 1984 1	Real Madrid	0–3	FC Barcelona	Madrid
	Juanito (yellow card); Lozano (yellow card); Bonet (yellow card)	Report	Angel 46' (o.g.); Archibald 86'; Caldere 89'; Muñoz (yellow card)	Stadium: Santiago Bernabeu; Referee: Ildefonso Aspitare

9 September 1984 2	Sporting Gijón	1–1	Real Madrid	Gijón
	Eloy 16'; Blanco (yellow card)	Report	Fernandez 33'; Fuentes (yellow card)	Stadium: El Molinon; Referee: Miguel Lopez
Note: The match was played with youth and amateur players due to an ongoing strike caused by professional players.

23 September 1984 4	Sevilla CF	1–0	Real Madrid	Sevilla
	Serna 72' (yellow card); Lopez (yellow card)	Report	San Jose (yellow card); Chendo (yellow card)	Stadium: Sanchez Pizjuan; Referee: Joaquin Marcos

30 September 1984 5	Real Madrid	3–0	Racing Santander	Madrid
	Pineda 21'; Sanchis 71'; Michel 81'	Report	(yellow card) Tino	Stadium: Santiago Bernabeu; Referee: Francisco Borrego

7 October 1984 6	Athletic Bilbao	0–0	Real Madrid	Bilbao
	Liceranzo (yellow card); Sola (yellow card); Nunez (yellow card)	Report	Butragueno (yellow card); Stielike (yellow card)	Stadium: San Mames; Referee: Felipe Aurre

12 October 1984 7	Real Zaragoza	0–2	Real Madrid	Zaragoza
	Barbas (yellow card); Herrera (yellow card); Cholo (yellow card)	Report	Sanchis 23'; Lozano 50'; Camacho (yellow card); Pineda (yellow card); Angel Warned	Stadium: La Romareda; Referee: Jose Garaza

20 October 1984 8	Real Madrid	0–0	CD Málaga	Madrid
	Stielike (yellow card); Lozano (yellow card); Camacho (yellow card); Gallego (yellow card)	Report	Albis (yellow card); Mikanovich (yellow card)	Stadium: Santiago Bernabeu; Referee: Juan Ibanez

28 October 1984 9	Elche CF	0–1	Real Madrid	Elche
	Belanche (yellow card)	Report	63' Butragueno; (yellow card) Stielike	Stadium: Campo Altabix; Referee: Jose Gonzalez

1 November 1984 3(*)	Real Madrid	2–0	Real Valladolid	Madrid
	Valdano 4'; Sanchis 66'; Chendo (yellow card)	Report	Victor (yellow card)	Stadium: Santiago Bernabeu; Referee: Jose Garaza
Note: The match was originally scheduled for 16 September 1984, but was postponed due to a strike caused by professional players.

4 November 1984 10	Real Madrid	4–1	Español	Madrid
	Valdano 15'; Valdano 35'; Valdano 44'; Santillana 49'	Report	39' Pineda	Stadium: Santiago Bernabeu; Referee: Juan Oliver

18 November 1984 11	Real Betis	4–1	Real Madrid	Sevilla
	Parra 6'; Rincon 38' 82' (yellow card); Romo 43' (yellow card); Alex (yellow card)	Report	Valdano 74' (pen.) (yellow card); Chendo (yellow card) 87' (yellow-red card); Sanchis (yellow card)	Stadium: Benito Villamarin; Referee: Teodoro Sanchez

21 November 1984 12	Real Madrid	1–0	Osasuna	Madrid
	Santillana 89' (yellow card)	Report	Castaneda (yellow card); Dioni (yellow card)	Stadium: Santiago Bernabeu; Referee: Jose Gonzalez

25 November 1984 13	Real Murcia	0–1	Real Madrid	Murcia
	Sanchez (yellow card); Sebas (yellow card)	Report	Valdano 30' (pen.); Vasquez (yellow card)	Stadium: La Condomina; Referee: Manuel Marquenda

2 December 1984 14	Real Madrid	1–1	Real Sociedad	Madrid
	Lozano 89'	Report	63' Ufarte	Stadium: Santiago Bernabeu; Referee: Felipe Aurre

8 December 1984 15	Atlético Madrid	0–1	Real Madrid	Madrid
	Tomas (yellow card); Prieto (yellow card)	Report	Valdano 81'; Gallego (yellow card); Michel (yellow card); Stielike (yellow card)	Stadium: Vicente Calderon; Referee: Joaquin Marcos

16 December 1984 16	Real Madrid	1–0	Valencia CF	Madrid
	Valdano 23'; Michel (yellow card); Sanchis (yellow card)	Report		Stadium: Santiago Bernabeu; Referee: Miguel Lopez

23 December 1984 17	Hércules CF	2–2	Real Madrid	Alicante
	Rocamora 19'; Ramos 37'; Rastrojo (yellow card); Cartagena (yellow card); Abel (yellow card)	Report	Valdano 20'; Butragueno 67'; Gallego (yellow card); Michel (yellow card)	Stadium: Jose Rico; Referee: Ildefonso Aspitare

30 December 1984 18	FC Barcelona	3–2	Real Madrid	Barcelona
	Miranda 23'; Muñoz (yellow card) 35' (yellow-red card); Miguel 53'; Vigo 79'; Schuster (yellow card); Carrasco (yellow card); Caldere (yellow card)	Report	Sanchis 30'; Butrageno 89'; Camacho (yellow card); Stielike (yellow card); Valdano (yellow card)	Stadium: Camp Nou; Referee: Joaquin Marcos

6 January 1985 19	Real Madrid	0–0	Sporting Gijón	Madrid
		Report	(yellow card) Maceda	Stadium: Santiago Bernabeu; Referee: Francesc Rifa

13 January 1985 20	Real Valladolid	1–1	Real Madrid	Valladolid
	Alonso 83' (pen.)	Report	74' Gallego	Stadium: José Zorrilla; Referee: Jose Garaza

20 January 1985 21	Real Madrid	1–2	Sevilla CF	Madrid
	Santillana 29'; Stielike (yellow card); San Jose (yellow card)	Report	Lopez 35' (yellow card); San Jose 48' (o.g.); Jimenez (yellow card); Alvarez (yellow card); Magdaleno (yellow card) 88' (yellow-red card)	Stadium: Santiago Bernabeu; Referee: Teodoro Sanchez

27 January 1985 22	Racing Santander	0–0	Real Madrid	Madrid
	Setien (yellow card)	Report	(yellow card) Stielike	Stadium: Santiago Bernabeu; Referee: Sebastian Rendon

3 February 1985 23	Real Madrid	2–2	Athletic Bilbao	Madrid
	Michel 48' (yellow card); Salguero Goal 80 (yellow card); Gallego (yellow card); Sanchis (yellow card)	Report	Salinas 56'; Urtubi 84'; Endika (yellow card); De Andres (yellow card)	Stadium: Santiago Bernabeu; Referee: Felipe Aurre

10 February 1985 24	Real Madrid	1–2	Real Zaragoza	Madrid
	Butrageno 70'; Michel (yellow card) 87' (yellow-red card)	Report	Amarilla 77'; Corchado 82'	Stadium: Santiago Bernabeu; Referee: Jose Gonzalez

17 February 1985 25	CD Málaga	1–1	Real Madrid	Málaga
	Toto 13'; Hurtado (yellow card)	Report	Butrageno 70'; Stielike (yellow card)	Stadium: La Rosaleda; Referee: Emilio Muro

20 February 1985 26	Real Madrid	6–1	Elche CF	Madrid
	Butrageno 23'; Valdano 36'; Valdano 52'; Valdano 60'; Valdano 80'; Santillana 89'; Angel (yellow card)	Report	Barragan 61'; Garcia (yellow card); Belanche (yellow card); De Lucas (yellow card)	Stadium: Santiago Bernabeu; Referee: Jose Garaza

3 March 1985 27	Español	2–0	Real Madrid	Barcelona
	Pineda 39'; Pineda 75'; N'Kono (yellow card)	Report	Angel (yellow card)	Stadium: Sarria; Referee: Victoriano Arminio

10 March 1985 28	Real Madrid	3–2	Real Betis	Madrid
	Valdano 4'; Valdano 30'; Pineda 70'	Report	Calderon 35'; Calderon 89' (pen.)	Stadium: Santiago Bernabeu; Referee: Eusebio Diaz

17 March 1985 29	Osasuna	1–0	Real Madrid	Pamplona
	Lumberas 35'	Report	Pineda (yellow card)	Stadium: El Sadar; Referee: Jose Gonzalez

24 March 1985 30	Real Madrid	5–0	Real Murcia	Madrid
	Valdano 12'; Pineda 17'; Butragueno 37'; Butragueno 47'; Butragueno 56'; Lozano (yellow card)	Report	(yellow card) Figueroa	Stadium: Estadio Santiago Bernabéu; Referee: Manuel Marquenda

30 March 1985 31	Real Sociedad	0–3	Real Madrid	San Sebastián
	Murillo (yellow card); Garate (yellow card)	Report	Salguero 34'; Butragueño 65'; Valdano 89'	Stadium: Atotxa; Referee: Angel Martinez

7 April 1985 32	Real Madrid	0–4	Atlético Madrid	Madrid
	Gallego (yellow card); Angel (red card) 45'	Report	Sanchez 3'; Marina 11' (yellow card); Cabrera 82'; Cabrera 89'; Tomas (yellow card); Landaburu (yellow card)	Stadium: Santiago Bernabeu; Referee: Felipe Aurre

14 April 1985 33	Valencia CF	1–0	Real Madrid	Valencia
	Castellanos 20'	Report	Fraile (yellow card); Jose (yellow card)	Stadium: Mestalla; Referee: Joaquin Velazquez

21 April 1985 34	Real Madrid	0–1	Hércules CF	Madrid
	Gallego (yellow card)	Report	Sanabria 72'; Baquero (yellow card); Latorre (yellow card); Casero (yellow card)	Stadium: Santiago Bernabeu; Referee: Ildefonso Aspitare

=== Copa del Rey ===
==== Round of 16 ====
13 March 1985 1st Leg	Real Madrid	1–0	Athletic Bilbao	Madrid
21:00 CET	Pineda 82'	Report (in Spanish)		Stadium: Santiago Bernabéu; Referee: Ramos Marcos (Castile and León)

3 April 1985 2nd Leg	Athletic Bilbao	2–0 (a.e.t.) (2–1 agg.)	Real Madrid	Bilbao
20:15 CET	Goikoetxea 10'; Julio Salinas 94'	Report (in Spanish)		Stadium: San Mamés; Referee: García de Loza (Galicia (Spain))

=== Copa de la Liga ===
Real Madrid was given a bye until the quarter-finals.

==== Quarter-finals ====
11 May 1985 1st Leg	Barcelona	2–2	Real Madrid	Barcelona
	Clos 40'; Marcos 44'	Report	Valdano 67'; Juanito 75'	Stadium: Camp Nou

18 May 1985 2nd Leg	Real Madrid	1–1 (3–3 agg.) (4–1 p)	Barcelona	Madrid
	Valdano 83'	Report	Moratalla 57'	Stadium: Santiago Bernabéu
	Penalties
	Valdano (penalty scored); San José (penalty scored); Butragueño (penalty scored); Juanito (penalty scored)		(penalty missed) Carrasco; (penalty missed) Gerardo; (penalty scored) Marcos

==== Semi-finals ====
30 May 1985 1st leg	Sporting de Gijón	3–1	Real Madrid	Gijón
	Quini 20' (pen.); Mino 51'; Esteban 57'	Report	Míchel 36'	Stadium: El Molinón; Referee: Sánchez Arminio

2 June 1985 2nd leg	Real Madrid	3–0 (4–3 agg.)	Sporting de Gijón	Madrid
	Santillana 29', 36'; Pineda 59'; Juanito (yellow card) 0' (yellow-red card) 88'	Report		Stadium: Santiago Bernabéu; Referee: Enríquez Negreira

==== Final ====
5 June 1985 1st Leg	Atlético Madrid	3–2	Real Madrid	Madrid
	Rubio 10'; Arteche 57'; Cabrera 59'	Report	Pineda 48'; Santillana 79'	Stadium: Vicente Calderón; Attendance: 40,000; Referee: Urío Velázquez

15 June 1985 2nd Leg	Real Madrid	2–0 (4–3 agg.)	Atlético Madrid	Madrid
	Stielike 23'; Míchel 62'	Report		Stadium: Santiago Bernabéu; Attendance: 65,000; Referee: Crespo Aurré

=== UEFA Cup ===
==== First round ====
19 September 1984 1st Leg	Real Madrid (Spain)	5–0	(Austria) SSW Innsbruck	Madrid, Spain
21:00	Míchel 3', 56'; Santillana 6'; Chendo (yellow card) 51'; Juanito 52' (pen.); Butragueño 54'	Report	Jørgensen (yellow card) 21'; Hovenkamp (yellow card) 86'	Stadium: Santiago Bernabéu; Attendance: 55,000; Referee: Siegfried Kirschen (East Germany)

3 October 1984 2nd Leg	SSW Innsbruck (Austria)	2–0 (2–5 agg.)	(Spain) Real Madrid	Innsbruck, Austria
20:00	Roscher 20', 64' (yellow card) 32'	Report	Camacho (yellow card) 32'	Stadium: Tivoli-Stadion; Attendance: 4,500; Referee: László Pádár (Hungary)

==== Second round ====
24 October 1984 1st Leg	HNK Rijeka (Croatia)	3–1	(Spain) Real Madrid	Rijeka, Croatia
18:00	Malbaša (yellow card) 11'; Fegić 30', 57'; Matrljan 40'	Report	Sanchís (yellow card) 67'; Isidro 81'	Stadium: Stadion Kantrida; Attendance: 25,000; Referee: Keith Hackett (England)

7 November 1984 2nd Leg	Real Madrid (Spain)	3–0 (4–3 agg.)	(Croatia) HNK Rijeka	Madrid, Spain
21:00	San José (yellow card) 6'; Stielike (yellow card) 32'; Valdano (yellow card) 42' (goal) 82'; Juanito 67' (pen.); Santillana 79'	Report	Milenković (yellow card) 2' (yellow-red card) 34'; Desnica (yellow card) 10' (yellow-red card) 74'; Juričić (yellow card) 30'; Ravnić (yellow card) 46'; Tičić (red card) 88'	Stadium: Santiago Bernabéu; Attendance: 55,000; Referee: Roger Schoeters (Belgium)

==== Third round ====
28 November 1984 1st Leg	Anderlecht (Belgium)	3–0	(Spain) Real Madrid	Brussels, Belgium
20:00	Vandenbergh 71' (pen.); Czerniatynski 72' (yellow card) 72'; Vercauteren 86'	Report	Chendo (yellow card) 27'; Alfonso Sánchez (yellow card) 55'; Míchel (yellow card) 89'	Stadium: Constant Vanden Stock; Attendance: 41,000; Referee: Volker Roth (West Germany)

12 December 1984 2nd Leg	Real Madrid (Spain)	6–1 (6–4 agg.)	(Belgium) Anderlecht	Madrid, Spain
21:00	Sanchís 2'; Lozano (yellow card) 7'; Butragueño 16', 47', 49'; Valdano 28', 38'	Report	Arnesen 33'	Stadium: Santiago Bernabéu; Attendance: 95,000; Referee: Michel Vautrot (France)

==== Quarter-finals ====
6 March 1985 1st Leg	Tottenham Hotspur (England)	0–1	(Spain) Real Madrid	London, England
21:00		Report	Perryman 15' (o.g.)	Stadium: White Hart Lane; Attendance: 39,914; Referee: Paolo Casarin (Italy)

20 March 1985 2nd Leg	Real Madrid (Spain)	0–0 (1–0 agg.)	(England) Tottenham Hotspur	Madrid, Spain
21:00	Míchel (yellow card) 90'	Report	Perryman (red card) 78'	Stadium: Santiago Bernabéu; Attendance: 95,000; Referee: Bruno Galler (Switzerland)

==== Semi-finals ====
10 April 1985 1st Leg	Inter Milan (Italy)	2–0	(Spain) Real Madrid	Milan, Italy
19:00	Brady 26' (pen.); Altobelli 57'; Marini (yellow card) 88'	Report	Sanchís (yellow card) 44'; Isidro (yellow card) 73'	Stadium: Giuseppe Meazza; Attendance: 75,521; Referee: Franz Wöhrer (Austria)

24 April 1985 2nd Leg	Real Madrid (Spain)	3–0 (3–2 agg.)	(Italy) Inter Milan	Madrid, Spain
21:00	Santillana 12', 42'; Gallego (yellow card) 42'; Míchel 59'; Sánchez (yellow card) 61'	Report	Mandorlini (yellow card) 11'; Sabato (yellow card) 47'; Pasinato (yellow card) 73'	Stadium: Santiago Bernabéu; Attendance: 90,200; Referee: Bob Valentine (Scotland)

==== Final ====
8 May 1985 1st Leg	Videoton (Hungary)	0–3	(Spain) Real Madrid	Székesfehérvár, Hungary
20:00		Report	Míchel 31'; Santillana 77'; Valdano 89'	Stadium: Sóstói Stadion; Attendance: 35,000; Referee: Michel Vautrot (France)

22 May 1985 2nd Leg	Real Madrid (Spain)	0–1 (3–1 agg.)	(Hungary) Videoton	Madrid, Spain
21:00		Report	Májer 86'	Stadium: Estadio Santiago Bernabéu; Attendance: 98,300; Referee: Alexis Ponnet (Belgium)

== Statistics ==
=== Players statistics ===
No.	Pos	Nat	Player	Total		La Liga		Copa del Rey		Copa de la Liga		UEFA Cup	
No.	Pos	Nat	Player	Apps	Goals	Apps	Goals	Apps	Goals	Apps	Goals	Apps	Goals
	GK	(Spain) ESP	Miguel Ángel	47	-52	30	-32	2	-2	3	-6	12	-12
	DF	(Spain) ESP	Chendo	43	0	25	0	1	0	6	0	11	0
	DF	(Spain) ESP	San Jose	40	0	21+3	0	0	0	4+1	0	8+3	0
	DF	(Spain) ESP	Sanchís	47	5	27+3	4	1	0	6	0	9+1	1
	DF	(Spain) ESP	Camacho	53	0	33	0	2	0	6	0	12	0
	MF	(Spain) ESP	Míchel	43	8	26	2	2	0	6	2	9	4
	MF	(West Germany) FRG	Stielike	41	1	25	0	0	0	6	1	10	0
	MF	(Spain) ESP	Gallego	47	1	23+5	1	2	0	6	0	9+2	0
	FW	(Spain) ESP	Butragueño	44	14	23+6	10	2	0	2	0	9+2	4
	FW	(Argentina) ARG	Valdano	40	23	26	17	2	0	2	2	10	4
	FW	(Spain) ESP	Santillana	37	12	15+7	4	2	0	5	3	7+1	5
	GK	(Spain) ESP	Otxotorena	7	-6	2+1	-3	0	0	3+1	-3	0	0
	DF	(Spain) ESP	Fraile	24	0	16	0	1	0	0+2	0	4+1	0
	DF	(Spain) ESP	Salguero	28	2	13+5	2	2	0	2	0	4+2	0
	FW	(Spain) ESP	Juanito	30	3	7+10	0	0+1	0	4+1	1	2+5	2
	FW	(Spain) ESP	Pineda	27	6	11+6	3	2	1	4	2	3+1	0
	MF	(Spain) ESP	Lozano	21	2	12+2	2	0	0	0	0	6+1	0
	GK	(Spain) ESP	Agustín	2	0	1+1	0	0	0	0	0	0	0
	MF	(Spain) ESP	Vazquez	20	0	9+4	0	0	0	0+2	0	3+2	0
	MF	(Spain) ESP	Ángel	14	0	8+2	0	2	0	0	0	2	0
	FW	(Spain) ESP	Isidro	17	1	4+6	0	1	0	1+2	0	1+2	1
	DF	(Spain) ESP	Juan José	4	0	3	0	0	0	0+1	0	0	0
	DF	(Spain) ESP	Bonet	4	0	3	0	0	0	0	0	1	0
	GK	(Spain) ESP	Remón	0	0	0	0	0	0	0	0	0	0

=== Squad during strike ===
No.	Pos	Nat	Player	Total		1984–85 La Liga	
No.	Pos	Nat	Player	Apps	Goals	Apps	Goals
	FW	(Spain) ESP	Bugallo	1	0	1	0
	FW	(Spain) ESP	Fernando	1	0	1	0
	FW	(Spain) ESP	Sebastián Losada	1	0	1	0
	DF	(Spain) ESP	Eusebio	1	0	1	0
	MF	(Spain) ESP	Salmerón	1	0	1	0
	FW	(Spain) ESP	Azcona	1	1	1	1
	MF	(Spain) ESP	Míchel	1	0	1	0
	DF	(Spain) ESP	Geni	1	0	1	0
	DF	(Spain) ESP	Sanchez Clemente	1	0	1	0
	MF	(Spain) ESP	Bernardo	1	0	1	0
	MF	(Spain) ESP	Marquez	1	0	1	0
	FW	(Spain) ESP	Hurtado	1	0	1	0
	GK	(Spain) ESP	Canales	1	1	1	1

== See also ==
La Quinta del Buitre
