= José Antonio Camacho =

Spanish footballer (born 1955)

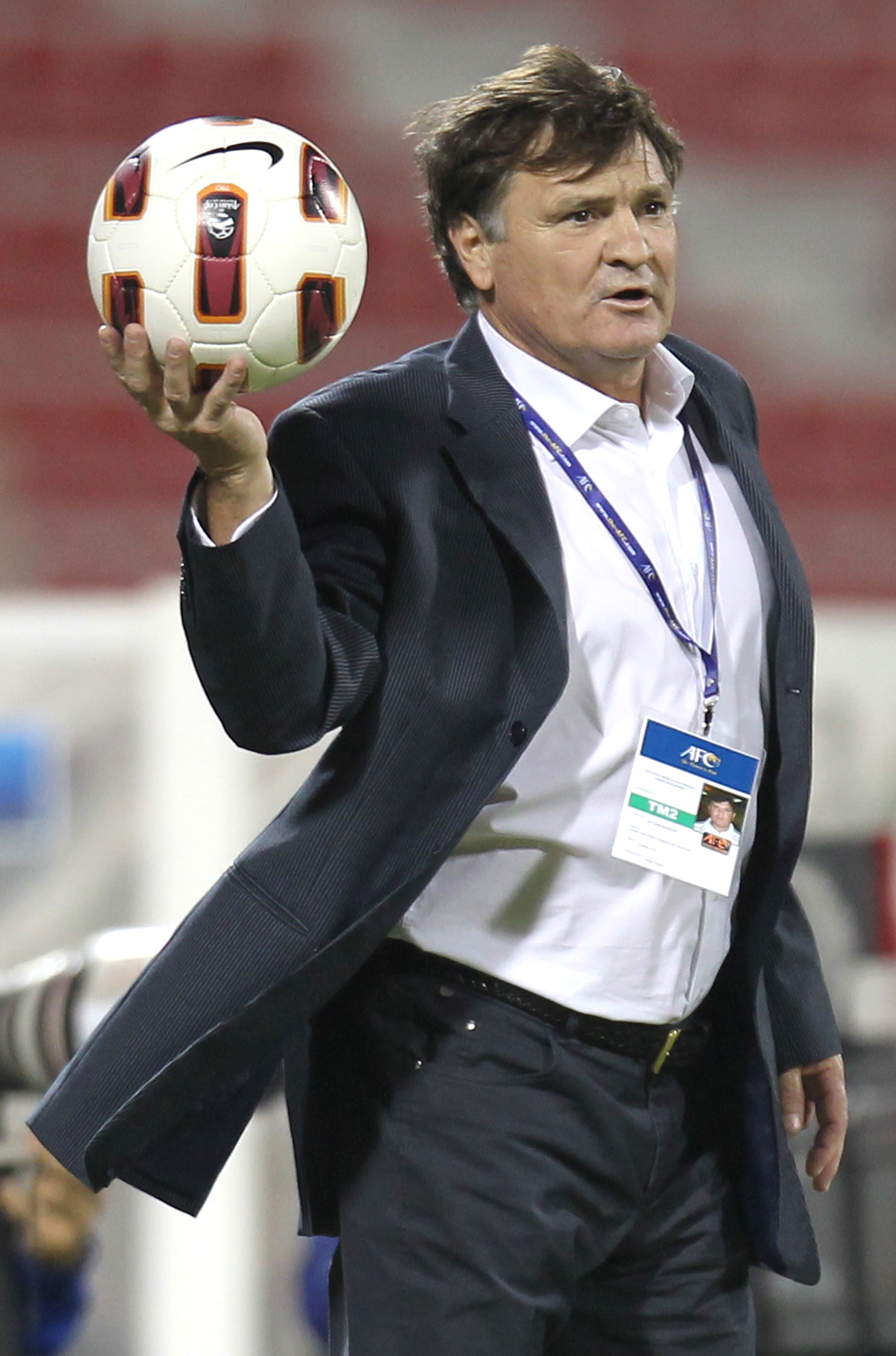
- Camacho in 2011

Personal information
- Full name: José Antonio Camacho Alfaro
- Date of birth: 8 June 1955 (age 71)
- Place of birth: Cieza, Spain
- Height: 1.74 m (5 ft 9 in)
- Position: Left-back

Youth career
- Albacete

Senior career*
Years	Team	Apps	(Gls)
1972–1973	Albacete		
1973–1974	Castilla		
1974–1989	Real Madrid	414	(9)

International career
1973	Spain U18	3	(0)
1975–1976	Spain amateur	2	(0)
1975–1988	Spain	81	(0)

Managerial career
- 1989–1992: Real Madrid (assistant)
- 1992–1993: Rayo Vallecano
- 1993–1996: Espanyol
- 1996–1997: Sevilla
- 1997–1998: Espanyol
- 1998: Real Madrid
- 1998–2002: Spain
- 2002–2004: Benfica
- 2004: Real Madrid
- 2007–2008: Benfica
- 2008–2011: Osasuna
- 2011–2013: China
- 2016–2018: Gabon
Medal record
Representing Spain
UEFA European Championship
Runner-up	1984 France
- * Club domestic league appearances and goals

José Antonio Camacho Alfaro (Spanish pronunciation: [xose anˈtonjo kaˈmatʃo]; born 8 June 1955) is a Spanish former football left-back and a former manager.

He spent 15 professional years at Real Madrid, appearing in more than 500 official matches with the team and helping win 19 major titles, including nine La Liga championships. Subsequently, he embarked in a lengthy manager career, which included two very brief spells with his main club.

Camacho earned more than 80 caps with Spain, representing the country in two World Cups and as many European Championships. He also managed the national team for four years, taking them to the quarter-finals in the 2002 World Cup.

== Club career ==
Camacho was born in Cieza, Murcia. Began his football career playing in the schoolyards and streets of Cieza, where he gradually developed his skills and stood out among his peers. At the age of six, he moved with his family to Albacete. During this period, the family considered returning to their native province, and he even underwent trials for the youth academy of Real Murcia; however, the club’s coaches opted for other players, reportedly claiming that Camacho was too slight in build. Ultimately, the family decided to remain in Albacete. His footballing promise began to crystallize at the age of sixteen, when he played for Atlético Jareño, a club based in Villanueva de la Jara, in the province of Cuenca (the hometown of his future wife), before joining the youth team of Albacete Balompié, where he was deployed as a left winger. The name of the young José Antonio Camacho soon began to circulate within Spanish football circles, and national team manager Héctor Rial called him up to the Spain national under-18 team. His impressive performances earned him promotion to Albacete Balompié’s first team, which at the time competed in the Primera Regional division.

After playing at Albacete, he moved to La Liga giants Real Madrid at age 18, being almost immediately cast into the first team and its starting XI, his debut being handed by manager Luis Molowny on 3 March 1974 as he played the full 90 minutes in a 1–0 away loss against Málaga.

During his spell with Real Madrid, Camacho appeared in 577 official matches (414 in the league alone), forming a proficient left-wing partnership with Rafael Gordillo, who featured mainly as a midfielder. In January 1978, he suffered a serious injury in training, which put his career on hold for nearly two years, but returned strong, being instrumental as the capital side won consecutive UEFA Cups.

== International career ==
Camacho played 81 games for the Spain national team, making his first appearance just 19 years old. His debut came on 5 February 1975 in a 1–1 draw against Scotland for the UEFA Euro 1976 qualifiers, in Valencia.

For the following 13 years, Camacho was a defensive mainstay for the national side, being selected – and always as first-choice – to the 1982 and 1986 FIFA World Cups, as well as Euro 1984 and 1988. After the 2–0 group stage loss to West Germany in the latter competition, he retired from the international scene aged 33.

== Coaching career ==
=== Beginnings ===
Following his retirement as a player in 1989, Camacho began coaching, first in Real Madrid's coaching staff. His first professional experiences were spent at Rayo Vallecano and Espanyol, both of which he helped promote to the top division.

In the summer of 1998, Camacho took over Real Madrid's first team, but left after only 22 days over disagreements with the club's management.

=== Spain national team ===
Camacho succeeded Javier Clemente as national team manager in September 1998, after a shock 3–2 loss in Cyprus in a Euro 2000 qualifier. The tide quickly turned under the new boss, who led the side to the final stages where they bowed out to eventual champions France in the quarter-finals.

Two years later, Camacho's team lost in the same stages to South Korea, now in the 2002 World Cup. Following the controversial defeat he announced his resignation, being replaced by Iñaki Sáez.

=== Benfica ===
Camacho returned to club action subsequently, being appointed at Benfica from Portugal on 1 December 2002 in the place of sacked Jesualdo Ferreira. Two years later, his team won the Taça de Portugal against José Mourinho-led Porto in extra-time, ending Benfica's longest silverware drought, as well as finishing second in the Primeira Liga.

A tough tackler in his playing days, Camacho also showed a human side when he cried profusely after Miklós Fehér died on the pitch, shortly after entering Benfica's match at Vitória de Guimarães.

=== Real Madrid and Benfica return ===
For the 2004–05 season, Camacho returned to Real Madrid on a two-year contract as a replacement to sacked Carlos Queiroz. However, things quickly went wrong again in his second spell after a 3–0 defeat at Bayer Leverkusen in the group stage of the UEFA Champions League, and a 1–0 league loss at Espanyol four days later also in September; shortly after, he resigned and was replaced by assistant Mariano García Remón.

Following Fernando Santos' mutual agreement termination of contract with Benfica, after a 1–1 away draw with Leixões in 2007–08 Portuguese League's opener, Camacho returned to Benfica. However, following a poor string of results, and claiming he was no longer able to motivate the team, he announced he would leave the club minutes after drawing a home match against bottom-placed União de Leiria on 9 March 2008.

=== Osasuna ===
After working as co-commentator on Spanish TV network Cuatro during Spain's victorious Euro 2008 campaign (he would also work for the channel during the 2010 World Cup, which ended with the national team's triumph as well), Camacho replaced José Ángel Ziganda at the helm of Osasuna on 13 October 2008.

On 14 February 2011, following a 1–0 away loss against Real Sociedad that placed the Navarrese inside the relegation zone, Camacho was fired. They eventually finished in ninth position.

=== China national team ===
On 13 August 2011, Camacho took over the reins of the Chinese national team, signing a three-year deal for a reported annual salary of US$8 million. The Chinese Football Association head Wei Di explained the decision as being part of a long-term plan to help the country catch up with Japan and South Korea, while Chinese Soccer Administrative Centre vice-president Yu Hongchen said that Camacho would keep his job even if he did not qualify for the 2014 FIFA World Cup.

China failed to qualify for the World Cup, after only finishing third in the third qualifying round with three wins and three losses. Camacho was also in charge as a Chinese young squad lost 8–0 to Brazil on 10 September 2012 in a friendly match, the national team's worst-ever defeat which also meant the drop to an all-time low 109th position in the FIFA World Rankings.

In the first game of the 2015 AFC Asian Cup qualification campaign, Camacho and China lost 1–2 against Saudi Arabia. Following a 5–1 shock friendly loss to Thailand on 15 June 2013, he was relieved of his duties.

One reason cited for Camacho's shortcomings in Asia was the limitation of football boots. The Chinese FA ordered that all the national team players were to wear Adidas, whilst most players in the Chinese Super League wore Nike, thus creating discomfort.

=== Gabon national team ===
Camacho was appointed as Gabon manager 43 days before the start of the 2017 Africa Cup of Nations which was to take place in that country, replacing Jorge Costa. The team exited in the group stage, with three draws.

Camacho was relieved of his duties on 12 September 2018, due to poor results.

== Career statistics ==
=== Club ===
Appearances and goals by club, season and competition
Club	Season	League			Copa del Rey		Copa de la Liga		Europe		Other		Total	
Club	Season	Division	Apps	Goals	Apps	Goals	Apps	Goals	Apps	Goals	Apps	Goals	Apps	Goals
Real Madrid	1973–74	La Liga	5	0	0	0	—		—		—		5	0
Real Madrid	1974–75	La Liga	34	0	7	1	—		6 (Note: Appearances in European Cup Winners' Cup)	0	—		47	1
Real Madrid	1975–76	La Liga	33	1	2	0	—		8 (Note: Appearances in European Cup)	0	—		43	1
Real Madrid	1976–77	La Liga	32	2	2	0	—		4	0	—		38	2
Real Madrid	1977–78	La Liga	15	2	4	0	—		—		—		19	2
Real Madrid	1978–79	La Liga	0	0	0	0	—		0	0	—		0	0
Real Madrid	1979–80	La Liga	33	0	3	0	—		8	0	—		44	0
Real Madrid	1980–81	La Liga	34	0	4	0	—		9	0	—		47	0
Real Madrid	1981–82	La Liga	33	2	7	0	—		8 (Note: Appearances in UEFA Cup)	0	—		48	2
Real Madrid	1982–83	La Liga	34	1	7	0	4	0	8	0	2 (Note: Appearance in Supercopa de España)	0	55	1
Real Madrid	1983–84	La Liga	30	1	8	1	0	0	2	0	—		40	2
Real Madrid	1984–85	La Liga	33	0	2	0	6	0	12	0	—		53	0
Real Madrid	1985–86	La Liga	29	0	4	0	0	0	12	0	—		45	0
Real Madrid	1986–87	La Liga	32	0	2	0	—		8	0	—		42	0
Real Madrid	1987–88	La Liga	30	0	8	0	—		4	0	—		42	0
Real Madrid	1988–89	La Liga	7	0	1	0	—		1	0	0	0	9	0
Real Madrid	Career total		414	9	61	2	10	0	90	0	2	0	577	11

=== International ===
Appearances and goals by national team and year
National team	Year	Apps	Goals
Spain
Spain	1975	3	0
Spain	1976	3	0
Spain	1977	6	0
Spain	1978	0	0
Spain	1979	1	0
Spain	1980	0	0
Spain	1981	13	0
Spain	1982	10	0
Spain	1983	7	0
Spain	1984	12	0
Spain	1985	7	0
Spain	1986	11	0
Spain	1987	4	0
Spain	1988	4	0
Total		81	0

=== Managerial ===
As of match played 14 February 2020

Managerial record by team and tenure
Team	Nat	From	To	Record								Ref
Team	Nat	From	To	G	W	D	L	GF	GA	GD	Win %	Ref
Rayo Vallecano	(Spain)	27 January 1992	20 June 1993	59	20	23	16	76	60	+16	33.90	
Espanyol	(Spain)	1 July 1993	27 May 1996	138	63	46	29	213	118	+95	45.65	
Sevilla	(Spain)	5 June 1996	3 February 1997	25	7	4	14	20	33	−13	28.00	
Espanyol	(Spain)	23 June 1997	17 June 1998	40	12	18	10	46	34	+12	30.00	
Real Madrid	(Spain)	17 June 1998	9 July 1998	0	0	0	0	0	0	+0	—	
Spain	(Spain)	15 September 1998	23 June 2002	44	28	9	7	105	37	+68	63.64	
Benfica	(Portugal)	1 December 2002	25 May 2004	71	47	14	10	133	60	+73	66.20	
Real Madrid	(Spain)	25 May 2004	20 September 2004	6	4	0	2	7	5	+2	66.67	
Benfica	(Portugal)	20 August 2007	9 March 2008	38	18	13	7	57	29	+28	47.37	
Osasuna	(Spain)	13 October 2008	14 February 2011	105	30	29	46	107	133	−26	28.57	
China	(China)	13 August 2011	24 June 2013	20	7	2	11	23	31	−8	35.00	
Gabon	(Gabon)	2 December 2016	12 September 2018	16	2	8	6	9	16	−7	12.50	
Career total				562	238	166	158	796	556	+240	42.35	—

== Honours ==
=== Player ===
Real Madrid

- La Liga: 1974–75, 1975–76, 1977–78, 1978–79, 1979–80, 1985–86, 1986–87, 1987–88, 1988–89
- Copa del Rey: 1973–74, 1974–75, 1979–80, 1981–82, 1988–89
- Supercopa de España: 1988, 1989
- Copa de la Liga: 1985
- UEFA Cup: 1984–85, 1985–86

Spain

- UEFA European Championship runner-up: 1984

=== Manager ===
Benfica

- Taça de Portugal: 2003–04

== See also ==
- List of La Liga players (400+ appearances)
- List of Real Madrid CF records and statistics
