= Emilio Butragueño =

Spanish footballer (born 1963)

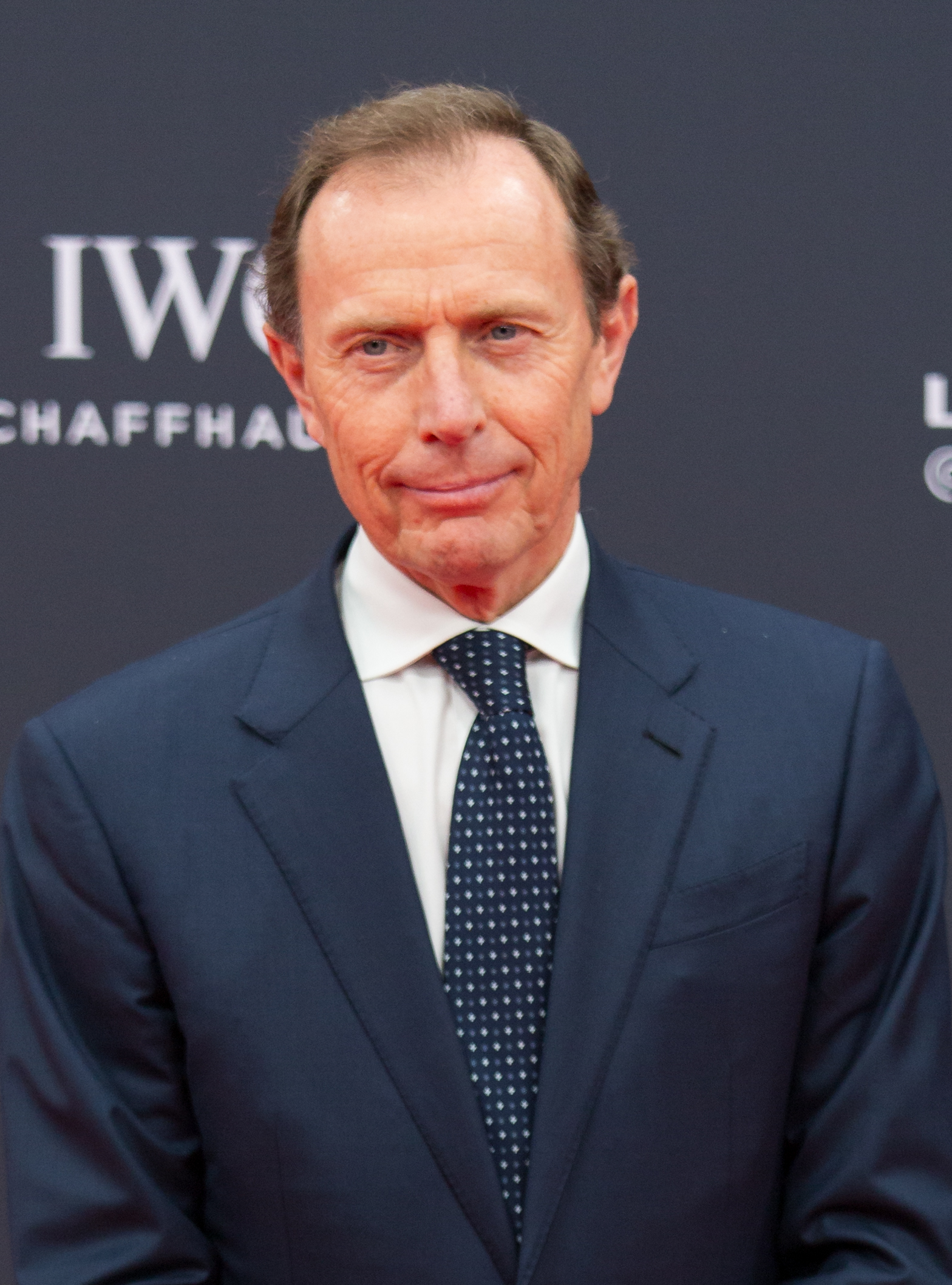
- Butragueño in 2024

Personal information
- Full name: Emilio Butragueño Santos
- Date of birth: 22 July 1963 (age 63)
- Place of birth: Madrid, Spain
- Height: 1.70 m (5 ft 7 in)
- Position: Striker

Youth career
- Casariche
- 1981–1982: Real Madrid

Senior career*
Years	Team	Apps	(Gls)
1982–1984	Real Madrid B	65	(37)
1984–1995	Real Madrid	341	(123)
1995–1998	Celaya	91	(29)
Total		497	(189)

International career
1983–1984	Spain U21	5	(2)
1984	Spain amateur	1	(1)
1984–1992	Spain	69	(26)
Medal record
Representing Spain
UEFA European Championship
Runner-up	1984 France
- * Club domestic league appearances and goals

Emilio Butragueño Santos (Spanish pronunciation: [eˈmiljo βutɾaˈɣeɲo ˈsantos]; born 22 July 1963) is a Spanish former professional footballer who played as a striker.

He was best known for his spell with Real Madrid. Nicknamed El Buitre (The Vulture), he was a member of the La Quinta del Buitre along with Manolo Sanchís, Rafael Martín Vázquez, Míchel and Miguel Pardeza.

Butragueño scored 123 La Liga goals in 341 games for his main club over 12 seasons, and represented the Spain national team in two World Cups (being the second-top scorer in the 1986 edition) and as many European Championships, scoring 26 goals for his country in a record that stood for several years.

== Club career ==
In 1981, Madrid-born Butragueño joined the Real Madrid youth system, playing first for their reserves before being given his senior debut by Alfredo Di Stéfano on 5 February 1984 against Cádiz CF: he made an instant impact, scoring twice and assisting for the third goal in a 3–2 away comeback win. On 12 December that year he made his European competition debut, contributing with a hat-trick to a 6–1 home victory over RSC Anderlecht in the third round of the UEFA Cup after the 3–0 loss in Brussels, as the Spaniards went on to win the competition.

At the time, Real Madrid's form was so patchy the first team's attendances were smaller than those of the reserve side. Butragueño was a part of their transformation, being a prominent member of the squad during the 1980s and winning numerous honours: he received the European Bronze award for best footballer in two consecutive years, and was awarded the Pichichi Trophy in 1991, while also being instrumental in the capital club's five La Liga trophies, two Copa del Rey and two consecutive UEFA Cups.

In June 1995, having lost his place (only eight games and one goal, as Real won another league), mainly due to the emergence of 17-year-old Raúl, Butragueño signed for Atlético Celaya in Mexico and, in his first year, the team reached the final of the Liga MX. After three seasons where he was known as the Gentleman of the Pitch – never receiving a single red card during his entire career – he decided to retire in April 1998.

== International career ==
Butragueño earned 69 caps for Spain, and scored 26 goals. His debut came on 17 October 1984 against Wales in a 1986 FIFA World Cup qualifier, and he closed the 3–0 win in Seville. He had already been picked as an uncapped player for the UEFA Euro 1984 tournament, where his team finished runners-up.

Butragueño was also selected for the 1986 World Cup where he played a major part, scoring four goals as Spain beat Denmark 5–1 in the round-of-16 match. He also took part in the 1990 edition in Italy, scoring no goals in four games.

Butragueño left the national team after playing two games in the 1994 World Cup qualifiers, aged 29. His last appearance was on 18 November 1992, in a 0–0 draw with the Republic of Ireland.

== Style of play ==
Widely regarded as one of the best strikers of his generation, Butragueño was known for his intelligence, movement and finishing ability on the pitch.

== Post-retirement and other ventures ==
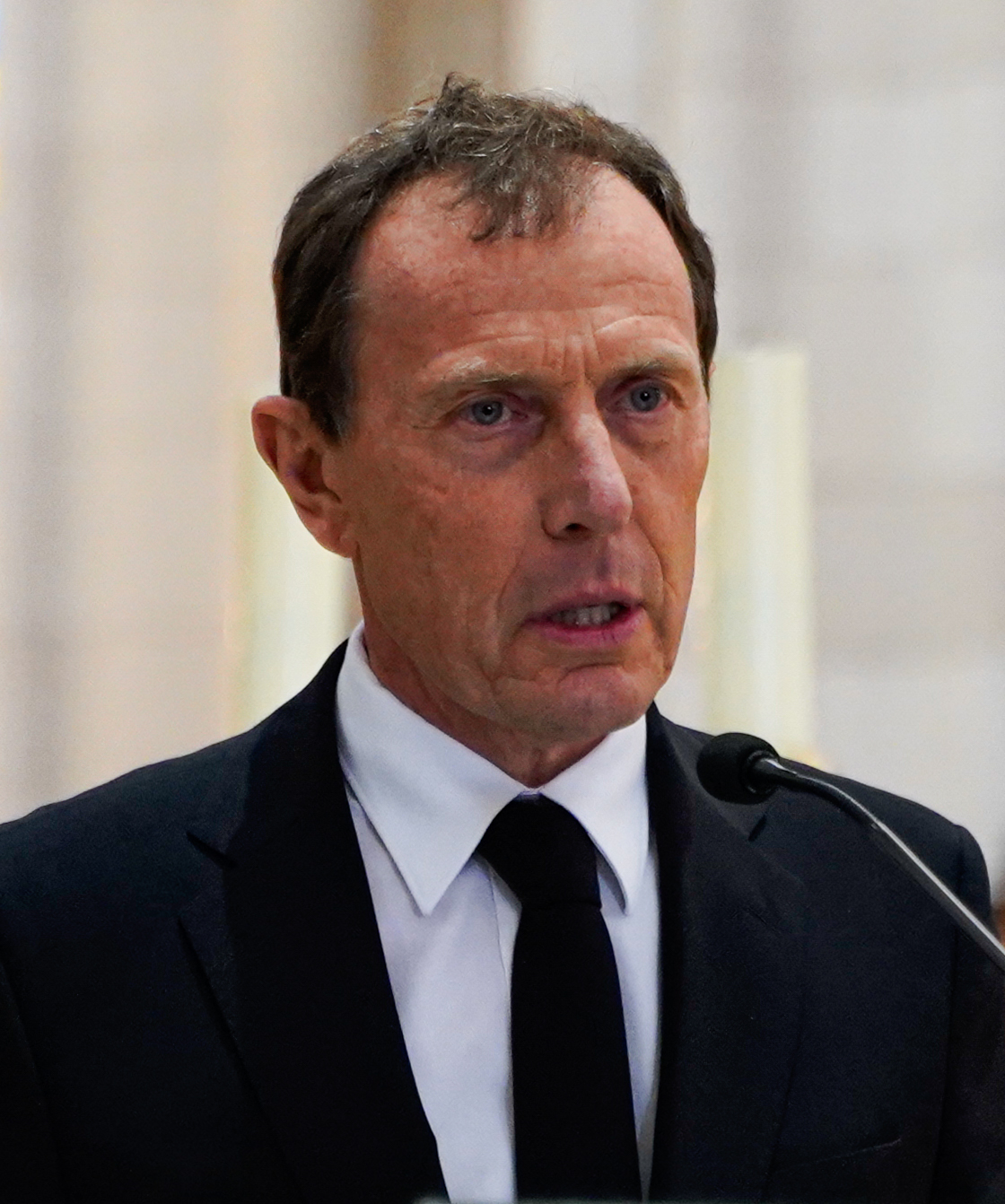
Butragueño in 2022

On 19 October 2004, Butragueño replaced former Real Madrid teammate Jorge Valdano as the club's director of football and, until the end of the 2005–06 season, also served as its vice-president. Subsequently, he acted as head of public relations for the organisation.

Still as a player, Butragueño had a computer game with his name released in 1988, for the Amstrad CPC, Commodore 64, ZX Spectrum and MSX.

== Career statistics ==
=== Club ===
Appearances and goals by club, season and competition
Club	Season	League			National cup		League cup		Continental		Other		Total	
Club	Season	Division	Apps	Goals	Apps	Goals	Apps	Goals	Apps	Goals	Apps	Goals	Apps	Goals
Castilla	1981–82	Segunda División	6	3	0	0	0	0	–		–		6	3
Castilla	1982–83	Segunda División	38	13	4	0	3	0	–		–		45	13
Castilla	1983–84	Segunda División	21	21	10	3	0	0	–		–		31	24
Castilla	Total		65	37	14	3	3	0	0	0	4	3	82	40
Real Madrid	1983–84	La Liga	10	4	0	0	2	2	—		—		12	6
Real Madrid	1984–85	La Liga	29	10	0	0	2	0	11 (Note: Appearances in UEFA Cup)	4	—		42	14
Real Madrid	1985–86	La Liga	31	10	6	2	0	0	12	2	—		49	14
Real Madrid	1986–87	La Liga	35	11	3	3	—		7 (Note: Appearances in European Cup)	5	—		45	19
Real Madrid	1987–88	La Liga	32	12	3	0	—		8	2	—		43	14
Real Madrid	1988–89	La Liga	33	15	5	2	—		8	4	2	1	48	22
Real Madrid	1989–90	La Liga	32	10	6	2	—		2	2	—		40	14
Real Madrid	1990–91	La Liga	35	19	2	0	—		4	4	2	2	43	25
Real Madrid	1991–92	La Liga	35	14	6	4	—		9	1	—		50	19
Real Madrid	1992–93	La Liga	34	9	3	1	—		6	1	—		43	11
Real Madrid	1993–94	La Liga	27	8	2	1	—		4 (Note: Appearances in UEFA Cup Winners' Cup)	2	—		33	11
Real Madrid	1994–95	La Liga	8	1	0	0	—		4	0	—		12	1
Real Madrid	Total		341	123	36	15	4	2	75	27	4	3	460	170
Celaya	1995–96	Liga MX	34	17	—		—		—		—		34	17
Celaya	1996–97	Liga MX	26	2	—		—		—		—		26	2
Celaya	1997–98	Liga MX	31	10	—		—		—		—		31	10
Celaya	Total		91	29	—		—		—		—		91	29
Career total			497	189	50	18	7	2	75	27	4	3	633	239

=== International ===
Scores and results list Spain's goal tally first, score column indicates score after each Butragueño goal.

List of international goals scored by Emilio Butragueño
No.	Date	Venue	Opponent	Score	Result	Competition
1	17 October 1984	Benito Villamarín, Seville, Spain	Wales	3–0	3–0	1986 World Cup qualification
2	23 January 1985	Rico Pérez, Alicante, Spain	Finland	2–0	3–1	Friendly
3	23 January 1985	Rico Pérez, Alicante, Spain	Finland	3–0	3–1	Friendly
4	19 February 1986	Martínez Valero, Elche, Spain	Belgium	1–0	3–0	Friendly
5	26 March 1986	Ramón de Carranza, Cádiz, Spain	Poland	1–0	3–0	Friendly
6	7 June 1986	Tres de Marzo, Guadalajara, Mexico	Northern Ireland	1–0	2–1	1986 FIFA World Cup
7	18 June 1986	La Corregidora, Querétaro, Mexico	Denmark	1–1	5–1	1986 FIFA World Cup
8	18 June 1986	La Corregidora, Querétaro, Mexico	Denmark	2–1	5–1	1986 FIFA World Cup
9	18 June 1986	La Corregidora, Querétaro, Mexico	Denmark	4–1	5–1	1986 FIFA World Cup
10	18 June 1986	La Corregidora, Querétaro, Mexico	Denmark	5–1	5–1	1986 FIFA World Cup
11	15 October 1986	Niedersachsenstadion, Hanover, Germany	West Germany	1–0	2–2	Friendly
12	18 February 1987	Santiago Bernabéu, Madrid, Spain	England	1–0	2–4	Friendly
13	23 September 1987	Nou Castalia, Castellón, Spain	Luxembourg	2–0	2–0	Friendly
14	1 June 1988	El Helmántico, Villares de la Reina, Spain	Sweden	1–0	1–3	Friendly
15	11 June 1988	Niedersachsenstadion, Hanover, Germany	Denmark	2–1	3–2	UEFA Euro 1988
16	12 October 1988	Ramón Sánchez Pizjuán, Seville, Spain	Argentina	1–0	1–1	Friendly
17	16 November 1988	Benito Villamarín, Seville, Spain	Republic of Ireland	2–0	2–0	1990 World Cup qualification
18	21 December 1988	Sánchez Pizjuán, Seville, Spain	Northern Ireland	2–0	4–0	1990 World Cup qualification
19	15 November 1989	Sánchez Pizjuán, Seville, Spain	Hungary	2–0	4–0	1990 World Cup qualification
20	28 March 1990	La Rosaleda, Málaga, Spain	Austria	2–0	2–3	Friendly
21	26 May 1990	Bežigrad, Ljubljana, Yugoslavia	Yugoslavia	1–0	1–0	Friendly
22	10 October 1990	Benito Villamarín, Seville, Spain	Iceland	1–0	2–1	Euro 1992 qualifying
23	19 December 1990	Sánchez Pizjuán, Seville, Spain	Albania	3–0	9–0	Euro 1992 qualifying
24	19 December 1990	Sánchez Pizjuán, Seville, Spain	Albania	5–0	9–0	Euro 1992 qualifying
25	19 December 1990	Sánchez Pizjuán, Seville, Spain	Albania	7–0	9–0	Euro 1992 qualifying
26	19 December 1990	Sánchez Pizjuán, Seville, Spain	Albania	8–0	9–0	Euro 1992 qualifying

== Honours ==
Real Madrid B

- Segunda División: 1983–84

Real Madrid

- La Liga: 1985–86, 1986–87, 1987–88, 1988–89, 1989–90, 1994–95
- Copa del Rey: 1988–89, 1992–93
- Copa de la Liga: 1985
- Supercopa de España: 1988, 1989, 1990, 1993
- UEFA Cup: 1984–85, 1985–86
- Copa Iberoamericana: 1994

Spain

- UEFA European Championship runner-up: 1984

Spain Under-21

- UEFA Under-21 European Championship runner-up: 1984

Individual

- Bravo Award: 1985, 1986
- Ballon d'Or third place: 1986, 1987
- Pichichi Trophy: 1990–91
- FIFA World Cup Silver Boot: 1986
- FIFA World Cup All-Star Team: 1986
- Guerin Sportivo All-Star Team: 1986
- FIFA 100
