= Rafael Gordillo =

Spanish footballer

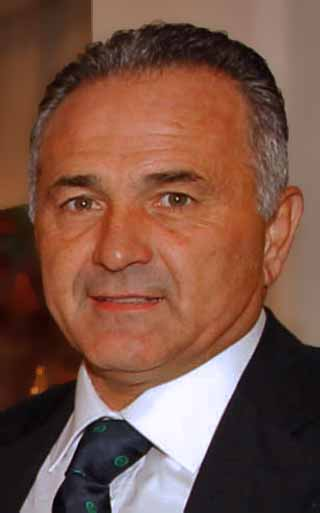
- Gordillo in 2011

Personal information
- Full name: Rafael Gordillo Vázquez
- Date of birth: 24 February 1957 (age 69)
- Place of birth: Almendralejo, Spain
- Height: 1.80 m (5 ft 11 in)
- Position: Wing-back

Youth career
- 1971–1972: San Pablo
- 1972–1975: Betis

Senior career*
Years	Team	Apps	(Gls)
1975–1976	Triana Balompié		
1976–1985	Betis	275	(23)
1985–1992	Real Madrid	182	(20)
1992–1995	Betis	68	(8)
1995–1996	Écija	18	(1)
Total		543	(52)

International career
1977	Spain U21	1	(1)
1979	Spain U23	3	(0)
1979	Spain amateur	4	(0)
1978–1988	Spain	75	(3)
- * Club domestic league appearances and goals

Rafael Gordillo Vázquez (born 24 February 1957) is a Spanish former professional footballer. A tremendously attacking left wing-back, equally at ease as defender and midfielder and with a good effort rate, he had an unmistakable style of playing with his socks down.

He represented mainly Betis and Real Madrid during his career, appearing in 428 La Liga games and scoring 38 goals over 16 seasons. He won ten major titles with the latter club, including five national championships.

Gordillo was a mainstay for the Spain national team in the 80s, appearing in 75 matches and representing the nation in five international tournaments.

== Club career ==
Born in Almendralejo, Province of Badajoz, Extremadura, Gordillo moved to Seville, from where his parents were originally, when he was just a few months old. He grew up in the Polígono de San Pablo neighbourhood, and signed with Real Betis in 1972 at the age of 15. On 30 January 1977 he made his first-team and La Liga debut, against Burgos CF, and helped the Andalusians to win the Copa del Rey in his first year.

After nine professional seasons with Betis – 12 in total, and another with the reserve side – being named the country's footballer of the year at the end of 1979–80 and appearing in 330 official matches, Gordillo moved to Real Madrid for 1985–86, winning the UEFA Cup in his debut campaign and scoring in the final victory over 1. FC Köln.

Gordillo formed a reliable left-wing partnership with José Antonio Camacho during his tenure, playing mainly as a midfielder and being deployed in defence when the latter retired. In 1989's Spanish Cup, he scored the final's only goal against Real Valladolid.

Gordillo returned to Betis in 1992 at the age of 35, helping them return to the top division in his second year (totalling 411 appearances across two spells) and retiring after one season with neighbours Écija Balompié, also in the Segunda División. With the latter, he later worked as director of football.

In the following decade, Gordillo returned to Betis also in directorial capacities. On 13 December 2010, he was elected the club's president.

== International career ==
Gordillo earned 75 caps and scored three goals for Spain over one decade. His debut came on 29 March 1978, in a friendly 3–0 win over Norway in Gijón.

Gordillo went on to represent the country in two FIFA World Cups (1982 and 1986) and three UEFA European Championships (1980, 1984 and 1988, appearing in all the matches but one in the second competition for an eventual runner-up finish).

=== International goals ===
#	Date	Venue	Opponent	Score	Result	Competition
1.	15 May 1983	Ta' Qali National Stadium, Attard, Malta	Malta	2–3	2–3	Euro 1984 qualifying
2.	25 September 1985	Benito Villamarín, Seville, Spain	Iceland	2–1	2–1	1986 World Cup qualification
3.	11 June 1988	Niedersachsenstadion, Hanover, Germany	Denmark	1–3	2–3	UEFA Euro 1988

== Post-retirement ==
Gordillo re-joined Betis for a third time, appearing for the club in the indoor soccer national league. He also worked briefly for laSexta as a sports commentator, at the 2006 World Cup.

== Honours ==
Betis

- Copa del Rey: 1976–77

Real Madrid

- La Liga: 1985–86, 1986–87, 1987–88, 1988–89, 1989–90
- Copa del Rey: 1988–89
- Supercopa de España: 1988, 1989, 1990
- UEFA Cup: 1985–86

Spain

- UEFA European Championship runner-up: 1984

Individual

- Don Balón Award: 1979–80
- La Liga Team of The Year: 1979–80, 1980–81, 1981–82, 1983–84

== See also ==
- List of La Liga players (400+ appearances)
- List of Real Betis players (+100 appearances)
- List of Real Madrid CF players
