= 1988 Supercopa de España =

Real Madrid	Barcelona
3	2
- on aggregate

First leg
Real Madrid	Barcelona
2	0
- Date: 21 September 1988
- Venue: Santiago Bernabéu, Madrid
- Referee: Ildefonso Urizar Azpitarte

Second leg
Barcelona	Real Madrid
2	1
- Date: 29 September 1988
- Venue: Camp Nou, Barcelona
- Referee: José Donato Pes Pérez

The 1988 Supercopa de España was two-leg Spanish football matches played on 21 September and 29 September 1988. It contested by Barcelona, who were Spanish Cup winners in 1987–88, and Real Madrid, who won the 1987–88 Spanish League. Real Madrid won 3–2 on aggregate.

== Match details ==
=== First leg ===
21 September 1988
21:30 CET

Real Madrid	2–0	Barcelona
Míchel 51'; Hugo Sánchez 78'

Santiago Bernabéu, Madrid
Attendance: 70,000
Referee: Urizar Azpitarte

Real Madrid	Barcelona

Real Madrid:
GK	1	(Spain) Francisco Buyo
DF	2	(Spain) Jesús Solana
DF	4	(Spain) Miguel Tendillo
DF	10	(Spain) Ricardo Gallego (c)
DF	3	(Spain) Esteban
MF	6	(Spain) Míchel
MF	8	(West Germany) Bernd Schuster	(yellow card) 77'
MF	5	(Spain) Manuel Sanchís
MF	11	(Spain) Martín Vázquez		(substituted off) 65'
FW	7	(Spain) Emilio Butragueño		(substituted off) 77'
FW	9	(Mexico) Hugo Sánchez	(yellow card) 33'
Substitutes:
GK	13	(Spain) Agustín
DF	12	(Spain) José Antonio Camacho
MF	14	(Spain) Rafael Gordillo		(substituted in) 65'
MF	15	(Spain) Juan José Maqueda
FW	16	(Spain) Francisco Llorente		(substituted in) 77'
Manager:
(Netherlands) Leo Beenhakker

FC Barcelona:
GK	1	(Spain) Andoni Zubizarreta
DF	2	(Spain) Luis López Rekarte	(yellow card) 8'
DF	3	(Spain) José Ramón Alexanko (c)
DF	5	(Spain) Julio Alberto		(substituted off) 46'
MF	8	(Spain) Roberto
MF	4	(Spain) Luis Milla
MF	6	(Spain) José Mari Bakero
MF	10	(Spain) Miquel Soler
FW	7	(Spain) Francisco José Carrasco		(substituted off) 69'
FW	9	(Spain) Julio Salinas
FW	11	(Spain) Txiki Begiristain
Substitutes:
GK	13	(Spain) Juan Carlos Unzué
DF	12	(Spain) Ricardo Serna
DF	14	(Spain) Urbano		(substituted in) 46'
MF	15	(Spain) Guillermo Amor
MF	16	(Spain) Eusebio		(substituted in) 69'
Manager:
(Netherlands) Johan Cruyff

=== Second leg ===
29 September 1988
21:15 CET

Barcelona	2–1	Real Madrid
Bakero 37', 78'		Butragueño 15'

Camp Nou, Barcelona
Attendance: 55,000
Referee: José Donato Pes Pérez

Barcelona	Real Madrid

FC Barcelona:
GK	1	(Spain) Andoni Zubizarreta (c)
DF	5	(Spain) Urbano
DF	3	(Spain) Ricardo Serna
DF	2	(Spain) Luis López Rekarte
MF	8	(Spain) Eusebio Sacristán
MF	4	(Spain) Roberto
MF	6	(Spain) José Mari Bakero
MF	10	(Spain) Miquel Soler	(substituted off) 46'
FW	7	(Spain) Francisco José Carrasco	(substituted off) 83'
FW	9	(Spain) Julio Salinas
FW	11	(Spain) Txiki Begiristain
Substitutes:
GK	13	(Spain) Juan Carlos Unzué
DF	12	(Spain) Cristóbal
DF	14	(Spain) Salva
MF	16	(Spain) Luis Milla	(substituted in) 83'
FW	15	(England) Gary Lineker	(substituted in) 46'
Manager:
(Netherlands) Johan Cruyff

Real Madrid:
Gk	1	(Spain) Francisco Buyo
DF	2	(Spain) Jesús Solana
DF	4	(Spain) Miguel Tendillo
DF	5	(Spain) Manolo Sanchís
DF	3	(Spain) Esteban
MF	6	(Spain) Míchel	(yellow card) 6'
MF	8	(West Germany) Bernd Schuster
MF	10	(Spain) Ricardo Gallego (c)
MF	11	(Spain) Rafael Martín Vázquez	(yellow card) 45'
FW	7	(Spain) Emilio Butragueño		(substituted off) 83'
FW	9	(Mexico) Hugo Sánchez
Substitutes:
GK	13	(Spain) Agustín
MF	12	(Spain) Juan José Maqueda
MF	14	(Spain) Rafael Gordillo		(substituted in) 83'
FW	15	(Spain) Sebastián Losada
FW	16	(Spain) Francisco Llorente
Manager:
(Netherlands) Leo Beenhakker

Supercopa de España
1988 Winners
Real Madrid
First Title

== See also ==
- El Clásico
- 1988–89 La Liga
- 1988–89 Copa del Rey
- 1988–89 FC Barcelona season
- 1988–89 Real Madrid CF season
