= Agustín (footballer) =

Spanish footballer (born 1959)

Personal information
- Full name: Agustín Rodríguez Santiago
- Date of birth: 10 September 1959 (age 67)
- Place of birth: Marín, Spain
- Height: 1.91 m (6 ft 3 in)
- Position: Goalkeeper

Youth career
- 1975–1978: Real Madrid

Senior career*
Years	Team	Apps	(Gls)
1978–1980	Castilla	49	(0)
1980–1990	Real Madrid	76	(0)
1990–1994	Tenerife	55	(0)
Total		180	(0)

International career
1978	Spain U18	6	(0)
1979	Spain U19	3	(0)
1979–1980	Spain U20	5	(0)
1978–1982	Spain U21	11	(0)
1980–1982	Spain U23	2	(0)
1979–1980	Spain amateur	3	(0)
1981	Spain B	1	(0)
- * Club domestic league appearances and goals

Agustín Rodríguez Santiago (born 10 September 1959), known simply as Agustín, is a Spanish former professional footballer who played as a goalkeeper.

== Club career ==
Agustín was born in Marín, Pontevedra, Galicia. Even though he had already trained with the first team, the Real Madrid youth graduate was definitely promoted to the squad for the 1980–81 season. On 4 April 1981, he benefitted from injury to starter Mariano García Remón to make his La Liga debut, playing 71 minutes in the 3–1 away win over UD Salamanca.

Agustín conquered the Ricardo Zamora Trophy for 1982–83 (29 matches, 25 goals), but was almost always only a backup, consecutively to Miguel Ángel, José Manuel Ochotorena and Francisco Buyo. In the final stretch of 1985–86, an injury to the second propelled him to starting duties again, and he appeared in both matches of that campaign's UEFA Cup final against 1. FC Köln (5–3 aggregate victory).

In his last four seasons, Agustín partnered Fernando Redondo at CD Tenerife – his teammate would later play at Real Madrid – helping the insular side to finish fifth in 1992–93 and qualify for the UEFA Cup for the first time ever. In two consecutive years, his main club would lose the league to FC Barcelona in the last round after losses against Tenerife.

Agustín retired in 1994 at the age of 34, and had a brief goalkeeping coach spell (along with other undefined roles) with his last team.

== International career ==
Agustín played Olympic football for Spain in the 1980 Summer Olympics, being a reserve in all matches. He previously helped the nation to reach the quarter-finals at the 1979 FIFA World Youth Championship.

== Honours ==
Castilla

- Copa del Rey runner-up: 1979–80

Real Madrid

- La Liga: 1985–86, 1987–88, 1988–89, 1989–90
- Copa del Rey: 1981–82, 1988–89
- Supercopa de España: 1988, 1989
- Copa de la Liga: 1985
- UEFA Cup: 1985–86
- European Cup runner-up: 1980–81

Individual

- Ricardo Zamora Trophy: 1982–83
