= Manolo Sanchís =

Spanish footballer

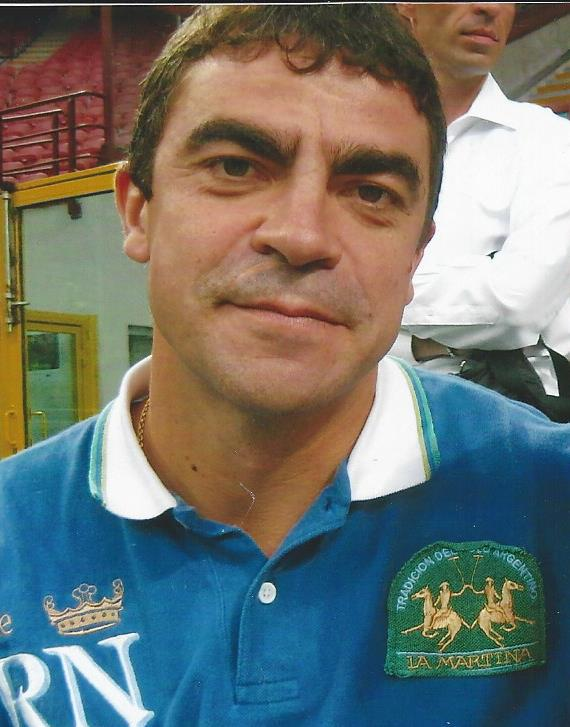
- Sanchís in 2009

Personal information
- Full name: Manuel Sanchís Hontiyuelo
- Date of birth: 23 May 1965 (age 61)
- Place of birth: Madrid, Spain
- Height: 1.77 m (5 ft 10 in)
- Position: Sweeper

Youth career
- 1979–1983: Real Madrid

Senior career*
Years	Team	Apps	(Gls)
1983–1984	Castilla	10	(2)
1983–2001	Real Madrid	523	(33)
Total		533	(35)

International career
1983	Spain U18	6	(1)
1983–1986	Spain U21	16	(0)
1986–1987	Spain U23	2	(0)
1986–1992	Spain	48	(1)
Medal record
Men's football
Representing Spain
UEFA European Under-21 Championship
Winner	1986
- * Club domestic league appearances and goals

Manuel Sanchís Hontiyuelo (Spanish pronunciation: [maˈnolo sanˈtʃis]; born 23 May 1965) is a Spanish former professional footballer who played as a sweeper.

A part of the famous La Quinta del Buitre which stemmed from the Real Madrid youth academy, he was the only one of its five members to spend his entire career with the club. His father Manuel Sanchís also played for Real Madrid, and both were Spanish internationals.

Sanchís appeared in more than 700 competitive matches for his only club, and represented the national team in one World Cup and one European Championship.

== Club career ==
A product of Real Madrid's prolific youth system, Madrid-born Sanchís made his debut with the first team on 4 December 1983, scoring the only goal at Real Murcia CF and finishing his debut campaign with a further 17 appearances (and two goals) for the main squad.

Sanchís only appeared in less than 30 matches in two of the following 15 seasons, and was instrumental in the team's several conquests, including six La Liga championships, two UEFA Champions Leagues and two UEFA Cups. In 1999–2000 he featured sparingly, but still helped them to their eighth European Cup, playing 11 minutes in the final against fellow Spanish side Valencia CF in a 3–0 win.

Sanchís retired in 2001 at the age of 36, having played 710 official games for his only club – 523 of those in the league – while also captaining it for 13 years.

== International career ==
After excelling with the Spanish under-21s, with which he won the 1986 UEFA European Championship, Sanchís made his senior debut on 12 November of that year in a UEFA Euro 1988 qualifier against Romania (1–0 win). He went on to earn 48 full caps, appearing at both Euro 1988 and the 1990 FIFA World Cup.

Sanchís scored his only international goal on 14 October 1987, Spain's second in a 2–0 home victory over Austria also in a Euro 1988 qualifying match. His last game, aged 27, was a 2–0 friendly defeat of the United States on 11 March 1992.

== Style of play ==
As a central defender, Sanchís stood out for his defensive composure, placement and agility. He set a new standard within his club due to both his sporting and human skills. An aggressive yet fair player, he was also noted for his leadership, tactical intelligence, reading of the game and positional sense in addition to his passing, and usually played as a sweeper.

== Career statistics ==
=== Club ===
Appearances and goals by club, season and competition
Club	Season	League			Copa del Rey		Copa de la Liga		Europe (Note: Appearances UEFA Champions League, UEFA Cup, and UEFA Cup Winners' Cup)		Other		Total	
Club	Season	Division	Apps	Goals	Apps	Goals	Apps	Goals	Apps	Goals	Apps	Goals	Apps	Goals
Castilla	1983–84	Segunda División	10	2	0	0	–		–		–		10	2
Real Madrid	1983–84	La Liga	18	3	0	0	2	0	–		–		20	3
Real Madrid	1984–85	La Liga	30	4	1	0	6	0	10	1	–		47	1
Real Madrid	1985–86	La Liga	28	1	6	2	–		7	0	–		41	3
Real Madrid	1986–87	La Liga	36	2	6	0	–		7	1	–		49	3
Real Madrid	1987–88	La Liga	33	9	8	0	–		8	1	–		49	10
Real Madrid	1988–89	La Liga	33	3	9	0	–		7	0	2 (Note: Appearances in Supercopa de España)	0	51	3
Real Madrid	1989–90	La Liga	34	3	7	0	–		4	0	–		45	3
Real Madrid	1990–91	La Liga	31	2	2	0	–		1	0	2	0	36	2
Real Madrid	1991–92	La Liga	37	1	6	1	–		9	1	–		52	3
Real Madrid	1992–93	La Liga	37	1	6	0	–		6	0	–		49	1
Real Madrid	1993–94	La Liga	32	1	4	0	–		6	0	2	0	44	1
Real Madrid	1994–95	La Liga	37	1	2	0	–		3	0	–		42	1
Real Madrid	1995–96	La Liga	32	1	2	0	–		6	0	1	0	41	1
Real Madrid	1996–97	La Liga	22	0	0	0	–		–		–		22	0
Real Madrid	1997–98	La Liga	31	1	1	0	–		10	0	2	0	44	1
Real Madrid	1998–99	La Liga	33	0	4	0	–		7	0	1 (Note: Appearances in UEFA Super Cup) + 1 (Note: Appearances in Intercontinental Cup)	0	46	0
Real Madrid	1999–00	La Liga	14	0	2	0	–		5	0	2	0	23	0
Real Madrid	2000–01	La Liga	5	0	1	0	–		3	0	–		9	0
Real Madrid	Total		523	33	67	3	8	0	99	4	13	0	710	40
Career total			533	35	67	3	8	0	99	4	13	0	720	42

=== International ===
Appearances and goals by national team and year
National team	Year	Apps	Goals
Spain	1986	2	0
Spain	1987	6	1
Spain	1988	12	0
Spain	1989	7	0
Spain	1990	11	0
Spain	1991	7	0
Spain	1992	3	0
Total		48	1

== Honours ==
Real Madrid Castilla

- Segunda División: 1983–84

Real Madrid

- La Liga: 1985–86, 1986–87, 1987–88, 1988–89, 1989–90, 1994–95, 1996–97, 2000–01
- Copa del Rey: 1988–89, 1992–93
- Copa de la Liga: 1985
- Supercopa de España: 1988, 1989, 1990, 1993, 1997
- UEFA Champions League: 1997–98, 1999–2000
- UEFA Cup: 1984–85, 1985–86
- Intercontinental Cup: 1998

Spain

- UEFA European Under-21 Championship: 1986; runner-up: 1984

Individual

- Spanish Footballer of the Year (El País): 1989–90

== See also ==
- List of La Liga players (400+ appearances)
- List of one-club men in association football
- List of Real Madrid CF records and statistics
