= Martín Vázquez =

Martín Vázquez may refer to:

- Rafael Martín Vázquez, Spanish football midfielder
- Martín Vázquez (referee), Uruguayan football referee
