= Esteban Gutiérrez (footballer) =

Spanish association football player

Esteban
Personal information
- Full name: Esteban Gutiérrez Fernández
- Date of birth: 20 October 1960 (age 66)
- Place of birth: Oviñana, Spain
- Position: Defender

Senior career*
| Years | Team | Apps | (Gls) |
| 1978–1988 | Sporting Gijón | 168 | (8) |
| 1978–1981 | → Ensidesa (loan) | 80 | (6) |
| 1981–1982 | → Melilla (loan) | | |
| 1988–1990 | Real Madrid | 36 | (0) |
| 1990–1994 | Zaragoza | 106 | (0) |
| 1994–1995 | Racing Ferrol | 9 | (0) |
| 1996–1998 | Caudal | 28+ | (0+) |
| Total | | 427+ | (14+) |

International career
| 1983–1984 | Spain U21 | 3 | (0) |
| 1983–1988 | Spain U23 | 3 | (0) |
- * Club domestic league appearances and goals

Esteban Gutiérrez Fernández (born 20 October 1960), known as simply Esteban, is a Spanish former footballer who played as a defender.

He played 310 La Liga games for Sporting Gijón, Real Madrid and Real Zaragoza. He won the league twice with Real Madrid, and the Copa del Rey once each for them and for Zaragoza.

== Club career ==
Esteban was born in Oviñana in Cudillero, Asturias, and began his career with Ensidesa in the Segunda División B. He made his La Liga debut for Sporting de Gijón on 4 September 1982 in a 1–1 draw away to Málaga, playing the last two minutes as a substitute for Manuel Jiménez under manager Vujadin Boškov.

On 19 October 1982, Esteban scored his first goal for Sporting at the end of a 3–2 loss to Langreo in the second round of the Copa del Rey. He did not score for the club in the league until 1985–86 when he netted six times, four from the penalty spot; the first was on 8 September 1985 to equalise in a 1–1 draw at Real Betis.

In August 1988, Esteban joined Real Madrid, choosing them over Atlético Madrid when his Sporting contract expired. He made his debut on 4 September in the first game of the season, playing the final 18 minutes as a substitute for José Antonio Camacho in a 2–2 home draw with Osasuna. Later in the month he played every minute of a 3–2 aggregate win over Barcelona in the Supercopa de España. He totalled 42 games in his first season at the Santiago Bernabéu Stadium, scoring once to open a 5–5 draw away to his previous club in the last 16 of the cup on 15 February, and was sent off in a 3–3 draw away to Atlético in the Madrid derby on 20 May. The Merengues finished the season by winning the double, though Esteban was an unused substitute in the 1–0 cup final win over Real Valladolid.

On 27 September 1989, Esteban scored his only continental goal in a 6–0 home win over Spora Luxembourg in the second leg of the European Cup first round. He won the league again, playing less frequently, and moved at the end of the season to Real Zaragoza. His transfer fee of 20 million Spanish pesetas was deducted from the 315 million deal that took Francisco Villarroya in the other direction.

Esteban played a second Copa del Rey final on 26 June 1993, a 2–0 loss to his previous club. A year later, Zaragoza lifted the trophy, though his only input was a third-round game in August in which he was withdrawn with injury.

== International career ==
Esteban played for the Spain under-23 team in Olympic football qualifiers. He played two such games for 1984 and one in 1988.
