= Rafael Martín Vázquez =

Spanish footballer

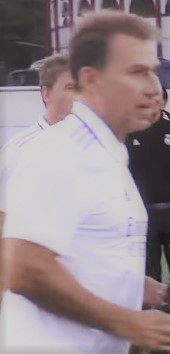
- Martín Vázquez in 2022

Personal information
- Date of birth: 25 September 1965 (age 61)
- Place of birth: Madrid, Spain
- Height: 1.80 m (5 ft 11 in)
- Position: Attacking midfielder

Youth career
- Escolapios
- 1980–1983: Real Madrid

Senior career*
Years	Team	Apps	(Gls)
1983	Castilla	14	(3)
1983–1990	Real Madrid	179	(35)
1990–1992	Torino	52	(2)
1992	Marseille	7	(1)
1992–1995	Real Madrid	73	(7)
1995–1997	Deportivo La Coruña	17	(2)
1997–1998	Celaya	10	(0)
1998	Karlsruher SC	5	(0)
Total		357	(50)

International career
1983–1984	Spain U18	10	(2)
1984–1988	Spain U21	15	(1)
1987	Spain U23	2	(1)
1984	Spain amateur	1	(0)
1987–1992	Spain	38	(1)

Managerial career
- 2018: Extremadura
- * Club domestic league appearances and goals

Rafael Martín Vázquez (born 25 September 1965) is a Spanish former professional footballer who played mostly as an attacking midfielder.

He represented most notably Real Madrid, having two different spells and amassing La Liga totals of 252 games and 42 goals for the club. He also played abroad in Italy, France, Mexico and Germany.

Martín Vázquez appeared for Spain at the 1990 World Cup and Euro 1988, winning nearly 40 caps.

== Club career ==
Born in Madrid, Martín Vázquez joined the youth academy of Real Madrid in 1980 at the age of 15 and made his debut for the first team three years later, going on to achieve fame as part of the La Quinta del Buitre which still included Míchel, Emilio Butragueño, Miguel Pardeza and Manolo Sanchís. In 1989–90, as Real achieved a club and La Liga record of 107 goals, he scored a career-best 14, second only in the squad to Hugo Sánchez's 38.

After the arrival of Romanian Gheorghe Hagi, Martín Vázquez decided to accept the offer of Torino FC, but failed to settle in Italy during his two-season spell, although he did help the side reach the 1992 UEFA Cup final. He then moved to Olympique de Marseille but only lasted two months in France, after which a return to Real Madrid was arranged; in his two stints with the latter he won six leagues, two UEFA Cups and two Copa del Rey.

As injuries hit him, Martín Vázquez eventually retired from football at the end of 1998, after unassuming spells with Deportivo de La Coruña, Atlético Celaya – where he teamed up with Butragueño – and Karlsruher SC (German 2. Bundesliga). Afterwards, he worked with Real Madrid as a youth coach while also keeping fit with the club's veterans.

== International career ==
Martín Vázquez played 38 times for Spain, including at UEFA Euro 1988 and the 1990 FIFA World Cup. His debut came on 23 September 1987, in a friendly against Luxembourg.

=== International goals ===
#	Date	Venue	Opponent	Score	Result	Competition
1	4 September 1991	Carlos Tartiere, Oviedo, Spain	Uruguay	1–0	2–1	Friendly

== Honours ==
Real Madrid

- La Liga: 1985–86, 1986–87, 1987–88, 1988–89, 1989–90, 1994–95
- Copa del Rey: 1988–89, 1992–93
- Copa de la Liga: 1985
- Supercopa de España: 1988, 1989, 1993
- UEFA Cup: 1984–85, 1985–86
- Copa Iberoamericana: 1994

Torino

- UEFA Cup runner-up: 1991–92

Marseille

- UEFA Champions League: 1992–93

Spain U21

- UEFA European Under-21 Championship: 1986

Individual

- World XI: 1989, 1990, 1991
- Don Balón Award: 1990
