= Julio García (footballer, born 1965) =

Spanish footballer

Personal information
- Full name: Julio García Fernández
- Date of birth: 2 May 1965 (age 61)
- Place of birth: Seville, Spain
- Height: 1.81 m (5 ft 11 in)
- Position: Centre back

Youth career
- 1976–1983: Betis

Senior career*
Years	Team	Apps	(Gls)
1982–1986	Betis B		
1984–1993	Betis	155	(2)
1986–1987	→ Recreativo (loan)	34	(0)
1993–1994	Murcia	37	(0)
1994–1998	Almería	128	(0)
- * Club domestic league appearances and goals

Julio García Fernández (born 2 May 1965), sometimes known as just Julio, is a Spanish retired footballer who played as a central defender.

== Club career ==
Born in Seville, Andalusia, Julio graduated with Real Betis' youth setup. He made his senior debuts with the reserves in 1982, in Tercera División.

Julio made his first team – and La Liga – debut on 1 April 1984, coming on as a late substitute in a 1–0 away win against RCD Mallorca. After being subsequently demoted back to the B-team, he was loaned to Segunda División's Recreativo de Huelva in the 1986 summer.

After returning from the loan, Julio was definitely promoted to the main squad, and was an ever-present figure in 1987–88. He scored his first professional goal on 6 January 1991, netting his side's only in a 1–1 draw at CD Tenerife.

In the 1993 summer, after being deemed surplus to requirements by manager Sergije Krešić, Julio left the Verdiblancos and moved to Real Murcia in the second level. After one year as a starter, he joined UD Almería, representing the side in the same division but also in Segunda División B.

Julio eventually hung up his boots in 1998, aged 32.

== See also ==
- List of Real Betis players
- List of La Liga players
