= Paco Buyo =

Spanish footballer (born 1958)

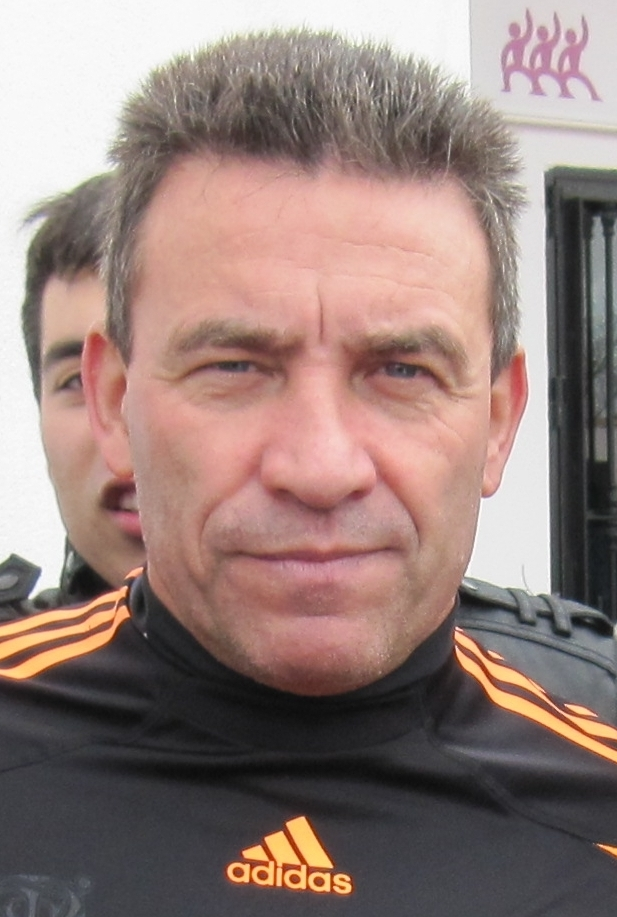

Personal information
- Full name: Francisco Buyo Sánchez
- Date of birth: 13 January 1958 (age 68)
- Place of birth: Betanzos, Spain
- Height: 1.79 m (5 ft 10 in)
- Position: Goalkeeper

Youth career
- 1972–1973: Ural
- 1973–1975: Betanzos

Senior career*
Years	Team	Apps	(Gls)
1975–1976	Mallorca	16	(0)
1976–1980	Deportivo La Coruña	122	(0)
1978–1979	→ Huesca (loan)	22	(0)
1980–1986	Sevilla	199	(0)
1986–1997	Real Madrid	343	(0)
Total		702	(0)

International career
1977	Spain U20	3	(0)
1977–1978	Spain U21	3	(0)
1979–1987	Spain U23	4	(0)
1979–1983	Spain amateur	11	(0)
1980	Spain B	1	(0)
1983–1992	Spain	7	(0)

Managerial career
- 1999–2000: Real Madrid C
- 2000–2001: Real Madrid B
- 2008: Jaén B
- * Club domestic league appearances and goals

Francisco "Paco" Buyo Sánchez (born 13 January 1958) is a Spanish former professional footballer who played as a goalkeeper.

Best known for his Sevilla and Real Madrid spells, he appeared in 542 La Liga matches, third all-time highest at the time of his retirement, winning 12 major titles with the latter club.

Buyo was a backup on the Spain national team for about one decade, representing the nation in two European Championships.

== Club career ==
Buyo was born in Betanzos, Province of A Coruña. At the age of 14, he began playing football for local Ural, for which he appeared as both a goalkeeper and right winger during his one-year spell, achieving the feat of being both unbeaten between the goalposts and also the team's top scorer.

Buyo's first senior club was Mallorca, in the Tercera División. After one season, he joined Deportivo de La Coruña, where he would stay until 1980, with a loan to Huesca – while he performed military service in Jaca – in between. He made his debut in La Liga in the 1980–81 season with Sevilla, being the starting goalkeeper from the beginning; he appeared in 248 competitive matches during his spell, also earning his first callup to the Spain national team.

Buyo's performances at Sevilla made Real Madrid require his services, signing him in 1986 as a replacement for veteran Miguel Ángel. In his first season, he played all 44 league games (the campaign featured a second stage), the first being a 3–1 away win over Real Murcia, being instrumental to the Merengues' national title. He would remain in the Spanish capital until his retirement in 1997, aged 39.

The local success Buyo met with Madrid (six leagues and two Copa del Rey) could not be translated into international accolades, as they kept being eliminated in European Cup competition. However, in his first season, he did have a memorable performance against Michel Platini's Juventus in the round of 16 of the 1986–87 edition: after the Spaniards won 1–0 in the first leg and the Italians did the same in the second meeting, the winner was decided in a penalty shootout, won by the former after he saved two of the opposition's shots. He earned his first Ricardo Zamora Trophy in the 1987–88 campaign after conceding only 23 goals in 35 league fixtures, and his second came in 1991–92 where he played as many matches, with 27 goals against.

Madrid would win two more league titles with Buyo in goal, the first of which came in 1994–95, during which he also had a streak of 709 minutes without conceding a goal in league play, between 3 December 1994 and 12 February 1995, the fifth-longest streak ever in the Spanish league; in total, he kept 17 clean sheets throughout the course of the season. The club won another league in his final year, but he did not feature at all as he was only third choice behind Bodo Illgner and Santiago Cañizares.

Buyo retired with 542 top-division games played, the third-most behind another goalkeeper, Andoni Zubizarreta, and Eusebio Sacristán.

== International career ==
During Buyo's time at Deportivo, he was selected to the Spain under-21 team. He also represented the nation at the 1980 Summer Olympics, being eliminated in the first round.

At full international level, Buyo was capped seven times and was part of the squad that finished runner-up at the UEFA Euro 1984. His debut came on 21 December 1983 in the historic 12–1 trouncing of Malta for the qualifying stage, in a match played in Seville.

== Post-retirement ==
After retiring, Buyo had a short coaching spell with Real Madrid cadetes and third senior team, In 2000–01, he was in charge of Castilla in the Segunda División B. He only returned to the benches in 2008, with Real Jaén's reserves.

Additionally, Buyo worked as a sports analyst in Al-Jazeera, contributing to its La Liga and UEFA Euro 2008 coverage.

== Honours ==
Real Madrid

- La Liga: 1986–87, 1987–88, 1988–89, 1989–90, 1994–95, 1996–97
- Copa del Rey: 1988–89, 1992–93
- Supercopa de España: 1988, 1989, 1990, 1993
- Copa Iberoamericana: 1994

Spain

- UEFA European Championship runner-up: 1984

Individual

- Ricardo Zamora Trophy: 1987–88, 1991–92

== See also ==
- List of La Liga players (400+ appearances)
