= Albert Aguilà =

Spanish footballer and manager

Personal information
- Full name: Albert Aguilà i Lalana
- Date of birth: 9 August 1970 (age 56)
- Place of birth: Almacelles, Spain
- Height: 1.79 m (5 ft 10 in)
- Position: Forward

Youth career
- 1985–1989: Real Madrid

Senior career*
Years	Team	Apps	(Gls)
1988–1990	Castilla	22	(1)
1988–1991	Real Madrid	2	(0)
1990–1991	→ CD Logroñés (loan)	20	(4)
1991–1993	Osasuna	56	(10)
1993–1996	Lleida	26	(3)
1996–1997	Barbastro	10	(4)
1997	Gavà	13	(1)
1997–1999	Calahorra	20+	(0+)
2000–2001	Recreación		

International career
1988–1989	Spain U19	5	(1)
1989–1990	Spain U20	3	(0)
1990–1991	Spain U21	6	(2)
1993	Catalonia	1	(0)

Managerial career
- Comillas (youth)
- 2017–2018: Osasuna (youth)
- 2019–2021: SD Logroñés
- 2021–2022: UD Logroñés B
- 2022: UD Logroñés
- * Club domestic league appearances and goals

Albert Aguilà i Lalana (born 9 August 1970) is a Spanish football manager and former player who played mainly as a forward.

== Playing career ==
Born in Almacelles, Lleida, Catalonia, Aguilà joined Real Madrid's La Fábrica at the age of 14. On 13 January 1988, before even having appeared with the reserves, he made his first team debut by coming on as a late substitute for Paco Llorente in a 3–2 Copa del Rey away loss against CE Sabadell FC.

Aguilà made his La Liga debut on 18 June 1989, replacing Bernd Schuster in a 3–1 away win over Elche CF. In June 1990, after establishing himself as a regular for Castilla, he was loaned to CD Logroñés in the top tier.

In 1991, Aguilà signed a permanent deal with CA Osasuna, also in the first division. After scoring a career-best seven goals during the 1992–93 campaign, he moved to UE Lleida in the same category, suffering relegation in his first season and subsequently struggling with injuries.

In January 1997, after more than a year without playing, Aguilà signed for CF Gavà in Segunda División B. He moved to Tercera División side UD Barbastro in the summer, before returning to the third tier with CD Calahorra in 1998.

In 2000, Aguilà returned to the city of Logroño after agreeing to a contract with CD Recreación de La Rioja. He retired in the following year at the age of just 31, after helping the side in their promotion to the fourth tier.

== Coaching career ==
After retiring, Aguilà worked as a youth coach at Comillas CF and former side Osasuna before being appointed manager of SD Logroñés in the fourth tier on 13 February 2019. He departed the side in May 2021, after achieving two consecutive promotions (to Segunda División B in 2020 and to the newly created third tier named Primera División RFEF in 2021).

On 27 December 2021, Aguilà took over UD Logroñés' reserves in Segunda División RFEF. The following 3 April, he replaced Mere at the helm of the main squad.

== Managerial statistics ==
As of 19 November 2022

Managerial record by team and tenure
Team	Nat	From	To	Record								Ref
Team	Nat	From	To	G	W	D	L	GF	GA	GD	Win %	Ref
SD Logroñés	(Spain)	13 February 2019	11 May 2021	74	45	18	11	142	56	+86	60.81	
UD Logroñés B	(Spain)	27 December 2021	3 April 2022	12	6	5	1	15	7	+8	50.00	
UD Logroñés	(Spain)	3 April 2022	22 November 2022	22	9	3	10	29	27	+2	40.91	
Total				108	60	26	22	186	90	+96	55.56	—

== Honours ==
Real Madrid

- La Liga: 1988–89, 1989–90
