= 1985–86 La Liga =

55th season of La Liga

La Liga
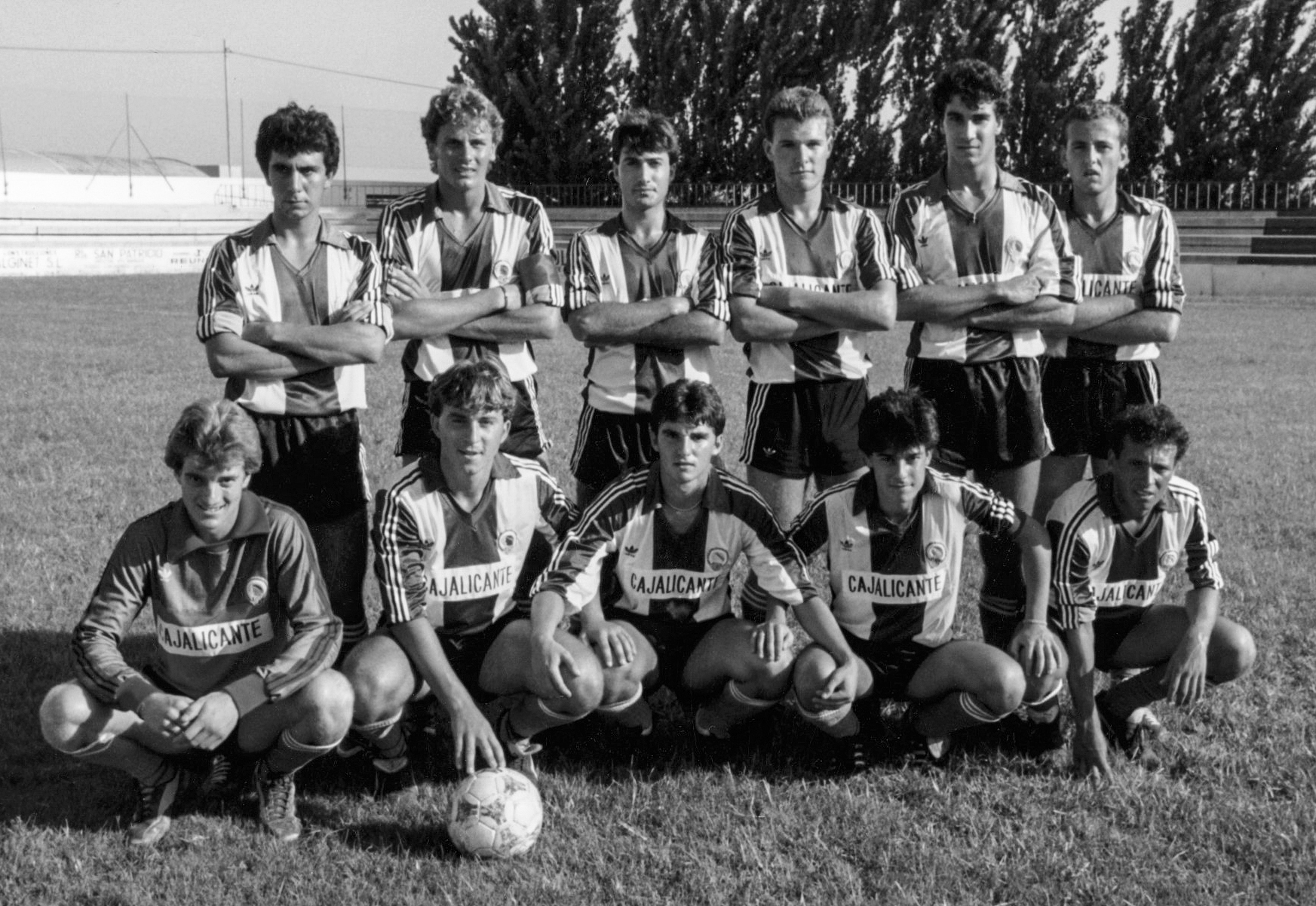
- Hércules line-up in a preseason match. The Valencian team would be relegated that year.
- Dates: 31 August 1985 – 20 April 1986
- Champions: Real Madrid; 21st title
- Relegated: Valencia; Hércules; Celta Vigo
- European Cup: Real Madrid
- Cup Winners' Cup: Zaragoza
- UEFA Cup: Barcelona; Athletic Bilbao; Atlético Madrid
- Matches: 306
- Goals: 798 (2.61 per match)
- Top goalscorer: Hugo Sánchez (22 goals)

The 1985–86 La Liga season was the 55th since its establishment. It began on 31 August 1985, and concluded on 20 April 1986.

Barcelona lost their defence of the title to Real Madrid, who won the title by an 11-point margin.

This season marked Valencia's only relegation from La Liga to date.

== Teams and locations ==
Location of teams in La Liga 1985–86
Canary Islands

Team	Home city	Stadium
Athletic Bilbao	Bilbao	San Mamés
Atlético Madrid	Madrid	Vicente Calderón
Barcelona	Barcelona	Nou Camp
Cádiz	Cádiz	Ramón de Carranza
Celta	Vigo	Balaídos
Español	Barcelona	Sarrià
Hércules	Alicante	José Rico Pérez
Las Palmas	Las Palmas	Insular
Osasuna	Pamplona	El Sadar
Racing Santander	Santander	El Sardinero
Real Betis	Seville	Benito Villamarín
Real Madrid	Madrid	Santiago Bernabéu
Real Sociedad	San Sebastián	Atocha
Sevilla	Seville	Ramón Sánchez Pizjuán
Sporting Gijón	Gijón	El Molinón
Valencia	Valencia	Luis Casanova
Valladolid	Valladolid	José Zorrilla
Zaragoza	Zaragoza	La Romareda

== League table ==
Pos	Team	Pld	W	D	L	GF	GA	GD	Pts	Qualification or relegation
1	Real Madrid (C)	34	26	4	4	83	33	+50	56	Qualification for the European Cup first round
2	Barcelona	34	18	9	7	61	36	+25	45	Qualification for the UEFA Cup first round
3	Athletic Bilbao	34	17	9	8	44	31	+13	43	Qualification for the UEFA Cup first round
4	Zaragoza	34	15	12	7	51	34	+17	42	Qualification for the Cup Winners' Cup first round (Note: Zaragoza qualified for the European Cup Winners' Cup as champions of the Copa del Rey.)
5	Atlético Madrid	34	17	8	9	53	38	+15	42	Qualification for the UEFA Cup first round
6	Sporting Gijón	34	13	15	6	37	27	+10	41	
7	Real Sociedad	34	17	5	12	64	51	+13	39	
8	Real Betis	34	11	13	10	40	40	0	35	
9	Sevilla	34	12	10	12	39	34	+5	34	
10	Valladolid	34	13	6	15	54	48	+6	32	
11	Español	34	11	9	14	43	40	+3	31	
12	Racing Santander	34	10	11	13	33	34	−1	31	
13	Las Palmas	34	9	9	16	37	65	−28	27	
14	Osasuna	34	9	9	16	24	33	−9	27	
15	Cádiz	34	9	8	17	30	58	−28	26	
16	Valencia (R)	34	8	9	17	38	62	−24	25	Relegation to the Segunda División
17	Hércules (R)	34	8	6	20	35	62	−27	22	Relegation to the Segunda División
18	Celta Vigo (R)	34	5	4	25	32	72	−40	14	Relegation to the Segunda División

Source: BDFútbol
Rules for classification: 1) Points; 2) Head-to-head results; 3) Goal difference; 4) Number of goals scored
(C) Champions; (R) Relegated

== Results table ==
Home \ Away	ATH	ATM	BAR	BET	CÁD	CEL	ESP	HÉR	LPA	OSA	RAC	RMA	RSO	SEV	SPG	VAL	VLD	ZAR
Athletic Bilbao		1–1	2–1	2–1	2–0	3–1	1–0	1–0	1–1	2–0	3–0	1–2	2–0	3–1	2–0	2–2	3–3	1–1
Atlético Madrid	3–1		2–1	2–1	2–1	3–1	2–0	1–0	1–0	1–0	2–0	0–1	3–1	3–0	1–1	5–0	1–4	0–2
FC Barcelona	3–1	2–1		1–2	1–0	1–1	0–0	3–1	3–1	2–2	2–0	2–0	2–3	0–0	2–0	3–0	4–0	2–0
Betis	2–0	2–2	1–1		4–1	3–2	1–0	1–0	1–1	1–0	1–1	2–2	1–3	1–0	1–1	0–0	1–1	0–1
Cádiz CF	1–1	2–0	1–3	0–0		1–0	0–0	2–0	1–0	2–0	2–1	1–3	3–0	0–4	0–0	2–3	1–0	1–3
Celta de Vigo	0–1	0–1	0–2	0–1	1–2		2–1	1–2	4–0	2–0	1–2	1–5	1–3	1–2	1–1	1–0	3–2	1–2
RCD Español	1–0	1–2	5–3	2–0	5–0	1–0		4–1	2–0	0–1	2–0	1–2	2–2	4–2	0–0	2–1	2–1	1–2
Hércules CF	0–1	2–2	1–2	2–3	1–1	5–2	1–1		2–0	1–1	1–0	0–3	2–0	2–1	0–1	3–2	1–0	2–2
UD Las Palmas	2–2	1–3	3–0	1–0	2–2	1–1	3–1	2–1		0–0	1–0	4–3	1–2	2–5	1–3	2–0	1–0	2–2
Osasuna	0–1	1–1	0–1	1–0	0–0	2–1	2–0	1–0	0–1		1–1	0–1	1–2	0–0	1–2	2–0	2–1	2–1
Racing de Santander	0–0	2–0	0–0	1–1	3–0	3–0	2–2	4–1	0–0	1–0		1–1	2–0	1–0	0–1	2–2	1–1	2–3
Real Madrid	2–0	2–1	3–1	4–1	3–1	4–0	4–1	4–0	5–1	2–0	1–0		1–0	2–1	2–1	5–0	2–1	1–0
Real Sociedad	1–0	2–3	1–5	2–2	4–0	1–1	1–0	6–0	6–0	1–0	1–1	5–3		1–0	2–1	6–0	2–1	2–0
Sevilla FC	0–0	2–1	0–0	1–0	3–0	2–1	1–1	0–0	4–0	1–0	0–1	2–2	3–1		0–0	0–2	1–0	0–0
Sporting de Gijón	1–0	1–1	1–1	0–0	2–2	2–0	1–1	3–1	1–0	1–2	2–0	0–2	0–0	2–1		1–0	3–0	2–2
Valencia CF	1–2	1–1	1–2	0–2	1–0	3–1	0–0	3–1	1–1	1–1	0–1	0–3	3–1	0–1	1–1		2–1	4–2
Valladolid	0–1	2–1	2–2	4–2	3–0	4–0	1–0	3–1	4–2	1–0	1–0	3–2	4–1	2–0	0–1	3–3		1–1
Zaragoza	0–1	0–0	1–3	1–1	3–0	6–0	1–0	1–0	4–0	1–1	1–0	1–1	3–1	1–1	0–0	2–1	1–0	

Legend: Blue = home team win; Yellow = draw; Red = away team win.

== Pichichi Trophy ==
Rank	Player	Club	Goals
1	(Mexico) Hugo Sánchez	Real Madrid	22
2	(Argentina) Jorge Valdano	Real Madrid	16
3	(Spain) Juan Señor	Zaragoza	15
4	(Argentina) Mario Cabrera	Atlético Madrid	13
4	(Uruguay) Jorge da Silva	Atlético Madrid	13

La Liga 1985–86 winners
Real Madrid
21st title
