= 1988–89 La Liga =

58th season of La Liga

La Liga
- Season: 1988–89
- Dates: 3 September 1988 – 25 June 1989
- Champions: Real Madrid (24th title)
- Relegated: Real Betis; Murcia; Elche
- European Cup: Real Madrid
- UEFA Cup: Valencia; Atlético Madrid; Zaragoza
- Cup Winners' Cup: Barcelona; Valladolid
- Matches: 380
- Goals: 868 (2.28 per match)
- Top goalscorer: Baltazar (35 goals)

The 1988–89 La Liga season was the 58th since its establishment. It began on 3 September 1988, and concluded on 25 June 1989.

Real Madrid finished the season as champions for the fourth year running, while Barcelona recovered under new coach Johan Cruyff to finish second.

== Teams ==
Location of teams in La Liga 1988–89

Team	Home city	Stadium
Athletic Bilbao	Bilbao	San Mamés
Atlético Madrid	Madrid	Vicente Calderón
Barcelona	Barcelona	Nou Camp
Cádiz	Cádiz	Ramón de Carranza
Celta Vigo	Vigo	Balaídos
Elche	Elche	Manuel Martínez Valero
Español	Barcelona	Sarrià
Logroñés	Logroño	Las Gaunas
Málaga	Málaga	La Rosaleda
Murcia	Murcia	La Condomina
Osasuna	Pamplona	El Sadar
Oviedo	Oviedo	Carlos Tartiere
Real Betis	Seville	Benito Villamarín
Real Madrid	Madrid	Santiago Bernabéu
Real Sociedad	San Sebastián	Atocha
Sevilla	Seville	Ramón Sánchez Pizjuán
Sporting Gijón	Gijón	El Molinón
Valencia	Valencia	Luis Casanova
Valladolid	Valladolid	José Zorrilla
Zaragoza	Zaragoza	La Romareda

== League table ==
Pos	Team	Pld	W	D	L	GF	GA	GD	Pts	Qualification or relegation
1	Real Madrid (C)	38	25	12	1	91	37	+54	62	Qualification for the European Cup first round
2	Barcelona	38	23	11	4	80	26	+54	57	Qualification for the Cup Winners' Cup first round (Note: Qualify for Cup Winners' Cup as holders.)
3	Valencia	38	18	13	7	39	26	+13	49	Qualification for the UEFA Cup first round
4	Atlético Madrid	38	19	8	11	69	45	+24	46	Qualification for the UEFA Cup first round
5	Zaragoza	38	15	13	10	48	42	+6	43	Qualification for the UEFA Cup first round
6	Valladolid	38	18	7	13	40	31	+9	43	Qualification for the Cup Winners' Cup first round (Note: Runner-up of Copa del Rey.)
7	Athletic Bilbao	38	15	12	11	45	35	+10	42	
8	Celta Vigo	38	14	11	13	42	48	−6	39	
9	Sevilla	38	13	12	13	38	39	−1	38	
10	Osasuna	38	13	11	14	39	43	−4	37	
11	Real Sociedad	38	11	14	13	38	47	−9	36	
12	Oviedo	38	12	11	15	41	48	−7	35	
13	Sporting Gijón	38	13	9	16	42	42	0	35	
14	Logroñés	38	9	16	13	25	37	−12	34	
15	Cádiz	38	9	15	14	31	41	−10	33	
16	Málaga	38	12	9	17	39	53	−14	33	
17	Español (R)	38	7	16	15	29	44	−15	30	Qualification for the relegation playoffs
18	Real Betis (R)	38	9	11	18	36	55	−19	29	Qualification for the relegation playoffs
19	Murcia (R)	38	9	6	23	27	58	−31	24	Relegation to the Segunda División
20	Elche (R)	38	4	7	27	29	71	−42	15	Relegation to the Segunda División

Source: BDFútbol
(C) Champions; (R) Relegated

== Relegation playoff ==
Team 1	Agg.	Team 2	1st leg	2nd leg
Español	1–2 (a.e.t.)	Mallorca	1–0	0–2
Tenerife	4–1	Real Betis	4–0	0–1

=== First leg ===
28 June 1989	Español	1–0	Mallorca	Barcelona
	Golobart 58'	Report (in Spanish)		Stadium: Sarrià; Attendance: 37,000; Referee: Victoriano Sánchez Arminio (Cantabria)

28 June 1989	Tenerife	4–0	Real Betis	Santa Cruz de Tenerife
	Rommel Fernández 29', 45'; Julio 77' (o.g.); El Ghareff 79'	Report (in Spanish)		Stadium: Heliodoro Rodríguez López; Attendance: 20,000; Referee: José María Enriquez Negreira (Catalonia)

=== Second leg ===
2 July 1989	Mallorca	2–0 (a.e.t.) (2–1 agg.)	Español	Palma
	Nadal 12'; Vidal 93'	Report & Report(in Spanish)		Stadium: Lluís Sitjar; Attendance: 16,500; Referee: Joaquín Urío Velázquez (Basque Country (autonomous community))

2 July 1989	Real Betis	1–0 (1–4 agg.)	Tenerife	Seville
	Chano 80'	Report (in Spanish)		Stadium: Benito Villamarín; Attendance: 47,000; Referee: Joaquín Ramos Marco (Castile and León)

== Results ==
Home \ Away	ATH	ATM	FCB	BET	CÁD	CEL	ELC	ESP	LOG	MCF	MUR	OSA	RMA	ROV	RSO	SFC	RSG	VCF	VLD	ZAR
Athletic Bilbao		1–1	3–2	1–1	1–0	2–0	2–0	1–0	3–0	3–1	3–0	0–0	1–1	1–0	2–3	3–0	1–4	1–2	2–0	1–1
Atlético Madrid	0–1		1–3	6–2	3–0	0–0	3–1	6–1	2–0	3–0	3–0	4–1	3–3	2–2	3–0	2–0	0–0	2–0	3–2	3–1
Barcelona	3–0	3–0		3–0	3–0	3–1	2–0	2–0	2–1	4–0	3–1	1–2	0–0	7–1	4–1	4–0	4–0	1–1	0–0	1–0
Betis	2–0	0–1	0–2		1–1	2–0	3–1	2–2	0–0	1–2	3–0	1–0	0–2	1–0	1–1	1–3	0–1	0–0	0–1	2–1
Cádiz	0–0	2–0	1–1	4–0		1–1	2–1	0–0	0–1	0–1	0–2	1–1	0–2	1–1	1–1	0–0	0–3	1–1	1–1	1–1
Celta de Vigo	1–2	0–3	0–3	0–0	3–2		3–0	0–0	1–0	2–0	0–0	1–0	2–0	1–2	2–2	1–0	2–1	2–0	1–1	1–1
Elche	2–0	1–3	0–3	0–0	2–2	0–1		1–1	1–2	0–2	3–0	0–1	1–3	0–1	1–1	1–2	0–0	0–1	1–0	1–4
Espanyol	1–0	1–0	2–2	0–0	0–2	1–1	1–1		2–0	0–1	3–0	1–1	1–4	1–2	1–1	1–1	2–1	0–1	0–1	2–2
Logroñés	1–1	1–0	0–2	3–1	1–0	1–1	2–1	0–0		1–0	0–0	1–1	0–1	1–1	1–1	0–0	1–0	0–1	1–1	0–2
Málaga	1–1	1–2	2–2	2–2	0–2	2–2	2–1	1–0	1–0		1–3	1–2	2–2	1–1	1–0	1–0	1–0	0–1	0–0	1–3
Murcia	1–1	1–1	2–0	0–2	0–1	1–2	0–1	1–0	0–0	1–0		6–1	0–3	0–0	0–1	1–2	0–3	0–1	2–1	0–3
Osasuna	1–0	2–0	1–1	3–1	0–1	1–0	1–1	0–0	0–0	1–0	1–0		1–1	3–1	1–0	1–3	0–0	0–1	0–2	3–0
Real Madrid	3–3	2–1	3–2	5–1	4–0	4–1	4–2	3–0	1–0	2–1	3–0	2–2		1–0	2–2	3–0	5–1	2–1	3–2	4–0
Oviedo	0–3	5–2	1–2	0–3	1–0	4–0	3–0	0–1	1–1	2–3	2–0	3–2	1–3		1–0	0–0	1–0	0–0	0–1	1–1
Real Sociedad	1–0	1–2	0–1	2–1	0–0	4–2	1–0	0–1	2–2	2–2	0–2	2–1	1–1	0–0		1–0	2–1	0–0	1–0	2–1
Sevilla	0–0	4–1	1–1	1–0	1–1	1–3	4–1	0–0	0–1	1–1	3–0	1–0	1–1	2–1	2–0		1–0	1–0	2–4	0–1
Sporting Gijón	0–1	2–2	0–2	0–0	1–0	1–2	2–0	2–1	3–0	1–2	0–1	2–1	2–2	0–0	4–2	0–0		1–0	2–1	1–2
Valencia	0–0	1–0	1–1	3–0	1–2	1–0	3–2	1–1	0–0	2–1	3–0	3–2	1–1	0–1	1–0	1–0	2–1		1–0	2–2
Valladolid	1–0	0–1	0–0	2–1	1–0	0–1	3–0	1–0	3–1	1–0	2–1	1–0	0–1	1–0	2–0	2–1	0–1	1–1		1–0
Zaragoza	1–0	0–0	0–0	2–1	0–1	2–1	3–1	2–1	1–1	2–1	2–1	0–1	1–4	3–1	0–0	0–0	1–1	0–0	2–0	

Updated to match(es) played on unknown. Source: LFP (in Spanish)
Legend: Blue = home team win; Yellow = draw; Red = away team win.

== Top goalscorers ==
Rank	Player	Club	Goals
1	(Brazil) Baltazar	Atlético Madrid	35
2	(Mexico) Hugo Sánchez	Real Madrid	27
3	(Spain) Julio Salinas	Barcelona	20
4	(Brazil) Amarildo	Celta Vigo	16
5	(Spain) Emilio Butragueño	Real Madrid	15
6	(Spain) Fernando	Valencia	14
7	(Spain) Míchel	Real Madrid	13
7	(Spain) Pedro Uralde	Athletic Bilbao	13
9	(Spain) Txiki Begiristain	Barcelona	12
10	(Spain) Roberto	Barcelona	11

La Liga 1988–89 winners
Real Madrid
24th title
