= 1987–88 La Liga =

57th season of La Liga

La Liga
- Dates: 29 August 1987 – 22 May 1988
- Champions: Real Madrid; 23rd title
- Relegated: Mallorca; Sabadell; Las Palmas
- European Cup: Real Madrid
- Cup Winners' Cup: Barcelona
- UEFA Cup: Real Sociedad; Atlético Madrid; Athletic Bilbao
- Matches: 380
- Goals: 909 (2.39 per match)
- Top goalscorer: Hugo Sánchez (29 goals)

The 1987–88 La Liga season was the 57th since its establishment. It began on 29 August 1987, and concluded on 22 May 1988.

Real Madrid finished the season as champions for the third season running, the runners-up this time being Real Sociedad, while Barcelona finished a disappointing sixth, though they did at least have Copa del Rey success as consolation for their lack of form in the league.

== Teams and location ==
This season, the league was expanded to 20 teams and the relegation playoffs returned.

Location of teams in La Liga 1987–88
Canary Islands

Team	Home city	Stadium
Athletic Bilbao	Bilbao	San Mamés
Atlético Madrid	Madrid	Vicente Calderón
Barcelona	Barcelona	Nou Camp
Cádiz	Cádiz	Ramón de Carranza
Celta Vigo	Vigo	Balaídos
Español	Barcelona	Sarrià
Las Palmas	Las Palmas	Insular
Logroñés	Logroño	Las Gaunas
Mallorca	Palma	Lluís Sitjar
Murcia	Murcia	La Condomina
Osasuna	Pamplona	El Sadar
Real Betis	Seville	Benito Villamarín
Real Madrid	Madrid	Santiago Bernabéu
Real Sociedad	San Sebastián	Atocha
Sabadell	Sabadell	Nova Creu Alta
Sevilla	Seville	Ramón Sánchez Pizjuán
Sporting Gijón	Gijón	El Molinón
Valencia	Valencia	Luis Casanova
Valladolid	Valladolid	José Zorrilla
Zaragoza	Zaragoza	La Romareda

== League table ==
Pos	Team	Pld	W	D	L	GF	GA	GD	Pts	Qualification or relegation
1	Real Madrid (C)	38	28	6	4	95	26	+69	62	Qualification for the European Cup first round
2	Real Sociedad	38	22	7	9	61	33	+28	51	Qualification for the UEFA Cup first round
3	Atlético Madrid	38	19	10	9	60	38	+22	48	Qualification for the UEFA Cup first round
4	Athletic Bilbao	38	17	12	9	50	43	+7	46	Qualification for the UEFA Cup first round
5	Osasuna	38	15	10	13	40	34	+6	40	
6	Barcelona	38	15	9	14	49	44	+5	39	Qualification for the Cup Winners' Cup first round (Note: Barcelona qualified for the European Cup Winners' Cup as champions of the Copa del Rey.)
7	Celta Vigo	38	14	11	13	43	40	+3	39	
8	Valladolid	38	13	12	13	31	34	−3	38	
9	Sporting Gijón	38	14	10	14	44	49	−5	38	
10	Sevilla	38	13	11	14	41	46	−5	37	
11	Zaragoza	38	11	14	13	54	56	−2	36	
12	Cádiz	38	11	13	14	47	54	−7	35	
13	Logroñés	38	12	9	17	28	45	−17	33	
14	Valencia	38	10	13	15	44	53	−9	33	
15	Español	38	11	11	16	44	55	−11	33	
16	Real Betis	38	14	5	19	42	54	−12	33	
17	Murcia (O)	38	9	13	16	31	42	−11	31	Qualification for the relegation playoffs
18	Mallorca (R)	38	9	12	17	35	50	−15	30	Qualification for the relegation playoffs
19	Sabadell (R)	38	9	11	18	27	48	−21	29	Relegation to the Segunda División
20	Las Palmas (R)	38	12	5	21	43	65	−22	29	Relegation to the Segunda División

Source: BDFútbol
Rules for classification: 1) Points; 2) Head-to-head results; 3) Goal difference; 4) Number of goals scored
(C) Champions; (O) Play-off winners; (R) Relegated

== Relegation playoff ==
Team 1	Agg.	Team 2	1st leg	2nd leg
Oviedo	2–1	Mallorca	2–1	0–0
Murcia	4–1	Rayo Vallecano	3–0	1–1

=== First leg ===
29 May 1988	Oviedo	2–1	Mallorca	Oviedo
	Julià 78'; Carlos 90+'	Report (in Spanish)	García Cortés 89' (pen.)	Stadium: Carlos Tartiere; Attendance: 22,000; Referee: José María Enríquez Negreira (Catalonia)

29 May 1988	Murcia	3–0	Rayo Vallecano	Murcia
	Mejías 20'; Juanjo 59'; Manolo 86'	Report (in Spanish)		Stadium: La Condomina; Attendance: 16,500; Referee: José Donato Pes Pérez (Aragon)

=== Second leg ===
4 June 1988	Mallorca	0–0 (1–2 agg.)	Oviedo	Majorca
20:00		Report (in Spanish)		Stadium: Lluís Sitjar; Attendance: 25,000; Referee: Victoriano Sánchez Arminio (Cantabria)

5 June 1988	Rayo Vallecano	1–1 (1–4 agg.)	Murcia	Madrid
	Brown 55' (o.g.)	Report (in Spanish)	Cordero 90'	Stadium: Vallecas; Attendance: 15,000; Referee: Ildefonso Urizar Azpitarte (Basque Country (autonomous community))

== Results table ==
Home \ Away	ATH	ATM	FCB	BET	CÁD	CEL	ESP	LPA	LOG	MLL	MUR	OSA	RMA	RSO	SAB	SFC	RSG	VCF	VLD	ZAR
Athletic Bilbao		5–1	1–0	2–0	0–0	1–0	2–0	4–1	1–0	2–1	1–2	2–1	0–0	1–4	2–0	2–1	1–1	1–1	1–0	2–2
Atlético Madrid	1–0		0–2	1–0	2–1	2–1	1–1	1–0	3–0	7–0	1–0	3–1	1–3	0–2	1–0	0–1	1–2	2–1	3–0	2–0
Barcelona	1–2	1–2		0–1	3–1	2–0	3–2	1–1	2–1	2–2	4–1	0–1	2–0	2–0	0–0	1–2	1–0	0–1	2–4	4–2
Betis	0–0	1–1	1–2		3–2	3–1	3–1	1–1	1–1	1–0	0–0	1–0	2–1	1–3	6–0	0–1	2–0	2–0	1–0	1–0
Cádiz	0–0	3–3	0–2	4–1		1–2	1–1	2–0	0–0	0–0	5–2	1–1	0–4	2–2	3–2	1–0	2–0	2–0	1–0	0–2
Celta de Vigo	2–1	1–0	3–1	2–0	4–1		3–0	0–1	0–0	1–1	2–0	1–0	0–0	2–0	2–0	2–0	1–3	3–3	1–1	1–1
Espanyol	1–1	0–2	2–0	4–1	2–2	0–1		1–2	0–0	3–0	1–0	0–0	0–2	0–4	1–1	3–2	1–3	3–1	4–2	2–1
Las Palmas	3–1	0–3	1–2	1–2	1–0	2–0	0–2		0–2	1–2	1–0	0–2	0–2	3–2	0–2	1–2	5–2	2–1	4–0	2–1
Logroñés	1–1	0–2	0–1	2–0	1–2	0–0	2–1	1–1		1–0	1–0	0–1	1–3	1–1	1–1	2–1	1–0	2–1	1–0	2–1
Mallorca	0–1	1–1	1–0	3–1	1–4	0–0	3–0	0–0	4–0		3–3	2–1	0–2	1–1	2–0	1–0	2–0	2–3	0–2	0–0
Murcia	2–3	0–0	0–0	2–0	0–0	1–0	0–1	2–0	2–3	0–0		1–0	1–1	1–2	2–0	1–0	0–0	0–0	1–1	1–1
Osasuna	3–1	2–1	1–1	1–0	1–1	3–0	0–0	2–1	2–0	1–0	1–0		2–1	1–2	0–0	1–3	0–0	1–1	4–1	4–1
Real Madrid	5–0	0–4	2–1	6–0	4–0	2–0	2–0	5–0	2–0	3–1	3–1	3–0		1–0	3–1	3–1	7–0	4–0	2–1	2–1
Real Sociedad	0–1	0–0	4–1	3–2	2–1	3–2	1–0	3–2	4–0	1–0	0–1	0–0	2–2		1–0	0–1	3–0	3–0	1–0	2–1
Sabadell	3–1	1–1	0–1	2–1	0–1	0–0	2–2	2–1	0–1	2–0	0–0	0–0	0–2	0–2		2–1	1–0	1–0	0–0	1–2
Sevilla	1–1	1–1	1–1	1–2	2–1	0–3	2–2	4–0	2–0	0–0	1–2	0–2	1–1	1–0	2–0		2–0	0–0	1–0	1–1
Sporting Gijón	2–2	2–0	1–0	1–0	3–0	4–1	1–2	4–1	1–0	2–1	1–1	1–0	1–2	1–1	3–0	0–0		2–2	0–0	2–1
Valencia	1–2	3–4	1–1	1–0	1–1	2–0	2–0	3–1	2–0	1–1	2–0	1–0	1–1	0–1	2–1	1–1	1–1		0–1	1–3
Valladolid	1–0	0–0	1–1	1–0	1–0	0–0	1–0	0–0	1–0	2–0	1–0	3–0	0–2	0–1	0–0	0–0	2–0	2–1		1–1
Zaragoza	1–1	2–2	1–1	3–1	1–1	1–1	1–1	1–3	1–0	1–0	2–1	1–0	1–7	1–0	1–2	8–1	2–0	2–2	1–1	

Updated to match(es) played on unknown. Source: LFP (in Spanish)
Legend: Blue = home team win; Yellow = draw; Red = away team win.

== Top goalscorers ==
Rank	Player	Club	Goals
1	(Mexico) Hugo Sánchez	Real Madrid	29
2	(Uruguay) Rubén Sosa	Zaragoza	18
3	(Spain) José Mari Bakero	Real Sociedad	17
4	(England) Gary Lineker	Barcelona	16
4	(Spain) Julio Salinas	Atlético Madrid	16
6	(Spain) Joaquín	Sporting Gijón	15
6	(Spain) Pedro Uralde	Athletic Bilbao	15
8	(Spain) Míchel	Real Madrid	14
9	(Uruguay) Pablo Bengoechea	Sevilla	12
9	(Spain) Emilio Butragueño	Real Madrid	12
9	(Chile) Jorge Contreras	Las Palmas	12
9	(Spain) Joaquín Villa	Sporting Gijón	12

La Liga 1987–88 winners
Real Madrid
23rd title
