= 1996–97 CD Tenerife season =

CD Tenerife
1996–97 season
- Manager: Jupp Heynckes
- La Liga: 8th
- Copa del Rey: Fourth round
- UEFA Cup: Semi-final
Home colours	Away colours

In the 1996–97 season, CD Tenerife failed to improve on the previous season's fifth-place finish, although they made up for the league disappointment by reaching the UEFA Cup semi-finals. Tenerife scored 69 goals in the league and could have possibly finished higher were it not for their leaky defence, which conceded more goals than all but five of the La Liga teams not relegated during the season.

At the end of the season, manager Jupp Heynckes left to join incumbent champions Real Madrid; his assistant, Ewald Lienen, also left to manage Hansa Rostock. Heynckes was replaced by Portugal manager Artur Jorge.

== First-team squad ==
Squad at end of season

Note: Flags indicate national team as defined under FIFA eligibility rules; some limited exceptions apply. Players may hold more than one non-FIFA nationality.

No.	Pos.	Nation	Player
1	GK	ARG	Marcelo Ojeda
2	DF	ESP	Julio Llorente
3	DF	ESP	Alexis
4	DF	ARG	Pablo Paz
5	DF	ESP	Antonio Mata
6	MF	YUG	Slaviša Jokanović
7	FW	CZE	Pavel Hapal
8	MF	ESP	Chano
9	FW	BIH	Meho Kodro
10	MF	ESP	Felipe Miñambres
11	FW	ESP	Juanele
12	DF	ESP	Sergio Ballesteros
13	GK	SWE	Bengt Andersson

No.	Pos.	Nation	Player
14	MF	ESP	Ángel Vivar Dorado
15	FW	GER	Oliver Neuville
16	FW	ESP	Antonio Pinilla
18	MF	ESP	Ignacio Conte
19	MF	ESP	Dani
20	MF	ESP	Antonio Robaina
21	MF	AUS	Aurelio Vidmar
22	DF	ESP	César Gómez
23	DF	RSA	Sizwe Motaung
24	DF	RSA	David Nyathi
25	FW	ESP	Domingo Hernández
29	GK	ESP	Marino
30	GK	ESP	Juan David

=== Left club during season ===
Note: Flags indicate national team as defined under FIFA eligibility rules; some limited exceptions apply. Players may hold more than one non-FIFA nationality.

No. / Pos. / Nation / Player; 7 / MF / CZE / Pavel Hapal (de-registered)	No. / Pos. / Nation / Player; 17 / DF / CHI / Francisco Rojas (to Colo-Colo)

=== Transfers ===
In
Pos.	Name	from	Type
GK	Bengt Andersson	Örgryte IS	-
FW	Oliver Neuville	Servette FC	-
FW	Meho Kodro	FC Barcelona	
DF	Pablo Paz	Club Atlético Banfield	-
FW	Aurelio Vidmar	FC Sion	
MF	Dani	Atlético Madrid	-
DF	Sizwe Motaung	FC St. Gallen	-
DF	Francisco Rojas Rojas	Colo-Colo	-
DF	David Nyathi	Kaizer Chiefs F.C.	-

Out
Pos.	Name	To	Type
DF	Carlos Aguilera	Atlético Madrid	-
FW	Juan Antonio Pizzi	FC Barcelona	-
GK	Jose Maria Buljubasich	Lleida	-
DF	Ramis	Sevilla CF	-
FW	Victor	Real Valladolid	-
MF	Diego Latorre	Boca Juniors	-

== Results ==
=== La Liga ===
==== League table ====
Pos	Team	Pld	W	D	L	GF	GA	GD	Pts	Qualification or relegation
7	Valladolid	42	18	10	14	57	46	+11	64 (Note: VLD 0–0 ATH; ATH 0–0 VLD)	Qualification for the UEFA Cup first round
8	Real Sociedad	42	18	9	15	50	47	+3	63	
9	Tenerife	42	15	11	16	69	57	+12	56 (Note: VAL 2–1 TEN; TEN 2–1 VAL)	
10	Valencia	42	15	11	16	63	59	+4	56	
11	Compostela	42	13	14	15	52	65	−13	53	

Source: LFP
Rules for classification: 1) points; 2) head-to-head points; 3) head-to-head goal difference; 4) head-to-head goals scored; 5) goal difference; 6) number of goals scored.

==== Results by round ====
Round	1	2	3	4	5	6	7	8	9	10	11	12	13	14	15	16	17	18	19	20	21	22	23	24	25	26	27	28	29	30	31	32	33	34	35	36	37	38	39	40	41	42
Ground	H	A	H	A	H	A	H	A	H	A	H	A	H	A	H	A	H	A	H	A	A	H	A	H	A	H	A	H	A	H	A	H	A	H	A	H	H	A	H	A	H	A
Result	W	W	L	L	W	D	L	L	W	D	D	D	W	L	L	W	W	W	L	D	D	W	L	W	L	W	W	D	L	D	L	W	L	L	W	D	L	L	D	L	D	W
Position	1	1	5	9	5	6	10	12	8	9	10	10	10	11	13	10	9	8	8	8	10	10	9	10	10	10	9	7	7	9	9	9	8	8	9	8	9	10	10	10	10	9

Source: Competitive matches
A = Away; H = Home; W = Win; D = Draw; L = Loss; = Leader, 1997–98 UEFA Champions League; = 1997–98 UEFA Champions League Qualifying round; = 1997–98 UEFA Cup

==== Matches ====
1 September 1996 1	Tenerife	6-0	SD Compostela	Santa Cruz de Tenerife
		Report		Stadium: Heliodoro Rodriguez

7 September 1996 2	CD Logroñes	0-1	Tenerife	Logroño
				Stadium: Las Gaunas

15 September 1996 3	Tenerife	0-2	Sevilla CF	Santa Cruz de Tenerife
				Stadium: Heliodoro Rodriguez

21 September 1996 4	Valencia CF	2-1	Tenerife	Valencia
				Stadium: Estadio Mestalla

29 September 1996 5	Tenerife	6-0	Sporting Gijón	Santa Cruz de Tenerife
				Stadium: Heliodoro Rodriguez

2 October 1996 6	FC Barcelona	1-1	Tenerife	Barcelona
				Stadium: Camp Nou

12 October 1996 7	Tenerife	1-3	Real Valladolid	Santa Cruz de Tenerife
				Stadium: Heliodoro Rodriguez

19 October 1996 8	Athletic Bilbao	2-0	Tenerife	Bilbao
				Stadium: San Mamés

23 October 1996 9	Tenerife	2-1	CF Extremadura	Santa Cruz de Tenerife
				Stadium: Heliodoro Rodriguez

26 October 1996 10	Real Madrid	0-0	Tenerife	Madrid
				Stadium: Santiago Bernabéu

3 November 1996 11	Tenerife	0-0	Celta de Vigo	Santa Cruz de Tenerife
				Stadium: Heliodoro Rodriguez

10 November 1996 12	Deportivo La Coruña	0-0	Tenerife	La Coruña
				Stadium: Riazor

16 November 1996 13	Tenerife	3-1	Hércules CF	Santa Cruz de Tenerife
				Stadium: Heliodoro Rodriguez

24 November 1996 14	Real Betis	3-1	Tenerife	Sevilla
				Stadium: Benito Villamarin

30 November 1996 15	Tenerife	1-2	Rayo Vallecano	Santa Cruz de Tenerife
				Stadium: Heliodoro Rodriguez

8 December 1996 16	Real Oviedo	1-3	Tenerife	Oviedo
				Stadium: Carlos Tartiere

22 December 1996 17	Tenerife	5-1	RCD Espanyol	Santa Cruz de Tenerife
				Stadium: Heliodoro Rodriguez

5 January 1997 18	Racing Santander	1-2	Tenerife	Santander
				Stadium: El Sardinero

11 January 1997 19	Tenerife	0-1	Real Sociedad	Santa Cruz de Tenerife
				Stadium: Heliodoro Rodriguez

19 January 1997 20	Real Zaragoza	1-1	Tenerife	Zaragoza
				Stadium: La Romareda

2 February 1997 22	SD Compostela	1-1	Tenerife	Santiago de Compostela
				Stadium: San Lázaro

9 February 1997 23	Tenerife	2-0	CD Logroñés	Santa Cruz de Tenerife
				Stadium: Heliodoro Rodriguez

15 February 1997 24	Sevilla CF	2-1	Tenerife	Sevilla
				Stadium: Sánchez Pizjuán

19 February 1997 25	Tenerife	2-1	Valencia CF	Santa Cruz de Tenerife
				Stadium: Heliodoro Rodriguez

23 February 1997 26	Sporting Gijón	2-1	Tenerife	Gijón
				Stadium: El Molinón

1 March 1997 27	Tenerife	4-0	FC Barcelona	Santa Cruz de Tenerife
				Stadium: Heliodoro Rodriguez

9 March 1997 28	Real Valladolid	0-2	Tenerife	Valladolid
				Stadium: José Zorrilla

14 March 1997 29	Tenerife	3-3	Athletic Bilbao	Santa Cruz de Tenerife
				Stadium: Heliodoro Rodriguez

23 March 1997 30	CF Extremadura	2-0	Tenerife	Almendralejo
				Stadium: Francisco de la Hera

30 March 1997 31	Tenerife	1-1	Real Madrid	Santa Cruz de Tenerife
				Stadium: Heliodoro Rodriguez

5 April 1997 32	Celta de Vigo	3-1	Tenerife	Vigo
				Stadium: Balaídos

12 April 1997 33	Tenerife	2-1	Deportivo La Coruña	Santa Cruz de Tenerife
				Stadium: Heliodoro Rodriguez

16 April 1997 34	Hércules CF	3-1	Tenerife	Alicante
				Stadium: José Rico Pérez

19 April 1997 35	Tenerife	0-1	Real Betis	Santa Cruz de Tenerife
				Stadium: Heliodoro Rodriguez

4 May 1997 36	Rayo Vallecano	1-2	Tenerife	Madrid
				Stadium: Vallecas

11 May 1997 37	Tenerife	2-2	Real Oviedo	Santa Cruz de Tenerife
				Stadium: Estadio Heliodoro Rodriguez

15 May 1997 21	Tenerife	2-3	Atlético Madrid	Santa Cruz de Tenerife
				Stadium: Estadio Heliodoro Rodriguez

18 May 1997 38	RCD Espanyol	1-0	Tenerife	Barcelona
				Stadium: Sarrià

25 May 1997 39	Tenerife	2-2	Racing Santander	Santa Cruz de Tenerife
				Stadium: Estadio Heliodoro Rodriguez

2 June 1997 40	Real Sociedad	3-0	Tenerife	San Sebastián
				Stadium: Anoeta

15 June 1997 41	Tenerife	3-3	Real Zaragoza	Santa Cruz de Tenerife
				Stadium: Estadio Heliodoro Rodriguez

23 June 1997 42	Atlético Madrid	0-3	Tenerife	Madrid
				Stadium: Vicente Calderón

=== UEFA Cup ===
==== First round ====
10 September 1996	Tenerife (Spain)	3–2	(Israel) Maccabi Tel Aviv	Santa Cruz de Tenerife
	Vivar Dorado 46'; Kodro 56'; Pinilla 66'		Mizrahi 60'; Nimni 87' (pen.)	Stadium: Heliodoro Rodriguez

24 September 1996	Maccabi Tel Aviv (Israel)	1–1	(Spain) Tenerife	Tel Aviv
	Brumer 49'		Vivar Dorado 44'	Stadium: Bloomfield Stadium

==== Second round ====
15 October 1996	Lazio (Italy)	1–0	(Spain) Tenerife	Rome
	Nedvěd 65'			Stadium: Stadio Olimpico; Attendance: 45,000; Referee: Sándor Puhl (Hungary)

29 October 1996	Tenerife (Spain)	5–3	(Italy) Lazio	Santa Cruz de Tenerife
	Nesta 15' (o.g.); Kodro 26'; Juanele 38', 62'; Jokanović 49'		Nedvěd 13'; Fuser 30'; Casiraghi 46'	Stadium: Estadio Heliodoro Rodríguez López; Attendance: 22,300; Referee: Ilkka Koho (Finland)

==== Third round ====
19 November 1996	Tenerife (Spain)	0–0	(Netherlands) Feyenoord	Santa Cruz de Tenerife
				Stadium: Estadio Heliodoro Rodríguez López

3 December 1996	Feyenoord (Netherlands)	2–4	(Spain) Tenerife	Rotterdam
	Sánchez 83'; Vos 88'		Felipe 5'; Juanele 45', 61'; Paz 74'	Stadium: De Kuip

==== Quarter-final ====
4 March 1997	Tenerife (Spain)	0–1	(Denmark) Brøndby	Santa Cruz de Tenerife
			Sand 30'	Stadium: Heliodoro Rodríguez López; Referee: Pierluigi Collina

18 March 1997	Brøndby (Denmark)	0–2 (a.e.t.)	(Spain) Tenerife	Copenhagen
			Pinilla 21'; Mata 119'	Stadium: Parken Stadium

==== Semi-final ====
8 April 1997	Tenerife (Spain)	1–0	(Germany) Schalke 04	Santa Cruz de Tenerife
	Felipe 6' (pen.)			Stadium: Heliodoro Rodríguez López; Attendance: 21,000

22 April 1997	Schalke 04 (Germany)	2–0 (a.e.t.)	(Spain) Tenerife	Gelsenkirchen
	Linke 68'; Wilmots 107'			Stadium: Parkstadion; Attendance: 56,800

=== Copa del Rey ===
==== Eightfinals ====
30 January 1997	CD Tenerife	0–2	Real Betis	Tenerife
				Stadium: Heliodoro Rodriguez

5 February 1997	Real Betis	3–0	CD Tenerife	Sevilla
				Stadium: Benito Villamarin

== Statistics ==
=== Players statistics ===
No.	Pos	Nat	Player	Total		La Liga		Copa del Rey		UEFA Cup	
No.	Pos	Nat	Player	Apps	Goals	Apps	Goals	Apps	Goals	Apps	Goals
1	GK	(Argentina) ARG	Ojeda	44	-56	35	-46	0	0	9	-10
2	DF	(Spain) ESP	Llorente	36	3	30	3	1	0	4+1	0
5	DF	(Spain) ESP	Mata	41	1	31+1	0	0	0	8+1	1
22	DF	(Spain) ESP	César Gómez	39	0	29+1	0	1	0	8	0
3	DF	(Spain) ESP	Alexis Suarez	43	1	25+6	1	2	0	6+4	0
8	MF	(Spain) ESP	Chano	47	5	35+1	5	1	0	10	0
14	MF	(Spain) ESP	Vivar Dorado	40	6	25+8	4	0+1	0	6	2
6	MF	(Federal Republic of Yugoslavia) YUG	Jokanovic	39	11	29+1	10	1	0	8	1
10	MF	(Spain) ESP	Felipe	42	9	30+2	7	1	0	8+1	2
11	FW	(Spain) ESP	Juanele	46	12	31+4	8	2	0	9	4
16	FW	(Spain) ESP	Pinilla	43	9	23+8	7	0+2	0	9+1	2
13	GK	(Sweden) SWE	Andersson	9	-15	5	-8	2	-5	1+1	-2
12	DF	(Spain) ESP	Ballesteros	40	1	22+9	1	2	0	5+2	0
15	FW	(Switzerland) SUI	Neuville	43	5	21+12	5	1+1	0	3+5	0
9	FW	(Bosnia and Herzegovina) BIH	Kodro	34	8	21+4	6	0+1	0	6+2	2
4	DF	(Argentina) ARG	Pablo Paz	32	4	15+8	3	1+1	0	5+2	1
23	DF	(South Africa) RSA	Motaung	17	0	12+1	0	1	0	3	0
19	MF	(Spain) ESP	Dani	23	1	10+10	1	1	0	0+2	0
20	MF	(Spain) ESP	Robaina	26	3	9+12	3	2	0	0+3	0
21	MF	(Australia) AUS	Vidmar	32	1	9+16	1	2	0	0+5	0
17	DF	(Chile) CHI	Rojas	9	1	6+1	1	0	0	2	0
18	MF	(Spain) ESP	Conte	14	1	4+9	1	1	0		
24	DF	(South Africa) RSA	Nyathi	5	0	3+2	0				
25	GK	(Spain) ESP	Hernández	1	-3	1	-3				
26	FW	(Slovakia) SVK	Banzik								
27	DF	(North Macedonia) MKD	Vikurov								
28	MF	(Federal Republic of Yugoslavia) YUG	Jodzic								
29	GK	(Spain) ESP	Marino	1	0	1	0				
30	GK	(Spain) ESP	Juan David								
7	FW	(Czech Republic) CZE	Hapal								

- Source: https://www.bdfutbol.com/en/t/t1996-9735.html?tab=partits

=== Goal scorers ===
==== La Liga ====
- Juanele 8
- Meho Kodro 6
- Antonio Pinilla 7
- Oliver Neuville 5
- Aurelio Vidmar 1

== See also ==
- CD Tenerife
- 1996–97 La Liga
- 1996–97 Copa del Rey
