= 1995–96 CD Tenerife season =

CD Tenerife
1995–96 season
- President: Javier Perez Perez
- Manager: Jupp Heynckes
- Stadium: Heliodoro Rodriguez
- La Liga: 5th (In UEFA Cup)
- Copa del Rey: Quarterfinals
- Top goalscorer: League: Pizzi (31); All: Pizzi (36)
Home colours	Away colours

In the 1995–96 season, CD Tenerife competed in La Liga and Copa del Rey.

== Summary ==
During summer the club board sacked Vicente Cantatore after a disappointing season that included relegation issues and appointed Eintracht Frankfurt German head coach Jupp Heynckes who managed Athletic Bilbao in 1992–94. Arrivals included Yugoslav midfielder Slavisa Jokanovic from Real Oviedo after a failed bid by Atletico Madrid's new trainer Radomir Antic, Pavel Hapal and defender Alexis Suarez. On the contrary, several players left the club: midfielders Diego Latorre, Jose del Solar, Percy Olivares and left-back Paqui. The squad delivered a decent league season finishing in 5th position enough to clinch a 1995-96 UEFA Cup spot ahead of Real Madrid and Real Betis.

Meanwhile, in Copa del Rey the team defeated incumbent champions and heavy favourites Deportivo La Coruña in Eightfinals and reached the quarterfinals only to be defeated 0–3 in two legs by upcoming champions Atletico Madrid.

Also, Argentinian Striker Juan Antonio Pizzi won the Pichichi Trophy after scored 31 league goals.

== Squad ==
Note: Flags indicate national team as defined under FIFA eligibility rules; some limited exceptions apply. Players may hold more than one non-FIFA nationality.

No.	Pos.	Nation	Player
1	GK	ARG	Marcelo Ojeda
2	DF	ESP	Julio Llorente
3	DF	ESP	Alexis Suárez
4	DF	ESP	Ramis
5	DF	ESP	Antonio Mata
6	MF	YUG	Slaviša Jokanović
7	MF	CZE	Pavel Hapal
8	MF	ESP	Chano
9	FW	ARG	Juan Antonio Pizzi
10	MF	ESP	Felipe
11	FW	ESP	Juanele
13	GK	ARG	Buljubasich

No.	Pos.	Nation	Player
14	MF	ESP	Vivar Dorado
15	DF	ESP	Carlos Aguilera
16	FW	ESP	Pinilla
17	MF	ESP	Toni
18	DF	ESP	Conte
19	MF	ARG	Diego Latorre
20	MF	ESP	Robaina
21	MF	ESP	Víctor
22	DF	ESP	César Gómez
26	MF	ESP	Ballesteros
27	FW	ESP	David Dorta
—	FW	ESP	Domingo

=== Transfers ===
In
Pos.	Name	from	Type
MF	Slavisa Jokanovic	Real Oviedo	-
MF	Pavel Hapal	Bayer Leverkusen	-
DF	Alexis Suarez	UD Las Palmas	-
MF	Antonio Robaina	UD Las Palmas	-

Out
Pos.	Name	To	Type
MF	Diego Latorre	UD Salamanca	
DF	Paqui	Real Zaragoza	-
MF	Jose Del Solar	UD Salamanca	-
MF	Ezequiel Castillo	Rayo Vallecano	-
DF	Percy Olivares	Rosario Central	-

==== Winter ====
In
Pos.	Name	from	Type
DF	Sergio Ballesteros	Levante UD	loan

Out
Pos.	Name	To	Type
MF	Victor	CD Toledo	loan

== Results ==
=== La Liga ===
==== League table ====
Pos	Team	Pld	W	D	L	GF	GA	GD	Pts	Qualification or relegation
3	Barcelona	42	22	14	6	72	39	+33	80	Qualification for the Cup Winners' Cup first round (Note: Since Atlético Madrid, winners of 1995–96 Copa del Rey, was qualified for the 1996–97 UEFA Champions League, losing cup finalists Barcelona earned a spot in the first round of the 1996–97 UEFA Cup Winners' Cup.)
4	Espanyol	42	20	14	8	63	36	+27	74	Qualification for the UEFA Cup first round
5	Tenerife	42	20	12	10	69	54	+15	72	Qualification for the UEFA Cup first round
6	Real Madrid	42	20	10	12	75	51	+24	70	
7	Real Sociedad	42	17	12	13	62	53	+9	63	

Source: LFP
Rules for classification: 1) points; 2) head-to-head points; 3) head-to-head goal difference; 4) head-to-head goals scored; 5) goal difference; 6) number of goals scored.

==== Results by round ====
Round	1	2	3	4	5	6	7	8	9	10	11	12	13	14	15	16	17	18	19	20	21	22	23	24	25	26	27	28	29	30	31	32	33	34	35	36	37	38	39	40	41	42
Ground	H	A	H	A	H	A	H	A	H	A	H	A	H	A	H	A	H	A	H	A	A	H	A	H	A	H	A	H	A	H	A	H	A	H	A	H	H	A	H	A	H	A
Result	W	L	D	D	L	W	W	D	L	D	D	D	D	D	W	W	L	W	W	L	W	W	L	W	D	W	L	L	W	W	W	L	D	W	W	W	L	D	W	W	D	W
Position	9	15	12	12	17	12	8	10	12	12	12	11	10	11	11	8	10	9	9	9	9	6	9	9	8	7	8	8	8	7	7	8	7	6	6	5	5	5	5	5	5	5

Source: Competitive matches
A = Away; H = Home; W = Win; D = Draw; L = Loss; = Leader, 1996–97 UEFA Champions League; = 1996–97 UEFA Cup

==== Matches ====
03 September 1995 1	Sevilla	0–1	Tenerife	Sevilla
	Jimenez (yellow card)		88' (o.g.) Jimenez; (yellow card) Alexis Suarez; (yellow card) Jokanovic; (yellow card) Carlos Aguilera; 12' Juanele	Stadium: Sanchez Pizjuan; Referee: Garcia Aranda

10 September 1995 2	Tenerife	1–4	Espanol	Santa Cruz
	Víctor 61'		21' Arteaga; 22' Răducioiu; 68' Lardín; 80' Benítez	Stadium: Heliodoro Rodriguez; Referee: López Nieto

17 September 1995 3	Celta de Vigo	2–2	Tenerife	Vigo
	Juan Sánchez 9'; Bajčetić 37'		27' Pizzi; 44' (o.g.) Berges	Stadium: Balaidos; Referee: Japón Sevilla

24 September 1995 4	Tenerife	1–1	Deportivo de La Coruña	Santa Cruz
	Pizzi 73'		88' Bebeto	Stadium: Heliodoro Rodriguez; Referee: Iturralde González

01 October 1995 5	Valladolid	3–0	Tenerife	Valladolid
	Peternac 28'; Quevedo 37'; Asanović 89'			Stadium: Jose Zorrilla; Referee: Puentes Leira

04 October 1995 6	Tenerife	1–0	Mérida	Santa Cruz
	Pizzi 39' (pen.)			Stadium: Heliodoro Rodriguez; Referee: Gómez López

08 October 1995 7	Zaragoza	0–2	Tenerife	Zaragoza
			55' Pizzi; 86' Pinilla	Stadium: La Romareda; Referee: Megía Dávila

15 October 1995 8	Tenerife	2–2	Rayo Vallecano	Santa Cruz
	Jokanović 56'; Felipe 72'		74' Andrijašević; 82' Aquino	Stadium: Heliodoro Rodriguez; Referee: Barrenechea Montero

22 October 1995 9	Real Madrid	2–0	Tenerife	Madrid
	Esnáider 10'; Sandro 83'			Stadium: Santiago Bernabeu; Referee: Fernández Marín

29 October 1995 10	Tenerife	3–3	Oviedo	Santa Cruz
	Julio Llorente 14'; Felipe 74'; Julio Llorente 77'		54' Manel; 68' Oli; 89' (pen.) Dubovský	Stadium: Heliodoro Rodriguez; Referee: López de la Fuente

05 November 1995 11	Betis	3–3	Tenerife	Sevilla
	Alfonso 5'; Alexis 11'; Alexis 66' (pen.)		35' Pizzi; 47' Aguilera; 78' (pen.) Pizzi	Stadium: Benito Villamarin; Referee: Díaz Vega

12 November 1995 12	Tenerife	1–1	FC Barcelona	Santa Cruz
	Julio Llorente 48'		36' Roger	Stadium: Heliodoro Rodriguez; Referee: Ansuategui Roca

19 November 1995 13	Valencia	2–2	Tenerife	Valencia
	Galvez 47'; Cesar Gomez 57' (o.g.)		21' Pizzi; 49' Pizzi	Stadium: Mestalla; Referee: Prados Garcia

26 November 1995 14	Tenerife	1–1	Compostela	Santa Cruz
	Vivar Dorado 48'		39' Ohen	Stadium: Heliodoro Rodriguez; Referee: Marin Lopez

03 December 1995 15	Salamanca	1–2	Tenerife	Salamanca
	Del Solar 8'		31' Pizzi; 49' (pen.) Pizzi

10 December 1995 16	Tenerife	3–2	Athletic Bilbao	Santa Cruz
	Juanele 8'; Pizzi 11' (pen.); Pinilla 49'		31' Larrazabal; 84' Oskar Vales	Stadium: Heliodoro Rodriguez; Referee: Gracia Redondo

17 December 1995 17	Tenerife	1–3	Albacete	Santa Cruz
	Pinilla 22'		27' Bjelica; 60' Bjelica; 89' Mario	Stadium: Heliodoro Rodriguez; Referee: Andradas Asurmendi

20 December 1995 18	Real Sociedad	0–1	Tenerife	San Sebastian
			54' Carlos Aguilera	Stadium: Anoeta; Referee: Esquinas Torres

03 January 1996 19	Tenerife	2–0	Racing de Santander	Santa Cruz
	Juanele 15'; Pizzi 53'			Stadium: Heliodoro Rodriguez; Referee: Diaz Vega

06 January 1996 20	Atlético de Madrid	3–1	Tenerife	Madrid
	Juan Carlos 24'; Lopez 82'; Penev 89'		52' Juanele	Stadium: Vicente Calderon; Referee: Puentes Leira

14 January 1996 21	Tenerife	3–0	Sporting de Gijón	Santa Cruz
	Chano 8'; Ramis 84'; Pizzi 89'			Stadium: Heliodoro Rodriguez; Referee: Nunez Manrique

21 January 1996 22	Tenerife	4–2	Sevilla	Santa Cruz
	Pizzi 11' (pen.); Pizzi 14'; Pizzi 54' (pen.); Pizzi 84'		76' Moya; 86' Moya	Stadium: Heliodoro Rodriguez

24 January 1996 23	Espanyol	2–1	Tenerife	Barcelona
	Lardin 74'; Pochettino 89'		12' Mata; (yellow card) 89' (yellow-red card) Alexis Suarez	Stadium: Sarriá; Referee: Gomez Lopez

28 January 1996 24	Tenerife	1–0	Celta de Vigo	Santa Cruz
	Mata 28'			Stadium: Heliodoro Rodriguez; Referee: Fernandez Marin

4 February 1996 25	Deportivo La Coruña	1 – 1	Tenerife	A Coruña
	Manjarín 64'; López Rekarte (yellow card)	Report	25' Aguilera; (yellow card) Conte; (yellow card) Robaina	Stadium: Estadio Riazor; Referee: Celino Gracia Redondo

11 February 1996 26	Tenerife	1–0	Valladolid	Santa Cruz
	Juanele 4'			Stadium: Heliodoro Rodriguez; Referee: Mejuto Gonzalez

18 February 1996 27	Mérida	2–0	Tenerife	Merida
	Prieto 34'; Prieto 42'			Stadium: Municipal; Referee: Japon Sevilla

25 February 1996 28	Tenerife	1–2	Zaragoza	Santa Cruz
	Juanele 40'; Alexis Suarez (yellow card) 50' (yellow-red card)		10' Poyet; 67' Caceres	Stadium: Heliodoro Rodriguez; Referee: Megia Davila

03 March 1996 29	Rayo Vallecano	2–4	Tenerife	Madrid
	Guilherme 51'; Guilherme 88'		19' Jokanović; 63' (pen.) Pizzi; 68' Pinilla; 83' Pizzi	Stadium: Campo Vallecas; Referee: López Nieto

10 March 1996 30	Tenerife	3–0	Real Madrid	Santa Cruz
	Robaina 44'; Pizzi 54'; Pizzi 87'		(yellow card) 42' (yellow-red card) Alkorta; (red card) 57' Hierro	Stadium: Heliodoro Rodriguez; Referee: Dauden Ibanez

17 March 1996 31	Real Oviedo	1–3	Tenerife	Oviedo
	Christiansen 14'; Jerkan 35'; Oli 71' (pen.)		44' Juanele; 61' Pizzi; 73' Pinilla	Stadium: Carlos Tartiere; Referee: Rubio Valdivieso

23 March 1996 32	Tenerife	1–2	Real Betis	Santa Cruz
	Pizzi 16'; Ramis (red card) 32'		87' Sabas; 89' Kowalczyk	Stadium: Heliodoro Rodriguez; Referee: Marín López

27 March 1996 33	FC Barcelona	2–2	Tenerife	Barcelona
	Amor 20'; Celades 35'		6' Pizzi; 31' Pinilla	Stadium: Camp Nou; Referee: Lopez de la Fuente

31 March 1996 34	Tenerife	2-1	Valencia	Santa Cruz
	Cesar Gomez (yellow card) 42'; Pizzi (yellow card) 60'; Chano (yellow card) 66'; Llorente 74'; Carlos Aguilera (yellow card) 76'; Alexis Suarez (yellow card) 77'; Pizzi 80'	Report	17' Fernando; (yellow card) 21' Mendieta; (yellow card) 23' Javi Navarro; (yellow card) 26' Viola; (yellow card) 28' Mazinho; (yellow card) 45' Poyatos; (yellow card) 89' Romero	Stadium: Heliodoro Rodriguez Lopez; Referee: Diaz Vega

07 April 1996 35	Compostela	0–2	Tenerife	Santiago de Compostela
			25' Carlos Aguilera; 35' Pizzi 35	Stadium: San Lázaro; Referee: Ansuategui Roca

14 April 1996 36	Tenerife	4–0	Salamanca	Santa Cruz
	Pizzi 22'; Juanele 28'; Pizzi 70'; Hapal 81'		(yellow card) 38' (yellow-red card) Torrecilla	Stadium: Heliodoro Rodriguez; Referee: Fernández Marín

21 April 1996 37	Athletic Bilbao	2–0	Tenerife	Bilbao
	1-0 Valverde 41'; Ziganda 69'			Stadium: San Mames; Referee: Gracia Redondo

28 April 1996 38	Albacete	0–0	Tenerife	Albacete

05 May 1996 39	Tenerife	1–0	Real Sociedad	Santa Cruz
	Pizzi 71'			Stadium: Heliodoro Rodriguez; Referee: Lopez Nieto

12 May 1996 40	Racing de Santander	1–2	Tenerife	Santander
	Fayzulin 10'		78'Pizzi; 82'Chano	Stadium: El Sardinero; Referee: Nunez Manrique

18 May 1996 41	Tenerife	1–1	Atlético de Madrid	Santa Cruz
	Pizzi 50'		88' (o.g.) Cesar Gomez	Stadium: Heliodoro Rodriguez; Referee: López Nieto

25 May 1996 42	Sporting de Gijón	0–2	Tenerife	Gijon
			17' Carlos Aguilera; 47' Pinilla	Stadium: El Molinon; Referee: Andradas Asurmendi

=== Copa del Rey ===
==== Round 2 ====
25 October 1995 1	Vélez	1–2	Tenerife
	Berruezo 89'		0-1 Pizzi 49'; Víctor 58'	Referee: Nunez Manrique

08 November 1995 2	Tenerife	8–0	Vélez	Santa Cruz de Tenerife
	Pinilla 26'; Víctor 30'; Víctor 31'; Pinilla 37'; Antonio Mata 57'; Pizzi 77'; Pizzi 84'; Víctor 89'			Stadium: Heliodoro Rodriguez; Referee: Esquinas Torres

==== Round of 32 ====
29 November 1995 1	Levante	1–0	Tenerife
	Guerrero 85' (pen.)		(yellow card) 82' (yellow-red card) Mata	Referee: García Aranda

13 December 1995 2	Tenerife	6–1	Levante
	1-0 Hapal 7'; Robaina 25'; Chano 39'; Hapal 51'; Pizzi 68'; Ramis 79'		Nacho Sierra 69'	Referee: Mejuto González

==== Eightfinals ====
10 January 1996	Deportivo La Coruña	1–1	Tenerife	A Coruña
21:00 CET	Donato 85' (pen.)	Report (in Spanish)	31' (pen.) Pizzi	Stadium: Riazor; Attendance: — Referee: Prados García (Andalusia)

17 January 1996	Tenerife	2–1	Deportivo La Coruña	Santa Cruz de Tenerife
22:00 CET	Juanele 40'; Jokanović 48'	Report (in Spanish)	Donato 27'	Stadium: Heliodoro Rodríguez López; Attendance: 18,000; Referee: López Nieto (Andalusia)

==== Quarterfinals ====
31 January 1996	Tenerife	0–0	Atletico Madrid	Santa Cruz de Tenerife
23:00 CET		Report (in Spanish)		Stadium: Heliodoro Rodríguez López; Attendance: 22,000; Referee: Díaz Vega (Asturias)

15 February 1996	Atletico Madrid	3–0	Tenerife	Madrid
21:30 CET	Penev 18', 41', 76'	Report (in Spanish)		Stadium: Vicente Calderón; Attendance: 15,000; Referee: Gracia Redondo (Aragon)

== Statistics ==
=== Players statistics ===
No.	Pos	Nat	Player	Total		La Liga		Copa del Rey	
No.	Pos	Nat	Player	Apps	Goals	Apps	Goals	Apps	Goals
1	GK	(Argentina) ARG	Marcelo Ojeda	45	-57	41	-52	4	-5
15	DF	(Spain) ESP	Carlos Aguilera	45	5	29+10	5	3+3	0
2	DF	(Spain) ESP	Julio Llorente	44	4	39	4	5	0
3	DF	(Spain) ESP	Alexis Suárez	32	0	23+2	0	6+1	0
22	DF	(Spain) ESP	César Gómez	41	0	36	0	4+1	0
10	MF	(Spain) ESP	Felipe Miñambres	39	2	31+4	2	3+1	0
8	MF	(Spain) ESP	Chano	43	3	34+4	2	5	1
6	MF	(Federal Republic of Yugoslavia) YUG	Slaviša Jokanović	38	3	31+3	2	4	1
7	MF	(Czech Republic) CZE	Pavel Hapal	38	3	26+5	1	7	2
20	MF	(Spain) ESP	Antonio Robaina	44	2	25+14	1	2+3	1
9	FW	(Argentina) ARG	Juan Antonio Pizzi	48	36	39+2	31	4+3	5
13	GK	(Argentina) ARG	Buljubasich	2	-3	1	-2	1	-1
16	FW	(Spain) ESP	Antonio Pinilla	43	9	23+13	7	6+1	2
5	DF	(Spain) ESP	Antonio Mata	30	3	20+4	2	6	1
11	FW	(Spain) ESP	Juanele	30	8	20+5	7	5	1
4	DF	(Spain) ESP	Ramis	32	2	18+7	1	5+2	1
14	DF	(Spain) ESP	Vivar Dorado	37	1	15+14	1	7+1	0
	GK	(Spain) ESP	Domingo	4	-2	0+1	0	3	-2
18	DF	(Spain) ESP	Conte	22	0	4+12	0	3+3	0
21	MF	(Spain) ESP	Víctor	13	5	3+6	1	3+1	4
26	MF	(Spain) ESP	Ballesteros	6	0	3+3	0		
19	MF	(Argentina) ARG	Diego Latorre	3	0	1+1	0	1	0
27	FW	(Spain) ESP	David Dorta	0	0	0	0		
17	MF	(Spain) ESP	Toni	2	0	0	0	1+1	0
	MF	(Spain) ESP	Correa	1	0	0	0	0+1	0

- Source: http://www.footballsquads.co.uk/spain/1995-1996/laliga/tenerife.htm
