= 1989–90 Real Madrid CF season =

88th season in existence of Real Madrid CF

Real Madrid
1989–90 season
- President: Ramón Mendoza
- Head Coach: John Toshack
- La Liga: 1st (into European Cup)
- Copa del Rey: Runners-up
- Supercopa de España: Winners
- European Cup: Round of 16
- Top goalscorer: League: Hugo Sánchez (38); All: Hugo Sánchez (42)
Home colours	Away colours

The 1989–90 season was Real Madrid Club de Fútbol's 88th season in existence and the club's 59th consecutive season in the top flight of Spanish football.

== Season ==
Real Madrid finished the campaign as league champions for the fifth season running, claiming their 25th league title overall. Furthermore, under the helm of new coach John Benjamin Toshack, the team broke the record for most league goals in a season, with 107. Mexican striker Hugo Sánchez scored 38 of them, equaling Telmo Zarra's record, and won the European Golden Boot. Real Madrid were also aiming to clinch the second consecutive domestic double, going all the way to the Copa del Rey final where they were beaten by Barcelona 0–2.

== Squad ==
Note: Flags indicate national team as defined under FIFA eligibility rules; some limited exceptions apply. Players may hold more than one non-FIFA nationality.

No.	Pos.	Nation	Player
-	GK	ESP	Francisco Buyo
-	GK	ESP	Agustín
-	GK	ESP	Julen Lopetegui
-	DF	ESP	Chendo
-	DF	ESP	Fernando Hierro
-	DF	ARG	Oscar Ruggeri
-	DF	ESP	Manuel Sanchis
-	DF	ESP	Jesús Ángel Solana
-	DF	ESP	Julio Llorente
-	DF	ESP	Miguel Tendillo
-	DF	ESP	Algar

No.	Pos.	Nation	Player
-	MF	ESP	Rafael Martín Vázquez
-	MF	ESP	Míchel
-	MF	FRG	Bernd Schuster
-	MF	ESP	Rafael Gordillo
-	MF	ESP	Paco Llorente
-	MF	ESP	Adolfo Aldana
-	MF	ESP	Joaquin Parra
-	FW	MEX	Hugo Sánchez
-	FW	ESP	Emilio Butragueño
-	FW	ESP	Sebastián Losada
-	FW	ESP	Albert Aguilá

=== Transfers ===
In
Pos.	Name	from	Type
MF	Fernando Hierro	Real Valladolid	€2,0 million
DF	Oscar Ruggeri	CD Logroñés	
GK	Julen Lopetegui	UD Las Palmas	
MF	Joaquin Parra	Atlético Madrid	

Out
Pos.	Name	To	Type
DF	Jose Antonio Camacho		retired
DF	Ricardo Gallego	Udinese	
DF	Maqueda	CD Logroñés	loan
GK	Santiago Cañizares	Real Madrid Castilla	loan

== Competitions ==
=== La Liga ===
==== Results by round ====
Round	1	2	3	4	5	6	7	8	9	10	11	12	13	14	15	16	17	18	19	20	21	22	23	24	25	26	27	28	29	30	31	32	33	34	35	36	37	38
Ground	H	A	H	A	H	A	A	H	A	H	A	H	A	H	A	H	A	A	H	A	H	A	H	H	A	H	A	H	A	H	A	H	A	H	A	H	H	H
Result	W	D	W	D	W	L	W	W	W	L	W	W	W	D	W	W	W	W	W	D	W	D	D	W	W	W	W	W	W	D	W	W	W	D	D	W	D	W
Position	3	4	2	2	1	2	1	1	1	1	1	1	1	1	1	1	1	1	1	1	1	1	1	1	1	1	1	1	1	1	1	1	1	1	1	1	1	1

Source: BDFutbol
A = Away; H = Home; W = Win; D = Draw; L = Loss; = Leader, 1990-91 European Cup; = 1990-91 UEFA Cup; = relegation to 1990-91 Segunda Division

==== League table ====
Pos	Team	Pld	W	D	L	GF	GA	GD	Pts	Qualification or relegation
1	Real Madrid (C)	38	26	10	2	107	38	+69	62	Qualification for the European Cup first round
2	Valencia	38	20	13	5	67	42	+25	53	Qualification for the UEFA Cup first round
3	Barcelona	38	23	5	10	83	39	+44	51	Qualification for the Cup Winners' Cup first round (Note: Barcelona qualified for the European Cup Winners' Cup as champions of the Copa del Rey.)
4	Atlético Madrid	38	20	10	8	55	35	+20	50	Qualification for the UEFA Cup first round
5	Real Sociedad	38	15	14	9	43	35	+8	44	Qualification for the UEFA Cup first round

Source: BDFútbol
Rules for classification: 1) Points; 2) Head-to-head results; 3) Goal difference; 4) Number of goals scored
(C) Champions

==== Matches ====
2 September 1989 1	Real Madrid	2–0	Sporting Gijón	Madrid
	Míchel 5'; Hugo Sánchez 26'	Report		Stadium: Estadio Santiago Bernabéu; Referee: Antonio Martin Navarrete

8 September 1989 2	CD Castellón	0–0	Real Madrid	Castellón de la Plana
		Report		Stadium: Nou Estadi Castalia; Referee: Jaime Bayarri Rivelles

16 September 1989 3	Real Madrid	6–2	Valencia CF	Madrid
	Butragueño 7'; Míchel 10'; Schuster 39'; Míchel 71'; Hugo Sánchez 83'; Hugo Sánchez 85'	Report	Toni 23'; Arroyo 44'	Stadium: Estadio Santiago Bernabéu; Referee: Enriquez Negreira

23 September 1989 4	RCD Mallorca	0–0	Real Madrid	Palma
		Report		Stadium: Lluis Sitjar; Referee: Jose Merino Gonzalez

1 October 1989 5	Real Madrid	4–1	Cádiz CF	Madrid
	Schuster 7'; Hugo Sánchez 39'; Aldana 74'; Hugo Sánchez 89'	Report	José Manuel 26'	Stadium: Estadio Santiago Bernabéu; Referee: Peraita Ibañez

7 October 1989 6	FC Barcelona	3–1	Real Madrid	Barcelona
	Julio Salinas 10'; Koeman 74' (pen.); Koeman 89' (pen.); Aloisio (yellow card); Alexanko (yellow card); Eusebio Sacristán (yellow card); Roberto (yellow card)	Report	Hugo Sánchez 5' (pen.) (yellow card); Schuster (yellow card) 89' (yellow-red card)	Stadium: Camp Nou; Referee: Urizar Azpitarte

14 October 1989 7	Real Madrid	4–0	CD Málaga	Madrid
	Ruggeri 16'; Losada 34'; Losada 42'; Aldana 76'	Report		Stadium: Estadio Santiago Bernabéu; Referee: Tomas Jimenez Moreno

22 October 1989 8	Rayo Vallecano	1–2	Real Madrid	Madrid
	Soto 89'	Report	Hugo Sánchez 18'; Hierro 33'	Stadium: Vallecas; Referee: Ildefonso Urizar

28 October 1989 9	Real Madrid	5–2	Sevilla FC	Madrid
	Aldana 18'; Martín Vázquez 57'; Butragueño 59'; Llorente 69'; Hugo Sánchez 84'	Report	Polster 10'; Anton Polster 67'	Stadium: Estadio Santiago Bernabéu

3 November 1989 10	Real Sociedad	2–1	Real Madrid	San Sebastián
	Aldridge 15'; Gajate 25'	Report	Losada 88'	Stadium: Atotxa; Referee: Severiano Perez Sanchez

10 November 1989 11	Real Madrid	4–0	Athletic Bilbao	Madrid
	Míchel 19'; Hugo Sánchez 62'; Hugo Sánchez 70'; Chendo 78'	Report		Stadium: Estadio Santiago Bernabéu

18 November 1989 12	CD Tenerife	2–3	Real Madrid	Santa Cruz de Tenerife
	Luis Delgado 47'; Guina 48'	Report	Butragueño 46'; Hugo Sánchez 76'; Hugo Sánchez 80'	Stadium: Estadio Heliodoro Rodriguez Lopez; Referee: Antonio Taboada Soto

24 November 1989 13	Real Madrid	7–2	Real Zaragoza	Madrid
	Míchel 4'; Manolo Sanchís 20'; Butragueño 35'; Martín Vázquez 43'; Hugo Sánchez 45'; Hugo Sánchez 88'; Martín Vázquez 89'	Report	Higuera 33'; Higuera 50'; Alfaro (yellow card) 64' (yellow-red card)	Stadium: Estadio Santiago Bernabéu

2 December 1989 14	Celta Vigo	0–0	Real Madrid	Vigo
		Report		Stadium: Estadio Balaídos; Referee: Antonio Martin Navarrete

9 December 1989 15	Real Madrid	4–0	Real Valladolid	Madrid
	Schuster 17'; Moreno 28' (o.g.); Hugo Sánchez 42'; Martín Vázquez 66'	Report		Stadium: Estadio Santiago Bernabéu; Referee: Jose Perez Sanchez

16 December 1989 16	CD Logroñés	1–5	Real Madrid	Logroño
	Quique Setién 81' (pen.)	Report	Hugo Sánchez 8'; Sanchis 35'; Hugo Sánchez 36'; Hugo Sánchez 59'; Butragueño 78'	Stadium: Las Gaunas; Referee: Jose Merino Gonzalez

29 December 1989 17	Real Madrid	4–1	CA Osasuna	Madrid
	Domínguez 3' (o.g.); Míchel 23'; Hugo Sánchez 34'; Hierro 60'	Report	Domínguez 75' (pen.)	Stadium: Estadio Santiago Bernabéu; Referee: Victoriano Sanchez Arminio

5 January 1990 18	Real Madrid	3–1	Atlético Madrid	Madrid
	Martín Vázquez 2'; Martín Vázquez 7'; Schuster 74'	Report	Bustingorri 49'	Stadium: Estadio Santiago Bernabéu

12 January 1990 19	Real Oviedo	0–1	Real Madrid	Oviedo
		Report	Butragueño 9'	Stadium: Carlos Tartiere; Referee: Miguel Marín López

19 January 1990 20	Sporting Gijón	1–1	Real Madrid	Gijón
	Abelardo 35'	Report	Hugo Sánchez 85'	Stadium: Estadio El Molinón; Referee: Jose Socorro Gonzalez

27 January 1990 21	Real Madrid	7–0	CD Castellón	Madrid
	Butragueño 12' Schuster 38'; Martín Vázquez 42'; Martín Vázquez 57'; Hugo Sánchez 69'; Hugo Sánchez 87' Hugo Sánchez 89'	Report		Stadium: Estadio Santiago Bernabéu; Referee: Joaquin Urio Velazquez

30 January 1990 22	Valencia CF	1–1	Real Madrid	Valencia
	Eloy 67'	Report	Hugo Sánchez 65'	Stadium: Estadio Luis Casanova; Referee: José Pajarez Paz

3 February 1990 23	Real Madrid	1–1	RCD Mallorca	Madrid
	Hierro 33'	Report	Barragán 43'	Stadium: Estadio Santiago Bernabéu; Referee: Jose Miguel Perez

9 February 1990 24	Cádiz CF	0–3	Real Madrid	Cádiz
		Report	Martín Vázquez 24'; Butragueño 47'; Martín Vázquez 81'	Stadium: Ramón de Carranza Stadium; Referee: Eusebio Alvarez Diaz

14 February 1990 25	Real Madrid	3–2	FC Barcelona	Madrid
	Míchel 24'; Butragueño 45'; Hugo Sánchez 46' (pen.); Buyo (yellow card); Ruggeri (yellow card); Sanchis (yellow card); Martín Vázquez (yellow card)	Report	Julio Salinas 54'; Julio Salinas 57'; Zubizarreta (yellow card); Aloísio (yellow card) (yellow-red card); Koeman (yellow card) (yellow-red card); Bakero (yellow card)	Stadium: Estadio Santiago Bernabéu

17 February 1990 26	CD Málaga	1–2	Real Madrid	Málaga
	Álvarez 45'	Report	Hugo Sánchez 24'; Hugo Sánchez 43'	Stadium: La Rosaleda; Referee: Juan Andújar Oliver

24 February 1990 27	Real Madrid	5–2	Rayo Vallecano	Madrid
	Ibarrondo 8' (o.g.); Schuster 17'; Hugo Sánchez 64'; Losada 76'; Losada 89'	Report	Sabas 24'; Juanito 87'	Stadium: Estadio Santiago Bernabéu

2 March 1990 28	Sevilla FC	1–2	Real Madrid	Sevilla
	Pablo Bengoechea 36'	Report	Butragueño 84'; Hugo Sánchez 87'	Stadium: Estadio Sánchez Pizjuán

10 March 1990 29	Real Madrid	3–0	Real Sociedad	Madrid
	Martín Vázquez 20'; Hugo Sánchez 38'; Hierro 56'	Report		Stadium: Estadio Santiago Bernabéu; Referee: José Pérez Sánchez

16 March 1990 30	Athletic Bilbao	1–1	Real Madrid	Bilbao
	Mendiguren 70'	Report	Hugo Sánchez 13' (pen.)	Stadium: San Mamés; Referee: José Benavente Garasa

24 March 1990 31	Real Madrid	5–2	CD Tenerife	Madrid
	Hugo Sánchez 15'; Hierro 45'; Ruggeri 53'; Hugo Sánchez 73'; Martín Vázquez 75'	Report	Felipe 34'; Revert 51'	Stadium: Estadio Santiago Bernabéu; Referee: Angel Calvo Cordova

30 March 1990 32	Real Zaragoza	0–1	Real Madrid	Zaragoza
		Report	Aldana 77'	Stadium: Estadio La Romareda; Referee: Juan Peralta Ibáñez

7 April 1990 33	Real Madrid	3–0	Celta Vigo	Madrid
	Sanchis 37'; Míchel 73' (pen.); Losada 84'	Report		Stadium: Estadio Santiago Bernabéu; Referee: Jose Merino Gonzalez

14 April 1990 34	Real Valladolid	0–0	Real Madrid	Valladolid
		Report		Stadium: Estadio Jose Zorrilla

21 April 1990 35	Real Madrid	3–3	CD Logroñés	Madrid
	Hugo Sánchez 26'; Hugo Sánchez 54'; Losada 66'	Report	Manu Sarabia 8'; Santiago Aragón 10'; Pedro 60'	Stadium: Estadio Santiago Bernabéu

24 April 1990 36	CA Osasuna	0–2	Real Madrid	Pamplona
		Report	Martín Vázquez 30'; Martín Vázquez 78'	Stadium: Estadio El Sadar

27 April 1990 37	Atlético Madrid	3–3	Real Madrid	Madrid
	Baltazar 17'; Orejuela 28'; Manolo 40'	Report	36'Hierro; Losada 57'; Hierro 89'	Stadium: Estadio Vicente Calderón

4 May 1990 38	Real Madrid	5–2	Real Oviedo	Madrid
	Parra 15'; Hugo Sánchez 36'; Hugo Sánchez 46' (pen.); Hugo Sánchez 64'; Aldana 81'	Report	Vinyals 5'; Carlos 57' (pen.)	Stadium: Estadio Santiago Bernabéu

=== Copa del Rey ===
==== Round of 16 ====
7 November 1989	Atlético Madrid	0–0	Real Madrid	Madrid
				Stadium: Estadio Vicente Calderón

29 November 1989	Real Madrid	2–0 (2–0 agg.)	Atlético Madrid	Madrid
				Stadium: Estadio Santiago Bernabéu

==== Quarter-finals ====
9 January 1990	Real Madrid	3–0	Real Valladolid	Madrid
				Stadium: Estadio Santiago Bernabéu

22 January 1990	Real Valladolid	1–0 (3–1 agg.)	Real Madrid	Valladolid
				Stadium: Estadio Jose Zorrilla

==== Semi-finals ====
6 February 1990	Cádiz CF	0–1	Real Madrid	Cádiz
				Stadium: Estadio Ramon de Carranza

27 February 1990	Real Madrid	3–0 (4–0 agg.)	Cádiz CF	Madrid
				Stadium: Estadio Santiago Bernabéu

==== Final ====
5 April 1990	FC Barcelona	2–0	Real Madrid	Valencia
				Stadium: Estadio Mestalla

=== European Cup ===
==== First round ====
12 September 1989	Spora Luxembourg	0–3	(Spain) Real Madrid	Luxembourg
		Report

27 September 1989	Real Madrid (Spain)	6–0	Spora Luxembourg	Madrid
		Report		Stadium: Estadio Santiago Bernabéu

==== Round of 16 ====
18 October 1989	A.C. Milan (Italy)	2–0	(Spain) Real Madrid	Milan
		Report		Stadium: Stadio San Siro

31 October 1989	Real Madrid (Spain)	1–0 (1–2 agg.)	(Italy) A.C. Milan	Madrid
		Report		Stadium: Estadio Santiago Bernabéu

=== Supercopa ===
Awarded automatically to Real Madrid after they won the Double (League and Copa del Rey).

=== Friendlies ===
==== American Trip ====
14 May 1990 Friendly	CF Monterrey	2–0	Real Madrid	Monterrey
	Martelotto 22'; Barrera 75'			Stadium: Tecnologico

18 May 1990 San Jose Trophy	West Bromwich Albion	1–6	Real Madrid	San Jose
	McNally 92' (pen.)		22' Solana; 35' Parra; 37' Parra; 67' Sanchez; 68' Sanchez; 90' Aldana	Stadium: Spartan

20 May 1990 San Jose Trophy	1.FC Köln	0–1	Real Madrid	San Jose
			79' Aguilá	Stadium: Spartan

23 May 1990 Nations Cup	CONCACAF All stars	0–2	Real Madrid	Los Angeles
			23' Aldana; 78' Aguilá	Stadium: Memorial Coliseum; Referee: (United States) Arturo Angeles

24 May 1990 Nations Cup	Mexico	3–1	Real Madrid	Los Angeles
	Farfán 15'; Peláez 30'; Zague 64'		26' Sanchez	Stadium: Memorial Coliseum; Referee: (United States) Majid Jau

29 May 1990 Friendly	CD Toluca	1–3	Real Madrid	Toluca
	Graniolatti 87'		13' Maqueda; 60' Sanchez; 85' Aguilá	Stadium: La Bombonera; Referee: (Mexico) Refugio Ramirez

31 May 1990 Veracruz Trophy	Pumas UNAM	3–2	Real Madrid	Veracruz
	Vazquez; Garcia; Garcia		Aldana; Losada	Stadium: Luis Pirata Fuente

2 June 1990 Veracruz Trophy	CD Veracruz	4–2	Real Madrid	Veracruz
	Comas 15'; Omar Palma 52'; Rocha 54'; Rocha 75'		20'Losada; 60' Schuster	Stadium: Luis Pirata Fuente

== Statistics ==
=== Squad statistics ===
Competition	Points	Total						GD
Competition	Points	G	V	N	P	Gf	Gs	GD
La Liga	62	38	26	10	2	107	38	+69
Copa del Rey	–	7	4	1	2	9	3	+6
European Cup	–	4	3	0	1	10	2	+8
Total		49	33	11	5	126	43	+83

=== Players statistics ===
No.	Pos	Nat	Player	Total		La Liga		Copa del Rey		European Cup	
No.	Pos	Nat	Player	Apps	Goals	Apps	Goals	Apps	Goals	Apps	Goals
	GK	(Spain) ESP	Buyo	46	-38	35	-33	7	-3	4	-2
	DF	(Spain) ESP	Chendo	46	1	37	1	6	0	3	0
	DF	(Spain) ESP	Hierro	46	7	35+2	7	5	0	4	0
	DF	(Argentina) ARG	Oscar Ruggeri	39	3	31	2	5	1	3	0
	DF	(Spain) ESP	Sanchís	45	3	33+1	3	7	0	4	0
	MF	(Spain) ESP	Martin Vazquez	42	15	34	14	5	1	3	0
	MF	(Spain) ESP	Míchel	46	10	37	8	6	0	3	2
	MF	(West Germany) FRG	Schuster	36	6	28	6	6	0	2	0
	MF	(Spain) ESP	Gordillo	41	0	33	0	5	0	2+1	0
	FW	(Mexico) MEX	Hugo Sánchez	44	42	35	38	6	3	3	1
	FW	(Spain) ESP	Butragueño	40	14	32	10	6	2	2	2
	GK	(Spain) ESP	Agustín	3	-2	2	-2	0	0	0+1	0
	DF	(Spain) ESP	Solana	24	0	10+11	0	0+2	0	1	0
	MF	(Spain) ESP	Paco Llorente	31	2	2+21	1	1+3	1	2+2	0
	FW	(Spain) ESP	Sebastian Losada	23	9	8+8	8	2+2	1	2+1	0
	MF	(Spain) ESP	Adolfo Aldana	20	6	7+6	5	2+2	1	1+2	0
	GK	(Spain) ESP	Lopetegui	1	-3	1	-3	0	0		
	DF	(Spain) ESP	Julio Llorente	17	0	6+4	0	3+1	0	2+1	0
	MF	(Spain) ESP	Joaquin Parra	15	1	3+10	1	1+1	0		
	DF	(Spain) ESP	Algar								
	DF	(Spain) ESP	Tendillo	14	1	4+7	0	2	0	1	1
	FW	(Spain) ESP	Albert Aguilá	1	0	0+1	0				

- Source: https://www.bdfutbol.com/en/t/t1989-902.html

== See also ==
- La Quinta del Buitre
