= 1990 Copa del Rey final =

Copa del Rey 1990 final
- Event: 1989–90 Copa del Rey
Barcelona	Real Madrid
2	0
- Date: 5 April 1990
- Venue: Mestalla Stadium, Valencia
- Referee: Raúl García de Loza
- Attendance: 45,250

The 1990 Copa del Rey final was the 88th final of the King's Cup. The final was played at Mestalla Stadium in Valencia on 5 April 1990, and was won by Barcelona, who beat Real Madrid 2–0.

== Details ==
5 April 1990
20:00 CET

Barcelona	2–0	Real Madrid
Amor 68'; Salinas 90'	Report

Mestalla Stadium, Valencia
Attendance: 45,250
Referee: Raúl García de Loza

Barcelona
Real Madrid

GK	1	(Spain) Andoni Zubizarreta
RB	3	(Spain) José Ramón Alexanko (c)	(yellow card) 88'
CB	4	(Netherlands) Ronald Koeman	(yellow card) 61'
LB	2	(Brazil) Aloísio		(substituted off) 23'
RM	5	(Spain) Guillermo Amor	(yellow card) 6'	(substituted off) 70'
CM	6	(Spain) José Mari Bakero
CM	10	(Spain) Roberto
LM	8	(Spain) Eusebio
RF	9	(Denmark) Michael Laudrup
CF	7	(Spain) Julio Salinas	(yellow card) 51'
LF	11	(Spain) Txiki Begiristain
Substitutes:
CB	12	(Spain) Ricardo Serna		(substituted on) 23'
GK	13	(Spain) Juan Carlos Unzué
FW	14	(Spain) Ernesto Valverde
RB	15	(Spain) Luis López Rekarte
LB	16	(Spain) Miquel Soler		(substituted on) 70'
Manager:
(Netherlands) Johan Cruyff

GK	1	(Spain) Francisco Buyo
RB	2	(Spain) Chendo (c)
CB	6	(Argentina) Oscar Ruggeri
LB	5	(Spain) Manuel Sanchís
RM	10	(Spain) Rafael Martín Vázquez
CM	8	(Spain) Míchel	(yellow card) 3'	(substituted off) 75'
CM	4	(Spain) Fernando Hierro	(yellow card) 32' (yellow-red card) 45'
CM	11	(West Germany) Bernd Schuster
LM	3	(Spain) Rafael Gordillo
RF	7	(Spain) Emilio Butragueño		(substituted off) 63'
LF	9	(Mexico) Hugo Sánchez
Substitutes:
RM	12	(Spain) Adolfo Aldana		(substituted on) 75'
GK	13	(Spain) Agustín
CB	14	(Spain) Miguel Tendillo
RB	15	(Spain) Julio Llorente		(substituted on) 63'
LB	16	(Spain) Jesús Solana
Manager:
(Wales) John Benjamin Toshack

MATCH RULES

- 90 minutes.
- 30 minutes of extra-time if necessary.
- Penalty shoot-out if scores still level.
- Five named substitutes.
- Maximum of two substitutions.

== See also ==
- El Clásico
