= Nacho Conte =

Spanish footballer

Personal information
- Full name: Ignacio Conte Crespo
- Date of birth: 21 February 1969 (age 57)
- Place of birth: Zaragoza, Spain
- Height: 1.80 m (5 ft 11 in)
- Position: Midfielder

Youth career
- Betis

Senior career*
Years	Team	Apps	(Gls)
1986–1989	Betis B	59	(9)
1989–1993	Sevilla	114	(18)
1993–1997	Tenerife	88	(7)
1997–1998	Racing Santander	27	(0)
1998–2000	Hércules	47	(8)
2004–2005	Laguna	17	(1)
Total		352	(43)

International career
1984–1985	Spain U16	9	(4)
1990	Spain U21	2	(0)
1991	Spain	1	(0)
- * Club domestic league appearances and goals

Ignacio 'Nacho' Conte Crespo (born 21 February 1969) is a Spanish former professional footballer who played as a midfielder.

He achieved La Liga totals of 229 games and 25 goals over nine seasons, with Sevilla, Tenerife and Racing de Santander. He won one cap for Spain.

== Club career ==
=== Sevilla ===
Conte was born in Zaragoza, Aragon. He started out in Real Betis's academy, but local rivals Sevilla FC signed him in 1989 after the former's reserves suffered relegation from Segunda División B.

Conte made his La Liga debut for the club in the 1989–90 season, under manager Vicente Cantatore. He scored his first competitive goal on 20 September in a 4–1 home win against RCD Español in the Copa del Rey, adding six in the league to help his team to finish sixth and qualify for the UEFA Cup.

=== Tenerife ===
In summer 1993, Conte joined CD Tenerife. He was part of the squad that participated in the 1993–94 UEFA Cup – a first-ever for the Canarians – helping in their third-round run.

A starter in his first two years at the Estadio Heliodoro Rodríguez López, Conte was much less played after the arrival of new coach Jupp Heynckes.

=== Later career ===
Conte retired from professional football aged 31, after one season with Racing de Santander (top flight) and two with Hércules CF (both Segunda División and third tier).

== International career ==
Conte represented Spain at under-21 and full level. His only match for the latter was on 13 November 1991, when he came on as a 60th-minute substitute for Gabriel Moya in a meaningless 2–1 victory over Czechoslovakia for the UEFA Euro 1992 qualifiers.
