= Luis Merino =

Mexican/Canadian painter (born 1942)

- Born: 17 September 1942 (age 83); Mexico City, Mexico
- Education: Instituto Allende, Academy of San Carlos
- Movement: Cubism

Luis Merino (born September 17, 1942, in Mexico City, Mexico) is a Mexican/Canadian painter. His work can be found in numerous public and private collections in Canada, Mexico, and the United States. Some of his most notable work is on display in the Maltwood Art Museum and Gallery, at the University of Victoria in Greater Victoria, British Columbia, Canada.

== Biography ==
Luis Merino was born in Mexico City, Mexico in 1942. At an early age, Luis knew he wanted to be a painter. When he was 16, he studied at the prestigious Academy of San Carlos in Mexico City. During this time, Merino intensified his study in oil painting. Following visits to various museums and exhibits throughout the city, he developed an affinity for Mexican, American, and European modernism.

In 1968, Luis Merino attended the Instituto Allende in San Miguel de Allende, Guanajuato, Mexico. While in school, he was taught by American/Yugoslavian abstract painter James Pinto. In his final semester, Merino accepted Pinto's invitation to teach life-drawing at the institute.

Upon immigrating to Canada in 1970, Merino began to reveal influences of cubism in his paintings, which can still be seen in his work to this day.

In 1972, Merino moved to Victoria, British Columbia with his wife, Sandra, and became a prominent member of the arts community. Luis remained active in the community by painting murals inside of public buildings, displaying his art in local galleries, and regularly organizing exhibitions for fellow artists.

== Influences ==
Merino's earliest influences were from Mexican muralism in particular Diego Rivera. He also places an emphasis on "peaceable content" that resonates with the post-Mexican Revolution painters Pedro Coronel and Rufino Tamayo. Additionally, Luis cites the "humanism which had underlain much existential discourse in the 1960s" as a significant influence. Since the 1970s, Merino's work has been largely influenced by his affinity for the early, analytic cubism of Braque and Picasso. In the 1980s, he began to incorporate the "female form in expressions of sensuality, harmony, complexity and inner mystery", which has remained a consistent theme in most of his work to this day. In this regard Merino's work has parallels with that of Modigliani. This combination of abstraction from cubism with the figure results in a style of painting best described as Figurative Abstraction.

== Work ==
Currently, Luis Merino has a number of his paintings on display in the Maltwood Art Museum and Gallery at the University of Victoria in Greater Victoria, British Columbia, Canada. The most notable of these pieces are Bar Maids III (1990) and Frida (1990-1991).
