= Juan Antonio Pizzi =

Spanish football manager (born 1968)

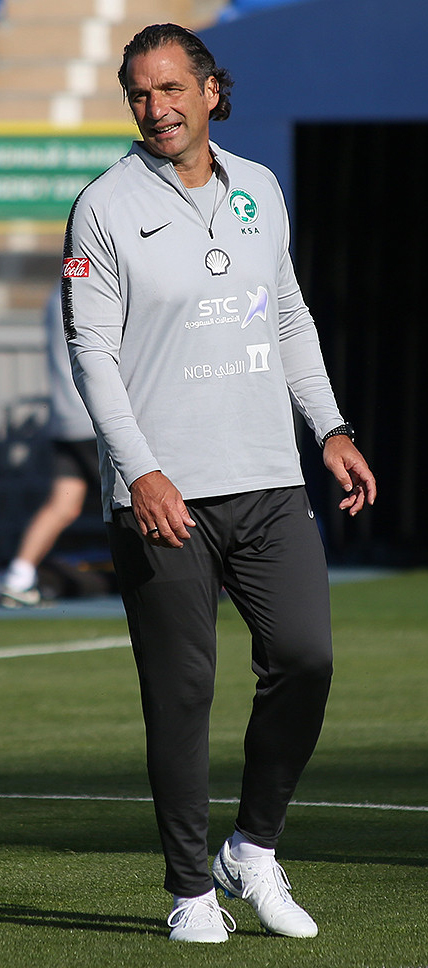
- Pizzi as Saudi Arabia manager at the 2018 World Cup

Personal information
- Full name: Juan Antonio Pizzi Torroja
- Date of birth: 7 June 1968 (age 58)
- Place of birth: Santa Fe, Argentina
- Height: 1.85 m (6 ft 1 in)
- Position: Striker

Youth career
- Rosario Central

Senior career*
Years	Team	Apps	(Gls)
1987–1990	Rosario Central	57	(27)
1990–1991	Toluca	30	(12)
1991–1993	Tenerife	68	(30)
1993–1994	Valencia	19	(4)
1994–1996	Tenerife	73	(46)
1996–1998	Barcelona	48	(11)
1998–1999	River Plate	17	(6)
1999–2000	Rosario Central	28	(19)
2000	Porto	11	(3)
2001–2002	Rosario Central	28	(11)
2002	→ Villarreal (loan)	13	(1)
Total		364	(160)

International career
1994–1998	Spain	22	(8)

Managerial career
- 2005: Colón Santa Fe
- 2006: Universidad San Martín
- 2009–2010: Santiago Morning
- 2010–2011: Universidad Católica
- 2011–2012: Rosario Central
- 2012–2013: San Lorenzo
- 2013–2014: Valencia
- 2014–2016: León
- 2016–2017: Chile
- 2017–2019: Saudi Arabia
- 2019: San Lorenzo
- 2021: Racing Club
- 2022–2023: Al Wasl
- 2023–2024: Bahrain
- 2024–2025: Kuwait
Medal record
Men's football
Representing Chile (as manager)
Copa América
Winner	2016
FIFA Confederations Cup
Runner-up	2017
- * Club domestic league appearances and goals

Juan Antonio Pizzi Torroja (Spanish pronunciation: [ˈxwan anˈtonjo ˈpisi], Italian: [ˈpittsi]; born 7 June 1968) is a football manager and former player who played as a striker.

Pizzi spent the bulk of his club career in Spain, mainly at Tenerife, helping to the side's consolidation in La Liga and amassing top division totals of 221 matches and 92 goals over eight seasons – he also played for Valencia and Barcelona.

Born in Argentina, Pizzi represented the Spain national team for four years, appearing with it in one World Cup and one European Championship. He embarked on a managerial career after retiring, winning the Copa América Centenario for Chile in 2016. He also coached Saudi Arabia at the World Cup in 2018 and Bahrain at the 2023 Asian Cup.

== Club career ==
Born in Santa Fe, Pizzi started his professional career with Rosario Central, before transferring to Mexico's Deportivo Toluca. After only one year, he moved to Tenerife, experiencing great individual success (a total of 30 goals in his first two seasons) while also helping the Canary Islands club to qualify for the UEFA Cup in his second year.

These performances prompted interest from fellow La Liga side Valencia, and Pizzi's subsequent purchase. However, highly unsettled, he returned at the end of the campaign to his previous team and in the second season in his second spell he fired them into another UEFA Cup qualification, topping the goal charts at 31 in 41 games and adding a further five in the Copa del Rey.

After that, Pizzi transferred to Barcelona. Never an undisputed starter, barred by Ronaldo, Sonny Anderson and the versatile Luis Enrique during his two-season stint, he managed to net 18 times in competitive matches, being very popular among the Camp Nou faithful.

With Barcelona, Pizzi won the Supercopa de España in 1996, the UEFA Super Cup and Spanish Cup in 1997, conquering the latter again the following year while also winning his only league title. Arguably, his most memorable moment was the decisive goal in the 5–4 home win over Atlético Madrid in the domestic cup's quarter-finals second leg, after the Blaugrana trailed 3–0 at half-time.

Subsequently, Pizzi returned to Argentina to play for River Plate, then had an unassuming spell in Portugal for Porto. After starting 2001–02 back with Rosario he signed with Villarreal for its closure, as the club had lost to a severe leg injury countryman Martín Palermo.

== International career ==
Pizzi earned 22 caps for Spain and scored eight goals, his debut coming on 30 November 1994 in a 2–0 friendly win against Finland. The following 20 September, he helped to beat his country of birth Argentina 2–1 in an exhibition game played in Madrid.

Pizzi was part of the squads for UEFA Euro 1996 and the 1998 FIFA World Cup. In the latter, after being replaced by Fernando Morientes in a 0–0 draw against Paraguay as Spain exited in the group stage, he retired from the international scene.

== Coaching career ==
=== Early career ===
After his retirement, aged almost 34, Pizzi played polo in the Barcelona region, then started his coaching career. Together with José del Solar, he managed Argentine Primera División's Colón at the beginning of the Clausura 2005, but both were sacked after three losses in the first three matches.

On 13 April 2006, Pizzi became the coach of Universidad San Martín in the Peruvian Primera División. He returned to his country of birth five years later, working with Rosario Central and San Lorenzo and winning the 2013 Inicial with the latter.

=== Valencia ===
On 26 December 2013, Pizzi returned to Valencia after 20 years, being appointed manager. His first game in charge was on 4 January of the following year, a 2–0 derby home win over Levante.

Pizzi was sacked on 2 July 2014, after new owner Peter Lim took over. It was the first time in 16 years that Valencia had failed to qualify for Europe, after an eighth-place finish.

=== Chile ===
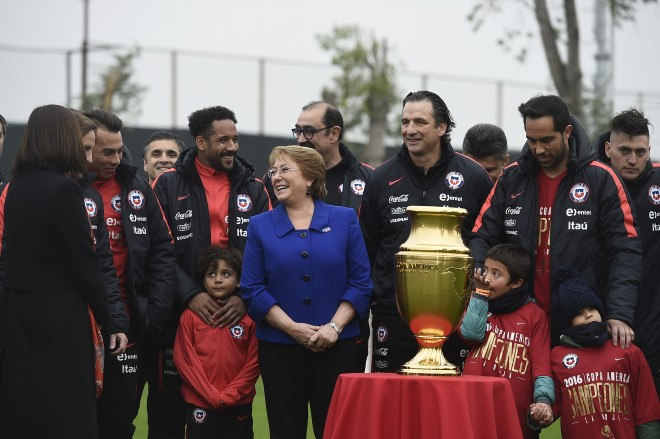
Pizzi and his Chile squad meeting President Michelle Bachelet after winning the Copa América Centenario

On 29 January 2016, after one year at the helm of León in the Liga MX, Pizzi replaced Jorge Sampaoli at the Chile national side. He took the nation to victory in the Copa América Centenario in the United States, notably disposing of Mexico 7–0 in the last-eight stage and defeating Argentina on penalties in the decisive match.

Pizzi took the team to the final of the 2017 FIFA Confederations Cup, Chile's first ever final in a FIFA competition and the fifth South American country to do so, losing 0–1 to Germany. However, after failing to qualify for the next year's World Cup – they reached the last matchday in third place, falling to sixth following the 3–0 away loss against Brazil – he resigned.

=== Saudi Arabia ===
On 28 November 2017, Pizzi was appointed to manage Saudi Arabia, becoming the third man to hold the position in as many months. The team's run at the 2018 World Cup ended after the first three games (one win and two losses); On 21 January 2019, after round-of-16 elimination at the AFC Asian Cup and not having been approached by the Saudi Arabian Football Federation regarding the renewal of his contract, he resigned.

=== Later career ===
Pizzi returned to San Lorenzo in June 2019, six years after his first managerial spell. On 31 October, he was dismissed due to poor results.

On 21 January 2021, Pizzi was appointed at Racing Club. His team lost the Supercopa Argentina 5–0 to River in March and the Copa de la Superliga final to Colón. He was removed by club president Víctor Blanco on 9 August after a 1–0 defeat to city rivals Independiente.

On 29 June 2022, Pizzi signed a one-year contract at Al-Wasl of the UAE Pro League. Having finished fifth in his only season, he returned to international management with Bahrain. At the 2023 AFC Asian Cup in Qatar, his team finished their group ahead of South Korea before being eliminated by Japan in the last 16. He left by mutual consent on 16 February 2024, seven months into a two-year deal.

Remaining in the Middle East, Pizzi was hired on 16 July 2024 as manager of Kuwait. He succeeded Rui Bento, with the team in the third round of World Cup qualifiers for the first time in 20 years. With 1 win in 15 matches, news was distributed that Pizzi left work without informing the federation and stayed out of contact. The Federation announced they are looking for a new Replacement on April 1 and later revealed that he’d leave after his contract expired at the end of the qualifiers.

== Career statistics ==
=== Club ===
Appearances and goals by club, season and competition
Club	Season	League			National cup (Note: Includes Copa México, Copa del Rey, Supercopa de España and Taça de Portugal.)		Continental		Other (Note: Liguilla Pre-Libertadores of Argentina (1987–90).)		Total	
Club	Season	Division	Apps	Goals	Apps	Goals	Apps	Goals	Apps	Goals	Apps	Goals
Rosario Central	1987–88	Argentine Primera División	–		–		–		2	0	2	0
Rosario Central	1988–89	Argentine Primera División	26	12	—		—		2	1	28	13
Rosario Central	1989–90	Argentine Primera División	31	15	—		—		2	2	33	17
Rosario Central	Total		57	27	0	0	0	0	6	3	63	30
Toluca	1990–91	Mexican Primera División	31	12	2	2	—		—		33	14
Tenerife	1991–92	La Liga	34	15	6	5	—		—		40	20
Tenerife	1992–93	La Liga	34	15	4	3	—		—		38	18
Tenerife	Total		68	30	10	8	0	0	0	0	78	38
Valencia	1993–94	La Liga	19	4	1	0	1 (Note: Appearances in UEFA Cup)	0	—		21	4
Tenerife	1994–95	La Liga	32	15	1	0	—		—		33	15
Tenerife	1995–96	La Liga	41	31	7	5	—		—		48	36
Tenerife	Tenerife total		141	76	18	13	0	0	0	0	159	89
Barcelona	1996–97	La Liga	33	9	9	6	7 (Note: Appearances in UEFA Cup Winners' Cup)	1	—		49	16
Barcelona	1997–98	La Liga	15	2	4	0	4 (Note: Appearances in UEFA Champions League)	0	—		23	2
Barcelona	Total		48	11	13	6	11	1	0	0	72	18
River Plate	1997–98	Argentine Primera División	—		—		2 (Note: Copa Libertadores)	0	—		2	0
River Plate	1998–99	Argentine Primera División	17	6	—		16	5	—		33	11
River Plate	Total		17	6	0	0	18	5	0	0	35	11
Rosario Central	1999–2000	Argentine Primera División	28	18	—		8 (Note: Copa Mercosur)	6	—		36	24
Porto	2000–01	Primeira Liga	11	3	1	1	4	0	—		16	4
Rosario Central	2000–01	Argentine Primera División	10	4	—		10	7	—		20	11
Rosario Central	2001–02	Argentine Primera División	18	7	—		—		—		18	7
Rosario Central	Rosario Central total		113	56	0	0	18	13	6	3	137	72
Villarreal (loan)	2001–02	La Liga	13	1	2	0	—		—		15	1
Career total			393	169	36	22	52	19	6	3	487	213

=== International ===
Appearances and goals by national team and year
National team	Year	Apps	Goals
Spain	1994	1	0
Spain	1995	8	4
Spain	1996	7	1
Spain	1997	3	1
Spain	1998	3	2
Total		22	8

Scores and results list Spain's goal tally first, score column indicates score after each Pizzi goal.

List of international goals scored by Juan Antonio Pizzi
No.	Date	Venue	Opponent	Score	Result	Competition
1	18 January 1995	Riazor, A Coruña, Spain	Uruguay	1–0	2–2	Friendly
2	6 September 1995	Los Cármenes, Granada, Spain	Cyprus	3–0	6–0	UEFA Euro 1996 qualifying
3	6 September 1995	Los Cármenes, Granada, Spain	Cyprus	5–0	6–0	UEFA Euro 1996 qualifying
4	20 September 1995	Vicente Calderón, Madrid, Spain	Argentina	1–0	2–1	Friendly
5	13 November 1996	Heliodoro Rodríguez, Tenerife, Spain	Slovakia	1–0	4–1	1998 FIFA World Cup qualification
6	12 February 1997	Rico Pérez, Alicante, Spain	Malta	4–0	4–0	1998 FIFA World Cup qualification
7	3 June 1998	El Sardinero, Santander, Spain	Northern Ireland	1–0	4–1	Friendly
8	3 June 1998	El Sardinero, Santander, Spain	Northern Ireland	2–0	4–1	Friendly

== Managerial statistics ==
As of match played 10 June 2025

Managerial record by team and tenure
Team	Nat	From	To	Record							
Team	Nat	From	To	G	W	D	L	GF	GA	GD	Win %
Colón Santa Fe	(Argentina)	5 February 2005	26 February 2005	3	0	0	3	3	8	−5	0.00
Universidad San Martín	(Peru)	18 April 2006	27 November 2006	33	13	8	12	36	38	−2	39.39
Santiago Morning	(Chile)	1 July 2009	24 June 2010	44	16	9	19	60	75	−15	36.36
Universidad Católica	(Chile)	8 July 2010	30 June 2011	56	37	10	9	120	67	+53	66.07
Rosario Central	(Argentina)	1 July 2011	5 July 2012	44	22	13	9	54	36	+18	50.00
San Lorenzo	(Argentina)	9 October 2012	26 December 2013	54	23	21	10	75	47	+28	42.59
Valencia	(Spain)	26 December 2013	2 July 2014	32	12	11	9	43	32	+11	37.50
León	(Mexico)	4 December 2014	29 January 2016	51	25	6	20	97	88	+9	49.02
Chile	(Chile)	29 January 2016	10 October 2017	32	13	7	12	48	36	+12	40.63
Saudi Arabia	(Saudi Arabia)	28 November 2017	21 January 2019	20	6	4	10	21	30	−9	30.00
San Lorenzo	(Argentina)	1 July 2019	31 October 2019	13	5	2	6	15	20	−5	38.46
Racing Club	(Argentina)	21 January 2021	9 August 2021	32	13	11	8	33	30	+3	40.63
Al Wasl	(United Arab Emirates)	1 July 2022	16 May 2023	33	17	9	7	62	40	+22	51.52
Bahrain	(Bahrain)	12 July 2023	15 February 2024	11	5	1	5	10	14	−4	45.45
Kuwait	(Kuwait)	16 July 2024	31 July 2025	17	1	8	8	13	29	−16	5.88
Career total				475	208	120	147	690	590	+100	43.79

== Honours ==
=== Player ===
Barcelona

- La Liga: 1997–98
- Copa del Rey: 1996–97, 1997–98
- Supercopa de España: 1996
- UEFA Cup Winners' Cup: 1996–97
- UEFA Super Cup: 1997

Porto

- Taça de Portugal: 2000–01

Individual

- Pichichi Trophy: 1995–96

=== Manager ===
Universidad Católica

- Chilean Primera División: 2010

San Lorenzo

- Argentine Primera División: 2013 Inicial

Chile

- Copa América: 2016

Individual

- La Liga Manager of the Month: February 2014

== See also ==
- List of Spain international footballers born outside Spain
