= Antonio Pinilla =

Spanish retired footballer (born 1971)

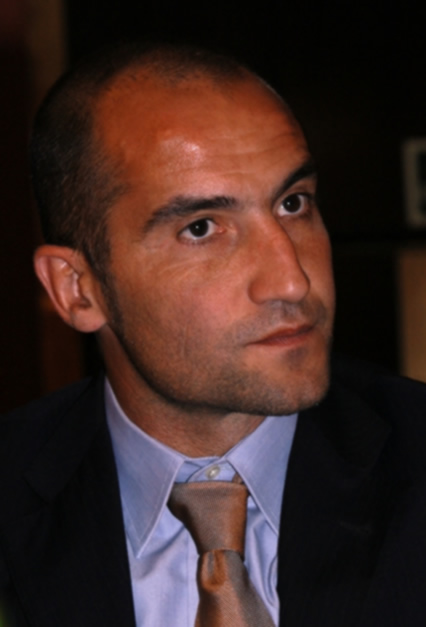
- Pinilla in 2008

Personal information
- Full name: Antonio Pinilla Miranda
- Date of birth: 25 February 1971 (age 55)
- Place of birth: Badalona, Spain
- Height: 1.76 m (5 ft 9 in)
- Position: Forward

Youth career
- Sant Gabriel
- 1986–1988: Barcelona

Senior career*
Years	Team	Apps	(Gls)
1988	Barcelona C	1	(1)
1988–1991	Barcelona B	90	(34)
1990–1993	Barcelona	8	(1)
1991–1992	→ Mallorca (loan)	21	(4)
1992–1993	→ Albacete (loan)	36	(8)
1993–2000	Tenerife	184	(30)
2000–2001	Salamanca	34	(4)
2001–2008	Gimnàstic	196	(33)
Total		570	(115)

International career
1987	Spain U16	5	(5)
1987	Spain U17	1	(0)
1987–1988	Spain U18	8	(2)
1988–1989	Spain U19	3	(0)
1989–1990	Spain U20	5	(2)
1990–1991	Spain U21	5	(1)
1991–1992	Spain U23	8	(1)
Medal record
Representing Spain
Men's Football
Gold medal – first place	1992 Barcelona	Team competition
- * Club domestic league appearances and goals

Antonio Pinilla Miranda (born 25 February 1971) is a Spanish former professional footballer who played mainly as a forward.

Best known for his stints at Tenerife and Gimnàstic – he began playing with Barcelona, but had virtually no impact for its first team – he also served as general manager at the latter club, appearing in 511 official matches for seven teams in two decades, 242 of those in La Liga over 11 seasons (40 goals scored).

== Club career ==
=== Barcelona ===
Born in Badalona, Barcelona, Catalonia, Pinilla was brought up at FC Barcelona. During the 1989–90 season, a week before turning 19, Johan Cruyff handed him his La Liga debut on 18 February 1990 in a match against Rayo Vallecano; he featured 25 minutes in the 4–1 away win, having come on as a substitute for Julio Salinas.

The following campaign, Barcelona won the league and Pinilla appeared in seven matches, scoring an important goal against Valencia CF. He also played in the final of the UEFA Cup Winners' Cup, subbing in for veteran José Ramón Alexanko in a 2–1 loss to Manchester United.

However, strong competition in the emerging Dream Team meant Pinilla had to leave Barça on loan, and he joined RCD Mallorca, in a season that ended in top-division relegation. For 1992–93, he signed with top-flight newcomers Albacete Balompié, only missing two games and scoring eight goals as the Castilla–La Mancha club retained its league status.

=== Tenerife and Gimnàstic ===
Pinilla was finally released in the summer of 1993, signing for CD Tenerife where he remained seven seasons, helping the Canary Islands team to reach the semi-finals of the 1996–97 UEFA Cup; he previously entered the club's history books when scoring its first goal ever in European competition, against AJ Auxerre on 15 September 1993. 1998–99 brought with it relegation, and the player followed the side into Segunda División.

After one season with UD Salamanca, also in the second tier, Pinilla joined Gimnàstic de Tarragona, recently promoted to that league. His seven goals, however, proved insufficient to prevent them from being immediately relegated; in addition, a serious knee injury in the final months of the campaign forced him into the operating room which led two a six-month period of inactivity, in turn prompting his release.

Having returned to fitness on his own, Pinilla rejoined Gimnàstic in the 2003 winter transfer window. Although he barely managed to make the squad while they were in the Segunda División B, he became an important unit in their return to division two, adding five goals in the last ten days of 2005–06 in an historic return to the top flight.

Pinilla served as captain during Gimnàstic's short-lived spell in the main division, netting twice from 28 appearances for the last-ranked team, against RCD Espanyol (4–0 at home) and at Athletic Bilbao (2–0). On 11 September 2007, the club was crowned champion of the Catalonia Cup for the first time after a 2–1 defeat of Barcelona, with him equalising the score.

At the end of the 2007–08 season, after helping Nàstic retain their second-tier status, Pinilla announced his retirement having totalled 221 competitive games with the club, immediately being named its general manager and leaving the post in early February 2010.

== International career ==
Pinilla never earned one full cap for Spain, but did represent the nation at various youth levels. Additionally, he was a member of the squad that won the gold medal at the 1992 Summer Olympics, appearing in two of six games.

Pinilla also played seven matches with the unofficial Catalonia national team.

== Honours ==
Barcelona

- La Liga: 1990–91
- Supercopa de España: 1991
- UEFA Cup Winners' Cup runner-up: 1990–91

Gimnàstic

- Copa Catalunya: 2007

Spain U23

- Summer Olympic Games: 1992
