= 1989–90 La Liga =

59th season of La Liga

La Liga
- Season: 1989–90
- Dates: 2 September 1989 – 6 May 1990
- Champions: Real Madrid; 25th title
- Relegated: CD Málaga; Celta; Rayo Vallecano
- European Cup: Real Madrid
- UEFA Cup: Valencia; Atlético Madrid; Real Sociedad; Sevilla
- Cup Winners' Cup: Barcelona
- Matches: 380
- Goals: 921 (2.42 per match)
- Top goalscorer: Hugo Sánchez (38 goals)

The 59th season of La Liga began on 2 September 1989 and concluded on 6 May 1990. Real Madrid finished the season as champions for the fifth season running.

== Team information ==
=== Clubs and locations ===
Location of teams in La Liga 1989–90
Canary Islands

Team	Home city	Stadium
Athletic Bilbao	Bilbao	San Mamés
Atlético Madrid	Madrid	Vicente Calderón
Barcelona	Barcelona	Nou Camp
Cádiz	Cádiz	Ramón de Carranza
Castellón	Castellón de la Plana	Castalia
Celta Vigo	Vigo	Balaídos
Logroñés	Logroño	Las Gaunas
Málaga	Málaga	La Rosaleda
Mallorca	Palma	Lluís Sitjar
Osasuna	Pamplona	El Sadar
Oviedo	Oviedo	Carlos Tartiere
Rayo Vallecano	Madrid	Vallecas
Real Madrid	Madrid	Santiago Bernabéu
Real Sociedad	San Sebastián	Atocha
Sevilla	Seville	Ramón Sánchez Pizjuán
Sporting Gijón	Gijón	El Molinón
Tenerife	Santa Cruz de Tenerife	Heliodoro Rodríguez López
Valencia	Valencia	Luis Casanova
Valladolid	Valladolid	José Zorrilla
Zaragoza	Zaragoza	La Romareda

== League table ==
Pos	Team	Pld	W	D	L	GF	GA	GD	Pts	Qualification or relegation
1	Real Madrid (C)	38	26	10	2	107	38	+69	62	Qualification for the European Cup first round
2	Valencia	38	20	13	5	67	42	+25	53	Qualification for the UEFA Cup first round
3	Barcelona	38	23	5	10	83	39	+44	51	Qualification for the Cup Winners' Cup first round (Note: Barcelona qualified for the European Cup Winners' Cup as champions of the Copa del Rey.)
4	Atlético Madrid	38	20	10	8	55	35	+20	50	Qualification for the UEFA Cup first round
5	Real Sociedad	38	15	14	9	43	35	+8	44	Qualification for the UEFA Cup first round
6	Sevilla	38	18	7	13	64	46	+18	43	Qualification for the UEFA Cup first round
7	Logroñés	38	18	5	15	47	51	−4	41	
8	Osasuna	38	14	12	12	42	42	0	40	
9	Zaragoza	38	16	8	14	52	52	0	40	
10	Mallorca	38	11	17	10	36	34	+2	39	
11	Oviedo	38	12	15	11	41	46	−5	39	
12	Athletic Bilbao	38	11	15	12	37	39	−2	37	
13	Sporting Gijón	38	12	10	16	37	34	+3	34	
14	Castellón	38	9	14	15	30	48	−18	32	
15	Cádiz	38	12	6	20	28	63	−35	30	
16	Valladolid	38	8	14	16	31	41	−10	30	
17	Málaga (R)	38	9	10	19	23	50	−27	28	Qualification for the relegation playoffs
18	Tenerife (O)	38	8	10	20	42	60	−18	26	Qualification for the relegation playoffs
19	Celta Vigo (R)	38	5	12	21	24	51	−27	22	Relegation to the Segunda División
20	Rayo Vallecano (R)	38	6	7	25	32	75	−43	19	Relegation to the Segunda División

Source: BDFútbol
Rules for classification: 1) Points; 2) Head-to-head results; 3) Goal difference; 4) Number of goals scored
(C) Champions; (O) Play-off winners; (R) Relegated

== Relegation playoff ==
Team 1	Agg.	Team 2	1st leg	2nd leg
Tenerife	1–0	Deportivo La Coruña	0–0	1–0
Español	1–1 (6–5 p)	Málaga	1–0	0–1

=== First leg ===
2 June 1990	CD Tenerife	0–0	Deportivo La Coruña	Santa Cruz de Tenerife
18:00		Report (in Spanish)		Stadium: Heliodoro Rodríguez López; Attendance: 22,000; Referee: Joaquín Ramos Marco (Castile and León)

2 June 1990	RCD Español	1–0	CD Málaga	Barcelona
20:00	Gabino 76'	Report (in Spanish)		Stadium: Sarrià; Attendance: 37,000; Referee: Raúl García de Loza (Galicia (Spain))

=== Second leg ===
10 June 1990	Deportivo La Coruña	0–1 (0–1 agg.)	CD Tenerife	A Coruña
19:00		Report (in Spanish)	Eduardo 13'	Stadium: Riazor; Attendance: 35,000; Referee: José María Enríquez Negreira (Catalonia)

10 June 1990	CD Málaga	1–0 (a.e.t.) (1–1 agg.) (5–6 p)	RCD Español	Málaga
19:00	Rivas 47'	Report & Report (in Spanish)		Stadium: La Rosaleda; Attendance: 45,000; Referee: Joaquín Urío Velázquez (Basque Country (autonomous community))
	Penalties
	Antonio Mata (penalty scored); Usuriaga (penalty scored); Rivas (penalty missed); Paquito (penalty scored); Jaro (penalty missed); Matosas (penalty scored); Merino (penalty scored); Villa (penalty missed)		(penalty missed) Zubillaga; (penalty scored) Gay; (penalty scored) Escaich; (penalty missed) Andrés; (penalty scored) Wuttke; (penalty scored) Maestre; (penalty scored) Martín; (penalty scored) Albesa

== Results ==
Home \ Away	ATH	ATM	FCB	CÁD	CAS	CEL	LOG	MCF	MLL	OSA	RVA	RMA	ROV	RSO	SFC	RSG	TEN	VCF	VLD	ZAR
Athletic Bilbao		1–1	1–2	3–1	2–1	2–0	1–0	3–0	0–0	1–1	3–2	1–1	0–0	1–0	1–1	1–0	1–1	1–1	2–2	2–0
Atlético Madrid	2–0		1–0	1–0	4–1	2–1	3–1	2–0	2–0	0–1	2–0	3–3	1–1	0–0	1–0	3–1	2–0	1–1	1–0	2–1
Barcelona	4–2	0–2		5–0	2–0	6–0	4–2	1–0	1–1	4–0	7–1	3–1	0–0	2–2	3–4	2–0	3–0	2–1	1–0	3–1
Cádiz	1–0	0–1	0–4		1–0	1–0	0–1	0–2	1–1	0–0	3–1	0–3	1–0	1–0	0–4	2–0	1–0	0–2	1–0	1–1
Castellón	1–0	0–0	1–0	1–1		1–0	0–0	1–1	1–2	1–2	1–0	0–0	1–1	0–2	3–1	1–0	0–0	0–1	1–1	2–1
Celta de Vigo	0–0	2–0	1–2	5–1	1–0		0–1	1–1	2–2	1–1	0–0	0–0	0–1	0–0	0–1	0–0	1–0	1–2	0–0	2–2
Logroñés	1–0	0–2	1–2	1–1	1–0	4–1		1–0	0–1	1–1	2–0	1–5	1–1	1–0	2–1	1–0	4–1	1–0	1–0	2–1
Málaga	0–1	0–0	0–1	1–0	1–1	1–1	0–2		0–2	1–1	1–0	1–2	1–0	0–2	2–1	1–0	2–1	1–1	0–1	0–3
Mallorca	1–0	0–0	1–0	5–1	1–1	2–0	3–1	2–0		2–2	1–0	0–0	2–2	0–0	1–1	1–1	0–2	0–1	1–1	0–1
Osasuna	1–1	2–1	0–3	1–0	1–2	1–0	3–0	2–0	1–0		2–1	0–2	4–0	1–1	2–1	0–1	3–0	2–2	1–0	2–0
Rayo Vallecano	0–0	4–4	1–4	0–1	0–2	2–0	0–2	1–0	0–0	1–0		1–2	1–1	0–3	2–1	1–2	1–0	2–2	2–1	2–2
Real Madrid	4–0	3–1	3–2	4–1	7–0	3–0	3–3	4–0	1–1	4–1	5–2		5–2	3–0	5–2	2–0	5–2	6–2	4–0	7–2
Oviedo	1–0	3–0	2–0	4–3	1–1	1–0	0–4	0–0	0–2	2–0	3–2	0–1		5–0	0–3	1–0	2–1	0–0	0–0	2–2
Real Sociedad	0–0	0–0	2–2	2–0	2–0	1–0	1–0	1–1	2–0	1–0	4–1	2–1	1–1		2–1	1–2	1–0	2–2	1–1	2–1
Sevilla	3–2	2–1	1–1	1–1	3–2	2–1	3–1	3–1	3–0	1–1	4–0	1–2	1–2	0–1		1–0	1–0	4–0	0–0	4–0
Sporting Gijón	0–1	2–1	0–2	4–0	0–0	3–0	5–1	0–1	3–0	0–0	1–0	1–1	0–0	0–0	0–1		1–0	1–1	3–0	1–1
Tenerife	1–1	2–3	1–4	0–1	3–0	2–1	3–1	2–2	1–1	2–0	1–0	2–3	2–1	2–2	1–2	1–1		1–1	0–0	1–2
Valencia	1–1	1–3	2–1	3–0	2–2	2–0	4–0	3–0	1–0	3–1	4–1	1–1	3–0	3–1	1–1	2–0	2–1		4–3	2–1
Valladolid	3–1	2–0	2–0	1–2	0–0	0–1	0–1	0–1	0–0	1–1	1–0	0–0	1–1	1–0	3–0	1–3	1–2	0–2		2–1
Zaragoza	1–0	0–2	2–0	1–0	3–1	1–1	1–0	3–0	1–0	1–0	3–0	0–1	2–0	2–1	1–0	2–1	3–3	0–1	2–2	

Updated to match(es) played on unknown. Source: LFP (in Spanish)
Legend: Blue = home team win; Yellow = draw; Red = away team win.

== Top goalscorers ==
Rank	Player	Club	Goals
1	(Mexico) Hugo Sánchez	Real Madrid	38
2	(Austria) Toni Polster	Sevilla	33
3	(Brazil) Baltazar	Atlético Madrid	18
4	(Republic of Ireland) John Aldridge	Real Sociedad	16
5	(Spain) Miguel Pardeza	Zaragoza	15
5	(Spain) Julio Salinas	Barcelona	15
7	(Spain) Carlos	Oviedo	14
7	(Netherlands) Ronald Koeman	Barcelona	14
7	(Spain) Rafael Martín Vázquez	Real Madrid	14
