= Míchel =

In Spain, Míchel (stressed on the first syllable) is a common nickname for Miguel, particularly frequent in footballers. Spanish footballers known as Míchel include:

- Míchel (footballer, born 1963), real name José Miguel González Martín del Campo, former Spanish football midfielder and coach, and allegedly the one who popularized the nickname
- Míchel (footballer, born 1975), real name Miguel Ángel Sánchez Muñoz, Spanish former football midfielder
- Míchel (footballer, born August 1977), real name Miguel Ángel Carrilero, Spanish former football forward
- Míchel (footballer, born 1985), real name Miguel Marcos Madera, Spanish football midfielder
- Míchel (footballer, born 1988), Miguel Alfonso Herrero, Spanish football midfielder
- Michel (footballer, born 2001), Michel Costa da Silva, Brazilian football midfielder
- Míchel Salgado (born 1975), real name Miguel Ángel Salgado Fernández, Spanish former football defender
- Míchel Zabaco (born 1989), real name Miguel Zabaco Tomé, Spanish football defender
- Carlos Michel Lopes Vargas (born 1982), known as just Michel, Brazilian footballer
