= Alexis (footballer, born 1974) =

Spanish footballer

Personal information
- Full name: José Alejandro Suárez Martín
- Date of birth: 6 March 1974 (age 52)
- Place of birth: Las Palmas, Spain
- Height: 1.82 m (5 ft 11 1/2 in)
- Position: Centre-back

Youth career
- Las Palmas

Senior career*
Years	Team	Apps	(Gls)
1991–1995	Las Palmas	61	(1)
1995–2003	Tenerife	163	(8)
2003–2007	Levante	129	(8)
2007–2008	Valladolid	11	(0)
Total		364	(17)
- * Club domestic league appearances and goals

José Alejandro Suárez Martín (born 6 March 1974), known as Alexis, is a Spanish former professional footballer who played mainly as a central defender.

He amassed La Liga totals of 195 matches and seven goals over eight seasons, representing in the competition Tenerife, Levante and Valladolid.

== Club career ==
Born in Las Palmas, Canary Islands, Alexis started playing professionally with his hometown club UD Las Palmas, by then in the Segunda División B. Subsequently, he joined neighbours CD Tenerife, making his La Liga debut in the 1995–96 season as they finished in fifth position.

After Tenerife's second top-tier relegation in four years in 2002, Alexis played one further season with them before signing for Levante UD, being instrumental in the Valencia side's 2004 promotion. Following another promotion and relegation with the latter, he scored a rare goal in 2006–07 in a 1–0 away win against Recreativo de Huelva on 17 September 2006, being an undisputed first-choice throughout the campaign (33 starts in 34 appearances, 2,979 minutes).

Alexis moved to Real Valladolid in the summer of 2007, appearing sparingly throughout the season and being released in October of the following year alongside his teammate Cifu despite still having a contract running.

== Honours ==
Levante

- Segunda División: 2003–04
