= Ángel Vivar Dorado =

Spanish footballer (born 1974)

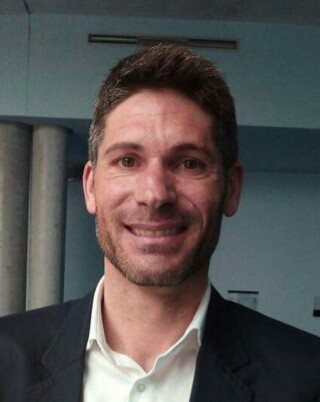
- Vivar Dorado in 2015

Personal information
- Full name: Ángel Manuel Vivar Dorado
- Date of birth: 12 February 1974 (age 52)
- Place of birth: Madrid, Spain
- Height: 1.80 m (5 ft 11 in)
- Position: Attacking midfielder

Team information
- Current team: Alcalá (manager)

Youth career
- 1985–1992: Leganés

Senior career*
| Years | Team | Apps | (Gls) |
| 1992–1994 | Leganés | 60 | (14) |
| 1994–1998 | Tenerife | 84 | (6) |
| 1998–2001 | Racing Santander | 86 | (7) |
| 2002 | Rayo Vallecano | 15 | (0) |
| 2002–2007 | Getafe | 150 | (18) |
| 2007–2009 | Valladolid | 53 | (5) |
| 2009–2010 | Albacete | 0 | (0) |
| Total | | 448 | (50) |

Managerial career
- 2024–: Alcalá
- * Club domestic league appearances and goals

Ángel Manuel Vivar Dorado (born 12 February 1974) is a Spanish former footballer who played mainly as an attacking midfielder. He is currently manager of Segunda Federación club Alcalá.

In an 18-year professional career, he represented mainly Getafe (five seasons), Tenerife and Racing de Santander (four apiece), appearing in 423 games and scoring 46 goals across both major levels of Spanish football – 296 matches and 23 goals in La Liga alone.

== Playing career ==
=== Leganés ===
Born in Madrid, Vivar Dorado began his career at local CD Leganés in the Segunda División B. At the end of the 1992–93 season, the 19-year-old achieved promotion to Segunda División, a first-ever for the club.

Vivar Dorado scored a career-best ten goals in the following campaign, as they managed to stay up.

=== Tenerife ===
For 1994–95, Vivar Dorado signed with CD Tenerife of La Liga. He featured rarely under Vicente Cantatore, but became a very important player for the next manager, Jupp Heynckes.

Vivar Dorado was part of the squad that reached the semi-finals of the 1996–97 UEFA Cup. He scored in both legs of the first round against Maccabi Tel Aviv FC, but was also sent off by David Elleray in the first match of the last-four tie, a 1–0 win over FC Schalke 04.

=== Later career ===
Vivar Dorado moved to Racing de Santander in summer 1998 and, despite a top-division relegation in his third year, stayed with the side before joining Rayo Vallecano of the same league in January 2002. This was to be another short spell, as he returned to the second tier with Getafe CF in August, helping the Madrid-based team attain a first ever promotion to the top flight in 2004 and going on to make 161 competitive appearances during his tenure before switching to Real Valladolid in July 2007; previously, on 10 May, he was one of three players on target in a 4–0 home victory against FC Barcelona in the semi-finals of the Copa del Rey, the 6–5 aggregate score meaning qualification for the final for the first time ever.

On 6 January 2008, Vivar Dorado scored twice as Valladolid emerged victorious 3–0 at his former employers Getafe. He automatically earned a one-year extension after playing the minimum games required, being released at the end of the 2008–09 season at age 35 and quickly agreeing a move to Albacete Balompié in the second division; however, he arrived injured and, after no official matches for the Castilla–La Mancha club, was released from contract in January 2010 due to an Achilles tendon injury, retiring shortly after.

== Coaching career ==
Vivar Dorado started working as a manager with AD Alcorcón and Leganés' youth sides. On 17 June 2024, he was named head coach of Tercera Federación club RSD Alcalá, promising he would leave at the end of the season if promotion was not achieved; it was, as champions.
