= César Gómez =

Spanish footballer (born 1967)

Personal information
- Full name: César Gómez del Rey
- Date of birth: 23 October 1967 (age 59)
- Place of birth: Madrid, Spain
- Height: 1.83 m (6 ft 0 in)
- Position: Centre back

Youth career
- Real Madrid

Senior career*
Years	Team	Apps	(Gls)
1984–1990	Castilla	65	(1)
1990–1992	Valladolid	53	(2)
1992–1997	Tenerife	164	(3)
1997–2001	Roma	3	(0)
Total		285	(6)
- * Club domestic league appearances and goals

César Gómez del Rey (born 23 October 1967) is a Spanish former footballer who played as a central defender.

He was best known for being part of the Tenerife sides that consolidated in La Liga into consecutive UEFA Cup presences. Over the course of seven seasons, he amassed totals in the former competition of 217 games and five goals, also representing Valladolid.

== Football career ==
Gómez was born in Madrid. He unsuccessfully graduated from Real Madrid's youth system, and made his professional debuts in 1990 with Real Valladolid, being relegated from La Liga in his second year.

Gómez joined fellow league team CD Tenerife in summer 1992, being instrumental as they qualified for the UEFA Cup in his debut campaign. Moreover, he played in the last league round against his alma mater, as Tenerife won and the Merengues lost the national title for the second consecutive year against the same team.

In 1997, after roughly 200 overall appearances for the Canarians, Gómez was signed by Serie A club A.S. Roma on a lucrative four-year contract, arriving at the same time as compatriot Iván Helguera. However, he only played a total of 87 minutes in his first season, including a lone start in a Derby della Capitale 1–3 defeat to 10-man S.S. Lazio; he was successively removed from the first team following his refusal for a release by mutual consent, and spent the following three years without appearing in a single match.

Gómez retired in 2001 after his contract expired, but stayed in the city, where he had opened a car shop in the EUR neighbourhood in the meantime. It was then revealed he had been signed by Roma following a mistake from the club directors, who actually were interested in fellow Tenerife defender Pablo Paz.
