= Marcelo Ojeda =

Argentine footballer

Personal information
- Full name: Marcelo Leonardo Ojeda
- Date of birth: 8 December 1968 (age 57)
- Place of birth: Avellaneda, Argentina
- Height: 1.90 m (6 ft 3 in)
- Position: Goalkeeper

Senior career*
Years	Team	Apps	(Gls)
1987–1990	Defensa y Justicia	73	(0)
1990–1994	Lanús	126	(0)
1994–2000	Tenerife	159	(0)
2000	Estudiantes	3	(0)
2000–2001	Tenerife	0	(0)
2001	Argentinos Juniors	0	(0)

International career
1997	Argentina	1	(0)
- * Club domestic league appearances and goals as of 14 November 2008

Marcelo Leonardo Ojeda (born 8 December 1968) is an Argentine former footballer who played as a goalkeeper. He played in Argentina and Spain.

== Career ==
Ojeda started his playing career in 1987 in the Argentine 2nd division with Defensa y Justicia. In 1990, he joined Club Atlético Lanús of the Argentine Primera where he played until 1994.

In 1994 Ojeda joined CD Tenerife where he would spend most of the rest of his career. In 1997, he played 1 game for the Argentina national team and was a squad member for the 1997 Copa América.

In 2000, he returned to Argentina where he played 3 games for Estudiantes de La Plata before going back to Tenerife later that year. In 2001, he joined Argentinos Juniors but retired from football before ever playing for the club.
