= José María Buljubasich =

Argentine footballer

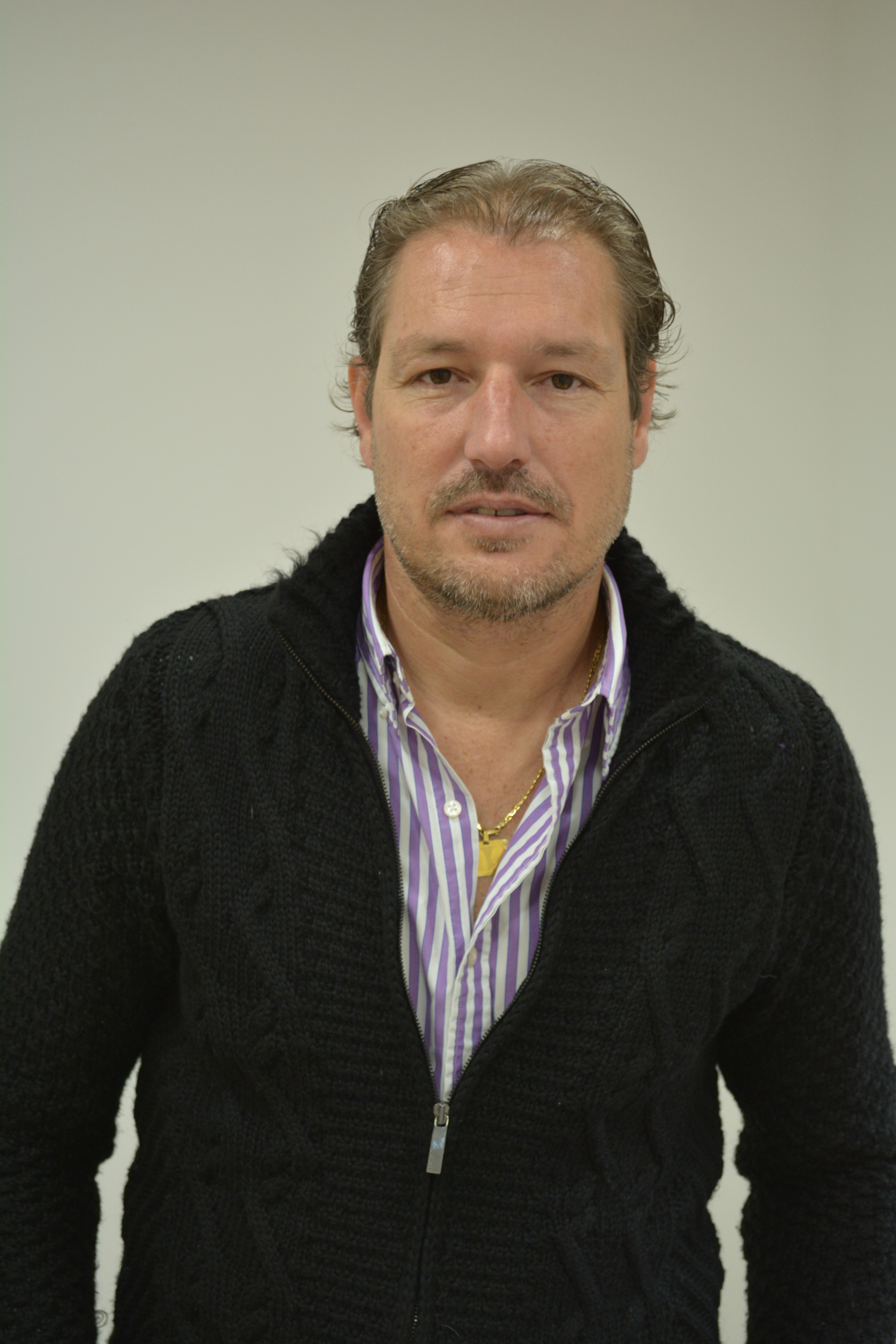
- Buljubasich in 2015

Personal information
- Full name: José María Buljubasich
- Date of birth: 12 May 1971 (age 55)
- Place of birth: Firmat (Santa Fe Province), Argentina
- Height: 1.91 m (6 ft 3 in)
- Position: Goalkeeper

Senior career*
Years	Team	Apps	(Gls)
1992–1994	Rosario Central	2	(0)
1994–1996	Tenerife	8	(0)
1996	UE Lleida	7	(0)
1997	Rosario Central	15	(0)
1997–1998	Real Oviedo	4	(0)
1998–2000	Rosario Central	76	(0)
2001	Los Andes	19	(0)
2001–2002	Monarcas Morelia	36	(0)
2002–2003	River Plate	17	(0)
2004	Unión Española	17	(0)
2005–2008	Universidad Católica	152	(0)
2009	Olimpia	29	(0)

Managerial career
- 2010–2026: Universidad Católica (sport manager)
- * Club domestic league appearances and goals

José María Buljubasich (born 12 May 1971 in Firmat, Argentina) is a former Argentine football player who played as a goalkeeper in Argentina, Spain, Mexico, Chile and Paraguay. He won two titles, one in Argentina and the other in Chile.

== Biography ==
He was born in Firmat in the province of Santa Fe, Argentina. He was the main goalkeeper for River Plate in 2003, a year in which the team won the Torneo de Clausura having as coach the international coach of Manchester City, Manuel Pellegrini.

In 2005, Buljubasich maintained a clean record of 1352 minutes without allowing a goal, this record put him in fourth place in the world according to the IFFHS. That year, Buljubasich won the Torneo de Clausura keeping a penalty off in the penalty kick-out; he was one of the best players of the Copa Sudamericana of that year.

In 2006, in the second semester the doctors of Universidad Católica found a tumour on "Tati"'s brain; he missed the rest of the 2006 season; but anyhow the operation was successfully done and he was allowed to play on the 2007–08 season.

On 30 December 2008, José Marías Buljubasich leaves Universidad Católica because he could not reach an agreement with the directives of the club.

Buljubasich moved to Olimpia of Paraguay for the 2009 Apertura tournament.

After an irregular 2009 Buljubasich decide it was time to retire from professional football. He played his last match of his career in a 3–1 loss to Guarani.

== Post-retirement ==
He currently has his residence in Santiago, Chile.

Buljubasich served as sport manager of Universidad Católica from 2010 to August 2026.

== Honours ==
Universidad Católica

- Primera División de Chile (1): 2005 Clausura
