= Antonio Mata =

Spanish footballer

Personal information
- Full name: Antonio Mata Oliveira
- Date of birth: 28 August 1968 (age 58)
- Place of birth: Olivenza, Spain
- Position: Defender

Senior career*
Years	Team	Apps	(Gls)
1987–1988	Atlético Malagueño		
1988–1991	CD Málaga		
1991–1999	CD Tenerife	196	(5)
1999–2000	Xerez CD		
2000–2001	UD Orotava		
- * Club domestic league appearances and goals

Antonio Mata (born 28 August 1968) is a Spanish footballer. He played 249 games in La Liga.

Scoring rarely, Mata is best known for his goal against Brøndby IF in the 119th minute of the 1996–97 UEFA Cup quarter-final in March 1997. The goal put Tenerife through to the semi-final. That game, and that goal, was also celebrated in 2022 as part of CD Tenerife's 100-year anniversary. Having also spent important years with CD Málaga, Mata took up residence in Málaga after retiring as a player.
