= Julio Llorente =

Spanish footballer

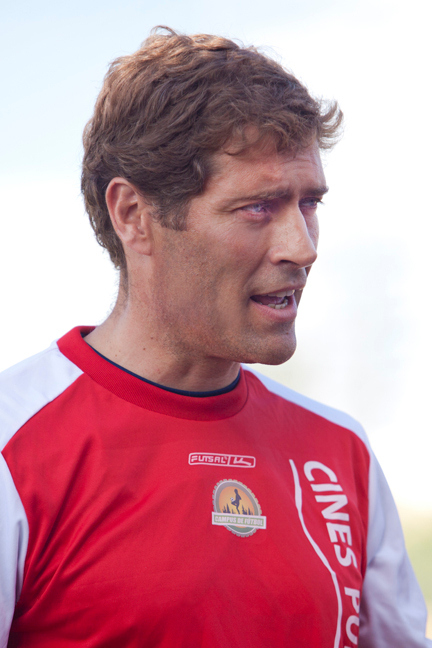
- Llorente in 2013

Personal information
- Full name: Julio Llorente Gento
- Date of birth: 14 June 1966 (age 60)
- Place of birth: Valladolid, Spain
- Height: 1.80 m (5 ft 11 in)
- Position: Right-back

Youth career
- Real Madrid

Senior career*
Years	Team	Apps	(Gls)
1985–1987	Castilla	53	(2)
1987–1990	Real Madrid	22	(2)
1987–1988	→ Mallorca (loan)	24	(1)
1990–1999	Tenerife	234	(17)
1999–2000	Salamanca	35	(1)
Total		368	(23)

International career
1984	Spain U18	1	(0)
1987–1988	Spain U21	7	(0)
- * Club domestic league appearances and goals

Julio Llorente Gento (born 14 June 1966) is a Spanish former professional footballer who played mainly as a right-back.

== Club career ==
Born in Valladolid, Castile and León, Llorente finished his development with La Liga giants Real Madrid, making his debut in the competition in the 1987–88 season with fellow top-division club RCD Mallorca, on loan. He returned to the Spanish capital upon his team's relegation, going on to play 33 competitive games during his two-year tenure and win five major titles, including two consecutive national championships. He appeared in six European Cup matches with the Merengues, scoring in a 6–0 home win against CA Spora Luxembourg in the 1989–90 edition.

Llorente signed with CD Tenerife in summer 1990, helping to the Canary Islands side's domestic and European consolidation. From 1994 to 1996 he scored a total of nine goals in 75 league matches, adding five appearances in the 1996–97 UEFA Cup to help them reach the semi-finals.

Tenerife were relegated to Segunda División in 1999, and the 33-year-old Llorente joined another club in that level, UD Salamanca, retiring after one season with top-flight totals of 280 games and 20 goals.

== Personal life ==
Llorente hailed from a sporting family. Aside from his uncle Francisco Gento, his three older brothers were also professionals: José Luis (1959) and Antonio "Toñín" (1963) played top-level basketball for well more than one decade (including at Real Madrid), while Francisco spent seven seasons with Real Madrid, coinciding with Julio from 1988 to 1990.

== Honours ==
Real Madrid

- La Liga: 1988–89, 1989–90
- Copa del Rey: 1988–89
