= 1989–90 Copa del Rey =

88th Copa del Rey

Tournament details
- Country: Spain
- Teams: 44

Final positions
- Champions: FC Barcelona
- Runners-up: Real Madrid

Tournament statistics
- Matches played: 83
- Goals scored: 206 (2.48 per match)
- Top goal scorer: John Aldridge (6)

The 1989–90 Copa del Rey was the 88th staging of the Spanish Cup. The competition began on 6 September 1989 and concluded on 5 April 1990 with the final.

== First round ==
Team 1	Agg.	Team 2	1st leg	2nd leg
UD Alzira (3)	1–3	CD Málaga(1)	1–1	0–2
Barcelona Atlético(3)	2–0	CD Logroñés(1)	0–0	2–0
Real Betis(2)	2–1	RCD Mallorca(1)	1–0	1–1
Real Burgos CF(2)	1–2	Real Sociedad(1)	0–1	1–1
Castilla CF (2)	2–3	Real Oviedo(1)	2–1	0–2
Deportivo La Coruña(2)	3–6	CD Tenerife(1)	3–3	0–3
Elche CF(2)	3–2	SD Eibar(2)	2–1	1–1
RCD Español(2)	0–1	Sevilla FC (1)	0–0	0–1
UE Figueres (2)	3–4	Sporting Gijón (1)	1–4	2–0
UD Las Palmas(2)	1–3	Celta Vigo(1)	0–1	1–2
Levante UD (2)	3–4	Rayo Vallecano(1)	2–1	1–3
UE Lleida (3)	1–3	Atlético Madrileño(2)	1–0	0–3
CFJ Mollerussa (3)	1–6	Cádiz CF(1)	1–3	0–3
Real Murcia(2)	4–7	CD Castellón(1)	3–4	1–3
Palamós CF(2)	1–5	Athletic Bilbao(1)	0–2	1–3
Racing Santander(2)	3–5	Sestao SC(2)	2–3	1–2
Bilbao Athletic (2)		Xerez CD(2)		
Recreativo Huelva(2)	4–3	UD Salamanca(2)	2–1	2–2
CE Sabadell FC(2)	2–1	CA Osasuna(1)	2–0	0–1

== Second round ==
Team 1	Agg.	Team 2	1st leg	2nd leg
Atlético Madrileño (2)	4–5	Real Sociedad (1)	2–2	2–3
Barcelona Atlético(3)	3–3 (1–3 p.)	Cádiz CF (1)	1–1	2–2
Real Betis (2)	3–2	CD Castellón(1)	2–0	1–2
Elche CF (2)	0–0 (1–3 p.)	Sporting Gijón(1)	0–0	0–0
Xerez CD (2)	1–3	CD Málaga(1)	1–1	0–2
Recreativo Huelva(2)	2–4	Real Oviedo(1)	1–0	1–4
CE Sabadell FC(2)	2–1	Sevilla FC(1)	1–0	1–1
Sestao SC (2)	1–3	Celta Vigo(1)	0–2	1–1
CD Tenerife (1)	5–3	Rayo Vallecano(1)	2–2	3–1

- Bye: Athletic Bilbao

== Round of 16 ==
Team 1	Agg.	Team 2	1st leg	2nd leg
Athletic Bilbao (1)	0–2	FC Barcelona(1)	0–1	0–1
Atlético Madrid (1)	0–2	Real Madrid(1)	0–0	0–2
Real Betis (2)	1–2	Cádiz CF (1)	1–0	0–2
Real Oviedo (1)	1–2	Real Zaragoza (1)	0–1	1–1
CE Sabadell FC (2)	3–3 (5–6 p.)	Real Sociedad (1)	1–0	2–3
CD Tenerife(1)	0–3	Sporting Gijón (1)	0–0	0–3
Valencia CF(1)	5–0	Celta Vigo(1)	5–0	0–0
Real Valladolid(1)	9–3	CD Málaga(1)	6–1	3–2

== Quarter-finals ==
Team 1	Agg.	Team 2	1st leg	2nd leg
Real Madrid CF (1)	3–1	Real Valladolid (1)	3–0	0–1
Real Sociedad (1)	3–4	FC Barcelona(1)	0–1	3–3
Sporting Gijón(1)	1–2	Cádiz CF(1)	0–0	1–2
Real Zaragoza (1)	2–2 (1–3 p)	Valencia CF(1)	2–1	0–1

== Semi-finals ==
Team 1	Agg.	Team 2	1st leg	2nd leg
FC Barcelona(1)	3–2	Valencia CF(1)	2–1	1–1
Cádiz CF(1)	0–4	Real Madrid CF(1)	0–1	0–3

== Final ==
Team 1	Score	Team 2
FC Barcelona	2–0	Real Madrid CF

Copa del Rey
1989–90 winners
FC Barcelona
