= 1983–84 Copa del Rey =

82nd Copa del Rey

Tournament details
- Country: Spain
- Dates: 7 September 1983 – 5 May 1984
- Teams: 136

Final positions
- Champions: Athletic Bilbao
- Runners-up: FC Barcelona

Tournament statistics
- Matches played: 269
- Goals scored: 751 (2.79 per match)

The 1983–84 Copa del Rey was the 82nd staging of the Spanish Cup, the annual domestic football cup competition in Spain. The tournament was attended by 136 teams from the higher echelons of Spanish football.

The tournament began on 7 September 1983 and ended on 5 May 1984 with the final, held in Santiago Bernabéu Stadium, in Madrid.

FC Barcelona played their second consecutive final but lost to Athletic Bilbao in a match remembered for its incidents, toughness and especially a scuffle at the end. The match was preceded by controversial statements from both sides and with memories of the previous game in which Maradona was seriously injured. Once the game finished, Maradona himself started a fight that ended with all players in a pitched battle.

The match ended with a 1–0 victory for the Basque team. This was their twenty-third win in this competition and was part of their fifth double.

== Format ==
Schedule
Round	Fixture	Clubs	Gain entry
First round	64	136 → 72	All Clubs participating gain entry
Second round	34	72 → 38	Atlético de Madrid, Real Madrid CF, Sevilla FC (*)
Third round	18	38 → 20	
Fourth round	4	20 → 16	Athletic Bilbao (*)
Round of 16	8	16 → 8	FC Barcelona (*)
Quarter-finals	4	8 → 4	
Semi-finals	2	4 → 2	
Final	1	2 → 1	

Teams
Division	No. clubs
1ª División	18
2ª División	20
2ª División B	26
3ª División	72
Total teams	136

- All rounds are played over two legs except the final which is played a single match in a neutral venue. The team that has the higher aggregate score over the two legs progresses to the next round.
- In case of a tie on aggregate, will play an extra time of 30 minutes, and if still tied, will be decided with a penalty shoot-outs.
- The teams that play European competitions are exempt until the round of 16 or when they are removed from the tournament.
- The winners of the competition will earn a place in the group stage of next season's UEFA Cup Winners' Cup, if they have not already qualified for European competition, if so then the runners-up will instead take this berth.

(*) Teams playing European competition.

== First round ==
First round
Home 1st leg	Agg.	Home 2nd leg	1st leg			2nd leg			Notes
AD Parla	5–1	Atlético Madrileño	7 Sep 1983	3–0		28 Sep 1983	1–2		
SD Ponferradina	2–5	Real Valladolid Deportivo	7 Sep 1983	1–2		28 Sep 1983	3–1	Rep.	
CD Tarancón	3–1	CP Cacereño	13 Sep 1983	2–0		28 Sep 1983	1–1		
Club Lemos	0–2	Arousa SC	14 Sep 1983	0–1		28 Sep 1983	1–0		
SD Compostela	0–2	CD Lugo	14 Sep 1983	0–0		28 Sep 1983	2–0		
Celta de Vigo	2–3	CD Ourense	14 Sep 1983	1–0		28 Sep 1983	3–1		
Pontevedra CF	1–2	Deportivo de La Coruña	14 Sep 1983	1–0		28 Sep 1983	2–0		
Real Avilés Industrial	1–5	Real Oviedo CF	14 Sep 1983	0–2		28 Sep 1983	3–1		
Racing de Santander	6–0	Gimnástica de Torrelavega	14 Sep 1983	0–2		28 Sep 1983	4–0		
CD Anaitasuna	3–2	CD Aurrerá	14 Sep 1983	1–1		28 Sep 1983	1–2		
Sestao SC	0–2	Real Sociedad	14 Sep 1983	0–0	Rep.	28 Sep 1983	2–0	Rep.	
Bilbao Athletic	3–2	CD Baskonia	14 Sep 1983	2–1		27 Sep 1983	1–1		
CF Jacetano	2–12	CA Osasuna	14 Sep 1983	1–8	Rep.	28 Sep 1983	4–1	Rep.	
AD Sabiñánigo	6–2	CD Peña Sport	14 Sep 1983	3–0		28 Sep 1983	2–3		
CD Tudelano	1–4	CD Logroñés	14 Sep 1983	1–1		21 Sep 1983	3–0		
Deportivo Aragón	5–4	SD Huesca	14 Sep 1983	5–1		28 Sep 1983	3–0		
UE Sant Andreu	2–3 (aet)	FC Andorra	14 Sep 1983	1–1	Rep.	28 Sep 1983	2–1	Rep.	
CE Sabadell FC	2–1	UE Figueres	14 Sep 1983	1–0	Rep.	28 Sep 1983	1–1	Rep.	
UD Olot	0–0 (p)	UE Lleida	14 Sep 1983	0–0	Rep.	28 Sep 1983	0–0	Rep.	Penalties: 3–4 for UD Olot.
RCD Espanyol	2–2 (p)	Gimnàstic de Tarragona	14 Sep 1983	1–0	Rep.	28 Sep 1983	2–1	Rep.	Penalties: 7–6 for Gimnàstic de Tarragona.
CF Badalona	1–3	FC Barcelona Atlètic	14 Sep 1983	1–0	Rep.	28 Sep 1983	3–0	Rep.	
CF Lloret	4–3	CD Banyoles	14 Sep 1983	2–2	Rep.	28 Sep 1983	2–1	Rep.	
CD Castellón	3–1	CD Mestalla	14 Sep 1983	3–0		28 Sep 1983	1–0		
Valencia CF	3–2	CD Alcoyano	14 Sep 1983	3–1	Rep.	28 Sep 1983	1–0		
Benidorm CD	3–6	CD Burriana	14 Sep 1983	2–2		28 Sep 1983	4–1		
Real Madrid Aficionados	1–2	CD Badajoz	14 Sep 1983	0–0		28 Sep 1983	2–1		
CD Manchego	3–2	Real Aranjuez CF	14 Sep 1983	1–0		28 Sep 1983	2–2		
Imperial CF	1–3	Cartagena FC	14 Sep 1983	0–1		28 Sep 1983	2–1		
Hércules CF	9–2	AP Almansa	14 Sep 1983	2–1		28 Sep 1983	0–7		
Torrevieja CF	1–4	Real Murcia CF	14 Sep 1983	1–1	Rep.	28 Sep 1983	3–0	Rep.	
CD Eldense	1–3	Elche CF	14 Sep 1983	1–2		28 Sep 1983	1–0		
Albacete Balompié	3–2	Orihuela Deportiva CF	14 Sep 1983	1–1		28 Sep 1983	1–2		
Gimnástica Arandina	3–7	Real Oviedo Aficionados	14 Sep 1983	3–2		27 Sep 1983	5–0		
UD Salamanca	5–0	Atlético Astorga CF	14 Sep 1983	3–0	Rep.	28 Sep 1983	0–2		
Real Valladolid Promesas	2–2 (p)	Palencia CF	14 Sep 1983	1–1		28 Sep 1983	1–1		Penalties: 4–2 for Real Valladolid Promesas.
CD Pozoblanco	2–1	Atlético Benamiel	14 Sep 1983	1–1		28 Sep 1983	0–1		
CF Industrial Melilla	2–6	CD Málaga	14 Sep 1983	1–3	Rep.	20 Sep 1983	3–1	Rep.	
Real Balompédica Linense	5–4	Córdoba CF	14 Sep 1983	3–3		28 Sep 1983	1–2	Rep.	
Linares CF	4–3	CD Antequerano	14 Sep 1983	1–1		28 Sep 1983	2–3		
Granada CF	3–1	CF Villanueva de Mesía	14 Sep 1983	2–0		28 Sep 1983	1–1		
Atlético Marbella	4–3	CD Macael	14 Sep 1983	3–1		28 Sep 1983	2–1		
Recreativo de Huelva	3–2	Algeciras CF	14 Sep 1983	2–0	Rep.	28 Sep 1983	2–1	Rep.	
Cádiz CF	9–0	AD Ceuta	14 Sep 1983	9–0	Rep.	28 Sep 1983	0–0		
UD Telde	0–7	UD Las Palmas	14 Sep 1983	1–0		28 Sep 1983	7–0		
CD Tenerife	1–1 (p)	UD Güímar	14 Sep 1983	1–0		28 Sep 1983	1–0		Penalties: 3–1 for UD Güímar.
CD Constància	2–1	CD Murense	14 Sep 1983	1–1		28 Sep 1983	0–1		
CD Manacor	1–6	RCD Mallorca	14 Sep 1983	0–2	Rep.	28 Sep 1983	4–1	Rep.	
Racing de Ferrol	1–0	Gran Peña Celtista	14 Sep 1983	1–0		28 Sep 1983	0–0		
UP Langreo	0–6	Sporting de Gijón	15 Sep 1983	0–1	Rep.	28 Sep 1983	5–0	Rep.	
Castro FC	2–3	Deportivo Rayo Cantabria	15 Sep 1983	1–1		28 Sep 1983	2–1		
SD Amorebieta	0–5	Deportivo Alavés	15 Sep 1983	0–2		28 Sep 1983	3–0		
Cultural Durango	1–3	SD Eibar	15 Sep 1983	0–0		21 Sep 1983	3–1		
UD Vall de Uxó	0–6	Levante UD	15 Sep 1983	0–2		28 Sep 1983	4–0		
Rayo Vallecano	6–1	Mérida Industrial CF	15 Sep 1983	5–1	Rep.	28 Sep 1983	0–1		
CD Pegaso	6–4	Real Ávila CF	15 Sep 1983	6–1		28 Sep 1983	3–0		
CP Villarrobledo	1–2	CF Gandía	15 Sep 1983	1–1		28 Sep 1983	1–0		
Gimnástica Medinense	2–6	Zamora CF	15 Sep 1983	0–1		22 Sep 1983	5–2		
Brenes CF	1–6	Xerez CD	15 Sep 1983	1–1	Rep.	28 Sep 1983	5–0	Rep.	
CD Puerto Cruz	1–2	CD San Andrés	15 Sep 1983	1–1		28 Sep 1983	1–0		
CD Badía	1–1 (p)	UD Porreras	15 Sep 1983	0–0		28 Sep 1983	1–1		Penalties: x–x for CD Badía.
Sevilla Atlético	0–1	Real Betis	19 Sep 1983	0–1	Rep.	28 Sep 1983	0–0	Rep.	
Atlético Monzón	3–11	Real Zaragoza	21 Sep 1983	0–6	Rep.	28 Sep 1983	5–3	Rep.	
CD Talavera	2–4	Castilla CF	21 Sep 1983	1–2	Rep.	28 Sep 1983	2–1		
Coria CF	5–1	Racing Portuense	21 Sep 1983	3–1	Rep.	28 Sep 1983	0–2	Rep.	
Bye: SD Tenisca, SD Portmany, UD Las Palmas Atlético, Athletic Bilbao, Atlético de Madrid, FC Barcelona, Real Madrid CF, Sevilla FC.
Results of matches played: September 8, 13 / September 14 / September 15 / September 21 / September 22 / September 27 / September 28

== Second round ==
Second round
Home 1st leg	Agg.	Home 2nd leg	1st leg			2nd leg			Notes
Deportivo Rayo Cantabria	0–8	Real Sociedad	11 Oct 1983	0–1	Rep.	19 Oct 1983	7–0	Rep.	
CD Tarancón	1–10	Atlético de Madrid	12 Oct 1983	1–5	Rep.	18 Oct 1983	5–0	Rep.	
Real Balompédica Linense	1–7	Real Betis	12 Oct 1983	1–3	Rep.	19 Oct 1983	4–0	Rep.	
Recreativo de Huelva	1–0	Cádiz CF	12 Oct 1983	0–0	Rep.	19 Oct 1983	0–1	Rep.	
Coria CF	2–8	CD Málaga	12 Oct 1983	1–4	Rep.	19 Oct 1983	4–1	Rep.	
CD Badía	0–3	RCD Mallorca	12 Oct 1983	0–2	Rep.	18 Oct 1983	1–0	Rep.	
Levante UD	2–3	Real Murcia CF	12 Oct 1983	1–0	Rep.	19 Oct 1983	3–1	Rep.	
CA Osasuna	8–2	AD Sabiñánigo	12 Oct 1983	7–2	Rep.	19 Oct 1983	0–1	Rep.	
CD Badajoz	2–9	Real Madrid CF	12 Oct 1983	1–2	Rep.	19 Oct 1983	7–1	Rep.	
UD Salamanca	4–2	Palencia CF	12 Oct 1983	2–1	Rep.	19 Oct 1983	1–2	Rep.	
Sevilla FC	3–3 (p)	Granada CF	12 Oct 1983	0–0	Rep.	19 Oct 1983	3–3	Rep.	Penalties: 6–5 for Granada CF.
Real Oviedo Aficionados	1–5	Sporting de Gijón	12 Oct 1983	0–1	Rep.	19 Oct 1983	4–1	Rep.	
CF Gandía	2–5 (aet)	Valencia CF	12 Oct 1983	2–1	Rep.	19 Oct 1983	4–0	Rep.	
Real Valladolid Deportivo	3–1	Zamora CF	12 Oct 1983	3–0	Rep.	19 Oct 1983	1–0	Rep.	
CD Logroñés	1–7	Real Zaragoza	12 Oct 1983	1–4	Rep.	19 Oct 1983	3–0	Rep.	
CF Lloret	2–7	FC Barcelona Atlètic	12 Oct 1983	2–1	Rep.	19 Oct 1983	6–0	Rep.	
Deportivo Aragón	3–1	Bilbao Athletic	12 Oct 1983	2–1		19 Oct 1983	0–1		
Albacete Balompié	4–5	Cartagena FC	12 Oct 1983	2–0		19 Oct 1983	5–2		
CD Burriana	3–4	CD Castellón	12 Oct 1983	1–2		19 Oct 1983	2–2	Rep.	
Castilla CF	6–1	CD Manchego	12 Oct 1983	4–1	Rep.	19 Oct 1983	0–2	Rep.	
CD Ourense	3–4	Deportivo de La Coruña	12 Oct 1983	2–1		19 Oct 1983	3–1		
Hércules CF	1–1 (p)	Elche CF	12 Oct 1983	0–1		19 Oct 1983	0–1		Penalties: x–x for Hércules CF.
SD Tenisca	1–9	UD Las Palmas	12 Oct 1983	1–0		19 Oct 1983	9–0		
Linares CF	5–1	Atlético Marbella	12 Oct 1983	4–0	Rep.	19 Oct 1983	1–1	Rep.	
CD Lugo	1–2	Real Oviedo CF	12 Oct 1983	1–1		19 Oct 1983	1–0		
Racing de Santander	2–3	SD Eibar	12 Oct 1983	1–1		19 Oct 1983	2–1	Rep.	
Rayo Vallecano	7–2	AD Parla	12 Oct 1983	2–0	Rep.	19 Oct 1983	2–5	Rep.	
CD Anaitasuna	1–6	Deportivo Alavés	12 Oct 1983	0–1		19 Oct 1983	5–1		
CE Sabadell FC	2–2 (p)	FC Andorra	12 Oct 1983	1–0	Rep.	19 Oct 1983	2–1	Rep.	Penalties: 4–5 for CE Sabadell FC.
Racing de Ferrol	2–3	Arousa SC	12 Oct 1983	1–3		19 Oct 1983	0–1		
Gimnàstic de Tarragona	1–3	UD Olot	12 Oct 1983	0–1	Rep.	19 Oct 1983	2–1	Rep.	
Xerez CD	4–2	CD Pozoblanco	12 Oct 1983	3–1		19 Oct 1983	1–1	Rep.	
CD Constància	3–6	SD Portmany	12 Oct 1983	3–1		19 Oct 1983	5–0		
CD San Andrés	3–5	UD Las Palmas Atlético	12 Oct 1983	2–0		19 Oct 1983	5–1		
Bye: CD Pegaso, UD Güímar, Athletic Bilbao, FC Barcelona.
Results of matches played: October 12 / October 19

== Third round ==
Third round
Home 1st leg	Agg.	Home 2nd leg	1st leg			2nd leg			Notes
Deportivo Alavés	0–3	Linares CF	3 Nov 1983	0–1	Rep.	23 Nov 1983	2–0	Rep.	
Deportivo Aragón	2–4	Real Sociedad	1 Nov 1983	0–2	Rep.	23 Nov 1983	2–2	Rep.	
Arousa SC	3–4	CA Osasuna	1 Nov 1983	2–1	Rep.	22 Nov 1983	3–1	Rep.	
Cartagena FC	1–2	Granada CF	2 Nov 1983	3–0	Rep.	23 Nov 1983	1–1	Rep.	
Castilla CF	4–2	Real Betis	2 Nov 1983	4–1	Rep.	23 Nov 1983	1–0	Rep.	
UD Güímar	0–4	Sporting de Gijón	2 Nov 1983	0–2	Rep.	23 Nov 1983	4–0	Rep.	
Xerez CD	5–2	UD Las Palmas Atlético	1 Nov 1983	3–0	Rep.	23 Nov 1983	2–2	Rep.	
UD Las Palmas	3–1 (aet)	UD Salamanca	2 Nov 1983	0–0	Rep.	23 Nov 1983	1–3	Rep.	
CD Málaga	5–1	SD Eibar	1 Nov 1983	2–0	Rep.	23 Nov 1983	1–3	Rep.	
RCD Mallorca	0–2	FC Barcelona Atlètic	1 Nov 1983	0–0	Rep.	23 Nov 1983	2–0	Rep.	
Real Murcia CF	1–1 (p)	CD Castellón	1 Nov 1983	1–0	Rep.	23 Nov 1983	1–0	Rep.	Penalties: 5–4 for CD Castellón.
CD Pegaso	1–3 (aet)	Deportivo de La Coruña	9 Nov 1983	1–0	Rep.	23 Nov 1983	3–0	Rep.	
UD Olot	0–6	Hércules CF	1 Nov 1983	0–4	Rep.	23 Nov 1983	2–0	Rep.	
Real Oviedo CF	0–3	Real Madrid CF	1 Nov 1983	0–1	Rep.	23 Nov 1983	2–0	Rep.	
SD Portmany	3–5	Atlético de Madrid	2 Nov 1983	2–2	Rep.	17 Nov 1983	3–1	Rep.	
Recreativo de Huelva	2–3	Valencia CF	2 Nov 1983	0–1	Rep.	23 Nov 1983	2–2	Rep.	
CE Sabadell FC	3–2	Real Zaragoza	1 Nov 1983	2–1	Rep.	23 Nov 1983	1–1	Rep.	
Real Valladolid Deportivo	6–3	Rayo Vallecano	1 Nov 1983	4–3	Rep.	22 Nov 1983	0–2	Rep.	
Bye: Athletic Bilbao, FC Barcelona.

== Fourth round ==
Fourth round
Home 1st leg	Agg.	Home 2nd leg	1st leg			2nd leg			Notes
Cartagena CF	0–5	Athletic Bilbao	7 Dec 1983	0–3	Rep.	27 Dec 1983	2–0	Rep.	
Hércules CF	3–3 (p)	CD Málaga	7 Dec 1983	2–1	Rep.	20 Dec 1983	2–1	Rep.	Penalties: 4–5 for Hércules CF.
UD Las Palmas	4–2	Real Valladolid Deportivo	7 Dec 1983	2–0	Rep.	28 Dec 1983	2–2	Rep.	
CE Sabadell FC	2–5	Real Madrid CF	8 Dec 1983	1–2	Rep.	22 Dec 1983	3–1	Rep.	
Bye: FC Barcelona Atlètic, CA Osasuna, Castilla CF, CD Castellón, Atlético de Madrid, Linares CF, Deportivo de La Coruña, Real Sociedad, Sporting de Gijón, Valencia CF, Xerez CD, FC Barcelona.

== Bracket ==
Round of 16
1	Deportivo de La Coruña	0	1	1
16	CD Castellón	0	0	0
8	FC Barcelona Atlètic	0	0	0
9	Real Madrid CF	0	1	1
5	Xerez CD	0	0	0
12	Sporting de Gijón	3	4	7
4	Athletic Bilbao (3–5 p)	0	1	1
13	Real Sociedad	0	1	1
6	Hércules CF	2	0	2
11	FC Barcelona	1	3	4
3	Atlético de Madrid	0	1	1
14	CA Osasuna	0	2	2
7	Castilla CF	3	1	4
10	Valencia CF	2	1	3
2	UD Las Palmas	1	1	2
15	Linares CF	0	0	0

Quarter-finals
Deportivo de La Coruña	2	0	2
Real Madrid CF	1	3	4
Sporting de Gijón	2	0	2
Athletic Bilbao	1	2	3
FC Barcelona	4	2	6
CA Osasuna	0	3	3
Castilla CF	2	0	2
UD Las Palmas	0	3	3

Semi-finals
Real Madrid CF	0	1	1
Athletic Bilbao (4–3 p)	1	0	1
FC Barcelona (2–4 p)	2	0	2
UD Las Palmas	1	1	2

Final
Athletic Bilbao	1
FC Barcelona	0

== Round of 16 ==
Team 1	Agg.	Team 2	1st leg	2nd leg
Deportivo de La Coruña	1–0	Castellón	0–0	1–0
Barcelona Atletic	0–1	Real Madrid	0–0	0–1
Xerez	0–7	Sporting de Gijón	0–3	0–4
Athletic Bilbao	1–1 (5–3 p)	Real Sociedad	0–0	1–1
Hércules	2–4	Barcelona	2–1	0–3
Atlético de Madrid	1–2	Osasuna	0–0	1–2
Castilla	4–3	Valencia	3–2	1–1
Las Palmas	2–0	Linares	1–0	1–0

=== First leg ===
25 January 1984	Athletic Bilbao	0–0	Real Sociedad	Bilbao
20:15 CET		Report (in Spanish)		Stadium: San Mamés; Attendance: 40,000; Referee: Sánchez Arminio

25 January 1984	Xerez CD	0–3	Sporting de Gijón	Jerez de la Frontera
20:30 CET		Report (in Spanish)	Cunningham 5', 35'; Eloy 73'	Stadium: Domecq; Attendance: 9,000; Referee: Benavente Garasa

25 January 1984	Deportivo de La Coruña	0–0	CD Castellón	A Coruña
20:30 CET		Report (in Spanish)		Stadium: Riazor; Attendance: 5,000; Referee: Garagorri Langara

25 January 1984	FC Barcelona Atlètic	0–0	Real Madrid CF	Barcelona
21:00 CET		Report (in Spanish)		Stadium: Mini Estadi; Referee: Urío Velázquez

25 January 1984	Hércules CF	2–1	FC Barcelona	Alicante
21:00 CET	Sanabria 18' (pen.), 54' (pen.)	Report (in Spanish)	Víctor 8'	Stadium: José Rico Pérez; Attendance: 37,000; Referee: Andújar Oliver

25 January 1984	Castilla CF	3–2	Valencia CF	Madrid
21:00 CET	Pardeza 30'; Michel 83'; Butragueño 86'	Report (in Spanish)	Kempes 2'; Saura 60'	Stadium: Santiago Bernabéu; Referee: Marín López

25 January 1984	Atlético de Madrid	0–0	CA Osasuna	Madrid
21:00 CET		Report (in Spanish)		Stadium: Vicente Calderón; Attendance: 15,000; Referee: Enríquez Negreira

25 January 1984	UD Las Palmas	1–0	Linares CF	Las Palmas de Gran Canaria
21:30 CET	Contreras 6'	Report (in Spanish)		Stadium: Insular; Attendance: 6,000; Referee: Sánchez Molina

=== Second leg ===
8 February 1984	Real Sociedad	1–1 (a.e.t.) (3–5 p)	Athletic Bilbao	San Sebastián
20:00 CET	Celayeta 49'	Report (in Spanish)	Goikoetxea 65'	Stadium: Atotxa; Referee: Ramos Marcos
	Penalties
	Uralde (penalty scored); Diego (penalty scored); Celayeta (penalty missed); Zamora (penalty scored)		(penalty scored) Urtubi; (penalty scored) Sola; (penalty scored) Argote; (penalty scored) Urquiaga; (penalty scored) Julio Salinas

8 February 1984	Sporting de Gijón	4–0	Xerez CD	Gijón
20:15 CET	Campuzano 7'; Ferrero 67'; Maceda 73'; Abel 83'	Report (in Spanish)		Stadium: El Molinón; Attendance: 8,000; Referee: Borrás Del Barrio

8 February 1984	CD Castellón	0–1	Deportivo de La Coruña	Castellón de la Plana
20:30 CET		Report (in Spanish)	Celeiro 54'	Stadium: Castalia; Referee: Hernández Velázquez

8 February 1984	CA Osasuna	2–1	Atlético de Madrid	Pamplona
20:30 CET	Martín 4'; Lumbreras 88'	Report (in Spanish)	Landáburu 90'	Stadium: El Sadar; Referee: Martín Navarrete

8 February 1984	Linares CF	0–1	UD Las Palmas	Linares
20:30 CET		Report (in Spanish)	Pepe Juan 70'	Stadium: Municipal de Linarejos; Attendance: 4,000; Referee: Burgos Núñez

8 February 1984	Valencia CF	1–1	Castilla CF	Valencia
21:00 CET	Kempes 26'	Report (in Spanish)	Pardeza 19'	Stadium: Luís Casanova; Attendance: 40,000; Referee: Casajuana Rifà (Catalonia)

8 February 1984	Real Madrid CF	1–0	FC Barcelona Atlètic	Madrid
21:00 CET	Santillana 43'	Report (in Spanish)		Stadium: Santiago Bernabéu; Attendance: 25,000; Referee: Bayarri Ribelles

8 February 1984	FC Barcelona	3–0	Hércules CF	Barcelona
21:15 CET	Schuster 70'; Maradona 80'; Quini 83'	Report (in Spanish)		Stadium: Camp Nou; Referee: Mayoral Cedenilla

== Quarter-finals ==
Team 1	Agg.	Team 2	1st leg	2nd leg
Deportivo de La Coruña	2–4	Real Madrid	2–1	0–3
Sporting de Gijón	2–3	Athletic Bilbao	2–1	0–2
Barcelona	6–3	Osasuna	4–0	2–3
Castilla	2–3	Las Palmas	2–0	0–3

=== First leg ===
22 February 1984	Sporting de Gijón	2–1	Athletic Bilbao	Gijón
20:30 CET	Ferrero 6'; Abel 42'	Report (in Spanish)	Endika 29'	Stadium: El Molinón; Attendance: 20,000; Referee: Marín López

22 February 1984	Deportivo de La Coruña	2–1	Real Madrid CF	A Coruña
20:30 CET	Moreno 32'; Bonet 53' (o.g.)	Report (in Spanish)	Ángel 30'	Stadium: Riazor; Attendance: 30,000; Referee: Jiménez Moreno

22 February 1984	Castilla CF	2–0	UD Las Palmas	Madrid
21:00 CET	Butragueño 26' (pen.); Julià 70'	Report (in Spanish)		Stadium: Santiago Bernabéu; Attendance: 30,000; Referee: Taboada Soto

22 February 1984	FC Barcelona	4–0	CA Osasuna	Barcelona
21:15 CET	Quini 10', 16', 51', 58'	Report (in Spanish)		Stadium: Camp Nou; Attendance: — Referee: García de Loza

=== Second leg ===
14 March 1984	Athletic Bilbao	2–0	Sporting de Gijón	Bilbao
20:15 CET	De Andrés 2'; Noriega 46'	Report (in Spanish)		Stadium: San Mamés; Attendance: — Referee: Sánchez Molina

14 March 1984	CA Osasuna	3–2	FC Barcelona	Pamplona
20:30 CET	Iriguíbel 63' 68'; Esparza 74'	Report (in Spanish)	Clos 52'; Víctor 56'	Stadium: El Sadar; Referee: Martín Navarrete

14 March 1984	Real Madrid CF	3–0	Deportivo de La Coruña	Madrid
20:30 CET	Santillana 24'; Pineda 39'; Isidro 67'	Report (in Spanish)		Stadium: Santiago Bernabéu; Attendance: 5,000; Referee: Borrás Del Barrio

14 March 1984	UD Las Palmas	3–0	Castilla CF	Las Palmas de Gran Canaria
21:30 CET	Alexis 14', 25'; Contreras 40'	Report (in Spanish)		Stadium: Insular; Referee: Martínez de la Fuente

== Semi-finals ==
Team 1	Agg.	Team 2	1st leg	2nd leg
Real Madrid	1–1 (3–4 p)	Athletic Bilbao	0–1	1–0
Barcelona	2–2 (4–2 p)	Las Palmas	2–1	0–1

=== First leg ===
4 April 1984	Real Madrid CF	0–1	Athletic Bilbao	Madrid
21:00 CET		Report (in Spanish)	Urtubi 24' (pen.)	Stadium: Santiago Bernabéu; Referee: Valdés Sánchez

4 April 1984	FC Barcelona	2–1	UD Las Palmas	Barcelona
21:25 CET	Clos 3'; Alexanko 68'	Report (in Spanish)	Saavedra 22'	Stadium: Camp Nou; Referee: Damín Rendón

=== Second leg ===
18 April 1984	Athletic Bilbao	0–1 (a.e.t.) (4–3 p)	Real Madrid CF	Bilbao
20:15 CET		Report (in Spanish)	Pineda 44'	Stadium: San Mamés; Referee: Enríquez Negreira
	Penalties
	Urtubi (penalty scored); Dani (penalty scored); Argote (penalty missed); Sola (penalty scored); Núñez (penalty scored)		(penalty missed) Camacho; (penalty scored) Salguero; (penalty missed) Stielike; (penalty scored) Chendo; (penalty scored) Juanito

18 April 1984	UD Las Palmas	1–0 (a.e.t.) (2–4 p)	FC Barcelona	Las Palmas de Gran Canaria
21:30 CET	Contreras 59'	Report (in Spanish)		Stadium: Insular; Attendance: 27,000; Referee: Urío Velázquez
	Penalties
	Pepe Juan (penalty scored); Contreras (penalty missed); Julio Durán (penalty scored); Félix (penalty missed)		(penalty scored) Pichi Alonso; (penalty scored) Maradona; (penalty missed) Alexanko; (penalty scored) Sánchez; (penalty scored) Esteban

== Final ==
5 May 1984
20:15 CET

Athletic Bilbao	1–0	FC Barcelona
Endika 13'	Report (in Spanish)

Santiago Bernabéu, Madrid
Attendance: 100,000
Referee: Franco Martínez (Region of Murcia)

Copa del Rey
1983–84 winners
Athletic Bilbao
23rd title
