= 1984–85 Segunda División B =

Season of third division football in Spain

Segunda División B
- Season: 1984–85
- Champions: Sestao SC; Rayo Vallecano
- Promoted: Sestao SC; Rayo Vallecano; Albacete Balompié; Deportivo Aragón
- Relegated: Osasuna Promesas; Real Avilés Industrial; Club Erandio; CA Marbella; CD Badajoz; CD Antequerano
- Matches: 760
- Goals: 1,826 (2.4 per match)
- Top goalscorer: Ramón Masqué (20 goals)
- Best goalkeeper: Juano (0.50 goals/match)
- Biggest home win: Figueres 10–2 Real Avilés Industrial (9 September 1984)
- Biggest away win: Antequerano 0–4 Jaén (12 May 1985)
- Highest scoring: Figueres 10–2 Real Avilés Industrial (9 September 1984)

The 1984–85 Segunda División B season was the 8th since its establishment. The first matches of the season were played on 1 September 1984, and the season ended on 17 May 1985.

The division consisted of two geographic groups. Sestao SC were the Group I champions and Rayo Vallecano were the Group II champions.

== Overview before the season ==
40 teams joined the league, including four relegated from the 1983–84 Segunda División and 6 promoted from the 1983–84 Tercera División. The composition of the groups was determined by the Royal Spanish Football Federation, attending to geographical criteria.

Relegated from Segunda División

- Linares
- Algeciras
- Palencia
- Rayo Vallecano

Promoted from Tercera División

- Pontevedra
- Orihuela
- Marbella
- Manacor
- Levante
- Barcelona Aficionados

== Group I ==
=== Teams ===
Teams from Andorra, Aragon, Asturias, Basque Country, Castile and León, Catalonia, Galicia and Navarre.

Location of teams in Segunda División B Gr. 1 1984–85

Team	Founded	Home city	Stadium
Alavés	1921	Vitoria-Gasteiz, Basque Country	Mendizorrotza
Andorra	1957	Andorra, Aragon	Juan Antonio Endeiza
FC Andorra	1942	Andorra la Vella, Andorra	Comunal
Arosa	1945	Vilagarcía de Arousa, Galicia	A Lomba
Real Avilés Industrial	1903	Avilés, Asturias	Muro de Zaro
Barcelona Aficionados	1967	Barcelona, Catalonia	Mini Estadi
Binéfar	1922	Binéfar, Aragon	El Segalar
Compostela	1962	Compostela, Galicia	Santa Isabel
Deportivo Aragón	1958	Zaragoza, Aragon	Ciudad Deportiva del Real Zaragoza
Erandio	1915	Erandio, Basque Country	Nuevo Ategorri
Figueres	1919	Figueres, Catalonia	L'Alfar
Gimnàstic de Tarragona	1886	Tarragona, Catalonia	Nou Estadi
Lleida	1939	Lleida	Camp d'Esports
Osasuna Promesas	1962	Pamplona, Navarre	Tajonar
Palencia	1960	Palencia, Castile and León	La Balastera
Pontevedra	1941	Pontevedra, Galicia	Pasarón
San Sebastián	1951	San Sebastián, Basque Country	Atotxa
Sestao	1916	Sestao, Basque Country	Las Llanas
Sporting Atlético	1960	Gijón, Asturias	Mareo
Zamora	1968	Zamora, Castile and León	Ramiro Ledesma

=== League table ===
Pos	Team	Pld	W	D	L	GF	GA	GD	Pts	Promotion or relegation
1	Sestao SC	38	23	9	6	59	28	+31	55	Promoted to Segunda División
2	Dep. Aragón	38	23	8	7	56	31	+25	54	Promoted to Segunda División
3	Dep. Alavés	38	19	12	7	70	38	+32	50	
4	Endesa Andorra	38	16	14	8	51	38	+13	46	
5	UE Figueras	38	13	15	10	65	50	+15	41	
6	UE Lleida	38	15	12	11	51	45	+6	42	
7	Pontevedra CF	38	12	17	9	56	41	+15	41	
8	CD Binéfar	38	15	10	13	49	40	+9	40	
9	FC Andorra	38	13	12	13	51	57	−6	38	
10	Sporting Atlético	38	12	12	14	43	48	−5	36	
11	Zamora CF	38	15	6	17	41	54	−13	36	
12	Palencia CF	38	13	10	15	47	46	+1	36	
13	Gim. Tarragona	38	13	9	16	41	44	−3	35	
14	Arosa SC	38	12	11	15	44	52	−8	35	
15	SD Compostela	38	9	16	13	41	55	−14	34	
16	Barcelona Aficionados	38	11	11	16	54	62	−8	33	
17	San Sebastián CF	38	10	13	15	41	47	−6	33	
18	Osasuna Promesas	38	11	8	19	42	55	−13	30	Relegated to Tercera División
19	Real Avilés Ind.	38	8	13	17	47	62	−15	29	Relegated to Tercera División
20	Club Erandio	38	4	8	26	38	94	−56	16	Relegated to Tercera División

Source: BDFútbol

=== Results ===
Home \ Away	ALV	AND	FCA	ARO	AVI	BAR	BIN	COM	DAR	ERA	FIG	GIM	LLE	OSA	PAL	PNT	SSE	SES	SPO	ZAM
Alavés	—	1–1	4–2	1–1	3–0	1–0	3–1	1–0	3–1	6–0	0–1	2–0	1–1	1–0	0–0	3–3	1–0	2–0	3–0	0–1
Andorra	1–4	—	1–2	3–0	1–0	3–2	2–1	0–0	0–1	2–1	1–1	3–0	3–0	3–3	4–1	0–0	1–2	1–0	2–0	1–0
FC Andorra	1–1	1–1	—	3–2	0–1	3–2	2–2	1–0	0–1	1–1	1–0	1–3	2–2	1–0	2–2	0–0	4–1	1–0	2–1	4–0
Arosa	2–1	1–1	2–0	—	1–1	6–3	1–0	2–3	0–0	4–3	2–1	0–0	1–1	2–0	3–0	1–0	0–2	1–0	2–1	1–0
Real Avilés Ind.	2–5	2–2	0–1	1–1	—	6–0	0–2	1–1	2–3	2–2	2–2	3–2	1–2	3–1	2–0	1–1	2–1	1–1	1–2	0–1
Barcelona Aficionados	3–1	0–0	2–2	2–1	1–3	—	3–1	0–1	0–0	4–0	3–0	2–0	4–0	0–2	1–2	3–0	3–0	1–1	2–2	1–1
Binéfar	2–4	2–0	3–0	2–0	1–0	4–1	—	4–0	2–0	2–1	2–0	1–1	0–0	3–2	1–2	1–1	2–1	1–0	0–0	2–1
Compostela	1–1	0–0	2–1	3–2	1–0	2–2	0–0	—	3–4	2–0	2–2	2–1	0–3	2–1	0–0	1–1	2–2	1–1	1–1	7–1
Deportivo Aragón	0–0	1–1	3–0	3–1	2–1	1–0	1–0	2–0	—	2–0	0–1	2–1	1–0	4–1	3–2	3–0	2–1	0–0	2–1	1–0
Erandio	3–3	1–2	1–2	1–0	2–1	1–1	1–1	3–0	1–4	—	1–1	0–1	2–3	1–0	0–3	0–3	1–1	2–3	1–1	4–5
Figueres	2–2	2–1	2–2	2–0	10–2	2–3	2–1	2–0	0–0	3–0	—	1–1	1–1	2–0	2–1	3–0	2–1	2–3	2–1	0–1
Gimnàstic	3–1	0–1	2–1	2–0	3–2	0–1	2–0	2–2	1–2	1–0	2–2	—	1–0	2–1	2–1	1–0	1–1	0–1	1–1	2–1
Lleida	2–1	2–2	1–0	1–1	1–1	1–1	1–0	0–0	1–2	7–0	2–0	1–1	—	2–1	3–1	2–0	2–0	1–3	3–1	2–1
Osasuna Promesas	1–3	0–2	4–3	0–0	2–1	0–0	2–0	1–0	0–3	3–1	2–2	1–0	0–2	—	0–1	0–0	0–0	3–0	4–1	1–0
Palencia	0–1	0–2	0–1	3–0	1–0	3–0	1–1	5–0	1–1		2–2	1–0	2–0	1–1	—	0–0	1–0	1–1	1–2	0–1
Pontevedra	0–3	4–0	1–1	3–3	0–0	1–1	1–1	2–0	3–0	6–0	3–3	2–1	4–0	3–1	1–0	—	1–1	2–2	5–0	1–0
San Sebastián	1–1	0–1	2–1	0–0	0–0	2–0	1–0	0–0	0–0	5–0	2–3	2–1	2–0	0–0	2–2	1–1	—	0–1	1–4	3–1
Sestao	1–0	1–0	5–0	3–0	0–0	2–1	2–1	2–0	1–0	4–1	0–0	1–0	2–1	4–2	2–0	3–0	3–0	—	1–1	2–0
Sporting Atlético	0–0	1–1	1–1	1–0	2–1	5–0	0–1	1–1	1–0	2–1	2–1	0–0	0–0	0–2	3–2	1–0	0–1	0–1	—	3–0
Zamora	1–2	1–1	1–1	1–0	1–1	2–1	1–1	3–1	2–1	1–0	1–1	1–0	2–0	2–0	1–2	0–3	3–2	1–2	1–0	—

Source: BDFútbol
Legend: Blue = home team win; Yellow = draw; Red = away team win.

=== Top goalscorers ===
Goalscorers	Goals	Team
(Spain) Ramón Masqué	20	Gimnàstic de Tarragona
(Spain) Ángel Giménez	18	Binéfar
(Spain) Javier García Barrio	18	Arosa
(Spain) Roberto Elvira	17	Deportivo Aragón
(Spain) Ernesto Valverde	16	Alavés

=== Top goalkeepers ===
Goalkeeper	Goals	Matches	Average	Team
(Spain) Manuel Ruiz	23	34	0.74	Deportivo Aragón
(Spain) Francisco Javier Echevarría	28	36	0.78	Sestao
(Spain) José Luis Artigas	35	36	0.97	Andorra
(Spain) Paco Rodríguez	35	35	1.00	Pontevedra
(Spain) Roberto Quintín	39	37	1.05	Binéfar

== Group II ==
Teams from Andalusia, Balearic Islands, Castilla–La Mancha, Catalonia, Ceuta, Extremadura, Madrid and Valencian Community.

=== Teams ===
Location of teams in Segunda División B Gr. 2 1984–85

Team	Founded	Home city	Stadium
Albacete	1940	Albacete, Castilla–La Mancha	Carlos Belmonte
Alcalá	1923	Alcalá de Henares, Madrid	El Val
Alcoyano	1928	Alcoy, Valencian Community	El Collao
Algeciras	1909	Algeciras, Andalusia	El Mirador
Antequerano	1939	Antequera, Andalusia	El Maulí
Badajoz	1905	Badajoz, Extremadura	Vivero
Ceuta	1970	Ceuta	Alfonso Murube
Hospitalet	1957	L'Hospitalet de Llobregat, Catalonia	Municipal de Deportes
Real Jaén	1929	Jaén, Andalusia	La Victoria
Levante	1909	Valencia, Valencian Community	Nou Estadi Llevant
Linares	1961	Linares, Andalusia	Linarejos
Linense	1912	La Línea de la Concepción, Andalusia	Municipal La Línea de la Concepción
Manacor	1923	Manacor, Balearic Islands	Na Capellera
Marbella	1947	Marbella, Andalusia	Municipal de Marbella
Orihuela	1944	Orihuela, Valencian Community	Los Arcos
Parla	1973	Parla, Madrid	Los Prados
Poblense	1935	Sa Pobla, Balearic Islands	Nou Camp Sa Pobla
Rayo Vallecano	1924	Vallecas, Madrid	Vallecas
Talavera	1948	Talavera de la Reina, Castilla–La Mancha	El Prado
Xerez	1947	Jerez de la Frontera, Andalusia	Domecq

=== League table ===
Pos	Team	Pld	W	D	L	GF	GA	GD	Pts	Promotion or relegation
1	AD Rayo Vallecano	38	19	12	7	57	39	+18	50	Promoted to Segunda División
2	Albacete Balompié	38	18	11	9	47	29	+18	47	Promoted to Segunda División
3	Algeciras CF	38	15	17	6	40	25	+15	47	
4	Balompédica Linense	38	17	13	8	54	38	+16	47	
5	Orihuela Deportiva	38	14	17	7	46	32	+14	45	
6	Xerez CD	38	14	15	9	39	30	+9	43	
7	Real Jaén	38	15	10	13	45	36	+9	40	
8	CD Alcoyano	38	17	6	15	48	44	+4	40	
9	Linares CF	38	14	12	12	43	43	0	40	
10	AgD Ceuta	38	14	10	14	42	41	+1	38	
11	Levante UD	38	13	11	14	54	47	+7	37	
12	CD Hospitalet	38	11	13	14	45	52	−7	35	
13	Talavera CF	38	12	11	15	34	40	−6	35	
14	UD Poblense	38	10	14	14	35	41	−6	34	
15	AD Parla	38	12	9	17	37	46	−9	33	
16	RSD Alcalá	38	10	13	15	30	47	−17	33	
17	CD Manacor	38	12	8	18	39	42	−3	32	
18	Atlético Marbella	38	11	9	18	38	48	−10	31	Relegated to Tercera División
19	CD Badajoz	38	10	10	18	40	50	−10	30	Relegated to Tercera División
20	CD Antequerano	38	8	7	23	26	69	−43	23	Relegated to Tercera División

Source: BDFutbol

=== Results ===
Home \ Away	ALB	ALA	ALC	ALG	ANT	BAD	CEU	HOS	JAE	LEV	LNR	LNS	MAN	MAR	ORI	PAR	POB	RAY	TAL	XER
Albacete	—	0–1	2–2	1–0	2–0	1–1	3–1	0–0	3–2	2–4	1–0	2–0	2–0	4–0	1–1	1–0	1–0	1–2	2–0	1–0
Alcalá	0–0	—	2–1	2–2	1–1	1–0	0–0	2–0	0–2	0–1	1–0	0–0	1–0	2–1	0–0	1–1	1–1	4–1	0–1	1–0
Alcoyano	0–2	2–1	—	2–2	4–0	3–1	3–1	2–1	2–1	2–1	0–1	1–0	3–0	3–0	1–1	1–0	3–1	1–1	0–2	2–2
Algeciras	1–0	6–0	1–0	—	1–0	1–0	3–1	1–0	2–1	2–2	1–1	0–0	0–2	3–0	0–0	2–1	0–0	1–1	1–0	0–0
Antequerano	0–2	1–1	1–0	0–0	—	1–0	2–1	0–1	0–4	2–1	0–0	2–1	1–1	0–3	0–2	2–0	2–0	1–3	2–0	0–0
Badajoz	1–1	0–0	2–1	3–0	4–1	—	0–1	0–2	2–1	3–2	2–0	2–2	2–1	2–0	2–2	0–1	1–1	2–3	0–1	1–1
Ceuta	2–1	1–1	3–1	0–0	3–1	0–1	—	1–0	1–0	1–0	1–1	1–0	4–1	2–2	1–0	1–2	1–0	1–3	4–1	3–0
Hospitalet	3–3	2–0	1–1	0–2	3–1	1–1	0–0	—	2–1	4–4	3–1	2–2	1–0	1–0	3–6	1–1	2–1	0–0	1–0	1–3
Jaén	1–0	4–1	1–0	1–2	1–0	2–0	1–0	1–0	—	0–1	1–1	4–1	0–0	0–1	1–1	1–2	1–0	2–2	1–0	2–1
Levante	1–1	3–0	1–0	0–0	3–0	2–0	1–1	1–1	0–2	—	3–1	0–0	0–0	2–0	2–2	2–1	2–3	1–1	4–1	2–0
Linares	1–1	1–1	0–1	1–0	4–1	2–1	2–0	2–0	1–1	2–1	—	1–1	1–0	3–0	1–0	3–2	1–1	0–2	1–0	4–1
Linense	1–0	1–0	2–0	0–0	4–1	3–2	2–0	3–1	2–0	3–2	4–1	—	0–0	1–1	0–0	1–0	3–1	1–0	3–0	2–0
Manacor	0–1	3–0	0–1	0–0	3–0	2–0	1–0	4–2	0–1	2–1	1–0	5–2	—	2–1	1–1	0–2	2–0	0–2	0–0	1–3
Atlético Marbella	0–1	3–1	2–1	1–1	2–0	0–0	1–0	0–0	1–0	3–0	0–1	1–2	2–0	—	2–4	1–0	2–2	1–3	5–0	1–1
Orihuela	1–1	1–0	1–2	1–0	2–1	1–0	1–1	0–3	3–0	1–0	3–0	1–1	2–1	1–0	—	2–0	4–0	0–0	1–1	0–0
Parla	1–0	2–1	0–1	1–1	2–1	1–2	1–2	1–1	1–1	1–1	2–0	2–1	0–3	1–0	0–0	—	2–0	2–2	1–2	0–2
Poblense	1–1	2–0	2–0	0–1	3–1	3–1	1–1	2–0	0–0	2–1	0–0	1–2	1–1	2–0	0–0	0–0	—	2–0	2–0	0–0
Rayo Vallecano	0–1	1–0	1–0	2–2	0–0	2–1	2–0	3–2	2–2	2–1	3–1	3–2	1–0	1–1	2–0	1–2	2–0	—	0–2	0–1
Talavera	0–1	1–2	0–1	1–0	5–0	3–0	0–0	0–0	1–1	1–0	1–1	0–0	3–2	0–0	3–0	2–0	0–0	1–3	—	1–1
Xerez	1–0	1–1	4–0	0–1	2–0	0–0	2–1	2–0	0–0	0–1	2–2	1–1	1–0	1–0	1–0	3–1	2–0	0–0	0–0	—

Source: BDFútbol
Legend: Blue = home team win; Yellow = draw; Red = away team win.

=== Top goalscorers ===
Goalscorers	Goals	Team
(Spain) Luis Cebada	15	Algeciras
(Spain) Argimiro Márquez	15	Linense
(Spain) Loren	14	Rayo Vallecano
(Spain) Ramón Hernández	13	Alcoyano
(Spain) Tomás Gibert	13	Poblense

=== Top goalkeepers ===
Goalkeeper	Goals	Matches	Average	Team
(Spain) Juano	15	30	0.50	Algeciras
(Spain) Ignacio Galindo	24	31	0.77	Jaén
(Spain) Juan Recio	29	37	0.78	Xerez
(Spain) José Garmendia	29	37	0.78	Albacete
(Spain) Goyo	25	30	0.83	Orihuela
