= Endika Guarrotxena =

Spanish footballer

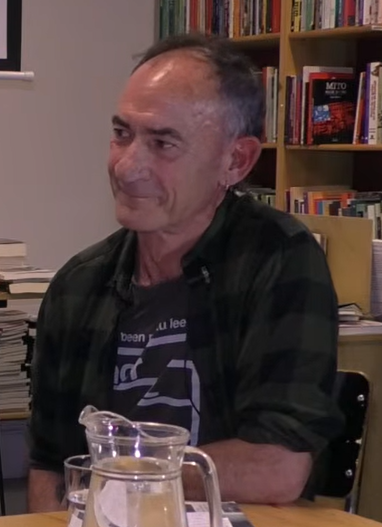

Personal information
- Full name: Endika Guarrotxena Arzubiaga
- Date of birth: 26 October 1961 (age 65)
- Place of birth: Bilbao, Spain
- Position: Forward

Youth career
- Getxo
- Athletic Bilbao

Senior career*
Years	Team	Apps	(Gls)
1979–1981	Bilbao Athletic	24	(10)
1980–1987	Athletic Bilbao	113	(15)
1982–1983	→ Ceuta (loan)		
1987–1988	Real Valladolid	24	(3)
1988–1989	Mallorca	15	(2)
1989–1990	Hércules	26	(7)
1990–1991	Benidorm	32	(4)

International career
1981	Spain U19	4	(3)
1984	Spain U21	2	(0)

Managerial career
- 2011–2013: Getxo
- * Club domestic league appearances and goals

Endika Guarrotxena Arzubiaga (born 26 October 1961), usually known mononymously as Endika, is a Spanish former professional footballer who played as a forward.

His career was associated primarily with Athletic Bilbao, winning the national championship in 1984 as well as the Copa del Rey, in which he scored the winning goal in the final. He also featured in La Liga for Real Valladolid.

He later served a spell as manager of amateur club CD Getxo.

== Playing career ==
=== Athletic Bilbao ===
Born in Bilbao, Biscay, Basque Country, Endika was a graduate of Athletic Bilbao's youth system. He made his senior debut with the reserve team, Bilbao Athletic, in the regionalised third tier during 1979–80. Midway through his second campaign, he made his league debut for the Athletic senior team on 30 November 1980, a 4–1 defeat away to Real Sociedad, scoring a late consolation goal for his side.

He was promoted at the start of the following campaign, but only made seven league appearances and three in the Copa Del Rey, usually appearing from the bench or himself being substituted. Under coach Javier Clemente, Athletic were beginning were one of the most successful periods in club history, in which they were champions of Spain in 1982–83 and 1983–84 before finishing third in the next two seasons. Endika missed the first of those league wins, having been loaned back to the third tier to play for AD Ceuta for the whole of 1982–83.

On his return to Bilbao, he began to feature more regularly and appeared 23 times as they retained the championship. He played and scored in the second leg of the 1983 Supercopa de España which Athletic lost on aggregate to FC Barcelona, and featured in six matches during the run to the 1984 Copa del Rey Final including both legs of the semi-final in which Athletic overcame Real Madrid C.F. on penalties. He was then selected to start the final against Barcelona, and scored what would be the only goal of the match in the 14th minute with a left-footed shot. However, his achievement was overshadowed in the reporting of the match due to the violent scenes after the final whistle between both sets of players. Athletic were awarded the Supercopa automatically the following year having won the double, and at the end of the season they reached the 1985 Copa del Rey Final, this time losing 2–1 to Atlético Madrid – Endika was brought on as a substitute with his team chasing a two-goal deficit.

In 1986–87, Endika posted his best figures for Athletic (30 league matches, completing 90 minutes in half of those), benefitting from a serious injury to fellow forward José María Noriega. However, he only scored five goals, with his final appearance for the club being a 2–1 win away to UD Las Palmas on 20 June 1987.

=== Later years ===
In summer 1987, Endika signed for top division side Real Valladolid, making 24 league appearances but scoring only three time and falling out of favour towards the end of the season. He moved on to second tier RCD Mallorca, playing less often – 626 minutes from 15 matches, two goals – but helping the club achieve promotion in 4th place.

Endika again moved clubs that summer, returning to the Spanish mainland and dropping down to Segunda B to play for Hércules CF. In Alicante he featured regularly, but the club finished only 13th, and he transferred to neighbours Benidorm CF who had been 5th in the same group. In his final season as a professional, Endika made 32 appearances and scored 4 goals as Benidorm achieved a respectable 10th place.

=== International ===
As an emerging player at Athletic Bilbao, Endika was selected for Spain Under-19 in 1981, and later played two matches for the Under-21s in 1984. He was never selected for the senior team.

== Coaching career ==
Endika studied in sports medicine while still playing, and after retiring he became a physical education teacher at an ikastola in Sopelana, as well as a football coach. He had a spell as manager of amateurs CD Getxo (his childhood club as a player), taking over in 2011 after previously coaching its youth teams and winning promotion from the Biscay División de Honor to the Tercera División (regionalised fourth tier) at the first attempt, with his son Markel among the players. However the club were relegated back on the final matchday of the 2012–13 season after rivals SD Balmaseda won their fixture.

== Personal life ==
Endika is the uncle of footballer Iker Guarrotxena, who also came through the ranks at Athletic Bilbao but played professionally for teams such as CD Mirandés.

He has been involved in politics, favouring left-wing organisations such as EH Bildu (a coalition of Basque nationalist parties); in 2012, he coached one of the teams in an Athletic Bilbao vs Real Sociedad veterans match for the benefit of ETA prisoners.

He is the uncle of Spanish and European Champion, the surfer Leticia Canales.

== Honours ==
Athletic Bilbao

- La Liga: 1983–84
- Copa del Rey: 1983–84
  - Runner-up: 1984–85

Spain Under-21

- UEFA Under-21 European Championship runner-up: 1984
