= Linares CF =

Spanish football club

Linares
- Full name: Linares Club de Fútbol
- Nickname: Azulillos (Little Blues)
- Founded: 1961
- Dissolved: 1990 (29 years)
- Ground: Linarejos, Linares, Andalusia, Spain
- Capacity: 10,000
- Chairman: N/A
- Manager: Josu Ortuondo
- League: 2ªB - Group 3
- 1989–90: 2ªB - Group 3, 7th
Home colours	Away colours

Linares Club de Fútbol was a Spanish football club based in Linares, Jaén, in the autonomous community of Andalusia. Founded in 1961, it was disbanded 29 years later due to serious financial problems, and held home matches at Estadio de Linarejos, with a 10,000-seat capacity.

== History ==
Founded in 1961, Linares reached the national leagues four years later. It would eventually play five seasons in the second division, four of those consecutive (1980–84), never finishing higher than 12th. From 1962 to 1967, the club competed under the name Santana Linares Club de Fútbol.

After being relegated in the 1983–84 season, Linares played five out of its last six years in Segunda División B – created in 1977 as the new third level. Following the team's disappearance another club was founded in the city, CD Linares: in its 19 years of existence it appeared in seven seasons in the fourth division and eight in the third (seven consecutive), before folding in 2009.

== Seasons ==
Season	Tier	Division	Place	Copa del Rey
1962–1965	4	Regional	—	
1965–66	3	3ª	11th	
1966–67	3	3ª	7th	
1967–68	3	3ª	5th	
1968–69	3	3ª	11th	
1969–70	3	3ª	10th	
1970–71	4	1ª Reg.	1st	
1971–72	3	3ª	16th	First round
1972–73	3	3ª	1st	Third round
1973–74	2	2ª	20th	Third round
1974–75	3	3ª	3rd	First round
1975–76	3	3ª	4th	Second round
1976–77	3	3ª	4th	Second round

Season	Tier	Division	Place	Copa del Rey
1977–78	3	2ª B	14th	Third round
1978–79	3	2ª B	9th	First round
1979–80	3	2ª B	1st	Second round
1980–81	2	2ª	12th	Second round
1981–82	2	2ª	15th	Third round
1982–83	2	2ª	14th	Third round
1983–84	2	2ª	17th	Round of 32
1984–85	3	2ª B	9th	First round
1985–86	3	2ª B	14th	
1986–87	4	3ª	1st	
1987–88	3	2ª B	6th	Round of 16
1988–89	3	2ª B	3rd	First round
1989–90	3	2ª B	7th	

- 5 seasons in Segunda División
- 8 seasons in Segunda División B
- 11 seasons in Tercera División
- 4 seasons in Categorías Regionales

== Famous players ==
- (Argentina) Roberto Romero
- (Argentina) Horacio Agostinelli
- (Argentina) Ricardo Martínez
- (Argentina) Omar Sánchez
- (Argentina) Mario Véner
- (Croatia) Stjepan Milardović
- (Germany) Wolfgang Koch
- (Spain) Antonio Vara
- (Spain) Adriano Cano
- (Spain) Manuel Preciado
- (Spain) Víctor Celso
- (Spain) Rafael Benítez
- (Spain) Manuel Mesa
- (Spain) Francisco Pariente
- (Spain) Manuel Toledano
- (Spain) Peio Agirreoa
- (Spain) José Luis Sarabia
- (Spain) Juan De Ramos
