= Vicente Campillo =

Spanish football manager (born 1951)

Personal information
- Full name: Vicente Carlos Campillo Candel
- Date of birth: 22 April 1951 (age 75)
- Place of birth: Santomera, Spain

Youth career
- Murcia

Senior career*
Years	Team	Apps	(Gls)
- Murcia B

Managerial career
- 1978–1979: Santomera
- 1979–1980: Molinense
- 1982–1983: Muleño
- 1983–1984: Torrevieja
- 1984–1985: Murcia B
- 1985–1986: Murcia
- 1987–1988: Córdoba
- 1989–1990: Orihuela Deportiva
- 1990–1992: Hércules
- 1993: Murcia
- 1995: Extremadura
- 1996–1997: Écija
- 1997–1998: Murcia
- 1999: Xerez
- 2000–2001: Cacereño
- 2002: Linares
- 2004: Cartagena
- 2006: Algeciras
- 2006: Orihuela
- * Club domestic league appearances and goals

Vicente Carlos Campillo Candel (born 22 April 1951) is a retired Spanish football player and manager.

== Career ==
Born in Santomera, Region of Murcia, Campillo's career as a player ended prematurely due to a knee injury. In 1984, he became manager of Real Murcia's reserves and, late into the season, as the first team had already been virtually relegated from La Liga, he replaced Eusebio Ríos at the helm of the latter, going on to achieve promotion the following campaign, as champions.

Campillo was fired in early October 1986, following a 3–1 away loss against Real Betis. He was one of three coaches during that season, where the team ranked 11th after both the regular season and the second stage.

After leaving the Estadio de La Condomina, with the exception of three incomplete spells in Segunda División (being relegated with Murcia in 1994 and Écija Balompié in 1997) Campillo worked exclusively in the lower leagues. His last job was at Orihuela CF, where he was in charge until 20 November 2006.
