= Iker Guarrotxena =

Spanish footballer

Personal information
- Full name: Iker Guarrotxena Vallejo
- Date of birth: 6 December 1992 (age 33)
- Place of birth: Bilbao, Spain
- Height: 1.77 m (5 ft 10 in)
- Position: Forward

Team information
- Current team: Badajoz

Youth career
- 2002–2003: Arenas Getxo
- 2003–2011: Athletic Bilbao

Senior career*
| Years | Team | Apps | (Gls) |
| 2011–2012 | Basconia | 29 | (10) |
| 2012–2016 | Bilbao Athletic | 92 | (22) |
| 2014–2015 | → Tenerife (loan) | 20 | (1) |
| 2016–2017 | Mirandés | 40 | (9) |
| 2017–2018 | Cultural Leonesa | 33 | (0) |
| 2018–2020 | Pogoń Szczecin | 30 | (5) |
| 2018–2020 | Pogoń Szczecin II | 4 | (2) |
| 2020–2021 | Volos | 21 | (1) |
| 2021 | Western United | 22 | (3) |
| 2021–2022 | Logroñés | 38 | (14) |
| 2022–2023 | Goa | 20 | (11) |
| 2023–2024 | Real Murcia | 10 | (2) |
| 2024 | Mumbai City | 6 | (3) |
| 2024–2025 | Goa | 21 | (7) |
| 2025–2026 | Persijap Jepara | 15 | (4) |
| 2026– | Badajoz | 0 | (0) |
- * Club domestic league appearances and goals as of 9:10, 29 August 2026 (UTC)

Iker Guarrotxena Vallejo (born 6 December 1992) is a Spanish professional footballer who plays as a forward for Tercera Federación club Badajoz.

== Club career ==
=== Athletic Bilbao ===
Born in Bilbao, Biscay, Guarrotxena joined Athletic Bilbao's youth setup in 2002, aged nine. Notably, his uncle, Endika Guarrotxena, had also played for Bilbao, having made 113 appearances for the club's senior team from 1980 to 1987. Iker made his senior debut with CD Basconia in the 2011–12 season, in the Tercera División. In the 2012 summer, he was promoted to the reserves in the Segunda División B.

=== SD Tenerife ===
On 1 August 2014, Guarrotxena moved to Segunda División's CD Tenerife in a season-long loan deal. He played his first match as a professional on the 24th, starting in a 0–1 away loss against SD Ponferradina.

=== Return and release from Bilbao ===
Guarrotxena returned to the B-side for the 2015–16 season, with the club also in the second tier. On 7 June 2016, after suffering relegation, he was released by the Lions.

=== CD Mirandes ===
On 12 July 2016, Guarrotxena signed a two-year deal with CD Mirandés, also in the second tier.

=== Cultural y Deportiva Leonesa ===
Roughly one year later, after Mirandes suffered relegation, he moved to fellow league team Cultural y Deportiva Leonesa.

=== Pogoń Szczecin ===
On 4 August 2018, Guarrotxena moved to Pogoń Szczecin in the Polish Ekstraklasa, signing a three-year deal with the club.

=== Volos ===
On 2 January 2020, Greek Super League club Volos officially announced the signing of Guarrotxena on a free transfer.

=== Western United FC ===
On 14 January 2021, A-League club Western United FC officially announced that Guarrotxena had signed on a one-year deal with the club.

=== FC Goa ===
In June 2022, Guarrotxena moved to Indian Super League, after signing with Peña who managed FC Goa. He scored his first goal for the club in a 3–0 win against Jamshedpur FC. On 8 July 2023, Guarrotxena mutually terminated his Goa contract a year before its expiry, citing personal reasons for his early departure.

=== Real Murcia ===
On June 7, 2023, Real Murcia CF confirmed that Guarrotxena had signed for the club on a one-year deal, until the end of the 2023-24 season.

=== Mumbai City FC ===
Following the early termination of his Real Murcia CF contract, Guarrotxena was snapped up by Mumbai City FC on a 6-month deal until the end of the 2023-24 season. He made his debut for the club off the bench in the 56th minute, at home against Jamshedpur FC in an eventual 2–3 loss. Guarrotxena scored his first goal for The Islanders away against East Bengal in the 24th minute of the match, picking up an Alberto Noguera pass and turning to score into the bottom corner. In the Islanders' next game at home versus Bengaluru FC, he assisted Vikram Partap Singh for his towering back post header in the 58th minute, allowing him to complete a brace in a match that ended in a 2–0 win.

Continuing this rich vein of form, he contributed an assist to Bipin Singh's second goal in the following game away against Chennaiyin FC in another 0–2 win. While he failed to put up a goal contribution versus former club FC Goa at home, he scored a brilliant brace away versus Punjab FC, scoring the equalizer and the eventual winning goal in a thrilling 2-3 comeback victory. However, as he scored the winner, Guarrotxena went down injured, and after attempting to come back onto the pitch, went to ground again and had to be substituted. Mumbai City FC confirmed that the injury was season-ending for Guarrotxena.

=== Badajoz ===
Following a second stint at Goa and a stint at Indonesian side Persijap Jepara, Guarrotxena returned to Spain, signing for Badajoz.

== Personal life ==
He is the nephew of retired footballer Endika, who also came through the ranks at Athletic Bilbao and won trophies with the club in the 1980s.

== Career statistics ==
As of match played 23 May 2026

Appearances and goals by club, season and competition
| Club | Season | League | | | National cup (Note: Includes Copa del Rey, Polish Cup, Greek Cup, Super Cup) | | Continental | | Total | |
| Club | Season | Division | Apps | Goals | Apps | Goals | Apps | Goals | Apps | Goals |
|---|---|---|---|---|---|---|---|---|---|---|
| Basconia | 2011–12 | Tercera División | 29 | 10 | 0 | 0 | — | | 29 | 10 |
| Bilbao Athletic | 2012–13 | Segunda División B | 24 | 6 | 0 | 0 | — | | 24 | 6 |
| Bilbao Athletic | 2013–14 | Segunda División B | 34 | 11 | 0 | 0 | — | | 34 | 11 |
| Bilbao Athletic | 2015–16 | Segunda División | 34 | 5 | 0 | 0 | — | | 34 | 5 |
| Bilbao Athletic | Total | | 92 | 22 | 0 | 0 | 0 | 0 | 92 | 22 |
| Tenerife (loan) | 2014–15 | Segunda División | 20 | 1 | 1 | 0 | — | | 21 | 1 |
| Mirandés | 2016–17 | Segunda División | 40 | 9 | 1 | 1 | — | | 41 | 10 |
| Cultural Leonesa | 2017–18 | Segunda División | 33 | 0 | 2 | 0 | — | | 35 | 0 |
| Pogoń Szczecin | 2018–19 | Ekstraklasa | 24 | 5 | 0 | 0 | — | | 24 | 5 |
| Pogoń Szczecin | 2019–20 | Ekstraklasa | 6 | 0 | 2 | 0 | — | | 8 | 0 |
| Pogoń Szczecin | Total | | 30 | 5 | 2 | 0 | 0 | 0 | 32 | 5 |
| Pogoń Szczecin II | 2018–19 | III liga | 2 | 2 | — | | — | | 2 | 2 |
| Pogoń Szczecin II | 2019–20 | III liga | 2 | 0 | — | | — | | 2 | 0 |
| Pogoń Szczecin II | Total | | 4 | 2 | — | | — | | 4 | 2 |
| Volos | 2019–20 | Super League Greece | 14 | 1 | 2 | 2 | — | | 16 | 3 |
| Volos | 2020–21 | Super League Greece | 7 | 0 | 0 | 0 | — | | 7 | 0 |
| Volos | Total | | 21 | 1 | 2 | 2 | 0 | 0 | 23 | 3 |
| Western United | 2020–21 | A-League | 22 | 3 | 0 | 0 | — | | 22 | 3 |
| Logroñés | 2021–22 | Primera División RFEF | 38 | 14 | 1 | 0 | — | | 39 | 14 |
| Goa | 2022–23 | Indian Super League | 20 | 11 | 3 | 2 | — | | 23 | 13 |
| Real Murcia | 2023–24 | Primera Federación | 10 | 2 | 1 | 0 | — | | 11 | 2 |
| Mumbai City | 2023–24 | Indian Super League | 6 | 3 | 0 | 0 | — | | 6 | 3 |
| Goa | 2024–25 | Indian Super League | 21 | 7 | 4 | 4 | — | | 25 | 11 |
| Goa | 2025–26 | Indian Super League | 0 | 0 | 3 | 0 | 5 (Note: Appearances in AFC Champions League Two) | 0 | 8 | 0 |
| Goa | Total | | 21 | 7 | 7 | 4 | 5 | 0 | 33 | 11 |
| Persijap Jepara | 2025–26 | Super League | 15 | 4 | 0 | 0 | — | | 15 | 4 |
| Career total | | | 401 | 94 | 20 | 9 | 5 | 0 | 426 | 103 |

== Honours ==
Individual

- Indian Super League Hero of the Month: December 2022
