= Josu Ortuondo =

Spanish football player/manager

Personal information
- Full name: Jesús María Sáenz Ortuondo
- Date of birth: 6 November 1951 (age 74)
- Place of birth: Ondarroa, Spain
- Height: 1.64 m (5 ft 5 in)
- Position: Winger

Youth career
- Athletic Bilbao

Senior career*
Years	Team	Apps	(Gls)
1969–1971	Bilbao Atlético	10	(7)
1969–1973	Athletic Bilbao	49	(5)
1973–1974	Logroñés	13	(1)
1974–1980	Oviedo	115	(28)
1980–1982	Atlético Español		
1982–1983	Lorca Deportiva	19	(2)
1983–1984	Córdoba	30	(2)

Managerial career
- 1984–1986: Córdoba
- 1987: Poli Almería
- 1988–1989: Linares
- 1989–1990: Atlético Madrileño
- 1991–1994: Extremadura
- 1994–1995: Badajoz
- 1995–1997: Extremadura
- 1997–1998: Rayo Vallecano
- 1998: Rayo Vallecano
- 1999: Salamanca
- 1999–2002: Extremadura
- 2002–2003: Córdoba
- 2003–2004: Algeciras
- 2005–2007: Extremadura
- 2008: Palencia
- * Club domestic league appearances and goals

Jesús María Sáenz "Josu" Ortuondo (born 6 November 1951) is a Spanish retired footballer who played as a right winger, and a manager.

== Playing career ==
Born in Ondarroa, Biscay, Basque Country, Ortuondo was an Athletic Bilbao youth graduate. On 14 September 1969, before even having appeared for the reserves, he made his first team – and La Liga – debut, coming on as a second-half substitute for José Argoitia in a 2–0 home win against RCD Mallorca.

Ortuondo scored his first goal in the main category of Spanish football on 5 October 1969, netting his team's second in a 2–3 away loss against FC Barcelona. He would move back to the B-side in the second level for the remainder of the season, which ended in relegation.

After starting the 1970–71 campaign with seven goals in only ten appearances for the B's, Ortuondo was promoted to the main squad in November 1970. Despite being a part of the main squad, he never established as a starter, and left the club in 1973 for CD Logroñés in Tercera División.

In 1974, Ortuondo moved to Segunda División side Real Oviedo, appearing rarely in the club's promotion campaign. He appeared regularly afterwards, as the club suffered two relegations and achieved one promotion in 1979; in that season, he scored a career-best 12 goals.

In 1980, Ortuondo moved abroad and joined Atlético Español FC in Mexico. In 1982, after the club's dissolution, he returned to his home country and subsequently represented CF Lorca Deportiva and Córdoba CF in Segunda División B, retiring with the latter in 1984 at the age of 33.

== Coaching career ==
Immediately after retiring Ortuondo took up coaching, taking over last club Córdoba which was recently relegated to the fourth division. After achieving promotion with the side, he left in 1986 and was subsequently in charge of CP Almería and Linares CF also in the third level.

Ortuondo was named manager of Atlético Madrid's reserves ahead of the 1989–90 season, in the second division. He was dismissed when the club's relegation was confirmed, and spent a year without a club before taking over CF Extremadura in the third tier.

Promoted to the second division in 1994, Ortuondo left Extremadura for CD Badajoz, but was dismissed in May of the following year. He subsequently returned to the Azulgranas, achieving promotion to the top tier but being immediately relegated afterwards.

On 3 July 1998, Ortuondo was appointed in charge of Rayo Vallecano in the second division. He was relieved from his duties the following 9 March, being replaced by Máximo Hernández, but was reinstated as manager six days later.

Ortuondo left Rayo as the club appointed Juande Ramos in charge, remaining unemployed until 11 January 1999, when he was named manager of UD Salamanca in the top tier. In July, he returned to Extremadura for a third spell, with the club in division two.

Ortuondo was relieved from his duties on 7 April 2002, and returned to Córdoba in June. Dismissed the following 20 January, he was appointed in charge of Algeciras CF on 28 November, but was sacked from the latter club in March 2004.

In June 2005, Ortuondo started his fourth period at Extremadura, now in division three. He resigned in January 2007 due to the club's severe financial crisis. In March of the following year, he took the reins of CF Palencia, severely threatened with relegation, but could not avoid the drop.
