= Manuel Lozano Garrido =

Spanish Roman Catholic journalist and author

Blessed Manuel Lozano Garrido
- Born: 9 August 1920; Linares, Jaén, Kingdom of Spain
- Died: 3 November 1971 (aged 51); Linares, Jaén, Francoist Spain
- Venerated in: Roman Catholic Church
- Beatified: 12 June 2010, Linares, Spain by Cardinal Angelo Amato (on behalf of Pope Benedict XVI)
- Feast: 3 November

Blessed Manuel Lozano Garrido (9 August 1920 – 3 November 1971) was a Spanish Roman Catholic journalist and author. He was nicknamed "Lolo". On 12 June 2010 he was beatified. He remains as a patron of journalists.

== Life ==
Manuel Lozano Garrido was born in Linares on 9 August 1920; he had seven brothers and one sister named Lucía.

In 1936 when the Spanish Civil War broke out his father had died and he lived with his seven brothers and his sister. Manuel took on the task of distributing the Eucharist among the villagers until he was arrested. At the age of 22 he became a soldier but still left every morning to go to Mass. He began suffering from spondylitis and left his position as a soldier due to ill health;on the following year, he was paralysed in full.

Although Manuel lived the rest of his life in a wheelchair and in near-constant pain, he successfully pursued a career as a journalist, writing hundreds of articles for several publications. He also wrote nine books, which he dedicated to his sister Lucía. He maintained a fierce dedication to the Eucharist; he received permission from his local bishop to have an altar in his house so he could go to Mass, and he placed his typewriter in front of the Eucharist when he worked to place it under the protection and guidance of Jesus Christ.

In 1956 he founded the magazine "Sinai" for the sick people. In 1958 he travelled with his sister to Lourdes. In 1962 he lost his sight but continued his writing.

He died in 1971 at the age of 51.

== Beatification ==
On 19 December 2009, Pope Benedict XVI authorized the recognition of a miracle attributed to Manuel's intercession in the cure of Rogelio de Haro Sagra (aged two) in 1972; the child had suffered from multiple organ failure due to Gram-negative sepsis.

He was beatified in Linares on 12 June 2010. Archbishop Angelo Amato presided over the celebration on the behalf of the pontiff. He is the first journalist to be beatified.
