= Algeciras CF =

Algeciras
- Full name: Algeciras Club de Fútbol
- Nickname: Rojiblancos
- Founded: 7 June 1909; 117 years ago
- Stadium: Nuevo Mirador
- Capacity: 7,200
- President: Mac Lackey
- Head coach: Adrián Colunga
- League: Primera Federación – Group 2
- 2025–26: Primera Federación – Group 2, 8th of 20
- Website: algecirasclubdefutbol.com
Home colours	Away colours

Algeciras Club de Fútbol is a Spanish football team based in Algeciras, in the autonomous community of Andalusia. Founded in 1909 it plays in Primera Federación – Group 2, holding home matches at Estadio Nuevo Mirador.

== History ==
Football became of interest in Algeciras at the end of the 19th century from the British colony of Gibraltar. In their early years the teams of the city played in several sand fields around the city; one of these provisional camps was located near the fairgrounds of the city El Calvario. This field was the first in where Algeciras CF played its matches. The club was officially founded in 1909.

When the club was founded, it did not have an official t-shirt, so they played with the players own clothes. But when they started to play very often, they decided that it was the moment to use new and exclusive equipment. In that moment, it was very difficult to get sport equipment, so some people who worked for the club, went to Gibraltar looking for t-shirts. They chose a red and white t-shirt that belonged to an English team called Southampton Football Club. In that moment, the team played in different sand pitches near the city. El Polvorín or El Calvario were some of them,

In 1956, the club merged with UD España to form España de Algeciras CF before switching back to Algeciras CF in the following year. After this, the club played between the fourth and third tiers many years, including some declines to regional categories, with three promotions to the Second Division in 1978, 1983 and 2003.

Algeciras moved to Estadio Nuevo Mirador in 1999, where it has played since.

In 2008, Algeciras was relegated administratively to Primera Andaluza for failing to pay their debts.

== Season to season ==
Season	Tier	Division	Place	Copa del Rey
1941–42	3	1ª Reg.	4th	
1942–43	3	1ª Reg.	8th	
1943–44	3	3ª	7th	Third round
1944–45	3	3ª	8th	
1945–46	3	3ª	10th	
1946–47	3	3ª	6th	
1947–48	3	3ª	9th	Second round
1948–49	3	3ª	7th	First round
1949–50	3	3ª	10th	
1950–51	3	3ª	15th	
1951–52	3	3ª	8th	
1952–53	3	3ª	4th	
1953–54	3	3ª	8th	
1954–55	3	3ª	2nd	
1955–56	3	3ª	1st	
1956–57	2	2ª	18th	
1957–58	3	3ª	6th	
1958–59	3	3ª	3rd	
1959–60	3	3ª	2nd	
1960–61	3	3ª	4th	

Season	Tier	Division	Place	Copa del Rey
1961–62	3	3ª	1st	
1962–63	3	3ª	2nd	
1963–64	2	2ª	8th	First round
1964–65	2	2ª	10th	First round
1965–66	2	2ª	3rd	First round
1966–67	2	2ª	15th	First round
1967–68	3	3ª	3rd	
1968–69	3	3ª	9th	
1969–70	3	3ª	14th	First round
1970–71	4	Reg. Pref.	2nd	
1971–72	4	Reg. Pref.	4th	
1972–73	4	Reg. Pref.	5th	
1973–74	4	Reg. Pref.	1st	
1974–75	3	3ª	11th	First round
1975–76	3	3ª	5th	Second round
1976–77	3	3ª	7th	Second round
1977–78	3	2ª B	2nd	Second round
1978–79	2	2ª	16th	First round
1979–80	2	2ª	20th	Third round
1980–81	3	2ª B	4th	First round

Season	Tier	Division	Place	Copa del Rey
1981–82	3	2ª B	6th	Second round
1982–83	3	2ª B	2nd	Second round
1983–84	2	2ª	18th	First round
1984–85	3	2ª B	3rd	First round
1985–86	3	2ª B	19th	First round
1986–87	5	Reg. Pref.	2nd	
1987–88	4	3ª	1st	
1988–89	3	2ª B	18th	
1989–90	4	3ª	4th	
1990–91	4	3ª	7th	First round
1991–92	4	3ª	4th	First round
1992–93	4	3ª	17th	Second round
1993–94	5	Reg. Pref.	3rd	
1994–95	5	Reg. Pref.	2nd	
1995–96	4	3ª	14th	
1996–97	4	3ª	3rd	
1997–98	4	3ª	4th	
1998–99	3	2ª B	16th	First round
1999–2000	4	3ª	1st	
2000–01	3	2ª B	16th	Round of 64

Season	Tier	Division	Place	Copa del Rey
2001–02	3	2ª B	13th	
2002–03	3	2ª B	1st	
2003–04	2	2ª	22nd	Round of 32
2004–05	3	2ª B	6th	Round of 64
2005–06	3	2ª B	19th	Preliminary round
2006–07	4	3ª	1st	
2007–08	3	2ª B	20th	Second round
2008–09	5	1ª And.	1st	
2009–10	4	3ª	15th	
2010–11	4	3ª	5th	
2011–12	4	3ª	6th	
2012–13	4	3ª	1st	
2013–14	3	2ª B	16th	Round of 32
2014–15	4	3ª	1st	
2015–16	3	2ª B	18th	Second round
2016–17	4	3ª	4th	
2017–18	4	3ª	3rd	
2018–19	4	3ª	4th	
2019–20	3	2ª B	16th	
2020–21	3	2ª B	1st / 3rd	

Season	Tier	Division	Place	Copa del Rey
2021–22	3	1ª RFEF	7th	First round
2022–23	3	1ª Fed.	15th	
2023–24	3	1ª Fed.	13th	
2024–25	3	1ª Fed.	9th	
2025–26	3	1ª Fed.	8th	
2025–26	3	1ª Fed.	8th	
2026–27	3	1ª Fed.		

- 9 seasons in Segunda División
- 7 seasons in Primera Federación/Primera División RFEF
- 18 seasons in Segunda División B
- 44 seasons in Tercera División

== Current squad ==
As of 4 November 2026.

Note: Flags indicate national team as defined under FIFA eligibility rules; some limited exceptions apply. Players may hold more than one non-FIFA nationality.

No.	Pos.	Nation	Player
1	GK	ESP	Iván Moreno
2	DF	ESP	Fran Carmona
3	DF	ESP	Joseca Márquez
4	DF	ESP	Aleix Coch
5	DF	ESP	Ángel Gómez
6	MF	ESP	Óscar Castro
7	FW	ESP	Juanma
8	MF	ESP	Iván Turrillo
9	FW	ESP	Raúl Rubio
10	MF	ESP	Dani Garrido
11	DF	ESP	Tomás Sánchez

No.	Pos.	Nation	Player
13	GK	FRA	Tao Paradowski (on loan from Ibiza)
14	MF	ECU	Diego Almeida
15	DF	ESP	Víctor Ruiz
17	MF	ESP	Javier Avilés
18	FW	ESP	Pau Martínez
19	MF	ESP	Diego Iglesias
20	MF	ESP	Jony Álamo
21	MF	ESP	Toni Ramon
22	DF	ESP	Paris Adot
23	MF	ESP	Joe Riley
29	FW	ESP	Enri Herrero

=== Reserve team ===
Note: Flags indicate national team as defined under FIFA eligibility rules; some limited exceptions apply. Players may hold more than one non-FIFA nationality.

No.	Pos.	Nation	Player
26	MF	ESP	Jairo Rubio

== Former players ==
see Category:Algeciras CF footballers

== Former coaches ==
- (Spain) Vicente Campillo
- (Spain) Josu Ortuondo
- (Spain) Manuel Ruiz
- (Spain) Jordi Vinyals

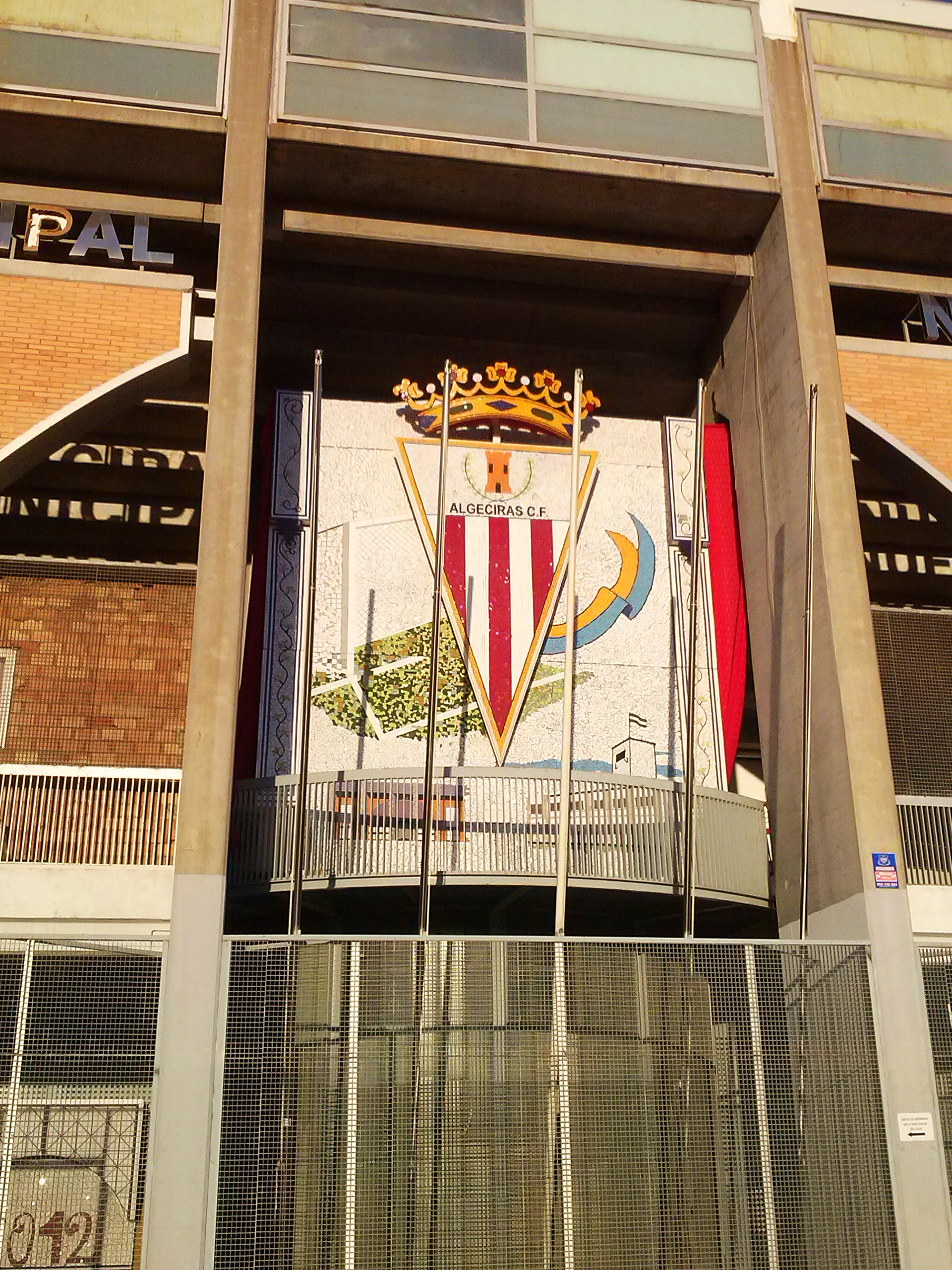

== Stadium ==
Estadio Nuevo Mirador seats 7,500 spectators. Its opening took place in 1999, with a friendly with Real Betis. Previously, the team played in "El Mirador" that was in the city center, and its opening took place in 1954.

== Home kit ==
Algeciras' main uniform consists of red-and-white stripes shirt, blue shorts and red socks. The kit was adopted from Southampton in England, being chosen from different English kits that were brought to a shop in Gibraltar, as this type of gear was not available in the area at the time.
