= CD Antequerano =

Spanish football club

Antequerano
- Full name: Club Deportivo Antequerano
- Founded: 1939
- Dissolved: 1992
- Ground: El Maulí
- Capacity: 7,000
- 1991–92: Regional Preferente - Málaga, 16th of 18
Home colours	Away colours

Club Deportivo Antequerano was a football club based in Antequera, Andalusia. The club came to play 4 seasons in Segunda División B. Club Deportivo Antequerano disappears in 1992.

In 1992, CD Antequerano merges with CD Puerto Malagueño to form current Antequera CF, a name Antequerano also held between 1962 and 1970.

== Season to season ==
Season	Tier	Division	Place	Copa del Rey
1940–41	4	1ª Reg.	3rd	
1941–42	3	1ª Reg.	2nd	
1942–43	3	1ª Reg.	9th	
1943–44	4	1ª Reg.		
1944–45	5	2ª Reg.		
1945–46	4	1ª Reg.		
1946–47	3	3ª	7th	
1947–48	3	3ª	13th	Fifth round
1948–49	4	1ª Reg.	7th	
1949–50	4	1ª Reg.	6th	
1950–51	4	1ª Reg.		
1951–52	4	1ª Reg.	8th	
1952–53	4	1ª Reg.	17th	
1953–54	4	1ª Reg.	4th	
1954–55	3	3ª	9th	
1955–56	3	3ª	7th	
1956–57	3	3ª	8th	
1957–58	3	3ª	12th	
1958–59	3	3ª	10th	
1959–60	3	3ª	13th	

Season	Tier	Division	Place	Copa del Rey
1960–61	3	3ª	13th	
1961–62	3	3ª	7th	
1962–63	3	3ª	3rd	
1963–64	3	3ª	5th	
1964–65	3	3ª	8th	
1965–66	3	3ª	14th	
1966–67	4	1ª Reg.		
1967–68	4	1ª Reg.		
1968–69	4	1ª Reg.	3rd	
1969–70	5	2ª Reg.		
1970–71	5	2ª Reg.		
1971–72	4	1ª Reg.	10th	
1972–73	4	1ª Reg.	7th	
1973–74	4	1ª Reg.	4th	
1974–75	4	1ª Reg.	12th	
1975–76	5	1ª Reg.	6th	
1976–77	5	1ª Reg.	2nd	
1977–78	5	Reg. Pref.	9th	
1978–79	5	Reg. Pref.	3rd	
1979–80	4	3ª	15th	Second round

Season	Tier	Division	Place	Copa del Rey
1980–81	4	3ª	1st	
1981–82	3	2ª B	4th	First round
1982–83	3	2ª B	4th	First round
1983–84	3	2ª B	18th	First round
1984–85	3	2ª B	20th	
1985–86	4	3ª	9th	

Season	Tier	Division	Place	Copa del Rey
1986–87	4	3ª	12th	
1987–88	4	3ª	14th	
1988–89	4	3ª	15th	
1989–90	4	3ª	17th	
1990–91	4	3ª	19th	
1991–92	5	Reg. Pref.	16th	

- 4 seasons in Segunda División B
- 22 seasons in Tercera División
