= Stjepan Milardović =

Croatian footballer (born 1953)

Personal information
- Date of birth: 17 November 1953 (age 72)
- Place of birth: Split, SR Croatia, Yugoslavia
- Position: Forward

Senior career*
Years	Team	Apps	(Gls)
1976–1977	SpVgg Bayreuth	19	(9)
1977–1979	FC St. Pauli	41	(4)
1979–1980	FV Würzburg 04	32	(6)
1980–1983	Linares	68	(17)
1984–1985	Tenerife	30	(9)
1985–1987	RNK Split	21	(2)
Total		211	(47)
- * Club domestic league appearances and goals

Stjepan "Stipe" Milardović (born 17 November 1953), also known as Milo in Spain, is a Croatian former professional footballer who played as a forward.
