= Manuel Preciado =

Spanish footballer (1957–2012)

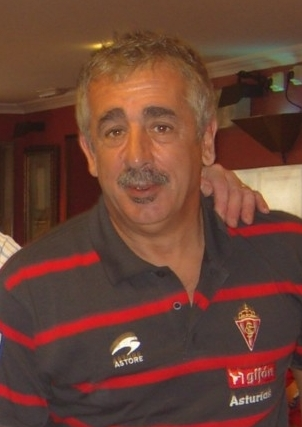
- Preciado with Sporting Gijón

Personal information
- Full name: Manuel Preciado Rebolledo
- Date of birth: 28 August 1957
- Place of birth: El Astillero, Spain
- Date of death: 6 June 2012 (aged 54)
- Place of death: El Perelló, Spain
- Height: 1.75 m (5 ft 9 in)
- Position: Defender

Youth career
- 1974–1977: Racing Santander

Senior career*
Years	Team	Apps	(Gls)
1977–1982	Racing Santander	115	(2)
1982–1984	Linares	68	(0)
1984–1985	Mallorca	13	(0)
1985–1986	Alavés	37	(1)
1986–1990	Ourense	132	(1)
1990–1992	Gimnástica	64	(3)
Total		429	(7)

Managerial career
- 1995–1996: Gimnástica
- 1996–1997: Racing B
- 2000: Gimnástica
- 2001–2002: Racing B
- 2002–2003: Racing Santander
- 2003–2004: Levante
- 2004: Murcia
- 2005–2006: Racing Santander
- 2006–2012: Sporting Gijón
- 2012: Villarreal
- * Club domestic league appearances and goals

Manuel "Manolo" Preciado Rebolledo (28 August 1957 – 6 June 2012) was a Spanish football defender and manager.

His 15-year career was mainly associated with Racing de Santander, and he also represented five other teams, mostly in the lower leagues. As a manager, he also coached with his main club but worked mostly with Sporting de Gijón, promoting to La Liga in 2008.

Preciado died in June 2012 at the age of 54, from a heart attack.

== Playing career ==
Born in El Astillero, Cantabria, Preciado appeared in 59 La Liga matches for local Racing de Santander, split between three of his five-year spell with the club. His best-ever in the top flight was 32 games in the 1978–79 season, which ended in relegation.

After three years in Segunda División (two of them with Linares CF), Preciado resumed his career in the lower leagues, eventually retiring in 1992 with lowly Gimnástica de Torrelavega also in his native region, at nearly 35. He scored his only goal in the top tier on 18 April 1982, but in a 4–1 away loss against Athletic Bilbao.

== Coaching career ==
Preciado took up coaching in the mid-90s precisely with his last team, leading it to the Tercera División championship. Being then recalled by Racing to be in charge of the reserves, two other promotions to Segunda División B befell, in 1997 and 2002.

Preciado was called for first-team coaching duties in 2002–03's top division, helping them to eventually retain their status in his 18 games in charge but submitting his resignation after the purchase of the club by Dmitry Piterman, given the intention of the businessman to act as coach. After second-tier spells with Levante UD – with promotion – and Real Murcia, he returned to Santander. Although the side finished just one point above the relegation zone, they managed a 2–1 away win over Real Madrid on 21 December 2005.

In the summer of 2006, Preciado switched to Sporting de Gijón. In his second season he managed to lead the Asturians to the top flight after ten years. Subsequently, he avoided relegation with the lowest budget of all 20 teams after a 2–1 home defeat of Recreativo de Huelva in the last round on 31 May 2009, renewing his contract later that year.

Preciado again led Sporting into safety in the 2009–10 campaign (15th place). In November 2010, after resting almost his entire starting XI for a fixture against FC Barcelona two months earlier, eventually losing 1–0 away, he was accused by Real Madrid manager José Mourinho of throwing the match, and responded by calling the Portuguese a "bad colleague" and a "scumbag". After the war of words, they met at the El Molinón on the 14th, with the visitors winning 1–0. On 2 April 2011, at the Santiago Bernabéu, Sporting won by the same scoreline, becoming the first side in nine years to defeat Mourinho in a league match at home, with Preciado later commenting that "Mourinho entered our dressing room and congratulated us".

On 31 January 2012, after nearly six years in charge, Preciado was dismissed following a 5–1 away loss to Real Sociedad and with Sporting ranking 19th in the league.

== Personal life ==
Preciado's wife died from cancer in 2002. Two years later, his 15-year-old son (one of two the couple had) was killed in a car crash. He later claimed about the incidents: "I could have shot myself or I could have carried on".

On 20 April 2011, Preciado's father, also named Manuel, died after being run over in Santander.

== Death and reaction ==
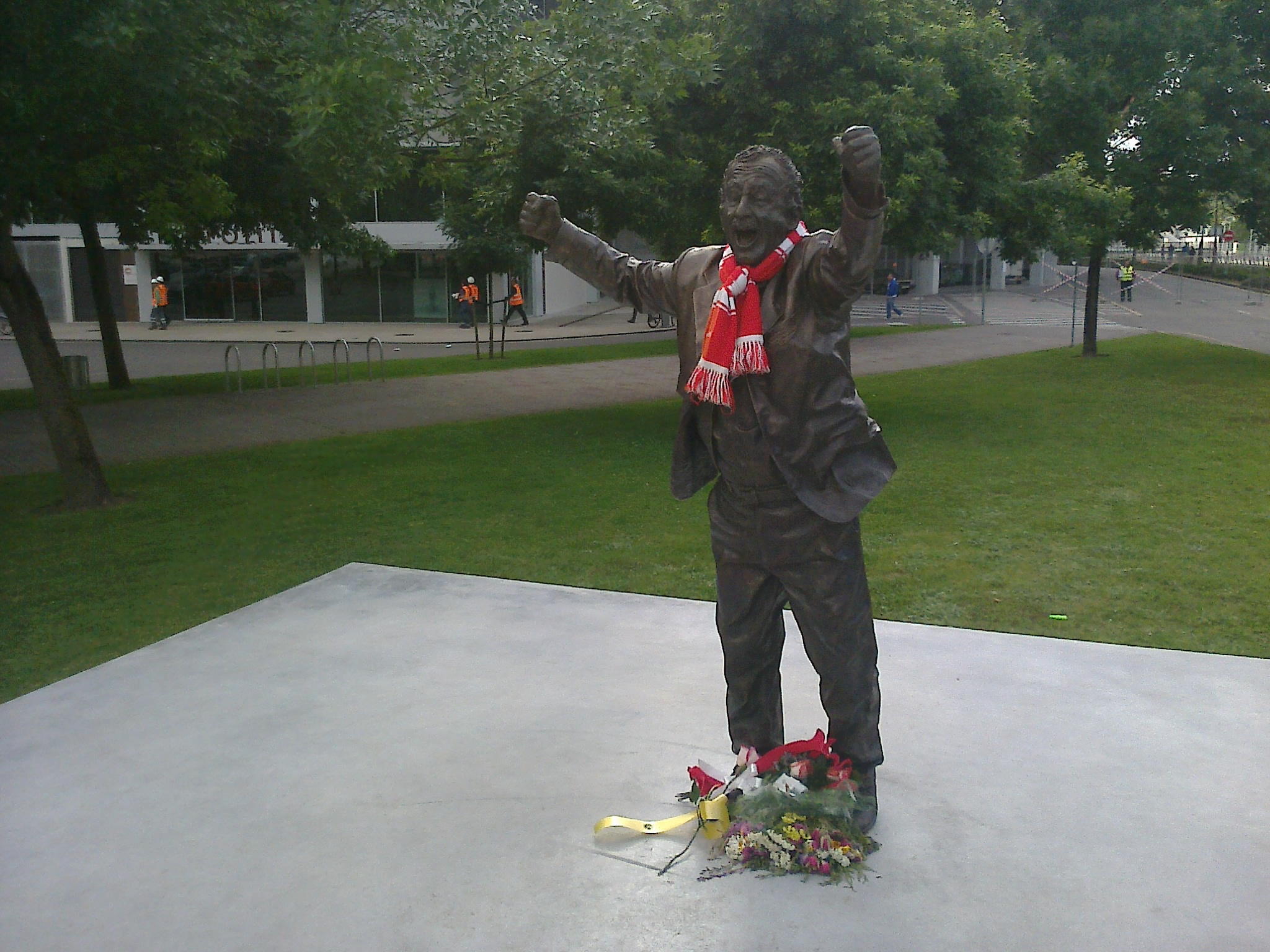
Statue of Preciado, near El Molinón.

On 6 June 2012, Preciado was appointed at Villarreal CF who, as Sporting had, suffered relegation at the season's end. Later in that day, he was found dead in an hotel in the Valencian Community from a heart attack. He was reportedly a chain-smoker, consuming 40 cigarettes a day.

According to the Associated Press, "Preciado's sudden death led to an outpouring of emotional responses from Spanish clubs, coaches and players." Spain national team manager Vicente del Bosque, in Poland to prepare for UEFA Euro 2012, told Spanish sports daily Marca "We are all shocked. We were having breakfast and we were all taken back by the news. He was a caring person and a great sportsman. He was a man of football that was an honor to coaching." Team member Juan Mata said, "The truth is that this is difficult to digest. I always remember him smiling, as a happy person that transmitted his passion, joy and character to all his teams. Talking about him in the past tense is tough for me." Mourinho issued an open letter on Real Madrid's official website, saying in part that "He had everything I like in people and sportsmen: character, honesty and the courage to fight on." Joaquín Caparrós, manager at RCD Mallorca, said "I was so happy for him joining Villarreal. I am sure he would have taken it back to the first division. He should be a reference in the world of coaching."

In Gijón, many people met at Estadio El Molinón, the home ground of Sporting, in order to pay their respects. The same day, the city Mayor announced she would make a proposal to name a street close to the stadium "Alameda de Manuel Preciado".

On 7 June 2013, one year after Preciado's death, a bronze statue was inaugurated near El Molinón, with the funds being arranged through popular donations.

== Managerial statistics ==
Managerial record by team and tenure
Team	Nat	From	To	Record								Ref
Team	Nat	From	To	G	W	D	L	GF	GA	GD	Win %	Ref
Gimnástica	(Spain)	30 June 1995	1 July 1996	44	29	11	4	94	20	+74	65.91	
Racing B	(Spain)	1 July 1996	30 June 1997	44	23	14	7	89	40	+49	52.27	
Gimnástica	(Spain)	1 July 2000	1 August 2000	0	0	0	0	0	0	+0	—	—
Racing B	(Spain)	5 February 2001	30 June 2002	58	32	12	14	112	42	+70	55.17	
Racing Santander	(Spain)	1 July 2002	20 January 2003	19	6	2	11	22	27	−5	31.58	
Levante	(Spain)	11 July 2003	30 June 2004	46	25	13	8	64	36	+28	54.35	
Murcia	(Spain)	1 July 2004	23 November 2004	14	2	3	9	9	24	−15	14.29	
Racing Santander	(Spain)	1 July 2005	23 April 2006	35	7	13	15	29	42	−13	20.00	
Sporting Gijón	(Spain)	1 July 2006	31 January 2012	232	79	55	98	267	321	−54	34.05	
Villarreal	(Spain)	6 June 2012	6 June 2012	0	0	0	0	0	0	+0	—	
Total				492	203	123	166	686	552	+134	41.26	—

== Honours ==
=== Manager ===
Levante

- Segunda División: 2003–04

Individual

- Miguel Muñoz Trophy (Segunda División): 2007–08
