= 1982–83 Segunda División B =

Season of third division football in Spain

Segunda División B
- Season: 1982–83
- Champions: Bilbao Athletic; Granada CF
- Promoted: Bilbao Athletic; Granada CF; CD Tenerife; Algeciras CF
- Relegated: Cultural Leonesa; CF Reus Deportivo; CD Fuengirola; CD San Fernando; AD Torrejón
- Matches: 760
- Goals: 1,724 (2.27 per match)
- Top goalscorer: Ricardo Arrien; Agustín Lasaosa (22 goals)
- Best goalkeeper: Vicente Gómez (0.44 goals/match)
- Biggest home win: Bilbao Athletic 8–0 Andorra (31 October 1982)
- Biggest away win: San Fernando 0–5 Albacete (9 January 1983)
- Highest scoring: Bilbao Athletic 8–0 Andorra (31 October 1982); Barakaldo 5–3 Andorra (6 March 1983)

The 1982–83 Segunda División B season was the 6th since its establishment. The first matches of the season were played on 4 September 1982, and the season ended on 22 May 1983.

The division consisted of two geographic groups. Bilbao Athletic were the Group I champions and Granada CF were the Group II champions.

== Overview before the season ==
40 teams joined the league, including one relegated from the 1981–82 Segunda División and 6 promoted from the 1981–82 Tercera División. The composition of the groups was determined by the Royal Spanish Football Federation, attending to geographical criteria.

Relegated from Segunda División

- Burgos CF

Promoted from Tercera División

- Albacete Balompié
- CD Binéfar
- AD Parla
- UD Poblense
- Osasuna Promesas
- CD Hospitalet

== Group I ==
=== Teams ===
Teams from Andorra, Aragon, Asturias, Basque Country, Canary Islands, Castile and León, Catalonia, Galicia and Navarre.

Location of teams in Segunda División B Gr. 1 1982–83
Canary Islands

Team	Founded	Home city	Stadium
Endesa Andorra	1957	Andorra, Aragon	Juan Antonio Endeiza
FC Andorra	1942	Andorra la Vella, Andorra	Camp d'Esports de les Valls
Barakaldo	1917	Barakaldo, Basque Country	Lasesarre
Bilbao Athletic	1964	Bilbao, Basque Country	Lezama
Binéfar	1922	Binéfar, Aragon	El Segalar
Burgos	1936	Burgos, Castile and León	El Plantío
Compostela	1962	Compostela, Galicia	Santa Isabel
Cultural Leonesa	1923	León, Castile and León	Antonio Amilivia
Erandio	1915	Erandio, Basque Country	Nuevo Ategorri
Gimnástico de Tarragona	1886	Tarragona, Catalonia	Nou Estadi
Huesca	1960	Huesca, Aragon	El Alcoraz
Lérida	1939	Lleida, Catalonia	Camp d'Esports
Logroñés	1940	Logroño, La Rioja	Las Gaunas
Osasuna Promesas	1962	Pamplona, Navarre	Tajonar
Racing de Ferrol	1919	Ferrol, Galicia	Manuel Rivera
Reus	1909	Reus, Catalonia	Camp Nou Reus
San Sebastián	1951	San Sebastián, Basque Country	Atotxa
Sestao	1916	Sestao, Basque Country	Las Llanas
Sporting Atlético	1960	Gijón, Asturias	Mareo
Tenerife	1912	Tenerife, Canary Islands	Heliodoro Rodríguez López

=== League table ===
Pos	Team	Pld	W	D	L	GF	GA	GD	Pts	Promotion or relegation
1	Bilbao Athletic	38	26	7	5	91	35	+56	59	Promoted to Segunda Divisiόn
2	CD Tenerife	38	23	6	9	75	35	+40	52	Promoted to Segunda Divisiόn
3	Burgos CF (Note: Burgos was dissolved at the end of the season)	38	19	9	10	61	31	+30	47	Dissolved
4	Sestao SC	38	19	8	11	56	38	+18	46	
5	Gimnástico de Tarragona	38	15	12	11	38	30	+8	42	
6	San Sebastián CF	38	15	11	12	37	35	+2	41	
7	CD Logroñés	38	13	14	11	44	35	+9	40	
8	Andorra FC	38	15	9	14	43	47	−4	39	
9	Racing Ferrol	38	14	11	13	45	48	−3	39	
10	UD Lérida	38	15	9	14	46	46	0	39	
11	SD Compostela	38	14	11	13	29	39	−10	39	
12	SD Huesca	38	14	9	15	42	45	−3	37	
13	Osasuna Promesas	38	11	12	15	35	42	−7	34	
14	Barakaldo CF	38	13	8	17	37	53	−16	34	
15	CD Endesa Andorra	38	13	7	18	49	66	−17	33	
16	Sporting Gijón Atlético	38	11	10	17	47	53	−6	32	
17	CD Binéfar	38	9	13	16	40	57	−17	31	
18	Club Erandio (Note: Erandio remained in Segunda División B due to the dissolution of Burgos)	38	9	13	16	28	42	−14	31	
19	Cultural Leonesa	38	10	8	20	34	52	−18	28	Relegated to Tercera División
20	CF Reus Deportivo	38	5	7	26	28	76	−48	17	Relegated to Tercera División

Source: BDFútbol

=== Results ===
Home \ Away	AND	FCA	BAR	BIL	BIN	BUR	COM	CUL	ERA	GIM	HUE	LLE	LOG	OSA	RFE	REU	SSE	SES	SPO	TEN
Endesa Andorra	—	3–0	2–1	1–1	2–0	0–0	0–0	2–0	1–0	3–2	2–0	0–0	1–1	3–1	2–0	2–2	1–3	2–0	2–0	2–3
FC Andorra	2–0	—	4–1	1–3	2–2	1–0	2–1	1–0	0–0	3–1	1–1	1–0	1–0	1–0	4–0	2–0	1–0	3–1	0–2	0–0
Barakaldo	5–3	3–2	—	0–3	2–0	0–0	2–1	1–0	1–0	0–2	1–1	2–1	2–0	0–0	2–0	1–0	1–4	2–3	2–1	1–4
Bilbao Athletic	8–0	4–0	2–1	—	2–1	1–1	3–1	2–0	4–0	3–0	3–0	0–2	2–1	3–1	4–0	2–0	3–0	4–2	2–1	3–0
Binéfar	2–1	2–1	0–0	4–4	—	1–4	0–3	2–2	2–2	0–0	4–1	1–1	1–1	1–2	1–1	2–0	1–1	1–2	1–0	0–3
Burgos	2–0	4–2	2–0	1–1	0–0	—	2–0	2–3	3–0	3–1	2–0	4–1	2–0	1–1	5–0	3–1	2–0	1–1	4–1	2–0
Compostela	2–0	0–0	1–0	1–1	2–1	1–0	—	2–1	1–0	1–0	1–0	0–1	0–0	1–0	0–0	2–0	0–1	1–0	1–1	3–0
Cultural Leonesa	2–1	2–0	2–0	0–2	3–1	1–2	0–0	—	1–1	0–0	0–1	2–0	1–2	2–0	0–2	3–0	1–0	0–0	0–0	1–3
Erandio	2–0	0–1	1–0	1–2	1–1	1–1	1–1	1–0	—	0–0	2–0	1–1	1–1	1–0	2–1	2–1	0–0	0–3	3–2	0–0
Gimn. Tarragona	2–1	0–1	0–0	1–0	0–0	0–1	4–0	2–1	0–0	—	1–1	2–0	1–0	2–0	3–1	1–0	2–1	1–0	3–0	2–1
Huesca	2–1	2–1	5–1	2–0	0–1	1–0	5–0	2–0	1–0	0–0	—	2–1	1–0	0–1	0–2	3–1	0–1	2–1	2–2	2–2
Lérida	4–1	1–1	4–1	1–4	2–0	1–0	1–0	0–2	3–1	1–1	2–2	—	1–1	0–1	1–1	1–1	2–0	2–1	2–1	2–1
Logroñés	2–1	3–0	0–0	1–3	1–2	0–0	2–0	2–0	1–0	1–0	2–0	0–3	—	2–0	3–0	1–1	1–1	1–1	1–1	4–0
Osasuna Promesas	3–3	2–2	1–0	1–1	1–2	3–0	1–1	0–0	1–0	2–0	2–0	1–2	2–2	—	1–1	0–0	0–3	0–0	1–0	1–2
Racing Ferrol	1–0	2–0	0–0	0–1	1–2	1–0	2–0	5–2	3–0	0–0	0–0	1–0	0–3	3–1	—	2–0	4–1	0–0	1–2	1–1
Reus	0–3	0–0	2–1	0–3	1–0	2–4	0–1	1–1	1–0	0–3	1–2	1–2	2–2	0–2	1–2	—	1–3	1–0	2–1	2–5
San Sebastián	2–0	1–1	0–0	1–0	1–0	0–3	0–0	4–0	1–0	0–0	1–0	1–0	1–0	0–1	1–1	1–0	—	1–1	0–0	0–2
Sestao	5–0	2–1	1–0	5–3	2–0	3–0	1–0	1–0	1–1	1–0	4–1	3–0	2–0	1–0	0–3	2–1	1–1	—	2–1	2–0
Sporting Atlético	1–2	2–0	1–2	1–2	3–1	1–0	1–1	1–0	0–3	2–2	0–0	2–0	1–2	1–1	1–1	7–1	3–1	2–1	—	1–0
Tenerife	5–0	1–0	0–1	2–2	2–0	1–0	6–0	6–1	2–0	2–0	1–0	3–0	0–0	1–0	4–2	4–1	2–0	2–0	4–0	—

Source: BDFútbol
Legend: Blue = home team win; Yellow = draw; Red = away team win.

=== Top goalscorers ===
Goalscorers	Goals	Team
(Spain) Ricardo Arrien	22	Bilbao Athletic
(Spain) Agustín Lasaosa	22	Tenerife
(Spain) Julio Salinas	21	Bilbao Athletic
(Spain) David Amaral	16	Tenerife
(Spain) Cholo	16	Burgos

=== Top goalkeepers ===
Goalkeeper	Goals	Matches	Average	Team
(Spain) Chuco	28	37	0.76	Burgos
(Spain) José Palomo	30	38	0.79	Gimnástico de Tarragona
(Spain) Agustín Elduayen	26	32	0.81	San Sebastián
(Spain) Peio Aguirreoa	27	32	0.84	Tenerife
(Spain) Patxi Iru	35	38	0.92	Bilbao Athletic

== Group II ==
Teams from Andalusia, Aragon, Balearic Islands, Castile and León, Castilla–La Mancha, Catalonia, Ceuta, Extremadura, Madrid, Region of Murcia and Valencian Community.

=== Teams ===
Location of teams in Segunda División B Gr. 2 1982–83

Team	Founded	Home city	Stadium
Albacete	1940	Albacete, Castilla–La Mancha	Carlos Belmonte
Alcalá	1923	Alcalá de Henares, Madrid	El Val
Alcoyano	1928	Alcoy, Valencian Community	El Collao
Algeciras	1909	Algeciras, Andalusia	El Mirador
Antequerano	1939	Antequera, Andalusia	El Maulí
Badajoz	1905	Badajoz, Extremadura	Vivero
Calvo Sotelo	1948	Puertollano, Castilla–La Mancha	Empetrol
Ceuta	1970	Ceuta	Alfonso Murube
Fuengirola	1931	Fuengirola, Andalusia	Santa Fe de los Boliches
Hospitalet	1957	L'Hospitalet de Llobregat, Catalonia	Municipal de Deportes
Granada	1931	Granada, Andalusia	Los Cármenes
Ibiza	1956	Ibiza, Balearic Islands	Carrer Canàries
Real Jaén	1929	Jaén, Andalusia	La Victoria
Lorca	1969	Lorca, Region of Murcia	San José
Parla	1973	Parla, Madrid	Los Prados
Poblense	1935	Sa Pobla, Balearic Islands	Nou Camp Sa Pobla
Portuense	1928	El Puerto de Santa María, Andalusia	José del Cuvillo
San Fernando	1940	San Fernando, Andalusia	Marqués de Varela
Talavera	1948	Talavera de la Reina, Castilla–La Mancha	El Prado
Torrejón	1953	Torrejón de Ardoz, Madrid	Las Veredillas

=== League table ===
Pos	Team	Pld	W	D	L	GF	GA	GD	Pts	Promotion or relegation
1	Granada CF	38	22	9	7	51	29	+22	53	Promoted to Segunda Divisiόn
2	Algeciras CF	38	18	14	6	37	21	+16	50	Promoted to Segunda Divisiόn
3	Albacete Balompié	38	20	10	8	50	24	+26	50	
4	CD Antequerano	38	18	11	9	49	28	+21	47	
5	RC Portuense	38	16	11	11	37	31	+6	43	
6	Talavera CF	38	15	11	12	49	38	+11	41	
7	CD Alcoyano	38	16	9	13	38	42	−4	41	
8	CD Badajoz	38	19	3	16	47	33	+14	41	
9	AgD Ceuta	38	13	13	12	51	37	+14	39	
10	AD Parla	38	13	13	12	39	39	0	39	
11	CF Lorca Deportiva	38	13	13	12	40	31	+9	39	
12	Real Jaén	38	14	10	14	41	40	+1	38	
13	CF Calvo Sotelo	38	14	10	14	47	47	0	38	
14	CD Hospitalet	38	12	14	12	44	46	−2	38	
15	UD Poblense	38	14	6	18	46	45	+1	34	
16	RSD Alcalá	38	9	12	17	31	44	−13	30	
17	SD Ibiza	38	11	7	20	29	47	−18	29	
18	CD Fuengirola	38	8	8	22	29	61	−32	24	Relegated to Tercera División
19	CD San Fernando	38	7	10	21	38	75	−37	24	Relegated to Tercera División
20	AD Torrejón	38	8	6	24	26	61	−35	22	Relegated to Tercera División

Source: BDFútbol

=== Results ===
Home \ Away	ALB	ALA	ALC	ALG	ANT	BAD	CAL	CEU	FUE	GRA	HOS	IBZ	JAE	LOR	PAR	POB	POR	SFE	TAL	TOR
Albacete	—	0–1	0–0	0–1	2–1	1–0	0–0	0–0	2–1	0–0	3–1	3–0	1–0	1–0	0–0	2–0	2–0	2–0	1–1	5–0
Alcalá	0–1	—	0–0	0–0	3–0	1–2	1–2	1–0	0–1	0–3	1–0	1–0	0–2	1–1	2–0	1–2	1–3	4–0	1–1	1–0
Alcoyano	2–0	1–1	—	0–1	1–0	1–0	1–2	3–2	1–0	2–1	1–1	3–1	1–0	1–0	0–0	4–1	1–2	4–3	0–0	2–0
Algeciras	0–0	0–0	1–0	—	1–0	2–2	2–0	1–0	2–0	0–0	1–0	2–0	1–0	1–1	3–0	0–0	0–0	1–1	0–1	2–0
Antequerano	2–0	2–0	5–1	1–1	—	2–0	1–1	3–1	3–1	5–2	1–0	2–0	1–0	0–0	0–0	2–1	1–0	3–1	0–0	1–0
Badajoz	1–2	1–0	1–0	0–2	2–0	—	4–0	2–0	1–0	3–0	1–1	1–0	4–1	1–0	1–0	1–0	2–3	7–0	0–2	2–0
Calvo Sotelo	1–2	3–0	0–0	4–0	1–1	3–1	—	0–0	3–1	1–2	2–1	1–0	0–1	0–1	2–0	2–0	2–1	4–2	2–0	3–1
Ceuta	1–2	4–3	0–0	1–4	1–1	2–1	2–1	—	2–0	0–0	1–1	1–2	1–0	2–1	5–0	3–0	3–0	4–0	5–0	1–0
Fuengirola	1–4	0–0	0–2	0–1	0–0	0–1	0–0	1–0	—	0–2	3–0	1–1	3–1	0–3	0–0	1–0	2–1	0–0	2–2	2–0
Granada	1–0	2–1	2–0	1–2	0–0	0–1	3–0	2–1	3–1	—	2–0	1–0	1–1	0–0	2–1	1–0	1–1	2–0	3–2	3–0
Hospitalet	2–1	1–1	3–1	0–0	1–0	1–0	0–0	1–1	3–1	2–2	—	3–1	2–2	1–0	1–1	2–2	1–0	1–0	0–3	5–1
Ibiza	0–2	1–0	1–2	0–0	1–3	2–0	1–1	1–1	1–1	2–0	1–0	—	2–1	1–0	2–1	2–0	0–2	1–1	2–1	2–0
Jaén	0–2	0–0	0–1	2–0	2–2	1–0	0–0	1–0	5–0	1–3	2–2	2–0	—	1–1	3–0	1–0	2–0	2–2	2–1	1–0
Lorca	3–0	1–1	0–0	1–0	0–3	1–0	4–2	1–1	3–0	0–1	3–1	1–0	0–0	—	0–1	2–0	0–1	3–0	2–2	1–1
Parla	0–0	2–0	2–0	0–0	1–2	0–1	3–1	0–0	2–0	0–0	3–2	4–1	3–0	1–1	—	0–0	2–0	2–1	3–1	3–1
Poblense	0–1	4–0	5–0	1–1	0–0	2–1	1–0	2–2	3–1	1–2	3–1	1–0	0–1	2–0	3–1	—	1–0	1–0	0–2	5–0
Racing Portuense	1–0	0–1	0–1	1–0	1–0	0–0	1–1	1–1	2–1	1–0	0–0	2–0	3–0	1–1	1–1	2–0	—	2–1	2–1	1–0
San Fernando	0–5	2–2	3–0	2–3	1–0	0–2	3–2	0–0	2–3	0–1	0–2	0–0	1–1	0–3	2–0	4–3	0–0	—	2–0	2–1
Talavera	1–1	0–0	2–0	0–1	1–0	2–0	5–0	1–0	2–0	0–1	1–1	1–0	1–0	4–0	1–2	0–2	1–1	2–0	—	2–0
Torrejón	2–2	2–1	2–1	2–0	0–1	1–0	1–0	0–2	3–1	0–1	0–1	1–0	1–2	0–1	0–0	2–0	0–0	2–2	2–2	—

Source: BDFútbol
Legend: Blue = home team win; Yellow = draw; Red = away team win.

=== Top goalscorers ===
Goalscorers	Goals	Team
(Spain) Juan José Camacho	21	Calvo Sotelo
(Spain) Manolito	15	Antequerano
(Spain) Juan Antonio Anquela	13	Real Jaén
(Spain) Jesús Ayúcar	12	Talavera
(Spain) Joan Golobart	12	Hospitalet

=== Top goalkeepers ===
Goalkeeper	Goals	Matches	Average	Team
(Spain) Vicente Gómez	13	29	0.45	Algeciras
(Spain) José Villalba Arana	24	38	0.63	Albacete
(Spain) Gregorio de Pablos	28	37	0.76	Antequerano
(Spain) Agapito Moncaleán	25	31	0.81	Lorca
(Spain) Alejandro Valero	29	33	0.88	Badajoz
