= 1983–84 Segunda División =

53rd season of the second-tier football league in Spain

Segunda División
- Season: 1983–84
- Champions: Castilla CF
- Promoted: Hércules CF; Racing de Santander; Elche CF
- Relegated: Linares CF; Algeciras CF; Palencia CF; Rayo Vallecano
- Matches: 380
- Goals: 923 (2.43 per match)
- Top goalscorer: (Spain) Julio Salinas

The 1983–84 Segunda División season saw 20 teams participate in the second flight Spanish league. Castilla CF, Real Madrid CF's reserve team, won the league.

Hércules CF, Racing de Santander and Elche CF were promoted to Primera División. Linares CF, Algeciras CF, Palencia CF and Rayo Vallecano were relegated to Segunda División B.

== Teams ==
Location of teams in Segunda División 1983-84
Canary Islands

Team	Home city	Stadium
Algeciras CF	Algeciras	El Mirador
Atlético Madrileño	Madrid	Vicente Calderón
Barcelona Atlètic	Barcelona	Mini Estadi
Bilbao Athletic	Bilbao	San Mamés
Cartagena FC	Cartagena	El Almarjal
CD Castellón	Castellón de la Plana	Castalia
Castilla CF	Madrid	Ciudad Deportiva
RC Celta de Vigo	Vigo	Balaídos
Deportivo La Coruña	A Coruña	Riazor
Elche CF	Elche	Nuevo Estadio
Granada CF	Granada	Los Cármenes
Hércules CF	Alicante	José Rico Pérez
UD Las Palmas	Las Palmas	Insular
Linares CF	Linares	Linarejos
Real Oviedo	Oviedo	Carlos Tartiere
Palencia CF	Palencia	La Balastera
Racing de Santander	Santander	El Sardinero
AD Rayo Vallecano	Madrid	Vallecas
Recreativo de Huelva	Huelva	Municipal
CD Tenerife	Santa Cruz de Tenerife	Heliodoro Rodríguez López

== Final table ==
Pos	Team	Pld	W	D	L	GF	GA	GD	Pts	Promotion or relegation
1	Castilla CF (Note: Castilla CF were ineligible for promotion as they were the reserve team of Real Madrid.)	38	19	12	7	69	47	+22	50	
2	Bilbao Athletic (Note: Bilbao Athletic were ineligible for promotion for as they were the reserve team of Athletic Bilbao.)	38	20	10	8	61	39	+22	50	
3	Hércules CF	38	16	13	9	46	35	+11	45	Promoted to Primera División
4	Racing de Santander	38	16	12	10	53	39	+14	44	Promoted to Primera División
5	Elche CF	38	16	11	11	64	40	+24	43	Promoted to Primera División
6	Celta de Vigo	38	15	12	11	45	36	+9	42	
7	Barcelona Atlètic	38	14	12	12	55	48	+7	40	
8	Granada CF	38	15	10	13	42	36	+6	40	
9	Deportivo de La Coruña	38	14	11	13	37	39	−2	39	
10	CD Castellón	38	14	9	15	45	57	−12	37	
11	UD Las Palmas	38	12	12	14	46	52	−6	36	
12	Recreativo de Huelva	38	12	12	14	32	48	−16	36	
13	Real Oviedo	38	13	9	16	44	49	−5	35	
14	Atlético Madrileño	38	12	10	16	64	63	+1	34	
15	CD Tenerife	38	11	12	15	45	49	−4	34	
16	Cartagena FC	38	9	15	14	35	46	−11	33	
17	Linares CF	38	11	10	17	39	55	−16	32	Relegated to Segunda División B
18	Algeciras CF	38	10	12	16	34	45	−11	32	Relegated to Segunda División B
19	Palencia CF	38	8	13	17	33	49	−16	29	Relegated to Segunda División B
20	Rayo Vallecano	38	7	15	16	34	51	−17	29	Relegated to Segunda División B

Source: BDFutbol

== Results ==
Home \ Away	ALG	ATM	BAR	BIL	CAR	CAS	CST	CEL	DEP	ELC	GRA	HÉR	LPA	LIN	OVI	PAL	RAC	RAY	REC	TEN
Algeciras	—	4–2	1–0	2–2	1–2	1–1	1–0	1–0	1–1	0–0	1–1	2–0	0–0	1–1	2–2	2–1	2–0	0–1	2–1	0–1
At. Madrileño	1–1	—	2–2	2–3	4–2	1–1	2–3	0–1	3–1	3–3	2–3	5–0	7–3	4–1	1–1	2–1	1–0	2–0	1–1	3–1
Barcelona At.	0–1	0–0	—	1–4	4–1	2–2	0–1	1–1	3–1	3–2	1–0	0–0	3–2	4–2	3–0	3–1	1–0	2–0	6–1	1–1
Bilbao Ath.	4–0	2–1	4–2	—	0–0	3–0	2–2	1–0	2–0	2–1	1–0	0–0	1–1	4–0	2–2	2–1	2–0	1–1	0–0	3–2
Cartagena	1–0	0–0	4–2	2–0	—	2–0	3–3	2–1	1–1	0–0	0–1	0–0	0–2	0–0	0–1	2–2	2–2	1–1	3–0	1–0
Castellón	1–0	1–0	2–1	1–0	1–2	—	2–0	2–0	0–0	1–3	1–0	1–1	3–1	2–1	0–2	1–1	1–1	2–2	2–2	1–0
Castilla	0–3	6–1	3–0	1–0	3–1	2–3	—	1–0	2–0	4–0	2–1	1–1	2–2	3–2	3–2	2–1	0–0	3–2	4–1	2–1
Celta	1–1	2–0	2–2	0–0	1–1	1–0	1–3	—	0–0	1–0	1–0	3–1	2–0	2–2	1–0	2–1	0–1	2–1	2–0	4–1
Deportivo	1–0	1–1	1–2	1–0	3–0	2–1	2–2	1–3	—	1–0	1–1	0–1	2–0	1–0	1–0	2–0	1–0	3–1	0–0	0–2
Elche	3–0	2–1	2–0	4–0	0–0	6–0	0–0	2–1	1–2	—	2–0	1–2	1–1	4–0	2–1	3–1	0–1	4–1	3–0	4–3
Granada	3–1	0–1	1–1	2–0	1–0	3–1	0–1	0–0	4–1	2–1	—	1–0	1–1	3–0	3–0	0–0	1–0	0–0	0–0	2–1
Hércules	3–1	2–1	2–1	1–2	0–0	2–0	2–2	1–0	2–0	0–0	2–0	—	3–0	1–1	3–1	0–1	2–4	1–1	3–0	2–1
Las Palmas	2–0	2–1	0–1	0–2	3–1	3–2	3–1	1–1	0–0	1–1	3–1	0–2	—	3–0	0–0	1–1	3–2	3–0	1–1	0–2
Linares	1–0	1–0	0–1	3–1	3–0	0–1	0–0	2–3	1–0	2–2	0–0	0–1	1–0	—	2–2	2–0	2–1	1–0	2–1	3–2
Oviedo	3–0	0–0	1–0	1–2	1–0	2–4	2–1	0–1	1–3	3–2	2–1	1–0	1–0	3–1	—	0–1	1–1	1–1	0–1	2–1
Palencia	2–1	4–0	0–0	1–2	0–0	2–1	1–2	1–1	0–0	2–2	0–2	1–1	1–0	1–0	1–1	—	0–3	1–0	0–1	1–1
Racing	2–1	5–3	2–1	1–4	0–0	4–0	1–1	2–1	2–1	0–0	1–2	1–0	4–0	1–0	2–1	3–0	—	0–0	1–0	0–0
Rayo	0–0	0–2	0–0	1–1	3–1	1–2	1–1	0–0	0–1	0–2	2–0	1–1	1–3	1–0	1–0	1–0	3–3	—	1–2	4–4
Recreativo	0–0	1–3	0–0	2–1	1–0	2–1	1–0	2–1	1–0	1–0	1–1	0–0	0–1	2–2	0–3	2–0	2–2	0–1	—	2–0
Tenerife	1–0	2–1	1–1	0–1	1–0	1–0	2–2	2–2	1–1	0–1	4–1	1–3	0–0	0–0	2–0	1–1	0–0	1–0	1–0	—

Source: BDFutbol
Legend: Blue = home team win; Yellow = draw; Red = away team win.
