= Estadio de Linarejos =

Stadium in Linares, Spain

Coordinates: 38.102995°N 3.622964°W

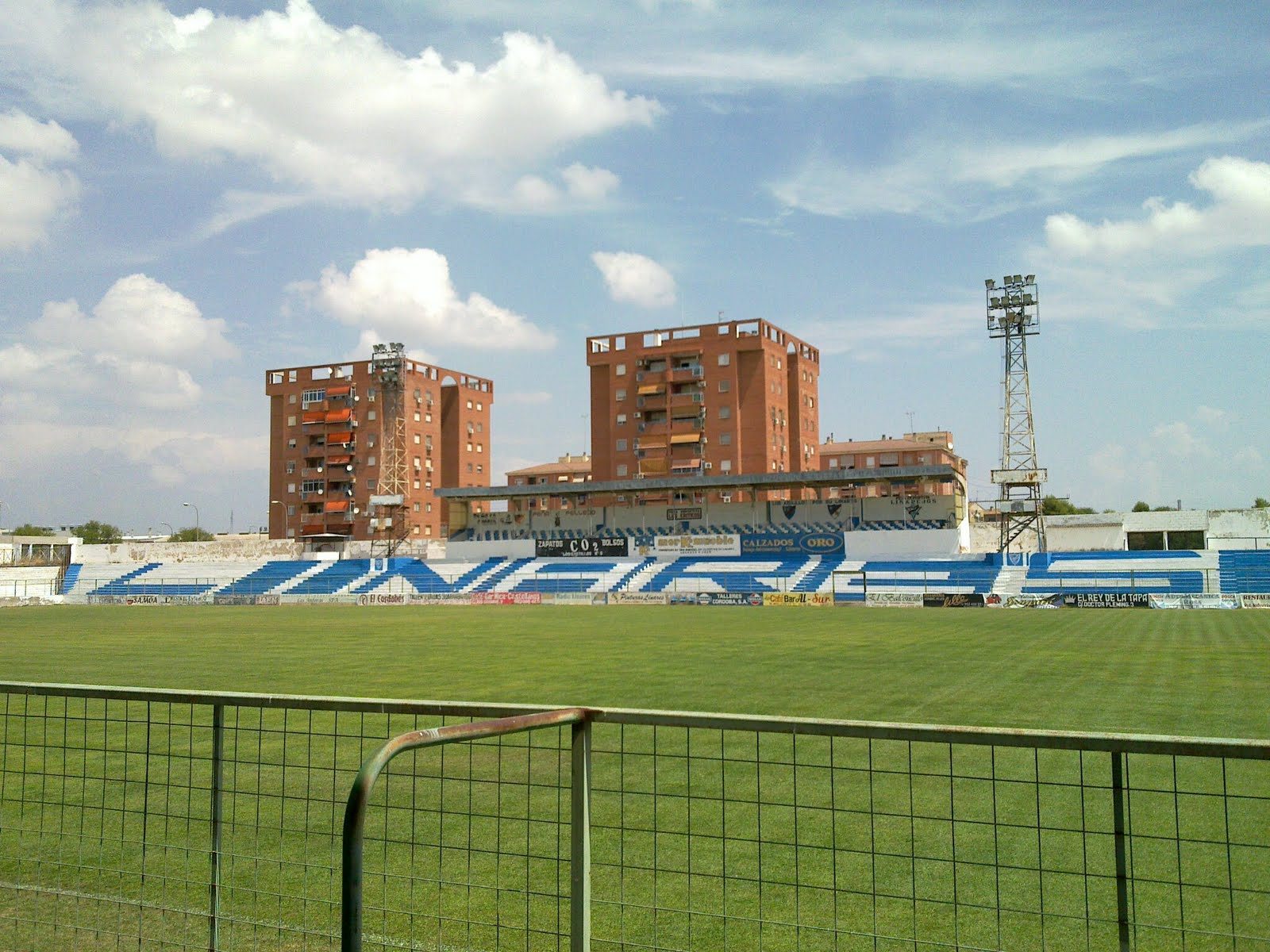
- Interactive map of Estadio de Linarejos
- Location: Linares, Spain
- Capacity: 10,000
- Surface: Grass

Construction
- Opened: 1955

Tenant
- Linares Deportivo

Estadio Municipal de Linarejos is a stadium in Linares, Spain. It is currently used for football matches and was the home ground of Linares Deportivo. The stadium holds 10,000 spectators.
