= Linares, Jaén =

City of Spain

Linares
- Municipality
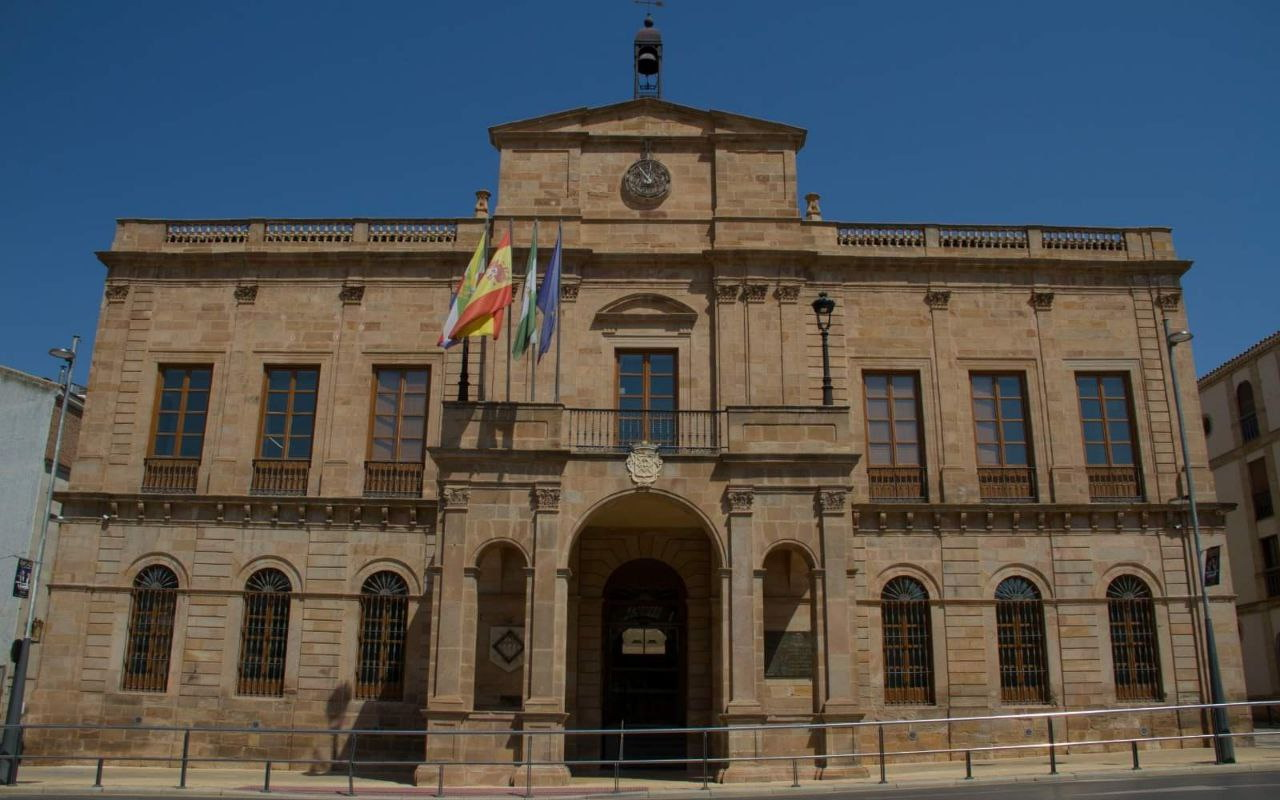
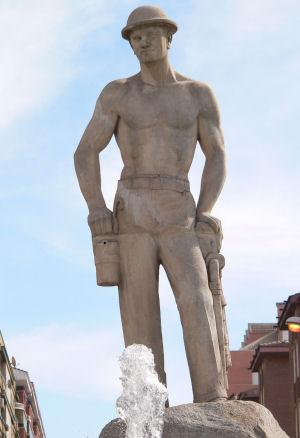
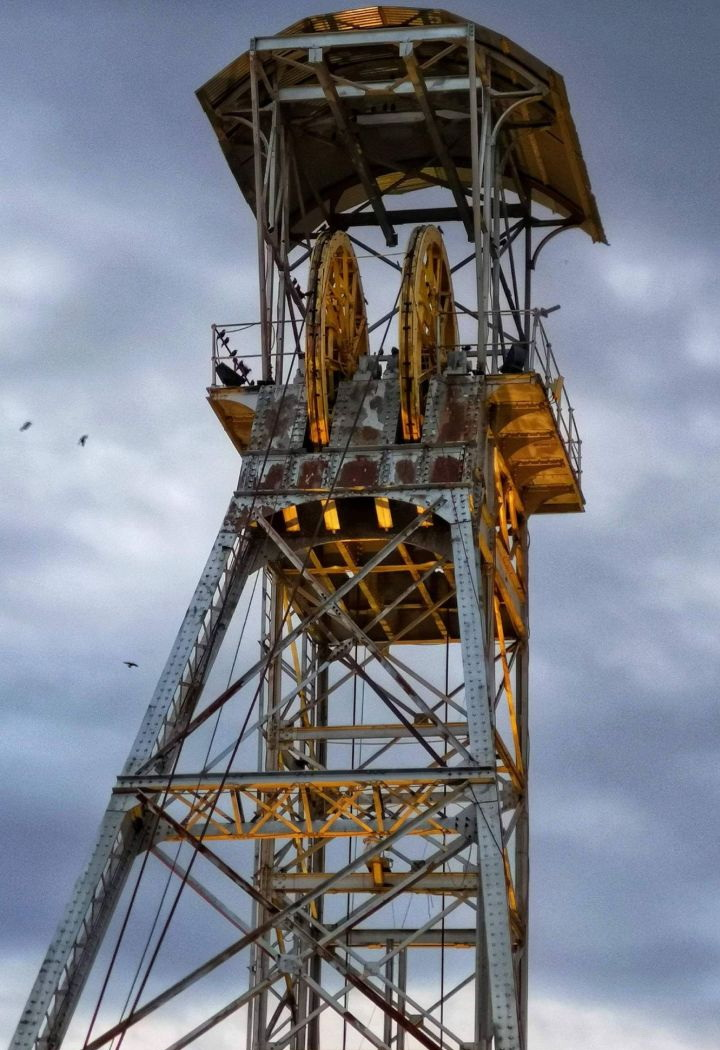
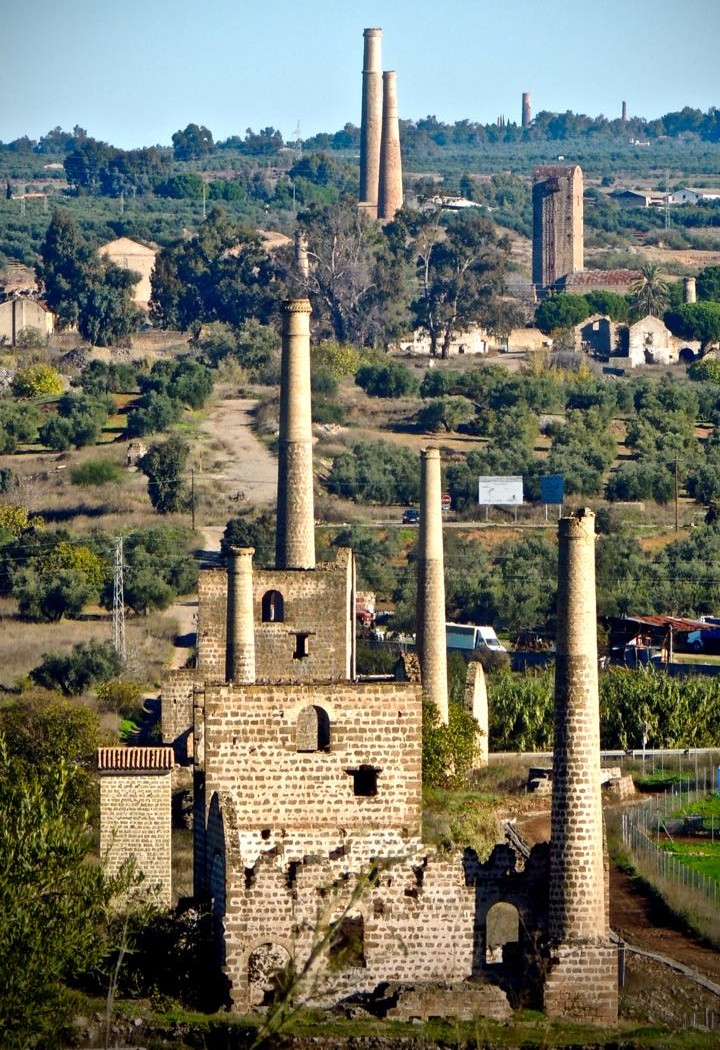
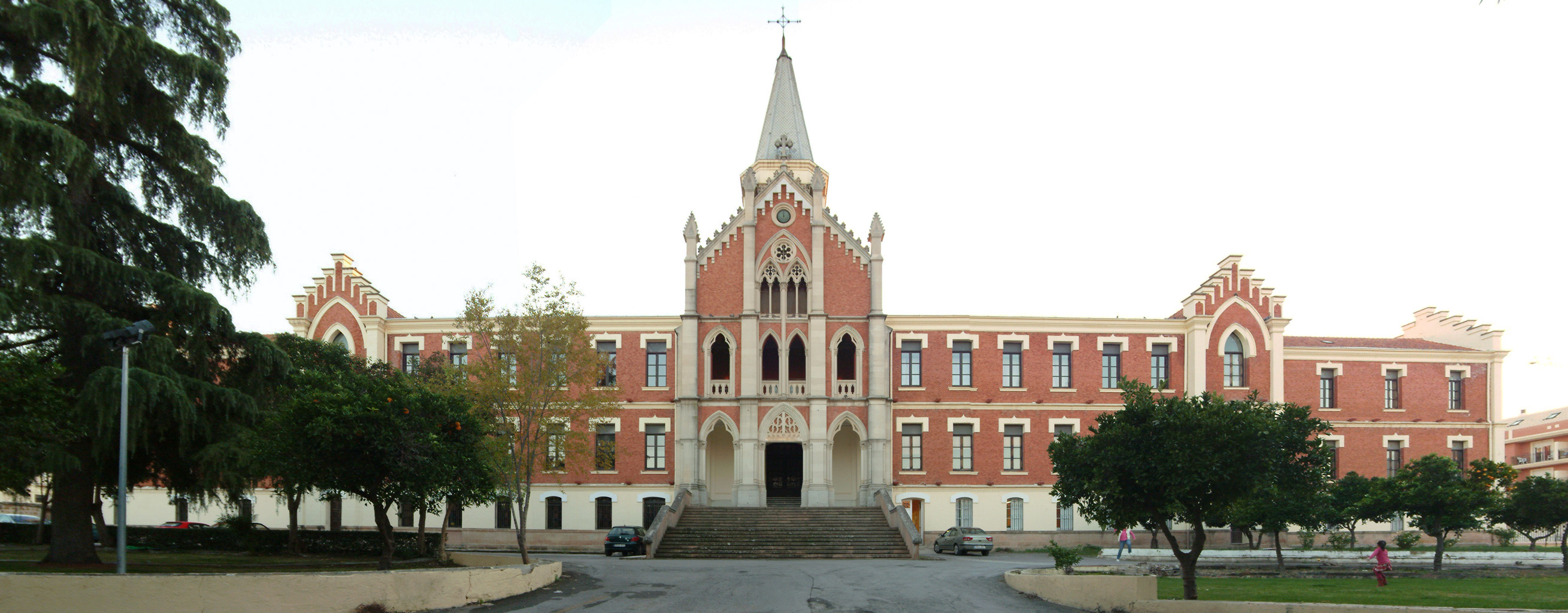
- City Hall, Miner's Monument, Mining Derrick, Mining District, Hospital of the Marquis of Linares

- Flag Coat of arms
- Nickname: La ciudad minera – The mining city
- Motto: Nunc coepi haec mutatio dexterae excelsi
- Location in Spain Linares (Andalusia) Linares (Province of Jaén (Spain))
- Coordinates: 38°05′N 3°38′W
- Country: Spain
- Autonomous community: Andalusia
- Province: Jaén

Government
  - Type: Mayor–council
  - Body: Ayuntamiento de Linares
  - Mayor: Auxiliadora del Olmo (PP)

Area
  - Total: 197.5 km^{2} (76.3 sq mi)
- Elevation (AMSL): 419 m (1,375 ft)

Population (2025-01-01)
  - Total: 55,633
  - Density: 281.7/km^{2} (729.6/sq mi)
- Demonym: linarense
- Time zone: UTC+1 (CET)
  - Summer (DST): UTC+2 (CEST)
- Postal code: 23700
- Area code: +34 (Spain) + (Jaén)
- Website: www.ciudaddelinares.es

Linares (Spanish pronunciation: [liˈnaɾes]) is a municipality of Spain belonging to the province of Jaén, Andalusia. It is the second-largest city in that province, with a population of 55,261 in the most recent census (2024). The altitude is 419 metres (1,375 feet) and the total area of the municipality is 195.15 square kilometres (75.35 sq mi).

Located on top an easily defendable terrace of the Guadalimar, the site of Castulo in the vicinity of Linares was an important mining center in the Upper Guadalquivir, both as an Oretani oppidum and as a Roman city. Losing population since the 3rd century CE, as well as local primacy (mint and bishopric) to Viatia (Baeza) in late antiquity, Castulo was largely abandoned and ruined by the 8th century, and only temporarily inhabited afterwards. Located some kilometres north of Castulo, Linares' origins lie on urban development around the Islamic fortress, although chronology is moot. First mentioned in 1152 under Castilian rule as a hamlet, Linares had consolidated as a sizeable rural settlement of Baeza by the turn of the 15th century. It received the privilege of township in 1565, thereby emancipating from Baeza.

== Overview ==
=== Location ===
Located in the west-central section of the province, the city of Linares is the second-largest city in the province after the capital, Jaén. It is also the commercial capital of Sierra Morena, as well as the referential city in the surrounding areas.

=== Geography ===
The city territory is oriented in a northeast-southwest direction, with the altitude decreasing between the higher northern area of Sierra Morena; Paño Pico, at an elevation of 552 m is the highest area of the municipal territory; and the lowest area, the Guadalimar Valley in the southwestern section, has an altitude of 318 m.

=== Geology ===
Linares is located in the area where two of the main morphological units of the Iberian Peninsula geographically converge: the Inner Plateau and the Baetic Depression. The first unit is characterized by an ancient peneplain, shaped over Paleozoic materials, such as granite and slate. The second unit consists of marl-sandy materials that have been filling the Guadalquivir depression since the Neogene. In these subhorizontal sediments, erosion has shaped low, rounded hills.

The subsoil of the municipality is composed of Paleozoic rocks, covered in large areas by more recent sediments. Both units—the Paleozoic basement and the post-Hercynian cover—differ greatly in composition, structure, external morphological expression, and mining significance. The Paleozoic basement of Linares is mainly represented by slates with intercalations of sandstones, granites, and intrusive dikes, as well as metamorphic formations at the contact between both units. The overlying cover consists exclusively of Triassic and Miocene sediments.

=== Climate ===
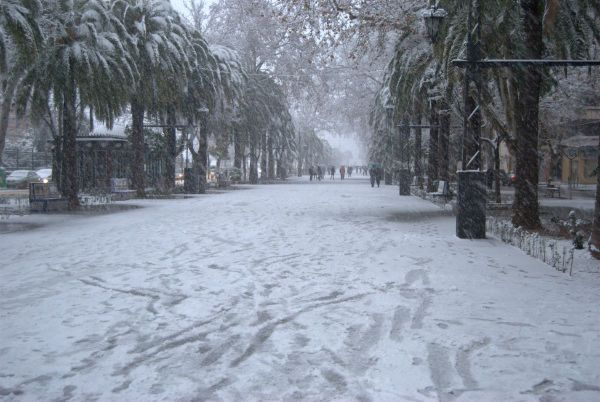
Paseo de Linarejos covered in snow in 2010. Snowfalls are very rare in Linares

The city has a Mediterranean Climate (Csa) clearly divided into four seasons, with hot and dry summers where the temperatures can reach frequently 40 °C, two transitioning seasons, spring and autumn, that concentrate most of the annual rainfall; and a moderate winter, with temperatures that can sometimes drop below 0 °C during night time, and occasional rainfall.

The annual medium temperature oscillates between 8 °C in January and 27 °C in July. Daily variations can reach 20 °C.

The annual rainfall is about 500 mm, with frequent fluctuations from year to year. Snow is rarely spotted in the city but storms, which are quite frequent, especially around summer and early autumn, can cause hail and large amounts of rainfall in short periods.

Climate data for Linares, 420 metres (1,380 ft) 1971-2000 averages
Month	Jan	Feb	Mar	Apr	May	Jun	Jul	Aug	Sep	Oct	Nov	Dec	Year
Mean daily maximum °C (°F)	13.4 (56.1)	15.4 (59.7)	19.0 (66.2)	20.8 (69.4)	25.6 (78.1)	31.7 (89.1)	36.6 (97.9)	36.0 (96.8)	31.1 (88.0)	23.6 (74.5)	17.5 (63.5)	14.1 (57.4)	23.7 (74.7)
Daily mean °C (°F)	8.3 (46.9)	9.9 (49.8)	12.6 (54.7)	14.3 (57.7)	18.6 (65.5)	23.8 (74.8)	27.9 (82.2)	25.8 (78.4)	23.5 (74.3)	17.6 (63.7)	12.3 (54.1)	9.3 (48.7)	17.0 (62.6)
Mean daily minimum °C (°F)	3.1 (37.6)	4.4 (39.9)	6.1 (43.0)	7.8 (46.0)	11.5 (52.7)	15.9 (60.6)	19.1 (66.4)	19.1 (66.4)	16.0 (60.8)	11.5 (52.7)	7.0 (44.6)	4.6 (40.3)	10.5 (50.9)
Average precipitation mm (inches)	53 (2.1)	55 (2.2)	42 (1.7)	54 (2.1)	36 (1.4)	22 (0.9)	3 (0.1)	4 (0.2)	19 (0.7)	54 (2.1)	59 (2.3)	72 (2.8)	478 (18.8)
Source: AEMET

== History ==
Near to Linares is the ancient Iberian town of Castulo, which dates to antiquity and earned much of its revenue from the lead mines located there.

Hitherto a hamlet of the land of Baeza, Linares was granted township status in 1565.

Around the middle of the 19th century Linares became an important mining center with lead mines nearby. The smelting of lead, the manufacture of lead sheets and pipes, and the production of by-product silver from the lead ores led to a significant population increase. The 6,000 inhabitants in 1849 became 36,000 in 1877. This commercial and industrial growth brought the concession of the title of city in 1875.

== Transport ==
The city is well connected to the rest of Spain. The A-4 highway, NIV Madrid-Cádiz, is located 12 km (7 miles) to the west at Bailén. The A-32 highway, also traverses through the city.

There is a railroad station at Linares-Baeza, with lines connecting Madrid and Cádiz, and Madrid-Granada-Almería. The railroad has also a cargo deck.

== Economy ==
The lead mines of Linares were in almost uninterrupted activity from pre-Roman times until the 1990s. There were also lead smelters and gunpowder, dynamite and rope factories as auxiliary to the mining industry. Currently, the mines of Linares are protected as cultural heritage.

Santana Motor, the former producer of all-terrain vehicles for the Spanish Army, was shut down in 2011 due to the economic recession. There is also a factory producing trains (Construcciones y Auxiliar de Ferrocarriles), a factory that produces components for wind turbines (Grupo Daniel Alonso y Gamesa), and a beet sugar plant (Azucareras Reunidas de Jaen S.A.), that produces biodiesel from colza oil, palm oil, soybeans, and sunflower oil.

== Sport ==
Historically the town was always represented by a professional football team; however, as teams folded new ones came to replace them, producing a long timeline of continuous clubs since 1909: SG Linarense (1909–20), Linares FC (1920–29), Gimnástica Linarense (1929–31), Linares Deportivo (1940–46), Atlético Linares (1946–48), CD Linares (1952–64), Linares CF (1961–90), CD Linares (1990–2009) and Linares Deportivo (2009–present).

Linares was also the place where the annual Linares chess tournament was held.

== Education ==
The city has also a recent university campus known as the Scientific-Technological Campus, opened in 2015, that offers a wide range of engineering studies, belonging to the University of Jaén since 1 July 1993.

== Personalities ==
The bull ring in Linares is famous for the death in 1947 of bullfighter Manolete (Manuel Rodríguez Sánchez). On 28 August every year, people place flowers on his statue in Linares. Manolete's death is remembered in the ring by putting a bunch of roses in the place where he fell.

Linares is the birthplace of classical guitarist Andrés Segovia, singer Raphael and the hometown of jazz vocalist Virginia Maestro and Blessed Manuel Lozano Garrido, who was beatified on Saturday 12 June 2010 in Linares. Also, it is the hometown of the writer Fanny Rubio.

== International relations ==
=== Twin towns – Sister cities ===
Linares is twinned with:

- Linares, Nuevo León, Mexico
- Linares, Maule, Chile
- Linares, Nariño, Colombia
- Tomaszów Mazowiecki, Poland
- Castres, France

== See also ==
- List of municipalities in Jaén
