= 1985–86 Segunda División B =

Season of third division football in Spain

Segunda División B
- Season: 1985–86
- Champions: Figueres; Xerez
- Promoted: Figueres; Xerez
- Relegated: Alavés; Alcalá; Algeciras; Andorra; Arosa; Barcelona Aficionados; Betis Deportivo; Binéfar; Compostela; FC Andorra; Gimnàstic; Jaén; L'Hospitalet; Lalín; Levante; Linares; Lorca; Manacor; Orihuela; Parla; Plasencia; Puertollano; Sporting Atlético; Talavera; Zamora
- Matches: 760
- Goals: 1,822 (2.4 per match)
- Top goalscorer: Antonio Cuevas (25 goals)
- Best goalkeeper: Carlos Osma (0.63 goals/match)
- Biggest home win: Pontevedra 8–1 Binéfar (22 December 1985); Lleida 7–0 Arosa (22 December 1985)
- Biggest away win: Lalín 0–5 Salamanca (23 February 1986)
- Highest scoring: Pontevedra 8–1 Binéfar (22 December 1985)

The 1985–86 Segunda División B season was the 9th since its establishment. The first matches of the season were played on 31 August 1985, and the season ended on 18 May 1986.

The division consisted of two geographic groups. Figueres were the Group I champions and Xerez were the Group II champions.

== Overview before the season ==
40 teams joined the league, including four relegated from the 1984–85 Segunda División and 6 promoted from the 1984–85 Tercera División. The composition of the groups was determined by the Royal Spanish Football Federation, attending to geographical criteria.

Relegated from Segunda División

- Salamanca
- Granada
- Puertollano
- Lorca

Promoted from Tercera División

- Plasencia
- Lalín
- Betis Deportivo
- Córdoba
- Ourense
- Real Burgos

== Group 1 ==
=== Teams ===
Teams from Andorra, Aragon, Asturias, Basque Country, Castile and León, Catalonia and Galicia.

Location of teams in Segunda División B Gr. 1 1985–86

Team	Founded	Home city	Stadium
Alavés	1921	Vitoria-Gasteiz, Basque Country	Mendizorrotza
Andorra	1957	Andorra, Aragon	Juan Antonio Endeiza
FC Andorra	1942	Andorra la Vella, Andorra	Comunal
Arosa	1945	Vilagarcía de Arousa, Galicia	A Lomba
Barcelona Aficionados	1967	Barcelona, Catalonia	Mini Estadi
Binéfar	1922	Binéfar, Aragon	El Segalar
Real Burgos	1983	Burgos	El Plantío
Compostela	1962	Compostela, Galicia	Santa Isabel
Figueres	1919	Figueres, Catalonia	L'Alfar
Gimnàstic de Tarragona	1886	Tarragona, Catalonia	Nou Estadi
Hospitalet	1957	L'Hospitalet de Llobregat, Catalonia	Municipal de Deportes
Lalín	1974	Lalín, Galicia	Manuel Anxo Cortizo
Lleida	1939	Lleida	Camp d'Esports
Orense	1952	Ourense, Galicia	O Couto
Palencia	1960	Palencia, Castile and León	La Balastera
Pontevedra	1941	Pontevedra, Galicia	Pasarón
Salamanca	1923	Salamanca, Castile and León	Helmántico
San Sebastián	1951	San Sebastián, Basque Country	Atotxa
Sporting Atlético	1960	Gijón, Asturias	Mareo
Zamora	1968	Zamora, Castile and León	Ramiro Ledesma

=== League table ===
Pos	Team	Pld	W	D	L	GF	GA	GD	Pts	Qualification or relegation
1	Figueres	38	22	11	5	71	31	+40	55	Promotion to Segunda División
2	Real Burgos	38	18	12	8	47	32	+15	48 (Note: Real Burgos finished ahead of Salamanca on head-to-head points: Real Burgos–Salamanca 2–1, Salamanca–Real Burgos 0–0)	
3	Salamanca	38	20	8	10	55	32	+23	48	
4	Lleida	38	17	12	9	49	25	+24	46 (Note: Lleida finished ahead of Alavés and Ourense on head-to-head points: Lleida 5 pts, Alavés 4 pts, Ourense 3 pts)	
5	Alavés (Note: Alavés was relegated to Tercera División due to financial problems)	38	16	14	8	46	31	+15	46	Relegation to Tercera División
6	Ourense	38	18	10	10	49	32	+17	46	
7	Palencia (Note: Palencia was dissolved at the end of the season)	38	16	11	11	43	34	+9	43	Dissolved
8	San Sebastián	38	16	10	12	57	53	+4	42	
9	Pontevedra	38	12	15	11	48	41	+7	39 (Note: Pontevedra finished ahead of L'Hospitalet and Zamora on head-to-head points: Pontevedra 5 pts, L'Hospitalet 4 pts, Zamora 3 pts)	
10	L'Hospitalet	38	17	5	16	55	52	+3	39	Relegation to Tercera División
11	Zamora	38	13	13	12	47	38	+9	39	Relegation to Tercera División
12	Binéfar	38	12	13	13	47	51	−4	37 (Note: Binéfar finished ahead of Andorra on head-to-head points: Andorra–Binéfar 1–2, Binéfar–Andorra 0–0)	Relegation to Tercera División
13	Andorra	38	12	13	13	59	58	+1	37	Relegation to Tercera División
14	Gimnàstic	38	15	6	17	43	42	+1	36	Relegation to Tercera División
15	FC Andorra	38	9	13	16	43	57	−14	31	Relegation to Tercera División
16	Sporting Atlético	38	9	11	18	39	61	−22	29 (Note: Sporting Gijón B finished ahead of Arosa on head-to-head points: Sporting Gijón B–Arosa 2–0, Arosa–Sporting Gijón B 0–0)	Relegation to Tercera División
17	Arosa	38	8	13	17	37	67	−30	29	Relegation to Tercera División
18	Compostela	38	10	6	22	46	72	−26	26	Relegation to Tercera División
19	Barcelona Aficionados	38	6	11	21	35	61	−26	23	Relegation to Tercera División
20	Lalín	38	6	9	23	26	72	−46	21	Relegation to Tercera División

Source: BDFútbol
Rules for classification: 1) points; 2) head-to-head points; 3) head-to-head goal difference; 4) goal difference; 5) number of goals scored

=== Results ===
Home \ Away	ALV	AND	FCA	ARO	BAR	BIN	BUR	COM	FIG	GIM	HOS	LAL	LLE	ORE	PAL	PNT	SAL	SSE	SPO	ZAM
Alavés	—	0–0	1–0	6–1	1–0	3–0	0–0	3–1	1–1	1–0	3–2	2–0	0–1	1–0	0–1	1–1	2–0	1–0	1–1	2–0
Andorra	2–0	—	2–0	3–3	3–1	1–2	1–1	2–0	2–3	2–2	1–2	5–1	0–0	2–1	1–4	0–0	4–2	4–3	1–1	2–6
FC Andorra	0–0	1–1	—	3–0	1–1	2–2	1–1	2–1	1–3	1–3	2–1	1–1	0–1	1–0	2–2	1–1	0–0	0–0	2–1	0–0
Arosa	0–2	1–1	4–3	—	1–1	4–2	1–1	1–1	0–0	0–1	2–0	3–0	0–3	0–0	1–0	1–2	2–0	3–1	0–0	1–0
Barcelona Aficionados	2–0	1–2	0–3	3–0	—	1–1	1–2	3–0	0–2	1–2	0–2	2–0	0–0	2–2	1–3	1–1	0–0	2–1	4–2	0–0
Binéfar	1–1	0–0	5–1	3–1	2–0	—	0–3	5–2	0–0	2–0	1–2	0–0	0–0	1–1	0–0	1–0	3–0	2–1	5–1	0–0
Real Burgos	2–2	1–1	2–2	1–0	2–0	1–0	—	2–1	0–0	1–0	2–1	2–1	1–0	0–1	0–1	3–0	2–1	2–0	1–0	2–1
Compostela	1–2	0–1	0–3	2–1	3–1	0–2	2–3	—	3–3	1–0	2–0	2–0	0–0	1–4	1–2	3–2	2–3	1–3	0–2	1–0
Figueres	4–0	1–0	4–1	1–0	4–0	1–1	2–0	3–0	—	5–1	2–0	4–0	0–2	3–1	2–1	1–0	2–1	4–1	4–0	1–1
Gimnàstic	1–0	0–4	1–2	3–0	1–0	4–0	0–0	1–2	2–1	—	2–1	1–2	0–1	2–0	0–1	3–1	2–1	2–0	1–1	2–0
Hospitalet	3–1	1–1	3–2	3–1	1–1	2–1	2–1	3–1	0–2	1–0	—	3–1	2–0	4–2	0–0	2–0	0–1	1–4	2–0	3–0
Lalín	1–1	2–3	0–1	1–1	2–1	1–0	0–1	1–4	1–3	1–1	3–1	—	1–4	0–3	0–0	0–0	0–5	0–1	1–0	1–0
Lleida	1–1	0–0	1–0	7–0	1–1	2–0	2–1	1–1	1–2	0–2	0–2	3–1	—	4–0	3–0	0–2	1–0	2–0	0–0	1–0
Orense	0–0	2–1	2–1	0–0	2–2	0–1	1–0	2–0	2–0	2–0	2–1	2–0	2–0	—	1–0	4–0	2–0	0–0	1–0	1–1
Palencia	0–1	2–1	3–0	3–1	3–0	0–0	2–1	1–2	2–0	1–1	1–1	1–1	1–0	1–0	—	0–0	1–0	0–1	3–1	0–0
Pontevedra	0–3	2–0	2–0	1–1	4–1	8–1	0–0	1–1	1–1	1–1	2–0	4–1	1–1	1–1	1–0	—	0–1	1–3	2–0	3–1
Salamanca	0–0	3–0	3–1	5–0	2–1	2–0	0–0	1–1	3–0	1–0	3–1	2–1	1–0	0–0	2–0	1–0	—	1–1	2–1	2–1
San Sebastián	2–2	2–1	2–2	2–2	1–0	2–1	2–1	2–0	2–2	1–0	2–1	2–0	1–1	0–3	5–2	0–0	1–2	—	3–0	3–2
Sporting Atlético	1–1	3–2	2–0	2–0	1–0	2–2	2–3	3–2	0–0	2–1	0–0	0–0	1–4	1–2	2–0	1–2	0–4	1–1	—	2–0
Zamora	1–0	4–2	1–0	0–0	3–0	2–0	1–1	3–1	0–0	1–0	3–1	3–0	1–1	1–0	1–1	1–1	0–0	4–1	4–2	—

Source: BDFútbol
Legend: Blue = home team win; Yellow = draw; Red = away team win.

=== Top goalscorers ===
Goalscorers	Goals	Team
(Spain) Antonio Cuevas	25	Figueres
(Spain) Martín Begiristain	20	San Sebastián
(Spain) César Melo	16	Compostela
(Spain) Salvador Cardona	15	L'Hospitalet
(Spain) Martín Domínguez	14	Barcelona Aficionados

=== Top goalkeepers ===
Goalkeeper	Goals	Matches	Average	Team
(Spain) Roberto Santamaría	20	29	0.69	Lleida
(Spain) Ángel Lozano	29	36	0.81	Salamanca
(Spain) Francesc Boix	31	38	0.82	Figueres
(Spain) Iñaki Bergara	31	38	0.82	Alavés
(Spain) Fermín Hortas	31	36	0.86	Ourense

== Group 2 ==
Teams from Andalusia, Balearic Islands, Castilla–La Mancha, Ceuta, Extremadura, Madrid, Region of Murcia and Valencian Community.

=== Teams ===
Location of teams in Segunda División B Gr. 2 1985–86

Team	Founded	Home city	Stadium
Alcalá	1923	Alcalá de Henares, Madrid	El Val
Alcoyano	1928	Alcoy, Valencian Community	El Collao
Algeciras	1909	Algeciras, Andalusia	El Mirador
Betis Deportivo	1962	Seville, Andalusia	Benito Villamarín
Calvo Sotelo	1948	Puertollano, Castilla–La Mancha	Empetrol
Ceuta	1970	Ceuta	Alfonso Murube
Córdoba	1954	Córdoba, Andalusia	El Arcángel
Granada	1931	Granada, Andalusia	Los Cármenes
Real Jaén	1929	Jaén, Andalusia	La Victoria
Levante	1909	Valencia, Valencian Community	Nou Estadi Llevant
Linares	1961	Linares, Andalusia	Linarejos
Linense	1912	La Línea de la Concepción, Andalusia	Municipal La Línea de la Concepción
Lorca	1969	Lorca, Region of Murcia	San José
Manacor	1923	Manacor, Balearic Islands	Na Capellera
Orihuela	1944	Orihuela, Valencian Community	Los Arcos
Parla	1973	Parla, Madrid	Los Prados
Plasencia	1941	Plasencia, Extremadura	Ciudad Deportiva
Poblense	1935	Sa Pobla, Balearic Islands	Nou Camp Sa Pobla
Talavera	1948	Talavera de la Reina, Castilla–La Mancha	El Prado
Xerez	1947	Jerez de la Frontera, Andalusia	Domecq

=== League table ===
Pos	Team	Pld	W	D	L	GF	GA	GD	Pts	Qualification or relegation
1	Xerez	38	18	11	9	43	24	+19	47	Promotion to Segunda División
2	Linense	38	20	6	12	64	44	+20	46	
3	Córdoba	38	14	15	9	42	38	+4	43 (Note: Córdoba finished ahead of Ceuta on head-to-head points: Ceuta–Córdoba 3–3, Córdoba–Ceuta 1–0)	
4	Ceuta	38	17	9	12	43	35	+8	43	
5	Alcoyano	38	15	12	11	44	39	+5	42 (Note: Alcoyano finished ahead of Poblense on head-to-head points: Poblense–Alcoyano 1–1, Alcoyano–Poblense 3–1)	
6	Poblense	38	15	12	11	48	43	+5	42	
7	Granada	38	15	11	12	62	47	+15	41 (Note: Granada finished ahead of Puertollano and Orihuela on head-to-head points: Granada 6 pts, Puertollano 4 pts, Orihuela 2 pts)	
8	Calvo Sotelo	38	15	11	12	44	41	+3	41	Relegation to Tercera División
9	Orihuela	38	15	11	12	39	39	0	41	Relegation to Tercera División
10	Levante	38	16	6	16	43	50	−7	38 (Note: Levante finished ahead of Parla on number of goals scored)	Relegation to Tercera División
11	Parla	38	13	12	13	34	41	−7	38	Relegation to Tercera División
12	Plasencia	38	13	11	14	41	46	−5	37 (Note: Plasencia finished ahead of Talavera on number of yellow cards)	Relegation to Tercera División
13	Talavera	38	13	11	14	41	46	−5	37	Relegation to Tercera División
14	Linares	38	12	12	14	39	40	−1	36	Relegation to Tercera División
15	Betis Deportivo	38	11	13	14	56	45	+11	35 (Note: Betis Deportivo finished ahead of Manacor on head-to-head goal difference: Betis Deportivo–Manacor 3–0, Manacor–Betis Deportivo 1–0)	Relegation to Tercera División
16	Manacor	38	13	9	16	40	47	−7	35	Relegation to Tercera División
17	Alcalá	38	11	12	15	36	40	−4	34	Relegation to Tercera División
18	Jaén	38	12	9	17	47	53	−6	33	Relegation to Tercera División
19	Algeciras	38	8	11	19	35	55	−20	27	Relegation to Tercera División
20	Lorca	38	7	10	21	39	67	−28	24	Relegation to Tercera División

Source: BDFútbol
Rules for classification: 1) points; 2) head-to-head points; 3) head-to-head goal difference; 4) goal difference; 5) number of goals scored

=== Results ===
Home \ Away	ALA	ALC	ALG	BET	CAL	CEU	COR	GRA	JAE	LEV	LNR	LNS	LOR	MAN	ORI	PAR	PLA	POB	TAL	XER
Alcalá	—	2–0	0–0	2–1	1–0	0–0	1–1	1–1	2–0	0–1	0–0	3–1	4–2	3–0	0–2	0–0	1–1	2–0	2–0	0–1
Alcoyano	3–0	—	1–0	0–2	1–3	0–0	2–1	1–1	0–0	3–0	2–0	2–2	2–0	4–3	0–0	1–0	2–0	3–1	2–0	1–0
Algeciras	2–0	0–0	—	1–1	0–2	0–1	2–0	1–2	3–1	2–1	1–1	1–3	2–1	1–1	3–0	3–0	1–2	1–1	0–0	0–1
Betis Deportivo	1–1	1–1	6–1	—	2–1	3–0	5–0	3–3	2–3	2–0	0–0	0–0	3–0	3–0	0–2	4–0	2–1	2–2	1–1	0–1
Calvo Sotelo	3–2	1–0	0–0	1–1	—	0–0	2–1	0–3	1–1	4–0	1–0	2–1	1–1	2–0	2–0	1–2	1–0	1–0	0–2	1–0
Ceuta	2–1	2–0	2–1	0–1	1–0	—	3–3	3–1	4–2	2–0	0–0	3–1	2–0	1–0	0–0	3–0	1–2	2–0	2–1	1–0
Córdoba	2–0	4–1	1–0	2–2	1–0	1–0	—	1–0	3–1	3–2	2–0	1–0	1–1	0–0	1–1	1–1	1–0	0–1	1–0	0–0
Granada	0–1	1–1	4–1	3–0	2–1	2–0	0–0	—	1–1	1–1	1–0	2–3	2–0	1–0	4–1	3–1	3–1	6–2	0–1	2–1
Jaén	1–1	0–2	0–1	2–1	2–3	1–0	1–2	0–0	—	3–1	0–1	1–0	3–0	1–0	2–0	1–1	2–2	1–1	5–0	2–2
Levante	2–0	2–0	1–0	2–0	2–1	3–1	1–1	1–1	2–1	—	0–1	1–0	3–1	2–1	1–1	1–0	3–0	2–0	1–2	0–0
Linares	3–0	2–2	3–0	3–2	1–1	1–1	1–0	2–0	1–2	2–0	—	0–0	3–1	2–1	3–0	0–1	4–3	0–0	0–1	0–0
Linense	2–1	2–1	2–0	3–1	4–1	3–0	3–2	2–2	2–1	2–0	6–1	—	1–0	3–0	1–1	1–0	2–0	3–2	4–3	1–0
Lorca	1–1	0–0	2–2	1–0	1–1	1–1	1–1	2–2	5–0	2–1	3–2	0–2	—	2–0	1–2	1–2	0–1	2–1	3–2	1–3
Manacor	0–0	1–1	2–2	1–0	1–1	3–2	1–1	1–0	1–2	3–0	1–0	1–0	1–0	—	5–0	4–3	1–0	0–0	2–1	2–0
Orihuela	0–0	2–3	2–0	1–0	0–1	1–0	2–0	3–2	1–0	1–2	0–0	1–0	4–1	2–0	—	1–2	0–1	0–0	2–1	2–0
Parla	1–0	1–0	0–0	0–0	0–0	1–0	1–1	2–3	0–3	1–0	1–0	1–1	2–1	2–0	1–1	—	1–1	0–2	3–0	0–1
Plasencia	2–3	0–1	2–1	3–2	1–1	1–2	1–0	2–1	2–0	2–3	1–0	2–0	1–0	2–1	0–2	1–1	—	0–0	0–0	1–1
Poblense	2–1	1–1	1–0	1–1	4–1	0–1	0–1	2–1	1–0	4–1	1–1	3–2	3–0	1–2	2–1	1–0	1–1	—	3–1	1–0
Talavera	1–0	3–0	4–2	1–1	1–1	0–0	0–0	3–1	2–1	0–0	2–0	1–0	1–1	2–0	0–0	0–2	1–1	0–1	—	1–3
Xerez	1–0	1–0	4–0	1–0	2–1	1–0	1–1	1–0	2–0	2–0	3–1	3–1	4–0	0–0	0–0	0–0	0–0	2–2	1–2	—

Source: BDFútbol
Legend: Blue = home team win; Yellow = draw; Red = away team win.

=== Top goalscorers ===
Goalscorers	Goals	Team
(Spain) Paquito	24	Granada
(Spain) Argimiro Márquez	22	Linense
(Spain) Antonio Torres	14	Xerez
(Spain) Segundo Ramos	13	Linense
(Spain) Andrés Pizarro	13	Poblense

=== Top goalkeepers ===
Goalkeeper	Goals	Matches	Average	Team
(Spain) Carlos Osma	24	38	0.63	Xerez
(Spain) Juan Braojos	25	31	0.81	Linares
(Spain) Tomás Cuenca	28	31	0.9	Alcoyano
(Spain) José Luis Burgueña	35	38	0.92	Ceuta
(Spain) José María Olivares	35	36	0.97	Alcalá
