= 1983–84 Segunda División B =

Season of third division football in Spain

Segunda División B
- Season: 1983–84
- Champions: CE Sabadell FC; CF Lorca Deportiva
- Promoted: CE Sabadell FC; CF Lorca Deportiva; CD Logroñés; CF Calvo Sotelo
- Relegated: Barakaldo CF; SD Huesca; Racing Ferrol; RC Portuense; Córdoba CF; SD Ibiza
- Matches: 760
- Goals: 1,893 (2.49 per match)
- Top goalscorer: Pepe Mel (30 goals)
- Best goalkeeper: Luciano Casado (0.65 goals/match)
- Biggest home win: AgD Ceuta 8–0 RB Linense (13 May 1984)
- Biggest away win: Club Erandio 1–7 CD Logroñés (4 December 1983)
- Highest scoring: AgD Ceuta 8–0 RB Linense (13 May 1984); UD Lérida 5–3 FC Andorra (23 October 1983); RSD Alcalá 5–3 Córdoba CF (18 March 1984)

The 1983–84 Segunda División B season was the 7th since its establishment. The first matches of the season were played on 3 September 1983, and the season ended on 27 May 1984.

The division consisted of two geographic groups. CE Sabadell FC were the Group I champions and CF Lorca Deportiva were the Group II champions.

== Overview before the season ==
40 teams joined the league, including four relegated from the 1982–83 Segunda División and 6 promoted from the 1982–83 Tercera División. The composition of the groups was determined by the Royal Spanish Football Federation, attending to geographical criteria.

Relegated from Segunda División

- Deportivo Alavés
- CE Sabadell FC
- Xerez CD
- Córdoba CF

Promoted from Tercera División

- UD Figueras
- RB Linense
- Arosa SC
- Manacor
- Zamora CF
- CD Ensidesa (merged with Real Avilés Industrial)

== Group I ==
=== Teams ===
Teams from Andorra, Aragon, Asturias, Basque Country, Catalonia, Galicia and Navarre.

Location of teams in Segunda División B Gr. 1 1983–84

Team	Founded	Home city	Stadium
Alavés	1921	Vitoria-Gasteiz, Basque Country	Mendizorrotza
Endesa Andorra	1957	Andorra, Aragon	Juan Antonio Endeiza
FC Andorra	1942	Andorra la Vella, Andorra	Comunal
Arosa	1945	Vilagarcía de Arousa, Galicia	A Lomba
Real Avilés Industrial	1903	Avilés, Asturias	Muro de Zaro
Barakaldo	1917	Barakaldo, Basque Country	Lasesarre
Binéfar	1922	Binéfar, Aragon	El Segalar
Compostela	1962	Compostela, Galicia	Santa Isabel
Erandio	1915	Erandio, Basque Country	Nuevo Ategorri
Figueras	1919	Figueres, Catalonia	L'Alfar
Gimnástico de Tarragona	1886	Tarragona, Catalonia	Nou Estadi
Huesca	1960	Huesca, Aragon	El Alcoraz
Lérida	1939	Lleida, Catalonia	Camp d'Esports
Logroñés	1940	Logroño, La Rioja	Las Gaunas
Osasuna Promesas	1962	Pamplona, Navarre	Tajonar
Racing de Ferrol	1919	Ferrol, Galicia	Manuel Rivera
Sabadell	1903	Sabadell, Catalonia	La Nova Creu Alta
San Sebastián	1951	San Sebastián, Basque Country	Atotxa
Sestao	1916	Sestao, Basque Country	Las Llanas
Sporting Atlético	1960	Gijón, Asturias	Mareo

=== League table ===
Pos	Team	Pld	W	D	L	GF	GA	GD	Pts	Promotion or relegation
1	CE Sabadell FC	38	19	13	6	73	31	+42	51	Promoted to Segunda División
2	CD Logroñés	38	21	9	8	68	26	+42	51	Promoted to Segunda División
3	Dep. Alavés	38	21	8	9	65	35	+30	50	
4	UD Figueras	38	20	8	10	56	47	+9	48	
5	Gimnástico de Tarragona	38	19	9	10	57	38	+19	47	
6	Sestao SC	38	18	10	10	57	36	+21	46	
7	CD Binéfar	38	17	8	13	50	40	+10	42	
8	UD Lérida	38	16	10	12	53	39	+14	42	
9	San Sebastián CF	38	15	11	12	43	38	+5	41	
10	Andorra FC	38	14	13	11	52	44	+8	41	
11	Osasuna Promesas	38	15	8	15	39	44	−5	38	
12	CD Endesa Andorra	38	14	9	15	47	50	−3	37	
13	Sporting Atlético	38	16	5	17	50	47	+3	37	
14	SD Compostela	38	11	11	16	41	55	−14	33	
15	Arosa SC	38	11	8	19	39	64	−25	30	
16	Real Avilés Industrial	38	11	7	20	50	68	−18	29	
17	Club Erandio	38	10	9	19	42	65	−23	29	
18	Barakaldo CF	38	11	6	21	46	75	−29	28	Relegated to Tercera División
19	SD Huesca	38	9	6	23	33	68	−35	24	Relegated to Tercera División
20	Racing Ferrol	38	3	10	25	25	76	−51	16	Relegated to Tercera División

Source: BDFútbol

=== Results ===
Home \ Away	ALV	AND	FCA	ARO	AVI	BAR	BIN	COM	ERA	FIG	GIM	HUE	LLE	LOG	OSA	RFE	SAB	SSE	SES	SPO
Alavés	—	4–0	0–0	1–0	3–4	3–1	1–0	2–0	1–1	2–0	1–0	0–1	2–1	1–1	4–0	2–0	2–2	2–1	2–1	2–0
Endesa Andorra	3–1	—	0–0	2–0	3–2	1–1	0–1	1–1	2–0	1–2	3–2	4–0	1–1	1–1	3–1	4–0	0–3	0–0	2–0	1–0
FC Andorra	3–2	1–0	—	3–0	2–2	3–0	2–2	0–0	2–1	4–1	2–0	1–1	3–1	0–0	1–0	4–2	1–1	1–3	2–1	3–1
Arosa	1–4	3–0	1–0	—	3–0	3–2	0–0	1–0	1–0	0–2	1–1	0–1	4–3	0–3	0–0	3–1	1–3	1–1	2–1	1–0
Real Avilés Ind.	1–3	2–0	1–1	1–1	—	5–0	0–1	1–2	3–1	3–1	0–1	2–0	2–1	2–3	1–2	3–0	0–5	1–3	0–0	2–0
Barakaldo	1–1	0–1	2–1	4–2	1–2	—	4–1	3–2	4–2	3–1	2–0	2–1	1–2	0–4	1–1	2–1	1–2	2–1	0–0	1–2
Binéfar	1–1	1–0	0–1	5–1	4–1	3–0	—	2–0	3–0	1–1	1–2	2–1	2–0	1–0	3–0	2–0	3–4	1–0	1–1	2–1
Compostela	0–0	3–0	1–1	1–1	0–1	3–1	1–0	—	3–1	2–0	2–2	1–0	2–3	0–3	1–0	1–0	1–1	1–2	3–1	1–3
Erandio	0–3	1–1	1–0	2–0	1–0	2–1	1–1	4–3	—	1–2	0–0	3–0	2–1	1–7	2–0	4–1	0–0	2–0	1–1	0–2
Figueras	1–1	1–0	1–1	2–1	3–1	3–2	2–1	3–0	3–2	—	1–0	4–1	1–1	2–1	1–0	3–0	2–1	2–2	0–0	1–0
Gimn. Tarragona	1–0	1–4	2–2	3–0	3–1	3–1	2–0	5–2	1–1	3–0	—	4–1	0–1	1–0	2–0	2–0	2–1	1–0	2–1	3–1
Huesca	0–4	1–1	0–1	0–2	2–1	1–0	4–0	0–0	1–0	2–3	1–1	—	0–3	0–1	0–0	3–1	1–2	0–1	2–2	2–0
Lérida	2–1	2–0	5–3	5–0	0–0	1–1	0–0	1–0	2–0	1–0	0–2	2–0	—	3–1	2–1	1–0	0–0	1–1	3–0	0–0
Logroñés	0–1	3–0	3–0	2–2	4–0	4–0	2–1	0–0	3–0	1–0	3–1	3–1	0–0	—	2–1	3–0	0–1	0–0	2–1	2–0
Osasuna Promesas	2–0	0–0	1–0	2–0	1–0	1–0	1–0	1–2	2–2	0–2	2–1	3–0	2–2	1–0	—	2–1	2–1	2–0	0–3	5–1
Racing Ferrol	0–3	0–3	1–1	2–2	1–1	1–1	0–1	2–0	1–1	2–2	0–0	2–1	2–1	1–3	1–1	—	0–0	0–1	0–1	0–3
Sabadell	3–1	4–1	1–0	2–0	5–0	5–0	1–1	6–0	2–1	1–0	0–0	5–0	1–0	0–0	1–1	4–0	—	2–2	1–1	1–2
San Sebastián	1–2	2–0	1–0	1–0	3–2	2–0	1–0	2–1	5–1	0–1	1–1	3–2	1–0	1–2	0–1	0–0	0–0	—	2–2	0–0
Sestao	0–1	4–1	3–1	2–1	4–1	0–1	3–0	1–1	2–0	1–1	1–0	4–1	1–0	1–0	2–0	2–1	2–1	2–0	—	3–0
Sporting Atlético	2–1	1–3	2–1	2–0	1–1	4–0	1–2	0–0	1–0	4–1	1–2	0–1	2–1	1–1	2–0	5–1	3–0	2–0	0–2	—

Source: BDFútbol
Legend: Blue = home team win; Yellow = draw; Red = away team win.

=== Top goalscorers ===
Goalscorers	Goals	Team
(Spain) Miguel Ángel Lotina	21	Logroñés
(Spain) Jon García	18	Sestao
(Spain) Ramón Masqué	17	Gimnástico de Tarragona
(Spain) Ángel Giménez	17	Binéfar
(Spain) Marañón	16	Sabadell

=== Top goalkeepers ===
Goalkeeper	Goals	Matches	Average	Team
(Spain) Luciano Casado	19	29	0.66	Logroñés
(Spain) Tomás Cuenca	28	36	0.78	Alavés
(Spain) Joan Capó	31	38	0.82	Sabadell
(Spain) José Palomo	33	36	0.92	Gimnástico de Tarragona
(Spain) Francisco Javier Echevarría	33	34	0.97	Sestao

== Group II ==
Teams from Andalusia, Aragon, Balearic Islands, Castile and León, Castilla–La Mancha, Catalonia, Ceuta, Extremadura, Madrid, Region of Murcia and Valencian Community.

=== Teams ===
Location of teams in Segunda División B Gr. 2 1983–84

Team	Founded	Home city	Stadium
Albacete	1940	Albacete, Castilla–La Mancha	Carlos Belmonte
Alcalá	1923	Alcalá de Henares, Madrid	El Val
Alcoyano	1928	Alcoy, Valencian Community	El Collao
Antequerano	1939	Antequera, Andalusia	El Maulí
Badajoz	1905	Badajoz, Extremadura	Vivero
Calvo Sotelo	1948	Puertollano, Castilla–La Mancha	Empetrol
Ceuta	1970	Ceuta	Alfonso Murube
Córdoba	1954	Córdoba, Andalusia	El Árcangel
Deportivo Aragón	1958	Zaragoza, Aragon	Ciudad Deportiva del Real Zaragoza
Hospitalet	1957	L'Hospitalet de Llobregat, Catalonia	Municipal de Deportes
Ibiza	1956	Ibiza, Balearic Islands	Carrer Canàries
Real Jaén	1929	Jaén, Andalusia	La Victoria
Linense	1912	La Línea de la Concepción, Andalusia	Municipal La Línea de la Concepción
Lorca	1969	Lorca, Region of Murcia	San José
Parla	1973	Parla, Madrid	Los Prados
Poblense	1935	Sa Pobla, Balearic Islands	Nou Camp Sa Pobla
Portuense	1928	El Puerto de Santa María, Andalusia	José del Cuvillo
Talavera	1948	Talavera de la Reina, Castilla–La Mancha	El Prado
Xerez	1947	Jerez de la Frontera, Andalusia	Domecq
Zamora	1968	Zamora, Castile and León	Ramiro Ledesma

=== League table ===
Pos	Team	Pld	W	D	L	GF	GA	GD	Pts	Promotion or relegation
1	CF Lorca Deportiva	38	19	11	8	51	28	+23	49	Promoted to Segunda División
2	CF Calvo Sotelo	38	21	6	11	56	31	+25	48	Promoted to Segunda División
3	Real Jaén	38	19	9	10	66	44	+22	47	
4	CD Badajoz	38	20	5	13	42	30	+12	45	
5	Albacete Balompié	38	16	10	12	47	39	+8	42	
6	Xerez CD	38	16	10	12	53	41	+12	42	
7	RSD Alcalá	38	18	6	14	52	44	+8	42	
8	CD Alcoyano	38	15	10	13	52	49	+3	40	
9	AgD Ceuta	38	14	10	14	50	46	+4	38	
10	AD Parla	38	12	13	13	44	48	−4	37	
11	Dep. Aragón	38	15	6	17	49	48	+1	36	
12	UD Poblense	38	13	10	15	44	42	+2	36	
13	Zamora CF	38	14	7	17	32	38	−6	35	
14	Talavera CF	38	11	13	14	38	44	−6	35	
15	Balompédica Linense	38	14	7	17	52	71	−19	35	
16	CD Hospitalet	38	11	13	14	36	46	−10	35	
17	RC Portuense (Note: Racing Club Portuense was relegated to Tercera División due to financial problems)	38	13	9	16	38	51	−13	35	Relegated to Tercera División
18	CD Antequerano	38	15	4	19	44	52	−8	34	
19	Córdoba CF	38	8	11	19	30	57	−27	27	Relegated to Tercera División
20	SD Ibiza	38	5	12	21	31	58	−27	22	Relegated to Tercera División

Source: BDFútbol

=== Results ===
Home \ Away	ALB	ALA	ALC	ANT	BAD	CAL	CEU	COR	DAR	HOS	IBZ	JAE	LNS	LOR	PAR	POB	POR	TAL	XER	ZAM
Albacete	—	1–1	0–0	1–1	0–1	1–0	0–2	3–0	5–2	4–1	1–0	2–0	4–3	1–0	0–1	3–1	3–1	4–1	3–1	2–1
Alcalá	1–0	—	2–2	0–1	2–1	0–1	3–1	5–3	1–2	3–0	2–1	1–1	3–2	3–2	0–0	1–0	3–0	4–0	0–1	3–0
Alcoyano	0–0	2–0	—	4–0	2–4	0–2	2–1	4–0	2–1	4–1	4–0	0–4	0–3	1–2	1–1	1–0	1–1	3–0	2–1	1–0
Antequerano	3–0	0–1	4–0	—	2–0	1–0	2–0	1–0	2–1	2–1	2–1	0–2	3–4	1–1	2–0	1–2	2–1	0–1	0–1	3–0
Badajoz	1–0	2–0	0–1	1–0	—	1–0	0–0	1–0	2–0	3–1	1–0	2–0	0–1	3–2	2–0	1–0	1–0	1–0	3–0	1–0
Calvo Sotelo	2–1	0–1	1–2	2–0	2–1	—	3–0	1–0	4–1	1–0	3–1	3–1	5–0	1–0	3–0	4–2	2–3	1–0	1–0	2–1
Ceuta	5–0	1–1	3–2	1–1	2–0	1–1	—	2–1	0–1	0–2	0–3	1–0	8–0	0–1	4–0	2–2	3–1	2–0	2–1	0–2
Córdoba	0–0	0–0	1–2	3–2	0–0	0–0	1–2	—	2–1	3–1	0–0	0–0	3–2	1–3	0–3	2–1	0–0	1–0	0–0	0–0
Deportivo Aragón	3–2	1–2	1–2	1–0	1–1	2–0	1–1	2–0	—	0–0	1–0	2–1	4–2	0–0	1–0	3–1	3–0	2–1	3–0	3–0
Hospitalet	0–0	2–0	0–0	2–0	1–0	0–0	1–2	2–2	2–1	—	2–1	1–3	0–0	1–1	0–1	4–1	1–0	0–0	1–0	1–2
Ibiza	1–1	1–3	2–1	0–2	0–1	0–0	0–0	1–2	3–1	1–2	—	1–1	2–0	0–0	1–1	1–1	1–2	0–2	1–1	1–0
Jaén	1–1	2–0	2–0	1–2	2–1	3–2	4–1	2–1	2–1	2–2	1–0	—	6–1	1–0	3–3	1–1	6–0	3–1	2–1	0–0
Linense	2–0	4–1	1–0	4–2	1–0	1–2	4–0	2–1	1–1	1–1	3–0	1–2	—	0–1	2–2	2–1	2–0	2–1	0–5	0–0
Lorca	0–0	3–1	2–0	3–0	1–0	0–0	1–0	2–0	1–0	0–1	2–0	3–0	1–0	—	4–1	3–2	3–0	0–0	3–2	2–0
Parla	0–1	0–1	2–2	5–0	0–2	1–1	1–1	0–0	2–0	2–1	5–2	3–2	0–0	3–1	—	1–0	1–0	2–2	0–3	2–1
Poblense	0–0	0–1	2–0	1–0	3–0	1–0	2–0	6–1	1–0	1–1	3–0	1–0	2–0	1–1	0–0	—	2–1	0–0	0–2	1–0
Racing Portuense	1–0	2–1	0–0	3–0	2–1	2–1	1–0	2–0	1–1	0–0	2–2	0–1	4–0	1–1	2–0	0–0	—	2–2	0–4	1–0
Talavera	0–1	1–0	2–2	1–0	1–1	1–2	1–1	3–1	1–0	2–0	1–1	2–2	3–0	0–0	1–0	2–0	2–0	—	1–1	1–1
Xerez	1–2	3–1	1–1	1–1	3–2	2–1	0–1	1–0	1–0	0–0	2–2	3–1	1–1	1–1	2–1	1–1	0–2	1–0	—	3–1
Zamora	1–0	1–0	2–1	2–1	0–0	0–2	0–0	0–1	2–1	3–0	2–0	0–1	2–0	2–0	0–0	2–1	1–0	3–1	0–2	—

Source: BDFútbol
Legend: Blue = home team win; Yellow = draw; Red = away team win.

=== Top goalscorers ===
Goalscorers	Goals	Team
(Spain) Pepe Mel	30	Alcalá
(Spain) Argimiro Márquez	18	Linense
(Spain) Juan Carlos Plaza	16	Real Jaén
(Spain) Jesús Ayúcar	16	Talavera
(Spain) Antonio Rivera	15	Parla

=== Top goalkeepers ===
Goalkeeper	Goals	Matches	Average	Team
(Spain) Agapito Moncaleán	28	38	0.74	Algeciras
(Spain) Fernando Sánchez	31	38	0.82	Calvo Sotelo
(Spain) José María Olivares	31	31	1.00	Parla/Alcalá
(Spain) Vicente Merino	38	38	1.00	Zamora
(Spain) Juan Miguel Recio	34	33	1.03	Xerez
