= 1987–88 Segunda División B =

Season of third division football in Spain

Segunda División B
- Season: 1987–88
- Champions: Alzira; Eibar; Mollerussa; Salamanca
- Promoted: Alzira; Eibar; Mollerussa; Salamanca
- Relegated: Benidorm; Cacereño; Caudal; Cieza; Conquense; Constància; Daimiel; Gimnástica; Girona; Júpiter; Laredo; Las Palmas Atlético; Mirandés; Parla; Rayo Cantabria; Ronda; Valencia Mestalla
- Matches: 1,520
- Goals: 3,630 (2.39 per match)
- Top goalscorer: Xavier Escaich (25 goals)
- Best goalkeeper: Ángel Lozano (0.48 goals/match)
- Biggest home win: Ávila 10–0 Daimiel (13 March 1988)
- Biggest away win: Daimiel 0–8 Getafe (1 May 1988)
- Highest scoring: Daimiel 2–9 Plasencia (3 April 1988)
- Longest winning run: 12 matches Salamanca
- Longest unbeaten run: 28 matches Eibar
- Longest winless run: 31 matches Daimiel
- Longest losing run: 15 matches Daimiel

The 1987–88 Segunda División B season was the 11th since its establishment. The first matches of the season were played on 29 August 1987, and the season ended on 22 May 1988.

After one season without geographic groups, the division returned to group-based play, now with four groups instead of two. The four-group structure remained in place until 2021. The group champions were Eibar in Group 1, Mollerussa in Group 2, and Salamanca in Group 3, and Alzira in Group 4.

== Overview before the season ==
80 teams joined the league, including 63 promoted from the 1986–87 Tercera División after the expansion to four groups. No teams were relegated from the 1986–87 Segunda División. The composition of the groups was determined by the Royal Spanish Football Federation, attending to geographical criteria.

== Group 1 ==
Teams from Asturias, Basque Country, Cantabria, Castile and Leon and Galicia.

=== Teams ===
Location of teams in Segunda División B Gr. 1 1987–88

| Team | Founded | Home city | Stadium |
|---|---|---|---|
| Arenteiro | 1958 | O Carballiño, Galicia | Espiñedo |
| Arosa | 1945 | Vilagarcía de Arousa, Galicia | A Lomba |
| As Pontes | 1960 | As Pontes, Galicia | O Poboado |
| Real Avilés | 1903 | Avilés, Asturias | Román Suárez Puerta |
| Basconia | 1913 | Basauri, Basque Country | Basozelai |
| Bergantiños | 1923 | Carballo, Galicia | As Eiroas |
| Caudal | 1918 | Mieres, Asturias | Hermanos Antuña |
| Cultural Leonesa | 1923 | León, Castile and Leon | Antonio Amilvia |
| Durango | 1919 | Durango, Basque Country | Tabira |
| Eibar | 1940 | Eibar, Basque Country | Ipurua |
| Gimnástica de Torrelavega | 1943 | Torrelavega, Cantabria | El Malecón |
| Lalín | 1974 | Lalín, Galicia | Manuel Anxo Cortizo |
| Langreo | 1961 | Langreo, Asturias | Ganzábal |
| Laredo | 1918 | Laredo, Cantabria | San Lorenzo |
| Lemona | 1923 | Lemoa, Basque Country | Arlonagusia |
| Lugo | 1953 | Lugo, Galicia | Anxo Carro |
| Orense | 1952 | Ourense, Galicia | O Couto |
| Ponferradina | 1922 | Ponferrada, Castile and Leon | Fuentesnuevas |
| Pontevedra | 1941 | Pontevedra, Galicia | Pasarón |
| Rayo Cantabria | 1926 | Santander, Cantabria | El Sardinero |

=== League table ===
| Pos | Team | Pld | W | D | L | GF | GA | GD | Pts | Qualification or relegation |
|---|---|---|---|---|---|---|---|---|---|---|
| 1 | Eibar | 38 | 26 | 7 | 5 | 68 | 21 | +47 | 59 | Promotion to Segunda División |
| 2 | Avilés | 38 | 22 | 9 | 7 | 60 | 28 | +32 | 53 | |
| 3 | Ourense | 38 | 17 | 14 | 7 | 42 | 25 | +17 | 48 | |
| 4 | Ponferradina | 38 | 19 | 7 | 12 | 64 | 44 | +20 | 45 | |
| 5 | Pontevedra | 38 | 16 | 11 | 11 | 52 | 34 | +18 | 43 | |
| 6 | Baskonia | 38 | 15 | 12 | 11 | 44 | 34 | +10 | 42 | |
| 7 | Lemona | 38 | 14 | 13 | 11 | 33 | 31 | +2 | 41 | |
| 8 | Cultural Durango | 38 | 17 | 6 | 15 | 33 | 37 | −4 | 40 (Note: Durango finished ahead of Lugo on head-to-head goal difference: Lugo–Durango 0–2, Durango–Lugo 0–1) | |
| 9 | Lugo | 38 | 14 | 12 | 12 | 36 | 38 | −2 | 40 | |
| 10 | As Pontes | 38 | 17 | 5 | 16 | 40 | 42 | −2 | 39 | |
| 11 | Bergantiños | 38 | 14 | 9 | 15 | 39 | 41 | −2 | 37 (Note: Bergantiños finished ahead of Lalín on head-to-head points: Bergantiños–Lalín 3–1, Lalín–Bergantiños 0–1) | |
| 12 | Lalín | 38 | 12 | 13 | 13 | 39 | 43 | −4 | 37 | |
| 13 | Langreo | 38 | 14 | 8 | 16 | 47 | 43 | +4 | 36 | |
| 14 | Cultural Leonesa | 38 | 14 | 7 | 17 | 42 | 53 | −11 | 35 | |
| 15 | Arosa | 38 | 11 | 12 | 15 | 38 | 48 | −10 | 34 | |
| 16 | Arenteiro | 38 | 11 | 10 | 17 | 40 | 48 | −8 | 32 | |
| 17 | Laredo | 38 | 9 | 11 | 18 | 41 | 58 | −17 | 29 | Relegation to Tercera División |
| 18 | Caudal | 38 | 9 | 10 | 19 | 35 | 51 | −16 | 28 | Relegation to Tercera División |
| 19 | Rayo Cantabria | 38 | 7 | 9 | 22 | 32 | 60 | −28 | 23 | Relegation to Tercera División |
| 20 | Gimnástica Torrelavega | 38 | 4 | 11 | 23 | 16 | 62 | −46 | 19 | Relegation to Tercera División |

Source: BDFútbol
Rules for classification: 1) points; 2) head-to-head points; 3) head-to-head goal difference; 4) goal difference; 5) number of goals scored

=== Results ===
| Home \ Away | ARE | ARO | ASP | AVI | BAS | BER | CAU | CUL | DUR | EIB | GIM | LAL | LAN | LAR | LEM | LUG | ORE | PNF | PNT | RAY |
|---|---|---|---|---|---|---|---|---|---|---|---|---|---|---|---|---|---|---|---|---|
| Arenteiro | — | 2–0 | 1–0 | 1–1 | 0–1 | 2–3 | 0–0 | 2–1 | 2–1 | 0–1 | 1–0 | 2–1 | 0–2 | 3–0 | 0–1 | 0–0 | 0–0 | 4–1 | 0–1 | 4–1 |
| Arosa | 1–1 | — | 0–0 | 2–5 | 0–0 | 1–1 | 1–1 | 3–2 | 1–0 | 1–1 | 3–0 | 1–3 | 2–0 | 2–2 | 0–0 | 4–1 | 0–2 | 1–0 | 0–0 | 2–1 |
| As Pontes | 1–0 | 0–1 | — | 1–0 | 2–0 | 0–0 | 1–0 | 0–2 | 0–1 | 0–2 | 6–0 | 1–0 | 4–1 | 4–2 | 1–0 | 1–0 | 0–0 | 0–4 | 1–0 | 0–0 |
| Avilés | 2–1 | 3–1 | 1–2 | — | 2–0 | 2–2 | 3–0 | 2–1 | 1–1 | 1–0 | 4–0 | 4–0 | 0–0 | 2–1 | 2–0 | 2–0 | 2–0 | 3–0 | 1–1 | 1–0 |
| Basconia | 1–0 | 2–0 | 5–2 | 0–1 | — | 1–1 | 3–1 | 1–0 | 6–0 | 2–3 | 2–0 | 1–1 | 2–0 | 0–0 | 2–2 | 2–0 | 0–1 | 1–0 | 2–1 | 1–0 |
| Bergantiños | 0–1 | 0–1 | 2–1 | 1–1 | 1–0 | — | 3–0 | 3–0 | 0–1 | 1–0 | 3–2 | 3–1 | 0–3 | 0–0 | 0–1 | 0–1 | 0–1 | 0–0 | 1–3 | 2–0 |
| Caudal | 3–3 | 1–2 | 0–2 | 0–1 | 6–0 | 1–1 | — | 1–0 | 2–0 | 1–1 | 1–0 | 4–1 | 1–2 | 2–0 | 1–0 | 0–0 | 0–0 | 0–2 | 3–1 | 1–1 |
| Cultural Leonesa | 2–2 | 1–0 | 3–1 | 2–1 | 1–1 | 0–1 | 3–2 | — | 2–0 | 0–1 | 1–0 | 1–1 | 3–2 | 2–0 | 1–0 | 2–2 | 0–0 | 1–2 | 0–0 | 2–0 |
| Durango | 1–0 | 0–0 | 1–0 | 1–1 | 1–0 | 1–0 | 1–0 | 1–0 | — | 0–1 | 2–0 | 1–1 | 1–2 | 3–1 | 1–0 | 0–1 | 2–0 | 0–0 | 1–0 | 2–0 |
| Eibar | 4–1 | 4–1 | 0–2 | 1–0 | 2–1 | 2–0 | 3–0 | 5–0 | 2–1 | — | 1–0 | 6–0 | 3–0 | 2–2 | 5–0 | 1–0 | 1–0 | 3–0 | 4–2 | 2–0 |
| Gimn. Torrelavega | 1–0 | 2–0 | 0–0 | 0–1 | 1–1 | 2–1 | 0–0 | 0–1 | 0–1 | 0–1 | — | 1–3 | 2–1 | 0–2 | 1–2 | 1–1 | 0–0 | 1–2 | 0–0 | 0–0 |
| Lalín | 1–0 | 0–0 | 0–2 | 0–0 | 0–0 | 0–1 | 2–0 | 2–0 | 3–0 | 2–0 | 0–0 | — | 1–1 | 3–0 | 2–0 | 0–0 | 1–2 | 2–0 | 0–0 | 3–2 |
| Langreo | 0–1 | 1–1 | 3–1 | 1–2 | 0–1 | 1–2 | 3–1 | 1–0 | 2–0 | 0–2 | 5–1 | 1–1 | — | 3–0 | 0–0 | 0–1 | 3–0 | 2–2 | 1–0 | 1–0 |
| Laredo | 3–0 | 0–2 | 1–2 | 1–2 | 0–0 | 1–1 | 2–0 | 2–1 | 0–1 | 0–0 | 3–0 | 1–0 | 1–1 | — | 1–0 | 2–2 | 0–2 | 3–3 | 0–1 | 4–0 |
| Lemona | 1–1 | 1–0 | 1–0 | 3–1 | 1–1 | 2–1 | 2–1 | 0–2 | 0–0 | 0–0 | 1–1 | 2–0 | 1–1 | 4–1 | — | 2–0 | 0–1 | 0–0 | 1–1 | 0–1 |
| Lugo | 1–1 | 2–0 | 3–1 | 1–0 | 0–0 | 1–0 | 1–0 | 1–1 | 0–2 | 0–0 | 2–0 | 1–2 | 1–0 | 3–1 | 0–1 | — | 0–0 | 4–1 | 1–2 | 2–1 |
| Orense | 1–1 | 2–0 | 0–1 | 0–2 | 1–1 | 4–0 | 1–0 | 2–3 | 1–0 | 1–1 | 4–0 | 1–1 | 1–0 | 0–0 | 1–1 | 4–1 | — | 2–1 | 2–1 | 2–0 |
| Ponferradina | 6–3 | 3–2 | 2–0 | 1–0 | 1–0 | 2–0 | 0–1 | 3–0 | 4–2 | 1–0 | 6–0 | 2–0 | 2–0 | 3–1 | 0–2 | 0–1 | 0–1 | — | 2–1 | 1–1 |
| Pontevedra | 3–0 | 1–0 | 2–0 | 1–1 | 2–1 | 0–2 | 5–0 | 6–0 | 3–2 | 1–2 | 0–0 | 1–0 | 1–3 | 3–0 | 0–0 | 3–0 | 0–0 | 0–0 | — | 3–2 |
| Rayo Cantabria | 1–0 | 3–2 | 4–0 | 1–2 | 0–2 | 1–2 | 0–0 | 2–1 | 1–0 | 0–1 | 0–0 | 1–1 | 1–0 | 1–3 | 0–1 | 1–1 | 2–2 | 2–7 | 1–2 | — |

Source: BDFútbol
Legend: Blue = home team win; Yellow = draw; Red = away team win.

=== Top goalscorers ===
| Goalscorers | Goals | Team |
|---|---|---|
| (Spain) José Antonio Velázquez | 21 | Avilés |
| (Spain) Juan Carlos González | 16 | Langreo |
| (Spain) Juan Carlos Gómez de Segura | 15 | Eibar |
| (Spain) Joaquín Alonso | 15 | Avilés |
| (Spain) Paquito | 15 | Ponferradina |

=== Top goalkeepers ===
| Goalkeeper | Goals | Matches | Average | Team |
|---|---|---|---|---|
| (Spain) Fermín Hortas | 21 | 32 | 0.66 | Ourense |
| (Spain) Camuel | 21 | 29 | 0.72 | Avilés |
| (Spain) Eugenio Lozano | 25 | 30 | 0.83 | Lemona |
| (Spain) Javier Elola | 31 | 36 | 0.86 | Durango |
| (Spain) Juan Antonio Tinoko | 34 | 38 | 0.89 | Baskonia |

== Group 2 ==
Teams from Andorra, Aragon, Basque Country, Balearic Islands, Castile and Leon, Catalonia, La Rioja and Navarre.

=== Teams ===
Location of teams in Segunda División B Gr. 2 1987–88

| Team | Founded | Home city | Stadium |
|---|---|---|---|
| Andorra CF | 1957 | Andorra, Aragon | Juan Antonio Endeiza |
| FC Andorra | 1942 | Andorra la Vella, Andorra | Comunal |
| Arnedo | 1949 | Arnedo, La Rioja | Sendero |
| Atlético Baleares | 1942 | Palma de Mallorca, Balearic Islands | Balear |
| Barcelona Aficionados | 1967 | Barcelona, Catalonia | Mini Estadi |
| Cala Millor | 1933 | Cala Millor, Balearic Islands | Badía Cala Millor |
| Constància | 1922 | Inca, Balearic Islands | Nou Camp d'Inca |
| Deportivo Aragón | 1958 | Zaragoza, Aragon | Ciudad Deportiva del Real Zaragoza |
| Fraga | 1947 | Fraga, Aragon | La Estacada |
| Gimnàstic de Tarragona | 1886 | Tarragona, Catalonia | Nou Estadi |
| Girona | 1930 | Girona, Catalonia | Montilivi |
| Hospitalet | 1957 | L'Hospitalet de Llobregat, Catalonia | Municipal de Deportes |
| Júpiter | 1909 | Barcelona, Catalonia | La Verneda |
| Sporting Mahonés | 1974 | Mahón, Balearic Islands | Bintaufa |
| Mirandés | 1927 | Miranda de Ebro, Castile and Leon | Anduva |
| Mollerussa | 1930 | Mollerussa, Catalonia | Municipal |
| Osasuna Promesas | 1962 | Aranguren, Navarre | Tajonar |
| Poblense | 1935 | Sa Pobla, Balearic Islands | Nou Camp Sa Pobla |
| San Sebastián | 1951 | San Sebastián, Basque Country | Atotxa |
| Terrassa | 1906 | Terrassa, Catalonia | Olímpic de Terrassa |

=== League table ===
| Pos | Team | Pld | W | D | L | GF | GA | GD | Pts | Qualification or relegation |
|---|---|---|---|---|---|---|---|---|---|---|
| 1 | Mollerussa | 38 | 20 | 12 | 6 | 57 | 32 | +25 | 52 (Note: Mollerussa finished ahead of Deportivo Aragón on head-to-head goal difference: Deportivo Aragón–Mollerussa 2–1, Mollerussa–Deportivo Aragón 2–0) | Promotion to Segunda División |
| 2 | Deportivo Aragón | 38 | 23 | 6 | 9 | 69 | 44 | +25 | 52 | |
| 3 | Terrassa | 38 | 15 | 16 | 7 | 52 | 39 | +13 | 46 (Note: Terrassa finished ahead of Andorra on head-to-head points: Terrassa–Andorra 1–0, Andorra–Terrassa 1–1) | |
| 4 | Andorra | 38 | 18 | 10 | 10 | 54 | 38 | +16 | 46 | |
| 5 | L'Hospitalet | 38 | 17 | 11 | 10 | 52 | 35 | +17 | 45 | |
| 6 | San Sebastián | 38 | 13 | 16 | 9 | 61 | 39 | +22 | 42 | |
| 7 | Arnedo | 38 | 14 | 12 | 12 | 45 | 52 | −7 | 40 | |
| 8 | Gimnàstic | 38 | 13 | 13 | 12 | 57 | 42 | +15 | 39 | |
| 9 | Barcelona Aficionados | 38 | 14 | 9 | 15 | 60 | 57 | +3 | 37 | |
| 10 | Fraga | 38 | 11 | 14 | 13 | 39 | 57 | −18 | 36 (Note: Fraga finished ahead of Osasuna B on head-to-head points: Fraga–Osasuna B 1–0, Osasuna B–Fraga 0–1) | |
| 11 | Osasuna Promesas | 38 | 13 | 10 | 15 | 52 | 48 | +4 | 36 | |
| 12 | Atlético Baleares | 38 | 13 | 9 | 16 | 42 | 46 | −4 | 35 (Note: Atlético Baleares finished ahead of FC Andorra and Sporting Mahonés on head-to-head goal difference) | |
| 13 | FC Andorra | 38 | 11 | 13 | 14 | 47 | 44 | +3 | 35 | |
| 14 | Sporting Mahonés | 38 | 12 | 11 | 15 | 39 | 52 | −13 | 35 | |
| 15 | Poblense | 38 | 10 | 14 | 14 | 46 | 55 | −9 | 34 | |
| 16 | Cala Millor | 38 | 10 | 13 | 15 | 35 | 55 | −20 | 33 | |
| 17 | Constància | 38 | 13 | 6 | 19 | 40 | 54 | −14 | 32 | Relegation to Tercera División |
| 18 | Mirandés | 38 | 12 | 7 | 19 | 49 | 68 | −19 | 31 | Relegation to Tercera División |
| 19 | Girona | 38 | 8 | 14 | 16 | 50 | 56 | −6 | 30 | Relegation to Tercera División |
| 20 | Júpiter | 38 | 7 | 10 | 21 | 32 | 65 | −33 | 24 | Relegation to Tercera División |

Source: BDFútbol
Rules for classification: 1) points; 2) head-to-head points; 3) head-to-head goal difference; 4) goal difference; 5) number of goals scored

=== Results ===
| Home \ Away | AND | FCA | ARN | BAL | BAR | CAM | CON | DAR | FRA | GIM | GIR | HOS | JUP | MAH | MIR | MOL | OSA | POB | SSE | TER |
|---|---|---|---|---|---|---|---|---|---|---|---|---|---|---|---|---|---|---|---|---|
| Andorra CF | — | 1–0 | 4–0 | 1–2 | 3–1 | 0–0 | 1–0 | 2–1 | 3–1 | 1–0 | 2–0 | 2–0 | 3–0 | 4–0 | 1–0 | 3–2 | 1–4 | 3–2 | 0–0 | 1–1 |
| FC Andorra | 1–2 | — | 7–0 | 0–1 | 2–1 | 2–0 | 0–2 | 2–1 | 1–1 | 1–2 | 1–0 | 0–0 | 1–1 | 1–1 | 3–1 | 0–2 | 0–2 | 2–0 | 1–0 | 1–1 |
| Arnedo | 1–0 | 1–0 | — | 4–1 | 0–0 | 3–1 | 0–0 | 3–0 | 2–2 | 0–0 | 3–1 | 1–3 | 3–1 | 1–0 | 3–0 | 0–1 | 2–0 | 3–3 | 1–1 | 2–0 |
| Atlético Baleares | 1–0 | 1–2 | 0–0 | — | 0–0 | 3–0 | 3–2 | 0–1 | 2–1 | 4–1 | 0–0 | 1–0 | 1–1 | 3–0 | 2–0 | 1–2 | 0–0 | 0–0 | 0–0 | 1–1 |
| Barcelona Afic. | 1–1 | 2–4 | 3–0 | 2–0 | — | 3–0 | 1–0 | 1–3 | 0–0 | 3–2 | 2–2 | 0–1 | 4–0 | 3–0 | 3–0 | 1–2 | 2–1 | 2–2 | 5–0 | 0–2 |
| Cala Millor | 2–1 | 0–0 | 1–0 | 2–1 | 0–1 | — | 1–3 | 1–4 | 1–0 | 1–3 | 4–1 | 0–0 | 1–1 | 0–0 | 4–2 | 1–0 | 1–1 | 2–2 | 2–0 | 1–1 |
| Constancia | 2–0 | 1–0 | 1–2 | 1–0 | 2–1 | 1–1 | — | 2–3 | 1–0 | 1–0 | 1–1 | 1–3 | 2–1 | 1–3 | 3–2 | 0–2 | 3–0 | 1–1 | 2–1 | 3–2 |
| Deportivo Aragón | 2–2 | 1–0 | 2–1 | 3–4 | 3–1 | 2–0 | 2–1 | — | 3–1 | 2–0 | 3–2 | 1–0 | 2–1 | 1–0 | 7–1 | 2–1 | 1–1 | 1–0 | 3–2 | 0–2 |
| Fraga | 2–2 | 0–2 | 1–0 | 1–1 | 2–2 | 1–0 | 2–0 | 0–5 | — | 1–1 | 3–0 | 1–4 | 3–2 | 2–0 | 1–1 | 1–1 | 1–0 | 1–0 | 1–1 | 1–1 |
| Gimnàstic | 2–2 | 2–2 | 0–0 | 3–0 | 2–2 | 4–0 | 4–0 | 0–1 | 7–0 | — | 2–2 | 1–2 | 4–1 | 2–0 | 3–1 | 0–1 | 1–0 | 3–2 | 2–0 | 1–1 |
| Girona | 3–1 | 0–0 | 1–1 | 4–0 | 2–2 | 1–0 | 3–0 | 5–1 | 1–1 | 0–0 | — | 1–1 | 3–1 | 3–1 | 0–1 | 0–0 | 1–1 | 1–2 | 1–2 | 0–1 |
| Hospitalet | 0–1 | 1–1 | 2–3 | 2–1 | 3–2 | 0–1 | 2–1 | 1–3 | 4–0 | 1–0 | 2–0 | — | 1–0 | 3–0 | 3–0 | 2–1 | 0–1 | 2–1 | 1–1 | 3–3 |
| Júpiter | 0–1 | 2–2 | 0–1 | 1–3 | 0–3 | 0–0 | 0–0 | 1–0 | 1–2 | 0–0 | 2–1 | 0–0 | — | 4–2 | 3–2 | 0–1 | 1–2 | 1–0 | 2–2 | 1–0 |
| Sporting Mahonés | 0–0 | 2–2 | 1–1 | 3–2 | 1–0 | 0–0 | 1–0 | 0–0 | 2–1 | 4–0 | 3–1 | 1–0 | 0–1 | — | 2–1 | 1–1 | 2–1 | 0–0 | 2–1 | 0–1 |
| Mirandés | 0–2 | 2–1 | 1–1 | 2–1 | 4–2 | 2–1 | 1–0 | 2–0 | 3–0 | 1–1 | 2–1 | 1–1 | 4–0 | 3–2 | — | 2–2 | 1–1 | 0–1 | 1–2 | 3–0 |
| Mollerussa | 0–0 | 2–1 | 2–1 | 3–1 | 4–0 | 1–2 | 1–1 | 2–0 | 1–1 | 1–1 | 3–2 | 0–0 | 2–1 | 0–0 | 2–0 | — | 3–0 | 2–0 | 1–1 | 2–0 |
| Osasuna Prom. | 3–1 | 2–2 | 5–0 | 1–0 | 2–3 | 3–0 | 1–0 | 0–3 | 0–1 | 1–2 | 1–2 | 1–0 | 2–0 | 4–1 | 0–0 | 1–2 | — | 1–1 | 2–2 | 4–0 |
| Poblense | 3–2 | 1–1 | 0–0 | 1–0 | 4–0 | 2–2 | 2–1 | 1–1 | 1–2 | 2–1 | 1–1 | 1–2 | 1–0 | 0–3 | 2–1 | 2–3 | 2–1 | — | 1–1 | 0–2 |
| San Sebastián | 0–0 | 3–1 | 3–1 | 0–1 | 0–1 | 5–1 | 2–0 | 0–0 | 0–0 | 0–0 | 4–2 | 1–1 | 5–0 | 1–1 | 5–1 | 2–0 | 4–0 | 4–0 | — | 4–0 |
| Terrassa | 1–0 | 2–0 | 4–0 | 1–0 | 3–0 | 1–1 | 4–0 | 1–1 | 1–0 | 1–0 | 1–1 | 1–1 | 1–1 | 3–0 | 2–0 | 1–1 | 2–2 | 2–2 | 1–1 | — |

Source: BDFútbol
Legend: Blue = home team win; Yellow = draw; Red = away team win.

=== Top goalscorers ===
| Goalscorers | Goals | Team |
|---|---|---|
| (Spain) Xavier Escaich | 25 | Gimnàstic |
| (Spain) Jon Igoa | 19 | San Sebastián |
| (Spain) Antonio Maya | 17 | L'Hospitalet |
| (Spain) Joan Blanquera | 17 | Barcelona C |
| (Spain) Martín Abad | 16 | Girona |

=== Top goalkeepers ===
| Goalkeeper | Goals | Matches | Average | Team |
|---|---|---|---|---|
| (Spain) José Luis Artigas | 32 | 35 | 0.91 | Andorra |
| (Spain) José del Río | 35 | 38 | 0.92 | L'Hospitalet |
| (Spain) Enric Coch | 40 | 37 | 1.08 | Gimnàstic |
| (Spain) Laureano Echevarría | 41 | 36 | 1.14 | Deportivo Aragón |
| (Spain) José Antonio Arévalo | 40 | 35 | 1.14 | FC Andorra |

== Group 3 ==
Teams from Andalusia, Canary Islands, Castile and Leon, Castilla–La Mancha, Extremadura and Madrid.

=== Teams ===
Location of teams in Segunda División B Gr. 3 1987–88
Canary Islands

| Team | Founded | Home city | Stadium |
|---|---|---|---|
| Alcalá | 1923 | Alcalá de Henares, Madrid | El Val |
| Atlético Madrileño | 1969 | Madrid, Madrid | Vicente Calderón |
| Real Ávila | 1923 | Ávila, Castile and Leon | Adolfo Suárez |
| Badajoz | 1905 | Badajoz, Extremadura | Vivero |
| Betis Deportivo | 1962 | Seville, Andalusia | Benito Villamarín |
| Cacereño | 1919 | Cáceres, Extremadura | Príncipe Felipe |
| Córdoba | 1954 | Córdoba, Andalusia | El Arcángel |
| Daimiel | 1942 | Daimiel, Castilla–La Mancha | Municipal |
| Getafe | 1983 | Getafe, Madrid | Las Margaritas |
| Las Palmas Atlético | 1959 | Las Palmas, Canary Islands | Insular |
| Leganés | 1928 | Leganés, Madrid | Luis Rodríguez de Miguel |
| Linares | 1961 | Linares, Andalusia | Linarejos |
| Maspalomas | 1969 | San Bartolomé de Tirajana, Canary Islands | Ciudad Deportiva Maspalomas |
| Parla | 1973 | Parla, Madrid | Los Prados |
| Plasencia | 1941 | Plasencia, Extremadura | Ciudad Deportiva |
| Salamanca | 1923 | Salamanca, Castile and León | Helmántico |
| San Sebastián de los Reyes | 1971 | San Sebastián de los Reyes, Madrid | Matapiñonera |
| Atlético Sanluqueño | 1948 | Sanlúcar de Barrameda, Andalusia | El Palmar |
| Sevilla Atlético | 1950 | Seville, Andalusia | Viejo Nervión |
| Telde | 1965 | Telde, Canary Islands | El Hornillo |

=== League table ===
| Pos | Team | Pld | W | D | L | GF | GA | GD | Pts | Qualification or relegation |
|---|---|---|---|---|---|---|---|---|---|---|
| 1 | Salamanca | 38 | 25 | 7 | 6 | 60 | 20 | +40 | 57 | Promotion to Segunda División |
| 2 | Badajoz | 38 | 20 | 9 | 9 | 50 | 36 | +14 | 49 | |
| 3 | Getafe | 38 | 18 | 11 | 9 | 71 | 41 | +30 | 47 | |
| 4 | Maspalomas | 38 | 19 | 7 | 12 | 46 | 32 | +14 | 45 | |
| 5 | Córdoba | 38 | 15 | 13 | 10 | 47 | 37 | +10 | 43 | |
| 6 | Linares | 38 | 17 | 8 | 13 | 74 | 45 | +29 | 42 (Note: Linares finished ahead of Leganés, Ávila and Alcalá on head-to-head points: Linares 9 pts, Leganés 8 pts, Ávila 7 pts, Alcalá 3pts) | |
| 7 | Leganés | 38 | 16 | 10 | 12 | 54 | 39 | +15 | 42 | |
| 8 | Ávila | 38 | 15 | 12 | 11 | 58 | 38 | +20 | 42 | |
| 9 | Alcalá | 38 | 14 | 14 | 10 | 45 | 47 | −2 | 42 | |
| 10 | Telde | 38 | 16 | 9 | 13 | 54 | 50 | +4 | 41 | |
| 11 | Atlético Madrileño | 38 | 12 | 15 | 11 | 51 | 37 | +14 | 39 | |
| 12 | Sevilla Atlético | 38 | 11 | 14 | 13 | 38 | 38 | 0 | 36 | |
| 13 | San Sebastián de los Reyes | 38 | 11 | 13 | 14 | 33 | 42 | −9 | 35 | |
| 14 | Betis Deportivo | 38 | 13 | 8 | 17 | 55 | 43 | +12 | 34 (Note: Betis Deportivo finished ahead of Atlético Sanluqueño on head-to-head points: Betis Deportivo–Atlético Sanluqueño 1–0, Atlético Sanluqueño–Betis Deportivo 0–0) | |
| 15 | Atlético Sanluqueño | 38 | 11 | 12 | 15 | 44 | 49 | −5 | 34 | |
| 16 | Plasencia | 38 | 10 | 13 | 15 | 38 | 43 | −5 | 33 (Note: Plasencia finished ahead of Las Palmas Atlético on overall goal difference) | |
| 17 | Las Palmas Atlético | 38 | 10 | 13 | 15 | 32 | 49 | −17 | 33 | Relegation to Tercera División |
| 18 | Parla | 38 | 9 | 10 | 19 | 29 | 70 | −41 | 28 | Relegation to Tercera División |
| 19 | Cacereño | 38 | 7 | 13 | 18 | 29 | 53 | −24 | 27 | Relegation to Tercera División |
| 20 | Daimiel | 38 | 2 | 7 | 29 | 19 | 118 | −99 | 11 | Relegation to Tercera División |

Source: BDFútbol
Rules for classification: 1) points; 2) head-to-head points; 3) head-to-head goal difference; 4) goal difference; 5) number of goals scored

=== Results ===
| Home \ Away | ALC | ATM | AVI | BAD | BET | CAC | COR | DAI | GET | LPA | LEG | LIN | MAS | PAR | PLA | SAL | SSR | SLU | SAT | TEL |
|---|---|---|---|---|---|---|---|---|---|---|---|---|---|---|---|---|---|---|---|---|
| Alcalá | — | 1–0 | 0–0 | 4–0 | 1–0 | 0–0 | 1–0 | 1–0 | 1–1 | 1–0 | 1–1 | 0–0 | 3–0 | 0–0 | 0–2 | 1–2 | 2–2 | 4–0 | 2–1 | 3–2 |
| At. Madrileño | 1–1 | — | 1–1 | 1–1 | 0–3 | 1–0 | 1–1 | 5–2 | 4–1 | 3–1 | 2–0 | 2–1 | 0–1 | 1–1 | 0–0 | 0–0 | 0–0 | 0–0 | 0–0 | 0–0 |
| Ávila | 5–0 | 1–3 | — | 2–1 | 2–0 | 1–0 | 3–0 | 10–0 | 2–2 | 0–0 | 1–0 | 2–1 | 1–0 | 0–1 | 4–0 | 1–3 | 1–1 | 2–0 | 3–0 | 0–1 |
| Badajoz | 2–1 | 1–0 | 2–0 | — | 2–1 | 2–1 | 0–1 | 2–0 | 1–1 | 0–0 | 1–0 | 4–1 | 1–0 | 0–0 | 3–0 | 0–1 | 1–0 | 3–2 | 1–0 | 1–1 |
| Betis Deportivo | 0–0 | 2–1 | 1–1 | 1–1 | — | 4–0 | 2–1 | 5–1 | 2–2 | 2–0 | 5–1 | 1–2 | 0–1 | 0–0 | 0–2 | 3–1 | 2–0 | 1–0 | 0–1 | 4–0 |
| Cacereño | 0–2 | 1–1 | 1–1 | 2–3 | 0–0 | — | 0–0 | 2–2 | 2–0 | 1–0 | 0–3 | 1–1 | 0–0 | 2–1 | 2–2 | 0–2 | 2–1 | 2–3 | 1–1 | 2–0 |
| Córdoba | 4–2 | 1–2 | 2–1 | 1–3 | 0–0 | 1–0 | — | 5–0 | 0–0 | 2–0 | 1–1 | 3–1 | 1–0 | 3–2 | 2–0 | 0–0 | 1–1 | 2–1 | 1–1 | 1–1 |
| Daimiel | 1–3 | 0–4 | 0–1 | 2–0 | 0–4 | 1–1 | 0–3 | — | 0–8 | 0–0 | 0–0 | 0–2 | 1–1 | 0–1 | 2–9 | 1–3 | 0–0 | 1–2 | 1–0 | 0–2 |
| Getafe | 2–2 | 1–0 | 3–1 | 3–0 | 2–1 | 0–0 | 1–2 | 5–1 | — | 3–0 | 1–2 | 2–0 | 0–0 | 6–1 | 2–1 | 0–0 | 3–1 | 1–3 | 3–0 | 2–0 |
| Las Palmas Atl. | 1–1 | 2–2 | 0–3 | 2–0 | 3–2 | 4–1 | 2–0 | 1–1 | 2–2 | — | 3–1 | 1–0 | 1–0 | 0–2 | 0–0 | 1–2 | 0–0 | 2–0 | 1–1 | 2–0 |
| Leganés | 6–0 | 2–1 | 2–0 | 0–1 | 0–3 | 3–0 | 2–1 | 6–0 | 1–0 | 0–0 | — | 2–2 | 2–0 | 1–1 | 3–1 | 1–0 | 2–0 | 1–1 | 0–0 | 2–0 |
| Linares | 4–1 | 2–1 | 3–0 | 2–2 | 5–3 | 0–1 | 0–1 | 5–1 | 5–1 | 5–0 | 1–1 | — | 0–1 | 4–0 | 1–1 | 3–0 | 0–1 | 5–2 | 4–1 | 2–0 |
| Maspalomas | 1–0 | 1–0 | 4–1 | 0–0 | 2–1 | 1–0 | 1–0 | 5–0 | 0–2 | 7–0 | 1–0 | 3–0 | — | 2–1 | 1–1 | 1–0 | 2–0 | 1–0 | 3–1 | 0–3 |
| Parla | 0–0 | 1–5 | 1–3 | 0–4 | 1–0 | 2–1 | 2–1 | 1–0 | 1–5 | 0–0 | 0–3 | 1–4 | 3–1 | — | 1–0 | 0–1 | 1–2 | 1–3 | 1–1 | 0–0 |
| Plasencia | 1–2 | 0–2 | 2–1 | 0–1 | 1–0 | 2–1 | 0–0 | 2–0 | 1–2 | 1–1 | 1–2 | 0–1 | 2–1 | 2–0 | — | 0–1 | 1–0 | 1–1 | 0–0 | 1–1 |
| Salamanca | 0–0 | 3–1 | 0–0 | 0–1 | 2–0 | 4–0 | 1–1 | 6–0 | 2–0 | 2–1 | 2–1 | 1–0 | 2–0 | 2–0 | 0–0 | — | 4–0 | 2–0 | 3–0 | 2–0 |
| San Sebast. Reyes | 0–0 | 1–1 | 0–0 | 1–1 | 3–2 | 0–0 | 1–1 | 4–0 | 0–3 | 2–0 | 1–0 | 1–0 | 4–1 | 1–1 | 1–0 | 0–1 | — | 1–0 | 0–2 | 1–0 |
| Atlético Sanluqueño | 2–0 | 0–0 | 0–0 | 1–3 | 0–0 | 2–0 | 0–0 | 4–0 | 0–1 | 0–1 | 0–0 | 2–2 | 1–1 | 1–0 | 4–1 | 1–3 | 3–1 | — | 0–0 | 2–2 |
| Sevilla Atlético | 1–2 | 2–1 | 0–0 | 1–0 | 1–0 | 0–1 | 2–3 | 2–0 | 0–0 | 1–0 | 4–1 | 1–1 | 0–0 | 7–0 | 0–0 | 0–1 | 2–1 | 2–0 | — | 2–2 |
| Telde | 5–2 | 1–4 | 3–3 | 3–1 | 3–0 | 2–1 | 2–0 | 3–1 | 2–0 | 1–0 | 3–1 | 0–4 | 0–2 | 4–0 | 0–0 | 2–1 | 2–0 | 2–3 | 1–0 | — |

Source: BDFútbol
Legend: Blue = home team win; Yellow = draw; Red = away team win.

=== Top goalscorers ===
| Goalscorers | Goals | Team |
|---|---|---|
| (Spain) Juan Antonio Anquela | 21 | Linares |
| (Spain) Antonio Rivera | 20 | Getafe |
| (Spain) Carles | 18 | Linares |
| (Spain) Totó | 16 | Córdoba |
| (Spain) Vicky | 15 | Badajoz |

=== Top goalkeepers ===
| Goalkeeper | Goals | Matches | Average | Team |
|---|---|---|---|---|
| (Spain) Ángel Lozano | 14 | 29 | 0.48 | Salamanca |
| (Spain) Javi Jiménez | 26 | 31 | 0.84 | Ávila |
| (Spain) Álvaro González | 30 | 33 | 0.91 | Maspalomas |
| (Spain) José Luis Burgueña | 29 | 30 | 0.97 | Córdoba |
| (Spain) Pedro Clavijo | 36 | 37 | 0.97 | Badajoz |

== Group 4 ==
Teams from Andalusia, Aragon, Castilla–La Mancha, Ceuta, Melilla, Region of Murcia and Valencian Community.

=== Teams ===
Location of teams in Segunda División B Gr. 4 1987–88

| Team | Founded | Home city | Stadium |
|---|---|---|---|
| Albacete | 1940 | Albacete, Castilla–La Mancha | Carlos Belmonte |
| Alcoyano | 1928 | Alcoy, Valencian Community | El Collao |
| Polideportivo Almería | 1983 | Almería, Andalusia | Municipal |
| Alzira | 1946 | Alzira, Valencian Community | Luis Suñer Picó |
| Benidorm | 1964 | Benidorm, Valencian Community | Foietes |
| Ceuta | 1970 | Ceuta | Alfonso Murube |
| Cieza | 1970 | Cieza, Region of Murcia | La Arboleja |
| Conquense | 1946 | Cuenca, Castilla–La Mancha | La Fuensanta |
| Eldense | 1921 | Elda, Valencian Community | Pepico Amat |
| Gandía | 1947 | Gandia, Valencian Community | Guillermo Olagüe |
| Levante | 1909 | Valencia, Valencian Community | Nou Estadi Llevant |
| Linense | 1912 | La Línea de la Concepción, Andalusia | Municipal La Línea de la Concepción |
| Lorca | 1969 | Lorca, Region of Murcia | San José |
| Marbella | 1947 | Marbella, Andalusia | Municipal de Marbella |
| Melilla | 1976 | Melilla | Álvarez Claro |
| Mestalla | 1944 | Valencia, Valencian Community | Luis Casanova |
| Olímpic de Xàtiva | 1932 | Xàtiva, Valencian Community | La Murta |
| Ronda | 1923 | Ronda, Andalusia | Ciudad Deportiva |
| Teruel | 1954 | Teruel, Aragon | Pinilla |
| Villarreal | 1923 | Villarreal, Valencian Community | El Madrigal |

=== League table ===
| Pos | Team | Pld | W | D | L | GF | GA | GD | Pts | Qualification or relegation |
|---|---|---|---|---|---|---|---|---|---|---|
| 1 | Alzira | 38 | 20 | 12 | 6 | 52 | 30 | +22 | 52 | Promotion to Segunda División |
| 2 | Villarreal | 38 | 18 | 12 | 8 | 60 | 38 | +22 | 48 (Note: Villarreal finished ahead of Albacete and Olímpic on head-to-head points: Villarreal 8 pts, Albacete 4 pts, Olímpic 0 pts) | |
| 3 | Albacete | 38 | 21 | 6 | 11 | 67 | 36 | +31 | 48 | |
| 4 | Olímpic | 38 | 21 | 6 | 11 | 54 | 36 | +18 | 48 | |
| 5 | Ceuta | 38 | 16 | 14 | 8 | 51 | 26 | +25 | 46 (Note: Ceuta finished ahead of Levante on head-to-head points: Ceuta–Levante 3–1, Levante–Ceuta 1–1) | |
| 6 | Levante | 38 | 19 | 8 | 11 | 57 | 45 | +12 | 46 | |
| 7 | Melilla | 38 | 14 | 12 | 12 | 39 | 31 | +8 | 40 (Note: Melilla finished ahead of Gandía and Marbella on head-to-head points: Melilla 5 pts, Gandía 5 pts, Marbella 2 pts. Melilla finished ahead of Gandía on head-to-head goal difference: Gandía–Melilla 1–0, Melilla–Gandía 2–0) | |
| 8 | Gandía | 38 | 14 | 12 | 12 | 58 | 43 | +15 | 40 | |
| 9 | Marbella | 38 | 16 | 8 | 14 | 34 | 30 | +4 | 40 | |
| 10 | Alcoyano | 38 | 14 | 9 | 15 | 48 | 46 | +2 | 37 (Note: Alcoyano finished ahead of Linense on head-to-head points: Linense–Alcoyano 2–2, Alcoyano–Linense 1–0) | |
| 11 | Linense | 38 | 12 | 13 | 13 | 39 | 42 | −3 | 37 | |
| 12 | Teruel | 38 | 12 | 11 | 15 | 46 | 45 | +1 | 35 | |
| 13 | Eldense | 38 | 11 | 11 | 16 | 44 | 54 | −10 | 33 | |
| 14 | Polideportivo Almería | 38 | 10 | 12 | 16 | 37 | 53 | −16 | 32 (Note: Polideportivo Almería finished ahead of Lorca on head-to-head points: Lorca–Polideportivo Almería 0–1, Polideportivo Almería–Lorca 1–0) | |
| 15 | Lorca | 38 | 8 | 16 | 14 | 29 | 39 | −10 | 32 | |
| 16 | Mestalla | 38 | 9 | 13 | 16 | 37 | 53 | −16 | 31 (Note: Valencia Mestalla finished ahead of Ronda and Benidorm on head-to-head points: Valencia Mestalla 6 pts, Ronda 4 pts, Benidorm 2 pts) | Relegation to Tercera División |
| 17 | Ronda | 38 | 11 | 9 | 18 | 37 | 56 | −19 | 31 | Relegation to Tercera División |
| 18 | Benidorm | 38 | 7 | 17 | 14 | 27 | 42 | −15 | 31 | Relegation to Tercera División |
| 19 | Conquense | 38 | 10 | 9 | 19 | 38 | 76 | −38 | 29 | Relegation to Tercera División |
| 20 | Cieza | 38 | 6 | 12 | 20 | 31 | 64 | −33 | 24 | Relegation to Tercera División |

Source: BDFútbol
Rules for classification: 1) points; 2) head-to-head points; 3) head-to-head goal difference; 4) goal difference; 5) number of goals scored

=== Results ===
| Home \ Away | ALB | ALC | ALM | ALZ | BEN | CEU | CIE | CON | ELD | GAN | LEV | LNS | LOR | MAB | MEL | MES | OLI | RON | TER | VIL |
|---|---|---|---|---|---|---|---|---|---|---|---|---|---|---|---|---|---|---|---|---|
| Albacete | — | 4–0 | 4–1 | 3–0 | 4–0 | 2–1 | 1–1 | 4–2 | 2–0 | 3–0 | 5–1 | 2–2 | 1–0 | 2–0 | 3–1 | 1–1 | 4–3 | 1–0 | 2–1 | 1–2 |
| Alcoyano | 0–1 | — | 3–0 | 0–1 | 2–1 | 1–2 | 5–0 | 0–1 | 2–1 | 5–2 | 2–1 | 1–0 | 2–1 | 0–2 | 2–1 | 2–1 | 1–1 | 3–0 | 1–0 | 0–1 |
| Poli Almería | 0–2 | 0–0 | — | 0–1 | 0–0 | 2–2 | 2–1 | 2–0 | 0–2 | 1–0 | 1–2 | 0–0 | 1–0 | 1–1 | 5–1 | 0–0 | 1–2 | 2–0 | 1–1 | 1–1 |
| Alzira | 0–0 | 1–0 | 1–0 | — | 1–0 | 1–0 | 4–1 | 0–1 | 3–3 | 2–2 | 2–1 | 1–0 | 2–0 | 4–0 | 2–1 | 2–1 | 0–1 | 1–1 | 2–1 | 0–0 |
| Benidorm | 0–0 | 0–0 | 1–1 | 1–1 | — | 1–1 | 1–1 | 0–0 | 2–0 | 1–0 | 0–1 | 0–1 | 1–1 | 0–0 | 2–1 | 0–0 | 1–3 | 1–1 | 3–1 | 1–1 |
| Ceuta | 2–1 | 3–2 | 3–0 | 1–1 | 2–0 | — | 4–0 | 3–0 | 3–0 | 1–1 | 3–1 | 2–1 | 3–0 | 1–1 | 1–0 | 0–1 | 1–1 | 4–0 | 0–0 | 0–0 |
| Cieza | 0–2 | 3–3 | 0–3 | 0–2 | 1–1 | 1–1 | — | 1–1 | 1–0 | 1–1 | 1–3 | 1–1 | 0–0 | 1–0 | 1–0 | 2–0 | 1–2 | 4–2 | 2–2 | 1–3 |
| Conquense | 2–1 | 0–3 | 3–1 | 0–5 | 1–1 | 1–1 | 0–2 | — | 5–1 | 1–6 | 2–0 | 2–1 | 4–0 | 2–1 | 0–0 | 1–3 | 1–2 | 1–1 | 1–2 | 0–6 |
| Eldense | 2–1 | 1–1 | 4–1 | 1–1 | 0–1 | 1–0 | 1–1 | 1–0 | — | 1–1 | 3–1 | 1–1 | 0–1 | 2–1 | 0–0 | 0–0 | 0–1 | 2–1 | 1–1 | 6–0 |
| Gandía | 1–0 | 1–1 | 2–3 | 1–2 | 1–2 | 0–0 | 2–0 | 3–1 | 5–1 | — | 1–2 | 4–1 | 0–0 | 1–0 | 1–0 | 4–1 | 0–1 | 3–1 | 1–0 | 3–0 |
| Levante | 3–2 | 2–0 | 1–1 | 0–0 | 0–0 | 1–1 | 1–0 | 3–0 | 2–5 | 2–1 | — | 2–0 | 3–1 | 1–2 | 1–0 | 0–0 | 3–1 | 3–1 | 3–0 | 2–0 |
| Linense | 3–2 | 2–2 | 2–0 | 1–0 | 2–1 | 0–2 | 2–0 | 2–1 | 1–0 | 0–0 | 1–2 | — | 1–1 | 0–1 | 1–1 | 1–1 | 2–1 | 1–0 | 2–0 | 0–0 |
| Lorca | 0–0 | 3–1 | 0–1 | 1–1 | 1–2 | 1–0 | 0–0 | 6–0 | 1–1 | 0–0 | 0–0 | 0–1 | — | 1–2 | 0–0 | 2–2 | 1–0 | 1–1 | 2–0 | 1–1 |
| Marbella | 2–0 | 1–2 | 1–0 | 0–0 | 3–0 | 1–0 | 1–0 | 0–0 | 0–0 | 1–1 | 1–0 | 1–0 | 0–1 | — | 0–0 | 3–0 | 0–1 | 0–1 | 1–0 | 3–0 |
| Melilla | 2–0 | 2–0 | 4–1 | 0–0 | 1–1 | 1–0 | 2–0 | 2–0 | 3–0 | 2–0 | 1–0 | 3–1 | 2–0 | 1–0 | — | 0–0 | 0–0 | 2–2 | 0–1 | 2–1 |
| Mestalla | 0–2 | 2–0 | 0–1 | 1–4 | 2–0 | 1–2 | 2–1 | 2–2 | 2–1 | 1–3 | 1–2 | 2–2 | 0–0 | 0–1 | 1–1 | — | 0–3 | 1–1 | 2–1 | 3–2 |
| Olímpic Xàtiva | 0–1 | 2–0 | 3–1 | 3–0 | 2–0 | 0–0 | 3–0 | 0–1 | 2–0 | 3–1 | 2–1 | 1–1 | 0–1 | 1–2 | 1–0 | 1–0 | — | 4–2 | 1–0 | 1–2 |
| Ronda | 1–0 | 1–0 | 1–1 | 1–2 | 1–0 | 1–0 | 2–1 | 3–0 | 1–2 | 1–1 | 2–2 | 1–0 | 2–0 | 2–1 | 0–2 | 0–1 | 2–0 | — | 0–3 | 0–1 |
| Teruel | 0–2 | 1–1 | 3–0 | 1–2 | 2–0 | 0–0 | 2–0 | 6–0 | 1–0 | 0–3 | 2–2 | 1–1 | 1–1 | 1–0 | 3–0 | 2–1 | 1–1 | 2–0 | — | 2–2 |
| Villarreal | 2–1 | 0–0 | 1–1 | 2–0 | 2–1 | 0–1 | 2–0 | 1–1 | 4–0 | 1–1 | 0–2 | 2–1 | 3–0 | 3–0 | 0–0 | 3–1 | 4–0 | 3–0 | 4–1 | — |

Source: BDFútbol
Legend: Blue = home team win; Yellow = draw; Red = away team win.

=== Top goalscorers ===
| Goalscorers | Goals | Team |
|---|---|---|
| (Spain) Bernardo Cid | 18 | Conquense |
| (Spain) Adriano García | 17 | Villarreal |
| (Spain) Alberto Martín | 17 | Ceuta |
| (Spain) Vicente Latorre | 17 | Levante |
| (Spain) Carlos Pérez | 17 | Teruel |

=== Top goalkeepers ===
| Goalkeeper | Goals | Matches | Average | Team |
|---|---|---|---|---|
| (Spain) Ignacio Verdés | 30 | 38 | 0.79 | Alzira |
| (Spain) Joaquín Cháfer | 26 | 29 | 0.9 | Olímpic |
| (Spain) Pedro Muñoz | 36 | 38 | 0.95 | Albacete |
| (Spain) Silvestre González | 37 | 38 | 0.97 | Villarreal |
| (Spain) Juan Miguel San Román | 37 | 38 | 0.97 | Lorca |
