= Andorra CF =

- Full name: Andorra Club de Futbol
- Founded: 1957
- Ground: Estadio Juan Antonio Endeiza, Andorra, province of Teruel, Aragon, Spain
- Capacity: 3,000
- President: José Luis Burgos García
- Head coach: Yvo Serrano
- League: Tercera Federación – Group 17
- 2025–26: Tercera Federación – Group 17, 11th of 18
Home colours	Away colours

Andorra Club de Fútbol is a Spanish football team based in Andorra, province of Teruel, in the autonomous community of Aragon. Founded in 1957, it plays in Tercera Federación – Group 17, holding home games at Estadio Juan Antonio Endeiza, with a capacity of 3,000 seats.

Inaugurated in 1956 with the creation of the football club itself, the field is still the same as it was in the past, although remodeled and modernized, with the name of the former president of the club Juan Antonio Endeiza.

== History ==
=== Club names ===
- Club Deportivo Andorra – (1957–58)
- Club Deportivo Calvo Sotelo Andorra – (1958–73)
- Club Deportivo Endesa Andorra – (1973–2001)
- Andorra Club de Fútbol – (2001–)

== Season to season ==
Season	Tier	Division	Place	Copa del Rey
1957–58	4	1ª Reg.	1st	
1958–59	3	3ª	11th	
1959–60	3	3ª	10th	
1960–61	3	3ª	11th	
1961–62	3	3ª	4th	
1962–63	3	3ª	7th	
1963–64	3	3ª	1st	
1964–65	3	3ª	1st	
1965–66	3	3ª	2nd	
1966–67	3	3ª	3rd	
1967–68	3	3ª	5th	
1968–69	3	3ª	13th	
1969–70	3	3ª	8th	
1970–71	3	3ª	15th	
1971–72	3	3ª	16th	
1972–73	3	3ª	9th	
1973–74	3	3ª	18th	
1974–75	4	Reg. Pref.	1st	
1975–76	3	3ª	14th	
1976–77	4	Reg. Pref.	2nd	

Season	Tier	Division	Place	Copa del Rey
1977–78	4	3ª	3rd	
1978–79	4	3ª	4th	
1979–80	4	3ª	4th	First round
1980–81	4	3ª	2nd	Second round
1981–82	3	2ª B	9th	First round
1982–83	3	2ª B	15th	Second round
1983–84	3	2ª B	12th	
1984–85	3	2ª B	4th	Second round
1985–86	3	2ª B	13th	First round
1986–87	4	3ª	1st	
1987–88	3	2ª B	4th	First round
1988–89	3	2ª B	12th	First round
1989–90	3	2ª B	11th	
1990–91	3	2ª B	19th	Third round
1991–92	4	3ª	1st	Second round
1992–93	3	2ª B	15th	Third round
1993–94	3	2ª B	18th	Third round
1994–95	4	3ª	1st	First round
1995–96	3	2ª B	20th	Second round
1996–97	4	3ª	3rd	

Season	Tier	Division	Place	Copa del Rey
1997–98	3	2ª B	20th	First round
1998–99	4	3ª	1st	
1999–2000	4	3ª	3rd	
2000–01	4	3ª	5th	
2001–02	4	3ª	12th	
2002–03	4	3ª	12th	
2003–04	4	3ª	3rd	
2004–05	4	3ª	8th	
2005–06	4	3ª	3rd	
2006–07	4	3ª	3rd	
2007–08	4	3ª	5th	
2008–09	4	3ª	6th	
2009–10	4	3ª	6th	
2010–11	4	3ª	1st	
2011–12	3	2ªB	17th	Third round
2012–13	4	3ª	2nd	
2013–14	4	3ª	10th	
2014–15	4	3ª	5th	
2015–16	4	3ª	2nd	
2016–17	4	3ª	20th	First round

Season	Tier	Division	Place	Copa del Rey
2017–18	5	Reg. Pref.	9th	
2018–19	5	Reg. Pref.	6th	
2019–20	5	Reg. Pref.	18th	
2020–21	DNP			
2021–22	6	Reg. Pref.	6th	
2022–23	6	Reg. Pref.	4th	
2023–24	6	Reg. Pref.	1st	
2024–25	5	3ª Fed.	12th	
2025–26	5	3ª Fed.	11th	
2026–27	5	3ª Fed.		

- 14 seasons in Segunda División B
- 43 seasons in Tercera División
- 3 seasons in Tercera Federación

== Honours ==
- Tercera División

Winners (7): 1963–64, 1964–65, 1986–87, 1991–92, 1994–95, 1998–99, 2010–11
Runners-up (4): 1965–66, 1980–81, 2012–13, 2015–16

== Famous players ==
- (Romania) Andrei Rațiu
- (Spain) Alberto Belsué
- (Spain) Jesús Seba
- (Spain) Txiki
- (Serbia) Goran Drulić
