= Talavera CF =

Spanish football club

Talavera
- Full name: Talavera Club de Fútbol
- Founded: 1948
- Dissolved: 2010
- Ground: Estadio El Prado, Talavera, Castile–La Mancha, Spain
- Capacity: 6,000
- Chairman: (Spain) Martín Muñoz
- Manager: (Spain) Albert Ferri
- 2009–10: 3ª - Group 18, 4th
| Home colours | Away colours |

Talavera Club de Fútbol was a Spanish football team based in Talavera de la Reina, in the autonomous community of Castile-La Mancha. Founded in 1948, it played its last season in Tercera División - Group 18, holding home matches at Estadio El Prado, with a 6,000-seat capacity.

== History ==
Talavera CF was founded in 1948, spending its first 34 years of existence fluctuating between the regional leagues and the fourth division. In 1982, it reached level three for the first time ever, going on to last four years in the category.

In 1993, Talavera returned to division three, for a much longer spell (15 seasons, with two unsuccessful promotion playoff appearances), being relegated at the end of the 2007–08 campaign. In August 2010, shortly before the beginning of the new season, in a special meeting, the club was dissolved due to overwhelming financial problems, owing wages to both players and managers from several seasons, with the club having a debt of more than €2 million; its place was taken by Tomelloso CF.

== Season to season ==
| Season | Tier | Division | Place | Copa del Rey |
|---|---|---|---|---|
| 1958–59 | 6 | 3ª Reg. | 3rd | |
| 1959–60 | 5 | 2ª Reg. | 4th | |
| 1960–61 | 5 | 2ª Reg. | 3rd | |
| 1961–62 | 5 | 2ª Reg. | 1st | |
| 1962–63 | 4 | 1ª Reg. | 6th | |
| 1963–64 | 3 | 3ª | 4th | |
| 1964–65 | 3 | 3ª | 2nd | |
| 1965–66 | 3 | 3ª | 3rd | |
| 1966–67 | 3 | 3ª | 8th | |
| 1967–68 | 3 | 3ª | 2nd | |
| 1968–69 | 3 | 3ª | 12th | |
| 1969–70 | 3 | 3ª | 6th | |
| 1970–71 | 3 | 3ª | 6th | |
| 1971–72 | 3 | 3ª | 13th | |
| 1972–73 | 4 | 1ª Reg. | 3rd | |
| 1973–74 | 4 | Reg. Pref. | 2nd | |
| 1974–75 | 4 | Reg. Pref. | 1st | |
| 1975–76 | 3 | 3ª | 10th | |
| 1976–77 | 3 | 3ª | 16th | |
| 1977–78 | 4 | 3ª | 11th | |

| Season | Tier | Division | Place | Copa del Rey |
|---|---|---|---|---|
| 1978–79 | 4 | 3ª | 2nd | |
| 1979–80 | 4 | 3ª | 8th | |
| 1980–81 | 4 | 3ª | 14th | |
| 1981–82 | 4 | 3ª | 2nd | |
| 1982–83 | 3 | 2ª B | 6th | |
| 1983–84 | 3 | 2ª B | 14th | |
| 1984–85 | 3 | 2ª B | 13th | |
| 1985–86 | 3 | 2ª B | 12th | |
| 1986–87 | 4 | 3ª | 15th | |
| 1987–88 | 4 | 3ª | 10th | |
| 1988–89 | 4 | 3ª | 7th | |
| 1989–90 | 4 | 3ª | 3rd | |
| 1990–91 | 4 | 3ª | 1st | |
| 1991–92 | 4 | 3ª | 3rd | |
| 1992–93 | 4 | 3ª | 1st | |
| 1993–94 | 3 | 2ª B | 14th | |
| 1994–95 | 3 | 2ª B | 5th | |
| 1995–96 | 3 | 2ª B | 6th | |
| 1996–97 | 3 | 2ª B | 2nd | |
| 1997–98 | 3 | 2ª B | 4th | |

| Season | Tier | Division | Place | Copa del Rey |
|---|---|---|---|---|
| 1998–99 | 3 | 2ª B | 5th | |
| 1999–00 | 3 | 2ª B | 16th | |
| 2000–01 | 3 | 2ª B | 14th | |
| 2001–02 | 3 | 2ª B | 15th | |
| 2002–03 | 3 | 2ª B | 10th | |
| 2003–04 | 3 | 2ª B | 11th | |

| Season | Tier | Division | Place | Copa del Rey |
|---|---|---|---|---|
| 2004–05 | 3 | 2ª B | 16th | |
| 2005–06 | 3 | 2ª B | 14th | |
| 2006–07 | 3 | 2ª B | 5th | |
| 2007–08 | 3 | 2ª B | 19th | |
| 2008–09 | 4 | 3ª | 13th | |
| 2009–10 | 4 | 3ª | 4th | |

- 19 seasons in Segunda División B
- 25 seasons in Tercera División

== Famous players ==
- (Argentina) Uriel Bartolucci
- (Cameroon) Fabrice Moreau
- (Spain) Antonio Anero
- (Spain) Mariano García Remón
