= CF Lorca Deportiva (1969) =

Spanish football club

Lorca Deportiva
- Full name: Club de Fútbol Lorca Deportiva
- Founded: 1969
- Dissolved: 1994
- Ground: San José; Lorca, Murcia, Spain
- Capacity: 8,000
- League: 3ª - Group 13
- 1993–94: 3ª - Group 13, 17th
Home colours	Away colours

Club de Fútbol Lorca Deportiva was a Spanish football club based in Lorca, in the Region of Murcia. Founded in 1969 and dissolved in 1994 due to serious economic debts, it held home games at Estadio Municipal de San San José, with an 8,000-seat capacity.

CF Lorca played in Segunda División in 1984–85, finishing 20th and last in its only season in the category.

Following the side's disappearance another club was founded in the city, Lorca Club de Fútbol, through a merger between UD Lorca and Lorca Promesas. It also folded, in 2002.

== Season to season ==
Season	Tier	Division	Place	Copa del Rey
1969–70	5	2ª Reg.	1st	
1970–71	4	1ª Reg.	6th	
1971–72	4	Reg. Pref.	2nd	
1972–73	4	Reg. Pref.	7th	
1973–74	4	Reg. Pref.	3rd	
1974–75	4	Reg. Pref.	19th	
1975–76	5	1ª Reg.	2nd	
1976–77	4	Reg. Pref.	11th	
1977–78	5	Reg. Pref.	7th	
1978–79	5	Reg. Pref.	2nd	
1979–80	4	3ª	17th	
1980–81	4	3ª	1st	
1981–82	3	2ª B	3rd	

Season	Tier	Division	Place	Copa del Rey
1982–83	3	2ª B	11th	
1983–84	3	2ª B	1st	
1984–85	2	2ª	20th	
1985–86	3	2ª B	20th	
1986–87	4	3ª	3rd	
1987–88	3	2ª B	15th	
1988–89	3	2ª B	19th	
1989–90	4	3ª	11th	
1990–91	4	3ª	11th	
1991–92	4	3ª	6th	
1992–93	4	3ª	12th	
1993–94	4	3ª	17th	

- 1 season in Segunda División
- 6 seasons in Segunda División B
- 8 seasons in Tercera División
