= AD Parla =

Association football club in Spain

Parla
- Full name: Agrupación Deportiva Parla
- Founded: 1973
- Ground: Los Prados, Parla, Madrid, Spain
- Capacity: 2,500
- President: Nuria López Blázquez
- Head coach: José Luis Navarro Fernández
- League: Primera Autonómica de Aficionados – Group 2
- 2025–26: Tercera Federación – Group 7, 17th of 18 (relegated)
Home colours	Away colours

Agrupación Deportiva Parla is a Spanish football team based in Parla, in the autonomous community of Madrid. Founded in 1973 it plays in Primera Autonómica de Aficionados – Group 2, holding home games at Campo Municipal Los Prados, with a capacity of 2,500 seats.

== History ==
The club was founded by José Paz Serrano in 1973. During its first 8 years AD Parla won several Regional competitions and reached the Tercera División.

== Season to season ==
Season	Tier	Division	Place	Copa del Rey
1973–74	8	3ª Reg.	5th	
1974–75	8	3ª Reg.	1st	
1975–76	7	3ª Reg. P.	2nd	
1976–77	6	2ª Reg.	1st	
1977–78	6	1ª Reg.	1st	
1978–79	5	Reg. Pref.	5th	
1979–80	5	Reg. Pref.	5th	
1980–81	4	3ª	4th	
1981–82	4	3ª	1st	First round
1982–83	3	2ª B	10th	First round
1983–84	3	2ª B	10th	Second round
1984–85	3	2ª B	15th	Second round
1985–86	3	2ª B	11th	
1986–87	4	3ª	1st	
1987–88	3	2ª B	18th	First round
1988–89	4	3ª	3rd	Second round
1989–90	4	3ª	17th	
1990–91	4	3ª	4th	
1991–92	4	3ª	11th	First round
1992–93	4	3ª	13th	

Season	Tier	Division	Place	Copa del Rey
1993–94	4	3ª	6th	
1994–95	4	3ª	9th	
1995–96	4	3ª	7th	
1996–97	4	3ª	12th	
1997–98	4	3ª	8th	
1998–99	4	3ª	18th	
1999–2000	5	Reg. Pref.	1st	
2000–01	4	3ª	7th	
2001–02	4	3ª	17th	
2002–03	5	Reg. Pref.	2nd	
2003–04	4	3ª	10th	
2004–05	4	3ª	3rd	
2005–06	4	3ª	2nd	
2006–07	4	3ª	5th	First round
2007–08	4	3ª	6th	
2008–09	4	3ª	2nd	
2009–10	4	3ª	2nd	
2010–11	4	3ª	14th	First round
2011–12	4	3ª	4th	
2012–13	4	3ª	7th	

Season	Tier	Division	Place	Copa del Rey
2013–14	4	3ª	10th	
2014–15	4	3ª	11th	
2015–16	4	3ª	14th	
2016–17	4	3ª	20th	
2017–18	5	Pref.	2nd	
2018–19	4	3ª	15th	
2019–20	4	3ª	19th	
2020–21	4	3ª	4th	
2021–22	5	3ª RFEF	14th	
2022–23	6	Pref.	2nd	
2023–24	5	3ª Fed.	18th	
2024–25	5	3ª Fed.	14th	
2025–26	5	3ª Fed.	17th	
2026–27	6	1ª Aut.		

- 5 seasons in Segunda División B
- 33 seasons in Tercera División
- 4 seasons in Tercera Federación/Tercera División RFEF
