= CD Puertollano =

Spanish football team

Puertollano
- Full name: Club Deportivo Puertollano
- Nicknames: Mineros; Puerto; Calvo; Industrial
- Founded: 24 September 1948 (as Club de Fútbol Calvo Sotelo)
- Dissolved: 15 May 2015
- Stadium: Ciudad de Puertollano
- Capacity: 8,000
- President: Guillermo Fernández
- Head coach: Pablo Franco
- 2014–15: 3ª – Group 18, 10th of 20
Home colours	Away colours

Club Deportivo Puertollano was a Spanish football team based in Puertollano, in the autonomous community of Castile-La Mancha. Founded in 1948 it played in Tercera División – Group 18, holding home matches at Estadio Ciudad de Puertollano, with a capacity of 8,000 seats.

== History ==
Club Deportivo Puertollano was founded in 1948 as Club de Fútbol Calvo Sotelo. In 1999 the name of the club was changed to Unión Deportiva Puertollano and, in 2010, it was changed again, this time to Club Deportivo Puertollano.

On 1 July 2012 Puertollano was relegated to Tercera División by the Royal Spanish Football Federation, due to non-payment of wages to its players.

On 9 July 2014, Puertollano resigned to promote to Segunda División B due to the impossibility of getting an aval of €400,000.

On 15 May 2015, the members of the club voted in assembly its dissolution.

=== Club naming ===
- CD Calvo Sotelo — (1948–53)
- CF Calvo Sotelo — (1953–88)
- Puertollano Industrial CF – (1988–1999)
- UD Puertollano – (1999–2010)
- CD Puertollano – (2010–2015)

== Season to season ==
- As Club Deportivo Calvo Sotelo and Club de Fútbol Calvo Sotelo

Season	Tier	Division	Place	Copa del Rey
1948–49	4	1ª Reg.	1st	
1949–50	4	1ª Reg.	2nd	
1950–51	3	3ª	3rd	
1951–52	3	3ª	5th	
1952–53	3	3ª	2nd	
1953–54	3	3ª	5th	
1954–55	3	3ª	4th	
1955–56	3	3ª	4th	
1956–57	3	3ª	2nd	
1957–58	3	3ª	6th	
1958–59	3	3ª	1st	

Season	Tier	Division	Place	Copa del Rey
1959–60	3	3ª	2nd	
1960–61	3	3ª	1st	
1961–62	3	3ª	1st	
1962–63	3	3ª	1st	
1963–64	3	3ª	1st	
1964–65	2	2ª	6th	
1965–66	2	2ª	7th	
1966–67	2	2ª	8th	
1967–68	2	2ª	2nd	
1968–69	2	2ª	6th	

Season	Tier	Division	Place	Copa del Rey
1969–70	2	2ª	12th	
1970–71	2	2ª	19th	
1971–72	3	3ª	8th	
1972–73	3	3ª	11th	
1973–74	3	3ª	6th	
1974–75	3	3ª	1st	
1975–76	2	2ª	11th	
1976–77	2	2ª	16th	
1977–78	2	2ª	20th	
1978–79	3	2ª B	5th	

Season	Tier	Division	Place	Copa del Rey
1979–80	3	2ª B	4th	
1980–81	3	2ª B	13th	
1981–82	3	2ª B	7th	
1982–83	3	2ª B	13th	
1983–84	3	2ª B	2nd	
1984–85	2	2ª	19th	
1985–86	3	2ª B	8th	
1986–87	4	3ª	12th	
1987–88	4	3ª	9th	

- As Puertollano Industrial Club de Fútbol

Season	Tier	Division	Place	Copa del Rey
1988–89	4	3ª	17th	
1989–90	4	3ª	20th	
1990–91	5	Reg. Pref.	1st	
1991–92	4	3ª	11th	
1992–93	4	3ª	6th	
1993–94	4	3ª	4th	

Season	Tier	Division	Place	Copa del Rey
1994–95	4	3ª	3rd	
1995–96	4	3ª	3rd	
1996–97	4	3ª	7th	
1997–98	4	3ª	3rd	
1998–99	4	3ª	5th	

- As Unión Deportiva Puertollano

Season	Tier	Division	Place	Copa del Rey
1999–2000	4	3ª	1st	
2000–01	4	3ª	9th	Preliminary round
2001–02	4	3ª	12th	
2002–03	4	3ª	10th	
2003–04	4	3ª	2nd	
2004–05	4	3ª	5th	

Season	Tier	Division	Place	Copa del Rey
2005–06	4	3ª	1st	
2006–07	3	2ª B	7th	Third round
2007–08	3	2ª B	13th	Third round
2008–09	3	2ª B	5th	
2009–10	3	2ª B	6th	Round of 32

- As Club Deportivo Puertollano

Season	Tier	Division	Place	Copa del Rey
2010–11	3	2ª B	12th	First round
2011–12	3	2ª B	11th	
2012–13	4	3ª	8th	
2013–14	4	3ª	1st	
2014–15	4	3ª	10th	First round

- 11 seasons in Segunda División
- 13 seasons in Segunda División B
- 40 seasons in Tercera División
- 3 seasons in Categorías Regionales

== Honours ==
- Tercera División: (9) 1958–59, 1960–61, 1961–62, 1962–63, 1963–64, 1974–75, 1999–2000, 2005–06, 2013–14
- Copa Federación (3) – record: 1993–94, 2005–06, 2010–11

== Current squad ==
Note: Flags indicate national team as defined under FIFA eligibility rules; some limited exceptions apply. Players may hold more than one non-FIFA nationality.

No.	Pos.	Nation	Player
1	GK	ESP	Limones
2	DF	ESP	Portela
3	DF	ESP	Pelegrina
4	DF	ESP	Raúl Aguilar
5	DF	ESP	Juanlu
8	MF	ESP	Checa
11	MF	ESP	Pedro Díaz

No.	Pos.	Nation	Player
14	FW	BRA	Elton
15	FW	ESP	Pizarraya
16	FW	ESP	Guerra
17	GK	ESP	Reguero
18	MF	ESP	Valdivia
20	MF	ESP	Juanfri
21	DF	ESP	Manu Maya
24	GK	ESP	Sebas

== Club crests ==
CF Calvo Sotelo crest (1953–1962)

UD Puertollano crest (1999–2010)

CD Puertollano crest (2010–2013)
