= FC Barcelona C =

FC Barcelona's defunct reserve football team

Barcelona C
- Full name: Futbol Club Barcelona
- Nickname: Barça C
- Founded: 1967
- Dissolved: 1 July 2007
- Ground: Mini Estadi
- Capacity: 15,276
- League: 3ª – Group 5
- 2006–07: 3ª – Group 5, 13th
Home colours	Away colours	Third colours

Fútbol Club Barcelona C was a Spanish football team that folded on 2 July 2007. The youth team of FC Barcelona, it played its home games at the Mini Estadi.

Founded in 1967 as Barcelona Amateur, it adopted the name FC Barcelona C in 1993. Unlike the English League, youth teams in Spain play in the same football pyramid as their senior team rather than a separate league. However youth and reserve teams cannot play in the same division as their senior teams. FC Barcelona C played its matches at the Mini Estadi, a stadium located within the club's facilities on Diagonal, attached to Camp Nou, with a capacity for 15,276 spectators.

FC Barcelona C last played in the fourth division. They were ineligible for promotion to the third level, as FC Barcelona B were playing in that category. Club president Joan Laporta chose not to inscribe the team in Primera Catalana for 2007–08, after the B team dropped to the fourth level.

== Honours ==
- Generalitat Cup

Winners (1): 1984

- Fourth Division

Winners (3): 1983–84, 1986–87, 1997–98

- Fifth division

Winners (1): 1973–74

- Campeonato de España de Aficionados

Winners (6): 1949, 1952, 1961, 1971, 1980, 1982

== Season to season ==
Season	Tier	Division	Place	Copa del Rey
1969–70	6	2ª Reg.	1st	
1970–71	5	1ª Reg.	3rd	
1971–72	5	1ª Reg.	9th	
1972–73	5	1ª Reg.	2nd	
1973–74	5	1ª Reg.	1st	
1974–75	4	Reg. Pref.	3rd	
1975–76	4	Reg. Pref.	5th	
1976–77	4	Reg. Pref.	14th	
1977–78	4	3ª	5th	
1978–79	4	3ª	6th	
1979–80	4	3ª	5th	
1980–81	4	3ª	5th	
1981–82	4	3ª	4th	Third round
1982–83	4	3ª	9th	First round
1983–84	4	3ª	1st	
1984–85	3	2ª B	16th	First round
1985–86	3	2ª B	19th	
1986–87	4	3ª	1st	
1987–88	3	2ª B	9th	Second round

Season	Tier	Division	Place	Copa del Rey
1988–89	3	2ª B	11th	First round
1989–90	4	3ª	2nd	
1990–91	4	3ª	8th	DNP
1991–92	4	3ª	5th	DNP
1992–93	4	3ª	11th	DNP
1993–94	4	3ª	3rd	DNP
1994–95	4	3ª	3rd	DNP
1995–96	3	2ª B	19th	DNP
1996–97	4	3ª	2nd	DNP
1997–98	4	3ª	1st	DNP
1998–99	4	3ª	9th	DNP
1999–2000	4	3ª	9th	DNP
2000–01	4	3ª	5th	DNP
2001–02	4	3ª	7th	DNP
2002–03	4	3ª	5th	DNP
2003–04	4	3ª	9th	DNP
2004–05	4	3ª	15th	DNP
2005–06	4	3ª	14th	DNP
2006–07	4	3ª	13th	DNP

- 5 seasons in Segunda División B
- 25 seasons in Tercera División
