= 1984–85 Segunda División =

54th season of the second-tier football league in Spain

Segunda División
- Season: 1984–85
- Champions: UD Las Palmas
- Promoted: UD Las Palmas; Cádiz CF; Celta de Vigo
- Relegated: UD Salamanca; Granada CF; CD Calvo Sotelo; CF Lorca Deportiva
- Matches: 380
- Goals: 888 (2.34 per match)
- Top goalscorer: (Spain) Mejías

The 1984–85 Segunda División season saw 20 teams participate in the second flight Spanish league. UD Las Palmas won the league.

UD Las Palmas, Cádiz CF and Celta de Vigo were promoted to Primera División. UD Salamanca, Granada CF, CD Calvo Sotelo and CF Lorca Deportiva were relegated to Segunda División B.

== Teams ==
Location of teams in Segunda División 1984-85
Canary Islands

Team	Home city	Stadium
Atlético Madrileño	Madrid	Vicente Calderón
Barcelona Atlètic	Barcelona	Mini Estadi
Bilbao Athletic	Bilbao	San Mamés
Cádiz CF	Cádiz	Ramón de Carranza
Calvo Sotelo CF	Puertollano	Empretrol
Cartagena FC	Cartagena	El Almarjal
CD Castellón	Castellón de la Plana	Castalia
Castilla CF	Madrid	Ciudad Deportiva
RC Celta de Vigo	Vigo	Balaídos
Deportivo La Coruña	A Coruña	Riazor
Granada CF	Granada	Los Cármenes
UD Las Palmas	Las Palmas	Insular
CD Logroñés	Logroño	Las Gaunas
Lorca Deportiva	Lorca	San José
RCD Mallorca	Mallorca	Lluís Sitjar
Real Oviedo	Oviedo	Carlos Tartiere
Recreativo de Huelva	Huelva	Municipal
UD Salamanca	Villares de la Reina	Helmántico
CE Sabadell	Sabadell	Nova Creu Alta
CD Tenerife	Santa Cruz de Tenerife	Heliodoro Rodríguez López

== Final table ==
Pos	Team	Pld	W	D	L	GF	GA	GD	Pts	Promotion or relegation
1	UD Las Palmas	38	22	11	5	56	37	+19	55	Promoted to Primera División
2	Cádiz CF	38	18	13	7	59	28	+31	49	Promoted to Primera División
3	Celta de Vigo	38	20	8	10	63	40	+23	48	Promoted to Primera División
4	CE Sabadell FC	38	15	12	11	49	43	+6	42	
5	Castilla CF	38	14	12	12	49	48	+1	40	
6	CD Logroñés	38	18	4	16	51	46	+5	40	
7	RCD Mallorca	38	15	10	13	46	39	+7	40	
8	Cartagena FC	38	12	13	13	41	37	+4	37	
9	Barcelona Atlètic	38	13	11	14	36	42	−6	37	
10	Recreativo de Huelva	38	11	14	13	34	42	−8	36	
11	CD Tenerife	38	12	12	14	48	43	+5	36	
12	CD Castellón	38	14	8	16	51	51	0	36	
13	Deportivo de La Coruña	38	13	10	15	52	60	−8	36	
14	Atlético Madrileño	38	12	11	15	37	45	−8	35	
15	Bilbao Athletic	38	12	10	16	44	52	−8	34	
16	Real Oviedo	38	9	16	13	44	45	−1	34	
17	UD Salamanca	38	12	9	17	39	37	+2	33	Relegated to Segunda División B
18	Granada CF	38	12	9	17	32	46	−14	33	Relegated to Segunda División B
19	CD Calvo Sotelo	38	10	10	18	34	48	−14	30	Relegated to Segunda División B
20	CF Lorca Deportiva	38	10	9	19	23	59	−36	29	Relegated to Segunda División B

Source: BDFutbol

== Results ==
Home \ Away	ATM	BAR	BIL	CÁD	CAL	CAR	CAS	CST	CEL	DEP	GRA	LPA	LOG	LOR	MLL	OVI	REC	SAB	SAL	TEN
At. Madrileño	—	1–0	3–2	1–1	2–0	0–0	3–1	3–1	0–2	1–0	2–0	2–0	1–3	2–1	1–0	1–1	4–0	1–1	0–0	2–2
Barcelona At.	2–1	—	1–1	0–4	1–0	2–3	4–0	2–1	2–5	2–1	0–0	2–2	1–1	1–0	0–0	1–1	1–1	1–0	1–0	1–0
Bilbao Ath.	1–1	1–0	—	0–1	2–0	1–3	0–1	0–1	1–0	2–2	2–0	1–1	3–1	1–0	0–2	1–1	2–0	2–2	3–1	2–0
Cádiz	0–0	1–0	2–0	—	2–0	2–2	1–1	0–1	2–0	7–2	2–0	4–1	3–0	5–0	2–0	1–1	0–0	3–0	2–1	1–0
Calvo Sotelo	0–0	0–0	2–2	0–1	—	2–1	2–1	1–0	1–1	0–0	0–3	0–0	1–0	1–0	2–2	3–1	3–0	0–1	2–1	1–1
Cartagena	2–0	1–1	1–0	1–0	0–0	—	2–0	1–1	0–1	2–0	2–0	0–1	1–2	3–0	2–1	3–2	1–0	1–3	0–0	0–0
Castellón	0–0	0–1	4–0	1–1	2–2	2–1	—	0–0	4–0	1–0	1–0	0–0	2–3	1–0	3–3	5–1	5–0	4–0	2–1	2–1
Castilla	2–0	0–4	1–0	0–0	1–0	1–1	2–1	—	3–1	4–2	3–0	0–0	2–0	2–0	0–2	0–2	1–0	1–1	3–2	2–4
Celta	2–0	3–1	2–0	2–0	4–0	1–0	2–0	2–2	—	5–0	4–1	1–2	1–0	2–1	1–0	0–0	0–0	3–1	3–1	2–0
Deportivo	1–0	3–1	2–0	2–2	0–2	4–2	2–0	4–3	3–2	—	0–1	1–3	0–2	3–0	3–1	1–0	0–0	3–0	3–0	2–2
Granada	1–0	2–0	0–0	1–1	3–1	0–0	3–0	1–4	1–4	0–0	—	0–1	1–0	2–0	1–1	2–1	2–2	2–0	1–0	2–1
Las Palmas	2–1	3–0	2–2	0–0	2–1	2–1	3–0	1–0	2–1	2–2	2–1	—	1–0	2–1	1–0	4–2	0–0	3–1	2–1	2–1
Logroñés	2–1	3–1	2–1	2–0	3–2	1–1	3–0	0–2	1–2	1–2	3–1	2–0	—	0–0	2–0	2–0	4–1	3–2	1–0	1–3
Lorca Dep.	1–0	1–0	1–2	1–0	1–0	1–0	0–3	2–2	1–1	1–1	1–0	1–2	0–0	—	0–0	2–0	0–0	0–0	1–0	2–1
Mallorca	2–0	0–1	3–2	1–0	1–0	2–2	2–1	2–2	2–0	1–0	5–0	2–0	0–1	1–3	—	2–0	1–0	3–0	1–1	1–0
Oviedo	1–1	1–0	2–3	1–1	4–0	1–1	1–0	0–0	1–1	1–1	1–0	0–1	2–1	8–0	0–0	—	1–0	0–1	1–0	1–1
Recreativo	1–2	0–1	2–1	1–1	2–1	1–0	1–0	2–0	2–1	3–0	0–0	2–2	2–0	2–0	2–2	2–2	—	2–0	0–0	1–0
Sabadell	4–0	0–0	1–1	2–1	1–0	1–0	3–3	1–1	4–0	2–1	0–0	3–1	1–0	5–0	2–0	0–0	2–1	—	0–1	3–0
Salamanca	3–0	0–0	0–1	1–2	2–0	1–0	0–0	2–0	1–1	1–1	1–0	0–2	3–1	6–0	2–0	2–1	1–0	0–0	—	3–1
Tenerife	3–0	1–0	4–1	2–3	0–4	0–0	4–0	3–0	0–0	3–0	1–0	1–1	2–0	0–0	2–0	1–1	1–1	1–1	1–0	—

Source: BDFutbol
Legend: Blue = home team win; Yellow = draw; Red = away team win.
