= Ciudad Deportiva del Real Zaragoza =

Training ground and academy or Real Zaragoza

- Interactive map of Ciudad Deportiva del Real Zaragoza
- Location: Cuarte de Huerva; Aragon, Spain
- Coordinates: 41°35′41″N 00°56′57″W
- Owner: Real Zaragoza
- Type: Football training ground

Construction
- Opened: 9 October 1974

Tenant
- Real Zaragoza (training) (1974-)

Website
- Ciudad Deportiva del Real Zaragoza

The Ciudad Deportiva del Real Zaragoza is the training ground and academy base of the Spanish football club Real Zaragoza. It was opened in 1974 by the efforts of then-club president Jose Angel Zalba. It was designed by architect Julio Descartín.

Located in Cuarte de Huerva 8 km south of Zaragoza and covering an area of 150,000 m^{2}, it is used for youth and senior teams trainings.

Currently, the coordinator of the Ciudad Deportiva is Pedro Suñén.

== Facilities ==
- Ciudad Deportiva Stadium with a capacity of 2,500 seats, is the home stadium of Deportivo Aragón, the reserve team of Real Zaragoza.
- 2 grass pitches.
- 1 artificial pitch.
- 2 mini grass pitches.
- 3 outdoor swimming pools.
- 4 outdoor tennis courts.
- 2 indoor sport halls.
- 1 outdoor basketball court.
- Service centre with gymnasium and a small grass pitch.
