= Estadio El Segalar =

Sports stadium in Spain

The Estadio El Segalar is a sports stadium located in Binefar, Spain. The stadium is currently used by Spanish football team CD Binefar, and has a capacity of 5,000. The stadium's pitch size is 102x65 metres. Estadio El Segalar was built in 1950.

The stadium has held Copa del Rey matches in the past, including CD Binefar's match against Endesa Andorra in 1985.
