= Andorra, Teruel =

Andorra
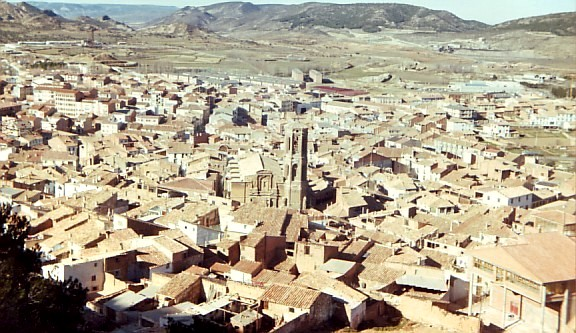

- Coat of arms

- Location within Spain
- Coordinates: 40°58′39″N 0°26′54″W
- Country: Spain
- Autonomous community: Aragon
- Province: Teruel
- Municipality: Andorra

Government
  - Mayor: Antonio Amador Cueto (PSOE) (2019-)

Area
  - Total: 141.36 km^{2} (54.58 sq mi)
- Elevation: 714 m (2,343 ft)

Population (2025-01-01)
  - Total: 7,223
  - Density: 51.10/km^{2} (132.3/sq mi)
- Demonym: Andorrano
- Time zone: UTC+1 (CET)
  - Summer (DST): UTC+2 (CEST)
- Postal code: 44500

Andorra is a town and municipality of Teruel province in the autonomous community of Aragon, Spain. It should not be confused with the Principality of Andorra or its capital, Andorra la Vella, 236 km (147 miles) away.

In 2019 the municipality, which covers an area of 141.36 km^{2}, had 7,472 inhabitants, making it the third largest municipality in the province of Teruel.

Andorra is the capital of the Aragonese comarca of Andorra-Sierra de Arcos and is located in a region where there is much mining activity.

The town's patron saint is St Macarius.

== History ==
During the Spanish Civil War, the town participated in the Spanish revolution and was collectivised by the CNT and UGT.

== Administration ==
The mayor of Andorra is Mr Rafael Guia Marques, of the Socialist party.

== See also ==
- List of municipalities in Teruel
