= 1986–87 Tercera División =

Tercera División
- Season: 1986–87

The 1986–87 Tercera División season is the 10th season since establishment the tier four.

== League table ==
=== Group 1 ===
Pos	Team	Pld	W	D	L	GF	GA	GD	Pts	Promotion or relegation
1	Endesa As Pontes	38	20	14	4	52	21	+31	54	Promotion to the Segunda División B
2	Arenteiro	38	21	9	8	57	33	+24	51	Promotion to the Segunda División B
3	Lalín	38	19	9	10	56	37	+19	47	Promotion to the Segunda División B
4	Bergantiños	38	17	12	9	43	24	+19	46	Promotion to the Segunda División B
5	Arosa	38	18	10	10	49	37	+12	46	Promotion to the Segunda División B
6	Compostela	38	16	13	9	43	33	+10	45	
7	Céltiga	38	14	12	12	43	38	+5	40	
8	Gran Peña	38	14	11	13	49	43	+6	39	
9	Vista Alegre	38	15	7	16	51	58	−7	37	
10	Gondomar	38	13	11	14	40	38	+2	37	
11	Fabril	38	13	11	14	37	35	+2	37	
12	Alondras	38	11	15	12	36	39	−3	37	
13	At. Orense	38	12	10	16	41	50	−9	34	
14	Portonovo SD	38	12	10	16	43	47	−4	34	
15	Flavia	38	10	13	15	26	32	−6	33	
16	Barco	38	8	17	13	32	43	−11	33	
17	Racing Ferrol	38	7	18	13	35	48	−13	32	
18	Boiro	38	10	10	18	35	55	−20	30	Relegation play-offs
19	Vivero	38	8	11	19	36	56	−20	27	Relegation play-offs
20	Corujo	38	6	9	23	31	68	−37	21	Relegation play-offs

=== Group 2 ===
Pos	Team	Pld	W	D	L	GF	GA	GD	Pts	Promotion or relegation
1	Caudal	38	22	14	2	55	20	+35	58	Promotion to the Segunda División B
2	Avilés Industrial	38	22	9	7	72	25	+47	53	Promotion to the Segunda División B
3	UP Langreo	38	23	7	8	82	36	+46	53	Promotion to the Segunda División B
4	Sporting Atlético	38	20	9	9	60	43	+17	49	
5	Siero	38	18	12	8	55	27	+28	48	
6	Hispano	38	17	11	10	47	35	+12	45	
7	Oviedo Aficionados	38	17	10	11	57	38	+19	44	
8	Lenense	38	15	10	13	53	47	+6	40	
9	El Entrego	38	14	10	14	45	47	−2	38	
10	Pumarín	38	11	14	13	53	61	−8	36	
11	Europa de Nava	38	13	9	16	51	63	−12	35	
12	Lugones	38	9	15	14	33	46	−13	33	
13	Mosconia	38	9	14	15	40	61	−21	32	
14	Marino	38	12	7	19	40	54	−14	31	
15	Piloñesa	38	8	15	15	28	46	−18	31	
16	Turón	38	9	12	17	25	38	−13	30	
17	Asturias de Blimea	38	9	12	17	25	41	−16	30	
18	San Martín	38	9	10	19	41	59	−18	28	Relegation play-offs
19	Ceares	38	5	18	15	27	54	−27	28	Relegation play-offs
20	Atlético Camocha	38	5	8	25	37	85	−48	18	Relegation play-offs

=== Group 3 ===
Pos	Team	Pld	W	D	L	GF	GA	GD	Pts	Promotion or relegation
1	Rayo Cantabria	38	32	2	4	85	25	+60	66	Promotion to the Segunda División B
2	Gim. Torrelavega	38	28	5	5	89	23	+66	61	Promotion to the Segunda División B
3	Laredo	38	24	9	5	77	27	+50	57	Promotion to the Segunda División B
4	Unión Club	38	19	9	10	60	38	+22	47	
5	Santoña	38	19	7	12	54	48	+6	45	
6	Ayrón Vargas	38	16	12	10	60	51	+9	44	
7	Castro	38	16	8	14	41	34	+7	40	
8	Barquereño	38	14	9	15	45	60	−15	37	
9	Cayón	38	13	10	15	43	52	−9	36	
10	Guarnizo	38	12	12	14	60	51	+9	36	
11	Textil Esc.	38	12	12	14	42	51	−9	36	
12	Naval	38	12	9	17	49	56	−7	33	
13	Reocín	38	11	10	17	41	50	−9	32	
14	Vimenor	38	11	10	17	34	55	−21	32	
15	Barreda	38	13	5	20	50	65	−15	31	
16	Albericia	38	8	14	16	36	48	−12	30	
17	Lope de Vega	38	10	9	19	34	59	−25	29	
18	Gama	38	11	7	20	51	79	−28	29	Relegation play-offs
19	San Martín Arena	38	7	10	21	36	70	−34	24	Relegation play-offs
20	Buelna	38	5	5	28	31	76	−45	15	Relegation play-offs

=== Group 4 ===
Pos	Team	Pld	W	D	L	GF	GA	GD	Pts	Promotion or relegation
1	Cult. Durango	38	16	19	3	49	20	+29	51	Promotion to the Segunda División B
2	Basconia	38	19	12	7	59	26	+33	50	Promotion to the Segunda División B
3	Lemona	38	20	8	10	69	36	+33	48	Promotion to the Segunda División B
4	Baracaldo	38	19	10	9	58	38	+20	48	
5	Amorebieta	38	19	10	9	74	44	+30	48	
6	Santurtzi	38	19	9	10	54	33	+21	47	
7	Dep. Alavés	38	17	13	8	58	37	+21	47	
8	Real Unión	38	16	9	13	39	34	+5	41	
9	Aurrerá Ond.	38	10	17	11	33	35	−2	37	
10	Aretxabaleta	38	15	6	17	34	50	−16	36	
11	Zalla	38	11	14	13	43	56	−13	36	
12	Arenas G.	38	13	9	16	40	43	−3	35	
13	Erandio	38	11	12	15	35	44	−9	34	
14	Portugalete	38	8	16	14	22	31	−9	32	
15	Hernani	38	9	13	16	39	54	−15	31	
16	Tolosa	38	11	8	19	36	53	−17	30	
17	Anaitasuna	38	10	10	18	23	43	−20	30	
18	Mutriku	38	8	13	17	26	52	−26	29	Relegation play-offs
19	Gernika	38	9	10	19	34	59	−25	28	Relegation play-offs
20	Santutxu	38	6	10	22	26	63	−37	22	Relegation play-offs

=== Group 5 ===
Pos	Team	Pld	W	D	L	GF	GA	GD	Pts	Promotion or relegation
1	Barcelona Af.	38	21	9	8	73	39	+34	51	Promotion to the Segunda División B
2	Mollerussa	38	18	13	7	66	49	+17	49	Promotion to the Segunda División B
3	Terrassa	38	16	14	8	60	48	+12	46	Promotion to the Segunda División B
4	Gim. Tarragona	38	16	14	8	43	33	+10	46	Promotion to the Segunda División B
5	Hospitalet	38	15	14	9	61	47	+14	44	Promotion to the Segunda División B
6	Júpiter	38	15	13	10	57	48	+9	43	Promotion to the Segunda División B
7	Girona	38	14	14	10	66	62	+4	42	Promotion to the Segunda División B
8	Andorra	38	15	12	11	47	48	−1	42	Promotion to the Segunda División B
9	Banyoles	38	15	11	12	59	48	+11	41	
10	Manresa	38	14	12	12	43	44	−1	40	
11	Lloret	38	15	10	13	58	59	−1	40	
12	Blanes	38	13	13	12	53	48	+5	39	
13	Igualada	38	12	13	13	55	56	−1	37	
14	Granollers	38	12	10	16	68	65	+3	34	
15	Gramanet	38	9	14	15	57	65	−8	32	
16	Manlleu	38	10	12	16	56	62	−6	32	
17	Vic	38	7	14	17	65	77	−12	28	
18	Prat	38	8	12	18	56	72	−16	28	Relegation play-offs
19	Reus	38	6	15	17	36	63	−27	27	Relegation play-offs
20	Sant Andreu	38	5	9	24	29	75	−46	19	Relegation play-offs

=== Group 6 ===
Pos	Team	Pld	W	D	L	GF	GA	GD	Pts	Promotion or relegation
1	Olímpic	38	29	6	3	73	22	+51	64	Promotion to the Segunda División B
2	Levante	38	20	14	4	66	21	+45	54	Promotion to the Segunda División B
3	Villarreal	38	20	9	9	64	34	+30	49	Promotion to the Segunda División B
4	Benidorm	38	16	15	7	47	28	+19	47	Promotion to the Segunda División B
5	Mestalla	38	19	8	11	56	39	+17	46	Promotion to the Segunda División B
6	Algemesí	38	16	11	11	55	45	+10	43	
7	Monóvar	38	14	14	10	36	27	+9	42	
8	Villajoyosa	38	17	8	13	48	40	+8	42	
9	Nules	38	13	15	10	40	35	+5	41	
10	Alicante	38	13	14	11	49	44	+5	40	
11	Requena	38	12	13	13	39	36	+3	37	
12	Burriana	38	10	12	16	37	53	−16	32	
13	Alacuás	38	11	10	17	41	67	−26	32	
14	Novelda	38	10	11	17	43	61	−18	31	
15	Onteniente	38	12	6	20	39	52	−13	30	
16	Castellón B	38	11	7	20	39	57	−18	29	
17	Benicarló	38	9	11	18	38	63	−25	29	
18	Vinaroz	38	7	15	16	29	46	−17	29	Relegation play-offs
19	Rayo Ibense	38	8	7	23	33	67	−34	23	Relegation play-offs
20	Catarroja	38	5	10	23	29	64	−35	20	Relegation play-offs

=== Group 7 ===
Pos	Team	Pld	W	D	L	GF	GA	GD	Pts	Promotion or relegation
1	Parla	38	23	13	2	82	27	+55	59	Promotion to the Segunda División B
2	Pegaso	38	25	7	6	79	37	+42	57	
3	Leganés	38	20	12	6	71	33	+38	52	Promotion to the Segunda División B
4	Alcalá	38	18	14	6	53	33	+20	50	Promotion to the Segunda División B
5	Conquense	38	20	9	9	66	38	+28	49	Promotion to the Segunda División B
6	Getafe	38	17	10	11	63	45	+18	44	Promotion to the Segunda División B
7	S.S. Reyes	38	15	13	10	44	35	+9	43	Promotion to the Segunda División B
8	R. Madrid Af.	38	15	11	12	59	46	+13	41	
9	Valdemoro	38	15	10	13	64	62	+2	40	
10	Villarrobledo	38	12	13	13	40	44	−4	37	
11	Daimiel	38	13	11	14	42	40	+2	37	Promotion to the Segunda División B
12	Calvo Sotelo	38	11	13	14	45	49	−4	35	
13	Manchego	38	12	11	15	44	56	−12	35	
14	Valdepeñas	38	11	12	15	32	38	−6	34	
15	Talavera	38	10	12	16	33	52	−19	32	
16	Maravillas	38	9	10	19	36	66	−30	28	
17	Alcorcón	38	7	13	18	33	58	−25	27	
18	Fuenlabrada	38	8	9	21	37	55	−18	25	Relegation play-offs
19	La Roda	38	8	5	25	39	71	−32	21	Relegation play-offs
20	Guadalajara	38	3	8	27	31	108	−77	14	Relegation play-offs

=== Group 8 ===
Pos	Team	Pld	W	D	L	GF	GA	GD	Pts	Promotion or relegation
1	Ponferradina	40	32	5	3	95	21	+74	69	Promotion to the Segunda División B
2	Cult. Leonesa	40	27	10	3	92	25	+67	64	Promotion to the Segunda División B
3	Ávila	40	23	12	5	82	24	+58	58	Promotion to the Segunda División B
4	Lermeño	40	21	11	8	71	45	+26	53	
5	Zamora	40	19	14	7	75	30	+45	52	
6	Cristo Olím.	40	18	14	8	48	23	+25	50	
7	Salmantino	40	18	11	11	77	44	+33	47	
8	Valladolid Pr.	40	18	10	12	74	43	+31	46	
9	Toreno	40	15	11	14	57	63	−6	41	
10	Gim. Segoviana	40	13	13	14	49	55	−6	39	
11	Briviesca	40	12	12	16	46	73	−27	36	
12	Astorga	40	12	10	18	56	62	−6	34	
13	Bembibre	40	14	6	20	51	68	−17	34	
14	Herrera	40	14	5	21	52	63	−11	33	
15	Ctral. León	40	10	13	17	32	48	−16	33	
16	Benavente	40	12	8	20	54	75	−21	32	
17	Laguna	40	10	10	20	47	71	−24	30	
18	Béjar Ind.	40	10	7	23	32	75	−43	27	Relegation play-offs
19	Universitario	40	9	8	23	32	83	−51	26	Relegation play-offs
20	Gim. Medinense	40	7	7	26	28	88	−60	21	Relegation play-offs
21	Guardo	40	5	5	30	27	98	−71	15	Relegation
W	Arandina	0	0	0	0	0	0	0	0	Withdrawn

=== Group 9 ===
Pos	Team	Pld	W	D	L	GF	GA	GD	Pts	Promotion or relegation
1	Linares	38	27	7	4	79	22	+57	61	Promotion to the Segunda División B
2	Marbella	38	25	10	3	68	23	+45	60	Promotion to the Segunda División B
3	UD Melilla	38	21	15	2	47	13	+34	57	Promotion to the Segunda División B
4	Ronda	38	22	8	8	63	36	+27	52	Promotion to the Segunda División B
5	Jaén	38	20	6	12	69	41	+28	46	
6	Martos	38	17	7	14	65	48	+17	41	
7	Mijas	38	14	11	13	51	45	+6	39	
8	San Pedro	38	15	9	14	45	42	+3	39	
9	At. Malagueño	38	15	7	16	56	40	+16	37	
10	La Zubia	38	14	9	15	53	63	−10	37	
11	Roquetas	38	13	8	17	39	47	−8	34	
12	Antequerano	38	11	11	16	40	58	−18	33	
13	Coín	38	10	11	17	48	57	−9	31	
14	Úbeda	38	12	7	19	43	53	−10	31	
15	Estepona	38	12	5	21	38	59	−21	29	
16	Benamiel	38	8	12	18	32	58	−26	28	
17	Baza	38	9	10	19	35	57	−22	28	
18	Torremolinos	38	10	7	21	38	64	−26	27	Relegation play-offs
19	Villanueva	38	9	8	21	29	60	−31	26	Relegation play-offs
20	At. Macael	38	8	8	22	33	85	−52	24	Relegation play-offs

=== Group 10 ===
Pos	Team	Pld	W	D	L	GF	GA	GD	Pts	Promotion or relegation
1	Sevilla At.	38	25	8	5	87	24	+63	58	Promotion to the Segunda División B
2	Betis Dep.	38	26	6	6	97	31	+66	58	Promotion to the Segunda División B
3	Sanluqueño	38	20	11	7	56	37	+19	51	Promotion to the Segunda División B
4	Bollullos	38	20	10	8	56	30	+26	50	
5	Cádiz B	38	18	12	8	69	34	+35	48	
6	Utrera	38	16	14	8	55	31	+24	46	
7	Ayamonte	38	18	8	12	43	40	+3	44	
8	Coria	38	16	11	11	62	51	+11	43	
9	Dos Hermanas	38	15	13	10	52	46	+6	43	
10	Pilas	38	12	18	8	37	34	+3	42	
11	San Fernando	38	15	11	12	43	32	+11	41	
12	Palma Río	38	10	14	14	32	50	−18	34	
13	Brenes	38	13	7	18	39	59	−20	33	
14	Mairena	38	11	11	16	34	46	−12	33	
15	Portuense	38	9	9	20	47	64	−17	27	
16	Rota	38	7	11	20	33	61	−28	25	
17	Moguer	38	9	5	24	36	63	−27	23	
18	Pozoblanco	38	7	8	23	32	64	−32	22	Relegation play-offs
19	Egabrense	38	7	7	24	31	89	−58	21	Relegation play-offs
20	África Ceutí	38	3	12	23	35	90	−55	18	Relegation play-offs

=== Group 11 ===
Pos	Team	Pld	W	D	L	GF	GA	GD	Pts	Promotion or relegation
1	Sp. Mahonés	38	27	5	6	87	27	+60	59	Promotion to the Segunda División B
2	At. Baleares	38	19	12	7	70	45	+25	50	Promotion to the Segunda División B
3	Badía	38	17	15	6	55	31	+24	49	Promotion to the Segunda División B
4	Constancia	38	19	10	9	70	36	+34	48	Promotion to the Segunda División B
5	Santa Eulalia	38	17	14	7	64	35	+29	48	
6	Portmany	38	16	11	11	59	46	+13	43	
7	Alayor	38	15	10	13	57	47	+10	40	
8	Manacor	38	16	7	15	66	69	−3	39	
9	Alaró	38	15	9	14	59	68	−9	39	
10	Ferrerías	38	13	13	12	44	42	+2	39	
11	Ibiza	38	13	11	14	44	45	−1	37	
12	Murense	38	14	6	18	50	62	−12	34	
13	Hospitalet	38	11	11	16	38	48	−10	33	
14	Santañy	38	11	11	16	34	59	−25	33	
15	Calviá	38	9	13	16	42	51	−9	31	
16	Escolar	38	10	10	18	47	73	−26	30	
17	Son Sardina	38	6	17	15	29	44	−15	29	
18	Montuiri	38	10	9	19	36	59	−23	29	Relegation play-offs
19	Sóller	38	8	11	19	39	74	−35	27	Relegation play-offs
20	Isleño	38	7	9	22	32	61	−29	23	Relegation play-offs

=== Group 12 ===
Pos	Team	Pld	W	D	L	GF	GA	GD	Pts	Promotion or relegation
1	Maspalomas	38	23	9	6	98	41	+57	55	Promotion to the Segunda División B
2	Las Palmas At.	38	23	7	8	88	23	+65	53	Promotion to the Segunda División B
3	Telde	38	20	11	7	77	28	+49	51	Promotion to the Segunda División B
4	Laguna	38	21	4	13	61	51	+10	46	
5	Mensajero	38	19	7	12	61	38	+23	45	
6	Tenisca	38	18	9	11	55	43	+12	45	
7	Puerto Cruz	38	17	11	10	56	46	+10	45	
8	Ferreras	38	18	5	15	61	49	+12	41	
9	Lanzarote	38	14	9	15	55	59	−4	37	
10	Arucas	38	13	9	16	52	53	−1	35	
11	Salud	38	15	5	18	50	65	−15	35	
12	Unión Tejina	38	14	7	17	51	67	−16	35	
13	Ibarra	38	14	7	17	48	57	−9	35	
14	Icodense	38	13	9	16	43	59	−16	35	
15	Güimar	38	12	10	16	42	63	−21	34	
16	Marino	38	13	8	17	48	51	−3	34	
17	San Andrés	38	13	8	17	49	58	−9	34	
18	Orotava	38	14	4	20	43	58	−15	32	Relegation play-offs
19	Silense	38	6	8	24	26	97	−71	20	Relegation play-offs
20	Tacoronte	38	4	5	29	29	87	−58	13	Relegation play-offs

=== Group 13 ===
Pos	Team	Pld	W	D	L	GF	GA	GD	Pts	Promotion or relegation
1	Cieza	38	23	11	4	73	26	+47	57	Promotion to the Segunda División B
2	Eldense	38	20	15	3	64	19	+45	55	Promotion to the Segunda División B
3	Lorca	38	19	15	4	50	20	+30	53	Promotion to the Segunda División B
4	Torrevieja	38	20	10	8	57	29	+28	50	
5	Torre Pacheco	38	16	12	10	57	43	+14	44	
6	Cox	38	14	15	9	42	37	+5	43	
7	Bigastro	38	13	14	11	40	28	+12	40	
8	Callosa	38	15	7	16	45	49	−4	37	
9	Almansa	38	9	19	10	37	40	−3	37	
10	Santomera	38	14	9	15	45	50	−5	37	
11	Yeclano	38	13	10	15	45	49	−4	36	
12	Imperial	38	11	13	14	42	52	−10	35	
13	Torreagüera	38	11	11	16	38	59	−21	33	
14	Águilas	38	11	11	16	41	56	−15	33	
15	Orihuela	38	11	11	16	37	50	−13	33	
16	Naval	38	11	11	16	48	66	−18	33	
17	Ilicitano	38	10	11	17	46	54	−8	31	
18	Horadada	38	9	13	16	40	52	−12	31	
19	Dolores	38	9	9	20	42	60	−18	27	
20	At. Albacete	38	3	9	26	30	80	−50	15	Relegation play-offs

=== Group 14 ===
Pos	Team	Pld	W	D	L	GF	GA	GD	Pts	Promotion or relegation
1	Cacereño	38	27	10	1	96	8	+88	64	Promotion to the Segunda División B
2	Badajoz	38	29	4	5	132	22	+110	62	Promotion to the Segunda División B
3	Plasencia	38	23	10	5	80	24	+56	56	Promotion to the Segunda División B
4	Extremadura	38	20	14	4	57	26	+31	54	
5	Sanvicenteño	38	18	11	9	55	43	+12	47	
6	Moralo	38	20	7	11	58	45	+13	47	
7	Montijo	38	19	6	13	56	36	+20	44	
8	Atalaya	38	18	8	12	55	51	+4	44	
9	Don Benito	38	16	10	12	64	53	+11	42	
10	La Estrella	38	15	9	14	60	57	+3	39	
11	Vasco Núñez	38	12	14	12	48	48	0	38	
12	Mérida	38	16	5	17	53	59	−6	37	
13	Fuente Cantos	38	12	11	15	44	65	−21	35	
14	Díter Zafra	38	12	6	20	40	60	−20	30	
15	Villanovense	38	11	5	22	40	72	−32	27	
16	Puebla Patria	38	8	9	21	32	56	−24	25	
17	Aceuchal	38	4	12	22	29	73	−44	20	
18	Azuaga	38	7	5	26	22	84	−62	19	Relegation play-offs
19	Guareña	38	5	5	28	39	108	−69	15	Relegation play-offs
20	La Albuera	38	4	7	27	33	103	−70	15	Relegation play-offs

=== Group 15 ===
Pos	Team	Pld	W	D	L	GF	GA	GD	Pts	Promotion or relegation
1	Osasuna Pr.	38	23	6	9	76	38	+38	52	Promotion to the Segunda División B
2	Arnedo	38	20	12	6	66	36	+30	52	Promotion to the Segunda División B
3	Mirandés	38	22	7	9	85	46	+39	51	Promotion to the Segunda División B
4	Calahorra	38	20	9	9	75	47	+28	49	
5	Chantrea	38	19	10	9	78	50	+28	48	
6	Tudelano	38	17	10	11	63	51	+12	44	
7	Izarra	38	17	10	11	67	64	+3	44	
8	Alfaro	38	16	12	10	65	50	+15	44	
9	Corellano	38	17	8	13	59	50	+9	42	
10	San Juan	38	14	13	11	71	56	+15	41	
11	Berceo	38	12	12	14	45	60	−15	36	
12	Peña Sport	38	12	11	15	52	57	−5	35	
13	Egüés	38	11	13	14	50	59	−9	35	
14	Burladés	38	9	13	16	38	56	−18	31	
15	Urroztarra	38	10	10	18	65	94	−29	30	
16	Cirbonero	38	8	13	17	49	82	−33	29	
17	Oberena	38	9	11	18	57	67	−10	29	
18	Iruña	38	8	11	19	49	81	−32	27	Relegation play-offs
19	Alsasua	38	6	10	22	31	64	−33	22	Relegation play-offs
20	Noaín	38	4	11	23	34	67	−33	19	Relegation play-offs

=== Group 16 ===
Pos	Team	Pld	W	D	L	GF	GA	GD	Pts	Promotion or relegation
1	Endesa Andorra	38	28	8	2	97	19	+78	64	Promotion to the Segunda División B
2	Teruel	38	26	5	7	66	38	+28	57	Promotion to the Segunda División B
3	Fraga	38	24	6	8	72	37	+35	54	Promotion to the Segunda División B
4	Binéfar	38	21	10	7	80	39	+41	52	
5	Barbastro	38	18	12	8	72	45	+27	48	
6	Sabiñánigo	38	18	9	11	68	48	+20	45	
7	Huesca	38	16	8	14	61	51	+10	40	
8	Numancia	38	14	11	13	54	44	+10	39	
9	Caspe	38	13	9	16	47	46	+1	35	
10	Illueca	38	14	7	17	49	46	+3	35	
11	Mallén	38	11	12	15	45	58	−13	34	
12	Ejea	38	13	8	17	56	64	−8	34	
13	Sariñena	38	12	8	18	46	59	−13	32	
14	Calatayud	38	13	5	20	46	70	−24	31	
15	Alcañiz	38	11	9	18	49	69	−20	31	
16	Mequinenza	38	10	10	18	49	69	−20	30	
17	Almazán	38	10	10	18	35	65	−30	30	
18	Monzón	38	7	11	20	44	80	−36	25	Relegation play-offs
19	Tarazona	38	8	8	22	51	84	−33	24	Relegation play-offs
20	Estadilla	38	7	6	25	27	83	−56	20	Relegation play-offs
