= 1980 Copa del Rey final =

Copa del Rey 1980 final
- Event: 1979–80 Copa del Rey
| Real Madrid | Castilla |
| 6 | 1 |
- Date: 4 June 1980
- Venue: Santiago Bernabéu Stadium, Madrid, Spain
- Referee: Ángel Franco Martínez
- Attendance: 65,000

The 1980 Copa del Rey final was the 78th final of the King's Cup, Spain's premier football competition. The final was played at Santiago Bernabéu Stadium in Madrid, on 4 June 1980, and was won by Real Madrid, who beat their own reserve team Castilla 6–1.

== Match ==
=== Summary ===
According to Euan McTear of These Football Times "Castilla were a shadow of the vibrant side that had thrilled the Spanish capital and the country throughout the previous few months".

"The fact we had reached the final meant that Real Madrid were guaranteed to take us very seriously. Truth is that the 6–1 result is a reflection of the distance between us and them."

— According to Castilla's Ricardo Gallego, it was "an impossible task" to actually defeat the senior side.

With goals from Juanito and Santillana, Castilla fell to a 2–0 deficit by half-time. After 45 minutes of play, Andrés Sabido and Vicente del Bosque added a third and a fourth either side of the hour mark to create a broad gap between the two sides.

Castilla's Ricardo Álvarez managed to close the wide margin with ten minutes remaining. According to McTear this gesture just provoked the senior side, who had been winding the clock down for the last minutes. Seconds after Castilla scored, substitute Francisco García Hernández made it 5–1 before a last minute Juanito penalty sealed off a 6–1 triumph. After the final whistle both teams celebrated with the trophy.

=== Details ===
4 June 1980
20:30 CET

| Real Madrid | 6–1 | Castilla |
|---|---|---|
| Juanito 20', 89' (pen.); Santillana 42'; Sabido 59'; Del Bosque 62'; García Hernández 82' | Report (in Spanish) | Álvarez 80' |

Santiago Bernabéu, Madrid
Attendance: 65,000
Referee: Ángel Franco Martínez

| Real Madrid | Castilla |

Real Madrid:
| GK | 1 | (Spain) Mariano García Remón |
| DF | 2 | (Spain) Andrés Sabido |
| DF | 5 | (Spain) Gregorio Benito |
| DF | 4 | (Spain) Pirri (c) |
| DF | 3 | (Spain) José Antonio Camacho |
| MF | 6 | (Spain) Vicente del Bosque |
| MF | 10 | (West Germany) Uli Stielike | (substituted off) 63' |
| MF | 8 | (Spain) Ángel |
| FW | 7 | (Spain) Juanito |
| FW | 9 | (Spain) Santillana |
| FW | 11 | (England) Laurie Cunningham | (substituted off) 82' |
Substitutes:
| MF | 14 | (Spain) Francisco García Hernández | (substituted on) 63' |
| FW | 15 | (Spain) Roberto Martínez | (substituted on) 82' |
Manager:
(Socialist Federal Republic of Yugoslavia) Vujadin Boškov

Castilla:
| GK | 1 | (Spain) Agustín |
| DF | 2 | (Spain) Juanito |
| DF | 4 | (Spain) Javier Castañeda (c) |
| DF | 5 | (Spain) Enrique Herrero |
| DF | 3 | (Spain) Casimiro |
| MF | 7 | (Spain) Ricardo Álvarez |
| MF | 6 | (Spain) Ricardo Gallego |
| MF | 10 | (Spain) Miguel Bernal |
| FW | 8 | (Spain) Francisco Pineda |
| FW | 9 | (Spain) Paco | (substituted off) 46' |
| FW | 11 | (Spain) Valentín Cidón | (substituted off) 73' |
Substitutes:
| MF | 14 | (Spain) José Sánchez Lorenzo | (substituted on) 46' |
| FW | 15 | (Spain) Balín | (substituted on) 73' |
Manager:
(Spain) Juanjo García Santos

MATCH RULES

- 90 minutes.
- 30 minutes of extra-time if necessary.
- Penalty shoot-out if scores still level.
- Four named substitutes.
- Maximum of two substitutions.
