= Ricardo Álvarez (footballer, born 1957) =

Spanish footballer

Personal information
- Full name: Ricardo Álvarez de Mena
- Date of birth: 26 October 1957 (age 69)
- Place of birth: Madrid, Spain
- Height: 1.70 m (5 ft 7 in)
- Position: Midfielder

Senior career*
Years	Team	Apps	(Gls)
1979–1982	Real Madrid Castilla	83	(21)
1982–1983	Racing de Santander	23	(3)
1983–1985	Hércules	38	(2)
1985–1986	Palencia	36	(6)
1987–1992	Ávila	142	(25)
Total		322	(57)
- * Club domestic league appearances and goals

Ricardo Álvarez de Mena (born 26 October 1957) is a retired Spanish footballer who played as a midfielder. He's most famously known for being the only goalscorer of a reserve team in a Copa del Rey final, scoring the only goal for Real Madrid Castilla in the 1980 Copa del Rey final.

== Career statistics ==
=== Club ===
Club	Season	League			National Cup		League Cup		Other		Total	
Club	Season	Division	Apps	Goals	Apps	Goals	Apps	Goals	Apps	Goals	Apps	Goals
Real Madrid Castilla	1979–80	Segunda División	30	7	–		–		0	0	30	7
Real Madrid Castilla	1980–81	Segunda División	19	10	–		–		2 (Note: Appearances in the UEFA Cup Winners' Cup)	0	21	10
Real Madrid Castilla	1981–82	Segunda División	34	4	–		–		0	0	34	4
Real Madrid Castilla	Total		83	21	0	0	0	0	2	0	85	21
Racing de Santander	1982–83	La Liga	23	3	0	0	0	0	0	0	23	3
Hércules	1983–84	Segunda División	32	2	0	0	1 (Note: Appearances in the Copa de la Liga Second Division)	0	0	0	33	2
Hércules	1984–85	La Liga	6	0	6 (Note: Appearances in the Copa del Rey)	1	2 (Note: Appearances in the Copa de la Liga)	0	0	0	14	1
Hércules	Total		38	2	6	1	3	0	0	0	47	3
Palencia	1985–86	Segunda División B	36	6	0	0	0	0	0	0	36	6
Ávila	1987–88	Segunda División B	36	8	4	2	–		0	0	40	10
Ávila	1988–89	Segunda División B	35	5	6	1	–		0	0	41	6
Ávila	1989–90	Segunda División B	30	10	0	0	–		0	0	30	10
Ávila	1990–91	Segunda División B	35	2	7	1	–		0	0	42	3
Ávila	1991–92	Segunda División B	6	0	0	0	–		0	0	6	0
Ávila	Total		142	25	17	4	0	0	2	0	159	29
Career total			322	57	23	5	3	0	2	0	350	62
