= Juanito (footballer, born 1961) =

Spanish footballer

Personal information
- Full name: Juan Antonio Felipe Gallego
- Date of birth: 24 August 1961 (age 65)
- Place of birth: Madrid, Spain
- Height: 1.74 m (5 ft 9 in)
- Position: Right-back

Youth career
- Real Madrid

Senior career*
| Years | Team | Apps | (Gls) |
| 1979–1984 | Castilla | 106 | (0) |
| 1982–1983 | Real Madrid | 1 | (0) |
| 1982–1983 | → Oviedo (loan) | 38 | (0) |
| 1984–1987 | Oviedo | 107 | (4) |
| 1987–1990 | Rayo Vallecano | 60 | (7) |
| Total | | 312 | (11) |

International career
| 1981 | Spain U19 | 2 | (1) |
| 1981–1982 | Spain U21 | 4 | (0) |
| 1980 | Spain U23 | 1 | (0) |
- * Club domestic league appearances and goals

Juan Antonio Felipe Gallego (born 24 August 1961), known as Juanito, is a Spanish former professional footballer who played as a right-back.

== Club career ==
Juanito was born in Madrid, being a product of Real Madrid CF's academy. He spent 10 of his 11 seasons as a senior in the Segunda División, starting with Castilla in 1979–80.

On 11 April 1982, Juanito made his only competitive appearance with Real's first team, starting in a 2–1 away win against CD Castellón. Previously, he had helped the reserves to reach the final of the 1979–80 Copa del Rey against the parent club, losing 6–1; they thus qualified for the subsequent edition of the UEFA Cup Winners' Cup, where the player featured in the 3–1 first-round victory over West Ham United and retired at the hour mark with a patella fracture.

Following a one-year loan at Real Oviedo, Juanito signed permanently with the Asturias side in summer 1984. He joined fellow second-tier Rayo Vallecano for the 1987–88 campaign; during his tenure, he experienced both promotion and relegation, shared teams with the likes of Laurie Cunningham and Diego Maradona's brother Hugo and notably scored twice in a 3–3 draw with Castilla on 24 April 1988 (once in his own net).

Juanito retired at the end of 1989–90 aged only 29 due to injuries, with Rayo having finished last. He scored his first goal in the Spanish top flight on 24 September 1989, opening an eventual 1–1 home draw against Oviedo.

== International career ==
Juanito represented Spain at the 1980 Summer Olympics held in the Soviet Union, being eliminated at the end of the group stage with three matches and three draws.

== Honours ==
Castilla

- Segunda División: 1983–84
