= Ángel Carvajal =

Ángel Carvajal may refer to:

- Ángel Carvajal Bernal (1901–1985), Mexican politician
- Ángel Carvajal García (born 2004), Spanish footballer
- Ángel Carvajal y Fernández de Córdoba, Spanish politician and noble, minister of development in 1883–1884
