= Casimiro Torres =

Casimiro Torres may refer to:

- Casimiro Torres (Chilean footballer) (1905–1977)
- Casimiro Torres (Spanish footballer) (born 1959)
