= Miguel Bernal =

Miguel Bernal may refer to:

- Miguel Bernal (footballer) (born 1958), Spanish footballer
- Miguel Bernal Jiménez (1910–1956), Mexican composer
