= Sergio Mestre =

Sergio Mestre may refer to:

- Sergio Mestre (high jumper) (born 1991), Cuban high jumper
- Sergio Mestre (footballer) (born 2005), Spanish footballer
