= Balín =

Spanish footballer

Personal information
- Full name: Cristóbal Machín Fernández de la Puente
- Date of birth: 11 November 1957 (age 68)
- Place of birth: Palma de Mallorca, Spain
- Height: 1.76 m (5 ft 9 in)
- Position: Forward

Senior career*
Years	Team	Apps	(Gls)
1979–1983	Real Madrid Castilla	46	(2)
1981–1982	→ Osasuna (loan)	9	(0)
1983–1985	Salamanca	23	(0)
Total		78	(2)
- * Club domestic league appearances and goals

Cristóbal Machín Fernández de la Puente (born 11 November 1957), commonly known as Balín, is a Spanish former footballer who played as a forward.

== Career statistics ==
=== Club ===
Club	Season	League			National Cup		League Cup		Other		Total	
Club	Season	Division	Apps	Goals	Apps	Goals	Apps	Goals	Apps	Goals	Apps	Goals
Real Madrid Castilla	1979–80	Segunda División	22	1	–		–		0	0	22	1
Real Madrid Castilla	1980–81	Segunda División	23	1	–		–		2 (Note: Appearances in the UEFA Cup Winners' Cup)	1	25	2
Real Madrid Castilla	1981–82	Segunda División	0	0	–		–		0	0	0	0
Real Madrid Castilla	1982–83	Segunda División	12	0	–		1 (Note: Appearances in the Copa de la Liga Second Division)	0	0	0	13	0
Real Madrid Castilla	Total		83	21	0	0	0	0	2	0	85	21
Osasuna (loan)	1981–82	La Liga	9	0	0	0	0	0	0	0	9	0
Salamanca	1983–84	La Liga	12	0	0	0	2 (Note: Appearances in the Copa de la Liga)	0	0	0	14	0
Salamanca	1984–85	Segunda División	11	0	2 (Note: Appearances in the Copa del Rey)	0	2	0	0	0	15	0
Salamanca	Total		23	0	2	0	4	0	0	0	29	0
Career total			78	2	2	0	5	0	2	1	87	3
