= Enrique Herrero =

Enrique Herrero may refer to:

- Enrique Herrero (footballer, born 1959), Spanish footballer
- Enrique Herrero (footballer, born 2005), Spanish footballer

== See also ==
- Enrique Herrera
- Enrique Herreros
