= Enrique Herrera =

Enrique Herrera may refer to:

- Enrique Olaya Herrera (1880–1937), Colombian journalist, politician and President of Colombia
- Enrique Herrera (actor) (1904–1991), Cuban film actor in Mexico
- Enrique Herrera (wrestler), Peruvian wrestler

== See also ==
- Enrique Herrero
- Enrique Herreros
