= Enrique Herrero (footballer, born 1959) =

Spanish association football player

Personal information
- Full name: Enrique Herrero Cuartango
- Date of birth: 31 October 1959 (age 67)
- Place of birth: Miranda de Ebro, Spain
- Height: 1.86 m (6 ft 1 in)
- Position: Centre back

Senior career*
Years	Team	Apps	(Gls)
1979–1981	Castilla	34	(2)
1981–1983	Salamanca	38	(1)
1983–1984	Murcia	6	(0)
1984–1988	Oviedo	127	(4)
1988–1989	Tenerife	34	(0)
1989–1992	Hércules	86	(6)
Total		325	(13)
- * Club domestic league appearances and goals

Enrique Herrero Cuartango (born 31 October 1959) is a Spanish former footballer who played as a defender.

He made 27 La Liga appearances for Salamanca and Murcia. In the Segunda División, he played 212 games and scored 7 goals, for Castilla, Salamanca, Oviedo and Tenerife, and won promotion three times.

== Career ==
Born in Miranda de Ebro in the Province of Burgos, Herrero was a youth player at Real Madrid. He began his senior career with the reserve team, Castilla, in the Segunda División. In his debut season, he was part of their team that reached the 1980 final of the Copa del Rey; he scored in a 6–1 home win over CF Extremadura in the second leg of the first round on 31 October. He played in the final on 4 June as they lost by that score to their parent club.

In 1981, Castilla renovated the squad, removing several players in order to start again with new players. Herrero moved to UD Salamanca in his native Castile and León, with his new team aiming for promotion to La Liga. After doing so and playing his first top-flight season, he transferred to Real Murcia in 1983.

Herrero transferred to Real Oviedo in the second tier in July 1984. He remained at the Asturian club for four years, playing 155 official matches and winning promotion to La Liga in his final campaign.

In July 1988, Herrero signed a two-year deal with CD Tenerife. In his one season in the Canary Islands, he partnered Nino Lema in central defence and helped the club return to the top flight after 27 years away.
