= Joan Martínez (footballer, born 2007) =

Spanish footballer (born 2007)

Personal information
- Full name: Joan Martínez Lozano
- Date of birth: 20 August 2007 (age 19)
- Place of birth: Alginet, Valencia, Spain
- Height: 1.90 m (6 ft 3 in)
- Position: Center-back

Team information
- Current team: Real Madrid B
- Number: 5

Youth career
- 2013–2014: UD Alginet
- 2014–2023: Levante
- 2021–2022: → Patacona CF (loan)
- 2023–2025: Real Madrid

Senior career*
Years	Team	Apps	(Gls)
2024–2025	Real Madrid C	1	(0)
2025–	Real Madrid B	30	(3)

International career^{‡}
2023–2024	Spain U17	11	(0)
- * Club domestic league appearances and goals as of 30 November 2025 ‡ National team caps and goals as of 06:39, 8 September 2024 (UTC)

Joan Martínez Lozano (born 20 August 2007) is a Spanish footballer who plays as a defender for Real Madrid Castilla.

== Early life ==
He was born in 2007 in Alginet, Valencian Community, Spain. He has regarded Spain international Sergio Ramos as his football idol.

== Club career ==
As a youth player, he joined the youth academy of Spanish side Levante. After that, he joined the youth academy of Spanish La Liga side Real Madrid.

Martínez made his debut with the senior team during a preseason tour in the United States in a friendly fixture versus AC Milan on 1 August 2024. Days later, on 9 August 2024, he suffered a cruciate ligament injury in one of his knees while training with the first team. He underwent surgery in September 2024.

One year after recovery from injury, he was promoted to reserved team ahead 2025–26 season.

== International career ==
He is a Spain youth international. He is regarded as one of the Spain national under-17 football team's most important defenders.

== Style of play ==
He mainly operates as a defender. He is known for his aerial ability.

== Personal life ==
He has an older brother. He is the son of a physiotherapist father.

== Career statistics ==
As of match played 30 March 2024

Appearances and goals by club, season and competition
Club	Season	League			Other		Total	
Club	Season	Division	Apps	Goals	Apps	Goals	Apps	Goals
Real Madrid C	2023–24	Tercera Federación	1	0	—		1	0
Career total			1	0	0	0	1	0
