= Julián López de Lerma =

Spanish footballer

Personal information
- Full name: Julián López de Lerma Barahona
- Date of birth: 27 February 1987 (age 39)
- Place of birth: Badajoz, Spain
- Height: 1.78 m (5 ft 10 in)
- Position: Midfielder

Team information
- Current team: Real Madrid B (manager)

Youth career
- Flecha Negra
- 2003–2006: Espanyol

Senior career*
Years	Team	Apps	(Gls)
2006–2011	Espanyol B		
2006–2011	Espanyol	7	(0)
2007–2008	→ Sevilla B (loan)	8	(0)
2009	→ Panthrakikos (loan)	8	(0)
2011	Rubí		

Managerial career
- 2012–2023: Espanyol (youth)
- 2023–2024: Espanyol B (assistant)
- 2024–2026: Real Madrid (youth)
- 2026–: Real Madrid B
- * Club domestic league appearances and goals

Julián López de Lerma Barahona (born 27 February 1987) is a Spanish former professional footballer who played as a midfielder. He is the current manager of Primera Federación club Real Madrid Castilla.

== Playing career ==
López was born in Badajoz, Extremadura. After graduating from Espanyol's youth system, he made his first-team debut in 2006–07, playing seven La Liga matches mostly always as a late substitute (he was initially summoned for the 2007 UEFA Cup final against Sevilla, but eventually did not make the final list of 18). For the following season, he was loaned to Sevilla Atlético in the Segunda División, appearing rarely due to a severe injury.

In January 2009, having made no competitive appearances for the Catalans during the first half of the campaign, López served another loan, now with Greek side Panthrakikos, and again suffered a physical setback, fracturing his right leg. After returning to the RCDE Stadium, whilst training with the reserves, he was again seriously injured.

On 3 March 2011, following a failed move to Gavà, López terminated his contract and signed with amateurs Rubí. In July, aged only 24, he retired from football due to his constant problems with injuries.

== Coaching career ==
López returned to his main club Espanyol in early November 2011, working as scout in its academy. He became manager of their youth sides the following year, before joining Manolo González's staff at the reserves in July 2023 as assistant.

In July 2024, López moved to the structure of Real Madrid, being appointed at the Juvenil B squad. He took over the A team one year later, and became head coach of the senior reserves in the Primera Federación on 14 January 2026 after Álvaro Arbeloa was promoted to the main squad.

== Managerial statistics ==
As of 25 April 2026

Managerial record by team and tenure
Team	Nat	From	To	Record								Ref
Team	Nat	From	To	G	W	D	L	GF	GA	GD	Win %	Ref
Real Madrid B	(Spain)	13 January 2026	Present	15	5	7	3	29	18	+11	33.33	
Total				15	5	7	3	29	18	+11	33.33	—
