= Alginet =

- Municipality
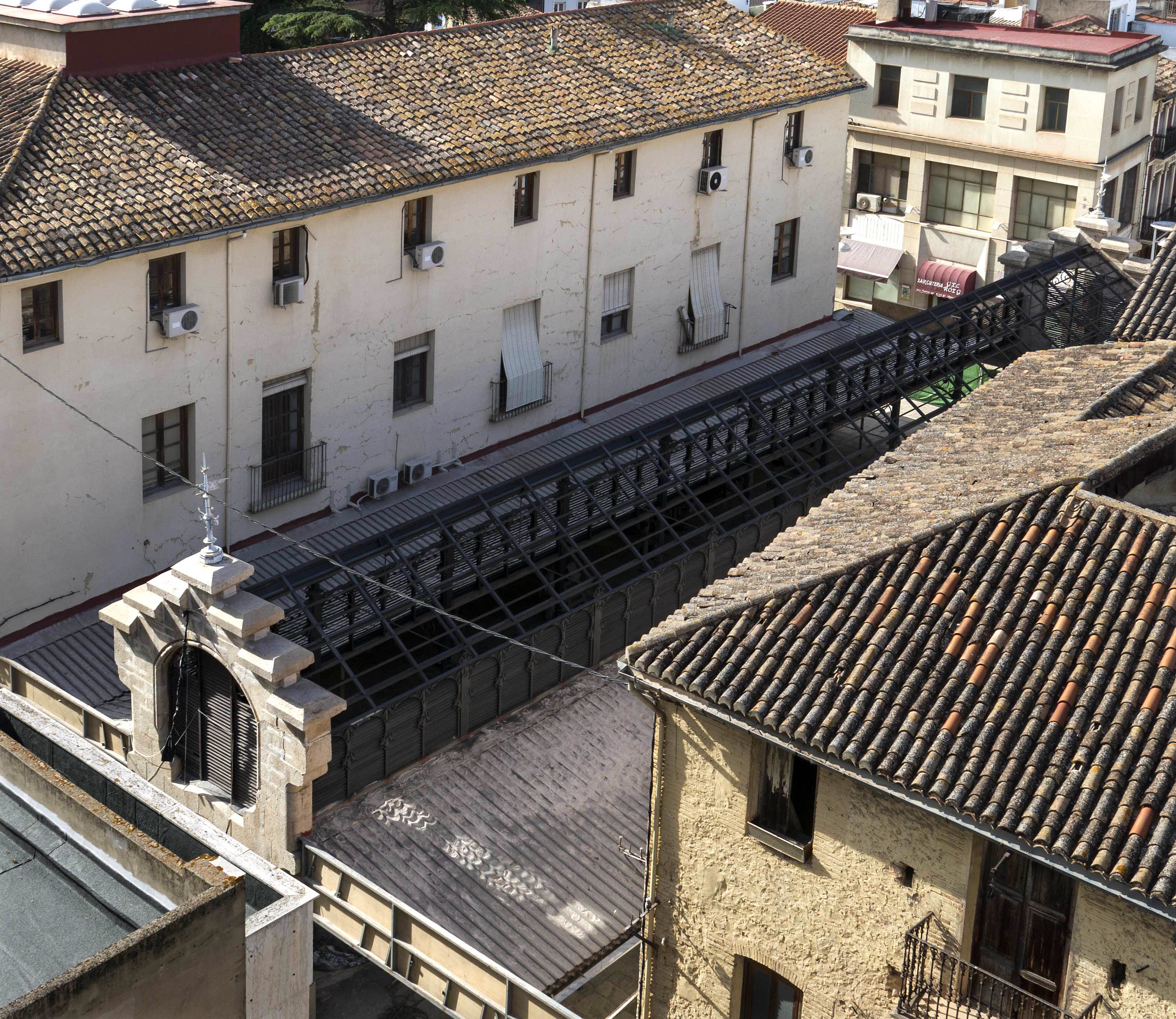

- Flag Coat of arms

- Location in Spain
- Coordinates: 39°15′45″N 0°28′6″W
- Country: Spain
- Autonomous community: Valencian Community
- Province: Valencia
- Comarca: Ribera Alta
- Judicial district: Carlet
- Founded: 33 BC

Government
  - Alcalde: Jesús Boluda (2011) (BLOC-Compromís)

Area
  - Total: 24.1 km^{2} (9.3 sq mi)
- Elevation: 150 m (490 ft)

Population (2025-01-01)
  - Total: 14,844
  - Density: 616/km^{2} (1,600/sq mi)
- Demonyms: Alginetí, alginetina
- Time zone: UTC+1 (CET)
  - Summer (DST): UTC+2 (CEST)
- Postal code: 46230
- Official language(s): Valencian
- Website: Official website

Alginet (Valencian: [aʎdʒiˈnet]; Spanish: [alxiˈnet]) is a municipality in the comarca of Ribera Alta in the Valencian Community, Spain.

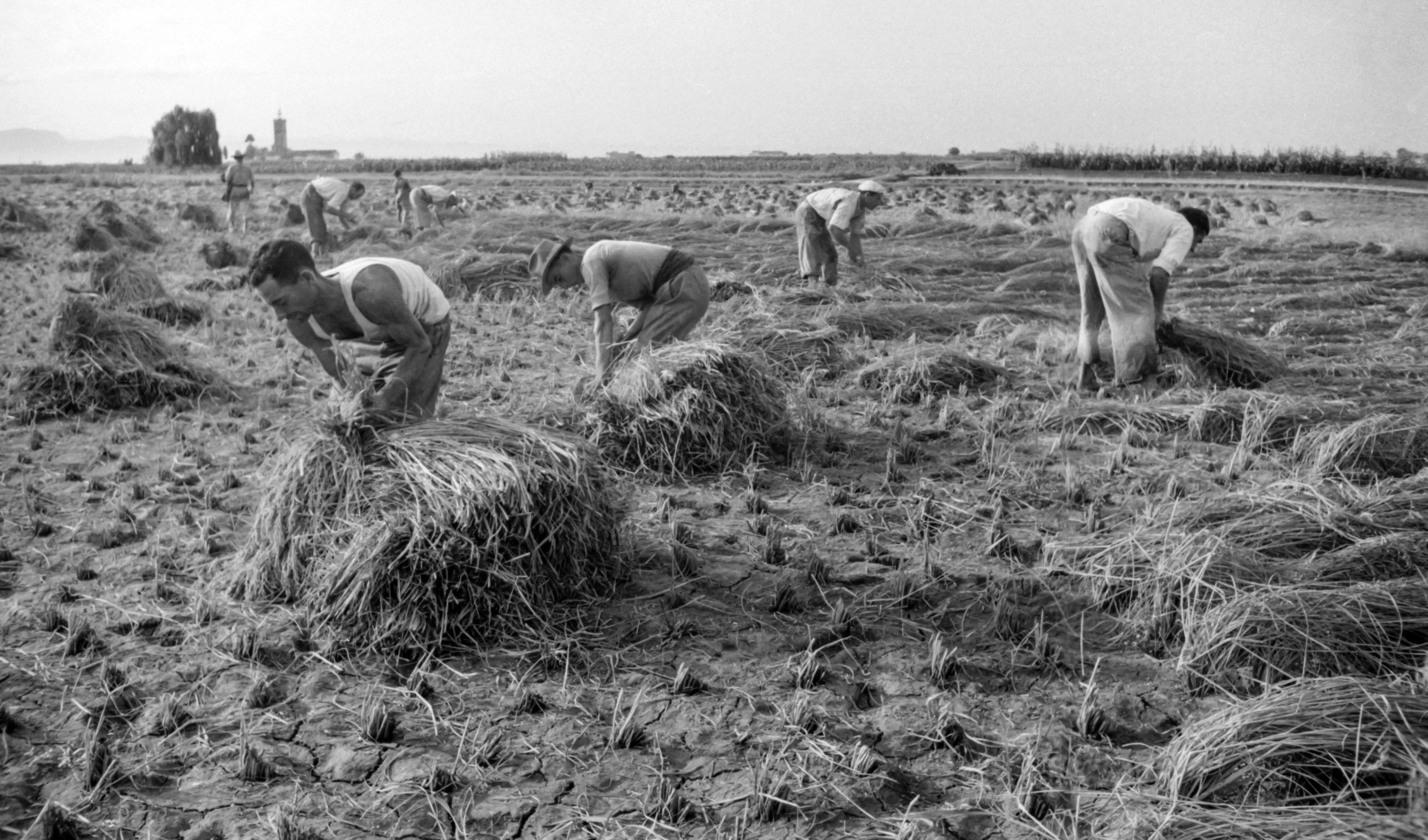
Harvesting rice in Alginet, 1953

== Notable people ==
- Joan Martínez, footballer

== See also ==
- List of municipalities in Valencia
