= Casimiro Torres (Spanish footballer) =

Spanish footballer (born 1959)

Personal information
- Full name: Casimiro Torres Ibáñez
- Date of birth: 18 June 1959 (age 67)
- Place of birth: Torrevieja, Spain
- Height: 1.75 m (5 ft 9 in)
- Position: Full-back

Youth career
- Torrevieja CF

Senior career*
Years	Team	Apps	(Gls)
1978–1983	Castilla	140	(3)
1982	Real Madrid	1	(0)
1983–1985	Cartagena	71	(0)
1985–1986	Celta Vigo	15	(0)
1986–1988	Logroñés	66	(2)
1988–1990	Elche	27	(0)
1990–1991	Torrevieja CF	31	(2)
Total		351	(7)

Managerial career
- 2000: Elche (caretaker)
- 2001–2002: Elche B
- 2003: Elche
- 2003: Yeclano
- 2005–2006: Eldense
- 2007–2008: Novelda
- 2009–2011: Cartagena La Unión
- 2012: FC Torrevieja
- * Club domestic league appearances and goals

Casimiro Torres Ibáñez (born 18 June 1959), sometimes known simply as Casimiro while a player, is a Spanish former football player and manager.

A full-back, he played 61 La Liga games for Real Madrid, Celta Vigo, Logroñés and Elche. In the Segunda División, he played 259 matches and scored 5 goals, for Castilla, Cartagena, Logroñés and Elche.

As a manager, Torres had two brief spells in charge of Elche in the second tier in the early 2000s.

== Playing career ==
Born in Torrevieja in the Province of Alicante, Torres began his career as a youth at his hometown club Torrevieja CF, before joining Real Madrid. He began his senior career with the reserve team, Castilla, in the Segunda División. He was part of the side that reached the final of the Copa del Rey in 1979–80, losing 6–1 to their parent club on 4 June.

As Real Madrid won La Liga as well as the cup, the reserves took part in the 1980–81 edition of the UEFA Cup Winners' Cup, with Torres playing both legs of their 6–4 elimination by England's West Ham United in the first round. He made his only first-team appearance on 11 April 1982, as Castilla filled in during a professionals' strike and won 2–1 away to CD Castellón.

In June 1983, Torres signed for fellow second-tier team Cartagena FC for the upcoming season. Two years later, he moved on a three-season contract to RC Celta de Vigo, as their first acquisition ahead of their return to La Liga.

After Celta's relegation, Torres signed for CD Logroñés in the second division in June 1986. He played 35 games and scored twice as the team from La Rioja reached the top flight for the first time. When his contract expired in June 1988, he moved to Elche CF of his home province, who had sought his signature when he left Cartagena.

== Managerial career ==
After the dismissal of Tolo Plaza, Elche hired Torres as a temporary replacement in January 2000. He drew both of his games, at home to UD Salamanca and away to Albacete Balompié, before Jorge D'Alessandro was appointed.

In late May 2003, Torres returned to the dugout at the Estadio Martínez Valero when Julián Rubio was sacked with five games remaining and the team three points above relegation. His team confirmed their survival before the final game, away to UD Las Palmas.

Torres was hired at CD Eldense in the Tercera División in 2005. He achieved promotion in his first season, after a playoff final win over Girona FC. In July 2007 he was hired at Novelda CF, also in the fourth tier.

In 2009, Torres was hired as manager of FC Cartagena-La Unión, the new farm team of FC Cartagena in the Tercera División. He combined this job with a role as a sports coordinator for Torrevieja's city council. In June 2011 the team was dissolved; he said he then found it difficult to find a new club.

Torres then joined his hometown's new club FC Torrevieja as an assistant. He was briefly the manager before being dismissed at the end of 2012; his team were in 14th and four points from relegation at the halfway break in the season.
