= Miguel Bernal (footballer) =

Spanish footballer (born 1958)

Personal information
- Full name: Miguel Bernal Feito
- Date of birth: 11 May 1958 (age 68)
- Place of birth: Madrid, Sapin
- Height: 1.85 m (6 ft 1 in)
- Position: Midfielder

Senior career*
Years	Team	Apps	(Gls)
1976–1981	Castilla	145	(36)
1981–1985	Racing Santander	113	(18)
1985–1988	Mallorca	103	(3)
1988–1990	Salamanca	53	(1)
Total		414	(58)
- * Club domestic league appearances and goals

Miguel Bernal Feito (born 11 May 1958) is a Spanish former footballer who played as a midfielder.

He played 145 games in La Liga and scored 10 goals for Racing Santander and Mallorca. In the Segunda División, he recorded 228 games and 27 goals for Castilla, Racing, Mallorca and Salamanca, achieving promotions with the middle two teams.

== Career ==
Born in Madrid, Bernal began his senior career at Real Madrid's reserve team, Real Madrid Castilla, who achieved consecutive promotions from the Tercera División to the Segunda División in the late 1970s. In 1979–80, the team reached the Copa del Rey final, with Bernal scoring in a 4–1 win at AD Alcorcón in the second round; the side lost 6–1 to their parent club in the final on 4 June.

As Real Madrid had won La Liga and qualified for the European Cup, Castilla entered the UEFA Cup Winners' Cup as Spain's representatives, and were drawn against England's West Ham United in the first round. Bernal scored a consolation goal as they lost 5–1 at the Boleyn Ground in the second leg, being eliminated 6–4 on aggregate after extra time; playing as captain, he scored a direct free kick from 35 yards.

In July 1981, Bernal was loaned to Racing de Santander in the top flight. There were over a month of negotiations, as he requested a salary of 3 million Spanish pesetas but settled for 2 million. He scored six times in his first La Liga season, starting on 5 October with the first goal of a 3–1 home win over UD Las Palmas. The team were relegated in his second season, returning immediately with promotion from the 1983–84 Segunda División.

Bernal moved to RCD Mallorca in the second tier in July 1985. He was one of several veterans signed for the season, which ended with promotion. His spell in the Balearic Islands ended in June 1988 as the club lost a promotion/relegation playoff to Real Oviedo.

When Bernal's contract expired, he was linked to Elche CF. In July 1988, he signed a two-year deal at UD Salamanca in the Segunda División, for an undisclosed fee.
