= Álvaro Leiva =

Spanish footballer (born 2004)

Personal information
- Full name: Álvaro Leiva Alemany
- Date of birth: 28 December 2004 (age 21)
- Place of birth: Algeciras, Spain
- Height: 1.73 m (5 ft 8 in)
- Positions: Winger; forward

Team information
- Current team: Real Madrid B
- Number: 11

Youth career
- 2017–2021: Algeciras

Senior career*
Years	Team	Apps	(Gls)
2021–2022	Algeciras	37	(4)
2022–	Real Madrid B	20	(0)
2023	→ Osasuna B (loan)	6	(0)
2024	→ Córdoba (loan)	14	(0)
2024–2025	→ Algeciras (loan)	26	(4)
2025–2026	Real Madrid C	27	(5)
2026–	Real Madrid	1	(0)

International career^{‡}
2022	Spain U18	1	(0)
2022	Spain U19	1	(0)
- * Club domestic league appearances and goals as of 17 May 2026 ‡ National team caps and goals as of 31 August 2022

Álvaro Leiva Alemany (born 15 March 2004) is a Spanish footballer who plays as a winger or forward for Real Madrid C.

== Early life ==
Leiva was born on 15 March 2004. Born in Algeciras, Spain, he is a native of the city.

== Club career ==
As a youth player, Leiva joined the youth academy of Algeciras and was promoted to the club's senior team ahead of the 2021–22 season, where he made thirty-seven league appearances and scored four goals. Following his stint there, he signed for Real Madrid in 2022.

One year later, he was sent on loan to Osasuna B, where he made six league appearances and scored zero goals, before being sent on loan to Córdoba, where he made fourteen league appearances and scored zero goals. During the summer of 2023, he returned on loan to Algeciras, where he made twenty-six league appearances and scored four goals.

== International career ==
Leiva is a Spain youth international. On 1 September 2022, he debuted for the Spain national under-19 football team during a 2–0 home friendly win over the Israel national under-19 football team.

== Style of play ==
Leiva plays as a winger or forward. Spanish news website Relevo wrote in 2024 that he is an "electrifying right-footed player, with his dazzling one-on-one ability and sensational footwork for crossing and striking".
