= Miguel Montes (footballer, born 1940) =

Spanish footballer and manager (1940–2019)

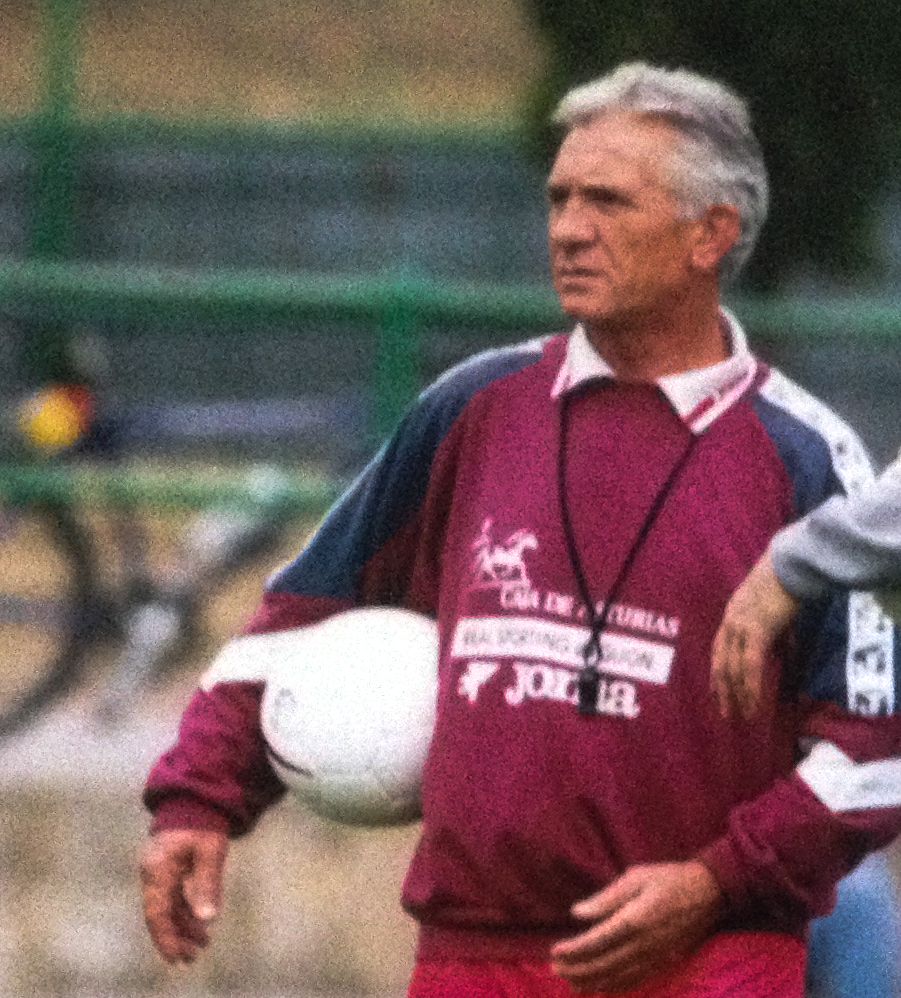

Personal information
- Full name: Miguel Ángel Montes Busto
- Date of birth: 28 February 1940
- Place of birth: Oviedo, Asturias, Spain
- Date of death: 20 May 2019 (aged 79)
- Place of death: Gijón, Asturias, Spain
- Position: Forward

Senior career*
| Years | Team | Apps | (Gls) |
| 1959–1969 | Real Gijón | 218 | (55) |
| 1961–1962 | → Las Palmas (loan) | 2 | (0) |
| 1969–1971 | Oviedo | 46 | (10) |
| Total | | 266 | (65) |

Managerial career
- 1972–1974: Gijón Industrial
- 1974–1975: Real Avilés
- 1975–1977: Langreo
- 1977–1980: Zamora
- 1980–1982: Palencia
- 1982–1983: Cultural Leonesa
- 1983–1984: Arosa
- 1984–1985: Sporting Atlético
- 1993: Zamora
- 1993–1994: Langreo
- 1995–1996: Sporting B
- 1996–1997: Sporting Gijón
- * Club domestic league appearances and goals

Miguel Ángel Montes Busto (28 February 1940 – 20 May 2019) was a Spanish professional football player and manager.

Born in Oviedo, Asturias, Montes Busto played as a forward and spent twelve seasons in the Segunda División between 1959 and 1971. He played for Real Gijón, Las Palmas and Real Oviedo. After retiring from playing, he managed Segunda División side Palencia, several Segunda División B clubs and Sporting de Gijón in La Liga.

Montes Busto died on 20 May 2019 in Gijón, Asturias, at the age of 79.
