= Benigno Chaparro =

Paraguayan footballer (born 1958)

Personal information
- Full name: Benigno Chaparro Vera
- Date of birth: 3 April 1958 (age 68)
- Place of birth: Itauguá, Paraguay
- Position: Striker

Senior career*
Years	Team	Apps	(Gls)
1978–1979	UD Salamanca	12	(0)
1979–1981	Palencia CF	56	(6)
1982–1985	Racing de Santander	56	(5)
- Deportivo Alavés
1990–1991	Orihuela Deportiva	26	(0)
1992–1994	CA Marbella	59	(4)
1995–1996	CA Marbella	12	(0)
- * Club domestic league appearances and goals

Benigno Chaparro Vera (born 3 April 1958) is a Paraguayan retired professional footballer who played for a number of clubs in Spain, including UD Salamanca, Palencia CF, Racing de Santander, Deportivo Alavés, Orihuela Deportiva and CA Marbella.
