= Javier Castañeda =

Spanish footballer

Personal information
- Full name: Javier Castañeda López
- Date of birth: 5 October 1955 (age 71)
- Place of birth: Madrid, Spain
- Height: 1.81 m (5 ft 11 1/2 in)
- Position: Defender

Youth career
- Real Madrid

Senior career*
Years	Team	Apps	(Gls)
1974–1980	Real Madrid B	168	(0)
1980–1991	Osasuna	349	(1)
Total		517	(1)
- * Club domestic league appearances and goals

Javier Castañeda López (born 5 October 1955) is a Spanish former professional footballer who played as a defender.

== Club career ==
Born in Madrid, Castañeda spent six years with Real Madrid's reserves, the last two in the Segunda División. In the summer of 1980, he moved into La Liga and joined CA Osasuna, making his debut in the competition on 7 September in a 1–0 home win against UD Las Palmas and finishing his first season with 27 appearances as they finished in 11th position.

In the following ten seasons, Castañeda rarely missed a game for the Navarrese, going on to play a club-record 349 in the top division (341 as a starter, 30,090 minutes of action). He retired in June 1991 at the age of 35, having also appeared in four complete matches in the 1985–86 UEFA Cup with his main team.
