= 1979–80 Copa del Rey =

78th Copa del Rey

Tournament details
- Country: Spain
- Dates: 11 September 1979 – 4 June 1980
- Teams: 226

Final positions
- Champions: Real Madrid CF (14th title)
- Runners-up: Castilla CF

Tournament statistics
- Matches played: 449
- Goals scored: 1,320 (2.94 per match)

The 1979–80 Copa del Rey was the 78th staging of the Spanish Cup, the annual domestic cup competition in the Spanish football. The tournament was attended by 226 teams from the main categories of Spanish football.

The tournament began on 11 September 1979 and ended on 4 June 1980 with the final, held in Santiago Bernabéu Stadium in Madrid.

The final was an unusual event as Real Madrid CF faced their reserve team Castilla CF. The final score was 6–1 with Real Madrid getting their fourteenth title. This win added to the league title gave the double (third in their history) and Castilla CF qualified directly for the next edition of the UEFA Cup Winners' Cup.

The revelation of the tournament Castilla CF, became the third team from the second division to reach the final.

The defending champions, Valencia CF, were defeated 3–2 (on aggregate score) by Sporting de Gijón in the round of 16.

== Format ==
Schedule
Round	Fixture	Clubs	Gain entry
First round	110	226 → 116	All Clubs participating gain entry
Second round	56	116 → 60	Real Sociedad, Sporting de Gijón, Atlético de Madrid (*)
Third round	28	60 → 32	
Fourth round	14	32 → 18	
Fifth round	2	18 → 16	
Round of 16	8	16 → 8	FC Barcelona, Real Madrid CF, Valencia CF (*)
Quarter-finals	4	8 → 4	
Semi-finals	2	4 → 2	
Final	1	2 → 1	

Teams
Division	No. clubs
1ª División	18
2ª División	20
2ª División B	39
3ª División	148
Cto. Nacional de Aficionados	1
Total teams	226

- All rounds are played over two legs except the final which is played a single match in a neutral venue. The team that has the higher aggregate score over the two legs progresses to the next round.
- In case of a tie on aggregate, will play an extra time of 30 minutes, and if still tied, will be decided with a penalty shoot-outs.
- The teams that play European competitions are exempt until the round of 16 or when they are removed from the tournament.
- The winners of the competition will earn a place in the group stage of next season's UEFA Cup Winners' Cup, if they have not already qualified for European competition, if so then the runners-up will instead take this berth.

(*) Teams playing European competition.

== First round ==
First round
Home 1st leg	Agg.	Home 2nd leg	1st leg			2nd leg			Notes
Atlético Valdemoro	6–1	CD Díter Zafra	12 Sep 1979	5–0		31 Oct 1979	2–1		
AD Alcorcón	4–3	CD Ciempozuelos	12 Sep 1979	4–1		31 Oct 1979	2–0		
CD Toledo	2–1	CD Leganés	12 Sep 1979	0–0		31 Oct 1979	1–2		
AD Arganda	3–4	CD Carabanchel	12 Sep 1979	2–1		31 Oct 1979	3–1		
Real Jaén CF	1–3	Linares CF	12 Sep 1979	0–2	Rep.	31 Oct 1979	1–1		
CD Mestalla	4–6	UD Español	12 Sep 1979	2–5		25 Oct 1979	1–2		
CD Valdepeñas	2–3	CD Badajoz	12 Sep 1979	2–2		31 Oct 1979	1–0		
CD San Fernando	2–2 (p)	AD Ceuta	12 Sep 1979	2–0		31 Oct 1979	2–0		Penalties: 6–5 for AD Ceuta.
UD Vall de Uxó	2–3	Vinaròs CF	12 Sep 1979	1–1	Rep.	31 Oct 1979	2–1	Rep.	
Arenas de Getxo	2–5	Barakaldo CF	12 Sep 1979	2–2		3 Oct 1979	3–0		
Castro FC	2–4	UP Langreo	12 Sep 1979	2–0		11 Oct 1979	3–0		
Sestao SC	1–2	CD Getxo	12 Sep 1979	1–0		19 Sep 1979	2–0		
Bilbao Athletic	7–3	Balmaseda FC	12 Sep 1979	5–3		10 Oct 1979	0–2		
CF Villanovense	2–1	Mérida Industrial CF	12 Sep 1979	1–0		31 Oct 1979	1–1		
CD Plasencia	2–3	CP Cacereño	12 Sep 1979	1–0		31 Oct 1979	3–1		
SD Ponferradina	2–4	Racing de Ferrol	12 Sep 1979	1–2		31 Oct 1979	2–1		
UE Lleida	2–2 (p)	CD Europa	12 Sep 1979	1–1	Rep.	30 Oct 1979	1–1	Rep.	Penalties: 4–5 for UE Lleida.
CD Logroñés	7–2	Atlético Monzón	12 Sep 1979	4–0		24 Oct 1979	2–3	Rep.	
CD Eldense	2–2 (p)	UD Carcaixent	12 Sep 1979	1–1		10 Oct 1979	1–1		Penalties: 3–2 for UD Carcaixent.
Toscal CF	2–3	SD Tenisca	12 Sep 1979	2–1		31 Oct 1979	2–0		
CD Rota	1–2	Calvo Sotelo CF	12 Sep 1979	0–1		31 Oct 1979	1–1		
Pontevedra CF	7–2	Gran Peña Celtista	12 Sep 1979	5–0		17 Oct 1979	2–2		
CD La Cava	3–4	Terrassa FC	12 Sep 1979	2–2	Rep.	31 Oct 1979	2–1	Rep.	
Arousa SC	1–2	CD Ourense	12 Sep 1979	1–0		31 Oct 1979	2–0		
CD Béjar Industrial	1–5	Cultural Leonesa	12 Sep 1979	0–1		4 Oct 1979	4–1	Rep.	
CD Mirandés	5–4	SD Huesca	12 Sep 1979	4–1		31 Oct 1979	3–1		
SD Ibiza	2–1	CD Felanitx	12 Sep 1979	1–0		31 Oct 1979	1–1		
Puerto Real CF	1–3	Sevilla Atlético	12 Sep 1979	1–1		31 Oct 1979	2–0	Rep.	
UD Olot	2–1	CF Igualada	12 Sep 1979	2–0	Rep.	31 Oct 1979	1–0	Rep.	
FC Andorra	3–4	CD Masnou	12 Sep 1979	2–3	Rep.	31 Oct 1979	1–1	Rep.	
CF Badalona	7–4	CF Gavà	12 Sep 1979	3–1	Rep.	31 Oct 1979	3–4	Rep.	
SD Formentera	3–2	UD Porreras	12 Sep 1979	2–2		31 Oct 1979	0–1		
CD Constància	4–2	Ibiza Atlético	12 Sep 1979	3–2		1 Nov 1979	0–1		
CD Murense	3–3 (p)	CD España	12 Sep 1979	2–1		31 Oct 1979	2–1		Penalties: x–x for CD España.
UE Figueres	9–4	UDA Gramenet	12 Sep 1979	6–0	Rep.	31 Oct 1979	4–3	Rep.	
UD Collerense	1–4	UD Poblense	12 Sep 1979	0–0		24 Oct 1979	4–1		
CF Sporting Mahonés	1–2	Atlético Ciudadela	12 Sep 1979	1–0		1 Nov 1979	2–0		
CD Andratx	3–2	CF Sóller	12 Sep 1979	2–1		12 Oct 1979	1–1		
RCD Mallorca	1–0	CD Margaritense	12 Sep 1979	0–0		1 Nov 1979	0–1		
CF Reus Deportiu	4–5	FC Vilafranca	12 Sep 1979	3–2	Rep.	31 Oct 1979	3–1	Rep.	
Girona FC	2–5	FC Barcelona Atlètic	12 Sep 1979	0–4	Rep.	31 Oct 1979	1–2	Rep.	
Fabril Deportivo	1–2	Juventud Cambados	12 Sep 1979	1–0		1 Nov 1979	2–0		
UD Gijón Industrial	1–2	Santoña CF	12 Sep 1979	1–1		31 Oct 1979	1–0		
CD Naval	0–1	Gimnástica de Torrelavega	12 Sep 1979	0–0		31 Oct 1979	1–0		
CD San Martín	2–7	Caudal Deportivo	12 Sep 1979	0–2		31 Oct 1979	5–2		
Real Oviedo Aficionados	2–3	CD Turón	12 Sep 1979	2–2		1 Nov 1979	1–0		
CD Mungia	1–0	SD Gernika	12 Sep 1979	0–0		25 Oct 1979	0–1		
Alavés Aficionados	3–4	SD Erandio	12 Sep 1979	1–0		25 Oct 1979	4–2		
SD Deusto	2–4	CD Aurrerá	12 Sep 1979	2–1		25 Oct 1979	3–0		
SD Lemona	1–5	Tolosa CF	12 Sep 1979	1–1		25 Oct 1979	4–0		
CD Calahorra	10–5	AD Sabiñánigo	12 Sep 1979	8–2		11 Oct 1979	3–2		
CF Lorca Deportiva	3–3 (p)	UD Alzira	12 Sep 1979	3–0		31 Oct 1979	3–0		Penalties: x–x for UD Alzira.
CD Olímpic de Xàtiva	3–2	CD Villena	12 Sep 1979	3–1		31 Oct 1979	1–0		
Crevillente CF	3–3 (p)	UD Puçol	12 Sep 1979	2–1		27 Sep 1979	2–1		Penalties: 2–4 for Crevillente CF.
AP Almansa	1–2	Villarreal CF	12 Sep 1979	1–1		31 Oct 1979	1–0		
CF Gandía	1–1 (p)	Torrevieja CF	12 Sep 1979	0–0		31 Oct 1979	1–1		Penalties: x–x for Torrevieja CF.
Orihuela Deportiva CF	5–0	CD Acero	12 Sep 1979	5–0		31 Oct 1979	0–0		
Gimnástica Arandina	0–1	Real Valladolid Promesas	12 Sep 1979	0–0		24 Oct 1979	1–0		
CD Antequerano	2–1	Úbeda CF	12 Sep 1979	1–0		1 Nov 1979	1–1		
Atlético Malagueño	2–1	Vélez CF	12 Sep 1979	2–0		31 Oct 1979	1–0		
CD Martos	4–2	CD Estepona	12 Sep 1979	2–0		1 Nov 1979	2–2		
CD Ses Salines	3–5	SD Portmany	12 Sep 1979	3–2		31 Oct 1979	3–0		
Haro Deportivo	1–4	UDC Chantrea	13 Sep 1979	1–2		31 Oct 1979	2–0		
Betis Deportivo	0–2	Racing Portuense	13 Sep 1979	0–0	Rep.	24 Oct 1979	2–0		
Real Avilés CF	5–4	UD Cacabelense	19 Sep 1979	3–1		17 Oct 1979	3–2		
CD San Andrés	1–11	UD Las Palmas	19 Sep 1979	0–6	Rep.	31 Oct 1979	5–1	Rep.	
Getafe Deportivo	11–1	CD Numancia	19 Sep 1979	6–0		11 Oct 1979	1–5		
Real Unión	0–4	Deportivo Alavés	19 Sep 1979	0–0		31 Oct 1979	4–0		
Deportivo Aragón	2–3	CD Binéfar	19 Sep 1979	1–1		31 Oct 1979	2–1		
UD Las Palmas Atlético	2–9	CD Tenerife	19 Sep 1979	2–4		17 Oct 1979	5–0		
AD Llerenense	0–5	CD Pegaso	27 Sep 1979	0–1		12 Oct 1979	4–0		
Gimnàstic de Tarragona	3–1	CE Júpiter	3 Oct 1979	1–0	Rep.	31 Oct 1979	1–2	Rep.	
CD Lugo	0–1	Club Turista	5 Oct 1979	0–0		31 Oct 1979	1–0		
SD Ejea	2–5	CD Peña Sport	11 Oct 1979	0–1		25 Oct 1979	4–2		
CD San Fernando de Henares	3–4	CD Don Benito	11 Oct 1979	3–1		31 Oct 1979	3–0		
Ontinyent CF	1–3	Albacete Balompié	11 Oct 1979	1–0	Rep.	31 Oct 1979	3–0		
Atlético Baleares	7–4	CD Binissalem	12 Oct 1979	5–1		1 Nov 1979	3–2		
Noya SD	1–4	SD Compostela	11 Sep 1979	0–3	Rep.	31 Oct 1979	1–1		
CD Sangüesa	1–3	CD Corellano	11 Sep 1979	0–0	Rep.	31 Oct 1979	3–1		
UD Carolinense	4–2	CF Industrial Melilla	11 Sep 1979	2–0	Rep.	30 Oct 1979	2–2		
CD Manchego	5–6	Rayo Vallecano	12 Sep 1979	2–2	Rep.	31 Oct 1979	4–3	Rep.	
SD Eibar	3–10	Athletic Bilbao	12 Sep 1979	2–5	Rep.	31 Oct 1979	5–1	Rep.	
Endesa Andorra	0–3	Real Zaragoza	12 Sep 1979	0–1	Rep.	31 Oct 1979	2–0	Rep.	
CD Malgrat	0–4	RCD Espanyol	12 Sep 1979	0–0	Rep.	31 Oct 1979	4–0	Rep.	
Hércules CF	3–1	CD Alcoyano	12 Sep 1979	1–0	Rep.	31 Oct 1979	1–2	Rep.	
Burgos CF	6–0	CD Venta de Baños	12 Sep 1979	3–0	Rep.	24 Oct 1979	0–3	Rep.	
Benavente CF	0–8	UD Salamanca	12 Sep 1979	0–5	Rep.	17 Oct 1979	3–0	Rep.	
Jerez Industrial CF	3-8	Real Betis	12 Sep 1979	2–5	Rep.	31 Oct 1979	3–0	Rep.	
CF Extremadura	2–10	Castilla CF	12 Sep 1979	1–4		31 Oct 1979	6–1		
Sevilla FC	6–6 (p)	Xerez CD	12 Sep 1979	1–3	Rep.	31 Oct 1979	3–5	Rep.	Penalties: 4–5 for Sevilla FC.
Gimnástico Melilla CF	1–4	CD Málaga	12 Sep 1979	0–0	Rep.	31 Oct 1979	4–1	Rep.	
CD Motril	1–2	AD Almería	12 Sep 1979	0–1		31 Oct 1979	1–1	Rep.	
Atlético Ribeira	1–5	Deportivo de La Coruña	12 Sep 1979	1–2		31 Oct 1979	3–0		
Racing de Santander	4–3	Sporting Atlético	12 Sep 1979	2–1	Rep.	31 Oct 1979	2–2		
CD Ensidesa	0–5	Real Oviedo CF	12 Sep 1979	0–1		31 Oct 1979	4–0		
RSD Alcalá	3–5	AD Torrejón	12 Sep 1979	2–2		31 Oct 1979	3–1		
CA Osasuna	5–0	CD Tudelano	12 Sep 1979	3–0		1 Nov 1979	0–2		
Celta de Vigo	7–1	Alondras CF	12 Sep 1979	6–0	Rep.	1 Nov 1979	1–1		
Paterna CF	0–2	Levante UD	12 Sep 1979	0–2		31 Oct 1979	0–0		
CE Sabadell FC	3–2 (aet)	UE Sant Andreu	12 Sep 1979	2–1	Rep.	31 Oct 1979	1–1	Rep.	
Real Murcia CF	9–3	Alicante CF	12 Sep 1979	6–1		30 Oct 1979	2–3		
UD Quart	0–5	Elche CF	12 Sep 1979	0–2		31 Oct 1979	3–0		
CD Castellón	4–3	Cartagena CF	12 Sep 1979	3–1	Rep.	31 Oct 1979	2–1		
CD Colonia Moscardó	5–1	CD Talavera	12 Sep 1979	2–1		31 Oct 1979	0–3		
Cádiz CF	3–3 (p)	Real Balompédica Linense	12 Sep 1979	3–1	Rep.	31 Oct 1979	2–0		Penalties: 4–5 for Cádiz CF.
Zamora CF	2–2 (p)	Palencia CF	12 Sep 1979	1–1		31 Oct 1979	1–1		Penalties: 5–3 for Palencia CF.
Córdoba CF	3–2	Granada CF	12 Sep 1979	2–1	Rep.	31 Oct 1979	1–1		
Real Valladolid Deportivo	8–3	Burgos Promesas CF	12 Sep 1979	7–2	Rep.	31 Oct 1979	1–1		
UD San Pedro	0–5	Algeciras CF	12 Sep 1979	0–3		31 Oct 1979	2–0		
SD Unión África Ceutí	1–9	Recreativo de Huelva	12 Sep 1979	1–1	Rep.	7 Nov 1979	8–0	Rep.	
Bye: Atlético de Madrid, FC Barcelona, Real Madrid CF, Real Sociedad, Sporting de Gijón, Valencia CF.
Results of matches played: 12 September / 19 September / 3 October / 5 October / 10 October / 11 October / 17 October / 24 October / 25 October / 30 October / 31 October / 1 November

== Second round ==
Second round
Home 1st leg	Agg.	Home 2nd leg	1st leg			2nd leg			Notes
CD Colonia Moscardó	7–1	SD Tenisca	20 Nov 1979	6–0		8 Dec 1979	1–1		
Castilla CF	5–1	AD Alcorcón	21 Nov 1979	1–0	Rep.	8 Dec 1979	1–4		
Bilbao Athletic	1–3	Real Sociedad	21 Nov 1979	0–1	Rep.	19 Dec 1979	2–1	Rep.	
CD Masnou	2–8	RCD Espanyol	21 Nov 1979	2–2	Rep.	8 Dec 1979	6–0	Rep.	
Hércules CF	3–1	Crevillente CF	21 Nov 1979	1–0	Rep.	8 Dec 1979	1–2	Rep.	
Cultural Leonesa	1–2	UD Salamanca	21 Nov 1979	1–1	Rep.	19 Dec 1979	2–1	Rep.	
CD Pegaso	5–6	CP Cacereño	21 Nov 1979	3–3		8 Dec 1979	3–2		
Real Betis	4–2	Sevilla Atlético	21 Nov 1979	2–0	Rep.	19 Dec 1979	2–2	Rep.	
Córdoba CF	2–3	Sevilla FC	21 Nov 1979	2–1	Rep.	6 Dec 1979	2–0	Rep.	
CD Martos	0–11	CD Málaga	21 Nov 1979	0–5	Rep.	19 Dec 1979	6–0	Rep.	
AD Almería	3–0	Atlético Malagueño	21 Nov 1979	3–0	Rep.	19 Dec 1979	0–0	Rep.	
UD Las Palmas	4–2	CD Tenerife	21 Nov 1979	2–1	Rep.	19 Dec 1979	1–2	Rep.	
Racing de Ferrol	3–2	Deportivo de La Coruña	21 Nov 1979	3–1		8 Dec 1979	1–0	Rep.	
Celta de Vigo	5–0	CD Ourense	21 Nov 1979	4–0		8 Dec 1979	0–1	Rep.	
Real Oviedo CF	6–0	Santoña CF	21 Nov 1979	6–0		8 Dec 1979	0–0		
Caudal Deportivo	2–5	Racing de Santander	21 Nov 1979	2–0		8 Dec 1979	5–0	Rep.	
CE Sabadell FC	4–2	UE Figueres	21 Nov 1979	3–0	Rep.	19 Dec 1979	2–1	Rep.	
Albacete Balompié	0–1	Real Murcia CF	21 Nov 1979	0–0		8 Dec 1979	1–0	Rep.	
UD Español	2–6	CD Castellón	21 Nov 1979	2–3	Rep.	19 Dec 1979	3–0	Rep.	
Orihuela Deportiva CF	0–6	Levante UD	21 Nov 1979	0–4	Rep.	8 Dec 1979	2–0	Rep.	
Elche CF	4–1	CD Olímpic de Xàtiva	21 Nov 1979	3–0	Rep.	19 Dec 1979	1–1	Rep.	
Palencia CF	6–2	Real Valladolid Promesas	21 Nov 1979	4–0		19 Dec 1979	3–2		
Linares CF	1–4	Recreativo de Huelva	21 Nov 1979	1–0		9 Dec 1979	3–1	Rep.	
AD Ceuta	1–2	Cádiz CF	21 Nov 1979	0–1	Rep.	8 Dec 1979	0–2	Rep.	
CD Antequerano	2–3	Algeciras CF	21 Nov 1979	2–1		19 Dec 1979	2–0		
Pontevedra CF	3–1	Juventud Cambados	21 Nov 1979	1–1		19 Dec 1979	0–2		
CD Binéfar	3–4	CD Logroñés	21 Nov 1979	1–0		19 Dec 1979	4–2		
Terrassa FC	4–2	UD Carcaixent	21 Nov 1979	1–0	Rep.	19 Dec 1979	2–3	Rep.	
CD Toledo	1–5	AD Torrejón	21 Nov 1979	0–0		19 Dec 1979	5–1		
CD Badajoz	2–1	Calvo Sotelo CF	21 Nov 1979	2–0		19 Dec 1979	1–0		
SD Compostela	3–1	Club Turista	21 Nov 1979	2–1		8 Dec 1979	0–1		
CD Mungia	3–2	Tolosa CF	21 Nov 1979	3–1		8 Dec 1979	1–0		
Torrevieja CF	4–5	Villarreal CF	21 Nov 1979	4–1		19 Dec 1979	4–0	Rep.	
UD Alzira	4–0	Vinaròs CF	21 Nov 1979	3–0		8 Dec 1979	0–1		
Atlético Baleares	2–0	SD Formentera	21 Nov 1979	1–0		19 Dec 1979	0–1		
CD Constància	2–3 (aet)	RCD Mallorca	22 Nov 1979	1–1		8 Dec 1979	2–1	Rep.	
CD Carabanchel	2–3	Real Valladolid Deportivo	28 Nov 1979	1–0	Rep.	8 Dec 1979	3–1	Rep.	
CD Don Benito	2–3	Rayo Vallecano	28 Nov 1979	0–2	Rep.	8 Dec 1979	1–2	Rep.	
CD Turón	0–6	Sporting de Gijón	28 Nov 1979	0–4	Rep.	19 Dec 1979	2–0	Rep.	
CD Getxo	1–12	Athletic Bilbao	8 Dec 1979	0–5	Rep.	12 Dec 1979	7–1	Rep.	
Barakaldo CF	2–3	Burgos CF	8 Dec 1979	1–1	Rep.	26 Dec 1979	2–1	Rep.	Match scheduled for 20 Dec, but played on 26 Dec due to snow.
CD Calahorra	3–6	Real Zaragoza	8 Dec 1979	1–2	Rep.	19 Dec 1979	4–2	Rep.	
Atlético Valdemoro	1–3	Atlético de Madrid	8 Dec 1979	1–3	Rep.	20 Dec 1979	0–0	Rep.	
CD Aurrerá	1–2	Deportivo Alavés	8 Dec 1979	1–0		26 Dec 1979	2–0	Rep.	Match scheduled for 20 Dec, but played on 26 Dec due to snow.
UDC Chantrea	1–5	CA Osasuna	8 Dec 1979	1–0		20 Dec 1979	5–0	Rep.	Match scheduled for 19 Dec, but played the next day due to snow.
Gimnàstic de Tarragona	1–0	FC Barcelona Atlètic	8 Dec 1979	1–0	Rep.	19 Dec 1979	0–0	Rep.	
CF Villanovense	0–11	Getafe Deportivo	8 Dec 1979	0–5		20 Dec 1979	6–0	Rep.	
UP Langreo	3–2	Gimnástica de Torrelavega	8 Dec 1979	2–0		19 Dec 1979	2–1		
CD Mirandés	1–2	CD Peña Sport	8 Dec 1979	1–0		19 Dec 1979	2–0		
CF Badalona	2–5	UE Lleida	8 Dec 1979	2–0	Rep.	19 Dec 1979	5–0	Rep.	
UD Carolinense	0–2	Racing Portuense	8 Dec 1979	0–0		19 Dec 1979	2–0		
SD Ibiza	3–2	CD España	8 Dec 1979	1–0		12 Dec 1979	2–2	Rep.	
Real Avilés CF	3–3 (p)	CD Corellano	8 Dec 1979	2–1		12 Dec 1979	2–1		Penalties: 4–2 for CD Corellano.
UD Olot	3–2	FC Vilafranca	8 Dec 1979	3–0	Rep.	19 Dec 1979	2–0	Rep.	
UD Poblense	3–4	SD Portmany	8 Dec 1979	2–2	Rep.	19 Dec 1979	2–1		
Atlético Ciudadela	7–2	CD Andratx	9 Dec 1979	5–0	Rep.	19 Dec 1979	2–2		
Bye: SD Erandio, FC Barcelona, Real Madrid CF, Valencia CF.
Results of matches played: 21 November / 21 November / 8 December / 12 December / 19 December

== Third round ==
Third round
Home 1st leg	Agg.	Home 2nd leg	1st leg			2nd leg			Notes
Deportivo Alavés	3–0	UE Lleida	9 Jan 1980	2–0	Rep.	16 Jan 1980	0–1	Rep.	
Algeciras CF	1–4	Getafe Deportivo	10 Jan 1980	1–1	Rep.	16 Jan 1980	3–0	Rep.	Match scheduled for Jan 9, but played on Jan 10 due to fog.
UD Alzira	0–3	Recreativo de Huelva	10 Jan 1980	0–1	Rep.	16 Jan 1980	2–0	Rep.	
Real Betis	7–1	Racing de Ferrol	9 Jan 1980	5–1	Rep.	16 Jan 1980	0–2	Rep.	
Castilla CF	3–1	Racing de Santander	9 Jan 1980	3–1	Rep.	16 Jan 1980	0–0	Rep.	
CP Cacereño	4–8	Real Zaragoza	9 Jan 1980	2–4	Rep.	16 Jan 1980	4–2	Rep.	
AD Ceuta	0–2 (aet)	AD Almería	9 Jan 1980	0–0	Rep.	16 Jan 1980	2–0	Rep.	
CD Corellano	2–5	CD Castellón	9 Jan 1980	1–3	Rep.	16 Jan 1980	2–1	Rep.	
Elche CF	5–1	UD Las Palmas	9 Jan 1980	3–1	Rep.	16 Jan 1980	0–2	Rep.	
SD Compostela	3–4	Real Murcia CF	9 Jan 1980	3–0	Rep.	16 Jan 1980	4–0	Rep.	
SD Erandio	1–2	Celta de Vigo	9 Jan 1980	1–2		16 Jan 1980	0–0	Rep.	
RCD Espanyol	6–0	Atlético Ciudadela	9 Jan 1980	3–0	Rep.	17 Jan 1980	0–3	Rep.	
SD Ibiza	0–4	Real Oviedo CF	9 Jan 1980	0–0	Rep.	16 Jan 1980	4–0	Rep.	
CD Logroñés	2–1	Levante UD	9 Jan 1980	0–0		16 Jan 1980	1–2	Rep.	
UP Langreo	0–1	UD Salamanca	9 Jan 1980	0–0	Rep.	16 Jan 1980	1–0	Rep.	
RCD Mallorca	0–1	Palencia CF	9 Jan 1980	0–0	Rep.	16 Jan 1980	1–0	Rep.	
CD Málaga	2–1	Terrassa FC	9 Jan 1980	0–0	Rep.	16 Jan 1980	1–2	Rep.	
CD Colonia Moscardó	2–7	Sporting de Gijón	9 Jan 1980	0–1	Rep.	15 Jan 1980	6–2	Rep.	
CD Mungia	0–13	Athletic Bilbao	9 Jan 1980	0–5	Rep.	16 Jan 1980	8–0	Rep.	
UD Olot	2–5	Burgos CF	9 Jan 1980	2–1	Rep.	16 Jan 1980	4–0	Rep.	
CD Peña Sport	0–3	Real Sociedad	9 Jan 1980	0–1	Rep.	16 Jan 1980	2–0	Rep.	
Racing Portuense	2–7	Atlético de Madrid	9 Jan 1980	1–4	Rep.	16 Jan 1980	3–1	Rep.	
Rayo Vallecano	11–2	SD Portmany	9 Jan 1980	5–0	Rep.	23 Jan 1980	2–6	Rep.	
Pontevedra CF	1–1 (p)	Gimnàstic de Tarragona	9 Jan 1980	1–0	Rep.	16 Jan 1980	1–0	Rep.	Penalties: 4–3 for Gimnàstic de Tarragona.
CE Sabadell FC	9–1	Atlético Baleares	9 Jan 1980	7–1	Rep.	16 Jan 1980	0–2	Rep.	
AD Torrejón	2–4 (aet)	Hércules CF	9 Jan 1980	1–2	Rep.	16 Jan 1980	2–1	Rep.	
Real Valladolid Deportivo	7–1	CD Badajoz	9 Jan 1980	1–0		16 Jan 1980	1–6	Rep.	
Villarreal CF	2–9	Sevilla FC	9 Jan 1980	2–5	Rep.	16 Jan 1980	4–0	Rep.	
Bye: CA Osasuna, FC Barcelona, Real Madrid CF, Valencia CF.
Results of matches played: 9 January

== Fourth round ==
Fourth round
Home 1st leg	Agg.	Home 2nd leg	1st leg			2nd leg			Notes
Burgos CF	1–2	Real Sociedad	30 Jan 1980	1–1	Rep.	6 Feb 1980	1–0	Rep.	
CD Castellón	0–4	AD Almería	30 Jan 1980	0–2	Rep.	6 Feb 1980	2–0	Rep.	
Getafe Deportivo	2–4	Atlético de Madrid	30 Jan 1980	1–2	Rep.	6 Feb 1980	2–1	Rep.	
Gimnàstic de Tarragona	1–2	Deportivo Alavés	30 Jan 1980	0–0	Rep.	6 Feb 1980	2–1	Rep.	
Hércules CF	4–5 (aet)	Castilla CF	30 Jan 1980	4–1	Rep.	6 Feb 1980	4–0	Rep.	
Recreativo de Huelva	0–4	Palencia CF	30 Jan 1980	0–2	Rep.	6 Feb 1980	2–0	Rep.	
CD Logroñés	2–1	UD Salamanca	30 Jan 1980	1–0	Rep.	6 Feb 1980	1–1	Rep.	
CD Málaga	1–2 (aet)	Elche CF	30 Jan 1980	0–0	Rep.	6 Feb 1980	2–1	Rep.	
Real Murcia CF	2–5	CA Osasuna	30 Jan 1980	1–3	Rep.	6 Feb 1980	2–1	Rep.	
Real Oviedo CF	0–4	Celta de Vigo	30 Jan 1980	0–2	Rep.	6 Feb 1980	2–0	Rep.	
Rayo Vallecano	3–0	RCD Espanyol	30 Jan 1980	2–0	Rep.	6 Feb 1980	0–1	Rep.	
Sevilla FC	2–3	Athletic Bilbao	30 Jan 1980	2–1	Rep.	6 Feb 1980	2–0	Rep.	
CE Sabadell FC	2–3	Real Valladolid Deportivo	30 Jan 1980	1–1	Rep.	6 Feb 1980	2–1	Rep.	
Real Zaragoza	1–3	Sporting de Gijón	30 Jan 1980	1–3	Rep.	6 Feb 1980	0–0	Rep.	
Bye: Real Betis, FC Barcelona, Real Madrid CF, Valencia CF.

== Fifth round ==
Fifth round
Home 1st leg	Agg.	Home 2nd leg	1st leg			2nd leg			Notes
Celta de Vigo	4–0	Elche CF	13 Feb 1980	3–0	Rep.	20 Feb 1980	0–1	Rep.	
Palencia CF	1–4	Athletic Bilbao	14 Feb 1980	1–2	Rep.	20 Feb 1980	2–0	Rep.	
Bye: AD Almería, Rayo Vallecano, CA Osasuna, Castilla CF, Atlético de Madrid, Deportivo Alavés, CD Logroñés, Real Betis, Real Sociedad, Sporting de Gijón, Real Valladolid Deportivo, FC Barcelona, Real Madrid CF, Valencia CF.

== Bracket ==
Round of 16
1	Real Valladolid Dptvo. (1–3 p)	1	1	2
16	Deportivo Alavés	0	2	2
8	Celta de Vigo	0	1	1
9	Atlético de Madrid	2	2	4
5	CD Logroñés	2	0	2
12	Real Madrid CF	3	2	5
4	Real Betis	2	3	5
13	AD Almería	1	1	2
6	CA Osasuna	1	0	1
11	Rayo Vallecano	2	1	3
3	Valencia CF	1	1	2
14	Sporting de Gijón	1	2	3
7	FC Barcelona	2	0	2
10	Real Sociedad	1	3	4
2	Castilla CF	0	2	2
15	Athletic Bilbao	0	1	1

Quarter-finals
Real Valladolid Deportivo	1	1	2
Atlético de Madrid	1	2	3
Real Madrid CF	2	1	3
Real Betis	1	1	2
Rayo Vallecano	2	0	2
Sporting de Gijón	3	2	5
Real Sociedad	2	0	2
Castilla CF	1	2	3

Semi-finals
Atlético de Madrid	0	1	1
Real Madrid CF (4–3 p)	0	1	1
Sporting de Gijón	2	1	3
Castilla CF	0	4	4

Final
Real Madrid CF	6
Castilla CF	1

== Round of 16 ==
Team 1	Agg.	Team 2	1st leg	2nd leg
Valladolid	2–2 (3-1 p)	Alavés	1-0	1-2
Celta	1–3	Atlético de Madrid	0-1	1-2
CD Logroñés	2–5	Real Madrid CF	2-3	0-2
Betis	5–2	Almería	2-1	3-1
CA Osasuna	1–3	Rayo Vallecano	1-2	0-1
Valencia	2–3	Sporting de Gijón	1-0	1-3
Barcelona	2–4	Real Sociedad	2-1	0-3
Castilla	2–1	Athletic Bilbao	0-0	2-1

=== First leg ===
27 February 1980	CA Osasuna	1–2	Rayo Vallecano	Pamplona
20:15 CET	Echeverria 40'	Report (in Spanish)	Morena 19'; Solsona 90+2'	Stadium: El Sadar; Attendance: 24,000; Referee: Antonio Borrás del Barrio

27 February 1980	CD Logroñés	2–3	Real Madrid CF	Logroño
20:30 CET	Lotina 11' 23'	Report (in Spanish)	Rincón 5'; Isidro 26'; Cunningham 30'	Stadium: Las Gaunas; Referee: Luis Jaramillo González

27 February 1980	Real Valladolid Deportivo	1–0	Deportivo Alavés	Valladolid
20:30 CET	Santos 12'	Report (in Spanish)		Stadium: José Zorrilla; Referee: José Pablo Montes Espigares

27 February 1980	Celta de Vigo	0–1	Atlético de Madrid	Vigo
20:30 CET		Report (in Spanish)	Rubio 40'	Stadium: Balaídos; Referee: Felipe Crespo Aurré

27 February 1980	FC Barcelona	2–1	Real Sociedad	Barcelona
20:45 CET	Migueli 5'; Landáburu 21'	Report (in Spanish)	López Ufarte 6'	Stadium: Camp Nou; Referee: José Donato Pes Pérez

27 February 1980	Castilla CF	0–0	Athletic Bilbao	Madrid
20:45 CET		Report (in Spanish)		Stadium: Santiago Bernabéu; Attendance: 47,500; Referee: Victoriano Sánchez Arminio

27 February 1980	Valencia CF	1–0	Sporting de Gijón	Valencia
21:00 CET	Kempes 20' (pen.)	Report (in Spanish)		Stadium: Luís Casanova; Referee: Antonio Tomeu Palanqués

27 February 1980	Real Betis	2–1	AD Almería	Sevilla
21:00 CET	Alabanda 55'; Vital 63'	Report (in Spanish)	Rolón 33' (pen.)	Stadium: Benito Villamarín; Attendance: 9,000; Referee: Emilio Soriano Aladrén

=== Second leg ===
11 March 1980	Real Madrid CF	2–0	CD Logroñés	Madrid
20:45 CET	Santillana 13'; Juanito 43'	Report (in Spanish)		Stadium: Santiago Bernabéu; Referee: José María Miguel Pérez

12 March 1980	Athletic Bilbao	1–2	Castilla	Bilbao
20:00 CET	Dani 90'	Report (in Spanish)	Pineda 56'; Balín 84'	Stadium: San Mamés; Referee: Juan Senén Acebal Pezón

12 March 1980	Real Sociedad	3–0	FC Barcelona	San Sebastián
20:00 CET	Diego 24'; Cortabarría 39' (pen.); Idígoras 87'	Report (in Spanish)		Stadium: Atotxa; Attendance: 35,000; Referee: Augusto Lamo Castillo

12 March 1980	Sporting de Gijón	3–1	Valencia CF	Gijón
20:15 CET	Higinio 14' (o.g.); Mesa 47'; Ferrero 56'	Report (in Spanish)	Kempes 25'	Stadium: El Molinón; Referee: José Emilio Guruceta Muro

12 March 1980	Deportivo Alavés	2–1 (a.e.t.) (1–3 p)	Real Valladolid Deportivo	Vitoria-Gasteiz
20:30 CET	Sánchez Martín 34'; Carmelo 106'; Salamanca (yellow card) 93' (red card)	Report (in Spanish)	Rusky 93'	Stadium: Mendizorroza; Referee: Francesc Casajuana Rifà

12 March 1980	Rayo Vallecano	1–0	CA Osasuna	Madrid
20:30 CET	Clares 83'	Report (in Spanish)		Stadium: Nuevo Estadio de Vallecas; Referee: José Gallardo Fernández

12 March 1980	Atlético de Madrid	2–1	Celta de Vigo	Madrid
20:30 CET	Cano 19'; Dirceu 21'	Report (in Spanish)	Senra 3'	Stadium: Vicente Calderón; Attendance: 22,000; Referee: Ildefonso Urizar Azpitarte

12 March 1980	AD Almería	1–3	Real Betis	Almería
21:00 CET	Óscar López 25'	Report (in Spanish)	Alabanda 40'; Benítez 64'; Morán 67'	Stadium: Antonio Franco Navarro; Attendance: 13,000; Referee: José Luis García Carrión

== Quarter-finals ==
Team 1	Agg.	Team 2	1st leg	2nd leg
Valladolid	2–3	Atlético de Madrid	1-1	1-2
Real Madrid	3–2	Betis	2-1	1-1
Rayo Vallecano	2–5	Sporting de Gijón	2-3	0-2
Real Sociedad	2–3	Castilla	2-1	0-2

=== First leg ===
1 April 1980	Rayo Vallecano	2–3	Sporting de Gijón	Madrid
	Morena 34' (pen.), 64'	Report (in Spanish)	Quini 46', 57'; Jiménez 82'	Stadium: Nuevo Estadio de Vallecas; Referee: Victoriano Sánchez Arminio

2 April 1980	Real Sociedad	2–1	Castilla	San Sebastián
20:00 CET	Satrústegui 75'; Diego 80'	Report (in Spanish)	Sánchez Lorenzo 74'	Stadium: Atotxa; Referee: Manuel Álvarez Margüenda

15 April 1980	Real Madrid CF	2–1	Real Betis	Madrid
20:45 CET	Rincón 67', 69'	Report (in Spanish)	Morán 26'	Stadium: Santiago Bernabéu; Attendance: 60,000; Referee: José Manuel Carreira Abad

2 April 1980	Real Valladolid	1–1	Atlético de Madrid	Valladolid
20:45 CET	Gail 28' (pen.)	Report (in Spanish)	Cano 90'	Stadium: José Zorrilla; Referee: Juan Senén Acebal Pezón

=== Second leg ===
30 April 1980	Sporting de Gijón	2–0	Rayo Vallecano	Gijón
20:15 CET	Ferrero 35'; Rezza 76'	Report (in Spanish)		Stadium: El Molinón; Referee: Luis Jaramillo González

30 April 1980	Atlético de Madrid	2–1	Real Valladolid	Madrid
20:30 CET	Rubio 30'; Quique Ramos 75'	Report (in Spanish)	Morera 80'	Stadium: Vicente Calderón; Attendance: 24,000; Referee: José Luis García Carrión

1 May 1980	Castilla CF	2–0	Real Sociedad	Madrid
17:30 CET	Paco 16'; Sánchez Lorenzo 44'	Report (in Spanish)		Stadium: Santiago Bernabéu; Attendance: 100,000; Referee: Joaquín Ramos Marcos

1 May 1980	Real Betis	1–1	Real Madrid CF	Sevilla
18:00 CET	Cabezas 4'	Report (in Spanish)	Santillana 30'	Stadium: Benito Villamarín; Attendance: 40,000; Referee: José Emilio Guruceta Muro

== Semi-finals ==
Team 1	Agg.	Team 2	1st leg	2nd leg
Atlético de Madrid	1–1 (3-4 p)	Real Madrid	0-0	1-1
Sporting de Gijón	3–4	Castilla	2-0	1-4

=== First leg ===
15 May 1980	Atlético de Madrid	0–0	Real Madrid CF	Madrid
18:00 CET		Report (in Spanish)		Stadium: Vicente Calderón; Referee: José María Miguel Pérez

15 May 1980	Sporting de Gijón	2–0	Castilla CF	Gijón
20:15 CET	Ciriaco 17' (pen.), 62' (pen.)	Report (in Spanish)		Stadium: El Molinón; Referee: Manuel Álvarez Margüenda

=== Second leg ===
22 May 1980	Castilla CF	4–1	Sporting de Gijón	Madrid
20:45 CET	Paco 3'; Sánchez Lorenzo 22'; Cidón 36'; Gallego 52'	Report (in Spanish)	Joaquín 70'	Stadium: Santiago Bernabéu; Attendance: 80,000; Referee: José María Enríquez Negreira

24 May 1980	Real Madrid CF	1–1 (a.e.t.) (4–3 p)	Atlético de Madrid	Madrid
20:45 CET	Juanito 19'	Report (in Spanish)	Ruiz 86'	Stadium: Santiago Bernabéu; Referee: Joaquín Ramos Marcos
	Penalties
	Santillana (penalty scored); Cunningham (penalty missed); Stielike (penalty scored); Juanito (penalty scored); García Remón (penalty scored)		(penalty scored) Quique Ramos; (penalty missed) Rubio; (penalty missed) Guzmán; (penalty scored) Bermejo; (penalty scored) Dirceu

== Final ==
4 June 1980
20:30 CET

Real Madrid C.F.	6–1	Castilla CF
Juanito 20', 89' (pen.); Santillana 42'; Sabido 59'; Del Bosque 62'; García Hernández 82'	Report (in Spanish)	Álvarez 80'

Santiago Bernabéu, Madrid
Attendance: 65,000
Referee: Franco Martínez (Region of Murcia)

Copa del Rey
1979–80 winners
Real Madrid C.F.
14th title
