= Palencia CF (1960) =

Spanish football club

Palencia
- Full name: Palencia Club de Fútbol
- Founded: 1960
- Dissolved: 1986
- Ground: La Balastera, Palencia, Castile and León, Spain
- Capacity: 13,468
- Chairman: Bonifacio Aguayo
- Manager: Crispi
- League: 2ªB - Group 1
- 1985–86: 2ªB - Group 1, 7th
Away colours

Palencia Club de Fútbol was a Spanish football club based in Palencia, in the autonomous community of Castile and León. Founded in 1960, it held home games at Estadio La Balastera, with a 13,468-seat capacity.

== History ==
Safe for five seasons in the regional leagues, Palencia spent the first 17 years of its existence in Tercera División. From 1977 to 1979, the club achieved two consecutive promotions, thus reaching Segunda División (second division), where it competed for four of the following five seasons, finishing a best-ever fifth in 1982–83, just three points off the promotion zone.

Palencia Club de Fútbol disappeared in 1986 due to serious economic debts, with the club now in Segunda División B. Another team was founded in the city following its demise, CF Palencia, which came to compete several seasons in that same category.

== Season to season ==
Season	Tier	Division	Place	Copa del Rey
1960–61	3	3ª	3rd	
1961–62	3	3ª	4th	
1962–63	3	3ª	2nd	
1963–64	3	3ª	15th	
1964–65	DNP			
1965–66	DNP			
1966–67	4	1ª Reg.	2nd	
1967–68	5	2ª Reg.	1st	
1968–69	4	1ª Reg.	1st	
1969–70	3	3ª	7th	First round
1970–71	3	3ª	3rd	First round
1971–72	3	3ª	11th	Second round
1972–73	3	3ª	3rd	First round

Season	Tier	Division	Place	Copa del Rey
1973–74	3	3ª	6th	Second round
1974–75	3	3ª	4th	Second round
1975–76	3	3ª	9th	First round
1976–77	3	3ª	8th	First round
1977–78	3	2ª B	13th	First round
1978–79	3	2ª B	1st	First round
1979–80	2	2ª	15th	Fifth round
1980–81	2	2ª	18th	Fourth round
1981–82	3	2ª B	2nd	Second round
1982–83	2	2ª	5th	Third round
1983–84	2	2ª	19th	Second round
1984–85	3	2ª B	12th	Second round
1985–86	3	2ª B	7th	

- 4 seasons in Segunda División
- 5 seasons in Segunda División B
- 12 seasons in Tercera División

== Selected former players ==
- (Argentina) Carlos Echarri
- (Argentina) Óscar Ferrero
- (Argentina) Joaquín López
- (Argentina) Hugo Módigo
- (El Salvador) Norberto Huezo
- (Spain) Paco Bonet
- (Spain) Antonio Teixidó
- (Paraguay) Benigno Chaparro

== Selected former managers ==
- (Spain) Luis Costa
- (Spain) Francisco Gento
- (Spain) Miguel Ángel Montes
