= Ángel Carvajal (footballer) =

Spanish footballer (born 2004)

Personal information
- Full name: Ángel Carvajal García
- Date of birth: 19 March 2004 (age 22)
- Place of birth: Madrid, Spain
- Height: 1.80 m (5 ft 11 in)
- Position: Forward

Team information
- Current team: Real Madrid B
- Number: 19

Youth career
- 2012–2021: Santa Ana
- 2021–2023: Real Madrid
- 2022–2023: → RC Alcobendas (loan)

Senior career*
Years	Team	Apps	(Gls)
2023–2025	Real Madrid C	55	(7)
2023	→ RC Alcobendas (loan)	1	(0)
2023–2025	Real Madrid B	2	(0)
2025–2026	Valladolid B	32	(20)
2026	Valladolid	4	(1)
2026–	Real Madrid B	0	(0)
- * Club domestic league appearances and goals as of 31 May 2026

Ángel Carvajal García (born 19 March 2004) is a Spanish footballer who plays as a forward for Real Madrid Castilla.

== Career ==
Born in Madrid, Carvajal joined Real Madrid's La Fábrica in 2021, from DAV Santa Ana. In 2022, despite being regularly used in the Juvenil B team, he was loaned to Rayo Ciudad Alcobendas CF, and made his senior debut on 28 May 2023, starting in a 2–1 Preferente de Madrid home loss to UD San Sebastián de los Reyes B.

Back to his parent club in July 2023, Carvajal was assigned to the C-team in Tercera Federación, and renewed his contract until 2027 on 15 September of that year. Regularly used in the C's, he first appeared with the reserves on 25 November, in a 0–0 draw at CD Alcoyano.

On 23 July 2025, after failing to make a breakthrough into the B-team, Carvajal moved to another reserve team, Real Valladolid Promesas in Segunda Federación. On 9 May of the following year, after scoring 20 goals and helping the B's to narrowly avoid relegation, he made his first team – and professional – debut; after coming on as a late substitute for Juanmi Latasa, he scored his side's second in a 2–0 Segunda División home win over Real Zaragoza with just 85 minutes on the field, becoming the quickest player from the youth sides off the mark in the club's history.

On 7 July 2026, Carvajal returned to Real Madrid after the club activated his buy-back clause.
