= These Football Times =

Association football magazine

- Editor: Omar Saleem
- Categories: Football
- Frequency: Bi-monthly
- Founded: 2011
- Country: United Kingdom
- Language: English Official website
- Available in: English
- Headquarters: {{{location_country}}}
- Creators: List of writers: Omar Saleem; Christopher Weir; Euan McTear; Jon Townsend; James Kelly; Will Sharp; Gary Thacker; Stuart Horsfield; Paul McParlan; Steven Scragg; Josh Butler; Aidan Williams; Billy Munday
- Website: thesefootballtimes.co thesefootballtimes.shop
- Current status: Active

These Football Times is an independent association football magazine and online publication that emphasizes long-form journalism. Each bi-monthly print issue aims to focus on a specific area of the sport or an individual club, with These Football Times often working directly with the clubs on production. As part of the Guardian Sport Network, These Football Times publishes feature articles regularly on TheGuardian.com as well. Andrew Flint, a senior writer for These Football Times, was named Football Supporters' Federation Writer of the Year in 2016, while many others have received the nomination, as well as for other awards across the football spectrum.
