= Sergio Mestre (footballer) =

Spanish footballer (born 2005)

Personal information
- Full name: Sergio Mestre Sánchez
- Date of birth: 13 February 2005 (age 21)
- Place of birth: Boadilla del Monte, Madrid, Spain
- Height: 1.93 m (6 ft 4 in)
- Position: Goalkeeper

Team information
- Current team: Real Madrid B
- Number: 1

Youth career
- 2011–2012: Club las Encinas
- 2012–2022: Atlético Madrid

Senior career*
Years	Team	Apps	(Gls)
2022–2024	Atlético Madrid B	0	(0)
2024–2025	Real Madrid C	13	(0)
2025–	Real Madrid B	15	(0)

International career
2022	Spain U17	1	(0)
- * Club domestic league appearances and goals as of 8 September 2026

Sergio Mestre Sánchez (born 13 February 2005) is a Spanish footballer currently playing as a goalkeeper for Real Madrid Castilla.

== Club career ==
Mestre is a product of the youth academy of his local club Club las Encinas, before moving to the academy of Atlético Madrid in 2012 and working through all their youth levels. He was promoted to Atlético Madrid B in 2022, but made no appearances. He was on the bench for the senior Atlético Madrid squad for a La Liga mach against Las Palmas on 15 November 2023. His contract with Atlético Madrid expired in June 2024.

On 3 July 2024, Mestre transferred to their crosstown rivals Real Madrid on a free, and was assigned to their C team. Ahead of the 2024–25 season, Mestre was registered in Real Madrid's senior side for the UEFA Champions League. On 13 September 2024, he was promoted to the matchday squad of Real Madrid for the first time, against Real Sociedad in La Liga.

It was on 1 July 2025 that Sergio Mestre moved up the ranks and joined the Merengues' B team, Real Madrid Castilla.

== International career ==
Mestre is a youth international for Spain, having played for the Spain U17s in 2022.
