= Ángel Franco Martínez =

Spanish football official (1938–2024)

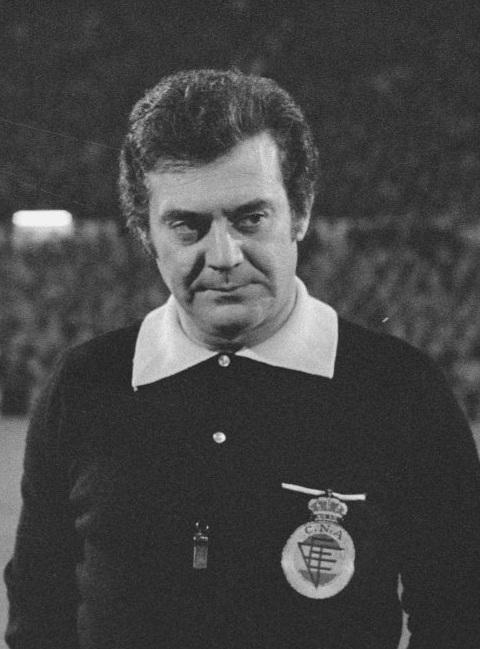
- Franco in 1976
- Born: 31 October 1938; Murcia, Spain
- Died: 3 February 2024 (aged 85)

Domestic
Years	League	Role
1966–1969	Segunda División	Official
1969–1986	La Liga	Official

Ángel Franco Martínez (31 October 1938 – 3 February 2024) was a Spanish football official. He officiated in the Segunda División from 1966 to 1969 and in La Liga from 1969 to 1986, refereeing a total of 186 matches.

He rose quickly from the lower divisions during the 1960s, when most Spanish referees were still known by their first surname, and sometimes also by their first name. The appearance of a young referee, in the newspapers, with the surname Franco gave rise to chronicles and headlines that Francisco Franco, a well-known football fan, was not amused by: Franco is very bad, Franco ruined the match, Everyone blames Franco, were some of the newspapers' headlines.

This type of commentary facilitated criticism of the dictator by some people of the time (or at least it could be understood that way), which provoked the immediate reaction of the dictator, who urged the refereeing bodies and the media to designate referees by both surnames, without exception. Therefore, Spanish referees are now known by their two surnames, paternal and maternal, unlike referees in other countries who are referred to by their first name and surname.
