= 1979–80 Segunda División =

49th season of the second-tier football league in Spain

Segunda División
- Season: 1979–80
- Dates: 1 September 1979 – 1 June 1980
- Champions: Murcia (5th title)
- Promoted: Valladolid; Osasuna
- Relegated: Celta; Deportivo La Coruña; Gimnàstic; Algeciras
- Cup Winners' Cup: Castilla CF
- Matches: 380
- Goals: 900 (2.37 per match)
- Top goalscorer: Patxi Iriguíbel (19 goals)

The 1979–80 Segunda División season saw 20 teams participate in the second flight Spanish league. Real Murcia won the league. Murcia, Real Valladolid and CA Osasuna were promoted to Primera División. Celta de Vigo, Deportivo de La Coruña, Gimnàstic de Tarragona and Algeciras CF were relegated to Segunda División B.

== Teams ==
Location of teams in Segunda División 1979-80

| Club | City | Stadium |
|---|---|---|
| Alavés | Vitoria | Mendizorrotza |
| Algeciras | Algeciras | El Mirador |
| Cádiz | Cádiz | Ramón de Carranza |
| Castellón | Castellón de la Plana | Castalia |
| Castilla | Madrid | Ciudad Deportiva |
| Celta de Vigo | Vigo | Balaídos |
| Deportivo La Coruña | La Coruña | Riazor |
| Elche | Elche | Martínez Valero |
| Getafe Deportivo | Getafe | Las Margaritas |
| Gimnàstic de Tarragona | Tarragona | José Luis Calderón |
| Granada | Granada | Los Cármenes |
| Levante | Valencia | Ciutat de València |
| Murcia | Murcia | La Condomina |
| Osasuna | Pamplona | El Sadar |
| Oviedo | Oviedo | Carlos Tartiere |
| Palencia | Palencia | La Balastera |
| Racing Santander | Santander | El Sardinero |
| Recreativo Huelva | Huelva | Colombino |
| Sabadell | Sabadell | Nova Creu Alta |
| Real Valladolid | Valladolid | José Zorrilla |

== Final table ==
| Pos | Team | Pld | W | D | L | GF | GA | GD | Pts | Promotion or relegation |
|---|---|---|---|---|---|---|---|---|---|---|
| 1 | Real Murcia | 38 | 19 | 9 | 10 | 58 | 39 | +19 | 47 | Promoted to Primera División |
| 2 | Real Valladolid | 38 | 17 | 11 | 10 | 53 | 40 | +13 | 45 | Promoted to Primera División |
| 3 | CA Osasuna | 38 | 20 | 4 | 14 | 74 | 49 | +25 | 44 | Promoted to Primera División |
| 4 | Elche CF | 38 | 15 | 12 | 11 | 46 | 41 | +5 | 42 | |
| 5 | CD Castellón | 38 | 16 | 10 | 12 | 47 | 42 | +5 | 42 | |
| 6 | CE Sabadell FC | 38 | 17 | 7 | 14 | 47 | 49 | −2 | 41 | |
| 7 | Castilla CF | 38 | 15 | 10 | 13 | 46 | 39 | +7 | 40 | Qualify for Cup Winners' Cup (Note: Since the Copa del Rey winners Real Madrid qualified for the European Cup, their place in the Cup Winners' Cup went to Castilla CF, who were the Copa del Rey runners-up.) |
| 8 | Cádiz CF | 38 | 15 | 9 | 14 | 43 | 42 | +1 | 39 | |
| 9 | Deportivo Alavés | 38 | 13 | 12 | 13 | 37 | 39 | −2 | 38 | |
| 10 | Levante UD | 38 | 15 | 8 | 15 | 47 | 51 | −4 | 38 | |
| 11 | Real Oviedo | 38 | 13 | 12 | 13 | 40 | 45 | −5 | 38 | |
| 12 | Recreativo de Huelva | 38 | 12 | 13 | 13 | 38 | 42 | −4 | 37 | |
| 13 | Granada CF | 38 | 13 | 11 | 14 | 42 | 42 | 0 | 37 | |
| 14 | Getafe Deportivo | 38 | 13 | 11 | 14 | 44 | 50 | −6 | 37 | |
| 15 | Palencia CF | 38 | 11 | 14 | 13 | 49 | 49 | 0 | 36 | |
| 16 | Racing de Santander | 38 | 10 | 16 | 12 | 34 | 39 | −5 | 36 | |
| 17 | Celta de Vigo | 38 | 12 | 11 | 15 | 48 | 43 | +5 | 35 | Relegated to Segunda División B |
| 18 | Deportivo de La Coruña | 38 | 15 | 5 | 18 | 49 | 50 | −1 | 35 | Relegated to Segunda División B |
| 19 | Gimnàstic de Tarragona | 38 | 8 | 11 | 19 | 29 | 61 | −32 | 27 | Relegated to Segunda División B |
| 20 | Algeciras CF | 38 | 7 | 12 | 19 | 29 | 48 | −19 | 26 | Relegated to Segunda División B |

Source: BDFutbol

== Results ==
| Home \ Away | ALV | ALG | CÁD | CAS | CST | CEL | DEP | ELC | GET | GIM | GRA | LEV | MUR | OSA | OVI | PAL | RAC | REC | SAB | VLD |
|---|---|---|---|---|---|---|---|---|---|---|---|---|---|---|---|---|---|---|---|---|
| Alavés | — | 1–0 | 2–0 | 2–0 | 2–0 | 0–0 | 0–0 | 1–3 | 1–0 | 3–1 | 2–0 | 2–1 | 1–1 | 0–2 | 2–0 | 1–1 | 1–1 | 1–1 | 1–0 | 0–5 |
| Algeciras | 0–0 | — | 0–0 | 0–1 | 3–3 | 0–0 | 1–3 | 2–2 | 1–1 | 2–0 | 2–1 | 1–1 | 2–0 | 1–0 | 1–1 | 1–1 | 2–0 | 1–0 | 2–3 | 0–0 |
| Cádiz | 2–1 | 1–0 | — | 2–0 | 1–0 | 1–0 | 3–0 | 4–2 | 0–0 | 4–1 | 1–0 | 4–0 | 1–0 | 2–1 | 2–1 | 1–0 | 2–2 | 1–1 | 0–0 | 0–1 |
| Castellón | 2–1 | 2–0 | 1–1 | — | 3–0 | 1–0 | 2–0 | 1–0 | 3–2 | 2–0 | 1–1 | 2–2 | 0–0 | 1–0 | 3–2 | 3–2 | 2–0 | 0–0 | 2–1 | 3–0 |
| Castilla | 1–0 | 4–1 | 2–0 | 1–1 | — | 2–1 | 2–0 | 1–1 | 2–1 | 1–1 | 1–1 | 2–0 | 1–2 | 3–1 | 1–0 | 1–0 | 0–0 | 3–0 | 2–0 | 1–2 |
| Celta | 2–2 | 1–0 | 3–0 | 2–1 | 1–1 | — | 2–0 | 1–1 | 4–0 | 5–0 | 2–2 | 2–1 | 0–0 | 4–2 | 3–0 | 2–1 | 1–1 | 2–1 | 1–2 | 1–2 |
| Deportivo | 1–1 | 3–0 | 1–0 | 1–0 | 1–2 | 2–1 | — | 0–1 | 3–0 | 4–1 | 1–0 | 1–2 | 5–2 | 3–1 | 1–0 | 3–0 | 0–0 | 0–1 | 3–0 | 2–1 |
| Elche | 1–0 | 2–0 | 1–0 | 1–0 | 1–2 | 2–1 | 3–0 | — | 0–0 | 0–0 | 2–0 | 1–1 | 0–0 | 2–2 | 2–1 | 4–0 | 2–0 | 2–1 | 1–3 | 1–0 |
| Getafe | 2–1 | 1–0 | 3–2 | 2–1 | 2–1 | 2–0 | 3–4 | 1–1 | — | 0–0 | 0–1 | 0–0 | 2–0 | 2–1 | 1–1 | 1–1 | 2–0 | 1–3 | 3–2 | 1–1 |
| Gimnàstic | 1–0 | 1–0 | 1–1 | 1–0 | 1–0 | 2–0 | 3–2 | 0–0 | 2–2 | — | 3–2 | 0–1 | 2–3 | 0–1 | 2–2 | 2–2 | 0–0 | 0–0 | 2–1 | 0–2 |
| Granada | 2–2 | 0–0 | 2–1 | 4–2 | 0–0 | 2–0 | 0–0 | 3–0 | 2–1 | 1–0 | — | 5–1 | 0–1 | 0–0 | 0–0 | 1–0 | 1–1 | 0–1 | 3–2 | 3–0 |
| Levante | 1–0 | 1–2 | 2–0 | 1–2 | 2–0 | 0–0 | 2–0 | 3–1 | 3–1 | 1–0 | 2–0 | — | 1–2 | 2–1 | 3–0 | 2–1 | 1–1 | 2–0 | 2–3 | 1–0 |
| Murcia | 2–1 | 1–0 | 1–1 | 3–0 | 1–0 | 3–1 | 3–1 | 4–1 | 2–0 | 2–0 | 3–0 | 4–1 | — | 0–1 | 4–0 | 1–2 | 3–0 | 2–1 | 1–2 | 0–0 |
| Osasuna | 2–0 | 2–1 | 4–2 | 3–1 | 1–0 | 1–0 | 4–2 | 2–1 | 2–2 | 2–0 | 5–0 | 3–0 | 2–2 | — | 4–2 | 5–1 | 3–0 | 6–0 | 5–1 | 4–2 |
| Oviedo | 0–1 | 2–0 | 3–0 | 1–1 | 1–0 | 2–1 | 1–1 | 1–0 | 1–0 | 3–1 | 0–2 | 1–0 | 2–1 | 2–1 | — | 1–0 | 0–0 | 2–1 | 2–0 | 2–2 |
| Palencia | 0–1 | 1–1 | 0–1 | 0–0 | 1–1 | 4–2 | 1–0 | 2–0 | 3–1 | 3–0 | 1–0 | 3–0 | 1–1 | 2–0 | 0–0 | — | 2–2 | 2–2 | 2–0 | 1–1 |
| Racing | 0–2 | 1–0 | 3–1 | 3–1 | 2–0 | 0–0 | 2–0 | 0–1 | 1–0 | 0–0 | 1–0 | 2–1 | 2–2 | 3–0 | 2–1 | 1–1 | — | 0–1 | 1–1 | 1–1 |
| Recreativo | 3–0 | 3–1 | 0–0 | 1–1 | 1–1 | 0–2 | 1–0 | 2–1 | 0–1 | 3–0 | 0–0 | 1–1 | 1–0 | 2–0 | 0–0 | 2–2 | 2–1 | — | 0–0 | 0–1 |
| Sabadell | 0–0 | 2–1 | 2–1 | 1–0 | 2–1 | 0–0 | 3–1 | 0–0 | 0–1 | 1–0 | 0–1 | 2–1 | 0–1 | 2–0 | 1–1 | 4–3 | 1–0 | 3–1 | — | 2–1 |
| Valladolid | 1–1 | 2–0 | 1–0 | 1–1 | 1–3 | 2–0 | 1–0 | 2–2 | 0–2 | 5–1 | 3–2 | 1–1 | 4–0 | 1–0 | 1–1 | 0–2 | 1–0 | 2–1 | 2–0 | — |

Source: BDFutbol
Legend: Blue = home team win; Yellow = draw; Red = away team win.

== Pichichi Trophy for top goalscorers ==
| Goalscorers | Goals | Team |
|---|---|---|
| (Spain) Patxi Iriguíbel | 19 | Osasuna |
| (Argentina) Mario Cabrera | 17 | Castellón |
| (Spain) José Echeverria | 15 | Osasuna |
