= Real Madrid Castilla =

Spanish football team and the reserve team of Real Madrid CF

- Full name: Real Madrid Castilla Club de Fútbol
- Nicknames: Castilla; RM B
- Founded: 16 December 1930 (as Agrupación Deportiva; Plus Ultra)
- Stadium: Estadio Alfredo Di Stéfano
- Capacity: 6,000
- President: Florentino Pérez
- Head coach: Julián López de Lerma
- League: Primera Federación – Group 2
- 2025–26: Primera Federación – Group 1, 5th of 20
| Home colours | Away colours | Third colours |

Real Madrid Castilla Club de Fútbol or Real Madrid B is a Spanish football team that plays in Primera Federación – Group 2. It is Real Madrid's reserve team. They play their home games at the Alfredo Di Stéfano Stadium with a capacity of 6,000 seats.

Reserve teams in Spain play in the same league system as their senior team rather than a separate league. Reserve teams, however, cannot play in the same division as their senior team. Therefore, Real Madrid Castilla are ineligible for promotion to the La Liga as long as Real Madrid plays there. Consequently, they must play at least one level below their main side and they are not eligible to play in the Copa del Rey. In addition, only under-23 players, or under-25 players with a professional contract, can switch between senior and reserve teams.

== History ==
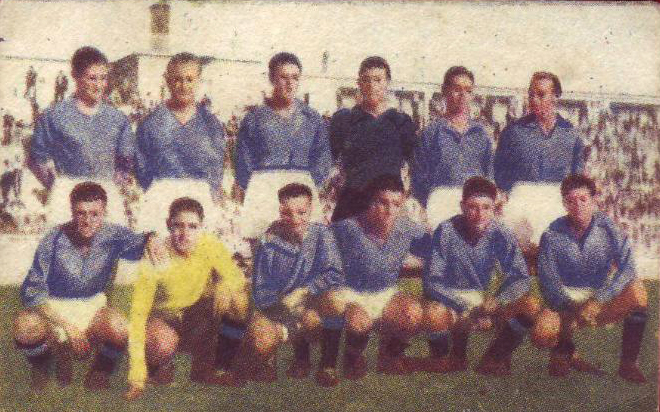
AD Plus Ultra in the 1949–50 season.

=== AD Plus Ultra ===
In 1948, Agrupación Deportiva Plus Ultra, a local amateur team, then playing in the Tercera División, agreed to become a feeder club for Real Madrid. Originally formed in 1930, the team took its name from the national motto of Spain. Real gave AD Plus Ultra financial support and in return were given first refusal on the club's best players. By 1949, they made their debut in the Segunda División and in 1952, the club became the official Real reserve team. In 1959, they reached the quarter-finals of the Copa del Generalísimo, losing 7–2 on aggregate to eventual runners-up Granada.

During the 1950s and 1960s, future senior Real Madrid players and Spanish internationals such as José María Zárraga, Enrique Mateos, Ramón Marsal, Pedro Casado, Juan Manuel Villa, José María Vidal, Fernando Serena and Ramón Grosso all spent time at the club, and Juan Alonso finished off his career there. The singer Julio Iglesias played as a goalkeeper for the club in the early 1960s until injury ended his football career. Miguel Muñoz began his coaching career at the club. In 1972, Plus Ultra folded because of the demise of the insurance company of the same name, and their position in the Tercera División was taken by Castilla Club de Fútbol, the new reserve team for Real Madrid, on 21 July.

=== Castilla CF ===
Former logo of Castilla.

As Castilla CF, the team enjoyed something of a golden age. During this era, with a team that included Agustín, Ricardo Gallego and Francisco Pineda, Castilla reached the final of the 1979–80 Copa del Rey. During their cup run, they beat four Primera División teams, including Hércules, Athletic Bilbao, Real Sociedad and Sporting de Gijón. The latter two eventually finished second and third in the Primera División. In the final, they played Real Madrid but lost 6–1. Because Real also won the Primera División, however, Castilla qualified for the 1980–81 European Cup Winners' Cup. Despite beating West Ham United 3–1 in the opening game at the Santiago Bernabéu, they lost the return 5–1 after extra time and went out in the first round. Castilla reached the quarter-finals of the Copa del Rey on three further occasions, in 1984, 1986, and 1988.

In 1984, with Amancio Amaro as coach, Castilla won the Segunda División. Amaro's tenure as coach saw the rise of the famous La Quinta del Buitre – Emilio Butragueño, Manolo Sanchís, Martín Vázquez, Míchel, and Miguel Pardeza. Castilla were ineligible for promotion, however, because Real Madrid were already in the Primera División. In the 1987–88 season, they finished third in the Segunda División, but were once again ineligible for promotion.

=== Real Madrid B ===
In 1991, the Royal Spanish Football Federation banned the use of separate names for reserve teams and Castilla CF became known as Real Madrid Deportiva and then Real Madrid B. In the early 1990s, two former Castilla players, Vicente del Bosque and Rafael Benítez, began their coaching careers with the team. In 1997, the team was relegated to the Segunda División B, but despite this, they continued to produce internationally acclaimed players. These have included Raúl, Guti and Iker Casillas, who all became established members of the senior Real Madrid team.

=== Real Madrid Castilla ===
In the 2004–05 season, coach Juan Ramón López Caro guided the team back to the Segunda División and the team subsequently revived the El Castilla name and became known as Real Madrid Castilla. In 2006, the new stadium of the club's training facilities Ciudad Real Madrid was named the Alfredo Di Stéfano Stadium and Francisco Moreno Cariñena became the first independent chairman in 16 years. In this year, the team also has continued to produce quality players such as Roberto Soldado and Álvaro Arbeloa.

In the 2006–2007 season, the team was relegated to the Segunda División B under the management of ex-Real Madrid legend Míchel (José Miguel González Martín del Campo) after occupying 19th place in the league in a disappointing season. Míchel received a lot of criticism and accepted all the blame for the team's bad performances, especially for those who had a wonderful season in the 2005–06 season, such as Rubén de la Red, Esteban Granero and Javi García. The reserves produced other quality players, including Juan Mata and Álvaro Negredo.

Real Madrid Castilla was promoted back to the Segunda División at the end of the 2011–12 season after beating Cádiz in the play-offs with an aggregate of score 8–1 and this year the club produced one quality player, Dani Carvajal who was sold to Bayer Leverkusen in 2012 before he returned to Real Madrid in 2013 to play with the first team.

In the 2013–14 season, three quality players Nacho, Álvaro Morata and Jesé were promoted to the first team, and then Castilla was relegated after being defeated by Real Murcia in the last matchday of the season.

Since 2014 when they played in the third division, Castilla continued to produce other quality players, including Lucas Vázquez, Fernando Pacheco, Borja Mayoral, Marcos Llorente, Sergio Reguilón, Óscar Rodríguez, Achraf Hakimi and Fran García.

After the resumption of competitions in the 2020–21 season, the team finished runner-up in their group and qualified to play in the promotion system to the new categories of Spanish football after a restructuring of the same by the RFEF for the 2021–22 season. In the promotion playoffs, the team finished third, which secured their place in the Primera Federación. They also had the chance to move up to the Segunda División, but they were eliminated in the semifinals by Ibiza. The team was thus one of those that premiered the new Primera Federación, being placed in Group II. In 2022–23 season, Castilla placed in Group I and finished in third place, they have chance promotion to Segunda División, but they were eliminated in the final play off by Eldense. In the 2023–24 season, still under the direction of Raúl González, they finished in tenth position. In 2024–25 season, Castilla failed achieved to play off promotion to Segunda and finished in sixth position, this year one of quality player Raúl Asencio made his debut with first team and become part of first team following injuries to the defenders in the first team.

Starting of 2025–26 season, Raúl left as Castilla head coach and replaced by Álvaro Arbeloa.

== Season by season ==
- As AD Plus Ultra

| Season | Tier | Division | Place | Copa del Rey |
|---|---|---|---|---|
| 1940–41 | 4 | 1ª Reg. | 3rd | |
| 1941–42 | 3 | 1ª Reg. | 2nd | |
| 1942–43 | 3 | 1ª Reg. | 5th | |
| 1943–44 | 5 | 2ª Reg. | 1st | |
| 1944–45 | 4 | 1ª Reg. | 7th | |
| 1945–46 | 4 | 1ª Reg. | 2nd | |
| 1946–47 | 3 | 3ª | 5th | |
| 1947–48 | 3 | 3ª | 5th | First round |
| 1948–49 | 3 | 3ª | 1st | Second round |
| 1949–50 | 2 | 2ª | 3rd | Third round |
| 1950–51 | 2 | 2ª | 7th | DNQ |
| 1951–52 | 2 | 2ª | 12th | DNQ |
| 1952–53 | 2 | 2ª | 15th | First round |
| 1953–54 | 3 | 3ª | 3rd | |
| 1954–55 | 3 | 3ª | 1st | |
| 1955–56 | 2 | 2ª | 15th | |

| Season | Tier | Division | Place | Copa del Rey |
|---|---|---|---|---|
| 1956–57 | 3 | 3ª | 1st | |
| 1957–58 | 2 | 2ª | 7th | |
| 1958–59 | 2 | 2ª | 10th | Quarter-finals |
| 1959–60 | 2 | 2ª | 4th | Second round |
| 1960–61 | 2 | 2ª | 7th | First round |
| 1961–62 | 2 | 2ª | 7th | First round |
| 1962–63 | 2 | 2ª | 16th | First round |
| 1963–64 | 3 | 3ª | 1st | |
| 1964–65 | 3 | 3ª | 3rd | |
| 1965–66 | 3 | 3ª | 1st | |
| 1966–67 | 3 | 3ª | 2nd | |
| 1967–68 | 3 | 3ª | 1st | |
| 1968–69 | 3 | 3ª | 3rd | |
| 1969–70 | 3 | 3ª | 3rd | Second round |
| 1970–71 | 3 | 3ª | 11th | First round |
| 1971–72 | 3 | 3ª | 10th | Second round |

- As Castilla CF

| Season | Tier | Division | Place | Copa del Rey |
|---|---|---|---|---|
| 1972–73 | 3 | 3ª | 4th | First round |
| 1973–74 | 3 | 3ª | 4th | Third round |
| 1974–75 | 3 | 3ª | 4th | Third round |
| 1975–76 | 3 | 3ª | 3rd | First round |
| 1976–77 | 3 | 3ª | 4th | Second round |
| 1977–78 | 3 | 2ª B | 2nd | Second round |
| 1978–79 | 2 | 2ª | 7th | Third round |
| 1979–80 | 2 | 2ª | 7th | Runners-up |
| 1980–81 | 2 | 2ª | 11th | Fourth round |
| 1981–82 | 2 | 2ª | 8th | Third round |

| Season | Tier | Division | Place | Copa del Rey |
|---|---|---|---|---|
| 1982–83 | 2 | 2ª | 6th | Second round |
| 1983–84 | 2 | 2ª | 1st | Quarter-finals |
| 1984–85 | 2 | 2ª | 5th | Second round |
| 1985–86 | 2 | 2ª | 12th | Quarter-finals |
| 1986–87 | 2 | 2ª | 17th | First round |
| 1987–88 | 2 | 2ª | 3rd | Quarter-finals |
| 1988–89 | 2 | 2ª | 15th | Second round |
| 1989–90 | 2 | 2ª | 18th | First round |
| 1990–91 | 3 | 2ª B | 1st | N/A |

- As a reserve team

| Season | Tier | Division | Place |
|---|---|---|---|
| 1991–92 | 2 | 2ª | 16th |
| 1992–93 | 2 | 2ª | 6th |
| 1993–94 | 2 | 2ª | 6th |
| 1994–95 | 2 | 2ª | 8th |
| 1995–96 | 2 | 2ª | 4th |
| 1996–97 | 2 | 2ª | 18th |
| 1997–98 | 3 | 2ª B | 2nd |
| 1998–99 | 3 | 2ª B | 3rd |
| 1999–2000 | 3 | 2ª B | 5th |
| 2000–01 | 3 | 2ª B | 7th |
| 2001–02 | 3 | 2ª B | 1st |
| 2002–03 | 3 | 2ª B | 6th |
| 2003–04 | 3 | 2ª B | 2nd |
| 2004–05 | 3 | 2ª B | 1st |
| 2005–06 | 2 | 2ª | 11th |
| 2006–07 | 2 | 2ª | 19th |
| 2007–08 | 3 | 2ª B | 5th |
| 2008–09 | 3 | 2ª B | 6th |
| 2009–10 | 3 | 2ª B | 8th |
| 2010–11 | 3 | 2ª B | 3rd |

| Season | Tier | Division | Place |
|---|---|---|---|
| 2011–12 | 3 | 2ª B | 1st |
| 2012–13 | 2 | 2ª | 8th |
| 2013–14 | 2 | 2ª | 20th |
| 2014–15 | 3 | 2ª B | 6th |
| 2015–16 | 3 | 2ª B | 1st |
| 2016–17 | 3 | 2ª B | 11th |
| 2017–18 | 3 | 2ª B | 8th |
| 2018–19 | 3 | 2ª B | 4th |
| 2019–20 | 3 | 2ª B | 7th |
| 2020–21 | 3 | 2ª B | 2nd / 3rd |
| 2021–22 | 3 | 1ª RFEF | 10th |
| 2022–23 | 3 | 1ª Fed. | 3rd |
| 2023–24 | 3 | 1ª Fed. | 10th |
| 2024–25 | 3 | 1ª Fed. | 6th |
| 2025–26 | 3 | 1ª Fed. | 5th |
| 2026–27 | 3 | 1ª Fed. | |

- 33 seasons in Segunda División
- 6 seasons in Primera Federación/Primera División RFEF
- 22 seasons in Segunda División B
- 20 seasons in Tercera División

=== European record ===
European Cup Winners' Cup:

| Season | Round | Club | Home | Away | Aggregate |
|---|---|---|---|---|---|
| 1980–81 | 1R | (England) West Ham United | 3–1 | 1–5 (aet) | 4–6 |

== Honours ==
- Segunda División
  - Winners (1): 1983–84
- Copa del Rey
  - Runners-up (1): 1979–80
- Segunda División B
  - Winners (4): 1990–91, 2001–02, 2004–05, 2011–12
- Tercera División
  - Winners (6): 1948–49, 1954–55, 1956–57, 1963–64, 1965–66, 1967–68
- Teide Trophy
  - Winners (5): 2001, 2002, 2005, 2011, 2024

== Players ==
=== Current squad ===
As of 23 September 2026

Note: Flags indicate national team as defined under FIFA eligibility rules; some limited exceptions apply. Players may hold more than one non-FIFA nationality.

| No. | Pos. | Nation | Player |
|---|---|---|---|
| 1 | GK | ESP | Sergio Mestre |
| 2 | DF | ESP | Jesús Fortea |
| 3 | DF | ESP | Diego Aguado |
| 4 | DF | ESP | Mario Rivas |
| 5 | DF | ESP | Joan Martínez |
| 6 | MF | ESP | Jorge Cestero |
| 7 | FW | ESP | Daniel Yáñez |
| 8 | MF | ESP | Hugo de Llanos |
| 9 | FW | ESP | Rachad Fettal |
| 10 | MF | ESP | Pol Fortuny (captain) |
| 11 | FW | ESP | Álvaro Leiva |
| 12 | GK | ESP | Diego Arroyo |

| No. | Pos. | Nation | Player |
|---|---|---|---|
| 13 | GK | ESP | Javi Navarro |
| 14 | MF | ESP | Izan Regueira |
| 16 | MF | ESP | Sergio Martínez |
| 17 | MF | ESP | Alexis Ciria |
| 19 | FW | ESP | Ángel Carvajal |
| 20 | MF | ESP | Roberto Martín |
| 21 | DF | GHA | Oscar Naasei |
| 22 | MF | ESP | Daniel Mesonero |
| 23 | DF | ESP | Lamini Fati |
| 24 | MF | ESP | Thiago Pitarch |
| 25 | GK | ESP | Ferrán Quetglas |

=== From Real Madrid C and Youth academy ===
Note: Flags indicate national team as defined under FIFA eligibility rules; some limited exceptions apply. Players may hold more than one non-FIFA nationality.

| No. | Pos. | Nation | Player |
|---|---|---|---|
| 26 | MF | ESP | Beto |
| 27 | DF | ESP | Álvaro Lezcano |
| 28 | MF | ESP | Diego Lacosta |
| 29 | MF | ESP | Manex Rezola |
| 32 | DF | ESP | Alfredo Sotres |

| No. | Pos. | Nation | Player |
|---|---|---|---|
| 34 | MF | ESP | Jorge Rajado |
| 35 | DF | ESP | José Luis Espinosa |
| 36 | DF | ESP | Melvin Ukpeigbe |
| 38 | FW | ESP | Fran Santamaría |
| 39 | MF | ESP | Adrián Pérez |

=== Players on loan ===
Note: Flags indicate national team as defined under FIFA eligibility rules; some limited exceptions apply. Players may hold more than one non-FIFA nationality.

| No. | Pos. | Nation | Player |

== Personnel ==
=== Current technical staff ===
| Position | Staff |
|---|---|
| Head coach | (Spain) Julián López de Lerma |
| Assistant coach | (Spain) Miguel Barrio (Spain) Víctor Cea |
| Goalkeeping coach | (Spain) Diego López |
| Field delegate | (Spain) David Casado |
| Team delegate | (Spain) José Javier Padilla |
| Fitness coach | (Spain) Marcos Chena |
| Doctor | (Spain) Elena Isla (Spain) Juan Ignacio Marco |
| Physiotherapist | (Spain) Tirso Llorente |

- Last updated: 3 June 2026
- Source: Real Madrid CF

== Coaches ==
- As AD Plus Ultra
- (Spain) José Quirante (1948–1951)
- (Spain) Antonio Bonet (1951–1952)
- (Spain) Francisco Trinchant (1952–1959)
- (Spain) Miguel Muñoz (1959–1960)
- (Spain) José Gil Montero (1960)
- (France) Louis Hon (1960–1961)
- (Spain) Luis Pasarín (1961–1963)
- (Spain) Francisco Trinchant (1963)
- (Spain) Julio Martialay (1963–1965)
- (Spain) Juan Santisteban (1968–1969)
- (Spain) Pablo Olmedo (1969–1970)
- (Spain) Enrique Bescós (1970–1971)
- (Spain) Manuel Peñalva (1971–1972)
- As Castilla CF
- (Spain) Antonio Ruiz (1972–1974)
- (Spain) Manuel Sanchís (1974–1977)
- (Spain) Juan Santisteban (1977–1979)
- (Spain) Juanjo (1979–1981)
- (Spain) Juan Santisteban (1981–1982)
- (Spain) Amancio Amaro (1982–1984)
- (Spain) Ramón Grosso (1984)
- (Spain) Juan Santisteban (1984–1987)
- (Spain) Ramón Grosso (1987)
- (Spain) Vicente del Bosque (1987–1990)
- As a reserve team
- (Spain) Mariano García Remón (1990–1993)
- (Spain) Rafael Benítez (1993–1995)
- (Spain) Francisco García Hernández (1994)
- (Argentina) Sergio Egea (1995–1997)
- (Spain) Ramón Grosso (1997)
- (Spain) Toni Grande (1997)
- (Spain) Francisco García Hernández (1997)
- (Spain) Miguel Ángel Portugal (1997–1999)
- (Spain) Francisco García Hernández (1999–2000)
- (Spain) Francisco Buyo (2000–2001)
- (Spain) Juan Ramón López Caro (2001–2005)
- (Spain) Miguel Ángel Portugal (2005–2006)
- (Spain) Míchel (2006–2007)
- (Spain) Juan Carlos Mandiá (2007–2008)
- (Spain) Julen Lopetegui (2008–2009)
- (Spain) Alejandro Menéndez (2009–2011)
- (Spain) Alberto Toril (2011–2013)
- (Spain) Manolo Díaz (2013–2014)
- (France) Zinedine Zidane (2014–2016)
- (Spain) Luis Miguel Ramis (2016)
- (Argentina) Santiago Solari (2016–2018)
- (Spain) Manolo Díaz (2018–2019)
- (Spain) Raúl (2019–2025)
- (Spain) Álvaro Arbeloa (2025–2026)
- (Spain) Julián López de Lerma (2026–)

== Records ==
Players in bold are still active with club.

=== Top scorers ===
All competitions (excluding Third Division and regional)

| Ranking | Nationality | Name | Years | Goals |
|---|---|---|---|---|
| 1 | Spain | Roberto Soldado | 2002–2006 | 70 |
| 2 | Spain | Paco Machín | 1979–1982 | 50 |
| 3 | Spain | Álvaro Morata | 2010–2013 | 45 |
| 4 | Spain | Sergio Arribas | 2020–2023 | 41 |
| 5 | Spain | Miguel Bernal | 1977–1981 | 40 |
| 5 | Spain | Emilio Butragueño | 1982–1984 | 40 |
| 5 | Spain | Joselu | 2010–2012 | 40 |
| 8 | Spain | Luis García | 2001–2003 | 37 |
| 9 | Spain | José Manuel García Castro | 1974–1976, 1977–1981 | 32 |
| 9 | Spain | Francesc Xavier Julià | 1980–1985 | 32 |
| 9 | Spain | Míchel | 1981–1984 | 32 |
| 9 | Spain | Jesé | 2011–2013 | 32 |
| 9 | Dominican Republic | Mariano Díaz | 2014–2016 | 32 |
| 9 | Spain | Cristo González | 2017–2019 | 32 |

=== Most appearances ===
All competitions

| Ranking | Nationality | Name | Years | Apps |
|---|---|---|---|---|
| 1 | Spain | Casimiro Torres | 1978–1983 | 173 |
| 2 | Spain | Miguel Bernal | 1977–1981 | 168 |
| 3 | Spain | José Manuel Espinosa | 1977–1982 | 157 |
| 4 | Spain | Francis Rodríguez | 1981–1984, 1985–1986 | 156 |
| 4 | Spain | Pedro Mosquera | 2006–2010, 2011–2013 | 156 |
| 6 | Spain | Juanito Felipe | 1979–1982, 1983–1984 | 143 |
| 7 | Spain | Juan Carlos López Martín | 1987–1992 | 142 |
| 8 | Spain | Juanfran Moreno | 2009–2013 | 138 |
| 9 | Spain | Míchel | 1981–1984 | 135 |
| 10 | Spain | Vicente Blanco Brazales | 1977–1979, 1980–1981, 1983–1984 | 134 |

== Stadium ==
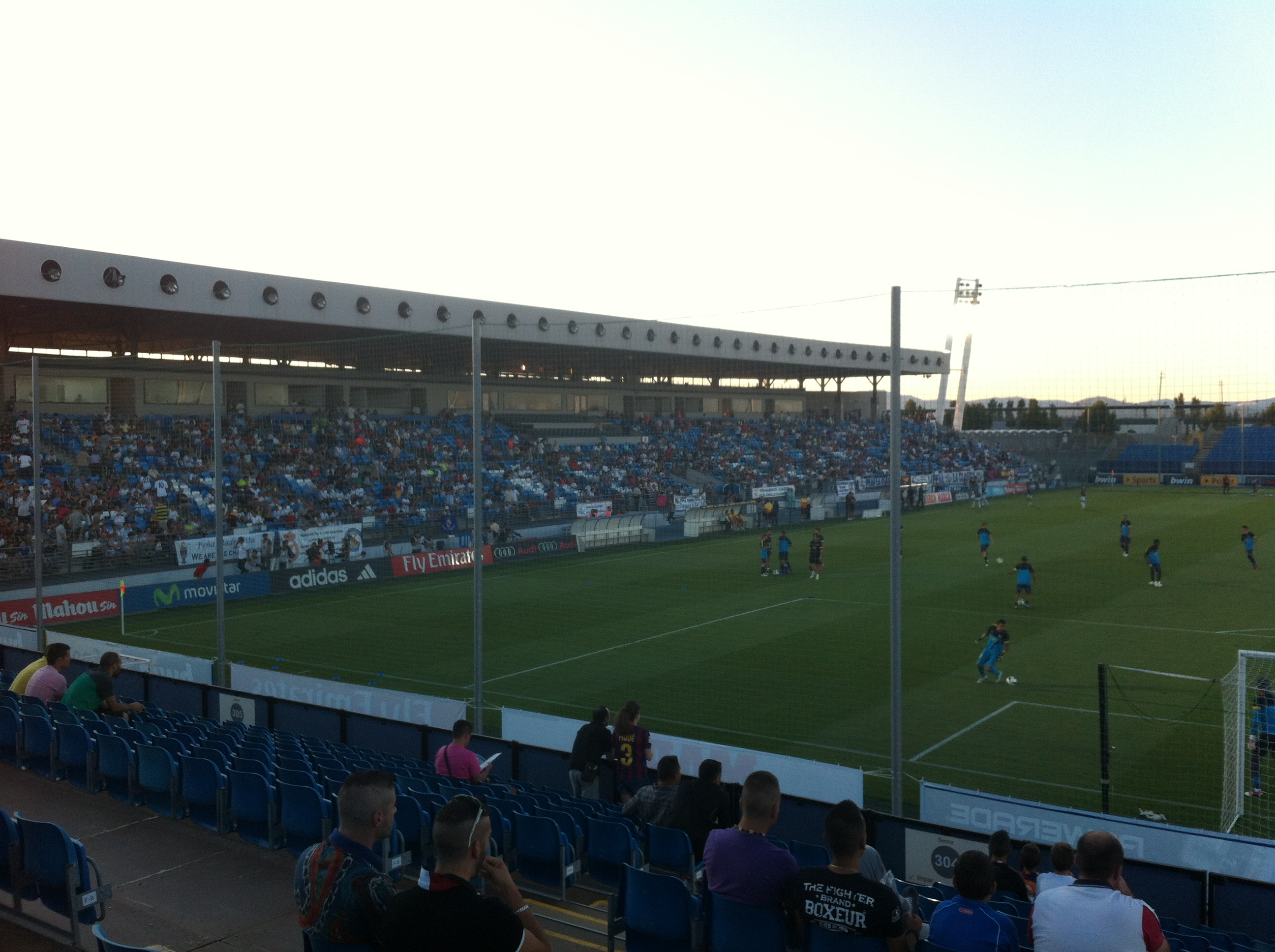
Alfredo Di Stéfano Stadium

On 9 May 2006, the Alfredo Di Stéfano Stadium was inaugurated at the City of Madrid where Real Madrid usually trains. The inaugural match was between Real Madrid and Stade de Reims, a rematch of the European Cup final won by Real Madrid in 1956. Real Madrid won the inaugural match 6–1 with goals from Sergio Ramos, Antonio Cassano (2), Roberto Soldado (2), and José Manuel Jurado.

The venue is part of the Ciudad Real Madrid, the club's new training facilities located outside Madrid in Valdebebas, near Madrid–Barajas Airport.

The capacity of the main stand at the west is 4,000 seats, with additional 2,000 seats at the eastern stand, giving the stadium a total capacity of 6,000 seats. It is envisaged to increase the seating capacity up to 25,000 at the completion of the expansion.

== Notable players ==
Note: This list includes players that have appeared in at least 100 top league games and/or have reached international status.

- (Andorra) Antoni Lima
- (Algeria) Luca Zidane
- (Argentina) Esteban Cambiasso
- (Argentina) Juan Esnáider
- (Argentina) Nico Paz
- (Argentina) Rolando Zárate
- (Austria) Philipp Lienhart
- (Brazil) Casemiro
- (Brazil) César Prates
- (Brazil) Fabinho
- (Brazil) Pablo Felipe
- (Brazil) Filipe Luís
- (Brazil) Iarley
- (Brazil) Reinier Jesus
- (Brazil) Rodrygo
- (Brazil) Vinícius Júnior
- (Brazil) Willian José
- (Cape Verde) Valdo
- (China) Lin Liangming
- (Denmark) Flemming Povlsen
- (Dominican Republic) Mariano Díaz
- (Dominican Republic) Peter González
- (Dominican Republic) Edgar Pujol
- (Dominican Republic) Luismi Quezada
- (Equatorial Guinea) Javier Balboa
- (Equatorial Guinea) Rubén Belima
- (Equatorial Guinea) Chupe
- (Equatorial Guinea) Juan Epitié
- (Equatorial Guinea) Omar Mascarell
- (Equatorial Guinea) Loren Zúñiga
- (Finland) Eero Markkanen
- (Ghana) Daniel Opare
- (Hungary) Ádám Szalai
- (Iceland) Andri Guðjohnsen
- (Mexico) Álvaro Fidalgo
- (Morocco) Achraf Hakimi
- (Nigeria) Mutiu Adepoju
- (Nigeria) Oladimeji Lawal
- (Nigeria) Christopher Ohen
- (Norway) Martin Ødegaard
- (Paraguay) Sergio Díaz
- (Peru) Cristian Benavente
- (Portugal) Pedro Mendes
- (Puerto Rico) Jeremy de León
- (Russia) Denis Cheryshev
- (Spain) Antonio Adán
- (Spain) Albert Aguilà
- (Spain) Agustín
- (Spain) Adolfo Aldana
- (Spain) Marcos Alonso
- (Spain) Mikel Antía
- (Spain) Francisco José Antón
- (Spain) Santiago Aragón
- (Spain) Carlos Aranda
- (Spain) Álvaro Arbeloa
- (Spain) David Barral
- (Spain) Miguel Bernal
- (Spain) Antonio Blanco
- (Spain) Alberto Bueno
- (Spain) Burgui
- (Spain) Emilio Butragueño
- (Spain) José Callejón
- (Spain) José Antonio Camacho
- (Spain) José Luis Caminero
- (Spain) Santiago Cañizares
- (Spain) Dani Carvajal
- (Spain) Kiko Casilla
- (Spain) Iker Casillas
- (Spain) Javier Castañeda
- (Spain) Chendo
- (Spain) Cholo
- (Spain) Pedro Contreras
- (Spain) Corona
- (Spain) Enrique Corrales
- (Spain) Isidro Díaz
- (Spain) Hugo Duro
- (Spain) José Manuel Espinosa
- (Spain) Kiko Femenía
- (Spain) Alfonso Fraile
- (Spain) Álex Fernández
- (Spain) Fernando Fernández
- (Spain) Borja Fernández
- (Spain) Fernando
- (Spain) Jorge de Frutos
- (Spain) Ricardo Gallego
- (Spain) Borja García
- (Spain) Dani García
- (Spain) Fran García
- (Spain) Gonzalo García
- (Spain) Javi García
- (Spain) José García Calvo
- (Spain) Luis García
- (Spain) Rafael García
- (Spain) José Aurelio Gay
- (Spain) Gerardo
- (Spain) César Gómez
- (Spain) Adrián González
- (Spain) Esteban Granero
- (Spain) Javi Guerrero
- (Spain) Guti
- (Spain) Miguel Gutiérrez
- (Spain) Pepe Heredia
- (Spain) Mario Hermoso
- (Spain) Luis Hernández
- (Spain) Isidro
- (Spain) Jesé
- (Spain) Joselu
- (Spain) José María López
- (Spain) Juanfran Moreno
- (Spain) Juanfran Torres
- (Spain) Juanjo
- (Spain) Juankar
- (Spain) Juanmi
- (Spain) José Manuel Jurado
- (Spain) Ángel Lanchas
- (Spain) Diego Llorente
- (Spain) Julio Llorente
- (Spain) Marcos Llorente
- (Spain) Julen Lopetegui
- (Spain) Diego López
- (Spain) José Alberto López
- (Spain) Sebastián Losada
- (Spain) Enrique Magdaleno
- (Spain) Juan Maqueda
- (Spain) Alberto Marcos
- (Spain) Ángel Martín González
- (Spain) Rafael Martín Vázquez
- (Spain) Juan Mata
- (Spain) Javier Maté
- (Spain) Borja Mayoral
- (Spain) Gonzalo Melero
- (Spain) Míchel
- (Spain) Mista
- (Spain) Fernando Morán
- (Spain) Álvaro Morata
- (Spain) Rodrigo Moreno
- (Spain) Juan Morgado
- (Spain) Pedro Mosquera
- (Spain) Víctor Muñoz
- (Spain) Nacho
- (Spain) César Navas
- (Spain) Álvaro Negredo
- (Spain) José Ochotorena
- (Spain) Antolín Ortega
- (Spain) Fernando Pacheco
- (Spain) Miguel Pardeza
- (Spain) Javier Paredes
- (Spain) Dani Parejo
- (Spain) Paco Pavón
- (Spain) Óscar Plano
- (Spain) Ángel Pérez
- (Spain) Alfonso Pérez
- (Spain) Francisco Pineda
- (Spain) Javier Portillo
- (Spain) Quini
- (Spain) Luis Miguel Ramis
- (Spain) Jacobo Ramón
- (Spain) Raúl
- (Spain) Rubén de la Red
- (Spain) Sergio Reguilón
- (Spain) Fran Rico
- (Spain) Riki
- (Spain) Alberto Rivera
- (Spain) Ángel Rodríguez
- (Spain) Francis Rodríguez
- (Spain) Óscar Rodríguez
- (Spain) Rubén
- (Spain) Andrés Sabido
- (Spain) José Antonio Salguero
- (Spain) Jaime Sánchez
- (Spain) Sergio Sánchez
- (Spain) Víctor Sánchez
- (Spain) Manolo Sanchís
- (Spain) Sandro
- (Spain) Isidoro San José
- (Spain) José Luis Santamaría
- (Spain) Fernando Sanz
- (Spain) Pablo Sarabia
- (Spain) Rubén Sobrino
- (Spain) Jesús Solana
- (Spain) Roberto Soldado
- (Spain) Raúl de Tomás
- (Spain) Javier Torres Gómez
- (Spain) Miguel Torres
- (Spain) Víctor Torres Mestre
- (Spain) Lucas Torró
- (Spain) Roberto Trashorras
- (Spain) Ismael Urzaiz
- (Spain) Vicente Valcarce
- (Spain) Borja Valero
- (Spain) Lucas Vázquez
- (Spain) Jesús Velasco
- (Spain) Víctor
- (Uruguay) Leandro Cabrera
- (Uruguay) Federico Valverde
- (Uruguay) Guillermo Varela
- (Venezuela) Julio Álvarez
- (Venezuela) Jonay Hernández

== See also ==
- La Fábrica (Real Madrid)
- Real Madrid C
- Real Madrid Juvenil
