= 1995–96 Segunda División B =

Segunda División B
- Season: 1995–96
- Promoted: Las Palmas; Ourense; Atlético Madrid B Levante
- Relegated: San Sebastián de los Reyes; Tenerife B Móstoles; Santa Ana; Tudelano; Durango; Palencia; Amurrio; Alcoyano; Ontinyent; Barcelona C Andorra CF; Mármol Macael; Novelda; Lorca; Utrera; Leganés B
- Top goalscorer: Estefan Juliá (23 goals)
- Best goalkeeper: Manolo López (0.55 goals)
- Biggest home win: Gramenet 9–1 Andorra (21 April 1996); As Pontes 8–0 Moscardó (3 December 1995)
- Biggest away win: Gáldar 0–5 Las Palmas (3 September 1995); Leganés B 8–0 Talavera (24 March 1996); Beasain 0–5 Cultural Leonesa (8 October 1995); Sant Andreu 0–5 Gramenet (10 December 1995); Utrera 0–5 Jaén (10 December 1995); Móstoles 0–5 Atlético Madrid B (7 April 1996)
- Highest scoring: Gramenet 9–1 Andorra (21 April 1996); Mallorca B 7–3 Sant Andreu (17 September 1995)

The season 1995–96 of Segunda División B of Spanish football started August 1995 and ended May 1996.

== Summary before the 1995–96 season ==
Playoffs de Ascenso:

- Racing de Ferrol
- Mensajero
- Las Palmas
- Pontevedra
- Alavés (P)
- Numancia
- Sestao (P)
- Beasain
- Levante
- Gramenet
- Valencia B
- Castellón
- Córdoba
- Almería (P)
- Écija (P)
- Jaén

Relegated from Segunda División:

- Orense
- Palamós (relegated to Tercera División)

Promoted from Tercera División:

- Deportivo La Coruña B (from Group 1)
- As Pontes (from Group 1)
- Durango (from Group 4)
- Aurrerá (from Group 4)
- Barcelona C (from Group 5)
- Espanyol B (from Group 5)
- Novelda (from Group 6)
- Santa Ana (from Group 7)
- Cultural Leonesa (from Group 8)
- San Pedro (from Group 9)
- Málaga (from Group 9)
- Vélez (from Group 9)
- Utrera (from Group 10)
- Mallorca B (from Group 11)
- Salud Tenerife (from Group 9) (renamed as CD Tenerife B from 1995 to 1996 season)
- Huesca (from Group 16)
- Andorra (from Group 16)

Relegated:

- Real Oviedo B
- Real Ávila
- Corralejo
- Realejos
- Gimnástica de Torrelavega
- Zaragoza B
- Gernika
- Hullera Vasco-Leonesa
- Murcia
- Girona
- Europa
- Premià
- San Fernando
- San Roque de Lepe
- Cacereño
- Manchego
- Casetas

Administrative relegation:

- Palamós (financial trouble)
- FC Cartagena (financial trouble)

Occupied the vacant spots by administrative relegations:

- Gavà (occupied the vacant spot of Palamós)
- Lorca (occupied the vacant spot of FC Cartagena)

Occupied the vacant spots by Segunda División free spots due to Primera División expansion:

- Leganés B (occupied the vacant spot of Leganés)
- Gáldar (occupied the vacant spot of Getafe)

== Group I ==
Teams from Canary Islands, Castilla–La Mancha, Community of Madrid and Galicia.

=== Teams ===
Location of teams in Segunda División B Gr. 1 1995–96
Canary Islands

Team	Founded	Home city	Stadium
Aranjuez	1948	Aranjuez, Madrid	El Deleite
As Pontes	1960	As Pontes de García Rodríguez, Galicia	O Poboado
Atlético Madrid B	1969	Madrid	Vallecas / Comunidad de Madrid
Deportivo La Coruña B	1914	A Coruña, Galicia	Anexo de Riazor
Fuenlabrada	1975	Fuenlabrada, Madrid	La Aldehuela
Gáldar	1988	Gáldar, Canary Islands	Barrial
Las Palmas	1949	Las Palmas, Canary Islands	Insular
Leganés B	1959	Leganés, Madrid	Luis Rodríguez de Miguel
Lugo	1953	Lugo, Galicia	Anxo Carro
Mensajero	1924	Santa Cruz de La Palma, Canary Islands	Silvestre Carrillo
Moscardó	1945	Usera, Madrid	Román Valero
Móstoles	1955	Móstoles, Madrid	El Soto
Orense	1952	Ourense, Galicia	O Couto
Pontevedra	1941	Pontevedra, Galicia	Pasarón
Racing Ferrol	1919	Ferrol, Galicia	A Malata
Real Madrid C	1952	Madrid, Madrid	Ciudad Deportiva
San Sebastián de los Reyes	1971	San Sebastián de los Reyes, Madrid	Matapiñonera
Santa Ana	1974	Madrid, Madrid	Polideportivo Santa Ana
Talavera	1948	Talavera de la Reina, Castilla–La Mancha	El Prado
Tenerife B	1961	Santa Cruz de Tenerife, Canary Islands	Heliodoro Rodríguez López

=== League table ===
Pos	Team	Pld	W	D	L	GF	GA	GD	Pts	Qualification or relegation
1	Las Palmas	38	23	8	7	80	22	+58	77	Qualification for Play-Off
2	Racing Ferrol	38	21	5	12	59	29	+30	68	Qualification for Play-Off
3	Ourense	38	20	8	10	52	33	+19	68	Qualification for Play-Off
4	Atlético Madrid B	38	19	7	12	58	41	+17	64	Qualification for Play-Off
5	Deportivo de La Coruña B	38	16	16	6	48	35	+13	64	
6	Talavera	38	16	9	13	55	42	+13	57	
7	Mensajero	38	15	12	11	51	47	+4	57	
8	Aranjuez	38	15	12	11	43	37	+6	57	
9	Real Madrid C	38	16	7	15	63	60	+3	55	
10	Lugo	38	14	9	15	46	50	−4	51	
11	Fuenlabrada	38	13	11	14	44	42	+2	50	
12	Pontevedra	38	13	10	15	41	39	+2	49	
13	As Pontes	38	13	9	16	57	66	−9	48	
14	Moscardó	38	13	8	17	45	61	−16	47	
15	Gáldar	38	11	13	14	41	44	−3	46	
16	Leganés B	38	12	9	17	31	50	−19	45	Qualification for Play-out
17	SS Reyes	38	12	7	19	34	58	−24	43	Relegation to 1996–97 Tercera División
18	Tenerife B	38	10	12	16	44	57	−13	42	Relegation to 1996–97 Tercera División
19	Móstoles	38	9	8	21	28	68	−40	35	Relegation to 1996–97 Tercera División
20	Santa Ana	38	5	8	25	30	79	−49	23	Relegation to 1996–97 Tercera División

Source: futbolme
Rules for classification: 1) points; 2) head-to-head points; 3) head-to-head goal difference; 4) head-to-head goals scored; 5) goal difference; 6) number of goals scored.

=== Results ===
Home \ Away	ARA	ASP	ATL	DEP	FUE	GAL	LPA	LEG	LUG	MEN	MSC	MST	ORE	PNT	RFE	RMC	SSR	DSA	TAL	TEN
Aranjuez	—	2–2	2–1	1–3	1–0	0–0	0–3	0–0	1–1	1–1	0–3	2–1	2–0	3–0	1–0	2–0	2–0	1–1	0–0	1–1
As Pontes	1–3	—	1–3	1–5	1–0	4–2	0–1	4–1	0–1	1–0	8–0	4–0	1–0	4–2	4–1	1–1	0–1	2–0	0–0	2–2
Atlético Madrid B	2–1	3–2	—	0–0	1–0	1–0	0–2	0–1	2–1	4–2	1–1	4–1	2–2	1–2	1–1	2–1	0–1	2–0	2–1	3–2
Deportivo B	2–0	1–0	0–0	—	2–1	2–2	0–0	3–0	2–1	3–2	2–1	1–1	0–0	1–0	1–0	1–2	1–1	2–1	1–1	1–0
Fuenlabrada	0–0	1–1	2–1	0–2	—	1–0	0–0	3–1	2–3	1–1	1–0	4–1	1–1	1–0	2–0	1–1	2–2	2–0	3–0	3–2
Gáldar	1–1	8–1	1–1	1–0	1–0	—	0–5	0–0	2–0	1–1	1–0	2–0	2–1	1–0	3–0	2–2	2–2	0–0	3–0	1–1
Las Palmas	3–0	2–0	3–2	3–0	1–1	1–0	—	1–2	4–0	0–0	1–1	4–0	0–1	0–1	1–0	1–2	6–0	7–1	2–0	5–1
Leganés B	1–0	0–3	0–2	0–0	0–0	0–1	0–0	—	1–0	1–0	0–3	0–1	2–2	2–1	0–2	0–3	3–0	2–0	0–5	0–2
Lugo	0–3	0–1	1–1	3–0	1–1	3–1	1–2	2–1	—	3–1	0–0	2–0	0–3	1–1	0–4	3–0	0–0	3–3	0–1	2–2
Mensajero	1–1	0–0	1–0	2–2	2–2	2–0	0–3	0–0	4–2	—	1–1	1–0	2–1	2–1	1–0	2–1	2–0	5–1	2–1	1–1
Moscardó	0–4	1–0	1–0	1–1	0–4	4–1	0–3	2–0	1–0	1–2	—	2–0	2–0	0–2	0–4	0–1	2–2	2–1	1–2	3–0
Móstoles	0–2	3–1	0–5	2–0	1–0	1–1	0–4	0–1	0–2	3–2	3–3	—	1–0	0–0	0–0	0–0	1–0	2–2	0–0	2–1
Orense	1–0	2–0	1–0	1–0	1–0	1–0	1–1	0–0	0–2	2–0	3–2	3–1	—	3–1	0–0	4–1	0–1	3–0	2–1	4–1
Pontevedra	2–0	1–0	2–3	2–3	4–0	0–0	1–0	0–2	0–1	0–0	0–0	2–0	1–2	—	2–1	0–1	3–1	4–1	1–1	0–0
Racing Ferrol	0–1	1–0	1–0	1–1	4–0	3–0	2–1	2–1	0–1	1–4	3–0	2–0	1–0	0–0	—	3–0	1–0	4–0	4–1	4–0
Real Madrid C	1–3	2–2	1–2	0–0	1–2	2–0	3–4	3–2	1–2	2–0	3–1	3–0	2–4	1–1	2–1	—	1–2	4–2	3–2	3–1
SS Reyes	1–0	1–3	1–3	1–1	2–1	2–1	0–0	0–3	1–0	2–0	1–2	2–1	1–2	1–0	1–2	0–3	—	2–3	0–3	0–1
Santa Ana	1–2	1–1	2–0	1–2	0–2	1–0	0–1	0–3	2–1	0–1	0–2	0–2	0–0	1–1	0–4	2–1	0–1	—	0–2	0–0
Talavera	3–0	3–0	0–1	1–1	1–0	0–0	2–1	1–1	1–2	3–1	4–1	3–0	0–1	1–2	0–1	3–2	1–0	4–2	—	2–2
Tenerife B	0–0	1–1	0–2	1–1	2–0	1–0	0–4	4–0	1–1	1–2	2–1	3–0	2–0	0–1	0–1	2–3	2–1	2–1	0–1	—

Source: BDFútbol
Legend: Blue = home team win; Yellow = draw; Red = away team win.

=== Top goalscorers ===
Goalscorers	Goals	Team
(Spain) Javi Guerrero	21	Real Madrid C
(Spain) Arturo Patiño	21	As Pontes
(Spain) Eloy Jiménez	19	Las Palmas
(Spain) Chili	17	Las Palmas
(Spain) Javi Prendes	17	Racing de Ferrol

=== Top goalkeepers ===
Goalkeeper	Goals	Matches	Average	Team
(Spain) Manolo López	18	33	0.55	Las Palmas
(Spain) Luis César Sampedro	18	29	0.62	Racing de Ferrol
(Spain) Álex Sánchez	22	30	0.73	Deportivo de La Coruña B
(Spain) Manuel Ares	30	35	0.86	Ourense
(Spain) Carlos Gaitán	37	38	0.97	Aranjuez

== Group II ==
Teams from Asturias, Basque Country, Castile and León, La Rioja and Navarre.

=== Teams ===
Location of teams in Segunda División B Gr. 2 1995–96

Team	Founded	Home city	Stadium
Amurrio	1949	Amurrio, Basque Country	Basarte
Aurrerá Vitoria	1935	Vitoria, Basque Country	Olanrabe
Real Avilés Industrial	1903	Avilés, Asturias	Román Sánchez Puerta
Barakaldo	1917	Barakaldo, Basque Country	Lasesarre
Beasain	1905	Beasain, Basque Country	Loinaz
Bermeo	1950	Bermeo, Basque Country	Itxas Gane
Cultural Leonesa	1923	León, Castile and León	Antonio Amilvia
Durango	1919	Durango, Basque Country	Tabira
Izarra	1924	Estella-Lizarra, Navarre	Merkatondoa
Langreo	1961	Langreo, Asturias	Ganzábal
Lemona	1923	Lemoa, Basque Country	Arlonagusia
Logroñés B	1950	Logroño, La Rioja	Las Gaunas
Numancia	1945	Soria, Castile and León	Los Pajaritos
Osasuna B	1962	Aranguren, Navarre	Tajonar
Palencia	1975	Palencia, Castile and León	La Balastera
Real Sociedad B	1951	San Sebastián, Basque Country	Anoeta
Real Unión	1915	Irun, Basque Country	Stadium Gal
Sporting Gijón B	1960	Gijón, Asturias	Mareo
Tudelano	1935	Tudela, Navarre	Ciudad de Tudela
Valladolid B	1942	Valladolid, Castile and León	Anexo José Zorrilla

=== League Table ===
Pos	Team	Pld	W	D	L	GF	GA	GD	Pts	Qualification or relegation
1	Sporting de Gijón B	38	21	7	10	52	36	+16	70	Qualification for Play-Off
2	Osasuna B	38	17	15	6	41	22	+19	66	Qualification for Play-Off
3	Real Avilés Industrial	38	17	15	6	45	38	+7	66	Qualification for Play-Off
4	Cultural Leonesa	38	18	11	9	68	35	+33	65	Qualification for Play-Off
5	Real Unión	38	16	15	7	49	34	+15	63	
6	Valladolid B	38	16	9	13	43	38	+5	57	
7	Barakaldo	38	14	14	10	46	34	+12	56	
8	Numancia	38	14	14	10	43	36	+7	56	
9	Aurrerá	38	14	11	13	39	43	−4	53	
10	Langreo	38	13	12	13	38	42	−4	51	
11	Bermeo	38	14	9	15	41	40	+1	51	
12	Izarra	38	12	12	14	29	36	−7	48	
13	Real Sociedad B	38	13	8	17	37	41	−4	47	
14	Lemona	38	11	13	14	35	39	−4	46	
15	Beasain	38	9	15	14	35	46	−11	42	
16	Logroñés B	38	9	12	17	40	53	−13	39	Qualification for Play-out
17	Tudelano	38	8	14	16	35	51	−16	38	Relegation to 1996–97 Tercera División
18	Durango	38	6	17	15	40	61	−21	35	Relegation to 1996–97 Tercera División
19	Palencia	38	8	11	19	32	45	−13	35	Relegation to 1996–97 Tercera División
20	Amurrio	38	8	10	20	48	66	−18	34	Relegation to 1996–97 Tercera División

Source: futbolme
Rules for classification: 1) points; 2) head-to-head points; 3) head-to-head goal difference; 4) head-to-head goals scored; 5) goal difference; 6) number of goals scored.

=== Results ===
Home \ Away	AMU	AUR	AVI	BAR	BEA	BER	CUL	DUR	IZA	LAN	LEM	LOG	NUM	OSA	PAL	RSO	RUN	SPG	TUD	VLD
Amurrio	—	0–3	1–1	0–0	4–0	0–1	1–2	4–1	2–4	2–2	1–2	3–1	1–1	0–2	1–1	2–1	1–5	1–2	1–2	1–2
Aurrerá Vitoria	2–1	—	1–1	1–0	2–1	2–0	2–2	3–0	1–1	1–0	1–1	0–0	0–0	1–2	0–0	3–1	1–1	0–1	1–0	0–1
Real Avilés Ind.	2–0	0–0	—	2–0	2–1	1–0	0–0	1–4	2–1	1–0	1–2	3–0	2–1	0–0	1–1	2–1	2–2	1–0	4–3	1–1
Barakaldo	2–1	2–0	0–0	—	0–0	1–3	0–0	4–0	2–0	5–0	1–1	2–1	2–0	1–0	1–1	0–1	2–2	3–0	0–0	1–1
Beasain	2–1	3–1	0–0	3–0	—	0–0	0–5	2–2	4–0	0–0	1–0	2–0	0–0	1–1	3–3	1–2	1–1	1–1	1–1	2–0
Bermeo	0–0	2–1	3–0	3–5	2–0	—	0–2	2–0	0–1	1–1	1–0	1–0	1–0	0–0	3–0	0–0	0–2	1–3	1–1	1–0
Cultural Leonesa	1–2	2–0	3–1	0–0	2–1	4–3	—	1–2	2–0	5–1	1–2	2–0	2–0	0–1	2–0	1–1	1–1	0–1	7–0	0–1
Durango	1–1	0–0	1–2	1–1	1–2	2–2	2–2	—	1–2	1–1	0–1	1–3	1–2	1–1	2–2	0–2	3–2	1–1	2–2	2–0
Izarra	3–5	0–1	0–1	1–0	1–1	1–0	0–0	1–1	—	0–0	1–1	2–0	0–0	2–1	2–1	1–0	1–0	1–0	0–0	0–0
Langreo	2–0	2–3	1–1	3–1	0–1	1–0	1–1	1–0	1–0	—	2–1	2–0	1–3	0–2	0–1	1–2	2–1	1–1	1–0	0–0
Lemona	1–2	2–0	0–1	2–2	1–1	0–0	0–1	1–1	0–0	1–2	—	2–1	1–1	1–2	2–1	0–2	1–1	2–1	1–2	1–0
Logroñés B	2–2	1–3	2–2	1–3	0–0	0–2	2–1	1–1	0–2	0–0	3–1	—	1–0	2–2	1–0	5–1	1–3	4–1	2–2	0–0
Numancia	2–0	3–0	0–0	1–0	1–0	1–2	4–5	2–1	2–0	1–1	0–1	1–1	—	1–1	2–1	2–1	3–1	0–0	0–1	0–0
Osasuna B	0–0	4–0	0–0	2–1	1–0	1–0	1–1	3–1	1–0	1–0	0–0	2–0	1–1	—	1–0	1–1	1–2	0–1	3–0	0–0
Palencia	2–1	3–1	2–2	0–0	3–0	0–1	0–2	0–1	1–0	0–1	0–0	0–1	1–1	0–1	—	0–1	0–1	2–1	2–3	2–1
Real Sociedad B	1–2	1–1	0–1	3–1	2–0	2–2	0–2	0–1	0–0	0–2	0–1	0–2	3–1	0–1	0–0	—	2–0	0–0	3–0	0–1
Real Unión	2–0	3–0	2–0	0–0	1–0	2–1	3–2	1–1	2–1	0–2	0–0	0–0	0–0	0–0	2–1	1–0	—	2–1	1–0	0–1
Sporting B	3–2	1–0	4–1	0–1	2–0	2–1	1–0	5–0	0–0	2–1	2–1	1–0	1–2	2–1	2–0	0–2	0–0	—	2–1	2–1
Tudelano	1–1	0–1	0–1	0–1	0–0	2–1	0–0	0–0	2–0	1–1	1–0	1–1	1–2	0–0	0–1	0–1	1–1	1–2	—	4–0
Valladolid B	4–1	1–2	1–2	0–1	3–0	2–0	1–4	0–0	1–0	2–1	2–1	2–1	1–2	2–0	1–0	3–0	1–1	1–3	5–2	—

Source: BDFútbol
Legend: Blue = home team win; Yellow = draw; Red = away team win.

=== Top goalscorers ===
Goalscorers	Goals	Team
(Spain) Luisito Míguez	18	Palencia
(Spain) Kaiku	16	Amurrio
(Spain) Carolo	15	Cultural Leonesa
(Spain) Javi de Campo	14	Cultural Leonesa
(Spain) José Luis Peña	14	Barakaldo

=== Top goalkeepers ===
Goalkeeper	Goals	Matches	Average	Team
(Spain) Juan Carlos López	29	35	0.83	Cultural Leonesa
(Spain) Alfonso Núñez	31	37	0.84	Izarra
(Spain) Juanjo González	26	30	0.87	Sporting de Gijón B
(Spain) Álvaro Iglesias	32	36	0.89	Barakaldo
(Spain) Josu Urcelay	32	35	0.91	Real Unión

== Group III ==
Teams from Andorra, Aragon, Balearic Islands, Catalonia and Valencian Community.

=== Teams ===
Location of teams in Segunda División B Gr. 3 1995–96

Team	Founded	Home city	Stadium
Alcoyano	1928	Alcoy, Valencian Community	El Collao
Andorra CF	1956	Andorra, Aragon	Juan Antonio Endeiza
FC Andorra	1942	Andorra la Vella, Andorra	Comunal
Barcelona C	1967	Barcelona, Catalonia	Mini Estadi
Castellón	1922	Castellón de la Plana, Valencian Community	Nou Castàlia
Espanyol B	1994	Barcelona, Catalonia	Sarrià
Figueres	1919	Figueres, Catalonia	Vilatenim
Gavà	1929	Gavà, Catalonia	La Bòbila
Gimnàstic de Tarragona	1886	Tarragona, Catalonia	Nou Estadi Tarragona
Gramenet	1994	Santa Coloma de Gramenet, Catalonia	Nou Camp Municipal
Hospitalet	1957	L'Hospitalet de Llobregat, Catalonia	Municipal de Deportes
Huesca	1960	Huesca, Aragon	El Alcoraz
Levante	1909	Valencia, Valencian Community	Nou Estadi Llevant
Mallorca B	1967	Palma de Mallorca, Balearic Islands	Miguel Nadal
Manlleu	1933	Manlleu, Catalonia	Municipal
Ontinyent	1931	Ontinyent, Valencian Community	El Clariano
Sabadell	1903	Sabadell, Catalonia	Nova Creu Alta
Sant Andreu	1909	Barcelona, Catalonia	Narcís Sala
Terrassa	1906	Terrassa, Catalonia	Olímpic de Terrassa
Valencia B	1944	Valencia, Valencian Community	Ciudad Deportiva de Paterna

=== League Table ===
Pos	Team	Pld	W	D	L	GF	GA	GD	Pts	Qualification or relegation
1	Levante	38	24	10	4	68	25	+43	82	Qualification for Play-Off
2	Gimnàstic	38	20	9	9	72	44	+28	69	Qualification for Play-Off
3	Figueres	38	17	14	7	63	41	+22	65	Qualification for Play-Off
4	Valencia B	38	18	10	10	70	40	+30	64	Qualification for Play-Off
5	Terrassa	38	17	12	9	69	45	+24	63	
6	Castellón	38	17	8	13	40	34	+6	59	
7	Gavà	38	16	8	14	63	52	+11	56	
8	Gramenet	38	15	9	14	62	52	+10	54	
9	FC Andorra	38	14	9	15	38	44	−6	51	
10	Manlleu	38	14	8	16	47	55	−8	50	
11	Espanyol B	38	13	10	15	43	45	−2	49	
12	Sant Andreu	38	12	13	13	51	58	−7	49	
13	L'Hospitalet	38	12	11	15	41	58	−17	47	
14	Mallorca B	38	12	8	18	58	70	−12	44	
15	Huesca	38	11	10	17	40	50	−10	43	
16	Sabadell	38	10	12	16	38	50	−12	42	Qualification for Play-out
17	Alcoyano	38	11	9	18	39	60	−21	42	Relegation to 1996–97 Tercera División
18	Ontinyent	38	10	11	17	41	53	−12	41	Relegation to 1996–97 Tercera División
19	FC Barcelona C	38	10	7	21	49	84	−35	37	Relegation to 1996–97 Tercera División
20	Andorra	38	6	14	18	29	61	−32	32	Relegation to 1996–97 Tercera División

Source: futbolme
Rules for classification: 1) points; 2) head-to-head points; 3) head-to-head goal difference; 4) head-to-head goals scored; 5) goal difference; 6) number of goals scored.

=== Results ===
Home \ Away	ALC	ACF	FCA	BAR	CAS	ESP	FIG	GAV	GIM	GRA	HOS	HUE	LEV	MAL	MAN	ONT	SAB	SAN	TER	VAL
Alcoyano	—	1–1	3–0	2–3	0–1	1–1	3–1	0–2	1–0	1–0	1–0	0–1	1–1	1–0	2–4	1–0	2–3	0–1	1–1	2–1
Andorra CF	1–3	—	2–0	2–1	0–0	1–0	0–0	1–1	1–1	2–2	0–1	2–1	3–0	0–0	2–1	0–1	0–1	1–1	2–2	0–1
FC Andorra	0–0	1–0	—	5–1	1–0	1–0	1–1	3–0	1–2	1–0	2–1	0–0	0–1	1–0	1–1	1–1	0–1	2–0	0–0	0–3
Barcelona C	4–1	2–1	0–3	—	1–2	1–3	0–1	1–3	1–4	2–2	1–1	1–2	1–1	3–2	1–0	3–2	3–1	1–1	0–1	0–0
Castellón	2–0	2–0	0–1	1–1	—	0–0	0–1	1–0	1–2	1–1	1–1	1–0	1–0	1–0	0–1	1–0	1–0	1–1	2–0	2–0
Espanyol B	1–2	3–0	1–3	3–0	3–2	—	1–2	1–0	1–0	2–1	1–1	3–1	0–2	1–1	1–0	1–2	3–1	0–0	1–3	0–2
Figueres	1–1	3–0	1–3	3–0	0–1	1–1	—	2–1	4–1	3–0	0–1	4–0	1–1	2–1	1–1	1–1	1–0	1–1	0–0	6–3
Gavà	3–0	3–0	2–0	6–2	2–0	0–0	1–2	—	2–1	2–2	3–1	1–1	1–2	2–2	2–1	6–2	2–0	3–4	1–1	1–2
Gimnàstic	3–0	5–1	1–1	1–0	1–0	2–1	1–1	3–0	—	4–0	2–1	1–0	1–3	3–0	3–0	2–2	2–0	1–3	3–2	1–1
Gramenet	5–1	9–1	2–0	3–0	1–2	1–1	0–0	2–0	0–2	—	1–0	2–1	0–4	1–0	1–0	6–3	2–1	3–2	1–3	1–1
Hospitalet	1–1	3–1	3–0	1–0	2–0	1–0	2–4	1–0	2–2	1–1	—	2–1	1–2	1–4	2–0	0–3	2–2	2–4	1–0	3–2
Huesca	3–1	1–1	1–1	4–0	2–1	1–1	4–0	0–1	0–4	0–1	0–0	—	1–2	2–1	2–1	2–0	2–3	1–1	0–0	1–0
Levante	2–0	3–1	3–2	3–0	3–0	3–0	1–0	1–1	1–1	1–0	5–0	3–1	—	5–1	3–0	2–0	0–0	2–2	1–0	0–1
Mallorca B	3–1	1–1	2–1	4–3	1–3	2–1	2–2	1–1	6–3	3–1	0–0	3–1	1–2	—	2–2	1–0	2–0	7–3	2–1	1–3
Manlleu	2–3	1–0	2–0	3–2	1–1	2–1	1–5	1–2	1–0	1–1	2–0	2–1	0–2	3–0	—	2–0	3–0	0–2	2–2	0–2
Ontinyent	0–0	1–0	0–0	2–5	0–2	1–1	0–1	2–1	0–2	2–0	1–1	3–0	0–1	2–0	0–0	—	0–0	0–0	0–1	1–2
Sabadell	1–1	0–0	0–1	2–2	0–3	3–1	1–1	2–1	2–1	0–3	0–0	0–0	1–1	3–0	0–1	1–3	—	3–1	5–1	0–2
Sant Andreu	1–0	0–0	3–0	0–1	3–1	0–1	1–4	1–3	1–1	0–5	5–1	0–1	1–0	3–0	1–1	2–1	1–1	—	0–3	0–4
Terrassa	3–1	4–0	4–1	1–2	2–2	1–2	3–0	4–0	0–2	1–0	3–0	3–1	1–1	2–1	6–2	3–3	1–0	1–1	—	2–2
Valencia B	3–0	1–1	2–0	7–0	2–0	0–1	2–2	2–3	3–3	3–1	3–0	0–0	0–0	5–1	1–2	1–2	0–0	1–0	2–3	—

Source: BDFútbol
Legend: Blue = home team win; Yellow = draw; Red = away team win.

=== Top goalscorers ===
Goalscorers	Goals	Team
(Spain) Estefan Juliá	23	Sant Andreu
(Spain) Diego Ribera	17	Valencia Mestalla
(Spain) Rafa Rodríguez	16	Gramenet
(Spain) Manolo Moyá	16	Mallorca B
(Spain) Fran Figueroa	15	Gimnàstic

=== Top goalkeepers ===
Goalkeeper	Goals	Matches	Average	Team
(Spain) Rodri	20	30	0.67	Levante
(Spain) Andrés Palop	33	34	0.97	Valencia Mestalla
(Spain) Rodri	40	37	1.08	Figueres
(Spain) Juan Manuel López	37	32	1.16	Terrassa
(Andorra) Koldo Álvarez de Eulate	44	36	1.22	FC Andorra

== Group IV ==
Teams from Andalucia, Melilla, Region of Murcia, Valencian Community.

=== Teams ===
Location of teams in Segunda División B Gr. 4 1995–96

Team	Founded	Home city	Stadium
Polideportivo Almería	1983	Almería, Andalusia	Juan Rojas
Benidorm	1964	Benidorm, Valencian Community	Foietes
Betis B	1962	Seville, Andalusia	Benito Villamarín
Cádiz	1910	Cádiz, Andalusia	Ramón de Carranza
Córdoba	1954	Córdoba, Andalusia	Nuevo Arcángel
Elche	1923	Elche, Valencian Community	Martínez Valero
Granada	1931	Granada, Andalusia	Nuevo Los Cármenes
Real Jaén	1929	Jaén, Andalusia	La Victoria
Lorca	1994	Lorca, Region of Murcia	San José
Málaga	1948	Málaga, Andalusia	La Rosaleda
Mármol Macael	1952	Macael, Andalusia	Ciudad Deportiva de Macael
Melilla	1976	Melilla	Álvarez Claro
Novelda	1925	Novelda, Valencian Community	La Magdalena
Recreativo de Huelva	1889	Huelva, Andalusia	Colombino
San Pedro	1974	San Pedro de Alcántara, Andalusia	Municipal de San Pedro
Sevilla B	1950	Seville, Andalusia	Viejo Nervión
Utrera	1975	Utrera, Andalusia	San Juan Bosco
Vélez	1922	Vélez-Málaga, Andalusia	Vivar Téllez
Xerez	1947	Jerez de la Frontera, Andalusia	Chapín
Yeclano	1950	Yecla, Region of Murcia	La Constitución

=== League Table ===
Pos	Team	Pld	W	D	L	GF	GA	GD	Pts	Qualification or relegation
1	Jaén	38	21	11	6	46	21	+25	74	Qualification for Play-Off
2	Granada	38	21	8	9	55	32	+23	71	Qualification for Play-Off
3	Elche	38	19	12	7	64	44	+20	69	Qualification for Play-Off
4	Córdoba	38	18	14	6	60	38	+22	68	Qualification for Play-Off
5	Málaga	38	19	10	9	49	28	+21	67	
6	Cádiz	38	18	7	13	51	39	+12	61	
7	Sevilla Atlético	38	16	10	12	69	44	+25	58	
8	Recreativo	38	14	12	12	46	40	+6	54	
9	Polideportivo Almería	38	13	13	12	38	32	+6	52	
10	Betis B	38	12	15	11	48	47	+1	51	
11	Xerez	38	14	9	15	51	51	0	51	
12	Melilla	38	12	12	14	50	50	0	48	
13	Yeclano	38	13	7	18	36	47	−11	46	
14	Vélez	38	10	13	15	44	55	−11	43	
15	San Pedro	38	11	10	17	38	61	−23	43	
16	Benidorm	38	10	12	16	33	52	−19	42	Qualification for Play-out
17	Mármol Macael	38	9	15	14	34	49	−15	42	Relegation to 1996–97 Tercera División
18	Novelda	38	10	11	17	32	41	−9	41	Relegation to 1996–97 Tercera División
19	Lorca	38	6	10	22	33	67	−34	28	Relegation to 1996–97 Tercera División
20	Utrera	38	3	11	24	24	63	−39	20	Relegation to 1996–97 Tercera División

Source: futbolme
Rules for classification: 1) points; 2) head-to-head points; 3) head-to-head goal difference; 4) head-to-head goals scored; 5) goal difference; 6) number of goals scored.

=== Results ===
Home \ Away	CPA	BEN	BET	CAD	COR	ELC	GRA	JAE	LOR	MGA	MAM	MEL	NOV	REC	SPE	SEV	UTR	VEL	XER	YEC
Poli Almería	—	0–1	0–2	1–0	0–0	1–1	1–1	0–2	1–1	1–1	1–1	1–0	1–0	3–0	0–1	3–1	2–0	1–1	2–0	1–0
Benidorm	2–1	—	0–0	0–1	1–1	0–3	2–1	0–1	2–0	1–0	1–0	2–2	0–0	0–0	4–0	0–3	1–3	0–1	1–0	3–0
Betis B	2–2	0–0	—	1–1	1–2	1–0	1–2	0–0	2–1	4–0	5–1	0–0	1–1	0–2	0–2	2–1	0–0	2–0	3–2	1–1
Cádiz	1–1	2–0	2–2	—	2–1	0–1	0–3	2–0	1–0	1–2	2–0	1–0	1–0	2–0	4–1	0–1	2–0	2–0	2–1	0–0
Córdoba	1–1	2–2	5–2	3–2	—	1–1	2–0	2–1	3–1	1–1	4–0	1–1	2–0	0–0	2–1	1–1	2–2	4–1	1–0	2–0
Elche	1–0	1–0	1–0	1–1	1–1	—	2–0	0–0	4–2	2–0	3–1	4–0	0–2	4–4	4–0	2–2	3–1	5–2	1–3	2–3
Granada	1–0	3–0	2–2	2–2	0–1	1–1	—	1–1	4–1	1–0	0–1	0–1	1–0	1–0	5–0	2–1	1–0	2–1	1–0	1–1
Jaén	1–0	2–0	1–0	2–1	0–2	0–0	2–1	—	5–0	0–0	1–1	1–1	4–1	1–0	2–1	1–0	1–0	1–1	1–0	0–1
Lorca	3–1	4–1	0–3	2–1	1–2	1–1	1–1	0–2	—	0–2	1–3	1–1	0–0	1–1	1–1	1–3	1–0	1–1	0–2	0–1
Málaga	0–1	2–0	1–0	1–0	0–1	3–0	0–1	0–1	3–2	—	1–0	4–0	1–1	1–1	1–0	3–0	3–0	0–0	2–0	4–1
Mármol Macael	0–3	0–2	0–1	0–3	1–1	2–2	1–1	0–0	2–0	1–0	—	3–2	5–1	0–0	0–2	2–2	2–2	1–0	2–2	0–0
Melilla	1–0	6–0	2–1	0–2	1–1	1–2	0–2	0–1	0–0	3–3	1–0	—	2–0	1–1	5–1	2–1	4–0	1–2	2–1	1–0
Novelda	0–1	1–1	0–2	0–1	3–1	0–2	0–1	0–0	2–0	0–1	0–1	5–2	—	0–0	3–1	1–1	2–0	1–0	1–0	2–0
Recreativo	1–0	2–0	1–1	4–0	1–2	0–1	2–1	1–0	1–0	2–2	0–2	2–2	0–1	—	4–2	2–1	2–1	4–1	0–1	1–0
San Pedro	0–0	1–0	0–0	1–0	1–1	1–2	0–1	2–3	0–1	0–1	1–1	1–0	1–1	2–1	—	2–2	1–1	1–1	2–2	3–1
Sevilla B	2–1	1–1	4–0	0–1	3–1	4–0	1–2	0–0	3–2	1–1	3–0	2–0	3–1	4–0	0–1	—	3–0	3–1	1–1	6–0
Utrera	0–0	1–1	2–2	2–5	0–2	0–1	0–2	0–5	3–0	1–2	0–0	1–1	1–1	0–2	0–1	1–2	—	0–0	1–2	1–0
Vélez	2–2	3–3	1–2	2–2	1–0	2–0	3–4	1–2	0–1	0–1	0–0	2–1	0–0	2–1	3–1	2–2	2–0	—	1–1	2–1
Xerez	0–2	4–1	2–2	3–1	2–1	2–2	0–2	2–0	3–1	0–0	0–0	1–1	2–1	0–3	3–0	3–1	1–0	1–2	—	2–1
Yeclano	1–2	0–0	5–0	1–0	2–0	2–3	1–0	0–1	1–1	0–2	1–0	0–2	1–0	0–0	1–2	1–0	1–0	1–0	6–2	—

Source: BDFútbol
Legend: Blue = home team win; Yellow = draw; Red = away team win.

=== Top goalscorers ===
Goalscorers	Goals	Team
(Spain) Manolo López	21	Córdoba
(Spain) Enric Cuxart	18	Elche
(Spain) Fernando Román	17	Melilla
(Spain) Yordi González	16	Sevilla Atlético
(Spain) Juan Antonio Santaella	16	Sevilla Atlético

=== Top goalkeepers ===
Goalkeeper	Goals	Matches	Average	Team
(Spain) Carlos Gómez	20	36	0.56	Jaén
(Spain) Alex Pinilla	30	36	0.83	Polideportivo Almería
(Spain) Roberto Santamaría	24	28	0.86	Málaga
(Spain) Avelino Viña	29	32	0.91	Córdoba
(Spain) Ángel Férez	33	34	0.97	Cádiz

== Play-offs ==
=== Group A ===
Pos	Team	Pld	W	D	L	GF	GA	GD	Pts	Promotion
1	Levante (P)	6	3	1	2	7	4	+3	10	Promoted to Segunda División
2	Córdoba	6	2	2	2	8	6	+2	8	
3	Avilés	6	2	2	2	8	9	−1	8	
4	Racing Ferrol	6	2	1	3	11	15	−4	7	

Source: futbolme
Rules for classification: 1) points; 2) head-to-head points; 3) head-to-head goal difference; 4) head-to-head goals scored; 5) goal difference; 6) number of goals scored.
(P) Promoted

=== Group B ===
Pos	Team	Pld	W	D	L	GF	GA	GD	Pts	Promotion
1	Las Palmas (P)	6	5	1	0	15	1	+14	16	Promoted to Segunda División
2	Elche	6	2	2	2	11	8	+3	8	
3	Gimnàstic	6	1	2	3	5	11	−6	5	
4	Cultural Leonesa	6	0	3	3	4	15	−11	3	

Source: futbolme
Rules for classification: 1) points; 2) head-to-head points; 3) head-to-head goal difference; 4) head-to-head goals scored; 5) goal difference; 6) number of goals scored.
(P) Promoted

=== Group C ===
Pos	Team	Pld	W	D	L	GF	GA	GD	Pts	Promotion
1	Ourense (P)	6	5	0	1	11	1	+10	15	Promoted to Segunda División
2	Sporting de Gijón B	6	3	1	2	8	9	−1	10	
3	Valencia Mestalla	6	2	1	3	8	11	−3	7	
4	Granada	6	0	2	4	2	8	−6	2	

Source: futbolme
Rules for classification: 1) points; 2) head-to-head points; 3) head-to-head goal difference; 4) head-to-head goals scored; 5) goal difference; 6) number of goals scored.
(P) Promoted

=== Group D ===
Pos	Team	Pld	W	D	L	GF	GA	GD	Pts	Promotion
1	Atlético Madrid B (P)	6	4	1	1	11	7	+4	13	Promoted to Segunda División
2	Figueres	6	2	3	1	5	5	0	9	
3	Osasuna B	6	2	2	2	8	7	+1	8	
4	Jaén	6	0	2	4	2	7	−5	2	

Source: futbolme
Rules for classification: 1) points; 2) head-to-head points; 3) head-to-head goal difference; 4) head-to-head goals scored; 5) goal difference; 6) number of goals scored.
(P) Promoted

== Play-out ==
=== Semifinal ===
Team 1	Agg.	Team 2	1st leg	2nd leg
Benidorm	2–1	Leganés B	2–1	0–0
Logroñés B	4–3	Sabadell	2–2	2–1

=== Final ===
Team 1	Agg.	Team 2	1st leg	2nd leg
Sabadell	3–1	Leganés B	1–1	2–0
