= 1996–97 Écija Balompié season =

Écija Balompié
1996–97 season
- Manager: José Enrique Díaz; Vicente Campillo
- Stadium: Estadio San Pablo
- Segunda División: 20th (relegated)
- Copa del Rey: Second round
- Top goalscorer: League: Alberto Saavedra; Federico Jurado Prieto; Manuel Sousa Montero (3 each); All: Alberto Saavedra; Manuel Sousa Montero (4 each)

The 1996–97 Écija Balompié season was the club's 57th season in existence and the club's second consecutive season in the second division of Spanish football.

== Transfers ==
=== In ===
Pos.	Player	Transferred from	Fee	Date	Source
GK	(Nigeria) Wilfred Agbonavbare	(Spain) Rayo Vallecano		1 July 1996	
FW	(Azerbaijan) Vali Gasimov	(Spain) Albacete		1 July 1996	

== Competitions ==
=== Overview ===
Competition	First match	Last match	Starting round	Record							
Competition	First match	Last match	Starting round	Pld	W	D	L	GF	GA	GD	Win %
Segunda División	September 1996	June 1997	Matchday 1	0	0	0	0	0	0	+0	—
Copa del Rey	September 1996	1996	First round	0	0	0	0	0	0	+0	—
Total				0	0	0	0	0	0	+0	—

Source: Competitions

=== Segunda División ===
==== League table ====
Pos	Team	Pld	W	D	L	GF	GA	GD	Pts	Promotion or relegation
16	CA Osasuna	38	11	11	16	34	42	−8	44	
17	Almería CF	38	9	14	15	40	51	−11	41	Relegated to Segunda División B
18	Real Madrid B	38	11	8	19	40	69	−29	41	Relegated to Segunda División B
19	Barcelona B	38	7	13	18	40	63	−23	34	Relegated to Segunda División B
20	Écija	38	7	9	22	27	64	−37	30	Relegated to Segunda División B

==== Results summary ====
Overall								Home						Away					
Pld	W	D	L	GF	GA	GD	Pts	W	D	L	GF	GA	GD	W	D	L	GF	GA	GD
0	0	0	0	0	0	0	0	0	0	0	0	0	0	0	0	0	0	0	0

Source: BDFutbol

==== Results by round ====
Round	1
Ground	
Result	
Position	

A = Away; H = Home; W = Win; D = Draw; L = Loss

==== Matches ====
1 September 1996 1	Toledo	4–0	Écija	Toledo

8 September 1996 2	Écija	0–1	Almería	Écija
				Stadium: Estadio San Pablo

15 September 1996 3	Leganés	4–1	Écija	Leganés

21 September 1996 4	Écija	0–2	Mérida	Écija
				Stadium: Estadio San Pablo

29 September 1996 5	Albacete	2–0	Écija	Albacete

13 October 1996 6	Écija	1–1	Ourense	Écija
				Stadium: Estadio San Pablo

19 October 1996 7	Las Palmas	2–1	Écija	Las Palmas

26 October 1996 8	Écija	0–2	Real Madrid B	Écija
				Stadium: Estadio San Pablo

3 November 1996 9	Écija	2–0	Osasuna	Écija
				Stadium: Estadio San Pablo

9 November 1996 10	Barcelona B	2–1	Écija	Barcelona

17 November 1996 11	Écija	0–0	Salamanca	Écija
				Stadium: Estadio San Pablo

24 November 1996 12	Villarreal	3–0	Écija	Villarreal

1 December 1996 13	Écija	0–1	Atlético Madrid B	Écija
				Stadium: Estadio San Pablo

8 December 1996 14	Badajoz	1–0	Écija	Badajoz

15 December 1996 15	Écija	0–2	Mallorca	Écija
				Stadium: Estadio San Pablo

22 December 1996 16	Alavés	4–0	Écija	Vitoria-Gasteiz

4 January 1997 17	Écija	0–0	Levante	Écija
				Stadium: Estadio San Pablo

12 January 1997 18	Eibar	3–0	Écija	Eibar

19 January 1997 19	Écija	3–1	Lleida	Écija
				Stadium: Estadio San Pablo

26 January 1997 20	Écija	1–1	Toledo	Écija
				Stadium: Estadio San Pablo

2 February 1997 21	Almería	0–1	Écija	Almería

8 February 1997 22	Écija	2–1	Leganés	Écija
				Stadium: Estadio San Pablo

15 February 1997 23	Mérida	1–1	Écija	Mérida

23 February 1997 24	Écija	0–2	Albacete	Écija
				Stadium: Estadio San Pablo

2 March 1997 25	Ourense	1–3	Écija	Ourense

9 March 1997 26	Écija	0–0	Las Palmas	Écija
				Stadium: Estadio San Pablo

15 March 1997 27	Real Madrid B	2–1	Écija	Madrid

23 March 1997 28	Osasuna	3–0	Écija	Pamplona

29 March 1997 29	Écija	1–1	Barcelona B	Écija
				Stadium: Estadio San Pablo

6 April 1997 30	Salamanca	4–0	Écija	Salamanca

13 April 1997 31	Écija	2–1	Villarreal	Écija
				Stadium: Estadio San Pablo

19 April 1997 32	Atlético Madrid B	1–1	Écija	Madrid

4 May 1997 33	Écija	1–2	Badajoz	Écija
				Stadium: Estadio San Pablo

11 May 1997 34	Mallorca	2–1	Écija	Palma

18 May 1997 35	Écija	1–1	Alavés	Écija
				Stadium: Estadio San Pablo

25 May 1997 36	Levante	0–2	Écija	Valencia

1 June 1997 37	Écija	0–2	Eibar	Écija
				Stadium: Estadio San Pablo

15 June 1997 38	Lleida	4–0	Écija	Lleida

== Statistics ==
=== Goalscorers ===
Rank	Pos	No.	Nat.	Player	Segunda División	Copa del Rey	Total
	FW				0	0	0
	FW				0	0	0
Totals					0	0	0
