= Álvaro Iglesias =

Álvaro Iglesias may refer to:

- Álvaro Iglesias (footballer) (born 1972), Spanish footballer
- Álvaro Iglesias (field hockey) (born 1993), Spanish field hockey player
