= 1996 Segunda División B play-offs =

Spanish football league play-offs

The 1996 Segunda División B play-offs (Playoffs de Ascenso or Promoción de Ascenso) were the final playoffs for promotion from 1995–96 Segunda División B to the 1996–97 Segunda División. The four first placed teams in each of the four Segunda División B groups played the Playoffs de Ascenso and the four last placed teams in Segunda División were relegated to Segunda División B.

The teams play a league of four teams, divided into 4 groups. The champion of each group is promoted to Segunda División.

== Group A ==
=== League table ===
Pos	Team	Pld	W	D	L	GF	GA	GD	Pts	Promotion or relegation
1	Levante UD (P)	6	3	1	2	7	4	+3	10	Promotion to Segunda División
2	Córdoba CF	6	2	2	2	8	6	+2	8	
3	Avilés Industrial	6	2	2	2	8	9	−1	8	
4	Racing Ferrol	6	2	1	3	11	15	−4	7	

Source: arquero-arba
Rules for classification: 1st points; 2nd head-to-head points; 3rd head-to-head goal difference; 4th head-to-head goals scored; 5th goal difference; 6th number of goals scored
(P) Promoted

=== Results ===
Home \ Away	LEV	COR	AVI	RFE
Levante UD		0–0	0–1	2–0
Córdoba CF	0–1		2–0	4–2
Avilés Industrial	0–2	1–1		4–2
Racing Ferrol	3–2	2–1	2–2	

Source: arquero-arba
Legend: Blue = home team win; Yellow = draw; Red = away team win.

== Group B ==
=== League table ===
Pos	Team	Pld	W	D	L	GF	GA	GD	Pts	Promotion or relegation
1	UD Las Palmas (P)	6	5	1	0	15	1	+14	16	Promotion to Segunda División
2	Elche CF	6	2	2	2	11	8	+3	8	
3	Gimnàstic de Tarragona	6	1	2	3	5	11	−6	5	
4	Cultural Leonesa	6	0	3	3	4	15	−11	3	

Source: arquero-arba
Rules for classification: 1st points; 2nd head-to-head points; 3rd head-to-head goal difference; 4th head-to-head goals scored; 5th goal difference; 6th number of goals scored
(P) Promoted

=== Results ===
Home \ Away	LPA	ELC	GTA	CLE
UD Las Palmas		1–1	3–0	2–0
Elche CF	0–4		2–0	7–1
Gimnàstic de Tarragona	0–2	2–1		2–2
Cultural Leonesa	0–3	0–0	1–1	

Source: arquero-arba
Legend: Blue = home team win; Yellow = draw; Red = away team win.

== Group C ==
=== League table ===
Pos	Team	Pld	W	D	L	GF	GA	GD	Pts	Promotion or relegation
1	CD Orense (P)	6	5	0	1	11	1	+10	15	Promotion to Segunda División
2	Sporting Gijón B	6	3	1	2	8	9	−1	10	
3	Valencia CF B	6	2	1	3	8	11	−3	7	
4	Granada CF	6	0	2	4	2	8	−6	2	

Source: arquero-arba
Rules for classification: 1st points; 2nd head-to-head points; 3rd head-to-head goal difference; 4th head-to-head goals scored; 5th goal difference; 6th number of goals scored
(P) Promoted

=== Results ===
Home \ Away	ORE	SPG	VAL	GCF
CD Orense		2–0	1–0	3–0
Sporting Gijón B	1–0		3–5	1–1
Valencia CF B	0–4	1–2		1–0
Granada CF	0–1	0–1	1–1	

Source: arquero-arba
Legend: Blue = home team win; Yellow = draw; Red = away team win.

== Group D ==
=== League table ===
Pos	Team	Pld	W	D	L	GF	GA	GD	Pts	Promotion or relegation
1	Atlético de Madrid B (P)	6	4	1	1	11	7	+4	13	Promotion to Segunda División
2	UE Figueres	6	2	3	1	5	5	0	9	
3	Atlético Osasuna B	6	2	2	2	8	7	+1	8	
4	Real Jaén	6	0	2	4	2	7	−5	2	

Source: arquero-arba
Rules for classification: 1st points; 2nd head-to-head points; 3rd head-to-head goal difference; 4th head-to-head goals scored; 5th goal difference; 6th number of goals scored
(P) Promoted

=== Results ===
Home \ Away	AtmB	FIG	OSA	RJN
Atlético de Madrid B		3–0	1–0	2–0
UE Figueres	0–1		1–1	0–1
Atlético Osasuna B	0–4	1–0		1–2
Real Jaén	1–0	1–1	3–5	

Source: arquero-arba
Legend: Blue = home team win; Yellow = draw; Red = away team win.
