= Real Monasterio de Santa Inés del Valle (Écija) =

Convent in Seville, Andalusia, Spain

Coordinates: 37°32′46″N 5°04′55″W

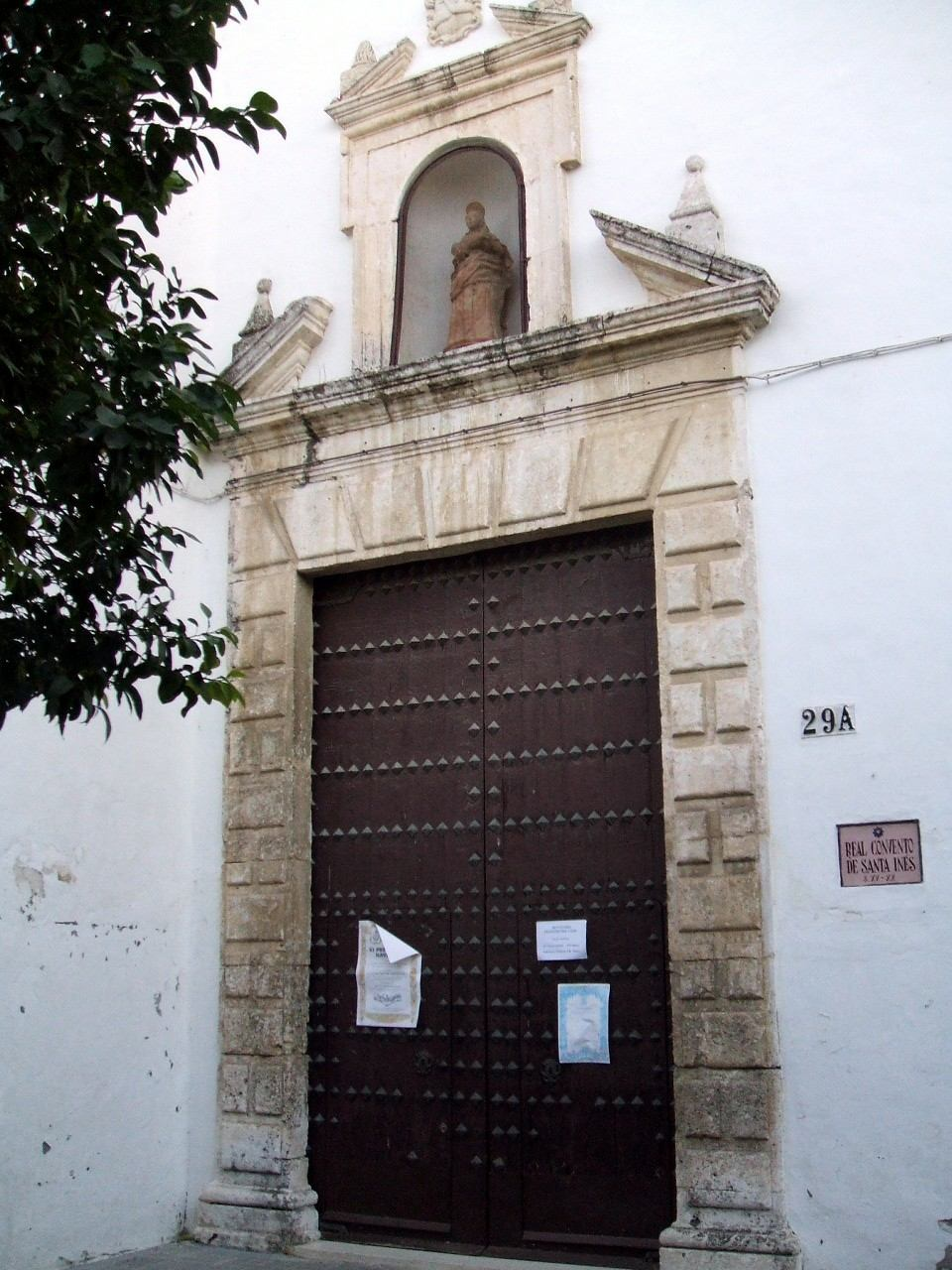
Real Monasterio de Santa Inés del Valle

Real Monasterio de Santa Inés del Valle (Royal Monastery of Saint Agnes of the Valley) is located in Écija, Province of Seville, Spain. The convent is served by Poor Clares. Founded in the late 15th century, its church is designed in Baroque style and dates to the early 17th century. Reports in 2002 stated that the building was in serious disrepair.

== Gallery ==
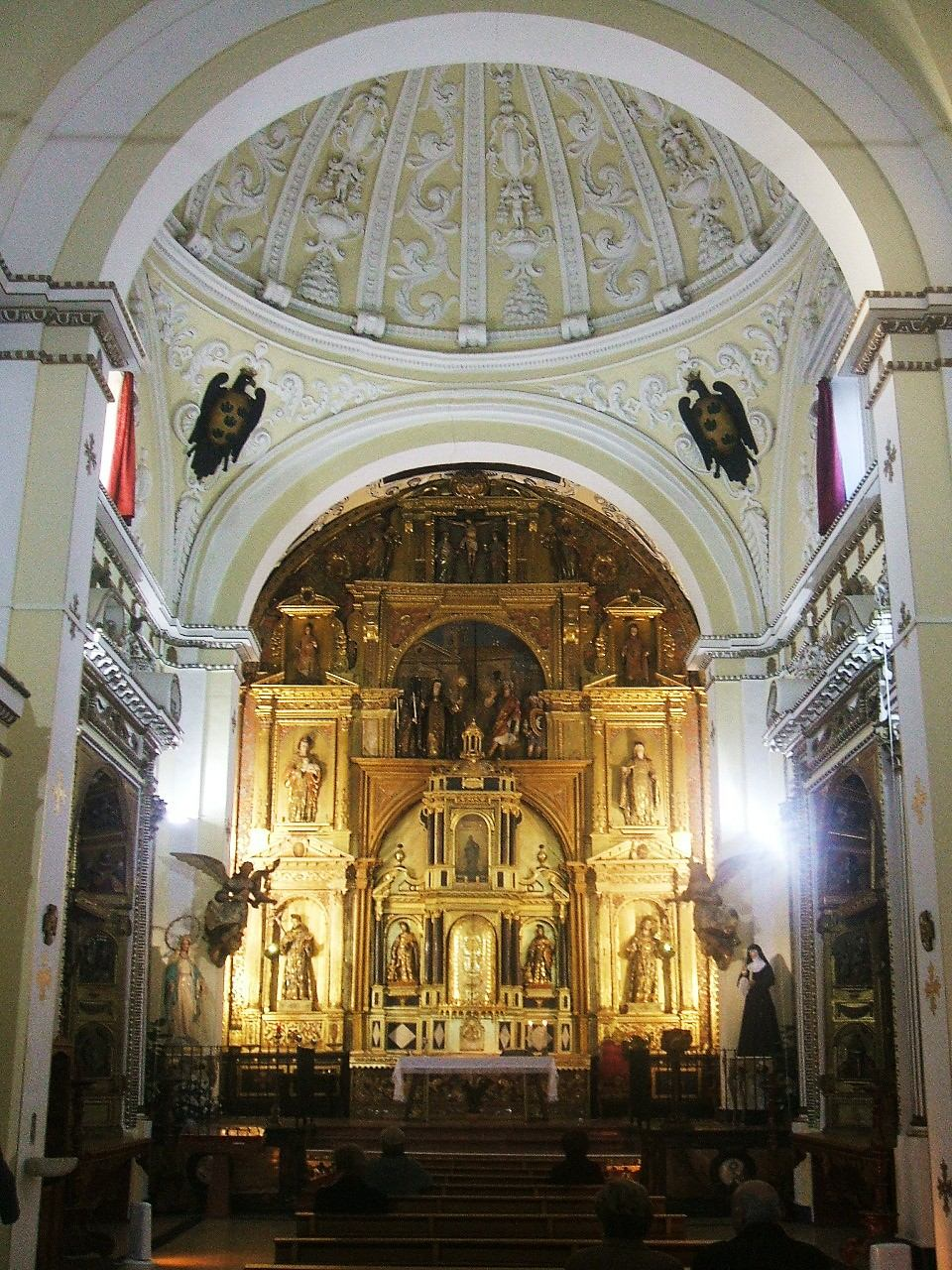
Nave

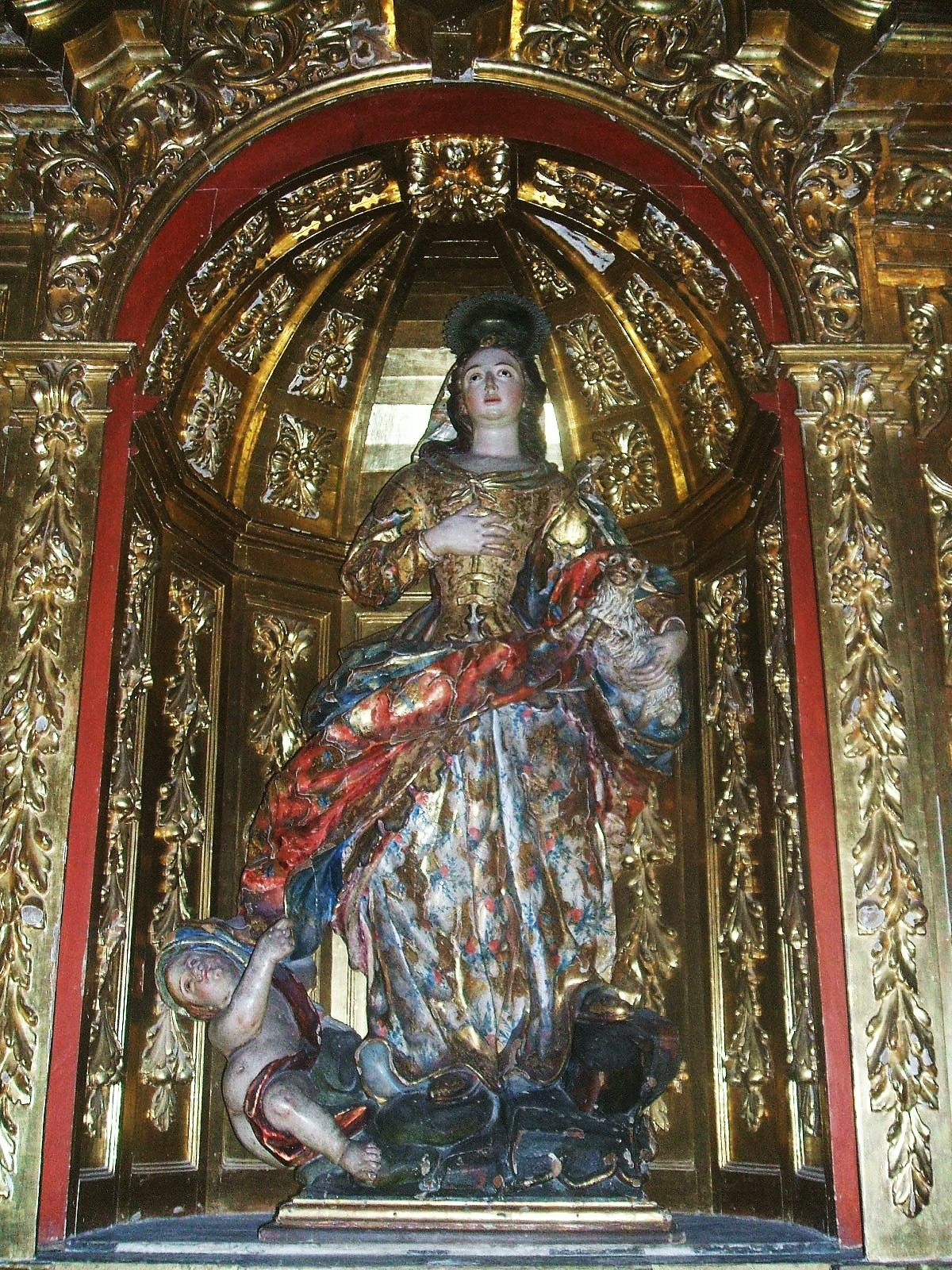
18th century altarpiece of St. Agnes

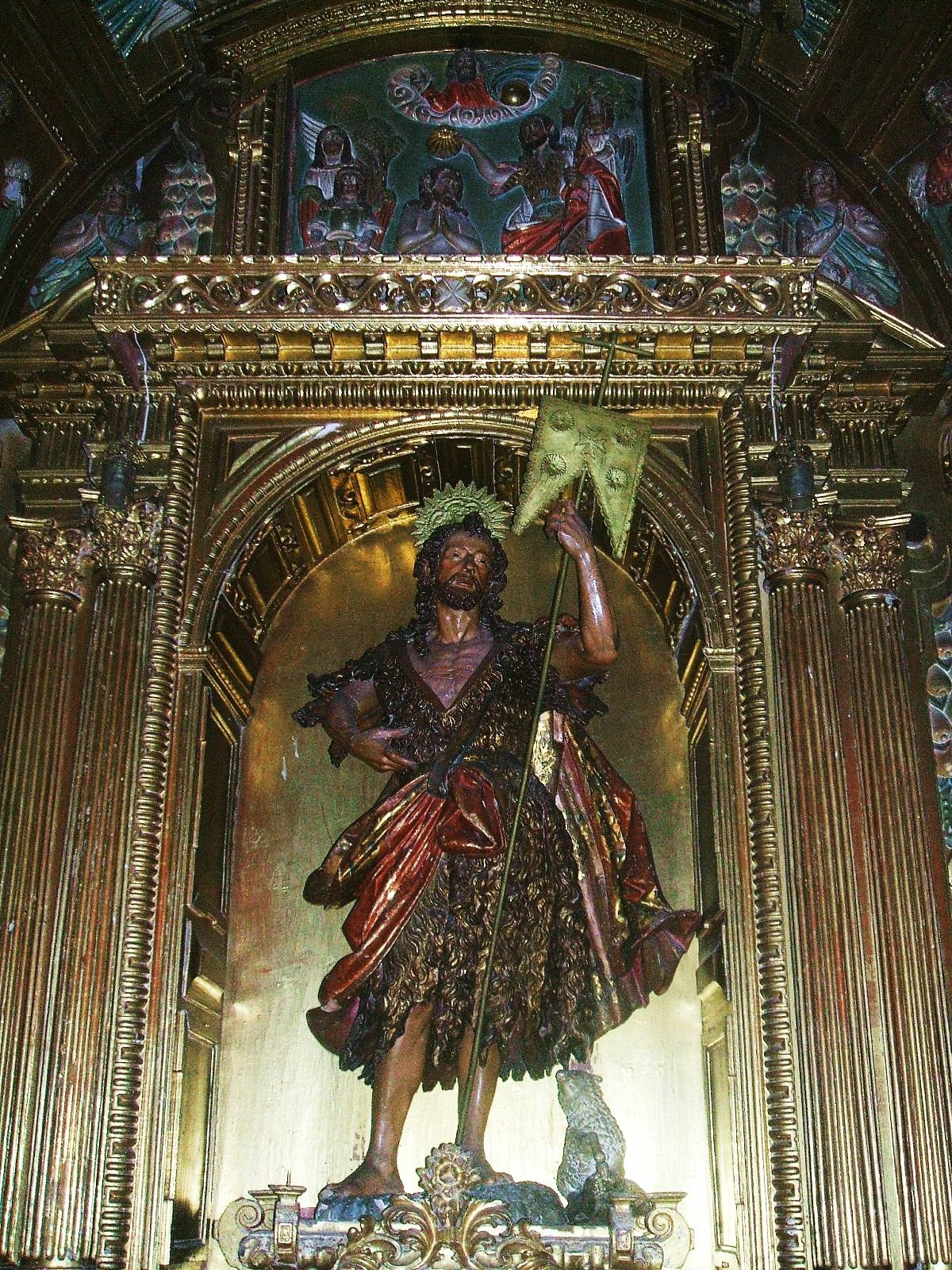
17th century altarpiece of San Juan Bautista

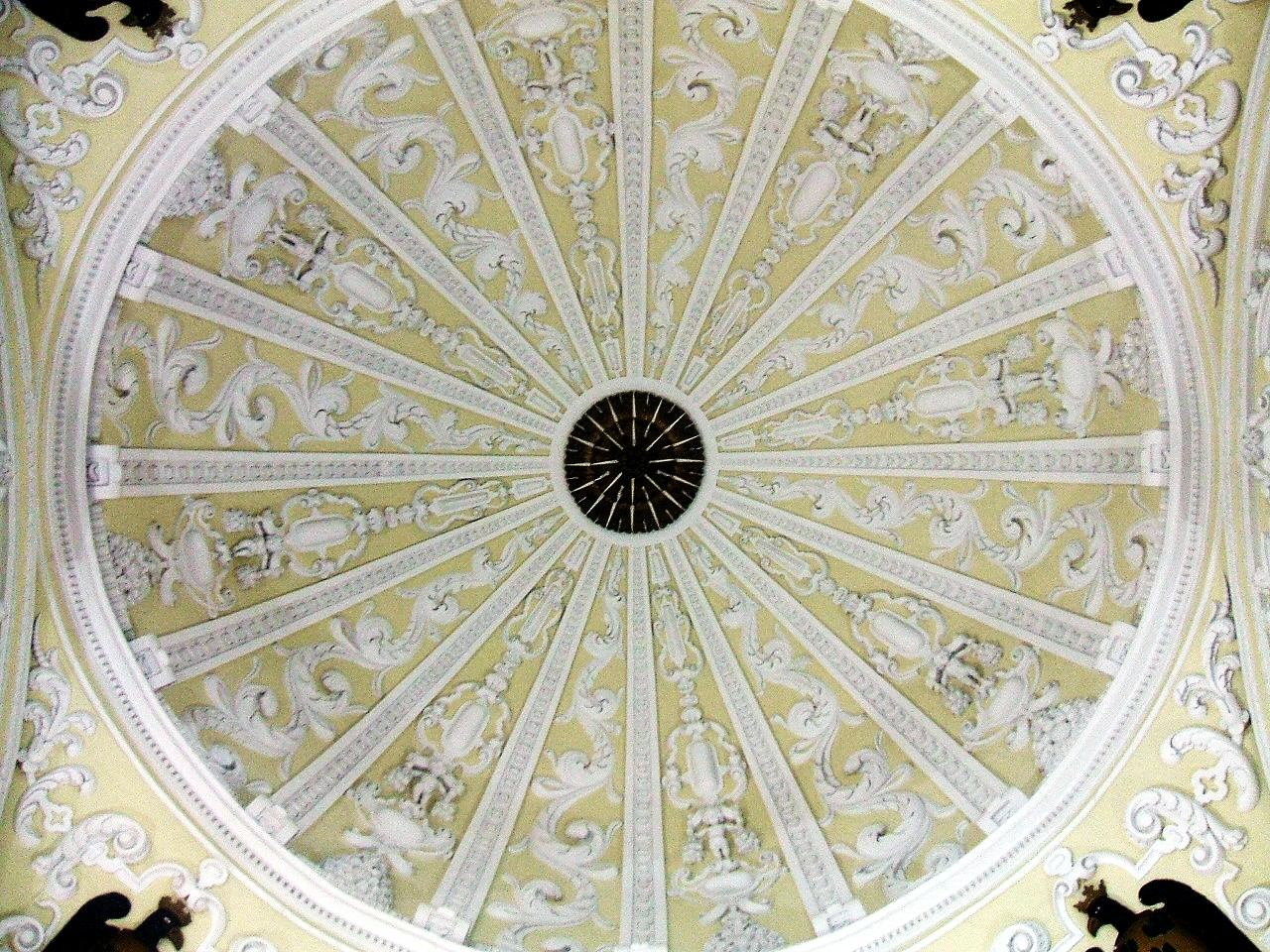
17th century dome of the sacristy
