= Municipal History Museum of Écija =

History and archaeological museum in Écija, Spain

- Museo Histórico Municipal de Écija
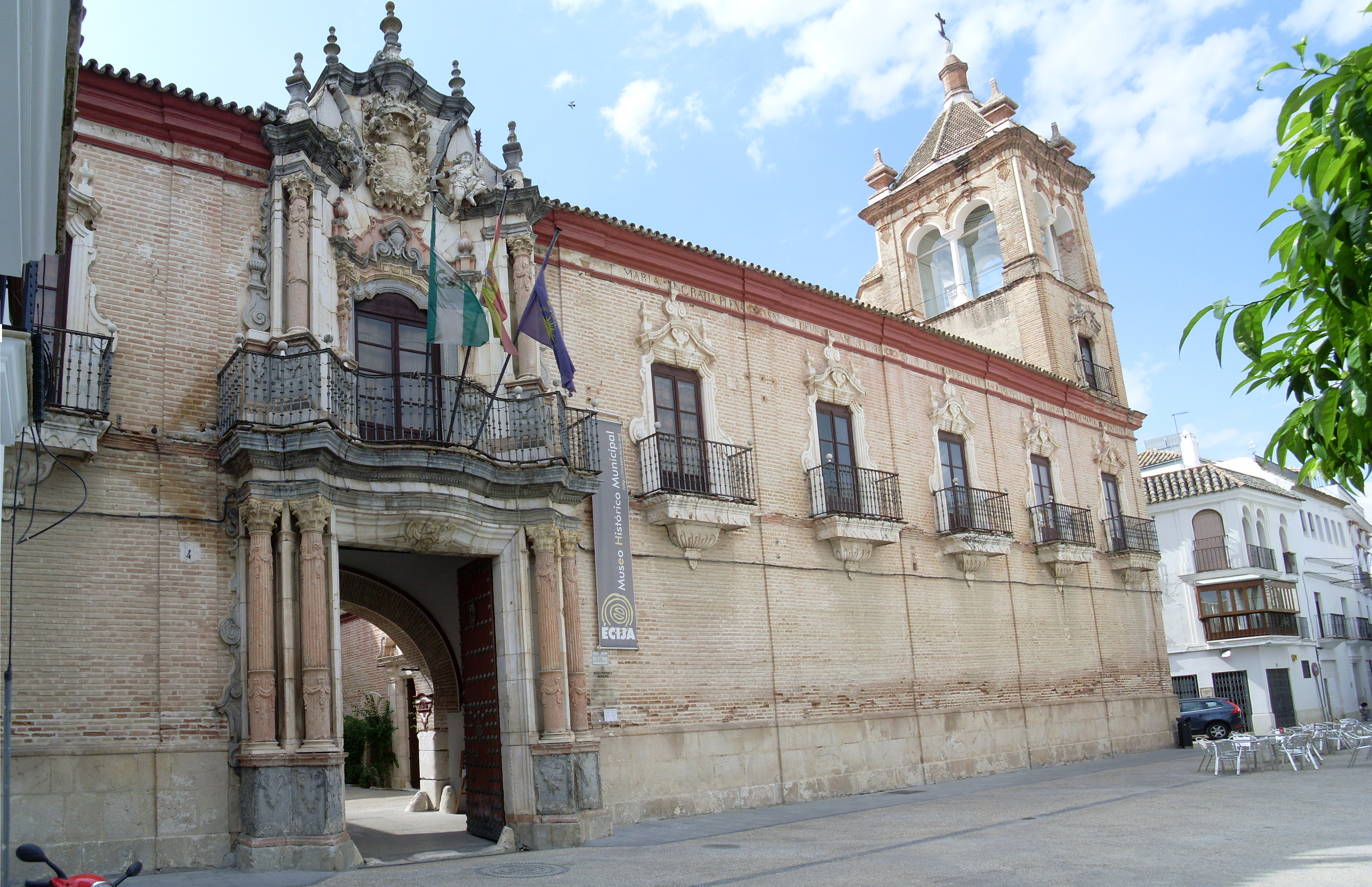
- Established: November 1997
- Location: Plaza de la Constitución, Écija, Spain
- Type: History museum, archaeological museum
- Owner: Ayuntamiento de Écija

Spanish Cultural Heritage
- Official name: Palacio de los Marqueses de Benamejí
- Type: Non-movable
- Criteria: Monument
- Designated: 1994
- Reference no.: RI-51-0008775-00000

The Municipal History Museum of Écija (Spanish: Museo Histórico Municipal de Écija) is a history museum in Écija, Spain, mainly dedicated to archaeology.

== History ==
Hosted at the Benamejí Palace, an instance of the local Baroque architecture, the museum is owned by the municipality and operated by a municipal foundation. It began operation in November 1997. The first archaeology section opened in 1999. The museum joined the regional register of museums of Andalusia in 2000.

== Pieces ==
Among the items exhibited at the museum, standout collections include the set of Roman mosaics from Astigi (one of the largest from Hispania), Roman sculpture (including the iconic wounded amazon), the anthropologic collection from the Late antiquity and the Al-Andalus period, the Roman epigraphy, a number of warrior stelae and the pre-Roman Écija Plaque found in the surrounding campiña.

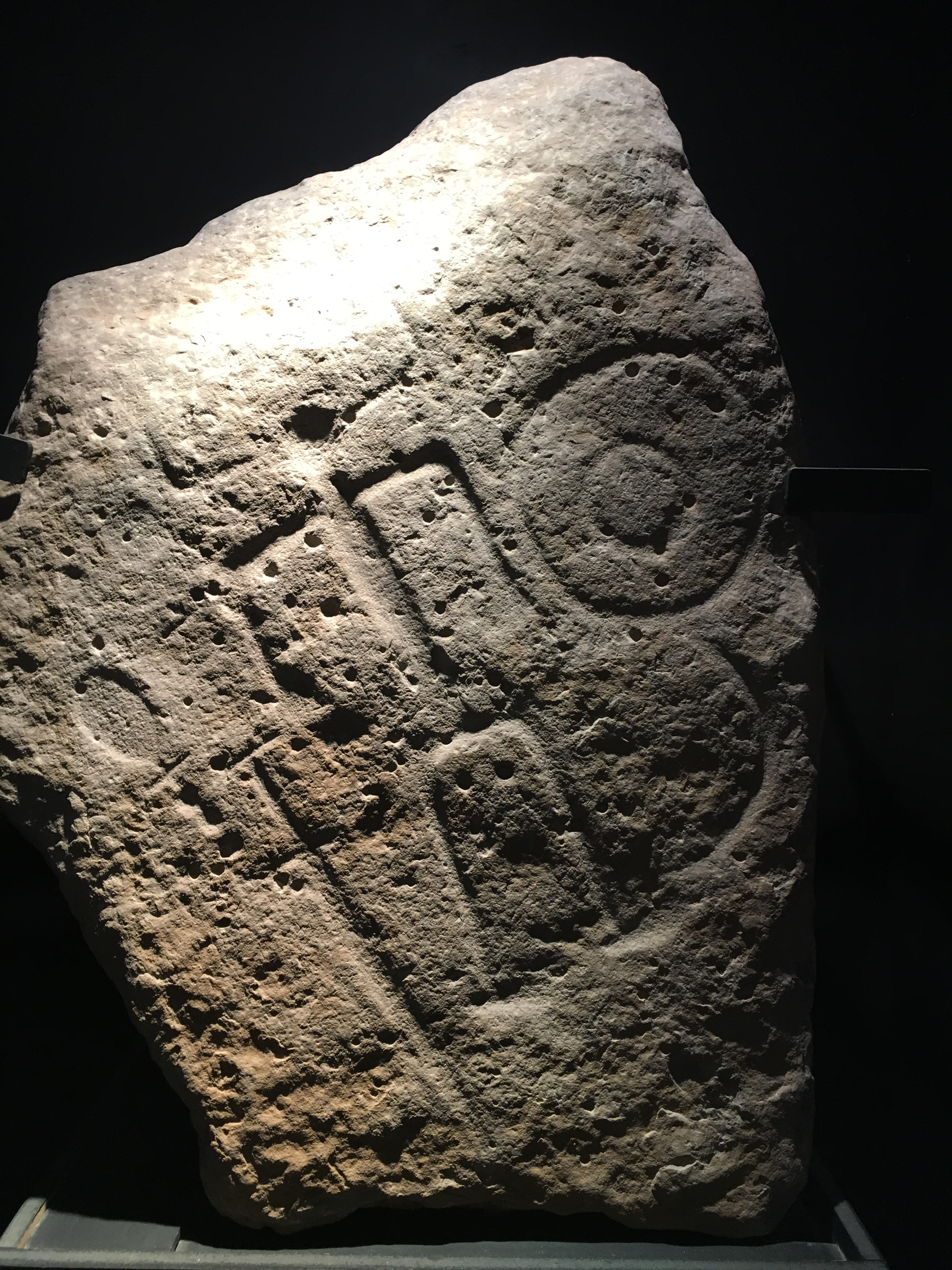
Warrior stele from Atalaya de la Moranilla

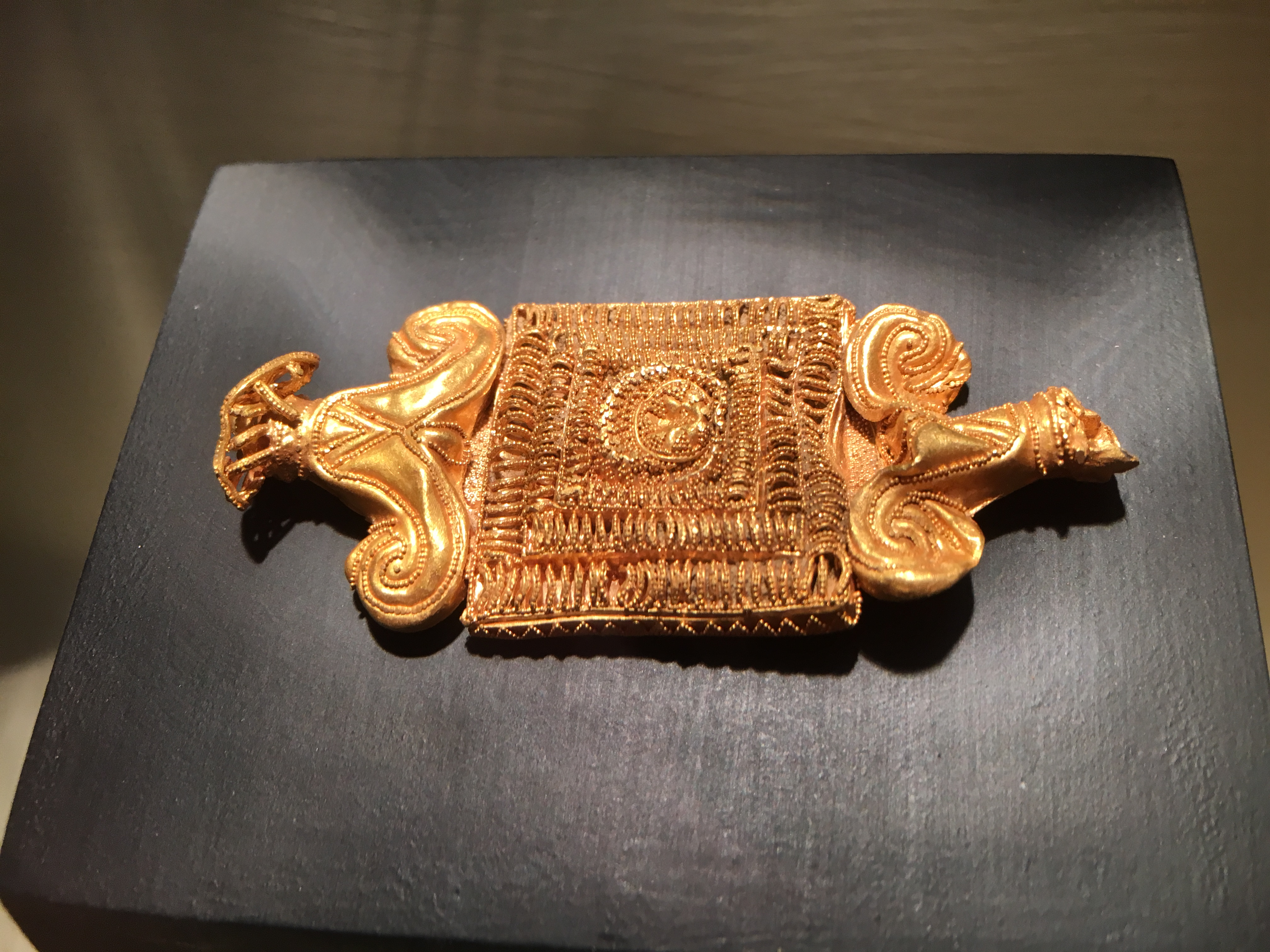
Écija Plaque

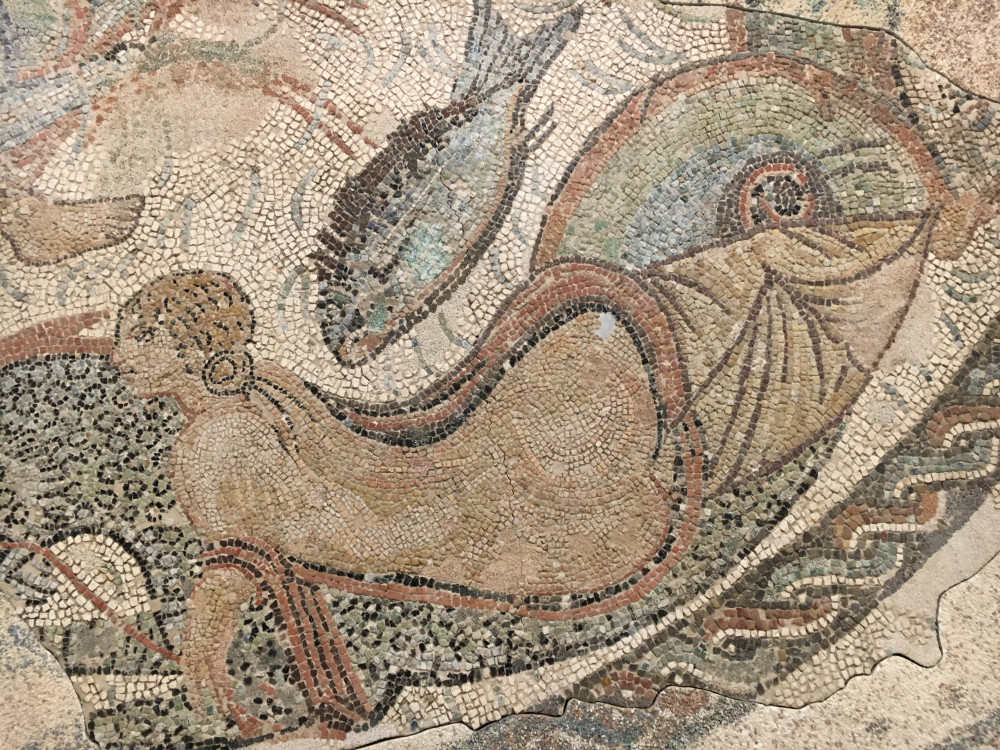
Detail of the Roman mosaic of the Nereids

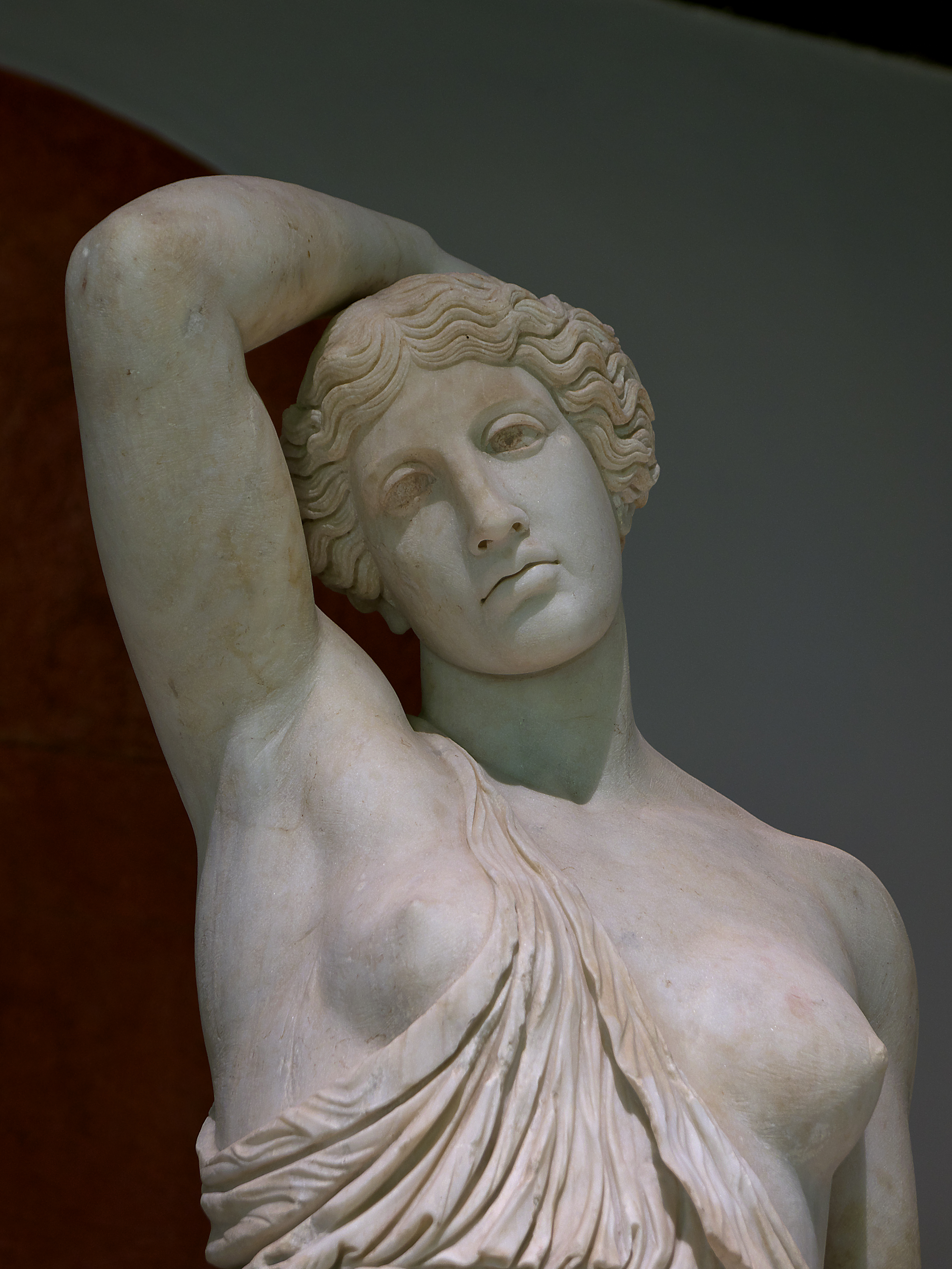
Detail of the wounded amazon
