= Convento de la Santísima Trinidad y Purísima Concepción (Écija) =

Convent in Andalusia, Spain

Coordinates: 37.5422°N 5.0822°W

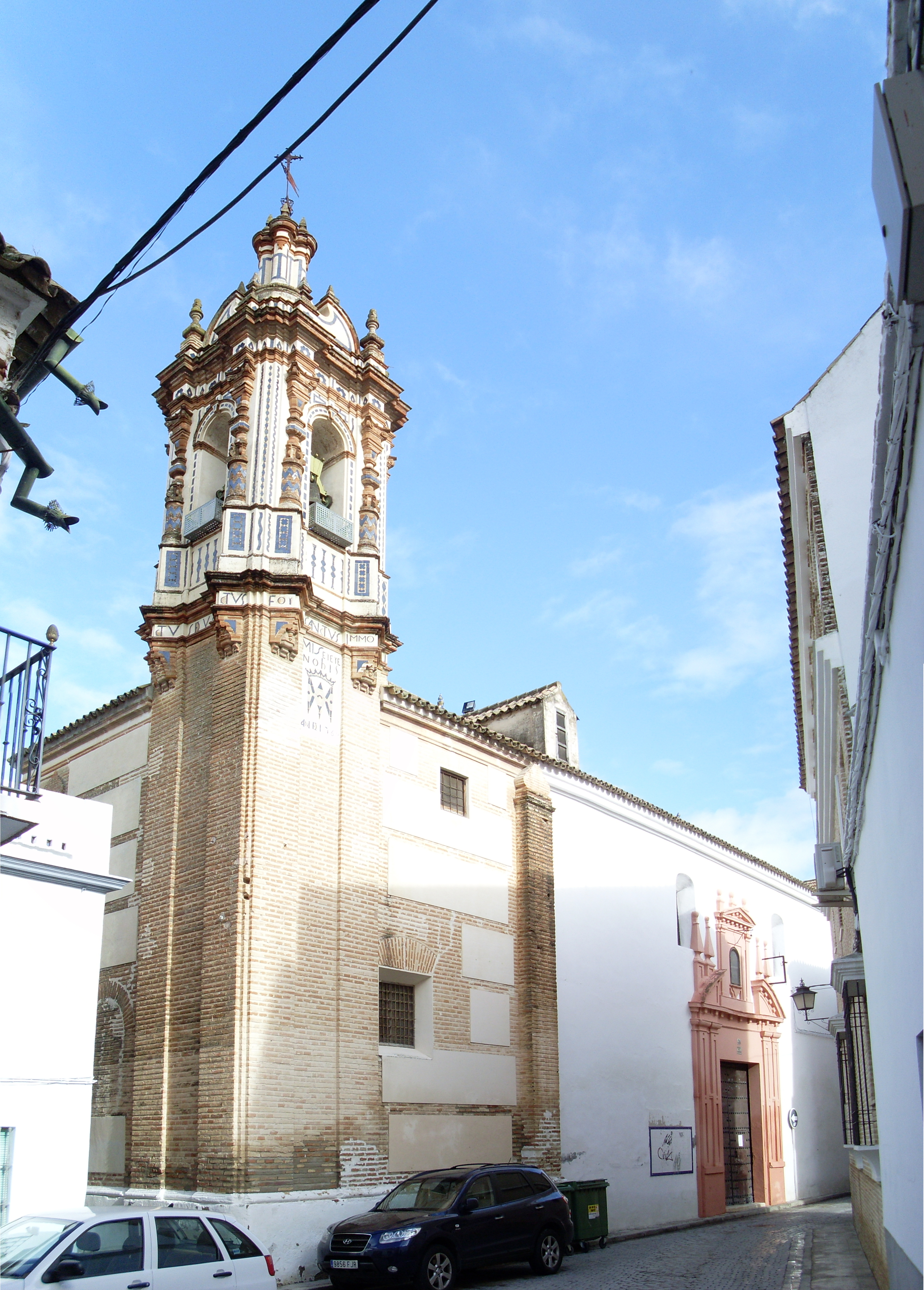
Convento de la Santísima Trinidad y Purísima Concepción

Convento de la Santísima Trinidad y Purísima Concepción (Convent of the Holy Trinity and Immaculate Conception) is located in Écija, Province of Seville, Spain. It is governed by the Franciscan Conceptionists. Popularly known as Marroquies, it is located a few meters from the Iglesia de la Limpia Concepción de Nuestra Señora. In 1582, the Marroquí sisters, Luisa, Catalina, Ana and Francisca, descendants of one of the oldest families of Ecija, decided to found a monastery of nuns. The blessing of the new church and convent complex occurred on May 21, 1596. It was declared a Bien de Interés Cultural site on November 17, 2009. The simple structure contains its original angular belfry and a collection of paintings, altarpieces, sculptures, and jewelry, featuring Moorish and Andalusian Baroque art.
