= 1996–97 Segunda División =

66th season of the second-tier football league in Spain

Segunda División
- Season: 1996–97
- Champions: CP Mérida
- Promoted: CP Mérida; UD Salamanca; RCD Mallorca
- Relegated: Almería CF; Real Madrid B; Barcelona B; Écija Balompié
- Matches: 380
- Goals: 910 (2.39 per match)
- Top goalscorer: (Spain) Yordi; (Portugal) Pauleta

The 1996–97 Segunda División season saw 20 teams participate in the second flight Spanish league. CP Mérida won the league.

CP Mérida, UD Salamanca and RCD Mallorca were promoted to Primera División. Almería CF, Real Madrid B, Barcelona B and Écija were relegated to Segunda División B.

== Teams ==
Location of teams in Segunda División 1996-97
Canary Islands

Team	Home city	Stadium
Alavés	Vitoria-Gasteiz	Mendizorrotza
Albacete	Albacete	Carlos Belmonte
Almería	Almería	Antonio Franco Navarro
Atlético Madrid B	Majadahonda	Cerro del Espino
Badajoz	Badajoz	El Vivero
Barcelona B	Barcelona	Mini Estadi
Écija	Écija	San Pablo
Eibar	Eibar	Ipurua
Las Palmas	Las Palmas	Insular
Leganés	Leganés	Luis Rodríguez de Miguel
Levante	Valencia	Nou Estadi
Lleida	Lleida	Camp d'Esports
Mallorca	Mallorca	Lluís Sitjar
Mérida	Mérida	Romano
Osasuna	Pamplona	El Sadar
Ourense	Ourense	O Couto
Real Madrid B	Madrid	Ciudad Deportiva
Salamanca	Villares de la Reina	Helmántico
Toledo	Toledo	Salto del Caballo
Villarreal	Villarreal	El Madrigal

=== Teams by Autonomous Community ===
	Autonomous community	Number of teams	Teams
1	Madrid	3	Atlético Madrid B, Leganés, Real Madrid B
2	Andalusia	2	Almería, Écija
2	(Basque Country (autonomous community)) Basque Country	2	Alavés, Eibar
2	Castile-La Mancha	2	Albacete, Toledo
2	Catalonia	2	Barcelona B, Lleida
2	Extremadura	2	Badajoz, Mérida
2	Valencia	2	Levante, Villarreal
7	Balearic Islands	1	Mallorca
7	Canary Islands	1	Las Palmas
7	Castile and León	1	Salamanca
7	Galicia	1	Ourense
7	Navarre	1	Osasuna

== Final table ==
Pos	Team	Pld	W	D	L	GF	GA	GD	Pts	Promotion or relegation
1	CP Mérida	38	21	9	8	57	35	+22	72	Promoted to Primera División
2	UD Salamanca	38	20	11	7	72	33	+39	71	Promoted to Primera División
3	RCD Mallorca	38	20	10	8	59	38	+21	70	Promotion playoff
4	Albacete	38	19	9	10	51	32	+19	66	
5	SD Eibar	38	17	15	6	44	26	+18	66	
6	CD Badajoz	38	15	15	8	38	26	+12	60	
7	UD Las Palmas	38	13	13	12	54	46	+8	52	
8	CD Leganés	38	13	13	12	43	39	+4	52	
9	Levante UD	38	13	11	14	53	46	+7	50	
10	Villarreal CF	38	13	9	16	38	52	−14	48	
11	UE Lleida	38	12	12	14	48	41	+7	48	
12	Atlético de Madrid B	38	12	11	15	57	61	−4	47	
13	Deportivo Alavés	38	12	11	15	43	47	−4	47	
14	CD Toledo	38	12	9	17	37	53	−16	45	
15	CD Ourense	38	11	11	16	35	46	−11	44	
16	CA Osasuna	38	11	11	16	34	42	−8	44	
17	Almería CF	38	9	14	15	40	51	−11	41	Relegated to Segunda División B
18	Real Madrid B	38	11	8	19	40	69	−29	41	Relegated to Segunda División B
19	Barcelona B	38	7	13	18	40	63	−23	34	Relegated to Segunda División B
20	Écija	38	7	9	22	27	64	−37	30	Relegated to Segunda División B

== Results ==
Home \ Away	ALV	ALB	ALM	ATM	BAD	BAR	ÉCI	EIB	LPA	LEG	LEV	LLE	MLL	MÉR	OSA	OUR	RMC	SAL	TOL	VIL
Alavés	—	0–2	1–1	0–1	1–0	0–1	4–0	1–3	1–1	2–0	0–2	3–1	2–3	0–0	0–1	0–0	5–3	0–4	1–0	2–1
Albacete	1–1	—	1–0	1–0	0–0	0–1	2–0	1–0	1–1	0–1	1–0	0–1	3–2	1–0	2–1	2–0	2–2	1–2	2–1	2–0
Almería	1–0	1–1	—	1–1	1–0	2–2	0–1	0–1	0–0	3–2	0–2	2–0	2–1	1–3	0–3	2–3	3–0	2–2	2–0	0–0
Atlético B	1–2	1–3	0–0	—	1–1	2–2	1–1	0–1	1–2	1–2	2–1	1–0	4–1	3–1	3–3	0–1	3–0	1–1	3–2	0–1
Badajoz	1–0	0–0	0–0	4–4	—	2–0	1–0	0–0	2–0	1–0	1–1	0–0	3–1	0–1	0–1	0–0	1–1	0–1	2–1	0–0
Barcelona B	2–3	1–4	3–2	2–2	1–0	—	2–1	3–3	1–2	0–1	2–1	0–0	1–2	0–1	0–0	1–1	1–2	1–3	1–1	2–2
Écija	1–1	0–2	0–1	0–1	1–2	1–1	—	0–2	0–0	2–1	0–0	3–1	0–2	0–2	2–0	1–1	0–2	0–0	1–1	2–1
Eibar	1–0	1–0	1–1	1–1	0–0	1–0	3–0	—	0–0	0–0	2–0	2–0	1–2	2–2	1–1	2–0	1–1	0–0	1–0	2–0
Las Palmas	1–1	3–1	1–1	6–0	2–2	2–1	2–1	2–0	—	2–0	4–2	1–1	2–2	1–2	3–1	2–0	3–4	1–1	1–2	0–0
Leganés	0–0	2–1	3–0	0–1	0–0	2–2	4–1	1–2	1–0	—	1–1	3–2	0–1	1–1	2–0	5–0	0–1	1–1	0–0	1–1
Levante	0–1	0–0	2–2	3–2	2–2	4–0	0–2	0–1	2–1	3–3	—	0–0	1–2	1–0	2–1	2–1	5–1	2–2	5–1	2–1
Lleida	0–0	0–3	0–1	5–1	3–0	0–0	4–0	2–1	2–0	4–0	2–1	—	1–1	0–0	0–0	3–0	4–0	3–1	1–1	1–2
Mallorca	3–1	1–1	3–2	2–1	0–2	2–0	2–1	1–1	3–0	3–0	1–0	0–0	—	1–1	0–0	1–1	4–0	2–1	4–0	2–0
Mérida	3–2	4–0	3–3	3–2	2–0	5–1	1–1	2–1	2–0	2–0	1–1	0–2	2–1	—	2–1	0–0	1–0	1–0	3–1	4–0
Osasuna	1–1	1–1	2–1	0–3	0–1	1–0	3–0	0–0	1–1	0–0	1–0	3–0	1–0	0–1	—	1–1	2–0	0–3	0–1	4–1
Ourense	0–1	2–0	1–0	1–1	0–1	2–1	1–3	1–2	2–0	1–1	1–3	1–0	0–0	2–0	1–0	—	1–2	1–3	0–1	4–0
R. Madrid B	1–0	0–3	2–1	0–3	1–3	1–0	2–1	3–3	0–2	0–3	0–1	2–2	0–1	4–0	2–0	0–2	—	0–0	0–1	1–1
Salamanca	2–1	1–2	3–0	4–2	0–1	3–0	4–0	0–1	4–2	0–1	1–1	3–0	3–1	1–0	5–0	1–1	3–0	—	3–1	2–1
Toledo	1–1	0–4	1–1	2–0	0–1	2–2	4–0	0–0	0–3	0–1	1–0	3–2	0–0	1–0	1–0	2–0	2–1	0–2	—	1–2
Villarreal	2–4	0–0	2–0	1–3	0–3	0–2	3–0	1–0	0–1	0–0	2–0	2–1	0–1	0–1	1–0	2–1	1–1	2–2	3–1	—

Source: SoccerWay
Legend: Blue = home team win; Yellow = draw; Red = away team win.

== Promotion playoff ==
Team 1	Agg.	Team 2	1st leg	2nd leg
RCD Mallorca	(a) 2–2	Rayo Vallecano	1–0	1–2

=== First leg ===
25 June 1997	RCD Mallorca	1–0	Rayo Vallecano	Palma de Mallorca
22:00	Barbero 17'	Report (in Spanish)		Stadium: Lluís Sitjar; Attendance: 25,000; Referee: Juan Manuel Brito Arceo (Canary Islands)

=== Second leg ===
29 June 1997	Rayo Vallecano	2–1 (2–2 agg.)	RCD Mallorca	Madrid
21:30	Klimowicz 38' (pen.); Cortijo 86'	Report (in Spanish)	Carlitos 58'	Stadium: Vallecas; Attendance: 14,000; Referee: Celino Gracia Redondo (Aragon)
