= Écija =

- Municipality
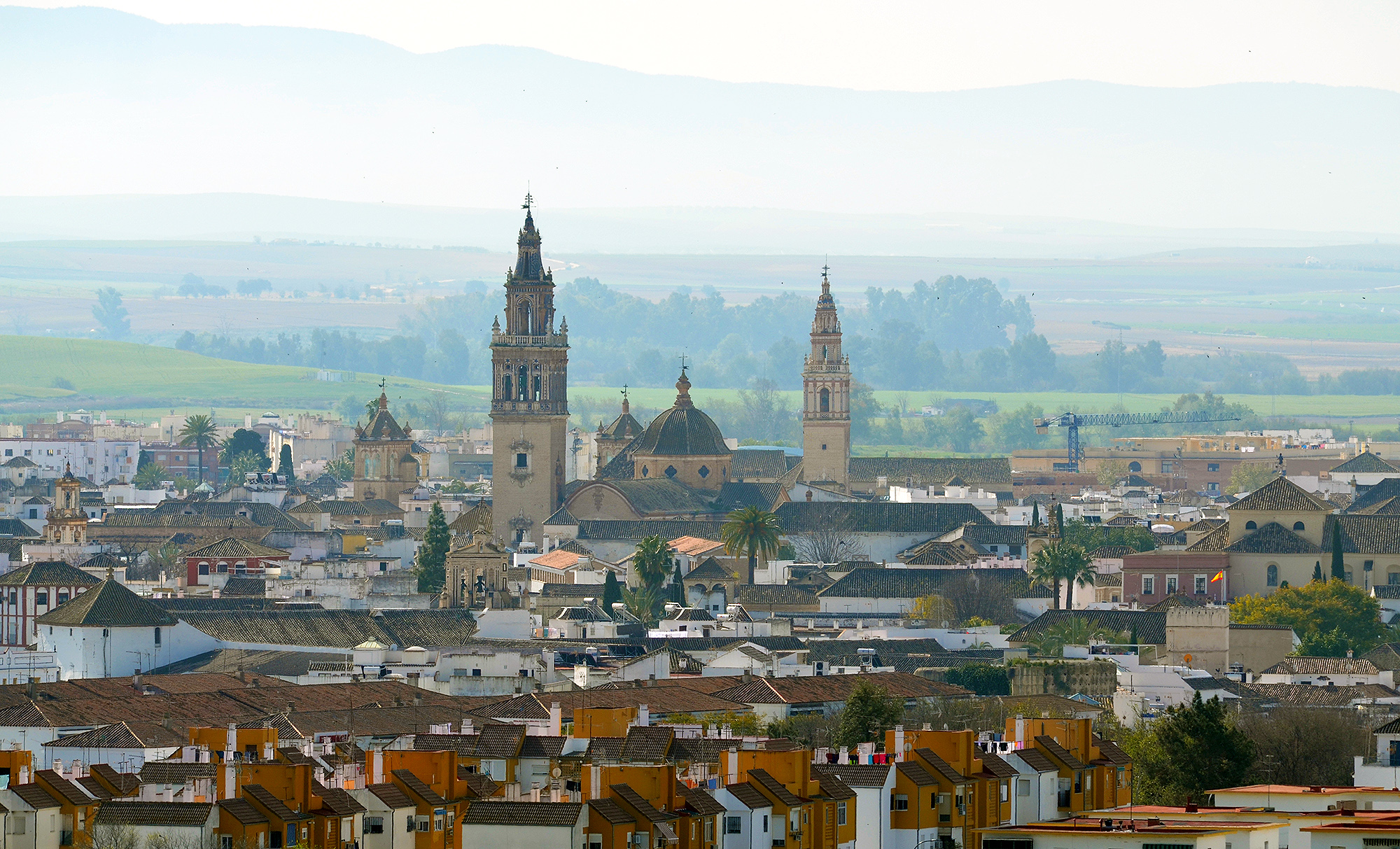

- Flag Coat of arms
- Location of Écija
- Coordinates: 37°32′28″N 5°4′46″W
- Country: Spain
- Autonomous community: Andalusia
- Province: Seville

Government
  - Mayor: David Javier García Ostos (2015–) (PSOE)

Area
  - Total: 978.73 km^{2} (377.89 sq mi)

Population (2025-01-01)
  - Total: 39,659
  - Density: 40.521/km^{2} (104.95/sq mi)
- Time zone: UTC+1 (CET)
  - Summer (DST): UTC+2 (CEST)
- Postal code: 41400
- Website: Official website

Écija (Spanish pronunciation: [ˈeθixa]) is a city and municipality of Spain belonging to the province of Seville, in the autonomous community of Andalusia. It is in the countryside, 85 km east of the city of Seville. According to the 2008 census, Écija had a total population of 40,100 inhabitants, ranking as the fifth most populous municipality in the province. The river Genil, the main tributary of the river Guadalquivir, runs through the city.

The economy of Écija is based on agriculture (olives, cereals and vegetables), cattle (cows and horses) and textile industry.

The most distinctive feature of the urban landscape of Écija are the city's Baroque bell towers.

== History ==
=== Roman Astigi ===
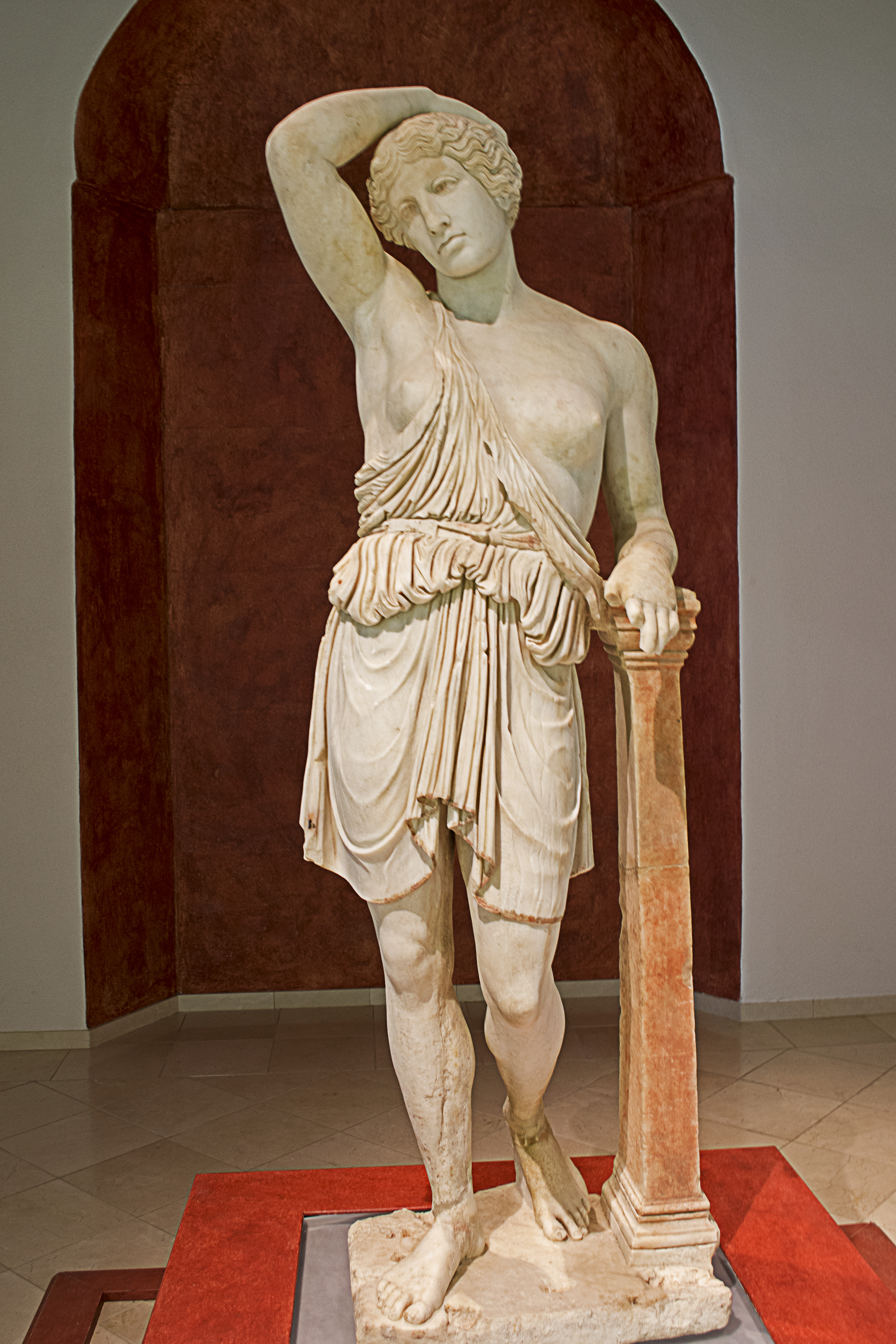
The so-called wounded amazon, a sculpture from the Colonia Firma Astigi found in the Plaza Mayor de Écija on 7 February 2002, exhibited at the Municipal History Museum of Écija.

Ancient Iberian finds date back to the 8th century BC, and there are several archaeological remains of later Greek and Roman settlements. In Roman times the town was at first known as Astigi. During the Roman civil war Écija stood "firmly" at the side of Julius Caesar in the Battle of Munda. As a reward Caesar ordered the town's fortification and refounded it as a Julian colony, possibly Colonia Iulia Firma Astigitana. Under the reign of Octavian, the later emperor Augustus, the colony was strengthened according to Caesar's construction plans, and its name was finalised as Colonia Iulia Augusta Firma Astigitana. According to Pliny the Elder and Pomponius Mela, who both wrote in the 1st century AD, it was the rival of Cordova and Seville.

Astigi was an important town of Hispania Baetica, as well as the seat of the Astigitanus, one of the four conventi where the chief men met together at fixed times of the year under the eye of the proconsul to oversee the administration of justice. It was also, from an early date, the seat of a diocese. Fulgentius of Cartagena (died before 633) was named to the see by his brother Isidore of Seville. With the Reconquista, the archdiocese of Seville was restored, leading to the overshadowing of nearby Astigi, whose territory was joined to that of the archdiocese in 1144. Astigi thus ceased to be a residential diocese and is today listed by the Catholic Church as a titular see.

=== Post-Roman ===
After the Romans, it was ruled by successively by Suevs and Visigoths.

In 711, Écija was conquered by an Islamic army on its way to Córdoba, meeting strong opposition from the population, who offered a 6-month-long resistance before capitulating. Capital of an extensive Kūra, Écija (known as Istiǧǧa during the Muslim era) preserved its condition as a centre of high agricultural productivity, featuring a cereal-based production (wheat, barley, sorghum). Due to its productive agricultural systems able to sustain several harvests a year, Écija served as a food provider for Córdoba and Seville. The city walls were demolished in the early 10th century as punishment for the local support to the rebellion against Umayyad rule led by Umar ibn Hafsun. New walls, enclosing a smaller area than the Roman era Astigi were built by Almohads, tightening the size of the medina.

The place was seized by Christians on 3 May 1240. The proximity to the newly born Nasrid Kingdom of Granada turned Écija into a border town for years to come. Écija soon became a realengo, a territory directly dependent on the Crown (of Castile). Most of the mudéjar population was expelled in 1263. The countryside of Écija greatly suffered from the Marinid razzias in the Guadalquivir Valley initiated in 1275. The Jewish population of Écija apparently suffered the antisemitic revolt initiated after the assault on the jewry of Seville in June 1391, that spread across Andalusia and much of the Iberian Peninsula. Écija consolidated its status as border town during the 14th century. Écija was granted the title of city in 1402. It was not until 1410, with the conquest of Antequera, that Écija stopped being the head of a borderland territory. During the 15th century, Écija was the third most important urban centre of the Kingdom of Seville after Seville and Jerez, progressively evening the distance with the latter. Estimations for the 15th century yield a population of about 18,000.

=== Modern era ===
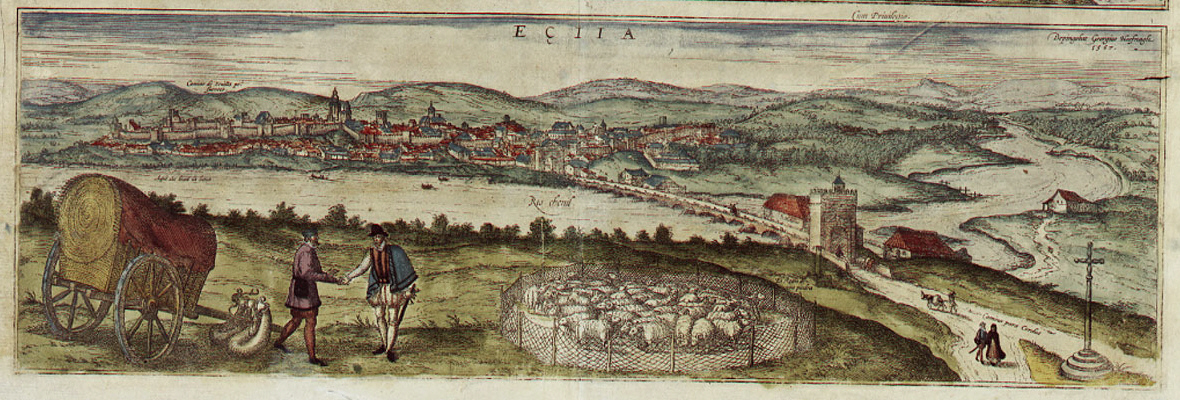
View of Écija circa 1567 by Joris Hoefnagel, published in the Civitates orbis terrarum.

During the transition from the late middle ages to the early modern period, Écija remained integrated, within the Crown of Castile, in the Kingdom of Seville. A significant community of "new christians" of Portuguese origin settled in Écija in the Early Modern period, acquiring a notable influence in the city. Olive oil production grew at the expense of the relative dominance of the traditional cereal crops starting by the 17th century.

Strategically located in between Seville and Córdoba, Écija remained one of the most important Andalusian cities, economically thriving in the 17th and 18th centuries. It also stood out for its wool trade, with the lavaderos in control of Flemish merchants. Écija featured a relatively multicultural society, allowing for Peninsular and European denizens, and even from the Americas, to share a common space of interchange.

The effects of the 1755 earthquake forced a deep urban renewal in Écija. The city had an urban population of 29,343 circa 1786–1787.

Although Astigi was one of the most complete Roman cities to have been discovered, the city council decided in 1998 to bulldoze Écija's Roman ruins, including "a well-preserved Roman forum, bath house, gymnasium and temple as well as dozens of private homes and hundreds of mosaics and statues" and replace them with a 299-car parking lot.

== Geography ==
=== Location ===
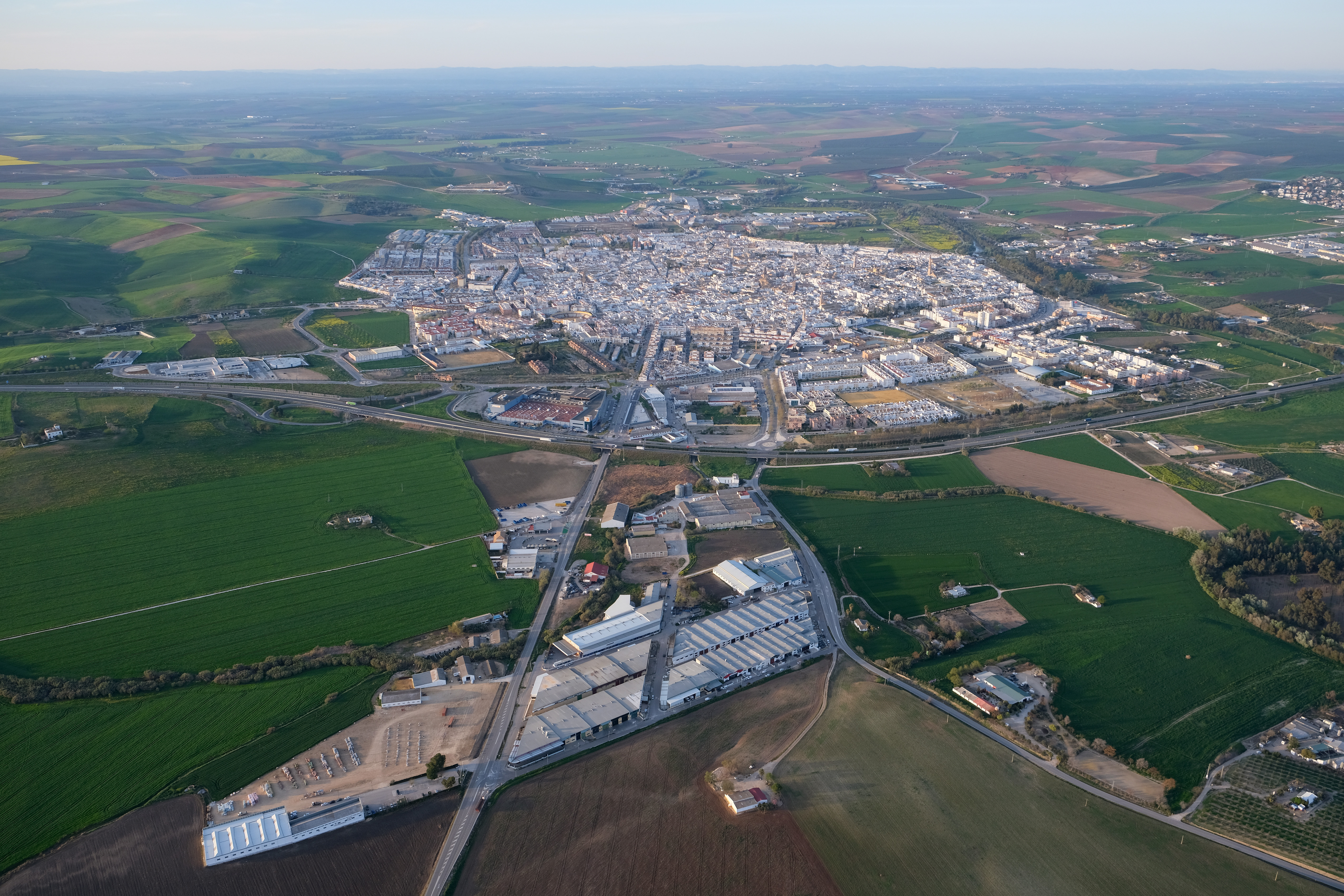
Aerial view of Écija (March 2021)

The urban nucleus of Écija lies on the left bank of the Genil, over the river's fluvial terraces, built in the Roman era on a location apt for the control of the river and its meadows.

=== Climate ===
Écija has a hot summer mediterranean climate, with mild wet winters and very hot, dry summers. Écija is one of the cities considered to be "the frying pan" of Spain, due to its location on the Guadalquivir valley. Precipitation is relatively low compared to the other regions on the valley. However, Écija suffered several floods in December 2010.

Climate data for Ecija (2001-2025), extremes (2001-present)
Month	Jan	Feb	Mar	Apr	May	Jun	Jul	Aug	Sep	Oct	Nov	Dec	Year
Record high °C (°F)	25.0 (77.0)	26.6 (79.9)	30.8 (87.4)	37.9 (100.2)	40.5 (104.9)	42.9 (109.2)	45.6 (114.1)	46.6 (115.9)	44.1 (111.4)	37.1 (98.8)	29.9 (85.8)	24.5 (76.1)	46.6 (115.9)
Mean daily maximum °C (°F)	15.8 (60.4)	17.3 (63.1)	20.1 (68.2)	23.3 (73.9)	27.9 (82.2)	33.3 (91.9)	37.2 (99.0)	36.7 (98.1)	31.7 (89.1)	26.4 (79.5)	19.6 (67.3)	16.4 (61.5)	25.5 (77.9)
Daily mean °C (°F)	9.9 (49.8)	11.1 (52.0)	13.6 (56.5)	16.6 (61.9)	20.3 (68.5)	24.9 (76.8)	28.2 (82.8)	28.2 (82.8)	24.4 (75.9)	20.0 (68.0)	13.8 (56.8)	10.8 (51.4)	18.5 (65.3)
Mean daily minimum °C (°F)	3.9 (39.0)	4.8 (40.6)	7.0 (44.6)	9.8 (49.6)	12.6 (54.7)	16.5 (61.7)	19.2 (66.6)	19.7 (67.5)	17.0 (62.6)	13.6 (56.5)	8.0 (46.4)	5.1 (41.2)	11.4 (52.6)
Record low °C (°F)	−10.1 (13.8)	−5.9 (21.4)	−3.3 (26.1)	0.8 (33.4)	4.3 (39.7)	10.0 (50.0)	11.2 (52.2)	12.1 (53.8)	7.1 (44.8)	3.0 (37.4)	−2.8 (27.0)	−5.3 (22.5)	−10.1 (13.8)
Average precipitation mm (inches)	44.2 (1.74)	47.8 (1.88)	67.3 (2.65)	51.6 (2.03)	30.1 (1.19)	5.8 (0.23)	0.6 (0.02)	2.1 (0.08)	20.9 (0.82)	60.3 (2.37)	77.7 (3.06)	57.3 (2.26)	465.7 (18.33)
Source: Agencia Estatal de Meteorología (AEMET OpenData)

== Population ==
Development of the Écija population since 1900

== Landmarks ==
- Convento de la Santísima Trinidad y Purísima Concepción
- Real Monasterio de Santa Inés del Valle
- Church of Santa María
- St. James' Church
- Holy Cross Church
- St John the Baptist's Church
- Peñaflor House
- Benamejí Palace
- Vallehermoso House

== See also ==
- List of municipalities in Seville
