= Álvaro Iglesias (footballer) =

Spanish footballer

Personal information
- Full name: Álvaro Iglesias Quintana
- Date of birth: 12 July 1972 (age 54)
- Place of birth: Barakaldo, Spain
- Height: 1.83 m (6 ft 0 in)
- Position: Goalkeeper

Senior career*
Years	Team	Apps	(Gls)
1991 – 1992	Arenas Getxo		
1992 – 1993	Santurtzi	37	(0)
1993 – 1995	Sestao	17	(0)
1995 – 1997	Barakaldo	70	(0)
1997 – 1998	Córdoba	1	(0)
1998 – 1999	Racing Ferrol	27	(0)
1999–2000	Gernika	23	(0)
2000–2001	Figueres	29	(0)
2001–2002	Lanzarote	16	(0)
2002–2003	Ponferradina	35	(0)
2003–2005	Tenerife	46	(0)
2005–2007	Gimnàstic	18	(0)
2007–2008	Poli Ejido	19	(0)
2008–2011	Sestao River	37	(0)
Total		375	(0)
- * Club domestic league appearances and goals

Álvaro Iglesias Quintana (born 12 July 1972) is a Spanish retired footballer who played as a goalkeeper.

== Football career ==
Born in Barakaldo, Biscay, Iglesias spent the vast majority of his 20-year senior career in the lower leagues, representing several clubs in Segunda División B. His professional input consisted of 83 Segunda División matches during four seasons, representing in the competition CD Tenerife, Gimnàstic de Tarragona and Polideportivo Ejido.

Iglesias was also part of Gimnàstic's La Liga squad in 2006–07, but was not used in the league during the campaign. His only competitive appearance came on 8 November 2006, when he played the entire 1–3 home loss against Real Valladolid for round of 32 of the Copa del Rey.
