= 1986–87 Real Madrid CF season =

85th season in existence of Real Madrid CF

Real Madrid
1986–87 season
- President: Ramón Mendoza
- Manager: Leo Beenhakker
- Stadium: Santiago Bernabeu
- La Liga: 1st (in 1987–88 European Cup)
- Copa del Rey: Semi-finals
- European Cup: Semi-finals
- Top goalscorer: League: Hugo Sánchez (34 goals); All: Hugo Sánchez (43 goals)
Home colours	Away colours

The 1986–87 season was Real Madrid Club de Fútbol's 85th season in existence and the club's 56th consecutive season in the top flight of Spanish football.

== Season ==
It was the longest season ever for Real Madrid. The league had two phases. In the first one, all 18 teams played each other twice (home and away). At the end of the first phase, the first six teams qualified for the championship group (Group A), the next six qualified for the intermediate group (Group B) and the last six qualified for the relegation group (Group C). In the second phase, Real Madrid played only against teams of the same group twice (home and away) and carried over their first phase record. The team played 44 games overall, finishing with 66 points and claiming its 22nd league title in history.

== Squad ==
Note: Flags indicate national team as defined under FIFA eligibility rules; some limited exceptions apply. Players may hold more than one non-FIFA nationality.

No.	Pos.	Nation	Player
-	GK	ESP	Otxotorena
-	GK	ESP	Agustín Rodríguez
-	GK	ESP	Francisco Buyo
-	GK	ESP	Canales
-	DF	ESP	Chendo
-	DF	ESP	Manuel Sanchís
-	DF	ESP	Antonio Maceda
-	DF	ESP	José Antonio Salguero
-	DF	ESP	Isidoro San José
-	DF	ESP	Jesús Ángel Solana
-	DF	ESP	Mino
-	DF	ESP	José Antonio Camacho

No.	Pos.	Nation	Player
-	MF	ESP	Ricardo Gallego
-	MF	ESP	Míchel
-	MF	ESP	Rafael Gordillo
-	MF	ESP	Rafael Martín Vázquez
-	MF	YUG	Milan Janković
-	FW	MEX	Hugo Sánchez
-	FW	ESP	Emilio Butragueño
-	FW	ARG	Jorge Valdano
-	FW	ESP	Santillana
-	FW	ESP	Juanito
-	FW	ESP	Miguel Pardeza

=== Transfers ===
In
Pos.	Name	from	Type
GK	Francisco Buyo	Sevilla FC	€380,000
DF	Mino	Sporting Gijón	
FW	Miguel Pardeza	Real Zaragoza	loan ended

Out
Pos.	Name	To	Type
FW	Cholo	Real Zaragoza	
MF	Francis	RCD Español	
MF	Isidoro San José	RCD Mallorca	
GK	Mariano García Remón		retired
GK	Miguel Angel		retired

==== Spring ====
In
Pos.	Name	from	Type
MF	Milan Janković	Crvena Zvezda	(from 1 April 1987)

Out
Pos.	Name	To	Type

== Competitions ==
=== La Liga ===
==== Results by round ====
Round	1	2	3	4	5	6	7	8	9	10	11	12	13	14	15	16	17	18	19	20	21	22	23	24	25	26	27	28	29	30	31	32	33	34	35	36	37	38	39	40	41	42	43	44
Ground	H	A	H	A	H	A	A	H	A	H	A	H	A	H	A	H	A	A	H	A	H	A	H	H	A	H	A	H	A	H	A	H	A	H	A	H	H	H	H	H	A	A	H	A
Result	W	D	D	W	W	W	L	D	D	W	D	W	W	L	D	D	W	W	W	D	D	W	W	W	L	W	L	W	W	W	W	W	W	D	D	W	W	W	W	L	W	W	W	D
Position	2	3	4	1	1	1	2	2	3	1	2	1	1	2	2	2	2	2	2	2	2	2	2	2	2	2	2	2	2	1	1	1	1	1	1	1	1	1	1	1	1	1	1	1

Source: BDFutbol
A = Away; H = Home; W = Win; D = Draw; L = Loss; = Leader, 1987–88 European Cup; = 1987–88 UEFA Cup; = 1987–88 Segunda División

==== League table ====
Regular season
Pos	Team	Pld	W	D	L	GF	GA	GD	Pts	Qualification
1	Real Madrid	34	20	10	4	61	29	+32	50	Qualification for the championship group
2	Barcelona	34	18	13	3	51	22	+29	49	Qualification for the championship group
3	Español	34	17	9	8	52	30	+22	43	Qualification for the championship group
4	Sporting Gijón	34	14	9	11	47	36	+11	37	Qualification for the championship group
5	Mallorca	34	14	8	12	42	46	−4	36	Qualification for the championship group
6	Zaragoza	34	13	10	11	31	30	+1	36	Qualification for the championship group
7	Atlético Madrid	34	13	9	12	37	40	−3	35	Qualification for the intermediate group

Source: BDFútbol
Rules for classification: 1) Points; 2) Head-to-head results; 3) Goal difference; 4) Number of goals scored

Championship group
Pos	Team	Pld	W	D	L	GF	GA	GD	Pts	Qualification or relegation
1	Real Madrid	44	27	12	5	84	37	+47	66	Qualification for the European Cup first round
2	Barcelona	44	24	15	5	63	29	+34	63	Qualification for the UEFA Cup first round
3	Español	44	20	11	13	66	46	+20	51	Qualification for the UEFA Cup first round
4	Sporting Gijón	44	16	13	15	58	50	+8	45	Qualification for the UEFA Cup first round
5	Zaragoza	44	15	14	15	46	47	−1	44	
6	Mallorca	44	15	12	17	48	65	−17	42	

Source: BDFútbol
Rules for classification: 1) Points; 2) Head-to-head results; 3) Goal difference; 4) Number of goals scored

==== Matches ====
31 August 1986 1	Real Murcia	1–3	Real Madrid	Murcia
	Manolo 42'; Perez Garcia (yellow card) 85' (yellow-red card); Amador (yellow card) 89' (yellow-red card); Parra (yellow card); Guina (yellow card)	Report	Valdano 9'; Hugo Sánchez 30'; Hugo Sánchez 89'; Camacho (yellow card); Chendo (yellow card)	Referee: Antonio Martin Navarrete

7 September 1986 2	Real Madrid	1–1	UD Las Palmas	Madrid
	Butragueño 86'; Buyo (yellow card); Hugo Sánchez (yellow card)	Report	Saavedra 89'; Chinea (yellow card)	Stadium: Estadio Santiago Bernabéu; Referee: Jaime Bayarri Rivelles

10 September 1986 3	Sporting Gijón	2–2	Real Madrid	Gijón
	Luis Flores 1'; Mesa 35'; Ablanedo (red card) 38'	Report	Jorge Valdano 20'; Hugo Sánchez 38' (pen.); Mino (yellow card) 43' (yellow-red card)	Stadium: Estadio El Molinon

13 September 1986 4	Real Madrid	3–1	Real Zaragoza	Madrid
	Hugo Sánchez 4'; Valdano 50'; Hugo Sánchez 57'	Report	Julia 30'	Stadium: Santiago Bernabeu; Referee: Jose Merino Gonzalez

21 September 1986 5	Real Betis	2–6	Real Madrid	Sevilla
	Ito 6'; Faruk Hadzibegic 76' (pen.)	Report	Hugo Sánchez 1'; Butragueño 11'; Michel 25'; Butragueño 29'; Hugo Sánchez 31' (pen.); Hugo Sánchez 60'	Stadium: Estadio Benito Villamarin

27 September 1986 6	Real Madrid	1–0	Real Sociedad	Madrid
	Michel 75'	Report		Stadium: Estadio Santiago Bernabéu; Referee: Miguel Marín López

5 October 1986 7	CA Osasuna	1–0	Real Madrid	Pamplona
	Bustingorri 37'; Lumbreras (yellow card); Ibañez (yellow card); Enrique Martin (yellow card)	Report	Solana (yellow card); Hugo Sánchez (yellow card)	Stadium: Estadio El Sadar; Referee: Tomas Jimenez Moreno

8 October 1986 8	Real Madrid	1–1	FC Barcelona	Madrid
	Hugo Sánchez 27' (pen.); Valdano (yellow card); Emilio Butragueño (yellow card)	Report	Angel Pedraza 6'; Gerardo (yellow card); Victor Muñoz (yellow card); Hughes (yellow card)	Stadium: Estadio Santiago Bernabéu; Referee: Ildefonso Urizar

12 October 1986 9	Racing Santander	0–0	Real Madrid	Santander
		Report		Stadium: Estadio El Sardinero

18 October 1986 10	Real Madrid	3–0	RCD Mallorca	Madrid
	Salguero 47'; Hugo Sánchez 72'; Butragueño 75'	Report		Stadium: Estadio Santiago Bernabéu; Referee: Severiano Perez Sanchez

26 October 1986 11	Cádiz CF	0–0	Real Madrid	Cádiz
		Report		Stadium: Ramon Carranza

1 November 1986 12	Real Madrid	4–0	CE Sabadell	Madrid
	Hugo Sánchez 25'; Valdano 40'; Hugo Sánchez 57'; Juanito 89'	Report		Stadium: Estadio Santiago Bernabéu; Referee: Antonio Taboada Soto

8 November 1986 13	Sevilla FC	0–1	Real Madrid	Sevilla
		Report	28' Gallego	Stadium: Estadio Sanchez Pizjuan

16 November 1986 14	Real Madrid	2–4	Athletic Bilbao	Madrid
	Hugo Sánchez 14'; Hugo Sánchez 16'	Report	Endika 43'; Endika 69'; Andrinua 79'; Gallego 83'	Stadium: Estadio Santiago Bernabéu; Referee: Antonio Martin Navarrete

23 November 1986 15	Real Valladolid	1–1	Real Madrid	Valladolid
	Moré 50'; Hierro (red card) 78'; Fenoy (yellow card); Moreno (yellow card)	Report	Hugo Sánchez 3'; Solana (yellow card); Juanito (yellow card)	Stadium: Estadio Jose Zorrilla; Referee: Jose Perez Sanchez

7 December 1986 16	Atlético Madrid	1–1	Real Madrid	Madrid
	Landaburu 57'	Report	Hugo Sánchez 58'	Stadium: Estadio Vicente Calderón; Referee: Jose Merino Gonzalez

14 December 1986 17	Real Madrid	1–0	RCD Español	Madrid
	Santillana 14'	Report		Stadium: Estadio Santiago Bernabéu; Referee: Victoriano Sanchez Arminio

17 December 1986 18	Real Madrid	1–0	Real Murcia	Madrid
	Hugo Sánchez 35'	Report		Stadium: Estadio Santiago Bernabéu

21 December 1986 19	UD Las Palmas	0–1	Real Madrid	Las Palmas
		Report	Juanito 50' (o.g.)	Referee: Miguel Marín López

28 December 1986 20	Real Madrid	2–2	Sporting Gijón	Madrid
	Hugo Sánchez 11'; Valdano 83'	Report	Eloy 25'; Ablanedo 48'	Stadium: Estadio Santiago Bernabéu; Referee: Jose Socorro Gonzalez

4 January 1987 21	Real Zaragoza	2–2	Real Madrid	Zaragoza
	Señor 76'; Juliá 79'	Report	Michel 31'; Butragueño 59'; Hugo Sánchez (yellow card); Solana (yellow card)	Stadium: Estadio La Romareda; Referee: Joaquin Urio Velazquez

11 January 1987 22	Real Madrid	3–0	Real Betis	Madrid
	Gordillo 5'; Butragueño 34'; Butragueño 69'	Report		Stadium: Estadio Santiago Bernabéu; Referee: José Pajarez Paz

18 January 1987 23	Real Sociedad	0–2	Real Madrid	San Sebastián
		Report	Gordillo 27'; Gallego 72'	Stadium: Estadio Anoeta; Referee: Jose Miguel Perez

25 January 1987 24	Real Madrid	2–1	CA Osasuna	Madrid
	Valdano 63'; Hugo Sánchez 88' (pen.)	Report	Michael Robinson 1'	Stadium: Estadio Santiago Bernabéu; Referee: Eusebio Alvarez Diaz

31 January 1987 25	FC Barcelona	3–2	Real Madrid	Barcelona
	Lineker 2'; Lineker 5'; Lineker 47'; Victor Muñoz (yellow card); Carrasco (yellow card)	Report	Valdano 61'; Hugo Sánchez 80' (pen.); Sanchís (yellow card); Gallego (yellow card)	Stadium: Camp Nou; Referee: José Pes Pérez

8 February 1987 26	Real Madrid	3–0	Racing Santander	Madrid
	Hugo Sánchez 62' (pen.); Pardeza 75'; Hugo Sánchez 78' (pen.)	Report		Stadium: Estadio Santiago Bernabéu; Referee: Juan Andújar Oliver

15 February 1987 27	RCD Mallorca	1–0	Real Madrid	Alicante
	Magdaleno 15'	Report		Referee: Victoriano Sanchez Arminio

22 February 1987 28	Real Madrid	2–1	Cádiz CF	Madrid
	Hugo Sánchez 50'; Hugo Sánchez 78' (yellow card) 89' (yellow-red card)	Report	Linares (yellow card) 46' (yellow-red card); Montero 56' (pen.)	Stadium: Estadio Santiago Bernabéu

1 March 1987 29	CE Sabadell	0–1	Real Madrid	Sabadell
		Report	Michel 80'	Referee: Jose Perez Sanchez

8 March 1987 30	Real Madrid	2–1	Sevilla FC	Madrid
	Hugo Sánchez 45' (pen.); Miguel Pardeza 49'; Buyo (yellow card)	Report	Amaro Nadal 84'; Rafa Paz (yellow card)	Stadium: Estadio Santiago Bernabéu; Referee: Jose Benavente Garasa

15 March 1987 31	Athletic Bilbao	1–2	Real Madrid	Bilbao
	Goikoetxea 30'	Report	Mino 8'; Hugo Sánchez 24' (pen.)	Stadium: Estadio San Mames; Referee: Angel Calvo Cordova

22 March 1987 32	Real Madrid	2–1	Real Valladolid	Madrid
	Miguel Pardeza 15'; Hugo Sánchez 71' (pen.)	Report	Moya 37'	Stadium: Estadio Santiago Bernabéu; Referee: Juan Peralta Ibañez

26 March 1987 33	Real Madrid	4–1	Atlético Madrid	Madrid
	Sanchís 6'; Martín Vázquez 12'; Martín Vázquez 25'; Butragueño 58'	Report	Julio Salinas 84'	Stadium: Estadio Santiago Bernabéu; Referee: Jose Merino Gonzalez

4 April 1987 34	RCD Español	0–0	Real Madrid	Barcelona
		Report		Stadium: Estadio Sarriá

==== Playoff ====
12 April 1987 35	Real Madrid	0–0	FC Barcelona	Madrid
		Report		Stadium: Santiago Bernabeu

18 April 1987 36	Sporting Gijón	0–1	Real Madrid	Gijón
		Report	75' Milan Janković	Stadium: El Molinon; Referee: Antonio Taboada Soto

3 May 1987 37	Real Madrid	3–0	RCD Mallorca	Madrid
	Gordillo 23'; Gordillo 58'; Martín Vázquez 89'	Report		Stadium: Santiago Bernabeu; Referee: Antonio Martin Navarrete

10 May 1987 38	Real Madrid	2–1	Real Zaragoza	Zaragoza
	Miguel Pardeza 22'; Miguel Pardeza 50'	Report	46' Señor	Stadium: La Romareda; Referee: Teodoro Valdes Sanchez

16 May 1987 39	RCD Español	2–3	Real Madrid	Barcelona
	Pichi Alonso 74'; Zuñiga 77'	Report	17' (pen.) Hugo Sánchez; 59' Hugo Sánchez; 89' Michel	Stadium: Sarria

23 May 1987 40	FC Barcelona	2–1	Real Madrid	Barcelona
	Lineker 39'; Roberto 60' (pen.); Urbano (yellow card); Calderé (yellow card)	Report	Hugo Sánchez 53'; Buyo (yellow card); Gallego (yellow card)	Stadium: Camp Nou; Referee: Ildefonso Urizar Azpitarte

30 May 1987 41	Real Madrid	4–0	Sporting Gijón	Madrid
	Hugo Sánchez 1'; Hugo Sánchez 15'; Hugo Sánchez 34'; Martín Vázquez 60'	Report		Stadium: Estadio Santiago Bernabéu; Referee: Joaquin Urio Velazquez

7 June 1987 42	RCD Mallorca	0–4	Real Madrid	Palma de Mallorca
	Amer (yellow card) 62' (yellow-red card)	Report	Butragueño 33'; Martín Vázquez 36'; Gordillo 79'; Sanchís 83'; Gallego (yellow card)	Referee: Enriquez Negreira

14 June 1987 43	Real Zaragoza	1–3	Real Madrid	Zaragoza
	Pineda 86'	Report	Butragueño 14'; Butragueño 64'; Solana 80'; Martín Vázquez (yellow card)	Stadium: Estadio La Romareda; Referee: Jose Perez Sanchez

21 June 1987 44	Real Madrid	2–2	RCD Español	Madrid
	Hugo Sánchez 12' (pen.); Solana 48'	Report	Pichi Alonso 14' (pen.); Mauri 78'	Stadium: Estadio Santiago Bernabéu; Referee: Angel Calvo Cordova

=== Copa del Rey ===
==== Round of 16 ====
28 January 1987	Cádiz	0–0	Real Madrid CF	Cádiz
21:00 CET		Report (in Spanish)		Stadium: Ramón de Carranza; Referee: García de Loza

11 February 1987	Real Madrid	6–1	Cádiz	Madrid
21:00 CET	Butragueño 4', 89'; Hugo Sánchez 43', 45'; Pardeza 69'; Michel 81'	Report (in Spanish)	Mágico González 32' (pen.)	Stadium: Santiago Bernabéu; Attendance: 20,000; Referee: Enríquez Negreira

==== Quarter-finals ====
25 February 1987	Osasuna	1–2	Real Madrid	Pamplona
20:30 CET	Rípodas 45+2'	Report (in Spanish)	Valdano 15'; Hugo Sánchez 54'	Stadium: El Sadar; Referee: Pes Pérez

11 March 1987	Real Madrid	4–1	Osasuna	Madrid
21:00 CET	Hugo Sánchez 13'; Gordillo 44', 52'; Santillana 59'	Report (in Spanish)	Rípodas 40'	Stadium: Santiago Bernabéu; Attendance: 30,000; Referee: Valdés Sánchez

==== Semi-finals ====
3 June 1987	Real Madrid CF	3–2	Atlético de Madrid	Madrid
21:00 CET	Hugo Sánchez 10', 56'; Butragueño 54'	Report (in Spanish)	Quique Ramos 65'; Marina 85'	Stadium: Santiago Bernabéu; Attendance: 60,000; Referee: Merino González

10 June 1987	Atlético de Madrid	2–0	Real Madrid CF	Madrid
21:00 CET	Uralde 56'; Marina 69'	Report (in Spanish)		Stadium: Vicente Calderón; Referee: Merino González

=== European Cup ===
==== First round ====
17 September 1986	BSC Young Boys (Switzerland)	1–0	(Spain) Real Madrid	Bern
	Urs Bamert 2' (yellow card) 70'	Report	Solana (yellow card) 39'	Stadium: Wankdorf-Stadion; Referee: Paolo Casarin

1 October 1986	Real Madrid (Spain)	5–0	(Switzerland) BSC Young Boys	Madrid
	Georgamlis 8' (o.g.); Butragueño 18'; Chendo 20'; Valdano 32'; Sánchez 59'	Report	Weber (yellow card) 23'	Stadium: Estadio Santiago Bernabéu; Referee: Alain Delmer

==== Second round ====
22 October 1986	Real Madrid (Spain)	1–0	(Italy) Juventus	Madrid
20:00	Butragueño 21'; Hugo Sánchez (yellow card) 63'; Michel (yellow card) 89'	Report	Massimo Mauro (yellow card) 38'; Cabrini (yellow card) 61'	Stadium: Santiago Bernabéu Stadium; Attendance: 100,000; Referee: Bob Valentine

5 November 1986	Juventus (Italy)	1–0 (a.e.t.) (1–3 p)	(Spain) Real Madrid	Turin
	Cabrini 9'; Bonini (yellow card) 36'	Report	Chendo (yellow card) 51'; Manolo Sanchís (yellow card) 40'; Valdano (yellow card) 65'	Stadium: Stadio Comunale; Attendance: 62,000; Referee: Dieter Pauly
	Penalties
	Brio (penalty missed); Vignola (penalty scored); Manfredonia (penalty missed); Favero (penalty missed)		(penalty missed) Sánchez; (penalty scored) Butragueño; (penalty scored) Valdano; (penalty scored) Juanito

==== Quarter-finals ====
4 March 1987	Red Star Belgrade (Socialist Federal Republic of Yugoslavia)	4–2	(Spain) Real Madrid	Belgrade
17:30	Ǵurovski 7'; Đurović 12'; Cvetković 39'; Janković 84' (pen.); Krivokapic (yellow card) 88'	Report	Hugo Sánchez 66'; Hugo Sánchez 87' (pen.); Salguero (yellow card) 53'	Stadium: Stadion Crvena Zvezda; Attendance: 90,000; Referee: Keith Hackett

18 March 1987	Real Madrid (Spain)	2–0	(Socialist Federal Republic of Yugoslavia) Red Star Belgrade	Madrid
20:00	Butragueño 17'; Sanchís 64'; Hugo Sánchez (yellow card) 89'	Report	Krivokapic (yellow card) 37'; Bracun (yellow card) 77'	Stadium: Santiago Bernabéu Stadium; Attendance: 100,000; Referee: Siegfried Kirschen

==== Semi-finals ====
8 April 1987	Bayern Munich (West Germany)	4–1	(Spain) Real Madrid	Munich
19:15	Augenthaler 11'; Matthäus 30' (pen.), 52' (pen.); Wohlfarth 37'	Report	Butragueño 44'; Juanito (red card) 39'; Mino (red card) 39'	Stadium: Olympiastadion; Attendance: 75,000; Referee: (Scotland) Bob Valentine

22 April 1987	Real Madrid (Spain)	1–0 (2–4 agg.)	(West Germany) Bayern Munich	Madrid
20:00	Santillana 28'	Report	Augenthaler (red card) 30'	Stadium: Santiago Bernabéu Stadium; Attendance: 100,000; Referee: (France) Michel Vautrot

== Statistics ==
=== Matches statistics ===
Competition	Points	Total						GD
Competition	Points	G	W	D	L	GF	GA	GD
La Liga	66	44	27	12	5	84	37	+47
Copa del Rey	–	6	4	1	1	15	7	+8
European Cup	–	8	4	0	4	12	10	+2
Total		58	35	13	10	111	54	+57

=== Players statistics ===
No.	Pos	Nat	Player	Total		La Liga		Copa del Rey		European Cup	
No.	Pos	Nat	Player	Apps	Goals	Apps	Goals	Apps	Goals	Apps	Goals
	GK	(Spain) ESP	Buyo	58	-54	44	-37	6	-7	8	-10
	DF	(Spain) ESP	Chendo	54	0	40	0	6	0	8	0
	DF	(Spain) ESP	Sanchis	49	3	36	2	6	0	7	1
	DF	(Spain) ESP	Solana	45	2	27+7	2	4+2	0	2+3	0
	DF	(Spain) ESP	Camacho	42	0	32	0	2	0	8	0
	MF	(Spain) ESP	Míchel	58	6	44	5	6	1	8	0
	MF	(Spain) ESP	Gallego	49	2	37	2	5	0	7	0
	MF	(Spain) ESP	Gordillo	50	7	35+1	5	6	2	8	0
	FW	(Spain) ESP	Butragueño	45	19	35	11	3	3	7	5
	FW	(Argentina) ARG	Valdano	33	9	27	7	2	1	4	1
	FW	(Mexico) MEX	Sánchez	54	43	41	34	6	6	7	3
	GK	(Spain) ESP	Agustin	0	0	0	0				
	DF	(Spain) ESP	Salguero	36	1	23+5	1	4	0	4	0
	MF	(Spain) ESP	Vázquez	36	5	17+8	5	4+1	0	2+4	0
	FW	(Spain) ESP	Pardeza	32	6	12+13	5	2+3	1	0+2	0
	DF	(Spain) ESP	Mino	19	1	12+4	1	1+1	0	1	0
	FW	(Spain) ESP	Juanito	33	1	10+15	1	2+1	0	3+2	0
	MF	(Socialist Federal Republic of Yugoslavia) YUG	Janković	9	1	9	1				
	FW	(Spain) ESP	Santillana	25	4	3+15	1	1+1	1	4+1	2
	GK	(Spain) ESP	Otxotorena	0	0	0	0				
	DF	(Spain) ESP	Maceda	0	0	0	0				
	FW	(Spain) ESP	Cholo	0	0	0	0				

- Source: https://www.bdfutbol.com/en/t/t1986-872.html

== See also ==
La Quinta del Buitre
