= 1993–94 Rayo Vallecano season =

Rayo Vallecano
1993–94 season
- Owner: José María Ruiz-Mateos
- President: José María Ruiz-Mateos (until 11 January 1994); Teresa Rivero
- Head coach: Felines (until 31 October 1993); Fernando Zambrano (until 5 February 1994); David Vidal
- Stadium: Campo Vallecas
- La Liga: 17th (relegated to Segunda Division)
- Copa del Rey: 4th round
- Top goalscorer: League: Hugo Sánchez (16); All: Hugo Sánchez (17)
Home colours	Away colours	Third colours
- All statistics correct as of 11 April 2022.

The 1993–94 season is the 70th season in the existence of Rayo Vallecano and the club's first season back in the top flight of Spanish football. In addition to the domestic league, Rayo Vallecano participated in this season's edition of the Copa del Rey.

== Summary ==
During summer José Antonio Camacho left the club after the end of his contract to take the charge of RCD Español prompting José María Ruiz-Mateos to appoint club legend Felines as its new head coach. The club transferred in several players such as Pichichi trophy 5-times-winner Hugo Sánchez seeking to replace Anton Polster who was transferred out to FC Köln, midfielder Orehuela from Atlético Madrid, Onesimo and young striker Ismael Urzaiz from Celta Vigo.

After a bad streak of results, President Ruiz Mateos sacked head coach Felines and appointed Fernando Zambrano on 31 October 1993 however, the squad still lost the path in League even with the appointing of Teresa Rivero as new club president, the first woman in that charge in La Liga history who fired Zambrano on 4 February 1994 replacing him with David Vidal for the rest of the season. The team felt below to a Relegation Playoff against SD Compostela descending to 1994-95 Segunda Division after three matches.

== Squad ==
Note: Flags indicate national team as defined under FIFA eligibility rules; some limited exceptions apply. Players may hold more than one non-FIFA nationality.

No.	Pos.	Nation	Player
—	GK	NGR	Wilfred
—	DF	ESP	Cota
—	DF	ESP	Josete
—	DF	ESP	Miguel
—	DF	ESP	Alex
—	MF	ESP	Pablo
—	MF	ESP	Calderón
—	MF	YUG	Višnjić
—	MF	ESP	Orejuela
—	FW	ESP	Onesimo
—	FW	MEX	Hugo Sánchez

No.	Pos.	Nation	Player
—	GK	ESP	Carou
—	DF	ESP	Lema
—	DF	ESP	Ayarza
—	DF	ESP	Momparlet
—	DF	ESP	Alcazar
—	FW	ESP	Urzaiz
—	FW	ESP	Rodriguez
—	DF	ESP	Palacios
—	MF	ESP	Delgado
—	MF	ESP	Aguado
—	MF	ESP	Gallego
—	MF	ESP	Fernando
—	MF	ESP	Michel
—	FW	ESP	Josemi

=== Transfers ===
In
Pos.	Name	from	Type
FW	Hugo Sánchez	Club América	-
MF	Antonio Orejuela	Atlético Madrid	-
DF	Alex García	FC Barcelona B	-
MF	Onésimo Sánchez	Real Valladolid	-
FW	Ismael Urzaiz	Celta Vigo	-
FW	Eduardo Rodriguez	Hercules CF	-
DF	Luis Alcazar	Sporting de Gijón	-
MF	Luis Delgado	RCD Mallorca	-

Out
Pos.	Name	To	Type
FW	Anton Polster	FC Köln	-
DF	Paco Jemez	Deportivo La Coruña	-
FW	Pedro Riesco	Deportivo La Coruña	-
MF	Pizo Gómez	Atlético Madrid	-
GK	Antonio Jimenez Sistachs	RCD Español	-
DF	Rafael García Cortés		retired

== Competitions ==
=== La Liga ===
==== League table ====
Pos	Team	Pld	W	D	L	GF	GA	GD	Pts	Qualification or relegation
15	Celta Vigo	38	11	11	16	41	51	−10	33 (Note: CEL 2–0 LOG; LOG 1–1 CEL)	
16	Logroñés	38	9	15	14	47	58	−11	33	
17	Rayo Vallecano (R)	38	9	13	16	40	58	−18	31	Qualification for the relegation playoffs
18	Valladolid (O)	38	8	14	16	28	51	−23	30	Qualification for the relegation playoffs
19	Lleida (R)	38	7	13	18	29	48	−19	27	Relegation to the Segunda División

Source: LFP
Rules for classification: 1) points; 2) head-to-head points; 3) head-to-head goal difference; 4) head-to-head goals scored; 5) goal difference; 6) number of goals scored.
(O) Play-off winners; (R) Relegated

==== Results by round ====
Round	1	2	3	4	5	6	7	8	9	10	11	12	13	14	15	16	17	18	19	20	21	22	23	24	25	26	27	28	29	30	31	32	33	34	35	36	37	38
Ground	A	H	A	H	H	A	H	A	H	A	H	A	H	A	H	A	H	A	H	H	A	H	A	A	H	A	H	A	H	A	H	A	H	A	H	A	H	A
Result	L	W	W	L	W	L	D	L	L	L	W	D	L	L	W	W	D	L	W	D	L	L	D	D	D	D	W	L	W	D	D	L	L	D	L	D	D	L
Position	16	13	7	11	9	10	9	13	14	16	15	13	15	17	15	14	14	16	15	15	16	17	17	16	16	16	15	16	14	14	13	14	16	17	17	17	16	17

Updated to match(es) played on 12 December. Source: Competitive Matches
A = Away; H = Home; W = Win; D = Draw; L = Loss; = Leader, 1994-95 UEFA Champions League; = 1994-95 UEFA Cup; = relegation playoffs; = 1994-95 Segunda División

==== Matches ====
5 September 1993 1	Racing Santander	1–0	Rayo Vallecano	Santander
	Pineda 53'	Report		Stadium: El Sardinero; Referee: Bello Blanco

12 September 1993 2	Rayo Vallecano	4–3	CD Tenerife	Puente de Vallecas
	Calderón 33'; Sánchez 36'; Sánchez 73' (yellow card); Pablo 88'	Report	28' Latorre; 35' Chano; Felipe (yellow card) 69' (yellow-red card) 89' Pier	Stadium: Campo Vallecas; Referee: Pajares Paz

17 September 1993 3	UE Lleida	0–1	Rayo Vallecano	Lleida
		Report	64' Sánchez; (yellow card) 66' (yellow-red card) Alcazar	Stadium: Camp d'Esports; Referee: Rivas Fernandez

26 September 1993 4	Rayo Vallecano	1–2	Athletic Club	Puente de Vallecas
	Sánchez 36' (pen.) (yellow card); Višnjić (yellow card) 86' (yellow-red card)	Report	2' Ziganda; 14' Ziganda; Eskurza (red card) 51'	Stadium: Campo Vallecas; Referee: Garcia de Losa

3 October 1993 5	Rayo Vallecano	3–1	CD Logroñés	Vallecas
	Onesimo 26'; Mandía 46' (own goal); Sánchez 85' (yellow card)	Report	27' Paco	Stadium: Campo Vallecas; Referee: Brito Arceo

6 October 1993 6	Valencia CF	3–1	Rayo Vallecano	Valencia
	Penev (penalty missed) 45'; Pizzi 46'; Arroyo 52'; Eloy 89'	Report	44' Orejuela	Stadium: Mestalla; Referee: Perez Sánchez

17 October 1993 7	Rayo Vallecano	1–1	Celta Vigo	Vallecas
	Pablo 99'	Report	66' Salva	Stadium: Campo Vallecas; Referee: Andujar Oliver

24 October 1993 8	Sporting de Gijón	2–0	Rayo Vallecano	Gijón
	Muñiz 32'; Stanic 88'	Report		Stadium: El Molinon; Referee: Gomez

30 October 1993 9	Rayo Vallecano	0–2	Real Madrid	Vallecas
		Report	Zamorano 26'; Zamorano 76'	Stadium: Campo Vallecas; Referee: Antonio Navarrente

6 November 1993 10	Sevilla CF	3–1	Rayo Vallecano	Seville
	Simeone 30'; Carvajal 86'; Suker 88'	Report	59' Pablo	Stadium: Sánchez Pizjuán; Referee: Diaz Vega

10 November 1993 11	Rayo Vallecano	4–1	Real Sociedad	Vallecas
	Orejuela 12'; Sánchez 47'; Orejuela 49'; Calderón 89'	Report	84' Alkiza	Stadium: Campo Vallecas; Referee: Ansuategui Roca

20 November 1993 12	Albacete Balompie	1–1	Rayo Vallecano	Madrid
	Menendez 86'	Report	88' Sánchez; Pablo (yellow card) 88' (yellow-red card)	Stadium: Estadio Santiago Bernabéu; Referee: Rubio Valdivieso

27 November 1993 13	Rayo Vallecano	2–4	FC Barcelona	Vallecas
	Sánchez 30' (pen.); Sánchez 82' (pen.)	Report	20' Amor; 37' (pen.) Koeman; 58' Koeman; 76' Amor	Stadium: Campo Vallecas; Referee: Garcia de Loza

4 December 1993 14	Real Zaragoza	4–1	Rayo Vallecano	Zaragoza
	Higuera 41'; Pardeza 45'; Higuera 66'; Poyet 84'	Report	13' Alcazar; 86' Sánchez	Stadium: La Romareda; Referee: Perez Sánchez

11 December 1993 15	Rayo Vallecano	1–0	Osasuna	Vallecas
	Rodriguez 83'	Report		Stadium: Campo Vallecas; Referee: Pajares Paz

18 December 1993 16	Real Valladolid	1–3	Rayo Vallecano	Valladolid
	Amavisca 36'	Report	8' Sánchez; (red card) 25' Cesar; 48' Delgado; 58' (pen.) Sánchez	Stadium: Jose Zorrilla; Referee: Diaz Vega

1 January 1994 17	Rayo Vallecano	0–0	Deportivo La Coruña	Vallecas
		Report		Stadium: Campo Vallecas; Referee: Navarrete

7 January 1994 18	Real Oviedo	5–0	Rayo Vallecano	Oviedo
	Andrades 30'; Carlos 57'; Carlos 59'; Carlos 88'; Maqueda 89'	Report		Stadium: Carlos Tartiere; Referee: Bello Blanco

16 January 1994 19	Rayo Vallecano	2–1	Atlético Madrid	Madrid
	Višnjić 10'; Onésimo 40'; Sánchez 70'	Report	Kosecki 49'	Stadium: Nuevo Estadio de Vallecas

22 January 1994 20	Rayo Vallecano	1–1	Racing Santander	Vallecas
	Pablo 67'	Report	42' Popov	Stadium: Campo Vallecas; Referee: Urio Velazquez

29 January 1994 21	CD Tenerife	3–1	Rayo Vallecano	Santa Cruz de Tenerife
	Dertycia 29'; Del Solar 44'; Pier 83'	Report	35' Sánchez	Referee: Andujar Oliver

4 February 1994 22	Rayo Vallecano	1–2	UE Lleida	Vallecas
	Calderón 84'	Report	23' Virgilio; Quesada 34'; (yellow card) 53' (yellow-red card) Txerna	Stadium: Campo Vallecas; Referee: Rivas Fernandez

12 February 1994 23	Athletic Club	0–0	Rayo Vallecano	Bilbao
		Report		Stadium: San Mamés

18 February 1994 24	CD Logroñes	1–1	Rayo Vallecano	Logroño
	Jose Ignacio 9'	Report	18' (yellow card) Sánchez	Stadium: Las Gaunas; Referee: Navarrete

22 February 1994 25	Rayo Vallecano	1–1	Valencia CF	Vallecas
	Sánchez (yellow card) 50' (yellow-red card); Onesimo 76'	Report	70' Quique Sánchez Flores	Stadium: Campo Vallecas; Referee: Lopez Nieto

26 February 1994 26	Celta Vigo	0–0	Rayo Vallecano	Vigo
		Report		Stadium: Balaidos; Referee: Juan Marin

5 March 1994 27	Rayo Vallecano	2–1	Sporting de Gijón	Vallecas
	Calderón 55'; Sánchez 88'	Report	34' Sabou	Stadium: Campo Vallecas; Referee: Gracia Redondo

11 March 1994 28	Real Madrid	5–2	Rayo Vallecano	Madrid
	Prosinecki 5' (pen.); Prosinecki 87' Hierro 40'; Hierro 89'; Butragueño 50'; Velasco (yellow card)	Report	Onesimo 45'; Onesimo 86'; Lema (yellow card); Calderón (yellow card)	Stadium: Estadio Santiago Bernabéu; Referee: José Sánchez

19 March 1994 29	Rayo Vallecano	2–1	Sevilla CF	Vallecas
	Onesimo 35'; Sánchez 85' (pen.)	Report	(yellow card) 41' (yellow-red card) Simeone; 49' Diego; (yellow card) 86' (yellow-red card) Martagon	Stadium: Campo Vallecas; Referee: Rubio Valdivieso

25 March 1994 30	Real Sociedad	1–1	Rayo Vallecano	San Sebastián
	Kodro 42' (pen.)	Report	64' Calderón	Stadium: Anoeta; Referee: Pajares Paz

1 April 1994 31	Rayo Vallecano	0–0	Albacete Balompie	Vallecas
	Onesimo (yellow card) 89' (yellow-red card)	Report	(yellow card) 79' (yellow-red card) Delfi Geli	Stadium: Campo Vallecas; Referee: Bello Blanco

5 April 1994 32	FC Barcelona	1–0	Rayo Vallecano	Barcelona
	Ivan Iglesias 82'	Report	(penalty missed) 15' Calderón; (red card) 44' Rodriguez	Stadium: Camp Nou; Referee: Lopez Nieto

8 April 1994 33	Rayo Vallecano	1–2	Real Zaragoza	Vallecas
	Sánchez 16'; Urzaiz 46'	Report	51' Nayim; 79' Poyet	Stadium: Campo Vallecas; Referee: Gomez Lopez

16 April 1994 34	Osasuna	1–1	Rayo Vallecano	Pamplona
	Palacios 67'	Report	51' Onesimo	Stadium: El Sadar; Referee: Ansuategui Roca

23 April 1994 35	Rayo Vallecano	0–1	Real Valladolid	Vallecas
	Pablo 20'	Report	65' (own goal) Momparlet	Stadium: Campo Vallecas; Referee: Garcia de Loza

30 April 1994 36	Deportivo La Coruña	0–0	Rayo Vallecano	A Coruña
		Report		Stadium: Riazor; Referee: Gracia Redondo

6 May 1994 37	Rayo Vallecano	0–0	Real Oviedo	Vallecas
	Alex (yellow card) 45' (yellow-red card)	Report		Stadium: Campo Vallecas; Referee: Merino Gonzalez

15 May 1994 38	Atlético Madrid	2–0	Rayo Vallecano	Madrid
	Kiko 86'; Manolo 88'	Report		Stadium: Vicente Calderón Stadium; Referee: Celino Gracia Redondo

==== Relegation playoff ====
22 May 1994	Rayo Vallecano	1-1	SD Compostela	Puente de Vallecas
	Sánchez (penalty missed) 15'; Urzaiz 44'	Report	31' Ohen	Referee: Ansuategui Roca

28 May 1994	SD Compostela	0-0	Rayo Vallecano	Santiago de Compostela
	Nacho (yellow card) 80' (yellow-red card)	Report	(red card) 60' Onesimo	Stadium: San Lázaro; Referee: Rubio Valdivieso

1 June 1994 Tie Breaker	SD Compostela	3-1	Rayo Vallecano	Oviedo
	Ohen 16'; Ohen 53'; Jose 88'	Report	56' Višnjić; (red card) 72' Sánchez	Stadium: Carlos Tartiere; Referee: Diaz Vega

=== Copa del Rey ===
==== Third round ====
16 September 1993	CD Corralejo	3-3	Rayo Vallecano
		Report

23 September 1993	Rayo Vallecano	4-0	CD Corralejo
		Report

==== Fourth round ====
12 October 1993	CP Mérida	1-0	Rayo Vallecano

14 November 1993	Rayo Vallecano	1-1	CP Mérida
		Report

== Statistics ==
=== Player statistics ===
No.	Pos	Nat	Player	Total		1993-94 La Liga		1993-94 Copa del Rey	
No.	Pos	Nat	Player	Apps	Goals	Apps	Goals	Apps	Goals
	GK	(Nigeria) NGR	Wilfred	34	-54	32	-50	2	-4
	DF	(Spain) ESP	Cota	39	1	35	0	4	1
	DF	(Spain) ESP	Josete	27	0	24+1	0	2	0
	DF	(Spain) ESP	Miguel	33	0	27+4	0	2	0
	DF	(Spain) ESP	Alex	25	0	18+4	0	3	0
	MF	(Spain) ESP	Pablo	39	4	34+1	4	3+1	0
	MF	(Spain) ESP	Calderón	37	5	32+3	5	0+2	0
	MF	(Federal Republic of Yugoslavia) YUG	Višnjić	34	1	27+3	1	4	0
	MF	(Spain) ESP	Orejuela	33	3	26+3	3	4	0
	FW	(Spain) ESP	Onesimo	39	7	32+3	7	4	0
	FW	(Mexico) MEX	Hugo Sánchez	30	17	29	16	1	1
	GK	(Spain) ESP	Carou	8	-9	6	-8	2	-1
	DF	(Spain) ESP	Lema	25	1	17+6	0	2	1
	DF	(Spain) ESP	Ayarza	19	0	17+1	0	1	0
	DF	(Spain) ESP	Momparlet	14	0	13+1	0		
	DF	(Spain) ESP	Alcazar	16	1	13	0	3	1
	FW	(Spain) ESP	Urzaiz	23	4	10+10	1	3	3
	FW	(Spain) ESP	Rodriguez	24	1	8+16	1		
	DF	(Spain) ESP	Palacios	13	0	7+4	0	2	0
	MF	(Spain) ESP	Delgado	17	1	6+8	1	2+1	0
	MF	(Spain) ESP	Aguado	3	0	3	0		
	MF	(Spain) ESP	Gallego	3	0	1+2	0		
	MF	(Spain) ESP	Fernando	1	0	1	0		
	MF	(Spain) ESP	Michel	2	0	0+1	0	0+1	0
	FW	(Spain) ESP	Josemi	2	1	0	0	0+2	1

- Source: https://www.bdfutbol.com/en/t/t1993-945.html
