= Hugo Sánchez =

Mexican footballer and manager (born 1958)

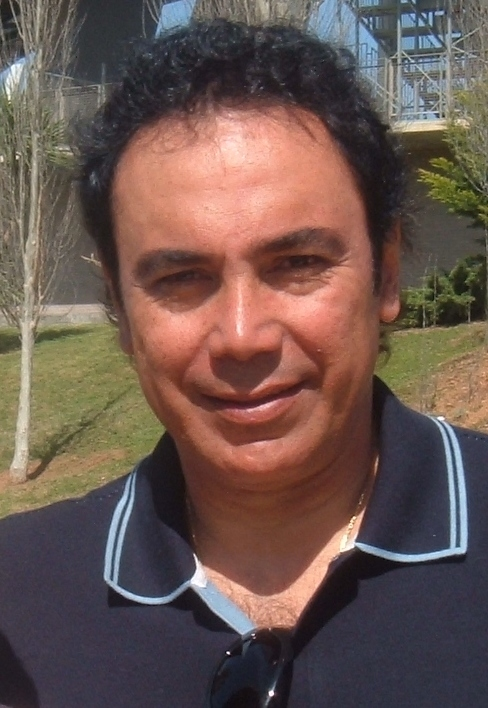
- Sánchez in 2008

Personal information
- Full name: Hugo Sánchez Márquez
- Date of birth: 11 July 1958 (age 68)
- Place of birth: Mexico City, Mexico
- Height: 1.74 m (5 ft 9 in)
- Position: Forward

Youth career
- 1969–1976: Pumas UNAM

Senior career*
Years	Team	Apps	(Gls)
1976–1982	Pumas UNAM	188	(97)
1979–1980	→ San Diego Sockers (loan)	32	(26)
1981–1982	→ Atlético Madrid (loan)	20	(8)
1982–1985	Atlético Madrid	91	(46)
1985–1992	Real Madrid	207	(164)
1992–1993	América	29	(11)
1993–1994	Rayo Vallecano	29	(16)
1994–1995	Atlante	31	(13)
1995–1996	Stahl Linz	18	(6)
1996	Dallas Burn	23	(7)
1997	Atlético Celaya	11	(2)
Total		679	(396)

International career
1977–1994	Mexico	58	(29)

Managerial career
- 2000: Pumas UNAM
- 2000: Mexico (interim)
- 2001–2005: Pumas UNAM
- 2006: Necaxa
- 2006–2008: Mexico
- 2008: Mexico U23
- 2008–2009: Almería
- 2012: Pachuca
Medal record
Men's football
Representing Mexico
Copa América
Runner-up	1993 Ecuador
CONCACAF Championship
Winner	1977 Mexico
Third place	1981 Honduras
Pan American Games
Winner	1975 Mexico
CONCACAF Pre-Olympic Tournament
Winner	1976 North America
- * Club domestic league appearances and goals

Hugo Sánchez Márquez (born 11 July 1958) is a Mexican former professional footballer and manager, who played as a forward. A prolific goal scorer known for his spectacular strikes and volleys, he is widely regarded as the greatest Mexican footballer of all time, one of the best players of his generation, and one of the greatest strikers of all time. In 1999, the International Federation of Football History and Statistics voted Sánchez the 26th best footballer of the 20th century, and the best footballer from the CONCACAF region. In 2004, Sánchez was named in the FIFA 100 list of the world's greatest living players.

Sánchez is regarded as one of La Liga's best foreign imports, and one of Real Madrid's top strikers of all time. He is the fifth highest scorer in the history of La Liga, the fourth highest scoring foreign player after Cristiano Ronaldo, Lionel Messi, and Karim Benzema, and is the seventh highest goal scorer in Real Madrid's history. He scored a total of 562 senior career goals for both club and country in 956 matches, amassing a total of five Pichichi top goal scorer trophies in Spain.

Beginning his career at Pumas UNAM in 1976, he briefly went on loan to the San Diego Sockers of the North American Soccer League in 1979, during the Mexican League's off-season period. In 1981, he moved to Spain to play for Atlético Madrid, playing for the Colchoneros for four years before moving to cross-town rivals Real Madrid, where he would spend the best years of his career, winning numerous titles and accolades.

From 1977 to 1994, Sánchez was a member of the national team, gaining 58 caps and scoring 29 goals. He participated in three FIFA World Cup tournaments and was a part of the Mexico team that reached the quarter-finals of the 1986 World Cup. Famous for his acrobatic goal celebrations throughout his club and international career, Sánchez was the first notable exponent of the backflip.

As a manager, he won two consecutive league championships with Pumas UNAM. After managing Necaxa, he was announced as coach of the Mexico national football team in 2006, but was fired in March 2008 due to poor results. In 2009, Sánchez was named manager of Almería, and helped to save the club from relegation.

== Club career ==
=== Pumas UNAM ===
As a teenager, Sánchez played for the Mexico national football team at the 1976 Summer Olympics. Having already played in over 80 international matches, Sánchez signed as a youth player at the age of 18 for Pumas UNAM, a professional team representing Mexico's national university, where he completed a degree in Dentistry while playing for the first team. Later that year, Pumas UNAM managed to win its first championship in the Primera División. Two years later, he became the league's top-scorer with 26 goals.

In 1979, Pumas UNAM agreed to exchange players during the off-season with the San Diego Sockers of the North American Soccer League (NASL). He played in the NASL during the summer and in the Mexican league during the fall, winter and spring. Pumas UNAM loaned Sánchez to the Sockers in 1979 and 1980 where he became a prolific striker for the Sockers, averaging nearly a goal a game.

Sánchez's five seasons with Pumas UNAM were during the team's golden years. In 1980–81, his last season with the club, Sánchez and Pumas UNAM won its second league championship, a CONCACAF Champions Cup and a Copa Interamericana. During his five years with Pumas UNAM, Sánchez scored 104 goals in 200 appearances.

With Hugo's exemplary performances in the Toulon Tournament and 1975 Cannes Youth Tournament, he earned his nickname Niño de Oro (Golden Boy).

=== Atlético Madrid ===
After five successful seasons in Mexico, Sánchez drew the attention of several European sides, including that of English club Arsenal, though eventually signing with Spanish side Atlético Madrid in 1981. It took him a while to find his feet in La Liga, only managing twenty league appearances and scoring eight goals in his first season, but by the 1984–1985 season he was scoring regularly with a team that won the Copa del Rey, finished second in the league and won the Spanish Super Copa. That year, Sánchez won his first Pichichi Trophy for being the most prolific scorer in the league, scoring 26 goals.

=== Real Madrid ===
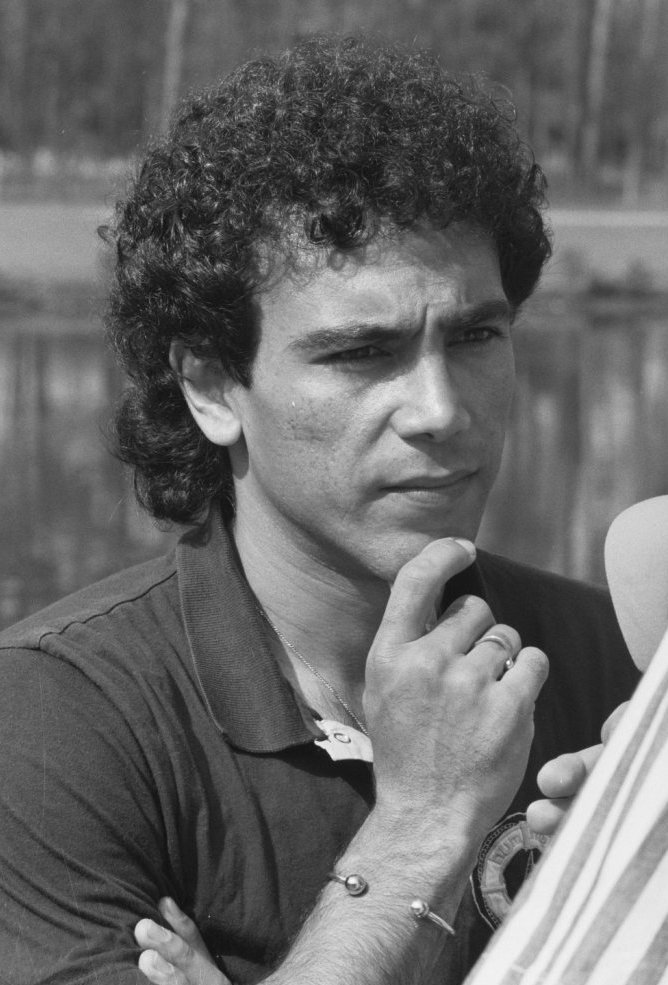
Sánchez in 1988

On 15 July 1985, Sánchez signed for La Liga club Real Madrid. It was reported that due to Atlético Madrid's reluctance to anger their fan base with a direct deal with Real, Sánchez was transferred to Pumas UNAM back in his home country on 4 July before being signed by Real Madrid, with the contract signing taking place in a bank in Mexico City. He was flown back to Spain and presented to 50,000 fans at the Santiago Bernabéu Stadium on 19 July.

He played alongside the famed group of players known as the La Quinta del Buitre ("Vulture's Cohort"), which consisted of Emilio Butragueño, Manuel Sanchís, Martín Vázquez, Míchel, and Miguel Pardeza. With Los Blancos, Sánchez won five consecutive league titles from 1985 to 1990, a Copa del Rey title in 1989 and the UEFA Cup in 1986. During those five years, Sánchez won four-consecutive Pichichi trophies, becoming one of two players in Spanish football history to achieve this without sharing the trophy with any other player in any season (the other being Lionel Messi with 5 consecutive Pichichi awards between 2017 and 2021), and one of four players to win five Pichichis (the others being Alfredo Di Stéfano, Quini and Messi (who has won 8)), scoring 208 goals in 283 games in all competitions. He scored 27 or more goals in four consecutive seasons between 1986 and 1990, including 38 goals in the 1989–90 season, tying the single-season record set in 1951 by Telmo Zarra and earning the European Golden Boot award for the best scorer in Europe. Remarkably, all 38 of these goals were scored with only a single touch. His 38-goal tally stood as a league record until Cristiano Ronaldo surpassed it after scoring 40 goals in the 2010–11 season. In European Cup competitions, Sánchez scored 27 goals in 46 matches.

=== Later career ===
In 1992, Sánchez returned to his native Mexico for a season and there he won the 1992 CONCACAF Champions' Cup with Club América before playing for a variety of clubs in Spain, Austria and the United States. He played for Dallas Burn in the inaugural year of Major League Soccer, becoming one of two footballers, along with Roy Wegerle, to play outdoor football in both the NASL and Major League Soccer (MLS). He finished his career playing for Atlético Celaya, along with Butragueño and Míchel, his old colleagues from Real Madrid.

=== Retirement ===
Sánchez retired from Spanish football on 29 May 1997, playing with Real Madrid at the Santiago Bernabéu Stadium. His last official game was during the 1998 World Cup qualifiers, where he touched the ball as a symbol of his retirement.

== International career ==
Sánchez with his son Hugo during the 1986 FIFA World Cup

Sánchez made 58 appearances for Mexico between 1977 and 1994, scoring 29 goals. Prior to representing the senior side, as a teenager he represented Mexico at the 1975 Pan American Games on home soil, where he won a gold medal, and at the 1976 Summer Olympics. He participated in three FIFA World Cup tournaments, making eight World Cup appearances in total, and scoring once. Also, with Chilean Elías Figueroa holds the unique distinction of playing in three alternate tournaments 1978-1986-1994. He helped Mexico win the 1977 CONCACAF Championship to seal qualification for the 1978 FIFA World Cup in Argentina; at the age of 19, he took part in the final tournament, where Mexico lost all three of their group games and suffered a first round elimination.

After Mexico failed to qualify for the 1982 FIFA World Cup in Spain, Sánchez was a part of the Mexico team that reached the quarter-finals of the 1986 World Cup on home soil, losing out to eventual runners-up West Germany in a penalty shootout. He scored his only World Cup goal during his nation's opening match of the tournament on 3 June, the winning goal in a 2–1 victory over Belgium, although he also missed a penalty in Mexico's second group match against Paraguay, and was later booked, causing him to miss the final group match. Four years later, however, Mexico once again missed out on the final tournament as they were suspended from the 1990 FIFA World Cup in Italy.

Despite his advancing age, he later played a key role in helping Mexico to the final of the 1993 Copa América, at the age of 35; he scored once in a 2–0 victory over Ecuador in the semi-finals, although Mexico eventually finished as runners-up to Argentina. Sánchez later also appeared at the 1994 FIFA World Cup in the United States, his final major tournament, where Mexico suffered a round of 16 elimination; he made his only appearance in the tournament on 19 June, in Mexico's opening match of the competition, a 1–0 defeat to Norway.

== Managerial career ==
=== Club ===
In March 2000, Sánchez became manager of Pumas UNAM, who were struggling in the league, signing a two-year deal. Although the team went on to have a good campaign under his leadership, differences between the club president and Sánchez resulted in his sacking in August of that year.

After Jimenez Espriu resigned as the club president a year later, the new president, Luis Regueiro, appointed Sánchez as head coach in November 2001.

After building his team up for a number of years, by 2004 Sánchez' Pumas had won everything they played in: Clausura 2004, Apertura 2004, Champion of Champions 2004 and the Santiago Bernabéu Trophy. He also became the only manager in history to lead a Mexican team to two consecutive championships in the Mexican Primera División in the "short tournament" format.

The success, however, was short lived. Pumas became the worst team of the tournament the following season and in Winter 2005 were having the worst year in its history. Sánchez decided to resign in November 2005.

Club Necaxa, another Mexican team, signed him as a head coach in 2006, and he also became the coach of the Mexico national team that year following their participation at the 2006 FIFA World Cup.

He became coach of La Liga's Almería in early 2009, but after accomplishing the goal of avoiding relegation from La Liga, and despite on 2 June 2009 the Almeria chairman Alfonso García announcing the renewal of his contract, he was released on 20 December 2009.

=== Mexico ===
After briefly managing Club Necaxa, Sánchez was named head coach of the Mexico national team, with the aim of leading Mexico through the qualification process for the 2010 World Cup in South Africa.

During his coaching career especially, Sánchez became known for his volatile temperament and his willingness to speak candidly, often expressing strong emotions and opinions, a trait that engenders equally emotional and strong responses from those he criticizes. He had a long-standing feud with the previous Mexico coach, Ricardo La Volpe.

Sánchez's first match as Mexico coach was a 2–0 loss to the United States in Phoenix, Arizona in February 2007. Sánchez recorded his first victory against Venezuela, a 3–1 win in front of 67,000 fans in San Diego. Hugo's first game in Mexico took place against Paraguay in Monterrey on 25 March 2007, which Mexico won 2–1. A few days later on 28 March 2007, Mexico defeated Ecuador 4–2 in Oakland, California.

In June 2007, Sánchez coached Mexico in the 2007 edition of the Gold Cup, his first official competition. After struggling in the first stages of the tournament, México reached the final 24 June 2007 and lost 2–1 against the US.

On 27 June 2007, in the opening game of the 2007 Copa América held in Venezuela, Sánchez led the Mexico national team to a stunning 2–0 win Brazil, Hugo's first major victory as a coach. After easing through the group stage of the tournament, Hugo led the team to the semi-finals (beating Paraguay 6–0 in the quarter-finals) where they were beaten 3–0 by Argentina. Mexico ended the tournament in third place by defeating Uruguay 3–1.

In August 2007, Sánchez announced that Mexico would permanently, or at least in his time coaching the team, drop their famous green home kit, replacing it with their white away kit, meaning that their new away kit would be red. For this decision, Sánchez was subject of a lot of criticism. The two main arguments against him were that the decision was breaking a long-standing Mexican tradition, yet the strongest critics suggested that he should devote more time to the strategy and training of the Mexico team rather than entertaining himself with superfluous features of the sport.

In March 2008, Sánchez suffered poor results, including draws with Australia and Finland, and a loss at home in Querétaro against Ecuador's U-23 team. Disappointing results continued in the CONCACAF Olympic Qualification, a draw with Canada and a loss to Guatemala. His only victory was a 5–1 win against Haiti. Mexico were eliminated from the Pre-Olympic qualifying tournament on goal difference.

On 31 March 2008, Hugo Sánchez was fired from his post as Mexico head coach.

== Style of play ==
"When a player scores a goal like that, play should be suspended and a glass of champagne offered to the 80,000 fans that witnessed it."

— Leo Beenhakker referring to Sánchez’s overhead kick goal against Logroñés in 1988.

Sánchez, nicknamed Hugol and Pentapichichi, played primarily as a centre-forward . He was known for his movement, positioning, and finishing in the penalty area, and scored the majority of his goals from close range with relatively few touches of the ball.

Due to his athleticism, Sánchez was good in the air, despite his diminutive stature, and was also known for his ability to score acrobatic and flamboyant goals from spectacular strikes and volleys from any position on the pitch, both inside or outside the area; his mastery of the "Chilena", or "Bicycle kick", was a result of his own early training in gymnastics, and his goals scored in this manner were later dubbed Huguinas. His trademark was to perform a celebratory somersault followed by a fist pump after each goal he scored, in honour of his sister, who was a gymnast and participated in the Montreal Olympics. Sánchez is considered to be the first noted exponent of the backflip.

According to his FIFA profile, Sánchez is credited as the creator of the scorpion kick, which was later popularised by Colombian goalkeeper René Higuita. Though he regularly practised the trick in training, the Mexican striker never scored a goal with it in an official match.

An accurate penalty taker, Sánchez held the record for most penalties scored in La Liga with 56, until Cristiano Ronaldo broke the record in 2017 after scoring his 57th penalty-kick.

== Outside football ==
=== Personal life ===
Hugo Sánchez was raised in the Jardín Balbuena neighborhood in Mexico City to a middle-class family. His father, Héctor Sánchez, was also a footballer who played for Asturias F.C. and Atlante F.C. His sister, Herlinda Sánchez, was an Olympic gymnast who participated in the 1976 Summer Olympic Games in Montreal. Sánchez credits her for his acrobatic skills, including his signature somersault goal celebrations.

His son, Hugo Sánchez Portugal, was also a footballer and played for Pumas UNAM and Atlante. He also has two daughters from his current marriage. On 8 November 2014, Sánchez Portugal died from the effects of a gas leak in a Mexico City apartment as stated by the Mexican Red Cross.

In 2006, Sánchez was appointed as the official FIFA/SOS Ambassador for Mexico, joining Wayne Rooney (Ambassador for England), Ruud van Nistelrooy (Netherlands), and fifty others in fund raising for the official 2006 FIFA World Cup Charity.

On 1 September 2007, Sánchez inaugurated a street with his name in Puebla, central Mexico, before a thousand of the locals around there.

Sánchez holds a dental surgery degree from UNAM, though he never practiced the profession.

=== Media ===
As of January 2015, Sánchez was a commentator for ESPN in Mexico and the United States. He had previously served as a guest analyst during their coverage of the 2014 FIFA World Cup before featuring as a regular analyst. He was introduced as an Ultimate Team Icon in the video game, FIFA 20.

== Career statistics ==
=== Club ===
Appearances and goals by club, season and competition
Club	Season	League			Cup		Continental		Total	
Club	Season	Division	Apps	Goals	Apps	Goals	Apps	Goals	Apps	Goals
Pumas UNAM	1976–77	Mexican Primera División	27	7					27	7
Pumas UNAM	1977–78	Mexican Primera División	30	11					30	11
Pumas UNAM	1978–79	Mexican Primera División	45	28			2	0	47	28
Pumas UNAM	1979–80	Mexican Primera División	44	30					44	30
Pumas UNAM	1980–81	Mexican Primera División	42	21			7	5	49	26
Pumas UNAM	Total		188	97			9	5	197	102
San Diego Sockers (loan)	1979	NASL	17	12					17	12
San Diego Sockers (loan)	1980	NASL	15	14					15	14
San Diego Sockers (loan)	Total		32	26					32	26
Atlético Madrid (loan)	1981–82	La Liga	20	8	4	1	2	0	26	9
Atlético Madrid	1982–83	La Liga	31	15	4	3			39	22
Atlético Madrid	1983–84	La Liga	27	12	2	0	2	0	39	19
Atlético Madrid	1984–85	La Liga	33	19	8	6	2	1	47	29
Atlético Madrid	Total		111	54	18	10	6	1	151	79
Real Madrid	1985–86	La Liga	33	22	5	2	11	5	49	29
Real Madrid	1986–87	La Liga	41	34	6	6	7	3	54	43
Real Madrid	1987–88	La Liga	36	29	7	3	7	3	50	35
Real Madrid	1988–89	La Liga	35	27	6	4	7	5	50	37
Real Madrid	1989–90	La Liga	35	38	6	3	3	1	44	42
Real Madrid	1990–91	La Liga	19	12	1	1	3	5	25	19
Real Madrid	1991–92	La Liga	8	2	1	0	1	1	10	3
Real Madrid	Total		207	164	32	19	39	23	282	208
América	1992–93	Mexican Primera División	29	11			6	7	35	18
Rayo Vallecano	1993–94	La Liga	29	16	6	1			35	17
Atlante	1994–95	Mexican Primera División	31	13					31	13
Linz	1995–96	2. Liga	18	6	1	0			19	6
Dallas Burn	1996	Major League Soccer	23	7	2	1			25	8
Atlético Celaya	1996–97	Mexican Primera División	11	2					11	2
Real Madrid	1996–97	La Liga					1	3	1	3
Career total			679	396	81	50	61	39	819	485

=== International ===
Appearances and goals by national team and year
National team	Year	Apps	Goals
Mexico	1977	6	4
Mexico	1978	8	4
Mexico	1979	4	4
Mexico	1980	10	7
Mexico	1981	6	5
Mexico	1985	2	1
Mexico	1986	4	1
Mexico	1990	1	0
Mexico	1993	14	3
Mexico	1994	2	0
Mexico	1998	1	0
Total		58	29

Scores and results list Mexico's goal tally first, score column indicates score after each Sánchez goal.

List of international goals scored by Hugo Sánchez
No.	Date	Venue	Opponent	Score	Result	Competition
1	9 October 1977	Estadio Azteca, Mexico City, Mexico	Haiti	1–0	4–1	1977 CONCACAF Championship
2	15 October 1977	Estadio Universitario, San Nicolás de los Garza, Mexico	Suriname	1–0	8–1	1977 CONCACAF Championship
3	15 October 1977	Estadio Universitario, San Nicolás de los Garza, Mexico	Suriname	4–1	8–1	1977 CONCACAF Championship
4	22 October 1977	Estadio Universitario, San Nicolás de los Garza, Mexico	Canada	3–1	3–1	1977 CONCACAF Championship
5	5 February 1978	Estadio Cuscatlán, San Salvador, El Salvador	El Salvador	5–1	5–1	Friendly
6.	5 February 1978	Estadio Cuscatlán, San Salvador, El Salvador	El Salvador	5–1	5–1	Friendly
7.	5 February 1978	Estadio Cuscatlán, San Salvador, El Salvador	El Salvador	5–1	5–1	Friendly
8	3 May 1978	Helsinki Olympic Stadium, Helsinki, Finland	Finland	1–0	1–0	Friendly
9	6 January 1979	Estadio Universitario, San Nicolás de los Garza, Mexico	Soviet Union	1–0	1–0	Friendly
10	4 December 1979	Estadio Cuscatlán, San Salvador, El Salvador	El Salvador	1–0	2–0	Friendly
11	4 December 1979	Estadio Cuscatlán, San Salvador, El Salvador	El Salvador	2–0	2–0	Friendly
12	18 December 1979	Estadio Municipal, Texcoco, Mexico	El Salvador	1–1	1–1	Friendly
13	8 April 1980	Nemesio Diez Stadium, Toluca, Mexico	Honduras	1–0	5–1	Friendly
14	8 April 1980	Nemesio Diez Stadium, Toluca, Mexico	Honduras	5–1	5–1	Friendly
15	15 April 1980	Estadio Mateo Flores, Guatemala City, Guatemala	Guatemala	4–2	4–2	Friendly
16	29 April 1980	Nemesio Diez Stadium, Toluca, Mexico	Guatemala	1–1	2–2	Friendly
17	9 November 1980	Estadio Azteca, Mexico City, Mexico	United States	1–0	5–1	1981 CONCACAF Championship qualification
18	16 November 1980	Estadio Azteca, Mexico City, Mexico	Canada	1–0	1–1	1981 CONCACAF Championship qualification
19	23 November 1980	Lockhart Stadium, Fort Lauderdale, United States	United States	1–1	1–2	1981 CONCACAF Championship qualification
20	20 January 1981	Estadio Azteca, Mexico City, Mexico	Bulgaria	1–0	1–1	Friendly
21	23 June 1981	Estadio Azteca, Mexico City, Mexico	Spain	1–2	1–3	Friendly
22	1 November 1981	Estadio Tiburcio Carías Andino, Tegucigalpa, Honduras	Cuba	2–0	4–0	1981 CONCACAF Championship
23	1 November 1981	Estadio Tiburcio Carías Andino, Tegucigalpa, Honduras	Cuba	3–0	4–0	1981 CONCACAF Championship
24	11 November 1981	Estadio Tiburcio Carías Andino, Tegucigalpa, Honduras	Haiti	1–1	1–1	1981 CONCACAF Championship
25	25 August 1985	Los Angeles Memorial Coliseum, Los Angeles, United States	Chile	1–1	2–1	Friendly
26	3 June 1986	Estadio Azteca, Mexico City, Mexico	Belgium	2–0	2–1	1986 FIFA World Cup
27	11 April 1993	Estadio Azteca, Mexico City, Mexico	Honduras	2–0	3–0	1994 FIFA World Cup qualification
28	9 May 1993	Varsity Stadium, Toronto, Canada	Canada	1–1	2–1	1994 FIFA World Cup qualification
29	30 June 1993	Estadio Olímpico Atahualpa, Quito, Ecuador	Ecuador	1–0	2–0	1993 Copa América

== Managerial statistics ==
Last updated 17 June 2019

	Nat	From	To	Record							
G	Nat	From	To	Pld	W	L	D	Win %	GF	GA	+/-
Pumas UNAM^{1}	(Mexico)	2000	2000	14	7	4	3	50%	25	20	+5
Mexico^{2}	(Mexico)	2000	2000	3	1	1	1	33.3%	6	7	-1
Pumas UNAM^{3}	(Mexico)	2001	2005	192	82	60	50	41.67%	290	275	+15
Necaxa	(Mexico)	2006	2006	7	2	4	1	28.57%	8	11	-3
Mexico	(Mexico)	2006	2008	25	14	8	3	56%	43	29	+14
Mexico U23^{4}	(Mexico)	2008	2008	8	2	4	2	25%	10	6	+4
Almería^{5}	(Spain)	2008	2009	42	13	21	8	30.95%	49	69	-20
Pachuca^{6}	(Mexico)	2012	2012	24	9	7	8	37.5%	23	23	0
Career				315	130	109	76	41.27%	454	440	+14

^{1}Includes results from Liga MX
^{2}Includes only results from 2000 U.S. Cup
^{3}Includes results from Liga MX, Campeón de Campeones, 2003 Copa Libertadores, CONCACAF Champions' Cup 2005 and Trofeo Santiago Bernabeu
^{4}Includes results from 2008 CONCACAF Men's Pre-Olympic Tournament and under-23 international friendly matches
^{5}Includes results from La Liga, Copa del Rey and Trofeo Lagarto de Jaén
^{6}Includes results from Liga MX and Copa MX

== Honours ==
=== Player ===
Pumas UNAM

- Liga MX: 1976–77, 1980–81
- Liga MX Regular Season: 1976–77
- CONCACAF Champions' Cup: 1980
- Copa Interamericana: 1981

San Diego Sockers

- American Conference West Division: 1979

Atlético Madrid

- Copa del Rey: 1984–85
- Copa de la Liga runner-up: 1984
- Supercopa de España: 1985

Real Madrid

- La Liga: 1985–86, 1986–87, 1987–88, 1988–89, 1989–90
- Copa del Rey: 1988–89
- Copa de la Liga: 1985
- Supercopa de España: 1988, 1989, 1990
- UEFA Cup: 1985–86

América

- CONCACAF Champions' Cup: 1992

Linz

- First League: 1995–96

Mexico

- Copa América runner-up: 1993
- CONCACAF Championship: 1977
- Pan American Games: 1975
- CONCACAF Pre-Olympic Tournament: 1976
- CONCACAF U-20 Tournament: 1974, 1976

Individual

- CONCACAF Pre-Olympic Tournament Golden Boot: 1976
- Mexican Primera División Best Winger: 1977–78, 1978–79
- Mexican Primera División Golden Ball: 1978–79
- Mexican Primera División Golden Boot: 1978–79 (Shared)
- CONCACAF Championship Golden Boot: 1981
- CONCACAF Championship Team of the Tournament: 1981
- FIFA World Cup Qualification Bronze Boot: 1982
- FIFA XI: 1982
- Copa de la Liga Golden Boot: 1984
- La Liga Pichichi Trophy: 1984–85, 1985–86, 1986–87, 1987–88, 1989–90
- La Liga Team of The Year: 1985, 1986, 1987, 1988, 1990
- Copa del Rey Golden Boot: 1986–87
- Don Balón Award Best Foreign Player: 1986–87, 1989–90
- World Soccer World XI: 1987
- 1980'S Greatest XI Honorable Mention
- European Golden Shoe: 1989–90
- Real Madrid Legend
- CONCACAF Champions' Cup Golden Boot: 1992
- CONCACAF Team of the Century: 1998
- IFFHS Best Mexican Footballer of the 20th century
- IFFHS Best CONCACAF Footballer of the 20th century
- Premio Nacional del Deporte: 2004
- FIFA International Football Hall of Fame: 2011
- IFFHS CONCACAF 20th Century Men's Dream Team
- IFFHS CONCACAF Men's Team of All Time: 2021
- IFFHS Men's All Time Mexico Dream Team

=== Manager ===
Pumas UNAM

- Mexican Primera División Apertura: 2004
- Mexican Primera División Clausura: 2004
- Campeón de Campeones: 2004

Mexico

- Copa América third place: 2007
- CONCACAF Gold Cup runner-up: 2007

Individual

- Mexican Primera División Best Manager: 2003–04, 2004–05
- La Liga Best Replacement Manager: 2008–09

== Records ==
- Top Goalscorer of The Decade: 1980’s
- Most Bicycle Kicks In History: 38
- Top Non-European and Non-South American Goalscorer In History
- Highest Scoring North American Player of All Time
- Most Goals Scored In a Season With The First Touch: 38 In 1989–90
- Among the 20 Players with the Most Goals In First Division Leagues In History: 394 goals
- The Only Non-European or Non-South American Player to win the European Golden Boot
- La Liga Fifth All Time Goalscorer: 234 goals
- Fifth Player with The Most goals In a Single La Liga season: 38 In 1989–90
- Real Madrid Seventh All Time Goalscorer: 208 goals
- Real Madrid All Time Foreign Goalscorer (Until surpassed by Cristiano Ronaldo)
- Eleventh Player With The Most Goals In a Season In Europe's Top Five Leagues
- Highest Scoring Mexican and North American Player for Real Madrid
- One of 3 Players who have won the European Golden Shoe while playing for Real Madrid
- Most Bicycle Kick Goals for Real Madrid: 17
- One of 3 players who have scored the most goals in a single season more than once for Real Madrid
- Highest Scoring Mexican and North American Player In La Liga
- Highest Scoring Non-European and Non-South American Player In La Liga
- Most Hat-tricks By a North American Player In La Liga
- Most Hat-tricks By a Non-European and Non-South American Player In La Liga
- Highest Scoring Mexican Player of All Time
- Pumas UNAM Fourth All Time Scorer
- Sixth Highest Penalty Scorer In the History of Football
- Most Penalties Scored In a Single La Liga Season: 12
- Third Player With The Most Career Penalties In La Liga
- One of only 25 Players In History to surpass the 500-Goal Barrier
- Most Career Goals by a Mexican and North American Player In the UEFA Champions League
- Mexican player with the most matches played in Europe (until being surpassed by Andrés Guardado in 2023)
- Third Player with the Most La Liga Pichichi Trophies
- Second Player with the Most Consecutive La Liga Pichichi Trophies
- The Player With the Highest Number of Goals In a Season along with Telmo Zarra (Until surpassed by Cristiano Ronaldo, Luis Suárez, and Lionel Messi)
- The First and Only North American Player to win the La Liga Pichichi Trophy
- The First Non-European and Non-South American Player to win the La Liga Pichichi Trophy
- Copa de la Liga All-Time Top Goalscorer: 14 goals
- First Non-American to Play Outdoor Football In both the NASL and MLS
- One of Two Footballers to Play Outdoor Football In Both the NASL and MLS (along with Roy Wegerle)
- Most goals scored in a UEFA Champions League match for Real Madrid: 4 goals in 1990–91
- Sixth Fastest Goal In Real Madrid's History: 24 seconds against Sporting Gijón In 1986–87
- Most penalty kick goals in a season for Real Madrid: 14 in 1986–87
- Most league home wins in a season: 18 matches In 1987–88
- Most unbeaten matches in a season in La Liga: 39 matches In 1986–87
- Record away league win: 7–1 against Real Zaragoza In 1987–88
- Most home wins in a row (all competitions): 28, 2 June 1985 – 30 April 1986
- Most home league wins in a row: 24, 3 December 1988 – 28 January 1990
- Most home wins in a row in all competitions: 28 in 1985–86
- Most home wins in a season: 18 In 1987–88
- Most points in a season: 66 In 44 matches In 1986–87
- 100% home win record in a season: 17 games In 1985–86
- Most home league goals scored in a season: 78 In 1989–90

== See also ==
- List of men's footballers with 500 or more goals
