= 1992–93 Club América season =

América
1992–93 season
- Owner: Televisa
- President: Emilio Díez Barroso
- Manager: Miguel Angel Lopez
- Stadium: Estadio Azteca
- Liga MX: 4th Semifinals
- CONCACAF Champions' Cup: Winners
Home colours	Away colours

The 1992–93 Club América season is the club's 48th consecutive season in the top-flight of Mexican football. The team competed in the Liga MX and the CONCACAF Champions Cup.

== Squad ==
Note: Flags indicate national team as defined under FIFA eligibility rules; some limited exceptions apply. Players may hold more than one non-FIFA nationality.

No.	Pos.	Nation	Player
—	GK	MEX	Adrian Chavez
—	GK	MEX	Alejandro García
—	GK	MEX	Ángel Maldonado
—	DF	MEX	Juan Hernandez
—	DF	BRA	Geraldao
—	DF	MEX	Arturo Alvarez
—	DF	MEX	Guillermo Huerta
—	DF	ARG	Oscar Ruggeri
—	DF	MEX	Francisco Javier Sánchez
—	DF	MEX	Marco Sanchez Yacuta
—	DF	MEX	José Vaca
—	DF	URU	Cesilio de los Santos
—	MF	MEX	Edson Astivia
—	MF	MEX	Alberto García

No.	Pos.	Nation	Player
—	MF	ARG	Marcelo Barticciotto
—	MF	BRA	Bernardo
—	MF	MEX	Jesus Eduardo Cordova
—	MF	MEX	Gonzalo Farfan
—	MF	MEX	Joaquín Hernández
—	MF	MEX	Raul Rodrigo Lara
—	MF	ARG	German Martellotto
—	MF	MEX	Guillermo Naranjo
—	MF	MEX	German Villa
—	FW	MEX	Luís Roberto Alves
—	FW	MEX	Hugo Sanchez
—	FW	MEX	Francisco Uribe
—	FW	MEX	Pedro Pineda
—	FW	MEX	Cuauhtemoc Blanco

=== Transfers ===
==== In ====
Note: Flags indicate national team as defined under FIFA eligibility rules; some limited exceptions apply. Players may hold more than one non-FIFA nationality.

No.	Pos.	Nation	Player
—	FW	MEX	Hugo Sanchez from (Spain) Real Madrid
—	MF	BRA	Bernardo from (Germany) Bayern München
—	DF	BRA	Geraldao from (France) Paris Saint-Germain
—	DF	MEX	Arturo Alvarez from Puebla FC
—	FW	MEX	Pedro Pineda from Chivas Guadalajara
—	FW	MEX	Francisco Uribe from Club Leon
—	MF	ARG	German Martellotto from CF Monterrey
—	MF	ARG	Marcelo Barticciotto from (Chile) Colo Colo (January)
—	DF	ARG	Oscar Ruggeri from (Italy) Ancona Calcio (January)

==== Out ====
Note: Flags indicate national team as defined under FIFA eligibility rules; some limited exceptions apply. Players may hold more than one non-FIFA nationality.

No.	Pos.	Nation	Player
—	MF	BRA	Antonio Carlos Santos to (Portugal) FC Porto
—	MF	BRA	Edu Manga to (Brazil) Corinthians
—	DF	MEX	Alfredo Tena to (Mexico) Tecos UAG

== Competitions ==
=== Liga MX ===
==== Group 2 ====
Pos	Team	Pld	W	D	L	GF	GA	GD	Pts	Qualification
1	Necaxa	38	23	8	7	76	43	+33	54	Playoff
2	América	38	18	11	9	51	46	+5	47	Playoff
3	Tecos	38	15	16	7	43	32	+11	46	Playoff
4	Puebla	38	16	11	11	58	56	+2	43	
5	Morelia	38	8	14	16	43	61	−18	30	

==== Matches ====
19 August 1992 1	Correcaminos UAT	0–1	América	Ciudad Victoria
20:30 CT		Report	Hugo Sánchez 77'	Stadium: Estadio Marte R. Gomez

23 August 1992 2	América	1–0	Leones Negros UdeG	Tlalpan
12:00 CT	Hugo Sánchez 55'	Report		Stadium: Azteca

30 August 1992 3	Chivas Guadalajara	1–0	América	Guadalajara
12:00 CT	Armando Gonzalez 76'	Report		Stadium: Jalisco

6 September 1992 4	América	3-4	Puebla FC	Tlalpan
12:00 CT	Martellotto 26'; Alves 87'; Martellotto 89'	Report	Dioney Carlos 1'; Rotllan 67'; Olindo 68'; Dioney Carlos 85'	Stadium: Azteca

13 September 1992 5	Necaxa	1-0	América	Tlalpan
12:00 CT	Aguinaga 55'	Report		Stadium: Azteca

20 September 1992 6	América	1-0	Tiburones Rojos de Veracruz	Tlalpan
12:00 CT	Alves 51'	Report		Stadium: Azteca

24 September 1992 7	Pumas UNAM	2-3	América	Coyoacán
15:00 CT	Suarez 43'; Patiño 70' (pen.)	Report	Alves 22'; Francisco Uribe 34'; Alves 68' (pen.)	Stadium: Olimpico

2 October 1992 8	América	3-3	CD Toluca	Tlalpan
20:45 CT	Martellotto 7'; Martellotto 27'; Martellotto 67'	Report	Alejandro García 3' (o.g.); Jorge Rodriguez 10'; Romero 58'	Stadium: Azteca

10 October 1992 9	Monterrey	3-1	América	Monterrey
17:00 CT	Jimenez 56'; Verdirame 61'; Valdez 83' (pen.)	Report	Hugo Sanchez 27'	Stadium: Tecnologico

19 October 1992 10	America	2-2	Santos Laguna	Tlalpan
20:45 CT	Martellotto 28'; Farfan 54'	Report	Juan Flores 35'; Juan Flores 62'	Stadium: Azteca

24 October 1992 11	Atlas	1-1	América	Guadalajara
20:45 CT	Domizzi 43'	Report	Bernardo 19'	Stadium: Jalisco

1 November 1992 12	America	2-1	Tecos UAG	Tlalpan
16:30 CT	Farfan 6'; Hugo Sanchez 70'	Report	Ruvalcaba 89'	Stadium: Azteca

4 November 1992 13	Atletico Morelia	1-2	America	Morelia
16:00 CT	Morales 86'	Report	Hugo Sanchez 65'; Hugo Sanchez 81'	Stadium: Morelos

8 November 1992 14	America	1-0	Queretaro	Tlalpan
12:00 CT	Astivia 85'	Report		Stadium: Azteca

17 November 1992 15	America	0-2	Atlante FC	Tlalpan
20:45 CT		Report	Guzmán 43'; Salvador 49' (pen.)	Stadium: Azteca

21 November 1992 16	Pachuca FC	5-0	América	Pachuca
15:00 CT	Medina 11' (pen.); Castañeda 18'; Cortes 43'; Cortes 60'; Castillo 89'	Report		Stadium: Hidalgo

29 November 1992 17	America	3-1	Cruz Azul	Tlalpan
13:00 CT	Pineda 18'; Farfán 67'; Farfan 73'	Report	Kooiman 53'	Stadium: Azteca

5 December 1992 18	Leon	1-1	America	Leon
20:45 CT	Tita 64' (pen.)	Report	Hugo Sánchez 66' (pen.)	Stadium: Nou Camp

12 December 1992 19	America	0-1	Tigres UANL	Tlalpan
13:00 CT		Report	Almaguer 29'	Stadium: Azteca

21 December 1992 20	America	1-0	Correcaminos UAT	Tlalpan
20:45 CT	Ruggeri 81'	Report		Stadium: Azteca

2 January 1993 21	Leones Negros UdeG	1-1	America	Guadalajara
20:45 CT	Flores 25'	Report	Hugo Sánchez 75' (pen.)	Stadium: Jalisco

10 January 1993 22	America	2-1	Chivas Guadalajara	Tlalpan
12:00 CT	Farfán 25'; Farfan 75'	Report	Balcázar 68'	Stadium: Azteca

13 January 1993 23	Puebla FC	0-0	America	Puebla de los Angeles
14:30 CT		Report		Stadium: Cuauhtemoc

18 January 1993 24	América	1-0	Necaxa	Tlalpan
20:45 CT	Cecilio de los Santos 32'	Report		Stadium: Azteca

24 January 1993 25	Tiburones Rojos de Veracruz	3-0	America	Puebla de los Angeles
16:00 CT	Gaytán 17'; Gaytan 47'; Morales 50'	Report		Stadium: Estadio Cuauhtemoc

31 January 1993 26	America	2-2	Pumas	Tlalpan
12:00 CT	Hernández 67'; Alves 89'	Report	Jorge Campos 22'; Santillana 35'	Stadium: Azteca

7 February 1993 27	CD Toluca	1-2	America	Toluca
11:00 CT	Depietri 50'	Report	Naranjo 5'; Hugo Sánchez 89'	Stadium: La Bombonera

15 February 1993 28	America	0-0	Monterrey	Tlalpan
20:45 CT		Report		Stadium: Azteca

21 February 1993 29	Santos	1-3	America	Torreón
16:00 CT	Ortega 71'	Report	Bernardo 25'; Martellotto 60'; Martellotto 75'	Stadium: Corona

28 February 1993 30	America	2-0	Atlas	Tlalpan
12:00 CT	Alves 10'; Alves 23'	Report		Stadium: Azteca

5 March 1993 31	Tecos UAG	1-0	América	Zapopan
20:30 CT	Osmar Donizete 67'	Report		Stadium: 3 de Marzo

12 March 1993 32	America	2-1	Atletico Morelia	Tlalpan
20:45 CT	Farfán 55'; García 67' (o.g.)	Report	Ramírez 32'	Stadium: Azteca

21 March 1993 33	Queretaro	1-2	America	Santiago de Queretaro
12:00 CT	Marchi 63'	Report	Rodón 13'; Francisco Uribe 22'	Stadium: Corregidora

28 March 1993 34	Atlante FC	1-1	America	Benito Juarez
12:00 CT	García 6'	Report	Hernández 4'	Stadium: Azulgrana

4 April 1993 35	América	2-0	Pachuca FC	Tlalpan
16:00 CT	Ruggeri 72'; Bernardo 75'	Report		Stadium: Azteca

19 April 1993 36	Cruz Azul	1-1	América	Tlalpan
20:45 CT	Poblete 10'	Report	Pineda 71'	Stadium: Azteca

26 April 1993 37	América	2-1	León	Tlalpan
20:45 CT	Alves 74'; Ruggeri 78'	Report	Ayipei 3'	Stadium: Azteca

1 May 1993 38	Tigres UANL	2-2	América	San Nicolas de los Garza
16:00 CT	Almaguer 33'; Rossi 92'	Report	Bernardo 36'; Alves 81'	Stadium: Universitario

==== Quarterfinals ====
12 May 1993	Cruz Azul	0-3	América	Mexico City
CT			German Martellotto 9'; Bernardo 17'; Hugo Sánchez 60'	Stadium: Estadio Azteca

15 May 1993	América	3-4 (6-4 agg.)	Cruz Azul	Mexico City
CT	Hugo Sánchez 4'; Juan Hernández 39'; Alves 50'		Pedro Duana 31'; Carlos Hermosillo 62' 75'; Carlos Poblete 87'	Stadium: Estadio Azteca

==== Semifinals ====
19 May 1993	CF Monterrey	1-0	América	Monterrey
CT	Carlos Alberto Bianchezi 84'			Stadium: Estadio Tecnologico

22 May 1993	América	0-0 (0-1 agg.)	CF Monterrey	Mexico City
CT				Stadium: Estadio Azteca

=== Concacaf Champions' Cup ===
==== Fourth round ====
(United States) Dallas Rockets	1-2	(Mexico) América	Dallas

América (Mexico)	5-1	(United States) Dallas Rockets	Mexico City
			Stadium: Estadio Azteca

==== Fifth round ====
América (Mexico)	3-1	(United States) S. F. Bay Blackhawks	Mexico City
			Stadium: Estadio Azteca

S. F. Bay Blackhawks (United States)	2-1	(Mexico) América	San Francisco

==== Semifinals ====
4 October 1992	América (Mexico)	7-0	(Suriname) Robinhood	Santiago de Querétaro
	Alex Domínguez 7'; Luís Roberto Alves 29'; Gonzalo Farfán 35'; Germán Martellotto 41', 82'; Hugo Sánchez 46' (pen.); José Enrique Rodón 88'			Stadium: Corregidora

==== Final ====
5 January 1993	América (Mexico)	1-0	(Costa Rica) Liga Deportiva Alajuelense	Santa Ana
	Hugo Sánchez 67'	Report		Stadium: Santa Ana Stadium; Attendance: 35,000; Referee: Majid Bay
