= 1984–85 Atlético Madrid season =

44th season in existence of Atlético Madrid

Atlético Madrid
1984–85 season
- President: Vicente Calderón
- Head coach: Luis Aragonés
- Stadium: Vicente Calderón
- La Liga: 2nd
- Copa del Rey: Winners (in UEFA Cup Winners' Cup)
- Copa de la Liga: Runners-up
- UEFA Cup: 1st round
- Top goalscorer: League: Hugo Sánchez (19); All: Hugo Sánchez (28)
Home colours	Away colours	Third colours

The 1984–85 season was Atlético Madrid's 44th season since foundation in 1903 and the club's 38th season in La Liga, the top league of Spanish football. Atlético competed in La Liga, the Copa del Rey, and the UEFA Cup.

== Season ==
Atlético Madrid won the Copa del Rey for the second consecutive season, defeating Parla, Málaga, Deportivo de La Coruña, Spórting de Gijón, and Real Zaragoza on their path to the final against Athletic Bilbao.

== Squad ==
Note: Flags indicate national team as defined under FIFA eligibility rules; some limited exceptions apply. Players may hold more than one non-FIFA nationality.

No.	Pos.	Nation	Player
—	GK	ESP	Pereira
—	GK	ESP	Mejías
—	GK	ESP	Navarro
—	DF	FRG	Mirko Votava
—	DF	ESP	Arteche
—	DF	ESP	Balbino
—	DF	ESP	Juanjo
—	DF	ESP	Marcelino
—	DF	ESP	Ruiz
—	DF	ESP	Tomás Reñones
—	DF	ESP	Clemente Villaverde

No.	Pos.	Nation	Player
—	MF	ESP	Marina
—	MF	ESP	Mínguez
—	MF	ESP	Quique Ramos
—	MF	ESP	Román
—	MF	ESP	Julio Prieto
—	MF	ESP	Jesus Landaburu
—	FW	MEX	Hugo Sánchez
—	FW	ARG	Cabrera
—	FW	ESP	Enrique Morán
—	FW	ESP	Pedraza

=== Transfers ===
In
Pos.	Name	from	Type
FW	Enrique Morán	FC Barcelona	

Out
Pos.	Name	To	Type
MF	Victor	Real Valladolid	
MF	Pedro Pablo	Recreativo Huelva	
MF	Luis Marián	Celta Vigo	
MF	Manolo Agujetas	Atletico Madrileño	

== Results ==
=== La Liga ===
==== Position by round ====
Round	1	2	3	4	5	6	7	8	9	10	11	12	13	14	15	16	17	18	19	20	21	22	23	24	25	26	27	28	29	30	31	32	33	34
Ground	H	A	H	A	H	A	A	H	A	H	A	H	A	H	A	H	A	A	H	A	H	A	H	H	A	H	A	H	A	H	A	H	A	H
Result	D	W	W	L	W	W	D	L	W	L	D	D	W	D	L	D	W	D	W	W	W	W	W	L	D	D	W	W	D	W	D	W	L	L
Position	11	5	3	4	4	3	3	5	3	4	4	4	4	4	6	6	4	5	3	3	2	2	2	2	2	2	2	2	2	2	2	2	2	2

Source: www.lfp.es
A = Away; H = Home; W = Win; D = Draw; L = Loss; = 1985-86 European Cup; = 1985-86 UEFA Cup; = 1985-86 Segunda Division

==== League table ====
Pos	Team	Pld	W	D	L	GF	GA	GD	Pts	Qualification or relegation
1	Barcelona (C)	34	21	11	2	69	25	+44	53	Qualification for the European Cup first round
2	Atlético Madrid	34	16	11	7	51	28	+23	43	Qualification for the Cup Winners' Cup first round (Note: Atlético Madrid qualified for the European Cup Winners' Cup as winners of the Copa del Rey.)
3	Athletic Bilbao	34	13	15	6	39	26	+13	41	Qualification for the UEFA Cup first round
4	Sporting Gijón	34	13	15	6	34	23	+11	41	Qualification for the UEFA Cup first round
5	Real Madrid	34	13	10	11	46	36	+10	36	Qualification for the UEFA Cup first round

Source: BDFútbol
Rules for classification: 1) Points; 2) Head-to-head results; 3) Goal difference; 4) Number of goals scored
(C) Champions

==== Matches ====
Win Draw Loss

31 August 1984 1	RCD Español	0–0	Atlético Madrid	Barcelona
		Report		Stadium: Sarria; Referee: Joaquin Ramos Marcos

8 September 1984 2	Atlético Madrid	3–0	CA Osasuna	Madrid
	Miguel Angel 67'; Antelo 78'; Antelo 80'	Report		Stadium: Vicente Calderón
Note: The match was played with youth and amateur players due to an ongoing strike caused by professional players.

22 September 1984 4	Atlético Madrid	2-1	Real Sociedad	Madrid
	Hugo Sánchez 31'; Hugo Sánchez 32'	Report	Lopez Ufarte 53'	Stadium: Vicente Calderón

29 September 1984 5	CD Málaga	1–0	Atlético Madrid	Málaga
	Zlatomir Micanovic 60'	Report		Stadium: La Rosaleda

7 October 1984 6	Atlético Madrid	2-1	Real Murcia	Madrid
	Miguel Sanchez 15' (o.g.); Quique Ramos 28'	Report	Figueroa 60'	Stadium: Vicente Calderón

12 October 1984 7	Atlético Madrid	1-0	Hércules CF	Madrid
	Moran 89'	Report		Stadium: Vicente Calderón

20 October 1984 8	Valencia CF	0-0	Atlético Madrid	Valencia
		Report		Stadium: Mestalla

28 October 1984 9	Atlético Madrid	1–2	FC Barcelona	Madrid
	Hugo Sánchez 61' (pen.)	Report	Calderé 8'; Migueli 84'	Stadium: Vicente Calderón

31 October 1984 3(*)	Real Betis	0–1	Atlético Madrid	Sevilla
		Report	Hugo Sánchez 81' (pen.)	Stadium: Benito Villamarin
Note: The match was originally scheduled for 16 September 1984, but was postponed due to a strike caused by professional players.

3 November 1984 10	Sporting Gijón	2-1	Atlético Madrid	Gijón
	Maceda 31'; Joaquin 44'	Report	Marina 56'	Stadium: El Molinon

17 November 1984 11	Atlético Madrid	1–1	Sevilla FC	Madrid
	Cabrera 24'	Report	Montero 85' (pen.)	Stadium: Vicente Calderón

20 November 1984 12	Real Valladolid	2–2	Atlético Madrid	Valladolid
	Moré 44'; Jorge Da Silva 47'	Report	Quique Ramos 18'; Julio Prieto 21'	Stadium: Estadio Jose Zorrilla

24 November 1984 13	Atlético Madrid	2–1	Racing Santander	Madrid
	Landaburu 20'; Cabrera 73'	Report	Quiqué Setién 47'	Stadium: Vicente Calderón

1 December 1984 14	Athletic Bilbao	2–2	Atlético Madrid	Bilbao
	Endika 27'; Noriega 67'	Report	Hugo Sánchez 34' (pen.); Hugo Sánchez 52'	Stadium: Estadio San Mames

7 December 1984 15	Atlético Madrid	0–1	Real Madrid	Madrid
		Report	Valdano 81'	Stadium: Vicente Calderón

15 December 1984 16	Real Zaragoza	1–1	Atlético Madrid	Zaragoza
	Señor 37' (pen.)	Report	25' Cabrera	Stadium: Estadio La Romareda

22 December 1984 17	Atlético Madrid	1-0	Elche CF	Madrid
	Cabrera 61'	Report		Stadium: Vicente Calderón

29 December 1984 18	Atlético Madrid	2–2	RCD Español	Madrid
	Hugo Sánchez 57' (pen.); Pedraza 73'	Report	Zuñiga 28'; Zuñiga 43'	Stadium: Vicente Calderón

12 January 1985 19	Atlético Madrid	2–0	Real Betis	Madrid
	Mirko Votava 4'; Cabrera 38'	Report		Stadium: Vicente Calderón

21 January 1985 20	Real Sociedad	0–4	Atlético Madrid	San Sebastián
		Report	Ruiz 10'; Cabrera 31'; Cabrera 65'; Hugo Sánchez 67'	Stadium: Estadio Anoeta

26 January 1985 21	Atlético Madrid	3–0	CD Málaga	Madrid
	Hugo Sánchez 5'; Ruiz 73'; Hugo Sánchez 83'	Report		Stadium: Vicente Calderón

2 February 1985 22	Real Murcia	0–1	Atlético Madrid	Murcia
		Report	Cabrera 28'

9 February 1985 23	Hércules CF	1–3	Atlético Madrid	Alicante
	Dante Sanabria 40' (pen.)	Report	45' Hugo Sánchez; 79' Cabrera; 86' Hugo Sánchez

19 February 1985 24	Atlético Madrid	2–3	Valencia CF	Madrid
	Marina 81'; Marina 89'	Report	15' Wilmar Cabrera; 31' Wilmar Cabrera; 77' Wilmar Cabrera	Stadium: Vicente Calderón

25 February 1985 25	FC Barcelona	2–2	Atlético Madrid	Barcelona
	Migueli 23'; Steve Archibald 88'	Report	62' Hugo Sánchez; 63' Cabrera	Stadium: Camp Nou; Referee: Joaquin Ramos Marcos

2 March 1985 26	Atlético Madrid	0–0	Sporting Gijón	Madrid
		Report		Stadium: Vicente Calderón; Referee: Felipe Crespo Aurre

9 March 1985 27	Sevilla FC	2–4	Atlético Madrid	Sevilla
	Moises 37'; Francisco 68'	Report	16' Cabrera; 35' Marina; 54' Hugo Sánchez; 79' Hugo Sánchez	Stadium: Sanchez Pizjuan

16 March 1985 28	Atlético Madrid	2–0	Real Valladolid	Madrid
	Hugo Sánchez 21'; Hugo Sánchez 87'	Report		Stadium: Vicente Calderón

19 March 1985 29	CA Osasuna	0–0	Atlético Madrid	Pamplona
		Report		Stadium: El Sadar

23 March 1985 30	Racing Santander	1–2	Atlético Madrid	Santander
	Alan Campbell 80'	Report	15' Hugo Sánchez; 73' Cabrera	Stadium: El Sardinero

30 March 1985 31	Atlético Madrid	0–0	Athletic Bilbao	Madrid
		Report		Stadium: Vicente Calderón

6 April 1985 32	Real Madrid	0–4	Atlético Madrid	Madrid
	Angel (red card); Gallego (yellow card)	Report	Hugo Sánchez 3'; Marina 11'; Cabrera 82'; Cabrera 89'; Tomas (yellow card); Landaburu (yellow card); Marina (yellow card)	Stadium: Santiago Bernabeu; Referee: Felipe Crespo Aurre

13 April 1985 33	Atlético Madrid	0–1	Real Zaragoza	Madrid
		Report	Conde 57'	Stadium: Vicente Calderón

20 April 1985 34	Elche CF	1–0	Atlético Madrid	Elche
	Carlos 81'	Report

=== UEFA Cup ===
==== First round ====
19 September 1984 1	FC Sion (Switzerland)	1–0	(Spain) Atlético Madrid	Sion
	Cina 75'	Report		Stadium: Stade de Tourbillon; Attendance: 7,500; Referee: (West Germany) Aron Schmidhuber

3 October 1984 2	Atlético Madrid (Spain)	2–3 (2–4 agg.)	(Switzerland) FC Sion	Madrid
	Sánchez 15' (pen.); Pedraza 38'	Report	1' (o.g.) Marina; 4', 13' Cina	Stadium: Vicente Calderón; Attendance: 20,000; Referee: (England) Alan Robinson

=== Copa del Rey ===
==== Second round ====
7 November 1984 1st leg	Parla	2–3	Atlético Madrid	Parla
	Domínguez 19', 24'	Report	7' Morán; 17' (o.g.) Rafa; 30' Cabrera	Stadium: Los Prados; Attendance: 4,000; Referee: Ramos Marcos

14 November 1984 2nd leg	Atlético Madrid	5–2 (8–4 agg.)	Parla	Madrid
	Cabrera 16', 41', 51'; Marina 79'; J. Prieto 84'	Report	18' Pinki; 75' (pen.) Domínguez	Stadium: Vicente Calderón; Referee: Ceballos Borrego

==== Third round ====
12 December 1984 1st leg	Málaga	0–3	Atlético Madrid	Málaga
21:00 CET		Report	61' Marina; 75' Sánchez; 80' J. Prieto	Stadium: La Rosaleda; Attendance: 10,000; Referee: Pes Pérez

9 January 1985 2nd leg	Atlético Madrid	1–2 (4–2 agg.)	Málaga	Madrid
	Cabrera 42'	Report	28' Tello; 63' (pen.) Zambrano	Stadium: Vicente Calderón; Attendance: 1,000; Referee: Ceballos Borrego

==== Round of 16 ====
13 March 1985 1st leg	Deportivo de La Coruña	1–1	Atlético Madrid	A Coruña
20:30 CET	Brizzola 28'	Report	16' Cabrera	Stadium: Riazor; Attendance: 16,000; Referee: Valdés Sánchez

3 April 1985 2nd leg	Atlético Madrid	5–2 (6–3 agg.)	Deportivo de La Coruña	Madrid
20:30 CEST	Cabrera 5', 6'; J. Prieto 41'; Sánchez 59' (pen.), 85'	Report	15' J. Luis; 68' Traba	Stadium: Vicente Calderón; Attendance: 10,000; Referee: Damín Rendón

==== Quarterfinals ====
17 April 1985 1st leg	Sporting de Gijón	1–2	Atlético Madrid	Gijón
20:30 CEST	Zurdi 58'	Report	2' Cabrera; 69' Marina	Stadium: El Molinón; Attendance: 25,000; Referee: Merino González

15 May 1985 2nd leg	Atlético Madrid	0–0 (2–1 agg.)	Sporting de Gijón	Madrid
17:30 CEST		Report		Stadium: Vicente Calderón; Attendance: 20,000; Referee: Marín López

==== Semifinals ====
19 June 1985 1st leg	Atlético Madrid	3–0	Real Zaragoza	Madrid
21:00 CEST	Quique 25'; Cabrera 34'; Mínguez 87'	Report		Stadium: Vicente Calderón; Attendance: 20,000; Referee: Miguel Pérez

23 June 1985 2nd leg	Real Zaragoza	3–1 (3–4 agg.)	Atlético Madrid	Zaragoza
20:00 CEST	Conde 7'; Casajús 82'; Ayneto 77'	Report	67' Sánchez	Stadium: La Romareda; Attendance: 5,000; Referee: García de Loza

==== Final ====
30 June 1985 Final	Atlético Madrid	2–1	Athletic Bilbao	Madrid
21:00 CEST	Sánchez 24' (pen.), 55'	Report	75' Salinas	Stadium: Santiago Bernabéu; Attendance: 85,000; Referee: Miguel Pérez

=== Copa de la Liga ===
==== Eighthfinals ====
5 May 1985 1st leg	Atlético Madrid	4–0	Real Murcia	Madrid
	Arteche 17'; Cabrera 63'; Marina 66'; Rubio 76'	Report		Stadium: Vicente Calderón; Attendance: 5,000; Referee: Álvarez Díaz

9 May 1985 2nd leg	Real Murcia	0–5 (0–9 agg.)	Atlético Madrid	Murcia
		Report	10' Arteche; 30' Sánchez; 33' (pen.), 40' Rubio; 59' Ruiz	Stadium: La Condomina; Referee: García De Loza

==== Quarterfinals ====
12 May 1985 1st leg	Atlético Madrid	3–1	Real Betis	Madrid
	Rubio 67'; Cabrera 78', 79'	Report	68' Parra	Stadium: Vicente Calderón; Attendance: 25,000; Referee: Urío Velázquez

19 May 1985 2nd leg	Real Betis	2–1 (3–4 agg.)	Atlético Madrid	Seville
	Rincón 29'; Gordillo 47'	Report	82' Marina	Stadium: Benito Villamarín; Attendance: 39,000; Referee: Crespo Aurre

==== Semifinals ====
30 May 1985 1st leg	Atlético Madrid	5–1	Espanyol	Madrid
	Sánchez 12'; Rubio 19'; Landáburu 41'; Arteche 52'; Marina 87'	Report	22' (pen.) Lauridsen	Stadium: Vicente Calderón; Attendance: 25,000; Referee: Martín Navarrete

2 June 1985 2nd leg	Espanyol	2–0 (3–5 agg.)	Atlético Madrid	Barcelona
	Job 55'; Lauridsen 72' (pen.)	Report		Stadium: Estadi de Sarrià; Attendance: 12,000; Referee: Ramos Marcos

==== Final ====
5 June 1985 1st leg	Atlético Madrid	3–2	Real Madrid	Madrid
	Rubio 10'; Balbino (yellow card) 52' (yellow-red card); Arteche 57'; Cabrera 58'	Report	50' Pineda; 83' Santillana	Stadium: Vicente Calderón; Attendance: 30,000; Referee: Urío Velázquez

15 June 1985 2nd leg	Real Madrid	2–0 (4–3 agg.)	Atlético Madrid	Madrid
	Stielike 25'; Míchel 62'	Report		Stadium: Santiago Bernabéu; Attendance: 65,000; Referee: Crespo Aurre

== Squad statistics ==
=== Appearances and goals ===
No.	Pos	Nat	Player	Total		La Liga		Copa del Rey		UEFA		Copa de la Liga	
No.	Pos	Nat	Player	Apps	Goals	Apps	Goals	Apps	Goals	Apps	Goals	Apps	Goals
-	GK	(Spain) ESP	Mejías	41	-37	30	-26	7	-8	0	0	4	-3
-	DF	(Germany) GER	Votava	52	2	32	1	11	1	2	0	7	0
-	DF	(Spain) ESP	Ruiz	36	3	24+1	2	4+1	0	2	0	1+3	1
-	DF	(Spain) ESP	Arteche	52	4	33	0	9	0	2	0	8	4
-	DF	(Spain) ESP	Tomas	49	0	32	0	7	0	2	0	8	0
-	MF	(Spain) ESP	Julio Prieto	48	4	31	1	10+1	3	0+1	0	4+1	0
-	MF	(Spain) ESP	Landaburu	51	2	33	1	8	0	2	0	8	1
-	MF	(Spain) ESP	Quique Ramos	51	3	32+1	2	9	1	2	0	7	0
-	MF	(Spain) ESP	Marina	51	12	22+11	5	6+3	4	2	0	7	3
-	FW	(Argentina) ARG	Mario Cabrera	42	26	24	14	9	8	0+1	0	8	4
-	FW	(Mexico) MEX	Hugo Sánchez	51	28	33	19	8	6	2	1	8	2
-	GK	(Spain) ESP	Pereira	13	-19	3	-2	4	-6	2	-4	4	-7
-	DF	(Spain) ESP	Balbino	26	0	9+1	0	7+1	0	1	0	7	0
-	DF	(Spain) ESP	Clemente	22	0	8+6	0	5+1	0	0	0	2	0
-	MF	(Spain) ESP	Enrique Morán	16	2	6+5	1	2+2	1	0	0	0+1	0
-	FW	(Spain) ESP	Rubio	30	6	5+10	0	4+1	0	1+1	0	5+3	6
-	FW	(Spain) ESP	Pedraza	18	2	5+8	1	3	0	2	1		
-	FW	(Spain) ESP	Minguez	22	1	1+10	0	4+3	1	0	0	0+4	0
-	DF	(Spain) ESP	Marcelino	2	0	0	0	2	0				
-	DF	(Spain) ESP	Juanjo	2	0	0	0	2	0				

- Source: https://www.bdfutbol.com/en/t/t1984-857.html
