= 1981–82 Atlético Madrid season =

41st season in existence of Atlético Madrid

Atlético Madrid
1981–82 season
- President: Alfonso Cabeza (until 13 January 1982); Antonio del Hoyo Alvarez (until 27 April 1982)
- Head coach: Carriega (until 15 November 1981); García Traid (from 22 November 1981)
- Stadium: Vicente Calderon
- La Liga: 8th
- Copa del Rey: Round of 16
- UEFA Cup: Second round
- Top goalscorer: League: Hugo Sánchez (8); All: Hugo Sánchez (12)
Home colours	Away colours

The 1981–82 season was Atlético de Madrid's 41st season of History since foundation in 1903 and the club's 37th season in La Liga, the top league of Spanish football. Atlético competed in La Liga, the Copa del Rey, and the UEFA Cup.

== Season ==
Atlético de Madrid acquired Mexican striker Hugo Sánchez from Club Universidad Nacional before the season began. After a difficult initial period, Sánchez became the club's leading scorer. At the end of the season, Atlético was obligated to make a second installment of the transfer payment to Pumas as they wanted to retain Sánchez for the following season. In League, the club collapsed during November due to the absence of Sanchez, who was playing for the Mexico national football team the 1981 CONCACAF Championship in Honduras ultimately missing the two available spots for the upcoming 1982 FIFA World Cup.

== Squad ==
Note: Flags indicate national team as defined under FIFA eligibility rules; some limited exceptions apply. Players may hold more than one non-FIFA nationality.

No.	Pos.	Nation	Player
—	GK	ESP	Aguinaga
—	GK	ESP	Mejías
—	GK	ESP	Navarro
—	DF	ESP	Arteche
—	DF	ESP	Balbino
—	DF	ESP	Juanjo
—	DF	ESP	Julio Alberto
—	DF	ESP	Marcelino
—	DF	ESP	Miguel Angel Ruiz
—	DF	ESP	Juan Sierra
—	DF	ESP	Clemente

No.	Pos.	Nation	Player
—	MF	ESP	Marcos Alonso
—	MF	ESP	Marián Díaz
—	MF	ESP	Roberto Marina
—	MF	ESP	Mínguez
—	MF	ESP	Román Miranda
—	MF	ESP	Quique Ramos
—	MF	BRA	Dirceu
—	FW	MEX	Hugo Sánchez
—	FW	ARG	Rubén Cano
—	FW	ARG	Mario Cabrera
—	FW	ESP	Pedro Pablo

=== Transfers ===
In
Pos.	Name	from	Type
FW	Hugo Sánchez	Pumas UNAM	
MF	Luis Marián	Rayo Vallecano	
DF	Juanjo	Recreativo Huelva	

Out
Pos.	Name	To	Type
GK	Eduardo Belza	Atlético Madrid B	
FW	Pedro Braojos	Lorca Deportiva	
DF	Julio	CD Castellón	Loan
MF	Julio Prieto	CD Castellón	loan
FW	Pedraza	Racing de Santander	
FW	Villalba	Linares Deportivo	

==== Winter ====
In
Pos.	Name	from	Type
DF	Clemente	Atlético Madrileño	

Out
Pos.	Name	To	Type
MF	Leal	Granada CF	

== Results ==
=== La Liga ===
==== League table ====
Pos	Team	Pld	W	D	L	GF	GA	GD	Pts	Qualification or relegation
6	Real Betis	34	15	6	13	53	44	+9	36	Qualification for the UEFA Cup first round
7	Sevilla	34	15	5	14	52	39	+13	35	Qualification for the UEFA Cup first round
8	Atlético Madrid	34	15	4	15	38	37	+1	34	
9	Valladolid	34	13	8	13	40	53	−13	34	
10	Osasuna	34	14	6	14	45	45	0	34	

Source: BDFútbol
Rules for classification: 1) Points; 2) Head-to-head results; 3) Goal difference; 4) Number of goals scored

==== Position by round ====
Round	1	2	3	4	5	6	7	8	9	10	11	12	13	14	15	16	17	18	19	20	21	22	23	24	25	26	27	28	29	30	31	32	33	34
Ground	A	H	A	H	A	H	A	H	A	H	H	A	H	A	H	A	H	H	A	H	A	H	A	H	A	H	A	A	H	A	H	A	H	A
Result	W	L	W	L	W	L	W	L	D	L	L	L	W	W	L	W	W	L	L	L	W	W	D	L	L	L	W	W	L	W	D	W	D	W
Position	4	6	7	7	7	7	6	7	8	11	14	17	13	10	12	10	8	9	11	15	13	9	8	10	13	15	13	10	13	12	12	10	10	8

Source: www.lfp.es
A = Away; H = Home; W = Win; D = Draw; L = Loss; = Leader, 1982–83 European Cup; = 1982-83 UEFA Cup; = 1982-83 Segunda División

* UEFA awarded Spanish clubs one extra spot for the upcoming 1982-83 UEFA Cup due to the FC Barcelona triumph in 1981-82 European Cup Winners' Cup. Real Madrid classified to the 1982-83 European Cup Winners' Cup as 1981-82 Copa del Rey winners, therefore, the Spanish Football Federation awarded the teams who finished 4 to 7 on the league table a spot for the 1982-83 UEFA Cup.

==== Matches ====
Win Draw Loss

18 September 1981 1	Atlético Madrid	2–0	Athletic de Bilbao	Madrid
	Ruiz 61'; Marcos Alonso 79'	Report		Stadium: Vicente Calderón Stadium; Referee: Jose Garcia Carrion

25 September 1981 2	Real Madrid	2–1	Atlético Madrid	Madrid
	Santillana 20'; Uli Stielike 68' (yellow card); Sabido (yellow card); García Navajas (yellow card); Juanito (yellow card); Gallego (yellow card)	Report	48' (yellow card) Quique Ramos; (yellow card) Balbino	Stadium: Estadio Santiago Bernabéu; Referee: Enríquez Negreira

4 October 1981 3	Atlético Madrid	1–0	Real Betis	Madrid
	Dirceu 57'; Marcelino (yellow card)	Report	Carlos Peruana (yellow card)	Stadium: Vicente Calderón Stadium; Referee: García de Loza

7 October 1981 4	Cádiz CF	1–0	Atlético Madrid	Cádiz
	Dieguito 20'; Mejías (yellow card)	Report	Julio Alberto (yellow card); Rubio (yellow card)	Stadium: El Molinón; Referee: Victoriano Sanchez Arminio

11 October 1981 5	Atlético Madrid	3–1	UD Las Palmas	Madrid
	Cabrera 30'; Arteche 42'; Quique Ramos 57'	Report	Juani 18'; Toledo (yellow card)	Stadium: Vicente Calderón Stadium; Referee: Bartolomé Jiménez

18 October 1981 6	Sporting de Gijón	3–2	Atlético Madrid	Gijón
	Fernando Gomez 30'; Fernando Gomes 33'; Joaquín 55'	Report	Ruiz 16'; Mínguez 78'	Stadium: Estadio El Molinon; Referee: Ernesto Burgos Nuñez

25 October 1981 7	Atlético Madrid	3–0	CD Castellón	Madrid
	Dirceu 43'; Marcos Alonso 65'; Rubén Cano 75'	Report		Stadium: Vicente Calderón Stadium; Referee: Antonio Martin Navarrete

30 October 1981 8	FC Barcelona	2–0	Atlético Madrid	Barcelona
	Bernd Schuster 20'; Victor Muñoz 37'	Report		Stadium: Camp Nou; Referee: Joaquin Ramos Marcos

7 November 1981 9	Atlético Madrid	0–0	Racing de Santander	Madrid
		Report		Stadium: Vicente Calderón Stadium

10 November 1981 10	Real Sociedad	1–0	Atlético Madrid	San Sebastián
	Satrustegui 4'	Report		Stadium: Estadio Anoeta; Referee: Bartolome Riera Morro

14 November 1981 11	Real Valladolid	2–1	Atlético Madrid	Valladolid
	Gilberto Yearwood 32'; Moré 80'	Report	Marcos Alonso 44'	Stadium: Estadio Jose Zorrilla; Referee: Jose Pes Perez

21 November 1981 12	Atlético Madrid	1–2	Sevilla CF	Madrid
	Arteche 28'	Report	Santi 20'; Cesar 26'	Stadium: Vicente Calderón Stadium; Referee: Felipe Crespo Aurre

28 November 1981 13	Hércules CF	0–1	Atlético Madrid	Alicante
		Report	Hugo Sánchez 84'	Stadium: Vicente Calderón Stadium; Referee: Garcia de Loza

5 December 1981 14	Atlético Madrid	1–0	Real Zaragoza	Madrid
	Hugo Sánchez 42' (pen.); Marián Díaz (yellow card)	Report		Stadium: Vicente Calderón Stadium; Referee: Ildefonso Urizar Azpitarte

11 December 1981 15	Valencia CF	1–0	Atlético Madrid	Valencia
	Frank Arnesen 20'	Report		Stadium: Estadio Mestalla; Referee: Antonio Martin Navarrete

19 December 1981 16	Atlético Madrid	1–0	RCD Español	Madrid
	Arteche 72'	Report		Stadium: Vicente Calderón Stadium; Referee: Bartolome Riera Morro

26 December 1981 17	CA Osasuna	0–1	Atlético Madrid	Pamplona
		Report	48' Hugo Sánchez	Stadium: El Sadar; Referee: Victoriano Sanchez Arminio

2 January 1982 18	Athletic de Bilbao	2–0	Atlético Madrid	Bilbao
	Goikoetxea 20'; Manu Sarabia 60'	Report		Stadium: Estadio San Mames; Referee: Antonio Borras del Barrio

9 January 1981 19	Atlético Madrid	2–3	Real Madrid	Madrid
	Rubio 21'; Marcos Alonso 34'; Aguinaga (yellow card); Julio Alberto (yellow card); Arteche (yellow card) (yellow-red card); Marcos Alonso (red card); Rubio (yellow card)	Report	Gallego 44'; Uli Stielike 82' (pen.); Pineda 85' (yellow card); San Jose (yellow card); Juanito (yellow card)	Stadium: Vicente Calderón Stadium; Referee: Ildefonso Urizar Azpitarte

16 January 1982 20	Real Betis	3–1	Atlético Madrid	Sevilla
	Carlos Diarte 20'; Carlos Diarte 29'; Romo 42'	Report	Rubio 24'	Stadium: Estadio Benito Villamarin; Referee: Bartolome Jimenez

23 January 1982 21	Atlético Madrid	1–0	Cádiz CF	Madrid
	Hugo Sánchez 60'; Arteche (yellow card)	Report	Amarillo (yellow card); Jorge dos Santos (yellow card)	Stadium: Vicente Calderón Stadium; Referee: Felipe Crespo Aurre

29 January 1982 22	UD Las Palmas	1–2	Atlético Madrid	Las Palmas
	Saavedra 89'	Report	Marián Díaz 49'; Hugo Sánchez 55'	Stadium: Balaídos; Referee: Joaquin Urio Velazquez

6 February 1982 23	Atlético Madrid	1–1	Sporting de Gijón	Madrid
	Marián Díaz 42'	Report	Fernando Gomes 17'	Stadium: Vicente Calderón Stadium; Referee: Jose Merino Gonzalez

13 February 1982 24	CD Castellón	3–0	Atlético Madrid	Castellón de la Plana
	Viña 35'; Planelles 67'; Planelles 85'	Report		Stadium: Santiago Bernabéu Stadium; Referee: Jesus Ausocua Sanz

20 February 1982 25	Atlético Madrid	0–1	FC Barcelona	Madrid
	Quique Ramos (yellow card)	Report	Rafael Zuviria 51'; Victor Muñoz (yellow card); Allan Simonsen (yellow card)	Stadium: Vicente Calderón Stadium; Referee: Juan Andújar Oliver

27 February 1982 26	Racing de Santander	1–0	Atlético Madrid	Santander
	Juan Verón 21'	Report		Stadium: Estadio El Sardinero

6 March 1982 27	Atlético Madrid	2–0	Real Sociedad	Madrid
	Arteche 69'; Dirceu 71'	Report		Stadium: Vicente Calderón Stadium; Referee: Garcia de Loza

13 March 1982 28	Atlético Madrid	2–0	Real Valladolid	Madrid
	Balbino 10'; Quique Ramos 75'	Report		Stadium: Vicente Calderón Stadium

20 March 1982 29	Sevilla FC	1–0	Atlético Madrid	Sevilla
	Jorge López 44'	Report		Stadium: Estadio Sanchez Pizjuan

27 March 1982 30	Atlético Madrid	1–0	Hércules CF	Madrid
	Cabrera 5'	Report		Stadium: Vicente Calderón Stadium

3 April 1982 31	Real Zaragoza	2–2	Atlético Madrid	Zaragoza
	Raul Amarilla 3'; Pichi Alonso 34'	Report	Marcos Alonso 20'; Quique Ramos 80'	Stadium: Estadio La Romareda

10 April 1982 32	Atlético Madrid	2–1	Valencia CF	Madrid
	Dirceu 59'; Hugo Sánchez 82'; Arteche (yellow card)	Report	Galvez 60'	Stadium: Vicente Calderón Stadium; Referee: Antonio Martin Navarrete

17 April 1982 33	RCD Español	2–2	Atlético Madrid	Barcelona
	Orlando Jimenez 11'; Murua 80'	Report	Pedro Pablo 29'; Hugo Sánchez 39'	Stadium: Estadio El Sarriá; Referee: Bartolome Jimenez

24 April 1982 34	Atlético Madrid	2–1	CA Osasuna	Madrid
	Ruiz 51'; Hugo Sánchez 79' (pen.); Julio Alberto (red card)	Report	Bayona 88'; Mina (yellow card)	Stadium: Vicente Calderón Stadium; Referee: Joaquin Ramos Marcos

=== Copa del Rey ===
==== Third round ====
24 November 1981	FC Barcelona C	1–1	Atlético Madrid	Barcelona
20:00				Stadium: Camp Nou

7 December 1981	Atlético Madrid	3–2 (4–3 agg.)	FC Barcelona C	Madrid
20:30				Stadium: Vicente Calderón Stadium

==== Fourth round ====
5 January 1982	CD Alaves	1–2	Atlético Madrid	Vitoria, Spain
20:00

12 January 1982	Atlético Madrid	2–1 (4–2 agg.)	CD Alaves	Madrid
20:30				Stadium: Vicente Calderón Stadium

==== Eightfinals ====
19 January 1982	Atlético Madrid	1–0	FC Barcelona	Madrid
20:00				Stadium: Estadio Vicente Calderón

26 January 1982	FC Barcelona	0–0 (0–1 agg.)	Atlético Madrid	Barcelona
20:30				Stadium: Camp Nou

==== Quarterfinals ====
2 February 1982	Real Madrid	0–0	Atlético Madrid	Madrid
20:00				Stadium: Santiago Bernabéu Stadium

16 February 1982	Atlético Madrid	0–1 (0–1 agg.)	Real Madrid	Madrid
20:30				Stadium: Vicente Calderón Stadium

=== UEFA Cup ===
==== First round ====
15 September 1981	Boavista (Portugal)	4–1	(Spain) Atlético Madrid	Boavista
	Francisco Vital 6'; Jorge Silva 17'; Diamantino 74'; Palhares 87'	Report	Pedro Pablo 62'	Attendance: 15,596

1 October 1981	Atlético Madrid (Spain)	3–1 (4–5 agg.)	(Portugal) Boavista	Madrid
	Dirceu 9'; Dirceu 61'; Rubén Cano 88' (pen.)	Report	Diamantino 44'	Stadium: Vicente Calderón Stadium

== Squad statistics ==
=== Appearances and goals ===
No.	Pos	Nat	Player	Total		Primera Division		UEFA Cup		Copa del Rey	
No.	Pos	Nat	Player	Apps	Goals	Apps	Goals	Apps	Goals	Apps	Goals
	GK	(Spain) ESP	Aguinaga	20	-22	18+1	-21	1	-1	0	0
	DF	(Spain) ESP	Balbino	35	1	27	1	1	0	7	0
	DF	(Spain) ESP	Ruiz	43	5	33	3	1	0	9	2
	DF	(Spain) ESP	Arteche	43	8	32	4	1	2	10	2
	DF	(Spain) ESP	Juanjo	36	7	25	5	2	1	9	1
	DF	(Spain) ESP	Julio Alberto	40	2	30	1	2	1	8	0
	MF	(Spain) ESP	Marcos Alonso	33	5	29	5	0	0	4	0
	MF	(Spain) ESP	Quique Ramos	43	4	34	4	1	0	6+2	0
	MF	(Spain) ESP	Mínguez	33	1	14+9	1	2	0	6+2	0
	MF	(Brazil) BRA	Dirceu	40	6	32	4	2	2	6	0
	FW	(Mexico) MEX	Hugo Sánchez	27	12	19+1	8	1+1	0	4+1	4
	GK	(Spain) ESP	Mejías	18	-13	9	-7	0	0	9	-6
	FW	(Spain) ESP	Rubio	29	4	13+7	2	0+1	0	8	2
	DF	(Spain) ESP	Marcelino	16	0	10+2	0	1	0	3	0
	FW	(Argentina) ARG	Mario Cabrera	23	4	9+8	2	0	0	4+2	2
	DF	(Spain) ESP	Clemente	10	0	9+1	0				
	MF	(Spain) ESP	Marián Díaz	24	2	8+10	2	0	0	4+2	0
	FW	(Argentina) ARG	Rubén Cano	16	2	8+4	1	2	1	1+1	0
	GK	(Spain) ESP	Navarro	9	-14	7	-9	1	-4	1	-1
	DF	(Spain) ESP	Sierra	11	0	4+2	0	1	0	3+1	0
	MF	(Spain) ESP	Pedro Pablo	15	3	3+5	1	1+1	1	3+2	1
	MF	(Spain) ESP	Roman	9	0	0+5	0	0	0	1+3	0
	MF	(Spain) ESP	Leal	9	4	1+4	4	0	0	4	0

- Source: https://www.bdfutbol.com/en/t/t1981-827.html
