= Hugo Sánchez (footballer, born 1984) =

Mexican footballer and sports commentator (1984-2014)

- Sánchez in the arms of his father in the 1986 FIFA World Cup

Personal information
- Full name: Hugo Sánchez Portugal
- Date of birth: 15 June 1984
- Place of birth: Madrid, Spain
- Date of death: 8 November 2014 (aged 30)
- Place of death: Mexico City, Mexico
- Height: 1.82 m (5 ft 11 1/2 in)
- Position: Defender

Senior career*
Years	Team	Apps	(Gls)
2004–2005	UNAM	4	(0)
2006	Atlante	0	(0)
2007	Once Municipal	0	(0)
- * Club domestic league appearances and goals

Hugo Sánchez Portugal (15 June 1984 – 8 November 2014) was a Spanish-born Mexican footballer and sports commentator with Televisa Deportes. He was the son of former player and manager of the Mexico national football team, Hugo Sánchez.

== Club career ==
Sánchez Portugal was born in Spain when his father was with Atlético Madrid. Sánchez Portugal played as a striker for Pumas UNAM, when his father was the manager, Sánchez Portugal. His debut for Pumas was on 15 May 2004 against Monterrey. During his short stay with Atlante, he did not appear in any club matches.

== Personal life and death ==
Sánchez Portugal was the son of former Mexico footballer Hugo Sánchez and his first wife Emma Portugal.

After a short-lived playing career, Sánchez was Director of Physical Culture and Sports at the Miguel Hidalgo facility.

On 8 November 2014, he was found dead in his Polanco apartment. The cause of death was later confirmed to be carbon monoxide poisoning, due to obstructed ventilation from a gas-fired water boiler.

== Honours ==
- Primera División de Mexico (2): Clausura 2004, Apertura 2004
