= Felines (footballer) =

Spanish footballer and manager

Personal information
- Full name: Félix Barderas Sierra
- Date of birth: 6 October 1943 (age 83)
- Place of birth: Pedro Bernardo, Spain
- Height: 1.65 m (5 ft 5 in)
- Position: Winger

Senior career*
Years	Team	Apps	(Gls)
1965–1978	Rayo Vallecano	366	(37)

Managerial career
- 1979–1981: Rayo B
- 1980: Rayo Vallecano (interim)
- 1981–1982: Getafe Deportivo
- 1983–1986: Ávila
- 1987–1990: Rayo Vallecano
- 1990–1992: Racing Santander
- 1992–1993: Talavera
- 1993: Rayo Vallecano
- 1994–1996: Talavera
- 1996–1997: Marbella
- 1998–1999: Fuenlabrada
- 1999–2000: Guadalajara
- 2000–2001: Linense
- 2001–2003: Getafe
- 2003–2004: Badajoz
- 2010–2011: Talavera
- * Club domestic league appearances and goals

Félix Barderas Sierra (born 6 October 1943), commonly known as Felines, is a Spanish retired footballer who played as a left winger, and a current manager.

His career is mainly associated to Rayo Vallecano, where he amassed 366 league matches and 37 goals over the course of 13 campaigns.

== Playing career ==
Born in Pedro Bernardo, Ávila, Castile and León, Felines joined Rayo Vallecano in 1965 after only playing amateur football in Madrid, and made his professional debut on 5 September, playing the full 90 minutes in a 3–0 home win against CD Badajoz in the Segunda División championship. His first goal in the category came on 28 November, the first in a home success against CF Calvo Sotelo, with the same outcome.

Felines appeared regularly with Rayo in the following campaigns, netting a career-best seven goals in 1972–73 and achieving promotion to La Liga in 1976–77 after featuring in all league matches. He made his debut in the main category of Spanish football on 13 November 1977, coming on as a late substitute in a 3–1 home win against Sporting de Gijón.

Felines retired in June 1978, at the age of 34.

== Managerial career ==
Shortly after his retirement Felines was appointed Rayo Vallecano B manager in 1979, also being an interim manager of the main squad in a 0–7 away loss against Real Madrid on 3 February 1980. After spells at Getafe Deportivo and Real Ávila CF, he returned to Rayo in 1987, now as a permanent manager of the first team.

Felines led the club to an impressive second place in the 1988–89 campaign, but was sacked in January 1990 after a poor season in the main category overall. Shortly after he was named Racing de Santander manager, achieving another promotion in 1991.

After two years at Talavera CF Felines re-joined Rayo for a third spell, but his reign only lasted two months. He subsequently returned to Talavera, narrowly missing out the play-offs in two consecutive seasons.

Felines subsequently resumed his career in Segunda División B and Tercera División, managing UD Marbella, CF Fuenlabrada, CD Guadalajara, Real Balompédica Linense and Getafe CF. With the latter he achieved promotion to the second level in 2002, but was relieved from his duties on 19 January 2003.

In August 2003 Felines was appointed at the helm of Badajoz, but was sacked in February of the following year. He only returned to the bench six years later, with his former club Talavera.
