= 1986–87 La Liga =

56th season of La Liga

La Liga
- Dates: 30 August 1986 – 21 June 1987
- Champions: Real Madrid; 22nd title
- Relegated: Racing Santander
- European Cup: Real Madrid
- Cup Winners' Cup: Real Sociedad
- UEFA Cup: Barcelona; Español; Sporting Gijón
- Matches: 396
- Goals: 951 (2.4 per match)
- Top goalscorer: Hugo Sánchez (34 goals)

The 1986–87 La Liga season was the 56th since its establishment. It began on 30 August 1986, and concluded on 21 June 1987.

Real Madrid retained the title, but this time finished just a single point ahead of Barcelona, compared to the 11-point margin a year earlier. It was the last of three seasons as Barcelona manager for Englishman Terry Venables before his dismissal, the arrival of British strikers Gary Lineker and Mark Hughes not being enough to save his job or bring the title to Camp Nou.

== Teams and locations ==
It was composed of the following clubs:

Location of teams in La Liga 1986–87
Canary Islands

Team	Home city	Stadium
Athletic Bilbao	Bilbao	San Mamés
Atlético Madrid	Madrid	Vicente Calderón
Barcelona	Barcelona	Nou Camp
Cádiz	Cádiz	Ramón de Carranza
Español	Barcelona	Sarrià
Las Palmas	Las Palmas	Insular
Mallorca	Palma	Lluís Sitjar
Murcia	Murcia	La Condomina
Osasuna	Pamplona	El Sadar
Racing Santander	Santander	El Sardinero
Real Betis	Seville	Benito Villamarín
Real Madrid	Madrid	Santiago Bernabéu
Real Sociedad	San Sebastián	Atocha
Sabadell	Sabadell	Nova Creu Alta
Sevilla	Seville	Ramón Sánchez Pizjuán
Sporting Gijón	Gijón	El Molinón
Valladolid	Valladolid	José Zorrilla
Zaragoza	Zaragoza	La Romareda

== Competition format ==
It was the longest season ever in Spanish football. The league had two phases. In the first one, all 18 teams played each other twice (home and away). At the end of the first phase, the first six teams qualified for the championship group (Group A), the next six qualified for the intermediate group (Group B) and the last six qualified for the relegation group (Group C). In the second phase, teams played only against teams of the same group twice (home and away) and carried their first phase record. The last three in relegation group should have been relegated at the end of the season, but in the middle of the season it was decided that the Primera División and Segunda División would be expanded to 20 teams. In the end, the last three teams of the relegation group played a playoff and only Racing de Santander was relegated.

== Regular season ==
=== League table ===
Pos	Team	Pld	W	D	L	GF	GA	GD	Pts	Qualification
1	Real Madrid	34	20	10	4	61	29	+32	50	Qualification for the championship group
2	Barcelona	34	18	13	3	51	22	+29	49	Qualification for the championship group
3	Español	34	17	9	8	52	30	+22	43	Qualification for the championship group
4	Sporting Gijón	34	14	9	11	47	36	+11	37	Qualification for the championship group
5	Mallorca	34	14	8	12	42	46	−4	36	Qualification for the championship group
6	Zaragoza	34	13	10	11	31	30	+1	36	Qualification for the championship group
7	Atlético Madrid	34	13	9	12	37	40	−3	35	Qualification for the intermediate group
8	Real Betis	34	13	8	13	36	43	−7	34	Qualification for the intermediate group
9	Sevilla	34	13	8	13	41	35	+6	34	Qualification for the intermediate group
10	Real Sociedad	34	13	8	13	45	35	+10	34	Qualification for the intermediate group
11	Murcia	34	13	6	15	31	43	−12	32	Qualification for the intermediate group
12	Valladolid	34	11	9	14	31	32	−1	31	Qualification for the intermediate group
13	Athletic Bilbao	34	11	9	14	39	40	−1	31	Qualification for the relegation group
14	Las Palmas	34	11	7	16	41	48	−7	29	Qualification for the relegation group
15	Osasuna	34	8	11	15	24	40	−16	27	Qualification for the relegation group
16	Racing Santander	34	9	8	17	31	49	−18	26	Qualification for the relegation group
17	Sabadell	34	7	11	16	28	50	−22	25	Qualification for the relegation group
18	Cádiz	34	8	7	19	22	42	−20	23	Qualification for the relegation group

Source: BDFútbol
Rules for classification: 1) Points; 2) Head-to-head results; 3) Goal difference; 4) Number of goals scored

=== Results ===
Home \ Away	ATH	ATM	BAR	BET	CÁD	ESP	LPA	MLL	MUR	OSA	RAC	RMA	RSO	SAB	SEV	SPG	VLD	ZAR
Athletic Bilbao		3–0	2–2	0–0	0–0	2–1	3–0	2–1	2–0	4–1	1–2	1–2	1–1	4–2	0–1	0–0	1–0	1–0
Atlético Madrid	2–0		0–4	1–1	2–0	1–1	1–1	3–1	2–0	1–0	0–1	1–1	1–0	1–1	0–2	1–0	1–0	2–1
FC Barcelona	4–1	1–1		2–0	2–0	1–0	4–0	3–1	2–0	4–2	2–0	3–2	1–0	3–1	1–0	0–4	3–0	0–0
Betis	0–0	2–1	0–1		4–1	2–0	3–1	1–0	3–1	0–0	2–0	2–6	1–0	1–0	0–0	1–0	2–1	0–1
Cádiz CF	1–0	0–1	0–1	1–1		0–2	1–2	1–0	0–1	0–0	3–0	0–0	1–0	3–1	2–0	2–0	1–1	0–1
RCD Español	2–1	2–1	1–1	3–1	1–0		3–1	3–1	2–0	1–0	2–0	0–0	2–2	3–1	5–1	0–0	1–0	2–0
UD Las Palmas	2–1	2–1	0–0	0–0	5–0	3–2		3–0	1–1	2–0	3–2	0–1	0–1	0–0	2–1	3–4	2–0	1–1
RCD Mallorca	1–1	4–3	1–1	3–1	0–1	1–1	4–0		1–0	0–0	3–1	1–0	1–0	1–0	1–1	1–0	3–2	2–0
Murcia	2–0	2–1	1–0	3–0	1–0	1–4	1–0	2–0		0–0	2–1	1–3	1–2	2–0	2–1	2–0	1–0	1–2
Osasuna	0–1	0–2	0–2	2–1	3–0	1–0	2–1	0–0	0–0		2–0	1–0	1–3	1–1	1–1	0–2	1–0	1–0
Racing de Santander	2–1	1–1	0–0	2–0	2–1	1–3	1–0	1–2	1–1	1–1		0–0	1–0	3–0	2–0	1–2	0–0	1–2
Real Madrid	2–4	4–1	1–1	3–0	2–1	1–0	1–1	3–0	1–0	2–1	3–0		1–0	4–0	2–1	2–2	2–1	3–1
Real Sociedad	2–1	0–1	1–1	1–0	4–0	3–3	2–1	7–1	1–1	2–0	1–1	0–2		4–1	0–2	2–1	1–2	1–0
CE Sabadell FC	0–0	0–2	1–1	1–1	1–0	1–1	1–0	1–3	1–0	3–1	1–1	0–1	2–2		2–2	0–0	1–0	1–0
Sevilla FC	3–1	3–0	0–0	1–2	0–0	1–0	1–0	2–1	4–0	1–1	2–0	0–1	1–1	0–1		3–0	2–1	3–0
Sporting de Gijón	2–0	1–1	0–0	3–0	2–1	0–1	1–2	2–2	4–1	3–0	2–1	2–2	0–1	2–1	3–1		3–1	1–0
Valladolid	2–0	0–0	0–0	2–1	1–1	1–0	2–1	0–1	4–0	1–1	2–0	1–1	1–0	1–0	1–0	2–0		1–1
Zaragoza	0–0	1–0	2–0	2–3	1–0	0–0	2–1	0–0	0–0	1–0	4–1	2–2	1–0	2–1	2–0	1–1	0–0	

Legend: Blue = home team win; Yellow = draw; Red = away team win.

== Championship group ==
=== League table ===
Pos	Team	Pld	W	D	L	GF	GA	GD	Pts	Qualification or relegation
1	Real Madrid	44	27	12	5	84	37	+47	66	Qualification for the European Cup first round
2	Barcelona	44	24	15	5	63	29	+34	63	Qualification for the UEFA Cup first round
3	Español	44	20	11	13	66	46	+20	51	Qualification for the UEFA Cup first round
4	Sporting Gijón	44	16	13	15	58	50	+8	45	Qualification for the UEFA Cup first round
5	Zaragoza	44	15	14	15	46	47	−1	44	
6	Mallorca	44	15	12	17	48	65	−17	42	

Source: BDFútbol
Rules for classification: 1) Points; 2) Head-to-head results; 3) Goal difference; 4) Number of goals scored

=== Results ===
Home \ Away	BAR	ESP	MLL	RMA	SPG	ZAR
FC Barcelona		2–1	1–0	2–1	2–0	3–2
RCD Español	0–0		5–0	2–3	2–1	2–1
RCD Mallorca	0–1	1–0		0–4	1–1	2–2
Real Madrid	0–0	2–2	3–0		4–0	2–1
Sporting de Gijón	1–0	4–0	1–1	0–1		1–1
Zaragoza	2–1	2–0	1–1	1–3	2–2	

Legend: Blue = home team win; Yellow = draw; Red = away team win.

== Intermediate group ==
=== League table ===
Pos	Team	Pld	W	D	L	GF	GA	GD	Pts	Qualification
1	Atlético Madrid	44	18	11	15	58	54	+4	47	
2	Real Sociedad	44	19	9	16	59	54	+5	47	Qualification for the Cup Winners' Cup first round (Note: Real Sociedad qualified for the European Cup Winners' Cup as champions of the Copa del Rey.)
3	Real Betis	44	18	9	17	61	59	+2	45	
4	Valladolid	44	15	11	18	42	45	−3	41	
5	Murcia	44	17	7	20	50	63	−13	41	
6	Sevilla	44	14	11	19	51	53	−2	39	

Source: BDFútbol
Rules for classification: 1) Points; 2) Head-to-head results; 3) Goal difference; 4) Number of goals scored

=== Results ===
Home \ Away	ATM	BET	MUR	RSO	SEV	VLD
Atlético Madrid		3–2	4–2	5–1	2–0	0–1
Betis	2–1		5–0	5–1	1–2	3–2
Murcia	1–2	3–2		4–0	2–0	4–1
Real Sociedad	2–1	2–1	2–1		2–1	2–0
Sevilla FC	2–2	1–3	2–2	1–1		1–2
Valladolid	1–1	1–1	2–0	0–1	1–0	

Legend: Blue = home team win; Yellow = draw; Red = away team win.

== Relegation group ==
=== League table ===
Pos	Team	Pld	W	D	L	GF	GA	GD	Pts	Qualification
1	Athletic Bilbao	44	15	12	17	51	50	+1	42	
2	Las Palmas	44	16	9	19	59	67	−8	41	
3	Sabadell	44	12	14	18	38	59	−21	38	
4	Osasuna	44	12	14	18	40	48	−8	38	Qualification for the relegation playoffs
5	Racing Santander	44	12	9	23	46	66	−20	33	Qualification for the relegation playoffs
6	Cádiz	44	10	9	25	31	59	−28	29	Qualification for the relegation playoffs

Source: BDFútbol
Rules for classification: 1) Points; 2) Head-to-head results; 3) Goal difference; 4) Number of goals scored

=== Results ===
Home \ Away	ATH	CÁD	LPA	OSA	RAC	SAB
Athletic Bilbao		1–0	4–1	0–2	3–1	1–1
Cádiz CF	1–1		2–4	1–0	2–1	0–0
UD Las Palmas	1–2	2–1		1–1	3–2	1–1
Osasuna	0–0	3–2	4–0		4–0	0–1
Racing de Santander	2–0	3–0	1–3	1–1		4–0
CE Sabadell FC	1–0	2–0	1–2	2–1	1–0	

Legend: Blue = home team win; Yellow = draw; Red = away team win.

== Relegation playoffs ==
=== League table ===
Pos	Team	Pld	W	D	L	GF	GA	GD	Pts	Relegation
1	Osasuna	2	1	1	0	3	1	+2	3	
2	Cádiz	2	0	2	0	2	2	0	2	
3	Racing Santander (R)	2	0	1	1	1	3	−2	1	Relegated to the Segunda División

Source: BDFútbol
Rules for classification: 1) Points; 2) Head-to-head results; 3) Goal difference; 4) Number of goals scored
(R) Relegated

=== Results ===
Racing de Santander	1-1	Cádiz CF	Penalties:4-3
Cádiz CF	1-1	Osasuna	Penalties:4-3
Osasuna	2-0	Racing de Santander

== Pichichi Trophy ==
Rank	Player	Club	Goals
1	(Mexico) Hugo Sánchez	Real Madrid	34
2	(England) Gary Lineker	Barcelona	20
3	(Spain) Enrique Magdaleno	Mallorca	19
4	(Argentina) Gabriel Calderón	Real Betis	18
5	(Spain) Pichi Alonso	Español	17

La Liga 1986–87 winners

22nd title
