= Francisco Javier Sánchez =

Mexican footballer and manager (born 1973)

Personal information
- Full name: Francisco Javier Sánchez González
- Date of birth: 30 January 1973 (age 53)
- Place of birth: Miguel Hidalgo, Mexico City, Mexico
- Position: Defender

Senior career*
Years	Team	Apps	(Gls)
1989–1991	Cobras de Ciudad Juárez	17	(0)
1991–1992	América	3	(0)
1992–1995	Inter de Tijuana	103	(7)
1995–1997	América	11	(0)
1997–2000	UANL	42	(2)
2000–2001	Cobras de Ciudad Juárez	8	(0)

International career
1996	Mexico U23		

Managerial career
- 2011: América Reserves and Academy
- 2012: Toluca Reserves and Academy
- 2015: San José del Arenal
- 2017–2018: Halcones de Morelos
- * Club domestic league appearances and goals

Francisco Javier Sánchez González (Note: In this Spanish name, the first or paternal surname is Sánchez and the second or maternal family name is González.) (born 30 January 1973) is a Mexican football manager and former player.
