= La Quinta del Buitre =

Moniker given to a group of five Real Madrid players

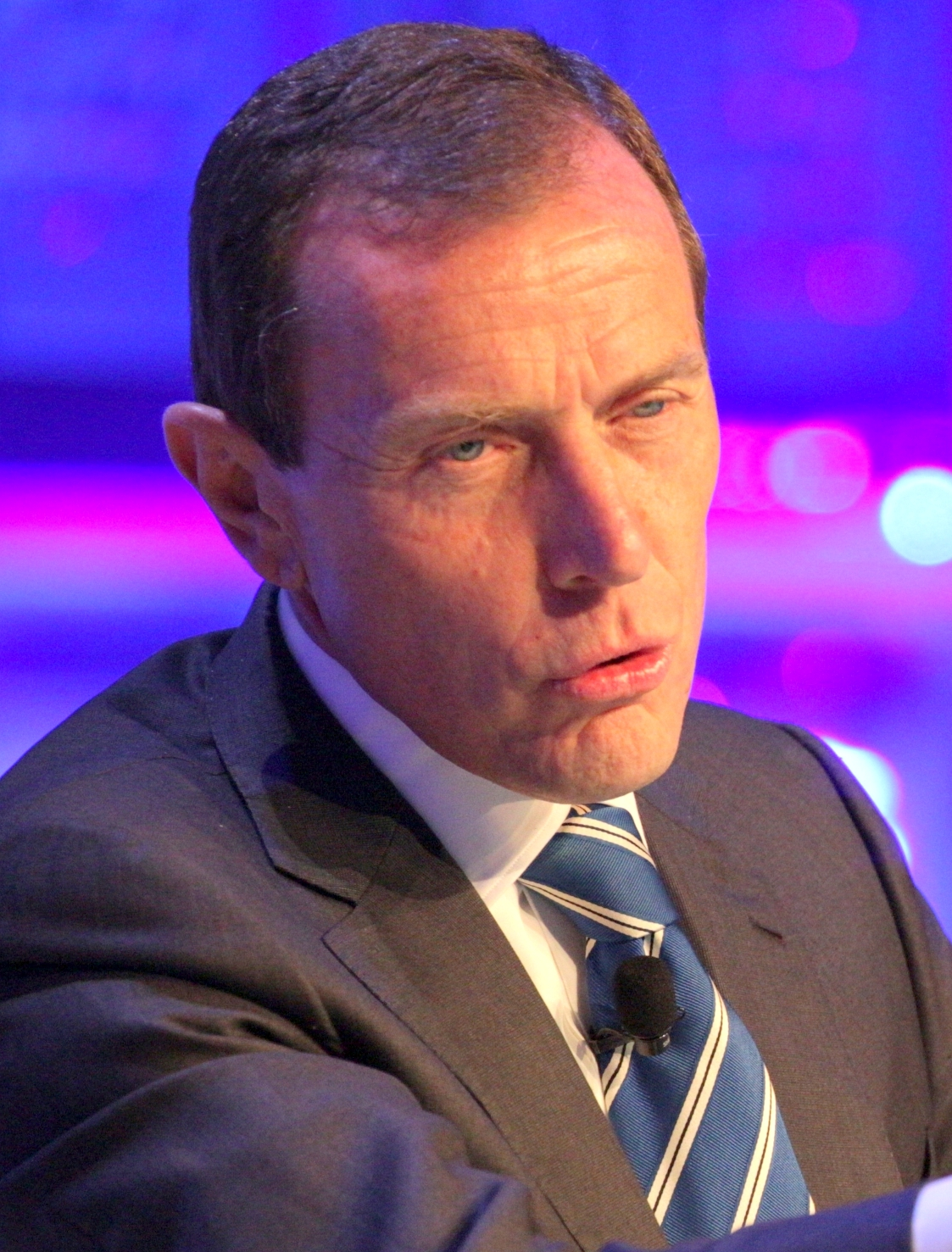
Emilio Butragueño, El Buitre

La Quinta del Buitre is the moniker given by Spanish sport journalist Julio César Iglesias to the five homegrown Real Madrid players who were at the core of the team that dominated Spanish football in the 1980s. The name ("Vulture's Cohort") was derived from Emilio Butragueño's nickname El Buitre, the most charismatic and prominent player of the group. The other four members were Manolo Sanchís, Rafael Martín Vázquez, Míchel and Miguel Pardeza. All five players were graduates of Real Madrid's youth academy, La Fábrica.

== Origin ==
The name originated from an El País article written by journalist Julio César Iglesias entitled "Amancio y la quinta del Buitre". Originally, the article's title was intended to be simply "La Quinta del Buitre", however Iglesias remembers that he decided to add Amancio's name after being advised by the paper's editors that writing a 90-line article about a group of kids, "mocosos", would be excessive. However, that group of young players brought new stamina to the team and they were representatives of the new dynamic that the entire Spanish society was experiencing in those late 1970s and early 1980s.

By the time the article was published, all five players were part of Real Madrid's reserves team, Castilla, and the article had a major impact in order to attract the attention towards these young players. At the end of the season, Castilla finished as champions of the 1983–84 Segunda División, but by then only Míchel was still not incorporated into Real Madrid first team, with the other four having been transferred immediately after the article was published. Sanchís and Martín Vázquez were the first to play for Real Madrid's first team, making their debut away at Murcia on 4 December 1983. Coach Alfredo Di Stéfano brought the youngsters in from the start. Both played surprisingly well and Sanchís even scored the winning goal. A few months later, on 5 February 1984, Emilio Butragueño made his debut in an away game at Cádiz. El Buitre was an instant sensation and scored twice. Pardeza was added to the first team that same season and Míchel followed at the start of the next.

== Achievements ==
With La Quinta del Buitre at its core (reduced to four members when Pardeza left the club for Zaragoza in 1986) Real Madrid had one of the best teams in Spain and Europe during the second half of the 1980s, winning amongst others two UEFA Cups and five Spanish championships in a row. Their record was only blemished by their failure to win the European Cup.^{a}

All the five players were part of Spain's squad during 1990 FIFA World Cup. In the last minutes of the game against Belgium, la "Quinta" was reunited on the pitch after the entry of Miguel Pardeza for Julio Salinas. It was the only time during World Cup Finals.

Martín Vázquez went to play for Torino in 1990. He made a return to Real Madrid in 1992, leaving the club again for good in 1995 (to Deportivo de La Coruña). Butragueño left the club in 1995 and Míchel in 1996. Both went to play for Club Celaya in Mexico.

Sanchís was the only member of La Quinta to never play for a club other than Real Madrid. By winning the Champions League twice (in 1998 and 2000), he also managed to accomplish what La Quinta had failed to achieve in its glory days. He retired in 2001 as the last active member of the famous cohort. In 1998, Sanchís was even awarded the Champions League trophy first, because he was by then the captain of Real Madrid and had played the whole final against Juventus.

With the years, "Quinta Del Buitre" has earned a more generic meaning, being also associated with a brand of football played by Real Madrid in the late 1980s and early 1990s, under the stewardship of coaches Luis Molowny, Leo Beenhakker and John Toshack. During those years, the Madrid club became synonymous with a high-tempo and very skilled, aggressive, style of play. The heated atmosphere then prevailing at the Santiago Bernabéu Stadium sometimes pushed the players to go beyond the limits of acceptable behaviour. Real Madrid was during this period a reckless attacking machine, playing without a holding midfielder very often.

== Comparisons to Galácticos ==
La Quinta del Buitre has been contrasted with the Galácticos era of the early-to-mid 2000s. This latter period saw Real Madrid adopt a fluid and attacking approach to its football under coach Vicente del Bosque. Unlike the Quinta del Buitre years, which favoured homegrown talent, Del Bosque's side was based mainly on expensive foreign imports such as Luís Figo, Zinedine Zidane and Ronaldo. In the meantime, the profile of the supporters attending games at the Santiago Bernabéu had also changed, an embourgeoisement process meant that the support was no longer as vocal and passionate as in the 1980s. A notorious banner deployed in the stands during that period read "Less dollars, more cojones", indicating some kind of nostalgia for the fighting spirit and aggressiveness displayed by the Quinta del Buitre.

The Galácticos were less dominant domestically than their predecessors, winning only two Ligas titles, in 2000–01 and 2002–03. Nevertheless, unlike the Quinta del Buitre, Real Madrid won three Champions League trophies between 1997 and 2002. Two of these continental titles were won prior to the marquee arrival of Figo, and are therefore not a part of the per se Galácticos period, despite many global fans ignoring this fact.

In a country where football has the dimension of a national passion, the Quinta del Buitre was the engine behind the transformation of Spanish football into a more technically developed attacking style of play and, along with Cruyff's Dream Team, the two dominated a decade of Spanish football.

== Recognition and reception ==
The Governing Council of Community of Madrid City awarded the group of footballers with 2021 International Sports Award for their contribution in Spanish and European Football in 2022.

Manchester City president Ferran Soriano, commenting on the supposed "luck" surrounding Real Madrid's 2022 Champions League victory, said: "People don't remember that in the 80s and 90s [Real] had a fantastic team, one of the best in history, with [Emilio] Butragueno and La Quinta, and they could not win [the European Cup]. Milan eliminated them every year. So they were somewhat lucky now, but they were also very unlucky for years."

== Notes ==
1.^aTranslated from Spanish: All agreed to point out the elimination of Eindhoven as the worst moment ever.
