= 1982–83 Athletic Bilbao season =

Athletic Bilbao
1982–83 season
- President: Pedro Aurtenetxe
- Head coach: Javier Clemente
- Stadium: San Mamés
- Primera Division: Winners (In 1983-84 European Cup)
- Copa del Rey: Quarterfinals
- UEFA Cup: First round
- Top goalscorer: Dani (18)
Home colours	Away colours

The 1982–83 season was the 82nd season in Athletic Bilbao's history and their 52nd consecutive season in Primera Division, the top level of Spanish football.

== Summary ==
During summer the club transferred in several player such as Julio Salinas, Patxi Salinas, Ismael Urtubi and Elgezabal. On the contrary, club legend Txetxu Rojo retired after a massive 17 seasons playing with the club. 32-yr-old manager Javier Clemente clinched the league trophy for Athletic being the first title since 1959 thanks to a superb offensive line with Dani and Manu Sarabia. The team reached the first spot on the last round of the campaign after Real Madrid collapsed 0:1 at Valencia.

== Squad ==
Note: Flags indicate national team as defined under FIFA eligibility rules; some limited exceptions apply. Players may hold more than one non-FIFA nationality.

No.	Pos.	Nation	Player
-	GK	ESP	Andoni Zubizarreta
-	GK	ESP	Andoni Cedrún
-	GK	ESP	Carlos Meléndez
-	DF	ESP	Andoni Goikoetxea
-	DF	ESP	Iñigo Lizeranzu
-	DF	ESP	José Núñez
-	DF	ESP	Santiago Urquiaga
-	DF	ESP	Luis de la Fuente
-	DF	ESP	Patxi Salinas
-	DF	ESP	Agustín Gisasola
-	DF	ESP	Patxi Bolaños

No.	Pos.	Nation	Player
-	MF	ESP	Miguel de Andrés
-	MF	ESP	José Ramón Gallego
-	MF	ESP	Ismael Urtubi
-	MF	ESP	Miguel Sola
-	MF	ESP	Juan José Elgezabal
-	MF	ESP	Fernando Tirapu
-	FW	ESP	Estanislao Argote
-	FW	ESP	Dani
-	FW	ESP	Manu Sarabia
-	FW	ESP	Julio Salinas
-	FW	ESP	José María Noriega

=== Transfers ===
In
Pos.	Name	from	Type
FW	Julio Salinas	Bilbao Athletic	
MF	Ismael Urtubi	Bilbao Athletic	
DF	Patxi Salinas	Bilbao Athletic	
MF	Juan José Elgezabal		

Out
Pos.	Name	To	Type
MF	Txetxu Rojo		retired
DF	Carlos Purroy	Osasuna	
FW	Endika Guarrotxena	AD Ceuta	loan

== Competitions ==
=== Primera Division ===
==== League table ====
Pos	Team	Pld	W	D	L	GF	GA	GD	Pts	Qualification or relegation
1	Athletic Bilbao (C)	34	22	6	6	71	36	+35	50	Qualification for the European Cup first round
2	Real Madrid	34	20	9	5	57	25	+32	49	Qualification for the UEFA Cup first round
3	Atlético Madrid	34	20	6	8	56	38	+18	46	Qualification for the UEFA Cup first round
4	Barcelona	34	17	10	7	60	29	+31	44	Qualification for the Cup Winners' Cup first round (Note: Barcelona qualified for the European Cup Winners' Cup by winning the Copa del Rey.)
5	Sevilla	34	15	12	7	44	31	+13	42	Qualification for the UEFA Cup first round

Source: BDFútbol
Rules for classification: 1) Points; 2) Head-to-head results; 3) Goal difference; 4) Number of goals scored
(C) Champions

==== Position by round ====
Round	1	2	3	4	5	6	7	8	9	10	11	12	13	14	15	16	17	18	19	20	21	22	23	24	25	26	27	28	29	30	31	32	33	34
Ground	A	H	A	H	A	H	A	H	A	H	A	H	A	H	A	A	H	H	A	H	A	H	A	H	A	H	A	H	A	H	A	H	H	A
Result	D	W	W	W	L	W	L	W	D	W	W	W	W	L	W	D	W	W	W	D	L	W	D	W	D	W	W	W	L	W	L	W	W	W
Position	7	3	2	1	5	2	5	4	5	4	3	3	2	4	2	2	2	2	2	2	2	2	3	3	3	2	1	1	2	1	2	2	2	1

Source: www.lfp.es
A = Away; H = Home; W = Win; D = Draw; L = Loss; = Leader, 1983–84 European Cup; = 1983–84 UEFA Cup

==== Matches ====
5 September 1982 1	CA Osasuna	2–2	Athletic	Pamplona
19:00	Iriguíbel 25'; Martín 90'		35' (pen.) Dani; 62' Sarabia	Stadium: El Sadar; Attendance: 28 000; Referee: Iruñea

11 September 1982 2	Athletic	2–1	Valencia CF	Bilbao
20:00	Sarabia 60'; De Andrés 85'		74' Roberto	Stadium: San Mamés; Attendance: 42 000

19 September 1982 3	Real Valladolid	0–2	Athletic	Valladolid
12:00 AM			13' Sarabia; 81' Argote	Stadium: Municipal Jose Zorrilla; Attendance: 24 000

25 September 1982 4	Athletic	2–1	Sevilla FC	Bilbao
20:00	Argote 33'; Sola 40'		61' Magdaleno	Stadium: San Mamés; Attendance: 38 000

3 October 1982 5	Real Zaragoza	2–1	Athletic	Zaragoza
19:00	Herrera 17'; Valdano 75'		30' Goikoetxea	Stadium: La Romareda; Attendance: 34 000

10 October 1982 6	Athletic	4–1	Atlético Madrid	Bilbao
17:00	Goikoetxea (red card); Sola 28'; Dani 37'; Lizeranzu 47'; Noriega 67'		32' Arteche	Stadium: San Mamés; Attendance: 42 000

17 October 1982 7	Espanol	3–2	Athletic	Barcelona
17:00	Marañón 4' (pen.), 18'; Giménez 62'		(red card) Lizeranzu; (red card) Sarabia; 71' Urtubi; 75' Gallego	Stadium: Sarria; Attendance: 40.000

24 October 1982 8	Athletic	3–2	Málaga CF	Bilbao
17:00	Sarabia 52'; Noriega 57'; Urtubi 84'		17' (o.g.) Goikoetxea; 73' Juan Carlos	Stadium: San Mamés; Attendance: 30 000

31 October 1982 9	Sporting de Gijón	1–1	Athletic	Gijón
17:00	Abel 21'		1' Sarabia	Stadium: El Molinón; Attendance: 42 000

7 November 1982 10	Athletic	2–0	Racing Santander	Bilbao
17:00	Goikoetxea 17'; Sarabia 47'			Stadium: San Mamés; Attendance: 30 000

10 November 1982 11	UD Salamanca	0–1	Athletic	Villares de la Reina
20:30			8' Argote	Stadium: Helmantico; Attendance: 13 500; Referee: Villares De La Reina

21 November 1982 12	Athletic	3–2	Real Betis	Bilbao
17:00	Sarabia 25'; Dani 34'; Noriega 80'		11', 32' Poli Rincón	Stadium: San Mamés; Attendance: 35 000

28 November 1982 13	Celta	0–1	Athletic	Vigo
17:00			51' Noriega	Stadium: Balaidos; Attendance: 24 000

4 December 1982 14	Athletic	2–4	Real Madrid	Bilbao
20:30	Sarabia 45'; Noriega 80'		39' Isidro; 66' Gallego; 47', 64' Salguero	Stadium: San Mamés; Attendance: 46 000

12 December 1982 15	FC Barcelona	0–1	Athletic	Barcelona
17:00			49' Goikoetxea	Stadium: Camp Nou; Attendance: 120 000

19 December 1982 16	Real Sociedad	1–1	Athletic	San Sebastián
16:30	Uralde 60'		86' Dani	Stadium: Atotxa; Attendance: 27 000

2 January 1983 17	Athletic	3–0	UD Las Palmas	Bilbao
17:00	Urtubi 48' (pen.); Sarabia 72', 77'			Stadium: San Mamés; Attendance: 30 000

5 January 1983 18	Athletic	4–0	CA Osasuna	Bilbao
20:30	Dani 15', 42', 63' (pen.); Sarabia 81'			Stadium: San Mamés; Attendance: 40 000

8 January 1983 19	Valencia CF	1–2	Athletic	Valencia
20:30	Roberto 60'		89' Sola; 94' (pen.) Urtubi	Stadium: Luis Casanova; Attendance: 20 000

16 January 1983 20	Athletic	1–1	Real Valladolid	Bilbao
17:00	Sarabia 82'		15' Da Silva	Stadium: San Mamés; Attendance: 34 500

23 January 1983 21	Sevilla FC	2–1	Athletic	Seville
12:00	López 30'		12' Goikoetxea	Stadium: Sanchez Pizjuan; Attendance: 52 800

30 January 1983 22	Athletic	1–0	Real Zaragoza	Bilbao
17:00	Dani 29' (pen.)			Stadium: San Mamés; Attendance: 42000

6 February 1983 23	Atlético Madrid	0–0	Athletic	Madrid
16:30				Stadium: Vicente Calderon; Attendance: 54 000

9 February 1983 24	Athletic	5–2	Espanol	Bilbao
20:00	De Andrés 16', 81'; Noriega 19', 52'; Urtubi 27' (pen.)		5' J.Orejuela; 69' Marañón	Stadium: San Mamés; Attendance: 34500

20 February 1983 25	CD Málaga	0–0	Athletic	Málaga
12:00 AM				Stadium: La Rosaleda; Attendance: 25 000

27 February 1983 26	Athletic	3–0	Sporting Gijón	Bilbao
17:00	Urtubi 52'; Dani 70', 80'			Stadium: San Mamés; Attendance: 45 000

6 March 1983 27	Racing Santander	0–2	Athletic	Santander
17:00			59' Dani; 67' Sarabia	Stadium: El Sardinero; Attendance: 19 000

13 March 1983 28	Athletic	4–0	UD Salamanca	Bilbao
17:00	Dani 1', 55'; Lizeranzu 38'; Argote 46'			Stadium: San Mamés; Attendance: 43 000

20 March 1983 29	Real Betis	5–1	Athletic	Seville
17:00	Lizeranzu 6' (o.g.); Cardeñosa 16' (pen.); Poli Rincón 52', 71'; Barnes 66'		74' Noriega	Stadium: Benito Villamarin; Attendance: 40 375

26 March 1983 30	Athletic	4–0	Celta Vigo	Bilbao
17:30	Sola 19'; Dani 48'; Julio Salinas 79'; De la Fuente 89'			Stadium: San Mamés; Attendance: 34 500

3 April 1983 31	Real Madrid	2–0	Athletic	Madrid
17:00	García Hernández 58'; Pineda Garcia 80'			Stadium: Santiago Bernabeu; Attendance: 90.800

10 April 1983 32	Athletic	3–2	FC Barcelona	Bilbao
17:30	Dani 1', 79'; Sarabia 75'		86' Urbano; 89' Maradona	Stadium: San Mamés; Attendance: 46 000

17 April 1983 33	Athletic	2–0	Real Sociedad	Bilbao
17:30	Dani 26'; Argote 69'			Stadium: San Mamés; Attendance: 46 000

1 May 1983 34	UD Las Palmas	1–5	Athletic Bilbao	Las Palmas
17:30	De Andrés 3' (o.g.)		12', 57' Sarabia; 40' Dani; 69' Argote; 89' Urtubi	Stadium: Insular; Attendance: 22.000

=== Copa del Rey ===
==== Quarterfinals ====
30 March 1983	Athletic	1–0	FC Barcelona	Bilbao
20:30 CET	Dani 69' (pen.)	Report (in Spanish)		Stadium: San Mamés; Attendance: 45,000; Referee: Franco Martínez

13 April 1983	FC Barcelona	3–0	Athletic	Barcelona
20:30 CET	Carrasco 1'; Perico Alonso 69'; Maradona 88'	Report (in Spanish)		Stadium: Camp Nou; Referee: García Carrión

=== UEFA Cup ===
==== First round ====
15 September 1982	Ferencváros (Hungary)	2–1	(Spain) Athletic	Budapest
18:00	Szokolai 16'; Pölöskei 32'	Report	56' Sola	Stadium: Üllői úti Stadion; Attendance: 16,000; Referee: (Austria) Heinz Fahnler

29 September 1982	Athletic (Spain)	1–1	(Hungary) Ferencváros	Bilbao
20:00	Dani 16' (pen.)	Report	Szokolai 35'	Stadium: Estadio San Mamés; Attendance: 25,000; Referee: (Scotland) Brian McGinlay

== Statistics ==
=== Players statistics ===
No.	Pos	Nat	Player	Total		Primera Division		Copa del Rey	
No.	Pos	Nat	Player	Apps	Goals	Apps	Goals	Apps	Goals
	GK	(Spain) ESP	Andoni Zubizarreta	34	-36	34	-36		
	DF	(Spain) ESP	Santiago Urquiaga	34	0	34	0		
	DF	(Spain) ESP	Andoni Goikoetxea	24	4	24	4		
	DF	(Spain) ESP	Íñigo Liceranzu	27	2	26+1	2		
	DF	(Spain) ESP	José Núñez	30	0	30	0		
	MF	(Spain) ESP	Miguel de Andrés	30	3	30	3		
	MF	(Spain) ESP	José Ramón Gallego	28	0	28	0		
	MF	(Spain) ESP	Ismael Urtubi	34	7	22+12	7		
	FW	(Spain) ESP	Dani	32	18	32	18		
	FW	(Spain) ESP	Manuel Sarabia	33	17	29+4	17		
	FW	(Spain) ESP	Estanislao Argote	33	5	31+2	5		
	GK	(Spain) ESP	Andoni Cedrún	0	0	0	0		
	MF	(Spain) ESP	Miguel Sola	32	4	22+10	4		
	DF	(Spain) ESP	Luis de la Fuente	21	1	15+6	1		
	FW	(Spain) ESP	José María Noriega	29	8	8+21	8		
	DF	(Spain) ESP	Patxi Salinas	5	0	4+1	0		
	DF	(Spain) ESP	Agustín Gisasola	2	0	2	0		
	DF	(Spain) ESP	Patxi Bolaños	2	0	2	0		
	MF	(Spain) ESP	Fernando Tirapu	1	0	1	0		
	FW	(Spain) ESP	Julio Salinas	7	1	0+7	1		
	MF	(Spain) ESP	Juan José Elgezabal	3	0	0+3	0		
	GK	(Spain) ESP	Carlos Meléndez	0	0	0	0		
