= 1983–84 Athletic Bilbao season =

Athletic Bilbao
1983–84 season
- President: Pedro Aurtenetxe
- Head coach: Javier Clemente
- Stadium: San Mamés
- Primera Division: Winners (In 1984–85 European Cup)
- Copa del Rey: Winners
- European Cup: First round
- Top goalscorer: Manu Sarabia (9)
Home colours	Away colours

The 1983–84 season was the 83rd season in Athletic Bilbao's history and their 53rd consecutive season in Primera Division, the top level of Spanish football. Also, the club competed in the European Cup and the Copa del Rey.

== Summary ==
The season is best remembered by the club winning both La Liga and Copa del Rey. The league trophy was clinched after a closed race against Real Madrid and FC Barcelona, the manager Javier Clemente and the squad defeated arch rivals Real Sociedad and thanks to the Goal difference reached the topspot of the table for the second consecutive year. Forward Manu Sarabia was the topscorer of the squad scoring 9 league goals.

== Squad ==
Note: Flags indicate national team as defined under FIFA eligibility rules; some limited exceptions apply. Players may hold more than one non-FIFA nationality.

No.	Pos.	Nation	Player
—	GK	ESP	Andoni Zubizarreta
—	GK	ESP	Andoni Cedrún
—	GK	ESP	Carlos Meléndez
—	DF	ESP	Andoni Goikoetxea
—	DF	ESP	Iñigo Lizeranzu
—	DF	ESP	Txato Nunez
—	DF	ESP	Santiago Urkiaga
—	DF	ESP	Luis de la Fuente
—	DF	ESP	Patxi Salinas
—	DF	ESP	Genar Andrinúa
—	DF	ESP	Ruben Bilbao

No.	Pos.	Nation	Player
—	MF	ESP	Miguel de Andrés
—	MF	ESP	Txetxu Gallego
—	MF	ESP	Ismael Urtubi
—	MF	ESP	Miguel Sola
—	MF	ESP	Juan José Elgezabal
—	FW	ESP	Estanis Argote
—	FW	ESP	Endika Guarrotxena
—	FW	ESP	Dani
—	FW	ESP	Manu Sarabia
—	FW	ESP	Julio Salinas
—	FW	ESP	Txema Noriega

=== Transfers ===
In
Pos.	Name	from	Type
FW	Endika Guarrotxena	AD Ceuta	loan ended
DF	Genar Andrinúa	Bilbao Athletic	
DF	Rubén Bilbao	Bilbao Athletic	

Out
Pos.	Name	To	Type
MF	Agustín Gisasola		retired
DF	Patxi Bolaños		
MF	Fernando Tirapu	Osasuna	

==== Winter ====
In
Pos.	Name	from	Type

Out
Pos.	Name	To	Type
GK	Andoni Cedrun	Cádiz CF	loan

== Competitions ==
=== League table ===
Pos	Team	Pld	W	D	L	GF	GA	GD	Pts	Qualification or relegation
1	Athletic Bilbao (C)	34	20	9	5	53	30	+23	49	Qualification for the European Cup first round
2	Real Madrid	34	22	5	7	59	37	+22	49	Qualification for the UEFA Cup first round (Note: Valladolid qualified for the UEFA Cup as winners of the Copa de la Liga.)
3	Barcelona	34	20	8	6	62	28	+34	48	Qualification for the Cup Winners' Cup first round (Note: Barcelona qualified for the European Cup Winners' Cup as runners-up of the Copa del Rey.)
4	Atlético Madrid	34	17	8	9	53	47	+6	42	Qualification for the UEFA Cup first round
5	Real Betis	34	17	4	13	45	40	+5	38	Qualification for the UEFA Cup first round

Source: BDFútbol
Rules for classification: 1) Points; 2) Head-to-head results; 3) Goal difference; 4) Number of goals scored
(C) Champions

==== Position by round ====
Round	1	2	3	4	5	6	7	8	9	10	11	12	13	14	15	16	17	18	19	20	21	22	23	24	25	26	27	28	29	30	31	32	33	34
Ground	A	H	A	H	A	H	A	A	H	A	H	A	H	A	H	H	A	A	H	A	H	A	H	A	H	H	A	H	A	H	A	H	A	H
Result	W	W	L	D	L	W	D	D	W	D	W	D	W	D	W	W	W	W	W	W	L	L	W	D	W	D	W	W	D	W	L	W	W	W
Position	3	3	1	5	6	7	6	6	7	2	5	2	2	2	2	2	2	1	1	1	1	2	2	2	2	2	1	1	1	1	1	1	1	1

Source: www.lfp.es
A = Away; H = Home; W = Win; D = Draw; L = Loss; = Leader, 1984–85 European Cup; = 1984–85 UEFA Cup

==== Matches ====
11 September 1983 2	Real Zaragoza	1–2	Athletic	Zaragoza
	García Cortés 39'		8' Argote; 70' Endika	Stadium: La Romareda; Referee: Sánchez Arminio

18 September 1983 3	Athletic	6–3	UD Salamanca	Bilbao
	Urtubi 5'; Lizeranzu 20'; Goikoetxea 22'; Argote 24'; Argote 43'; Noriega 44'; Lizeranzu 48'	1-1	9' Ángel González; 28' Bezares; 78' Luis García	Stadium: San Mamés; Referee: Borrás del Barrio

24 September 1983 4	FC Barcelona	4–0	Athletic	Barcelona
	Periko Alonso 38'; Julio Alberto 45'; Maradona 59'; Marcos Alonso 88'; Carrasco 89'			Stadium: Camp Nou; Referee: Jiménez Madrid

01 October 1983 5	Athletic	2–2	Atlético Madrid	Bilbao
	Noriega 17'; Elgezabal 57'		59' Rubio; 67' Quique Ramos	Stadium: San Mamés; Referee: Pes Pérez

09 October 1983 6	Sevilla FC	4–1	Athletic	Seville
	Juan Carlos 12'; Juan Carlos 18'; Álvarez 61'; Ruda 76'		81' Elgezabal	Stadium: Sanchez Pizjuan; Referee: Crespo Aurre

15 October 1983 7	Athletic	1–0	Osasuna	Bilbao
	Sola 44'			Stadium: San Mamés; Referee: Mayoral Cedenilla

23 October 1983 8	Mallorca	0–0	Athletic	Palma
	Paco Martinez (penalty missed) 7'			Stadium: Lluis Sitjar; Referee: Martin Navarrete

29 October 1983 9	Espanol	0–0	Athletic	Barcelona
			(yellow card) 78' (yellow-red card) Elgezabal	Stadium: Sarria; Referee: Soriano Aladren

06 November 1983 10	Athletic	4–1	Real Murcia	Bilbao
	Noriega 13'; Sola 42'; Sola 59'; Sarabia 80'		51' Del Barrio	Stadium: San Mamés; Referee: Casajuana Rifà

09 November 1983 11	Sporting Gijón	2–2	Athletic	Gijón
	Cunningham 5'; Joaquín 60'		35' Sarabia; 66' (o.g.) Maceda	Stadium: El Molinon; Referee: Damín Rendón

20 November 1983 12	Athletic	1–0	Real Valladolid	Bilbao
	Sola 43'	Enríquez Negreira		Stadium: San Mamés

27 November 1983 13	Real Madrid	0–0	Athletic	Madrid
				Stadium: Santiago Bernabeu

04 December 1983 14	Athletic	2–0	Real Betis	Bilbao
	Sarabia 1'; Lizeranzu 7'			Stadium: San Mamés; Referee: Socorro González

11 December 1983 15	CD Málaga	0–0	Athletic	Málaga
				Stadium: La Rosaleda

14 December 1983 16	Athletic	2–0	Valencia CF	Bilbao
	Urtubi 33' (pen.); Sarabia 58'			Stadium: San Mamés; Referee: Merino González

17 December 1983 1	Athletic	3–1	Cádiz CF	Bilbao
	Vilches 3' (o.g.); Amarillo 38' (o.g.); Noriega 64'		81' (pen.) Mágico González	Stadium: San Mamés; Referee: García de Loza

31 December 1983 17	Real Sociedad	0–1	Athletic	San Sebastián
			14' Argote	Stadium: Atotxa; Referee: Álvarez Margüenda

08 January 1984 18	Cádiz CF	0–1	Athletic	Cádiz
			26' Sarabia; 45' Urtubi	Stadium: Ramon Carranza; Referee: Ceballos Borrego

15 January 1984 19	Athletic	1–0	Real Zaragoza	Bilbao
	Endika 1'			Stadium: San Mamés; Referee: Mayoral Cedenilla

22 January 1984 20	UD Salamanca	1–2	Athletic	Villares de la Reina
	Enrique 71'; Orejuela 51' (pen.)		42' Urtubi; 65' Noriega	Stadium: El Helmantico; Referee: Franco Martínez

29 January 1984 21	Athletic	1–2	FC Barcelona	Bilbao
	Argote 34'	1–1	12' Maradona; 77' Maradona	Stadium: San Mamés; Referee: Pes Pérez

04 February 1984 22	Atlético Madrid	1–0	Athletic	Madrid
	Hugo Sánchez 71'		63' Noriega	Stadium: Vicente Calderon; Referee: García de Loza

12 February 1984 23	Athletic	5–0	Sevilla FC	Bilbao
	De Andrés 31'; Urtubi 39'; Urtubi 42' (pen.); Sarabia 82'; Endika 88'			Stadium: San Mamés; Referee: Jiménez Madrid

19 February 1984 24	Osasuna	1–1	Athletic	Pamplona
	Iriguibel 33'		88' Sarabia	Stadium: El Sadar; Referee: Jiménez Moreno

26 February 1984 25	Athletic	4–0	Mallorca	Bilbao
	Sola 22'; Sarabia 27'; Urtubi 41'; Liceranzu 61'			Stadium: San Mamés; Referee: Soriano Aladrén

04 March 1984 26	Athletic	1–1	Espanol	Bilbao
	Dani 21'		42' Giménez	Stadium: San Mamés; Referee: Franco Martínez

11 March 1984 27	Real Murcia	0–1	Athletic	Murcia
			59' Sarabia	Referee: Valdés Sánchez

18 March 1984 28	Athletic	1–0	Sporting Gijón	Bilbao
	Lizeranzu 29'			Stadium: San Mamés; Referee: Álvarez Margüenda

25 March 1984 29	Real Valladolid	0–0	Athletic	Valladolid
				Stadium: Municipal Jose Zorrilla

01 April 1984 30	Athletic	2–1	Real Madrid	Bilbao
	Goikoetxea 32'; Dani 87'		23' Stielike	Stadium: San Mamés; Referee: Ramos Marcos

08 April 1984 31	Real Betis	2–0	Athletic	Seville
	Paco 22'Calderón 74'			Stadium: Benito Villamarin; Referee: Merino González

14 April 1984 32	Athletic	2–1	CD Málaga	Bilbao
	Gallego 4'; De la Fuente (red card) 75'; Urtubi 31' (pen.)		Jose Hurtado 15'	Stadium: San Mamés; Referee: Ceballos Borrego

22 April 1984 33	Valencia CF	1–2	Athletic	Valencia
	García Pitarch 80'		Dani 77'; Noriega 85'	Stadium: Luis Casanova; Referee: Sánchez Arminio

29 April 1984 34	Athletic	2–1	Real Sociedad	Bilbao
	Lizeranzu 18'; Lizeranzu 79'		68' Uralde	Stadium: San Mamés; Referee: Merino González

=== European Cup ===
==== First round ====
14 September 1983	Lech Poznań (Poland)	2–0	(Spain) Athletic	Stadion Miejski, Poznań
	Niewiadomski 35'; Okoński 44'	Report		Attendance: 30,000; Referee: Einar Halle (Norway)

28 September 1983	Athletic (Spain)	4–0	(Poland) Lech Poznań	Estadio San Mamés, Bilbao
	Goikoetxea 10'; Sola 33' (pen.); Noriega 50'; Urquiaga 84'	Report		Attendance: 45,000; Referee: Aron Schmidhuber (West Germany)

==== Second round ====
19 October 1983	Liverpool (England)	0–0	(Spain) Athletic Bilbao	Anfield, Liverpool
		Report		Attendance: 33,063; Referee: Paolo Bergamo (Italy)

2 November 1983	Athletic Bilbao (Spain)	0–1	(England) Liverpool	Estadio San Mamés, Bilbao
		Report	Rush 66'	Attendance: 47,500; Referee: Adolf Prokop (East Germany)

=== Copa del Rey ===
==== Semi-finals ====
4 April 1984	Real Madrid	0–1	Athletic	Madrid
21:00 CET		Report (in Spanish)	Urtubi 24' (pen.)	Stadium: Santiago Bernabéu; Referee: Valdés Sánchez

18 April 1984	Athletic	0–1 (a.e.t.) (4–3 p)	Real Madrid	Bilbao
20:15 CET		Report (in Spanish)	Pineda 44'	Stadium: San Mamés; Referee: Enríquez Negreira
	Penalties
	Urtubi (penalty scored); Dani (penalty scored); Argote (penalty missed); Sola (penalty scored); Núñez (penalty scored)		(penalty missed) Camacho; (penalty scored) Salguero; (penalty missed) Stielike; (penalty scored) Chendo; (penalty scored) Juanito

==== Final ====
5 May 1984	Athletic	1–0	FC Barcelona	Madrid
20:15 CET	Endika 14'	Report		Stadium: Santiago Bernabéu; Attendance: 100,000; Referee: Ángel Franco Martínez

== Statistics ==
=== Players statistics ===
No.	Pos	Nat	Player	Total		Primera Division		Copa del Rey		European Cup	
No.	Pos	Nat	Player	Apps	Goals	Apps	Goals	Apps	Goals	Apps	Goals
	GK	(Spain) ESP	Andoni Zubizarreta	34	-30	34	-30				
	DF	(Spain) ESP	Santiago Urkiaga	34	0	34	0				
	DF	(Spain) ESP	Andoni Goikoetxea	28	2	28	2				
	DF	(Spain) ESP	Inigo Lizeranzu	32	7	32	7				
	DF	(Spain) ESP	Luis de la Fuente	32	0	23+9	0				
	MF	(Spain) ESP	Miguel de Andrés	25	1	25	1				
	MF	(Spain) ESP	Txetxu Gallego	29	1	22+7	1				
	MF	(Spain) ESP	Ismael Urtubi	28	6	26+2	6				
	FW	(Spain) ESP	Txema Noriega	31	6	24+7	6				
	FW	(Spain) ESP	Manu Sarabia	32	9	22+10	9				
	FW	(Spain) ESP	Estanis Argote	32	5	32	5				
	GK	(Spain) ESP	Andoni Cedrún	0	0	0	0				
	MF	(Spain) ESP	Miguel Sola	25	5	21+4	5				
	DF	(Spain) ESP	Txato Nunez	20	0	18+2	0				
	FW	(Spain) ESP	Endika Guarrotxena	23	3	14+9	3				
	DF	(Spain) ESP	Patxi Salinas	14	0	8+6	0				
	FW	(Spain) ESP	Dani	10	3	4+6	3				
	MF	(Spain) ESP	Juan José Elgezabal	4	2	4	2				
	FW	(Spain) ESP	Julio Salinas	6	0	2+4	0				
	DF	(Spain) ESP	Genar Andrinúa	1	0	1	0				
	FW	(Spain) ESP	Rubén Bilbao	1	0	0+1	0				
	GK	(Spain) ESP	Carlos Meléndez	0	0	0	0				

- Source: https://www.bdfutbol.com/en/t/t1983-846.html
