= 1983–84 FC Barcelona season =

85th season in existence of FC Barcelona

FC Barcelona
1983–84 season
- President: Josep Lluís Núñez
- Manager: César Luis Menotti
- La Liga: 3rd
- Copa del Rey: Runners-up
- Copa de la Liga: Semi-finals
- Supercopa de España: Winners
- Cup Winners' Cup: Quarter-finals
- Top goalscorer: League: Marcos Alonso (12); All: Diego Maradona (15)

The 1983–84 season was the 85th season for FC Barcelona.

== Squad ==
Note: Flags indicate national team as defined under FIFA eligibility rules; some limited exceptions apply. Players may hold more than one non-FIFA nationality.

No.	Pos.	Nation	Player
—	GK	ESP	Urruti
—	GK	ESP	Amador
—	GK	ESP	Pello Artola
—	DF	ESP	Migueli
—	DF	ESP	Julio Alberto
—	DF	ESP	Gerardo
—	DF	ESP	Esteban Vigo
—	DF	ESP	Antonio Olmo
—	DF	ESP	José Ramón Alexanko
—	DF	ESP	Josep Moratalla
—	DF	ESP	Manolo
—	MF	ESP	Víctor
—	MF	ESP	Urbano
—	MF	ESP	Periko Alonso

No.	Pos.	Nation	Player
—	MF	GER	Bernd Schuster
—	MF	ESP	Tente
—	FW	ESP	Marcos
—	FW	ESP	Pichi Alonso
—	FW	ARG	Jorge Luis Gabrich
—	FW	ESP	Lobo Carrasco
—	FW	ESP	Juan Carlos Rojo
—	FW	ARG	Diego Armando Maradona
—	FW	ESP	Enrique Morán
—	FW	ESP	Paco Clos
—	FW	ESP	Quini

== Non-competitive ==
=== Pre-season ===
==== Friendlies ====
10-08-1983 FRIENDLY ANDERLECHT-BARCELONA 1-1

17-08-1983 Trofeo Costa Blanca HERCULES-BARCELONA 1-3

22-08-1983 Joan Gamper Trophy BARCELONA-NOTTINGHAM FOREST 2-0

23 August 1983 Joan Gamper Trophy Final	Barcelona	2–1	Borussia Dortmund	Barcelona, Spain
	Maradona 69'; Quini 81'		Rüssmann 21'	Stadium: Camp Nou; Attendance: 105,000; Referee: Ángel Franco Martínez (Spain)

27 August 1983 Centenary of Bordeaux Round 1	Bordeaux	2–0	Barcelona	Bordeaux, France
	Giresse 57'; Trésor 74'		Schuster (yellow card) 38'; Periko Alonso (yellow card) 46'; Alberto 52'; Maradona (yellow card) 87'	Stadium: Stade Municipal; Referee: Mohamed Benali (France)

28-08-1983 Centenary of Bordeaux NANTES BARCELONA 2-3

=== Mid-season ===
==== Friendlies ====
08-12-1983 FRIENDLY HOSPITALET-BARCELONA 2-5

20-12-1983 FRIENDLY SANT ANDREU-BARCELONA 1-2

=== Post-season ===
08-05-1984 FRIENDLY UDINESE-BARCELONA 4-1

28 May 1984 Trans-Atlantic Challenge Cup Semi-Finals	Barcelona	3–5	New York Cosmos	East Rutherford, New Jersey, United States
13:30 EDT (UTC−04:00)	Husillos 4', 11', 90', (yellow card) 41'; Maradona (penalty missed) 73		Neeskens (yellow card) 18', (goal) 44' (pen.); Cabañas 20'; Moyers 24', 66'; Eskandarian (yellow card) 63'; Bogićević 78'	Stadium: Giants Stadium; Referee: Edward Bellon (United States)

3 June 1984 Trans-Atlantic Challenge Cup Third-place final	Fluminense	2–2	Barcelona	East Rutherford, New Jersey, United States
13:30 EDT (UTC−04:00)				Stadium: Giants Stadium; Referee: Bob Evans (United States)

26-06-1984 FRIENDLY MARTINENC-BARCELONA 3-7

== Competitions ==
=== Overall ===
Competition	Started round	Final position / round	First match	Last match
Supercopa de España	Final	Winner	26 October 1983	30 November 1983
Primera División	—	3rd	4 September 1983	29 April 1984
Copa de la Liga	Second round	Semi-Finals	19 May 1984	21 June 1984
Copa del Rey	Round of 16	Final	25 January 1984	5 May 1984
Cup Winners' Cup	First round	Quarter-finals	14 September 1983	21 March 1984

Updated to match played 22 June 1984
Source: Competitions

=== Supercopa de España ===
26 October 1983 First leg	Athletic Bilbao	1–3	Barcelona	Bilbao
20:00 (CEST+01:00)	Sarabia 45'		Alexanko 31'; Carrasco 48'; Rojo 77'	Stadium: San Mamés; Attendance: 38,000; Referee: Raúl García de Loza

30 November 1983 Second leg	Barcelona	0–1	Athletic Bilbao	Barcelona
21:15 (CEST+01:00)	Alberto (yellow card) 26'; Vigo (yellow card) 32'		Endika 2'; Salinas (yellow card) 25'; Murúa (yellow card) 48'	Stadium: Camp Nou; Attendance: 18,000; Referee: Emilio Soriano Aladrén

=== Primera División ===
==== League table ====
Pos	Team	Pld	W	D	L	GF	GA	GD	Pts	Qualification or relegation
1	Athletic Bilbao (C)	34	20	9	5	53	30	+23	49	Qualification for the European Cup first round
2	Real Madrid	34	22	5	7	59	37	+22	49	Qualification for the UEFA Cup first round (Note: Valladolid qualified for the UEFA Cup as winners of the Copa de la Liga.)
3	Barcelona	34	20	8	6	62	28	+34	48	Qualification for the Cup Winners' Cup first round (Note: Barcelona qualified for the European Cup Winners' Cup as runners-up of the Copa del Rey.)
4	Atlético Madrid	34	17	8	9	53	47	+6	42	Qualification for the UEFA Cup first round
5	Real Betis	34	17	4	13	45	40	+5	38	Qualification for the UEFA Cup first round

Source: BDFútbol
Rules for classification: 1) Points; 2) Head-to-head results; 3) Goal difference; 4) Number of goals scored
(C) Champions

==== Results summary ====
Overall								Home						Away					
Pld	W	D	L	GF	GA	GD	Pts	W	D	L	GF	GA	GD	W	D	L	GF	GA	GD
34	20	8	6	62	28	+34	68	12	4	1	38	9	+29	8	4	5	24	19	+5

Last updated: 22 June 1984.

==== Results by matchday ====
Matchday	1	2	3	4	5	6	7	8	9	10	11	12	13	14	15	16	17	18	19	20	21	22	23	24	25	26	27	28	29	30	31	32	33	34
Ground	A	H	A	H	A	H	A	H	A	H	A	H	A	H	A	A	H	H	A	H	A	H	A	H	A	H	A	H	A	H	A	H	H	A
Result	L	W	W	W	D	W	L	L	D	W	W	D	D	D	W	L	W	W	L	D	W	W	D	W	L	W	W	D	W	W	W	W	W	W
Position	14	11	6	3	2	2	4	7	8	4	1	3	3	3	3	3	3	3	3	4	3	3	3	3	4	4	3	3	3	3	3	3	3	3
Points	0	2	4	6	7	9	9	9	10	12	14	15	16	17	19	19	21	23	23	24	26	28	29	31	31	33	35	36	38	40	42	44	46	48

A = Away; H = Home; W = Win; D = Draw; L = Loss

==== Matches ====
4 September 1983 1	Sevilla	3–1	Barcelona	Seville
	Nimo 55'; Montero 70'; Pintinho 89' (pen.)		Alexanko 25'	Stadium: Ramón Sánchez Pizjuán; Referee: José Donato Pes Pérez

10 September 1983 2	Barcelona	1–0	Osasuna	Barcelona
	Carrasco 34'		Lecumberri (red card) 84'	Stadium: Camp Nou; Referee: José Ramón Gutiérrez Fernández

18 September 1983 3	Mallorca	1–4	Barcelona	Palma de Mallorca
	Armstrong 18'		Schuster 38'; Maradona 44'; Marcos 74'; Víctor 80'	Stadium: Lluís Sitjar; Referee: Emilio Soriano Aladrén

24 September 1983 4	Barcelona	4–0	Athletic Bilbao	Barcelona
	Periko Alonso 38'; Alberto 45'; Vigo 88'; Carrasco 89'			Stadium: Camp Nou; Referee: Bartolomé Jiménez Madrid

2 October 1983 5	Murcia	0–0	Barcelona	Murcia
				Stadium: La Condomina; Referee: Joaquín Ramos Marcos

9 October 1983 6	Barcelona	4–0	Sporting de Gijón	Barcelona
	Jiménez 4' (o.g.); Quini 25'; Carrasco 57'; Marcos 62'			Stadium: Camp Nou; Referee: Victoriano Sánchez Arminio

15 October 1983 7	Valladolid	2–1	Barcelona	Valladolid
	Pepín 32' da Silva 63'		Víctor 79'	Stadium: José Zorrilla; Referee: Joaquin Urio Velazquez

22 October 1983 8	Barcelona	1–2	Real Madrid	Barcelona
20:15 (CEST+01:00)	Quini 17' (pen.); Víctor (yellow card) 28'; Alexanko (yellow card) 45'		Juanito 12' (pen.); Santillana 20'; Stielike (yellow card) 73'; Pineda (yellow card) 83'	Stadium: Camp Nou; Referee: Joaquín Ramos Marcos

30 October 1983 9	Betis	0–0	Barcelona	Seville
				Stadium: Benito Villamarin; Referee: Idelfonso Urizar Azpitarte

6 November 1983 10	Barcelona	1–0	Málaga	Barcelona
	Carrasco 7'			Stadium: Camp Nou; Referee: José Ramón Gutiérrez Fernández

9 November 1983 11	Valencia	2–4	Barcelona	Valencia
	Kempes 37'; Urruti 61'		Carrasco 19', 89' (pen.); Alexanko 24'; Alberto 62'	Stadium: Mestalla; Referee: Augusto Lamo Castillo

20 November 1983 12	Barcelona	0–0	Real Sociedad	Barcelona
				Stadium: Camp Nou; Referee: Ángel Franco Martínez

26 November 1983 13	Cádiz	1–1	Barcelona	Cádiz
	Dieguito (yellow card) 11'; González 22'		Alexanko 40'	Stadium: Ramón de Carranza; Referee: José Donato Pes Pérez

4 December 1983 14	Barcelona	0–0	Real Zaragoza	Barcelona
				Stadium: Camp Nou; Referee: Joaquin Urio Velazquez

11 December 1983 15	Salamanca	1–3	Barcelona	Villares de la Reina
	Pérez Aguerri 65' (pen.)		Quini 31'; Tente 50'; Marcos 53'	Stadium: Helmántico; Referee: Antonio Martín Navarrete

14 December 1983 16	Espanyol	1–0	Barcelona	Barcelona
	Giménez 84'			Stadium: Sarrià; Referee: Raúl García de Loza

31 December 1983 17	Barcelona	2–1	Atlético Madrid	Barcelona
	Marcelino 8' (o.g.); Vigo 12'		Pedraza 79'; Rubio (red card) 82'	Stadium: Camp Nou; Referee: Miguel Ángel Marín López

8 January 1984 18	Barcelona	3–1	Sevilla	Barcelona
	Maradona 17', 68'; Marcos 23'		Montero 48' (pen.)	Stadium: Camp Nou; Referee: Victoriano Sánchez Arminio

15 January 1984 19	Osasuna	4–2	Barcelona	Pamplona
	Iriguibel 8'; Echeverria 11', (red card) 50'; Rípodas 20'; Monreal 59'		Maradona 38' (pen.), 85' (pen.); Urruti (red card) 50'	Stadium: El Sadar; Referee: Emilio Soriano Aladrén

22 January 1984 20	Barcelona	1–1	Mallorca	Barcelona
	Marcos 59'		Verón 39'	Stadium: Camp Nou; Referee: Manuel Álvarez Margüenda

29 January 1984 21	Athletic Bilbao	1–2	Barcelona	Bilbao
	Argote 34'		Maradona 12', 77'	Stadium: San Mamés; Referee: José Donato Pes Pérez

5 February 1984 22	Barcelona	2–0	Murcia	Barcelona
	Schuster 44', 87'			Stadium: Camp Nou; Referee: José Merino González

12 February 1984 23	Sporting de Gijón	0–0	Barcelona	Gijón
				Stadium: El Molinón – Enrique Castro Quini; Referee: Ángel Franco Martínez

18 February 1984 24	Barcelona	5–0	Valladolid	Barcelona
	Carrasco 31'; Maradona 57', 68'; Marcos 63'; Schuster 74'			Stadium: Camp Nou; Referee: José Luis García Carrión

25 February 1984 25	Real Madrid	2–1	Barcelona	Madrid
	Juanito 16'; Ángel (yellow card) 48'; Bernardo (yellow card) 57'; Santillana 80', (yellow card) 86'		Maradona 56', (yellow card) 59'; Tente 59'	Stadium: Santiago Bernabéu; Referee: Joaquín Ramos Marcos

3 March 1984 26	Barcelona	3–1	Betis	Barcelona
	Alberto 53'; Marcos 62'; Schuster 89'		Suárez 22'	Stadium: Camp Nou; Referee: Miguel Ángel Marín López

11 March 1984 27	Málaga	0–1	Barcelona	Málaga
			Schuster 86'	Stadium: La Rosaleda; Referee: Joaquin Urio Velazquez

17 March 1984 28	Barcelona	0–0	Valencia	Barcelona
				Stadium: Camp Nou; Referee: José Merino González

25 March 1984 29	Real Sociedad	0–1	Barcelona	San Sebastián
			Schuster 19' (pen.)	Stadium: Atocha; Referee: Raúl García de Loza

31 March 1984 30	Barcelona	4–1	Cádiz	Barcelona
	Pichi Alonso 1', 52'; Carrasco 62'; Marcos 88'		González 82'	Stadium: Camp Nou; Referee: José Luis García Carrión

7 April 1984 31	Real Zaragoza	0–1	Barcelona	Zaragoza
			Carrasco 74'	Stadium: La Romareda; Referee: Victoriano Sánchez Arminio

15 April 1984 32	Barcelona	2–0	Salamanca	Barcelona
	Moratalla 1'; Maradona 9'			Stadium: Camp Nou; Referee: Manuel Álvarez Margüenda

22 April 1984 33	Barcelona	5–2	Espanyol	Barcelona
	Marcos 8', 20', 34', 86'; Carrasco 12'; Maradona (red card) 40'		Zúñiga 27', (red card) 53'; Márquez 59'	Stadium: Camp Nou; Referee: José Donato Pes Pérez

29 April 1984 34	Atlético Madrid	1–2	Barcelona	Madrid
	Rubio 17'		Rojo 7'; Carrasco 25'	Stadium: Vicente Calderón; Referee: Joaquín Ramos Marcos

=== Copa del Rey ===
25-01-1984 Copa del Rey HERCULES-BARCELONA 2-1

08-02-1984 Copa del Rey BARCELONA-HERCULES 3-0

22-02-1984 Copa del Rey BARCELONA-OSASUNA 4-0

14-03-1984 Copa del Rey OSASUNA-BARCELONA 3-2

04-04-1984 Copa del Rey BARCELONA-LAS PALMAS 2-1

18-04-1984 Copa del Rey LAS PALMAS-BARCELONA 1-0 /2-4/ PENALTY

5 May 1984 Final	Athletic Bilbao	1–0	Barcelona	Madrid
20:15 (CEST+02:00)	Endika 14'; Salinas (yellow card) 21'; Urtubi (yellow card) 26'; Liceranzu (yellow card) 37'	Report	Carrasco (yellow card) 8'; Víctor (yellow card) 53'; Schuster (yellow card) 57'; Alexanko (yellow card) 62'	Stadium: Santiago Bernabéu; Attendance: 100,000; Referee: Ángel Franco Martínez

=== Copa de la Liga ===
19-05-1984 Copa de la Liga BARCELONA-R.SOCIEDAD 3-0

27-05-1984 Copa de la Liga R.SOCIEDAD-BARCELONA 2-0

03-06-1984 Copa de la Liga MALLORCA-BARCELONA 2-1

09-06-1984 Copa de la Liga BARCELONA-MALLORCA 3-2 /5-4/ PENALS

16-06-1984 Copa de la Liga BARCELONA-AT.MADRID 1-2

21-06-1984 Copa de la Liga AT.MADRID-BARCELONA 2-1

=== Cup Winners' Cup ===
==== First round ====
14 September 1983 First leg	Magdeburg (Germany)	1–5	(Spain) Barcelona	Magdeburg
	Pommerenke 58'		Schuster 3'; Maradona 14', 76', 79'; Periko Alonso 66'	Stadium: Ernst Grube; Attendance: 32,000; Referee: Luigi Agnolin (Italy)

28 September 1983 Second leg	Barcelona (Spain)	2-0	(Germany) Magdeburg	Barcelona
	Quini 32', 78'			Stadium: Camp Nou; Attendance: 17,800; Referee: Bruno Galler (Switzerland)

==== Second round ====
19 October 1983 First leg	NEC Nijmegen (Netherlands)	2–3	(Spain) Barcelona	Nijmegen
	Janssen 5'; Mommertz 44'		Migueli 45', (red card) 56' van Rossum 55' (o.g.); Urbano 70'	Stadium: Goffertstadion; Attendance: 28,200; Referee: Heinz Fahnler (Austria)

2 November 1983 Second leg	Barcelona (Spain)	2-0	(Netherlands) NEC Nijmegen	Barcelona
	Periko Alonso 3'; Clos 43'			Stadium: Camp Nou; Attendance: 16,500; Referee: Károly Palotai (Hungary)

==== Quarter-finals ====
7 March 1984 First leg	Barcelona (Spain)	2-0	(England) Manchester United	Barcelona
	Hogg 33' (o.g.); Rojo 89'			Stadium: Camp Nou; Attendance: 94,000; Referee: Michel Vautrot (France)

21 March 1984 Second leg	Manchester United (England)	3-0	(Spain) Barcelona	Manchester
	Robson 23', 50'; Stapleton 53'			Stadium: Old Trafford; Attendance: 58,350; Referee: Paolo Casarin (Italy)
