= 1984 Copa del Rey final =

Copa del Rey 1984 final
- Event: 1983–84 Copa del Rey
Athletic Bilbao	Barcelona
1	0
- Date: 5 May 1984
- Venue: Santiago Bernabéu Stadium, Madrid
- Referee: Ángel Franco Martínez
- Attendance: 100,000

The 1984 Copa del Rey final was the 82nd final of the Copa del Rey. The final was played at Santiago Bernabéu Stadium in Madrid, on 5 May 1984, being won by Athletic Bilbao, who beat Barcelona 1–0. The match is well known due to a huge brawl between players at the end of the game which resulted in the multi-month suspension of three players from each side (including Diego Maradona).

== Match details ==
5 May 1984
20:15 CET

Athletic Bilbao	1–0	Barcelona
Endika 14'	Report

Santiago Bernabéu, Madrid
Attendance: 100,000
Referee: Ángel Franco Martínez

Athletic Bilbao

Barcelona

GK	1	(Spain) Andoni Zubizarreta
DF	2	(Spain) Santiago Urkiaga
DF	4	(Spain) Iñigo Liceranzu	(yellow card) 37'
DF	5	(Spain) Andoni Goikoetxea
DF	3	(Spain) José María Núñez
MF	8	(Spain) Patxi Salinas	(yellow card) 21'
MF	6	(Spain) Miguel de Andrés
MF	10	(Spain) Ismael Urtubi	(yellow card) 26'
FW	7	(Spain) Dani Ruiz-Bazán (c)
FW	9	(Spain) Endika Guarrotxena		(substituted off) 61'
FW	11	(Spain) Estanislao Argote		(substituted off) 87'
Substitutes:
GK	12	(Spain) Carlos Meléndez
MF	13	(Spain) José Ramón Gallego		(substituted on) 87'
DF	14	(Spain) Luis de la Fuente
FW	15	(Spain) Manuel Sarabia		(substituted on) 61'
MF	16	(Spain) Miguel Ángel Sola
Manager:
(Spain) Javier Clemente

GK	1	(Spain) Urruti
DF	2	(Spain) Tente Sánchez (c)
DF	6	(Spain) José Ramón Alexanko	(yellow card) 62'
DF	3	(Spain) Migueli
DF	4	(Spain) Julio Alberto
MF	11	(Spain) Marcos
MF	5	(Spain) Víctor	(yellow card) 53'
MF	8	(West Germany) Bernd Schuster	(yellow card) 57'
MF	9	(Spain) Juan Carlos Rojo		(substituted off) 63'
FW	10	(Argentina) Diego Maradona
FW	7	(Spain) Francisco Carrasco	(yellow card) 8'
Substitutes:
DF	12	(Spain) Antonio Olmo
GK	13	(Spain) Pedro María Artola
MF	14	(Spain) Esteban
MF	15	(Spain) Paco Clos		(substituted on) 63'
FW	16	(Spain) Pichi Alonso
Manager:
(Argentina) César Luis Menotti

Match rules

- 90 minutes
- 30 minutes of extra-time if necessary
- Penalty shoot-out if scores still level
- Five named substitutes
- Maximum of two substitutions

== See also ==
- Athletic–Barcelona clásico
