= 1983 Supercopa de España =

Athletic Bilbao	Barcelona
2	3
- on aggregate

First leg
Athletic Bilbao	Barcelona
1	3
- Date: 26 October 1983
- Venue: San Mamés, Bilbao
- Referee: Raúl García de Loza

Second leg
Barcelona	Athletic Bilbao
0	1
- Date: 30 November 1983
- Venue: Camp Nou, Barcelona
- Referee: Emilio Soriano Aladrén

The 1983 Supercopa de España was two-leg Spanish football matches played on 26 October and 30 November 1983. It contested by Barcelona, winners of the 1982–83 Copa del Rey, and Athletic Bilbao, winners of the 1982–83 La Liga.

== Match details ==
=== First leg ===
26 October 1983
20:00 CET

Athletic Bilbao	1–3	Barcelona
Sarabia 45'	Report	Alexanko 31'; Carrasco 48'; Rojo 77'

San Mamés, Bilbao
Attendance: 38,000
Referee: Raúl García de Loza

Athletic Bilbao	Barcelona

Athletic Bilbao:
GK	(Spain) Andoni Zubizarreta
DF	(Spain) Santiago Urquiaga
DF	(Spain) Íñigo Liceranzu
DF	(Spain) Patxi Salinas
DF	(Spain) Luis de la Fuente	(substituted off) 63'
MF	(Spain) Miguel de Andrés
MF	(Spain) José Ramón Gallego (c)	(substituted off) 63'
MF	(Spain) Ismael Urtubi
FW	(Spain) José María Noriega
FW	(Spain) Manuel Sarabia
FW	(Spain) Estanislao Argote
Substitutes:
FW	(Spain) Miguel Ángel Sola	(substituted on) 63'
MF	(Spain) Juan José Elgezábal	(substituted on) 63'
Manager:
(Spain) Javier Clemente

Barcelona:
GK	(Spain) Urruti
DF	(Spain) Tente Sánchez (c)
DF	(Spain) José Ramón Alexanko
DF	(Spain) Migueli
DF	(Spain) Julio Alberto
MF	(Spain) Urbano
MF	(Spain) Periko Alonso
MF	(Spain) Víctor
MF	(Spain) Esteban	(substituted off) 73'
FW	(Spain) Francisco Carrasco
FW	(Spain) Marcos	(substituted off) 82'
Substitutes:
FW	(Spain) Juan Carlos Rojo	(substituted on) 73'
FW	(Spain) Paco Clos	(substituted on) 82'
Manager:
(Argentina) César Luis Menotti

=== Second leg ===
30 November 1983
21:15 CET

Barcelona	0–1	Athletic Bilbao
	Report	Endika 2'

Camp Nou, Barcelona
Attendance: 18,000
Referee: Soriano Aladrén

Barcelona	Athletic Bilbao

Barcelona:
GK	(Spain) Urruti
DF	(Spain) Tente Sánchez (c)
DF	(Spain) José Ramón Alexanko
DF	(Spain) Migueli
DF	(Spain) Julio Alberto	(yellow card) 26'
MF	(Spain) Urbano		(substituted off) 67'
MF	(Spain) Periko Alonso
MF	(Spain) Víctor
MF	(Spain) Esteban	(yellow card) 32'	(substituted off) 46'
FW	(Spain) Francisco Carrasco
FW	(Spain) Marcos
Substitutes:
FW	(Spain) Pichi Alonso		(substituted on) 46'
FW	(Spain) Quini		(substituted on) 67'
Manager:
(Argentina) César Luis Menotti

Athletic Bilbao:
GK	(Spain) Andoni Zubizarreta (c)
DF	(Spain) Santiago Urquiaga
DF	(Spain) Genar Andrinúa
DF	(Spain) Patxi Bolaños
DF	(Spain) Luis de la Fuente
MF	(Spain) Miguel Ángel Sola		(substituted off) 30'
MF	(Spain) Patxi Salinas	(yellow card) 25'
MF	(Spain) Rubén Bilbao
FW	(Spain) Edorta Murua	(yellow card) 48'
FW	(Spain) Julio Salinas
FW	(Spain) Endika
Substitutes:
MF	(Spain) Pizo Gómez		(substituted on) 30'
Manager:
(Spain) Javier Clemente

== See also ==
- Athletic–Barcelona clásico
- 1983–84 La Liga
- 1983–84 Copa del Rey
- 1983–84 Athletic Bilbao season
- 1983–84 FC Barcelona season
