= Javier Urruticoechea =

Spanish footballer (1952–2001)

Urruti
Personal information
- Full name: Francisco Javier González Urruticoechea
- Date of birth: 17 February 1952
- Place of birth: San Sebastián, Spain
- Date of death: 24 May 2001 (aged 49)
- Place of death: Esplugues de Llobregat, Spain
- Height: 1.82 m (6 ft 0 in)
- Position: Goalkeeper

Youth career
- 1967–1969: Lengokoak

Senior career*
| Years | Team | Apps | (Gls) |
| 1969–1972 | San Sebastián | | |
| 1972–1977 | Real Sociedad | 66 | (0) |
| 1977–1981 | Espanyol | 121 | (0) |
| 1981–1988 | Barcelona | 120 | (0) |

International career
| 1979 | Spain U23 | 2 | (0) |
| 1974 | Spain amateur | 2 | (0) |
| 1980–1981 | Spain B | 5 | (0) |
| 1978–1980 | Spain | 5 | (0) |
| 1979–1980 | Euskadi XI | 2 | (0) |
- * Club domestic league appearances and goals

Francisco Javier González Urruticoechea (17 February 1952 – 24 May 2001), known as Urruti, was a Spanish professional footballer who played as a goalkeeper.

At FC Barcelona, a club known for goalkeepers like Ferenc Plattkó, Antoni Ramallets, Juan Velasco and Ricardo Zamora, he became an important player, playing 307 La Liga games over the course of 16 seasons and also representing in the competition Real Sociedad and Espanyol. Urruti represented Spain in three World Cups.

In 2001, he died in a road accident near Barcelona.

== Club career ==
Born in San Sebastián, Gipuzkoa, Urruti played as a junior with Lengokoak before joining Real Sociedad in 1969, spending three full years with the reserve team. Following the departure of José Ramón Esnaola, he maintained a battle for first-choice status with Luis Arconada with a third talented goalkeeper Pedro Artola also in contention for the place.

After Arconada finally became the established starter, Urruti moved to RCD Espanyol, where he won the Don Balón award in 1981 (Spanish Footballer of the Year), moving across the city after that campaign to join FC Barcelona.

In his third year, Urruti won the Ricardo Zamora Trophy while playing in all the matches safe one. He was a prominent member of the Catalonia team coached by Terry Venables that won the league in 1985 and then reached the final of the European Cup in the following year; on 25 March 1985, in a game against Real Valladolid, his penalty save against Mágico González effectively clinched the title.

During the second leg of the European Cup semi-final against IFK Göteborg, Urruti successfully protested to the referee about a conceded goal after he spotted the ball had gone out of play – Barcelona were trailing 3–0 from the first leg and the decision kept them in the game. They eventually drew level, and in the subsequent penalty shootout he saved a crucial penalty and then scored one; the final with FC Steaua București, however, was to end in disappointment as, although he saved two shots in the shootout (after 0–0 in regulation), his Romanian counterpart, Helmut Duckadam, stopped all four.

After Andoni Zubizarreta, another Basque, arrived from Athletic Bilbao in 1986, Urruti was pushed to the bench and only appeared in one league match in his final two seasons combined, later being the club's goalkeeper coach. On 24 May 2001, he died after his car hit the central barrier of a ring road in Esplugues de Llobregat, Barcelona, at just 49; an annual golf tournament, the Memorial Javier Urruti, was subsequently played in his honour.

== International career ==
Urruti played five times for Spain in a two-year span, and was a member of the Spanish squads for the 1978, 1982 and 1986 FIFA World Cups, also being picked for UEFA Euro 1980. His debut came in a friendly with Norway on 29 March 1978, in Gijón; however, his struggles at the club level translated to the international front, as he was never able to replace fellow Basques Arconada and Zubizarreta.

Urruti also earned two caps for the Basque Country national team.

== Honours ==
Barcelona

- La Liga: 1984–85
- Copa del Rey: 1982–83, 1987–88
- Supercopa de España: 1983
- Copa de la Liga: 1983, 1986
- European Cup Winners' Cup: 1981–82
- European Cup runner-up: 1985–86

Individual

- Don Balón Award – Spanish Footballer of the Year: 1980–81
- Zamora Trophy: 1983–84
