= Julio Alberto =

Spanish footballer

Personal information
- Full name: Julio Alberto Moreno Casas
- Date of birth: 7 October 1958 (age 68)
- Place of birth: Candás, Spain
- Height: 1.77 m (5 ft 10 in)
- Position: Left-back

Youth career
- Atlético Madrid

Senior career*
Years	Team	Apps	(Gls)
1977–1978	Atlético Madrileño	2	(0)
1978–1982	Atlético Madrid	67	(2)
1979–1980	→ Recreativo (loan)	8	(1)
1982–1991	Barcelona	202	(9)
Total		279	(12)

International career
1978	Spain U21	4	(0)
1982	Spain U23	1	(0)
1983	Spain amateur	2	(0)
1981	Spain B	4	(0)
1984–1988	Spain	34	(0)
Medal record
Representing Spain
UEFA European Championship
Runner-up	1984 France
- * Club domestic league appearances and goals

Julio Alberto Moreno Casas (born 7 October 1958), known as Julio Alberto, is a Spanish former professional footballer who played as a left-back.

During his career he played mainly for Atlético Madrid and Barcelona, amassing La Liga totals of 269 matches and 11 goals.

A Spain international in the mid-to-late 1980s, Julio Alberto represented the nation at the 1986 World Cup and Euro 1984.

== Club career ==
Born in Candás, Asturias, Julio Alberto was a product of Atlético Madrid's youth system, featuring rarely for the club initially and also serving a Segunda División loan stint with Recreativo de Huelva in 1979–80. Fully promoted to the first team for the following campaign, he totalled 58 La Liga games over the next two seasons, subsequently attracting interest from FC Barcelona.

With Barça, the attacking-minded Julio Alberto played a further nine years, with opposed fates: he was a key element in the side's 1984–85 league conquest and, the following campaign, scored a stunning goal against Juventus FC in the semi-finals of the European Cup, a 1–0 home win (eventually 2–1 on aggregate). He would also start in the penalty shootout loss to FC Steaua București in the final.

From 1988 to 1991, however, Julio Alberto only appeared in 29 matches as the "Dream Team" was coming to fruition, retiring after just three appearances in the latter season as Barcelona won the national championship.

== International career ==
Julio Alberto earned 34 caps for Spain in four years, and was included in the squad for UEFA Euro 1984 (appearing in all the games for the runners-up) and the 1986 FIFA World Cup. His debut came on 29 February in a friendly leading to Euro 1984, against Luxembourg, and he received the game's only yellow card in a 1–0 away victory.

== Post-retirement ==
After retiring, Julio Alberto fell into a deep depression which led to a severe drug addiction. He recovered eventually, becoming a lecturer on the subject while he also began assisting former club Barcelona in a community role, working with fans and the foundation.

== Honours ==
Barcelona

- La Liga: 1984–85, 1990–91
- Copa del Rey: 1982–83, 1987–88, 1989–90
- Supercopa de España: 1983
- Copa de la Liga: 1983, 1986
- UEFA Cup Winners' Cup: 1988–89
- European Cup runner-up: 1985–86

Spain

- UEFA European Championship runner-up: 1984
