= Agustín Guisasola =

Spanish footballer

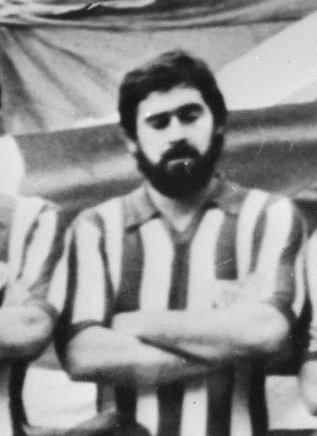
- Guisasola in 1977

Personal information
- Full name: Agustín Guisasola Zabala
- Date of birth: 22 July 1952 (age 74)
- Place of birth: Eibar, Spain
- Height: 1.82 m (6 ft 0 in)
- Position: Defender

Youth career
- Eibar

Senior career*
Years	Team	Apps	(Gls)
1969–1971	Eibar		
1971–1983	Athletic Bilbao	256	(17)

International career
1970	Spain U18	1	(0)
1971	Spain U23	2	(0)
1971–1975	Spain amateur	6	(0)
1980	Spain	1	(0)
- * Club domestic league appearances and goals

Agustín Guisasola Zabala (born 22 July 1952) is a Spanish retired footballer who played as a defender.

During a 13-year professional career he played in more than 300 competitive matches for Athletic Bilbao, winning one La Liga championship.

== Club career ==
Born in Eibar, Gipuzkoa, Guisasola made his senior debut with local SD Eibar at the age of 17, going on to play one-and-a-half seasons in Tercera División there. In late January 1971 he was bought by Basque giants Athletic Bilbao, making his official debut on the 31st in a 2–0 La Liga home win over RC Celta de Vigo, with his team eventually finishing fifth and qualifying for the UEFA Cup.

Midway through the 1971–72 campaign, manager Ronnie Allen was fired, but Guisasola was by now an essential defensive unit for Athletic. During his spell with the club he started as a full back, moved to central defender, was also deployed as a defensive midfielder and finished again in the defensive wings; in two consecutive seasons under Milorad Pavić he scored ten league goals combined, with Bilbao also winning the 1973 edition of the Copa del Rey.

In 1975–76, Guisasola played very little under coach Rafael Iriondo, who also tried to reconvert him in to forward. He regained his importance after the latter's departure, helping the side to two finals in 1977 (both lost, the UEFA Cup against Juventus FC and the domestic cup against Real Betis) and being named by L'Équipe Europe's best stopper.

During the better part of his career, Guisasola struggled with weight problems, and his production was highly inconsistent in his final years. An injury to starter José Ramón Alexanko – later of FC Barcelona fame – propelled him to the starting XI once again, and he helped Athletic finish seventh in the 1979–80 season; as they won the league in 1983, under Javier Clemente, he only contributed with four appearances (151 minutes).

Guisasola retired in May 1983 at almost 31, having appeared in 334 official matches for Athletic Bilbao, with neighbouring Real Sociedad being invited to his testimonial match. Subsequently, he lost all connection to the football world.

== International career ==
On 26 March 1980, Guisasola played his first and only game with the Spain national team, starting in a 0–2 friendly loss to England at the Camp Nou.

== Honours ==
Athletic Bilbao

- La Liga: 1982–83
- Copa del Generalísimo: 1972–73; Runner-up 1976–77
- UEFA Cup: Runner-up 1976–77
