= Carlos Meléndez (footballer, born 1957) =

Spanish footballer

Personal information
- Full name: Carlos Meléndez Latorre
- Date of birth: 26 January 1957 (age 69)
- Place of birth: Bilbao, Spain
- Height: 1.82 m (5 ft 11 1/2 in)
- Position: Goalkeeper

Youth career
- Zugazarte
- 1975–1976: Arenas Club

Senior career*
Years	Team	Apps	(Gls)
1976–1977	Arenas Club	37	(0)
1977–1978	Basconia	38	(0)
1978–1980	Bilbao Athletic	37	(0)
1979–1986	Athletic Bilbao	6	(0)
1986–1992	Espanyol	12	(0)
Total		130	(0)
- * Club domestic league appearances and goals

Carlos Meléndez Latorre (born 26 January 1957) is a Spanish former footballer who played as a goalkeeper. After making over 100 lower-division appearances in his early career, he spent a decade as a squad member with La Liga clubs Athletic Bilbao and RCD Espanyol but was rarely selected, instead becoming known as a dependable backup to the regular starters who missed very few matches; he was easily recognisable in his habitual place on the substitutes' bench due to his large moustache.

== Career ==
Raised in Getxo, Meléndez began his career locally at Arenas Club, where his coach at youth level was Javier Clemente. He quickly moved on to CD Basconia (signed by Clemente) then to Athletic Bilbao, where he became one of several contenders for the goalkeeping position held for many years by veteran José Ángel Iribar; initially the older Peio Agirreoa was ahead of Meléndez in the 'queue' to start, then the younger Andoni Cedrún spent the majority of the 1980–81 season as the regular after Meléndez failed to convince in a short spell.

Clemente, who had also joined Athletic and moved up through the youths and reserves, became head coach in 1981 and immediately installed Andoni Zubizarreta as the starter ahead of both Cedrún and Meléndez – Zubi would barely miss a match in the next five years (and would go on to become the all-time appearance record holder in Spanish football) as Athletic won two La Liga titles and a Copa del Rey, Meléndez remaining on the sidelines as a trusted alternative which proved not to be needed. Clemente was dismissed by Athletic in January 1986 and was appointed by RCD Espanyol five months later, quickly moving to sign Meléndez who was now unwanted in Bilbao even though Zubizarreta had also departed.

Any chances Meléndez had of replacing the Espanyol incumbent Thomas N'Kono diminished when he contracted hepatitis causing him to miss his first preseason with his new teammates, and he had to settle for a backup role again. His most notable appearances came during the Pericos' run to the 1988 UEFA Cup final when N'Kono was injured, and in the 1989–90 Segunda División promotion play-off (after their relegation in the previous campaign which had seen Clemente sacked) in which he saved a penalty in the shootout victory over CD Málaga. However, though N'Kono left the club, Vicente Biurrun was brought in (also from Athletic Bilbao) and Meléndez had another two years as a substitute before retiring.

He later had roles as a goalkeeping coach and scout at Athletic Bilbao.

== Honours ==
Athletic Bilbao

- La Liga: 1982–83, 1983–84
- Copa del Rey: 1983–84; runner-up 1984–85

Espanyol

- UEFA Cup: Runner-up 1987–88
