= José Núñez (footballer) =

Spanish footballer

Personal information
- Full name: José María Núñez Urrezola
- Date of birth: 22 January 1952 (age 74)
- Place of birth: Tolosa, Spain
- Height: 1.72 m (5 ft 8 in)
- Position: Left-back

Senior career*
Years	Team	Apps	(Gls)
1971–1973	Bilbao Athletic	52	(1)
1973–1986	Athletic Bilbao	177	(2)
1976–1978	→ Sporting Gijón (loan)	51	(0)
1986–1988	Sestao	67	(0)
Total		347	(3)

Managerial career
- 1988–1990: Amorebieta
- * Club domestic league appearances and goals

José María Núñez Urrezola (born 22 January 1952) is a Spanish former professional footballer who played as a left-back.

He amassed La Liga totals of 197 games and two goals over the course of 11 seasons, ten with Athletic Bilbao.

== Career ==
Born in Tolosa, Gipuzkoa, Núñez was a youth product of Athletic Bilbao, and made his senior debut with the reserve team in 1971. He was promoted to the main squad two years later, but only appeared in five La Liga matches in his first three seasons, his debut in the competition coming on 7 September 1974 in a 2–0 away loss against Málaga.

After two years with Sporting de Gijón on loan, the first spent in Segunda División, Núñez returned to his previous club in the summer of 1978, going on to be regularly played during his eight-year tenure in his second spell. From 1982 to 1984, as the Lions won back-to-back national championships, he contributed a total of 50 appearances, also playing the full 90 minutes in the final of the 1984 Copa del Rey which was won at the expense of Barcelona (1–0).

After spending the 1986–87 and 1987–88 campaigns in the second tier with Sestao, Núñez retired at the age of 36. Immediately afterwards, he was named manager of Amorebieta.

== Honours ==
Athletic Bilbao

- La Liga: 1982–83, 1983–84
- Copa del Rey: 1983–84; runner-up 1984–85
- Supercopa de España: 1984 (Athletic Bilbao were awarded the trophy as winners of the double)

Sporting Gijón

- Segunda División: 1976–77
