= Juan José Elgezabal =

Spanish footballer

Personal information
- Full name: Juan José Elgezabal Bustinza
- Date of birth: 21 December 1963 (age 62)
- Place of birth: Bakio, Spain
- Height: 1.73 m (5 ft 8 in)
- Position: Midfielder

Youth career
- –1982: Athletic Bilbao

Senior career*
Years	Team	Apps	(Gls)
1980–1981	Mungia	8	(2)
1982–1986	Bilbao Athletic	97	(13)
1982–1989	Athletic Bilbao	48	(3)
1989–1992	Logroñés	53	(1)
1992–1994	Español	26	(0)
1994–1995	Gernika	18	(1)
Total		250	(20)

International career
1983	Spain U-21	2	(0)
- * Club domestic league appearances and goals

Juan José Elgezabal Bustinza (born 21 December 1963) is a Spanish former professional footballer who played as a midfielder. He played in La Liga for Athletic Bilbao, Logroñés and Español, making a total of 123 top flight appearances.

== Club career ==
Born in Bakio, Biscay, Basque Country, Elgezabal started his career in the youth teams of Athletic Bilbao. He played for CD Mungia in the Tercera División during the 1980–81 season, before stepping into senior football with Athletic in 1982.

In 1982–83, Elgezabal was a key part of the Bilbao Athletic (Athletic's B team) side that won the Segunda División B title, and also made three appearances for the first team as they achieved the same success in La Liga. Until 1986, Elgezabal continued to appear for both the first and second teams, and again played a small part as Athletic lifted a second consecutive La Liga trophy in 1983–84 and the 1983–84 Copa del Rey.

From 1986 onwards, Elgezabal was solely part of Javier Clemente's first team, but never established himself as a first choice starter. He left Bilbao in 1989, having made only 71 first team appearances in all competitions over seven seasons. He joined fellow top flight side Logroñés, where he played for three seasons before moving on again to join manager Novoa at Español in 1992. He was a key part of the Español side that suffered relegation from La Liga in 1992–93, and also helped them secure promotion at the first attempt as Segunda División champions the following year.

Elgezabal left the club following this success, playing for one final season with Gernika in Segunda División B, at the end of which they were relegated. Elgezabal retired in 1995 at the age of 31.

== International career ==
Elgezabal made two appearances for the Spain under-21 side during 1983. His debut came on 5 October 1983, in a 2–2 friendly draw with Italy in Tarragona. On 15 November, he also played the final 20 minutes of a 1–0 win in a 1984 UEFA European Under-21 Championship qualifying match against the Netherlands at La Rosaleda, coming on as a substitute in place of Roberto Marina.

== Honours ==
Bilbao Athletic

- Segunda División B: 1982–83

Athletic Bilbao

- La Liga: 1982–83, 1983–84
- Copa del Rey: 1983–84
- Supercopa de España: 1984

Español

- Segunda División: 1993–94
