= Estanislao Argote =

Spanish footballer

Personal information
- Full name: Estanislao Argote Salaberría
- Date of birth: 21 October 1956 (age 70)
- Place of birth: Zarautz, Spain
- Height: 1.80 m (5 ft 11 in)
- Position: Winger

Youth career
- Zarautz
- 1974–1975: Athletic Bilbao

Senior career*
Years	Team	Apps	(Gls)
1975–1977	Bilbao Athletic	59	(21)
1977–1990	Athletic Bilbao	332	(63)
1990–1991	Zarautz		
Total		391	(84)

International career
1980	Spain amateur	1	(0)
1980–1981	Spain B	3	(0)
1978	Spain	2	(0)
- * Club domestic league appearances and goals

Estanislao Argote Salaberría (born 21 October 1956) is a Spanish retired footballer who played as a left winger.

== Club career ==
Born in Zarautz, Gipuzkoa, Argote began playing football with local Zarautz KE, joining Basque neighbours Athletic Bilbao in 1975. He spent almost two full seasons with the reserve side, making his first-team debut on 2 October 1977 by playing the full 1–0 home win against Atlético Madrid, shortly before his 21st birthday.

In his first season Argote scored 11 La Liga goals in 28 games, helping to a final third place. He went on to form an efficient offensive trio with Dani and Manuel Sarabia, also groomed at the club; as Athletic won back-to-back leagues in 1983–84 he appeared in 65 matches combined, netting ten times.

From 1984 onwards, Argote appeared intermittently for Athletic due to injuries. Late into the 1986–87 campaign, he suffered a leg injury which put him out of action for several months; at the time of his injury the team stood fourth in the table, but eventually finished in 13th position.

After 332 first division games for Athletic, in 13 years, Argote rejoined his first football club Zarautz, in the fourth division for the first time in its history. He retired after one year, aged nearly 35.

== International career ==
Argote played twice for Spain, both matches occurring in December 1978: on the 13th, he started in the 5–0 win against Cyprus for the UEFA Euro 1980 qualifying stages, in Salamanca. A week later, he played the first half of a 0–1 friendly loss with Italy, in Rome.

== Personal life ==
Argote was an accomplished accordion player. Indeed, shortly after winning the 1982–83 national championship, he recorded an album which met relative success in the Basque Country.

Argote also enjoyed playing golf, a sport at that time not very common among footballers. In his childhood, he was a caddie at the golf course in his hometown.

== Honours ==
- La Liga: 1982–83, 1983–84
- Copa del Rey: 1983–84
- Supercopa de España: 1984
