= Lobo Carrasco =

Spanish footballer (born 1959)

Personal information
- Full name: Francisco José Carrasco Hidalgo
- Date of birth: 6 March 1959 (age 67)
- Place of birth: Alcoy, Spain
- Height: 1.83 m (6 ft 0 in)
- Position: Winger

Youth career
- Lleida
- PB Tarragona
- Torredembarra
- Barcelona

Senior career*
Years	Team	Apps	(Gls)
1978	Barcelona B	14	(3)
1978	→ Terrassa (loan)	6	(1)
1978–1989	Barcelona	262	(49)
1989–1992	Sochaux	71	(2)
1992	Figueres	5	(0)
Total		358	(55)

International career
1977	Spain U18	2	(1)
1978	Spain U21	2	(0)
1979	Spain U23	5	(1)
1979–1983	Spain amateur	7	(1)
1979–1988	Spain	35	(5)

Managerial career
- 2005–2006: Málaga B
- 2007–2008: Oviedo
Medal record
Representing Spain
UEFA European Championship
Runner-up	1984 France
- * Club domestic league appearances and goals

Francisco José Carrasco Hidalgo (born 6 March 1959) is a Spanish former football player and manager.

Nicknamed Lobo, he played as a winger and spent most of his 14-year professional career with Barcelona (11 seasons). He won ten major titles with the club, including the 1984–85 La Liga and three Cup Winners' Cups.

A Spain international for nine years, Carrasco represented the country at the 1986 World Cup and two European Championships.

== Club career ==
Born in Alcoy, Alicante, Valencian Community, Carrasco was a product of the FC Barcelona youth system, and quickly made a name for himself in La Liga and Europe, with a brilliant display of creative dribbling. Having made his debut with the first team during 1978–79, he also shone in that season's UEFA Cup Winners' Cup final, a 4–3 thriller extra time win against Germany's Fortuna Düsseldorf.

After 376 competitive appearances for the Blaugrana, winning the 1984–85 league title, Carrasco spent three seasons with Ligue 1 club FC Sochaux-Montbéliard. He retired following a short stint with UE Figueres, in a return to Catalonia.

Subsequently, Carrasco became a manager: he finished 2005–06 at Atlético Malagueño, with the Andalusia team eventually being relegated from Segunda División. In the 2007–08 campaign, he coached lowly Real Oviedo.

== International career ==
Having first appeared for Spain in a friendly with Romania on 4 April 1979 (2–2 away draw), Carrasco went on to collect 35 caps with five goals, being selected for UEFA Euro 1980 and 1984 (where he played all five matches for the runners-up, scoring from the penalty kick spot against Romania in another tie, 1–1).

Carrasco was also picked for the squad that appeared in the 1986 FIFA World Cup in Mexico, but did not leave the bench for the eventual quarter-finalists.

== Career statistics ==
#	Date	Venue	Opponent	Score	Result	Competition
1.	15 May 1983	Ta' Qali, Attard, Malta	Malta	2–2	2–3	Euro 1984 qualifying
2.	14 June 1984	Geoffroy-Guichard, Saint-Étienne, France	Romania	0–1	1–1	UEFA Euro 1984
3.	17 October 1984	Benito Villamarín, Seville, Spain	Wales	2–0	3–0	1986 World Cup qualification
4.	1 April 1987	Prater, Vienna, Austria	Austria	2–3	2–3	Euro 1988 qualifying
5.	23 September 1987	Nou Castalia, Castellón, Spain	Luxembourg	1–0	2–0	Friendly

== Honours ==
Barcelona

- La Liga: 1984–85
- Copa del Rey: 1980–81, 1982–83, 1987–88
- Supercopa de España: 1983
- Copa de la Liga: 1983
- UEFA Cup Winners' Cup: 1978–79, 1981–82, 1988–89
- European Cup runner-up: 1985–86

Spain

- UEFA European Championship runner-up: 1984

Records

- Most UEFA Cup Winners' Cup titles: (3) (1978–79, 1981–82, 1988–89)
