= Miguel Sola =

Spanish footballer and manager

Personal information
- Full name: Miguel Ángel Sola Elizalde
- Date of birth: 29 September 1957 (age 69)
- Place of birth: Pamplona, Spain
- Height: 1.67 m (5 ft 6 in)
- Position: Midfielder

Youth career
- Txantrea
- 1975–1976: Athletic Bilbao

Senior career*
| Years | Team | Apps | (Gls) |
| 1976–1980 | Bilbao Athletic | 96 | (28) |
| 1978–1979 | → Arosa (loan) | | |
| 1980 | → Alavés (loan) | 7 | (0) |
| 1980–1985 | Athletic Bilbao | 125 | (15) |
| 1985–1992 | Osasuna | 191 | (27) |
| Total | | 419 | (70) |

Managerial career
- 1997: Osasuna
- 2001: Peña Sport
- 2002–2004: Real Unión
- 2005–2006: Huesca
- 2006–2008: Mirandés
- 2010–2011: Izarra
- 2011: Real Unión
- 2013–2014: Corellano
- 2017–2020: Calahorra
- 2023: Txantrea
- * Club domestic league appearances and goals

Miguel Ángel Sola Elizalde (born 29 September 1957) is a Spanish football manager and former player who played as a midfielder.

He amassed La Liga totals of 316 matches and 42 goals over 12 seasons, in representation of Athletic Bilbao and Osasuna.

In 1997, Sola started working as a coach.

== Playing career ==
Born in Pamplona, Navarre, Sola joined Athletic Bilbao's youth system in 1975, spending his first seasons as a senior with Bilbao Athletic and on loan, the latter including a five-month spell with Basque neighbours Alavés. In 1980, he returned as a full member of the main squad, going on to be an important unit during five years and totalling 57 La Liga games (nine goals) as the team won back-to-back national championships.

Sola was an unused substitute in the 1984 Copa del Rey final, which Athletic won by beating Barcelona 1–0. An on-field brawl involving players from both teams ensued at the conclusion of the match; during the melee, the tracksuited Sola was knocked to the turf by Diego Maradona, who then followed up by launching a jumping scissor knee at his jaw, rendering him unconscious.

After leaving the San Mamés Stadium with official totals of 177 matches and 24 goals, Sola moved to his hometown with Osasuna, appearing and scoring regularly for them in six of his seven seasons. In 1990–91, already aged 33, he made 26 appearances as the club finished in a best-ever fourth position, with the subsequent qualification for the UEFA Cup. He retired from the game at the end of the following campaign.

== Coaching career ==
In 1997, with Osasuna in the Segunda División, Sola managed the team for eight matches, collecting five losses and only one win as they barely avoided relegation. In the following years, always in the lower leagues, he coached Peña Sport, Real Unión, Huesca and Mirandés.

On 24 March 2010, Sola returned to his native region and signed with Izarra, aiming to help the club avoid relegation from the Segunda División B, which eventually did not happen. The next season, in the same tier, he was again in charge of Real Unión after replacing the fired Álvaro Cervera.

Sola was appointed at Calahorra of the Tercera División in June 2017. He won promotion at the end of his first season as champions, but was dismissed on 17 February 2020 due to poor results.

== Managerial statistics ==
As of 16 February 2020

Managerial record by team and tenure
| Team | Nat | From | To | Record | | | | | | | | Ref |
| Team | Nat | From | To | G | W | D | L | GF | GA | GD | Win % | Ref |
|---|---|---|---|---|---|---|---|---|---|---|---|---|
| Osasuna | (Spain) | 3 March 1997 | 5 May 1997 | 8 | 1 | 2 | 5 | 5 | 13 | −8 | 12.50 | |
| Peña Sport | (Spain) | 26 January 2001 | 30 June 2001 | 16 | 4 | 7 | 5 | 20 | 21 | −1 | 25.00 | |
| Real Unión | (Spain) | 1 July 2002 | 30 June 2004 | 91 | 42 | 20 | 29 | 127 | 93 | +34 | 46.15 | |
| Huesca | (Spain) | 1 July 2005 | 30 June 2006 | 40 | 10 | 14 | 16 | 31 | 44 | −13 | 25.00 | |
| Mirandés | (Spain) | 1 July 2006 | 30 June 2008 | 85 | 57 | 24 | 4 | 157 | 55 | +102 | 67.06 | |
| Izarra | (Spain) | 24 March 2010 | 2 January 2011 | 27 | 12 | 6 | 9 | 39 | 29 | +10 | 44.44 | |
| Real Unión | (Spain) | 2 January 2011 | 15 June 2011 | 21 | 11 | 4 | 6 | 30 | 22 | +8 | 52.38 | |
| Corellano | (Spain) | 19 September 2013 | 1 December 2014 | 49 | 13 | 9 | 27 | 50 | 75 | −25 | 26.53 | |
| Calahorra | (Spain) | 28 June 2017 | 17 February 2020 | 111 | 57 | 30 | 24 | 213 | 102 | +111 | 51.35 | |
| Total | | | | 448 | 207 | 116 | 125 | 672 | 454 | +218 | 46.21 | — |

== Honours ==
=== Player ===
Athletic Bilbao

- La Liga: 1982–83, 1983–84
- Copa del Rey: 1983–84
- Supercopa de España: 1984

=== Manager ===
Mirandés

- Tercera División: 2006–07, 2007–08
