= Fernando Tirapu =

Spanish footballer (1951–2018)

Personal information
- Full name: Fernando Tirapu Arteta
- Date of birth: 7 November 1951
- Place of birth: Pamplona, Spain
- Date of death: 28 July 2018 (aged 66)
- Place of death: Pamplona, Spain
- Height: 1.68 m (5 ft 6 in)
- Positions: Defender; midfielder

Youth career
- Oberena

Senior career*
Years	Team	Apps	(Gls)
1970–1974	Osasuna	75	(3)
1974–1977	Valencia	99	(0)
1977–1983	Athletic Bilbao	151	(3)
1983–1985	Osasuna	32	(0)
Total		357	(6)

International career
1979–1980	Basque Country	2	(0)
- * Club domestic league appearances and goals

Fernando Tirapu Arteta (7 November 1951 – 28 July 2018) was a Spanish footballer who played as a defender or midfielder.

He featured professionally for Osasuna, Valencia and Athletic Bilbao, making a total of 282 appearances in La Liga.

== Club career ==
A native of Pamplona, Navarre, Tirapu began his career in his hometown at CD Oberena, from where he was signed by CA Osasuna in 1970, aged 19. At that time the latter club competed in Tercera División, but it was promoted at the end of his second season; by now a regular at the El Sadar Stadium, he made his debut in the professional leagues on 3 September 1972 in a 0–1 home defeat to Racing de Santander, under manager Moruca. He scored his first goal a few weeks later against Pontevedra CF (2–1 away win), as his team went on to be relegated from Segunda División in 1974.

However, rather than moving down a level, Tirapu moved up when he joined La Liga side Valencia CF that summer. His first game in the competition took place on 7 September 1974, in a 1–2 home loss to Real Madrid. In his first year, he made a major contribution in nullifying the attacking threat of Johan Cruijff as Los Che battled to a 1–0 victory over FC Barcelona. After playing regularly for three seasons at the Mestalla Stadium, during which the side did not challenge for major honours, he transferred to Athletic Bilbao in 1977 for a fee of around 23 million pesetas.

Tirapu was part of 'Operation Return' where Athletic sought to bring Basque players based around Spain 'home' to play for them. He made his debut under Koldo Aguirre in the opening game of the 1977–78 campaign, a 0–0 draw at Real Betis on 4 September 1977. Later that month he appeared in his first European match, against Servette FC in the first round of the UEFA Cup. He played 204 competitive matches during his stint in Bilbao, contributing only one to the 1982–83 league conquest.

In 1983, Tirapu followed a route taken by several players when he moved back to Osasuna (who by now had returned to the top flight). Two years later, he finished his career at the age of 34.

== International career ==
Tirapu never earned any caps for Spain, but he did feature for the unofficial Basque Country regional team.

== Personal life and death ==
Tirapu's younger brother, Mariano, was also a footballer. A goalkeeper, he also played for Osasuna among other clubs. Both were related to Ainhoa Tirapu, goalkeeper for Athletic Bilbao's women's team and the daughter of their cousin.

Tirapu died on 28 July 2018 at the age of 66, in his hometown of Pamplona.

== Honours ==
Athletic Bilbao

- La Liga: 1982–83
