= Trofeo Ciudad de Alicante =

Friendly football tournament played annually since 1984

The Trofeo Ciudad de Alicante (ENG:Alicante City Trophy) is a friendly football tournament played annually since 1984, with the exception of the years 1997, 1999 and 2003–2009. It's held in Alicante, Valencian Community, Spain by Hércules CF.

== History of winners ==
Year	Winner	Score	Runner up
1984	(Spain) Hércules CF	2–0	(Uruguay) CA Peñarol
1985	(Chile) Universidad Católica	0–0 (p)	(Spain) Hércules CF
1986	(Brazil) Cruzeiro	4–1	(Spain) Hércules CF
1987	(Spain) FC Barcelona	6–0	(Spain) Hércules CF
1988	(Spain) Hércules CF	1–1 (p)	(Germany) Bayer Leverkusen
1989	(Spain) Rayo Vallecano	1–1 (p)	(Spain) Hércules CF
1990	(Spain) Real Madrid CF	4–0	(Spain) Hércules CF
1991	(Spain) Real Madrid CF	2–0	(Spain) Hércules CF
1992	(Spain) Real Madrid CF	3–1	(Spain) Hércules CF
1993	(Spain) Real Madrid CF	6–2	(Spain) Hércules CF
1994	(Spain) Valencia CF	1–1 (p)	(Spain) Hércules CF
1995	(Spain) Real Madrid CF	2–1	(Mexico) Atlético Celaya
1996	(Spain) Atlético Madrid	3–3 (p)	(Spain) Hércules CF
1997	Not Held		
1998	(Spain) Real Madrid CF	2–1	(Spain) Hércules CF
1999	Not Held		
2000	(Spain) Real Madrid CF	1–1 (p)	(Italy) SSC Napoli
2001	(Spain) Real Madrid CF	1–0	(France) Montpellier HSC
2002	(Spain) Real Madrid CF	5–2	(Romania) Dinamo Bucuresti
2010	(Spain) Real Madrid CF	3–1	(Spain) Hércules CF
2011	(Spain) Hércules CF	3–1	(Spain) Rayo Vallecano
2012	Not Held		
2013	(Spain) Elche CF	1–1 (p)	(Spain) Hércules CF
2014	(Spain) Hércules CF	1–0	(Spain) Albacete Balompié
2015	(Spain) Hércules CF	1–0	(Spain) CD Eldense
2016	(Spain) Hércules CF	1–0	(Spain) Levante UD
2017	(Spain) Hércules CF	2–1	(Spain) Rayo Vallecano
2018	(Spain) Hércules CF	2–1	(Spain) Real Murcia
2019	(Spain) Hércules CF	0–0 (p)	(Spain) UCAM Murcia CF

== Titles by club ==
Team	Titles
(Spain) Real Madrid CF	10
(Spain) Hércules CF	8
(Spain) Atlético de Madrid	1
(Spain) FC Barcelona	1
(Chile) Universidad Católica	1
(Brazil) Cruzeiro	1
(Spain) Rayo Vallecano	1
(Spain) Valencia CF	1
(Spain) Elche CF	1
