= José Ramón Alexanko =

Spanish footballer

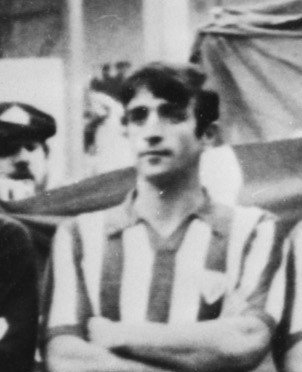
- Alexanko in 1977

Personal information
- Full name: José Ramón Alexanko Ventosa
- Date of birth: 19 May 1956 (age 70)
- Place of birth: Barakaldo, Spain
- Height: 1.82 m (6 ft 0 in)
- Position: Centre-back

Youth career
- Llodio
- Athletic Bilbao

Senior career*
Years	Team	Apps	(Gls)
1973–1976	Bilbao Athletic	97	(9)
1976–1980	Athletic Bilbao	91	(8)
1976	→ Alavés (loan)	5	(0)
1980–1993	Barcelona	274	(26)
Total		440	(43)

International career
1977	Spain U21	2	(0)
1978–1982	Spain	34	(4)
1979	Basque Country	1	(0)

Managerial career
- 1997–1998: FC U Craiova
- 1998–1999: Naţional București
- 2000–2002: Barcelona (assistant)
- * Club domestic league appearances and goals

José Ramón Alexanko Ventosa (Spanish pronunciation: [xo'se ra'mon aleɣ'saŋko βen'tosa]; born 19 May 1956), also known as Alexanko or Alesanco, is a Spanish retired football player and manager, who later served as director of football of Valencia.

During his career the central defender played with success for both Athletic Bilbao and Barcelona, winning several accolades for the latter – 16 in total – and appearing in 367 La Liga games over the course of 17 seasons (34 goals).

A Spanish international on more than 30 occasions, Alexanko represented the nation in one World Cup and one European Championship.

== Club career ==
=== Athletic Bilbao ===
Born in Barakaldo, Biscay, Alexanko joined Athletic Bilbao's youth system in 1972, then served an unassuming loan with Basque neighbours Alavés – second division – and returned subsequently. He made his La Liga debut on 12 December 1976, in a 5–2 home win against Espanyol (30 minutes played).

An undisputed starter from his second season onwards, Alexanko's highlights at Athletic were winning two runners-up medals, one in the Copa del Rey and one in the UEFA Cup, both in 1977. Among his teammates were veterans José Ángel Iribar and Javier Irureta.

=== Barcelona ===
In 1980, Alexanko signed for Barcelona, paving the way for a number of fellow Basque players including José Mari Bakero, Txiki Begiristain, Jon Andoni Goikoetxea, Julio Salinas and Andoni Zubizarreta. With him as captain they formed the backbone of the legendary Dream Team, which won four consecutive league championships and the European Cup for the first time in the club's history.

Among his most memorable moments during his 13 seasons at the Catalan side, Alexanko scored the winning goal as Barcelona beat Real Sociedad 1–0 in the 1988 domestic cup final, also playing about ten minutes in the 1992 European Cup Final. Six years earlier he had his penalty shootout attempt saved by Steaua București's Helmut Duckadam, as Barça lost the 1986 edition in Seville.

== International career ==
Alexanko made his debut for Spain on 15 November 1978, playing in the 1–0 home win against Romania for the UEFA Euro 1980 qualifiers. He represented the nation at both Euro 1980 and the 1982 FIFA World Cup, retiring from the international scene at only 26 after the second group stage draw against England in the latter competition, with a total of 34 caps; he also appeared in one game for the Euskadi XI, in 1979.

== Managerial career ==
After retiring as a player in 1993, Alexanko started a coaching career as he managed Romanian sides Universitatea Craiova and Naţional București. In the middle of 2000, he returned to Barcelona, assisting head coach Carles Rexach (his teammate in the forward's last season as a player). In July 2005, Alexanko was named the club's youth system coordinator.

In August 2015, Alexanko held the position of director of the Valencia Academy. On 7 January 2017, he became the interim director of football at Valencia in place of Jesús García Pitarch. In February, he was appointed permanently with a contract until 2019, with Vicente Rodríguez as technical secretary. Later that year, in September, he was fired from his position at Valencia.

In January 2018, he became a commentator for beIN Sports until the end of the 2017–18 La Liga season.

In September 2019, Alexanko was appointed academy and scouting director at South African club Mamelodi Sundowns. In November 2020, he left his position at Sundowns following the departure of coach Pitso Mosimane.

In March 2021, he returned to his position as youth football director at Barcelona, after Joan Laporta's victory in the presidential elections.

== Controversy ==
Alexanko was accused of raping a maid in a hotel at Papendal, the Netherlands, in 1988. Eventually, all of the charges were dropped.

== Honours ==
=== Player ===
Athletic Bilbao

- Copa del Rey runner-up: 1976–77
- UEFA Cup runner-up: 1976–77

Barcelona

- La Liga: 1984–85, 1990–91, 1991–92, 1992–93
- Copa del Rey: 1980–81, 1982–83, 1987–88, 1989–90
- Copa de la Liga: 1982–83, 1985–86
- Supercopa de España: 1983, 1991, 1992
- European Cup: 1991–92
- UEFA Cup Winners' Cup: 1981–82, 1988–89
- UEFA Super Cup: 1992

=== Manager ===
Universitatea Craiova

- Cupa României runner-up: 1997–98
