= Patxi Salinas =

Spanish footballer (born 1963)

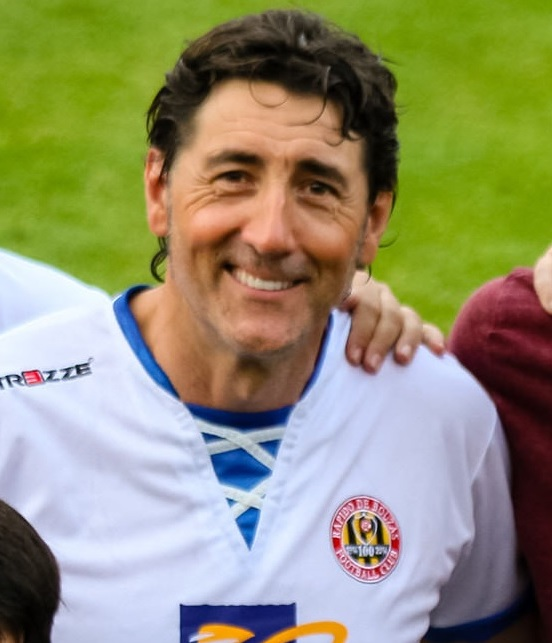

Personal information
- Full name: Francisco Salinas Fernández
- Date of birth: 17 November 1963 (age 62)
- Place of birth: Bilbao, Spain
- Height: 1.88 m (6 ft 2 in)
- Position: Centre-back

Youth career
- 1980–1981: Athletic Bilbao

Senior career*
Years	Team	Apps	(Gls)
1981–1984	Bilbao Athletic	69	(6)
1982–1992	Athletic Bilbao	239	(7)
1992–1998	Celta	193	(4)
Total		501	(17)

International career
1981–1982	Spain U18	6	(0)
1984–1986	Spain U21	12	(0)
1987–1988	Spain U23	3	(0)
1984	Spain amateur	1	(0)
1988	Spain	2	(0)
1995	Basque Country	1	(0)

Managerial career
- 1999–2000: Celta (youth)
- 2000–2001: Basque Country (beach soccer)
- 2001–2004: Porriño
- 2005: Gramenet
- 2009–2010: Athletic Bilbao (youth)
- 2011: Ourense
- 2012–2013: Melita
- 2013–2014: Sant Andreu
- 2016–2017: Rápido Bouzas
- 2017–2018: Burgos
- 2018: Badajoz
- 2019–2021: Basconia
- 2021–2022: Bilbao Athletic
- 2022: Portugalete
- * Club domestic league appearances and goals

Francisco 'Patxi' Salinas Fernández (born 17 November 1963) is a Spanish former footballer who played as a central defender, currently a manager.

He amassed La Liga totals of 432 games and 11 goals over 16 seasons, with Athletic Bilbao and Celta, winning two national championships with the former club. Subsequently, he worked as a manager.

== Club career ==
Born in Bilbao, Salinas emerged through Athletic Bilbao's youth ranks, and made his league debut on 10 November 1982, playing the full 90 minutes in a 1–0 away win against Salamanca. He appeared in 14 La Liga matches in the 1983–84 season as the team managed to conquer the double. In the following campaign, he became a regular fixture with the Basques alongside fellow Lezama youth graduate Genar Andrinúa.

In summer 1992, Salinas joined Celta de Vigo, where he proceeded to post equally impressive numbers in his six-season spell – always in the top division – retiring from the game at almost 35.

== International career ==
Over a one-month span, Salinas earned two caps for Spain, both in friendlies. His debut was on 14 September 1988 in a 2–1 loss to Yugoslavia, in Oviedo.

== Coaching career ==
After retiring as a player, Salinas had brief stints as coach of Celta's youth teams and Gramenet, also working with Rápido de Bouzas in directorial capacities. As a manager, in quick succession, he was in charge of Athletic's youth teams, Ourense, Melita (Maltese Premier League) and Sant Andreu.

Salinas achieved promotion to Segunda División B with Rápido in June 2017. One month later, after announcing weeks before he would leave the Galician side, he agreed terms with Burgos. He was dismissed on 5 February 2018, leaving them in ninth position and having conceded the fewest goals in the division.

On 22 May 2018, Salinas was appointed manager of Badajoz. In June of the following year, he signed in the same capacity with Basconia, Athletic Bilbao's farm team; his former teammate Rafael Alkorta was now director of football at the parent club. In December 2021, he moved up to become coach of the reserves following the sacking of Imanol de la Sota.

== Personal life ==
Salinas' older brother, Julio, was also a professional footballer (centre-forward), and played most notably for Athletic Bilbao and Barcelona. Both made their top-flight debut in the 1982–83 season.

They held the record for combined appearances in La Liga by siblings at the time of their retirement with 849 matches – occasions where they both played as teammates or opponents counted for each – 86 more than the next pair, Quini and Jesús Castro.

== Managerial statistics ==
As of match played 4 December 2022

Managerial record by team and tenure
Team	Nat	From	To	Record					Ref.
Team	Nat	From	To	G	W	D	L	Win %	Ref.
Porriño	(Spain)	1 July 2001	30 June 2004	114	44	32	38	38.60	
Gramenet	(Spain)	18 March 2005	17 June 2005	13	4	6	3	30.77	
Ourense	(Spain)	22 June 2011	10 December 2011	18	12	3	3	66.67	
Melita	(Malta)	8 November 2012	2 June 2013	23	3	7	13	13.04	
Sant Andreu	(Spain)	2 June 2013	11 February 2014	29	8	9	12	27.59	
Rápido Bouzas	(Spain)	30 June 2016	6 July 2017	44	24	14	6	54.55	
Burgos	(Spain)	10 July 2017	5 February 2018	28	10	12	6	35.71	
Badajoz	(Spain)	22 May 2018	24 October 2018	9	2	3	4	22.22	
Basconia	(Spain)	13 June 2019	14 December 2021	73	29	25	19	39.73	
Bilbao Athletic	(Spain)	14 December 2021	7 June 2022	22	9	5	8	40.91	
Portugalete	(Spain)	16 June 2022	5 December 2022	12	5	2	5	41.67	
Career Total				385	150	118	117	38.96	—

== Honours ==
Athletic Bilbao

- La Liga: 1982–83, 1983–84
- Copa del Rey: 1983–84; runner-up: 1984–85
- Supercopa de España: 1984

Celta

- Copa del Rey runner-up: 1993–94

Spain Under-21

- UEFA Under-21 European Championship runner-up: 1984

== See also ==
- List of Athletic Bilbao players (+200 appearances)
- List of La Liga players (400+ appearances)
