= Juan Carlos Rojo =

Spanish footballer and manager

Personal information
- Full name: Juan Carlos Pérez Rojo
- Date of birth: 17 November 1959 (age 66)
- Place of birth: Barcelona, Spain
- Height: 1.74 m (5 ft 9 in)
- Position: Forward

Youth career
- Barcelona

Senior career*
Years	Team	Apps	(Gls)
1978–1983	Barcelona B	132	(27)
1983–1987	Barcelona	63	(4)
1987	Barcelona B	7	(0)
1988–1989	Betis	0	(0)
1989–1990	Palamós	19	(0)
Total		221	(31)

International career
1977	Spain U18	3	(0)
1979	Spain U20	3	(0)
1984	Spain U21	3	(0)
1985	Spain	4	(0)

Managerial career
- 1997–2000: Barcelona (youth)
- 2003–2005: Barcelona (youth)
- 2005–2007: Barcelona C
- 2007–2008: Terrassa
- 2009: Santboià
- * Club domestic league appearances and goals

Juan Carlos Pérez Rojo (born 17 November 1959) is a Spanish former football forward and manager.

== Club career ==
Born in Barcelona, Catalonia, Rojo played five years in the first team of local club FC Barcelona, although he only had one solid season (1984–85, playing 29 games and scoring two goals en route to a La Liga title). After suffering a severe knee injury in 1986, he never recovered fully.

Rojo spent nearly two years without making one single appearance, the latter already at Andalusia's Real Betis which would be also relegated from the top flight. He finally retired in 1990 at only 30, following an unassuming spell at Barça neighbours Palamós CF in the Segunda División.

In the 2007–08 campaign, after several years in charge of Barcelona's youth sides, Rojo had his first head coaching experience, working with Terrassa FC in the Segunda División B and being dismissed in April 2008 after a 0–2 home loss against Ontinyent CF.

== International career ==
Rojo earned four caps for Spain, the first coming on 23 January 1985 in a 3–1 friendly win over Finland, in Alicante. Additionally, he participated with the under-20s at the 1979 FIFA World Youth Championship.

== Honours ==
Barcelona

- La Liga: 1984–85
- Supercopa de España: 1983
- UEFA Champions League runner-up: 1985–86

Spain Under-21

- UEFA Under-21 European Championship runner-up: 1984
