= Dani (footballer, born 1951) =

Spanish footballer

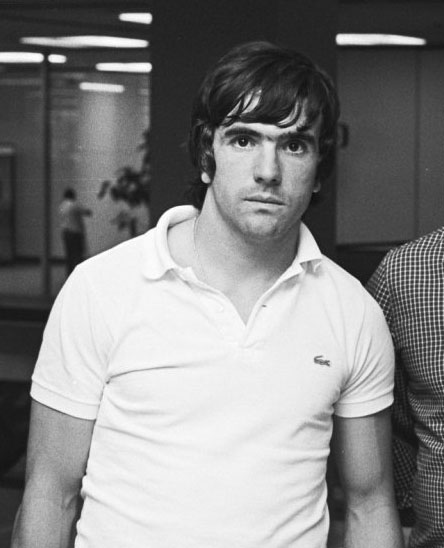
- Dani in 1978

Personal information
- Full name: Daniel Ruiz-Bazán Justa
- Date of birth: 28 June 1951 (age 75)
- Place of birth: Sopuerta, Spain
- Height: 1.69 m (5 ft 7 in)
- Position: Striker

Youth career
- 1968–1969: Sodupe
- 1969–1970: Getxo
- 1970–1971: Villosa

Senior career*
| Years | Team | Apps | (Gls) |
| 1971–1972 | Bilbao Athletic | 33 | (8) |
| 1972–1986 | Athletic Bilbao | 302 | (147) |
| 1972–1974 | → Barakaldo (loan) | 65 | (9) |
| Total | | 400 | (164) |

International career
| 1977 | Spain U21 | 1 | (3) |
| 1976 | Spain amateur | 1 | (1) |
| 1981 | Spain B | 2 | (1) |
| 1977–1981 | Spain | 25 | (10) |
- * Club domestic league appearances and goals

Daniel Ruiz-Bazán Justa (born 28 June 1951), commonly known as Dani, is a Spanish former professional footballer who played as a striker.

During his career, he played almost exclusively for Athletic Bilbao, scoring 199 competitive goals in more than one decade with the first team.

== Club career ==
Born in Sopuerta, Biscay, Dani played youth football with various clubs in the Basque Country. He signed for Athletic Bilbao in 1971 at the age of 20, spending one season with the reserve side in the Tercera División.

After two years on loan at neighbouring Barakaldo CF of Segunda División, Dani returned to his alma mater, scoring in double digits in nine of the following ten years. His first La Liga match occurred on 29 September 1974 in a 3–0 away loss against Valencia CF and, in the 1976–77 season, as the Lions reached the final of the UEFA Cup and the Copa del Rey, also finishing third in the league, he totalled 29 goals in 46 official games; in the latter competition, over a 12-year stint at the San Mamés Stadium, he reached the 20-goal mark twice.

Dani helped Athletic to back-to-back titles in his later years (1983–84), although he was only a fringe player in the latter campaign – ten matches, three goals – due to the emergence of another youth product of the club, Manuel Sarabia. He would be further pushed down the pecking order after the first-team promotion of Julio Salinas, and eventually retired in June 1986 at the age of 35, having scored 147 league goals from 302 appearances.

Dani's total of 11 goals in European competition stood as a club record for 25 years, until passed by Fernando Llorente in 2012. He was a penalty kick specialist.

== International career ==
Dani earned 25 caps for Spain in four years, scoring ten goals. His debut came on 21 September 1977 in a 2–1 friendly win in Switzerland.

Dani represented his country at both the 1978 FIFA World Cup and UEFA Euro 1980, respectively scoring against Austria and England (2–1 defeats and group-stage exit in both cases).

=== International goals ===
Scores and results list Spain's goal tally first, score column indicates score after each Dani goal.

List of international goals scored by Dani
| No. | Date | Venue | Opponent | Score | Result | Competition |
|---|---|---|---|---|---|---|
| 1 | 25 January 1978 | Santiago Bernabéu, Madrid, Spain | Italy | 2–0 | 2–1 | Friendly |
| 2 | 29 March 1978 | El Molinón, Gijón, Spain | Norway | 3–0 | 3–0 | Friendly |
| 3 | 26 April 1978 | Los Cármenes, Granada, Spain | Mexico | 2–0 | 2–0 | Friendly |
| 4 | 3 June 1978 | José Amalfitani, Buenos Aires, Argentina | Austria | 1–1 | 1–2 | 1978 FIFA World Cup |
| 5 | 4 April 1979 | Stadionul Central, Craiova, Romania | Romania | 1–1 | 2–2 | Euro 1980 qualifying |
| 6 | 4 April 1979 | Stadionul Central, Craiova, Romania | Romania | 2–2 | 2–2 | Euro 1980 qualifying |
| 7 | 26 September 1979 | Balaídos, Vigo, Spain | Portugal | 1–0 | 1–1 | Friendly |
| 8 | 23 January 1980 | Balaídos, Vigo, Spain | Netherlands | 1–0 | 1–0 | Friendly |
| 9 | 18 June 1980 | San Paolo, Naples, Italy | England | 1–1 | 1–2 | UEFA Euro 1980 |
| 10 | 12 November 1980 | Sarrià, Barcelona, Spain | Poland | 1–1 | 1–2 | Friendly |

== Honours ==
Athletic Bilbao

- La Liga: 1982–83, 1983–84
- Copa del Rey: 1983–84
- Supercopa de España: 1984
- UEFA Cup runner-up: 1976–77
