= José Ramón Gallego =

Spanish footballer (born 1959)

Personal information
- Full name: José Ramón Gallego Souto
- Date of birth: 7 August 1959 (age 67)
- Place of birth: Durango, Spain
- Height: 1.76 m (5 ft 9 in)
- Position: Midfielder

Senior career*
Years	Team	Apps	(Gls)
1978–1979	Durango		
1979–1980	Bilbao Athletic	30	(1)
1980–1991	Athletic Bilbao	259	(14)
1980–1981	→ Córdoba (loan)	36	(0)
1991–1992	Alavés	23	(1)
Total		348	(16)

International career
1986	Spain U21	1	(0)
- * Club domestic league appearances and goals

José Ramón Gallego Souto (born 7 August 1959) is a Spanish former professional footballer who played as a midfielder.

He all but spent his 14-year career with Athletic Bilbao, taking part in 11 La Liga seasons with the club with competitive totals of 331 matches and 18 goals.

== Club career ==
Born in Durango, Biscay, Gallego started playing in 1978 with local amateurs SCD Durango. One year later, he joined Basque giants Athletic Bilbao, initially being assigned to the reserves in the Segunda División B.

Gallego made his La Liga debut on 30 March 1980, coming on as a second-half substitute in a 0–0 away draw against RCD Español; he appeared in a further six league games during the season. After a loan to third-tier Córdoba CF, he returned to the San Mamés Stadium and went on to be a first-team regular over the following eight years.

Gallego contributed a total of 57 matches and two goals as his main club won back-to-back national championships (including the double in 1983–84). He ended his career in 1992 at the age of 32, with neighbouring Deportivo Alavés in the third division.

== Honours ==
Athletic Bilbao

- La Liga: 1982–83, 1983–84
- Copa del Rey: 1983–84
- Supercopa de España: 1984

Spain U21

- UEFA European Under-21 Championship: 1986
