= Iñigo Liceranzu =

Spanish footballer and coach

Personal information
- Full name: Jesús Iñigo Liceranzu Otxoa
- Date of birth: 13 March 1959 (age 67)
- Place of birth: Bilbao, Spain
- Height: 1.83 m (6 ft 0 in)
- Position: Centre-back

Youth career
- Athletic Bilbao

Senior career*
Years	Team	Apps	(Gls)
1977–1981	Bilbao Athletic	109	(11)
1980–1981	→ Barakaldo (loan)	37	(1)
1981–1988	Athletic Bilbao	169	(17)
1988–1989	Elche	19	(0)
Total		334	(29)

International career
1976–1977	Spain U18	6	(0)
1985	Spain	1	(0)

Managerial career
- ?–?: Úbeda
- 1998–1999: Zalla
- 2000–2003: Lemona
- 2003–2005: Amurrio
- 2006–2008: Barakaldo
- 2010–2011: Zamora
- * Club domestic league appearances and goals

Jesús Iñigo Liceranzu Otxoa (13 March 1959) is a Spanish former professional football central defender and manager.

== Club career ==
Born in Bilbao, Biscay, Liceranzu was a product of local giants Athletic Bilbao. After three years with the reserves he made his professional debut with Basque neighbours Barakaldo CF, in the Segunda División.

Upon his return in summer 1981, Liceranzu eventually became an undisputed started for the club, partnering Andoni Goikoetxea as stopper and being dubbed Rocky due to his hard approach. In 1983–84, as Athletic renewed their domestic supremacy, he scored a career-best seven goals in 32 matches; on 29 April 1984, he found the net twice in a Basque Derby home win against Real Sociedad (his second meaning the final 2–1, and the club's 3000th goal in La Liga).

Liceranzu retired from football in 1989 at only 30, after one season with Elche CF also in the top tier. Towards the end of the following decade he became a coach, working mainly in his native region: Úbeda CF, Zalla UC, SD Lemona, Amurrio Club, Barakaldo and Zamora CF.

== International career ==
On 30 April 1985, Liceranzu earned his sole cap for Spain, playing the entire 1986 FIFA World Cup qualifier against Wales, a 3–0 loss in Wrexham.

== Honours ==
Athletic Bilbao

- La Liga: 1982–83, 1983–84
- Copa del Rey: 1983–84
- Supercopa de España: 1984 (Athletic Bilbao were awarded the trophy as winners of the double)
