= 1980–81 La Liga =

50th season of La Liga

Primera División
- Season: 1980–81
- Dates: 6 September 1980 – 26 April 1981
- Champions: Real Sociedad (1st title)
- Relegated: Murcia; Salamanca; Almería
- European Cup: Real Sociedad
- Cup Winners' Cup: Barcelona
- UEFA Cup: Real Madrid; Atlético Madrid; Valencia
- Matches: 306
- Goals: 829 (2.71 per match)
- Top goalscorer: Quini (20 goals)

The 1980–81 La Liga season was the 50th since its establishment. It began on 6 September 1980, and concluded on 26 April 1981.

Real Sociedad won a first-ever title.

== Teams and location ==
Location of teams in La Liga 1980–81
Canary Islands

Team	Home city	Stadium
Almería	Almería	Juan Rojas
Athletic Bilbao	Bilbao	San Mamés
Atlético Madrid	Madrid	Vicente Calderón
Barcelona	Barcelona	Nou Camp
Español	Barcelona	Sarriá
Hércules	Alicante	José Rico Pérez
Las Palmas	Las Palmas	Insular
Murcia	Murcia	La Condomina
Osasuna	Pamplona	El Sadar
Real Betis	Seville	Benito Villamarín
Real Madrid	Madrid	Santiago Bernabéu
Real Sociedad	San Sebastián	Atocha
Salamanca	Villares de la Reina	Helmántico
Sevilla	Seville	Ramón Sánchez Pizjuán
Sporting Gijón	Gijón	El Molinón
Valencia	Valencia	Luis Casanova
Valladolid	Valladolid	José Zorrilla
Zaragoza	Zaragoza	La Romareda

== League table ==
Pos	Team	Pld	W	D	L	GF	GA	GD	Pts	Qualification or relegation
1	Real Sociedad (C)	34	19	7	8	52	29	+23	45 (Note: Real Sociedad finished ahead of Real Madrid on head-to-head goal-difference: Real Madrid 1-0 Real Sociedad, Real Sociedad 3-1 Real Madrid.)	Qualification for the European Cup first round
2	Real Madrid	34	20	5	9	66	37	+29	45	Qualification for the UEFA Cup first round
3	Atlético Madrid	34	17	8	9	59	41	+18	42 (Note: Atlético Madrid finished ahead of Valencia on head-to-head points: Atlético Madrid 3-1 Valencia, Valencia 0-0 Atlético Madrid.)	Qualification for the UEFA Cup first round
4	Valencia	34	16	10	8	46	39	+7	42	Qualification for the UEFA Cup first round
5	Barcelona	34	18	5	11	66	41	+25	41	Qualification for the Cup Winners' Cup first round (Note: Barcelona qualified to the Cup Winners' Cup as winners of the Copa del Rey.)
6	Real Betis	34	17	6	11	55	38	+17	40	
7	Sporting Gijón	34	14	10	10	58	40	+18	38	
8	Sevilla	34	14	9	11	34	42	−8	37	
9	Athletic Bilbao	34	14	7	13	64	53	+11	35	
10	Español	34	14	6	14	37	42	−5	34	
11	Osasuna	34	12	8	14	35	46	−11	32	
12	Valladolid	34	9	13	12	40	46	−6	31	
13	Hércules	34	10	10	14	42	48	−6	30	
14	Zaragoza	34	9	11	14	31	44	−13	29	
15	Las Palmas	34	12	4	18	47	61	−14	28	
16	Murcia (R)	34	8	7	19	35	49	−14	23	Relegation to the Segunda División
17	Salamanca (R)	34	7	7	20	32	67	−35	21	Relegation to the Segunda División
18	Almería (R)	34	6	7	21	30	66	−36	19	Relegation to the Segunda División

Source: BDFútbol
Rules for classification: 1) Points; 2) Head-to-head results; 3) Goal difference; 4) Number of goals scored
(C) Champions; (R) Relegated

== Results table ==
Home \ Away	ALM	ATH	ATM	BAR	BET	ESP	HÉR	LPA	MUR	OSA	RMA	RSO	SAL	SEV	SPG	VAL	VLD	ZAR
AD Almería		1–1	2–1	2–5	0–2	2–0	0–3	0–1	0–0	1–1	1–2	3–2	3–2	0–0	1–1	1–0	1–1	3–1
Athletic Bilbao	5–1		3–1	4–1	2–0	1–2	5–3	1–3	3–0	1–1	1–1	0–2	6–1	3–0	1–1	4–0	4–1	0–1
Atlético Madrid	2–1	2–1		1–0	0–4	1–0	1–0	2–2	2–1	0–0	3–1	2–0	1–1	2–0	0–0	3–1	5–2	1–2
FC Barcelona	6–0	0–1	4–2		1–3	3–1	6–0	1–0	1–0	6–0	2–1	2–0	3–0	3–1	3–1	0–3	2–1	0–0
Betis	2–0	2–0	0–1	1–1		1–2	2–0	4–1	1–0	1–1	1–1	1–0	5–0	2–0	2–0	1–1	2–2	2–0
RCD Español	1–0	1–0	2–0	1–0	1–2		2–1	3–1	2–1	0–0	2–1	0–0	2–1	2–2	1–0	1–2	0–0	1–1
Hércules CF	1–0	1–2	1–2	0–1	0–1	2–0		2–3	1–0	0–0	1–2	2–0	3–2	5–1	1–1	1–1	1–1	1–1
UD Las Palmas	3–0	1–3	1–1	1–4	2–4	2–0	1–1		1–2	2–0	1–0	0–3	1–1	1–2	3–1	1–4	0–2	3–0
Murcia	2–1	5–4	0–2	1–2	2–0	1–1	2–2	1–2		1–0	1–1	0–2	1–1	0–0	2–1	0–2	0–0	0–1
Osasuna	2–1	2–0	0–0	1–0	1–2	1–0	1–2	1–0	3–1		1–2	0–3	1–1	2–1	3–0	2–0	2–0	1–0
Real Madrid	4–0	7–1	2–0	3–0	4–2	1–2	3–0	3–0	4–0	3–1		1–0	2–0	3–2	1–0	2–1	1–1	2–0
Real Sociedad	3–1	4–1	2–2	2–0	2–2	2–1	1–1	2–0	1–0	2–1	3–1		1–0	3–0	1–2	2–1	1–0	1–0
UD Salamanca	2–1	3–2	1–1	2–1	2–0	3–2	0–1	0–2	0–3	1–2	1–3	0–2		0–0	2–2	0–1	2–1	3–1
Sevilla FC	1–0	2–0	1–1	1–1	2–1	2–0	0–0	3–2	1–0	1–0	2–0	0–0	1–0		3–2	1–0	1–0	0–0
Sporting de Gijón	5–2	1–1	3–0	2–1	2–0	0–1	3–1	2–1	2–0	5–1	4–0	2–2	4–0	3–0		0–0	4–1	1–1
Valencia CF	3–1	0–0	1–1	3–3	3–1	3–1	0–2	3–1	3–2	4–1	2–1	3–2	3–0	2–0	3–1		2–2	3–0
Valladolid	0–0	0–0	0–2	1–1	2–1	3–1	2–1	3–1	1–0	2–1	1–3	0–0	3–0	2–3	1–2	2–0		1–1
Zaragoza	1–0	2–3	0–1	1–2	2–0	2–1	1–1	2–3	1–6	3–1	0–0	0–1	2–0	2–0	0–0	1–1	1–1	

Legend: Blue = home team win; Yellow = draw; Red = away team win.

== Pichichi Trophy ==
Rank	Player	Club	Goals
1	(Spain) Quini	Barcelona	20
2	(Spain) Juanito	Real Madrid	19
3	(Spain) Dani	Athletic Bilbao	17
4	(Spain) Enrique Morán	Real Betis	16
4	(Spain) Jesús María Satrústegui	Real Sociedad	16

La Liga 1980–81 Winners
Real Sociedad
1st Title
