= Manuel Sarabia =

Spanish footballer and manager

Manu Sarabia
Personal information
- Full name: Manuel Sarabia López
- Date of birth: 9 January 1957 (age 69)
- Place of birth: Abanto Zierbena, Spain
- Height: 1.80 m (5 ft 11 in)
- Position: Striker

Youth career
- San Pedro Sestao
- 1974: Athletic Bilbao

Senior career*
Years	Team	Apps	(Gls)
1974–1976	Bilbao Athletic	52	(20)
1976–1988	Athletic Bilbao	284	(83)
1977–1978	→ Barakaldo (loan)	35	(14)
1988–1991	Logroñés	79	(18)
Total		450	(135)

International career
1978	Spain U21	2	(0)
1979–1983	Spain amateur	4	(1)
1983–1985	Spain	15	(2)

Managerial career
- 1995–1997: Bilbao Athletic
- 1999–2000: Badajoz
- 2002: Numancia
Medal record
Representing Spain
UEFA European Championship
Runner-up	1984 France
- * Club domestic league appearances and goals

Manuel 'Manu' Sarabia López (born 9 January 1957) is a Spanish former professional footballer who played as a striker.

He amassed La Liga totals of 363 games and 101 goals over the course of 14 seasons, mainly with Athletic Bilbao but also with Logroñés. He won four major titles with the former, notably two national championships, and scored 182 times in all competitions.

Left-footed, Sarabia represented Spain at Euro 1984.

== Club career ==
Born in Abanto y Ciérvana-Abanto Zierbena, Biscay, Sarabia came through the ranks of Lezama, Athletic Bilbao's prolific youth system, making his debut for the main squad on 19 September 1976 in a 1–1 home draw against CD Málaga. He was particularly determined to succeed at the club after his elder brother was rejected due to his birthplace in Torres, Jaén (despite spending most of his life in Biscay), as this did not fit the criteria for their signing policy at the time.

A full first-team member from 1978–79 onwards, having served a loan with neighbours Barakaldo CF the previous year, Sarabia went on to appear in 284 La Liga matches for the Basques with 83 goals. He had a best output of 16 in the 1982–83 season when Athletic won the league title, renewing it the following campaign); during his spell at the San Mamés Stadium, he was also involved in a spat with manager Javier Clemente.

Sarabia retired aged 34 in 1991, after three seasons with modest CD Logroñés also in the top tier. He took up coaching three years later, having brief stints in the Segunda División – the only season he started and finished, with Bilbao Athletic, ended in relegation.

== International career ==
Sarabia played 15 times with Spain in a two-year span, scoring twice. His first goal was one of 12 in the nation's rout of Malta in a UEFA Euro 1984 qualifier, in Seville.

Sarabia was selected for the tournament's finals in France, making three substitute appearances for the runners-up.

== Personal life ==
Sarabia's son, Eder, was also a footballer, albeit only in the amateur level, before becoming a coach with youth teams such as Danok Bat CF and serving as assistant to Quique Setién (former teammate of his father) at UD Las Palmas.

== Career statistics ==
Scores and results list Spain's goal tally first, score column indicates score after each Sarabia goal.

List of international goals scored by Manuel Sarabia
No.	Date	Venue	Opponent	Score	Result	Competition
1	21 December 1983	Benito Villamarín, Seville, Spain	Malta	11–1	12–1	Euro 1984 qualifying
2	12 June 1985	Laugardalsvöllur, Reykjavík, Iceland	Iceland	1–1	2–1	1986 World Cup qualification

== Honours ==
Athletic Bilbao

- La Liga: 1982–83, 1983–84
- Copa del Rey: 1983–84; runner-up 1976–77, 1984–85
- Supercopa de España: 1984 (automatically awarded after winning the double)
- UEFA Cup: runner-up 1976–77

Spain

- UEFA European Championship: runner-up 1984
