= 1984–85 La Liga =

54th season of La Liga

La Liga
- Dates: 1 September 1984 – 21 April 1985
- Champions: Barcelona; 10th title
- Relegated: Málaga; Elche; Murcia
- European Cup: Barcelona
- Cup Winners' Cup: Atlético Madrid
- UEFA Cup: Athletic Bilbao; Sporting Gijón; Real Madrid; Osasuna
- Matches: 306
- Goals: 662 (2.16 per match)
- Top goalscorer: Hugo Sánchez (19 goals)
- Biggest home win: Barcelona 6–0 Murcia
- Biggest away win: Real Madrid 0–4 Atlético Madrid; Real Sociedad 0–4 Atlético Madrid

The 1984–85 La Liga season was the 54th since its establishment. It began on 1 September 1984, and concluded on 21 April 1985. The champions were Barcelona, who won the title by a 10-point margin over second-placed Atlético Madrid in their first season under the management of English coach Terry Venables.

== Teams and locations ==
Location of teams in La Liga 1984–85

Team	Home city	Stadium
Athletic Bilbao	Bilbao	San Mamés
Atlético Madrid	Madrid	Vicente Calderón
Barcelona	Barcelona	Nou Camp
Elche	Elche	Manuel Martínez Valero
Español	Barcelona	Sarriá
Hércules	Alicante	José Rico Pérez
Málaga	Málaga	La Rosaleda
Murcia	Murcia	La Condomina
Osasuna	Pamplona	El Sadar
Racing Santander	Santander	El Sardinero
Real Betis	Seville	Benito Villamarín
Real Madrid	Madrid	Santiago Bernabéu
Real Sociedad	San Sebastián	Atocha
Sevilla	Seville	Ramón Sánchez Pizjuán
Sporting Gijón	Gijón	El Molinón
Valencia	Valencia	Luis Casanova
Valladolid	Valladolid	José Zorrilla
Zaragoza	Zaragoza	La Romareda

== League table ==
Pos	Team	Pld	W	D	L	GF	GA	GD	Pts	Qualification or relegation
1	Barcelona (C)	34	21	11	2	69	25	+44	53	Qualification for the European Cup first round
2	Atlético Madrid	34	16	11	7	51	28	+23	43	Qualification for the Cup Winners' Cup first round (Note: Atlético Madrid qualified for the European Cup Winners' Cup as winners of the Copa del Rey.)
3	Athletic Bilbao	34	13	15	6	39	26	+13	41	Qualification for the UEFA Cup first round
4	Sporting Gijón	34	13	15	6	34	23	+11	41	Qualification for the UEFA Cup first round
5	Real Madrid	34	13	10	11	46	36	+10	36	Qualification for the UEFA Cup first round
6	Osasuna	34	13	8	13	38	38	0	34	Qualification for the UEFA Cup first round
7	Real Sociedad	34	11	12	11	41	33	+8	34	
8	Español	34	11	12	11	40	44	−4	34	
9	Valencia	34	9	15	10	40	37	+3	33	
10	Zaragoza	34	11	11	12	39	39	0	33	
11	Racing Santander	34	10	12	12	27	34	−7	32	
12	Sevilla	34	10	11	13	29	41	−12	31	
13	Valladolid	34	7	16	11	39	45	−6	30	
14	Real Betis	34	11	8	15	37	43	−6	30	
15	Hércules	34	9	12	13	28	45	−17	30	
16	Málaga (R)	34	7	15	12	23	36	−13	29	Relegation to the Segunda División
17	Elche (R)	34	6	14	14	18	37	−19	26	Relegation to the Segunda División
18	Murcia (R)	34	6	10	18	24	52	−28	22	Relegation to the Segunda División

Source: BDFútbol
Rules for classification: 1) Points; 2) Head-to-head results; 3) Goal difference; 4) Number of goals scored
(C) Champions; (R) Relegated

== Results table ==
Home \ Away	ATH	ATM	BAR	BET	ELC	ESP	HÉR	MLG	MUR	OSA	RAC	RMA	RSO	SEV	SPG	VAL	VLD	ZAR
Athletic Bilbao		2–2	1–0	1–1	0–0	2–1	4–1	4–1	1–0	5–0	1–0	0–0	1–1	0–0	2–0	3–2	1–1	0–3
Atlético Madrid	0–0		1–2	2–0	1–0	2–2	1–0	3–0	2–1	3–0	2–1	0–1	2–1	1–1	0–0	2–3	2–0	0–1
FC Barcelona	0–0	2–2		4–0	4–0	1–0	2–0	1–0	6–0	2–0	2–0	3–2	1–1	3–1	2–0	1–1	4–2	4–0
Betis	0–2	0–1	1–2		2–0	3–1	1–0	0–1	0–2	3–1	1–2	4–1	0–0	1–2	1–2	1–3	1–1	2–0
Elche CF	1–0	1–0	0–0	2–1		0–3	2–0	1–1	0–0	0–0	2–0	0–1	1–1	0–0	0–0	0–1	1–1	0–0
RCD Español	1–0	0–0	0–0	0–1	1–0		2–2	0–0	1–0	1–0	5–0	2–0	1–3	1–0	2–2	3–2	2–2	3–2
Hércules CF	0–0	1–3	1–0	2–2	1–0	0–0		1–1	2–1	1–1	2–0	2–2	0–0	0–0	1–1	2–0	2–1	0–0
CD Málaga	0–1	1–0	1–2	1–1	0–0	1–1	1–1		0–0	2–1	2–0	1–1	1–3	0–1	0–0	0–0	3–1	2–0
Murcia	0–0	0–1	1–1	0–1	2–1	1–0	0–2	4–0		0–0	3–1	0–1	2–2	2–0	0–3	0–3	1–2	0–3
Osasuna	1–2	0–0	1–2	1–2	2–2	5–0	2–1	1–0	2–0		0–0	1–0	1–0	4–0	0–0	2–0	3–0	0–1
Racing de Santander	1–0	1–2	0–0	1–1	2–0	1–3	2–0	2–0	2–2	5–0		0–0	1–0	1–0	1–0	1–1	1–0	1–1
Real Madrid	2–2	0–4	0–3	3–2	6–1	4–1	0–1	0–0	5–0	1–0	3–0		1–1	1–2	0–0	1–0	2–0	1–2
Real Sociedad	1–2	0–4	0–0	0–1	2–0	2–0	4–0	0–1	4–0	0–2	0–0	0–3		5–1	0–0	4–1	0–0	2–1
Sevilla FC	3–0	2–4	2–2	1–0	1–1	0–0	2–0	2–0	0–0	1–2	0–0	1–0	0–1		0–1	0–0	0–2	2–1
Sporting de Gijón	1–1	2–1	2–2	1–1	2–0	1–0	4–0	2–0	1–0	1–0	0–0	1–1	1–0	2–0		1–1	1–3	0–2
Valencia CF	1–1	0–0	2–5	0–1	0–0	5–1	3–0	1–1	1–1	0–0	0–0	1–0	2–0	0–0	0–2		0–0	4–1
Valladolid	0–0	2–2	1–2	3–1	1–2	1–1	3–1	1–1	1–1	2–3	1–0	1–1	1–1	2–3	0–0	1–0		1–1
Zaragoza	1–0	1–1	2–4	0–0	1–0	1–1	0–1	0–0	3–0	1–2	0–0	0–2	1–2	4–1	2–0	2–2	1–1	

Legend: Blue = home team win; Yellow = draw; Red = away team win.

== Pichichi Trophy ==
Rank	Player	Club	Goals
1	(Mexico) Hugo Sánchez	Atlético Madrid	19
2	(Argentina) Jorge Valdano	Real Madrid	17
3	(Scotland) Steve Archibald	Barcelona	15
4	(Argentina) Mario Cabrera	Atlético Madrid	14
4	(France) (Spain) Michel Pineda	Español	14

La Liga 1984–85 winners
Barcelona
10th title
