= Spain national amateur football team =

Spanish football team

Spain amateur
- Association: Real Federación Española de Fútbol (RFEF)
- Confederation: UEFA (Europe)
First colours	Second colours

The Spain national amateur football team is the amateur representative team for Spain at football.

It was formed in 1950s to play Mediterranean Games, UEFA Amateur Cup and, until 1988, Summer Olympics football tournaments.

== Olympic record ==
Summer Olympics record
Year	Round	Position	Pld	W	D*	L	GF	GA
1920–1964	See Spain national football team							
(Mexico) 1968	Quarter-finals	5th	4	2	1	1	4	2
(West Germany) 1972	Did not qualify							
(Canada) 1976	Group stage	13th	2	0	0	2	1	3
(Soviet Union) 1980	Group stage	10th	3	0	3	0	2	2
(United States) 1984	Did not qualify							
(South Korea) 1988	Did not qualify							
Since 1992	See Spain national under-23 football team							
Total	Quarter-finals	3/6	9	2	4	3	7	7

== Mediterranean Games record ==
Mediterranean Games record
Year	Round	Position	Pld	W	D*	L	GF	GA
(Spain) 1955	Silver medalists	2nd	3	2	1	0	6	2
(Lebanon) 1959	Did not qualify							
(Italy) 1963	Bronze medalists	3rd	5	3	2	0	15	5
(Tunisia) 1967	Bronze medalists	3rd	5	2	2	1	7	5
Total	1 Silver medal	3/4	13	7	5	1	28	12
