= 1982–83 La Liga =

52nd season of La Liga

La Liga
- Dates: 4 September 1982 – 1 May 1983
- Champions: Athletic Bilbao; 7th title
- Relegated: Las Palmas; Celta Vigo; Racing Santander
- European Cup: Athletic Bilbao
- Cup Winners' Cup: Barcelona
- UEFA Cup: Real Madrid; Atlético Madrid; Sevilla
- Matches: 306
- Goals: 780 (2.55 per match)
- Top goalscorer: Poli Rincón (20 goals)

The 1982–83 La Liga season was the 52nd since its establishment. It began on 4 September 1982, and concluded on 1 May 1983. After the penultimate game of the season, Real Madrid led by 1 point but lost in the final game at Valencia. The result meant that Valencia avoided relegation on goal difference, while Real Madrid lost the title to Athletic Bilbao by 1 point.

== Teams and locations ==
Location of teams in La Liga 1982–83
Canary Islands

Team	Home city	Stadium
Athletic Bilbao	Bilbao	San Mamés
Atlético Madrid	Madrid	Vicente Calderón
Barcelona	Barcelona	Nou Camp
Celta	Vigo	Balaídos
Español	Barcelona	Sarriá
Las Palmas	Las Palmas	Insular
Málaga	Málaga	La Rosaleda
Osasuna	Pamplona	El Sadar
Racing Santander	Santander	El Sardinero
Real Betis	Seville	Benito Villamarín
Real Madrid	Madrid	Santiago Bernabéu
Real Sociedad	San Sebastián	Atocha
Salamanca	Villares de la Reina	Helmántico
Sevilla	Seville	Ramón Sánchez Pizjuán
Sporting Gijón	Gijón	El Molinón
Valencia	Valencia	Luis Casanova
Valladolid	Valladolid	José Zorrilla
Zaragoza	Zaragoza	La Romareda

== League table ==
Pos	Team	Pld	W	D	L	GF	GA	GD	Pts	Qualification or relegation
1	Athletic Bilbao (C)	34	22	6	6	71	36	+35	50	Qualification for the European Cup first round
2	Real Madrid	34	20	9	5	57	25	+32	49	Qualification for the UEFA Cup first round
3	Atlético Madrid	34	20	6	8	56	38	+18	46	Qualification for the UEFA Cup first round
4	Barcelona	34	17	10	7	60	29	+31	44	Qualification for the Cup Winners' Cup first round (Note: Barcelona qualified for the European Cup Winners' Cup by winning the Copa del Rey.)
5	Sevilla	34	15	12	7	44	31	+13	42	Qualification for the UEFA Cup first round
6	Zaragoza	34	17	6	11	59	39	+20	40	
7	Real Sociedad	34	12	12	10	29	27	+2	36	
8	Sporting Gijón	34	9	15	10	31	32	−1	33	
9	Español	34	13	6	15	45	47	−2	32	
10	Málaga	34	10	10	14	37	48	−11	30	
11	Real Betis	34	9	12	13	42	45	−3	30	
12	Valladolid	34	9	11	14	34	51	−17	29	
13	Salamanca	34	10	8	16	31	48	−17	28	
14	Osasuna	34	10	6	18	39	54	−15	26	
15	Valencia	34	9	7	18	42	56	−14	25	
16	Las Palmas (R)	34	7	11	16	32	55	−23	25	Relegation to the Segunda División
17	Celta Vigo (R)	34	9	6	19	27	56	−29	24	Relegation to the Segunda División
18	Racing Santander (R)	34	9	5	20	44	63	−19	23	Relegation to the Segunda División

Source: BDFútbol
Rules for classification: 1) Points; 2) Head-to-head results; 3) Goal difference; 4) Number of goals scored
(C) Champions; (R) Relegated

== Position by round ==
Team / Round	1	2	3	4	5	6	7	8	9	10	11	12	13	14	15	16	17	18	19	20	21	22	23	24	25	26	27	28	29	30	31	32	33	34
Athletic	7	3	2	1	5	2	5	4	5	4	3	3	2	4	2	2	2	2	2	2	2	2	3	3	3	2	1	1	2	1	2	2	2	1
Real Madrid	6	4	3	2	1	1	1	1	1	1	1	1	1	1	1	1	1	1	1	1	1	1	2	2	1	1	2	2	1	2	1	1	1	2
Atlético	3	2	1	3	2	8	8	8	8	6	7	8	8	8	6	6	7	7	7	5	5	6	6	5	5	6	5	5	4	4	4	4	4	3
Barcelona	14	6	9	8	7	6	4	6	3	3	4	4	3	2	3	4	3	3	3	3	3	3	1	1	2	3	3	3	3	3	3	3	3	4
Sevilla	5	12	11	12	8	7	6	3	4	7	8	5	6	5	5	5	5	5	5	6	6	5	4	6	6	4	6	6	6	6	6	6	5	5
Real Zaragoza	1	1	4	5	3	5	3	2	2	2	2	2	4	3	4	3	4	4	4	4	4	4	5	4	4	5	4	4	5	5	5	5	6	6
Real Sociedad	11	9	5	6	4	3	2	5	6	5	5	7	5	6	8	8	8	9	9	8	8	9	8	8	7	7	7	7	7	7	7	7	7	7
Sporting	10	8	8	4	6	4	7	7	7	8	6	6	7	7	7	7	6	6	6	7	7	7	7	7	8	8	8	8	8	8	8	8	8	8
RCD Español	4	11	14	15	14	15	12	12	9	9	9	9	9	9	9	9	9	8	8	9	9	8	9	9	9	9	9	9	9	9	10	9	10	9
CD Málaga	12	10	12	10	9	12	14	14	12	13	10	11	10	12	13	15	14	14	14	14	13	13	13	13	12	12	10	10	11	10	11	11	11	10
Betis	18	18	13	14	13	10	11	11	13	14	13	14	13	11	10	12	13	13	13	12	12	11	11	11	11	11	12	11	10	11	9	10	9	11
Real Valladolid	9	16	17	17	17	16	16	18	18	18	18	18	18	18	18	16	17	17	17	17	17	16	15	15	15	15	15	14	14	14	14	13	13	12
Salamanca	15	13	6	9	11	11	9	10	10	11	12	13	12	14	11	11	10	12	11	10	10	10	10	10	10	10	11	12	12	12	12	12	12	13
Osasuna	8	14	16	13	12	13	17	13	15	12	14	12	14	13	14	13	15	15	15	16	15	15	16	16	16	16	16	15	15	15	15	15	15	14
Valencia	2	7	10	11	16	14	15	16	17	15	16	15	17	15	17	18	18	18	18	18	18	18	18	17	17	17	17	17	17	16	18	16	17	15
Las Palmas	13	5	7	7	10	9	10	9	11	10	11	10	11	10	12	10	11	10	10	11	11	12	12	12	13	13	13	13	13	13	13	14	14	16
Celta	16	17	18	18	18	18	18	17	14	16	17	16	16	17	15	14	12	11	12	13	14	14	14	14	14	14	14	16	16	17	16	17	16	17
Racing	17	15	15	16	15	17	13	15	16	17	15	17	15	16	16	17	16	16	16	15	16	17	17	18	18	18	18	18	18	18	17	18	18	18

== Results table ==
Home \ Away	ATH	ATM	BAR	BET	CEL	ESP	LPA	MLG	OSA	RAC	RMA	RSO	SAL	SEV	SPG	VAL	VLD	ZAR
Athletic Bilbao		4–1	3–2	3–2	4–0	5–2	3–0	3–2	4–0	2–0	2–4	2–0	4–0	2–1	3–0	2–1	1–1	1–0
Atlético Madrid	0–0		1–1	0–0	5–2	1–0	1–0	3–0	2–1	3–1	0–0	2–0	1–0	1–1	2–1	2–1	2–1	2–0
FC Barcelona	0–1	2–1		1–1	2–2	1–0	7–2	2–1	3–0	0–2	2–1	1–0	3–0	1–0	1–1	1–0	3–0	1–1
Betis	5–1	1–3	1–1		0–1	1–0	3–1	1–1	4–2	2–1	1–1	1–1	1–1	1–2	1–0	2–0	1–1	2–2
Celta de Vigo	0–1	0–4	0–4	1–2		2–2	3–0	2–2	2–1	1–0	0–2	0–1	2–0	1–0	0–0	2–1	1–0	0–2
RCD Español	3–2	1–2	0–3	0–2	1–0		2–0	3–0	3–0	1–0	1–1	1–0	1–1	1–1	3–2	5–2	2–0	3–2
UD Las Palmas	1–5	1–2	2–1	1–0	2–2	0–0		1–2	2–1	2–1	0–3	2–0	4–1	1–1	1–1	1–1	2–2	1–0
CD Málaga	0–0	0–2	1–4	1–0	1–0	2–1	3–1		1–0	3–0	2–1	1–0	2–3	0–0	1–1	3–1	2–2	1–3
Osasuna	2–2	4–2	1–0	0–0	4–1	4–0	1–1	1–0		4–2	2–1	0–1	1–0	0–1	2–0	2–1	1–1	1–2
Racing de Santander	0–2	4–0	0–4	2–2	2–0	1–2	2–1	0–0	3–0		1–2	1–1	1–1	2–2	2–1	4–1	5–0	2–1
Real Madrid	2–0	3–1	0–2	1–0	3–0	2–2	1–0	1–0	2–1	5–1		4–0	1–0	1–0	1–0	5–1	2–0	1–0
Real Sociedad	1–1	1–0	1–0	2–0	1–0	0–2	1–1	2–0	2–0	2–0	0–0		4–1	0–0	0–0	2–0	2–1	0–0
UD Salamanca	0–1	1–2	1–1	2–1	1–0	1–0	1–1	2–1	2–0	3–0	0–0	0–0		2–3	0–2	1–0	1–0	2–0
Sevilla FC	2–1	1–1	0–0	2–0	1–0	2–1	2–0	2–2	1–0	2–0	2–2	2–1	0–0		1–0	3–1	3–0	1–2
Sporting de Gijón	1–1	2–3	0–0	2–2	0–0	1–0	1–0	3–0	2–1	2–1	1–1	0–0	1–0	1–1		1–1	0–0	2–1
Valencia CF	1–2	1–0	2–1	4–2	0–1	2–1	0–0	1–1	1–1	2–1	1–0	2–1	4–1	4–0	1–1		1–1	1–2
Valladolid	0–2	1–3	1–3	2–0	3–1	1–0	1–0	0–0	1–1	2–0	2–2	1–1	3–0	1–4	1–0	1–0		2–1
Zaragoza	2–1	2–1	2–2	2–0	4–0	3–1	0–0	2–1	4–0	7–2	0–1	1–1	3–2	1–0	0–1	3–2	4–1	

Legend: Blue = home team win; Yellow = draw; Red = away team win.

== Pichichi Trophy ==
Rank	Player	Club	Goals
1	(Spain) Poli Rincón	Real Betis	20
2	(Paraguay) Raúl Amarilla	Zaragoza	19
3	(Spain) Dani	Athletic Bilbao	18
4	(Argentina) Jorge Valdano	Zaragoza	17
5	(Spain) Manuel Sarabia	Athletic Bilbao	16
