= 1983–84 La Liga =

53rd season of La Liga

La Liga
- Dates: 3 September 1983 – 29 April 1984
- Champions: Athletic Bilbao; 8th title
- Relegated: Cádiz; Mallorca; Salamanca
- European Cup: Athletic Bilbao
- Cup Winners' Cup: Barcelona
- UEFA Cup: Real Madrid; Atlético Madrid; Real Betis; Valladolid
- Matches: 306
- Goals: 782 (2.56 per match)
- Top goalscorer: Jorge da Silva; Juanito (17 goals each)

The 1983–84 La Liga season was the 53rd since its establishment. It began on 3 September 1983, and concluded on 29 April 1984.

== Teams and locations ==
Location of teams in La Liga 1983–84

Team	Home city	Stadium
Athletic Bilbao	Bilbao	San Mamés
Atlético Madrid	Madrid	Vicente Calderón
Barcelona	Barcelona	Nou Camp
Cádiz	Cádiz	Ramón de Carranza
Español	Barcelona	Sarriá
Málaga	Málaga	La Rosaleda
Mallorca	Palma	Lluís Sitjar
Murcia	Murcia	La Condomina
Osasuna	Pamplona	El Sadar
Real Betis	Seville	Benito Villamarín
Real Madrid	Madrid	Santiago Bernabéu
Real Sociedad	San Sebastián	Atocha
Salamanca	Villares de la Reina	Helmántico
Sevilla	Seville	Ramón Sánchez Pizjuán
Sporting Gijón	Gijón	El Molinón
Valencia	Valencia	Luis Casanova
Valladolid	Valladolid	José Zorrilla
Zaragoza	Zaragoza	La Romareda

== League table ==
Pos	Team	Pld	W	D	L	GF	GA	GD	Pts	Qualification or relegation
1	Athletic Bilbao (C)	34	20	9	5	53	30	+23	49	Qualification for the European Cup first round
2	Real Madrid	34	22	5	7	59	37	+22	49	Qualification for the UEFA Cup first round (Note: Valladolid qualified for the UEFA Cup as winners of the Copa de la Liga.)
3	Barcelona	34	20	8	6	62	28	+34	48	Qualification for the Cup Winners' Cup first round (Note: Barcelona qualified for the European Cup Winners' Cup as runners-up of the Copa del Rey.)
4	Atlético Madrid	34	17	8	9	53	47	+6	42	Qualification for the UEFA Cup first round
5	Real Betis	34	17	4	13	45	40	+5	38	Qualification for the UEFA Cup first round
6	Real Sociedad	34	14	9	11	43	35	+8	37	
7	Zaragoza	34	12	11	11	50	41	+9	35	
8	Sevilla	34	13	8	13	42	43	−1	34	
9	Málaga	34	11	11	12	41	35	+6	33	
10	Español	34	10	13	11	42	44	−2	33	
11	Murcia	34	10	12	12	42	38	+4	32	
12	Valencia	34	12	8	14	45	47	−2	32	
13	Sporting Gijón	34	11	8	15	38	47	−9	30	
14	Valladolid	34	11	7	16	44	60	−16	29	Qualification for the UEFA Cup first round
15	Osasuna	34	11	6	17	30	44	−14	28	
16	Cádiz (R)	34	6	10	18	36	51	−15	22	Relegation to the Segunda División
17	Mallorca (R)	34	3	15	16	27	56	−29	21	Relegation to the Segunda División
18	Salamanca (R)	34	5	10	19	30	59	−29	20	Relegation to the Segunda División

Source: BDFútbol
Rules for classification: 1) Points; 2) Head-to-head results; 3) Goal difference; 4) Number of goals scored
(C) Champions; (R) Relegated

== Results table ==
Home \ Away	ATH	ATM	BAR	BET	CÁD	ESP	MLG	MALL	MUR	OSA	RMA	RSO	SAL	SEV	SPG	VAL	VLD	ZAR
Athletic Bilbao		2–2	1–2	2–0	3–1	1–1	2–1	4–0	4–1	1–0	2–1	2–1	6–3	5–0	1–0	2–0	1–0	1–0
Atlético Madrid	1–0		1–2	4–3	1–0	1–0	3–1	3–0	1–1	3–0	1–0	2–1	1–0	1–0	1–1	1–2	3–1	3–3
FC Barcelona	4–0	2–1		3–1	4–1	5–2	1–0	1–1	2–0	1–0	1–2	0–0	2–0	3–1	4–0	0–0	5–0	0–0
Betis	2–0	1–0	0–0		2–1	4–1	2–0	2–0	1–0	1–0	4–1	0–0	1–0	1–0	3–0	3–2	3–1	3–1
Cádiz CF	0–1	3–1	1–1	0–0		1–1	0–0	3–0	1–3	0–0	2–3	1–1	2–0	0–1	0–2	2–0	5–1	1–2
RCD Español	0–0	1–4	1–0	4–1	1–1		1–1	3–1	1–1	2–0	1–2	2–2	3–0	1–0	2–0	1–2	2–0	0–0
CD Málaga	0–0	5–1	0–1	1–1	1–1	2–1		2–0	1–0	1–2	6–2	2–2	2–1	1–0	3–1	2–1	3–1	0–1
RCD Mallorca	0–0	1–1	1–4	0–1	1–1	1–1	0–0		1–1	3–0	0–2	2–1	1–1	2–2	1–2	1–2	1–1	1–1
Murcia	0–1	0–0	0–0	1–0	3–1	2–0	2–1	4–1		4–0	0–1	3–1	1–0	1–1	2–1	3–3	1–2	0–0
Osasuna	1–1	1–2	4–2	1–0	2–0	0–0	0–0	4–0	1–0		1–1	0–3	0–0	3–0	1–0	2–0	3–0	1–4
Real Madrid	0–0	5–0	2–1	2–0	6–2	1–0	1–0	2–0	3–2	2–0		0–0	3–0	2–2	2–1	0–1	2–1	1–0
Real Sociedad	0–1	3–1	0–1	1–0	1–0	1–1	0–2	1–0	0–0	1–0	1–3		4–0	1–0	3–0	1–0	2–1	2–1
UD Salamanca	1–2	2–2	1–3	1–3	1–0	2–2	1–0	1–1	2–2	3–1	0–1	1–1		1–0	0–1	1–0	2–2	1–1
Sevilla FC	4–1	0–1	3–1	2–1	2–1	2–1	0–0	0–0	1–0	3–0	4–1	0–3	3–2		1–1	2–0	2–1	2–0
Sporting de Gijón	2–2	2–0	0–0	2–0	2–1	0–1	2–0	0–3	1–1	2–1	1–2	1–2	1–1	1–0		1–1	5–1	1–1
Valencia CF	1–2	1–2	2–4	3–1	1–1	4–0	1–1	2–2	1–1	2–0	0–0	2–1	1–0	2–0	0–3		3–2	1–3
Valladolid	0–0	1–2	2–1	1–0	2–0	0–0	2–2	2–0	2–1	0–1	0–2	4–1	3–1	3–3	2–0	2–1		2–1
Zaragoza	1–2	2–2	0–1	5–0	1–2	2–4	1–0	1–1	2–1	2–0	3–1	2–1	3–0	1–1	4–1	0–3	1–1	

Legend: Blue = home team win; Yellow = draw; Red = away team win.

== Pichichi Trophy ==
Rank	Player	Club	Goals
1	(Uruguay) Jorge da Silva	Valladolid	17
1	(Spain) Juanito	Real Madrid	17
3	(El Salvador) Mágico González	Cádiz	15
4	(Spain) Marcos Alonso	Barcelona	14
5	(Mexico) Hugo Sánchez	Atlético Madrid	12

La Liga 1983–84 winners

8th title
