= 1983–84 Atlético Madrid season =

43rd season in existence of Atlético Madrid

Atlético Madrid
1983–84 season
- President: Vicente Calderón
- Head coach: Luis Aragonés
- Stadium: Vicente Calderón Stadium
- La Liga: 4th (In UEFA Cup)
- Copa del Rey: Eightfinals
- UEFA Cup: 1st round
- Copa de la Liga: Runners-up
- Top goalscorer: League: Hugo Sánchez (12); All: Hugo Sánchez (18)
Home colours	Away colours	Third colours

The 1983–84 season was Atlético Madrid's 43rd season since foundation in 1903 and the club's 38th season in La Liga, the top league of Spanish football. Atlético competed in La Liga, and the Copa del Rey.

== Squad ==
Note: Flags indicate national team as defined under FIFA eligibility rules; some limited exceptions apply. Players may hold more than one non-FIFA nationality.

Pos.	Nation	Player
GK	ESP	Pereira
GK	ESP	Mejías
GK	ESP	Navarro
DF	ESP	Arteche
DF	FRG	Mirko Votava
DF	ESP	Balbino
DF	ESP	Juanjo
DF	ESP	Marcelino
DF	ESP	Ruiz
DF	ESP	Sierra
MF	ESP	Clemente
MF	ESP	Marián Díaz

Pos.	Nation	Player
MF	ESP	Marina
MF	ESP	Mínguez
FW	ESP	Pedro Pablo
FW	MEX	Hugo Sánchez
MF	ESP	Quique Ramos
MF	ESP	Román
FW	ARG	Cabrera
MF	ESP	Julio Prieto
MF	ESP	Landaburu
FW	ESP	Manolo Agujetas
FW	ESP	Pedraza

=== Transfers ===
In
Pos.	Name	from	Type
DF	Tomas Reñones		
MF	Victor Jose Porras Rodriguez		

Out
Pos.	Name	To	Type
MF	Jean-Francois Larios	Montreal Manic	

== Results ==
=== La Liga ===
==== League table ====
Pos	Team	Pld	W	D	L	GF	GA	GD	Pts	Qualification or relegation
2	Real Madrid	34	22	5	7	59	37	+22	49	Qualification for the UEFA Cup first round (Note: Valladolid qualified for the UEFA Cup as winners of the Copa de la Liga.)
3	Barcelona	34	20	8	6	62	28	+34	48	Qualification for the Cup Winners' Cup first round (Note: Barcelona qualified for the European Cup Winners' Cup as runners-up of the Copa del Rey.)
4	Atlético Madrid	34	17	8	9	53	47	+6	42	Qualification for the UEFA Cup first round
5	Real Betis	34	17	4	13	45	40	+5	38	Qualification for the UEFA Cup first round
6	Real Sociedad	34	14	9	11	43	35	+8	37	

Source: BDFútbol
Rules for classification: 1) Points; 2) Head-to-head results; 3) Goal difference; 4) Number of goals scored

==== Position by round ====
Round	1	2	3	4	5	6	7	8	9	10	11	12	13	14	15	16	17	18	19	20	21	22	23	24	25	26	27	28	29	30	31	32	33	34
Ground	H	A	H	A	H	A	H	A	H	A	H	A	H	A	H	A	H	A	H	A	H	A	H	A	H	A	H	A	H	A	H	A	H	A
Result	W	W	W	W	D	D	L	W	L	W	L	L	L	W	D	W	L	W	W	W	D	W	D	D	W	W	L	W	W	W	L	D	D	L
Position	1	2	2	1	1	1	3	1	3	1	6	7	10	6	8	5	8	7	4	3	4	4	4	4	3	3	4	4	4	4	4	4	4	4

Source: LFP
A = Away; H = Home; W = Win; D = Draw; L = Loss; = 1984–85 European Cup; = 1984–85 UEFA Cup

==== Matches ====
Win Draw Loss

2 September 1983 1	Espanol	1–4	Atlético Madrid	Barcelona
	Tintin Marquez 89'	Report	Quique Ramos 68'; Pedraza 77'; Quique Ramos 80'; Hugo Sánchez 84'	Stadium: Sarria; Referee: Joaquin Ramos Marcos

9 September 1983 2	Atlético Madrid	1–0	Sevilla FC	Madrid
	Pedraza 70'	Report		Stadium: Estadio Vicente Calderón; Referee: Enriquez Negrete

17 September 1983 3	CA Osasuna	1–2	Atlético Madrid	Pamplona
	Lumbreras 56'	Report	Cabrera 62'; Cabrera 73'	Stadium: Estadio El Sadar; Referee: Ildefonso Urizar Azpitarte

23 September 1983 4	Atlético Madrid	3–0	RCD Mallorca	Madrid
	Hugo Sánchez 59' (pen.); Hugo Sánchez 68'; Pedraza 86'	Report		Stadium: Estadio Vicente Calderón; Referee: Jose Benavente Garasa

1 October 1983 5	Athletic de Bilbao	2–2	Atlético Madrid	Bilbao
	Noriega 17'; Elgezabal 57'	Report	Rubio 59'; Quique Ramos 67'	Stadium: San Mamés; Referee: Jose Pes Perez

9 October 1983 6	Atlético Madrid	1–1	Real Murcia	Madrid
	Hugo Sánchez 58' (pen.); Marina (red card)	Report	Ramirez 4'	Stadium: Estadio Vicente Calderón; Referee: Juan Andújar Oliver

16 October 1983 7	Sporting Gijón	2–0	Atlético Madrid	Gijón
	Laurie Cunningham 18'; Laurie Cunningham 48'	Report		Stadium: Estadio El Molinon; Referee: Miguel Marín Lopez

23 October 1983 8	Atlético Madrid	3–1	Real Valladolid	Madrid
	Julio Prieto 29'; Cabrera 74'; Mirko Votava 84'	Report	Jorge Da Silva 5'	Stadium: Estadio Vicente Calderón; Referee: Jose Garcia Carrion

29 October 1983 9	Real Madrid	5–0	Atlético Madrid	Madrid
	John Metgod 33'; Juanito 36'; Santillana 48'; Uli Stielike 86'; Angel 89'	Report		Stadium: Estadio Santiago Bernabéu; Referee: Enriquez Negreira

5 November 1983 10	Atlético Madrid	4–3	Real Betis	Madrid
	Pedraza 17'; Mirko Votava 55'; Arteche 85'; Arteche 89'	Report	Paco Machin 26'; Rincon 32'; Parra 51'	Stadium: Estadio Vicente Calderón; Referee: Jose Merino Gonzalez

8 November 1983 11	CD Málaga	5–1	Atlético Madrid	Málaga
	Toto 30'; Fernando Rodriguez 41'; Toto 53'; Canillas 71'; Martin 73'	Report	Pedraza 55'	Referee: Teodoro Valdes Sanchez

19 November 1983 12	Atlético Madrid	1–2	Valencia CF	Madrid
	Hugo Sánchez 79'	Report	Saura 1'; Ribes 60' (pen.)	Stadium: Vicente Calderón Stadium; Referee: Victoriano Sanchez Arminio

26 November 1983 13	Real Sociedad	3–1	Atlético Madrid	San Sebastián
	Jose Mari Bakero 50'; Uralde 74'; Lopez Ufarte 86'	Report	Pedraza 83'	Stadium: Estadio Anoeta; Referee: Bartolome Jimenez Madrid

3 December 1983 14	Atlético Madrid	1–0	Cádiz CF	Madrid
	Hugo Sánchez 4' (yellow card) 81' (yellow-red card)	Report		Stadium: Vicente Calderón Stadium; Referee: Jaime Bayarri Rivelles

10 December 1983 15	Real Zaragoza	2–2	Atlético Madrid	Zaragoza
	Señor 72' (pen.); Corchado 81'	Report	Cabrera 45'; Mirko Votava 46'	Stadium: La Romareda; Referee: Sebastian Damin Rendon

13 December 1983 16	Atlético Madrid	1–0	UD Salamanca	Madrid
	Landaburu 29'	Report		Stadium: Vicente Calderón Stadium; Referee: Felipe Crespo Aurre

30 December 1983 17	FC Barcelona	2–1	Atlético Madrid	Barcelona
	Marcelino 8' (o.g.); Esteban Vigo 12'	Report	Pedraza 79'	Stadium: Camp Nou; Referee: Miguel Marín Lopez

7 January 1984 18	Atlético Madrid	1–0	RCD Español	Madrid
	Marina 1'	Report		Stadium: Estadio Vicente Calderón; Referee: Tomas Jimenez Moreno

14 January 1984 19	Sevilla FC	0–1	Atlético Madrid	Sevilla
		Report	Landaburu 61'	Stadium: Estadio Sanchez Pizjuan; Referee: Francesc Casajuana Rifà

21 January 1984 20	Atlético Madrid	3–0	CA Osasuna	Madrid
	Landaburu 13'; Hugo Sánchez 32'; Landaburu 42'	Report		Stadium: Estadio Vicente Calderón; Referee: Bartolome Jimenez

27 January 1984 21	RCD Mallorca	1–1	Atlético Madrid	Mallorca
	Gerry Armstrong 6'	Report	75' Arteche	Referee: Felipe Crespo Aurre

3 February 1984 22	Atlético Madrid	1–0	Athletic Bilbao	Madrid
	Hugo Sánchez 71'	Report		Stadium: Estadio Vicente Calderón; Referee: Garcia de Loza

3 February 1984 23	Real Murcia	0–0	Atlético Madrid	Murcia
		Report		Referee: Jose Merino Gonzalez

19 February 1984 24	Atlético Madrid	1–1	Sporting Gijón	Madrid
	Rubio 42'	Report	Mesa 53'	Stadium: Estadio Vicente Calderón; Referee: Teodoro Valdes Sanchez

25 February 1984 25	Real Valladolid	1–2	Atlético Madrid	Valladolid
	Patricio Yañez 46' (pen.)	Report	Marina 56'; Marina 80'	Stadium: Estadio Jose Zorrilla; Referee: Jose Pes Perez

4 March 1984 26	Atlético Madrid	1–0	Real Madrid	Madrid
	Hugo Sánchez 53' (pen.) (yellow card); Arteche (yellow card); Landaburu (yellow card)	Report	Juan José (yellow card)	Stadium: Estadio Vicente Calderón; Referee: Felipe Crespo Aurre

10 March 1984 27	Real Betis	1–0	Atlético Madrid	Sevilla
	Paco Machin 84'	Report		Stadium: Estadio Benito Villamarin; Referee: Jose Garcia Carrion

17 March 1984 28	Atlético Madrid	3–1	CD Málaga	Madrid
	Landaburu 18'; Mirko Votava 42'; Quique Ramos 46'	Report	Jose Hurtado 7'	Stadium: Vicente Calderón Stadium; Referee: Jose Socorro Gonzalez

23 March 1984 29	Valencia CF	1–2	Atlético Madrid	Valencia
	Fernando Gomez 82'	Report	Arteche 29'; Rubio 50'	Stadium: Estadio Mestalla; Referee: Antonio Martin Navarrete

30 March 1984 30	Atlético Madrid	2–1	Real Sociedad	Madrid
	Quique Ramos 30'; Hugo Sánchez 89'	Report	Jose Mari Bakero 52'	Stadium: Vicente Calderón Stadium; Referee: Jose Pes Perez

7 April 1984 31	Cádiz CF	3–1	Atlético Madrid	Cádiz
	Jorge Gonzalez 26'; Mejías 82'; Francis Cabral 89'	Report	Marina 49'	Referee: Joaquin Urio Velazquez

14 April 1984 32	Atlético Madrid	3–3	Real Zaragoza	Madrid
	Arteche 35'; Hugo Sánchez 55'; Landaburu 87'	Report	Raul Amarilla 46'; Corchado 65'; Herrera 80'	Stadium: Vicente Calderón Stadium; Referee: Garcia de Loza

21 April 1984 33	UD Salamanca	2–2	Atlético Madrid	Villares de la Reina
	Arrien 38'; Orejuela 48' (pen.)	Report	Hugo Sánchez 17'; Cabrera 70'	Stadium: Helmántico Stadium; Referee: Jose Garcia Carrion

28 April 1984 34	Atlético Madrid	1–2	FC Barcelona	Madrid
	Rubio 17'	Report	Rojo 7'; Carrasco 25'	Stadium: Vicente Calderón Stadium; Referee: Joaquin Ramos Marcos

=== Copa del Rey ===
==== Second round ====
12 October 1983	Tarancón	1-5	Atlético Madrid	Tarancón
	Casanova 62'	Report	5' Víctor; 26' (rig)Mínguez; 39', 58', 71' Manolo	Stadium: Municipal; Referee: Damir Rendón

18 October 1983	Atlético Madrid	5–0	Tarancón	Madrid
	Víctor 20', 28'; Mínguez 65'; Balbino 67'; Marián 72'	Report		Stadium: Vicente Calderón; Attendance: 5,000

==== Third round ====
2 November 1983	Portmany	2–2	Atlético Madrid	Sant Antoni de Portmany
	Emilio 83'; Javier 86' (rig)	Report	21', 47' Víctor	Stadium: Municipal; Attendance: 1,000; Referee: Jiménez Madrid

17 November 1983	Atlético Madrid	3–1	Portmany	Madrid
	Votava 57', 76'; Cabrera 83'	Report	8' Miguelín	Stadium: Vicente Calderón; Attendance: 4,000

==== Eightfinals ====
25 January 1984	Atlético Madrid	0–0	Osasuna	Madrid
		Report		Stadium: Vicente Calderón; Attendance: 15,000; Referee: Enríquez Negreira

8 February 1984	Osasuna	2–1	Atlético Madrid	Pamplona
	Martín 4'; Lumbreras 87'	Report	90' Landaburu	Stadium: El Sadar; Attendance: 15,000; Referee: Martín Navarrete

=== UEFA Cup ===
==== Round of 32 ====
14 September 1983	Atlético Madrid (Spain)	2–1	(Netherlands) Groningen	Madrid
21:00 CET	Marina 86'; Waalderbos 89' (o.g.)	Report	50' McDonald	Stadium: Vicente Calderón; Attendance: 40,000; Referee: (Italy) Menicucci

28 September 1983	Groningen (Netherlands)	3–0	(Spain) Atlético Madrid	Groningen
20:00 CET	Jans 12'; Koeman 48' van Dijk 83'	Report		Stadium: Euroborg; Referee: (Czech Republic) Christov

=== Copa de la Liga ===
==== First round ====
6 May 1984	Real Madrid	1–1	Atlético Madrid	Madrid
	Butragueño 32'	Report	90+1' Sánchez	Stadium: Santiago Bernabéu; Attendance: 40,000; Referee: Urizar Azpitarte

12 May 1984	Atlético Madrid	3–2	Real Madrid	Madrid
	Ruiz 45'; Quique 75', 89'	Report	42' Butragueño; 48' Ito	Stadium: Vicente Calderón; Attendance: 40,000; Referee: Urío Velázquez

==== Eightfinals ====
19 May 1984	Athletic Bilbao	1–3	Atlético Madrid	Bilbao
	Dani 85' (pen.)	= http://www.infoatleti.es/partido/19840519	61', 69' Quique; 79' J. Prieto	Stadium: San Mamés; Attendance: 20,000; Referee: García De Loza

27 May 1984	Atlético Madrid	3–2	Athletic Bilbao	Madrid
	Landaburu 56'; Sánchez 70', 89' (pen.)	Report	25' (rig) Dani; 65' J. Salinas	Stadium: Vicente Calderón; Attendance: 26,000; Referee: Martín Navarrete

==== Quarterfinals ====
3 June 1984	Español	0–2	Atlético Madrid	Barcelona
		Report	46' Marina; 89' Mínguez	Stadium: Sarriá; Referee: Damín Rendón

9 June 1984	Atlético Madrid	4–2	Español	Madrid
	Arteche 7', 13'; Sánchez 73'; Pedraza 86'	Report	61' Giménez; 75' Orejuela	Stadium: Vicente Calderón; Attendance: 40,000; Referee: Merino González

==== Semifinals ====
16 June 1984	FC Barcelona	1–2	Atlético Madrid	Barcelona
	P. Alonso 17'	Report	78', 84' (rig) Sánchez	Stadium: Camp Nou; Attendance: 20,000; Referee: Marín López

21 June 1984	Atlético Madrid	2–1	FC Barcelona	Madrid
	Marina 54', 90'	Report	Calderé 29'	Stadium: Vicente Calderón; Attendance: 30,000; Referee: Urío Velázquez

==== Final ====
26 June 1984	Atlético Madrid	0–0	Real Valladolid	Madrid
		Report		Stadium: Vicente Calderón; Attendance: 30,000; Referee: Urizar Azpitarte

30 June 1984	Real Valladolid	3–0 (a.e.t.)	Atlético Madrid	Valladolid
	Votava 98' (o.g.); Fortes 106'; Minguela 113'	Report		Stadium: José Zorrilla; Attendance: 30,000; Referee: Pes Pérez

== Statistics ==
=== Squad statistics ===
No.	Pos	Nat	Player	Total		Primera Division		Copa del Rey		UEFA		Copa de la Liga	
No.	Pos	Nat	Player	Apps	Goals	Apps	Goals	Apps	Goals	Apps	Goals	Apps	Goals
-	GK	(Spain) ESP	Pereira	32	-36	20	-21	2	-2	0	0	10	-13
-	DF	(West Germany) FRG	Votava	49	6	31+2	4	4	2	2	0	10	0
-	DF	(Spain) ESP	Ruiz	40	1	23+3	0	1+1	0	2	0	10	1
-	DF	(Spain) ESP	Arteche	39	7	26	5	3	0	2	0	8	2
-	DF	(Spain) ESP	Clemente	34	0	24+1	0	6	0	1	0	2	0
-	MF	(Spain) ESP	Julio Prieto	47	3	32+1	2	2+1	0	2	0	9	1
-	MF	(Spain) ESP	Quique Ramos	43	8	31+1	4	2	0	2	0	7	4
-	MF	(Spain) ESP	Landaburu	47	8	27+4	6	4	1	2	0	10	1
-	MF	(Spain) ESP	Marina	42	8	30	4	2+1	0	0+2	1	7	3
-	FW	(Spain) ESP	Rubio	40	4	25+3	4	2	0	1	0	8+1	0
-	FW	(Mexico) MEX	Hugo Sánchez	41	18	27	12	2	0	2	0	10	6
-	GK	(Spain) ESP	Mejias	16	-30	14	-26	0	0	2	-4		
-	FW	(Spain) ESP	Pedraza	39	8	21+7	7	3	0	1	0	2+5	1
-	DF	(Spain) ESP	Balbino	27	1	18	0	6	1	2	0	1	0
-	FW	(Argentina) ARG	Cabrera	23	5	7+9	5	1+1	0	0+2	0	1+2	0
-	DF	(Spain) ESP	Marcelino	11	0	6+1	0	4	0	0	0		
-	FW	(Spain) ESP	Minguez	36	3	5+19	0	3	2	0	0	3+6	1
-	MF	(Spain) ESP	Juanjo	9	0	5+1	0	0	0	0	0	3	0
-	FW	(Spain) ESP	Víctor	13	5	2+3	0	4+1	5	0	0	1+2	0
-	MF	(Spain) ESP	Manolo Agujetas	4	2	0	0	4	2	0	0		
-	FW	(Spain) ESP	Pedro Pablo	8	1	0+3	0	2+2	1	0	0	0+1	0
-	FW	(Spain) ESP	Luis Marián	4	1	0	0	3	1	1	0		
-	GK	(Spain) ESP	Abel Resino	4	-4	0	0	4	-4	0	0		
-	DF	(Spain) ESP	Tomas Reñones	11	0	0	0	2+1	0	0	0	8	0

- Source: https://www.bdfutbol.com/en/t/t1983-847.html
