= 1982–83 Atlético Madrid season =

42nd season in existence of Atlético Madrid

Atlético Madrid
1982–83 season
- President: Vicente Calderón
- Head coach: Luis Aragonés
- Stadium: Vicente Calderón Stadium
- La Liga: 3rd (in 1983–84 UEFA Cup)
- Copa del Rey: Third round
- Copa de la Liga: Semifinals
- Top goalscorer: League: Hugo Sánchez (15); All: Sanchez (24)
Home colours	Away colours

The 1982–83 season was Atlético Madrid's 42nd season since foundation in 1903 and the club's 38th season in La Liga, the top league of Spanish football. Atlético competed in La Liga, and the Copa del Rey.

== Squad ==
Note: Flags indicate national team as defined under FIFA eligibility rules; some limited exceptions apply. Players may hold more than one non-FIFA nationality.

No.	Pos.	Nation	Player
—	GK	ESP	Pereira
—	GK	ESP	Mejías
—	GK	ESP	Navarro
—	DF	FRG	Mirko Votava
—	DF	ESP	Arteche
—	DF	ESP	Balbino
—	DF	ESP	Juanjo
—	DF	ESP	Marcelino
—	DF	ESP	Ruiz
—	DF	ESP	Sierra
—	DF	ESP	Clemente
—	MF	ESP	Marián Díaz
-	MF	FRA	Jean-Francois Larios

No.	Pos.	Nation	Player
—	MF	ESP	Roberto Marina
—	MF	ESP	Mínguez
—	MF	ESP	Quique Ramos
—	MF	ESP	Román
—	MF	ESP	Julio Prieto
—	MF	ESP	Jesus Landaburu
—	FW	ESP	Juan José Rubio
—	FW	MEX	Hugo Sánchez
—	FW	ARG	Mario Cabrera
—	FW	ESP	Pedro Pablo
—	FW	ESP	Manolo Agujetas
—	FW	ESP	Pedraza

=== Transfers ===
In
Pos.	Name	from	Type
DF	Mirko Votava	Borussia Dortmund	
FW	Julio Prieto	CD Castellón	loan ended
MF	Landáburu	FC Barcelona	
MF	Manolo Agujetas		
FW	Pedraza	Racing de Santander	loan ended
GK	Pereira	Racing de Santander	loan ended

Out
Pos.	Name	To	Type
MF	Dirceu	Hellas Verona	
DF	Julio Alberto	FC Barcelona	
FW	Marcos Alonso	FC Barcelona	
MF	Román	UD Las Palmas	
MF	Rubén Cano	CD Tenerife	

==== Winter ====
In
Pos.	Name	from	Type
MF	Jean-Francois Larios	AS Saint-Étienne	

Out
Pos.	Name	To	Type

== Results ==
=== La Liga ===
==== Position by round ====
Round	1	2	3	4	5	6	7	8	9	10	11	12	13	14	15	16	17	18	19	20	21	22	23	24	25	26	27	28	29	30	31	32	33	34
Ground	A	H	A	H	A	H	A	H	A	H	A	H	H	A	H	A	H	H	A	H	A	H	A	H	A	H	A	H	A	A	H	A	H	A
Result	W	W	W	L	D	L	W	L	W	W	D	L	L	W	W	W	L	W	D	W	D	L	D	W	W	L	W	D	W	W	W	W	W	W
Position	3	2	1	3	2	8	8	8	8	6	7	8	8	8	6	6	7	7	7	5	5	6	6	5	5	6	5	5	4	4	4	4	4	3

Source: www.lfp.es
A = Away; H = Home; W = Win; D = Draw; L = Loss; = Leader, 1983–84 European Cup; = 1983–84 UEFA Cup

==== League table ====
Pos	Team	Pld	W	D	L	GF	GA	GD	Pts	Qualification or relegation
1	Athletic Bilbao (C)	34	22	6	6	71	36	+35	50	Qualification for the European Cup first round
2	Real Madrid	34	20	9	5	57	25	+32	49	Qualification for the UEFA Cup first round
3	Atlético Madrid	34	20	6	8	56	38	+18	46	Qualification for the UEFA Cup first round
4	Barcelona	34	17	10	7	60	29	+31	44	Qualification for the Cup Winners' Cup first round (Note: Barcelona qualified for the European Cup Winners' Cup by winning the Copa del Rey.)
5	Sevilla	34	15	12	7	44	31	+13	42	Qualification for the UEFA Cup first round

Source: BDFútbol
Rules for classification: 1) Points; 2) Head-to-head results; 3) Goal difference; 4) Number of goals scored
(C) Champions

==== Matches ====
Win Draw Loss

4 September 1982 1	Atlético Madrid	1–0	UD Salamanca	Madrid
	Hugo Sánchez 45' (pen.)	Report		Stadium: Vicente Calderón Stadium; Referee: Bartolome Riera Moro

10 September 1982 2	Real Betis	1–3	Atlético Madrid	Sevilla
	Cardeñosa 59'	Report	65' (pen.) Hugo Sánchez; 83' Landaburu; 89' Quique Ramos	Stadium: Estadio Benito Villamarin; Referee: Garcia de Loza

18 September 1982 3	Atlético Madrid	5–2	Celta Vigo	Madrid
	Pedraza 20'; Hugo Sánchez 21'; Hugo Sánchez 42'; Landaburu 79'; Pedraza 87'	Report	Del Cura 55'; Juanjo 89'	Stadium: Vicente Calderón Stadium; Referee: Luis Jaramillo Gonzalez

26 September 1982 4	Real Madrid	3–1	Atlético Madrid	Madrid
	Ito 34'; Isidro 50'; Pineda 80'	Report	Rubio 59'; Juanjo (yellow card); Arteche (yellow card); Julio Prieto (yellow card)	Stadium: Estadio Santiago Bernabéu; Referee: Victoriano Sanchez Arminio

2 October 1982 5	Atlético Madrid	1–1	FC Barcelona	Madrid
	Hugo Sánchez 43' (pen.) (yellow card); Pereira (yellow card)	Report	Marcos Alonso 83'; Julio Alberto (yellow card); Moratalla (yellow card)	Stadium: Vicente Calderón Stadium; Referee: Garcia de Loza

10 October 1982 6	Athletic Bilbao	4–1	Atlético Madrid	Gijón
	Sola 28'; Dani 37'; Liceranzu 47'; Noriega 67'	Report	Arteche 32'; Hugo Sánchez (yellow card)	Stadium: Estadio El Molinon; Referee: Ernesto Burgos Nuñez

17 October 1982 7	Atlético Madrid	1–0	UD Las Palmas	Madrid
	Landaburu 58'	Report		Stadium: Vicente Calderón Stadium; Referee: Antonio Martin Navarrete

24 October 1982 8	CA Osasuna	4–2	Atlético Madrid	Pamplona
	Enrique Martin 10'; Iriguibel 12'; Iriguibel 43'; Bayona 73'	Report	Arteche 39'; Landaburu 66'	Stadium: Estadio El Sadar; Referee: Enriquez Negreira

30 October 1982 9	Atlético Madrid	2–1	Valencia CF	Madrid
	Mirko Votava 12'; Hugo Sánchez 65'	Report	Kurt Welzl 79'	Stadium: Vicente Calderón Stadium; Referee: Joaquin Ramos Marcos

6 November 1982 10	Real Valladolid	1–3	Atlético Madrid	Valladolid
	Paco Fortes 68'	Report	Arteche 24'; Hugo Sánchez 35'; Julio Prieto 87'	Stadium: Estadio Jose Zorrilla; Referee: Jaime Esquerdo Guerrero

9 November 1982 11	Atlético Madrid	1–1	Sevilla FC	Madrid
	Mirko Votava 63'	Report	Francisco 8'	Stadium: Vicente Calderón Stadium; Referee: Jose Pes Perez

20 November 1982 12	Real Zaragoza	2–1	Atlético Madrid	Zaragoza
	Güerri 21'; Raul Amarilla 57'	Report	Hugo Sánchez 15'	Stadium: La Romareda; Referee: Bartolome Jimenez Madrid

27 November 1982 13	Real Sociedad	1–0	Atlético Madrid	San Sebastián
	Larrañaga 59'	Report		Stadium: Estadio Anoeta; Referee: Garcia de Loza

4 December 1982 14	Atlético Madrid	1–0	RCD Español	Madrid
	Hugo Sánchez 10'	Report		Stadium: Vicente Calderón Stadium; Referee: Ildefonso Urizar Azpitarte

10 December 1982 15	CD Málaga	0–2	Atlético Madrid	Málaga
		Report	Julio Prieto 4'; Hugo Sánchez 89' (pen.)	Stadium: Estadio Mestalla; Referee: Antonio Martin Navarrete

18 December 1982 16	Atlético Madrid	2–1	Sporting de Gijón	Madrid
	Cabrera 56'; Rubio 71' (pen.)	Report	Urrecho 7'	Stadium: Vicente Calderón Stadium; Referee: Bartolome Riera Morro

1 January 1983 17	Racing de Santander	4–0	Atlético Madrid	Pamplona
	Mantilla 30'; Juan Verón 76'; Angulo 79'; Cidon 89'	Report		Stadium: Estadio El Sadar; Referee: Victoriano Sanchez Arminio

5 January 1983 18	UD Salamanca	1–2	Atlético Madrid	Villares de la Reina
	Angel Gonzalez 1'	Report	Landaburu 33'; Quique Ramos 40'	Stadium: Estadio Helmántico; Referee: Antonio Borras del Barrio

5 January 1983 19	Atlético Madrid	0–0	Real Betis	Madrid
		Report		Stadium: Vicente Calderón Stadium; Referee: Ildefonso Urizar Azpitarte

15 January 1983 20	Celta Vigo	0–4	Atlético Madrid	Vigo
		Report	Arteche 52'; Rubio 59'; Marina 82'; Marina 88'	Stadium: Estadio Balaídos; Referee: Bartolome Jimenez

22 January 1983 21	Atlético Madrid	0–0	Real Madrid	Madrid
		Report		Stadium: Vicente Calderón Stadium; Referee: Felipe Crespo Aurre

29 January 1983 22	FC Barcelona	2–1	Atlético Madrid	Barcelona
	Perico Alonso 17'; Bernd Schuster 43'	Report	82' Landaburu	Stadium: Camp Nou; Referee: Joaquin Urio Velazquez

5 February 1983 23	Atlético Madrid	0–0	Athletic Bilbao	Madrid
		Report		Stadium: Vicente Calderón Stadium; Referee: Jose Merino Gonzalez

8 February 1983 24	UD Las Palmas	1–2	Atlético Madrid	Palma de Mallorca
	Juani 19'	Report	Marina 7'; Rubio 42'	Referee: Jesus Ausocua Sanz

19 February 1983 25	Atlético Madrid	2–1	CA Osasuna	Madrid
	Julio Prieto 34'; Hugo Sánchez 65' (pen.)	Report	Echeverria 9'	Stadium: Vicente Calderón Stadium; Referee: Juan Andújar Oliver

25 February 1983 26	Valencia CF	1–0	Atlético Madrid	Valencia
	Castellanos 15'	Report		Stadium: Estadio Mestalla

5 March 1983 27	Atlético Madrid	2–1	Real Valladolid	Madrid
	Rubio 46' (pen.); Mirko Votava 57'	Report	Jorge Da Silva 83' (pen.)	Stadium: Vicente Calderón Stadium; Referee: Garcia de Loza

12 March 1983 28	Sevilla FC	1–1	Atlético Madrid	Seville
	Santi 83'	Report	Julio Prieto 11'	Stadium: Ramon Sanchez Pizjuan

19 March 1983 29	Atlético Madrid	2–0	Real Zaragoza	Madrid
	Hugo Sánchez 32'; Julio Prieto 46'	Report		Stadium: Estadio Vicente Calderón

26 March 1983 30	Atlético Madrid	2–0	Real Sociedad	Madrid
	Marina 57'; Hugo Sánchez 74' (pen.)	Report		Stadium: Vicente Calderón Stadium

1 April 1983 31	RCD Español	1–2	Atlético Madrid	Barcelona
	Tintin Marquez 65'	Report	Marina 62'; Hugo Sánchez 71'	Stadium: Estadio Sarria

9 April 1983 32	Atlético Madrid	3–0	CD Málaga	Madrid
	Hugo Sánchez 50' (pen.); Mirko Votava 55'; Julio Prieto 88'	Report		Stadium: Vicente Calderón Stadium; Referee: Antonio Martin Navarrete

16 April 1983 33	Sporting Gijón	2–3	Atlético Madrid	Gijón
	Maceda 33'; Maceda 74'	Report	Ruiz 5'; Julio Prieto 25'; Landaburu 44'	Stadium: Estadio El Molinon; Referee: Bartolome Jimenez

30 April 1983 34	Atlético Madrid	3–1	Racing Santander	Madrid
	Ruiz 60'; Manolo Agujetas 70'; Cabrera 89'	Report	Cidon 3'	Stadium: Vicente Calderón Stadium; Referee: Joaquin Ramos Marcos

=== Copa del Rey ===
==== First round ====
15 September 1982	Cacereño	1–1	Atlético Madrid	Cáceres
	Mulas 80'	Report	53' Marián	Stadium: Príncipe Felipe

22 September 1982	Atlético Madrid	4–2	Cacereño	Madrid
	Sánchez 55', 118'; Marián 65', 104'	Report	33' (aut) Clemente; 80' (rig) Emilio	Stadium: Vicente Calderón

==== Second round ====
20 October 1982	CP Mérida	0–2	Atlético Madrid	Mérida
		Report	42' Marina; 85' Julio Prieto	Stadium: Estadio Romano; Referee: Bartolomé Jiménez Madrid

3 November 1982	Atlético Madrid	1–0	CP Mérida	Madrid
	Mínguez 22'	Report		Stadium: Vicente Calderón; Referee: Sebastián Damín Rendón

==== Third round ====
24 November 1982	Atlético Madrid	1–2	RCD Mallorca	Madrid
20:00	Quique 24'	Report	16' Riadó; 87' Barrera	Stadium: Estadio Vicente Calderón; Attendance: 15,000; Referee: Antonio Martín Navarrete

7 December 1982	RCD Mallorca	2–1 (4–2 agg.)	Atlético Madrid	Palma
20:30	Riadó 44'; López 60'	Report	81' Sánchez	Stadium: Estadio Son Moix; Referee: Felipe Crespo Aurre

=== Copa de La Liga ===
7 May 1983	UD Salamanca	0–0	Atlético Madrid	Villares de la Reina
20:00		Report		Stadium: Helmántico; Attendance: 7,000; Referee: Ildefonso Urizar Azpitarte

20 May 1983	Atlético Madrid	4–1 (4–1 agg.)	UD Salamanca	Madrid
20:30	Landáburu 32', 89'; Sánchez 53', 72'	Report	57' Ángel González	Stadium: Vicente Calderón Stadium; Attendance: 25,000; Referee: Ildefonso Urizar Azpitarte

==== Eightfinals ====
31 May 1983	Atlético Madrid	3–0	Athletic Bilbao	Madrid
20:00	Pedraza 14'; Landáburu 37'; Sánchez 63'	Report		Stadium: Estadio Vicente Calderón; Referee: Joaquín Ramos Marcos

7 June 1983	Athletic Bilbao	2–0 (2–3 agg.)	Atlético Madrid	Bilbao
20:30	Sarabia 46'; Sola 47'	Report		Stadium: San Mamés; Attendance: 10,000; Referee: Bartolomé Jiménez Madrid

==== Quarterfinals ====
10 June 1983	UD Las Palmas	1–0	Atlético Madrid	Las Palmas
20:00	Martínez 20'	Report		Stadium: Insular; Referee: Joaquín Urío Velázquez

14 June 1983	Atlético Madrid	3–0 (3–1 agg.)	UD Las Palmas	Madrid
20:30	Pedraza 26'; Marina 39'; Sánchez 70' (rig)	Report		Stadium: Vicente Calderón Stadium; Attendance: 30,000; Referee: Joaquín Ramos Marcos

==== Semifinals ====
18 June 1983	Atlético Madrid	1–0	FC Barcelona	Madrid
20:00	Marina 26'	Report		Stadium: Estadio Vicente Calderón; Attendance: 54,000; Referee: Raúl García De Loza

21 June 1983	FC Barcelona	5–2 (5–3 agg.)	Atlético Madrid	Barcelona
20:30	Schuster 9'; Víctor 36'; Carrasco 41'; Maradona 65'; Marcos 79'	Report	75', 90' Sánchez	Stadium: Camp Nou; Referee: José Donato Pes Pérez

== Squad statistics ==
=== Players statistics ===
No.	Pos	Nat	Player	Total		Primera Division		Copa del Rey		Copa de la Liga	
No.	Pos	Nat	Player	Apps	Goals	Apps	Goals	Apps	Goals	Apps	Goals
-	GK	(Spain) ESP	Mejias	35	-35	23	-21	4	-5	8	-9
-	DF	(West Germany) FRG	Miroslav Votava	44	4	31	4	4+1	0	8	0
-	DF	(Spain) ESP	Ruiz	36	2	26	2	2	0	8	0
-	DF	(Spain) ESP	Arteche	44	4	31	4	5	0	8	0
-	DF	(Spain) ESP	Clemente	31	0	17+2	0	4	0	8	0
-	MF	(Spain) ESP	Julio Prieto	45	8	31+2	7	5+1	1	6	0
-	MF	(Spain) ESP	Quique Ramos	42	3	33	2	3	1	6	0
-	MF	(Spain) ESP	Landaburu	42	10	27+4	7	3+1	0	7	3
-	FW	(Spain) ESP	Pedraza	40	4	27+4	2	3	0	6	2
-	FW	(Mexico) MEX	Hugo Sánchez	43	24	31	15	3+1	3	8	6
-	FW	(Spain) ESP	Rubio	32	5	26+4	5	2	0		
-	GK	(Spain) ESP	Pereira	13	-19	11	-17	2	-2		
-	MF	(Spain) ESP	Marina	33	8	16+9	5	2	1	6	2
-	DF	(Spain) ESP	Balbino	16	0	13	0	0+1	0	1+1	0
-	DF	(Spain) ESP	Marcelino	28	0	13+3	0	6	0	5+1	0
-	DF	(Spain) ESP	Juanjo	17	0	12+2	0	3	0		
-	FW	(Argentina) ARG	Mario Cabrera	17	2	5+4	2	3+1	0	1+3	0
-	MF	(Spain) ESP	Minguez	10	1	5	0	5	1		
-	MF	(Spain) ESP	Pedro Pablo	10	0	5	0	1	0	2+2	0
-	MF	(Spain) ESP	Marian	9	3	3	0	4	3	0+2	0
-	MF	(Spain) ESP	Manolo Agujetas	13	1	1+4	1	2+2	0	0+4	0
-	GK	(Spain) ESP	Abel Resino	0	0	0	0	0	0		
-	MF	(France) FRA	Jean-Francois Larios	0	0	0	0	0	0	0	0

- Source: https://www.bdfutbol.com/en/t/t1982-837.html
