= List of Atlético Madrid seasons =

This is a list of seasons played by Atlético Madrid in Spanish and European football. Established in 1903, the seasons from the beginning of the La Liga in 1928 to the most recent completed season are mentioned. It details the club's achievements in major competitions, and the top scorers for each season.

The club has won La Liga eleven times, the Spanish Cup ten times, the Spanish Super Cup twice, and the Copa Eva Duarte once.

== Key ==
Key to league record:

- Pos = Final position
- Pld = Matches played
- W = Matches won
- D = Matches drawn
- L = Matches lost
- GF = Goals for
- GA = Goals against
- GD = Goal difference
- Pts = Points

Key to rounds:

- W = Winners
- F = Final (Runners-up)
- SF = Semi-finals
- QF = Quarter-finals
- R16 = Round of 16
- R32 = Round of 32
- R64 = Round of 64
- R5 = Fifth round
- R4 = Fourth round
- R3 = Third round
- R2 = Second round
- R1 = First round
- GS = Group stage

Key to competitions

- Cup = Copa del Rey
- Sup. = Supercopa de España
- LC = Copa de la Liga
- CL = UEFA Champions League / European Cup
- UC = UEFA Europa League / UEFA Cup
- CW = UEFA Cup Winners' Cup
- IC = UEFA Intertoto Cup
- SC = UEFA Super Cup
- CWC = FIFA Club World Cup / Intercontinental Cup

Champions	Runners-up	Pichichi	CL	EL	Promoted	Relegated

== Seasons ==
Seasons of Atlético Madrid
Season	League									Cup	Sup.	LC	Other competitions						Top scorer(s)	
Season	Division	Pld	W	D	L	GF	GA	Pts	Pos	Cup	Sup.	LC	CL	UC	CW	IC	SC	CWC	Player(s)	Goals
1928–29	La Liga	18	8	2	8	43	41	18	6th	QF									(Spain) Cosme Vázquez	24
1929–30	La Liga	18	5	2	11	32	50	12	10th	R32									(Spain) Luis Marín	24
1930–31	Segunda División	18	11	1	6	47	31	23	3rd	R32									(Spain) Santiago Losada Amor	15
1931–32	Segunda División	16	8	2	6	38	34	18	4th	R16									(Spain) Santiago Buiría	15
1932–33	Segunda División	18	12	3	3	58	26	27	2nd	R16									(Spain) Manuel Guijarro	17
1933–34	Segunda División	18	11	2	5	45	28	24	2nd	1R									(Spain) Julio Elícegui	15
1934–35	La Liga	22	8	5	9	53	38	21	7th	QF									(Spain) Julio Elícegui	28
1935–36	La Liga	22	6	3	13	34	50	15	11th	3R									(Spain) Julio Elícegui	14
1936–39	Spanish Civil War																			
1939–40	La Liga	22	14	1	7	43	29	29	W	R16									(Spain) Enrique Rubio	13
1940–41	La Liga	22	13	7	2	70	36	33	W	QF	W								(Spain) Pruden Sánchez	39
1941–42	La Liga	26	14	5	7	50	44	33	3rd	QF	W								(Spain) Paco Campos	20
1942–43	La Liga	26	11	5	10	54	44	27	8th	QF									(Spain) Mariano Uceda	16
1943–44	La Liga	26	15	4	7	66	49	34	2nd	SF									(Spain) Paco Campos	17
1944–45	La Liga	26	13	5	8	46	41	31	3rd	QF									(Spain) Paco Campos	12
1945–46	La Liga	26	10	6	10	50	48	26	7th	QF									(Spain) Paco Campos	16
1946–47	La Liga	26	13	6	7	58	44	32	3rd	R16									(Spain) Manuel Jorge Sosa	13
1947–48	La Liga	26	13	7	6	73	45	33	3rd	QF									(Spain) Antonio Vidal	19
1948–49	La Liga	26	15	4	7	54	32	34	3rd	QF									(Spain) Adrián Escudero	17
1949–50	La Liga	26	15	3	8	71	51	33	W	QF									(Morocco) Larbi Benbarek	16
1950–51	La Liga	30	17	6	7	87	50	40	W	QF	RU								(Spain) Adrián Escudero	19
1951–52	La Liga	30	16	5	9	80	57	37	4th	1R	W								(Spain) José Juncosa	16
1952–53	La Liga	30	13	4	13	65	70	30	8th	SF									(Spain) Adrián Escudero	25
1953–54	La Liga	30	11	7	12	57	47	29	9th	1R									(Spain) Adrián Escudero	16
1954–55	La Liga	30	11	7	12	59	64	29	8th	R16									(Spain) Adrián Escudero	11
1955–56	La Liga	30	14	5	11	75	49	33	5th	RU									(Spain) Adrián Escudero	21
1956–57	La Liga	30	15	4	11	65	45	34	5th	R16									(Spain) Joaquin Peirò	13
1957–58	La Liga	30	16	10	4	78	43	42	2nd	R16									(Spain) Agustín Sánchez Quesada	14
1958–59	La Liga	30	13	6	11	58	48	32	5th	QF			SF						(Brazil) Vavá	25
1959–60	La Liga	30	15	3	12	59	40	33	5th	W									(Spain) Joaquin Peirò	25
1960–61	La Liga	30	17	6	7	57	35	40	2nd	W									(Spain) Joaquin Peirò	17
1961–62	La Liga	30	15	6	9	50	36	36	3rd	R8					W				(Spain) Miguel Jones	19
1962–63	La Liga	30	14	9	7	61	36	37	2nd	QF					RU				(Spain) Adelardo Rodríguez	13
1963–64	La Liga	30	10	9	11	37	34	29	7th	RU				2R					(Spain) Enrique Collar	10
1964–65	La Liga	30	20	3	7	58	27	43	2nd	W				SF					(Spain) Luis Aragonés	28
1965–66	La Liga	30	18	8	4	54	20	44	W	QF					QF				(Spain) Luis Aragonés	20
1966–67	La Liga	30	14	7	9	57	30	35	4th	QF			2R						(Spain) Luis Aragonés	19
1967–68	La Liga	30	12	9	9	38	32	33	6th	SF				2R					(Spain) Luis Aragonés	16
1968–69	La Liga	30	10	10	10	40	37	30	6th	QF				1R		GS			(Spain) José Eulogio Gárate	14
1969–70	La Liga	30	18	6	6	53	22	42	W	R16									(Spain) José Eulogio Gárate	16
1970–71	La Liga	30	17	8	5	51	20	42	3rd	SF			SF						(Spain) José Eulogio Gárate	22
1971–72	La Liga	34	14	11	9	45	28	39	4th	W				1R					(Spain) Luis Aragonés	14
1972–73	La Liga	34	20	8	6	49	29	48	W	5R					2R				(Spain) Luis Aragonés	18
1973–74	La Liga	34	18	6	10	50	31	42	2nd	SF			RU						(Spain) José Eulogio Gárate	15
1974–75	La Liga	34	11	13	10	46	34	35	6th	RU				2R				W	(Spain) José Eulogio Gárate	18
1975–76	La Liga	34	18	6	10	60	38	42	3rd	W					2R				(Brazil) Leivinha	19
1976–77	La Liga	34	19	8	7	62	33	46	W	16R					SF				(Spain) Rubén Cano	20
1977–78	La Liga	34	16	4	14	61	52	36	6th	QF			QF						(Spain) Rubén Cano	24
1978–79	La Liga	34	14	13	7	55	37	41	3rd	3R									(Spain) Rubén Cano	23
1979–80	La Liga	34	10	11	13	38	44	31	12th	SF				1R					(Spain) Rubén Cano	14
1980–81	La Liga	34	16	10	8	46	39	42	3rd	R16									(Argentina) Mario Cabrera	11
1981–82	La Liga	34	15	4	15	38	37	34	8th	QF				1R					(Mexico) Hugo Sánchez	12
1982–83	La Liga	34	20	6	8	56	38	46	3rd	3R		SF							(Mexico) Hugo Sánchez	24
1983–84	La Liga	34	17	8	9	53	47	42	4th	R16		RU		1R					(Mexico) Hugo Sánchez	18
1984–85	La Liga	34	16	11	7	51	28	43	2nd	W		RU		1R					(Mexico) Hugo Sánchez	28
1985–86	La Liga	34	17	8	9	53	38	42	5th	QF	W	SF			RU				(Uruguay) Jorge da Silva	18
1986–87	La Liga	44	18	11	15	58	54	47	7th	RU				2R					(Spain) Julio Salinas	18
1987–88	La Liga	38	19	10	9	60	38	48	3rd	QF									(Spain) Julio Salinas	18
1988–89	La Liga	38	19	8	11	69	45	46	4th	SF				1R					(Brazil) Baltazar	42
1989–90	La Liga	38	20	10	8	55	35	50	4th	R16				1R					(Brazil) Baltazar	19
1990–91	La Liga	38	17	13	8	52	28	47	2nd	W				1R					(Spain) Manolo	18
1991–92	La Liga	38	24	5	9	67	35	53	3rd	W	RU				QF				(Spain) Manolo	36
1992–93	La Liga	38	16	11	11	52	42	43	6th	R16	RU				SF				(Mexico) Luis García	20
1993–94	La Liga	38	13	9	16	54	54	35	12th	R16				2R					(Mexico) Luis García	13
1994–95	La Liga	38	13	9	16	56	54	35	14th	QF									(Spain) José Luis Caminero	11
1995–96	La Liga	42	26	9	7	75	32	87	W	W									(Bulgaria) Lyuboslav Penev	22
1996–97	La Liga	42	20	11	11	76	64	71	5th	QF	RU		QF						(Argentina) Juan Esnáider	21
1997–98	La Liga	38	16	12	10	79	56	60	7th	R16				SF					(Italy) Christian Vieri	29
1998–99	La Liga	38	12	10	16	54	50	46	13th	RU				SF					(Spain) José Mari	16
1999–2000	La Liga	38	9	11	18	48	64	38	19th	RU				R16					(Netherlands) Jimmy Floyd Hasselbaink	35
2000–01	Segunda División	42	21	11	10	59	39	74	4th	SF									(Spain) Salva Ballesta	26
2001–02	Segunda División	42	23	10	9	68	44	79	1st	R64									(Uruguay) Diego Alonso	22
2002–03	La Liga	38	12	11	15	51	56	47	12th	QF									(Spain) Fernando Torres	14
2003–04	La Liga	38	15	10	13	51	53	55	7th	QF									(Spain) Fernando Torres	21
2004–05	La Liga	38	13	11	14	40	34	50	11th	SF						RU			(Spain) Fernando Torres	20
2005–06	La Liga	38	13	13	12	45	37	52	10th	R16									(Spain) Fernando Torres	13
2006–07	La Liga	38	17	9	12	46	39	60	7th	R16									(Spain) Fernando Torres	15
2007–08	La Liga	38	19	7	12	66	47	64	4th	QF				R32		W			(Argentina) Sergio Agüero	27
2008–09	La Liga	38	20	7	11	80	57	67	4th	QF			R16						(Uruguay) Diego Forlán	35
2009–10	La Liga	38	13	8	17	57	61	47	9th	RU			GS	W					(Uruguay) Diego Forlán	28
2010–11	La Liga	38	17	7	14	62	53	58	7th	QF				GS			W		(Argentina) Sergio Agüero	27
2011–12	La Liga	38	15	11	12	53	46	56	5th	R32				W					(Colombia) Radamel Falcao	36
2012–13	La Liga	38	23	7	8	65	31	76	3rd	W				R32			W		(Colombia) Radamel Falcao	34
2013–14	La Liga	38	28	6	4	77	26	90	W	SF	RU		RU						(Spain) Diego Costa	36
2014–15	La Liga	38	23	9	6	67	29	78	3rd	QF	W		QF						(France) Antoine Griezmann	25
2015–16	La Liga	38	28	4	6	63	18	88	3rd	QF			RU						(France) Antoine Griezmann	32
2016–17	La Liga	38	23	9	6	70	27	78	3rd	SF			SF						(France) Antoine Griezmann	26
2017–18	La Liga	38	23	10	5	58	22	79	2nd	QF			GS	W					(France) Antoine Griezmann	29
2018–19	La Liga	38	22	10	6	55	29	76	2nd	R16			R16				W		(France) Antoine Griezmann	21
2019–20	La Liga	38	18	16	4	51	27	70	3rd	R32	RU		QF						(Spain) Álvaro Morata	16
2020–21	La Liga	38	26	8	4	67	25	86	W	2R			R16						(Uruguay) Luis Suárez	21
2021–22	La Liga	38	21	8	9	65	43	71	3rd	R16	SF		QF						(Argentina) Ángel Correa (Uruguay) Luis Suárez	13
2022–23	La Liga	38	23	8	7	70	33	77	3rd	QF			GS						(France) Antoine Griezmann	16
2023–24	La Liga	38	24	4	10	70	43	76	4th	SF	SF		QF						(France) Antoine Griezmann	24
2024–25	La Liga	38	22	10	6	68	30	76	3rd	SF			R16					GS	(Argentina) Julián Alvarez	29
2025–26	La Liga	38	21	6	11	62	44	69	4th	RU	SF		SF						(Norway) Alexander Sørloth (Argentina) Julián Alvarez	20
