= 1985 Copa del Rey final =

Copa del Rey 1985 final
- Event: 1984–85 Copa del Rey
Atlético Madrid	Athletic Bilbao
2	1
- Date: 30 June 1985
- Venue: Santiago Bernabéu Stadium, Madrid
- Referee: José María Miguel Pérez
- Attendance: 85,000

The 1985 Copa del Rey final was the 83rd final of the King's Cup. The final was played at Santiago Bernabéu Stadium in Madrid, on 30 June 1985, being won by Atlético Madrid, who beat Athletic Bilbao 2–1.

== Match details ==
30 June 1985
21:00 CET

Atlético Madrid	2−1	Athletic Bilbao
Sánchez 24' (pen.), 55'	Report	J. Salinas 75'

Santiago Bernabéu Stadium, Madrid
Attendance: 85,000
Referee: José María Miguel Pérez

Atlético Madrid

Athletic Bilbao

GK	1	(Spain) Ángel Mejías
DF	2	(West Germany) Miroslav Votava
DF	4	(Spain) Juan Carlos Arteche
DF	5	(Spain) Miguel Ángel Ruiz (c)
DF	3	(Spain) Clemente		(substituted off) 61'
MF	6	(Spain) Julio Prieto	(yellow card) 30'
MF	7	(Spain) Roberto Marina
MF	10	(Spain) Jesús Landáburu
MF	8	(Spain) Quique Ramos	(yellow card) 35'
FW	9	(Mexico) Hugo Sánchez	(yellow card) 23'
FW	11	(Spain) Juan José Rubio	(yellow card) 53'	(substituted off) 82'
Substitutes:
DF	12	(Spain) Balbino		(substituted on) 61'
GK	13	(Spain) Carlos Pereira
MF	14	(Spain) Ricardo Mínguez		(substituted on) 82'
FW	15	(Spain) Enrique Morán
DF	16	(Spain) Juanjo
Manager:
(Spain) Luis Aragonés

GK	1	(Spain) Andoni Zubizarreta
DF	2	(Spain) Santiago Urquiaga
DF	4	(Spain) Liceranzu	(red card) 88'
DF	5	(Spain) Andoni Goikoetxea
DF	3	(Spain) Luis de la Fuente
MF	11	(Spain) Patxi Salinas		(substituted off) 55'
MF	6	(Spain) Miguel de Andrés	(yellow card) 33'
MF	8	(Spain) José Ramón Gallego
FW	10	(Spain) Ismael Urtubi	(yellow card) 42'
FW	9	(Spain) Julio Salinas
FW	7	(Spain) Dani (c)		(substituted off) 55'
Substitutes:
GK	12	(Spain) Carlos Meléndez
DF	13	(Spain) José María Núñez
FW	14	(Spain) Manuel Sarabia		(substituted on) 55'
FW	15	(Spain) Endika		(substituted on) 55'
FW	16	(Spain) Estanislao Argote
Manager:
(Spain) Javier Clemente

MATCH RULES

- 90 minutes.
- 30 minutes of extra-time if necessary.
- Penalty shoot-out if scores still level.
- Five named substitutes.
- Maximum of two substitutions.

== See also ==
Same finalists:

- 1921 Copa del Rey Final
- 1956 Copa del Generalísimo Final
- 2012 UEFA Europa League Final
