= 1986 European Cup Winners' Cup final =

- Match programme cover
- Event: 1985–86 European Cup Winners' Cup
Atlético Madrid	Dynamo Kiev
(Spain)	(Soviet Union)
0	3
- Date: 2 May 1986
- Venue: Stade de Gerland, Lyon
- Referee: Franz Wöhrer (Austria)
- Attendance: 39,300

The 1986 European Cup Winners' Cup Final was a football match contested between Atlético Madrid of Spain and FC Dynamo Kyiv of the Soviet Union. It was the final match of the 1985–86 European Cup Winners' Cup and the 26th competition final.

The final game was held at Stade de Gerland in Lyon, France. Kyiv won the match 3–0 thanks to goals by Aleksandr Zavarov, Oleg Blokhin and Vadim Yevtushenko.

== Route to the final ==
(Spain) Atlético Madrid					(Soviet Union) Dynamo Kiev			
Opponent	Agg.	1st leg	2nd leg		Opponent	Agg.	1st leg	2nd leg
(Scotland) Celtic	3–2	1–1 (H)	2–1 (A)	First round	(Netherlands) Utrecht	5–3	1–2 (A)	4–1 (H)
(Wales) Bangor City	3–0	2–0 (A)	1–0 (H)	Second round	(Romania) Universitatea Craiova	5–2	2–2 (A)	3–0 (H)
(Socialist Federal Republic of Yugoslavia) Red Star Belgrade	3–1	2–0 (A)	1–1 (H)	Quarter-finals	(Austria) Rapid Wien	9–2	4–1 (A)	5–1 (H)
(West Germany) Bayer Uerdingen	4–2	1–0 (H)	3–2 (A)	Semi-finals	(Czechoslovakia) Dukla Prague	4–1	3–0 (H)	1–1 (A)

== Match ==
=== Details ===
2 May 1986
20:15 CEST

Atlético Madrid (Spain)	0–3	(Soviet Union) Dynamo Kiev
	Report	Zavarov 5'; Blokhin 85'; Yevtushenko 88'

Stade de Gerland, Lyon
Attendance: 39,300
Referee: Franz Wöhrer (Austria)

Atlético Madrid	Dynamo Kyiv

GK	1	(Argentina) Ubaldo Fillol
RB	2	(Spain) Tomás Reñones
LB	3	(Spain) Clemente
CB	4	(Spain) Juan Carlos Arteche
CB	5	(Spain) Miguel Ángel Ruiz (c)
RM	6	(Spain) Julio Prieto
CF	7	(Argentina) Mario Cabrera
CM	8	(Spain) Quique Ramos
CF	9	(Uruguay) Jorge da Silva
CM	10	(Spain) Jesús Landáburu (yellow card) 16'	(substituted off) 61'
LM	11	(Spain) Roberto Marina
Substitutes:
DF	12	(Spain) Balbino García
GK	13	(Spain) Ángel Mejías
MF	14	(Spain) Quique Setién	(substituted on) 61'
FF	15	(Spain) Pedraza Gómez
FF	16	(Spain) Juan José Rubio
Manager:
(Spain) Luis Aragonés

GK	1	(Soviet Union) Viktor Chanov
RB	2	(Soviet Union) Vladimir Bezsonov
CB	3	(Soviet Union) Sergei Baltacha	(substituted off) 38'
CB	4	(Soviet Union) Oleg Kuznetsov
LM	5	(Soviet Union) Vasili Rats
RM	6	(Soviet Union) Ivan Yaremchuk
CM	7	(Soviet Union) Pavel Yakovenko
LB	8	(Soviet Union) Anatoliy Demyanenko (c)
CM	9	(Soviet Union) Aleksandr Zavarov	(substituted off) 70'
CF	10	(Soviet Union) Igor Belanov
CF	11	(Soviet Union) Oleg Blokhin
Substitutes:
GK	12	(Soviet Union) Mikhail Mikhailov
DF	13	(Soviet Union) Vasili Yevseyev
MF	14	(Soviet Union) Andrey Bal	(substituted on) 38'
MF	15	(Soviet Union) Vadim Yevtushenko	(substituted on) 70'
MF	16	(Soviet Union) Aleksey Mikhailichenko
Manager:
(Soviet Union) Valeri Lobanovsky

Assistant referees:
Gerald Losert (Austria)
Hubert Forstinger (Austria)

Match rules

- 90 minutes.
- 30 minutes of extra time if necessary.
- Penalty shoot-out if scores still level.
- Five named substitutes.
- Maximum of two substitutions.

== See also ==
- 1985–86 European Cup Winners' Cup
- 1986 European Cup Final
- 1986 UEFA Cup Final
- Atlético Madrid in European football
- FC Dynamo Kyiv in European football
