= 1987–88 Copa del Rey =

86th Copa del Rey

Tournament details
- Country: Spain

Final positions
- Champions: FC Barcelona
- Runners-up: Real Sociedad

The 1987–88 Copa del Rey was the 86th staging of the Copa del Rey. The trophy was won by FC Barcelona after beating defending champions Real Sociedad 1–0 in the final.

== Third round ==
Team 1	Agg.	Team 2	1st leg	2nd leg
Atlético Madrileño	3–6	Elche CF	0–1	3–5
Real Avilés	2–3	CD Eldense	2–1	0–2
Albacete Balompié	2–5	UE Figueres	0–3	2–2
Polideportivo Almería	1–9	Castilla CF	0–3	1–6
CD Arnedo	3–2	CD Lugo	2–1	1–1
Santoña CF	0–7	Linares CF	0–2	0–5
Sanvicenteño FC	0–5	UD Salamanca	0–0	0–5
CF Gandía	1–3	Rayo Vallecano	1–1	0–2
Gimnàstic de Tarragona	1–0	Caudal Deportivo	1–0	0–0
Levante UD	2–6	CD Logroñés	0–1	2–5
CD Basconia	1–1 (p)	Bergantiños FC	0–0	1–1
Bilbao Athletic	4–3	Sevilla Atlético	3–3	1–0
UDC Chantrea	2–8	Celta de Vigo	2–1	0–7
Córdoba CF	3–2	Xerez CD	2–0	1–2
SD Eibar	1–6	Real Oviedo	1–1	0–5
Valencia Mestalla	4–11	Recreativo de Huelva	1–3	3–8
CD Badajoz	1–3	CD Ourense	0–1	1–2
CD Badía	1–3	CD Castellón	0–1	1–2
UD Poblense	2–4	Hércules CF	1–0	1–4
UD Fraga	1–3	Real Burgos CF	0–1	1–2
CD Teruel	2–4	Málaga CF	2–1	0–3
Real Balompédica Linense	2–3	Cartagena FC	2–2	0–1
Gimnástica de Torrelavega		CD Tenerife		
Getafe CF	4–2	Deportivo de La Coruña	2–0	2–2
UE Lleida	1–4	Barcelona Atletic	0–1	1–3
CD Maspalomas	0–3	Valencia CF	0–1	0–2

Bye: Sestao Sport Club

== Fourth round ==
Team 1	Agg.	Team 2	1st leg	2nd leg
Elche CF	2–1	Málaga CF	2–0	0–1
CD Arnedo	2–9	Hércules CF	2–3	0–6
UD Salamanca	1–3	Valencia CF	0–2	1–1
Gimnàstic de Tarragona	3–9	Celta de Vigo	1–1	2–8
CD Eldense	2–1	Bilbao Athletic	0–0	2–1
CD Ourense	0–4	Recreativo de Huelva	0–2	0–2
Rayo Vallecano	7–5	Bergantiños FC	3–2	4–3
CD Tenerife	2–4	Barcelona Atletic	0–1	2–3
Real Burgos CF	2–3	Cartagena FC	0–0	2–3
Córdoba CF	2–4	Castilla CF	2–0	0–4
Getafe CF	1–4	Sestao Sport Club	1–0	0–4
CD Castellón	3–3 (4–3 p)	CD Logroñés	2–0	1–3
Linares CF	3–3 (3–1 p)	Real Oviedo	1–1	2–2

Bye: UE Figueres, Racing de Santander

== Round of 32 ==
Team 1	Agg.	Team 2	1st leg	2nd leg
Eldense	1–3	Betis	0–0	1–3
Linares	0–3	Athletic Bilbao	0–2	0–1
Valencia	0–3	Sevilla	0–0	0–3
Hércules	3–4	Español	2–3	1–1
Valladolid	1–1 (4–5 p)	Osasuna	0–0	1–1
Figueres	1–1 (2–4 p)	Sabadell	1–0	0–1
Sestao	0–3	Real Madrid	0–0	0–3
Cartagena	1–2	Real Sociedad	1–0	0–2
Castellón	3–0	Racing de Santander	1–0	2–0
Barcelona	5–0	Murcia	2–0	3–0
Barcelona Atletic	0–5	Sporting de Gijón	0–2	0–3
Castilla	4–1	Mallorca	2–0	2–1
Celta de Vigo	1–0	Zaragoza	1–0	0–0
Elche	2–2 (6–7 p)	Atlético Madrid	1–0	1–2
Recreativo de Huelva	1–3	Cádiz	1–3	0–0
Rayo Vallecano	2–4	Las Palmas	1–3	1–1

=== First leg ===
11 November 1987	Eldense	0–0	Betis	Elda
		Report (in Spanish)		Stadium: Municipal; Referee: Mazorra Freire

11 November 1987	Linares	0–2	Athletic Bilbao	Linares
		Report (in Spanish)	Sarabia 4'; Uralde 54'	Stadium: Linarejos; Referee: Soriano Aladrén

11 November 1987	Valencia	0–0	Sevilla	Valencia
		Report (in Spanish)		Stadium: Luis Casanova; Referee: Calvo Córdova

11 November 1987	Hércules	2–3	Español	Alicante
	Herbera 50'; Álvarez 72'	Report (in Spanish)	Lauridsen 40'; Orejuela 61'; Losada 66'	Stadium: José Rico Pérez; Referee: Martín Navarrete

11 November 1987	Valladolid	0–0	Osasuna	Valladolid
		Report (in Spanish)		Stadium: Nuevo José Zorrilla; Attendance: 3,000; Referee: Taboada Soto

11 November 1987	Figueras	1–0	Sabadell	Figueras
	Forcadell 69'	Report (in Spanish)		Stadium: Vilatenim; Attendance: 8,000; Referee: Urío Velázquez

11 November 1987	Sestao	0–0	Real Madrid	Sestao
		Report (in Spanish)		Stadium: Las Llanas; Attendance: 11,000; Referee: García de Loza

11 November 1987	Castellón	1–0	Racing de Santander	Castellón de la Plana
	Manchado 15'	Report (in Spanish)		Stadium: Nou Estadi Castalia; Referee: Vico Díaz

11 November 1987	Barcelona	2–0	Murcia	Barcelona
	Víctor 79'; Clos 89'	Report (in Spanish)		Stadium: Camp Nou; Attendance: 25,000; Referee: Peraita Ibáñez

11 November 1987	Castilla	2–0	Mallorca	Madrid
	Aldana 11'; Vílchez 42' (pen.)	Report (in Spanish)		Stadium: Santiago Bernabéu; Attendance: 21,000; Referee: Pérez Sánchez

11 November 1987	Celta de Vigo	1–0	Zaragoza	Vigo
	Lucas 74'	Report (in Spanish)		Stadium: Balaídos; Attendance: 12,000; Referee: Ramos Marcos

11 November 1987	Recreativo de Huelva	1–3	Cádiz	Huelva
20:15	Alzugaray 88'	Report (in Spanish)	Mágico González 38', 90' (pen.); Benito 58'	Stadium: Colombino; Referee: Jiménez Muñoz de Morales

11 November 1987	Rayo Vallecano	1–3	Las Palmas	Madrid
	Soto 1'	Report (in Spanish)	Contreras 25'; Narciso 28', 65'	Stadium: Vallecas; Referee: Bayarri Ribelles

12 November 1987	Elche	1–0	Atlético Madrid	Elche
	Bračun 12'	Report (in Spanish)		Stadium: Martínez Valero; Attendance: 20,000; Referee: Andújar Oliver

12 November 1987	Barcelona Atletic	0–2	Sporting de Gijón	Barcelona
		Report (in Spanish)	Villa 13'; Zurdi 16'	Stadium: Mini Estadi; Attendance: 6,000; Referee: Marín López

3 December 1987	Cartagena	1–0	Real Sociedad	Torre-Pacheco
	Paco 84'	Report (in Spanish)		Stadium: Polideportivo de Torre Pacheco; Attendance: 5,000; Referee: Sánchez Moreno

=== Second leg ===
24 November 1987	Las Palmas	1–1	Rayo Vallecano	Las Palmas
	Alexis 14'	Report (in Spanish)	Botella 30'	Stadium: Insular; Attendance: 2,000; Referee: Martín Navarrete

25 November 1987	Real Madrid	3–0	Sestao	Madrid
	Tendillo 25'; Santillana 74'; Míchel 84' (pen.)	Report (in Spanish)		Stadium: Santiago Bernabéu; Attendance: 15,000; Referee: Díaz Agüero

2 December 1987	Betis	3–1	Eldense	Seville
	Melenas 42'; Chano 57'; Gail 84'	Report (in Spanish)	Villena 70'	Stadium: Ramón Sánchez Pizjuán; Attendance: 5,000; Referee: Riera Morro

2 December 1987	Athletic Bilbao	1–0	Linares	Bilbao
	Liceranzu 57'	Report (in Spanish)		Stadium: San Mamés; Attendance: 6,000; Referee: Díaz Vega

2 December 1987	Sevilla	3–0	Valencia	Seville
	Ramón 5'; Moisés 61'; Bengoechea 84'	Report (in Spanish)		Stadium: Ramón Sánchez Pizjuán; Attendance: 5,000; Referee: Pérez Sánchez

2 December 1987	Español	1–1	Hércules	Barcelona
	Iñaki 42'	Report (in Spanish)	Ramos 24'	Stadium: Sarrià; Attendance: 6,000; Referee: Urío Velázquez

2 December 1987	Osasuna	1–1 (a.e.t.) (5–4 p)	Valladolid	Pamplona
	Goikoetxea 90'	Report (in Spanish)	Endika 62'	Stadium: El Sadar; Attendance: 14,000; Referee: Soriano Aladrén
	Penalties
	Goikoetxea (penalty scored); Arozarena (penalty scored); De Luis (penalty scored); Martín (penalty scored); Pizo Gómez (penalty scored)

2 December 1987	Sabadell	1–0 (a.e.t.) (4–2 p)	Figueras	Sabadell
	Lino 63'	Report (in Spanish)		Stadium: Nova Creu Alta; Attendance: 8,000; Referee: Peraita Ibáñez
	Penalties
			Forcadell (penalty scored); Arturo (penalty missed); Valentín (penalty missed)

2 December 1987	Racing de Santander	0–2	Castellón	Santander
		Report (in Spanish)	Saura 21'; Raúl 59'	Stadium: El Sardinero; Attendance: 7,000; Referee: González Lecue

2 December 1987	Murcia	0–3	Barcelona	Murcia
		Report (in Spanish)	Víctor 14'; Carrasco 33'; Schuster 50'	Stadium: La Condomina; Attendance: 18,000; Referee: Sánchez Arminio

2 December 1987	Sporting de Gijón	3–0	Barcelona Atletic	Gijón
	Juanma 19'; Eloy 27'; Cabrera 87'	Report (in Spanish)		Stadium: El Molinón; Attendance: 11,000; Referee: Pérez Sánchez

2 December 1987	Mallorca	1–2	Castilla	Palma de Mallorca
	Bonet 33'	Report (in Spanish)	Guillermo 3'; Aldana 71'	Stadium: Luis Sitjar; Attendance: 5,000; Referee: Albert Giménez

2 December 1987	Zaragoza	0–0	Celta de Vigo	Zaragoza
		Report (in Spanish)		Stadium: La Romareda; Attendance: 10,000; Referee: Mazorra Freire

2 December 1987	Atlético Madrid	2–1 (a.e.t.) (7–6 p)	Elche	Madrid
	López Ufarte 24'; Landáburu 34'	Report (in Spanish)	Sixto 13'	Stadium: Vicente Calderón; Attendance: 2,500; Referee: Caetano Bueno
	Penalties
	Marina (penalty scored); Futre (penalty scored); Salinas (penalty scored); Parra (penalty scored); Landáburu (penalty missed); Pedraza (penalty missed); Sergio (penalty scored); Juan Carlos (penalty scored); Arteche (penalty scored)		(penalty scored) Del Barrio; (penalty scored) Bračun; (penalty scored) Robi; (penalty scored) Cepeda; (penalty missed) Isidro; (penalty missed) Boria; (penalty scored) Sánchez; (penalty scored) Company; (penalty missed) Javi

2 December 1987	Cádiz	0–0	Recreativo de Huelva	Cádiz
		Report (in Spanish)		Stadium: Ramón de Carranza; Attendance: 11,000; Referee: Pajares Paz

9 December 1987	Real Sociedad	2–0	Cartagena	San Sebastián
	Santi Bakero 3'; José Mari Bakero 18'	Report (in Spanish)		Stadium: Atotxa; Attendance: 10,000; Referee: Marín López

== Round of 16 ==
Team 1	Agg.	Team 2	1st leg	2nd leg
Español	1–4	Barcelona	1–3	0–1
Osasuna	3–0	Celta de Vigo	2–0	1–0
Sevilla	2–3	Castellón	1–1	1–2
Atlético Madrid	3–1	Las Palmas	0–0	3–1
Sporting de Gijón	0–4	Real Sociedad	0–0	0–4
Castilla	3–3 (7–6 p)	Athletic Bilbao	2–1	1–2
Cádiz	3–5	Real Madrid	1–1	2–4
Sabadell	1–0	Betis	0–0	1–0

=== First leg ===
15 December 1987	Castilla	2–1	Athletic Bilbao	Madrid
21:00 CET	Vílchez 50'; Gay 87'	Report (in Spanish)	Uralde 56'	Stadium: Santiago Bernabéu; Attendance: 20,000; Referee: Paz García

16 December 1987	Español	1–3	Barcelona	Barcelona
21:15 CET	Soler 12'	Report (in Spanish)	Carrasco 20'; Víctor 32'; Roberto 90'	Stadium: Sarrià; Attendance: 30,000; Referee: Soriano Aladrén

16 December 1987	Osasuna	2–0	Celta de Vigo	Pamplona
20:30 CET	Ibáñez 37'; Pizo Gómez 53'	Report (in Spanish)		Stadium: El Sadar; Attendance: 12,000; Referee: Andújar Oliver

16 December 1987	Atlético Madrid	0–0	Las Palmas	Madrid
21:00 CET		Report (in Spanish)		Stadium: Vicente Calderón; Attendance: 8,000; Referee: Sánchez-Molina Soto

16 December 1987	Sporting de Gijón	0–0	Real Sociedad	Gijón
20:30 CET		Report (in Spanish)		Stadium: El Molinón; Referee: Ramos Marcos

16 December 1987	Cádiz	1–1	Real Madrid	Cádiz
21:00 CET	José 75'	Report (in Spanish)	Hugo Sánchez 9'	Stadium: Ramón de Carranza; Attendance: 18,000; Referee: Taboada Soto

16 December 1987	Sabadell	0–0	Betis	Sabadell
21:15 CET		Report (in Spanish)		Stadium: Nova Creu Alta; Attendance: 4,000; Referee: Díaz Agüero

30 December 1987	Sevilla	1–1	Castellón	Seville
	Moisés 9'	Report (in Spanish)	Vujkov 3'	Stadium: Ramón Sánchez Pizjuán; Attendance: 10,000; Referee: Valdés Sánchez

=== Second leg ===
6 January 1988	Barcelona	1–0	Español	Barcelona
	Schuster 69'	Report (in Spanish)		Stadium: Camp Nou; Attendance: 20,000; Referee: Sánchez Arminio

6 January 1988	Celta de Vigo	0–1	Osasuna	Vigo
17:00		Report (in Spanish)	Robinson 56'	Stadium: Balaídos; Attendance: 2,000; Referee: Jiménez Muñoz de Morales

6 January 1988	Castellón	2–1	Sevilla	Castellón de la Plana
17:30	Ximet 51'; García Hernández 63'	Report (in Spanish)	Salguero 77'	Stadium: Nou Estadi Castalia; Attendance: 8,000; Referee: Pérez Sánchez

6 January 1988	Las Palmas	1–3	Atlético Madrid	Las Palmas
20:00	Dajka 37'	Report (in Spanish)	Eusebio 46'; Parra 67' (pen.); Salinas 86'	Stadium: Insular; Attendance: 13,000; Referee: Alfonso Álvarez

6 January 1988	Real Sociedad	4–0	Sporting de Gijón	San Sebastián
17:00	Begiristain 23'; Bakero 50', 76', 88'	Report (in Spanish)		Stadium: Atotxa; Attendance: 16,000; Referee: Enríquez Negreira

6 January 1988	Athletic Bilbao	2–1 (a.e.t.) (6–7 p)	Castilla	Bilbao
17:00	Sarabia 61'; Urtubi 104'	Report (in Spanish)	Hurtado 97'	Stadium: San Mamés; Attendance: 30,000; Referee: Pajares Paz
	Penalties
	Urtubi (penalty missed); Uralde (penalty scored); Sarriugarte (penalty scored); Joseba Agirre (penalty scored); Sarabia (penalty scored); Ayarza (penalty scored); Gallego (penalty scored); Andrinúa (penalty missed)		(penalty scored) Aragón; (penalty missed) José María; (penalty scored) León; (penalty scored) Gay; (penalty scored) Mandiá; (penalty scored) Salmerón; (penalty scored) Hurtado; (penalty scored) Aldana

6 January 1988	Real Madrid	4–2	Cádiz	Madrid
17:30	Hugo Sánchez 46'; Santillana 76', 88'; Llorente 90'	Report (in Spanish)	Francis 60'; Carmelo 72'	Stadium: Santiago Bernabéu; Attendance: 30,000; Referee: Urízar Azpitarte

6 January 1988	Betis	0–1	Sabadell	Seville
		Report (in Spanish)	Pinki 51'	Stadium: Benito Villamarín; Attendance: 10,000; Referee: Benavente Garasa

== Quarter-finals ==
Team 1	Agg.	Team 2	1st leg	2nd leg
Atlético Madrid	3–4	Real Sociedad	2–1	1–3
Castellón	1–3	Barcelona	1–1	0–2
Castilla	1–3	Osasuna	0–0	1–3
Sabadell	3–4	Real Madrid	3–2	0–2

=== First leg ===
13 January 1988	Sabadell	3–2	Real Madrid	Sabadell
	Vinyals 66'; Sala 75'; Villarroya 76'	Report (in Spanish)	Hugo Sánchez 9'; Martín Vázquez 32'	Stadium: Nova Creu Alta; Attendance: 9,000; Referee: Martín Navarrete

13 January 1988	Castellón	1–1	Barcelona	Castellón de la Plana
	Mel 38'	Report (in Spanish)	Víctor 14'	Stadium: Nou Estadi Castalia; Attendance: 16,000; Referee: Andújar Oliver

13 January 1988	Castilla	0–0	Osasuna	Madrid
		Report (in Spanish)		Stadium: Santiago Bernabéu; Attendance: 30,000; Referee: Calvo Córdova

13 January 1988	Atlético Madrid	2–1	Real Sociedad	Madrid
	Futre 12'; Landáburu 57'	Report (in Spanish)	Begiristain 82'	Stadium: Vicente Calderón; Attendance: 45,000; Referee: Ramos Marco

=== Second leg ===
20 January 1988	Real Madrid	2–0 (a.e.t.)	Sabadell	Madrid
	Santillana 78'; Paco Llorente 94'	Report (in Spanish)		Stadium: Santiago Bernabéu; Referee: Taboada Soto

20 January 1988	Osasuna	3–1	Castilla	Pamplona
	Robinson 60', 63', 81'	Report (in Spanish)	Hurtado 69'	Stadium: El Sadar; Referee: Pes Pérez

20 January 1988	Barcelona	2–0	Castellón	Barcelona
	Roberto 33'; Schuster 65'	Report (in Spanish)		Stadium: Camp Nou; Referee: Merino González

21 January 1988	Real Sociedad	3–1	Atlético Madrid	San Sebastián
20:00 CET	Loren 4'; Begiristain 10'; López Rekarte 75'	Report (in Spanish)	Salinas 85'	Stadium: Atotxa; Referee: Sánchez Arminio

== Semi-finals ==
Team 1	Agg.	Team 2	1st leg	2nd leg
Osasuna	0–3	Barcelona	0–0	0–3
Real Sociedad	5–0	Real Madrid	1–0	4–0

=== First leg ===
11 February 1988	Real Sociedad	1–0	Real Madrid	San Sebastián
20:15 CET	Bakero 9'	Report (in Spanish)		Stadium: Atotxa; Attendance: 25,000; Referee: Ramos Marcos

11 February 1988	Osasuna	0–0	Barcelona	Pamplona
20:30 CET		Report (in Spanish)		Stadium: El Sadar; Referee: Soriano Aladrén

=== Second leg ===
17 February 1988	Barcelona	3–0	Osasuna	Barcelona
21:15 CET	Clos 23'; Lineker 42', 84'	Report (in Spanish)		Stadium: Camp Nou; Attendance: 70,000; Referee: Urízar Azpitarte

18 February 1988	Real Madrid	0–4	Real Sociedad	Madrid
20:30 CET		Report (in Spanish)	Górriz 54'; Bakero 65', 71'; Begiristain 66'	Stadium: Santiago Bernabéu; Referee: Enríquez Negreira

== Final ==
31 March 1988
20:30 CET

FC Barcelona	1–0	Real Sociedad
Alexanko 61'	Report (in Spanish)

Madrid
Stadium: Santiago Bernabéu
Attendance: 70,000
Referee: Ramos Marcos (Castile and León)

Copa del Rey
1987–88 winners
FC Barcelona
21st title
