= 1985 Supercopa de España =

Atlético Madrid	Barcelona
3	2
- on aggregate

First leg
Atlético Madrid	Barcelona
3	1
- Date: 9 October 1985
- Venue: Vicente Calderón, Madrid
- Referee: Miguel Ángel Marín López

Second leg
Barcelona	Atlético Madrid
1	0
- Date: 30 November 1985
- Venue: Camp Nou, Barcelona
- Referee: Ildefonso Urizar Azpitarte

The 1985 Supercopa de España was a two-legged Spanish football match between Barcelona (winners of the league) and Atlético Madrid (cup winners); it was played on 9 October and 30 October 1985, with the latter team winning 3–2 on aggregate.

== Match details ==
=== First leg ===
9 October 1985
21:30 CET

Atlético Madrid	3–1	Barcelona
Cabrera 40'; Ruiz 52' da Silva 76'		Clos 31'

Vicente Calderón Stadium, Madrid
Referee: Miguel Ángel Marín López

Atlético Madrid	Barcelona

GK	1	(Argentina) Ubaldo Fillol
DF	2	(Spain) Tomás
DF	4	(Spain) Juan Carlos Arteche	(yellow card) 74'
DF	5	(Spain) Miguel Ángel Ruiz (c)
DF	3	(Spain) Clemente
MF	7	(Spain) Roberto Marina		(substituted off) 62'
MF	10	(Spain) Jesús Landáburu
MF	6	(Spain) Quique Setién
MF	8	(Spain) Quique Ramos
FW	9	(Argentina) Mario Cabrera
FW	11	(Spain) Juan José Rubio		(substituted off) 71'
Substitutes:
MF		(Spain) Julio Prieto		(substituted on) 62'
FW	15	(Uruguay) Jorge da Silva		(substituted on) 71'
Manager:
(Spain) Luis Aragonés

GK	1	(Spain) Amador
DF		(Spain) Gerardo	(yellow card) 75'
DF		(Spain) Migueli
DF	6	(Spain) José Ramón Alexanko (c)
DF		(Spain) Julio Alberto
MF		(Spain) Ramón María Calderé	(yellow card) 54'
MF		(Spain) Josep Moratalla
MF		(Spain) Víctor	(yellow card) 38'
MF		(Spain) Marcos
FW		(Spain) Juan Carlos Pérez Rojo
FW	7	(Spain) Paco Clos	(yellow card) 37'
Manager:
(England) Terry Venables

=== Second leg ===
30 October 1985
21:15 CET

Barcelona	1–0	Atlético Madrid
Alexanko 33'

Camp Nou, Barcelona
Referee: Ildefonso Urízar Azpitarte

Barcelona	Atlético Madrid

GK	1	(Spain) Urruti
DF		(Spain) Manolo
DF		(Spain) Josep Moratalla
DF		(Spain) José Ramón Alexanko		(substituted off) 46'
DF		(Spain) Julio Alberto
MF		(Spain) Víctor Muñoz
MF	8	(West Germany) Bernd Schuster (c)
MF		(Spain) Marcos	(yellow card) 56'
FW		(Spain) Francisco José Carrasco
FW		(Paraguay) Raúl Amarilla		(substituted off) 65'
FW		(Scotland) Steve Archibald
Substitutes:
DF		(Spain) Esteve Fradera		(substituted on) 46'
FW		(Spain) Pichi Alonso		(substituted on) 65'
Manager:
(England) Terry Venables

GK	1	(Spain) Ángel Mejías	(yellow card) 78'
DF	3	(Spain) Julio Prieto
DF	4	(Spain) Juan Carlos Arteche
DF	5	(Spain) Miguel Ángel Ruiz (c)
DF	2	(Spain) Tomás Reñones
MF	7	(Spain) Roberto Marina
MF	10	(Spain) Jesús Landáburu
MF	6	(Spain) Quique Setién		(substituted off) 46'
MF	8	(Spain) Quique Ramos
FW	9	(Argentina) Mario Cabrera
FW	11	(Uruguay) Jorge da Silva		(substituted off) 59'
Substitutes:
DF		(Spain) Clemente Villaverde		(substituted on) 46'
FW		(Spain) Juan José Rubio		(substituted on) 59'
Manager:
(Spain) Luis Aragonés

== See also ==
- 1985–86 La Liga
- 1985–86 Copa del Rey
- 1985–86 FC Barcelona season
