= 1985 Copa de la Liga =

Copa de la Liga
Tournament details
- Country: Spain
- Teams: 21

Final positions
- Champions: Real Madrid
- Runners-up: Atlético Madrid

Tournament statistics
- Matches played: 42
- Goals scored: 140 (3.33 per match)
- Top goal scorer: (Spain) Juan José Rubio (6)

The 1985 Copa de la Liga was the third year of Copa de la Liga. The competition started on April 11, 1985, and concluded on June 15, 1985. Due to time constraints, saturation and club pressure, the Copa de la Liga only lasted four years from its introduction in 1982, being cancelled in 1986.

== Format ==
The Copa de la Liga was played by the 18 teams of the 1984-85 La Liga and the 3 winners of 1984 Copa de la Liga of Segunda División, Segunda División B and Tercera División. All rounds were played over two legs. The team that had the higher aggregate score over the two legs progressed to the next round. The 1984-85 Copa del Rey winner was exempt until the quarter-finals and the 1984-85 Copa del Rey quarter-final losers were exempt until the second round.

=== La Liga ===
- Athletic Bilbao
- Atlético Madrid
- FC Barcelona
- Real Betis
- Elche CF
- RCD Español
- Hércules CF
- Málaga CF
- CA Osasuna
- Racing Santander
- Real Madrid
- Real Murcia
- Real Zaragoza
- Real Sociedad
- Real Valladolid
- Sevilla CF
- Sporting Gijon
- Valencia CF

=== Other teams ===
- CD Castellón, winner of 1984 Copa de la Liga of Segunda División.
- Gimnàstic de Tarragona, winner of 1984 Copa de la Liga of Segunda División B group I.
- CD Antequerano, winner of 1984 Copa de la Liga of Segunda División B group II.
- CD Tudelano, winner of 1984 Copa de la Liga of Tercera División.

== First round ==
First leg: 11 April 1985. Second leg: 17, 18, 21 and 24 May 1985.

Team 1	Agg.	Team 2	1st leg	2nd leg
Valencia CF	3–2	Racing Santander	1–2	2–0
Sevilla FC	3–0	Gimnàstic de Tarragona	2–0	1–0
Real Murcia	9–1	Hércules CF	7–0	2–1
Real Valladolid	12–4	CD Antequerano	8–0	4–4
Málaga CF	3–2	CA Osasuna	1–0	2–2
CD Tudelano	1–5	RCD Español	0–4	1–1
Elche CF	2–5	CD Castellón	2–2	0–3

- Bye: Athletic Bilbao, Atlético Madrid, FC Barcelona, Real Betis, Real Madrid, Real Zaragoza, Real Sociedad and Sporting Gijon.

== Second round ==
First leg: 1, 4 and 5 May 1985. Second leg: 7 and 9 May 1985.

Team 1	Agg.	Team 2	1st leg	2nd leg
FC Barcelona	4–2	Real Sociedad	2–0	2–2
Real Valladolid	3–4	Real Zaragoza	2–3	1–1
Real Betis	4–1	Valencia CF	4–0	0–1
Atlético Madrid	9–0	Real Murcia	4–0	5–0
CD Castellón	2–4	RCD Español	1–3	1–1
Athletic Bilbao	4–2	Málaga CF	3–2	1–0
Sporting Gijon	3–1	Sevilla CF	1–1	2–0

- Bye: Real Madrid.

== Quarter-finals ==
First leg: 11 and 12 May 1985. Second leg: 18 and 19 May 1985.

Team 1	Agg.	Team 2	1st leg	2nd leg
FC Barcelona	3–3 (p)	Real Madrid	2–2	1–1
Sporting Gijon	3–2	Real Zaragoza	2–0	1–2
RCD Español	4–1	Athletic Bilbao	3–0	1–1
Atlético Madrid	4–3	Real Betis	3–1	1–2

== Semi-finals ==
First leg: 30 May 1985. Second leg: 2 June 1985.

Team 1	Agg.	Team 2	1st leg	2nd leg
Sporting Gijon	3–4	Real Madrid	3–1	0–3
Atlético Madrid	5–3	RCD Español	5–1	0–2

== Final ==
=== First leg ===
5 June 1985

Atlético Madrid	3–2	Real Madrid
Rubio 10'; Arteche 57'; Cabrera 59'		Pineda 48'; Santillana 79'

Vicente Calderón, Madrid
Attendance: 40,000
Referee: Urío Velázquez

=== Second leg ===
15 June 1985

Real Madrid	2–0	Atlético Madrid
Stielike 23'; Míchel 62'

Santiago Bernabéu, Madrid
Attendance: 65,000
Referee: Crespo Aurré

Copa de la Liga
1985 Winners
Real Madrid
1st title
