= 1986 Copa de la Liga =

Copa de la Liga
Tournament details
- Country: Spain
- Teams: 21

Final positions
- Champions: FC Barcelona
- Runners-up: Real Betis

Tournament statistics
- Matches played: 42
- Goals scored: 127 (3.02 per match)
- Top goal scorer(s): (Chile) Jorge Aravena (Spain) Pedro Uralde (6)

The 1986 Copa de la Liga was the fourth and last edition of Copa de la Liga. The competition started on May 1, 1986, and concluded on June 14, 1986. Due to time constraints, saturation and club pressure, the Copa de la Liga only lasted four years since 1982, being cancelled in 1986.

== Format ==
The Copa de la Liga was played by the 18 teams of the 1985-86 La Liga and the 3 winners of the 1985 Copa de la Liga of Segunda División, Segunda División B and Tercera División. All rounds were played over two legs. The team that had the higher aggregate score over the two legs progressed to the next round.

=== La Liga ===
- Athletic Bilbao
- Atlético Madrid
- FC Barcelona
- Real Betis
- Cádiz CF
- Celta de Vigo
- RCD Español
- Hércules CF
- UD Las Palmas
- CA Osasuna
- Racing Santander
- Real Madrid
- Real Zaragoza
- Real Sociedad
- Real Valladolid
- Sevilla CF
- Sporting Gijon
- Valencia CF

=== Other teams ===
- Real Oviedo, winner of 1985 Copa de la Liga of Segunda División.
- Sestao Sport Club, winner of 1985 Copa de la Liga of Segunda División B group I.
- Albacete Balompié, winner of 1985 Copa de la Liga of Segunda División B group II.
- UB Conquense, winner of 1985 Copa de la Liga of Tercera División.

== First round ==
First leg: 1 and 4 May 1986. Second leg: 8 and 9 May 1986.

Team 1	Agg.	Team 2	1st leg	2nd leg
CA Osasuna	4–5	Real Betis	2–2	2–3
Cádiz CF	0–1	Sporting Gijon	0–1	0–0
Real Zaragoza	4–1	Hércules CF	2–1	2–0
UB Conquense	3–5	Valencia CF	2–2	1–3
Celta de Vigo	3–4	RCD Español	3–2	0–2
Real Sociedad	4–3	Athletic Bilbao	2–1	2–2
Sestao Sport Club	3–2	UD Las Palmas	2–0	1–2
Real Oviedo	(p) 3–3	Racing Santander	3–0	0–3
Real Valladolid	8–5	Albacete Balompié	5–1	3–4

- Bye: Atlético Madrid, FC Barcelona, Real Madrid and Sevilla FC.

== Second round ==
First leg: 11 and 14 May 1986. Second leg: 18 and 21 May 1986.

Team 1	Agg.	Team 2	1st leg	2nd leg
FC Barcelona	6–2	Real Madrid	2–2	4–0
Valencia CF	6–3	RCD Español	5–2	1–1
Real Oviedo	2–5	Real Sociedad	2–1	0–4
Atlético Madrid	4–3	Real Valladolid	3–3	1–0
Sevilla CF	0–1	Sestao Sport Club	0–0	0–1

- Bye: Real Betis, Real Zaragoza and Sporting Gijon.

== Quarter-finals ==
First leg: 24 and 25 May 1986. Second leg: 29 May 1986.

Team 1	Agg.	Team 2	1st leg	2nd leg
FC Barcelona	3–2	Sporting de Gijón	1–0	2–2
Real Sociedad	2–3	Real Zaragoza	1–0	1–3
Valencia CF	2–4	Real Betis	1–2	1–2
Sestao Sport Club	3–4	Atlético Madrid	3–2	0–2

== Semi-finals ==
First leg: 4 June 1986. Second leg: 8 June 1986.

Team 1	Agg.	Team 2	1st leg	2nd leg
Real Zaragoza	1–4	Real Betis	1–2	0–2
Atlético Madrid	1–2	FC Barcelona	0–1	1–1

== Final ==
=== First leg ===
11 June 1986

Real Betis	1–0	FC Barcelona
Calderón 16'

Benito Villamarín, Seville
Referee: Joaquín Ramos Marco

Real Betis
Barcelona

=== Second leg ===
14 June 1986

FC Barcelona	2–0	Real Betis
Amarilla 9'; Alexanko 40' (pen.)

Camp Nou, Barcelona
Referee: Ildefonso Urizar Azpitarte

Barcelona
Real Betis

Copa de la Liga
1986 Winners
FC Barcelona
2nd title
