= Walter Waalderbos =

Dutch association football player

Personal information
- Date of birth: 21 July 1951 (age 75)
- Place of birth: Netherlands
- Position: Defender

Senior career*
Years	Team	Apps	(Gls)
1975–1977	Go Ahead Eagles	12	(2)
1977–1985	FC Groningen	228	(26)
1985–1987	FC Emmen	64	(4)
- * Club domestic league appearances and goals

Walter Waalderbos (born 21 July 1951) is a retired Dutch footballer who played as a defender.
