= Ismael Urtubi =

Spanish footballer and manager

Personal information
- Full name: Ismael Urtubi Aróstegui
- Date of birth: 24 May 1961 (age 65)
- Place of birth: Barakaldo, Spain
- Height: 1.75 m (5 ft 9 in)
- Position: Midfielder

Youth career
- Athletic Bilbao

Senior career*
Years	Team	Apps	(Gls)
1978–1981	Bilbao Athletic	41	(1)
1979	→ Mungia (loan)	20	(0)
1980–1992	Athletic Bilbao	209	(28)
1981	→ Mallorca (loan)	7	(0)
1982	→ Margaritense (loan)		
1992–1994	Balmaseda	?	(8)
1994–1995	Zalla		
Total		277+	(37+)

International career
1984–1985	Spain	2	(0)

Managerial career
- 2001–2004: Zalla
- 2005–2006: Mirandés
- 2007–2008: Zalla
- 2011–2012: Zalla
- * Club domestic league appearances and goals

Ismael Urtubi Aróstegui (born 24 May 1961) is a Spanish former professional footballer who played as a left midfielder.

An accomplished penalty kick taker, his entire career was spent with Athletic Bilbao for whom he appeared in more than 275 official matches, winning four major honours with the club including two La Liga championships.

== Club career ==
Born in Barakaldo, Biscay, Urtubi grew in Athletic Bilbao's youth system, Lezama. He made his debut with the first team on 2 November 1980, playing two minutes in a 1–1 away draw against Sporting de Gijón in what would be his only La Liga appearance of the season.

In the summer of 1981, Urtubi moved to the Balearic Islands for his compulsory military service, spending a few months playing with RCD Mallorca in the Segunda División and finishing the campaign with amateurs CD Margaritense, in both cases on loan. Upon his return, he wasted no time making an impact in the Lions' main squad, totalling 13 goals in 62 games as the Basques won back-to-back national championships and claiming the double in the latter season.

In the final of the 1984–85 Copa del Rey, against Atlético Madrid, referee Miguel Pérez awarded the opposition a penalty kick after a controversial handball by Urtubi; Athletic eventually lost it 2–1. In the next league campaign the side finished in third position, with the player missing his first penalty ever, against Hércules CF, and manager Javier Clemente was also dismissed at the end of five highly successful years.

Urtubi continued to be an undisputed starter with the following coaches, José Ángel Iribar and Howard Kendall, with Athletic Bilbao finishing 13th and fourth, respectively, and reaching the semi-finals of the domestic cup in 1987, bowing out to neighbouring Real Sociedad. On 15 February 1989, during a cup match against Real Valladolid, he suffered a severe injury in his left knee (posterior cruciate ligament, external and internal meniscus) but eventually recovered fully, although he later suffered a relapse.

In 1989–90, manager Txetxu Rojo, a former Athletic player and assistant coach during Kendall's spell, suggested Urtubi gained match fitness with the reserves. After the player refused he would make no more official appearances, but saw his importance in the squad increase when Clemente returned in June 1990 as elections at the club brought a new chairman.

On 16 March 1991, following a 2–0 loss at CD Castellón – in the previous fixture, Athletic had lost 6–0 at home against FC Barcelona – Clemente was fired, in what was Urtubi's last match in the Spanish top division. In 1991–92 his output consisted of one cup tie against Deportivo Alavés, scoring his side's goal through a penalty to help to a 1–1 draw in Álava and leaving with 278 games and 37 goals to his credit.

Urtubi ended his career in 1995 at the age of 34, after playing amateur football with local sides SD Balmaseda FC and Zalla UC. He had his first coaching experience ten years later, leading CD Mirandés to second position in the Tercera División.

== International career ==
On 14 November 1984, Urtubi won the first of his two caps with Spain, starting in a 3–1 loss to Scotland for the 1986 FIFA World Cup qualifiers in Glasgow. Two months later, he replaced Barcelona's Julio Alberto in the dying minutes of a 3–1 friendly win over Finland in Valencia.

== Honours ==
Athletic Bilbao

- La Liga: 1982–83, 1983–84
- Copa del Rey: 1983–84
- Supercopa de España: 1984
