= Sixto Casabona =

Spanish footballer

Sixto
Personal information
- Full name: Sixto Arturo Casabona Martínez
- Date of birth: 8 January 1962
- Place of birth: Benagéber, Spain
- Date of death: 10 October 2004 (aged 42)
- Place of death: Alicante, Spain
- Height: 1.72 m (5 ft 7 1/2 in)
- Position: Forward

Youth career
- Valencia

Senior career*
Years	Team	Apps	(Gls)
1979–1984	Mestalla		
1984–1987	Valencia	53	(18)
1987–1989	Elche	54	(21)
1989–1991	Palamós	64	(15)
1991–1992	Cartagena	19	(4)
- * Club domestic league appearances and goals

Sixto Arturo Casabona Martínez (8 January 1962 – 10 October 2004), commonly known as Sixto, was a Spanish footballer who played as a forward.

== Career ==
Born in Benagéber, Valencia, Sixto began his career with Valencia's B team, Mestalla. On 9 September 1984, Sixto made his debut for Valencia, scoring a penalty in a 5–1 win against Espanyol. During his three seasons in Valencia's first team, Sixto scored 18 times, including a hat-trick against Celta Vigo on 8 September 1985, in 53 league games. In 1987, Sixto signed for Elche, winning promotion to La Liga in his first season with the club, scoring 20 goals in 34 appearances. The following season, Sixto made 20 appearances, scoring once. After a groin injury prevented more game time, Sixto terminated his contract with Elche at the end of the season, signing for Palamós. Sixto remained with Palamós for two seasons, signing for Cartagena in 1991, before his retirement a year later.
