= Edu Vílchez =

Spanish footballer and manager

Personal information
- Full name: Eduard Vílchez Ortiz
- Date of birth: 22 September 1967 (age 59)
- Place of birth: Sabadell, Spain
- Height: 1.73 m (5 ft 8 in)
- Position: Forward

Youth career
- Mercantil
- Real Madrid

Senior career*
Years	Team	Apps	(Gls)
1984–1989	Real Madrid B	75	(15)
1989–1990	Logroñés	10	(1)
1990–1991	Valladolid	25	(2)
1991–1992	Espanyol	4	(0)
1992–1994	Palamós	65	(8)
1994–1995	Elche	19	(1)
1995–2000	Palamós	147	(34)
2000–2001	Palafrugell	?	(19)
2001–2002	Peralada	25	(9)

International career
1985–1986	Spain U18	2	(1)

Managerial career
- 2002–2004: San Marcial
- 2004: Logroñés (youth)
- 2004–2005: Linares
- 2005–2006: Logroñés (youth)
- 2006–2007: Los Barrios
- 2007–2008: Peralada
- 2009–2010: Linense
- 2010–2011: Peralada
- 2012–2013: Palamós
- 2013: Olot
- 2014–2016: Figueres
- 2017: Pobla Mafumet (assistant)
- 2017: Pobla Mafumet (interim)
- 2018–2020: Extremadura (assistant)
- 2019: Extremadura (interim)
- * Club domestic league appearances and goals

Eduard 'Edu' Vílchez Ortiz (born 22 September 1967) is a Spanish retired footballer who played as a forward, and is a manager.

== Club career ==
Born in Sabadell, Barcelona, Catalonia, Vílchez graduated from Real Madrid's youth setup. He made his professional debut on 9 September 1984, aged only 17, starting with the reserves in a 0–4 home loss against FC Barcelona B in the Segunda División championship. In the 1989 summer, after appearing regularly with Castilla, he joined CD Logroñés in La Liga.

Vílchez made his debut in the main category of Spanish football on 24 September 1989, starting in a 1–0 home win against Athletic Bilbao. He scored his first goal on 12 November, but in a 2–4 loss at FC Barcelona.

In September 1990 Vílchez moved to Real Valladolid, also in the top level. After appearing more regularly during the campaign, he signed for RCD Espanyol, but was used rarely by the latter.

In 1992 Vílchez joined Palamós CF, in the second level. He subsequently moved to Elche CF in Segunda División B in 1994, and resumed his career in the same division but also in Tercera División, representing Palamós, FC Palafrugell and CF Peralada; he retired with the latter in 2002, aged 35.

== Manager career ==
Vílchez began his managerial career at ACD San Marcial in 2002, narrowly avoiding relegation in his second season. On 27 July 2004 he was appointed Logroñés manager, but later joined the youth setup after the club's administrative relegation.

In November 2004 Vílchez was appointed at CD Linares, but left the club in January of the following year, after a bad run of results. He eventually returned to Logroñés in the 2005 summer, before joining UD Los Barrios in February 2006.

On 7 July 2007 Vílchez was appointed at the helm of Peralada. After one season he resigned, and signed for Real Balompédica Linense on 11 June 2009.

On 17 August 2010 Vílchez returned to Peralada, now in the regional leagues. On 31 October 2012 he was appointed Palamós manager, taking the club to a comfortable 12th place.

On 12 June 2013 Vílchez signed a contract with UE Olot, being effective on 1 July. He was sacked on 29 December, after a winless run of seven games.

On 16 October 2014 Vílchez was appointed UE Figueres manager. He left the club in 2016, and remained nearly a year without a club before being named CF Pobla de Mafumet's assistant on 22 June 2017; he also acted as the club's interim for some matches before being promoted to the first team as a part of Rodri's staff.

On 13 November 2018, Vílchez was named Rodri's assistant at Extremadura UD. The following 19 February, after the manager's dismissal, he took over the first team in an interim manner.

== Managerial statistics ==
As of 24 February 2019

Managerial record by team and tenure
Team	Nat	From	To	Record								Ref
Team	Nat	From	To	G	W	D	L	GF	GA	GD	Win %	Ref
San Marcial	(Spain)	1 July 2002	27 July 2004	80	26	19	35	80	114	−34	32.50	
Linares	(Spain)	7 December 2004	31 January 2005	6	0	3	3	1	5	−4	0.00	
Los Barrios	(Spain)	22 February 2006	7 July 2007	51	22	15	14	85	60	+25	43.14	
Peralada	(Spain)	7 July 2007	30 June 2008	38	14	7	17	44	55	−11	36.84	
Linense	(Spain)	11 June 2009	22 February 2010	27	11	9	7	34	22	+12	40.74	
Peralada	(Spain)	13 August 2010	30 June 2011	38	18	7	13	67	49	+18	47.37	
Palamós	(Spain)	31 October 2012	30 June 2013	30	10	12	8	40	36	+4	33.33	
Olot	(Spain)	1 July 2013	29 December 2013	21	6	4	11	24	36	−12	28.57	
Figueres	(Spain)	16 October 2014	20 May 2016	70	31	15	24	89	74	+15	44.29	
Pobla Mafumet (interim)	(Spain)	19 September 2017	23 October 2017	5	3	2	0	9	1	+8	60.00	
Extremadura (interim)	(Spain)	19 February 2019	27 February 2019	1	0	0	1	0	1	−1	0.00	
Total				367	141	93	133	473	453	+20	38.42	—
