= Jorge da Silva =

Uruguayan footballer (born 1961)

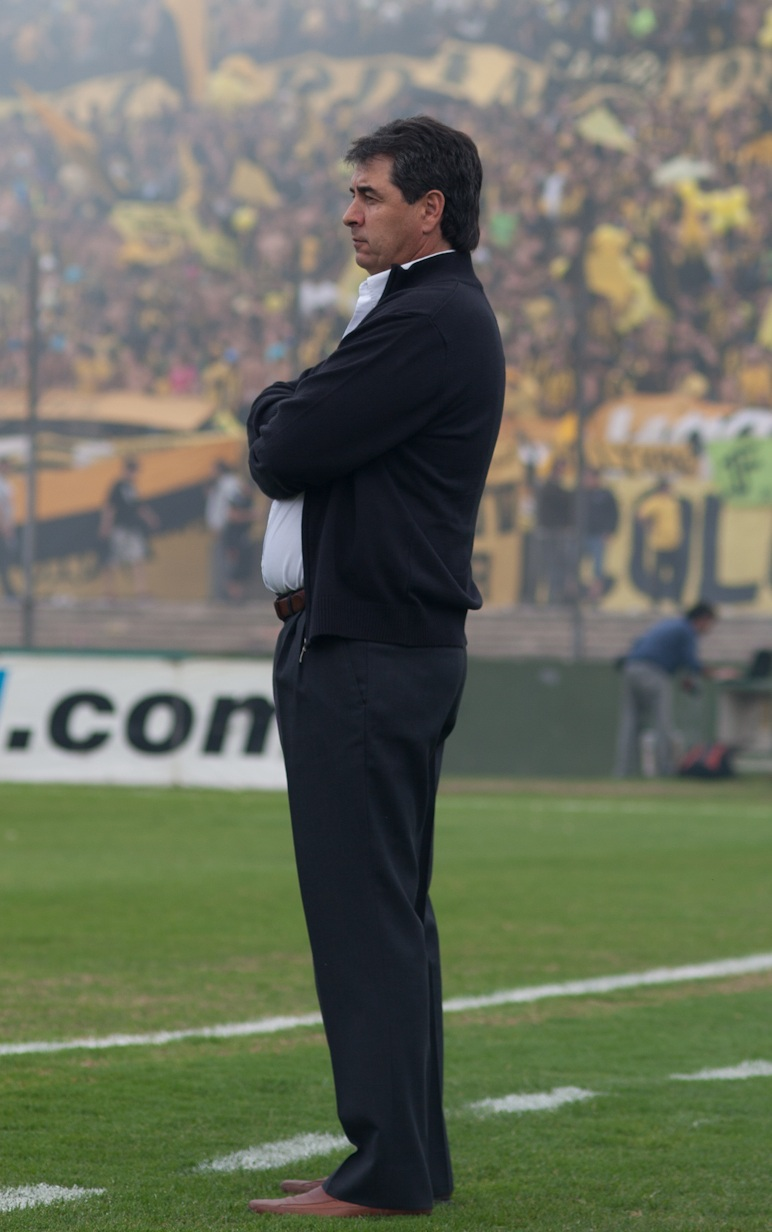
- Da Silva as manager of Peñarol in 2012

Personal information
- Full name: Jorge Orosmán da Silva Echeverrito
- Date of birth: 11 December 1961 (age 64)
- Place of birth: Montevideo, Uruguay
- Height: 1.82 m (6 ft 0 in)
- Position: Striker

Senior career*
Years	Team	Apps	(Gls)
1977	Fénix		
1977	Danubio		
1978–1982	Defensor		
1982–1985	Valladolid	62	(24)
1985–1987	Atlético Madrid	58	(21)
1987–1988	River Plate	58	(23)
1989–1990	Palestino		
1991–1994	América de Cali	172	(65)
1995	Millonarios	10	(3)
1995–1997	Defensor	43	(7)

International career
1982–1993	Uruguay	26	(6)

Managerial career
- 2000–2004: Uruguay (youth)
- 2001–2003: Uruguay (assistant)
- 2007–2009: Defensor
- 2009–2010: Al Nassr
- 2010–2011: Godoy Cruz
- 2012: Banfield
- 2012–2013: Peñarol
- 2013–2014: Baniyas
- 2014–2015: Al Nassr
- 2016: Peñarol
- 2017–2018: América de Cali
- 2018–2019: Defensor
- 2019–2022: Al-Ittihad Kalba
- 2023–2024: Muaither
- 2024–2025: América de Cali
- * Club domestic league appearances and goals

Jorge Orosmán da Silva Echeverrito (born 11 December 1961) is a Uruguayan football coach and a former player who played as a striker.

Nicknamed "Polilla" ("Moth" in English), he played professionally in four countries his own notwithstanding. In 2007, he embarked in a managerial career.

Da Silva played nearly 30 times with Uruguay, representing the nation at the 1986 World Cup and the 1993 Copa América tournaments.

== Playing career ==
=== Club ===
Born in Montevideo, da Silva made his debut in 1977 for C.A. Fénix. He then had a short spell with Danubio F.C. before joining Defensor Sporting in 1978.

Da Silva moved to Spain in late 1982, where he started playing for Real Valladolid and won the Pichichi Trophy (for the league's top scorer) in 1983–84 with 17 goals in 30 matches. He was only the second club player ever to win the award, and he also help add its first piece of silverware in the same season, the Copa de la Liga; he then represented Atlético Madrid after Hugo Sánchez left for Real Madrid, and netted 21 La Liga goals in two seasons, helping the team to the Copa del Rey and the Supercopa de España, both in 1985.

In 1987, da Silva returned to South America and signed for Club Atlético River Plate of Argentina. Two years later he went to Colombia to play for América de Cali, winning the Categoría Primera A twice during his four-year spell.

After another year in the country, with Millonarios FC, da Silva returned to his native land and re-joined Defensor Sporting, where he retired at nearly 36.

=== International ===
Having made his debut for Uruguay on 20 February 1982, in a 2–2 draw against South Korea for the Nehru Cup, da Silva went on to earn a further 25 caps. He was part of the squad at the 1986 FIFA World Cup, going scoreless in three matches (out of four) and being booked twice.

== Coaching career ==
Da Silva began working as a manager after retiring, being in charge of Uruguay's youths as well as acting as assistant to the senior team under Víctor Púa. In 2007 he returned to his last club, leading it to the Primera División title in 2008 and reaching the quarter-finals of the following year's Copa Libertadores; after two years, he moved to the Saudi Professional League with Al Nassr FC.

On 15 December 2010, Argentine Primera División team Godoy Cruz Antonio Tomba announced the hiring of da Silva as Omar Asad's replacement. On 27 February 2012 he left fellow league side Club Atlético Banfield to return to his country and join Peñarol, where he went on to conquer two accolades including the 2013 national championship.

On 19 June 2013, da Silva was appointed head coach at Baniyas Club in the UAE Pro League. He returned to Peñarol in January 2016 following a second spell with Al-Nassr, leaving the former on 9 October due to poor results.

Da Silva was announced as new head coach of América de Cali on 4 September 2017. He returned to the United Arab Emirates on 12 October 2019, signing with Al-Ittihad Kalba SC for one season.

== Honours ==
=== Player ===
Valladolid

- Copa de la Liga: 1984

Atlético Madrid

- Supercopa de España: 1985

América de Cali

- Categoría Primera A: 1990, 1992

=== Manager ===
Defensor Sporting

- Uruguayan Primera División: 2007–08; Apertura 2007, Clausura 2009

Peñarol

- Uruguayan Primera División: 2012–13; Apertura 2012

Al-Nassr

- Saudi Professional League: 2014–15

=== Individual ===
- Pichichi Trophy: 1983–84
