= Tomás Reñones =

Spanish footballer (born 1960)

Tomás
Personal information
- Full name: Pedro Tomás Reñones Crego
- Date of birth: 9 August 1960 (age 66)
- Place of birth: Compostela, Spain
- Height: 1.71 m (5 ft 7 in)
- Position: Right-back

Youth career
- Compostela

Senior career*
Years	Team	Apps	(Gls)
1978–1981	Compostela	81	(1)
1981–1984	Atlético Madrileño	78	(1)
1984–1996	Atlético Madrid	367	(2)
1996–1997	Marbella	30	(0)
1997–1998	San Pedro	21	(0)
Total		577	(4)

International career
1985–1989	Spain	19	(0)
- * Club domestic league appearances and goals

Pedro Tomás Reñones Crego (born 9 August 1960), known as Tomás as a player, is a Spanish former professional footballer who played as a right-back.

He was best known for his spell at Atlético Madrid, for which he played 12 seasons. He was also a regular for Spain in the late 80s, representing the nation in one World Cup and one European Championship.

== Club career ==
Tomás was born in Santiago de Compostela, Galicia. After three seasons with SD Compostela in his hometown he joined Atlético Madrid in 1981, first playing with the reserves. He made his La Liga debut in 1984–85 and never again lost his starting XI berth, going on to make 483 competitive appearances for the club.

On 25 May 1996, aged 35, Tomás took the field in the 83rd minute of his final game, a home fixture against Albacete Balompié. Although he appeared in only 12 matches during the campaign, he aided the Colchoneros to an historic double, and retired altogether in 1998 after two stints in the lower leagues.

Tomás returned to Atlético in July 2018, as part of the first-team staff.

== International career ==
Tomás earned 19 caps for the Spain national team, and was selected for the 1986 FIFA World Cup and UEFA Euro 1988 (playing a total of eight matches and completing seven). His debut came on 20 November 1985, in a 0–0 friendly against Austria in Zaragoza.

== Post-retirement ==
Reñones embraced a career in politics after retiring, being elected by the Liberal Independent Group – GIL, founded by longtime Atlético president Jesús Gil – to the Marbella city council.

After the local mayor was arrested due to a corruption scandal, he took office in 2006 as interim, but soon faced the same charges and was arrested by the Spanish police, as part of Operation Malaya.

== Honours ==
Atlético Madrid

- La Liga: 1995–96
- Copa del Rey: 1984–85, 1990–91, 1991–92, 1995–96
- Supercopa de España: 1985
- UEFA Cup Winners' Cup runner-up: 1985–86
