= Copa de la Liga =

- Founded: 1982
- Abolished: 1986
- Region: Spain
- Teams: 22
- Most championships: Barcelona (2 titles)

The Copa de la Liga (League Cup in Spanish) was a Spanish football tournament created in 1982.

Due to time constraints, saturation and club pressure, the competition only lasted four years, being cancelled in 1986. Winning the trophy helped two clubs to complete cup doubles: FC Barcelona with the Copa del Rey (1983) and Real Madrid with the UEFA Cup (1985). In all four finals, the team that played the second leg at home won the trophy.

== History ==
The League Cup was promoted by the president of FC Barcelona, Josep Lluís Núñez, in order to create a new competition that would generate new economic income for the clubs, both in terms of box office and television rights.

In 1986 the fourth and last edition was held. In 1987, the fifth edition was scheduled to be held with a new “final three” format (which would have replaced the Supercopa de España, which for this reason was not held in the 1987 or 1988 seasons), for which they were already classified. Real Madrid (League champion), Real Sociedad (Cup champion) and Atlético Madrid (champion of the “intermediate league” of the “Playoff League”). The clubs finally agreed to cancel the competition due to the saturation of the match schedule, especially due to the strange League format of that 1986–87 season.

== Format ==
The League Cup was a straight knock-out competition. All ties were played over two legs, home and away, with the team with the largest aggregate score progressing. The final also consisted of two games.

If the aggregate score was tied after two legs of ninety minutes each, extra-time would be played. If that failed to separate the teams, a penalty shootout would determine the winner. Unlike the Copa del Rey, the away goals rule was not applied.

== Champions ==
Season	Winners	Runners-up	First leg score	Second leg score	Result (agg.)
1983	Barcelona	Real Madrid	2–2	2–1	4–3
1984	Real Valladolid	Atlético Madrid	0–0	3–0 (a.e.t.)	3–0
1985	Real Madrid	Atlético Madrid	2–3	2–0	4–3
1986	Barcelona	Real Betis	0–1	2–0	2–1

== Top goalscorers ==
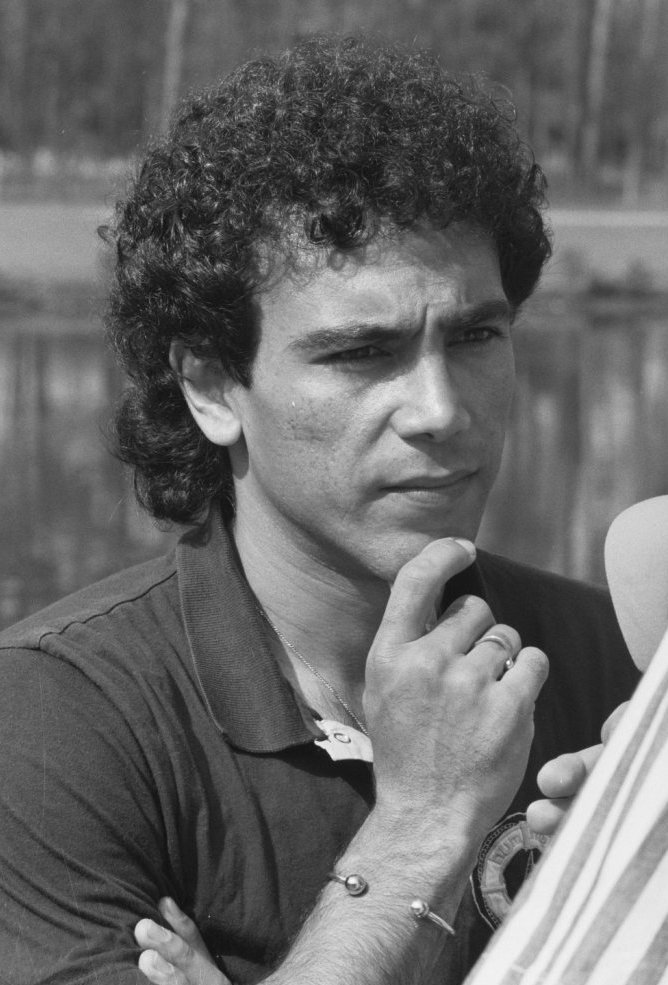
Hugo Sánchez is the all-time top goalscorer in the competition.

No.	Nat.	Player	Pos.	Club(s) (goals)	Total
1	(Mexico)	Hugo Sánchez	FW	Atlético Madrid (14)	14
2	(Paraguay)	Raúl Amarilla	FW	Real Zaragoza (9); Barcelona (4)	13
3	(Spain)	Pedro Uralde	FW	Real Sociedad (9)	9
3	(Spain)	Roberto Marina	FW	Atlético Madrid (9)	9
5	(Spain)	Santillana	FW	Real Madrid (8)	8 (Note: Includes the first goal against Real Zaragoza on 22 June 1983; some sites such as Be Soccer attribute it to Santillana, while others such as BDFutbol attribute it as an own goal by Eugenio Vitaller.)
6	(Spain)	Michel Pineda	FW	Espanyol (7)	7
6	(Spain)	Paco Machín	FW	Real Betis (5); Racing de Santander (2)	7
6	(Denmark)	John Lauridsen	MF	Espanyol (7)	7
6	(Spain)	Juan Arteche	DF	Atlético Madrid (7)	7
