= Julio Prieto =

Spanish footballer

Personal information
- Full name: Julio Prieto Martín
- Date of birth: 21 November 1960 (age 65)
- Place of birth: Madrid, Spain
- Height: 1.73 m (5 ft 8 in)
- Position: Midfielder

Youth career
- 1973–1979: Atlético Madrid

Senior career*
Years	Team	Apps	(Gls)
1979–1981	Atlético Madrileño	66	(19)
1981–1987	Atlético Madrid	166	(12)
1981–1982	→ Castellón (loan)	20	(2)
1987–1990	Celta	107	(19)
1990–1991	Atlético Madrid	12	(0)
1991–1993	Mérida	51	(4)
1993–1995	Talavera	63	(9)
Total		485	(65)

International career
1980	Spain U20	1	(0)
1980–1982	Spain U21	12	(4)
- * Club domestic league appearances and goals

Julio Prieto Martín (born 21 November 1960) is a Spanish former professional footballer who played as a midfielder.

In a 16-year career, he appeared in 305 La Liga matches over 11 seasons (33 goals), mainly in representation of Atlético Madrid.

== Club career ==
Born in Madrid, Prieto played mainly for hometown club Atlético Madrid during his professional career. After spending one season with the reserves in the Segunda División and another on loan to CD Castellón in La Liga (with relegation), he returned to the Colchoneros, being a starter for much of his five-year spell.

In the 1982–83 campaign, Prieto had his best year at Atlético with seven goals in 32 games in a third-place finish. He helped the club to two major titles, then was part of the squad that reached the 1986 European Cup Winners' Cup final, appearing in the decisive match that was lost 3–0 against FC Dynamo Kyiv.

Prieto signed for RC Celta de Vigo in summer 1987, totalling 126 appearances and scoring 21 times for the Galicians but suffering top-flight relegation in his final year. He returned to Atlético Madrid for 1990–91, but was only a fringe player in his third stint.

After two seasons in the second tier with CP Mérida, Prieto retired from football aged 34 with Talavera CF, in the Segunda División B. Subsequently, he worked as a players' agent.

== Honours ==
Atlético Madrid

- Copa del Rey: 1984–85, 1990–91
- Supercopa de España: 1985
- UEFA Cup Winners' Cup runner-up: 1985–86
