= Clemente Villaverde =

Spanish footballer (born 1959)

Clemente
Personal information
- Full name: Clemente Villaverde Huelva
- Date of birth: 8 February 1959 (age 67)
- Place of birth: Cangas de Onís, Spain
- Height: 1.77 m (5 ft 9 1/2 in)
- Position: Left-back

Youth career
- Atlético Madrid

Senior career*
Years	Team	Apps	(Gls)
1977–1981	Atlético Madrileño	98	(1)
1981–1987	Atlético Madrid	102	(0)
1987–1990	Málaga	89	(1)
Total		289	(2)
- * Club domestic league appearances and goals

Clemente Villaverde Huelva (born 8 February 1959), known simply as Clemente, is a Spanish former professional footballer who played as a left-back.

== Playing career ==
Clemente was born in Cangas de Onís, Asturias. He joined Atlético Madrid in 1977, going on to spend the vast majority of his first five years at the club with the reserves, playing two seasons in the Segunda División and three in the Segunda División B.

Definitely promoted to the main squad for the 1982–83 campaign, Clemente proceeded to be regularly used, helping them to win two major titles while totalling 151 official games. He was part of the team that reached the final of the 1985–86 European Cup Winners' Cup, appearing in the decisive match against FC Dynamo Kyiv (3–0 loss).

In summer 1987, Clemente joined second-tier side CD Málaga alongside his Atlético teammate Miguel Ángel Ruiz. He experienced both one La Liga promotion and relegation with the Andalusians, and retired at the age of 31.

== Post-retirement ==
Clemente returned to Atlético subsequently, being CEO Miguel Ángel Gil Marín's right-hand man. In January 2020, after over 25 years in this position, he joined Getafe CF as new general manager; he left the latter club one year later.

== Honours ==
Atlético Madrid

- Copa del Rey: 1984–85
- Supercopa de España: 1985
- UEFA Cup Winners' Cup runner-up: 1985–86

Málaga

- Segunda División: 1987–88
