= Juanjo Enríquez =

Spanish footballer and manager

Personal information
- Full name: Juan José Enríquez Gómez
- Date of birth: 4 November 1950
- Place of birth: Madrid, Spain
- Date of death: 10 August 2015 (aged 64)
- Place of death: Murcia, Spain
- Height: 1.84 m (6 ft 1/2 in)
- Position: Centre back

Youth career
- Atlético Madrid

Senior career*
Years	Team	Apps	(Gls)
1972–1974	Atlético Madrid B		
1974–1977	Salamanca	71	(4)
1977–1979	Barcelona	13	(0)
1979–1981	Recreativo	35	(3)
1981–1985	Atlético Madrid	46	(0)
1985–1986	Lorca Deportiva		
1986–1987	Cieza		
Total		165	(7)

Managerial career
- Cieza
- 1998: Granada
- 2000: Conquense
- 2000: Getafe
- 2004: Ciudad de Murcia
- 2009: Águilas
- * Club domestic league appearances and goals

Juan José Enríquez Gómez (born 4 November 1950), commonly known as Juanjo, was a Spanish retired footballer who played as a central defender, and a former manager.

Notable for his strength and tight marking, he amassed 130 matches and four goals in La Liga, mainly while representing Salamanca. As a manager, he rarely settled with a club.

== Playing career ==
Born in Madrid, Juanjo was an Atlético Madrid youth graduate, but only appeared with the reserves. In 1974, he joined La Liga side UD Salamanca, being a key defensive unit for the club during his three-year spell; he was also called up for the national team in 1978 for a match against Romania, but watched the 0–1 as an unused substitute.

Juanjo moved to FC Barcelona in 1977, after impressing in a match against the Catalans where he was incumbed to man-mark Johan Cruyff. However, he was rarely used during his first campaign, and received no playing time in his second.

Released by Barça in 1979, Juanjo signed for Recreativo de Huelva in Segunda División. In 1981, despite appearing in only four matches in the previous season, he returned to Atlético Madrid.

Juanjo was sparingly used during his time at Atleti, and subsequently represented Lorca Deportiva CF and CD Cieza before retiring.

== Managerial career ==
In 1998 Juanjo was appointed manager of Segunda División B's Granada CF, managing to finish 4th. In 2000, after a short spell at UB Conquense in the third tier, he was named Getafe CF manager.

Juanjo was sacked in December 2000, as his reign only lasted 16 matches. On 26 January 2004 he was appointed at the helm of Ciudad de Murcia, but was relieved from his duties on 27 April.

On 25 July 2009 Juanjo was appointed Águilas CF manager. He was sacked in November, with the side being relegated nonetheless.

== Death ==
On 10 August 2015, Juanjo was found dead at his house in El Esparragal, Murcia. His death was considered by "natural causes".

== Honours ==
Barcelona

- Copa del Rey: 1977–78
- UEFA Cup Winners' Cup: 1978–79

Atlético Madrid

- Copa del Rey: 1984–85
