= Miguel Ángel Ruiz (Spanish footballer) =

Spanish football player/director (born 1955)

Personal information
- Full name: Miguel Ángel Ruiz García
- Date of birth: 5 January 1955 (age 71)
- Place of birth: Toledo, Spain
- Height: 1.85 m (6 ft 1 in)
- Position: Centre-back

Senior career*
Years	Team	Apps	(Gls)
1975–1977	Atlético Madrileño		
1977–1987	Atlético Madrid	262	(17)
1987–1990	Málaga	93	(6)
1990–1991	Albacete	1	(0)
Total		356	(23)
- * Club domestic league appearances and goals

Miguel Ángel Ruiz García (born 5 January 1955) is a Spanish former professional footballer who played as a central defender.

== Club career ==
Ruiz was born in Toledo, Castilla–La Mancha. He made his professional debut with Atlético Madrid in 1977. From the 1979–80 season onwards he was an undisputed starter for the Spanish capital club, rarely missing a La Liga fixture when healthy and helping the side to two major titles; he was part of the team that reached the final of the 1985–86 European Cup Winners' Cup, appearing in the decisive match against FC Dynamo Kyiv (3–0 loss).

In the summer of 1987, following 356 competitive games at the Vicente Calderón Stadium, Ruiz joined CD Málaga of the second tier along with his Atlético teammate Clemente, going on to experience both one promotion and relegation with the Andalusians. He retired in 1991 at the age of 36, after contributing only one minute to Albacete Balompié's first-ever promotion to the top flight.

Subsequently, Ruiz worked as general manager for Atlético Madrid, CD Tenerife, Valencia CF and Albacete. In late November 2009 he left his post at the latter club, who was facing severe economic difficulties.

== Honours ==
Atlético Madrid

- Copa del Rey: 1984–85
- Supercopa de España: 1985
- UEFA Cup Winners' Cup runner-up: 1985–86

Málaga

- Segunda División: 1987–88

Albacete

- Segunda División: 1990–91
