= 1984 Copa de la Liga =

Copa de la Liga
Tournament details
- Country: Spain
- Teams: 21

Final positions
- Champions: Real Valladolid
- Runners-up: Atlético Madrid

Tournament statistics
- Matches played: 44
- Goals scored: 118 (2.68 per match)
- Top goal scorer: (Mexico) Hugo Sánchez (6 goals)

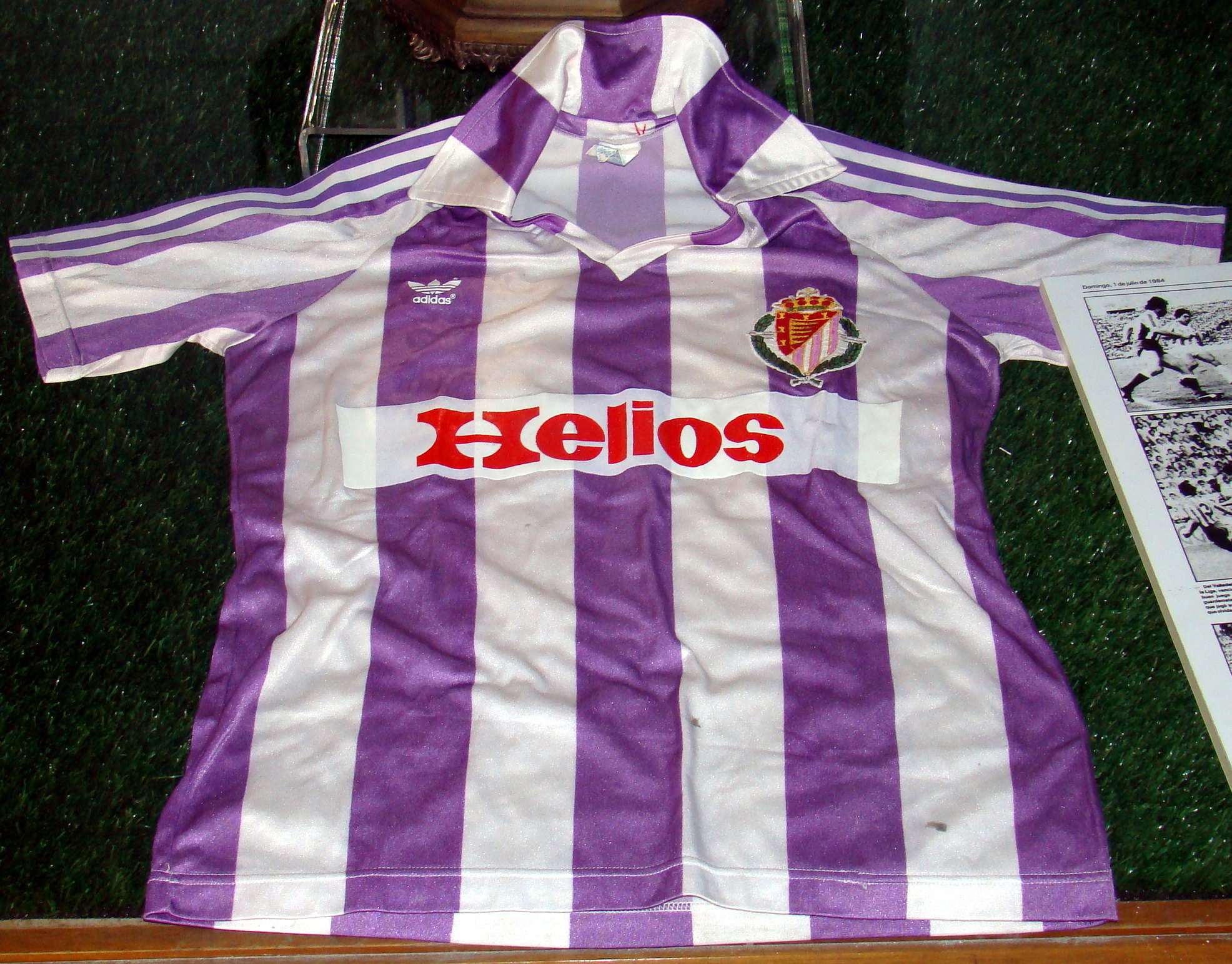
Real Valladolid shirt in the 1983/84 season, when they won their only official trophy: the 1984 Copa de la Liga.

The 1984 Copa de la Liga was the second edition of Copa de la Liga. The competition started on May 4, 1984, and concluded on June 30, 1984. Due to time constraints, saturation and club pressure, the Copa de la Liga only lasted four years since 1982, being cancelled in 1986.

== Format ==
The Copa de la Liga was played by the 18 teams of the 1983-84 La Liga and 3 winners of the 1983 Copa de la Liga of Segunda División, Segunda División B and Tercera División. All rounds were played over two legs. The team that had the higher aggregate score over the two legs progressed to the next round. The 1983-84 Copa del Rey final teams were exempt until the second round.

=== La Liga ===
- Athletic Bilbao
- Atlético Madrid
- FC Barcelona
- Real Betis
- Cádiz CF
- RCD Español
- Málaga CF
- RCD Mallorca
- CA Osasuna
- Real Madrid
- Real Murcia
- Real Zaragoza
- Real Sociedad
- Real Valladolid
- UD Salamanca
- Sevilla CF
- Sporting Gijón
- Valencia CF

=== Other teams ===
- Atlético Madrileño, winner of 1983 Copa de la Liga of Segunda División.
- Sporting Gijón Atlético, winner of 1983 Copa de la Liga of Segunda División B group I.
- Albacete Balompié, winner of 1983 Copa de la Liga of Segunda División B group II.
- Real Madrid Aficionados, winner of 1983 Copa de la Liga of Tercera División

== First round ==
First leg: 4, 6 and 9 May 1984. Second leg: 13, 15 and 23 May 1984.

Team 1	Agg.	Team 2	1st leg	2nd leg
Sevilla CF	(p) 1–1	Valencia CF	1–0	0–1
Real Madrid	3–4	Atlético Madrid	1–1	2–3
RCD Español	6–2	Real Murcia	2–1	4–1
Real Valladolid	5–2	Real Zaragoza	1–0	4–2
Real Sociedad	2–0	Cádiz CF	2–0	0–0
RCD Mallorca	4–2	UD Salamanca	3–1	1–1
CA Osasuna	6–2	Albacete Balompié	1–1	5–1
Málaga CF	3–0	Atlético Madrileño	1–0	2–0
Real Madrid Aficionados	0–3	Sporting Gijón	0–0	0–3
Real Betis	(p) 4–4	Sporting Gijón Atlético	0–0	4–4

== Second round ==
First leg: 19 and 20 May 1984. Second leg: 27 and 28 May 1984.

Team 1	Agg.	Team 2	1st leg	2nd leg
FC Barcelona	3–2	Real Sociedad	3–0	0–2
Athletic Bilbao	3–6	Atlético Madrid	1–3	2–3
Sporting Gijón	4–2	CA Osasuna	3–0	1–2
RCD Mallorca	4–1	Málaga CF	2–1	2–0

- Bye: Real Betis, RCD Español, Sevilla FC, Real Valladolid.

== Quarter-finals ==
First leg: 2 and 3 June 1984. Second leg: 9 and 10 June 1984.

Team 1	Agg.	Team 2	1st leg	2nd leg
Sporting Gijón	1–2	Real Betis	0–1	1–1
RCD Español	2–6	Atlético Madrid	0–2	2–4
RCD Mallorca	4–4 (p)	FC Barcelona	2–1	2–3
Sevilla FC	3–3 (p)	Real Valladolid	2–0	1–3

== Semi-finals ==
First leg: 16 June 1984. Second leg: 21 June 1984.

Team 1	Agg.	Team 2	1st leg	2nd leg
FC Barcelona	2–4	Atlético Madrid	1–2	1–2
Real Betis	2–3	Real Valladolid	2–0	0–3

== Final ==
=== First leg ===
24 June 1984

Atlético Madrid	0–0	Real Valladolid

Vicente Calderón, Madrid

=== Second leg ===
30 June 1984

Real Valladolid	3–0	Atlético Madrid
Votava 98' (o.g.); Fortes 106'; Minguela 113'

Nuevo José Zorrilla, Valladolid

Copa de la Liga
1984 Winners
Real Valladolid
1st title
