= Juan José Rubio =

Spanish footballer (born 1956)

Personal information
- Full name: Juan José Rubio Jiménez
- Date of birth: 28 August 1956 (age 70)
- Place of birth: Madrid, Spain
- Height: 1.73 m (5 ft 8 in)
- Position: Forward

Senior career*
Years	Team	Apps	(Gls)
- Atlético Madrid B
1977–1987	Atlético Madrid	249	(30)
1987–1989	Sabadell	60	(10)
Total		309+	(40+)

International career
1979–1980	Spain U23	10	(5)
1980–1981	Spain B	5	(3)
1981	Spain	1	(0)

Managerial career
- 1997: Atlético Marbella
- * Club domestic league appearances and goals

Juan José Rubio Jiménez (born 28 August 1956) is a Spanish former professional footballer who played as a forward.

He spent most of his career with Atlético Madrid, achieving figures of 334 games and 49 goals across all competitions, and winning the Copa del Rey and Supercopa de España in 1985. He recorded 283 games and 49 goals in La Liga, in which he also had one season at Sabadell. He played one game for Spain in 1981.

== Club career ==
Born in Madrid, Rubio came through the youth ranks of Atlético Madrid and was playing in the reserve team when he was called up to the first team by manager Luis Aragonés. He made his debut on 27 April 1977 in a Copa del Rey last 16 first leg match away to Sevilla, playing the final 20 minutes as a substitute for Eugenio Leal in a 2–0 loss.

In 1977–78, Rubio was used frequently in La Liga, and scored his first goal on 13 November in a 4–2 home win over Salamanca. He played the 1985 Copa del Rey final, which his team won 2–1 over Athletic Bilbao, adding in October the Supercopa de España against Barcelona. In the UEFA Cup Winners' Cup, he scored a penalty away to West Germany's Bayer Uerdingen in a 3–2 win in the semi-final second leg, but was unused for the final, lost 3–0 to Dynamo Kyiv in Lyon.

In July 1987, Rubio's 17-year spell at the Vicente Calderón Stadium ended as he transferred to Sabadell on a two-year deal. He chose the Catalan club over offers from Logroñés, Mallorca and Celta Vigo. He scored seven goals as they were relegated to the Segunda División in his first season, and was released a year later.

Rubio had a brief spell as a manager for Atlético Marbella in Segunda División B in 1996–97. He was one of four managers as the club from the Costa del Sol were immediately relegated.

== International career ==
Rubio represented the Spain under-23 team in qualification for the 1980 Olympic event in the Soviet Union. He scored in home wins in the last two qualifiers: a 2–0 victory against Belgium and two in a 3–1 win over France to ensure passage.

On 24 September 1980, in his first game for the B-team, Rubio scored two penalties in a 2–2 draw with Hungary in Valencia. The following 18 February, he won his only cap for the senior team in a 1–0 win over France at his club ground of the Calderón. He was criticised by Mundo Deportivo as "too fragile and limited" for international football.
