= Quique Ramos =

Spanish footballer

Personal information
- Full name: Enrique Ramos González
- Date of birth: 7 March 1956 (age 70)
- Place of birth: Madrid, Spain
- Height: 1.70 m (5 ft 7 in)
- Position: Defensive midfielder

Youth career
- Pinto
- Parla
- Pons
- Atlético Madrid

Senior career*
Years	Team	Apps	(Gls)
1977–1979	Atlético Madrileño	35	(4)
1979–1988	Atlético Madrid	270	(19)
1989–1990	Rayo Vallecano	3	(0)
Total		308	(23)

International career
1984	Spain U21	4	(0)
1980	Spain U23	2	(0)
1979–1983	Spain amateur	9	(1)
1980–1981	Spain B	4	(0)
1981–1985	Spain	4	(0)
- * Club domestic league appearances and goals

Enrique 'Quique' Ramos González (born 7 March 1956) is a Spanish former professional footballer who played as a defensive midfielder.

== Club career ==
Born in Madrid, Ramos finished his youth career at Atlético Madrid, making his La Liga debut on 9 September 1979 and scoring in the 3–2 away win over Hércules CF. He remained a first-team regular until the end of his tenure, helping the capital side to win the 1985 Copa del Rey and Supercopa de España.

However, after the 1987–88 season, mainly due to serious personal problems with elusive club chairman Jesús Gil, he left the Colchoneros and retired altogether – after one year of inactivity – in June 1990, with lowly Rayo Vallecano, being relegated from La Liga.

== International career ==
Ramos represented Spain on four occasions. His debut came on 18 February 1981, in a friendly against France (1–0 victory).

== Honours ==
Atlético Madrid

- Copa del Rey: 1984–85
- Supercopa de España: 1985
- UEFA Cup Winners' Cup: runner-up 1985–86

Spain Under-21

- UEFA Under-21 European Championship runner-up: 1984
