= Ángel Mejías =

Spanish footballer & coach (born 1959)

Personal information
- Full name: Ángel Jesús Mejías Rodríguez
- Date of birth: 1 March 1959 (age 67)
- Place of birth: Tembleque, Spain
- Height: 1.83 m (6 ft 0 in)
- Position: Goalkeeper

Youth career
- Díter Zafra

Senior career*
Years	Team	Apps	(Gls)
1977–1979	Toledo		
1979–1981	Atlético Madrid B	57	(0)
1981–1993	Atlético Madrid	109	(0)
1993–1994	Talavera	16	(0)
1994–1998	Rayo Majadahonda		
- * Club domestic league appearances and goals

Ángel Jesús Mejías Rodríguez (born 1 March 1959) is a Spanish former professional footballer who played as a goalkeeper.

== Playing career ==
Born in Tembleque, Province of Toledo, Mejías joined Atlético Madrid from his hometown club CD Toledo, spending his first two seasons as a senior with the reserves, the second in the Segunda División. He made his official debut for the first team on 21 February 1982 in a 0–1 home loss to FC Barcelona, and began being regularly played from his second season in La Liga onwards.

After the emergence of Abel Resino at the Colchoneros, Mejías became the backup, appearing in only 15 league matches over seven seasons. Due to injury to his teammate, he was in goal for the 1991 final of the Copa del Rey, won 1–0 against RCD Mallorca in extra time, claiming his second winner's medal in the competition. He left the club in June 1993 at the age of 34, still playing five more years (including four with CF Rayo Majadahonda) in the lower leagues until his retirement.

== Coaching career ==
Subsequently, Mejías returned to Atlético, working as goalkeeper coach. After leaving, he worked in the same capacity with Beşiktaş JK, Rayo Vallecano and Málaga CF.

== Honours ==
Atlético Madrid

- Copa del Rey: 1984–85, 1990–91; runner-up: 1986–87
- Supercopa de España: 1985; runner-up: 1991, 1992
- UEFA Cup Winners' Cup runner-up: 1985–86

Rayo Majadahonda

- Tercera División: 1995–96, 1996–97
