= Mario Cabrera =

Argentine retired footballer (born 1956)

Personal information
- Full name: Luis Mario Cabrera Molina
- Date of birth: 9 July 1956 (age 70)
- Place of birth: La Rioja, Argentina
- Height: 1.76 m (5 ft 9 in)
- Position: Striker

Youth career
- Huracán

Senior career*
Years	Team	Apps	(Gls)
1975–1978	Huracán	61	(19)
1978–1980	Castellón	73	(27)
1980–1986	Atlético Madrid	111	(41)
1986–1988	Cádiz	73	(17)
1988–1990	Castellón	55	(7)
Total		373	(111)
- * Club domestic league appearances and goals

Luis Mario Cabrera Molina (born 9 July 1956) is an Argentine retired footballer who played as a striker.

He spent almost his entire career in Spain – 12 seasons in representation of three teams, mainly Atlético Madrid.

== Club career ==
Cabrera was born in La Rioja. He started his career in his country with Club Atlético Huracán in 1975, scoring 19 goals in two years. In 1978, he moved to Spain, starting out at CD Castellón in its second division.

For the 1980–81 season, Cabrera joined Atlético Madrid, but struggled for most of his stay there, overshadowed by Mexican Hugo Sánchez. Eventually the pair complemented itself, combining for 33 La Liga goals in 1984–85 as the capital side finished second and won the Copa del Rey; after the latter's departure to Real Madrid he played even more, and started in the following year's UEFA Cup Winners' Cup final, lost to FC Dynamo Kyiv.

Towards the end of his career, Cabrera played for Cádiz CF and had a second spell with Castellón (helping them promote to the top flight in his debut campaign), retiring at 34 with 209 matches and 63 goals in Spain's main tier.

== Honours ==
Season	Team	Title
1984–85	Atlético Madrid	Copa del Rey
1985	Atlético Madrid	Supercopa de España
1985–86	Atlético Madrid	Runner-up UEFA Cup Winners' Cup
1988–89	Castellón	Segunda División
