= Jesús Landáburu =

Spanish footballer

Personal information
- Full name: Jesús Landáburu Sagüillo
- Date of birth: 24 January 1955 (age 71)
- Place of birth: Guardo, Spain
- Height: 1.75 m (5 ft 9 in)
- Position: Midfielder

Youth career
- Guardo
- Colegio San José
- Valladolid

Senior career*
Years	Team	Apps	(Gls)
1972–1977	Valladolid	146	(35)
1977–1979	Rayo Vallecano	66	(13)
1979–1982	Barcelona	61	(13)
1982–1988	Atlético Madrid	205	(28)
Total		478	(89)

International career
1979	Spain amateur	3	(1)
1980	Spain	1	(0)
- * Club domestic league appearances and goals

Jesús 'Chus' Landáburu Sagüillo (born 24 January 1955) is a Spanish former professional footballer who played as a central midfielder.

== Club career ==
Born in Guardo, Province of Palencia, Landáburu made his professional debut at only 17 with Real Valladolid. He quickly made an impression with the Segunda División club, his skills, field vision and set piece ability standing out alike.

Landáburu first appeared in La Liga with Madrid-based Rayo Vallecano, in the 1977–78 campaign. He contributed heavily as the modest team consecutively retained their top-flight status, following which he signed for league powerhouse FC Barcelona.

Landáburu won his first piece of silverware with the Catalans in 1981, the Copa del Rey. After two good seasons, he struggled immensely in his last as Barça hired a new manager, German Udo Lattek.

In summer 1982, Landáburu joined Atlético Madrid, being first-choice throughout his tenure (288 competitive appearances). At the end of 1987–88, however, mainly due to serious personal problems with elusive club chairman Jesús Gil, he chose to retire at the age of 33; still an active player, he majored in physics.

== International career ==
On 23 January 1980, Landáburu won his only cap for Spain, featuring the second half of a 1–0 friendly win over the Netherlands in Vigo.

== Honours ==
Barcelona

- Copa del Rey: 1980–81

Atlético Madrid

- Copa del Rey: 1984–85
- Supercopa de España: 1985
- UEFA Cup Winners' Cup runner-up: 1985–86
