= Roberto Marina =

Spanish retired footballer (born 1961)

Personal information
- Full name: Roberto Simón Marina
- Date of birth: 28 August 1961 (age 65)
- Place of birth: Villanueva de la Serena, Spain
- Height: 1.66 m (5 ft 5 1/2 in)
- Position: Midfielder

Youth career
- CD Las Islas
- 1976–1980: Atlético Madrid

Senior career*
| Years | Team | Apps | (Gls) |
| 1980–1982 | Atlético Madrileño | 55 | (19) |
| 1980–1990 | Atlético Madrid | 235 | (43) |
| 1990–1992 | Mallorca | 30 | (2) |
| 1992–1995 | Toledo | 66 | (9) |
| Total | | 386 | (73) |

International career
| 1981 | Spain U19 | 5 | (1) |
| 1981 | Spain U20 | 2 | (0) |
| 1982–1986 | Spain U21 | 12 | (1) |
| 1986–1987 | Spain U23 | 5 | (0) |
| 1984 | Spain amateur | 1 | (0) |
| 1985 | Spain | 1 | (0) |

Managerial career
- 1996–1997: Toledo (assistant)
- 1998: Ourense (assistant)
- ?–?: Atlético Madrid C
- 2001–2003: Atlético Madrid (assistant)
- 2003–2006: Atlético Madrid B (assistant)
- 2006: Atlético Madrid (assistant)
- 2006–2007: Xerez (assistant)
- 2007–2008: Castellón (assistant)
- 2008–2009: Celta (assistant)
- 2009: Albacete (assistant)
- 2011: Salamanca (assistant)
- 2011: Braşov (assistant)
- 2014: Levski Sofia (assistant)
- 2014: Atlético Madrid B
- 2016–2017: Legirus Inter (assistant)
- 2017–2020: Al Shahaniya (assistant)
- * Club domestic league appearances and goals

Roberto Simón Marina (born 28 August 1961) is a Spanish former professional footballer who played as a midfielder.

Over 11 seasons, he amassed La Liga totals of 265 games and 45 goals, with Atlético Madrid and Mallorca.

== Club career ==
Born in Villanueva de la Serena, Province of Badajoz, Marina started his professional career with Atlético Madrid, being definitely promoted to the first team for the 1982–83 season and scoring five goals in 25 games as they finished in third position in La Liga. With the Colchoneros, he won the Copa del Rey in 1985 and was a starter in the 1986 European Cup Winners' Cup final, lost 3–0 to FC Dynamo Kyiv.

Having made 315 competitive appearances for the Madrid side, with the honour of scoring their 3,000th league goal on 14 January 1990, Marina finished his 15-year career following spells with RCD Mallorca and CD Toledo (the latter in the Segunda División), retiring at the age of 33. He began a manager career shortly after, starting with his last team then moving to CD Ourense, always as an assistant; he subsequently returned to Atlético, being charged with the youth sides and the C team in the Tercera División.

Marina returned to assistant manager duties under his mentor as a player at Atlético Luis Aragonés, who brought him to the staff in 2001. Two seasons later, he aided José Murcia at Atlético B, continuing to work with the latter in the following years.

== International career ==
After regular performances for Atlético, Marina earned his only cap for Spain: on 26 May 1985, he played six minutes in a friendly against the Republic of Ireland, in Cork.

== Honours ==
Atlético Madrid

- Copa del Rey: 1984–85; runner-up: 1986–87
- Supercopa de España: 1985
- UEFA Cup Winners' Cup runner-up: 1985–86

Mallorca

- Copa del Rey runner-up: 1990–91

Spain Under-21

- UEFA Under-21 European Championship runner-up: 1984
