= Juan Carlos Arteche =

Spanish footballer (1957–2010)

Personal information
- Full name: Juan Carlos Arteche Gómez
- Date of birth: 11 April 1957
- Place of birth: Maliaño, Spain
- Date of death: 13 October 2010 (aged 53)
- Place of death: Madrid, Spain
- Height: 1.88 m (6 ft 2 in)
- Position: Centre-back

Youth career
- 1974–1975: Racing Santander

Senior career*
| Years | Team | Apps | (Gls) |
| 1975–1978 | Racing Santander | 48 | (2) |
| 1975–1976 | → Gimnástica (loan) | 25 | (0) |
| 1978–1989 | Atlético Madrid | 308 | (18) |
| Total | | 381 | (20) |

International career
| 1986 | Spain U23 | 1 | (0) |
| 1986–1987 | Spain | 4 | (1) |
- * Club domestic league appearances and goals

Juan Carlos Arteche Gómez (11 April 1957 – 13 October 2010) was a Spanish footballer who played as a central defender.

A player of imposing physical presence with great aerial ability, he spent 11 years of his professional career with Atlético Madrid, appearing in 421 competitive games for the club.

== Club career ==
Born in Maliaño, Cantabria, Arteche began playing professionally with local Racing de Santander after starting in basketball and tennis. He made his debut in the 1976–77 season and appeared in 16 La Liga games as the club finished 15th, barely avoiding relegation.

After one more year with Racing, Arteche signed for Atlético Madrid, being an undisputed starter early on as well as captain. In 1984–85, he helped the Colchoneros to the second position in the league only behind champions FC Barcelona and that campaign's Copa del Rey; subsequently, they reached the final of the UEFA Cup Winners' Cup, a 3–0 loss against FC Dynamo Kyiv.

After only two matches in 1988–89, mainly due to serious personal problems with elusive Atlético chairman Jesús Gil, Arteche chose to retire at 32.

== International career ==
Arteche won four caps for Spain in three months, his debut coming against Romania on 12 November 1986 for the UEFA Euro 1988 qualifiers. In his last appearance, he could not stop England's Gary Lineker from scoring all of the opposition's goals in the 4–2 friendly loss in Madrid.

== Death ==
After a long battle with blood cancer, Arteche died in Madrid on 13 October 2010. He was 53.

== Honours ==
Atlético Madrid

- Copa del Rey: 1984–85; runner-up: 1986–87
- Supercopa de España: 1985
- UEFA Cup Winners' Cup runner-up: 1985–86
