= 1984–85 Copa del Rey =

83rd Copa del Rey

Tournament details
- Country: Spain
- Dates: 12 September 1984 – 30 June 1985
- Teams: 142

Final positions
- Champions: Atlético Madrid
- Runners-up: Athletic Bilbao

Tournament statistics
- Matches played: 281
- Goals scored: 790 (2.81 per match)

The 1984–85 Copa del Rey was the 83rd staging of the Spanish Cup, the annual domestic football cup competition in Spain. The tournament was attended by 142 teams from the higher echelons of Spanish football.

The tournament began on 12 September 1984 and ended on 30 June 1985 with the final, held at the Santiago Bernabéu Stadium in Madrid.

The final was played between Athletic Bilbao (the defending champions of the tournament), and Atlético Madrid. The match ended with a 2–1 victory for the team from the capital, with Hugo Sánchez as the star, scoring two goals.

With this victory Atlético secured their sixth cup, making them the team with the fourth-most titles in the competition.

== Format ==
Schedule
Round	Fixture	Clubs	Gain entry
First round	65	142 → 77	All Clubs participating gain entry
Second round	36	77 → 41	(*)
Third round	20	41 → 21	
Fourth round	5	21 → 16	
Round of 16	8	16 → 8	Real Madrid CF (*)
Quarter-finals	4	8 → 4	
Semi-finals	2	4 → 2	
Final	1	2 → 1	

Teams
Division	No. clubs
1ª División	18
2ª División	20
2ª División B	26
3ª División	78
Total teams	142

- All rounds are played over two legs except the final which is played a single match in a neutral venue. The team that has the higher aggregate score over the two legs progresses to the next round.
- In case of a tie on aggregate, will play an extra time of 30 minutes, and if still tied, will be decided with a penalty shoot-outs.
- The teams that play European competitions are exempt until the round of 16 or when they are removed from the tournament.
- The winners of the competition will earn a place in the group stage of next season's UEFA Cup Winners' Cup, if they have not already qualified for European competition, if so then the runners-up will instead take this berth.

(*) Teams playing European competition / Athletic Bilbao, Atlético de Madrid, FC Barcelona, Real Betis, Real Valladolid Deportivo started the tournament in the second round.

== First round ==
First round
Home 1st leg	Agg.	Home 2nd leg	1st leg			2nd leg			Notes
Arenas de Getxo	1–6	SD Eibar	12 Sep 1984	1–3		19 Sep 1984	3–0		
Real Valladolid Promesas	3–1	SD Ponferradina	12 Sep 1984	3–0		3 Oct 1984	1–0		
Atlético Astorga CF	1–7	Real Burgos CF	19 Sep 1984	1–2		3 Oct 1984	5–0		
CD Getxo	0–2	CD Santurtzi	19 Sep 1984	0–1		11 Oct 1984	1–0		
Atlético Baleares	3–4	CD Murense	19 Sep 1984	3–1		3 Oct 1984	3–0		
CD Tudelano	3–5	Endesa Andorra	19 Sep 1984	3–3		3 Oct 1984	2–0		
AD Sabiñánigo	3–8	CD Arnedo	19 Sep 1984	2–3		26 Sep 1984	5–1		
UD Güímar	2–2 (p)	CD Mensajero	19 Sep 1984	2–1		3 Oct 1984	1–0		Penalties: 4–5 for UD Güímar.
CD Lalín	2–3	CD Ourense	19 Sep 1984	1–1		3 Oct 1984	2–1		
CD Díter Zafra	0–5	Mérida Industrial CF	19 Sep 1984	0–1		3 Oct 1984	4–0		
CD Ilicitano	2–2 (p)	Torrevieja CF	19 Sep 1984	2–1		3 Oct 1984	1–0		Penalties: x–x for CD Ilicitano.
Sevilla Atlético	2–4	Atlético Sanluqueño CF	19 Sep 1984	2–1	Rep.	3 Oct 1984	3–0	Rep.	
CD Estepona	4–1	UD San Pedro	19 Sep 1984	2–0		4 Oct 1984	1–2		
CP Cacereño	1–2	CD Don Benito	19 Sep 1984	1–1		3 Oct 1984	1–0		
Villanueva del Arzobispo CF	1–1 (p)	CD Iliturgi	19 Sep 1984	1–0		3 Oct 1984	1–0		Penalties: x–x for CD Iliturgi - played on 4 Oct due to lack of visibility.
Levante UD	2–0	UD Aspense	19 Sep 1984	2–0		3 Oct 1984	0–0		
CD Ciempozuelos	3–7	AD Parla	19 Sep 1984	2–3		3 Oct 1984	4–1		
Real Madrid Aficionados	1–2	CD Pegaso	19 Sep 1984	1–1		3 Oct 1984	1–0		
CF Badalona	1–2	EC Granollers	20 Sep 1984	1–0	Rep.	4 Oct 1984	2–0	Rep.	
UD Icodense	3–2	UD Las Palmas Atlético	20 Sep 1984	2–1		3 Oct 1984	1–1		
UB Conquense	1–4	Calvo Sotelo CF	26 Sep 1984	1–1		3 Oct 1984	3–0		
Yeclano CF	1–8	Real Murcia CF	26 Sep 1984	1–0	Rep.	3 Oct 1984	8–0	Rep.	
Caudal Deportivo	6–1	UP Langreo	26 Sep 1984	3–1		10 Oct 1984	0–3		
Betis Deportivo	4–3	Algeciras CF	26 Sep 1984	3–1	Rep.	10 Oct 1984	2–1	Rep.	
CD Mestalla	4–6	CD Castellón	26 Sep 1984	2–1		9 Oct 1984	5–2	Rep.	
Coria CF	1–4	Cádiz CF	26 Sep 1984	0–2	Rep.	3 Oct 1984	2–1	Rep.	
CD Maspalomas	2–6	UD Las Palmas	26 Sep 1984	2–4		24 Oct 1984	2–0		
CD Turón	1–2	Real Oviedo CF	27 Sep 1984	0–1		3 Oct 1984	1–1		
Cultural Durango	1–5	Real Sociedad	2 Oct 1984	1–3	Rep.	24 Oct 1984	2–0	Rep.	
CD Numancia	2–10	CA Osasuna	2 Oct 1984	1–3	Rep.	24 Oct 1984	7–1	Rep.	
Gimnástica de Torrelavega	1–7	Racing de Santander	3 Oct 1984	1–1	Rep.	24 Oct 1984	6–0	Rep.	
Xerez CD	3–6	Sevilla FC	3 Oct 1984	2–5	Rep.	24 Oct 1984	1–1	Rep.	
Atlético Marbella	2–5	CD Málaga	3 Oct 1984	0–1	Rep.	24 Oct 1984	4–2	Rep.	
Hércules CF	8–3	CD Eldense	3 Oct 1984	6–0	Rep.	24 Oct 1984	3–2	Rep.	
CD Binéfar	1–5	Real Zaragoza	3 Oct 1984	0–2	Rep.	24 Oct 1984	3–1	Rep.	
Club Siero	1–18	Sporting de Gijón	3 Oct 1984	1–6	Rep.	25 Oct 1984	12–0	Rep.	Match scheduled for 4 Oct, but played on 5 Oct due to a strike in the city of Gijón.
Real Ávila CF	1–2	Castilla CF	3 Oct 1984	0–1		24 Oct 1984	1–1		
CD Calahorra	0–8	CD Logroñés	3 Oct 1984	0–2		24 Oct 1984	6–0		
Barcelona Amateur	0–1	CE Sabadell FC	3 Oct 1984	0–0	Rep.	24 Oct 1984	1–0	Rep.	
Cultural Leonesa	2–3	UD Salamanca	3 Oct 1984	1–0		24 Oct 1984	3–1		
Deportivo de La Coruña	1–1 (p)	Gran Peña Celtista	3 Oct 1984	1–0		17 Oct 1984	1–0		Penalties: 1–3 for Deportivo de La Coruña.
RSD Alcalá	1–4	Rayo Vallecano	3 Oct 1984	1–2		24 Oct 1984	2–0		
CD Torre Pacheco	1–12	Elche CF	3 Oct 1984	0–4	Rep.	24 Oct 1984	8–1	Rep.	
Cartagena CF	1–4	Albacete Balompié	3 Oct 1984	0–3		10 Oct 1984	1–1		
CF Sporting Mahonés	0–5	RCD Mallorca	3 Oct 1984	0–0		24 Oct 1984	5–0		
CD Mairena	1–3	Recreativo de Huelva	3 Oct 1984	1–0	Rep.	24 Oct 1984	3–0	Rep.	
Granada CF	3–1	AD Ceuta	3 Oct 1984	2–1		24 Oct 1984	0–1		
Celta de Vigo	2–1	CD Lugo	3 Oct 1984	1–0		24 Oct 1984	1–1		
CD Manacor	4–2	CD Badía	3 Oct 1984	2–2		24 Oct 1984	0–2		
CD Fuengirola	1–3	Real Jaén CF	3 Oct 1984	1–2		23 Oct 1984	1–0		
Real Unión	3–7	Sestao SC	3 Oct 1984	3–1		24 Oct 1984	6–0		
Palencia CF	3–1	Atlético Bembibre	3 Oct 1984	1–0		24 Oct 1984	1–2		
Atlético Malagueño	2–5	Linares CF	3 Oct 1984	0–0		24 Oct 1984	5–2		
Pontevedra CF	4–0	Fabril Deportivo	3 Oct 1984	2–0		24 Oct 1984	0–2		
FC Andorra	5–2	UE Sant Andreu	3 Oct 1984	3–1	Rep.	24 Oct 1984	1–2	Rep.	
CD Badajoz	3–1	CD Plasencia	3 Oct 1984	3–1		24 Oct 1984	0–0		
CF Gandía	5–7	CD Alcoyano	3 Oct 1984	2–2		24 Oct 1984	5–3		
CF Lloret	1–3	UE Lleida	3 Oct 1984	1–0	Rep.	24 Oct 1984	3–0	Rep.	
CD Puerto Cruz	3–7	CD Tenerife	3 Oct 1984	1–0		24 Oct 1984	7–2		
Orihuela Deportiva CF	1–1 (p)	CF Lorca Deportiva	3 Oct 1984	1–1		24 Oct 1984	0–0		Penalties: 6–5 for CF Lorca Deportiva.
CD Europa	1–6	RCD Espanyol	4 Oct 1984	0–3	Rep.	16 Oct 1984	3–1	Rep.	
Atlético Madrileño	3–1	CD Manchego	4 Oct 1984	3–0		24 Oct 1984	1–0		
Gimnàstic de Tarragona	2–3	FC Barcelona Atlètic	4 Oct 1984	1–2	Rep.	24 Oct 1984	1–1	Rep.	
CD Burriana	2–7	Valencia CF	9 Oct 1984	2–4	Rep.	24 Oct 1984	3–1	Rep.	
Bilbao Athletic	2–3	Deportivo Alavés	10 Oct 1984	1–1		24 Oct 1984	2–1		
Bye: CD Constància, Real Oviedo Aficionados, UE Figueres, CF Extremadura, CD Corellano, UD Alzira, Athletic Bilbao, Atlético de Madrid, FC Barcelona, Real Betis, Real Madrid CF, Real Valladolid Deportivo.
Results of matches played: September 19 / September 20 / September 26 / September 27 / October 3 / October 4 / October 10 / October 17 / October 24

== Second round ==
Second round
Home 1st leg	Agg.	Home 2nd leg	1st leg			2nd leg			Notes
CD Constància	5–3	CD Murense	1 Nov 1984	4–0		28 Nov 1984	3–1		
AD Parla	4–8	Atlético de Madrid	7 Nov 1984	2–3	Rep.	14 Nov 1984	5–2	Rep.	
Real Betis	3–1	Recreativo de Huelva	7 Nov 1984	3–1	Rep.	28 Nov 1984	0–0	Rep.	
Real Valladolid Deportivo	4–2	UD Salamanca	7 Nov 1984	1–1	Rep.	28 Nov 1984	1–3	Rep.	
Sestao SC	4–2	Racing de Santander	7 Nov 1984	0–0	Rep.	28 Nov 1984	1–2	Rep.	
FC Andorra	0–2	RCD Espanyol	7 Nov 1984	0–1	Rep.	28 Nov 1984	1–0	Rep.	
CD Arnedo	0–6	Real Zaragoza	7 Nov 1984	0–1	Rep.	28 Nov 1984	5–0	Rep.	
Albacete Balompié	2–3 (aet)	Hércules CF	7 Nov 1984	1–1	Rep.	28 Nov 1984	2–1	Rep.	
CD Iliturgi	0–2	CD Málaga	7 Nov 1984	0–0	Rep.	28 Nov 1984	2–0	Rep.	
Endesa Andorra	2–4	CA Osasuna	7 Nov 1984	1–0	Rep.	28 Nov 1984	4–0	Rep.	
SD Eibar	2–6	Athletic Bilbao	7 Nov 1984	1–1	Rep.	13 Nov 1984	5–1	Rep.	
Real Oviedo Aficionados	0–6	Sporting de Gijón	7 Nov 1984	0–1	Rep.	13 Nov 1984	5–0	Rep.	
Atlético Sanluqueño CF	0–2	Sevilla FC	7 Nov 1984	0–0	Rep.	28 Nov 1984	2–0	Rep.	
Levante UD	2–6	Valencia CF	7 Nov 1984	1–4	Rep.	28 Nov 1984	2–1	Rep.	
UE Lleida	3–7	FC Barcelona	7 Nov 1984	3–1	Rep.	27 Nov 1984	6–0	Rep.	
UE Figueres	2–3	CE Sabadell FC	7 Nov 1984	1–3	Rep.	28 Nov 1984	0–1	Rep.	
Granada CF	3–4 (aet)	CD Estepona	7 Nov 1984	1–1		28 Nov 1984	3–2		
Cádiz CF	5–1	Betis Deportivo	7 Nov 1984	2–0	Rep.	28 Nov 1984	1–3	Rep.	
CD Don Benito	2–3	CF Extremadura	7 Nov 1984	1–0		28 Nov 1984	3–1		
Atlético Madrileño	5–3	Calvo Sotelo CF	7 Nov 1984	4–0		28 Nov 1984	3–1		
CD Manacor	0–6	RCD Mallorca	7 Nov 1984	0–1		28 Nov 1984	5–0		
UD Icodense	1–5	CD Tenerife	7 Nov 1984	1–2		28 Nov 1984	3–0		
CD Corellano	3–5	CD Logroñés	7 Nov 1984	2–3		28 Nov 1984	2–1		
UD Güímar	1–2	UD Las Palmas	7 Nov 1984	1–0		21 Nov 1984	2–0		
CF Lorca Deportiva	2–1	CD Ilicitano	7 Nov 1984	1–0		28 Nov 1984	1–1		
FC Barcelona Atlètic	4–2	EC Granollers	7 Nov 1984	3–2	Rep.	28 Nov 1984	0–1	Rep.	
CD Ourense	1–5	Celta de Vigo	7 Nov 1984	1–2		28 Nov 1984	3–0		
CD Pegaso	0–1	Castilla CF	7 Nov 1984	0–0		28 Nov 1984	0–1		
Deportivo de La Coruña	3–3 (p)	Pontevedra CF	7 Nov 1984	3–0		28 Nov 1984	3–0		Penalties: 1–4 for Deportivo de La Coruña.
Mérida Industrial CF	1–5	CD Badajoz	7 Nov 1984	1–1		28 Nov 1984	4–0		
UD Alzira	0–1	CD Castellón	7 Nov 1984	0–1		28 Nov 1984	1–0		
Palencia CF	0–3	Real Valladolid Promesas	8 Nov 1984	0–2		13 Nov 1984	1–0		
Caudal Deportivo	0–1	Real Oviedo CF	8 Nov 1984	0–0		28 Nov 1984	1–0		
Elche CF	2–3	Real Murcia CF	13 Nov 1984	2–1	Rep.	28 Nov 1984	2–0	Rep.	
Real Sociedad	6–1	CD Santurtzi	13 Nov 1984	3–1	Rep.	28 Nov 1984	0–3	Rep.	
Real Jaén CF	2–4	Linares CF	15 Nov 1984	2–3		28 Nov 1984	1–0		
Bye: Rayo Vallecano, Deportivo Alavés, CD Alcoyano, Real Burgos CF, Real Madrid CF.
Results of matches played: November 7 / November 8 / November 15 / November 28

== Third round ==
Third round
Home 1st leg	Agg.	Home 2nd leg	1st leg			2nd leg			Notes
Deportivo Alavés	3–0	Celta de Vigo	12 Dec 1984	1–0		9 Jan 1985	0–2		
CD Alcoyano	0–6	Athletic Bilbao	12 Dec 1984	0–1	Rep.	9 Jan 1985	5–0	Rep.	
CD Badajoz	1–2	Real Oviedo CF	12 Dec 1984	1–1	Rep.	9 Jan 1985	1–0	Rep.	
FC Barcelona	5–1	Real Murcia CF	12 Dec 1984	4–1	Rep.	9 Jan 1985	0–1	Rep.	
FC Barcelona Atlètic	1–2 (aet)	Valencia CF	12 Dec 1984	1–0	Rep.	9 Jan 1985	2–0	Rep.	
Real Burgos CF	1–2	CE Sabadell FC	12 Dec 1984	1–0	Rep.	30 Jan 1985	2–0	Rep.	Match scheduled for 9 Jan, but played on 30 Jan due to snow.
CD Castellón	4–3	CD Logroñés	12 Dec 1984	3–0	Rep.	31 Jan 1985	3–1	Rep.	Match scheduled for 9 Jan, but played on 31 Jan due to snow.
CD Constància	0–3	Sporting de Gijón	13 Dec 1984	0–0		8 Jan 1985	3–0	Rep.	
CF Extremadura	1–7	Cádiz CF	13 Dec 1984	0–3		19 Dec 1984	4–1		
Hércules CF	4–1	CD Estepona	12 Dec 1984	4–0	Rep.	9 Jan 1985	1–0	Rep.	
Linares CF	2–2 (p)	Deportivo de La Coruña	12 Dec 1984	2–1	Rep.	9 Jan 1985	1–0		Penalties: 4–2 for Deportivo de La Coruña.
CF Lorca Deportiva	0–3	Real Sociedad	12 Dec 1984	0–0	Rep.	30 Jan 1985	3–0	Rep.	Match scheduled for Jan 9, but played on Jan 30 due to snow.
CD Málaga	2–4	Atlético de Madrid	12 Dec 1984	0–3	Rep.	9 Jan 1985	1–2	Rep.	
CA Osasuna	1–5	RCD Mallorca	12 Dec 1984	0–2	Rep.	9 Jan 1985	3–1	Rep.	
CD Pegaso	2–4	CD Tenerife	12 Dec 1984	0–0		9 Jan 1985	4–2		
Rayo Vallecano	1–7	UD Las Palmas	11 Dec 1984	1–2		9 Jan 1985	5–0		
Sestao SC	4–3	Atlético Madrileño	12 Dec 1984	2–0		8 Jan 1985	3–2	Rep.	
Sevilla FC	1–3	Real Betis	12 Dec 1984	1–0	Rep.	9 Jan 1985	3–0	Rep.	
Real Valladolid Promesas	1–4	RCD Espanyol	12 Dec 1984	0–4	Rep.	9 Jan 1985	0–1	Rep.	
Real Zaragoza	5–2	Real Valladolid Deportivo	12 Dec 1984	3–1	Rep.	6 Feb 1985	1–2	Rep.	Match scheduled for Jan 9, but played on Feb 6 due to snow.
Bye: Real Madrid CF.
Results of matches played: December 11 / December 12 / December 13 / January 9

== Fourth round ==
Fourth round
Home 1st leg	Agg.	Home 2nd leg	1st leg			2nd leg			Notes
Deportivo Alavés	1–2	Athletic Bilbao	30 Jan 1985	0–0	Rep.	6 Feb 1985	2–1	Rep.	
RCD Espanyol	0–5	FC Barcelona	30 Jan 1985	0–2	Rep.	6 Feb 1985	3–0	Rep.	
UD Las Palmas	1–2 (aet)	Cádiz CF	16 Jan 1985	1–0	Rep.	6 Feb 1985	2–0	Rep.	
Real Oviedo CF	1–4	Real Betis	30 Jan 1985	0–1	Rep.	6 Feb 1985	3–1	Rep.	
Sestao SC	2–3	Sporting de Gijón	30 Jan 1985	1–0	Rep.	6 Feb 1985	3–1	Rep.	
Bye: CD Castellón, CD Tenerife, CE Sabadell FC, Atlético de Madrid, Hércules CF, Deportivo de La Coruña, RCD Mallorca, Real Sociedad, Real Zaragoza, Valencia CF, Real Madrid CF.

== Bracket ==
Round of 16
1	Real Madrid CF	1	0	1
16	Athletic Bilbao	0	2	2
8	Real Sociedad	1	0	1
9	CE Sabadell FC	0	0	0
5	Real Betis	4	1	5
12	RCD Mallorca	0	2	2
4	FC Barcelona	5	0	5
13	Hércules CF	0	1	1
6	Sporting de Gijón (1–4 p)	0	1	1
11	Valencia CF	0	1	1
3	Deportivo de La Coruña	1	2	3
14	Atlético de Madrid	1	5	6
7	CD Castellón	2	2	4
10	CD Tenerife	0	2	2
2	Real Zaragoza (3–5 p)	2	0	2
15	Cádiz CF	1	1	2

Quarter-finals
Athletic Bilbao	2	1	3
Real Sociedad	0	2	2
Real Betis	3	1	4
FC Barcelona	1	2	3
Sporting de Gijón	1	0	1
Atlético de Madrid	2	0	2
CD Castellón	0	0	0
Real Zaragoza	1	5	6

Semi-finals
Athletic Bilbao	2	0	2
Real Betis	0	1	1
Atlético de Madrid	3	1	4
Real Zaragoza	0	3	3

Final
Athletic Bilbao	1
Atlético de Madrid	2

== Round of 16 ==
Team 1	Agg.	Team 2	1st leg	2nd leg
Real Madrid	1–2 (aet)	Athletic Bilbao	1-0	0-2
Real Sociedad	1–0	Sabadell	1-0	0-0
Betis	5–2	Mallorca	4-0	1-2
Barcelona	5–1	Hércules	5-0	0-1
Sporting de Gijón	1–1 (4-1 p)	Valencia	0-0	1-1
Deportivo de La Coruña	3–6	Atlético de Madrid	1-1	2-5
Castellón	4–2	Tenerife	2-0	2-2
Zaragoza	2–2 ( 5-4 p)	Cádiz	2-1	0-1

=== First leg ===
13 March 1985	Real Sociedad	1–0	CE Sabadell FC	San Sebastián
20:00 CET	Uralde 71' (pen.)	Report (in Spanish)		Stadium: Atotxa; Attendance: 13,000; Referee: Benavente Garasa (Basque Country (autonomous community))

13 March 1985	CD Castellón	2–0	CD Tenerife	Castellón de la Plana
20:30 CET	Alcañiz 66', 69'	Report (in Spanish)		Stadium: Castalia; Attendance: — Referee: Albert Giménez (Catalonia)

13 March 1985	Sporting de Gijón	0–0	Valencia CF	Gijón
20:30 CET		Report (in Spanish)		Stadium: El Molinón; Attendance: 20,000; Referee: Pes Pérez (Aragon)

13 March 1985	Deportivo de La Coruña	1–1	Atlético de Madrid	A Coruña
20:30 CET	Brizzola 28'	Report (in Spanish)	Cabrera 16'	Stadium: Riazor; Attendance: 16,000; Referee: Valdés Sánchez (Castile and León)

13 March 1985	Real Zaragoza	1–2	Cádiz CF	Zaragoza
20:45 CET	Corchado 76'	Report (in Spanish)	Amarillo 63', 74'	Stadium: La Romareda; Attendance: 4,500; Referee: Crespo Aurré (Catalonia)

13 March 1985	Real Madrid CF	1–0	Athletic Bilbao	Madrid
21:00 CET	Pineda 82'	Report (in Spanish)		Stadium: Santiago Bernabéu; Attendance: — Referee: Ramos Marcos (Castile and León)

13 March 1985	Real Betis	4–0	RCD Mallorca	Sevilla
21:00 CET	Calleja 7'; Cardeñosa 33'; Calderón 40' (pen.); Rincón 51'	Report (in Spanish)		Stadium: Benito Villamarín; Attendance: — Referee: Crespo Aurré (Catalonia)

13 March 1985	FC Barcelona	5–0	Hércules CF	Barcelona
21:15 CET	Schuster 24'; Gerardo 42'; Marcos Alonso 51'; Alexanko 61', 75'	Report (in Spanish)		Stadium: Camp Nou; Attendance: — Referee: Martín Navarrete (Andalusia)

=== Second leg ===
3 April 1985	Athletic Bilbao	2–0 (a.e.t.)	Real Madrid CF	Bilbao
20:15 CET	Goikoetxea 10'; Julio Salinas 94'	Report (in Spanish)		Stadium: San Mamés; Attendance: — Referee: García de Loza (Galicia (Spain))

3 April 1985	RCD Mallorca	2–1	Real Betis	Palma de Mallorca
20:30 CET	Tolo Ferrer 55'; Bonet 78' (pen.)	Report (in Spanish)	Paco 32'	Stadium: Lluís Sitjar; Attendance: 3,000; Referee: Miguel Pérez (Catalonia)

3 April 1985	Atlético de Madrid	5–2	Deportivo de La Coruña	Madrid
20:30 CET	Cabrera 5', 6'; Julio Prieto 41'; Hugo Sánchez 59' (pen.), 85'	Report (in Spanish)	José Luis 15'; Traba 68'	Stadium: Vicente Calderón; Attendance: 10,000; Referee: Damín Rendón (Andalusia)

3 April 1985	CD Tenerife	2–2	CD Castellón	Santa Cruz de Tenerife
20:30 CET	Lasaosa 6', 45' (pen.)	Report (in Spanish)	Ibeas 49', 64' (pen.)	Stadium: Heliodoro Rodríguez López; Attendance: — Referee: Pino Casado (Castile and León)

3 April 1985	CE Sabadell FC	0–0	Real Sociedad	Sabadell
20:45 CET		Report (in Spanish)		Stadium: Nova Creu Alta; Attendance: — Referee: Pes Pérez (Aragon)

3 April 1985	Valencia CF	1–1 (a.e.t.) (1–4 p)	Sporting de Gijón	Valencia
21:00 CET	Urruti 97'	Report (in Spanish)	Quini 118'	Stadium: Luís Casanova; Attendance: — Referee: Guruceta Muro (Basque Country (autonomous community))
	Penalties
	Ribes (penalty scored); Urruti (penalty missed); Sixto (penalty missed)		(penalty scored) Eloy; (penalty scored) Jiménez; (penalty scored) Zurdi; (penalty scored) Quini

3 April 1985	Hércules CF	1–0	FC Barcelona	Alicante
21:00 CET	Sanabria 49' (pen.)	Report (in Spanish)		Stadium: José Rico Pérez; Attendance: — Referee: Pérez Sánchez (Region of Murcia)

3 April 1985	Cádiz CF	0–1 (3–5 p)	Real Zaragoza	Cádiz
21:00 CET		Report (in Spanish)	Cholo 82'	Stadium: Ramón de Carranza; Attendance: — Referee: Lamo Castillo (Castile and León)
	Penalties
	Mejías I (penalty missed); Generelo (penalty scored); Vojinovic (penalty scored); Amarillo (penalty scored)		(penalty scored) García Cortés; (penalty scored) Corchado; (penalty scored) Señor; (penalty scored) Barbas; (penalty scored) Cholo

== Quarter-finals ==
Team 1	Agg.	Team 2	1st leg	2nd leg
Athletic Bilbao	3–2	Real Sociedad	2-0	1-2
Betis	4–3	Barcelona	3-1	1-2
Sporting de Gijón	1–2	Atlético de Madrid	1-2	0-0
Castellón	0–6	Zaragoza	0-1	0-5

=== First leg ===
17 April 1985	Sporting de Gijón	1–2	Atlético de Madrid	Gijón
20:30 CET	Zurdi 58'	Report (in Spanish)	Marina 2', 69'	Stadium: El Molinón; Attendance: — Referee: Merino González (Canary Islands)

17 April 1985	CD Castellón	0–1	Real Zaragoza	Castellón de la Plana
21:00 CET		Report (in Spanish)	Amarilla 65'	Stadium: Castalia; Attendance: — Referee: Socorro González (Canary Islands)

17 April 1985	Athletic Bilbao	2–0	Real Sociedad	Bilbao
21:00 CET	Dani 25'; Julio Salinas 54'	Report (in Spanish)		Stadium: San Mamés; Attendance: 45,000; Referee: Sánchez Arminio (Cantabria)

17 April 1985	Real Betis	3–1	FC Barcelona	Sevilla
21:00 CET	Rincón 27', 67'; Gordillo 72'	Report (in Spanish)	Calderé 76'	Stadium: Benito Villamarín; Attendance: — Referee: Soriano Aladrén (Castile and León)

=== Second leg ===
15 May 1985	Atlético de Madrid	0–0	Sporting de Gijón	Madrid
17:30 CET		Report (in Spanish)		Stadium: Vicente Calderón; Attendance: 20,000; Referee: Marín López (Navarre)

15 May 1985	FC Barcelona	2–1	Real Betis	Barcelona
21:15 CET	Marcos 61'; Archibald 83'	Report (in Spanish)	Gordillo 45'	Stadium: Camp Nou; Attendance: — Referee: Urízar Azpitarte (Basque Country (autonomous community))

16 May 1985	Real Sociedad	2–1	Athletic Bilbao	San Sebastián
20:00 CET	Uralde 88'; Zamora 89'	Report (in Spanish)	Gallego 22'	Stadium: Atotxa; Attendance: — Referee: Sánchez Arminio (Cantabria)

16 May 1985	Real Zaragoza	5–0	CD Castellón	Zaragoza
20:30 CET	Cholo 9', 39', 77', 86'; García Cortés 69' (pen.)	Report (in Spanish)		Stadium: La Romareda; Attendance: 2,800; Referee: Guruceta Muro (Basque Country (autonomous community))

== Semi-finals ==
Team 1	Agg.	Team 2	1st leg	2nd leg
Athletic Bilbao	2–1	Betis	2-0	0-1
Atlético de Madrid	4–3	Zaragoza	3-0	1-3

=== First leg ===
19 June 1985	Athletic Bilbao	2–0	Real Betis	Bilbao
20:15 CET	De Andrés 35'; Goikoetxea 44'	Report (in Spanish)		Stadium: San Mamés; Attendance: — Referee: Sánchez Molina (Castilla–La Mancha)

19 June 1985	Atlético de Madrid	3–0	Real Zaragoza	Madrid
21:00 CET	Quique Ramos 25'; Cabrera 34'; Mínguez 87'	Report (in Spanish)		Stadium: Vicente Calderón; Attendance: 20,000; Referee: Miguel Pérez (Catalonia)

=== Second leg ===
23 June 1985	Real Zaragoza	3–1	Atlético de Madrid	Zaragoza
20:00 CET	Conde 7'; Casajús 82'; Ayneto 85'	Report (in Spanish)	Hugo Sánchez 67'	Stadium: La Romareda; Attendance: 5,000; Referee: García de Loza (Galicia (Spain))

23 June 1985	Real Betis	1–0	Athletic Bilbao	Sevilla
20:00 CET	Parra 49'	Report (in Spanish)		Stadium: Benito Villamarín; Attendance: — Referee: Merino González (Canary Islands)

== Final ==
30 June 1985
21:00 CET

Athletic Bilbao	1–2	Atlético de Madrid
Julio Salinas 75'	Report (in Spanish)	Hugo Sánchez 24', 54'

Madrid
Stadium: Santiago Bernabéu
Attendance: 85,000
Referee: Miguel Pérez (Catalonia)

Copa del Rey
1984–85 winners
Atlético de Madrid
6th title
