= Corchado =

Corchado is a surname. Notable people with the surname include:

- Alfredo Corchado, Mexican-American journalist and author
- Juan Manuel Corchado (born 1971), Spanish computer scientist
- José Ramón Corchado (born 1957), Spanish footballer
- Manuel Corchado y Juarbe (1840–1884), Puerto Rican poet, journalist and politician
- Martín Corchado (1839–1898), Puerto Rican physician
