= 1986 Copa del Rey final =

Copa del Rey 1986 final
- Event: 1985–86 Copa del Rey
Zaragoza	Barcelona
1	0
- Date: 26 April 1986
- Venue: Vicente Calderón, Madrid
- Referee: Victoriano Sánchez Arminio
- Attendance: 45,000

The 1986 Copa del Rey final was the 84th final of the King's Cup. The final was played at Vicente Calderón Stadium in Madrid, on 26 April 1986, and was won by Zaragoza, who beat Barcelona 1–0.

== Match details ==
26 April 1986
20:30 CET

Zaragoza	1–0	Barcelona
Sosa 34'	Report

Vicente Calderón Stadium, Madrid
Attendance: 45,000
Referee: Victoriano Sánchez Arminio

Zaragoza

Barcelona

GK	1	(Spain) Andoni Cedrún
DF	2	(Spain) Casuco
DF	4	(Spain) Narcís Julià
DF	3	(Spain) Rafael García Cortés
DF	5	(Spain) Juan Carlos
MF	6	(Spain) Francisco Güerri	(yellow card) 57'
MF	8	(Spain) Juan Señor
MF	10	(Spain) Pedro Herrera
FW	7	(Spain) Miguel Pardeza		(substituted off) 90'
FW	9	(Uruguay) Rubén Sosa		(substituted off) 85'
FW	11	(Spain) Francisco Pineda
Substitutes:
DF	12	(Spain) José Antonio Casajús		(substituted on) 85'
GK	13	(Spain) Eugenio Vitaller
FW	14	(Spain) José Ramón Corchado		(substituted on) 90'
MF	15	(Spain) Carlos Conde
FW	16	(Spain) Mariano Ayneto
Manager:
(Spain) Luis Costa

GK	1	(Spain) Urruti
DF	2	(Spain) Tente Sánchez	(yellow card) 75'
DF	3	(Spain) Migueli
DF	6	(Spain) José Ramón Alexanko
DF	4	(Spain) Julio Alberto
MF	11	(Spain) Ramón Calderé
MF	5	(Spain) Víctor
MF	8	(West Germany) Bernd Schuster
MF	10	(Spain) Esteban		(substituted off) 70'
FW	7	(Spain) Francisco José Carrasco		(substituted off) 70'
FW	9	(Spain) Pichi Alonso
Substitutes:
DF	12	(Spain) Gerardo
GK	13	(Spain) Amador
MF	14	(Spain) Marcos Alonso		(substituted on) 70'
FW	15	(Spain) Paco Clos		(substituted on) 70'
MF	16	(Spain) Ángel Pedraza
Manager:
(England) Terry Venables

Match rules

- 90 minutes.
- 30 minutes of extra-time if necessary.
- Penalty shoot-out if scores still level.
- Five named substitutes.
- Maximum of two substitutions.
