= Francisco Güerri =

Spanish footballer (born 1959)

Personal information
- Full name: Francisco José Güerri Ballarín
- Date of birth: 13 April 1959
- Place of birth: Benasque, Spain
- Height: 1.75 m (5 ft 9 in)
- Position: Midfielder

Youth career
- Barbastro
- Robres
- Zaragoza
- Jacetano

Senior career*
Years	Team	Apps	(Gls)
1978	Deportivo Aragón		
1978–1988	Zaragoza	272	(10)
1988–1991	Las Palmas	57	(1)
Total		329	(11)

International career
1979	Spain U21	2	(1)
1980–1983	Spain U23	2	(0)
1983–1984	Spain	3	(0)
- * Club domestic league appearances and goals

Francisco José Güerri Ballarín (born 13 April 1959) is a Spanish former professional footballer who played as a midfielder.

== Club career ==
Born in Benasque, Province of Huesca, Güerri only played for two clubs in his 14-year senior career, starting out at Real Zaragoza in his native Aragon. He made his La Liga debut on 11 February 1979 as a late substitute in a 1–3 home loss against Sporting de Gijón, and scored his first goal on 30 September that year to help the hosts to defeat Real Betis 5–1.

Güerri appeared in 345 competitive games during his spell at the La Romareda. He contributed 12 matches as his team won the 1985–86 edition of the Copa del Rey, including the 1–0 win over FC Barcelona in the final.

Güerri retired in summer 1991 at age 32, after three Segunda División seasons with UD Las Palmas; he had left Zaragoza after clashing with both the board of directors and new manager Radomir Antić.

== International career ==
Güerri was part of Spain's squad in the 1980 Summer Olympics. He appeared in the 1–1 group-stage draw with East Germany, in an eventual exit at the end of that phase.

On 5 October 1983, Güerri won his first cap for the full side, starting the 1–1 friendly draw against France in Paris. He appeared in a further two internationals.

== Honours ==
Zaragoza

- Copa del Rey: 1985–86
