= University of Salamanca =

Public university in Salamanca, Spain

- Universidad de Salamanca
- Seal of the university
- Motto: Omnium scientiarum princeps Salmantica docet (Latin)
- Motto in English: Salamanca is foremost in teaching all the sciences
- Type: Public
- Established: 1218
- Academic affiliations: EUA, Coimbra Group
- Rector: Juan Manuel Corchado
- Faculty: 2,453
- Administrative staff: 1,252
- Students: 30,000
- Doctoral students: 2,240
- Location: Salamanca, Castile and León, Spain; 40°57′41″N 05°40′00″W
- Campus: Urban/College town
- Colours: Carmine
- Website: www.usal.es

University rankings

Global – Overall
- ARWU World: 501–600 (2023)
- QS World: =526 (2026)
- THE World: 801–1000 (2024)
- USNWR Global: =770 (2023)

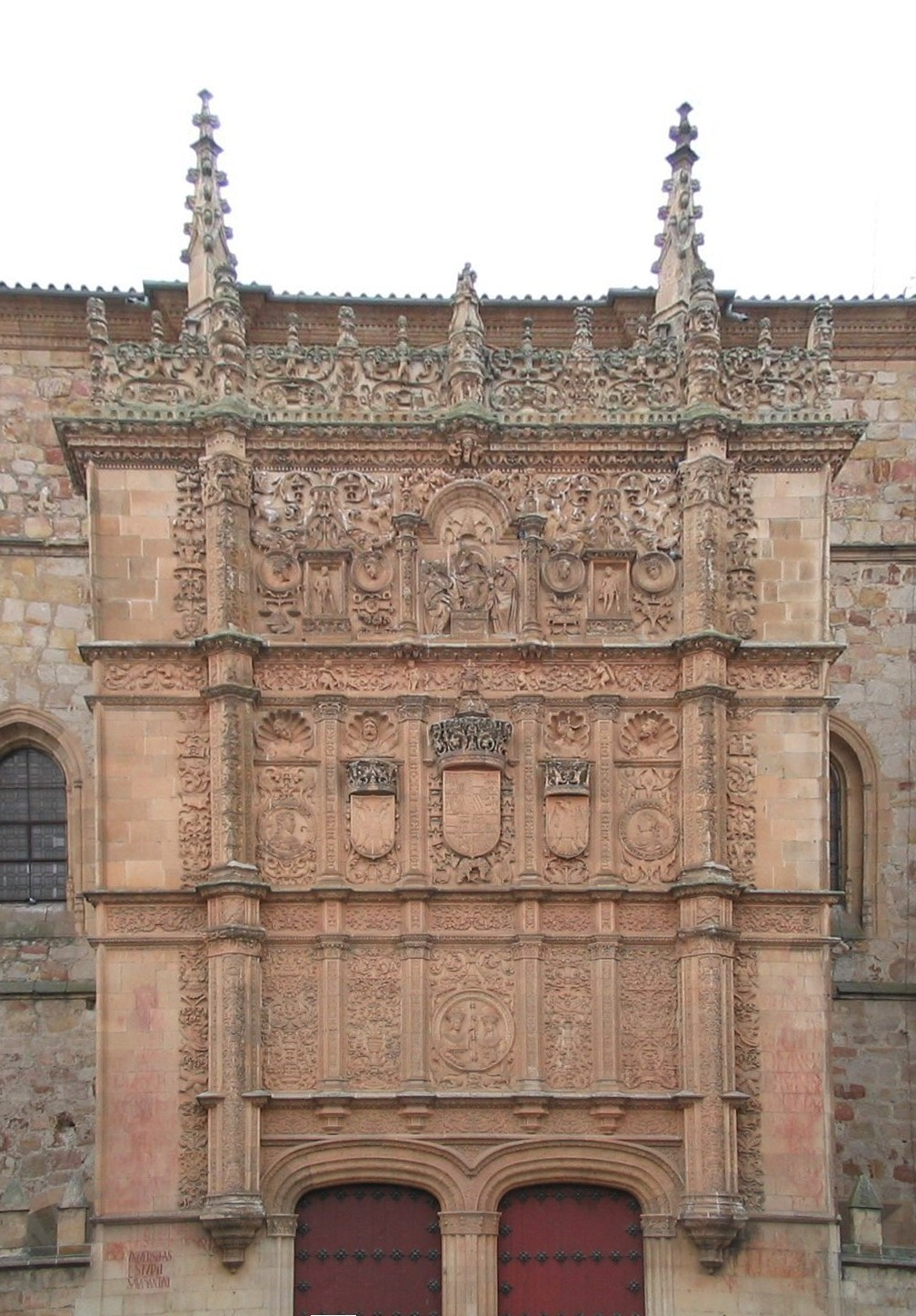
Close up of the plateresque façade of the University of Salamanca.

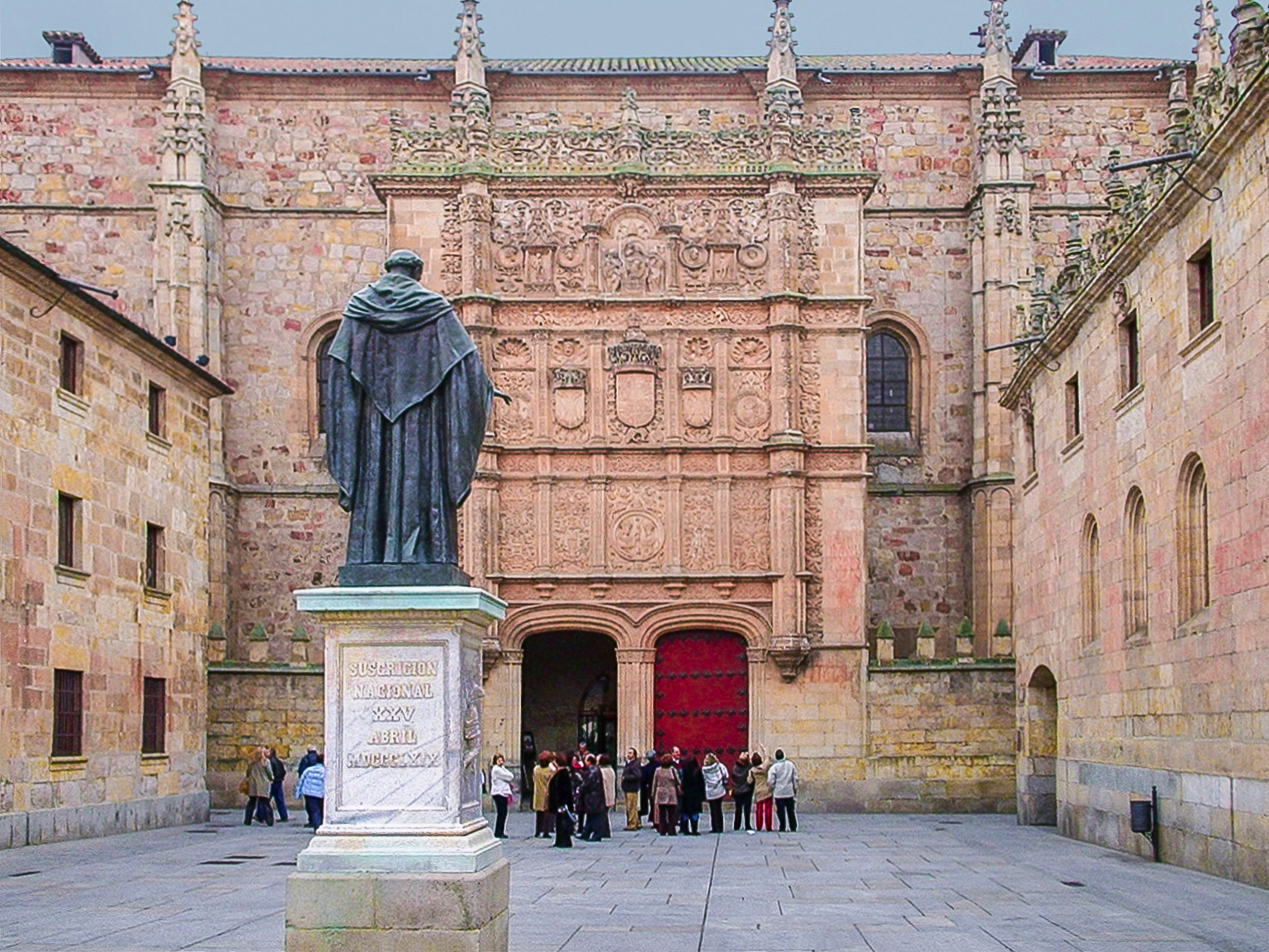
Plateresque façade of the university facing a statue of Fray Luis de León.

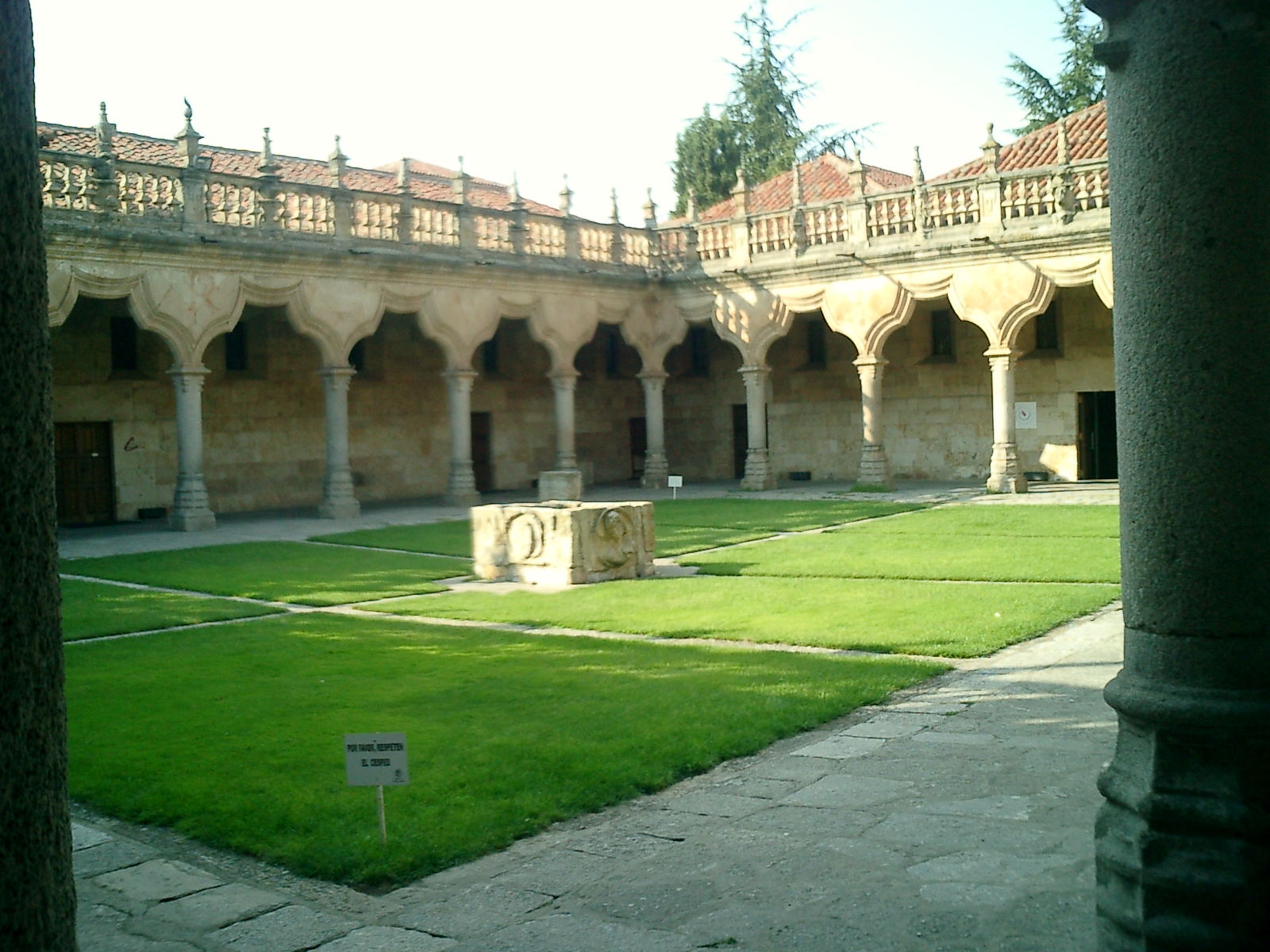
School Courtyard in the university.

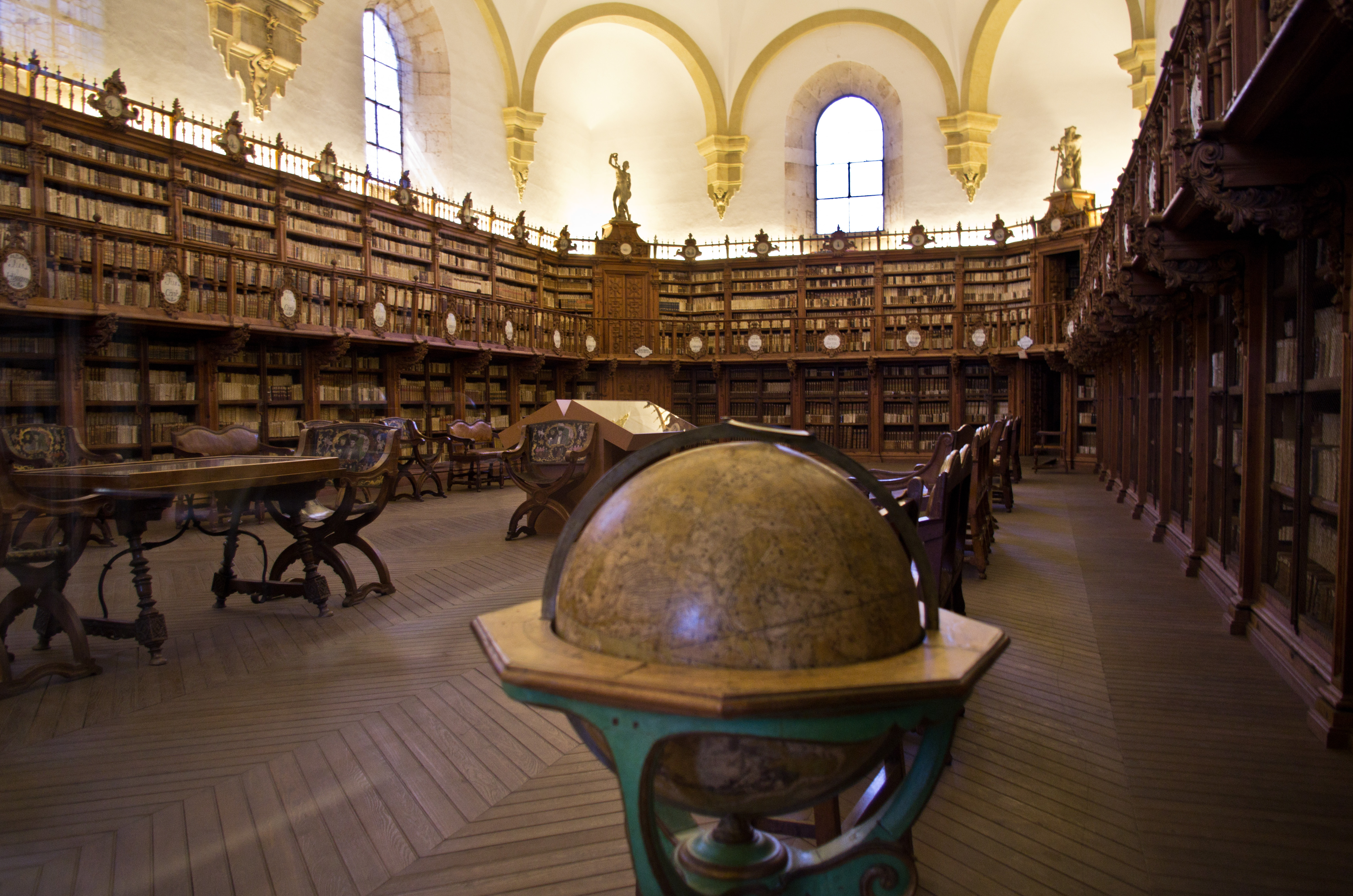
The old library of the University of Salamanca.

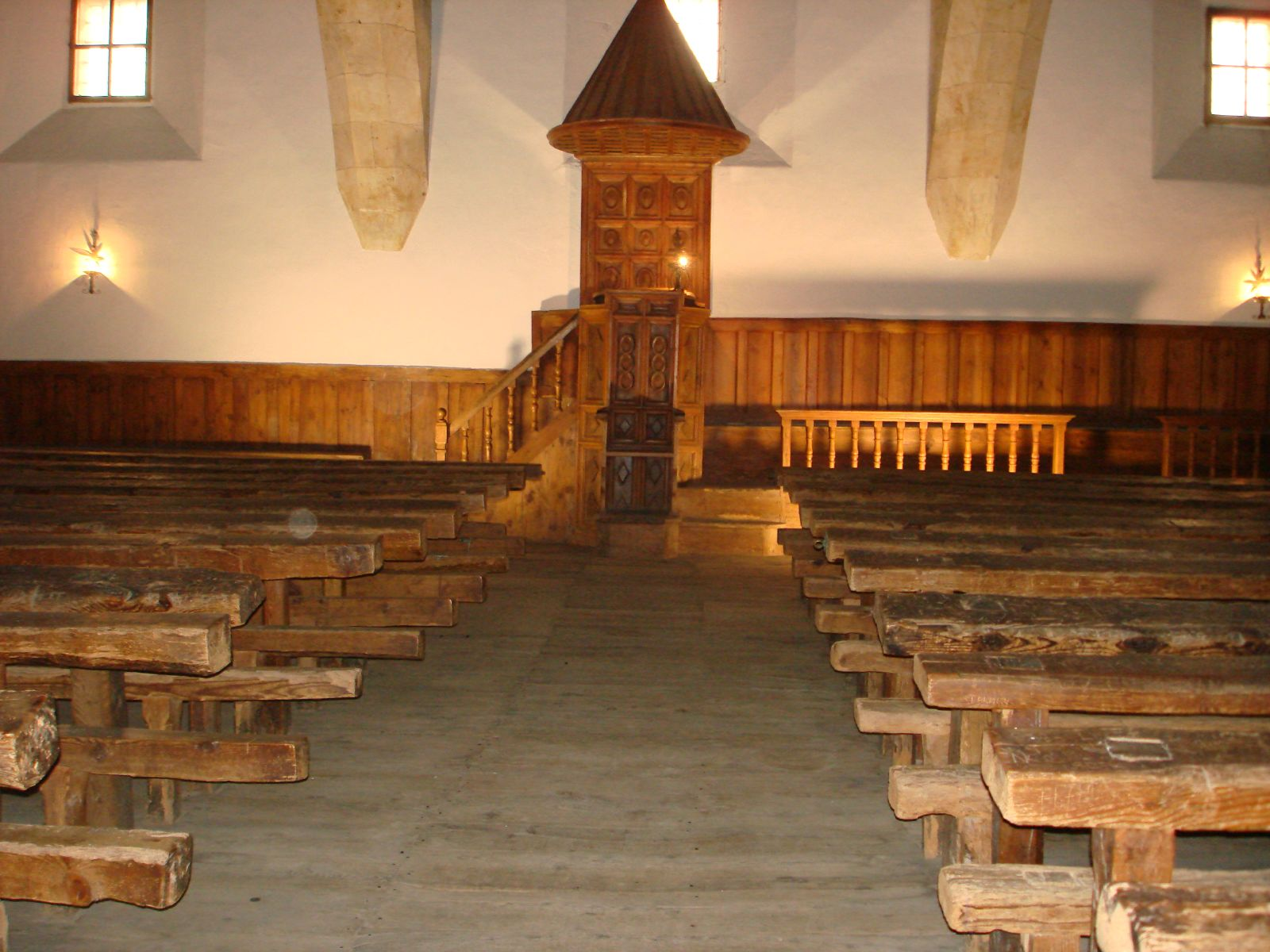
Fray Luis de León's classroom.

The University of Salamanca (Spanish: Universidad de Salamanca) is a public research university in Salamanca, Spain. Founded in 1218 by King Alfonso IX, it is the oldest university in the Hispanic world and the fourth oldest in the world in continuous operation. It has over 30,000 students from 50 nationalities.

== History ==
Prior to the foundation of the university, Salamanca was home to a cathedral school, known to have been in existence by 1130. The university was founded as a studium generale by the Leonese king Alfonso IX in 1218 as the scholas Salamanticae, with the actual creation of the university (or the transformation of the existing school into the university) occurring between August 1218 and the following winter. A further royal charter from King Alfonso X, dated 8 May 1254, established rules for the organisation and financial endowment of the university, and referred to it for the first time by that name. A papal bull of Alexander IV in 1255 confirmed the Royal Charter of Alfonso X and granted universal recognition to the university's degrees.

The historical phrases Quod natura non dat, Salmantica non praestat (what nature does not give, Salamanca does not lend, in Latin) and Multos et doctissimos Salmantica habet (many and very versed Salamanca has) give an idea of the prestige the institution rapidly acquired.

In the reign of King Ferdinand II of Aragon and Queen Isabella I of Castile, the Spanish government was revamped. Contemporary with the Spanish Inquisition, the expulsion of the Jews and Muslims, and the conquest of Granada, there was a certain professionalization of the apparatus of the state. This involved the massive employment of "letrados", i.e., bureaucrats and lawyers, who were "licenciados" (university graduates), particularly, of Salamanca, and the newly founded University of Alcalá. These men staffed the various councils of state, including, eventually, the Consejo de Indias and Casa de Contratacion, the two highest bodies in metropolitan Spain for the government of the Spanish Empire in the New World.

While Columbus was lobbying the King and Queen for a contract to seek out a western route to the Indies, he made his case to a council of geographers at the University of Salamanca. While the geographers were skeptical of Columbus and his voyage calculations, the University of Salamanca always defended the theory of unknown territories to the west, and supported Columbus' voyage, believing that new territories may be discovered. In the next century, the morality and laws of colonization in the Indies were debated by the School of Salamanca, along with the development of the study of science, geography and cartography of the Americas, and as well as the study of general subjects of economics, philosophy and theology.

Salamanca's colleges (Colegios Mayores) were founded as charitable institutions to enable poor scholars to attend the university. By the eighteenth century they had become closed corporations controlled by the families of their founders, and dominated the university between them. Most were destroyed by Napoleon's troops. In the 19th century, the Spanish government dissolved the university's faculties of canon law and theology. They were later reestablished in the 1940s as part of the Pontifical University of Salamanca.

== Related affairs ==
The faculty renovated the theology department, laid the foundation for modern-day law, international law, modern economic science and actively participated in the Council of Trent. The school's mathematicians studied the calendar reform, commissioned by Pope Gregory XIII and proposed the solution that was later implemented. By 1580, 6,500 new students had arrived at Salamanca each year, amongst the graduates were state officials of the Spanish monarchy administration. It was also during this period when the first female university students were probably admitted, Beatriz Galindo and Luisa de Medrano, the latter probably being the first woman ever to give classes at a university.

=== Sorcery ===
In popular belief, the university was associated with sorcery. A certain cave in Salamanca was considered the site of a school of black magic. In Spanish, Salamanca may mean "cave", "an evil iguana" and "hand trick" and the salamanquesa (Tarentola mauritanica, the Spanish name is also derived from "salamander") is a reptile with magical attributes in Spanish tradition. In Romanian folklore, the devil runs a school of black magic named Scholomance.

The name is derived from "Salamanca" and the wise king "Solomon".

== Present day ==
Salamanca draws undergraduate and graduate students from across Spain and the world; it is the top-ranked university in Spain based on the number of students coming from other regions. It is also known for its Spanish courses for non-native speakers, which attract more than two thousand foreign students each year.

Scientific research is carried out in the university and research centers associated with it, such as at the Centro de Investigación del Cáncer [Cancer Research Centre], Instituto de Neurociencias de Castilla y León or INCyL [Institute of Neuroscience of Castile and León], Centro de Láseres Pulsados Ultracortos Ultraintensos [Ultrashort Ultraintense Pulse Lasers Centre]. It is one of only two Hispanophone universities in the world that have a MoU with the United Nations to train language professionals for the organization. In conjunction with the University of Cambridge, the University of Salamanca co-founded the Association of Language Testers in Europe (ALTE) in 1989.

In 2018, the institution celebrated its eighth centennial.

== Library ==
The library holds about 906,000 volumes.

== Notable people ==
=== Notable staff ===
- Juan de Galavís, professor of theology; later became Archbishop of Santo Domingo and Archbishop of Bogotá
- Francisco Elías de Tejada y Spínola, professor of Philosophy of Law and Natural Law
- Enrique Gil Robles, professor of Natural Law
- Pablo de Coronel (d.1534), professor of Hebrew
- Miguel de Unamuno, writer
- Beatriz Galindo, (d. 1534), professor of Latin and rhetoric
- Luisa de Medrano, (d. 1527) the first female professor at the university, teacher of Latin. The secondary school in Salamanca, IES Lucia de Medrano was named after her.
- García de Medrano y Álvarez de los Ríos (d. 1683) professor of Canon law, property, Sextus Decretalium and Clementines
- García de Medrano y Mendizábal, rector of the University of Salamanca in 1669
- Juan Manuel Corchado, computer scientist and rector in 2024 who was involved in publication scandal

=== Notable students ===
- Miguel de Cervantes, author
- Luis de Góngora
- Fray Luis de León
- Francisco de Vitoria
- Pedro Calderón de la Barca
- Bartolomé de Las Casas
- Beatriz Galindo
- Miguel de Unamuno
- Bernardino de Sahagún
- Henry O'Neill
- Flora de Pablo
- Ana Peláez Narváez

Other notable students and academic teachers include:

- Gustavo Petro, President of Colombia
- Roberto Urdaneta Arbeláez, President of Colombia
- Arístides Royo, President of Panama
- Francisco J. Ayala
- Susana Marcos Celestino
- Abraham Zacuto
- Ignacio Baleztena Ascárate
- Esteban de Bilbao Eguía
- Domingo de Soto
- Melchor Cano
- Francisco Suárez
- John of the Cross
- Antonio de Nebrija
- Gaspar de Guzmán, Count-Duke of Olivares
- Gaspar Sanz
- Pedro Gómez Labrador
- Cardinal Mazarin
- Mateo Alemán
- Fredrik Florén, Swedish diplomat
- Diego de Torres Villarroel
- Pedro Salinas
- Adolfo Suárez
- Juan Zarate
- Manuel Belgrano
- Luis de Onís
- Pedro Nunes
- Simón de Rojas
- Antonio Tovar
- Gaspar Cervantes de Gaeta
- Xavier Becerra
- Ángela Abós Ballarín
- Juan Pizarro Navarrete
- Raúl Prieto Ramirez, organist and Civic Organist of the City of San Diego

== See also ==
- School of Salamanca
- Pontifical University of Salamanca
- List of medieval universities

== Literature ==
- Manuel Fernández Álvarez, Luis E. Rodríguez San Pedro & Julián Álvarez Villar, The University of Salamanca, Ediciones Universidad de Salamanca, 1992. ISBN 84-7481-701-3.
