= Flora de Pablo =

Spanish medical research scientist (born 1952)

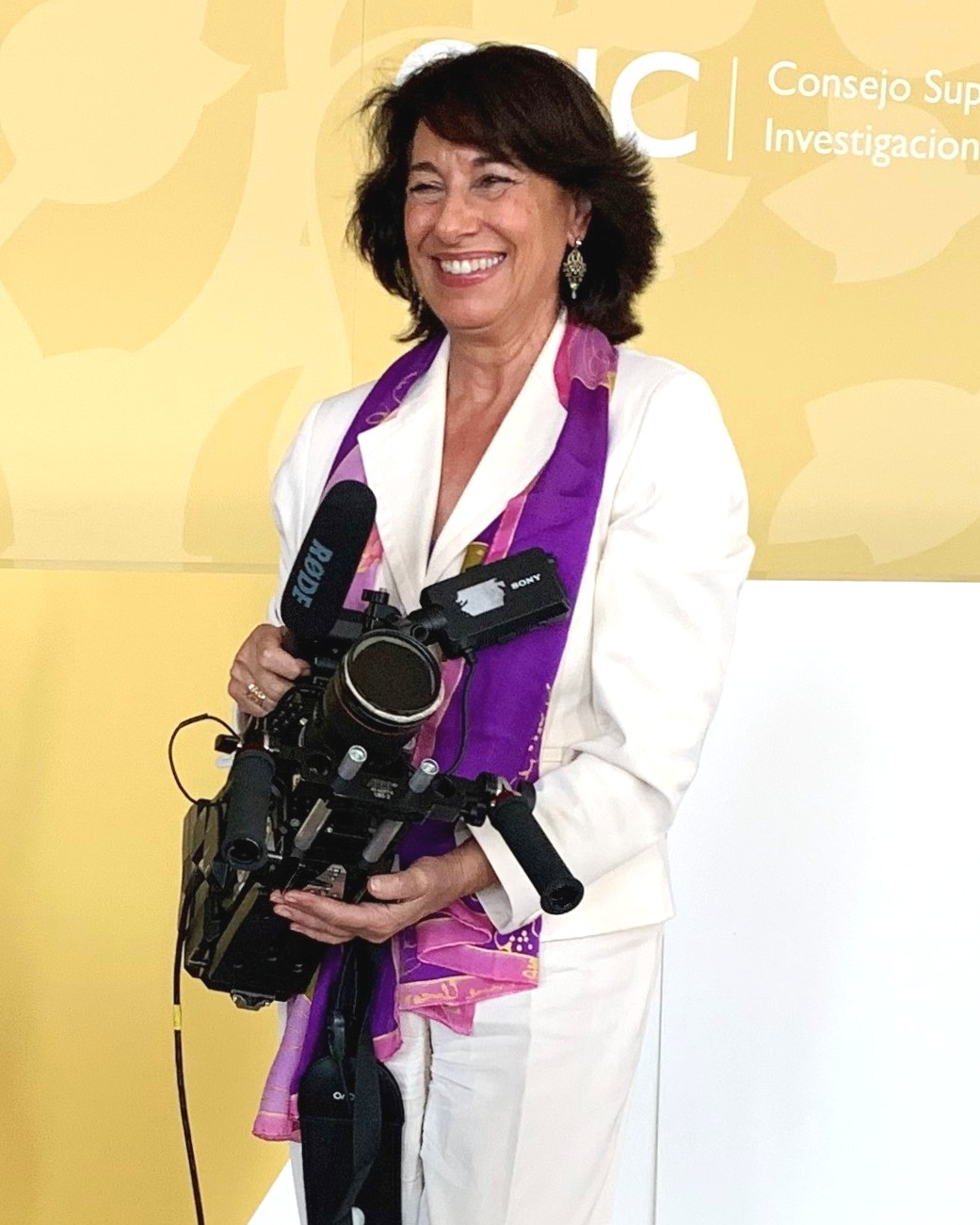
- Born: 25 February 1952; Salamanca, Castilla y León, Spain
- Education: University of Salamanca
- Scientific career
- Fields: Cellular and molecular biology
- Workplaces: Spanish National Research Council

Flora de Pablo (born 25 February 1952) is a Spanish doctor of medicine, specialising in cellular and molecular biology.

== Career ==
She received her degree in medicine in 1975 and continued her studies in psychology at the University of Salamanca. Between 1976 and 1979, she worked as a Resident Medical Intern and did a predoctoral internship in the Pathology Department, Service of Endocrinology, at the University of Salamanca clinical Hospital, where she got her doctorate in Internal Medicine and Endocrinology. She worked for several years in the United States as a researcher (1984–1991 and 1995–1996) for the National Institutes of Health (Bethesda) and for the California Institute of Technology (Caltech, Pasadena). During 1982-1984 she worked as an assistant doctor, in the Service of Endocrinology in the Hospital de la Santa Cruz y San Pablo in Barcelona.

In 1991, she came back to Spain as a research scientist for the Center of Biological Research (CIB) of the Spanish National Research Council (CSIC) in Madrid. Between 2007 and 2008 she was the managing director of the Instituto de Salud Carlos III. She now works as a CSIC research professor for the Cell and Molecular Biology Department of the CIB.

In 2001, she was one of the main founders of the Association of Women Researchers and Technologists, and the chairwoman till 2007. She is concerned about the poor recognition of women's work in scientific and technological areas, as well as the lack of representation in the relevant positions and in the decision-making.

== Research ==
In 1991, she created the research group Factores de Crecimiento en el Desarrollo de Vertebrados, that from 2007 was known as Laboratorio 3D: desarrollo, diferenciación, degeneración. Her research has always been related to Cell and Molecular Biology, the embryonic development, insulin and growth factors, as well as neurogenesis. The team that she manages has specially studied the role of Proinsulin/insulin in the development of the central nervous system.

== Awards and honours ==
- 2001: VIII Premio de Divulgación Feminista Carmen de Burgos, for the article Mujer y Ciencia desde la Europa del Sur granted by the Asociación de Estudios Históricos sobre la Mujer and the Universidad de Málaga.
- 2003: Academic of the Real Academia Nacional de Farmacia.
- 2006–2007: Programme Coordinator of the Alicia Koplowitz Foundation.
- 2007–2009: SET-Routes University Ambassador (UE programme coordinated by the European Molecular Biology Laboratory (EMBL)).
- 2011 and 2012: Taken from The Top 100 Spanish Leader Women .
- 2013: Awarded in the XIV Edition of the Ana Tutor Awards.

== Publications ==
Pablo cowrote over 130 research articles, including:

- Insulin is present in chicken eggs and early chick embryos
- Receptor genes for insulin and insulin-like growth factor I are differentially expressed in Xenopus oocyte and embryos
- The developing CNS: a scenario for the action of proinsulin, insulin and insulin-like growth factors
- Upstream AUGs in embryonic proinsulin mRNA control its low translation level
- Modulation of the PI3Kinase/Akt signalling pathway by IGF-I and PTEN regulates the differentiation of neural stem/precursor cells
