= 1985–86 Copa del Rey =

84th Copa del Rey

Tournament details
- Country: Spain
- Dates: 11 September 1985 – 26 April 1986
- Teams: 142

Final positions
- Champions: Real Zaragoza
- Runner-up: Barcelona

Tournament statistics
- Matches played: 281
- Goals scored: 816 (2.9 per match)

The 1985–86 Copa del Rey was the 84th staging of the Copa del Rey, the annual domestic cup competition in the Spanish football. The tournament was attended by 142 teams from the main categories of Spaniard football.

The tournament began on 11 September 1985 and ended on 26 April 1986 with the final, held in Vicente Calderón Stadium in Madrid.

Real Zaragoza won their third title and got reedit the title after 20 years. The final ended with a 1–0 victory over Barcelona with a solitary goal from Rubén Sosa.

The defending champions, Atlético Madrid, were defeated 2–1 (on the aggregate score) by Barcelona in the quarter-finals.

== Format ==
Schedule
Round	Fixture	Clubs	Gain entry
First round	64	142 → 78	All clubs participating gain entry
Second round	32	78 → 46	Sporting Gijón (*)
Third round	21	46 → 25	Osasuna (*)
Fourth round	9	25 → 16	
Round of 16	8	16 → 8	(*)
Quarter-finals	4	8 → 4	
Semi-finals	2	4 → 2	
Final	1	2 → 1	

Teams
Division	No. clubs
1ª División	18
2ª División	20
2ª División B	26
3ª División	78
Total teams	142

- All rounds are played over two legs except the final which is played a single match in a neutral venue. The team that has the higher aggregate score over the two legs progresses to the next round.
- In case of a tie on aggregate, will play an extra time of 30 minutes, and if still tied, will be decided with a penalty shoot-outs.
- The teams that play European competitions are exempt until the round of 16 or when they are removed from the tournament.
- The winners of the competition will earn a place in the group stage of next season's UEFA Cup Winners' Cup, if they have not already qualified for European competition, if so then the runners-up will instead take this berth.

(*) Teams playing European competition / Athletic Bilbao, Atlético Madrid, Barcelona, Real Madrid started the tournament in the round of 16.

== First round ==
First round
Home 1st leg	Agg.	Home 2nd leg	1st leg			2nd leg			Notes
Júpiter	1–10	Espanyol	11 Sep 1985	0–3	Rep.	18 Sep 1985	7–1	Rep.	
Banyoles	2–1	Andorra	11 Sep 1985	1–0	Rep.	2 Oct 1985	1–1	Rep.	
Europa	2–4	Sabadell	11 Sep 1985	1–2	Rep.	1 Oct 1985	2–1	Rep.	
Villanueva del Arzobispo CF	2–6	Málaga	11 Sep 1985	2–1		18 Sep 1985	5–0		
Eibar	5–2	Cultural Durango	11 Sep 1985	3–0		25 Sep 1985	2–2		
Betis Deportivo	2–8	Xerez	11 Sep 1985	1–3	Rep.	2 Oct 1985	5–1	Rep.	
Leganés	2–6	Calvo Sotelo	18 Sep 1985	2–2		2 Oct 1985	4–0		
Céltiga	1–4	Celta Vigo	18 Sep 1985	0–2	Rep.	2 Oct 1985	2–1	Rep.	
Gimnástica de Torrelavega	1–7	Racing Santander	18 Sep 1985	1–4	Rep.	2 Oct 1985	3–0	Rep.	
Guadalajara	2–3	Rayo Vallecano	18 Sep 1985	1–0		1 Oct 1985	3–1		
Eldense	0–4	Hércules	18 Sep 1985	0–3	Rep.	2 Oct 1985	1–0	Rep.	
Córdoba	2–10	Sevilla	18 Sep 1985	2–6	Rep.	1 Oct 1985	4–0	Rep.	
CD Valdepeñas	1–8	Castilla	18 Sep 1985	1–4		1 Oct 1985	4–0		
Moguer FC	0–5	Real Betis	18 Sep 1985	0–2	Rep.	23 Oct 1985	3–0	Rep.	Match postponed (2nd leg) due to a poisoning of Real Betis players.
UD Telde	1–4	Las Palmas	18 Sep 1985	1–3	Rep.	2 Oct 1985	1–0		
Huesca	2–5	Zaragoza	18 Sep 1985	2–2	Rep.	24 Sep 1985	3–0	Rep.	
Cultural Leonesa	0–10	Real Valladolid Deportivo	18 Sep 1985	0–5	Rep.	2 Oct 1985	5–0	Rep.	
Gandía	1–5	Valencia	18 Sep 1985	1–2	Rep.	2 Oct 1985	3–0	Rep.	
Sporting Gijón Atlético	1–7	Oviedo	18 Sep 1985	0–5		26 Sep 1985	2–1		
Sestao	1–2	Alavés	18 Sep 1985	1–0		2 Oct 1985	2–0		
Lleida	7–1	Barcelona Atlètic	18 Sep 1985	4–1	Rep.	2 Oct 1985	0–3	Rep.	
Yeclano CF	1–6	Real Murcia	18 Sep 1985	0–2		2 Oct 1985	4–1		
Bigastro CF	1–5	Cartagena	18 Sep 1985	1–3		2 Oct 1985	2–0		
Atlético Astorga	1–5	Salamanca	18 Sep 1985	0–1		2 Oct 1985	4–1		
UD Orotava	3–4	Tenerife	18 Sep 1985	2–1		2 Oct 1985	3–1		
Mallorca	7–0	SD Portmany	18 Sep 1985	7–0	Rep.	2 Oct 1985	0–0	Rep.	
Racing Ferrol	2–4	Deportivo La Coruña	18 Sep 1985	2–0		2 Oct 1985	4–0		
Ejea	1–7	Logroñés	18 Sep 1985	1–1		2 Oct 1985	6–0		
Benidorm	2–3	Castellón	18 Sep 1985	2–2		2 Oct 1985	1–0		
Imperial	1–2	Albacete	18 Sep 1985	0–1		2 Oct 1985	1–1		
Villarrobledo	0–3	Elche	18 Sep 1985	0–1		2 Oct 1985	2–0		
Binéfar	3–0	Endesa Andorra	18 Sep 1985	1–0	Rep.	2 Oct 1985	0–2		
Linares	2–3	Granada	18 Sep 1985	1–2		2 Oct 1985	1–1		
Algeciras	1–2	Ceuta	18 Sep 1985	1–0	Rep.	2 Oct 1985	2–0		
Alcorcón	3–1	Real Ávila	18 Sep 1985	2–0		2 Oct 1985	1–1		
Zalla	2–3	Baskonia	18 Sep 1985	0–1		2 Oct 1985	2–2		
Ronda	9–1	Atlético Malagueño	18 Sep 1985	3–0		2 Oct 1985	1–6		
Ponferradina	5–1	Gimnástica Medinense	18 Sep 1985	3–0		2 Oct 1985	1–2		
CD Murense	1–4	Sporting Mahonés	18 Sep 1985	1–1		2 Oct 1985	3–0		
Langreo	4–0	San Martín	18 Sep 1985	3–0		2 Oct 1985	0–1		
Rayo Cantabria	2–3	Castro	18 Sep 1985	1–1		2 Oct 1985	1–2		
Izarra	2–3	Teruel	18 Sep 1985	2–0		2 Oct 1985	3–0		
Burriana	1–2	Alzira	18 Sep 1985	0–1		2 Oct 1985	1–1		
CD Martos	4–5	Polideportivo Almería	18 Sep 1985	3–1		2 Oct 1985	4–1		
Mensajero	4–2	CD San Andrés	18 Sep 1985	3–0		2 Oct 1985	2–1		
Mérida	5–1	Díter Zafra	18 Sep 1985	2–0		2 Oct 1985	1–3		
L'Hospitalet	1–5	Atlético Baleares	18 Sep 1985	1–1		2 Oct 1985	4–0		
Villanovense	1–5	Cacereño	18 Sep 1985	1–0		2 Oct 1985	4–1		
Figueres	5–2	CF Lloret	18 Sep 1985	4–1	Rep.	1 Oct 1985	1–1	Rep.	
Real Valladolid Promesas	1–3	Real Burgos	18 Sep 1985	1–1		2 Oct 1985	2–0		
Arenteiro	0–2	Ourense	18 Sep 1985	0–0		2 Oct 1985	2–0		
Sevilla Atlético	0–4	Real Balompédica Linense	18 Sep 1985	0–0	Rep.	2 Oct 1985	4–0	Rep.	
Extremadura	3–6	CD Plasencia	18 Sep 1985	3–2		2 Oct 1985	4–0		
Melilla FC	0–5	Real Jaén	18 Sep 1985	0–0		2 Oct 1985	5–0		
Lorca Deportiva	6–3	Cieza	18 Sep 1985	3–2		2 Oct 1985	1–3		
Sant Andreu	4–2	Terrassa	18 Sep 1985	3–1	Rep.	1 Oct 1985	1–1	Rep.	
Atlético Madrileño	3–1	Real Madrid Aficionados	19 Sep 1985	2–1		2 Oct 1985	0–1		
Amorebieta	0–5	Real Sociedad	19 Sep 1985	0–3	Rep.	2 Oct 1985	2–0	Rep.	
Mairena	0–11	Cádiz	19 Sep 1985	0–2	Rep.	2 Oct 1985	9–0	Rep.	
Villajoyosa	4–8	Mestalla	19 Sep 1985	4–4		2 Oct 1985	4–0		
Lalín	1–7	Pontevedra	24 Sep 1985	3–0		2 Oct 1985	1–4		
Arnedo	0–7	Deportivo Aragón	26 Sep 1985	0–4		2 Oct 1985	3–0	Rep.	
Barakaldo	4–1	Bilbao Athletic	26 Sep 1985	4–1		2 Oct 1985	0–0		
Pozoblanco	3–6	Recreativo Huelva	26 Sep 1985	1–0		2 Oct 1985	6–2	Rep.	
Bye: Mallorca Atlético, Lugo, Siero, Alcoyano, CD Maspalomas, Orihuela, UD Güímar, Sabiñánigo, Athletic Bilbao, Atlético Madrid, Barcelona, Real Madrid, Osasuna, Sporting Gijón.
Results of matches played: 11 September / 18 September / 19 September / 24 September / 25 September / 26 September / 1 October / 2 October

== Second round ==
Second round
Home 1st leg	Agg.	Home 2nd leg	1st leg			2nd leg			Notes
CD Teruel	1–8	Real Zaragoza	16 Oct 1985	1–5	Rep.	23 Oct 1985	3–0	Rep.	
Atlético Baleares	1–2	Mallorca Atlético	16 Oct 1985	1–2		6 Nov 1985	0–0		
CD Lugo	2–4	Deportivo de La Coruña	22 Oct 1985	1–0		6 Nov 1985	4–1		
UE Figueres	2–4	RCD Espanyol	22 Oct 1985	2–2	Rep.	6 Nov 1985	2–0	Rep.	
Club Siero	1–4	Sporting de Gijón	23 Oct 1985	0–1	Rep.	6 Nov 1985	3–1	Rep.	
SD Ponferradina	1–5	Real Valladolid Deportivo	23 Oct 1985	1–2	Rep.	6 Nov 1985	3–0	Rep.	
CD Ourense	0–1	Celta de Vigo	23 Oct 1985	0–0	Rep.	6 Nov 1985	1–0	Rep.	
Xerez CD	4–2	Cádiz CF	23 Oct 1985	1–1	Rep.	6 Nov 1985	1–3	Rep.	
CD Alcoyano	0–1	Valencia CF	23 Oct 1985	1–1	Rep.	30 Oct 1985	2–1	Rep.	
Racing Santander	3–2 (aet)	Deportivo Alavés	23 Oct 1985	1–0	Rep.	6 Nov 1985	2–2	Rep.	
CD Maspalomas	1–7	UD Las Palmas	23 Oct 1985	1–4	Rep.	6 Nov 1985	3–0	Rep.	
Atlético Madrileño	0–5	Rayo Vallecano	23 Oct 1985	0–2	Rep.	5 Nov 1985	3–0	Rep.	
Real Balompédica Linense	3–4 (aet)	Sevilla FC	23 Oct 1985	2–0	Rep.	6 Nov 1985	4–1	Rep.	
Calvo Sotelo CF	1–6	Castilla CF	23 Oct 1985	0–2	Rep.	6 Nov 1985	4–1		
Cartagena CF	3–4	Orihuela Deportiva CF	23 Oct 1985	1–2		6 Nov 1985	2–2		
Recreativo Huelva	5–1	AD Ceuta	23 Oct 1985	3–0		6 Nov 1985	1–2		
Elche CF	3–4	CF Lorca Deportiva	23 Oct 1985	3–1		6 Nov 1985	3–0		
Granada CF	5–2	Real Jaén CF	23 Oct 1985	3–1		6 Nov 1985	1–2		
UD Güímar	2–3	CD Tenerife	23 Oct 1985	0–1		6 Nov 1985	2–2		
CD Binéfar	2–5	Deportivo Aragón	23 Oct 1985	2–3	Rep.	6 Nov 1985	2–0	Rep.	
UE Sant Andreu	1–12	UE Lleida	23 Oct 1985	1–5	Rep.	6 Nov 1985	7–0	Rep.	
Albacete Balompié	1–7	Real Murcia CF	23 Oct 1985	1–2	Rep.	6 Nov 1985	5–0		
UP Langreo	1–6	Real Oviedo CF	23 Oct 1985	1–2		6 Nov 1985	4–0		
UD Alzira	2–4	CD Castellón	23 Oct 1985	2–1		6 Nov 1985	3–0		
Real Burgos CF	3–2	UD Salamanca	23 Oct 1985	3–1		6 Nov 1985	1–0		
CD Ronda	1–3	CD Málaga	23 Oct 1985	1–0		6 Nov 1985	3–0		
AD Sabiñánigo	1–3	CD Logroñés	23 Oct 1985	1–0		6 Nov 1985	3–0		
RCD Mallorca	5–1	CF Sporting Mahonés	23 Oct 1985	4–0		6 Nov 1985	1–1	Rep.	
CP Cacereño	1–2	CD Plasencia	23 Oct 1985	1–2		6 Nov 1985	0–0		
Barakaldo CF	3–0	Deportivo Rayo Cantabria	23 Oct 1985	2–0		6 Nov 1985	0–1		
SD Eibar	4–1	CD Baskonia	23 Oct 1985	0–0		6 Nov 1985	1–4		
CD Banyoles	1–8	CE Sabadell FC	31 Oct 1985	1–4	Rep.	6 Nov 1985	4–0	Rep.	
Bye: AD Alcorcón, CD Lalín, CD Mensajero, CD Mestalla, Polideportivo Almería, Hércules CF, CP Mérida, Real Betis, Real Sociedad, Athletic Bilbao, Atlético de Madrid, FC Barcelona, Real Madrid CF, CA Osasuna.
Results of matches played: 12 October / 23 October / 6 November

== Third round ==
Third round
Home 1st leg	Agg.	Home 2nd leg	1st leg			2nd leg			Notes
Alcorcón	0–6	Osasuna	13 Nov 1985	0–1	Rep.	27 Nov 1985	5–0	Rep.	
Polideportivo Almería	1–5	Recreativo Huelva	13 Nov 1985	1–4	Rep.	27 Nov 1985	1–0	Rep.	
Deportivo Aragón	2–8	Valencia	13 Nov 1985	1–2	Rep.	27 Nov 1985	6–1	Rep.	
Barakaldo	1–3 (aet)	Castellón	13 Nov 1985	1–0	Rep.	27 Nov 1985	3–0	Rep.	
Real Betis	2–4 (aet)	Mallorca	13 Nov 1985	1–1	Rep.	27 Nov 1985	3–1	Rep.	
Castilla	1–0	Orihuela	13 Nov 1985	1–0	Rep.	27 Nov 1985	0–0	Rep.	
Deportivo La Coruña	1–5	Lleida	13 Nov 1985	0–1	Rep.	27 Nov 1985	4–1	Rep.	
Eibar	1–5	Zaragoza	13 Nov 1985	1–2	Rep.	27 Nov 1985	3–0	Rep.	
Xerez	0–3	Celta Vigo	13 Nov 1985	0–1	Rep.	27 Nov 1985	2–0	Rep.	
Lalín	1–14	Las Palmas	13 Nov 1985	0–3	Rep.	21 Nov 1985	11–1		
Málaga	1–1 (p)	Lorca Deportiva	13 Nov 1985	1–0	Rep.	27 Nov 1985	1–0	Rep.	Penalties: 4–5 for CD Málaga.
Mallorca Atlético	2–3	Hércules	13 Nov 1985	1–1	Rep.	27 Nov 1985	2–1	Rep.	
Mensajero	0–3	Logroñés	13 Nov 1985	0–1	Rep.	19 Nov 1985	2–0	Rep.	
Mérida	2–6	Sevilla	13 Nov 1985	0–2	Rep.	27 Nov 1985	4–2	Rep.	
Mestalla	1–3	Racing Santander	13 Nov 1985	0–3	Rep.	27 Nov 1985	0–1	Rep.	
Real Murcia	1–2	Real Burgos	13 Nov 1985	0–0	Rep.	27 Nov 1985	2–1	Rep.	
Oviedo	4–3	Real Sociedad	13 Nov 1985	2–1	Rep.	27 Nov 1985	2–2	Rep.	
CD Plasencia	2–8	Espanyol	13 Nov 1985	1–5	Rep.	27 Nov 1985	3–1	Rep.	
Sabadell	5–0	Granada	13 Nov 1985	4–0	Rep.	27 Nov 1985	0–1	Rep.	
Real Valladolid Deportivo	0–1 (aet)	Rayo Vallecano	13 Nov 1985	0–0	Rep.	27 Nov 1985	1–0	Rep.	
Tenerife	3–2	Sporting Gijón	13 Nov 1985	2–0	Rep.	27 Nov 1985	2–1	Rep.	
Bye: Athletic Bilbao, Atlético Madrid, Barcelona, Real Madrid.
Results of matches played: 21 November

== Fourth round ==
Fourth round
Home 1st leg	Agg.	Home 2nd leg	1st leg			2nd leg			Notes
Hércules	2–3	Recreativo Huelva	11 Dec 1985	2–1	Rep.	8 Jan 1986	2–0	Rep.	
Las Palmas	3–5	Castellón	11 Dec 1985	1–1	Rep.	8 Jan 1986	4–2	Rep.	
Lleida	2–1	Rayo Vallecano	11 Dec 1985	1–0	Rep.	8 Jan 1986	1–1	Rep.	
Logroñés	2–4 (aet)	Racing Santander	11 Dec 1985	1–1	Rep.	8 Jan 1986	3–1	Rep.	
Osasuna	1–2 (aet)	Real Burgos	11 Dec 1985	1–0	Rep.	8 Jan 1986	2–0	Rep.	
Oviedo	4–3	Espanyol	11 Dec 1985	2–0	Rep.	8 Jan 1986	3–2	Rep.	
Sevilla	1–1 (p)	Mallorca	11 Dec 1985	1–0	Rep.	8 Jan 1986	1–0	Rep.	Penalties: 0–3 for Sevilla FC.
Valencia	1–4	Tenerife	11 Dec 1985	0–1	Rep.	8 Jan 1986	3–1	Rep.	
Zaragoza	3–1	Málaga	11 Dec 1985	2–0	Rep.	14 Jan 1986	1–1	Rep.	Match postponed (2nd leg) due to a poisoning of Málaga players.
Bye: Castilla, Sabadell, Celta Vigo, Athletic Bilbao, Atlético Madrid, Barcelona, Real Madrid.

== Bracket ==
Round of 16
1	Racing Santander	1	0	1
16	Atlético Madrid	0	2	2
8	Lleida	0	0	0
9	Barcelona	1	0	1
5	Tenerife	1	1	2
12	Sabadell	0	5	5
4	Castellón	0	0	0
13	Athletic Bilbao	0	4	4
6	Sevilla	1	0	1
11	Castilla	1	1	2
3	Zaragoza	1	2	3
14	Real Burgos	0	1	1
7	Oviedo	1	1	2
10	Celta Vigo (4–1 p)	1	1	2
2	Real Madrid	5	1	6
15	Recreativo Huelva	0	3	3

Quarter-finals
Atlético Madrid	1	0	1
Barcelona	2	0	2
Sabadell	1	1	2
Athletic Bilbao (3–2 p)	1	1	2
Castilla	2	0	2
Zaragoza	1	7	8
Celta Vigo	0	0	0
Real Madrid	0	4	4

Semi-finals
Barcelona	1	2	3
Athletic Bilbao	0	1	1
Zaragoza	2	2	4
Real Madrid	0	3	3

Final
Barcelona	0
Real Zaragoza	1

== Round of 16 ==
Team 1	Agg.	Team 2	1st leg	2nd leg
Racing Santander	1–2 (aet)	Atlético Madrid	1-0	0-2
Lérida	0–1	Barcelona	0-1	0-0
Tenerife	2–5	Sabadell	1-0	1-5
Castellón	0–4	Athletic Bilbao	0-0	0-4
Sevilla	1–2	Castilla	1-1	0-1
Zaragoza	3–1 (aet)	Real Burgos	1-0	2-1
Oviedo	1–1 (2–4 p)	Celta	1-0	0-1
Real Madrid	6–3	Recreativo Huelva	5-0	1-3

=== First leg ===
15 January 1986	Oviedo	1–0	Celta Vigo	Oviedo
20:15 CET	García Barrero	Report (in Spanish)		Stadium: Carlos Tartiere; Referee: Valdés Sánchez

15 January 1986	Lérida	0–1	Barcelona	Lérida
20:30 CET		Report (in Spanish)	Esteban 39'	Stadium: Camp d'Esports; Attendance: 12,000; Referee: Peraita Ibáñez

15 January 1986	Castellón	0–0	Athletic Bilbao	Castellón de la Plana
20:30 CET		Report (in Spanish)		Stadium: Castalia; Referee: Sánchez Arminio

15 January 1986	Real Madrid	5–0	Recreativo Huelva	Madrid
20:30 CET	Martín Vázquez 12'; Sanchís 18'; Santillana 33', 41'; Sánchez 56' (pen.)	Report (in Spanish)		Stadium: Santiago Bernabéu; Attendance: 20,000; Referee: Pérez Sánchez

15 January 1986	Racing Santander	1–0	Atlético Madrid	Santander
20:30 CET	Víctor 23'	Report (in Spanish)		Stadium: El Sardinero; Attendance: 12,000; Referee: Benavente Garasa

15 January 1986	Tenerife	1–0	Sabadell	Santa Cruz de Tenerife
20:30 CET	Paulo Roberto 29'	Report (in Spanish)		Stadium: Heliodoro Rodríguez López; Attendance: 2,000; Referee: Benavente Garasa

15 January 1986	Sevilla	1–1	Castilla	Sevilla
21:00 CET	Nadal 23'	Report (in Spanish)	Mel 64'	Stadium: Ramón Sánchez Pizjuán; Attendance: 12,000; Referee: Pérez Sánchez

29 January 1986	Zaragoza	1–0	Real Burgos	Zaragoza
17:00 CET	Señor 8'	Report (in Spanish)		Stadium: La Romareda; Attendance: 20,000; Referee: Crespo Aurré

=== Second leg ===
5 February 1986	Athletic Bilbao	4–0	Castellón	Bilbao
20:15 CET	Julio Salinas 5', 52'; Urtubi 14'; Sarabia 66'	Report (in Spanish)		Stadium: San Mamés; Attendance: 20,000; Referee: Lamo Castillo

5 February 1986	Sabadell	5–1	Tenerife	Sabadell
20:30 CET	Perico Alonso 5'; Lino 9', 60'; Merayo 26'; Ribes 76'	Report (in Spanish)	Paulo Roberto 78'	Stadium: Nova Creu Alta; Attendance: 3,000; Referee: Ansuátegui Roca

5 February 1986	Castilla	1–0	Sevilla	Madrid
20:30 CET	Llorente 19'	Report (in Spanish)		Stadium: Santiago Bernabéu; Attendance: 10,000; Referee: Urío Velázquez

5 February 1986	Celta Vigo	1–0 (a.e.t.) (4–1 p)	Oviedo	Vigo
20:30 CET	Maraver 82'	Report (in Spanish)		Stadium: Balaídos; Referee: Valdés Sánchez (Castile and León)
	Penalties
	Mercader (penalty scored); Lucas (penalty scored); Contreras (penalty scored); Miguel (penalty scored)		(penalty scored) Vili; (penalty missed) Muñoz; (penalty missed) Berto

5 February 1986	Recreativo Huelva	3–1	Real Madrid	Huelva
20:45 CET	Cepeda 5' (pen.); Ramón 45'; Alzugaray 89'	Report (in Spanish)	Butragueño 51'	Stadium: Colombino; Referee: Franco Martínez

5 February 1986	Atlético Madrid	2–0 (a.e.t.)	Racing Santander	Madrid
21:00 CET	Da Silva 55'; Setién 101'	Report (in Spanish)		Stadium: Vicente Calderón; Attendance: 9,000; Referee: Bayarri Ribelles

5 February 1986	Barcelona	0–0	Lérida	Barcelona
21:15 CET		Report (in Spanish)		Stadium: Camp Nou; Attendance: 15,000; Referee: Pérez Sánchez

12 February 1986	Real Burgos	1–2 (a.e.t.)	Zaragoza	Burgos
20:30 CET	Molinero 79'	Report (in Spanish)	Señor 97'; García Cortés 113'	Stadium: El Plantío; Referee: Merino González

== Quarter-finals ==
Team 1	Agg.	Team 2	1st leg	2nd leg
Atlético Madrid	1–2	Barcelona	1–2	0–0
Sabadell	2–2 (2–3 p)	Athletic Bilbao	1–1	1–1
Castilla	2–8	Zaragoza	2–1	0–7
Celta Vigo	0–4	Real Madrid	0–0	0–4

=== First leg ===
12 February 1986	Celta Vigo	0–0	Real Madrid	Vigo
20:30 CET		Report (in Spanish)		Stadium: Balaídos; Attendance: 20,000; Referee: Calvo Córdova

12 February 1986	Sabadell	1–1	Athletic Bilbao	Sabadell
21:00 CET	Nacho 90'	Report (in Spanish)	Endika 56'	Stadium: Nova Creu Alta; Referee: Franco Martínez

12 February 1986	Atlético Madrid	1–2	Barcelona	Madrid
21:00 CET	Marina 47'	Report (in Spanish)	Archibald 71'; Carrasco 82'	Stadium: Vicente Calderón; Referee: Valdés Sánchez

20 February 1986	Castilla	2–1	Zaragoza	Madrid
21:15 CET	Mel 39'; Losada 57'	Report (in Spanish)	Señor 65' (pen.)	Stadium: Santiago Bernabéu; Attendance: 7,000; Referee: Pérez Sánchez

=== Second leg ===
26 February 1986	Athletic Bilbao	1–1 (a.e.t.) (3–2 p)	Sabadell	Bilbao
20:15 CET	Urtubi 49' (pen.)	Report (in Spanish)	Perico Alonso 65'	Stadium: San Mamés; Attendance: 25,000; Referee: Álvarez Díaz
	Penalties
	Urtubi (penalty scored); Dani (penalty missed); J. Salinas (penalty scored); P. Salinas (penalty missed); Goikoetxea (penalty scored)		(penalty missed) Periko Alonso; (penalty scored) Lino; (penalty scored) Merayo; (penalty missed) Villa; (penalty missed) Costa

26 February 1986	Zaragoza	7–0	Castilla	Zaragoza
20:30 CET	Sosa 16', 48', 56' (pen.); Pardeza 20', 21'; Casuco 50'; Pineda 67'	Report (in Spanish)		Stadium: La Romareda; Attendance: 20,000; Referee: Peraita Ibáñez

26 February 1986	Real Madrid	4–0	Celta Vigo	Madrid
20:30 CET	Butragueño 20'; Santillana 49', 58', 90'	Report (in Spanish)		Stadium: Santiago Bernabéu; Attendance: 30,000; Referee: Martín Navarrete

26 February 1986	Barcelona	0–0	Atlético Madrid	Barcelona
21:15 CET		Report (in Spanish)		Stadium: Camp Nou; Referee: Benavente Garasa

== Semi-finals ==
Team 1	Agg.	Team 2	1st leg	2nd leg
Barcelona	3–1	Athletic Bilbao	1-0	2-1
Zaragoza	4–3	Real Madrid	2-0	2-3

=== First leg ===
12 March 1986	Zaragoza	2–0	Real Madrid	Zaragoza
21:00 CET	Sosa 13', 26'	Report (in Spanish)		Stadium: La Romareda; Referee: Marín López

12 March 1986	Barcelona	1–0	Athletic Bilbao	Barcelona
21:15 CET	Amarilla 50'	Report (in Spanish)		Stadium: Camp Nou; Referee: Sánchez Arminio

=== Second leg ===
9 April 1986	Athletic Bilbao	1–2	Barcelona	Bilbao
20:15 CET	Goikoetxea 29'	Report (in Spanish)	Schuster 15'; Carrasco 55'	Stadium: San Mamés; Referee: García de Loza

9 April 1986	Real Madrid	3–2	Zaragoza	Madrid
21:00 CET	Valdano 11'; Sanchís 85'; Sánchez 89'	Report (in Spanish)	Pineda 54'; Señor 69'	Stadium: Santiago Bernabéu; Referee: Andújar Oliver

== Final ==
26 April 1986
20:30 CET

Barcelona	0–1	Zaragoza
	Report (in Spanish)	Sosa 35'

Vicente Calderón, Madrid
Attendance: 45,000
Referee: Sánchez Arminio

Copa del Rey
1985–86 winners
Real Zaragoza
3rd title
