= Juan Manuel Corchado =

Juan Manuel Corchado Rodríguez (Note: The family name is Corchado and the second family name is Rodríguez (Spanish naming customs), but he and independent sources mostly use only the first one, Corchado.) (born 15 May 1971) is a Spanish computer scientist and an expert in artificial intelligence at the University of Salamanca, the oldest university in the Hispanic world and the third oldest in the world. He is full professor at the Department of Computer Science and Automation Control, and director of the Bioinformatic, Intelligent Systems and Educational Technology (Bioinformática, Sistemas Informáticos Inteligentes y Tecnología Educativa or BISITE) research group. In 2024, he was appointed rector of the university for a term of six years.

== Investigations into alleged publication misconduct ==
In 2022, Corchado's publications were analysed by Retraction Watch, which found that about 22% of the total citation he received for his publications were from his own research papers, a serious case of excessive self-citation. In 2023, a whistleblower informed Spanish newspaper El País the possible extent of publication misconduct perpetrated by Corchado. A journalistic investigation revealed evidence of several instances on self-citations. Corchado had 8,700 citations in the Web of Science and 45,000 in Google Scholar, many from his own works. In an extreme case, he cited 100 of his own papers in a four-paragraphed article. Some authors who profusely cited his works turned out to be fictitious and were traced back to his own profile. Springer Nature also investigated his papers they published, finding out not only incidences of self-citation but also "unusual citation behavior", he had occasional coercive citations by influencing others, especially researchers from his university, to cite his works. In 2024, the publisher retracted 75 papers related to his papers out of which 14 were his own authorship.
