= Pedro Alcañiz =

Spanish footballer (born 1965)

Personal information
- Full name: Pedro Alcañiz Martínez
- Date of birth: 1 August 1965 (age 61)
- Place of birth: Castellón de la Plana, Spain
- Height: 1.78 m (5 ft 10 in)
- Position: Forward

Senior career*
Years	Team	Apps	(Gls)
1983–1986	Castellón	70	(26)
1986–1989	Valencia	66	(21)
1989–1991	Castellón	54	(13)
1991–1994	Villarreal	56	(17)
1996–1997	Castellón	24	(9)
1997–2001	CF Benlloch		
- Almazora

International career
1986	Spain U21	4	(0)

Managerial career
- CF Benlloch
- * Club domestic league appearances and goals

Pedro Alcañiz Martínez (born 1 August 1965) is a former Spanish footballer who played as a forward.

== Club career ==
Alcañiz began his career at hometown club Castellón, making his debut during the 1983–84 Segunda División season. In 1985–86, Alcañiz was the Segunda División's top scorer, scoring 23 goals. In 1986, Alcañiz signed for Valencia, winning the 1986–87 Segunda División in his first season with the club. Alcañiz stayed with the club for two more seasons, before returning to Castellón in 1989. Alcañiz stayed for two seasons with Castellón in his second stint at the club, making 54 league appearances, scoring 13 La Liga goals. In 1991, Alcañiz signed for Segunda División B club Villarreal, winning promotion to the Segunda División in 1992. At the end of the 1993–94 season, Alcañiz retired, after 246 senior league appearances, scoring 77 goals.

In 1996, Alcañiz came out of retirement for a third spell with Castellón. The following year, Alcañiz became player-manager of CF Benlloch, remaining at the club for four seasons. Alcañiz finished his playing career with Almazora.

== International career ==
Alcañiz represented Spain's under-21's four times in the 1986 UEFA European Under-21 Championship.
