= José Ramón Corchado =

Spanish footballer

Personal information
- Full name: José Ramón Corchado Santiago
- Date of birth: 16 November 1957 (age 68)
- Place of birth: Torrijos, Spain
- Height: 1.72 m (5 ft 8 in)
- Position: Winger

Youth career
- Torrijos
- Atlético Madrid

Senior career*
Years	Team	Apps	(Gls)
1976–1980	Atlético B		
1979–1980	→ Salamanca (loan)	22	(6)
1980–1983	Salamanca	80	(21)
1983–1986	Zaragoza	66	(9)
1986–1988	Hércules	59	(19)
1988–1989	Alcoyano	25	(6)
1989–1991	Toledo	69	(5)
Total		321	(66)

International career
1975–1976	Spain U18	10	(4)
1979	Spain U21	2	(0)

Managerial career
- Toledo (youth)
- 1996–1997: Torrijos
- 1997–1998: Manchego
- 1998–2000: Motril
- 2000–2001: Toledo
- 2001–2002: Cartagonova
- 2002–2003: Zamora
- 2003–2004: Yeclano
- 2004–2005: Tomelloso
- 2008–2009: Zamora B
- 2009: Fuenlabrada
- 2010–2012: Torrijos
- * Club domestic league appearances and goals

José Ramón Corchado Santiago (born 16 November 1957) is a Spanish retired footballer who played as a right winger, and is a manager.

He played 140 La Liga games for Salamanca and Zaragoza, scoring 25 goals, while achieving 87 appearances and 30 goals in Segunda División B for Salamanca and Hércules. A Copa del Rey winner with Zaragoza in 1986, he never managed higher than Segunda División B, but achieved a cup win for Toledo over Real Madrid in 2000.

== Playing career ==
Born in Torrijos in the province of Toledo, Corchado moved from his hometown club CD Torrijos to Atlético Madrid as a teenager. Having been advised by manager Luis Aragonés that his first-team prospects were slim, he moved to fellow La Liga club UD Salamanca on loan in 1979, before joining permanently in exchange for Balbino García.

Salamanca manager Manolo Villanova recommended Corchado to Real Zaragoza manager Leo Beenhakker, and he transferred in 1983. On 10 February 1985 he scored the winning goal in the club's first victory at Real Madrid's Santiago Bernabéu Stadium; he was also in the team that won the Copa del Rey in 1985–86 with a 1–0 win over FC Barcelona in the final.

Corchado wound down his career in Segunda División with Hércules CF and Segunda División B with CD Alcoyano and local club CD Toledo. He was the captain of Hércules and Toledo.

== Managerial career ==
Corchado began coaching in the youth ranks of Toledo, before returning to Torrijos and subsequently leading CD Manchego, CF Motril and Toledo in the third tier. On 13 December 2000, in the last 64 of the Copa del Rey, he guided Toledo to a 2–1 home win over Vicente del Bosque's Real Madrid.

After being dismissed and replaced at Toledo by José Aurelio Gay in February 2001, Corchado managed Cartagonova FC, Zamora CF and others.
