= Rafael García Cortés =

Spanish footballer

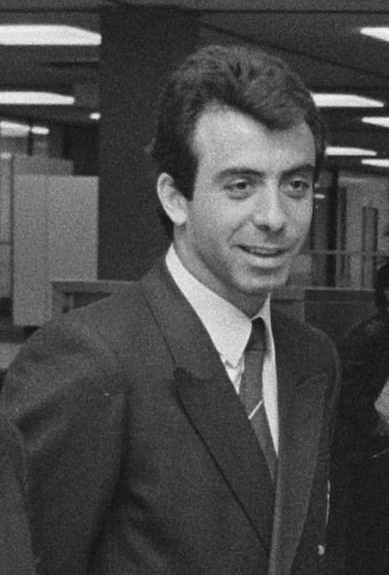
- García Cortés in 1987

Personal information
- Full name: Rafael García Cortés
- Date of birth: 18 January 1958 (age 68)
- Place of birth: Madrid, Spain
- Height: 1.78 m (5 ft 10 in)
- Position: Defender

Youth career
- 1968–1977: Real Madrid

Senior career*
Years	Team	Apps	(Gls)
1977–1979	Castilla	30	(2)
1979–1982	Real Madrid	58	(5)
1979–1980	→ Burgos (loan)	29	(2)
1983–1987	Zaragoza	148	(11)
1987–1990	Mallorca	92	(7)
1990–1993	Rayo Vallecano	89	(16)
Total		446	(43)

International career
1975–1976	Spain U18	10	(0)
1977	Spain U20	3	(0)
1979	Spain U21	2	(0)
1980	Spain U23	1	(0)
1980	Spain amateur	1	(0)

Managerial career
- 1997: Tenerife (interim)
- * Club domestic league appearances and goals

Rafael García Cortés (born 18 January 1958) is a Spanish retired footballer who played as a defender.

He amassed La Liga totals of 312 games and 24 goals, having played mainly for Real Madrid and Zaragoza.

== Club career ==
Born in Madrid, García Cortés competed in 12 La Liga seasons during his 16-year professional career, having started with Real Madrid Castilla in Segunda División. In the top flight he represented Real Madrid (three and a half years), Burgos CF (one season, loaned), Real Zaragoza (four and a half seasons, having arrived at the club in January 1983), RCD Mallorca (two years) and Rayo Vallecano (1992–93), retiring at the age of 35 with the latter.

García Cortés competed in the 1980–81 European Cup with Real Madrid – during his spell at the Santiago Bernabéu Stadium, he was part of the team dubbed Madrid of the Garcías– appearing in four matches and starting in three: in the final against Liverpool, his 82nd-minute mistake whilst attempting a clearance enabled Alan Kennedy to score the game's only goal in Paris.

After retiring, García Cortés returned to Real as youth system coordinator.

== Honours ==
Real Madrid

- La Liga: 1978–79
- Copa del Rey: 1981–82

Zaragoza

- Copa del Rey: 1985–86
