= Victoriano Sánchez Arminio =

Spanish football referee (1942–2023)

- Born: 26 June 1942; Santander, Spain
- Died: 21 May 2023 (aged 80); Santander, Spain
- Occupation: Football referee

Victoriano Sánchez Arminio (26 June 1942 – 21 May 2023) was a Spanish football referee. He notably officiated the Copa del Rey, the 1984 Summer Olympics, the 1985 FIFA World Youth Championship, 1986 FIFA World Cup, and the 1988–89 UEFA Cup.
