= 1970–71 Valencia CF season =

Valencia CF
1970–71 season
- President: Julio De Miguel
- Manager: Alfredo Di Stefano
- Stadium: Luis Casanova
- Primera Division: Winners (in 1971–72 European Cup)
- Copa del Generalisimo: Runners-up
- Inter-Cities Fairs Cup: 1st round
- Top goalscorer: League: José Vicente Forment (8); All: José Vicente Forment (14)
Home colours	Away colours

During the 1970–71 Spanish football season, Valencia CF competed in La Liga, Fairs Cup and the Copa del Generalisimo.

During summer, President Julio de Miguel appointed Argentine ex-Forward Alfredo Di Stefano as its new manager. Also from Argentina arrived striker Rubén Óscar Valdez transferred out by Platense. In a 4-team-title-race involving also FC Barcelona, Atlético Madrid and Real Madrid the squad won its fourth league championship ever after Real Madrid shattered its trophy chances on Round 26 with a lost match 0–2 in Vigo against Celta and, a photo-finished last round 30 thanks to the draw game between Atlético Madrid and FC Barcelona despite the squad lost (0–1) against Español at Sarriá with the tie-breaker criteria favouring Valencia.

After the team clinched their first league trophy since 1947, the squad lost the 1971 Copa del Generalisimo Final by a 3–4 score against FC Barcelona.

== Squad ==
Note: Flags indicate national team as defined under FIFA eligibility rules; some limited exceptions apply. Players may hold more than one non-FIFA nationality.

No.	Pos.	Nation	Player
—	GK	ESP	Abelardo
—	GK	ESP	Cota
—	GK	ESP	José Manuel Pesudo
—	DF	PAR	Aníbal Perez
—	DF	ESP	Antón Martínez
—	DF	ESP	Fernando Barrachina
—	DF	ESP	Jesús Martínez
—	DF	ESP	Juan Sol
—	DF	ESP	Tatono
—	DF	ESP	Francisco Vidagany
—	MF	ESP	Pep Claramunt
—	MF	ESP	Paquito García
—	MF	ESP	Roberto Gil

No.	Pos.	Nation	Player
—	FW	ESP	Fernando Ansola
—	FW	ESP	Enrique Claramunt
—	FW	PAR	Vicente Jara
—	FW	ESP	José Vicente Forment
—	FW	ESP	José Ramón Fuertes
—	FW	ESP	José Nebot
—	FW	ESP	Carlos Pellicer
—	FW	ESP	Poli
—	FW	ESP	Sergio Manzanera
—	FW	ESP	Uriarte
—	FW	ARG	Ruben Oscar Valdez

=== Transfers ===
In
Pos.	Name	from	Type
FW	Sergio Manzanera	Levante	
FW	Uriarte	Athletic Bilbao	
FW	Carlos Pellicer	Barcelona	
FW	Rubén Óscar Valdez	Platense	
FW	Enrique Claramunt	Mestalla	
GK	Cota	Mestalla	
FW	José Vicente Forment	Mestalla	

Out
Pos.	Name	To	Type
FW	Waldo Machado	Hercules CF	
FW	Vicente Guillot	Elche CF	
MF	Cayuela		
MF	Enrique Collar		
MF	Illumbe		

== Competitions ==
=== Primera Division ===
==== League table ====
Pos	Team	Pld	W	D	L	GF	GA	GD	Pts	Qualification or relegation
1	Valencia (C)	30	18	7	5	41	19	+22	43	Qualification for the European Cup first round
2	Barcelona	30	19	5	6	50	22	+28	43	Qualification for the Cup Winners' Cup first round (Note: Barcelona qualified to the Cup Winners' Cup as champions of the Copa del Generalísimo.)
3	Atlético Madrid	30	17	8	5	51	20	+31	42	Qualification for the UEFA Cup first round
4	Real Madrid	30	17	7	6	46	24	+22	41	Qualification for the UEFA Cup first round
5	Atlético Bilbao	30	14	7	9	40	31	+9	35	Qualification for the UEFA Cup first round

Source: BDFútbol
Rules for classification: 1) Points; 2) Head-to-head results; 3) Goal difference; 4) Number of goals scored
(C) Champions

==== Position by round ====
Round	1	2	3	4	5	6	7	8	9	10	11	12	13	14	15	16	17	18	19	20	21	22	23	24	25	26	27	28	29	30
Ground	A	H	H	A	H	A	H	A	H	A	H	A	H	A	H	H	A	A	H	A	H	A	H	A	H	A	H	A	H	A
Result	L	W	L	D	D	W	W	W	W	D	W	L	W	W	W	W	D	D	W	D	W	W	D	L	W	W	W	W	W	L
Position	15	7	11	10	8	6	4	4	3	3	3	3	3	3	3	2	2	3	1	1	1	1	1	2	1	1	1	1	1	1

Source: www.lfp.es
A = Away; H = Home; W = Win; D = Draw; L = Loss; = 1971-72 European Cup; = 1971-72 UEFA Cup; = 1971-72 Segunda Division

==== Matches ====
12 September 1970 1	Real Madrid	2 – 0	Valencia	Madrid
	Pirri 4'; Pirri 65'			Stadium: Santiago Bernabeu; Referee: Urrestarazu Elordi

19 September 1970 2	Valencia	5 – 1	UD Las Palmas	Valencia
	Ansola 18'; Poli 21'; Ansola 47'; Poli 59'; Ansola 74'		77' German	Stadium: Luis Casanova; Referee: Pintado Viu

26 September 1970 3	Valencia	0 – 1	Sevilla FC	Valencia
			64' Acosta	Stadium: Luis Casanova; Referee: Oliva Fortuny

04 October 1970 4	Granada CF	2 – 2	Valencia	Granada
	Juarez 16'; Barrios 47'		27' (pen.) Pep Claramunt; 78' Ansola	Stadium: Los Cármenes; Referee: Soto Montesinos

11 October 1970 5	Valencia	0 – 0	Real Sociedad	Valencia
				Stadium: Luis Casanova; Referee: Camacho Jiménez

17 October 1970 6	Sporting de Gijón	0 – 1	Valencia	Gijón
			85' Anibal Perez	Stadium: El Molinón; Referee: Tomeo Palanques

25 October 1970 7	Valencia	1 – 0	Málaga CF	Valencia
	Jose Vicente Forment 40'			Stadium: Luis Casanova; Referee: Martín Álvarez

31 October 1970 8	FC Barcelona	0 – 2	Valencia	Barcelona
	Marti Filosia (penalty missed) 53'		11' Pep Claramunt; 83' Oscar Ruben Valdez	Stadium: Camp Nou; Referee: Orrantia Capelastegui

15 November 1970 9	Valencia	1 – 0	Atlético Madrid	Valencia
	Sergio Manzanera 70'			Stadium: Luis Casanova; Referee: Vilanova Pericas

22 November 1970 10	Athletic Bilbao	0 – 0	Valencia	Bilbao
				Stadium: San Mamés; Referee: Soto Montesinos

29 November 1970 11	Valencia	2 – 0	Real Zaragoza	Valencia
	Paquito Garcia 43'; Jose Vicente Forment 55'			Stadium: Luis Casanova; Referee: Rigo Sureda

06 December 1970 12	Celta Vigo	1 – 0	Valencia	Vigo
	Jimenez 30'			Stadium: Balaidos; Referee: Pintado Viu

13 December 1970 13	Valencia	2 – 1	CE Sabadell	Valencia
	CarlosPellicer 21'; Pep Claramunt 65'		4' Garzon; (red card) 45' Isidro	Stadium: Luis Casanova; Referee: Navarrete Antiñolo

20 December 1970 14	Elche CF	1 – 3	Valencia	Elche
	Curro 54'		37' Jose Vicente Forment; 85' Carlos Pellicer; 86' Sergio Manzanera	Stadium: Altabix; Referee: Saiz Elizondo

27 December 1970 15	Valencia	2 – 1	Español	Valencia
	Enrique Claramunt 60'; Forment 73'		62' Re	Stadium: Luis Casanova; Referee: Soto Montesinos

03 January 1971 16	Valencia	1 – 0	Real Madrid	Valencia
	Forment 31'			Stadium: Luis Casanova; Referee: Franco Martínez

10 January 1971 17	UD Las Palmas	0 – 0	Valencia	Las Palmas
				Stadium: Insular; Referee: Ortiz de Mendibil

17 January 1971 18	Sevilla FC	2 – 2	Valencia	Seville
	Pazos 56'; Acosta 70'		26' Sergio Manzanera; 66' Oscar Ruben Valdez	Stadium: Sanchez Pizjuan; Referee: Pintado Viu

24 January 1971 19	Valencia	2 – 1	Granada CF	Valencia
	Paquito Garcia 20'; Forment 77'		49' Barrios	Stadium: Luis Casanova; Referee: Gómez Platas

31 January 1971 20	Real Sociedad	0 – 0	Valencia	San Sebastián
				Stadium: Atotxa; Referee: Franco Martínez

07 February 1971 21	Valencia	1 – 0	Sporting de Gijón	Valencia
	Anibal Perez 56'			Stadium: Luis Casanova; Referee: Soto Montesinos

14 February 1971 22	Málaga CF	0 – 1	Valencia	Málaga
	Alvarez (penalty missed) 9'		75' Carlos Pellicer	Stadium: La Rosaleda; Referee: Guruceta Muro

28 February 1971 23	Valencia	1 – 1	FC Barcelona	Valencia
	Paquito Garcia 34'		17' Rexach	Stadium: Luis Casanova; Referee: Orrantia Capelastegui

06 March 1971 24	Atlético de Madrid	3 – 0	Valencia	Madrid
	Garate 36'; Ufarte 58'; Aragones 66'		(yellow card) 70' Anton	Stadium: Vicente Calderon; Referee: Medina Iglesias

14 March 1971 25	Valencia	4 – 0	Athletic Bilbao	Valencia
	Oscar Ruben Valdez 36'; Jose Vicente Forment 53'; Sergio Manzanera 68'; Enrique Claramunt 70'			Stadium: Luis Casanova; Referee: Tomeo Palanques

21 March 1971 26	Real Zaragoza	0 – 2	Valencia	Zaragoza
			46' Pep Claramunt; 83' Anton	Stadium: La Romareda; Referee: Franco Martínez

28 March 1971 27	Valencia	2 – 1	Celta Vigo	Valencia
	Enrique Claramunt 30'; Jose Vicente Forment 89'		50' Lezcano	Stadium: Luis Casanova; Referee: Gómez Platas

04 April 1971 28	CE Sabadell	0 – 1	Valencia	Valencia
			89' Anton	Stadium: Nova Creu Alta; Referee: Martínez Banegas

11 April 1971 29	Valencia	3 – 0	Elche CF	Valencia
	Oscar Ruben Valdez 20'; Oscar Ruben Valdez 39'; Enrique Claramunt 88'			Stadium: Luis Casanova; Referee: Serrano Sancristóbal

18 April 1971 30	Español	1 – 0	Valencia	Barcelona
	Lamata 65'			Stadium: Sarriá; Referee: Franco Martínez

=== Copa del Generalisimo ===
==== Final ====
4 July 1971	FC Barcelona	4–3 (a.e.t.)	Valencia	Madrid
21:00 CET	Fusté 51'; Zabalza 71', 100'; Alfonseda 113'	Report (in Spanish)	21' (pen.)Claramunt I 48' Paquito; 102' Valdez	Stadium: Santiago Bernabéu Stadium; Attendance: 100,000; Referee: Juan María Sáiz Elizondo

== Statistics ==
=== Players statistics ===
No.	Pos	Nat	Player	Total		La Liga		Copa		Fairs Cup	
No.	Pos	Nat	Player	Apps	Goals	Apps	Goals	Apps	Goals	Apps	Goals
	GK	(Spain) ESP	Abelardo	42	-29	30	-19	9	-8	3	-2
	DF	(Paraguay) PAR	Aníbal Perez	40	3	30	2	6	1	4	0
	DF	(Spain) ESP	Antón Martínez	36	2	30	2	3	0	3	0
	DF	(Spain) ESP	Juan Sol	38	0	29	0	5	0	4	0
	MF	(Spain) ESP	Pep Claramunt	43	11	30	4	9	5	4	2
	MF	(Spain) ESP	Paquito García	39	5	27	3	9	2	3	0
	FW	(Spain) ESP	José Vicente Forment	36	14	24+2	8	7+1	5	2	1
	FW	(Spain) ESP	Sergio Manzanera	42	7	30	4	7+1	1	4	2
	FW	(Spain) ESP	Carlos Pellicer	27	3	21+1	3	1+1	0	3	0
	FW	(Spain) ESP	Enrique Claramunt	32	5	15+7	4	3+5	1	1+1	0
	FW	(Argentina) ARG	Oscar Valdez	27	5	18	5	7	0	2	0
	GK	(Spain) ESP	Cota	1	-1	0	0	0+1	-1		
	DF	(Spain) ESP	Tatono	18	0	14+2	0	0	0	1+1	0
	DF	(Spain) ESP	Jesús Martínez	17	0	9	0	7	0	1	0
	DF	(Spain) ESP	Francisco Vidagany	17	0	7	0	7	0	2+1	0
	FW	(Spain) ESP	Poli	20	0	5+9	0	2+1	0	3	0
	FW	(Spain) ESP	Fernando Ansola	15	5	5+1	4	6	1	1+2	0
	DF	(Spain) ESP	Fernando Barrachina	14	1	2+2	0	8	0	1+1	1
	FW	(Spain) ESP	José Ramón Fuertes	8	1	2+2	0	3+1	1		
	FW	(Spain) ESP	Uriarte	2	0	1+1	0				
	FW	(Spain) ESP	José Nebot	2	0	1	0	0	0	0+1	0
	GK	(Spain) ESP	Pesudo	1	-1	0	0	0	0	1	-1
	MF	(Spain) ESP	Roberto Gil								
	FW	(Paraguay) PAR	Vicente Jara	2	1	0	0	0	0	1+1	1
