= 1971 Copa del Generalísimo final =

Copa del Generalísimo 1971 final
- Event: 1970–71 Copa del Generalísimo
Barcelona	Valencia
4	3
- Date: 4 July 1971
- Venue: Santiago Bernabéu, Madrid
- Referee: Juan María Sáiz Elizondo
- Attendance: 100,000

The Copa del Generalísimo 1971 final was the 69th final of the King's Cup. The final was played at Santiago Bernabéu Stadium in Madrid, on 4 July 1971, being won by FC Barcelona, who beat Valencia 4–3 in the extra-time.

== Details ==
4 July 1971
21:00 CET

Barcelona	4–3 (a.e.t.)	Valencia
Fusté 51'; Zabalza 71', 100'; Alfonseda 113'	Report (in Spanish)	Claramunt I 21' (pen.); Paquito 48'; Valdez 102'

Santiago Bernabéu Stadium, Madrid
Attendance: 100,000
Referee: Juan María Sáiz Elizondo

Barcelona

Valencia

GK	1	(Spain) Miguel Reina Santos
DF	2	(Spain) Joaquim Rifé (c)
DF	3	(Spain) Eladio
DF	4	(Spain) Antonio Torres
DF	5	(Spain) Gallego
MF	6	(Spain) Enrique Álvarez Costas
FW	7	(Spain) Carles Rexach
MF	8	(Spain) Marcial	(substituted off) 31'
FW	9	(Spain) Teófilo Dueñas	(substituted off) 65'
MF	10	(Spain) Pedro María Zabalza Inda
FW	11	(Spain) Juan Manuel Asensi Ripoll
Substitutes:
MF	12	(Spain) José María Fusté	(substituted on) 31'
FW	14	(Spain) Ramón Alfonseda	(substituted on) 65'
Manager:
(England) Vic Buckingham

GK	1	(Spain) Abelardo
DF	2	(Spain) Juan Cruz Sol	(red card) 71'
DF	3	(Spain) Fernando Barrachina
DF	4	(Spain) Jesús Martínez
DF	5	(Spain) Francisco Vidagany
MF	6	(Spain) Claramunt I
MF	7	(Spain) Sergio		(substituted off) 78'
MF	8	(Spain) Poli
FW	9	(Spain) Fernando Ansola		(substituted off) 78'
FW	10	(Spain) Paquito (c)
FW	11	(Spain) Óscar Valdez
Substitutes:
FW	12	(Spain) José Vicente Forment		(substituted on) 78'
FW	14	(Spain) Claramunt II		(substituted on) 78'
Manager:
(Argentina) Alfredo Di Stéfano
