= 1972 Copa del Generalísimo final =

Copa del Generalísimo 1972 final
- Event: 1971–72 Copa del Generalísimo
Atlético Madrid	Valencia
2	1
- Date: 8 July 1972
- Venue: Santiago Bernabéu, Madrid
- Referee: José María Ortiz de Mendíbil
- Attendance: 100,000

The Copa del Generalísimo 1972 final was the 70th final of the King's Cup. The final was played at Santiago Bernabéu Stadium in Madrid, on 8 July 1972, being won by Atlético Madrid, who beat Valencia 2–1.

== Match details ==
8 July 1972
20:30 CET

Atlético Madrid	2–1	Valencia
Salcedo 31'; Gárate 62'	Report	Valdez 36'

Santiago Bernabéu Stadium, Madrid
Attendance: 100,000
Referee: José María Ortiz de Mendíbil

Atlético Madrid

Valencia

GK	1	(Spain) Rodri
DF	2	(Spain) Jesús Martínez Jayo
DF	3	(Argentina) Iselín Santos Ovejero
DF	4	(Spain) Isacio Calleja (c)
DF	5	(Spain) Ignacio Salcedo
DF	6	(Spain) Julio Iglesias
MF	7	(Spain) Luis Aragonés
MF	8	(Spain) Adelardo
MF	9	(Spain) Javier Irureta
FW	10	(Spain) José Eulogio Gárate	(substituted off) 71'
FW	11	(Spain) José Armando Ufarte
Substitutes:
FW	12	(Spain) Julio Orozco	(substituted on) 71'
Manager:
(Austria) Max Merkel

GK	1	(Spain) Juan Luis Meléndez
DF	2	(Spain) Francisco Vidagany
DF	3	(Spain) Fernando Barrachina
DF	4	(Spain) Antón
DF	5	(Spain) Jesús Martínez
MF	6	(Spain) Juan Sol (c)
MF	7	(Spain) Lico
FW	8	(Spain) Sergio	(substituted off) 46'
FW	9	(Spain) Rubén Valdez
FW	10	(Argentina) Miguel Ángel Adorno
FW	11	(Spain) Quino
Substitutes:
MF	12	(Spain) José Claramunt	(substituted on) 46'
Manager:
(Argentina) Alfredo Di Stéfano

== See also ==
Played between same teams:

- 1999 Copa del Rey final
