= 1970 Copa del Generalísimo final =

Copa del Generalísimo 1970 final
- Event: 1969–70 Copa del Generalísimo
| Real Madrid | Valencia |
| 3 | 1 |
- Date: 28 June 1970
- Venue: Camp Nou, Barcelona
- Referee: José María Ortiz de Mendíbil
- Attendance: 80,000

The Copa del Generalísimo 1970 final was the 68th final of the King's Cup. The final was played at Camp Nou in Barcelona, on 28 June 1970, being won by Real Madrid, who beat Valencia 3–1.

== Match details ==
28 June 1970
20:00 CET

| Real Madrid | 3–1 | Valencia |
|---|---|---|
| Pirri 34' (pen.); Planelles 60'; Fleitas 65' | Report (in Spanish) | Jara 38' (pen.) |

Camp Nou, Barcelona
Attendance: 80,000
Referee: José María Ortiz de Mendíbil

Real Madrid
Valencia

| GK | 1 | (Spain) Andrés Junquera |
| DF | 2 | (Spain) José Luis |
| DF | 3 | (Spain) Gregorio Benito |
| DF | 4 | (Spain) Ignacio Zoco |
| DF | 5 | (Spain) Manuel Sanchís |
| MF | 6 | (Spain) Toni Grande |
| MF | 7 | (Spain) Pirri |
| MF | 8 | (Spain) Manuel Velázquez |
| FW | 9 | (Spain) Amancio | (substituted off) 19' |
| FW | 10 | (Spain) Ramón Grosso | (substituted off) 10' |
| FW | 11 | (Spain) Francisco Gento (c) |
Substitutes:
| FW | 12 | (Paraguay) Sebastián Fleitas | (substituted in) 10' |
| MF | 14 | (Spain) Juan Planelles | (substituted in) 19' |
Manager:
(Spain) Miguel Muñoz

| GK | 1 | (Spain) Abelardo |
| DF | 2 | (Spain) Tatono |
| DF | 3 | (Paraguay) Aníbal Pérez |
| DF | 4 | (Spain) Juan Sol |
| DF | 5 | (Spain) Antón |
| MF | 6 | (Spain) Claramunt I |
| MF | 7 | (Spain) Paquito (c) |
| FW | 8 | (Spain) José Nebot |
| FW | 9 | (Paraguay) Vicente Jara |
| FW | 10 | (Spain) Poli | (substituted off) 71' |
| FW | 11 | (Spain) Fernando Ansola |
Substitutes:
| FW | 12 | (Spain) José Ramón Fuertes | (substituted in) 71' |
Manager:
(Spain) Enrique Buqué
