= 1967 Copa del Generalísimo final =

Copa del Generalísimo 1967 final
- Event: 1967 Copa del Generalísimo
Valencia	Atlético Bilbao
2	1
- Date: 2 July 1967
- Venue: Santiago Bernabéu, Madrid
- Referee: Jaime Oliva
- Attendance: 100,000

The Copa del Generalísimo 1967 final was the 65th final of the King's Cup. The final was played at Santiago Bernabéu in Madrid, on 2 July 1967, being won by Valencia CF, who beat Club Atlético de Bilbao 2–1.

== Match details ==
2 July 1967
20:00 CET

Valencia	2–1	Atlético Bilbao
Jara 45'; Paquito 55'	Report	Argoitia 63'

Santiago Bernabéu Stadium , Madrid
Attendance: 100,000
Referee: Jaime Oliva

Valencia

Atlético Bilbao

GK	1	(Spain) Abelardo
DF	2	(Spain) Juan Sol
DF	3	(Spain) Manuel Mestre
DF	4	(Spain) Tatono
MF	5	(Spain) Paquito
MF	6	(Spain) Roberto (c)
FW	7	(Spain) Poli
FW	8	(Spain) Vicente Guillot
FW	9	(Brazil) Waldo
FW	10	(Spain) José Claramunt
FW	11	(Paraguay) Vicente Jara
Manager:
(Spain) Mundo

GK	1	(Spain) José Ángel Iribar
DF	2	(Spain) José Orúe (c)
DF	3	(Spain) Luis María Echeberría
DF	4	(Spain) Jesús Aranguren
MF	5	(Spain) Luis María Zugazaga
MF	6	(Spain) José Larrauri
FW	7	(Spain) Iñaki Sáez
FW	8	(Spain) José Argoitia
FW	9	(Spain) Antón Arieta
FW	10	(Spain) Fidel Uriarte
FW	11	(Spain) Txetxu Rojo
Manager:
(Spain) Agustín Gaínza
