= 1966 Troféo Simón Bolívar =

1966 Small Club World Cup
Tournament details
- Host country: Venezuela
- Dates: June 24 – July 3
- Teams: 3 (from 3 associations)
- Venue: 1 (in 1 host city)

Final positions
- Champions: (Spain) Valencia (1st title)

Tournament statistics
- Matches played: 6
- Goals scored: 15 (2.5 per match)

The 1966 Troféo Simón Bolívar was the 9th edition of the Small Club World Cup, a tournament held in Venezuela between 1952 and 1957, in certain years between 1963 and 1970, and in 1975. It was played as a double round-robin tournament. It was organized and held in Venezuela.

== Participants ==
- (Portugal) Vitoria Guimarães
- (Spain) Valencia CF
- (Italy) SS Lazio

== Venues ==
All matches were played at the Estadio Olímpico in Caracas, Venezuela.

== Matches ==
Jun 24

Vitória de Guimarães (Portugal)	3–1	(Italy) Lazio
Mendes 18'; Peres 40'; Castro 70'	Report	Renna 70' (pen.)

Estadio Olímpico, Caracas
Referee: Ortega (Venezuela)

Jun 26

Lazio (Italy)	0–1	(Spain) Valencia
	Report	Waldo 63'

Estadio Olímpico, Caracas
Referee: Iglesias (Venezuela)

Jun 27

Vitória de Guimarães (Portugal)	1–3	(Spain) Valencia
Castro 43'	Report	García 40'; Guillot 51'; Ansola 70'

Estadio Olímpico, Caracas
Referee: Varrone (Venezuela)

Jun 30

Vitória de Guimarães (Portugal)	1–1	(Italy) Lazio
Djalma 46'	Report	Sassaroli 67'

Estadio Olímpico, Caracas
Referee: Osorio (Venezuela)

Jul 2

Valencia (Spain)	1–0	(Italy) Lazio
Waldo 36'	Report

Estadio Olímpico, Caracas
Referee: Rodríguez (Venezuela)

Jul 3

Vitória de Guimarães (Portugal)	0–3	(Spain) Valencia
	Report	Claramunt 19'; Sol 49'; Burgos 72'

Estadio Olímpico, Caracas
Referee: Osorio (Venezuela)

== Final standings ==
Team	Pts	P	W	D	L	GF	GA	GD
(Spain) Valencia CF	8	4	4	0	0	8	1	7
(Portugal) Vitória Guimarães	3	4	1	1	2	5	8	-3
(Italy) SS Lazio	2	4	0	1	3	2	6	-4

== Topscorers ==
2 goal

- (Brazil) Waldo
- (Portugal) Castro

1 goal

- (Spain) Fernando Ansola
- (Spain) Ernesto Burgos
- (Spain) José Claramunt
- (Spain) Paquito García
- (Brazil) Djalma Freitas
- (Spain) Vicente Guillot
- (Portugal) Mendes
- (Portugal) Peres
- (Italy) Antonio Renna
- (Italy) Gianni Sassaroli
- (Spain) Juan Sol
