= 1974 FIFA World Cup qualification – UEFA Group 7 =

Group 7 consisted of three of the 32 teams entered into the European zone: Greece, Spain, and Yugoslavia. These three teams competed on a home-and-away basis for one of the 9.5 spots in the final tournament allocated to the European zone, with the group's winner claiming the place in the finals. This group required a play-off to decide the winner.

As of 2026, this was the last time Spain failed to qualify for the World Cup finals.

== Standings ==
Rank	Team	Pld	W	D	L	GF	GA	GD	Pts
1=	Spain	4	2	2	0	8	5	+3	6
1=	Yugoslavia	4	2	2	0	7	4	+3	6
3	Greece	4	0	0	4	5	11	−6	0

== Matches ==
19 October 1972

Spain	2–2	Yugoslavia
Amancio 30'; Asensi 89'		Bajević 52', 60'

Las Palmas, Spain
Referee: Walker (England)

18 November 1972

Yugoslavia	1–0	Greece
Aćimović 14'

Belgrade, Yugoslavia
Referee: Tschenscher (West Germany)

17 January 1973

Greece	2–3	Spain
Koudas 56'; Domazos 81'		Valdez 40', 86'; Claramunt 65'

Athens, Greece
Referee: Glöckner (East Germany)

21 February 1973

Spain	3–1	Greece
Claramunt 29'; Sol 39'; Martínez 78'		Antoniadis 37'

Málaga, Spain
Referee: Kitabdjian (France)

21 October 1973

Yugoslavia	0–0	Spain

Zagreb, Yugoslavia
Referee: Linemayr (Austria)

19 December 1973

Greece	2–4	Yugoslavia
Eleftherakis 29'; Katalinski 44' (o.g.)		Bajević 12'; Karasi 15', 90'; Šurjak 62'

Athens, Greece
Referee: Tschenscher (West Germany)

Spain and Yugoslavia finished level on points and goal difference, and a play-off on neutral ground was played to decide who would qualify.

13 February 1974

Yugoslavia	1–0	Spain
Katalinski 13'

Frankfurt, West Germany
Referee: Loraux (Belgium)
