= Claramunt =

Claramunt is a surname. Notable people with the surname include:

- Empar Claramunt (1954–2021), Spanish puppeteer
- Enrique Claramunt (born 1948), Spanish footballer
- José Claramunt (born 1946), Spanish footballer
- Lluís Claramunt (1951–2000), Catalan artist
- Teresa Claramunt (1862–1931), Catalan Spanish anarcho-syndicalist
