= Tatono =

Spanish association football player

Personal information
- Full name: José Antonio Garciá Conesa
- Date of birth: 5 May 1940 (age 86)
- Place of birth: Torre-Pacheco, Spain
- Height: 1.71 m (5 ft 7 in)
- Position: Right back

Senior career*
Years	Team	Apps	(Gls)
1960–61	Cartagenera		
1961–1965	Murcia	97	(2)
1965–1972	Valencia	110	(1)
1972–74	Levante	13+	(0+)
1974–1975	Algemesí		
Total		220+	(3+)
- * Club domestic league appearances and goals

José Antonio García Conesa (born 5 May 1940), known as Tatono, is a Spanish former footballer who played as a right back.

He made 163 La Liga appearances for Murcia and Valencia, winning the Copa del Generalísimo in 1967 and the league title in 1971 with the latter.

== Career ==
Born in Torre-Pacheco in the Region of Murcia, Tatono played for Cartagenera in the Tercera División in 1960–61. He then moved to nearby Real Murcia of the Segunda División, playing five years including two in La Liga. He scored one of his two top-flight goals on 1 March 1964, a long-range strike in the fourth minute of a 2–2 draw at home to Elche.

Tatono totalled 146 games for Valencia between 1965 and 1972. On 2 July 1967, he played the final of the Copa del Generalísimo, a 2–1 win over Atlético Bilbao in the Santiago Bernabeu Stadium. He scored his only goal for the Che on 22 September 1968, beginning a 4–1 win over Granada at the Mestalla Stadium.

On 28 June 1970, Tatono played a second cup final, a 3–1 loss to Real Madrid. He was part of the Valencia side that won the league title in 1970–71 under manager Alfredo Di Stéfano; the defence of Tatono, Juan Sol, Antón Martínez and Aníbal Pérez was known as the muralla blanca ("White Wall").

Having been injured in his final season, Tatono was released at the end of his contract in July 1972 and said that he felt physically sick at leaving Valencia after seven years. Remaining in the same city he joined third-tier Levante, experiencing promotion and relegation in his two seasons and finishing his career at Algemesí.
