= Aníbal Pérez (footballer) =

Paraguayan footballer

Personal information
- Full name: Julián Aníbal Pérez Miers
- Date of birth: 19 June 1944 (age 82)
- Place of birth: Itá, Paraguay
- Height: 1.76 m (5 ft 9 in)
- Position: Centre back

Youth career
- 1961: Sportivo Iteño
- 1962: Olimpia

Senior career*
Years	Team	Apps	(Gls)
1963–1968	Cerro Porteño		
1968–1975	Valencia	119	(5)
1975–1976	Valladolid	20	(1)
1977	Cerro Porteño		
1978	Deportivo Pereira		
Total		139+	(6+)

International career
1964	Paraguay U20		
1964–1968	Paraguay	13	(0)
- * Club domestic league appearances and goals

Julián Aníbal Pérez Miers (born 19 June 1944) is a Paraguayan former footballer who played as a centre back.

He began his senior career at Cerro Porteño, winning the Paraguayan Primera División in 1966 and 1977. He played 155 games across all competitions for Valencia in Spain, winning La Liga in 1970–71. He also played for Real Valladolid for one season in the Segunda División.

Pérez was part of the Paraguay under-20 side that finished runners-up at the 1964 South American U-20 Championship. He then played for the senior team up to 1968.

== Career ==
=== Early career ===
Born in Itá in the Central department, Pérez played for one season at Sportivo Iteño, before moving to the capital Asunción and playing for one year at Club Olimpia. In 1963, still a youth player, he arrived at Cerro Porteño.

Pérez was part of the Paraguay under-20 team at the 1964 South American U-20 Championship in Colombia, finishing as runners-up to Uruguay. He and other players then broke into the first team at Cerro Porteño, who had won the Paraguayan Primera División in 1963 and were playing in the Copa Libertadores for 1964.

In 1966, Cerro Porteño won the league again, with Pérez a regular in defence. He also made his senior debut for the Paraguay national team, filling in at left back due to injuries.

=== Valencia ===
In 1968, Pérez was called up for Paraguay for the Taça Oswaldo Cruz against Brazil. After losing the first game 4–0, the Albiroja won 1–0 in the second game on 28 July, with Pérez being praised in the national press for his performance against Pelé. After having previously been linked with RCD Español, where compatriot Cayetano Ré was playing, Pérez transferred to Valencia CF of the Spanish La Liga in late August, for a fee of 2.5 million Spanish pesetas.

Pérez played all 30 games as Valencia won the league in 1970–71, under manager Alfredo Di Stéfano. He formed a defence known as the muralla blanca (White Wall) with Antón Martínez, Juan Sol and Tatono, keeping a clean sheet in 17 games. He scored twice, both being the only goal of the game in the fixtures against Sporting Gijón.

Pérez was one of several Paraguayans to come to Spain in the late 1960s, some using false claims of Spanish descent to bypass limits on foreign players. He was permitted to stay in the country as he had proven that his father was born in Logroño, and that he had family there and in San Sebastián. In September 1971 he suffered a muscle tear during Valencia's European Cup game away to HNK Hajduk Split in Yugoslavia, and did not return for five months.

=== Later career ===
In July 1975, Antón Martínez signed for Real Valladolid in the Segunda División, with Pérez due to join him, but his transfer was delayed by a flight from Paraguay; both had been teammates of the club's manager Héctor Núñez. The two-year contract was signed before the end of the month. He scored once in his only season, concluding a 2–0 home win over fellow Castile and León side Burgos CF on 14 March.

In August 1976, seeing that he did not fit into the plans of new manager Luis Aloy, Pérez terminated his contract at Valladolid and waived the 1 million peseta salary he was due for his second season, before returning to his country. He rejoined Cerro Porteño, winning the league in 1977. In 1978, he played for Deportivo Pereira in Colombia.
