= Carlos Pellicer (footballer) =

Spanish footballer (born 1944)

Personal information
- Full name: Carlos Pellicer Vázquez
- Date of birth: 12 May 1944 (age 82)
- Place of birth: A Coruña, Spain
- Height: 1.78 m (5 ft 10 in)
- Position: Forward

Senior career*
Years	Team	Apps	(Gls)
1963–1964	Fabril	24	(12)
1964–1967	Deportivo	26	(7)
1967–1970	Barcelona	21	(2)
1970–1973	Valencia	32	(6)
1973–1974	Levante	5	(0)
Total		108	(27)
- * Club domestic league appearances and goals

Carlos Pellicer Vázquez (born 12 May 1944) is a Spanish former professional footballer who played as a forward.

He played 79 games and scored 15 goals in La Liga for Deportivo, Barcelona and Valencia, winning the Copa del Generalísimo for Barcelona in 1967–68 and the league title with Valencia in 1970–71. After an Achilles tendon rupture, he retired in 1974 and qualified as a doctor, going on to practice medicine for 33 years.

== Club career ==
=== Deportivo ===
Born in A Coruña, Pellicer began his career with hometown club Deportivo. He made his senior debut in 1963–64 with the reserve team in Tercera División, Fabril; the club made the promotion playoffs but lost to Torrelavega. He made his La Liga debut on 4 October 1964 in a 1–0 loss away to Atlético Madrid, and ended his first season with 10 games and one goal as his team were relegated.

Pellicer missed the entire 1965–66 season in the Segunda División, as he was training with his father to be an electrical engineer. He returned to Depor for the 1966–67 La Liga season and recorded six goals from 16 games in another season that ended with relegation. On 14 May 1967, he scored a hat-trick in a 3–2 home win over Real Madrid in the last 16 of the Copa del Generalísimo. Fans considered Pellicer to be a natural successor to Luis Suárez, but he played down the comparison, saying that Suárez and Amancio were on a different level to anyone else.

=== Barcelona ===
In 1967, Pellicer signed for Barcelona. In his first season there, he played seven games over all competitions, while his club won the 1967–68 Copa del Generalísimo against Real Madrid. In his second season, he won favour with manager Salvador Artigas and ended the campaign with 18 appearances and three goals between the league and the UEFA Cup Winners' Cup, though in an unfamiliar right-wing position. On 21 May he played in the 1969 European Cup Winners' Cup final, a 3–2 loss to Slovan Bratislava in Basel, Switzerland. On 14 September that year, the season opened with an El Clásico match against Real Madrid and Pellicer became the first Barcelona player to come on as a substitute, replacing the injured Miguel Ángel Bustillo. In the new year, Vic Buckingham became manager at the Camp Nou and did not require Pellicer, who was released at the end of the season.

=== Valencia ===
Pellicer moved to Valencia in 1970, where he could play as a centre forward again after the departures of Vicente Guillot and Waldo Machado. His team, managed by Alfredo Di Stéfano, won the league in his first season; he contributed 22 games and three goals, but they were essential in a team based on defence that scored few goals.

After an Achilles tendon rupture in a friendly match, Pellicer missed the entire 1971–72 season, and struggled in the following campaign. He played for Levante in the second division in 1973–74 before retiring.

== International career ==
Pellicer played two games for the Spain national under-23 football team in 1967. He debuted in a 1–0 loss to France on 22 March in Barcelona, and his other game was as a substitute in a 1–1 draw away to Luxembourg eight months later.

== Post-playing career ==
Pellicer had an interest in medicine, having read medical journals since his teenage years. After retiring from football, he spent 33 years as a doctor at the Juan Canalejo Hospital in his hometown.
