= Miguel Ángel Adorno =

Argentinian–Spanish footballer (born 1949)

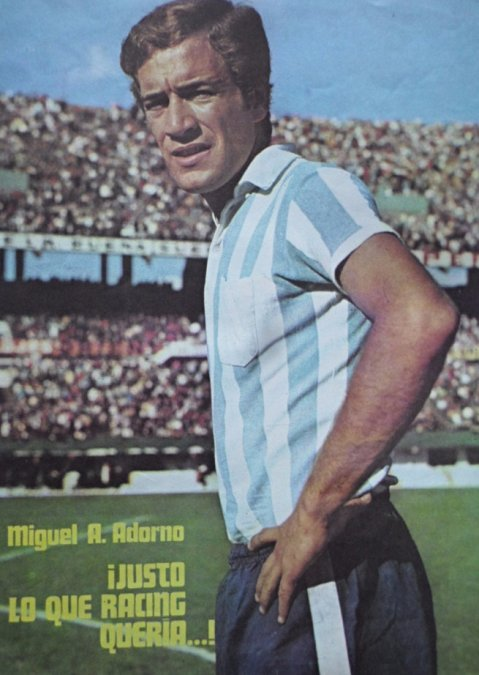
- Adorno in 1969

Personal information
- Full name: Miguel Ángel Adorno Ramírez
- Date of birth: 17 April 1949 (age 77)
- Place of birth: Puerto Aragón, Santa Fe, Argentina
- Height: 1.78 m (5 ft 10 in)
- Position: Forward

Senior career*
Years	Team	Apps	(Gls)
1969–1971	Racing Club	65	(0)
1971–1977	→ Valencia	21	(8)
1975–1976	→ Deportivo Alavés (loan)	96	(7)
1977–1978	Levante	62	(8)
- * Club domestic league appearances and goals

Miguel Ángel Adorno Ramírez (born 5 July 1949) is a retired Argentinian footballer. He spent most of his career abroad in Spain where he was known for his career with Racing Club and Valencia.

== Career ==
He began his career during the 1968 Argentine Primera División for Racing Club, reaching third place in his debut season of the Campeonato Nacional. He would remain with the club until the summer of 1971 when he would catch the interest of Valencia who were recrent champions of the 1970–71 La Liga with Alfredo Di Stéfano as club manager.

Upon his arrival to the Iberian peninsula, he would follow Spanish naming customs as he would go by the name of Adorno throughout his career in Spain. Finding himself within the starting XI of the club during the first two seasons with the club as well as gaining Spanish citizenship, he would play in 39 maatches and scored seven goals. However, he would come under difficulties during the 1973–74 season where he would be considered a foreign player upon the discovery of falsifying documents and due to the policy of only allowing two foreign players in a single season, they would opt for Salif Keïta Traoré and Kurt Jara for the next few seasons.

In the summer of 1975, alongside goalkeeper Carlos Santiago Pereira, would be loaned out to Deportivo Alavés, where he would play in the initial few matches until being injured which resulted in him leaving the club by the end of the season. He would return to Valencia under new manager Heriberto Herrera where he would play more consistently until the arrival of new manager Manuel Mestre which would leave Adorno as a substitute. He would leave Valencia following the 1976–77 season to play for Levante, once more in the Segunda División as the club would be unable to be promoted and Adorno retiring soon after.

== Later life ==
He would serve as a manager for various clubs including a stint with CF Cracks. He would also participate in club reunions with other club members of his generaiton.
