= Francisco Vidagany =

Spanish footballer (born 1940)

Personal information
- Full name: Francisco Vidagany Hernández
- Date of birth: 19 October 1940 (age 86)
- Place of birth: Valencia, Spain
- Height: 1.71 m (5 ft 7 in)
- Position: Left back

Senior career*
Years	Team	Apps	(Gls)
1961–1964	Mestalla	42	(1)
1964–1974	Valencia	181	(1)
1974–1975	Castellón	6	(0)
Total		229	(2)

International career
1969	Spain	4	(0)
- * Club domestic league appearances and goals

Francisco Vidagany Hernández (born 19 October 1940) is a Spanish former footballer who played as a left back.

He spent most of his career with his hometown club Valencia in La Liga, playing 245 matches across all competitions. He won the league title in 1970–71. Vidagany played four games for Spain, all in 1969.

== Club career ==
Born in Valencia, Vidagany began his career at local Valencia CF, playing first for the reserve team Mestalla in the Segunda División. He made his first-team debut in La Liga on 16 February 1964 in a 1–0 home win over Elche. On 24 June he played the final of the Inter-Cities Fairs Cup, which his team lost 2–1 to compatriots Real Zaragoza at the Camp Nou.

Vidagany's only two goals for the Che team came in 1964–65. On 8 October he scored in a 3–1 loss away to Belgium's RFC Liège in the first round of the Inter-Cities Fairs Cup, a minute either side of goals by opponent Henri Depireux. On 27 December he scored his only top-flight goal, the game's only at home to Deportivo de La Coruña.

On 2 February 1966, in the last 16 of the Fairs Cup away to Leeds United, Vidagany was involved in a fight with opponent Jack Charlton which resulted in both defenders being sent off.

Vidagany was part of the Valencia squad that won the league title in 1970–71 under manager Alfredo Di Stéfano. He then played in the Copa del Generalísimo final, which his club lost 4–3 to Barcelona after extra time.

In August 1974, Vidagany transferred to second-tier Castellón also in the Valencian Community, where he played the final season before his retirement.

== International career ==
Vidagany earned four caps for Spain, all in 1969. His debut on 26 March was a 1–0 friendly win over Switzerland at his home ground of the Mestalla Stadium.
