= José Manuel Pesudo =

Spanish footballer and coach

Personal information
- Full name: José Manuel Pesudo Soler
- Date of birth: 11 June 1936
- Place of birth: Almassora, Spain
- Date of death: 5 December 2003 (aged 67)
- Place of death: Valencia, Spain
- Height: 1.81 m (5 ft 11 1/2 in)
- Position: Goalkeeper

Youth career
- Dominicos
- Almazora

Senior career*
Years	Team	Apps	(Gls)
1955–1958	Valencia B	19	(0)
1957–1958	→ Alicante (loan)	17	(0)
1958–1961	Valencia	63	(0)
1961–1966	Barcelona	65	(0)
1966–1971	Valencia	64	(0)
1971–1973	Betis	24	(0)
1973–1974	Gimnàstic	12	(0)
Total		264	(0)

International career
1960–1961	Spain B	3	(0)

Managerial career
- 1976–1977: Saguntino
- 1977–1979: Vall de Uxó
- 1979–1980: Gandía
- 1981–1982: Vall de Uxó
- 1984–1985: Onda
- 1985–1986: Villarreal
- 1986–1987: Catarroja
- 1988–1990: Vall de Uxó
- 1991: Onda
- * Club domestic league appearances and goals

José Manuel Pesudo Soler (11 June 1936 – 5 December 2003) was a Spanish football goalkeeper and coach.

His 17-year professional career, in which he appeared in 216 La Liga matches, was mainly associated with Valencia and Barcelona.

== Club career ==
Born in Almassora, Province of Castellón, Pesudo arrived at Valencia CF in 1955 at the age of 19, going on to play with the reserves and neighbouring club Alicante CF before returning. After collecting 53 of his 63 La Liga appearances in his last two seasons, he signed for FC Barcelona, going on to win two titles with the Catalans, one individual (the 1965–66 edition of the Ricardo Zamora Trophy).

For most of his five-year spell, Pesudo battled for first-choice status at Barcelona with youth graduate Salvador Sadurní, but eventually had to leave in 1966, returning to Valencia and helping the Che to the Copa del Rey in his first year. He was also part of the squad that won the league in 1971, but did not appear in any games whatsoever during the campaign.

After two more years in the top flight, with Real Betis, suffering relegation in his second, Pesudo closed out his career at 38 after one season with Gimnàstic de Tarragona, in Segunda División. From 1976 to 1991 he worked as a manager, exclusively in his native region and in amateur football (he was in charge of Villarreal CF for one season in the 80s, with the club in Tercera División).

== Death ==
On 5 December 2003, Pesudo died in Valencia due to a heart attack. He was 67 years old.

== Honours ==
=== Club ===
Barcelona

- Copa del Generalísimo: 1962–63
- Inter-Cities Fairs Cup: 1965–66

Valencia

- Copa del Generalísimo: 1966–67

=== Individual ===
- Zamora Trophy: 1965–66
