= Enrique Claramunt =

Spanish retired footballer

Personal information
- Full name: Enrique Claramunt Torres
- Date of birth: 12 July 1948 (age 78)
- Place of birth: Puçol, Spain
- Height: 1.71 m (5 ft 7 in)
- Position: Forward

Youth career
- Atlético Saguntino
- Torrente

Senior career*
Years	Team	Apps	(Gls)
1968–1970	Mestalla	18	(1)
1970–1974	Valencia	54	(7)
1974–1976	Castellón	43	(5)
1976–?	Villarreal		
Total		115	(13)
- * Club domestic league appearances and goals

Enrique Claramunt Torres (born 12 July 1948) is a Spanish former footballer who played as a forward.

== Club career ==
Born in Puçol, Valencian Community, Claramunt emerged through local club Valencia CF's youth system. He made his senior debut with the reserves in the 1968–69 season, being relegated from Segunda División.

Claramunt was promoted to the Mestalla Stadium's main squad for 1970–71, his first appearance in La Liga occurring on 12 September 1970 in a 0–2 away loss against Real Madrid. He scored his first goal in the competition on 13 December in a 2–1 home win over CE Sabadell FC, and added a further four during the campaign to help his team win the fourth national championship in their history.

After leaving the Che in 1974, Claramunt continued to compete in his native region until his retirement, representing CD Castellón in the second tier and amateurs Villarreal CF.

== Personal life ==
Claramunt's older brother, José, was also a footballer. He too represented Valencia and they shared teams during four seasons, being thus known as Claramunt I and Claramunt II.

== Honours ==
Valencia

- La Liga: 1970–71
