= Lico (footballer, born 1944) =

Spanish association football player

Personal information
- Full name: José Antonio Morante Gutiérrez
- Date of birth: 7 June 1944 (age 82)
- Place of birth: Rafal, Spain
- Height: 1.70 m (5 ft 7 in)
- Position: Midfielder

Senior career*
Years	Team	Apps	(Gls)
1962–1965	Elche B		
1965–1968	Elche	72	(4)
1968–1971	Español	89	(3)
1971–1975	Valencia	97	(2)
1975–1977	Albacete		
1977–1978	Crevillente Deportivo		
1978–1979	Alicante		
1979–1982	Elche B		
1982–1983	Elche	2	(0)
Total		260+	(9+)

International career
1972	Spain	1	(0)

Managerial career
- 1989: Elche (caretaker)
- 1990: Elche
- 1992–1993: Elche
- 2003: Elche (caretaker)
- 2004: Elche
- * Club domestic league appearances and goals

José Antonio Morante Gutiérrez (born 6 July 1944), known as Lico, is a Spanish former football player and manager.

He achieved La Liga totals of 223 games and 7 goals as a midfielder for Elche, Español and Valencia. He played one game for Spain in 1972.

Lico had several brief spells as manager of Elche in each of the top three divisions of the Spanish football league system, spanning 15 years.

== Playing career ==
Born in Rafal in the Province of Alicante, Lico played in the youth ranks of nearby Elche. When he was considering emigrating to work in Germany, he was promoted to the first team by manager Otto Bumbel, who gave him his professional debut in La Liga on 19 December 1965 in a 2–0 home win over Pontevedra.

In July 1968, Lico transferred to Español for a fee of 11 million Spanish pesetas and played three seasons at the Barcelona-based club, the last of which in the Segunda División. He then moved to league champions Valencia, managed by Alfredo Di Stéfano, for 5 million, in a deal that saw Manuel Polinario transfer in the other direction. Lico played in the 1972 Copa del Generalísimo final, which his team lost 2–1 to Atlético Madrid on 8 July.

After leaving the Mestalla Stadium, Lico played in the lower leagues for Albacete, Crevillente Deportivo, Alicante and a brief return to second-tier Elche before retiring.

Lico was a Spanish international at under-21, under-23, amateur and military level. He earned his only cap for the senior team on 12 January 1972 in a 1–0 friendly win over Hungary in the Santiago Bernabeu Stadium.

== Managerial career ==
Lico was assistant manager to László Kubala – who had given him his international debut – at Elche. At the end of March 1989, the Hungarian left the Franjiverdes by mutual consent, and Lico was put in temporary charge alongside reserve team manager Juan Carlos Lezcano. On 2 April, Lico lost on his debut 3–1 away to Atlético Madrid, and Lezcano took over once his paperwork was complete, for the rest of the season that ended in relegation.

In April 1990, Lico was hired as Elche's third manager of the second-tier campaign, after the sacking of Evaristo Carrió. The team were one point above the relegation zone with seven games to play. He kept the team in the league, but was fired at the end of November and replaced by Argentine Gustavo Silva.

On 21 December 2003, Lico oversaw Elche's 2–1 loss at Alavés between the tenures of Carlos García Cantarero and Oscar Ruggeri. The Argentine was sacked in May with the club in a relegation fight, and Lico took over for the last five games. He kept the side in the division, managing to ensure that the last game was a dead rubber.
