= José Vicente Forment =

Spanish footballer (born 1947)

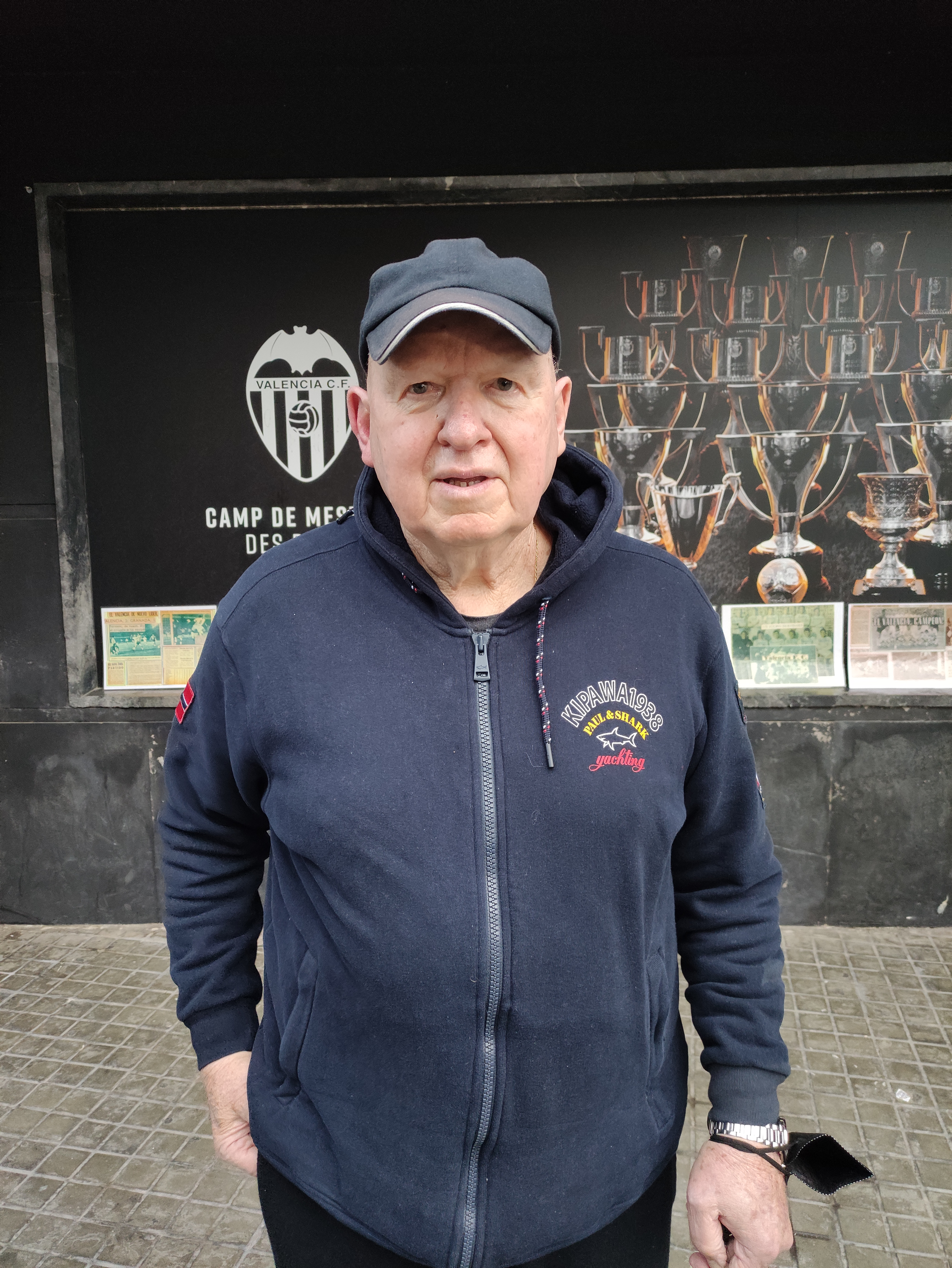
- Forment in 2022

Personal information
- Full name: José Vicente Forment Faet
- Date of birth: 31 May 1947 (age 79)
- Place of birth: Almenara, Spain
- Height: 1.77 m (5 ft 10 in)
- Position: Forward

Senior career*
Years	Team	Apps	(Gls)
1966–1970	Mestalla	46	(8)
1969–1970	→ Castellón (loan)	31	(11)
1970–1974	Valencia	57	(16)
1974–1979	Villarreal		
1979–1980	Vall de Uxó	24	(3)
Total		158+	(38+)
- * Club domestic league appearances and goals

José Vicente Forment Faet (born 31 May 1947) is a Spanish former footballer who played as a forward.

He played 75 total games and scored 23 goals for Valencia, and was their top scorer with 8 goals as they won La Liga in 1970–71. He scored a crucial goal in March 1971 against Celta Vigo, widely remembered as one of the most important in the club's history. His professional career was ended by a tibia and fibula break in September 1972.

== Career ==
Born in Almenara in the Province of Castellón, Forment came through the youth ranks of Valencia and made his professional debut with the reserve team in the Segunda División in 1965. Following their relegation, he was loaned to Castellón in the same league for 1969–70, scoring 11 goals.

Forment made his first-team debut for Valencia on 29 September 1970 among several fringe players in a 3–1 home win over Cork Hibernians of Ireland in the second round of the first leg of the Inter-Cities Fairs Cup. This was followed five days later by his La Liga bow, playing the final 38 minutes of a 2–2 draw at Granada as a substitute for José Claramunt. On 25 October he scored his first top-flight goal, the only one against Málaga at Mestalla Stadium.

Forment was Valencia's top scorer with eight goals as they won the league for the first time in 24 years in 1970–71. On 4 January, he scored the only goal at home to Real Madrid to put his team top. His goal on 28 March was remembered as a turning point in the season; in added time, he finished a corner kick from Sergio Manzanera for a 2–1 win over Celta Vigo with three games left to play.

After the league had finished, Forment scored three goals in six games as Valencia finished runners-up to Barcelona in the Copa del Generalísimo. He scored home and away in the quarter-finals against Málaga. On 4 July in the final, he and Claramunt came on as 78th-minute substitutes in a 4–3 extra-time loss.

In August 1971, Forment scored in his first two European Cup games as Valencia won 4–1 on aggregate in the first round against Union Luxembourg. Thirteen months later, he suffered a tibia and fibula break from Granada defender Ramón Aguirre Suárez, from which his career did not recover.

After leaving professional football in 1974, Forment played for Villarreal in his home province. He received an offer from Sporting de Gijón, but turned it down, believing that they wanted the player he was before the injury. His final season was with Vall de Uxó in the Segunda División B in 1979–80.
