= Pedro María Zabalza =

Spanish footballer and manager

Personal information
- Full name: Pedro María Zabalza Inda
- Date of birth: 13 April 1944 (age 82)
- Place of birth: Pamplona, Spain
- Height: 1.78 m (5 ft 10 in)
- Position: Midfielder

Youth career
- Gure Txokoa

Senior career*
Years	Team	Apps	(Gls)
1963–1964	Oberena		
1964–1967	Osasuna	64	(17)
1967–1973	Barcelona	149	(10)
1973–1976	Athletic Bilbao	57	(2)
1976–1977	Osasuna		
Total		270	(29)

International career
1968–1969	Spain	7	(0)

Managerial career
- 1986–1993: Osasuna
- 1995: Rayo Vallecano
- 1996–1997: Osasuna
- * Club domestic league appearances and goals

Pedro María Zabalza Inda (born 13 April 1944) is a Spanish former professional football midfielder and manager.

His career was mostly associated with Osasuna, especially as a coach. As a player, he amassed La Liga totals of 206 matches and 12 goals over nine seasons, with Barcelona and Athletic Bilbao.

== Club career ==
Born in Pamplona, Navarre, Zabalza started out at his local club CA Osasuna, where he spent three Segunda División seasons and scored a career-best ten goals in 1965–66 to help to a ninth place. In the summer of 1967 he moved to La Liga, signing for FC Barcelona and making his debut in the competition on 10 September in a 3–2 away loss to Real Zaragoza.

Zabalza played 194 competitive games and scored 15 times during his six-year spell at the Camp Nou, helping to win two Copa del Generalísimo trophies and scoring twice in the 1971 final against Valencia CF. After a further three top-flight campaigns with Athletic Bilbao, he closed out his career at the age of 33 with Osasuna, now competing in the Tercera División.

After taking over from Ivica Brzić 11 rounds into 1986–87, Zabalza went on to coach his last club a full six seasons in the top tier. He resigned in December 1993 as they rank third-bottom in the table, eventually being relegated as last.

Zabalza began 1995–96 at the helm of Rayo Vallecano, but after seven matches and six losses he was dismissed. In the following campaign he was one of four managers in charge of Osasuna (the others being Rafael Benítez, Miguel Sola and Enrique Martín), who was the first team above the division two relegation zone.

== International career ==
Zabalza earned seven caps for Spain in eight months. His first occurred on 17 October 1968, in a 3–1 friendly win in France.

== Honours ==
Barcelona

- Copa del Generalísimo: 1967–68, 1970–71
