= Salvador Llopis =

Spanish footballer

Personal information
- Full name: Salvador Llopis Soler
- Date of birth: 2 July 1950
- Place of birth: Oliva, Valencian Community, Spain
- Date of death: 9 January 2014 (aged 63)
- Place of death: Oliva, Valencian Community, Spain
- Height: 1.75 m (5 ft 9 in)
- Position: Goalkeeper

Salvador Llopis Soler (2 July 1950 – 9 January 2014), better known as simply Cota, was a Spanish footballer who primarily played as a goalkeeper.

Salvador Llopis died on 9 January 2014, aged 63, in his hometown of Oliva, Valencian Community.
