= José Ramón Fuertes =

Spanish footballer

Personal information
- Full name: José Ramón Fuertes Roces
- Date of birth: 2 September 1943 (age 83)
- Place of birth: Mieres, Spain
- Height: 1.69 m (5 ft 7 in)
- Position: Forward

Senior career*
Years	Team	Apps	(Gls)
1963–1965	Real Valladolid	40	(6)
1965–1969	Pontevedra	88	(9)
1969–1973	Valencia	44	(3)
1973–1974	Burgos	19	(1)
Total		191	(19)

Managerial career
- 1976–1979: Caudal
- 1979–1980: Langreo
- 1980–1982: Logroñés
- 1982–1984: Tenerife
- 1984–1986: Avilés Industrial
- 1987: Alcoyano
- 1987–1988: Alzira
- 1988–1989: Recreativo de Huelva
- 1989: Real Murcia
- 1991–1992: Recreativo de Huelva
- 1993: Numancia
- 1993–1994: Mensajero
- * Club domestic league appearances and goals

José Ramón Fuertes Roces (born 22 September 1943) is a Spanish former football player and manager.

A forward, he achieved La Liga totals of 155 games and 14 goals for Real Valladolid, Pontevedra and Valencia, winning the title with the last of those clubs in 1970–71.

As a manager, Fuertes worked mainly in the lower leagues, apart from a brief La Liga spell with Real Murcia and three clubs in the Segunda División.

== Managerial career ==
Fuertes won promotion for Caudal from the Tercera División to the Segunda División B and also managed Logroñés before arriving at Tenerife. With the club from the Canary Islands, he won promotion to the Segunda División in 1982–83. He was fired due to poor results in February 1984.

In 1987–88, Fuertes won Alzira's first promotion to the second tier. He began the following season at Recreativo de Huelva in the same competition, leaving in April 1989 for top-flight Real Murcia.

Fuertes's debut as a La Liga manager on 31 April 1989 was a 2–1 defeat at his former club Real Valladolid, and he said after the game that the opponents must have visited Sanctuary of Fátima weekly to account for their luck. He won once in nine games as the season ended in relegation, though that came in a 2–0 home victory over Barcelona on 25 May, a result that contributed to Real Madrid winning the title over Johan Cruyff's team. He left the Estadio de La Condomina by mutual consent in October 1989, after a poor start to the new season. He waivered 2 million Spanish pesetas from his contract, thereby being paid out with 8 million.

Fuertes returned in 1991 to Recreativo, back in the third division, as their fourth manager of the season. His team reached the playoff but were beaten to promotion by Real Madrid Castilla.

From the mid-1990s, Fuertes changed career to a scout and technical advisor at Valencia. He signed fellow Mieres native Miguel Ángel Angulo from Sporting de Gijón youth on a free transfer, proposing a pay rise from 30,000 to 500,000 pesetas a month while the player's father was unemployed. He persuaded another Asturian, Juan Mata, to leave Real Madrid Castilla for Valencia, who sold him years later to Chelsea for €30 million.
