= Puçol =

Puçol Puzol
- Municipality
- Flag Coat of arms

- Location of Puçol in Spain Puçol (Valencian Community) Puçol (Spain)
- Coordinates: 39°37′0″N 0°18′4″W
- Country: Spain
- Autonomous community: Valencian Community
- Province: Valencia
- Comarca: Horta Nord
- Judicial district: Massamagrell

Government
  - Alcalde: José Vicente Martí (2009) (PSPV-PSOE)

Area
  - Total: 18.06 km^{2} (6.97 sq mi)
- Elevation: 25 m (82 ft)

Population (2025-01-01)
  - Total: 21,659
  - Density: 1,199/km^{2} (3,106/sq mi)
- Demonym(s): Puçolenc, Puçolenca
- Time zone: UTC+1 (CET)
  - Summer (DST): UTC+2 (CEST)
- Postal code: 46530
- Official language(s): Valencian
- Website: Official website

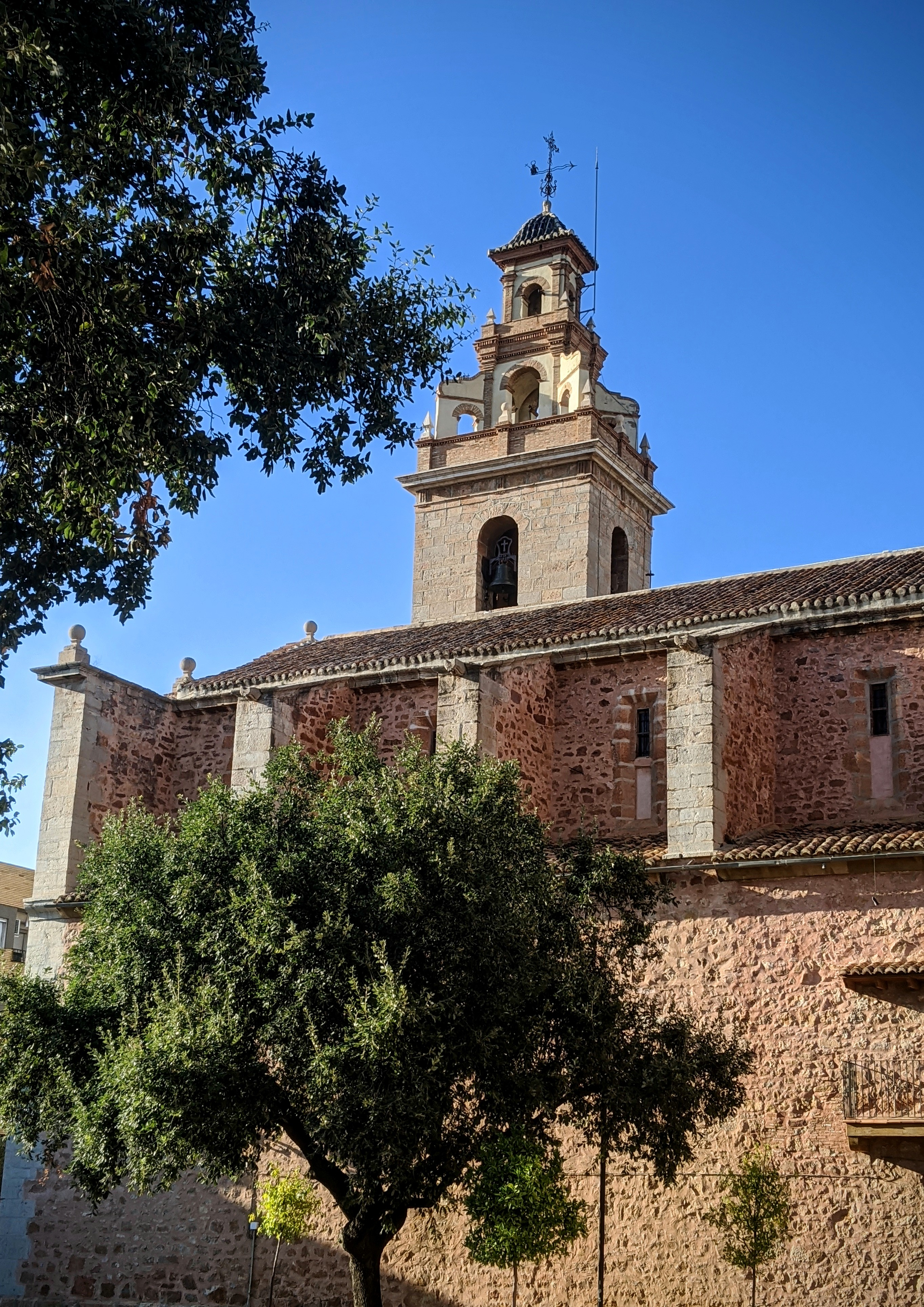
View of Santos Juanes Church in Puzol

Puçol (Valencian: [puˈsɔl]; Spanish: Puzol [puˈθol]) is a Spanish municipality located in the province of Valencia, part of the Valencian Community autonomous region. It belongs to the Horta Nord. The municipality borders El Puig south and Sagunt (or Sagunto) to the north. It has 19,975 inhabitants (01/01/2021), of whom 9,839 are men and 10,136 are women (according to INE).

== Geography ==
The town is located in the northernmost of the Horta of Valencia. It extends from a mountainous area its westerly edge (Los Monasterios, Alfinach and Monte Picayo), passing a level strip, where the town is located, down to the flat and partially marshy coastal zone on the easterly edge (Playa Puçol or Platja Puçol). The northern part of Playa Pucol is a protected marshland call La Marjal dels Moros.

=== Districts ===
- Puçol (Valencian) / Puzol (Castilian)
- Beach / Platja Puçol (Valencian) / Playa Puzol (Castilian)
- Monte Picayo
- Los Monasterios
- Alfinach

== History ==
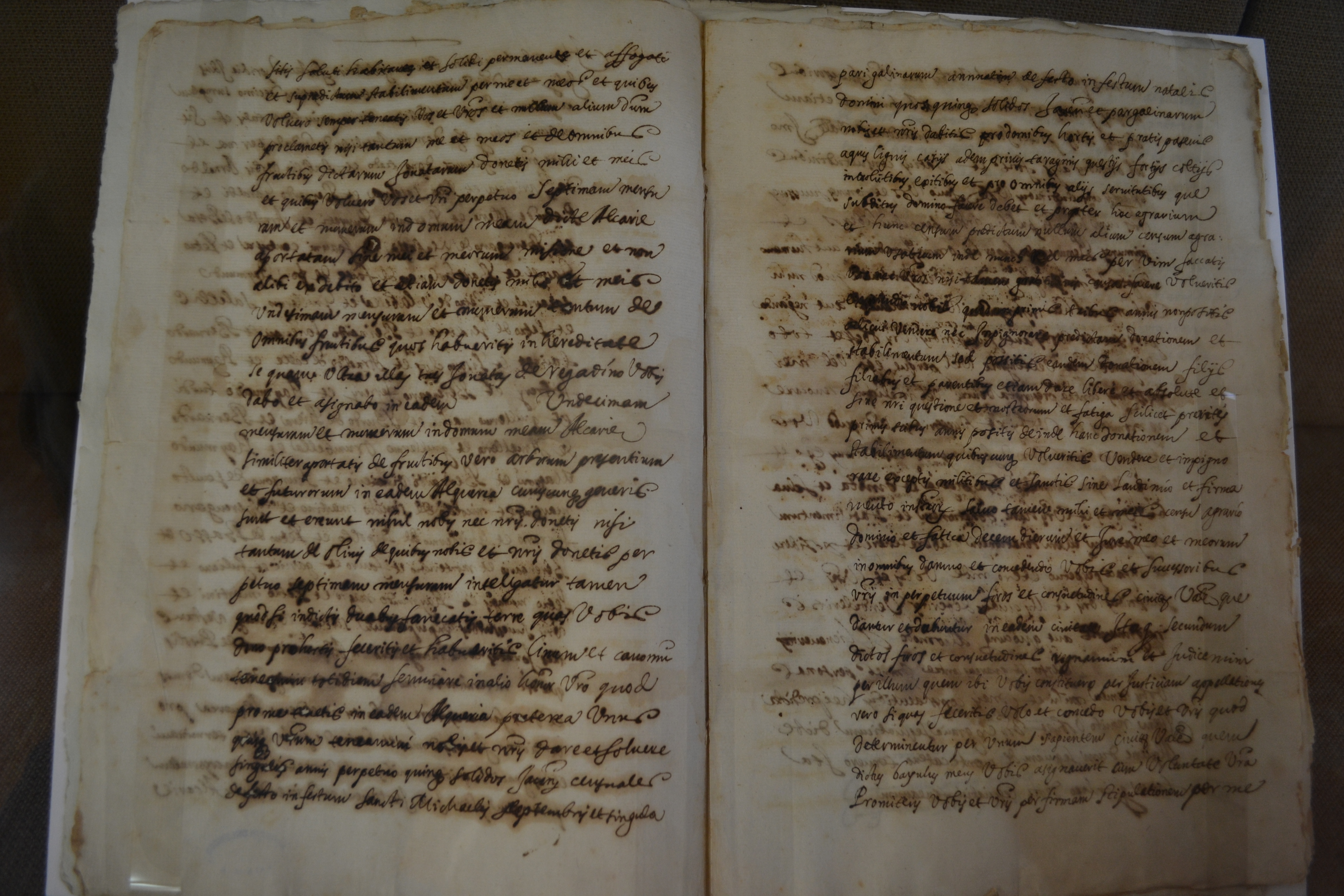
Municipal charter of Puçol (1317)

Jaume I gave rise to the Asalit Gudal, who gave the 40 Christians to populate on 29 November 1242. In May 1243, it returned to the king to sell 18,000 salary. The king, in November that year, gave the village and place Puçol, delivering a half to the bishop and Cabildo Valencia and the other at the convent of Roncesvalles which bought part of his 9000 salary to the Cabildo 1244. The 1262 population is given a letter to 27 residents. In 1288 the bishop of Valencia, Romuald Peset, Puçol allocating income to the house of charity.

The 1317 the Archbishop of Valencia awarded letter Puçol population to 39 residents and their successors, giving three jovates irrigated land, besides orchards. In return the settlers to Mr. Deven between a seventh and a tenth of the fruits collected and some chickens, however, must pay a census, and the fatigue lluisme. In the Valencian Parliament of Ferdinand II of Aragon, the ecclesiastical exemption requests for the University of Puçol tribute dinner, which was already granted James I, but from the King Martin of Aragon sold demanding.

In the Courts of Charles V in 1537 requested to pay franchise and other coronatge marriage and royal rights. In the 1522 requested that harmony is maintained Puçol gives the freedom to enter half the harvest of wine without paying Sisa. In 1604 is again asked to maintain the franchise to pay lleuda, tolls or any royal rights. In the Courts of 1626 exemption from the church asked to pay the stamp duty and repayment of two thousand pounds.

The parish church dedicated to St. John Baptiste, was built in 1607, on another old 1359. In the late eighteenth and early nineteenth century the main production Puçol relied on the vine, it produced some 42,000 wine quarry, in addition to crops such as carob, olive, wheat, silk, all kinds of fruits and vegetables. Has seven oil mills, two flour mills, five leather bread ovens.

The Battle of Sagunto took place in Puçol and neighbouring districts on 25 October 1811. This battle is also known in Spain as the Battle of Puçol. The main action took place between the town and the Sierra Calderona where the modern AP7 motorway cuts through the side of a small hill. This Napoleonic battle formed part of the Spanish War of Independence or The Peninsular War as it is often referred to in English.

== Economy ==
Its economic wealth, mainly agricultural until 1950 has been subsequently transformed by a number of industries and are expected to increase due to the proximity of the steel plant at the Port of Sagunto. Within the gardens are in rainfed almond, olive and carob trees and vineyards. The vineyard was in the centuries of its main crops. At present citrus occupy most of the land that is irrigated, which puts it in the first crop, both for extension as well as economic significance. The rest of the garden is devoted to fruit, various vegetables, tomatoes and onions, corn and potatoes in smaller proportions. There is farming wool and beef.

== Monuments ==
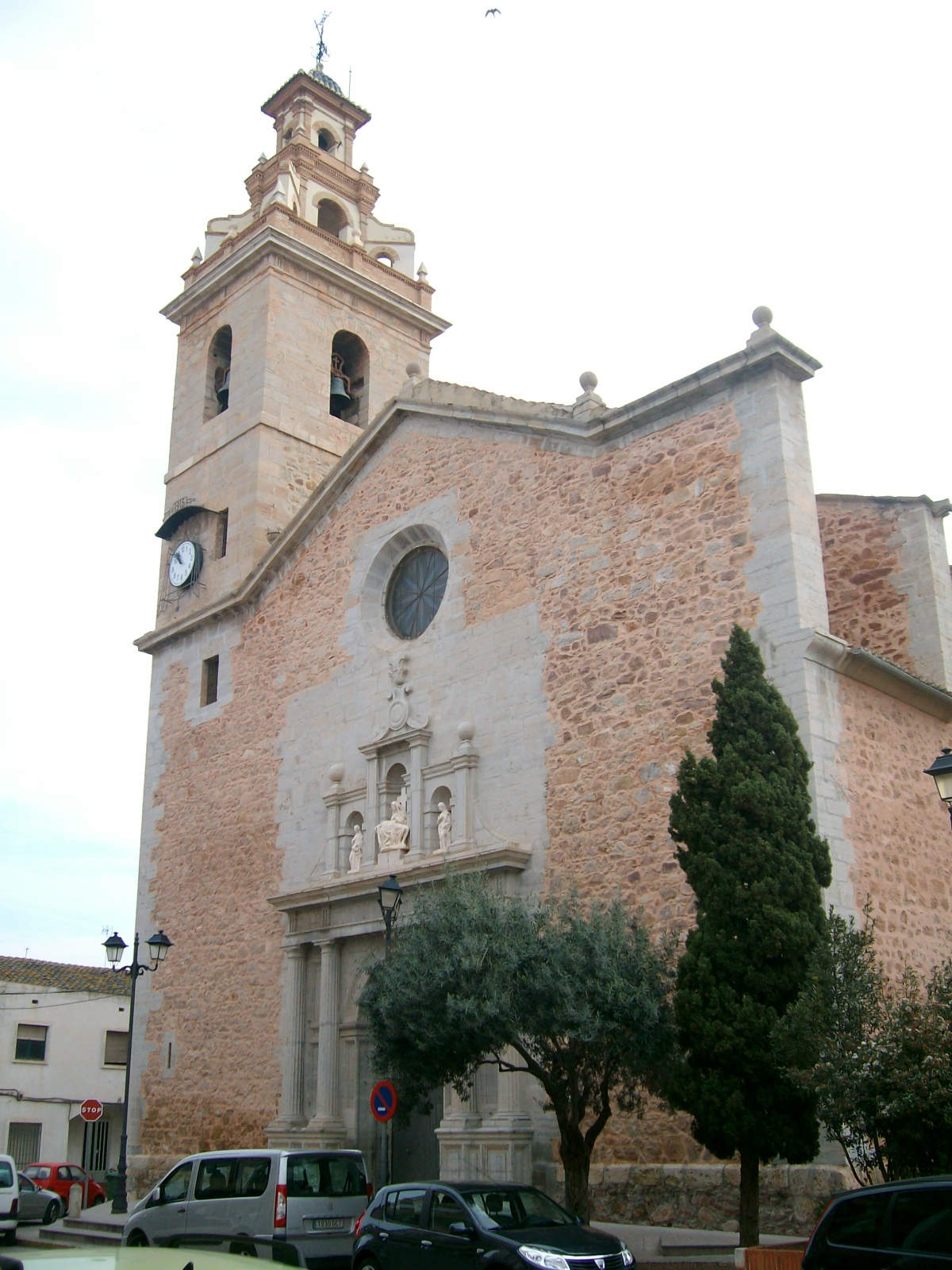
Church of Santos Juanes

- Santos Juanes Church. Built in 1607 by Juan de Ribera. This monument is a temple of ESBELT wide nave with a magnificent golden Baroque altar and side chapels. Its exterior is characterized by great elegance in the arrangement of classic eleme
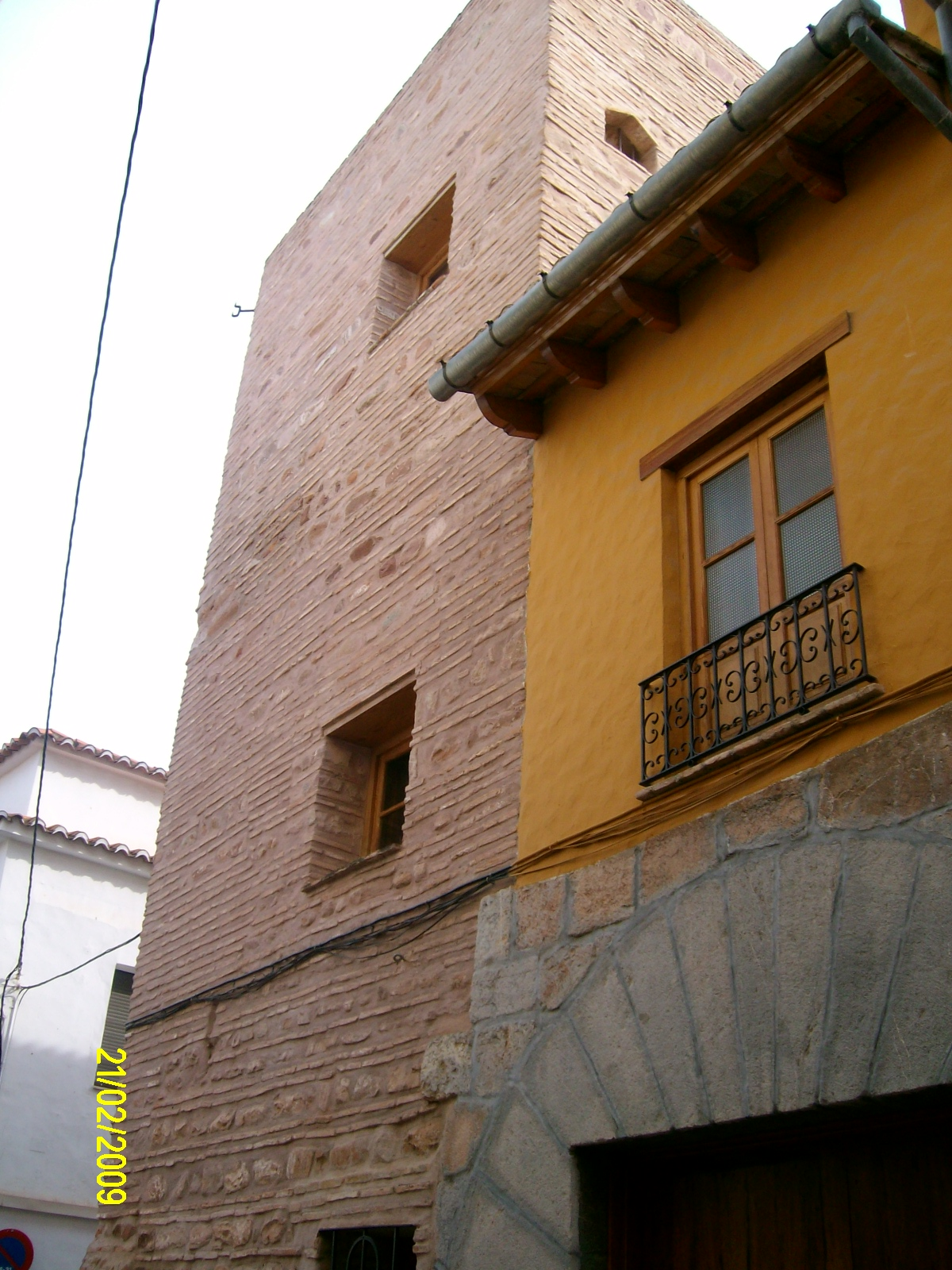
  Lookout Tower
- Santa Martas Church. Built in 1964. It is a functional church, that plays with natural light. It was built by the parishioners themselves, an aspect that makes it more attractive. Inside you can find various works such as the altarpiece that represents a quote from the Gospel; the iconography of Santa Marta, patron saint of the church; and various sculptures such as the Immaculate Conception or the Christ of Hope.
- The Lookout Tower was built around the fourteenth century in order to protect themselves against the Moro rebellions, banditry and pirates stalk the peace of the rural population. Then up the tower from where you could see the sea from the mountain slopes surrounding the town. The tower-style corn is a basic prismatic quadrangular lateral faces medint 5.50 meters wide and about 10 meters which is private membership from a century ago and is considered the home oldest town. Today the tower is restored, the exterior stone, brick and tile clay is good proof of the conglomeration of cultures that came composing. Definitivamet is a historical monument as a testimony consevar Puçol ten events and cultural symbol.

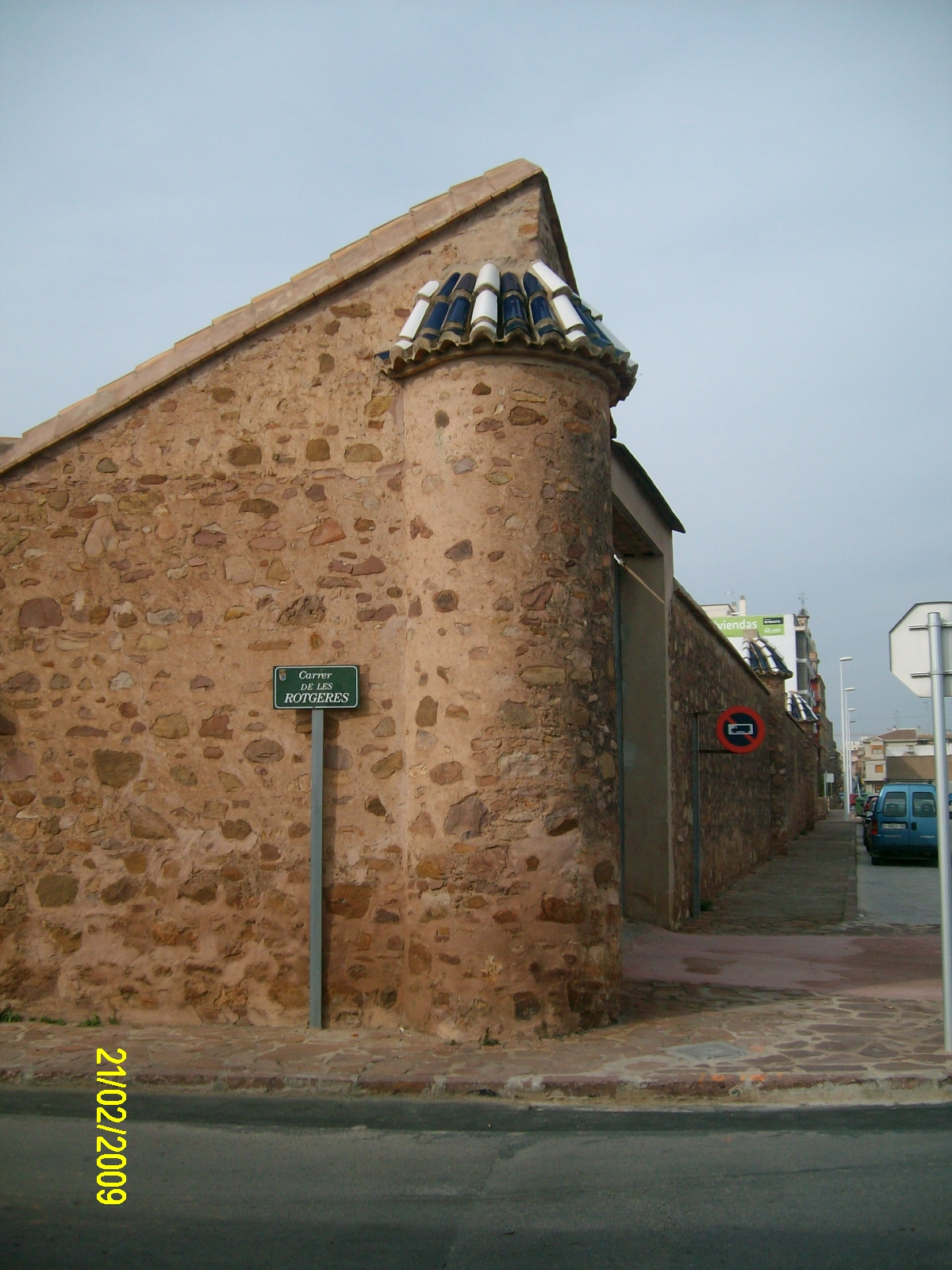
Wall Botanical Garden

- Wall of the Archbishop's Palace. Puçol was for many years lordship of the Archbishop of Valencia then in 1607 was built beside the present church, the Archbishop's Palace which even today we still have the old masonry wall with semicircular turrets topped with ceramic tiles of blue and white baroque lines showing.

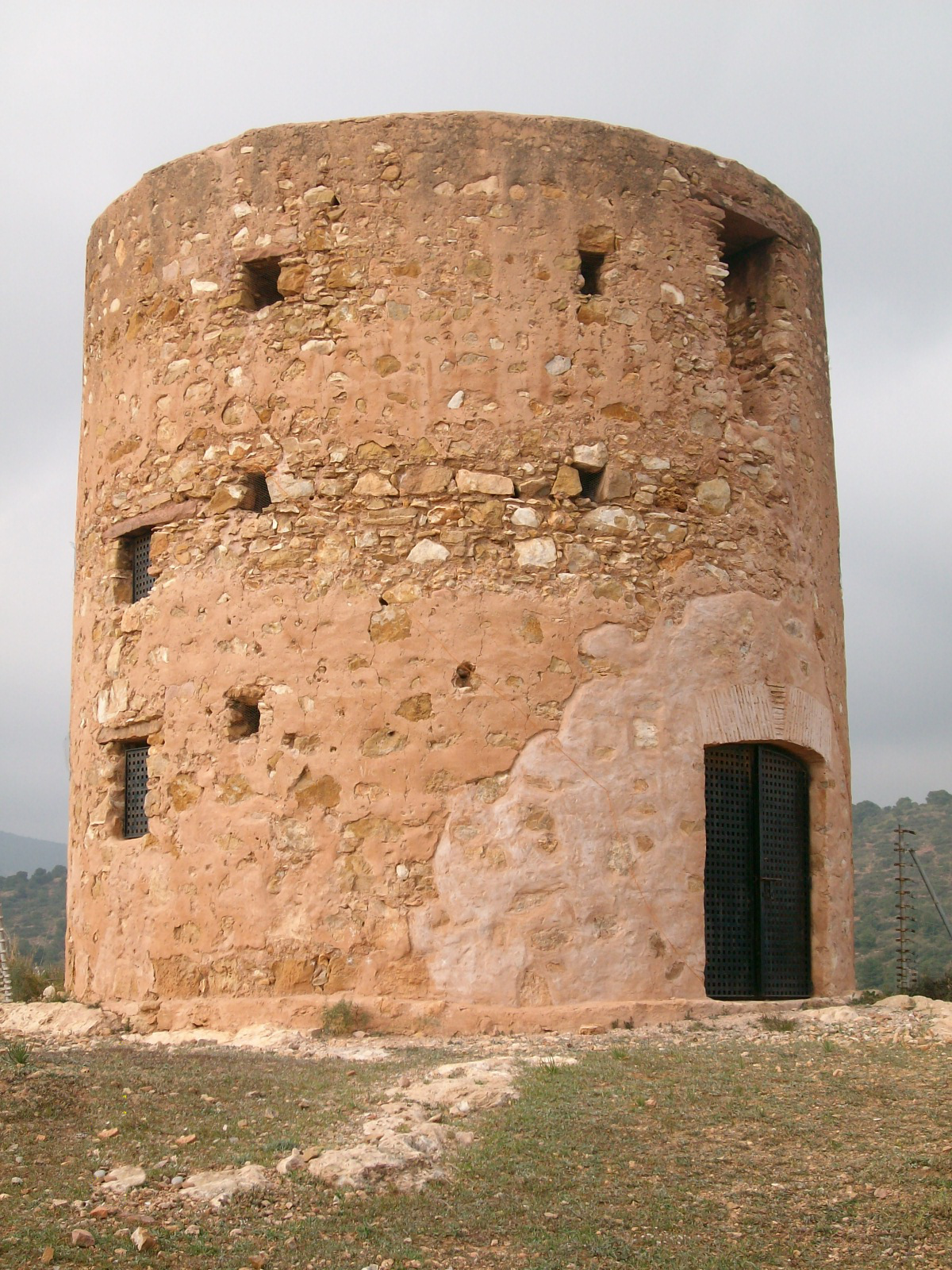
Windmill

- Windmill. In uncertain times, although some scholars date the Saracen period. The windmill stopped work in the first half of last century to be a building of historical interest because it is one of the few mills that these characteristics exist in Valencia.
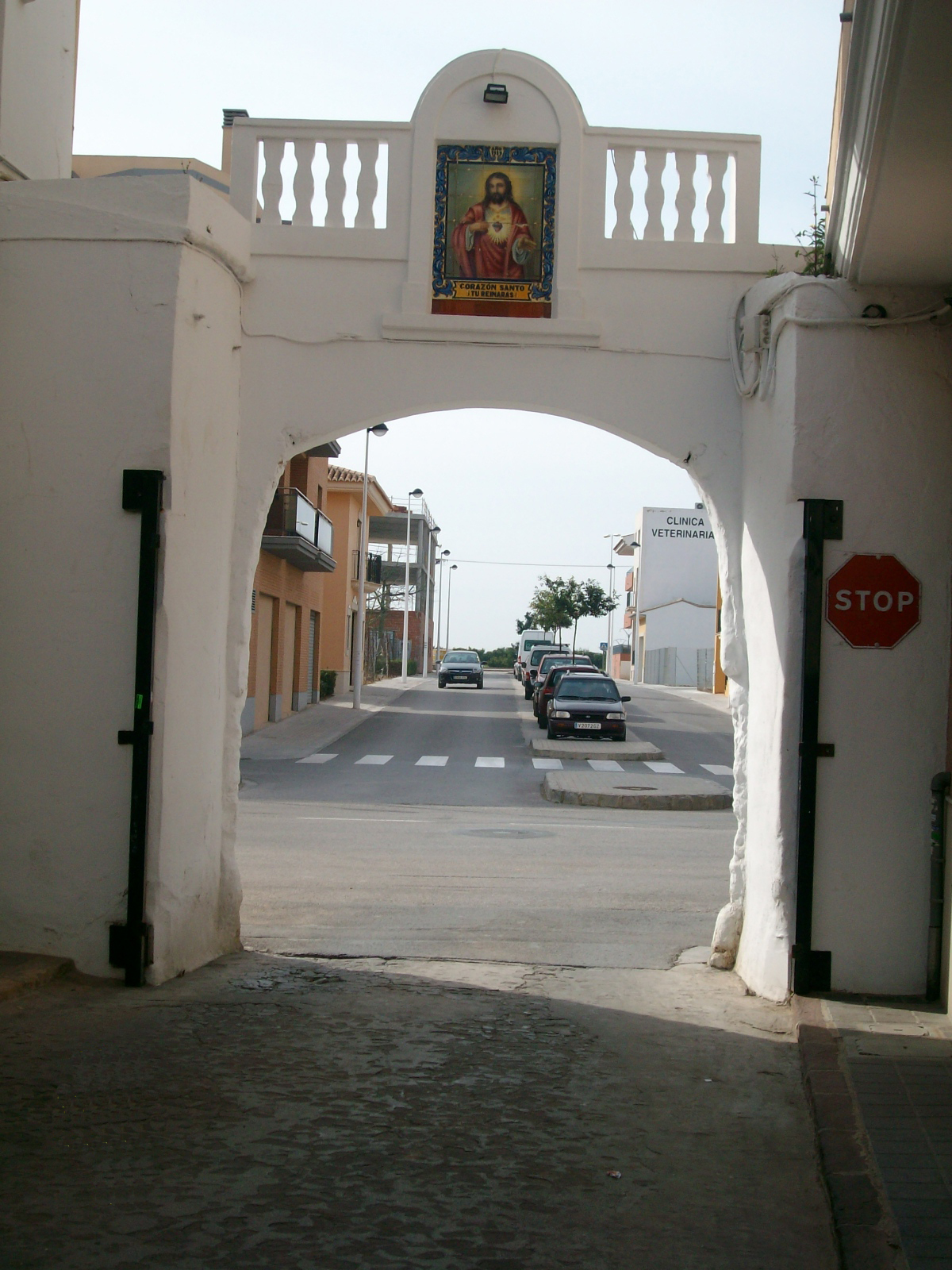
  Home Heart of Jesus
- WebsiteHeart of Jesus. Located on the street is the last surviving Knights of the various doors closed until the nineteenth century the town.

== Points of interest ==
- Municipal Finca La Costera. In the western part of town. The Farm is 517,245 square meters of municipal ownership and possesses a youth hostel with a capacity for 25 people, recreation areas and areas repopulated with pines and native vegetation. It has been stated Natural City.
- Beach. Got a blue flag after taking several years Qualitur certificate of water quality and providing services to the tourist community. Also created the office of the tourist attention Tourist info Puçol. On the beach during the summer it offers various leisure activities and services, from toy library, health care, street market, free umbrellas, lifeguards, aerobics, etc.. Today the beach has more than 1000 inhabitants, of which over 300 are first or second residence for at least part-time in 5 months of the year.
- The Pond

== Holidays and celebrations ==
- Festivals and employers. Held 1 to 9 September in honour of the Virgin at the foot of the Cross. The parties are composed of popular events and religious ceremonies. They begin the last Sunday in August at the festival Cabeçol, from here you combine musical performances, exhibitions, sporting events, religious events, and general activities for all ages.
- Saint John (San Juan). From 22 to 24 June organizes cultural events, bullfighting, holidays and focus on the elderly. The San Juan is the first bull of the year, talking about the "bull in the street".
- Falcons. From 14 to 19 March. The first committee is constituted fallera Puçol 1980. At present there are four flaws in Puçol, is the oldest and the most recent failure Hostalets Picayo failure, there are intermediate fails Windmill and Fault-Palace Tower. Organize cultural activities, plantfails, games, dances, passacarrers, awakened, offerings of flowers to the patron saint of the town, parades and the burning of the monuments to close falleros.
- Fiesta de San Antonio Abad. This festival is celebrated the weekend closest to 17 January with the traditional events of "oxen in the street" parade, "cream" of the bonfire, fire-runs, "Towers" popular boilers popular blessing of animals as well as various cultural and recreational activities.
- Fiesta de San Miguel. This is the festival of nature's longest tradicicó neighborhood in the town. Held from 25 to 29 September with traditional religious and popular events such as flares procession, Mass, the parade, dinner on the street, the chocolate and children's playgrounds, the ox of cardboard, and tracas almost the LF.

== Famous people ==
- José Claramunt "Pep Claramunt" (born 1946), former footballer for Valencia CF and the Spain national football team.

== See also ==
- UD Puçol
- List of municipalities in Valencia
