= Djalma Freitas =

Brazilian footballer

Personal information
- Full name: Djalma Nascimento Freitas
- Date of birth: 7 September 1938
- Place of birth: Recife, Brazil
- Date of death: 14 June 2012 (aged 73)
- Place of death: Recife, Brazil
- Position: Forward

Senior career*
Years	Team	Apps	(Gls)
1959–1965	Sport Recife		
1961	→ São Paulo (loan)	2	(0)
1965–1966	Vitória de Guimarães	23	(19)
1966–1969	Porto	72	(42)
1969–1971	Belenenses		
1971–1972	Oriental		
1972–1973	Marinhense		
1973–1974	Espinho		
- * Club domestic league appearances and goals as of 17 March 2025

Djalma Nascimento Freitas (7 September 1938 – 14 June 2012), better known as Djalma Freitas, was a Brazilian professional footballer who played as a forward.

== Career ==
Discovered in amateur championships in Recife, Djalma Freitas arrived at Sport in 1959. With the club, he was two-time state champion in 1960 and 1961, top scorer and to this day is the second highest scorer in the entire history of the club, with 159 total goals. In 1961 he had two months of experience at São Paulo FC, but due to his bad behavior off the field he ended up returning to Sport.

In the second half of 1965 he moved to Portugal, where he played for the next 13 years, playing for Vitória de Guimarães, Porto, Belenenses, Oriental, Marinhense and Espinho.

== Honours ==
Sport

- Campeonato Pernambucano: 1961, 1962

Porto

- Taça de Portugal: 1967–68

Individual

- Campeonato Pernambucano top scorer: 1960

== Personal life ==
Freitas stood out for his controversial behavior in his personal life. He had 12 children with at least 7 different women, had problems with alcoholism, was involved in several traffic accidents during his time in Portugal and was even sentenced to prison in Brazil for non-payment of alimony. He died in his sleep at his home in the Várzea, neighborhood of Recife, at the age of 73.
