= Jesús Martínez (footballer, born 1947) =

Spanish footballer (born 1947)

Personal information
- Full name: Jesús Martínez Rivadeneira
- Date of birth: 7 December 1947 (age 78)
- Place of birth: Cangas, Spain
- Height: 1.78 m (5 ft 10 in)
- Positions: Defender; midfielder

Senior career*
Years	Team	Apps	(Gls)
1967–1968	Racing Club		
1968–1978	Valencia	178	(2)
1978	Levante	2	(0)
1979–1980	Huracán		
1981–1983	Quilmes		
1984–1986	Banfield		
1986	Colón		
1987–1989	Almagro		
1990–1992	Defensores de Belgrano		

International career
- Spain U18
1973–1974	Spain	4	(0)
- * Club domestic league appearances and goals

Jesús Martínez Rivadeneira (born 7 December 1947) is a Spanish former footballer who played as a defender or midfielder.

He emigrated to Argentina as an infant and began and finished his career there, playing until the age of 45. He spent a decade in Spain with Valencia, playing 235 games across all competitions and winning La Liga in 1970–71. He played four international games for Spain from 1973 to 1974.

After retiring from playing, Martínez was sporting director of Valencia from 1994 to 1997. He later became an agent.

== Early life ==
Martínez was born in Cangas, a village in Foz in Galicia. His parents ran a bar in nearby Nois, and before his second birthday, they emigrated to Buenos Aires, Argentina, where they already had relatives. The family sought to escape the living conditions of post-civil war Spain.

== Club career ==
Martínez began his career in Argentina with Racing Club, before returning to his country of birth in 1968 when he signed for Valencia. He was signed to replace club icon Manuel Mestre and played his first season as a midfielder, but received criticism from fans for perceived over-elaborate play.

On 10 August 1969, Martínez was conscripted for military service and stationed in El Aiun in the Spanish Sahara. At the end of his service, he returned to Valencia and played as a sweeper, remaining a regular for eight seasons. He was nicknamed La Muralla del Valencia ("The Wall of Valencia"). He was part of the team that won La Liga in 1970–71 under the management of Alfredo Di Stéfano but was injured for most of the campaign, contributing to nine games and assisting one goal.

After a decade at Valencia, Martínez remained in the city by signing for Levante in Segunda División B in August 1978. He signed a two-year deal, worth 1.5 million Spanish pesetas each. He returned to Argentina in 1979, and played for Huracán, Quilmes, Banfield, Colón, Almagro and Defensores de Belgrano, retiring in 1992, aged 45.

== International career ==
Martínez played one match for the Spain national under-18 football team against France. In 1972, he was called up by manager László Kubala for the senior national team away to Greece, but was injured beforehand. He played four matches for the national team, starting on 21 October 1973 with a goalless draw away to Yugoslavia in an unsuccessful qualification campaign for the 1974 FIFA World Cup. As of 2016, he was the only senior international from his home comarca of Mariña de Lugo. He played in a period when Latin American players falsified their genealogy to play for the national team, but was able to prove to sceptics that he had been born in Spain and served in the military.

== Post-playing career ==
After retiring, Martínez worked for a company distributing slot machines in Argentina for two years, before being signed on a five-year contract as sporting director at Valencia. The club president who signed him was Francisco Roig Alfonso, his brother-in-law by their marriages to a pair of sisters. He was put in charge of the third-biggest budget in La Liga, and signed 1994 FIFA World Cup-winning manager Carlos Alberto Parreira and players worth 1.4 billion pesetas (around £7 million at the time), but the club struggled in the league and lost the 1995 Copa del Rey final to Deportivo.

The following season, manager Luis Aragonés was hired and challenged for the title with players such as Predrag Mijatović, but after the Yugoslav was sold, Aragonés and Roig fell out and the manager was dismissed. Martínez was accused by fans of nepotism for remaining employed by his brother-in-law. He left the club abruptly in 1997 and became an agent, specialising in bringing Latin American players to Spain. He was involved in the signings of Martín Palermo, Juan Román Riquelme and Diego Forlán for Villarreal, as well as bringing in Chilean manager Manuel Pellegrini; the club was under the ownership of another member of the Roig family, Fernando Roig.
