= Antón Martínez =

Spanish footballer (born 1944)

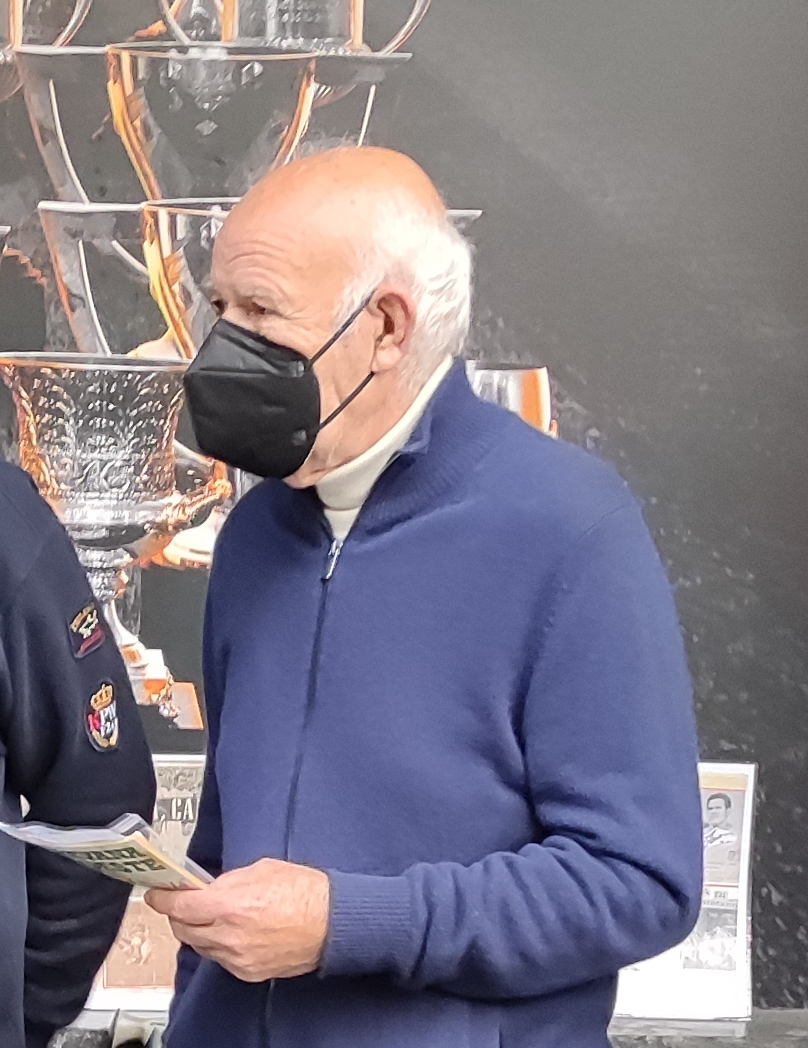
- Martínez in 2022

Personal information
- Full name: Antonio Manuel Martínez Morales
- Date of birth: 19 October 1944 (age 82)
- Place of birth: Bilbao, Spain
- Height: 1.80 m (5 ft 11 in)
- Position: Left back

Youth career
- Chinar Barbate
- Betis

Senior career*
Years	Team	Apps	(Gls)
- Betis B
1964–1969	Betis	109	(2)
1969–1975	Valencia	158	(6)
1975–1977	Valladolid	40	(2)
Total		307+	(10+)

International career
1969–1971	Spain	5	(0)
- * Club domestic league appearances and goals

Antonio Manuel Martínez Morales (born 19 October 1944) is a Spanish former footballer who played as a left back.

He made 219 La Liga appearances for Betis and Valencia, winning the title with the latter in 1971, and added 88 Segunda División games for Betis and Real Valladolid. He played five games for Spain between 1969 and 1971.

== Club career ==
Martínez was born in Bilbao in the Basque Country and raised in Barbate in Andalusia. He began playing for local club Chinar de Barbate before joining Real Betis, starting in their reserve team of Triana.

In 1964–65, Martínez played in the Betis first team in La Liga, on a 150,000 Spanish peseta contract with bonuses of 5,000 per match. In February 1969, he transferred to Valencia for 700,000 pesetas, with his salary increasing to 1.2 million for his first full season.

Martínez was a key part of the Valencia side that won the league in 1970–71; the defence of Tatono, Juan Sol, Martínez and Aníbal Pérez was known as the muralla blanca ("White Wall"). In 1976 he left for Real Valladolid of Segunda División, where he earned his highest salary of 2 million pesetas despite playing in a lower league.

== International career ==
Martínez represented Spain at amateur, under-23 and military level in the late 1960s.

On 23 April 1969, Martínez made his senior international debut in a goalless draw with Mexico at the Ramón Sánchez Pizjuán Stadium. The report in Mundo Deportivo said that he showed nervousness and performed lower than his Valencia standards.

Martínez's other four caps for his country came in 1971. His final game was a UEFA Euro 1972 qualifier against the Soviet Union on 27 October, incidentally at the same venue and same result as his debut; the result eliminated Spain from the competition.

== Style of play ==
As a defender, Martínez was physically strong and could clear the ball with his feet and head. He frequently ran with the ball into wide attacking positions to cross the ball into the opposing penalty area.

Having begun his career with tactics to simply clear the ball from his team's defence, Martínez was trained by Valencia manager Alfredo Di Stéfano to play more passes and dribble the ball down the wing. Spain manager László Kubala praised Martínez's attacking attributes, but said that he had to mark his opponents better defensively.

Martínez was known at Valencia for being fined for arriving late to training. Fines were put together to pay for end-of-season meals, and his provided 80% of the entire budget.
