= Sergio Manzanera =

Spanish footballer (born 1950)

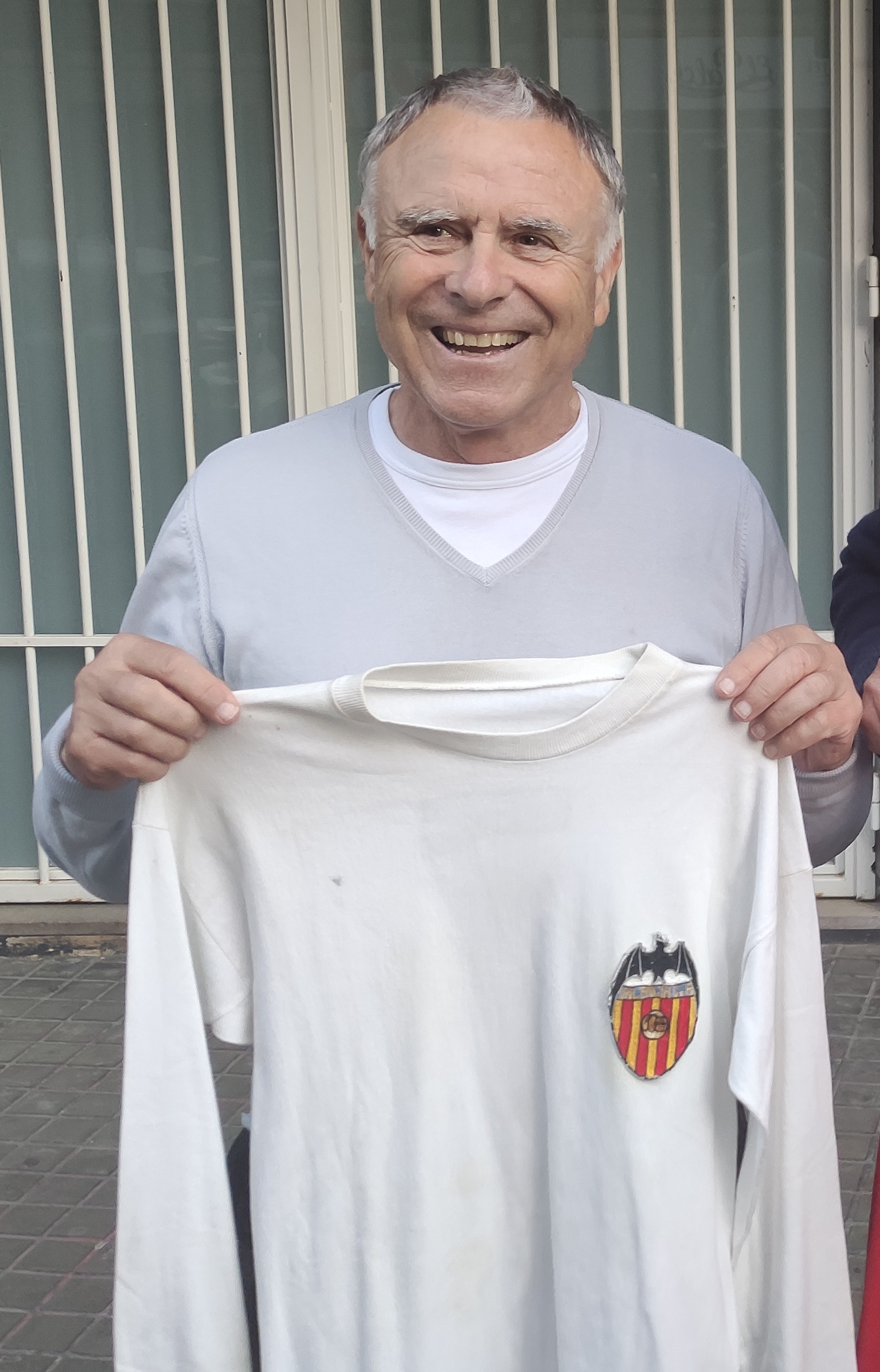
- Manzanera in 2023

Personal information
- Full name: Sergio Manzanera Lloret
- Date of birth: 10 November 1950 (age 75)
- Place of birth: Valencia, Spain
- Height: 1.67 m (5 ft 6 in)
- Position: Forward

Youth career
- Levante

Senior career*
Years	Team	Apps	(Gls)
1968–1970	Levante		
1970–1975	Valencia	123	(11)
1975–1977	Racing Santander	59	(1)
Total		182+	(12+)
- * Club domestic league appearances and goals

Sergio Manzanera Lloret (born 10 November 1950), known simply as Sergio as a player, is a Spanish former footballer who played as a forward.

He played 182 La Liga games and scored 12 goals in the league, for Valencia and Racing Santander, and won the league with the former in 1970–71. In September 1975, he and Racing teammate Aitor Agirre were prosecuted in the final weeks of Francoist Spain for protesting against the last use of capital punishment in Spain.

Manzanera retired through injury in 1978, aged 28. He then studied medicine and became a dentist.

== Career ==
Born in Valencia, Manzanera came through the youth ranks of Levante in his home city. After winning a regional youth league, he was put in the first team in the Tercera División aged 17, playing two seasons. During the construction of the Estadi Ciutat de València, the team rented Valencia CF's Mestalla Stadium; Valencia manager Alfredo Di Stéfano was impressed by the 19-year-old and paid 1 million Spanish pesetas to sign him from Levante.

In Manzanera's first season at Valencia CF, he won La Liga. On 14 March 1971, he scored an "Olympic goal" from a corner kick in a 4–0 home win over Atlético Bilbao, beating Spanish international goalkeeper José Ángel Iribar. Two weeks later he provided the corner from which José Vicente Forment scored a last-minute winner at home to Celta Vigo in a crucial late fixture.

Feeling that he had not made progress at Valencia, Manzanera left for newly promoted Racing de Santander in 1975. In October 1976, playing away to Burgos, his leg was broken by José Luis Romero, an injury that led to his retirement aged 28 in 1978.

== Black ribbon incident ==
On 27 September 1975, in the last weeks of Francisco Franco's life, his regime executed two members of ETA and three of the Revolutionary Antifascist Patriotic Front (FRAP). It was the last use of capital punishment in Spain.

Manzanera and Aitor Agirre were informed of the executions that night by listening to the banned communist pirate radio station Radio España Independiente at Racing's hotel. The pair agreed to make a stand in the following day's game at home to Elche by wearing black ribbons as impromptu black armbands.

In the 29th minute of the match, Manzanera assisted the opening goal by Agirre. The Racing fans, from a city with a dominance of right-wing politics, then noted the armbands and booed the pair whenever they touched the ball.

At half-time, plain-clothes police informed the pair that they would be arrested if they did not hand over their armbands; they handed it over, and played the second half in which Agirre scored another goal in a Racing victory. The pair and the club's president were ordered to the police station; the employer made the excuse that the players were mourning the death of one of his predecessors, to which the police pointed out that only two players were doing so and in an unrehearsed manner.

Agirre and Manzanera were both fined 300,000 pesetas for the offence of "disturbing public order". Their mail was intercepted by authorities. The state initiated proceedings under anti-terrorism laws which could have seen the pair imprisoned for five years, but the case was dropped due to the dictator's death and the end of his regime.

Manzanera was threatened by far-right groups such as New Force for his gesture. During the controversy, he slept with a shotgun, which he had acquired legally as a hunter.

== Personal life ==
Manzanera, who had already studied chemistry for three years, began a medicine course after retiring from football. He studied one year in Santander and the rest in Málaga, graduating aged 33. After choosing work-related medicine as a specialism, he then entered dentistry.

Manzanera's father, from Cheste, was a postal officer during the Second Spanish Republic. After the Spanish Civil War, he was stripped of his qualifications and purged by Francoist Spain.
