= Manuel Mestre =

Spanish footballer (1935–2008)

Personal information
- Full name: Manuel Mestre Torres
- Date of birth: 7 January 1935
- Place of birth: Oliva, Spain
- Date of death: 31 August 2008 (aged 73)
- Place of death: Oliva, Spain
- Height: 1.71 m (5 ft 7 in)
- Position: Defender

Youth career
- Oliva
- Gandía

Senior career*
| Years | Team | Apps | (Gls) |
| 1955–1956 | Mestalla | 14 | (0) |
| 1956–1969 | Valencia | 323 | (3) |
| Total | | 337 | (3) |

International career
| 1957–1961 | Spain B | 7 | (0) |
| 1959–1961 | Spain | 2 | (0]) |

Managerial career
- 1969–1975: Mestalla
- 1975–1976: Valencia
- 1977: Valencia
- 1982: Valencia
- 1987–1988: Mestalla
- 1988: Gandía
- * Club domestic league appearances and goals

Manuel Mestre Torres (7 January 1935 – 31 August 2008), also known by the first name Manolo, was a Spanish footballer who played as a defender.

Mestre spent his entire professional career from 1956 to 1969 with Valencia, making 323 La Liga appearances, a club record surpassed by Ricardo Arias 20 years later. He played two games for the Spain national team, and managed Valencia on three brief occasions.

== Playing career ==
Born in Oliva, Province of Valencia, Mestre began his career with UD Oliva and CF Gandía before being signed by Valencia CF. He played 14 times in the Segunda División for the reserve team, C.D. Mestalla, before having his first-team call-up on 15 January 1956 for a 4–2 home win over UD Las Palmas in La Liga, under manager Carlos Iturraspe.

Mestre was part of the Valencia teams that won the Inter-Cities Fairs Cup twice consecutively in 1961–62 and 1962–63. In the first game of the latter season, he scored an own goal in a 4–2 home win over Celtic, the opponents' first ever goal in European competition. The third round against another Scottish club, Dunfermline Athletic, went to a play-off after a 6–6 aggregate draw, and Mestre scored the only goal of the decider at the Estádio do Restelo in Lisbon. He played in the 1967 Copa del Generalísimo final, a 2–1 win over Atlético de Bilbao in the Santiago Bernabéu Stadium.

On 2 March 1969, in one of his final appearances, Mestre scored the only penalty of his career to equalise in a 2–1 win away to Deportivo de La Coruña. He was instructed to take the kick by manager Joseíto.

Mestre played two games for the Spain national team: a 6–3 friendly win against Austria at his club ground of Mestalla on 22 November 1959 and a 1–0 win away to Morocco on 12 December 1961 in qualification for the 1962 FIFA World Cup.

== Style of play ==
Initially a left-sided defender used in roles similar to the modern winger, Mestre moved into central defence. He was known for his physical prowess as much as for his technical ability and positioning. He rarely missed games through injury throughout his career.

== Managerial career ==
Having been a long-term manager of the reserve team, Mestre also managed Valencia in three spells. He was first hired in September 1975 after the dismissal of Yugoslav Dragoljub Milošević, winning 4–2 away to Las Palmas on his debut on 27 September. At the end of the 1975–76 La Liga season the club hired Paraguayan Heriberto Herrera, who left in February 1977 and succeeded by Mestre for the remainder of the campaign. Mestre's third spell in charge began in January 1982 after the resignation of Pasieguito; he received the job permanently in July after negotiations for César Luis Menotti, the 1978 FIFA World Cup-winning Argentina manager, broke down. In October 1982, he was replaced by Miljan Miljanić.

== Death ==
Mestre died of a long illness on 31 August 2008 in his birthplace of Oliva, aged 73.

== Honours ==
Valencia

- Inter-Cities Fairs Cup: 1961–62, 1962–63
- Copa del Generalísimo: 1966–67
