= Roberto Gil (footballer) =

Spanish footballer and coach (1938–2022)

Personal information
- Full name: Roberto Gil Esteve
- Date of birth: 30 July 1938
- Place of birth: Paterna, Spain
- Date of death: 5 August 2022 (aged 84)
- Position: Midfielder

Senior career*
Years	Team	Apps	(Gls)
1956–1959	Valencia Mestalla		
1959–1970	Valencia	210	(28)
1970–1971	Calvo Sotelo	12	(0)
Total		222+	(28+)

Managerial career
- 1977–1979: Gandía
- 1979–1980: Real Jaén
- 1981–1982: Levante
- 1983–1984: Gandía
- 1984–1985: Valencia
- 1986: Castellón
- 1988: Valencia
- 1995: Castellón
- * Club domestic league appearances and goals

Roberto Gil Esteve (30 July 1938 – 5 August 2022) was a Spanish professional football player and coach.

== Career ==
Born in Paterna, Gil played as a midfielder for Valencia Mestalla, Valencia and Calvo Sotelo. He served as captain of Valencia.

As a coach he managed Gandía, Real Jaén, Levante, Valencia and Castellón. He also worked as a director at Valencia.
