= Óscar Valdez (footballer) =

Football player and manager (1946–2025)

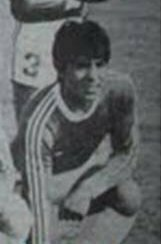
- Valdez in 1979

Personal information
- Full name: Rubén Óscar Valdez Ferrero
- Date of birth: 25 June 1946
- Place of birth: Buenos Aires, Argentina
- Date of death: 16 February 2025 (aged 78)
- Place of death: Valencia, Spain
- Height: 1.70 m (5 ft 7 in)
- Position: Striker

Senior career*
Years	Team	Apps	(Gls)
1967–1968	Almirante Brown	44	(10)
1969–1970	Platense	54	(12)
1971–1978	Valencia	163	(42)
1979	Castellón	7	(0)
1979	Kimberley	5	(0)
Total		273	(64)

International career
1972–1974	Spain	9	(5)

Managerial career
- 1984–1985: Mestalla
- 1985–1986: Valencia
- 1986–1987: Gandía
- 1988–1989: Poli Almería
- 1990: Paraguay
- 1992–1993: Valencia B
- * Club domestic league appearances and goals

Rubén Óscar Valdez Ferrero (25 June 1946 – 16 February 2025) was a professional football player and manager who played as a striker. Born in Argentina, he played the majority of his career for Spanish club Valencia C.F. and also represented the Spain national team.

== Club career ==
Valdez began his playing career in 1967 with Almirante Brown of the Argentine 2nd division. In 1969, he joined Club Atlético Platense of the Primera División where he played 54 games and scored 12 goals in his time at the club.

In the 1970–71 season, he signed for Valencia C.F. of Spain, he won the Spanish league championship with the club in his first season. He played for the club until 1978 making 195 appearances and scoring 51 goals all competitions. Between 1977 and 1978 he played alongside fellow Argentine striker Mario Kempes.

In 1979 Valdez left Valencia to play for CD Castellón but before the end of the year he had returned to Argentina to join Kimberley where he made five appearances, including a famous 2–1 victory against River Plate on 9 September 1979. before his retirement at the end of the year.

== International career ==
Valdez was first selected to play for Spain in 1972. He made his debut in a 2–0 home win against Uruguay on 23 May 1972, in which he scored one of the goals. His final international appearance came on 13 February 1974 in a 1–0 defeat to Yugoslavia in Frankfurt in a qualification game for the 1974 FIFA World Cup.

== Personal life and death ==
Valdez was born in Buenos Aires, Argentina on 25 June 1946. He died from complications of Alzheimer's disease in Valencia, Spain on 16 February 2025, at the age of 78.

== Legacy ==
Platense have a filial club in Spain which has adopted the name Peña Calamar Óscar Valdez in his honour.

== Honours ==
- La Liga: 1970-71

== See also ==
- List of Spain international footballers born outside Spain
