= Abelardo González =

Spanish footballer (1944–2021)

Personal information
- Full name: Ángel Abelardo González Bernardo
- Date of birth: 3 September 1944
- Place of birth: Sotrondio, Spain
- Date of death: 5 May 2021 (aged 76)
- Place of death: Valencia, Spain
- Height: 1.74 m (5 ft 9 in)
- Position: Goalkeeper

Youth career
- El Entrego

Senior career*
Years	Team	Apps	(Gls)
1963–1965	Langreo	42	(0)
1965–1974	Valencia	125	(0)
1974–1976	Sporting Gijón	23	(0)
- Quart
Total		190	(0)

International career
- Spain U23
- * Club domestic league appearances and goals

Ángel Abelardo González Bernardo (3 September 1944 – 5 May 2021) was a Spanish professional footballer who played as a goalkeeper.

== Career ==
Born in Sotrondio, González played for El Entrego, Langreo, Valencia (winning the league title in 1970–71 season), Sporting Gijón and Quart. He was also a Spain under-23 international.

After retiring as a player he remained in Valencia, running several businesses.

== Honours ==
=== Club ===
Valencia

- La Liga: 1970–71
- Copa del Generalísimo: 1966–67

=== Individual ===
- Ricardo Zamora Trophy: 1970–71
