= Manuel Polinario =

Spanish association football player

Personal information
- Full name: Manuel Polinario Muñoz
- Date of birth: 12 June 1943 (age 83)
- Place of birth: Puente Genil, Spain
- Height: 1.66 m (5 ft 5 in)
- Position: Forward

Youth career
- Puente Genil

Senior career*
Years	Team	Apps	(Gls)
1960–1963	Calvo Sotelo		
1963–1964	Mestalla	27	(12)
1964–1971	Valencia	146	(16)
1971–1974	Español	83	(6)
1974–1975	Recreativo Huelva	25	(1)
Total		281+	(35+)

International career
1968	Spain	1	(0)

Managerial career
- 1975: Recreativo Huelva
- 1977–1978: Júpiter
- 1978–1979: Getafe Deportivo
- 1979–1980: Badalona
- 1980–1981: Getafe Deportivo
- 1981–1983: Sabadell
- 1984: Ceuta
- 1985: Antequerano
- * Club domestic league appearances and goals

Manuel Polinario Muñoz (born 12 June 1943), also known as Poli, is a Spanish former football player and manager.

As a forward, he played 229 La Liga games and scored 22 goals for Valencia and Español, winning the league title in 1967 and the national cup in 1971 for the former. He earned one cap for Spain in 1968.

Polinario managed Recreativo de Huelva, Getafe Deportivo and Sabadell in the Segunda División from 1975 to 1983.

== Club career ==
Born in Puente Genil in the Province of Córdoba, Polinario began playing as a youth at his hometown club in a left-wing position. Once he was old enough to play in the Tercera División, he had two years at Calvo Sotelo before joining Valencia in 1963.

Polinario's Valencia career began with Mestalla, the reserve team, in the Segunda División. He then broke through into the first team and won La Liga in 1966–67 and the Copa del Generalísimo in 1971.

Polinario then moved to Español in a deal that saw Lico transfer in the other direction. At the Barcelona-based club, Polinario moved into a more central position alongside José Claramunt, distributing the ball to teammates. He returned to the second tier with Recreativo de Huelva in 1974 and retired a year later.

Polinario began his managerial career at Recreativo for the conclusion of the 1974–75 Segunda División season, later managing Getafe Deportivo then Badalona in 1979–80. He returned to second-tier Getafe Deportivo during a turbulent period in which the club president resigned and the administration was taken over as a worker cooperative; when a contract renewal was offered to him in July 1981 with no incentives, he moved to Sabadell in the same league.

== International career ==
Polinario was part of the Spain team that won the World Military Cup on home soil in 1965. On 3 April 1968 he played his only game for the Spain national football team, a 1–0 loss to world champions England at Wembley Stadium in UEFA Euro 1968 qualification. He marked Bobby Charlton in the match and as of 2023 was the only person from his hometown to represent Spain, and the second from his province after Manolo Reina. Polinario had turned down an invitation to play against Sweden in February in order to reserve his energy for the England match, and was not chosen for the return leg in the Santiago Bernabeu Stadium as manager Domènec Balmanya preferred Real Madrid local Ramón Grosso.
