= Fernando Ansola =

Spanish footballer (1940–1986)

Personal information
- Full name: Fernando Ansola San Martín
- Date of birth: 27 January 1940
- Place of birth: Elgóibar, Guipúzcoa, Spain
- Date of death: 30 June 1986 (aged 46)
- Position: Forward

Senior career*
| Years | Team | Apps | (Gls) |
| 1959–1961 | Real Oviedo | 16 | (8) |
| 1961–1966 | Real Betis | 114 | (54) |
| 1966–1971 | Valencia | 106 | (34) |
| 1971–1975 | Real Sociedad | 87 | (34) |

International career
| 1965–1968 | Spain | 5 | (0) |
- * Club domestic league appearances and goals

Fernando Ansola (27 January 1940 – 30 June 1986) was a Spanish footballer who played as a forward for La Liga club Valencia and scored 4 goals during the 1970–71 season. He made five appearances for the Spain national team.
