= Fernando Barrachina =

Spanish footballer (1947–2016)

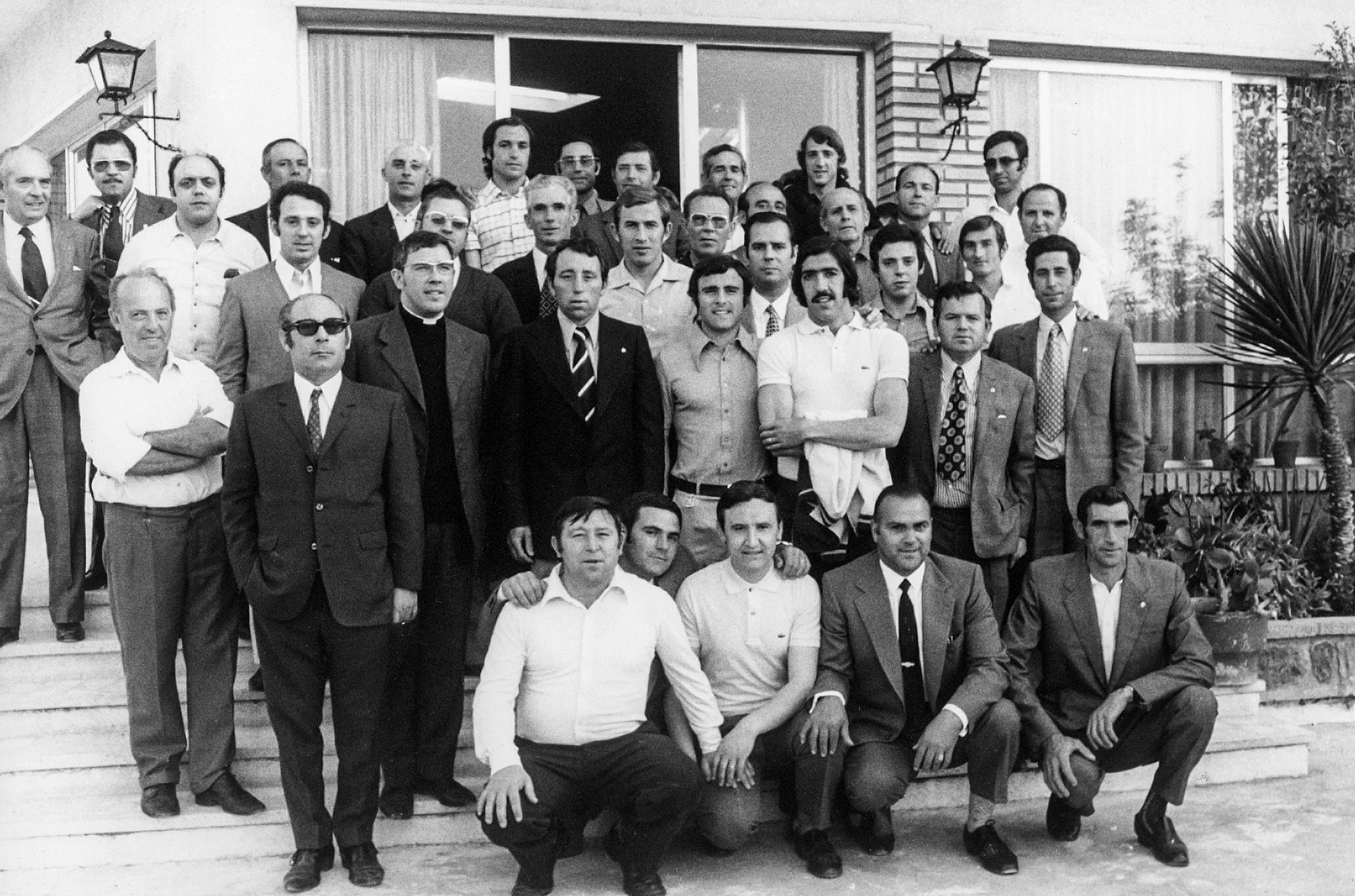
- Barrachina, with his signature moustache, surrounded by people while visiting Alginet (1973).

Personal information
- Full name: Fernando Barrachina Plo
- Date of birth: 24 February 1947
- Place of birth: Granada, Spain
- Date of death: 4 January 2016 (aged 68)
- Place of death: Valencia, Spain
- Height: 1.84 m (6 ft 1/2 in)
- Position: Central defender

Youth career
- Granada

Senior career*
Years	Team	Apps	(Gls)
1966–1969	Granada	63	(3)
1969–1977	Valencia	146	(1)
1977–1979	Cádiz	33	(0)
1979–1980	Quart Poblet		
Total		242	(4)

International career
1969–1970	Spain U23	4	(0)
1969	Spain	1	(0)
- * Club domestic league appearances and goals

Fernando Barrachina Plo (24 February 1947 – 4 January 2016) was a Spanish professional footballer who played as a central defender.

== Career ==
Born in Granada, Barrachina played for Granada, Valencia and Cádiz.

He made one international appearance for Spain in 1969.

== Later life and death ==
He died on 4 January 2016, at the age of 68.
