= Vicente Guillot =

Spanish footballer

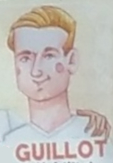
- Guillot drawn for the Falla Tio Pep 2019

Personal information
- Full name: Vicente Guillot Fabián
- Date of birth: 15 July 1941 (age 85)
- Place of birth: Aldaia, Spain
- Position: Forward

Youth career
- Valencia

Senior career*
Years	Team	Apps	(Gls)
1959–1961	Mestalla		
1961–1970	Valencia	153	(50)
1970–1972	Elche	14	(2)

International career
1959	Spain U18	3	(3)
1961	Spain B	1	(0)
1962–1965	Spain	6	(4)
- * Club domestic league appearances and goals

Vicente Guillot Fabián (born 15 July 1941 in Aldaia, Valencian Community) is a retired Spanish footballer.

During his career he played for Mestalla CF, Valencia CF and Elche CF. He also earned 6 caps for the Spain national football team.

== International goals ==
#	Date	Venue	Opponent	Score	Result	Competition
1.	1 November 1962	Santiago Bernabéu, Madrid, Spain	Romania	1–0	6–0	1964 European Nations' Cup qualifying
2.	1 November 1962	Santiago Bernabéu, Madrid, Spain	Romania	4–0	6–0	1964 European Nations' Cup qualifying
3.	1 November 1962	Santiago Bernabéu, Madrid, Spain	Romania	5–0	6–0	1964 European Nations' Cup qualifying
4.	2 December 1962	Heysel, Brussels, Belgium	Belgium	0–1	1–1	Friendly

== Honours ==
Valencia

- Inter-Cities Fairs Cup: 1961–62, 1962–63
- Spanish Cup: 1966–67
