= José Claramunt =

Spanish footballer

Personal information
- Full name: José Claramunt Torres
- Date of birth: 10 July 1946 (age 80)
- Place of birth: Puçol, Spain
- Height: 1.65 m (5 ft 5 in)
- Position: Midfielder

Youth career
- Valencia
- → Atlético Saguntino (loan)

Senior career*
Years	Team	Apps	(Gls)
1965–1966	Mestalla	30	(2)
1966–1978	Valencia	294	(54)
Total		324	(56)

International career
1968–1975	Spain	23	(4)
- * Club domestic league appearances and goals

José Claramunt Torres (born 10 July 1946) is a Spanish retired footballer who played as a midfielder.

He played solely for Valencia, competing in 12 La Liga seasons and appearing in 381 official games (83 goals scored).

== Club career ==
Born in Puçol, Valencian Community, Claramunt spent his entire career with local club Valencia CF. He made his La Liga debut on 11 September 1966 in a 1–0 away win against Deportivo de La Coruña, and scored his first goal in the competition on 27 November in a 3–0 home victory over Sevilla FC.

Claramunt scored three goals in 30 games in the 1970–71 campaign to help the Che win the national championship, including one in a 2–0 win at FC Barcelona on 31 October 1970. Additionally, during his spell, the side appeared in four Copa del Rey finals – losing three in a row from 1970 to 1972 – and he opened the scoring in the 1971 edition against Barcelona, netting from a penalty kick but in a 3–4 extra-time defeat.

Claramunt retired in 1978, at the age of nearly 32. His hometown club UD Puçol's ground was named Estadio José Claramunt in his honour.

== International career ==
Claramunt earned 23 caps for Spain over seven years, scoring four times. He made his debut on 28 February 1968 in a 3–1 friendly win against Sweden, and netted his first goal on 17 January 1973 in a 3–2 victory in Greece for the 1974 FIFA World Cup qualifiers.

For six games, Claramunt acted as national team captain due to the absence of Amancio.

=== International goals ===
No.	Date	Venue	Opponent	Score	Result	Competition	Ref.
1.	17 January 1973	Leoforos, Athens, Greece	Greece	2–2	3–2	1974 World Cup qualification	
2.	21 February 1973	La Rosaleda, Málaga, Spain	Greece	1–0	3–1	1974 World Cup qualification	
3.	24 November 1973	Neckarstadion, Stuttgart, West Germany	West Germany	1–2	1–2	Friendly	
4.	25 September 1974	Idrætsparken, Copenhagen, Denmark	Denmark	1–0	2–1	Euro 1976 qualifying	

== Personal life ==
Claramunt's younger brother, Enrique, was also a footballer. He too represented Valencia and they shared teams during four seasons, being thus known as Claramunt I and Claramunt II.

== Honours ==
- La Liga: 1970–71
- Copa del Generalísimo: 1966–67; Runner-up 1969–70, 1970–71, 1971–72

== See also ==
- List of one-club men
