= Juan Sol =

Spanish footballer (1947–2020)

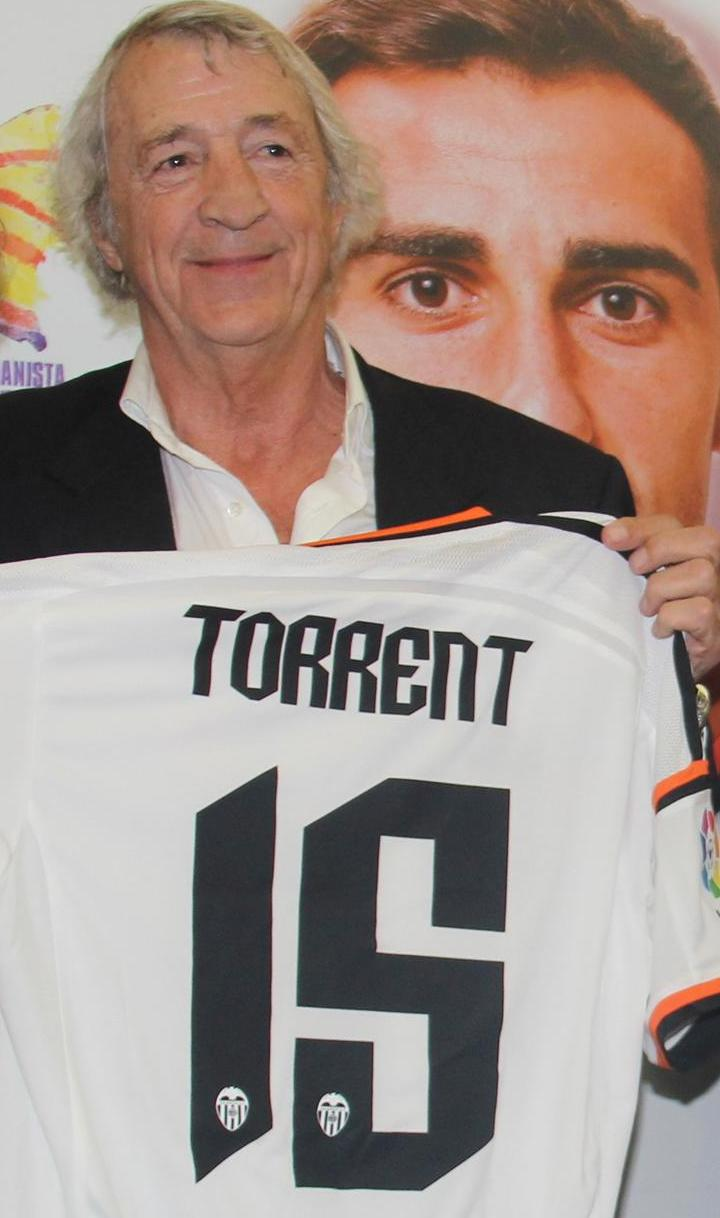

Personal information
- Full name: Juan Cruz Sol Oria
- Date of birth: 13 September 1947
- Place of birth: Elgoibar, Spain
- Date of death: 10 November 2020 (aged 73)
- Place of death: Valencia, Spain
- Height: 1.80 m (5 ft 11 in)
- Position: Defender

Youth career
- Elgoibar
- Valencia

Senior career*
Years	Team	Apps	(Gls)
1965–1975	Valencia	229	(14)
1975–1979	Real Madrid	110	(0)
1979–1981	Valencia	8	(0)
Total		347	(14)

International career
1966	Spain U18	6	(0)
1969–1970	Spain U23	3	(0)
1970–1976	Spain	28	(1)
- * Club domestic league appearances and goals

Juan Cruz Sol Oria (13 September 1947 – 10 November 2020) was a Spanish footballer, who played as a defender.

== International career ==
He played 28 matches for Spain national football team, and scored 1 goal.

=== International goals ===
#	Date	Venue	Opponent	Score	Result	Competition
1.	21 February 1973	La Rosaleda, Málaga, Spain	Greece	2–1	3–1	1974 World Cup qualification

== Honours ==
Valencia

- 1 Spanish League: 1970–71
- 1 Spanish Cup: 1966–67
- 1 UEFA Cup Winners' Cup: 1979–80
- 1 UEFA Super Cup: 1980

Real Madrid

- 3 Spanish League: 1975–76, 1977–78, 1978–79

== Death ==
Sol died on 10 November 2020 at the age of 73.
