= 1970–71 La Liga =

40th season of La Liga

Primera División
- Season: 1970–71
- Champions: Valencia (4th title)
- Relegated: Elche; Zaragoza
- European Cup: Valencia
- Cup Winners' Cup: Barcelona
- UEFA Cup: Atlético Madrid; Real Madrid; Athletic Bilbao; Celta Vigo
- Matches: 240
- Goals: 543 (2.26 per match)
- Top goalscorer: José Eulogio Gárate; Carles Rexach (17 goals each)
- Biggest home win: Elche 5–0 Sporting Gijón; Las Palmas 5–0 Sabadell
- Biggest away win: Zaragoza 0–5 Real Madrid

The 1970–71 La Liga was the 40th season since its establishment. The season began on 12 September 1970, and concluded on 18 April 1971. Valencia won its fourth title.

== Team locations ==
Location of teams in the 1970–71 La Liga
Canary Islands

| Team | Home city | Stadium |
|---|---|---|
| Athletic Bilbao | Bilbao | San Mamés |
| Atlético Madrid | Madrid | Vicente Calderón |
| Barcelona | Barcelona | Nou Camp |
| Celta | Vigo | Balaídos |
| Elche | Elche | Altabix |
| Español | Barcelona | Sarriá |
| Granada | Granada | Los Cármenes |
| Las Palmas | Las Palmas | Insular |
| Málaga | Málaga | La Rosaleda |
| Real Madrid | Madrid | Santiago Bernabéu |
| Real Sociedad | San Sebastián | Atocha |
| Sabadell | Sabadell | Creu Alta |
| Sevilla | Seville | Ramón Sánchez Pizjuán |
| Sporting Gijón | Gijón | El Molinón |
| Valencia | Valencia | Luis Casanova |
| Zaragoza | Zaragoza | La Romareda |

== League table ==
| Pos | Team | Pld | W | D | L | GF | GA | GD | Pts | Qualification or relegation |
|---|---|---|---|---|---|---|---|---|---|---|
| 1 | Valencia (C) | 30 | 18 | 7 | 5 | 41 | 19 | +22 | 43 | Qualification for the European Cup first round |
| 2 | Barcelona | 30 | 19 | 5 | 6 | 50 | 22 | +28 | 43 | Qualification for the Cup Winners' Cup first round (Note: Barcelona qualified to the Cup Winners' Cup as champions of the Copa del Generalísimo.) |
| 3 | Atlético Madrid | 30 | 17 | 8 | 5 | 51 | 20 | +31 | 42 | Qualification for the UEFA Cup first round |
| 4 | Real Madrid | 30 | 17 | 7 | 6 | 46 | 24 | +22 | 41 | Qualification for the UEFA Cup first round |
| 5 | Atlético Bilbao | 30 | 14 | 7 | 9 | 40 | 31 | +9 | 35 | Qualification for the UEFA Cup first round |
| 6 | Celta Vigo | 30 | 15 | 5 | 10 | 37 | 32 | +5 | 35 | Qualification for the UEFA Cup first round |
| 7 | Sevilla | 30 | 13 | 6 | 11 | 34 | 42 | −8 | 32 | |
| 8 | Real Sociedad | 30 | 10 | 9 | 11 | 23 | 27 | −4 | 29 | |
| 9 | Málaga | 30 | 8 | 12 | 10 | 27 | 32 | −5 | 28 | |
| 10 | Granada | 30 | 10 | 8 | 12 | 33 | 34 | −1 | 28 | |
| 11 | Español | 30 | 8 | 9 | 13 | 18 | 25 | −7 | 25 | |
| 12 | Sporting Gijón | 30 | 10 | 5 | 15 | 35 | 44 | −9 | 25 | |
| 13 | Sabadell | 30 | 8 | 5 | 17 | 28 | 49 | −21 | 21 | |
| 14 | Las Palmas | 30 | 5 | 10 | 15 | 33 | 42 | −9 | 20 | |
| 15 | Elche (R) | 30 | 4 | 10 | 16 | 25 | 46 | −21 | 18 | Relegation to the Segunda División |
| 16 | Zaragoza (R) | 30 | 3 | 9 | 18 | 22 | 54 | −32 | 15 | Relegation to the Segunda División |

Source: BDFútbol
Rules for classification: 1) Points; 2) Head-to-head results; 3) Goal difference; 4) Number of goals scored
(C) Champions; (R) Relegated

== Results ==
| Home \ Away | ATB | ATM | BAR | CEL | ELC | ESP | GRA | LPA | MLG | RGI | RMA | RSO | SAB | SEV | VAL | ZAR |
|---|---|---|---|---|---|---|---|---|---|---|---|---|---|---|---|---|
| Athletic Bilbao | | 1–0 | 1–1 | 2–0 | 2–0 | 2–0 | 3–0 | 1–0 | 2–1 | 3–0 | 0–1 | 1–1 | 1–0 | 1–0 | 0–0 | 3–0 |
| Atlético Madrid | 2–0 | | 1–1 | 3–1 | 3–1 | 3–0 | 3–0 | 2–1 | 2–1 | 2–0 | 2–2 | 1–0 | 4–1 | 4–1 | 3–0 | 3–0 |
| CF Barcelona | 0–1 | 2–0 | | 2–1 | 0–0 | 3–0 | 2–1 | 2–0 | 1–0 | 2–0 | 0–1 | 4–0 | 4–1 | 5–2 | 0–2 | 5–2 |
| Celta de Vigo | 2–1 | 3–2 | 1–1 | | 3–0 | 1–0 | 2–0 | 1–0 | 0–0 | 2–0 | 2–0 | 0–0 | 1–0 | 2–0 | 1–0 | 2–0 |
| Elche CF | 1–1 | 0–4 | 0–1 | 1–1 | | 1–1 | 1–1 | 2–0 | 1–1 | 5–0 | 0–1 | 1–2 | 0–0 | 1–0 | 1–3 | 2–1 |
| RCD Español | 1–0 | 0–0 | 0–1 | 0–1 | 2–0 | | 1–0 | 2–1 | 1–1 | 2–0 | 0–1 | 0–0 | 3–1 | 0–1 | 1–0 | 0–0 |
| Granada CF | 2–2 | 0–0 | 0–2 | 1–0 | 3–1 | 1–0 | | 1–0 | 1–1 | 3–0 | 2–0 | 2–0 | 3–1 | 0–0 | 2–2 | 3–0 |
| UD Las Palmas | 1–1 | 1–1 | 3–2 | 1–2 | 2–2 | 0–0 | 2–0 | | 1–2 | 1–2 | 0–0 | 4–2 | 5–0 | 0–0 | 0–0 | 4–0 |
| CD Málaga | 3–3 | 0–0 | 0–1 | 2–1 | 1–0 | 0–0 | 1–0 | 1–1 | | 3–0 | 0–2 | 0–0 | 1–0 | 1–1 | 0–1 | 1–0 |
| Sporting Gijón | 3–1 | 1–1 | 0–2 | 4–0 | 3–1 | 0–1 | 3–2 | 2–0 | 3–0 | | 0–1 | 2–0 | 3–2 | 4–0 | 0–1 | 1–1 |
| Real Madrid | 1–2 | 1–0 | 0–1 | 4–0 | 1–1 | 1–0 | 3–2 | 4–2 | 2–2 | 1–1 | | 1–0 | 3–1 | 4–0 | 2–0 | 2–1 |
| Real Sociedad | 2–1 | 0–1 | 1–0 | 1–3 | 2–0 | 1–0 | 1–1 | 1–0 | 1–2 | 3–1 | 0–0 | | 2–0 | 1–0 | 0–0 | 2–0 |
| CE Sabadell FC | 1–0 | 0–2 | 2–1 | 3–2 | 1–0 | 0–0 | 0–1 | 0–0 | 5–2 | 2–1 | 1–1 | 0–0 | | 2–1 | 0–1 | 2–1 |
| Sevilla CF | 3–2 | 1–1 | 0–1 | 2–1 | 2–1 | 1–0 | 1–0 | 3–1 | 1–0 | 1–1 | 3–1 | 1–0 | 1–0 | | 2–2 | 4–2 |
| Valencia CF | 4–0 | 1–0 | 1–1 | 2–1 | 3–0 | 2–1 | 2–1 | 5–1 | 1–0 | 1–0 | 1–0 | 0–0 | 2–1 | 0–1 | | 2–0 |
| Zaragoza | 1–2 | 0–1 | 1–2 | 0–0 | 1–1 | 2–2 | 0–0 | 1–1 | 0–0 | 0–0 | 0–5 | 1–0 | 3–1 | 4–1 | 0–2 | |

Legend: Blue = home team win; Yellow = draw; Red = away team win.

== Pichichi Trophy ==
| Rank | Player | Club | Goals |
|---|---|---|---|
| 1 | (Spain) José Eulogio Gárate | Atlético Madrid | 17 |
| 1 | (Spain) Carles Rexach | Barcelona | 17 |
| 3 | (Paraguay) Bernardo Acosta | Sevilla | 13 |
| 3 | (Spain) Pirri | Real Madrid | 13 |
| 3 | (Spain) Quini | Sporting Gijón | 13 |
| 6 | (Spain) Javier Irureta | Atlético Madrid | 12 |
| 7 | (Spain) Fidel Uriarte | Athletic Bilbao | 11 |
