= Abílio De Jesus =

Portuguese engineer, researcher and professor

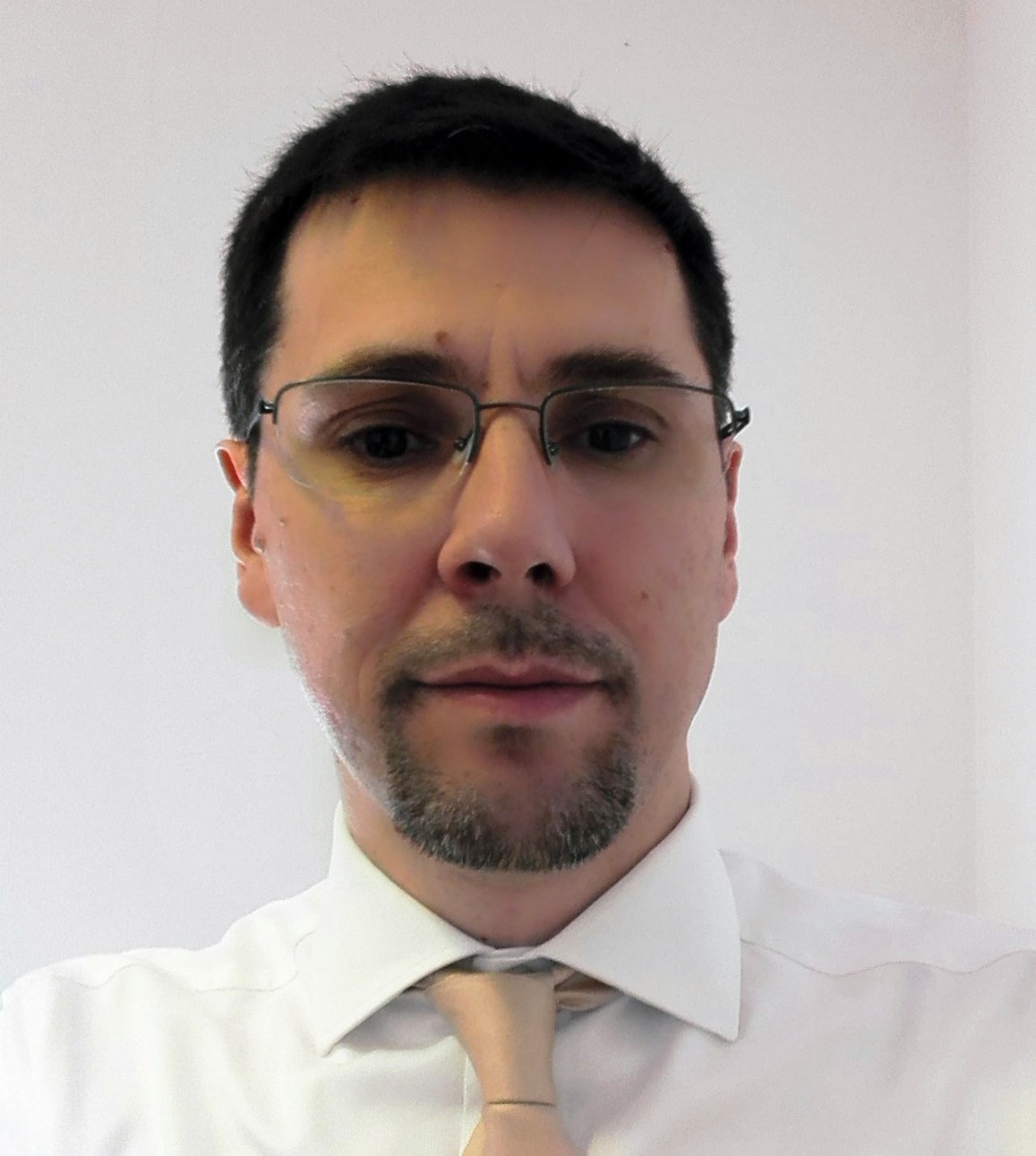
- July, 2020
- Born: 25 April 1973 (age 53); Marco de Canaveses, Portugal
- Education: University of Porto in Portugal and University of Trás-os-Montes and Alto Douro in Portugal
- Scientific career
- Fields: Engineering, Structural integrity and failure, Materials science
- Workplaces: University of Porto in Porto (Portugal)
- Website: Abílio De Jesus

Abílio De Jesus (born 25 April 1973) is a Portuguese researcher, professor and engineer in the field of the fatigue, fracture and integrity of materials and structural components.

== Biography ==
Abílio De Jesus is graduated in mechanical engineering at the University of Porto, Portugal (1996). In 1999, he obtained the Master Science in Mechanical Engineering at the University of Porto (Portugal). In 2004, he completed his Ph.D. in Mechanical Engineering at the University of Trás-os-Montes and Alto Douro (Portugal). Abílio De Jesus joined at the University of Trás-os-Montes and Alto Douro (Portugal) in Vila Real in 1997. In 2014 he became a professor and continued to teach and research at the University of Porto, Portugal.

Since 2017, he is a scientific secretary of the technical committees ESIS TC12 on Risk Analysis and Safety of Large Structures and Components of European Structural Integrity Society.

His scientific work in the area of fatigue and structural integrity was distinguished by the Wrocław University of Science and Technology (Poland).

He is Editor-in-chief or Editor and member of the editorial board of several scientific journals and book series, such as:

- Editor-in-Chief of the Structural Integrity book series

- Editor-in-Chief of the Proceedings of the Institution of Civil Engineers: Transport

- Editor-in-Chief of the Journal of the Mechanical Behavior of Materials

- Member of the editorial board of the International Journal of Structural Integrity
