= Filippo Berto =

Italian professor and engineer

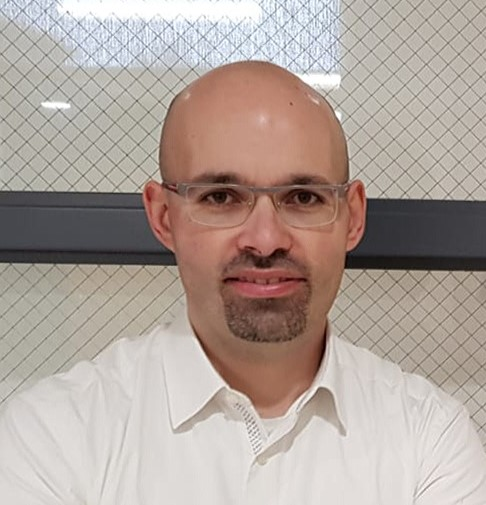
- Berto in 19 July 2020
- Born: 12 February 1978 (age 48); Vicenza, Italy
- Education: University of Padua; University of Florence
- Awards: Order of the Star of Italy
- Scientific career
- Fields: Fracture mechanics Fatigue; Additive manufacturing
- Workplaces: Sapienza University of Rome
- Website: Filippo Berto

Filippo Berto (born 12 February 1978) is an Italian professor and engineer, who works on fracture and fatigue mechanics at the Sapienza University of Rome. He is the vice president of the European Structural Integrity Society.

Berto received the Order of the Star of Italy in 2021 and multiple awards from the European Structural Integrity Society. Berto has held significant international positions, including a chair at the Norwegian University of Science and Technology and was a Distinguished Changjiang Chair Professor at Xi'an Jiaotong University from 2020 to 2023.

According to Scopus, in 2021, Berto published 179 articles, approximately an article every two days. He is in the list of 2% top scientist released by Stanford University with 1,216 peer-reviewed articles and 26,341 citations, as of April 2024. Despite his contributions, in 2024, Berto's work has faced scrutiny for questionable practices, leading to retractions and loss of editorial board positions.

== Biography ==
Filippo Berto was born 12 February 1978 in Vicenza, Italy. In 2003, he obtained a degree in Industrial Engineering from the University of Padua. After that, he completed his Ph.D. in Mechanical Engineering at the University of Florence, in 2006.

He was professor of machine design at the University of Padua, Italy, between 2006 and 2015. Since 2022, Berto is a full professor and is a chair in the mechanics of materials at the Sapienza University of Rome. Berto was an international chair in mechanics of materials, mechanical metallurgy, fracture mechanics, fatigue, and structural integrity at the Norwegian University of Science and Technology of Trondheim, Norway, from 2016 to 2022.

Berto has been visiting professor at Stanford University where he has collaborated with the Nanoscale Prototyping Laboratory. He is also holding some honorary chair professorship at Hong Kong Polytechnic University and Mandela Metropolitan University. In 2021, he was a Distinguished Changjiang Chair Professor at Xi'an Jiaotong University through the Changjiang Scholars Program from 2020 to 2023.

Berto is also collaborating with the Centre of Excellence of additive manufacturing established in Auburn and in particular with Nima Shamsaei and Mohsen Seifi who is chair of additive manufacturing programs in ASTM. Berto is also voting member of ASTM F42 on Additive Manufacturing Technologies and ASTM E08 on Metal Fatigue and Fracture. He is chairman of the technical committee European Structural Integrity Society (ESIS) TC15 on Structural Integrity of additive manufactured components of ESIS. From 2021 and 2022, Berto is vice-president of the ESIS. He is also the vice president of the ESIS.

In 2023, Berto won a £2.5 million research grant as part of the ERC Advanced Grant.

Berto has a role in the Italian Group of Fracture being president since 2019 and co-editor-in-chief of the associated journal. He is in the editorial board of several scientific journals in the area of fatigue, fracture and structural integrity, such as, Materials & Design, Materials Science and Engineering: A, Advanced Engineering Materials, Polymer Testing, Strength of Materials, among others.

As technical Chair of TC15 is also the founder of the series of European conferences on additive manufacturing ESIAM. He is also one of the founder of the ESIS TC18 on Structural Integrity of Welded Joints and treasurer of the same TC.

Berto is in the list of 2% top scientist released by Stanford University. In Europe, he is among the first twenty positions in the field of Mechanical Engineering and Transports and among the first 3 positions dealing with fracture and fatigue problems. He is a top author in the last 5 years (2018–2022) in several topics such as (V-notches, Strain Energy Density, T-Stress) in Scopus, where he is also among the first three top authors all-time in fatigue.

== Prizes and honours ==
- ESIS Fellowship 2022, European Structural Integrity Society (2022)
- Order of the Star of Italy 2021, President of the Republic, Italy (2021)
- Robert Moskovic Award 2021, ESIS TC12 Technical Committee, European Structural Integrity Society (2021)
- August Wöhler Medal Medal for Fatigue, European Structural Integrity Society (2020)
- Structural Integrity Award of Merit, Springer Science+Business Media (2020)
- Paolo Lazzarin IGF Medal, Italian Group of Fracture (2019)
- Award of Merit, European Structural Integrity Society (2018)
- Stephen Timoshenko Fellow, University of Stanford (2018)
- CAPOCACCIA award, AIAS (2013)

== Scientific misconduct ==
The work of Berto has come under scrutiny for a range of questionable practices including: suspected self-plagiarism, authorship fraud, citation fraud, salami slicing, and misrepresentation of data. As of July 2024, this has so far resulted in the retraction of the following papers:

1. Razavi, S. M. J.; Ferro, P.; Berto, Filippo (September 2017). "RETRACTED ARTICLE: Fatigue Assessment of Ti–6Al–4V Circular Notched Specimens Produced by Selective Laser Melting". Strength of Materials. 49 (5): 738. Bibcode:2017StMat..49..738R. doi:10.1007/s11223-017-9884-2. ISSN 1573-9325. (Retracted, see doi:10.1007/s11223-017-9884-2, Retraction Watch)
2. Mohammadi, H.; Salavati, H.; Alizadeh, Y.; Abdullah, A.; Berto, Filippo (December 2017). "Retracted: Fracture investigation of U-notch made of tungsten–copper functionally graded materials by means of strain energy density". Fatigue & Fracture of Engineering Materials & Structures. 40 (12): 1984–1993. doi:10.1111/ffe.12616. ISSN 8756-758X. (Retracted, see doi:10.1111/ffe.13692, Retraction Watch)
3. Masoudi Nejad, Reza; Liu, Zhiliang; Ma, Wenchen; Berto, Filippo (November 2021). "RETRACTED: Reliability analysis of fatigue crack growth for rail steel under variable amplitude service loading conditions and wear". International Journal of Fatigue. 152 106450. doi:10.1016/j.ijfatigue.2021.106450. hdl:11573/1654519. ISSN 0142-1123. (Retracted, see doi:10.1016/j.ijfatigue.2024.108252, Retraction Watch)
4. Hashemi, Sina Abbaszadeh; Farhangdoost, Khalil; Ma, Wenchen; Moghadam, Danial Ghahremani; Nejad, Reza Masoudi; Berto, Filippo (December 2022). "RETRACTED: Effects of tensile overload on fatigue crack growth in AM60 magnesium alloys". Theoretical and Applied Fracture Mechanics. 122 103573. doi:10.1016/j.tafmec.2022.103573. ISSN 0167-8442. (Retracted, see doi:10.1016/j.tafmec.2024.104418, Retraction Watch)
5. Masoudi Nejad, Reza; Berto, Filippo; Tohidi, Mohammadreza; Jalayerian Darbandi, Ahmad; Sina, Nima (August 2021). "RETRACTED: An investigation on fatigue behavior of AA2024 aluminum alloy sheets in fuselage lap joints". Engineering Failure Analysis. 126 105457. doi:10.1016/j.engfailanal.2021.105457. ISSN 1350-6307. (Retracted, see doi:10.1016/j.engfailanal.2024.108350, Retraction Watch)
6. Razavi, Nima; Peron, M.; Mutignani, F.; Torgersen, J.; Berto, Filippo (2017). "RETRACTED: A Study on the Fatigue Behavior of Hot Dip Galvanized Steel Connections". Key Engineering Materials. 754: 241–243. doi:10.4028/www.scientific.net/KEM.754.241. ISSN 1662-9795. (Retracted, see doi:10.4028/www.scientific.net/KEM.754.241)
7. Razavi, Nima; Peron, M.; Mutignani, F.; Torgersen, J.; Berto, Filippo (2017). "RETRACTED: Fatigue Strength of Hot-Dip Galvanized Welded Steel Connections". Key Engineering Materials. 754: 244–247. doi:10.4028/www.scientific.net/KEM.754.244. ISSN 1662-9795. (Retracted, see doi:10.4028/www.scientific.net/KEM.754.244)

In March 2024, Berto lost his position on the editorial board of Theoretical and Applied Fracture Mechanics, coinciding with that journal's retraction of one of his papers. At around the same time, Berto also lost his editorial board positions at two further Elsevier journals: Engineering Failure Analysis and International Journal of Fatigue.

Following a complaint from a librarian working at the Inland Norway University of Applied Sciences and a recommendation by the research ethics committee at the Norwegian University of Science and Technology (NTNU), NTNU opened an investigation into Berto's work.

In May 2025, NTNU's Research Ethics Committee concluded that Berto had committed scientific misconduct through deliberate or grossly negligent reuse of his own work without appropriate citation, duplication of results across multiple publications, and irregular authorship practices. The investigation found that he systematically republished content with minimal changes while concealing overlap, thereby breaching norms of academic integrity. NTNU endorsed the findings, and Berto was given the right to appeal.
