= Curro (footballer, born 1943) =

Spanish footballer (born 1943)

Personal information
- Full name: Miguel Gómez Burgos
- Date of birth: 31 December 1943 (age 82)
- Place of birth: Mérida, Spain
- Height: 1.80 m (5 ft 11 in)
- Position: Midfielder

Youth career
- Imperio Mérida

Senior career*
Years	Team	Apps	(Gls)
1962–1965	Elche B		
1965–1971	Elche	81	(9)
1971–1972	Español	2	(0)
1972	Atlético Español		
1972–1973	Salamanca	21	(4)
1973–1974	Cacereño	36	(8)
Total		138+	(21+)

Managerial career
- 1974–1975: Cacereño
- Don Benito
- Atlético Marbella
- 1978–1979: Mérida Industrial
- 1979–1984: Ibiza
- 1990–1991: Ibiza
- * Club domestic league appearances and goals

Miguel Gómez Burgos (born 31 December 1943), known as Curro, is a Spanish former footballer who played as a midfielder.

He played 81 games and scored 9 goals in La Liga for Elche and Español, helping the former to the Copa del Generalísimo final in 1969.

== Career ==
Born in Mérida in Extremadura, Curro was a youth player at Imperio de Mérida. He helped the team to the regional youth championship in 1959 and 1962, before heavy defeats to Sevilla and Real Valladolid in the national phases, respectively.

After three months on trial at Real Madrid did not yield a contract, Curro signed for Elche, beginning with the reserve team, Ilicitano. On 6 April 1969, he scored the only goal of a home win over Real Madrid to end that team's 27-game unbeaten run from the start of the season; on 15 June he played their defeat to Atlético Bilbao in the Copa del Generalísimo final.

Curro left for Español in 1971, following Elche's relegation. Affected by injury in his only season, he moved to Mexico to play for Atlético Español. When he returned to Spain he signed for Salamanca to be nearer his home region, and in 1973 he chose Cacereño over an offer from Badajoz.

Curro began managing at Cacereño, followed by Don Benito, Atlético Marbella and Mérida Industrial. In 1979 he took over at Ibiza, and settled on the island for the coming decades. He was given the title of "Legend of Spanish Football" by the Balearic Islands Football Federation in 2015.
