= Vicente Iborra (footballer, born 1932) =

Spanish association football player

Personal information
- Full name: Vicente Iborra Richart
- Date of birth: 16 February 1932
- Place of birth: Xàtiva, Spain
- Date of death: 2 December 2020 (aged 88)
- Height: 1.73 m (5 ft 8 in)
- Positions: Defender; forward

Youth career
- Olímpico Játiva

Senior career*
Years	Team	Apps	(Gls)
1951–1954	Olímpico Játiva		
1954–1956	Mestalla	47+	(9+)
1956–1958	Valencia	16	(9)
1958–1960	Sporting Gijón	46	(17)
1960–1971	Elche	303	(10)
1971–1973	Olímpico Játiva		
Total		412+	(45+)

International career
1957	Spain B	1	(0)

Managerial career
- 1973–1974: Onteniente
- 1974–1975: Ibiza
- 1975–1976: Mestalla
- 1976–1977: Olímpico Játiva
- 1977: Onteniente
- 1979: Olímpico Játiva
- * Club domestic league appearances and goals

Vicente Iborra Richart (16 February 1932 – 3 December 2020) was a Spanish football player and manager.

Able to play as a forward or central defender, he played 347 games and scored 24 goals in La Liga for Valencia, Sporting Gijón and Elche. He totalled 354 games for the last of those clubs, including as captain in their loss in the 1969 Copa del Generalísimo final.

== Career ==
Born in Xàtiva in the Province of Valencia, Iborra began his career at local Olímpico de Játiva before joining Mestalla, the reserve team of Valencia CF. He made the first team in La Liga for 1956–57, scoring 11 goals in 20 games including the Copa del Generalísimo; Iborra played one game for the Spain national football B team, a 2–0 loss to Greece on 13 March 1957.

In 1958, Iborra transferred to Sporting de Gijón for 500,000 Spanish pesetas, enduring relegation in his first season in Asturias but scoring 12 goals in 18 games in the Segunda División in 1959–60. He joined Elche in 1960, remaining there for 11 years. During his time there, he was recast as a defender, and was credited by Alfredo Di Stéfano as the best of that position in Spain. He captained the team in the Copa del Generalísimo final on 15 June 1969, a 1–0 loss to Atlético Bilbao.

Iborra returned to Olímpico before retiring. He managed several lower-league teams including Onteniente, where he signed Francisco Ballester, a former Elche teammate and Xàtiva native whose spell at Real Madrid had been fraught with injury.

== Personal life ==
Iborra and his wife Pilar had five children. In 2013, their eldest daughter also named Pilar died aged 53, while president of CF Plus Xàtiva.

Iborra lived with dementia. He died aged 88 on 3 December 2020, weeks after the death of his wife.
