= Alfonso Fernández =

Alfonso Fernández may refer to:

- Alfonso Fernández el Niño (1243–1281), Spanish nobleman
- Alfonso Fernández de Bonilla (died 1600), Spanish prelate
- Alonso Fernández de Avellaneda (fl. 17th century), Spanish writer
- Alfonso Fernández-Canteli (born 1945), Spanish researcher and engineer
- Alfonso Fernández (boxer) (born 1951), Spanish boxer
- Alfonso Fernandez (footballer) (born 1963), Spanish footballer
- Alfonso Fernández Mañueco (born 1965), Spanish politician
