= 1969 Copa del Generalísimo final =

Copa del Generalísimo 1969 final
- Event: 1969 Copa del Generalísimo
Atlético Bilbao	Elche
1	0
- Date: 15 June 1969
- Venue: Santiago Bernabéu, Madrid
- Referee: Antonio Camacho
- Attendance: 120,000

The Copa del Generalísimo 1969 final was the 67th final of the King's Cup. The final was played at Santiago Bernabéu in Madrid, on 15 June 1969, being won by Club Atlético de Bilbao, who beat Elche CF 1–0.

== Match details ==
15 June 1969
20:00 CET

Atlético Bilbao	1–0	Elche
Arieta 82'	Report

Santiago Bernabéu Stadium, Madrid
Attendance: 120,000
Referee: Antonio Camacho

Atlético Bilbao

Elche

GK	1	(Spain) José Ángel Iribar
DF	2	(Spain) Iñaki Sáez
DF	3	(Spain) Luis María Echeberría (c)
DF	4	(Spain) Jesús Aranguren
MF	5	(Spain) José María Igartua
MF	6	(Spain) José Larrauri
FW	7	(Spain) José Argoitia
FW	8	(Spain) Fidel Uriarte
FW	9	(Spain) Antón Arieta
FW	10	(Spain) Javier Clemente
FW	11	(Spain) Txetxu Rojo
Manager:
(Spain) Rafael Iriondo

GK	1	(Spain) José Araquistáin
DF	2	(Spain) Francisco Ballester
DF	3	(Spain) Vicente Iborra (c)
DF	4	(Paraguay) Ricardo González
MF	5	(Paraguay) Juan Carlos Lezcano
MF	6	(Spain) Tomeu Llompart
MF	7	(Spain) Juan Manuel Asensi
FW	8	(Spain) Curro
FW	9	(Spain) Vavá II
FW	10	(Spain) Fernando Serena
FW	11	(Paraguay) Juan Casco
Manager:
(Uruguay) Roque Máspoli
