= Juan Carlos Lezcano =

Paraguayan footballer (1938–2025)

Personal information
- Full name: Juan Carlos Lezcano López
- Date of birth: 5 November 1938
- Place of birth: Asunción, Paraguay
- Date of death: 12 November 2025 (aged 87)
- Positions: Forward; midfielder

Senior career*
Years	Team	Apps	(Gls)
1958–1960	Universidad Católica		
1959	→ Trasandino (loan)		
1961	Santiago Morning		
1962–1971	Elche	213	(42)
1971–1972	Eldense	24	(1)
1973–1974	Villena		
1974–1975	Crevillente		

Managerial career
- 1978: Elche (interim)
- 1979: Elche (interim)
- 1989: Elche (interim)
- 1995: Elche (interim)
- * Club domestic league appearances and goals

Juan Carlos Lezcano López (5 November 1938 – 12 November 2025) was a Paraguayan footballer who played as a forward and later as a midfielder, primarily in Spain, where he is considered one of Elche CF's most important players.

== Career ==
Born in Asunción to a father who was a footballer, Lezcano began playing football as a youth with local side Club Olimpia. He first played senior football with Chilean side Club Deportivo Universidad Católica. Despite being scouted by Spanish agents, he joined Universidad Católica's rivals Santiago Morning in 1961. The following season, Lezcano moved to Spain, joining Elche CF.

Lezcano played nine La Liga seasons with Elche, scoring 42 goals in 213 league appearances. He was a key figure for the club as it reached the 1969 Copa del Generalísimo Final—Elche's highest profile moment.

After he retired from playing, Lezcano became a football coach. He managed Elche CF Ilicitano in 1976 and was assistant manager to Felipe Mesones for the parent club in 1977. Lezcano also acted as a caretaker manager for Elche on three occasions.

== Death ==
Lezcano died on 12 November 2025, at the age of 87.
