= List of RCD Mallorca managers =

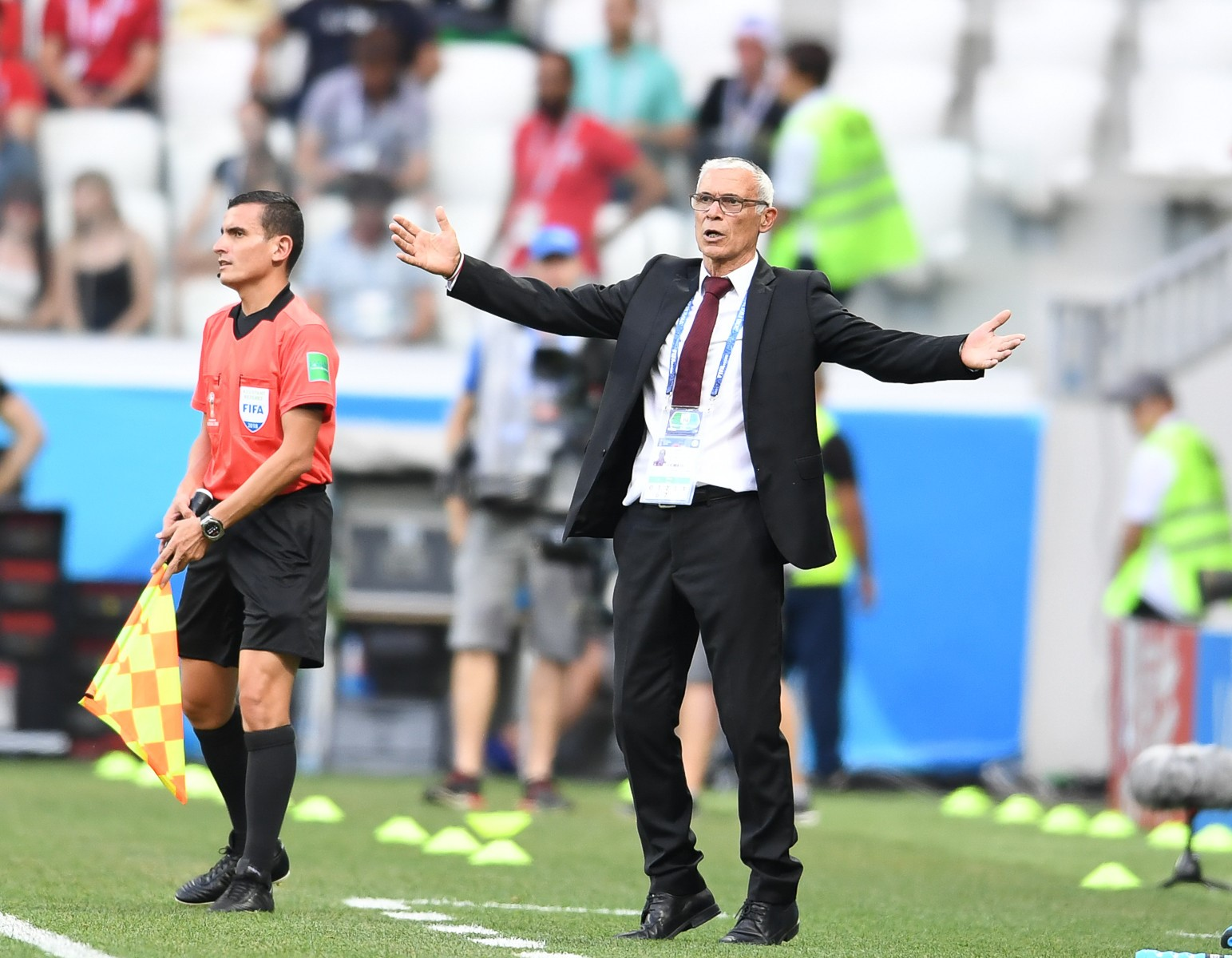
Héctor Cúper, often considered the greatest Mallorca manager ever.

Real Club Deportivo Mallorca is a professional football club based in Palma on the island of Mallorca, Spain, which plays in the top tier of Spanish football, La Liga.

Héctor Cúper is the most successful manager in terms of achievements. Winning the 1998 Supercopa de España after finishing Runner-up in the 1997–98 Copa del Rey to Barcelona and taking the team to the UEFA Cup Winners' Cup final a year later, which they lost to Lazio. Cúper also achieved a best-ever third place finish in the 1998–99 season, which would ony be repeated by Luis Aragonés during the 2000–01 campaign.

== List of managers ==
Name	From	To	Honours	No. of honours	Refs
(Czechoslovakia) Ferry Proks	1923	1924			
(Spain) Victoriano Ferrá	1924	1927			
(Spain) Llauger	1927	1927			
(Spain) Antoni Socias	1927	1930			
(England) Jack Greenwell	1930	1931			
(Spain) Paco Tomás	1931	1932			
(Spain) Antoni Socias	1932	1935			
(Spain) Alzamora	1935	1936			
(Spain) Guzmán	1936	1938			
Vacant (Civil War)	1938	1939			
(Spain) Francisco Pagaza	1939	1940			
(Spain) Alzamora	1940	1941			
(Spain) Prat	1941	1943			
(Spain) Cristòfol Martí	1943	1944			
(Spain) Castro	1944	1945			
(Spain) Patricio Caicedo	1945	1947			
(Spain) Cristòfol Martí	1947	1948			
(Spain) Balaguer	1948	1948			
(Spain) Teodoro Mauri	1948	1949			
(Spain) Patricio Caicedo	1949	1950			
(Spain) Satur Grech	1950	1950			
(Spain) Rotger	1954	1954			
(Spain) Pau Vidal	1954	1955			
(Hungary) Esteban Platko	1955	1956			
(Spain) Andreu Quetglas	1956	1957			
(Spain) Miguel Gual	1957	1958			
(Argentina) Juan Carlos Lorenzo	July 1958	December 1960			
(Spain) José Luis Saso	December 1960	June 1961			
(Spain) Satur Grech	July 1961	January 1962			
(Spain) Jaume Turró	January 1962	January 1962			
(Spain) José Luis Saso	January 1962	June 1963			
(Spain) Arturo Llopis	July 1963	June 1964			
(Spain) Juan Ramón Santiago	July 1964	January 1965			
(Spain) César Rodríguez	January 1965	December 1965			
(Spain) Andreu Quetglas	January 1965	January 1965			
(Uruguay) Héctor Rial	January 1965	June 1966			
(Spain) Joseíto	July 1966	June 1967			
(Spain) Vicente Dauder	July 1967	February 1968			
(Argentina) Juan Carlos Lorenzo	February 1968	March 1968			
(Spain) Jaume Turró	March 1968	June 1968			
(Spain) Vicenç Sassot	July 1969	February 1969			
(Argentina) Juan Carlos Forneris	February 1969	February 1969			
(Uruguay) Sergio Rodríguez	February 1969	November 1969			
(Argentina) Juan Carlos Forneris	November 1969	November 1969			
(Spain) Sabino Barinaga	November 1969	June 1970			
(Spain) José Luis Saso	July 1970	November 1970			
(Argentina) Juan Carlos Forneris	November 1970	October 1971			
(Brazil) Otto Bumbel	October 1970	March 1972			
(Spain) José Luís Saso	March 1972	January 1973			
(Argentina) Juan Carlos Forneris	January 1973	June 1973			
(Spain) Manolín	July 1973	September 1973			
(Spain) César Rodríguez	September 1973	January 1975			
(Spain) Hugo Villamide	January 1975	March 1975			
(Spain) Manuel de la Torre	March 1975	April 1975			
(Spain) Alfredo Vera	April 1975	June 1975			
(Spain) Luís Costa	July 1976	June 1977			
(Spain) Sánchez Alexanco	July 1977	January 1978			
(Argentina) Juan Carlos Forneris	January 1978	January 1979			
(Spain) Enrique Agustí	January 1979	March 1979			
(Spain) Andreu Quetglas	March 1979	June 1979			
(Spain) Antonio Oviedo	July 1979	December 1981			
(France) Lucien Muller	December 1981	June 1983			
(Spain) Koldo Aguirre	July 1983	November 1983			
(France) Marcel Domingo	November 1983	June 1984			
(Spain) Manolo Villanova	July 1984	June 1985			
(Spain) Benito Joanet Giménez	July 1985	October 1985			
(Spain) Lorenzo Serra Ferrer	October 1985	February 1988			
(France) Lucien Muller	February 1988	June 1988			
(Socialist Federal Republic of Yugoslavia) Ivan Brzić	July 1988	December 1988			
(Spain) Lorenzo Serra Ferrer	January 1989	June 1993			
(Spain) Jaume Bauzá	June 1993	November 1994			
(Spain) Fernando Pons	November 1994	April 1995			
(Spain) José Antonio	April 1995	October 1995			
(Spain) Mané	October 1995	January 1996			
(Spain) Víctor Muñoz	January 1996	April 1997			
(Spain) Tomeu Llompart	April 1997	June 1997			
(Argentina) Héctor Cúper	July 1997	June 1999	1 Supercopa de España	1	
(Argentina) Mario Gómez (footballer, born 1957)	July 1999	November 1999			
(Spain) Fernando Vázquez	November 1999	June 2000			
(Spain) Juan Ramón	June 2000	July 2000			
(Spain) Luis Aragonés	July 2000	June 2001			
(Germany) Bernd Krauss	July 2001	October 2001			
(Croatia) Sergije Krešić	October 2001	April 2002			
(Spain) Tomeu Llompart	April 2002	June 2002			
(Spain) Gregorio Manzano	July 2002	June 2003	1 Copa del Rey	1	
(Portugal) Jaime Pacheco	July 2003	September 2003			
(Spain) Tomeu Llompart	October 2003	October 2003			
(Spain) Luis Aragonés	October 2003	June 2004			
(Spain) Benito Floro	July 2004	October 2004			
(Spain) Tomeu Llompart	October 2004	October 2004			
(Argentina) Héctor Cúper	November 2004	February 2006			
(Spain) Gregorio Manzano	February 2006	June 2010			
(Denmark) Michael Laudrup	July 2010	September 2011			
(Spain) Miguel Ángel	September 2011	October 2011			
(Spain) Joaquín Caparrós	October 2011	February 2013			
(Spain) Gregorio Manzano	February 2013	June 2013			
(Spain) José Luis	June 2013	February 2014			
(Spain) Lluís Carreras	February 2014	May 2014			
(Spain) Javier Olaizola	May 2014	July 2014			
(Spain) Miquel Soler	July 2014	August 2014			
(Russia) Valeri Karpin	August 2014	February 2015			
(Spain) Miquel Soler	February 2015	December 2015			
(Spain) Albert Ferrer	June 2015	December 2015			
(Spain) José Gálvez	December 2015	January 2016			
(Spain) Fernando Vázquez	January 2016	June 2017			
(Spain) Vicente Moreno	June 2017	August 2020			
(Spain) Luis García	August 2020	March 2022			
(Mexico) Javier Aguirre	March 2022	June 2024			
(Spain) Jagoba Arrasate	June 2024	February 2026			
(Argentina) Martín Demichelis	February 2026	22 June 2026			
(Spain) Luis García	22 June 2026	Present			
