= Korsunsky =

Korsunsky is a surname. Notable people with this surname include:

- Alexander M. Korsunsky (fl. 2017), British materials scientist
- Sergiy Korsunsky (born 1962), Ukrainian diplomat
