= International Journal of Structural Integrity =

Bi-monthly scientific journal

- Discipline: Structural Integrity
- Language: English
- Edited by: José A.F.O. Correia & Shun-Peng Zhu

Publication details
- History: 2010-present
- Publisher: Emerald Publishing
- Frequency: Bi-monthly
- Open access: Hybrid

Standard abbreviations
- ISO 4: Int. J. Struct. Integr.

Indexing
- ISSN: 1757-9864
- OCLC no.: 654344287

Links
- Journal homepage

The International Journal of Structural Integrity is a bi-monthly peer-reviewed academic journal covering research on damage tolerance design, structural integrity and failure. It was established in 2010 and is published by Emerald Publishing. The editors-in-chief are José A.F.O. Correia (University of Porto) and Shun-Peng Zhu (University of Electronic Science and Technology of China).

== Abstracting and indexing ==
The journal is abstracted and indexed in:

- British Library
- EBSCO
- EI Compendex
- Emerging Sources Citation Index
- QUALIS
- ReadCube Discover
- Norwegian Register for Scientific Journals
- Scopus
