= Francisco Ballester =

Spanish footballer (1946–1977)

Personal information
- Full name: Francisco Ballester Enguix
- Date of birth: 16 September 1946
- Place of birth: Xàtiva, Spain
- Date of death: 5 February 1977 (aged 30)
- Place of death: Xàtiva, Spain
- Position: Right-back

Youth career
- Olímpico Játiva

Senior career*
Years	Team	Apps	(Gls)
- Olímpico Játiva
1965–1967	Elche Ilicitano		
1967–1970	Elche	82	(1)
1970–1974	Real Madrid	0	(0)
1972–1974	Plus Ultra		
1974	→ Onteniente (loan)		
1974–1975	Olímpico Játiva		
Total		82+	(1+)

International career
1969	Spain	1	(0)
- * Club domestic league appearances and goals

Francisco Ballester Enguix (16 September 1946 – 5 February 1977) was a Spanish footballer who played as a right-back.

He made 105 total appearances for Elche, including defeat in the 1969 Copa del Generalísimo final, and played once for Spain in the same year. In 1970, he joined Real Madrid for a fee of 5 million Spanish pesetas.

Ballester was injured after two games and 100 minutes of play for Real Madrid, and never played for the team again, leaving in 1974. He retired due to a seminoma diagnosis in 1975 and died three years later, aged 30.

== Club career ==
Born in Xàtiva in the Valencian Community, Ballester played for hometown club Olímpico de Játiva, whom he helped to promotion to the Tercera División. He then signed for Elche, and after two years in the reserve team Ilicitano, he made his professional debut in La Liga on 5 February 1967 in a 3–0 loss away to Barcelona.

Ballester became a regular player for Elche in the following seasons, and on 15 June 1969 he played in the Copa del Generalísimo final, losing 1–0 to Atlético Bilbao. Ten days later he earned his only cap for Spain, playing the last 16 minutes of a 2–0 loss away to Finland as a substitute for Amancio, in 1970 FIFA World Cup qualification.

On 18 January 1970, Ballester scored his only goal, heading an equaliser in a 1–1 draw away to Pontevedra. He transferred to Real Madrid on a three-year deal for a fee of 5 million Spanish pesetas, having not been aware of the deal beforehand. He joined after the league season and before the end-of-season Copa del Generalísimo, and made his debut on 10 May in a 3–0 home win over Castellón in the last 16, second leg. A week later in the next game, away to Las Palmas, he suffered a meniscus break after ten minutes.

Ballester missed two whole seasons before being assigned to the newly formed reserve team Plus Ultra. He barely played for the third-tier side, as future international player Ángel Lanchas was performing well in the same position.

Ballester joined Onteniente in the third division on loan in 1974. Due to his physical limitations, he was moved to a central position in defence of midfield, relying on his experience. With his contract expired, the 27-year-old then returned to his hometown club for his final season. After being struck during a match, he suffered stomach issues and went to the doctor, where he was diagnosed with seminoma.

== Illness and death ==
Ballester left football and became a physical education teacher after his diagnosis. On 5 February 1977, he died at age 30. He and his wife had a five-year-old daughter, who grew up to be a surgeon.
