= Julio Orozco =

Spanish association football player

Personal information
- Full name: Julio Orozco Martín
- Date of birth: 14 May 1948 (age 78)
- Place of birth: Yuncler, Spain
- Height: 1.80 m (5 ft 11 in)
- Position: Forward

Senior career*
Years	Team	Apps	(Gls)
1969–1973	Atlético Madrid	51	(19)
1973–1980	Málaga	176	(48)
Total		227	(67)
- * Club domestic league appearances and goals

Julio Orozco Martín (born 14 May 1948) is a Spanish former footballer who played as a forward.

He made 140 La Liga appearances and scored 33 goals for Atlético Madrid and Málaga, winning two league titles and the Copa del Generalísimo with the former. In 1980, he was banned for two years for a match-fixing scandal.

== Career ==
=== Atlético Madrid ===
Born in Yuncler in the Province of Toledo, Orozco was one of a number of players from his province to make it into the Atlético Madrid first team in the 1960s and 1970s. He made his debut in La Liga on 21 September 1969 in the second game of the season, playing the last five minutes of a 2–1 home loss to Las Palmas as a substitute for Javier Irureta. A week later on his first start, he scored in a 2–0 home win over Valencia, eventually making four appearances in a title-winning season.

In 1971–72, Orozco scored a career-best 10 top-flight goals, including four on 5 December in a 5–0 win over Real Sociedad at the Vicente Calderón Stadium; only Luis Aragonés in 1967 had scored four in a game for the team before. He finished the season on 8 July with the 1972 Copa del Generalísimo final, playing the last 19 minutes in place of injured goalscorer José Eulogio Gárate in a 2–1 victory over Valencia.

=== Málaga ===
In July 1973, former Atlético manager Marcel Domingo signed Orozco amidst interest from Barcelona. The player received a three-year contract with a combined salary of 7 million Spanish pesetas and his former club received 8 million.

On 27 April 1980, with Málaga already relegated by the 31st matchday, the team were to take on relegation-threatened Salamanca. The visiting club's manager Felipe Mesones enlisted his former player Raúl Castronovo of Algeciras – a former Málaga teammate of Orozco – to present the offer of 4.4 million pesetas for Málaga to lose. Salamanca's 3–0 win is the only game in La Liga history to have been voided for match-fixing, though that club still avoided relegation. Orozco was one of five Málaga players suspended over the fix, being banned from football for two years.
