= Canteli =

Canteli is a surname. Notable people with the surname include:

- Alfonso Fernández-Canteli (born 1945), Spanish academic
- Alfredo Canteli (born 1946), Spanish politician
