= Albert Niculăesei =

Romanian footballer (born 2008)

Personal information
- Full name: Albert Constantin Niculăesei Plesca
- Date of birth: 26 March 2008 (age 18)
- Place of birth: Elche, Spain
- Height: 1.86 m (6 ft 1 in)
- Position: Left-back

Team information
- Current team: Elche B
- Number: 35

Youth career
- 2013–: Elche

Senior career*
Years	Team	Apps	(Gls)
2024–	Elche B	1	(0)
2024–	Elche	1	(0)

International career^{‡}
2024–	Romania U17	5	(0)
- * Club domestic league appearances and goals as of 24 January 2025 ‡ National team caps and goals as of 19 November 2024

Albert Constantin Niculăesei Plesca (born 26 March 2008) is a professional footballer who plays for Elche CF Ilicitano. Mainly a left-back, he can also play as a centre-back. Born in Spain, he represents Romania internationally.

== Club career ==
Born in Elche, Alicante, Valencian Community, Niculăesei joined Elche CF's youth sides in 2013, aged five. On 7 June 2024, he renewed his contract with the club.

Niculăesei made his senior debut with the reserves on 27 October 2024, starting in a 1–1 Segunda Federación away draw against UE Cornellà. He made his first team debut three days later, starting in a 3–0 away win over CD Coria, for the season's Copa del Rey.

Niculăesei made his Segunda División debut on 24 January 2025, coming on as a late substitute for Yago Santiago in a 2–0 home win over SD Eibar.

== International career ==
Niculăesei represented Romania at under-17 level.
