= Titilayo =

- Gender: Female
- Language: Yoruba

Origin
- Origin: Nigeria
- Meaning: Joy lasts forever
- Region of origin: South-west Nigeria

TitilayoTitilayo.ogg is a female Yoruba name meaning "Joy lasts forever". Related names include Títílọlá "Nobility never fades", Títílayọ̀mi "My happiness/joy is forever", Títíladùnayọ̀ "Forever is the sweetness of joy".

== Notable people with the name ==
- Titilayo Rachel Adedokun (born 1973), American singer and beauty pageant titleholder
- Amina Titilayo (6 June 1951), Nigerian advocate of women and child rights and the wife of former vice president of the Federal Republic of Nigeria, Atiku Abubakar
- Titilayo Laoye-Tomori (born 21 December 1948), Nigerian politician, she served as deputy governor of Osun State and commissioner for education from 2010 to 2018
- Esther Titilayo Akinlabi, Nigerian-South African Professor of Mechanical Engineering
- Titilayo Fatima Azeez (born 31 December 1992), Nigerian badminton player
