= European Structural Integrity Society =

Engineering scientific society

- Abbreviation: ESIS
- Founded: November 1978; 48 years ago
- Type: Engineering society
- Purpose: The purpose of the scientific society is to create and expand knowledge about all aspects of structural integrity and the dissemination of that knowledge.
- Location: European Union
- Region served: Worldwide
- Method: Technical standards, conferences, publications
- Official language: English
- President: Aleksandar Sedmak
- Website: structuralintegrity.eu

The European Society for Structural Integrity (ESIS) is an international non-profit engineering scientific society. Its purpose is to create and expand knowledge about all aspects of structural integrity and the dissemination of that knowledge. The goal is to improve the safety and performance of structures and components.

== History ==
The purpose of European Structural Integrity Society dates back to November 1978 during the summer school in Darmstadt (Germany). At the time, the name was European Group on Fracture. Between 1979 and 1988 the first technical committees were created, the first technical committee had the designation of Elasto-Plastic Fracture Mechanics. The initial idea was to reproduce in Europe the same as the ASTM committee. The first president of European Structural Integrity Society was Dr. L.H. Larsson (European Commission Joint Research Centre). ESIS has a total of 24 technical committees and national groups in each European country.

The current president of ESIS is Prof. Aleksandar Sedmak from the University of Belgrade (Serbia).

== Scientific Journals ==
ESIS is institutionally responsible for the following scientific journals:

- Engineering Failure Analysis
- Engineering Fracture Mechanics
- International Journal of Fatigue
- Theoretical and Applied Fracture Mechanics
- Procedia Structural Integrity

== Organization of International Conferences ==
ESIS is the organizer or supporter of various international conference series:

- ECF, European Conference on Fracture (biennial)
- ICSI, International Conference on Structural Integrity (biennial)
- IRAS, International Conference on Risk Analysis and Safety of Complex Structures and Componentes (biennial)

== Awards ==
ESIS, at its events, confers the following awards:

- The Griffith Medal
- The August-Wöhler Medal
- The Award of Merit
- Honorary Membership
- The Young Scientist Award
- Robert Moskovic Award (ESIS TC12)

== The August Wöhler Medal Winners ==
- 2022: Youshi Hong, Chinese Academy of Sciences, China
- 2020: Filippo Berto, Sapienza University of Rome, Italy
- 2016: Paul C. Paris, Washington University in St. Louis, USA
- 2014: Reinhard Pippan, Austrian Academy of Sciences, Austria
- 2010: Ashok Saxena, University of Arkansas, USA
- 2008: Morris Sonsino, Technische Universität Darmstadt, Germany
- 2006: Robert O. Ritchie, University of California, Berkeley, USA
- 2004: Leslie Pook, University College London, UK
- 2002: Michael W. Brown, The University of Sheffield, UK
- 2000: Darrell F. Socie, University of Illinois, USA

== The Award of Merit Winners ==
- 2022: José A.F.O. Correia, University of Porto, Portugal
- 2020: Uwe Zerbst, Federal Institute for Materials Research and Testing, Germany
- 2018: Filippo Berto, Sapienza University of Rome, Italy
- 2016: Laszlo Toth, University of Miskolc, Hungary
- 2014: Wolfgang Dietzel, Helmholtz-Zentrum Hereon, Germany
- 2010: Jaroslav Pokluda, Brno University of Technology, Czech Republic
- 2008: Emmanuel Gdoutos, Democritus University of Thrace, Greece
- 2006: Andrzej Neimitz, Kielce University of Technology, Poland
- 2004: Keith Miller, University of Sheffield, UK
- 2002: Dietrich Munz, Karlsruhe Institute of Technology, Germany
- 2000: Ian Milne, Integrity Management Services, UK

== The Robert Moskovic Award Winners ==
- 2023: Aleksandar Grbovic, University of Belgrade, Serbia; Marc A. Meyers, University of California, San Diego, USA; Motomichi Koyama, Tohoku University, Japan
- 2022: Hryhoriy Nykyforchyn, National Academy of Sciences of Ukraine, Ukraine; John Michopoulos, United States Naval Research Laboratory, USA; Grzegorz Lesiuk, Wrocław University of Science and Technology, Poland
- 2021: Maria Feng, Columbia University, USA; Filippo Berto, Norwegian University of Science and Technology, Norway; Milan Veljkovic, Delft University of Technology, Netherlands
- 2020: Neil James, Plymouth University, UK; Rui Calçada, University of Porto, Portugal; Vladimir Moskvichev, Russian Academy of Sciences, Russia
- 2019: Hojjat Adeli, Ohio State University, USA; Alfonso Fernández-Canteli, University of Oviedo, Spain; Aleksandar Sedmak, University of Belgrade, Serbia
