= Korsunsky Work-of-Indentation Approach =

The Korsunsky work-of-indentation approach is a method of extracting values of hardness and stiffness for a small volume of material from indentation test data, first developed by Alexander M. Korsunsky.

== Method ==
Instead of relying on measurements or assumptions pertaining to the observed area of contact between indenter and sample, the method uses the load-displacement data registered in the Continuously Recorded Indentation Testing (CRIT) that is widely applied in nanoindentation experiments. In particular, the Korsunsky method re-defines hardness and expresses it in terms of the energy (work) associated with indenting the surface of a material by the probe. The work-of-indentation used in the analysis may refer to the total, elastic or dissipated energy, depending on the formulation. The approach can be used in the analysis of thin coatings, nano-multi-layers, nanoscale features.

The original application of the approach was developed for the problem of finding the composite hardness of a coated system. The composite hardness is known to vary depending on the applied load and or indentation depth. In the Korsunsky work-of-indentation approach, the composite hardness is given by a simple expression (the “knee function”) of the relative indentation depth (the indentation depth normalized with respect to the coating thickness), and the substrate and coating hardness. The function contains a single fitting parameter, which describes a wide range of composite and indenter properties such as coating brittleness, interfacial strength, indenter geometry, etc. This model of hardness determination has been verified by numerous researchers investigating different coated systems.

== Developments ==
This approach has undergone numerous modifications since its inception. Most recently, Jha et al. found that the Korsunsky work-of-indentation approach measures the nominal hardness of a material which is defined as the maximum load divided by the area of maximum contact. The nominal hardness of a material is different than its true hardness (determined by the Oliver-Pharr method), but the two concepts are interrelated. Jha et al derived an expression that determines the true hardness of a material from its nominal counterpart. In doing so, they employed a dimensionless energy-based parameter that relates the contact depth to the maximum depth of penetration. For a soft material, the difference between the contact depth and the maximum depth of penetration is small, and hence its nominal and true hardness values are practically the same. For a harder material these two types of hardness are different as the difference between them is large. The model proposed by Jha et al in its current form is applicable when the indenter is ideally sharp or when the maximum depth of penetration is sufficiently large compared to the indenter tip radius. The advantage of the modified work-of-indentation is that it does not require the computation of contact area, which is the main limitation of the conventional Oliver-Pharr method. The approach requires further modification in order to incorporate effect of bluntness at the tip of an indenter on the measured hardness of a material.
