= Oltra =

Oltra is a surname. Notable people with the surname include:

- José Luis Oltra (born 1969), Spanish footballer
- Manuel Oltra (1922–2015), Spanish composer
- María Oltra (born 1963), Spanish politician
- Mònica Oltra (born 1969), Spanish politician
- Silvio Oltra (1958–1995), Argentine racing driver
