= Hojjat Adeli =

American electrical engineer

- photo of Hojjat Adeli
- Born: 3 June 1950; Langarud, Iran
- Education: University of Tehran; Stanford University
- Scientific career
- Workplaces: Ohio State University

Hojjat Adeli (Persian: حجت عادلی) from Ohio State University, Columbus, OH was named Fellow of the Institute of Electrical and Electronics Engineers (IEEE) in 2012 for contributions to computational intelligence in infrastructure engineering and also an Elected Fellow of the American Association for the Advancement of Science. In 2019, Hojjat Adeli was distinguished with the Robert Moskovic Award in recognition of an outstanding contribution to Computational Intelligence and Smart Structures given by the ESIS TC12 technical committee of the European Structural Integrity Society.

== Early life and education ==
Hojjat Adeli received his bachelor's and master's degrees in civil engineering from the University of Tehran (UT), Iran. In 1973, he ranked first among all graduates of the College of Engineering and was awarded the Medal of Education at a formal graduation ceremony.

He earned his Ph.D. in civil engineering from Stanford University in June 1976, completing the doctoral program in approximately 30 months after enrolling. At the time of his admission to Stanford, he was registered under the name Hojjatollah Adeli Rankouhi; following the completion of his doctorate, he adopted the shortened professional name Hojjat Adeli.

After receiving his Ph.D., Adeli conducted postdoctoral research at Stanford University as a research associate in applied mechanics, with a focus on fracture dynamics. Although his academic training had primarily been in structural engineering, this appointment marked an expansion of his research into engineering mechanics.

== Career ==
=== Early academic career ===
After completing his doctoral studies in 1976, Adeli continued at Stanford University as a postdoctoral research associate before accepting a faculty position at Northwestern University. In 1978, he returned to Iran and joined the University of Tehran as a faculty member in civil engineering.

During the late 1970s and early 1980s, a period marked by political upheaval and institutional disruption in Iran, Adeli relocated to the United States, where he resumed his academic career.

=== Ohio State University ===
In June 1983, Adeli joined the Ohio State University as an associate professor of engineering. He was promoted to full professor five years later and subsequently served as chair of the structures faculty.

At Ohio State, Adeli holds a primary appointment as professor of civil and environmental engineering and geodetic science and is the holder of the Abba G. Lichtenstein Professorship. He has also held joint or affiliated appointments in aerospace engineering, biomedical engineering, biomedical informatics, electrical and computer engineering, neurological surgery, and neuroscience.

== Research ==
Adeli's research focuses on computational intelligence and its applications to engineering problems. According to his biographical profile published by the American Society of Civil Engineers, his work spans a wide range of areas, including structural engineering, smart structures, optimization, high-performance computing, machine learning, and intelligent infrastructure.

His research emphasizes the integration of neural networks, evolutionary algorithms, wavelets, and related computational techniques into engineering analysis and design, with applications across multiple engineering disciplines. He has authored a substantial body of scholarly work, including journal articles and books published across engineering, computer science, applied mathematics, and biomedical fields. His research has appeared in numerous peer-reviewed journals, and he has played an active role in scholarly publishing as the founding editor-in-chief of academic journals such as Computer-Aided Civil and Infrastructure Engineering (founded in 1986) and Integrated Computer-Aided Engineering (founded in 1993).He has also served on editorial boards of American Society of Civil Engineers (ASCE) technical committees, including the ASCE Aerospace Engineering Division Editorial Board.

In collaboration with doctoral students and research associates, Adeli has applied computational methods to biomedical problems, including the development of automated techniques for seizure detection and the diagnosis of neurological disorders such as epilepsy and attention deficit hyperactivity disorder. This line of research has also been extended to the early-stage diagnosis of neurodegenerative diseases, including Alzheimer's disease.

In addition to his research activities, Adeli has taught courses in structural and bridge engineering, emphasizing both technical analysis and design principles. His teaching incorporates examples of innovative and architecturally distinctive bridges as part of engineering education.

== Publications ==
=== Authored Books ===
The following books have been authored or co-authored by Hojjat Adeli:

- Parallel Processing in Structural Engineering (1993).
- Machine Learning: Neural Networks, Genetic Algorithms, and Fuzzy Systems (1995).
- Interactive Microcomputer-Aided Structural Steel Design (1988).
- Expert Systems for Structural Design - A New Generation (1988).
- Neurocomputing for Design Automation (1998).
- Control, Optimization, and Smart Structures (1999).
- Distributed Computer-Aided Engineering for Analysis, Design, and Visualization (1999).
- High-Performance Computing in Structural Engineering (1999).
- Construction Scheduling, Cost Optimization, and Management – A New Model Based on Neurocomputing and Object Technologies (2001).
- Wavelets in Intelligent Transportation Systems (2005).
- Cost Optimization of Structures – Fuzzy Logic, Genetic Algorithms, and Parallel Computing (2006).
- Intelligent Infrastructure – Neural Networks, Wavelets, and Chaos Theory for Intelligent Transportation Systems and Smart Structures (2009).
- Wavelet-Based Vibration Control of Smart Buildings and Bridges (2009).
- Automated EEG-Based Diagnosis of Neurological Disorders (2010).
- Computational Intelligence - Synergies of Fuzzy Logic, Neural Networks and Evolutionary Computing (2013).
- Nature-Inspired computing – Physics- and Chemistry-based Algorithms (2017).

=== Edited Books ===
The following books have been edited or co-edited by Hojjat Adeli:

- Expert Systems in Construction and Structural Engineering (1988).
- Parallel and Distributed Processing in Structural Engineering (1988).
- Microcomputer Knowledge-Based Expert Systems in Civil Engineering (1988).
- Knowledge Engineering – Volume One – Fundamentals (1990).
- Knowledge Engineering – Volume Two – Applications (1990).
- Mechanics Computing in 1990's and Beyond – Volume One – Computational Mechanics, Fluid Mechanics, and Biomechanics (1991).
- Supercomputing in Engineering Analysis (1992).
- Advances in Design Optimization (1994).
- Computing and Information Technology for Architecture, Engineering, and Construction (1996).
- Intelligent Information Systems (1997).
- Historic Bridges: Evaluation, Preservation, and Management (2008).
- Advances in Computer Science and Information Technology (2010).

== Honors and awards ==
Adeli's contributions to engineering and computational intelligence have been recognized through a number of professional honors and distinctions.

=== Lifetime achievement and top honors ===
Adeli has received several major lifetime and career-level honors in recognition of his contributions to engineering research and education. These include the Timoshenko Award for Outstanding Lifetime Achievement in Mechanics of Solids from the National Academy of Sciences of Ukraine. He is also a recipient of the inaugural Archimedes Medal from the International Olympiad Committee in Engineering Science, Greece. His international standing is further reflected in his election as a Full Member of the Norwegian Academy of Technological Sciences.

=== Research impact and Highly Cited Researcher ===
Adeli's research impact has been documented through repeated recognition by Clarivate Analytics (Web of Science Group). He has been named a Highly Cited Researcher multiple times, an honor awarded to researchers whose publications rank in the top 1% by citations for field and year. He received this distinction in 2014 (Engineering), 2015 (Engineering and Computer Science), 2016 (Engineering and Computer Science), 2017 (Engineering), 2018 (Engineering), 2019 (Cross-Field), 2020 (Cross-Field), 2024 (Engineering), 2025 (Engineering), and 2026 (Cross-Field).

In addition, his work was recognized through inclusion in Thomson Reuters' lists of the World's Most Influential Scientific Minds in 2014 and 2015.

=== Major professional society awards and honors ===
Adeli has received several honors from professional engineering and scientific societies, including:

- The Construction Management Award from the American Society of Civil Engineers (ASCE).
- The Outstanding Civil Engineer Award from the ASCE Central Ohio Section.
- The Special Medal for Outstanding Contribution to the Development of Computational Intelligence from the Polish Neural Network Society.
- The Halcrow Prize from the Institution of Civil Engineers (ICE), United Kingdom.
- The Robert Moskovic Award from the European Structural Integrity Society for outstanding contributions to computational intelligence and smart structures.

He has also been elected or named to fellow, honorary, or distinguished member status in several professional organizations, including:

- Fellow of the Institute of Electrical and Electronics Engineers (IEEE), elected in 2012 for contributions to computational intelligence in infrastructure engineering.
- Fellow of the American Association for the Advancement of Science.
- Honorary, later Distinguished, Member of the American Society of Civil Engineers.
- Fellow of the American Neurological Association.
- Fellow of the American Institute for Medical and Biological Engineering (AIMBE).

=== International academy memberships ===
Adeli has been elected as a foreign or corresponding member of several national academies, reflecting the international scope of his academic work. These include:

- Corresponding member of the Spanish Royal Academy of Engineering, elected in 2015.
- Foreign member of the Lithuanian Academy of Sciences, elected in 2017.
- Foreign member of the Polish Academy of Sciences, elected in 2017.
- Member of Academia Europaea, elected in 2018.

=== Eponymous awards ===
Adeli's contributions to academic publishing and research leadership have been recognized through the establishment of awards bearing his name:

The Hojjat Adeli Award for Innovation in Computing, established by Wiley-Blackwell in recognition of his 25-year service as Editor-in-Chief of Computer-Aided Civil and Infrastructure Engineering.

The Hojjat Adeli Award for Outstanding Contributions in Neural Systems, established by World Scientific in recognition of his research contributions.

=== University awards for teaching and research ===
At The Ohio State University, Adeli has received multiple institutional awards recognizing his contributions to research, teaching, and academic leadership. These include the University Distinguished Scholar Award, the Abba G. Lichtenstein Professorship, the Peter L. and Clara M. Scott Award for Excellence in Engineering Education, the Charles E. MacQuigg Outstanding Teaching Award, and the Lichtenstein Memorial Award for faculty excellence.

He has also received several Lumley Research Awardsand the College of Engineering Annual Research Accomplishment Award.

=== Honorary doctorates and international academic appointments ===
Adeli has been awarded honorary doctoral degrees by universities in Europe and Asia in recognition of his contributions to engineering research and education. These institutions include:

- Vilnius Gediminas Technical University, Lithuania.
- Polytechnic University of Madrid, Spain.
- Mediterranean University of Reggio Calabria, Italy.
- Saint Petersburg Electrotechnical University, Russia.
- National University of Public Service, Hungary.
- University of West Attica, Greece.
- Polytechnic University of Cartagena, Spain.
- University of Transport Technology, Hanoi, Vietnam.
- University of Patras, Greece.
- Democritus University of Thrace, Greece.

He has also held Honorary, Distinguished, or Advisory Professor appointments at institutions worldwide, including the University of Paris-Saclay (France), the University of Stirling (United Kingdom), King Abdulaziz University (Saudi Arabia), Tianjin University, Southeast University (China), and the University of São Paulo (Brazil), among others.

=== Other notable honors ===
Adeli's early recognitions include the Alborze Foundation Prize for Distinguished Engineering Graduate of the Year in Iran and the First Degree Medal of Education from the Iranian Ministry of Higher Education. Additional honors include the Distinguished Alumnus Award from the University of Tehran College of Engineering, a Resolution recognizing him as an Outstanding Ohioan by the Ohio Senate.

In April 2010, Adeli was profiled as an Engineering Legend in the journal Leadership and Management in Engineering, published by the American Society of Civil Engineers. The profile was authored by a biographer known for documenting the work of influential engineers such as Leonardo da Vinci, Hardy Cross, George Ferris, Stephen P. Timoshenko, Nathan Newmark, Ralph B. Peck, and Arthur Casagrande.
