= José Antonio Morante =

José Antonio Morante may refer to:

- José Antonio Morante (footballer, born 1944), or Lico, Spanish football manager and former midfielder
- José Antonio Morante (footballer, born 2007), Spanish football winger
