= Delfín Álvarez =

Spanish footballer and manager

Personal information
- Full name: Delfín Álvarez Yáñez
- Date of birth: 14 July 1936
- Place of birth: A Veiga, Spain
- Date of death: 29 August 2015 (aged 79)
- Place of death: Madrid, Spain
- Height: 1.66 m (5 ft 5 in)
- Position: Midfielder

Senior career*
Years	Team	Apps	(Gls)
–1956	Banco Obrero		
1956–1960	Plus Ultra	43	(0)
1960–1962	Granada	41	(2)
1962–1965	Real Murcia	44	(2)
1965–1966	Espanyol	22	(0)
1966–1968	Pontevedra	17	(0)
Total		167	(4)

Managerial career
- 1977–1979: Ourense
- 1980: Badajoz
- 1980–1981: Racing Ferrol
- 1981–1982: Pontevedra
- 1982–1983: Guadalajara
- 1983–1986: Logroñés
- 1986–1987: Elche
- 1987–1988: Racing Santander
- 1989: Alzira
- 1989–1990: Celta
- 1990: Ourense
- 1992–1994: Xerez
- 1995: Atlético Marbella
- 1998: Elche
- 1998–1999: Guadalajara
- 1999–2000: Pontevedra
- 2000–2001: Pontevedra
- * Club domestic league appearances and goals

Delfín Álvarez Yáñez (14 September 1936 – 29 August 2015) was a Spanish football manager and midfielder.

Álvarez amassed 74 matches and only one goal in La Liga, including 91/3 in Segunda División. As a manager, he only reached the top tier while in charge of Celta de Vigo, but spent seven seasons with clubs in the second level.

== Playing career ==
Born in A Veiga, Ourense, Galicia, Álvarez made his senior debut at Venezuelan club Banco Obrero, after moving to the country at the age of 15. In 1956 he moved to Real Madrid, being assigned to farm team AD Plus Ultra; he made his professional debut on 15 September 1957, in a Segunda División 1–3 away loss against Real Betis.

In 1960 Álvarez moved to La Liga side Granada CF, making his debut in the competition on 11 September in a 0–1 loss at Real Sociedad. He scored his first goal as a professional on 23 April 1961, netting his team's second in a 5–1 home routing of Racing de Santander.

After suffering relegation, Álvarez moved to Real Murcia in the second level in 1962, and achieved promotion back to the top tier at first attempt. He left the Murcians in 1965, after suffering another drop.

Shortly after leaving Murcia Álvarez joined RCD Espanyol also in the main category, but left the club in 1966. He subsequently represented Pontevedra CF before retiring at the age of 31, in 1968.

== Managerial career ==
Álvarez started his managerial career with lower clubs in his native region, had a spell at CD Guadalajara, taking the side back to Tercera División at first attempt. He was subsequently appointed at CD Logroñés in 1983, winning promotion to the second level in his first season and nearly repeating the feat in his second.

Álvarez was subsequently appointed in charge of second tier clubs Elche CF, Racing de Santander and UD Alzira in the following campaigns, suffering relegation with the latter. In December 1989 he was named manager of top level club Celta de Vigo, only winning one match out of 12 before being sacked.

After subsequent spells at CD Ourense and Xerez CD, Álvarez was appointed at the helm of CA Marbella in April 1995, only lasting three matches (all defeats). After another short period at Elche (two matches) and a second spell at Guadalajara, he was appointed manager of Pontevedra in October 1999.

After resigning in July 2000, Álvarez returned to the Granotes on 16 October of that year. He resigned in January 2001, and subsequently retired from football due to a recurrent back injury.

== Death ==
On 29 August 2015, Álvarez died due to a long illness, aged 79.
