= Juan Casco =

Paraguayan footballer (born 1945)

Personal information
- Full name: Juan Gualberto Casco Bogarín
- Date of birth: 12 July 1945 (age 81)
- Place of birth: Encarnación, Paraguay
- Position: Midfielder

Senior career*
Years	Team	Apps	(Gls)
1965–1970	Elche CF	74	(14)
1970–1972	Villarreal CF	66	(12)
1973–1975	Real Murcia	39	(8)
1976–1976	Albacete Balompié		

International career
- Paraguay
- * Club domestic league appearances and goals

Juan Gualberto Casco Bogarín (born 12 July 1945) is a Paraguayan retired footballer who played as a midfielder, primarily in Spain.

== Career ==
Casco, who was described by Mundo Deportivo as quick and incisive in his play, spent five seasons in La Liga with Elche, scoring 25 goals in 97 official matches for the club. Casco scored twelve of the goals in the Copa del Rey, making him the club's third-highest scorer in that competition. He scored the deciding goal against Real Sociedad in the 1969 Copa del Generalísimo semi-final playoff, leading the club to the final – its highest profile moment. Casco played in the final, but was unable to prevent Athletic Bilbao from winning 1–0.
