= Raúl Castronovo =

Argentine footballer (1949–2026)

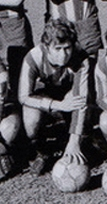
- Castronovo with Rosario Central in 1969

Personal information
- Full name: Raúl Osvaldo Castronovo Zanón
- Date of birth: 11 January 1949
- Place of birth: Rosario, Argentina
- Date of death: 14 May 2026 (aged 77)
- Height: 1.72 m (5 ft 8 in)
- Position: Striker

Senior career*
Years	Team	Apps	(Gls)
1968–1970	Rosario Central	63	(14)
1971	Peñarol	19	(13)
1971–1974	Nancy	79	(30)
1974–1977	Málaga	56	(20)
1977–1978	Hércules	18	(6)
1978–1979	Salamanca	26	(8)
1979–1980	Algeciras	22	(3)
Total		283	(94)
- * Club domestic league appearances and goals

Raúl Osvaldo Castronovo Zanón (11 January 1949 – 14 May 2026) was an Argentine professional footballer who played as a striker.

== Career ==
Born in Rosario, Santa Fe, Castronovo began his career with local Rosario Central in 1968. An economic crisis prompted his move to Peñarol in Uruguay, where he became the top scorer of the 1971 edition of the Copa Libertadores, tied with Luis Artime at ten goals.

After playing in Ligue 1 with Nancy for three seasons, Castronovo moved to Spain where he remained until the end of his career, representing Málaga, Hércules, Salamanca and Algeciras and competing in both La Liga and Segunda División. On 27 April 1980, whilst a free agent, he was involved in a match fixing incident between the first and the third clubs which resulted in a two-year ban for himself, Málaga teammate Julio Orozco and Salamanca manager Felipe Mesones; he retired shortly after, aged 31.

== Death ==
Castronovo died on 14 May 2026, at the age of 77.
