= Manuel Pinto Coelho =

Portuguese physician and author

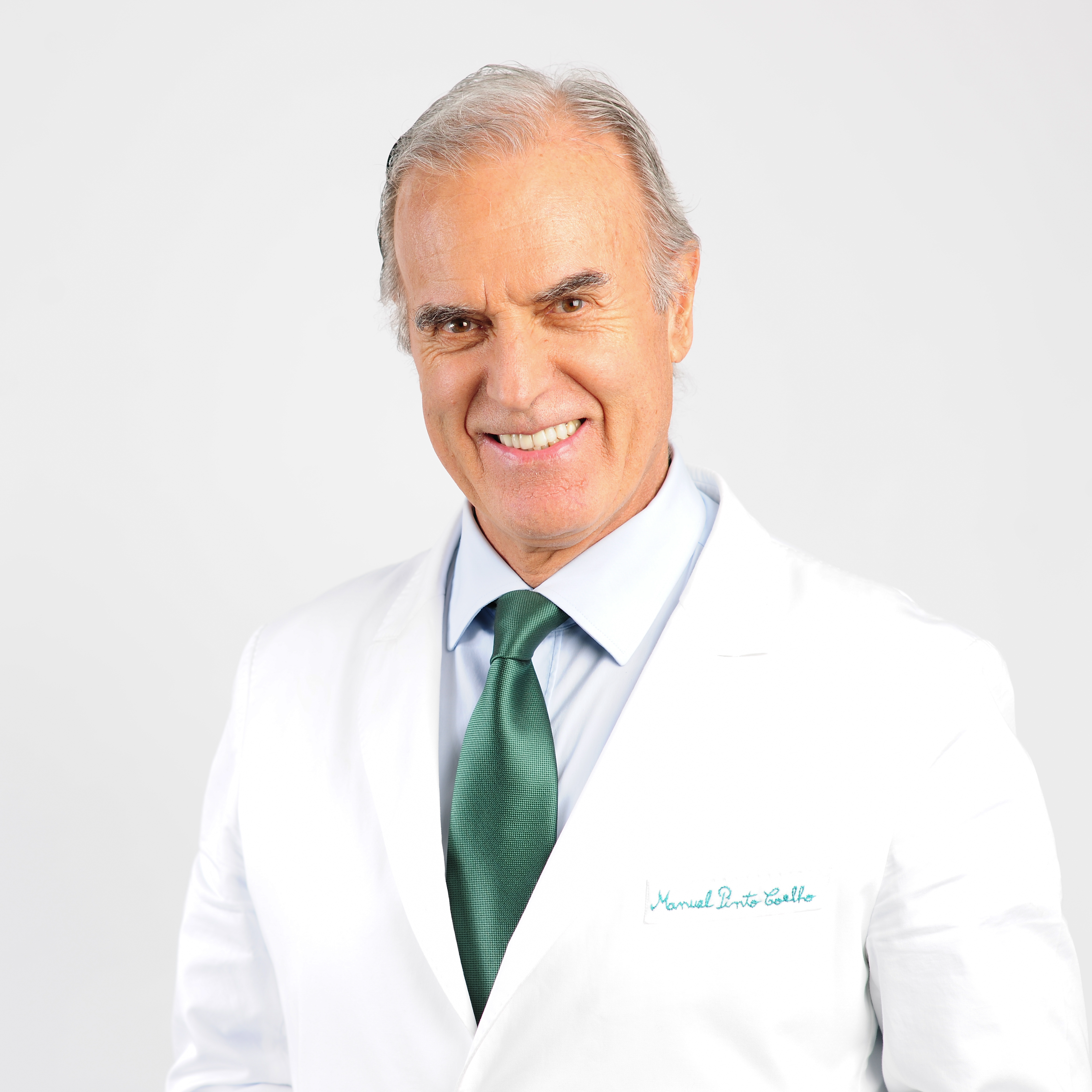
- Portrait of Manuel Pinto Coelho
- Born: Manuel Ferreira Pinto Coelho; 26 July 1948; Mercês, Portugal
- Occupations: Physician, author
- Website: https://www.doutorpintocoelho.pt/

Manuel Ferreira Pinto Coelho (26 July 1948) is a Portuguese physician and author, owner and clinical director of Clínica Doutor Pinto Coelho.

Pinto Coelho is a prominent proponent of complementary medicine and is a critic of evidence-based medicine, referred to in the national press as "the face of the anti-aging movement in Portugal". His controversial ideas are contested by his peers for being based on pseudoscientific theories and opposing the established scientific consensus, which resulted in Pinto Coelho being subject to disciplinary inquiries and public repairs by the Ordem dos Médicos (the Association of Portuguese Physicians).

== Biography ==
Pinto Coelho holds a degree in medicine and surgery from the Faculty of Medicine of the University of Lisbon (1972). In 2011, he obtained a doctoral degree in Pedagogy from the University of Trás-os-Montes and Alto Douro. In 2014, he finished his postgraduate degree in Anti-Aging Medicine at the Autonomous University of Barcelona. Pinto Coelho is director of the Clínica Doutor Pinto Coelho since 2014, and a member of the American Academy of Anti-Aging Medicine (2015) and the World Society of Anti-Aging Medicine (2016).

Pinto Coelho was the head of the medical team of the professional football teams G.D. Estoril Praia, between 1980 and 1981, and Sporting Clube de Portugal, between 1981 and 1982. He was the clinical head of a drug abuse recovery center in Galamares and in Gondomar (1991 to 2003) and a drug abuse consultant at the Lisbon City Council (2002 to 2004). He assumed functions as the personal physician of Pedro Santana Lopes, from July 2004 to February 2005, when Santana Lopes served as prime minister of Portugal. He gave up on the activism of the Portuguese Social Democratic Party after learning that the party was preparing an initiative to open supervised injection sites in Lisbon.

== Controversy ==
Pinto Coelho is a proponent of pseudoscientific practices such as the alkaline diet, the leaky gut syndrome, intermittent fasting to reinforce the immune system, anti-aging therapy using growth hormones. He also has suggested a regular daily intake of seawater, unprotected sun exposure and is against the use of statins to treat hypercholesterolemia.

He has published several books promoting pseudoscience and cites several proponents of alternative medicine such as Joseph Mercola, Lair Ribeiro and Graham Simpson. Some of his most acclaimed books are Chegar Novo a Velho (Get Young to Old Age), Colesterol: Mitos e Realidade (Cholesterol: Myths and Reality) and the new book O Segredo do Sistema Imunitário (The Immune System's Secret)

Pinto Coelho was subjected to three disciplinary procedures by the Ordem dos Médicos. Two disciplinary procedures were initiated in 2017, following statements he made on national television and in an interview with the newspaper Expresso. In response, the Ordem dos Médicos wrote a press release stating that they "strongly disagree with several of the statements made by Dr. Manuel Pinto Coelho, which may constitute an attack on the health of patients and the community". Pinto Coelho's claims were also criticized by António Vaz Carvalho, the director of the Cochrane Portugal, head of the Center for Studies in Evidence-Based Medicine, and President of the Scientific Council of the Evidence-Based Health Institute from the University of Lisbon, where he stated that Pinto Coelho "does a disservice when he ignores scientific evidence supporting clinical decisions, invents explanations that he knows are false, believes in magical facts without any empirical foundation".
