= University of Trás-os-Montes and Alto Douro =

Public university in Vila Real, Portugal

- Portuguese: Universidade de Trás-os-Montes e Alto Douro
- UTAD logo
- Former names: Polytechnic Institute of Vila Real (1973-1979); University Institute of Trás-os-Montes and Alto Douro (1979-1986)
- Motto: Scientia et Labore Omnia Adipiscere (Latin)
- Motto in English: Science and hard work to gain everything
- Type: Public research university
- Established: 1986; 40 years ago
- Academic affiliations: CGU; EUA; UNIMED; Universia
- Endowment: €60.5 million (2023)
- Rector: Emídio Ferreira dos Santos Gomes
- Academic staff: 489 faculty members (2023)
- Students: 7,676 (2021)
- Undergraduates: 6,450 (2021)
- Postgraduates: 1,226 (2021)
- Location: Vila Real, Portugal; 41°17′14.57″N 7°44′20.18″W
- Campus: 120 hectares (300 acres); Rural
- Colors: Blue
- Website: www.utad.pt/en/

The University of Trás-os-Montes and Alto Douro (UTAD; Portuguese: Universidade de Trás-os-Montes e Alto Douro) is a public university located in the north-eastern city of Vila Real, Portugal.

It became a public university in 1986, although its history also includes a heritage received from its predecessor, the Polytechnic Institute of Vila Real, created in 1973. This Institute took on a relevant role in the development of the region, and in September 1979, it was converted into the University Institute of Trás-os-Montes and Alto Douro. It was due to the intense activity in the fields of teaching and scientific and technological research that, less than ten years later, the government granted its status as a qualified University.

The campus includes the Botanical Garden of the University of Trás-os-Montes e Alto Douro, which features an interpretive center for visitors.

UTAD campus location and covered area

== Organization ==
The University of Trás-os-Montes and Alto includes four university schools and one polytechnic school:

- School of Agricultural and Veterinary Sciences (ECAV; Portuguese: Escola de Ciências Agrárias e Veterinárias)
- School of Sciences and Technology (ECT; Portuguese: Escola de Ciências e Tecnologias)
- School of Life and Environmental Sciences (ECVA; Portuguese: Escola de Ciências da Vida e do Ambiente)
- School of Human and Social Sciences (ECHS; Portuguese: Escola de Ciências Humanas e Sociais)
- School of Health (ESS; Portuguese: Escola Superior de Saúde) - polytechnic.

== Academic programs ==
=== Bachelor degrees ===
All BAs listed below are at major level. The Portuguese-language title, Licenciatura, indicates that they confer an automatic Licensure for working in a particular profession. In spite of this, some professions may additionally require enrolling in specific professional orders. All engineering, architecture, and medical degrees of the University of Trás-os-Montes and Alto Douro are recognised ("reconhecidos") by these professional orders, and students completing a Bachelor of Arts at this university are exempted from additional examinations for access to those orders. Both university and polytechnic types of degree are awarded in UTAD, however, most are University.

The Nursing degree is given at the School of Health (ESS; Portuguese: Escola Superior de Saúde).

- Sociocultural Leadership (Animação Sociocultural) (Admissions Closed on 2012/2013)
- Landscape Architecture (Arquitectura Paisagista)
- Bioengineering (Bioengenharia)
- Biology (Biologia)
- Biology and Geology (Biologia e Geologia)
- Biochemistry (Bioquímica)
- Food Science (Ciência Alimentar)
- Communication Sciences (Ciências da Comunicação)
- Sport Sciences (Ciências do Desporto)
- Communications and Multimedia (Comunicação e Multimédia)
- Applied Ecology (Ecologia Aplicada) (Admissions Closed on 2012/2013)
- Economics (Economia)
- Elementary Education (Educação Básica)
- Physical Education (Educação Física e Desporto Escolar)
- Nursing (Enfermagem) (Given at ESEVR)
- Agricultural Engineering (Engenharia Agrícola)
- Biomedical Engineering (Engenharia Biomédica)
- Civil Engineering (Engenharia Civil)
- Energy Engineering (Engenharia de Energias)
- Human Accessibility and Rehabilitation Engineering (Engenharia de Reabilitação e Acessibilidade Humanas)
- Environmental Engineering (Engenharia do Ambiente)
- Electrical Engineering (Engenharia Electrotécnica e de Computadores)
- Forest Engineering (Engenharia Florestal)
- Informatics Engineering (Engenharia Informática)
- Mechanical Engineering (Engenharia Mecânica)
- Zootechnical Engineering (Engenharia Zootécnica)
- Oenology (Enologia)
- Genetics and Biotechnology (Genética e Biotecnologia)
- Management (Gestão)
- Languages and Business Relationships (Línguas e Relações Empresariais)
- Languages, Literatures and Cultures (Línguas, Literaturas e Culturas)
- Veterinary Medicine (Medicina Veterinária) (Integrated Master – BA+MSc)
- Psychology (Psicologia)
- Psychomotor Rehabilitation (Reabilitação Psicomotora)
- Social Service (Serviço Social)
- Theatre and Performing Arts (Teatro e Artes Performativas)
- Tourism (Turismo)

=== Master's degrees ===
- Agronomic Engineering (Engenharia Agronómica)
- Biochemistry (Bioquímica)
- Bioinformatics and Applications to Life Sciences (Bioinformática e Aplicações às Ciências da Vida)
- Biomedical Engineering (Engenharia Biomédica)
- Biotechnology for Health Sciences (Biotecnologia para as Ciências da Saúde)
- Childhood Education and Teaching of Basic Education, 1st Cycle (Educação Pré-Escolar e Ensino do 1º Ciclo do Ensino Básico)
- Cities Challenges (Desafio das Cidades)
- Civil Engineering (Engenharia Civil)
- Clinical Laboratory Biology (Biologia Clínica Laboratorial)
- Communication Sciences (Ciências da Comunicação)
- Community nursing in family health nursing (Enfermagem Comunitária na Área de Enfermagem de Saúde Familiar)
- Cultural Sciences (Ciências da Cultura)
- Economic and Management Sciences (Ciências Económicas e Empresariais)
- Educational Sciences (Ciências da Educação)
- Electrical and Computing Engineering (Engenharia Eletrotécnica e de Computadores)
- Environmental Engineering (Engenharia do Ambiente)
- Food Engineering (Engenharia Alimentar)
- Forestry Engineering (Engenharia Florestal)
- Geographic Information Systems on Agronomic and Forestry Sciences (Sistemas de Informação Geográfica em Ciências Agronómicas e Florestais)
- Gerontology : Physical Activity and Health in the Elderly (Gerontologia: Atividade Física e Saúde no Idoso)
- Health Care Services Management (Gestão dos Serviços de Saúde)
- Informatics Engineering (Engenharia Informática)
- Informatics Engineering and Web Technology (Engenharia Informática e Tecnologia Web)
- International Master in Performance Analysis of Sport (Mestrado Internacional em Análise da Performance Desportiva)
- Landscape Architecture (Arquitetura Paisagista)
- Management (Gestão)
- Mechanical Engineering (Engenharia Mecânica)
- Multimedia Technology (Tecnologia Multimédia)
- Oenology and Viticulture (Enologia e Viticultura)
- Outdoor Sport Sustainability and Health (Desporto de Natureza Sustentabilidade e Saúde)
- Psychology (Psicologia)
- Social Work (Serviço Social)
- Sports Sciences (Ciências do Desporto)
- Teaching 1st CBE and Mathematics & Natural Sciences in 2nd CBE (Ensino do 1^{o} CEB e de Matemática & Ciências Naturais no 2^{o}CEB)
- Teaching of Computer Science (Ensino de Informática)
- Teaching of Physical Education at basic and secondary education levels (Ensino de Educação Física nos Ensinos Básico e Secundário)
- Teaching on 1st Cycle of Basic Education and Portuguese , History and Geography of Portugal in the 2nd Cycle of Basic Education (Ensino do 1º CEB e Português, História e Geografia de Portugal no 2º CEB)
- Technologic, Comparative and Molecular Genetics (Genética Molecular Comparativa e Tecnológica)
- Zootechnical Engineering (Engenharia Zootécnica)

=== Doctoral degrees ===
- Computer and Electrical Engineering (Engenharia Electrotécnica e de Computadores)
- Technology and Comparative Molecular Genetics (Genética Molecular Comparativa e Tecnológica)
- Computer Science (Informática)

=== Post-baccalaureate studies ===
- Special Education (Pós-Licenciatura em Educação Especial)

=== Postgraduate studies ===
- Management of Theme Routes (Pós-Gradução em Gestão de Rotas Temáticas)
- Translation Studies (Pós-Gradução em Tradução)

== Notable alumni and professors ==
- Abílio De Jesus - Portuguese researcher, professor and engineer
- Carla Madureira - Portuguese politician
- Filipe Pinto - Portuguese singer
- José A.F.O. Correia - Portuguese researcher, professor and engineer
- Manuel Pinto Coelho - Portuguese physician and author

== See also ==
- List of universities and colleges in Portugal
- Higher education in Portugal
