= Botanical Garden of the University of Trás-os-Montes e Alto Douro =

Botanic garden in Portugal

Jardim Botânico da Universidade de Trás-os-Montes e Alto Douro
- Botanical Garden of University of Trás-os-Montes and Alto Douro
- Interactive map of Jardim Botânico da Universidade de Trás-os-Montes e Alto Douro
- Type: Botanical garden
- Location: Vila Real, Portugal
- Coordinates: 41.2873°N 7.7414°W
- Opened: 1988
- Website: Official website

The Botanical Garden of University of Trás-os-Montes and Alto Douro (Portuguese: Jardim Botânico da Universidade de Trás-os-Montes e Alto Douro) is a botanical garden established in 1988. It is located within the campus of the University of Trás-os-Montes and Alto Douro (UTAD), in Vila Real, Portugal, and has an interpretive centre for visitors.

== Collections ==
The Botanical Garden includes 15 thematic collections:

- Plants from the Douro Valley
- Mediterranean plants from acidic, siliceous soils
- Mediterranean plants from alkaline, calcareous soils
- Ericaceae
- Ancient plants, including Magnoliaceae and Metasequoia glyptostroboides
- Cistaceae and Fabaceae
- Fagaceae
- Myrtaceae
- Wild fruits
- Medicinal and aromatic herbs
- Ground cover plants
- Forestry plants
- Ornamental conifers
- Vitaceae
- 'The Ages of Mankind', a collection dedicated to the changes in vegetation that occurred during Human evolution, as well as ethnobotany and domestication. This collection is dedicated to Lady Jane Renfrew and José Alves Ribeiro.
