= Álvaro Padilla =

Spanish footballer (born 2006)

Personal information
- Full name: Álvaro Padilla Escribá
- Date of birth: 25 April 2006 (age 20)
- Place of birth: Elche, Spain
- Position: Winger

Team information
- Current team: Elche B
- Number: 18

Youth career
- Costa City
- Kelme
- 2020–2022: Hércules
- 2022–2024: Almería
- 2024–2025: Elche

Senior career*
Years	Team	Apps	(Gls)
2025–	Elche B	15	(1)
2026–	Elche	1	(0)
- * Club domestic league appearances and goals as of 17 August 2026

Álvaro Padilla Escribá (born 25 April 2006) is a Spanish professional footballer who plays as a left winger for Elche CF Ilicitano.

== Career ==
Born in Elche, Alicante, Valencian Community, Padilla represented Club Costa City, Kelme CF and Hércules CF before moving to UD Almería in 2022. In 2024, he left for Elche CF and was initially assigned to the Juvenil team.

Promoted to the reserves ahead of the 2025–26 season, Padilla made his senior debut on 27 September 2025, coming on as a late substitute in a 1–0 Segunda Federación away win over Real Madrid C, and scored his first goal the following 12 April, in a 3–1 away win over CD Tenerife B. After spending the 2026 pre-season with the main squad, he made his professional – and La Liga – debut on 17 August of that year, replacing for Germán Valera late into a 1–1 away draw against Deportivo de A Coruña.
