= Esther Titilayo Akinlabi =

Nigerian South African engineer

- Títílayò Akinlabi
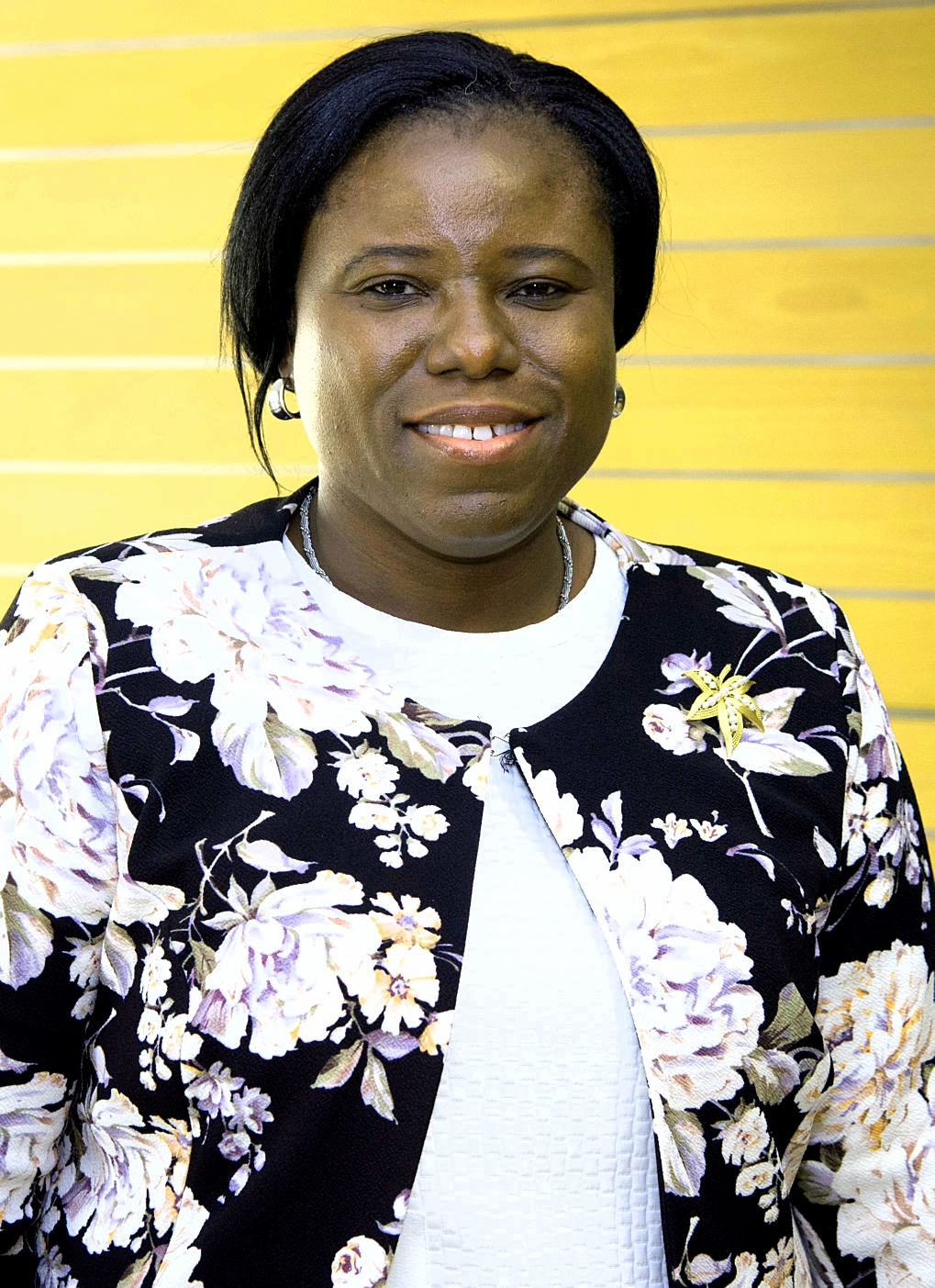
- Born: Kabba, Kogi State Nigeria
- Citizenship: Nigeria
- Education: Federal University of Technology Akure; University of Port Harcourt; Nelson Mandela University; University of Johannesburg
- Scientific career
- Fields: Mechanical engineering
- Workplaces: Pan African University for Life and Earth Sciences Institute (PAULESI); University of Johannesburg; Northumbria University; Colorado State University

Esther Titilayo Akinlabi is a Nigerian academic who is professor of mechanical engineering at Colorado State University. She served as the deputy faculty pro vice chancellor for research and knowledge exchange at the Faculty of Engineering and Environment of Northumbria University, Newcastle, United Kingdom. Prior to that, she was the director of the Pan African University for Life and Earth Sciences Institute (PAULESI) in Nigeria. She was the head of department of Mechanical Engineering Science, Faculty of Engineering and the Built Environment at the University of Johannesburg, South Africa. She was also the vice dean for teaching and learning there. She is a member of Organization for Women in Science for the Developing World and a fellow of the African Academy of Sciences.

== Early life and education ==
Esther Titilayo Akinlabi was born in Kabba, Kogi State, Nigeria. She graduated from St Barnabas Secondary School, Kabba, and obtained her first degree in agricultural engineering from the Federal University of Technology, Akure, in 1997. She obtained her M.Eng. in mechanical engineering from University of Port Harcourt, Rivers State, Nigeria, in 2003 and she moved to Nelson Mandela Metropolitan University, Port Elizabeth, South Africa for her PhD, which she obtained in 2010.

== Awards and memberships ==
Akinlabi is an alumnus of the South African Young Academy of Science. She is a registered member of the Engineering Council of South Africa, the Council for the Regulation of Engineering in Nigeria, the South African Institution of Mechanical Engineering, the American Society of Mechanical Engineers, the Nigerian Society of Engineers, the Organization for Women in Science for the Developing World and an international editorial board member of the journal Materials & Design.

== Personal life ==
Akinlabi is married to Stephen A. Akinlabi, who is an associate professor of mechanical engineering at Colorado State University
