= Felipe Mesones =

Argentine footballer and coach

Personal information
- Full name: Felipe Mesones Temperán
- Date of birth: 9 February 1936
- Place of birth: Buenos Aires, Argentina
- Date of death: 15 December 2017 (aged 81)
- Place of death: Murcia, Spain
- Position: Winger

Youth career
- Boca Juniors

Senior career*
Years	Team	Apps	(Gls)
1952–1953	Boca Juniors	5	(0)
1953–1955	San Lorenzo		
1955–1956	Atlanta		
1956–1958	Independiente		
1958–1963	Murcia	55	(11)
1961–1962	→ Levante (loan)	4	(0)
1963–1966	Hospitalet	64	(5)
1966–1967	Europa	1	(0)
Total		129	(16)

Managerial career
- 1967–1969: San Telmo
- 1969–1970: Sporting Mahonés
- 1970–1972: Cartagena
- 1972–1974: Murcia
- 1975–1976: Tenerife
- 1976–1977: Elche
- 1977: Hércules
- 1978–1980: Salamanca
- 1981–1982: Elche
- 1982: Valladolid
- 1983–1984: Granada
- 1984–1985: Salamanca
- 1985–1987: Cartagena
- 1987–1988: Elche
- 1989–1991: Murcia
- 1991–1992: Salamanca
- 1992: Betis
- 1993: Valladolid
- 1994: Hércules
- 1995–1996: Elche
- 1996–1997: Murcia
- 1998: Xerez
- 2000: Granada
- 2000: Elche
- 2001: Cartagena
- * Club domestic league appearances and goals

Felipe Mesones Temperán (9 February 1936 – 15 December 2017) was an Argentine football right winger and coach.

== Playing career ==
Born in Buenos Aires, Mesones spent the vast majority of his career in Spain, representing Real Murcia CF, Levante UD, CE L'Hospitalet and CE Europa, with all clubs competing in the Segunda División. In his native country he appeared for Boca Juniors, San Lorenzo de Almagro and Club Atlético Atlanta, and also had a stint at Independiente Santa Fe in Colombia.

Mesones retired at the end of the 1966–67 season while in service of Catalonia-based Europa, eventually amassing totals of 124 games and 16 goals in the second division.

== Coaching career ==
As a manager, Mesones worked in the Spanish La Liga for nine campaigns, adding another 15 in the second tier. On 27 April 1980, whilst at the helm of UD Salamanca, he was involved in a match fixing incident also involving CD Málaga which resulted in a two-year ban for himself, intermediary Raúl Castronovo and opposing player Julio Orozco.

In late January 2000, training with his club Granada CF, the 64-year-old Mesones suffered a heart attack and was admitted to intensive care unit. His last spell consisted of nine games with Cartagonova FC, in the Segunda División B.

== Death ==
Mesones died on 15 December 2017 at the age of 81 in Murcia, after a long battle with illness.
