= José A.F.O. Correia =

Portuguese engineer and researcher

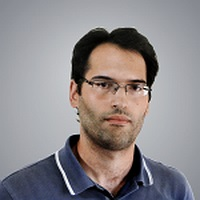
- July, 2020
- Born: 18 July 1984 (age 42); Peso da Régua, Portugal
- Education: University of Porto, University of Coimbra and University of Trás-os-Montes and Alto Douro in Portugal
- Scientific career
- Fields: Engineering, Structural integrity and failure
- Workplaces: University of Porto in Porto (Portugal), Delft University of Technology in Delft (Netherlands)
- Website: José A.F.O. Correia

José A.F.O. Correia (born 18 July 1984), also known as José António Correia, is a Portuguese researcher, professor and engineer.

== Biography ==
José A.F.O. Correia (JAFOC) is a researcher in fatigue, structural integrity and fracture mechanics at the University of Porto of Porto, Portugal, since 2019. He is invited professor at the University of Coimbra, Portugal, since 2016. He is also guest teacher at the Delft University of Technology, Netherlands. In 2007, José A.F.O. Correia is graduated in Civil Engineering at the University of Trás-os-Montes and Alto Douro (Portugal). In 2009, he obtained the Master Science in Civil Engineering in the Structural Mechanics area at the University of Trás-os-Montes and Alto Douro (Portugal). He is also a specialist in steel and mixed constructions by the University of Coimbra, Portugal (2010). After that, he completed his Ph.D. in Civil Engineering – Structures at the University of Porto (Portugal), in 2015.

He is chairman of the technical committees ESIS TC12 on Risk Analysis and Safety of Large Structures and Components and ESIS TC03 on Fatigue of Engineering Materials and Structures, 2017 and 2020, respectively, of European Structural Integrity Society.

He is Editor-in-chief or Editor and member of the editorial board of several scientific journals and book series, such as:

- Editor-in-Chief of the Structural Integrity book series
- Editor-in-Chief of the Proceedings of the Institution of Civil Engineers: Smart Infrastructure and Construction
- Editor-in-Chief of the International Journal of Ocean Systems Management
- Section Editor-in-Chief of the Modelling of Engineering Structures section of the Modelling MDPI journal
- Member of the editorial board of the International Journal of Fatigue
