= Tomeu Llompart =

Spanish footballer and coach

Personal information
- Full name: Bartolomeu Llompart Coll
- Date of birth: 6 October 1944 (age 82)
- Place of birth: Inca, Spain
- Height: 1.77 m (5 ft 10 in)
- Position: Centre back

Youth career
- 1958–1960: Zarra de Inca
- 1960–1962: Juventud Sallista
- 1962–1963: Constancia

Senior career*
Years	Team	Apps	(Gls)
1963–1964	Constancia	30	(0)
1964–1977	Elche	315	(4)
Total		345	(4)

International career
1963	Spain U18	1	(0)
1967	Spain U23	3	(0)

Managerial career
- 1977–1980: Elche Ilicitano
- 1980–1981: Alicante
- 1981–1982: Eldense
- 1983–1984: Crevillente
- 1987–1988: Novelda
- 1989: Orihuela Deportiva
- 1990–1991: Orihuela Deportiva
- 1991–1992: Elche
- 1992–1993: Mallorca (assistant)
- 1996–1997: Mallorca B
- 1997: Mallorca
- 1997–1999: Mallorca (assistant)
- 2002: Mallorca (caretaker)
- 2002–2003: Mallorca B
- 2004: Mallorca (caretaker)
- 2005–2006: Mallorca B
- 2010–2011: Torrellano
- 2011–2012: Elche Ilicitano
- * Club domestic league appearances and goals

Bartolomeu "Tomeu" Llompart Coll (born 6 October 1944) is a Spanish retired footballer who played as a central defender, and a coach.

Most of his playing days were spent with Elche (13 seasons, 11 of those in La Liga, where he amassed totals of 252 games – a best-ever in the club – and four goals), whereas his manager career was closely associated with Mallorca, in various capacities.

== Playing career ==
Born in Inca, Majorca, Llompart signed for Elche CF in 1964 at the age of 19, after spending one season in Segunda División with local club CD Constancia. He made his La Liga debut on 20 September 1964 in a 0–1 home loss to Sevilla FC, scoring his first goal in the competition roughly one year later, against the same opponent (1–1, same venue).

Already as captain, Llompart, who played 125 consecutive games in the top level with his main club, helped to a presence in 1969 Copa del Generalísimo final, lost against Athletic Bilbao. Against the same rival and also in the Copa del Rey, in 1977, he suffered a tibia injury that all but ended his career, aged nearly 33.

== Coaching career ==
Llompart's coaching career lasted four decades, his first spell being with Elche CF Ilicitano in 1977. In the 1990–91 campaign he first worked with the professionals, being relegated from the second division with Orihuela Deportiva CF even though he led the team to the sixth position, for financial irregularities.

In 1992, Llompart returned to his native Balearic Islands and joined RCD Mallorca's coaching staff, going on to work for the organization during the following 14 years, as a caretaker, B-team coach and assistant to the main squad. Late into 1996–97 he replaced Víctor Muñoz at the helm of the latter, as they finally finished third and promoted to the top flight in the playoffs, against Rayo Vallecano.

In 2010–11, Llompart coached Torrellano Illice CF in Tercera División. The following season he joined former team Ilicitano, promoting from the regional championships at the first attempt.
