= Structural Integrity =

- Discipline: Materials science, strength of materials, structural integrity and failure
- Language: English
- Edited by: José A.F.O. Correia, Abílio De Jesus

Publication details
- History: 2017–present
- Publisher: Springer Science+Business Media

Standard abbreviations
- ISO 4: Struct. Integr.

Indexing
- ISSN: 2522-560X (print); 2522-5618 (web)
- OCLC no.: 1187391367

Links
- Journal homepage; Online archive

Structural Integrity is a scientific book series covering the research field and technical view of the structural integrity and failure area. The series was established in 2017 and is published by Springer Science+Business Media. The editors-in-chief are José A.F.O. Correia and Abílio De Jesus (University of Porto). It is abstracted and indexed in Scopus.

== Structural Integrity Awards ==
Every year, the awards committee, composed of the editors and the editorial advisory board, selects the best contribution to the series for the "Structural Integrity-Series Award". In addition, the "Structural Integrity Award of Merit" honors a person with outstanding contributions in the structural integrity and failure area.

As of 2020 the winners of the "Structural Integrity Award of Merit" have been:

- 2018: Francesco Iacoviello (University of Cassino and Southern Lazio)
- 2019: Krishnaswamy Ravi-Chandar (University of Texas at Austin)
- 2020: Filippo Berto (Norwegian University of Science and Technology)
