= María Oltra =

Spanish politician

María Asunción Oltra Torres (born 14 August 1963 in Tavernes de Valldigna, Spain) is a Spanish politician who belongs to the main opposition People's Party (PP).

Single, she served as the head of 'Equitativa' security company. In 1995 she was elected councillor for her home town of Tavernes de Valldigna, serving as councillor until 2003. In 2000 she was selected as part of the PP list for the Spanish Congress of Deputies for Valencia Province. Placed eleventh on the list, she initially failed to win a seat in March 2000 as the PP won only nine seats. However, two months later, after resignations of three sitting deputies, she joined the Congress as substitute for José María Michavila. For the 2004 election, she was promoted to seventh place on the PP list and was re-elected although she did not stand in 2008.
