= International Journal of Fatigue =

Fracture mechanic academic journal (1979 - )

- Discipline: Fatigue of materials, fracture mechanics
- Language: English
- Edited by: G. Kang, M.D. Sangid, M. Vormwald

Publication details
- History: 1979–present
- Publisher: Elsevier
- Frequency: Monthly
- Open access: Hybrid
- Impact factor: 6.0 (2022)

Standard abbreviations
- ISO 4: Int. J. Fatigue

Indexing
- CODEN: IJFADB
- ISSN: 0142-1123 (print); 1879-3452 (web)
- LCCN: 81640445
- OCLC no.: 173881240

Links
- Journal homepage; Online archive

The International Journal of Fatigue is a monthly peer-reviewed scientific journal covering research, theory, and practice concerning the fatigue of materials and structures. The journal is published by Elsevier in affiliation with the European Structural Integrity Society. As of October 2022, the editors-in-chief are Guozheng Kang (Southwest Jiaotong University), Michael D. Sangid (Purdue University), and Michael Vormwald (TU Darmstadt).

== Abstracting and indexing ==
The journal is abstracted and indexed in:

- Chemical Abstracts Service
- Current Contents/Engineering, Computing & Technology
- EBSCO databases
- Inspec
- Metadex
- PASCAL
- ProQuest databases
- Science Citation Index Expanded
- Scopus
- ZbMATH Open

According to the Journal Citation Reports, the journal has a 2022 impact factor of 6.0.

== See also ==
- Fracture mechanics
- Solid mechanics
