= Alexander M. Korsunsky =

British materials scientist

Alexander M. Korsunsky is a British materials scientist. He is a specialist in the engineering microscopy of materials and structures for optimisation of design, durability and performance. He has made numerous contributions to science in the areas of materials mechanics, microscopy, residual stress evaluation and modelling, eigenstrain theory and structural integrity. He founded the Multi-Beam Laboratory for Engineering Microscopy (MBLEM) in the University of Oxford, Department of Engineering Science, and Centre for In situ Processing Studies (CIPS) in the Research Complex at Harwell. His research group pursues studies of a wide range of natural and engineered materials, from flax fibres, seashell nacre and human dental tissues to zirconia ceramics and porcelain veneers, advanced aerospace alloys, films and coatings, and materials for energy.

Alexander received his degree of Doctor of Philosophy (DPhil) from Merton College, University of Oxford, following undergraduate education in theoretical physics. He has held visiting positions at the National University of Singapore, University Roma Tré, and ENSICAEN in France. He is Professor Emeritus in Engineering Science at the University of Oxford and Trinity College, Oxford.

In 2014-2024 he was Editor-in-Chief of Materials & Design, a major Elsevier journal (2023 IF 9.417).

== See also ==
- The Korsunsky Work-of-Indentation Approach
