= Alfonso Fernandez (footballer) =

Spanish footballer (born 1963)

Personal information
- Full name: Alfonso Fernandez Leal
- Date of birth: 20 April 1963 (age 63)
- Place of birth: Carborana, Spain
- Height: 1.76 m (5 ft 9 in)
- Position: Midfielder

Senior career*
Years	Team	Apps	(Gls)
–1987	Royale Alliance Melen-Micheroux		
1987–1988	Standard Liège	26	(0)
1989	Elche	18	(1)
1989–1991	Castellón	62	(2)
1991–1993	Lyon	40	(2)
1995–1996	Eupen		
1996–1997	AC Hemptinne-Eghezée		
1998–2002	RFC Seraing		
- * Club domestic league appearances and goals

Alfonso Fernandez Leal (born 20 April 1963) is a Spanish former professional footballer who played as a midfielder.

== Early life ==
Fernandez Leal was born in 1963 in Spain. He has eight brothers and a sister.

== Career ==
Fernandez Leal started his career with Belgian side Royale Alliance Melen-Micheroux at the age of twenty-one. In 1987, he signed for Belgian side Standard Liège. In 1989, he signed for Spanish side La Liga side Elche. In 1989, he signed for Spanish La Liga side Castellón. In 1991, he signed for Ligue 1 side Lyon. In 1995, he signed for Belgian side Eupen. In 1996, he signed for Belgian side AC Hemptinne-Eghezée. In 1998, he signed for the Belgian side RFC Seraing.

== Style of play ==
Fernandez Leal mainly operated as a midfielder. He was described as "problematic in the field for his continued protests to the referees".
