= Yuncler =

- Municipality
- Flag Coat of arms

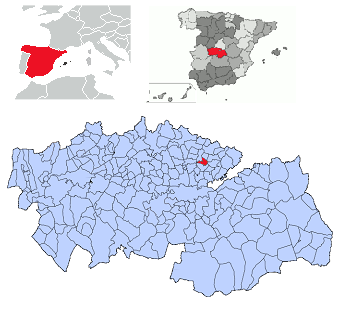

- Location in Spain
- Coordinates: 40°2′26″N 3°54′13″W
- Country: Spain
- Autonomous community: Castile-La Mancha
- Province: Toledo
- Comarca: La Sagra
- Judicial district: Illescas
- Founded: See text

Government
  - Alcalde: Luis Miguel Martín Ruiz (2020)

Area
  - Total: 18 km^{2} (6.9 sq mi)
- Elevation: 534 m (1,752 ft)

Population (2025-01-01)
  - Total: 5,275
  - Density: 290/km^{2} (760/sq mi)
- Demonym(s): Yunclereño, a o Yuncleroso, sa
- Time zone: UTC+1 (CET)
  - Summer (DST): UTC+2 (CEST)
- Postal code: 45529
- Official language(s): Castilian
- Website: Official website

Yuncler is a town and municipality in the Sagra shire, province of Toledo, Spain, 42 km to the south from the national capital, Madrid. It borders Villaluenga de la Sagra to the south, Yuncos and Cedillo to the north, Numancia to the northeast, Pantoja to the east and Cedillo to the west. It has an agricultural-based economy, with a recent surge in small businesses.

The climate is mediterranean. Winters are cold with temperatures, sometimes lower than 3 °C. The summers can be very hot, with temperatures over 37 °C.

Yuncler is a village where there is not a lot of rain data, but sometimes there are rainstorms.

== Etymology ==
Yunkler is derived from a moorish term, itself derived from junko meaning the species of sedge named Cyperus rotundus. In 12th century documents it is named as Ocner, Yunquer and Yunkler.

== Administration ==
After the 2020 elections, the local government consists of 9 council members from PSOE and 2 from PP.

The actual mayor is Luis Miguel Martín Ruíz from PSOE.

== History ==
The first settlers were of Moorish origins, being mentioned in documents dating back to 1179.

== Places of interest ==
- Labour house from the 19th century, declared historic and preserved intact, currently a hotel and restaurant named La Casa Grande.
- Santa María Magdalena church, declared historic. Together with La Casa Grande and the town hall (of modern construction) they form the church square (Plazuela de la Iglesia).
