= Materials & Design =

- Discipline: Materials science
- Language: English
- Edited by: Alexander Korsunsky

Publication details
- Former name: International Journal of Materials in Engineering Applications
- History: 1978-present
- Publisher: Elsevier
- Frequency: 24/year
- Impact factor: 8.2 (2025)

Standard abbreviations
- ISO 4: Mater. Des.

Indexing
- CODEN: MADSD2
- ISSN: 0264-1275
- LCCN: 90650038
- OCLC no.: 300759070

Links
- Journal homepage; Online access

Materials & Design is a peer-reviewed open access scientific journal published by Elsevier. It covers research on the practical applications of engineering materials including materials processing. Article formats are regular, express, and review articles (typically commissioned by the editors). The editor-in-chief is Alexander M. Korsunsky (Trinity College, Oxford). The journal was established in 1978 as the International Journal of Materials in Engineering Applications and obtained its current title in 1980.

== Abstracting and indexing ==
The journal is abstracted and indexed by:

- Current Contents/Engineering, Computing & Technology
- Inspec
- Materials Science Citation Index
- Metals Abstracts
- Physics Abstracts
- Scopus

According to the Journal Citation Reports, the journal has a 2025 impact factor of 8.2.
