= Alfonso Fernández-Canteli =

Spanish engineer, researcher and professor

- Born: 17 April 1945 (age 81); Oviedo, Spain
- Education: University of the Basque Country in Spain, ETH Zurich in Switzerland and Technical University of Madrid in Spain
- Scientific career
- Fields: Engineering, Structural integrity and failure
- Workplaces: University of Oviedo in Oviedo (Spain)
- Website: Alfonso Fernández-Canteli

Alfonso Fernández-Canteli (born 17 April 1945) is a Spanish researcher, professor and engineer in the field of the probabilistic fatigue modelling of materials, structural components and structures.

== Biography ==
Alfonso Fernández-Canteli is graduated in mechanical engineering at the University of the Basque Country, Spain (1970). Between 1970 and 1972, he obtained the Master Science in Civil Engineering at the ETH Zurich (Switzerland). In 1981, he completed his Ph.D. in Mechanical Engineering at the Technical University of Madrid (Spain). Fernández-Canteli joined at the University of Oviedo (Spain) in Gijón in 1981. In 2015 he became a professor emeritus and continued to teach and research.

== Contributions ==
He is known for his work on probabilistic fatigue modeling of materials and structural components using stress-life and strain-life methods. In 2001, Alfonso Fernández-Canteli and Enrique Castillo presented a particular form of a probabilistic model for materials under fatigue which embodies Weibull features and the size effect in a weakest-link framework. He and Enrique Castillo are authors of the book A Unified Statistical Methodology for Modeling Fatigue Damage that provides a unified methodology to derive models for fatigue life, which includes stress-life, strain-life, and crack propagation models (2009). His scientific advances in probabilistic modeling of fatigue based on the stress damage parameter served as a basis for the generalization of the probabilistic fatigue model allowing for various fatigue damage variables suggested by J. Correia (2017).

== Awards ==
- 2019: Robert Moskovic Award in recognition of an outstanding contribution to Unified Probabilistic Fatigue Methodology
