= Elche CF Ilicitano =

Spanish football club

Elche Ilicitano
- Full name: Elche Ilicitano Club de Fútbol
- Founded: 1932
- Ground: Estadio José Díez Iborra; Elche, Valencian Community, Spain
- Capacity: 1,500
- President: Joaquín Buitrago Marhuenda
- Head coach: Carlos Cuéllar
- League: Segunda Federación – Group 3
- 2025–26: Segunda Federación – Group 5, 12th of 18
Home colours	Away colours

Elche Ilicitano Club de Fútbol, known officially as Elche Ilicitano is a Spanish football team based in Elche, in the autonomous community of Valencia. Founded in 1932 as Club Deportivo Ilicitano, it is the reserve team of Elche, and plays in Segunda Federación – Group 3, holding home games at the Estadio José Díez Iborra, with a capacity of 1,500 seats.

Unlike in nations such as England, reserve teams in Spain play in the same football pyramid as their senior team rather than a separate league.

== History ==
The city of Elche started the 1930s with just over thirty-five thousand inhabitants, who shared interest in football. In April 1932 a new sports initiative arose, when a group of young people founded Club Deportivo Ilicitano (Sportman Club Ilicitano).

=== Background ===
- Sportman Club Ilicitano - (1932–41)
- Club Deportivo Ilicitano - (1941–92)
- Elche Club de Fútbol, S.A.D. "B" - (1992–2005)
- Elche Ilicitano - (2005–present)

== Season to season ==
- As CD Ilicitano, an independent team

Season	Tier	Division	Place	Copa del Rey
1934–35	5	2ª Reg.		
1935–36	5	2ª Reg.		
1939–40	5	2ª Reg.	4th	
1940–41	5	2ª Reg.		
1941–42	4	2ª Reg.	1st	
1942–43	3	1ª Reg.	5th	
1943–44	DNP			
1944–45	4	1ª Reg.	5th	
1945–46	4	1ª Reg.	10th	
1946–47	4	1ª Reg.	7th	
1947–48	4	1ª Reg.	6th	
1948–49	4	1ª Reg.	8th	
1949–50	4	1ª Reg.	4th	
1950–51	4	1ª Reg.	9th	
1951–52	4	1ª Reg.	3rd	
1952–53	DNP			
1953–54	DNP			
1954–55	DNP			
1955–56	4	1ª Reg.	4th	
1956–57	4	1ª Reg.	2nd	

Season	Tier	Division	Place	Copa del rey
1957–58	4	1ª Reg.	3rd	
1958–59	4	1ª Reg.	5th	
1959–60	4	1ª Reg.	(R)	
1960–61	4	1ª Reg.	17th	
1961–62	DNP			
1962–63	4	1ª Reg.	2nd	
1963–64	3	3ª	12th	
1964–65	3	3ª	8th	
1965–66	3	3ª	13th	
1966–67	3	3ª	9th	
1967–68	3	3ª	1st	
1968–69	2	2ª	16th	
1969–70	2	2ª	16th	
1970–71	3	3ª	15th	
1971–72	3	3ª	18th	
1972–73	4	Reg. Pref.	12th	
1973–74	4	Reg. Pref.	6th	
1974–75	4	Reg. Pref.	14th	
1975–76	4	Reg. Pref.	6th	
1976–77	4	Reg. Pref.	5th	

Season	Tier	Division	Place	Copa del rey
1977–78	5	Reg. Pref.	5th	
1978–79	5	Reg. Pref.	16th	
1979–80	5	Reg. Pref.	14th	
1980–81	4	3ª	12th	
1981–82	4	3ª	15th	
1982–83	4	3ª	13th	
1983–84	4	3ª	5th	
1984–85	4	3ª	4th	Second round

Season	Tier	Division	Place	Copa del Rey
1985–86	4	3ª	4th	
1986–87	4	3ª	17th	First round
1987–88	4	3ª	5th	
1988–89	4	3ª	17th	
1989–90	4	3ª	4th	
1990–91	4	3ª	5th	
1991–92	4	3ª	9th	

- As reserve team of Elche CF

Season	Tier	Division	Place
1992–93	5	Reg. Pref.	15th
1993–94	5	Reg. Pref.	3rd
1994–95	5	Reg. Pref.	3rd
1995–96	5	Reg. Pref.	4th
1996–97	5	Reg. Pref.	3rd
1997–98	4	3ª	8th
1998–99	4	3ª	1st
1999–2000	4	3ª	7th
2000–01	4	3ª	14th
2001–02	4	3ª	9th
2002–03	4	3ª	8th
2003–04	4	3ª	13th
2004–05	4	3ª	6th
2005–06	4	3ª	14th
2006–07	4	3ª	17th
2007–08	4	3ª	20th
2008–09	5	Reg. Pref.	2nd
2009–10	4	3ª	18th
2010–11	5	Reg. Pref.	2nd
2011–12	5	Reg. Pref.	1st

Season	Tier	Division	Place
2012–13	4	3ª	1st
2013–14	3	2ª B	6th
2014–15	3	2ª B	19th
2015–16	4	3ª	4th
2016–17	4	3ª	8th
2017–18	4	3ª	16th
2018–19	4	3ª	16th
2019–20	4	3ª	15th
2020–21	4	3ª	1st / 4th
2021–22	5	3ª RFEF	8th
2022–23	5	3ª Fed.	11th
2023–24	5	3ª Fed.	1st
2024–25	4	2ª Fed.	10th
2025–26	4	2ª Fed.	12th
2026–27	4	2ª Fed.	

- 2 seasons in Segunda División
- 2 seasons in Segunda División B
- 3 seasons in Segunda Federación
- 38 seasons in Tercera División
- 3 seasons in Tercera Federación/Tercera División RFEF

== Current squad ==
As of 14 September 2026.

Note: Flags indicate national team as defined under FIFA eligibility rules; some limited exceptions apply. Players may hold more than one non-FIFA nationality.

No.	Pos.	Nation	Player
1	GK	ESP	Alejandro Ramos
2	MF	ESP	Alex Herráiz
3	DF	ESP	Nico Salvador
4	DF	ESP	Eloy Moreno
5	DF	ESP	David Delgado
6	MF	ESP	Antonio Martínez
7	MF	ESP	Carlos Martín
8	MF	ESP	Nico González
9	FW	ARG	Mateo Sciancalepore
10	FW	ESP	Juan Piera
11	DF	ESP	Álvaro Miralles
13	GK	ESP	Owen Bosch

No.	Pos.	Nation	Player
14	MF	ESP	Álvaro Tamargo
19	FW	ESP	Ismael Fernández
20	DF	ESP	Alejandro Campos
21	FW	ESP	Álvaro Padilla
22	DF	ESP	Dani Nieto
23	MF	ESP	Mark Motilla
29	FW	ESP	Jorge de Vicente
—	DF	ROU	Albert Niculăesei
—	DF	DOM	Alejandro Martín
—	DF	ESP	Bakary Traoré
—	DF	ESP	Ismael Muñoz
—	FW	ESP	Álex Sánchez

=== Youth players ===
Note: Flags indicate national team as defined under FIFA eligibility rules; some limited exceptions apply. Players may hold more than one non-FIFA nationality.

No.	Pos.	Nation	Player
26	DF	ESP	Salva Juárez
30	FW	ESP	Daniel Chuecos

No.	Pos.	Nation	Player
31	GK	ESP	Diego Sánchez
32	MF	ESP	Enrique Mallol

== Coaching staff ==
Position	Staff
Head coach	(Spain) Carlos Cuéllar
Assistant coach	(Spain) Jaime Agraz
Goalkeeping coach	(Spain) Fran Díez
Rehab fitness coach	(Spain) Álvaro García
Analyst	(Spain) David Botella
Delegate	(Spain) Paco García
Kit man	(Spain) Olegario

Last updated: April 2026
Source: Elche CF
