= Elche CF =

Spanish professional football club

Elche
- Full name: Elche Club de Fútbol, S.A.D.
- Nicknames: Los Franjiverdes / Els franja-verds (The Green-Striped Ones); Los Ilicitanos / Els Il·licitans (The Ones from Elche)
- Founded: 10 January 1923; 103 years ago as Elche Foot-ball Club
- Stadium: Estadio Martínez Valero
- Capacity: 33,732
- Owner: Christian Bragarnik
- President: Joaquín Buitrago
- Head coach: Martín Anselmi
- League: La Liga
- 2025–26: La Liga, 15th of 20
- Website: elchecf.es
Home colours	Away colours	Third colours

Elche Club de Fútbol, S.A.D. (Valencian: Elx Club de Futbol, S.A.D.) is a Spanish professional football club based in Elche, Province of Alicante, in the Valencian Community, Spain. Founded in 1923, the club competes in La Liga, holding home matches at the Estadio Martínez Valero, with a capacity of 33,732 seats.

Founded in 1923 as the result of a merger between all of the town's clubs, Elche entered the league system in 1929, reaching Segunda División in 1934 and La Liga in 1959, finishing fifth in the latter tournament in 1963–64. The club were runners-up in the Copa del Rey in 1969.

== History ==
=== Foundation and early years ===
Elche Club de Fútbol was founded in the winter of 1923, after the merger of all of the town's football teams. The club's first-ever game was against Monóvar, where they beat the home team 4–0, and its first official match was a 2–0 win over Crevillente. In its first years Elche, like many teams of the time, played in an all white uniform. The team played its first league season in 1929–30, in the Tercera División, achieving promotion to the Segunda División in 1934. However, Elche suffered relegation for the first time six years later, but were promoted back the following season.

In the late 1950s, Elche achieved two consecutive promotions from the third level to La Liga, securing the club's first promotion to the latter competition with a 3–0 success against Tenerife in 1959.

=== 1959–78: La Liga ===
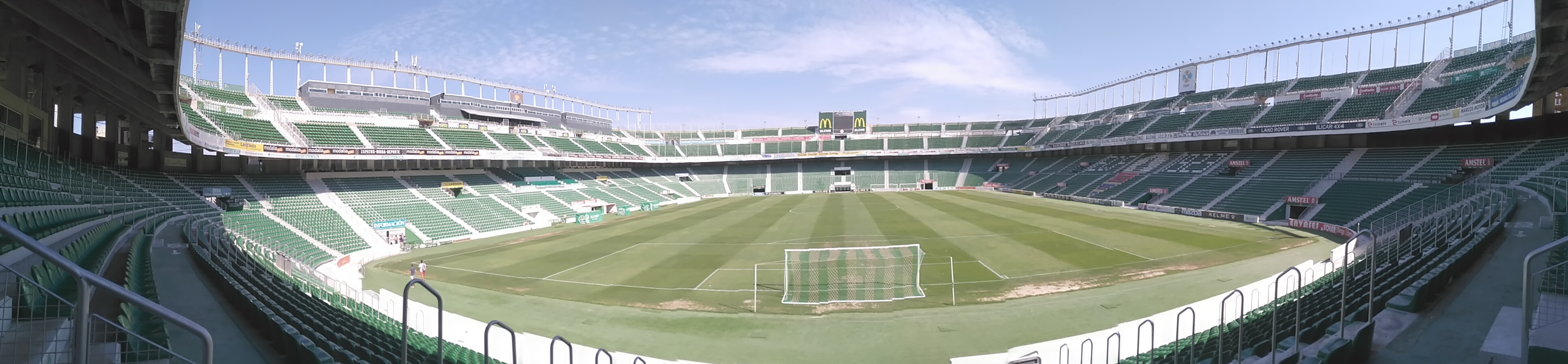
Estadio Martínez Valero

Elche opened its first season in the top level with a 1–1 draw against Real Oviedo, the first goal being scored by Vicente Pahuet. The club finished tenth out of 16 sides, nine points ahead of relegated Osasuna – the campaign included a 2–1 comeback home victory over Barcelona, but also a 2–11 loss at Real Madrid. The following season saw the team having to compete in the relegation/promotion play-off, where it overcame a 0–1 loss in the away leg against Atlético Ceuta with a 4–0 home victory.

Elche achieved their best-ever league finish in 1963–64, ranking in fifth position. The season also saw the club's reserve team, Elche Ilicitano, promote to Segunda División.

In 1969 the club reached their first and only Copa del Rey final, following victories over Pontevedra, Valencia and Real Sociedad. The semi-final against the latter was won 2–0 in a replay in neutral Madrid, as the tie had finished 4–4 on aggregate; the final, played on 15 June at the Santiago Bernabéu Stadium in the same city, brought a 0–1 loss to Athletic Bilbao.

After twelve seasons Elche were relegated to division two in 1971, having finished second from bottom. Two years later the team returned to the main category, as champions. Its second spell in the top flight lasted five seasons, often immerse in relegation fights as the best campaign (1974–75) ended with the club in eighth position; at the end of 1977–78 the side returned to the second division after finishing 17th out of 18 clubs, the last game being a 4–4 draw with Atlético Madrid, which was led 2–4 with five minutes remaining.

=== 80s and 90s: severe financial crisis ===
Chart of Elche CF league performance 1929–present

After the relegation Elche suffered in 1978, they never managed to gain promotion to the top flight – in fact, in the first five years since their return to the second level, they were fourth on three occasions and fifth on two (and on a further two, even on points with the third-placed team but with a worse goal difference), often losing the chance of promotion on the last matchday. Especially traumatic was the finish of the 1980–81 season: with one game remaining, they were second two points ahead of Rayo Vallecano and Racing de Santander, only needing a draw against Cádiz at the Martínez Valero; the game ended however in a loss, and Elche finished with 45 points alongside Castellón, Cádiz, Racing and Rayo.

A promotion finally occurred at the end of 1983–84, even though Elche only finished fifth in the regular season – the first two positions were occupied by Real Madrid Castilla and Athletic Bilbao B, who could not promote as reserve sides. The whole of the top division campaign was spent in the relegation zone, and relegation consequently befell as 17th. In 1988 they were promoted again for another cameo appearance, as the side went on to finish dead last with eighteen points, dropping down a category alongside Real Murcia, who they trailed by nine points; the last match for years in the category was a 1–3 away loss against Real Zaragoza, the goal coming courtesy of Alfonso Fernández.

After the relegation in 1989, Elche started to suffer heavily in the financial department, and were relegated to Segunda División B – the new third level created in 1977 – at the end of 1990–91. During the better part of the 1990s the club reached the second division promotion playoffs, only to consecutively fall short.

In 1997 Elche finally managed to return to the second division, being immediately relegated but subsequently gaining another promotion .

=== 2010s: return to the top flight ===
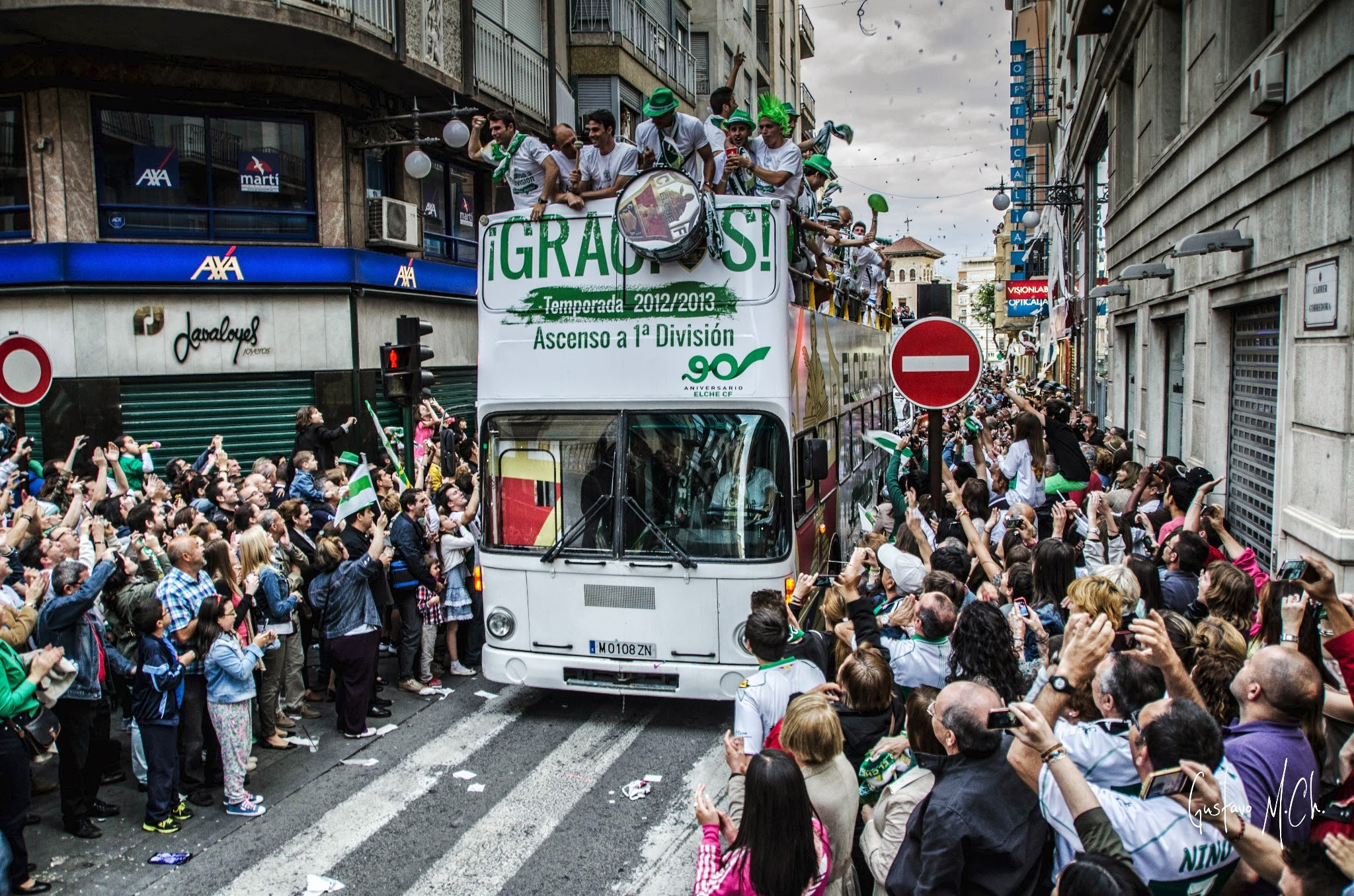
Elche squad and fans celebrating the return to La Liga in 2013

In 2010–11, again in the "silver category", the team finished fourth and thus qualified for the play-offs: after disposing of Real Valladolid in the first round (3–2 on aggregate) the dream of top flight promotion ended at the hands of Granada, on the away goals rule.

On 18 May 2013, following Barcelona B and Alcorcón's 1–1 draw, Elche was automatically promoted to the top level, returning to the competition after 24 years. In the meantime the team coached by Fran Escribá had broken a number of Segunda División records, being the only team to date able to lead the competition from the first until the last match of the season, setting in the process a new record of both matches won and points scored to date as well as the best first round in the history of Segunda's championship.

During the 2013–14 season, the team managed to stay in the top competition, with an average attendance for home matches estimated at 25,104 people.

In the 2014–15 season, despite managing once again to stay in the top flight (the team was already safe from relegation four matches before the end of the competition). Elche became the first team ever in the history of the Spanish Primera División being relegated to the Segunda following new regulations by the Spanish football league limiting excess debt and economic mismanagement.

In the 2016–17 season, Elche were relegated to the third division after 18 years in the professional league. One year later, Elche was promoted back to the second division after defeating Villarreal B in the final play-off promotion.

In the 2018–19 season, Elche finished right in the middle, in 11th place out of 22 teams.

In the 2019–20 season, Elche were promoted to La Liga by beating Girona in the promotion play-off final 1–0 on aggregate. They were promoted back to La Liga after five years in the second and third divisions.

In the 2022–23 season, Elche were relegated to the second division after three years in La Liga.

In the 2024–25 season, Elche were promoted to La Liga.

== Seasons ==
=== Season-by-season ===
- As Elche Football Club

Season	Tier	Division	Place	Copa del Rey
1929–30	3	3ª	2nd	Did Not Play
1931–32	3	3ª	5th	DNP
1932–33	3	3ª	2nd	DNP
1933–34	3	3ª	2nd	DNP
1934–35	2	2ª	4th	Sixth round
1935–36	2	2ª	8th	First round
1939–40	2	2ª	7th	DNP

- As Elche Club de Fútbol

Season	Tier	Division	Place	Copa del Rey
1940–41	3	3ª	1st	Second round
1941–42	2	2ª	6th	First round
1942–43	2	2ª	6th	DNP
1943–44	3	3ª	1st	DNP
1944–45	3	3ª	1st	DNP
1945–46	3	3ª	2nd	DNP
1946–47	3	3ª	2nd	DNP
1947–48	3	3ª	1st	Third round
1948–49	3	3ª	2nd	Second round
1949–50	2	2ª	14th	First round
1950–51	3	3ª	6th	DNP
1951–52	3	3ª	13th	DNP
1952–53	3	3ª	16th	DNP
1953–54	3	3ª	3rd	DNP
1954–55	3	3ª	1st	DNP
1955–56	3	3ª	3rd	DNP
1956–57	3	3ª	1st	DNP
1957–58	3	3ª	1st	DNP
1958–59	2	2ª	1st	Round of 32
1959–60	1	1ª	10th	Semi-finals

Season	Tier	Division	Place	Copa del Rey
1960–61	1	1ª	14th	Round of 32
1961–62	1	1ª	8th	Round of 16
1962–63	1	1ª	8th	Round of 16
1963–64	1	1ª	5th	Round of 32
1964–65	1	1ª	8th	Round of 32
1965–66	1	1ª	6th	Quarter-finals
1966–67	1	1ª	9th	Semi-finals
1967–68	1	1ª	11th	Quarter-finals
1968–69	1	1ª	9th	Runner-up
1969–70	1	1ª	11th	Round of 32
1970–71	1	1ª	15th	Round of 16
1971–72	2	2ª	4th	Fourth round
1972–73	2	2ª	2nd	Fourth round
1973–74	1	1ª	14th	Round of 32
1974–75	1	1ª	8th	Fourth round
1975–76	1	1ª	15th	Round of 32
1976–77	1	1ª	11th	Round of 16
1977–78	1	1ª	17th	Third round
1978–79	2	2ª	5th	Round of 16
1979–80	2	2ª	4th	Fifth round

Season	Tier	Division	Place	Copa del Rey
1980–81	2	2ª	4th	Third round
1981–82	2	2ª	4th	Round of 16
1982–83	2	2ª	7th	Third round
1983–84	2	2ª	5th	Second round
1984–85	1	1ª	17th	Second round
1985–86	2	2ª	4th	Second round
1986–87	2	2ª	4th	First round
1987–88	2	2ª	2nd	Round of 32
1988–89	1	1ª	20th	Round of 32
1989–90	2	2ª	14th	Second round
1990–91	2	2ª	17th	Round of 16
1991–92	3	2ª B	4th	Second round
1992–93	3	2ª B	3rd	Second round
1993–94	3	2ª B	12th	Fourth round
1994–95	3	2ª B	6th	First round
1995–96	3	2ª B	3rd	First round
1996–97	3	2ª B	2nd	First round
1997–98	2	2ª	19th	Second round
1998–99	3	2ª B	3rd	Second round
1999–2000	2	2ª	15th	Prelim. round

Season	Tier	Division	Place	Copa del Rey
2000–01	2	2ª	18th	Round of 64
2001–02	2	2ª	5th	Round of 64
2002–03	2	2ª	16th	Round of 64
2003–04	2	2ª	14th	Round of 64
2004–05	2	2ª	10th	Round of 16
2005–06	2	2ª	14th	First round
2006–07	2	2ª	10th	Third round
2007–08	2	2ª	10th	Round of 32
2008–09	2	2ª	12th	Round of 32
2009–10	2	2ª	6th	Second round
2010–11	2	2ª	4th	Third round
2011–12	2	2ª	11th	Third round
2012–13	2	2ª	1st	Second round
2013–14	1	1ª	16th	Round of 32
2014–15	1	1ª	13th	Round of 16
2015–16	2	2ª	11th	Second round
2016–17	2	2ª	21st	Third round
2017–18	3	2ª B	3rd	Round of 32
2018–19	2	2ª	11th	Third round
2019–20	2	2ª	6th	Round of 32

Season	Tier	Division	Place	Copa del Rey
2020–21	1	1ª	17th	Round of 32
2021–22	1	1ª	13th	Round of 16
2022–23	1	1ª	20th	Round of 32
2023–24	2	2ª	11th	Round of 32
2024–25	2	2ª	2nd	Round of 16
2025–26	1	1ª	15th	Round of 16
2026–27	1	1ª		TBD

- 26 seasons in La Liga
- 41 seasons in Segunda División
- 8 seasons in Segunda División B
- 19 seasons in Tercera División

== Current squad ==
As of 19 September 2026

Note: Flags indicate national team as defined under FIFA eligibility rules; some limited exceptions apply. Players may hold more than one non-FIFA nationality.

No.	Pos.	Nation	Player
1	GK	ARG	Matías Dituro
2	DF	ESP	Buba Sangaré
3	DF	ISR	Roy Revivo
4	DF	ESP	Bambo Diaby
5	MF	ARG	Federico Redondo
6	DF	ESP	Pedro Bigas (captain)
7	MF	ESP	Yago Santiago
8	MF	ESP	Marc Aguado
9	FW	ARG	Ezequiel Ponce
10	MF	ARG	Facundo Buonanotte (on loan from Brighton & Hove Albion)
11	MF	ESP	Germán Valera
12	MF	ESP	Gonzalo Villar
13	GK	ESP	Alejandro Iturbe
14	FW	ESP	Fer Niño

No.	Pos.	Nation	Player
15	DF	ARG	Kevin Lomónaco
16	MF	POR	Martim Neto
17	MF	ESP	Josan (3rd captain)
18	MF	FRA	Thomas Lemar (on loan from Atlético Madrid)
19	MF	COD	Grady Diangana
20	FW	ESP	Tete Morente
21	FW	CHI	Lucas Cepeda
22	DF	ESP	Rubén Sánchez
23	DF	ESP	Víctor Chust
24	FW	ARG	Abiel Osorio
26	DF	CRO	Matía Barzić
29	MF	MAR	Ali Houary
32	MF	MAR	Adam Boayar
47	MF	ESP	Javi Morcillo

=== Reserve team ===
Note: Flags indicate national team as defined under FIFA eligibility rules; some limited exceptions apply. Players may hold more than one non-FIFA nationality.

No.	Pos.	Nation	Player
30	FW	ESP	Álvaro Padilla

=== Out on loan ===
Note: Flags indicate national team as defined under FIFA eligibility rules; some limited exceptions apply. Players may hold more than one non-FIFA nationality.

No.	Pos.	Nation	Player
—	GK	ARG	Axel Werner (at Rosario Central until 30 June 2027)
—	DF	ESP	John Chetauya (at Mallorca until 30 June 2027)
—	DF	ESP	Pablo Felipe (at Teruel until 30 June 2027)

No.	Pos.	Nation	Player
—	FW	MAR	Nordin Al Lal (at Extremadura until 30 June 2027)
—	FW	ARG	Tiziano Perrotta (at Defensa y Justicia until 30 June 2027)
—	FW	ESP	Umaru Konare (at Ceuta until 30 June 2027)

== Coaching staff ==
Position	Staff
Head coach	(Argentina) Martín Anselmi
Assistant head coach	(Spain) Jon López
Fitness coach	(Spain) Xavi Moñino (Spain) Aitor Soler
Goalkeeping coach	(Spain) Javi Roda (Spain) Jon Pascua
Analyst	(Spain) Andrés Paz
Delegate	(Spain) Juan Sánchez
Material manager	(Spain) Greg Beranger (Spain) Pepito
Head of medical services	(Spain) Paco Martínez
Doctor	(Spain) Francisco Sánchez
Rehab fitness coach	(Spain) Marcelo Peñaranda
Physiotherapist	(Spain) Carlos Valero (Spain) Sergio Tur
Nutritionist	(Spain) Alejandro Martínez
Nurse	(Spain) Javier Sánchez

Last updated: 18 August 2025
Source: Elche CF (in Spanish)

== Honours ==
Segunda División

- Winners (2): 1958–59, 2012–13

== International players ==
- (Andorra) Marc Bernaus
- (Argentina) Juan Carlos Heredia
- (Argentina) Marcelo Trobbiani
- (Argentina) Willy Caballero
- (Belgium) Fernand Goyvaerts
- (Cape Verde) Garry Rodrigues
- (Chile) Enzo Roco
- (Republic of the Congo) Dominique Malonga
- (Croatia) Mario Pašalić
- (Denmark) Tommy Christensen
- (Denmark) Nicki Bille Nielsen
- (Equatorial Guinea) Rodolfo Bodipo
- (Equatorial Guinea) Iván Bolado
- (Ghana) Richmond Boakye
- (Ghana) Wakaso
- (Guinea) Sory Kaba
- (Honduras) José Cardona
- (Honduras) Gilberto Yearwood
- (Hungary) Balázs Molnár
- (Kosovo) Elbasan Rashani
- (Morocco) Moha
- (Nigeria) Benedict Iroha
- (Nigeria) Francis Uzoho
- (Norway) Jan Berg
- (Paraguay) Roberto Acuña
- (Paraguay) Florencio Amarilla
- (Paraguay) José Aveiro
- (Paraguay) Juan Casco
- (Paraguay) Ramón Hicks
- (Paraguay) Juan Carlos Lezcano
- (Paraguay) Cayetano Ré
- (Paraguay) Derlis Soto
- (Peru) Germán Leguía
- (Peru) Juan Carlos Oblitas
- (Poland) Tomasz Frankowski
- (Poland) Antoni Łukasiewicz
- (Poland) Przemysław Tytoń
- (Portugal) Silas
- (Romania) Ioan Andone
- (Romania) Cristian Săpunaru
- (Romania) Dennis Şerban
- (Serbia) Albert Nadj
- (Serbia) Saša Petrović
- (Spain) Juan Manuel Asensi
- (Spain) Rubén Cano
- (Spain) Chancho
- (Spain) Fidel
- (Spain) Gonzalo Verdú
- (Spain) Josan
- (Spain) Carlos Muñoz
- (Spain) Javi Navarro
- (Spain) Nino
- (Spain) Jorge Otero
- (Spain) Marcial Pina
- (Spain) César Rodríguez
- (Spain) Hilario
- (Spain) (Paraguay) Eulogio Martínez
- (Uruguay) Fabián Coelho
- (Uruguay) Dagoberto Moll
- (Uruguay) Mario Saralegui
- (Uruguay) Tabaré Silva
- (Venezuela) Juan Carlos Socorro
- (Venezuela) Andrés Túñez
- (Socialist Federal Republic of Yugoslavia) Goran Đorović
- (Colombia) Carlos Sánchez

== Coaches ==
- (Spain) César (1959 – 30 June 1960)
- (Spain) Antonio Barrios (1 July 1960 – 6 February 1961)
- (Brazil) Otto Bumbel (1962–63)
- (Paraguay) Heriberto Herrera (1 July 1963 – 30 June 1964)
- (Spain) Rosendo Hernández (1964)
- (Brazil) Martim Francisco (1964–65)
- (Brazil) Otto Bumbel (1965–67)
- (Argentina) (Spain) Alfredo Di Stéfano (1 July 1967 – 8 January 1968)
- (Czechoslovakia) Ferdinand Daučík (1968)
- (Uruguay) Roque Máspoli (1 July 1968 – 31 December 1969)
- (Spain) Salvador Artigas (1970)
- (Brazil) Otto Bumbel (1970–71)
- (Argentina) Roque Olsen (1971–74)
- (Argentina) Néstor Rossi (1974–75)
- (France) Marcel Domingo (1975–76)
- (Argentina) Felipe Mesones (1976–77)
- (Argentina) Roque Olsen (1977–78)
- (Paraguay) Heriberto Herrera (1 July 1978 – 30 June 1979)
- (Spain) Arsenio Iglesias (1979–80)
- (Spain) Héctor Rial (1980)
- (Argentina) Felipe Mesones (1981–82)
- (Spain) Luis Cid (1982–83)
- (Paraguay) Cayetano Ré (1983–84)
- (Spain) Antonio Ruiz (1984)
- (Argentina) Roque Olsen (1984–85)
- (Spain) Delfín Álvarez (1986–87)
- (Argentina) Felipe Mesones (1987–88)
- (Hungary) (Spain) (Czechoslovakia) László Kubala (1988–89)
- (Spain) Luis Costa (1989)
- (Spain) Tomeu Llompart (1991–92)
- (Spain) Julián Rubio (1 July 1993 – 30 June 1994)
- (Spain) Quique Hernández (19 July 1994 – 30 June 1995)
- (Argentina) Felipe Mesones (1995–96)
- (Spain) Fabri (1996)
- (Spain) Marcial (1996–97)
- (Spain) Ciriaco Cano (1997–98)
- (Spain) Delfín Álvarez (1997–98)
- (Argentina) Jorge D'Alessandro (25 January 2000 – 30 June 2000)
- (Argentina) Felipe Mesones (2000)
- (Spain) Marcial (2000)
- (Argentina) Jorge D'Alessandro (21 December 2000 – 16 April 2001)
- (Spain) Marcial (2001)
- (Spain) Julián Rubio (1 July 2001 – 30 June 2003)
- (Spain) Carlos García Cantarero (2003)
- (Argentina) Oscar Ruggeri (22 December 2003 – 16 May 2004)
- (Spain) Josu Uribe (2004–06)
- (Spain) Julián Rubio (2006)
- (Spain) Luis García (1 July 2006 – 30 June 2007)
- (Spain) David Vidal (12 January 2007 – 12 October 2008)
- (Spain) Claudio Barragán (12 October 2008 – 4 October 2009)
- (Spain) José Bordalás (5 October 2009 – 8 April 2012)
- (Spain) César Ferrando (10 April 2012 – 30 June 2012)
- (Spain) Fran Escribá (1 July 2012 – 26 June 2015)
- (Spain) Rubén Baraja (12 July 2015 – 6 June 2016)
- (Spain) Alberto Toril (28 June 2016 – 29 April 2017)
- (Spain) Vicente Parras (29 April 2017 – 16 June 2017)
- (Spain) Vicente Mir (16 June 2017 – 13 November 2017)
- (Argentina) José Acciari (13 November 2017 – 21 November 2017)
- (Spain) Josico (21 November 2017 – 27 February 2018)
- (Spain) Pacheta (27 February 2018 – 26 August 2020)
- (Argentina) Jorge Almirón (26 August 2020 – 12 February 2021)
- (Spain) Fran Escribá (14 February 2021 – 21 November 2021)
- (Spain) Francisco (28 November 2021 – 4 October 2022)
- (Argentina) Jorge Almirón (12 October 2022 – 7 November 2022)
- (Spain) Pablo Machín (17 November 2022 – 20 March 2023)
- (Argentina) Sebastián Beccacece (27 March 2023 – 1 July 2024)
- (Spain) Eder Sarabia (2 July 2024 – )

== Reserve team ==
Elche's reserve team, Elche Ilicitano, was founded in 1932. It managed to spend two seasons in the second division, when the main squad was in the top flight.

== Rivalries ==
Elche CF and Hércules CF have been fierce rivals for a long time. Their rivalry, known as the Derbi de la provincia de Alicante, began way back in the 1925/26 season when Elche CF joined the official regional league. Since then, these teams have clashed over a hundred times. The rivalry between Elche CF and Real Murcia CF is a historical one. Their first official match was during the 1928–29 season. Their frequent meetings, known as the Derbi del Sureste (Southeast Derby), make this fixture the most played in the history of the Segunda División.

Another of the most notable rivalries is with Levante UD. These teams have a long history of intense regional competition across various divisions, including Primera, Segunda, and Segunda B, creating a fierce atmosphere both on the pitch and in the stands. Elche CF's rivalries with Hércules and Real Murcia stem from regional proximity, while their rivalry with Levante developed over numerous competitive clashes. The rivalry with Granada CF ignited during the tense 2010-11 Segunda División season, culminating in the Play-off final.

== Kit suppliers and shirt sponsors ==
Period	Kit manufacturer	Shirt sponsors
1997-1998	Kelme	None
2001-2002	Puma	Terra Mítica
2004-2006	Puma	Ciudad de la Luz
2010-2011	Rasan	Valencian Community
2011-2012	Acerbis	Valencian Community
2012-2014	Acerbis	Gioseppo
2014-2015	Kelme	Gioseppo
2015-2017	Kelme	None
2017-2018	Kelme	TM Real Estate Group
2018-2019	Kelme	None
2019-2021	Hummel	TM Real Estate Group
2021-	Nike	TM Real Estate Group

== See also ==
- Playars of Elche CF (in Spanish)
