= 1960–61 Inter Milan season =

Inter Milan
1960–61 season
- Owner: Angelo Moratti
- President: Angelo Moratti
- Manager: Helenio Herrera
- Stadium: San Siro
- Serie A: 3rd (in 1961–62 Inter-Cities Fairs Cup)
- Coppa Italia: Quarterfinals
- Top goalscorer: League: Eddie Firmani (16); All: Firmani (18)
Home colours	Away colours

During the 1960–61 season Inter Milan competed in Serie A and Coppa Italia.

== Summary ==
During summer oil tycoon and President Angelo Moratti in his sixth campaign as Chairman appointed Italo Allodi as the first ever club general manager. Also, new arrivals are confirmed for the season such as: Goalkeeper Lorenzo Buffon, Defender Costanzo Balleri and midfielders Armando Picchi and Egidio Morbello along with Argentine Helenio Herrera as new head coach transferred in from Spain clinching the first league spot during several rounds, however, the squad collapsed in the final matches to a decent 3rd place at the end of the season.

Meanwhile, in Coppa Italia the team advanced to the quarterfinals only to be eliminated by SS Lazio.

== Squad ==
Source: Note: Flags indicate national team as defined under FIFA eligibility rules; some limited exceptions apply. Players may hold more than one non-FIFA nationality.

Pos.	Nation	Player
GK	ITA	Lorenzo Buffon
GK	ITA	Mario Da Pozzo
DF	ITA	Aristide Guarneri
DF	ITA	Mauro Gatti
DF	ITA	Costanzo Balleri
DF	ITA	Livio Fongaro
DF	ITA	Giacinto Facchetti
DF	ITA	Roberto Manini
MF	SWE	Bengt Lindskog
MF	ITA	Mauro Bicicli

Pos.	Nation	Player
MF	ITA	Armando Picchi
MF	ITA	Egidio Morbello
MF	ITA	Bruno Bolchi
MF	ITA	Franco Zaglio
MF	ITA	Enea Masiero
FW	ITA	Mario Corso
FW	RSA	Eddie Firmani
FW	ARG	Antonio Angelillo
FW	ITA	Luigi Mascalaito
FW	ITA	Sandro Mazzola

=== Transfers ===
In
Pos.	Name	from	Type
GK	Lorenzo Buffon	Genoa	
MF	Armando Picchi	SPAL	
MF	Franco Zaglio	AS Roma	
GK	Mario Da Pozzo	Catanzaro	

Out
Pos.	Name	To	Type
MF	Giovanni Invernizzi	Torino	
GK	Enzo Matteucci	SPAL	
MF	Arcadio Venturi	Brescia	
DF	Amos Cardarelli	Lecco	
MF	Orazio Rancati	Genoa	
MF	Vasco Tagliavini	Udinese	
GK	Walter Pontel	Catania	
DF	Mario Mereghetti	Udinese	

==== Winter ====
In
Pos.	Name	from	Type
DF	Costanzo Balleri	Torino	
MF	Egidio Morbello	SPAL	

Out
Pos.	Name	To	Type

== Competitions ==
=== Serie A ===
==== League table ====
Pos	Team	Pld	W	D	L	GF	GA	GD	Pts	Qualification or relegation
1	Juventus (C)	34	22	5	7	80	42	+38	49	Qualified for the European Cup
2	Milan	34	18	9	7	65	39	+26	45	Invited for the Inter-Cities Fairs Cup
3	Internazionale	34	18	8	8	73	39	+34	44	Invited for the Inter-Cities Fairs Cup
4	Sampdoria	34	17	7	10	54	51	+3	41	
5	Roma (Note: Roma qualified as holders.)	34	16	7	11	58	46	+12	39	Invited for the Inter-Cities Fairs Cup

Source: Panini
(C) Champions

==== Results by round ====
Round	1	2	3	4	5	6	7	8	9	10	11	12	13	14	15	16	17	18	19	20	21	22	23	24	25	26	27	28	29	30	31	32	33	34	35
Ground	A	H	A	H	A	H	A	H	H	A	H	H	A	A	H	A	H	H	A	H	A	H	A	H	H	A	H	A	A	H	H	A	H	A	A
Result	W	W	W	W	D	D	L	W	W	L	W	W	W	D	W	D	W	W	D	W	W	W	L	L	L	L	D	P	W	D	D	W	W	L	L
Position	1	1	1	1	1	1	2	2	2	2	2	1	1	1	1	1	1	1	1	1	1	1	1	1	2	3	3	3	3	2	3	2	2	3	3

Source: http://calcio-seriea.net/allenatori_squadra/1960/501/
A = Away; H = Home; W = Win; D = Draw; L = Loss; = Leader, European Cup; = Invited to 1961–62 Inter-Cities Fairs Cup; = Relegation to 1961–62 Serie B

==== Matches ====
- .-Source:http://calcio-seriea.net/partite/1960/501/

25 September 1960 1	Atalanta	1–5	Inter	Bergamo
	Magistrelli 69'	Report	20', 40', 46' Firmani; 45' Angelillo; 52' Corso	Stadium: Comunale; Referee: Adami

2 October 1960 2	Inter	2–1	Bari	Milan
	Firmani 4'; Lindskog 49' (pen.)	Report	89' Virgili	Stadium: San Siro; Referee: Angonese

9 October 1960 3	Udinese	0–6	Inter	Udine
		Report	24', 44' Lindskog; 37', 43' Angelillo; 56' Zaglio; 61' Firmani	Stadium: Moretti; Referee: Jonni

16 October 1960 4	Inter	5–0	Lanerossi Vicenza	Milan
	Zaglio 15'; Bolchi 48', 83'; Angelillo 78', 80'	Report		Stadium: San Siro; Referee: Di Tonno (Lecce)

23 October 1960 5	SS Lazio	0–0	Inter	Rome
		Report		Stadium: Olimpico; Referee: Babini

6 November 1960 6	Inter	1–1	Lecco	Milan
	Angelillo 13'	Report	60' Gilardoni	Stadium: San Siro; Referee: Leita

13 November 1960 7	Padova	2–1	Inter	Padua
	Milani 56'; Tortul 61'	Report	11' Masiero	Stadium: Silvio Appiani; Referee: Jonni (Macerata)

20 November 1960 8	AC Milan	0–1	Inter	Milan
		Report	44' Picchi	Stadium: San Siro; Referee: Adami

27 November 1960 9	Inter	3–0	Sampdoria	Milan
	Firmani 37'; Bicicli 74'; Angelillo 76'	Report		Stadium: San Siro; Referee: Jonni

4 December 1960 10	Bologna	2–1	Inter	Bologna
	Perani 58'; Vinicio 60'	Report	31' Lindskog	Stadium: Renato Dall'Ara; Referee: De Marchi

18 December 1960 11	Inter	3–1	Juventus	Milan
	Corso 28'; Morbello 50'; Firmani 69'	Report	77' Mora	Stadium: San Siro; Referee: Adami

25 December 1960 12	Inter	4–1	SPAL	Milan
	Lindskog 47'; Corso 50', 63'; Firmani 65'	Report	38' Novelli	Stadium: San Siro; Referee: Gambarotta

1 January 1961 13	Torino	0–1	Inter	Turin
		Report	41' Corso	Stadium: Filadelfia; Referee: Rigato

8 January 1961 14	Fiorentina	1–1	Inter	Florence
	Da Costa 52'	Report	74' (pen.) Lindskog	Stadium: Comunale; Referee: Lo Bello

15 January 1961 15	Inter	3–1	AS Roma	Milan
	Pestrin 46' (o.g.); Corso 62'; Firmani 65'	Report	37' Schiaffino	Stadium: San Siro; Referee: Rigato

22 January 1961 16	SSC Napoli	0–0	Inter	Naples
		Report		Stadium: San Paolo; Referee: Jonni (Macerata)

29 January 1961 17	Inter	5–0	Catania	Milan
	Morbello 13'; Giavara 30', 42' (o.g.); Grani 69' (o.g.); Corti 81' (o.g.)	Report		Stadium: San Siro; Referee: Gambarotta

5 February 1961 18	Inter	2–1	Atalanta	Milan
	Firmani 16', 72'	Report	84' (o.g.) Picchi	Stadium: San Siro; Referee: De Marchi

12 February 1961 19	Bari	1–1	Inter	Bari
	Rossano 62'	Report	70' Bicicli	Stadium: della Vittoria; Referee: Jonni

19 February 1961 20	Inter	1–0	Udinese	Milan
	Lindskog 1'	Report		Stadium: San Siro; Referee: Roversi

26 February 1961 21	Lanerossi Vicenza	1–3	Inter	Vicenza
	Gatti 85' (o.g.)	Report	11', 32' Bolchi; 80' Corso	Stadium: Romeo Menti; Referee: Gambarotta

5 March 1961 22	Inter	7–0	SS Lazio	Milan
	Firmani 43', 66', 67', 87'; Gatti 62'; Angelillo 71'; Morbello 79'	Report		Stadium: San Siro; Referee: Di Tonno

12 March 1961 23	Lecco	2–1	Inter	Lecco
	Gilardoni 15', 76'	Report	86' Balleri	Stadium: Mario Rigamonti; Referee: Jonni

19 March 1961 24	Inter	1–2	Padova	Milan
	Gatti 80'	Report	72' (pen.), 90' Milani	Stadium: San Siro; Referee: Roversi

26 March 1961 25	Inter	1–2	AC Milan	Milan
	Lindskog 51' (pen.)	Report	1' Altafini; 15' Liedholm	Stadium: San Siro; Referee: Rigato

2 April 1961 26	Sampdoria	4–2	Inter	Genoa
	Brighenti 14', 53', 86', 88'	Report	37' Corso; 76' Zaglio	Stadium: Luigi Ferraris; Referee: De Marchi

9 April 1961 27	Inter	0–0	Bologna	Milan
		Report		Stadium: San Siro; Referee: Francescon

16 April 1961 28	Juventus	v	Inter	Turin
		Report		Stadium: Comunale; Referee: Gambarotta
Note: Match suspended at 31' by referee Carlo Gambarotta due to field invasion by fans with score (0–0).

30 April 1961 29	SPAL	1–3	Inter	Ferrara
	Massei 13'	Report	37' (o.g.) Rota; 53' Morbello; 70' Lindskog	Stadium: Comunale; Referee: Adami

7 May 1961 30	Inter	1–1	Torino	Milan
	Firmani 76'	Report	56' Mazzero	Stadium: San Siro; Referee: Jonni

14 May 1961 31	Inter	2–2	Fiorentina	Milan
	Corso 32'; Lindskog 38'	Report	67' Da Costa; 82' Hamrin	Stadium: San Siro; Referee: Adami

21 May 1961 32	AS Roma	0–2	Inter	Rome
		Report	12' Bolchi; 56' Morbello	Stadium: Olimpico; Referee: Gambarotta

30 May 1961 33	Inter	3–0	SSC Napoli	Milan
	Facchetti 44'; Corso 69'; Bolchi 88'	Report		Stadium: San Siro; Referee: Jonni

4 June 1961 34	Catania	2–0	Inter	Catania
	Castellazzi 25'; Calvanese 70'	Report		Stadium: Cibali; Referee: De Marchi

10 June 1961 28	Juventus	9–1	Inter	Turin
	Sívori 11', 12', 17', 54', 67', 90' (pen.) Riefolo 52' (o.g.) Nicolè 64' Mora 79'	Report	78' Mazzola	Stadium: Comunale; Referee: Gambarotta
Note: Match suspended on 16 April 1961. After meetings National League awarded (0–2) on table in 24 April 1961. Juventus appealed to the Federal Justice Court which on 3 June 1961 sentenced to replay the game on 10 June 1961. However Inter sent a youth team to replay the game rejecting the sentence.

=== Coppa Italia ===
==== Second round ====
18 September 1960	Parma	1–3	Inter	Parma
	Giurini 87'		11' Angelillo; 24', 67' Firmani	Stadium: Il Tardini; Referee: De Marchi

==== Eightfinals ====
15 March 1961	Inter	7–1	Brescia	Milan
	Picchi 15'; Corso 31'; Morbello 37', 40', 46'; Bicicli 67', 85'		4' Baffi	Stadium: San Siro; Referee: D'Agostini

==== Quarterfinals ====
5 April 1961	Inter	0–1	SS Lazio	Milan
			10' Morrone	Stadium: San Siro; Attendance: 15,000; Referee: Angonese

== Statistics ==
=== Players statistics ===
No.	Pos	Nat	Player	Total		1960-61 Serie A	
No.	Pos	Nat	Player	Apps	Goals	Apps	Goals
	GK	(Italy) ITA	Lorenzo Buffon	30	-28	30	-28
	DF	(Italy) ITA	Aristide Guarneri	33	0	33	0
	DF	(Italy) ITA	Mauro Gatti	22	2	22	2
	DF	(Italy) ITA	Costanzo Balleri	26	1	26	1
	MF	(Sweden) SWE	Bengt Lindskog	33	10	33	10
	MF	(Italy) ITA	Mauro Bicicli	31	2	31	2
	MF	(Italy) ITA	Armando Picchi	30	1	30	1
	MF	(Italy) ITA	Egidio Morbello	24	5	24	5
	MF	(Italy) ITA	Bruno Bolchi	29	6	29	6
	FW	(Italy) ITA	Mario Corso	31	10	31	10
	FW	(South Africa) RSA	Eddie Firmani	28	16	28	16
	GK	(Italy) ITA	Mario Da Pozzo	3	-2	3	-2
	FW	(Argentina) ARG	Antonio Angelillo	15	8	15	8
	DF	(Italy) ITA	Livio Fongaro	13	0	13	0
	MF	(Italy) ITA	Franco Zaglio	6	3	6	3
	DF	(Italy) ITA	Giacinto Facchetti	3	1	3	1
	MF	(Italy) ITA	Enea Masiero	3	1	3	1
	FW	(Italy) ITA	Luigi Mascalaito	2	0	2	0
	FW	(Italy) ITA	Sandro Mazzola	1	1	1	1
	GK	(Italy) ITA	Antonio Annibale	1	-9	1	-9
	DF	(Italy) ITA	Roberto Manini	1	0	1	0
		(Italy) ITA	Remo Bicchierai	1	0	1	0
		(Italy) ITA	Franco Dal Maso	1	0	1	0
		(Italy) ITA	Antonio Fusari	1	0	1	0
		(Italy) ITA	Roberto Ghelli	1	0	1	0
		(Italy) ITA	Claudio Guglielmoni	1	0	1	0
		(Italy) ITA	Franco Masetto	1	0	1	0
		(Italy) ITA	Giuseppe Morosi	1	0	1	0
		(Italy) ITA	Francesco Riefolo	1	0	1	0
		(Italy) ITA	Roberto Tacchini	1	0	1	0

- Source: http://calcio-seriea.net/presenze/1960/501/
