= 1961–62 Inter Milan season =

Inter Milan
1961–62 season
- Owner: Angelo Moratti
- President: Angelo Moratti
- Manager: Helenio Herrera
- Stadium: San Siro
- Serie A: 2nd
- Coppa Italia: Eightfinals
- Top goalscorer: League: Gerry Hitchens (16); All: Hitchens (18)
Home colours	Away colours

During the 1961–62 season Inter Milan competed in Serie A, Coppa Italia and the Inter-Cities Fairs Cup.

== Summary ==
During summer oil tycoon and President Angelo Moratti in his 7th campaign as chairman transferred in several players to reinforce the club such as: Welsh forward Gerry Hitchens from Aston Villa and Spanish midfielder Luis Suarez from FC Barcelona after paid 25 million Spanish pesetas (£152,000).

Hitchens arrived to the team after a failed bid on Scottish Forward Denis Law who moved to Torino for a fee of £110,000, (Note: This was roughly equivalent to £1.65 million at 2004 values, according to the retail price conversion utility at measuringworth.com.) (a record fee for a transfer involving a British player) included claims by Inter Milan that he had signed a pre-contract agreement with them, although they dropped this claim before the season started.

The club finished in 2nd place just 5 points below of league Champions AC Milan. In Coppa Italia the team was early eliminated by Novara in Eightfinals. In the Inter-Cities Fairs Cup the squad advanced to the quarterfinals and lost the series to Valencia CF.

== Squad ==
Note: Flags indicate national team as defined under FIFA eligibility rules; some limited exceptions apply. Players may hold more than one non-FIFA nationality.

Pos.	Nation	Player
GK	ITA	Lorenzo Buffon
GK	ITA	Ottavio Bugatti
DF	ITA	Aristide Guarneri
DF	ITA	Costanzo Balleri
DF	ITA	Giacinto Facchetti
DF	ITA	Remo Bicchierai
DF	ITA	Luigi Caloi
DF	ITA	Giorgio Dellagiovanna
MF	ITA	Giorgio Brigo
MF	ITA	Guido Gratton
MF	ITA	Mauro Bicicli
MF	ITA	Armando Picchi

Pos.	Nation	Player
MF	ESP	Luis Suárez
MF	ITA	Egidio Morbello
MF	ITA	Bruno Bolchi
MF	ITA	Franco Zaglio
MF	ITA	Enea Masiero
MF	ITA	Sandro Mazzola
FW	ITA	Mario Corso
FW	ITA	Lorenzo Bettini
FW	ITA	Mario Mereghetti
FW	ITA	Bruno Petroni
FW	POR	Humberto
FW	WAL	Gerry Hitchens

=== Transfers ===
In
Pos.	Name	from	Type
FW	Lorenzo Bettini	Udinese	
FW	Gerry Hitchens	Aston Villa	
MF	Luis Suárez	FC Barcelona	
FW	Mario Mereghetti	Udinese	loan ended
GK	Ottavio Bugatti	SSC Napoli	
FW	Humberto	Academica	
MF	Guido Gratton	SSC Napoli	

Out
Pos.	Name	To	Type
DF	Mauro Gatti	SSC Napoli	
MF	Bengt Lindskog	Lecco	
FW	Eddie Firmani	Genoa	
GK	Mario Da Pozzo	Genoa	
FW	Antonio Angelillo	AS Roma	
DF	Livio Fongaro	Genoa	
FW	Luigi Mascalaito	US Catanzaro	

==== Winter ====
In
Pos.	Name	from	Type

Out
Pos.	Name	To	Type
MF	Guido Gratton	SS Lazio	

== Competitions ==
=== Serie A ===
==== League table ====
Pos	Team	Pld	W	D	L	GF	GA	GD	Pts	Qualification or relegation
1	Milan (C)	34	24	5	5	83	36	+47	53	Qualified for the European Cup
2	Internazionale	34	19	10	5	59	31	+28	48	
3	Fiorentina	34	19	8	7	57	32	+25	46	
4	Bologna	34	19	7	8	57	41	+16	45	
5	Roma	34	18	8	8	61	35	+26	44	Invited for the Inter-Cities Fairs Cup

Source: Panini
(C) Champions

==== Results by round ====
Round	1	2	3	4	5	6	7	8	9	10	11	12	13	14	15	16	17	18	19	20	21	22	23	24	25	26	27	28	29	30	31	32	33	34
Ground	H	A	H	A	H	A	H	H	A	A	H	A	H	A	H	H	A	A	H	A	H	A	H	H	A	H	H	A	H	A	H	A	A	H
Result	W	W	D	D	W	W	L	W	W	W	W	D	W	D	W	D	W	W	L	D	W	L	W	W	L	W	D	L	D	D	D	W	W	W
Position	1	1	1	2	1	1	1	1	1	1	1	1	1	1	1	1	1	1	1	1	1	1	1	1	2	1	2	3	2	3	3	3	2	2

Source: http://calcio-seriea.net/allenatori_squadra/1960/501/
A = Away; H = Home; W = Win; D = Draw; L = Loss; = Leader, European Cup; = Registered to 1962 Mitropa Cup; = Invited to 1962–63 Inter-Cities Fairs Cup; = Relegation to 1962–63 Serie B

==== Matches ====
27 August 1961 1	Inter	6–0	Atalanta	Milan
15:30 CEST	Corso 22'; Hitchens 28', 43'; Bettini 30', 79'; Suárez 70'			Stadium: San Siro; Referee: Di Tonno

3 September 1961 2	Roma	2–3	Inter	Rome
15:30 CEST	Pestrin 54'; Manfredini 66' (pen.)		13' Hitchens; 58' Suárez; 70' Bettini	Stadium: Olimpico; Referee: Gambarotta

10 September 1961 3	Inter	0–0	Torino	Milan
15:30 CEST				Stadium: San Siro; Referee: Francescon

13 September 1961 4	Mantova	1–1	Inter Milan	Mantua
18:00 CEST	Sormani 3'		90' Bettini	Stadium: Martelli; Referee: Sbardella

17 September 1961 5	Inter	4–1	Fiorentina	Milan
15:30 CEST	Corso 13'; Suárez 30' (pen.); Hitchens 39', 76'		88' (o.g.) Picchi	Stadium: San Siro; Referee: Gambarotta

24 September 1961 6	Padova	0–2	Inter Milan	Padova
15:30 CEST			36', 89' Corso	Stadium: Stadio Silvio Appiani; Referee: Lo Bello

1 October 1961 7	Inter	1–3	AC Milan	Milan
15:30 CEST	Suárez 70'		18' Pivatelli; 53' Greaves; 86' Conti	Stadium: San Siro; Referee: Bonetto (Torino)

4 October 1961 8	Inter	2–1	SPAL	Milan
18:30 CET	Bolchi 68', 87'		41' Gori	Stadium: San Siro; Referee: De Marchi

8 October 1961 9	Udinese	0–1	Inter Milan	Udine
15:30 CET			4' Hitchens	Stadium: Moretti; Referee: Jonni

22 October 1961 10	Juventus	2–4	Inter Milan	Turin
15:30 CET	Charles 19'; Nicolè 70'		14' Hitchens; 58' (pen.) Suárez; 74', 88' Bettini	Stadium: Comunale; Referee: Lo Bello

29 October 1961 11	Inter	1–0	Palermo	Milan
15:30 CET	Corso 28' (pen.)			Stadium: San Siro; Referee: Marchese

12 November 1961 12	Sampdoria	0–0	Inter	Genoa
15:30 CET				Stadium: Marassi; Referee: Adami

19 November 1961 13	Inter	2–1	Lanerossi Vicenza	Milan
15:30 CET	Hitchens 23'; Corso 26'		71' Puia	Stadium: San Siro; Referee: Sebastio

26 November 1961 14	Venezia	1–1	Inter	Venice
15:30	Raffin 62'		30' Bettini	Stadium: Penzo; Referee: Jonni

3 December 1961 15	Inter	6–4	Bologna	Milan
15:30 CET	Hitchens 22' (pen.), 60' (pen.); Bettini 36'; Masiero 43'; Morbello 71', 86'		8' Vinicio; 37', 54' Pascutti; 42' (pen.) Renna	Stadium: San Siro; Referee: Adami

10 December 1961 16	Inter	1–1	Catania	Milan
15:30 CET	Guarneri 6'		68' Prenna	Stadium: San Siro; Referee: De Marchi

17 December 1961 17	Lecco	0–1	Inter Milan	Lecco
15:30 CET			44' Bettini	Stadium: Rigamonti-Ceppi; Referee: Bonetto

24 December 1961 18	Atalanta	2–3	Inter Milan	Bergamo
14:00 CET	Maschio 50', 58' (pen.)		9' Bicicli; 33' Dellagiovanna; 59' Suárez	Stadium: Comunale; Referee: Gambarotta

31 December 1961 19	Inter	0–1	AS Roma	Milan
14:00 CET			81' Manfredini	Stadium: San Siro; Referee: Lo Bello

7 January 1962 20	Torino	0–0	Inter	Turin
14:00 CET				Stadium: Comunale; Referee: Gambarotta

14 January 1962 21	Inter	2–0	Mantova	Milan
14:00 CET	Hitchens 24'; Morbello 48'			Stadium: San Siro; Referee: De Robbio

21 January 1962 22	Fiorentina	4–1	Inter Milan	Florence
14:00 CET	Milani 20', 44', 57'; Bartù 45'		80' (pen.) Suárez	Stadium: Comunale; Referee: Adami

28 January 1962 23	Inter	2–1	Padova	Milan
14:00 CET	Hitchens 1'; Suárez 27' (pen.)		69' Del Vecchio	Stadium: San Siro; Referee: Bonetto (Turin)

4 February 1962 24	AC Milan	0–2	Inter Milan	Milan
14:00 CET			39' Morbello; 89' Suárez	Stadium: San Siro; Referee: Adami

11 February 1962 25	SPAL	1–0	Inter Milan	Ferrara
14:00 CET	Mencacci 5'			Stadium: Paolo Mazza; Referee: Gambarotta

18 February 1962 26	Inter	2–0	Udinese	Milan
14:00 CET	Hitchens 19'; Tagliavini 85' (o.g.)			Stadium: San Siro; Referee: De Robbio

25 February 1962 27	Inter	2–2	Juventus	Milan
14:00 CET	Bicicli 12'; Hitchens 75'		79' Sivori; 87' Stacchini	Stadium: San Siro; Referee: Jonni

4 March 1962 28	Palermo	1–0	Inter Milan	Palermo
15:30 CET	Fernando 67'			Stadium: La Favorita; Referee: Adami

11 March 1962 29	Inter	1–1	Sampdoria	Milan
15:30 CET	Suárez 78'		63' Delfino	Stadium: San Siro; Referee: Di Tonno

18 March 1962 30	Lanerossi Vicenza	1–1	Inter	Vicenza
15:30 CET	Campana 22'		3' (o.g.) Stenti	Stadium: Romeo Menti; Referee: Lo Bello

25 March 1962 31	Inter	0–0	Venezia	Milan
15:30 CET				Stadium: San Siro; Referee: Bonetto (Torino)

1 April 1962 32	Bologna	0–2	Inter Milan	Bologna
15:30 CET			55' Bicicli; 75' (pen.) Suárez	Stadium: Comunale; Referee: Rigato (Mestre)

8 April 1962 33	Catania	0–2	Inter Milan	Catania
15:30 CET			4' Hitchens; 78' Corso	Stadium: Cibali; Referee: De Marchi

15 April 1962 34	Inter	3–0	Lecco	Milan
15:30 CET	Corso 5', 49'; Hitchens 87'			Stadium: San Siro; Referee: Righetti

=== Coppa Italia ===
==== Eightfinals ====
25 April 1962	Inter	1–2 (a.e.t.)	Novara	Milan
16:00 CET	Humberto 85'		80' Fumagalli; 111' (pen.) Zeno	Stadium: San Siro; Referee: Varazzani

=== Inter-Cities Fairs Cup ===
==== Round of 32 ====
27 September 1961	1.FC Köln (West Germany)	4–2	(Italy) Inter	Cologne
	Sturm 2'; Müller 23'; Hemmersbach 36'; Thielen 71'		19' Morbello; 63' Petroni	Stadium: Müngersdorfer Stadion; Referee: (England) Finney

11 October 1961	Inter (Italy)	2–0	(West Germany) 1.FC Köln	Milan
	Suárez 4', 59' (pen.)			Stadium: San Siro; Referee: (Socialist Federal Republic of Yugoslavia) Skoric

25 October 1961	Inter (Italy)	5–3	(West Germany) 1.FC Köln	Milan
	Humberto 2', 32', 63'; Suárez 16'; Morbello 40'		42', 54' Regh; 73' Ripkens	Stadium: San Siro; Referee: (England) Kelly

==== Eightfinals ====
6 November 1961	Hearts (Scotland)	0–1	(Italy) Inter	Edinburgh
			33' Humberto	Stadium: Tynecastle Stadium; Referee: (England) Howley

22 November 1961	Inter (Italy)	4–0	(Scotland) Hearts	Milan
	Hitchens 11', 86'; Morbello 31'; Humberto 75'			Stadium: San Siro; Referee: (Spain) Caballero

==== Quarterfinals ====
14 February 1962	Valencia (Spain)	2–0	(Italy) Inter	Valencia
	Guillot 3'; Waldo 7'			Stadium: Estadio de Mestalla; Referee: (England) Finney

21 March 1962	Inter (Italy)	3–3	(Spain) Valencia CF	Milan
	Bettini 7', 52'; Suárez 23' (pen.)		3' Chicão; 34' Recaman; 86' Ficha	Stadium: San Siro; Referee: (Belgium) Versyp
Note: Inter Milan goalkeeper Lorenzo Buffon complained of an injury at halftime and was replaced by Ottavio Bugatti, substitutions were not officially allowed at the time.

== Statistics ==
=== Players statistics ===
No.	Pos	Nat	Player	Total		Serie A		Coppa		Fairs Cup	
No.	Pos	Nat	Player	Apps	Goals	Apps	Goals	Apps	Goals	Apps	Goals
	GK	(Italy) ITA	Lorenzo Buffon	31	-33	29	-28	0	-0	2	-5
	DF	(Italy) ITA	Aristide Guarneri	37	1	33	1	0	0	4	0
	DF	(Italy) ITA	Costanzo Balleri	27	0	19	0	1	0	7	0
	MF	(Italy) ITA	Mauro Bicicli	26	3	22	3	0	0	4	0
	MF	(Italy) ITA	Armando Picchi	33	0	29	0	1	0	3	0
	MF	(Italy) ITA	Bruno Bolchi	29	2	28	2	0	0	1	0
	MF	(Italy) ITA	Enea Masiero	35	1	29	1	1	0	5	0
	MF	(Spain) ESP	Luis Suárez	31	15	27	11	0	0	4	4
	FW	(Italy) ITA	Mario Corso	32	9	30	9	0	0	2	0
	FW	(Italy) ITA	Lorenzo Bettini	24	11	22	9	0	0	2	2
	FW	(Wales) WAL	Gerry Hitchens	37	18	34	16	0	0	3	2
	GK	(Italy) ITA	Ottavio Bugatti	11	-12	5	-3	1	-2	5	-7
	DF	(Italy) ITA	Giacinto Facchetti	21	0	15	0	0	0	6	0
	MF	(Italy) ITA	Mario Mereghetti	19	0	15	0	1	0	3	0
	MF	(Italy) ITA	Egidio Morbello	18	7	12	4	1	0	5	3
	MF	(Italy) ITA	Franco Zaglio	15	0	11	0	0	0	4	0
	DF	(Italy) ITA	Giorgio Dellagiovanna	12	1	8	1	1	0	3	0
	DF	(Italy) ITA	Remo Bicchierai	6	0	2	0	1	0	3	0
	FW	(Portugal) POR	Humberto	8	6	2	0	1	1	5	5
	FW	(Italy) ITA	Sandro Mazzola	1	0	1	0	0	0	0	0
	FW	(Italy) ITA	Bruno Petroni	5	1	1	0	1	0	3	1
	MF	(Italy) ITA	Guido Brigo	2	0	0	0	1	0	1	0
	DF	(Italy) ITA	Luigi Caloi	1	0	0	0	0	0	1	0
	MF	(Italy) ITA	Guido Gratton	1	0	0	0	0	0	1	0

- Source: http://calcio-seriea.net/presenze/1961/522/
