= 1961–62 Inter-Cities Fairs Cup =

Tournament details
- Dates: 13 September 1961 – 12 September 1962
- Teams: 28

Final positions
- Champions: (Spain) Valencia (1st title)
- Runners-up: (Spain) Barcelona

Tournament statistics
- Matches played: 55
- Goals scored: 221 (4.02 per match)
- Top scorer: (Brazil) Waldo (9 goals)

The fourth Inter-Cities Fairs Cup was played over the 1961–62 season. There were five representative teams for some major European cities, three of which lost out in the first round. The final was the first European final to be contested between two clubs from the same country, namely Spain. Valencia beat Barcelona 7–3 over two legs, and also reached the next two finals in the competition.

== Teams location ==
Location of teams in the 1961–62 Inter-Cities Fairs Cup.

== Bracket ==
First Round
(Spain) Valencia	2	5	7
(England) Nottingham Forest	0	1	1
(Belgium) Union Saint-Gilloise	1	0	1
(Scotland) Heart of Midlothian	3	2	5
(Germany) 1. FC Köln	4	0	4
(Italy) Inter Milan	2	2	4
(Italy) Milan	0	0	0
(Socialist Federal Republic of Yugoslavia) Novi Sad XI	0	2	2
(France) Strasbourg	1	2	3
(Hungary) MTK	3	10	13
(Czech Republic) Spartak Brno	2	1	3
(East Germany) Leipzig	2	4	6
(Germany) Hannover 96	0	0	0
(Spain) Espanyol	1	2	3
(Switzerland) Basel	1	1	2
(Socialist Federal Republic of Yugoslavia) Red Star Belgrade	1	4	5
(Scotland) Hibernian	3	3	6
(Portugal) Belenenses	3	1	4
(France) Lyon	4	2	6
(England) Sheffield Wednesday	2	5	7
(Germany) West Berlin	1	0	1
(Spain) Barcelona	0	3	3
(Denmark) Copenhagen XI	2	2	4
(Socialist Federal Republic of Yugoslavia) Dinamo Zagreb	7	2	9

Second round
(Switzerland) Lausanne	3	-	3
(Spain) Valencia	4	-	4
(Scotland) Heart of Midlothian	0	0	0
(Italy) Inter Milan	1	4	5
(Greece) Iraklis	2	1	3
(Socialist Federal Republic of Yugoslavia) Novi Sad	1	9	10
(Hungary) MTK	3	0	3
(East Germany) Leipzig	0	3	3
(Spain) Espanyol	5	0	5
(England) Birmingham	2	1	3
(Socialist Federal Republic of Yugoslavia) Red Star Belgrade	4	1	5
(Scotland) Hibernian	0	0	0
(England) Sheffield Wednesday	4	0	4
(Italy) Roma	0	1	1
(Spain) Barcelona	5	2	7
(Socialist Federal Republic of Yugoslavia) Dinamo Zagreb	1	2	3

Quarter-finals
(Spain) Valencia	2	3	5
(Italy) Inter Milan	0	3	3
(Socialist Federal Republic of Yugoslavia) Novi Sad	1	1	2
(Hungary) MTK	4	2	6
(Spain) Espanyol	2	0	2
(Socialist Federal Republic of Yugoslavia) Red Star Belgrade	1	5	6
(England) Sheffield Wednesday	3	0	3
(Spain) Barcelona	2	2	4

Semi-finals
(Spain) Valencia	3	7	10
(Hungary) MTK	0	3	3
(Socialist Federal Republic of Yugoslavia) Red Star Belgrade	0	1	1
(Spain) Barcelona	2	4	6

Final
(Spain) Valencia	6	1	7
(Spain) Barcelona	2	1	3

== First round ==
Team 1	Agg.	Team 2	1st leg	2nd leg
Lausanne-Sport (Switzerland)	bye	–	–	–
Valencia (Spain)	7–1	(England) Nottingham Forest	2–0	5–1
Union Saint-Gilloise (Belgium)	1–5	(Scotland) Heart of Midlothian	1–3	0–2
1. FC Köln (West Germany)	4–4^{1}	(Italy) Inter Milan	4–2	0–2
Iraklis (Greece)	bye	–	–	–
Milan (Italy)	0–2	(Socialist Federal Republic of Yugoslavia) Novi Sad XI	0–0	0–2
Strasbourg (France)	3–13	(Hungary) MTK	1–3	2–10
Spartak KPS Brno (Czechoslovakia)	3–6	(East Germany) Leipzig XI	2–2	1–4
Hannover 96 (West Germany)	0–3	(Spain) Espanyol	0–1	0–2
Birmingham City (England)	bye	–	–	–
Basel XI (Switzerland)	2–5	(Socialist Federal Republic of Yugoslavia) Red Star Belgrade	1–1	1–4
Hibernian (Scotland)	6–4	(Portugal) Belenenses	3–3	3–1
Lyon (France)	6–7	(England) Sheffield Wednesday	4–2	2–5
Roma (Italy)	bye	–	–	–
West Berlin XI (West Germany)	1–3	(Spain) Barcelona	1–0	0–3
Copenhagen XI (Denmark)	4–9	(Socialist Federal Republic of Yugoslavia) Dinamo Zagreb	2–7	2–2

^{1}Inter Milan progressed to the Second round after winning a play-off match 5–3.

=== First leg ===
13 September 1961

Valencia (Spain)	2–0	(England) Nottingham Forest
Waldo 15', 40'

Estadio Mestalla, Valencia
Attendance: 46,000
Referee: Joaquim Campos (Portugal)

27 September 1961

Union Saint-Gilloise (Belgium)	1–3	(Scotland) Heart of Midlothian
van Vaerenberg 19'	Report	Blackwood 22'; Davidson 30', 76'

Stade Joseph Marien, Brussels
Attendance: 4,000
Referee: Pieter P Roomer (Netherlands)

27 September 1961

1. FC Köln (West Germany)	4–2	(Italy) Inter Milan
Sturm 2'; C. Müller 23'; Hemmersbach 36'; Thielen 71'		Morbello 19'; Petroni 63'

Müngersdorfer Stadion, Cologne
Attendance: 31,000
Referee: Jim Finney (England)

30 August 1961

Milan (Italy)	0–0	(Socialist Federal Republic of Yugoslavia) Novi Sad XI

San Siro, Milan
Attendance: 15,000
Referee: Henri Faucheux (France)

13 September 1961

Strasbourg (France)	1–3	(Hungary) MTK
Lachot 73'	Report	Sándor 20'; Gonzalez 23' (o.g.); Kuti 90'

La Meinau, Strasbourg
Attendance: 20,000
Referee: Viktor Schicker (Switzerland)

27 September 1961

Spartak KPS Brno (Czechoslovakia)	2–2	(East Germany) Leipzig XI
Skejbal 9', 46' (pen.)		Trölitzsch 13', 44' (pen.)

Městský fotbalový stadion Srbská, Brno

13 September 1961

Hannover 96 (West Germany)	0–1	(Spain) Espanyol
	Report	Camps 52'

Niedersachsenstadion, Hanover
Attendance: 12,000
Referee: Jozef Casteleyn (Belgium)

4 September 1961

Basel XI (Switzerland)	1–1	(Socialist Federal Republic of Yugoslavia) Red Star Belgrade
Odermatt 8'		Maravić 32'

St. Jakob Stadium, Basel

4 September 1961

Hibernian (Scotland)	3–3	(Portugal) Belenenses
Fraser 47', 53'; Baird 60' (pen.)	Report	Matateu 13', 26'; Yauca 15'

Easter Road, Edinburgh
Attendance: 20,000
Referee: Kevin Howley (England)

12 September 1961

Lyon (France)	4–2	(England) Sheffield Wednesday
Rambert 19'; N'Jo Léa 22', 38'; Combin 90'		Young 48'; Ellis 63'

Stade de Gerland, Lyon

20 September 1961

West Berlin XI (West Germany)	1–0	(Spain) Barcelona
Steinert 83'

Olympiastadion, Berlin

7 September 1961

Copenhagen XI (Denmark)	2–7	(Socialist Federal Republic of Yugoslavia) Dinamo Zagreb
O. Sørensen 13'; Ravn 15'		Jerković 24'; Cvitković 33'; Jerković 41'; Cvitković 67'; Šantek 69'; Knez 88'; Matuš 90'

Idrætsparken, Copenhagen
Referee: Gerhard Schulenburg (Germany)

=== Second leg ===
4 October 1961

Nottingham Forest (England)	1–5	(Spain) Valencia
Cobb 53'		Waldo 11' 13'; Núñez 30' 49' 68'

City Ground, Nottingham
Attendance: 36,158
Referee: Robert Smith (Wales)

Valencia won 7–1 on aggregate.

4 October 1961

Heart of Midlothian (Scotland)	2–0	(Belgium) Union Saint-Gilloise
Wallace 70'; Stenhouse 87'

Tynecastle Park, Edinburgh

Heart of Midlothian won 5–1 on aggregate.

11 October 1961

Inter Milan (Italy)	2–0	(West Germany) 1. FC Köln
Suárez 4' 59' (pen.)

San Siro, Milan
Attendance: 21,000
Referee: Aleksandar Škorić (Yugoslavia)

Inter Milan 4–4 1. FC Köln on aggregate.

25 October 1961

Inter Milan (Italy)	5–3	(West Germany) 1. FC Köln
Humberto 2' 32' 63'; Suárez 16'; Morbello 40'		Regh 42' 54'; Ripkens 73'

San Siro, Milan
Attendance: 23,000
Referee: John Kelly (England)

Internazionale won 5–3 in play-off.

20 September 1961

Novi Sad XI (Socialist Federal Republic of Yugoslavia)	2–0	(Italy) Milan
Takač 20'; Pavlić 50'

Stadion Vojvodine, Novi Sad
Attendance: 15,000
Referee: Ernst Chebat (Austria)

Novi Sad XI won 2–0 on aggregate.

4 October 1961

MTK (Hungary)	10–2	(France) Strasbourg
Kuti 13' 60'; Sándor 17' 83'; Molnár 37' 69'; Szimcsák 47' 53' 68'; Sas 82'	Report	Nabat 21'; Hauss 75' (pen.)

Hidegkuti Nándor Stadium, Budapest
Attendance: 18,000
Referee: Adolf Mach (Czech Republic)

MTK won 13–3 on aggregate.

4 October 1961

Leipzig XI (East Germany)	4–1	(Czechoslovakia) Spartak KPS Brno
Frenzel 17' 21'; Zerbe 36' 51'		Skejbal 64'

Zentralstadion Leipzig

Leipzig XI won 6–3 on aggregate.

27 September 1961

Espanyol (Spain)	2–0	(West Germany) Hannover 96
Camps 27'; Jorss 61' (o.g.)

Estadi Olímpic Lluís Companys, Barcelona

Espanyol won 3–0 on aggregate.

27 September 1961

Red Star Belgrade (Socialist Federal Republic of Yugoslavia)	4–1	(Switzerland) Basel XI
Stipić 6'; Melić 42' 69'; Rudinski 60'		Blumer 23'

Stadion JNA Belgrade

Red Star won 5–2 on aggregate.

27 September 1961

Belenenses (Portugal)	1–3	(Scotland) Hibernian
Matateu 28'		Baxter 20' 61'; Stevenson 74'

Estádio do Restelo, Lisbon
Attendance: 25,000
Referee: Vicente Caballero Camacho (Spain)

Hibernian won 6–4 on aggregate.

4 October 1961

Sheffield Wednesday (England)	5–2	(France) Lyon
Fantham 9' 85'; Griffin 14'; McAnearney 20' (pen.); Dobson 78'	Report	Salen 6'; Djorkaeff 81'

Hillsborough Stadium, Sheffield
Referee: Arthur Crossman (Scotland)

Sheffield Wednesday won 7–6 on aggregate.

4 October 1961

Barcelona (Spain)	3–0	(West Germany) West Berlin XI
Evaristo 8' 75'; Zaldúa 90'

Camp Nou, Barcelona

Barcelona won 3–1 on aggregate.

4 October 1961

Dinamo Zagreb (Socialist Federal Republic of Yugoslavia)	2–2	(Denmark) Copenhagen XI
Remete 29'; Marković 70'		Rasmussen 31'; Andersen 40'

Stadion Maksimir, Zagreb

Dinamo Zagreb won 9–4 on aggregate.

== Second round ==
Team 1	Agg.	Team 2	1st leg	2nd leg
Lausanne-Sport (Switzerland)	3–4	(Spain) Valencia	3–4	–
Heart of Midlothian (Scotland)	0–5	(Italy) Inter Milan	0–1	0–4
Iraklis (Greece)	3–10	(Socialist Federal Republic of Yugoslavia) Novi Sad XI	2–1	1–9
MTK (Hungary)	3–3	(East Germany) Leipzig XI	3–0	0–3
Espanyol (Spain)	5–3	(England) Birmingham City	5–2	0–1
Red Star Belgrade (Socialist Federal Republic of Yugoslavia)	5–0	(Scotland) Hibernian	4–0	1–0
Sheffield Wednesday (England)	4–1	(Italy) Roma	4–0	0–1
Barcelona (Spain)	7–3	(Socialist Federal Republic of Yugoslavia) Dinamo Zagreb	5–1	2–2

^{1} MTK progressed to the quarter-finals after winning a play-off match 2–0.

=== First leg ===
6 November 1961

Heart of Midlothian (Scotland)	0–1	(Italy) Inter Milan
		Humberto 33'

Tynecastle Park, Edinburgh

26 October 1961

Iraklis (Greece)	2–1	(Socialist Federal Republic of Yugoslavia) Novi Sad XI
Xilas 9'; Asvestas 49'		Takač 43'

Kaftanzoglio Stadium, Thessaloniki

6 November 1961

MTK (Hungary)	3–0	(East Germany) Leipzig XI
Povázsai 37' 59'; Sándor 81'

Hidegkuti Nándor Stadium, Budapest

15 November 1961

Espanyol (Spain)	5–2	(England) Birmingham City
Castaños 22'; Carranza 25'; Camps 32' 80' 85'		Bloomfield 20'; Harris 75' (pen.)

Estadi Olímpic Lluís Companys, Barcelona

1 November 1961

Red Star Belgrade (Socialist Federal Republic of Yugoslavia)	4–0	(Scotland) Hibernian
Maravić 17' 55'; Melić 24'; Tasić 42'

Red Star Stadium, Belgrade

29 November 1961

Sheffield Wednesday (England)	4–0	(Italy) Roma
Fantham 6'; Young 33' 35' 79'

Hillsborough Stadium, Sheffield

13 December 1961

Barcelona (Spain)	5–1	(Socialist Federal Republic of Yugoslavia) Dinamo Zagreb
Pereda 15'; Evaristo 19' 28' 33'; Kocsis 68'		Jerković 87'

Camp Nou, Barcelona

=== Second leg ===
23 December 1961

Valencia (Spain)	4–3	(Switzerland) Lausanne-Sport
Ribelles 20' (pen.) 39'; Coll 54'; Waldo 81'		Vonlanden 48' (pen.); Glišović 62' 68'

Estadio Mestalla, Valencia

Valencia won 4–3 on aggregate.

22 November 1961

Inter Milan (Italy)	4–0	(Scotland) Heart of Midlothian
Hitchens 11' 86'; Morbello 31'; Humberto 75'

San Siro, Milan
Attendance: 12,000
Referee: Kevin Howley (England)

Inter Milan won 5–0 on aggregate.

15 November 1961

Novi Sad XI (Socialist Federal Republic of Yugoslavia)	9–1	(Greece) Iraklis
Radović 8' 46' 54'; Aleksić 23'; Pavlić 38' 57' 58'; Mijatović 55' 77'		Hasekidis 23'

Stadion Karađorđe, Novi Sad

Novi Sad XI won 10–3 on aggregate.

22 November 1961

Leipzig XI (East Germany)	3–0	(Hungary) MTK
Frenzel 18' 81'; Engelhardt 76'

Zentralstadion, Leipzig

Leipzig XI 3–3 MTK on aggregate.

30 November 1961

MTK (Hungary)	2–0	(East Germany) Leipzig XI
Sándor 39'; Bödör 57'

Hidegkuti Nándor Stadium, Budapest

MTK won 2–0 in play-off.

7 December 1961

Birmingham City (England)	1–0	(Spain) Espanyol
Auld 59'

St Andrew's, Birmingham

Espanyol won 5–3 on aggregate.

15 November 1961

Hibernian (Scotland)	0–1	(Socialist Federal Republic of Yugoslavia) Red Star Belgrade
		Prljinčević 77'

Easter Road, Edinburgh

Red Star won 5–0 on aggregate.

13 December 1961

Roma (Italy)	1–0	(England) Sheffield Wednesday
Swan 80' (o.g.)

Stadio Olimpico, Rome

Sheffield Wednesday won 4–1 on aggregate.

20 December 1961

Dinamo Zagreb (Socialist Federal Republic of Yugoslavia)	2–2	(Spain) Barcelona
Lamza 24' 47'		Evaristo 37'; Zaballa 69'

Stadion Maksimir, Zagreb

Barcelona won 7–3 on aggregate.

== Quarter-finals ==
Team 1	Agg.	Team 2	1st leg	2nd leg
Valencia (Spain)	5–3	(Italy) Inter Milan	2–0	3–3
Novi Sad XI (Socialist Federal Republic of Yugoslavia)	2–6	(Hungary) MTK	1–4	1–2
Espanyol (Spain)	2–6	(Socialist Federal Republic of Yugoslavia) Red Star Belgrade	2–1	0–5
Sheffield Wednesday (England)	3–4	(Spain) Barcelona	3–2	0–2

=== First leg ===
1 February 1962
20:30

Espanyol (Spain)	2–1	(Socialist Federal Republic of Yugoslavia) Red Star Belgrade
Camps 55' 77'		Stipić 12'

Estadi de Sarriá, Barcelona
Attendance: 30,000

11 February 1962

Novi Sad XI (Socialist Federal Republic of Yugoslavia)	1–4	(Hungary) MTK
Aleksić 22'		Bödör 35'; Kuti 55'; Vasas 75' 80'

Gradski Stadium, Novi Sad
Attendance: 20,000

14 February 1962

Valencia (Spain)	2–0	(Italy) Inter Milan
Guillot 3'; Waldo 7'

Estadio Mestalla, Valencia
Attendance: 56,000
Referee: Jim Finney (England)

28 February 1962

Sheffield Wednesday (England)	3–2	(Spain) Barcelona
Fantham 28' 50'; Finney 43'		Villaverde 14'; Evaristo 30'

Hillsborough Stadium, Sheffield
Attendance: 52,353

=== Second leg ===
18 February 1962

MTK (Hungary)	2–1	(Socialist Federal Republic of Yugoslavia) Novi Sad XI
Molnár 35'; Bödör 67'		Milić 10'

Hungária körúti stadion, Budapest
Attendance: 3,000

MTK won 6–2 on aggregate.

14 March 1962
19:30

Red Star Belgrade (Socialist Federal Republic of Yugoslavia)	5–0	(Spain) Espanyol
Šekularac 24' 56'; Muños 46' (o.g.); Galić 51'; Stipić 65'

JNA Stadium, Belgrade
Attendance: 20,000

Red Star Belgrade won 6–2 on aggregate.

21 March 1962

Inter Milan (Italy)	3–3	(Spain) Valencia
Bettini 7' 52'; Suárez 23' (pen.)		Chicão 3'; Recaman 34'; Ficha 86'

San Siro, Milan
Attendance: 20,000
Referee: Gérard Versyp (Belgium)

Internazionale goalkeeper Lorenzo Buffon complained of an injury at halftime and was replaced by Ottavio Bugatti, substitutions were not officially allowed at the time. Valencia won 5–3 on aggregate.

28 March 1962

Barcelona (Spain)	2–0	(England) Sheffield Wednesday
Evaristo 11'; Kocsis 23'

Camp Nou, Barcelona
Attendance: 75,000

Barcelona won 4–3 on aggregate. Barcelona advance to the Semi-Final

== Semifinals ==
Team 1	Agg.	Team 2	1st leg	2nd leg
Valencia (Spain)	10–3	(Hungary) MTK	3–0	7–3
Red Star Belgrade (Socialist Federal Republic of Yugoslavia)	1–6	(Spain) Barcelona	0–2	1–4

=== First leg ===
24 April 1962

Valencia (Spain)	3–0	(Hungary) MTK
Guillot 55'; Coll 69'; Waldo 73'

Estadio Mestalla, Valencia
Attendance: 50,000
Referee: Concetto Lo Bello (Italy)

=== Second leg ===
1 May 1962

MTK (Hungary)	3–7	(Spain) Valencia
Machos 28' 52'; Bödör 82'		Núñez 6' 60' 75'; Guillot 25' 46'; Waldo 32' 49'

Hidegkuti Nándor Stadium, Budapest
Attendance: 20,000
Referee: Albert Dusch (German)

Valencia won 10–3 on aggregate.

=== First leg ===
17 April 1962

Red Star Belgrade (Socialist Federal Republic of Yugoslavia)	0–2	(Spain) Barcelona
		Zaldúa 81'; Pereda 87'

JNA Stadium, Belgrade
Attendance: 20,000
Referee: Gottfried Dienst (Swiss)

=== Second leg ===
24 April 1962

Barcelona (Spain)	4–1	(Socialist Federal Republic of Yugoslavia) Red Star Belgrade
Kocsis 8'; Zaldúa 36' 70'; González 57' (pen.)		Maravic 27' (pen.)

Camp Nou, Barcelona
Attendance: 50,000
Referee: Ken Aston (England)

Barcelona won 6–1 on aggregate.

== Final ==
=== First leg ===
8 September 1962

Valencia (Spain)	6–2	(Spain) Barcelona
Yosu 14', 42'; Guillot 35', 54', 67'; Núñez 74'		Kocsis 4', 20'

Estadio Mestalla, Valencia
Attendance: 65,000
Referee: Joseph Barberan (France)

=== Second leg ===
12 September 1962

Barcelona (Spain)	1–1	(Spain) Valencia
Kocsis 46'		Guillot 87'

Camp Nou, Barcelona
Attendance: 60,000
Referee: Giulio Campanati (Italy)
