= Manini =

Manini may refer to:

- Acanthurus triostegus, a surgeonfish with common name Manini
- Don Francisco de Paula Marín (1774–1837), a Hawaiian horticulturist often called Manini or Marini

== People ==
=== Given name ===
- Manini Mishra, an Indian TV and film actress

=== Surname ===
- Fabrício Manini (1980–), a Brazilian footballer
- Giuseppe Manini
- Luigi Manini (1848–1936), a European architect
- Roberto Manini (1942–), a retired Italian football player

== Films ==
- Manini (1961 film), an Indian Marathi-language film
- Manini (1979 film), an Indian Kannada-language film
- Manini (1985 film), an Indian Odia-language film
- Manini (2004 film), an Indian Marathi-language film
