= 1959–60 Serie B =

Italian football league season

Serie B
- Season: 1959–60
- Champions: Torino; 1st title

Serie B 1959-60 team distribution

The Serie B 1959–60 was the twenty-eighth tournament of this competition played in Italy since its creation.

== Teams ==
Mantova and Catanzaro had been promoted from Serie C, while Triestina and Torino had been relegated from Serie A.

== Events ==
Consequently, to the reform of the professional football in Italy following the Belfast Disaster, the first-ever elimination of the Italy football team into the World Cup Qualifiers, both a third promotion and relegation was introduced.

== Final classification ==
Pos	Team	Pld	W	D	L	GF	GA	GR	Pts	Promotion or relegation
1	Torino (P, C)	38	16	19	3	44	21	2.095	51	Promotion to Serie A
2	Lecco (P)	38	17	16	5	51	28	1.821	50	Promotion to Serie A
3	Catania (P)	38	14	19	5	55	38	1.447	47	Promotion to Serie A
4	Triestina	38	15	16	7	49	32	1.531	46	
5	Reggiana	38	14	11	13	51	50	1.020	39	
5	Ozo Mantova	38	15	9	14	42	38	1.105	39	
7	Brescia	38	11	16	11	35	38	0.921	38	
8	Verona	38	12	13	13	49	45	1.089	37	
8	Como	38	14	9	15	51	48	1.063	37	
8	Catanzaro	38	11	15	12	41	40	1.025	37	
8	Marzotto	38	12	13	13	37	40	0.925	37	
8	Messina	38	15	7	16	35	38	0.921	37	
13	Novara	38	13	9	16	38	40	0.950	35	
14	Sambenedettese	38	11	12	15	38	47	0.809	34	
14	Parma	38	9	16	13	38	50	0.760	34	
16	Simmenthal-Monza	38	11	11	16	46	53	0.868	33	Relegation tie-breaker
17	Venezia	38	9	15	14	34	42	0.810	33	Relegation tie-breaker
18	Taranto (R)	38	12	9	17	33	48	0.688	33	Serie C after tie-breaker
19	Modena (R)	38	9	14	15	38	51	0.745	32	Relegation to Serie C
20	Cagliari (R)	38	8	15	15	36	54	0.667	31	Relegation to Serie C

Source: Panini
(C) Champions; (P) Promoted; (R) Relegated

== Results ==
Home \ Away	BRE	CAG	CTN	CTZ	COM	LCO	MAR	MES	MOD	NOV	OZO	PAR	REA	SBN	SMN	TAR	TOR	TRI	VEN	HEL
Brescia		1–0	4–2	1–0	0–0	0–0	0–0	1–0	2–1	0–1	1–2	1–0	2–2	0–0	1–0	3–0	0–2	1–0	1–1	1–1
Cagliari	2–2		0–1	5–2	1–5	2–3	1–1	1–0	1–1	0–0	2–1	2–0	2–2	1–1	2–1	0–1	0–0	0–1	1–1	2–1
Catania	2–0	0–0		1–0	2–1	2–2	2–0	2–0	1–1	3–1	3–0	2–2	3–2	1–0	1–1	2–0	0–0	1–1	4–1	4–0
Catanzaro	2–0	1–1	1–0		1–1	2–0	0–0	2–0	2–0	2–1	1–0	1–1	2–1	1–1	2–0	2–0	0–1	1–1	1–1	0–0
Como	4–0	3–0	1–1	3–2		0–1	1–1	2–1	1–1	2–2	0–1	1–1	3–1	3–0	2–1	1–1	2–1	0–1	1–0	0–1
Lecco	2–0	0–0	2–2	2–2	3–2		1–0	1–0	2–1	2–0	1–1	1–1	3–1	3–0	3–0	2–0	0–0	1–1	3–0	3–1
Marzotto	0–0	2–0	3–1	4–2	1–1	0–0		0–2	0–0	0–2	1–1	2–1	0–1	3–1	1–2	3–0	0–0	1–0	1–1	1–4
Messina	0–0	3–0	0–0	0–0	0–1	2–1	1–0		1–0	2–0	1–0	1–1	1–0	1–0	6–1	1–0	1–2	0–1	0–0	2–0
Modena	0–2	2–1	0–0	1–1	3–0	1–0	0–1	0–2		1–0	0–1	4–0	2–2	3–1	1–1	1–0	0–0	1–4	3–0	0–0
Novara	1–3	1–1	3–1	1–0	1–2	0–0	1–2	0–0	4–1		2–1	1–1	1–0	2–0	0–1	2–0	3–0	1–1	1–0	1–2
Ozo Mantova	1–1	2–1	0–0	0–1	2–1	1–2	2–1	3–0	4–1	0–0		2–2	0–2	1–0	1–1	2–0	1–1	1–0	3–0	2–0
Parma	1–0	1–1	1–1	1–0	2–0	0–0	3–1	2–0	2–2	1–0	1–1		0–1	1–1	0–0	1–0	0–2	2–2	1–0	2–0
Reggiana	0–0	2–0	1–1	1–0	1–2	0–2	1–0	3–1	2–2	2–1	2–0	3–1		5–3	1–0	2–0	1–1	4–1	0–0	1–1
Sambenedettese	2–1	1–1	1–1	2–1	1–0	0–0	1–3	4–1	3–0	0–0	2–0	2–2	0–0		1–0	3–0	0–0	1–0	2–0	1–0
Simm.-Monza	2–1	2–3	1–1	0–0	2–4	1–2	0–1	3–1	1–1	1–2	2–1	2–1	3–0	2–0		4–1	1–1	1–1	3–1	2–0
Taranto	0–0	0–1	2–3	1–1	3–1	1–0	2–1	1–2	2–0	1–0	2–0	2–1	2–1	2–0	2–1		0–0	1–1	4–0	2–2
Torino	1–1	5–0	1–1	3–2	1–0	1–1	0–0	0–0	3–1	1–0	0–1	2–0	3–2	1–1	1–0	4–0		1–1	1–0	2–0
Triestina	4–2	1–0	2–2	0–0	1–0	1–1	1–1	2–0	3–0	2–0	1–0	4–1	1–1	2–0	4–1	0–0	0–1		0–2	2–1
Venezia	1–1	0–0	0–0	3–1	3–0	1–0	0–1	0–2	0–0	4–0	0–2	4–0	2–0	4–2	1–1	0–0	0–0	0–0		1–1
Hellas Verona	1–1	3–1	3–1	2–2	3–0	1–1	4–0	4–0	1–2	0–2	2–1	1–0	4–0	1–0	1–1	0–0	1–1	1–1	1–2	

Source: Almanacco Illustrato del Calcio - La Storia 1898-2004, Panini Edizioni, Modena, September 2005 (in Italian)
Legend: Blue = home team win; Yellow = draw; Red = away team win.

== Relegation tie-breaker ==
Team 1	Score	Team 2
Simmenthal-Monza (Italy)	0-0	(Italy) Taranto
Simmenthal-Monza (Italy)	2-0	(Italy) Venezia
Taranto (Italy)	2-4	(Italy) Venezia

Taranto relegated to Serie C.

== References and sources ==
- Almanacco Illustrato del Calcio - La Storia 1898-2004, Panini Edizioni, Modena, September 2005
