= Maniani =

Maniani is a surname. Notable people with the surname include:

- Mirela Maniani (born 1976), Albanian born in Greece thrower who has also represented Albania
- Oktovianus Maniani (born 1990), Indonesian footballer

== See also ==
- Manini (disambiguation)
