= Ken Birch =

English footballer (1933–2015)

Personal information
- Full name: Kenneth Joseph Birch
- Date of birth: 31 December 1933
- Place of birth: Birkenhead, England
- Date of death: 24 April 2015 (aged 81)
- Height: 5 ft 9 in (1.75 m)
- Position: Right-half

Youth career
- Birkenhead Boys
- Bebington Hawks
- Everton

Senior career*
Years	Team	Apps	(Gls)
1951–1958	Everton	43	(1)
1958–1959	Southampton	34	(3)
1959–1960	Chelmsford City	27	(5)
1960–1962	Bangor City		
1963–19??	Benoni Premier United		

Managerial career
- 1963–19??: Benoni Premier United (player-manager)
- * Club domestic league appearances and goals

Kenneth Joseph Birch (31 December 1933 – 24 April 2015) was an English footballer who played as a right-half for Everton and Southampton, before leading Welsh club Bangor City to victory in the Welsh Cup in 1962.

== Football career ==
=== Everton ===
Birch was born in Birkenhead and played as a junior for Bebington Hawks and Birkenhead Boys. As a schoolboy he played at centre-forward before joining Everton as a trainee in August 1951.

His football career was interrupted during his National Service, when he joined the Royal Tank Corps and represented the Army at football. He made his Everton first-team debut in a 1–1 draw at Sheffield United on 2 April 1956. He made a further three appearances that season and was a regular at right-back in 1956–57 but fell out of favour the following year.

=== Southampton ===
In March 1958, he was signed by Ted Bates of Southampton for a fee of £6,000 and went straight into the first team, making his "Saints" debut in a 3–1 victory at Northampton Town on 15 March 1958 as a replacement for Bryn Elliott. With Birch retaining his place for the last ten matches of the season, of which seven were victories, Southampton finished in sixth place in the Third Division South, thus enabling the team to qualify for the newly formed Third Division proper.

In the next season, Birch played the first 20 league matches, but struggled to maintain his form and lost his place, first to Terry Simpson and then to Brian Clifton.

Birch was released in the summer of 1959 and joined Chelmsford City of the Southern League for a season before joining Bangor City in August 1960.

=== Bangor City ===
At this time, Bangor were playing in the Cheshire League and regularly finished mid-table, but in Birch's first season with the Welsh club, they reached the final of the Welsh Cup, going down 3–1 to Swansea Town. The following season, Bangor again reached the final, this time against Wrexham; after each team had won one match of the two-legged final, they met again in a play-off on 7 May 1962 at Belle Vue, Rhyl. Birch was one of the scorers as Bangor ran out 3–1 victors.

Victory in the Welsh Cup entitled Bangor to enter the European Cup Winners' Cup where they were drawn against the Italian cup-winners, Napoli in the preliminary round. The first leg was played at Bangor's Farrar Road Stadium on 5 September 1961 in front of a capacity crowd of 8,000. Part-timers Bangor City, who were lying sixth in the Cheshire League, outplayed their famous rivals. Whilst Napoli played typical Italian pass and move football, Bangor's no-nonsense more direct style of football paid off. After 43 minutes, a cross from Hunter was met by Matthews who shot home through a crowd of defenders to beat the unsighted keeper. Throughout the second half, Bangor missed numerous chances to increase their lead, hitting the bar twice, while successive Napoli attacks were repelled by the Bangor defenders. Then, after 82 minutes, Brown was fouled in the Napoli penalty area. Birch, the team captain, converted the penalty and, with no further scoring, Bangor had beaten Napoli by two goals to nil to become the first Welsh club to win in European competition.

The Second Leg was played in Naples on 26 September in front of a crowd of 80,000. Napoli were 2–0 up after 54 minutes, before Bangor scored with twenty minutes remaining, when an awkward throw-in from Birch caused havoc in the Napoli penalty-area, allowing McAllister to sneak the ball past the goalkeeper to put Bangor back ahead on goal difference. Napoli then took the match to a play-off when they scored with five minutes remaining to bring the score to 3–1, 3–3 on aggregate.

At that time, the "away goals rule" didn't apply, so a play-off was arranged at Arsenal's Highbury stadium on Wednesday 10 October. Napoli took the lead on 37 minutes when Rosa fired a 20-yard shot in off the crossbar. A tremendous display by Len Davies in goal kept City in the game, and after 25 minutes of the second half, Ellis headed the ball down into the path of McAllister who slotted the ball past Pontel in the Napoli goal. Unfortunately for Bangor, with five minutes to go, Rosa capitalised on a rebound to score his second of the night and put Napoli through.

== Later career ==
Birch left Bangor in January 1963, to take up the post of player-manager to Benoni in Johannesburg, South Africa.

In May 2007, Birch was a guest of honour at Farrar Road for the Bangor City Legends Reunion & Challenge Match.

== Honours ==
Bangor City

- Welsh Cup winners: 1962
- Welsh Cup finalists: 1961
