= Tito Fabbri =

Italian footballer (born 2009)

Personal information
- Full name: Tito Maria Fabbri
- Date of birth: 22 September 2009 (age 17)
- Place of birth: Modena, Italy
- Position: Midfielder

Team information
- Current team: Modena
- Number: 6

Youth career
- 2023–2025: Sassuolo
- 2025–2026: Modena

Senior career*
| Years | Team | Apps | (Gls) |
| 2025– | Modena | 1 | (0) |

International career^{‡}
| 2024–2025 | Italy U16 | 4 | (0) |
| 2025 | Italy U17 | 7 | (1) |
- * Club domestic league appearances and goals as of 28 July 2026 ‡ National team caps and goals as of 28 July 2026

Tito Fabbri (born 22 September 2009) is an Italian professional footballer who plays as a midfielder for Modena.

== Club career ==
Born in Modena, Fabbri first played for the World Child of San Faustino in his hometown, before joining the Sassuolo Academy in 2023, where he was a standout with the under-15 and under-16. Also a rugby player before he fully dedicated his career to football, he still was spending half of his time playing rugby while with the under-15 at Sassuolo.

In the summer 2026, he choose to sign his first professional contract with Modena, where he soon became a leader of the Primavera team.

In February 2026 he first featured on the team sheet with Andrea Sottil's first team during a Serie A game.

Fabbri made his professional debut with Modena in a 1–0 Serie B loss to Avellino on 8 May 2026. At 16 years old, 7 months and 12 days, he became Modena's youngest ever player, in a team where had already played fellow youngsters Edoardo Colpo, Pietro Arnaboldi and Samuel Wiafe that season.

== International career ==
Fabbri is a youth international for Italy, having played for the under-16 and under-17. For his first two games with the latter he scored a goal and delivered two assists during two friendlies against Albania

== Style of play ==
Tito Fabbri is described as versatile midfielder, tactically astute and technically gifted, great moving the ball forward with precise passing.

He been compared to the likes of Miralem Pjanić and his footballing model is Belgian international Kevin De Bruyne.
