= Sant Martí de Torroella =

- Singular population entity
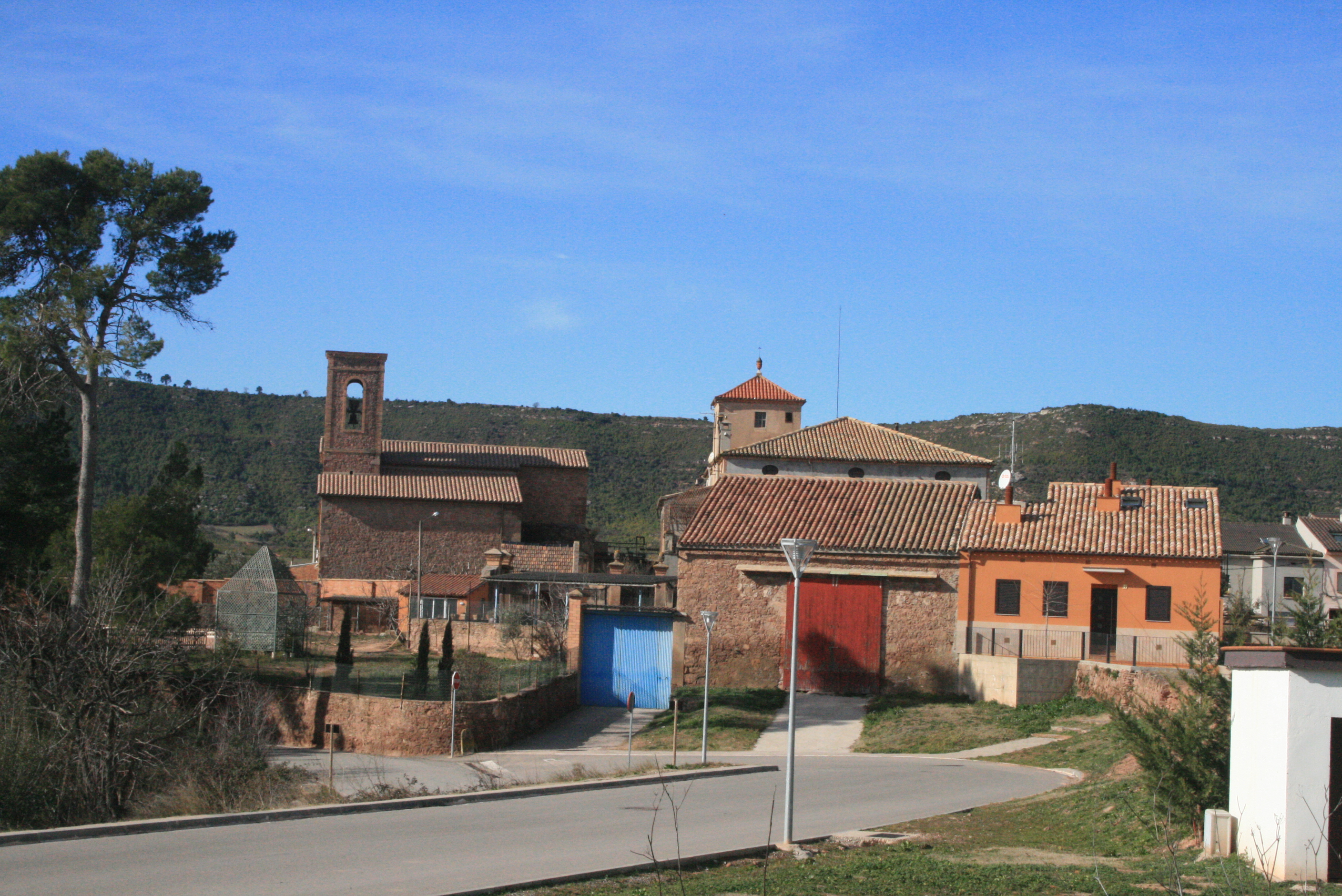
- View of Sant Martí de Torroella

- Flag Seal

- Location within Spain Location within Catalonia Location within Province of Barcelona
- Coordinates: 41°46′23.6″N 1°47′24.0″E
- Country: Spain
- A. community: Catalunya
- Province: Barcelona
- Municipality: Sant Joan de Vilatorrada

Population (January 1, 2024)
  - Total: 215
- Time zone: UTC+01:00
- Postal code: 08250
- MCN: 08218000200

Sant Martí de Torroella is a singular population entity in the municipality of Sant Joan de Vilatorrada, in Catalonia, Spain.

As of 2024 it has a population of 215 people.
