= Joncadella =

- Singular population entity
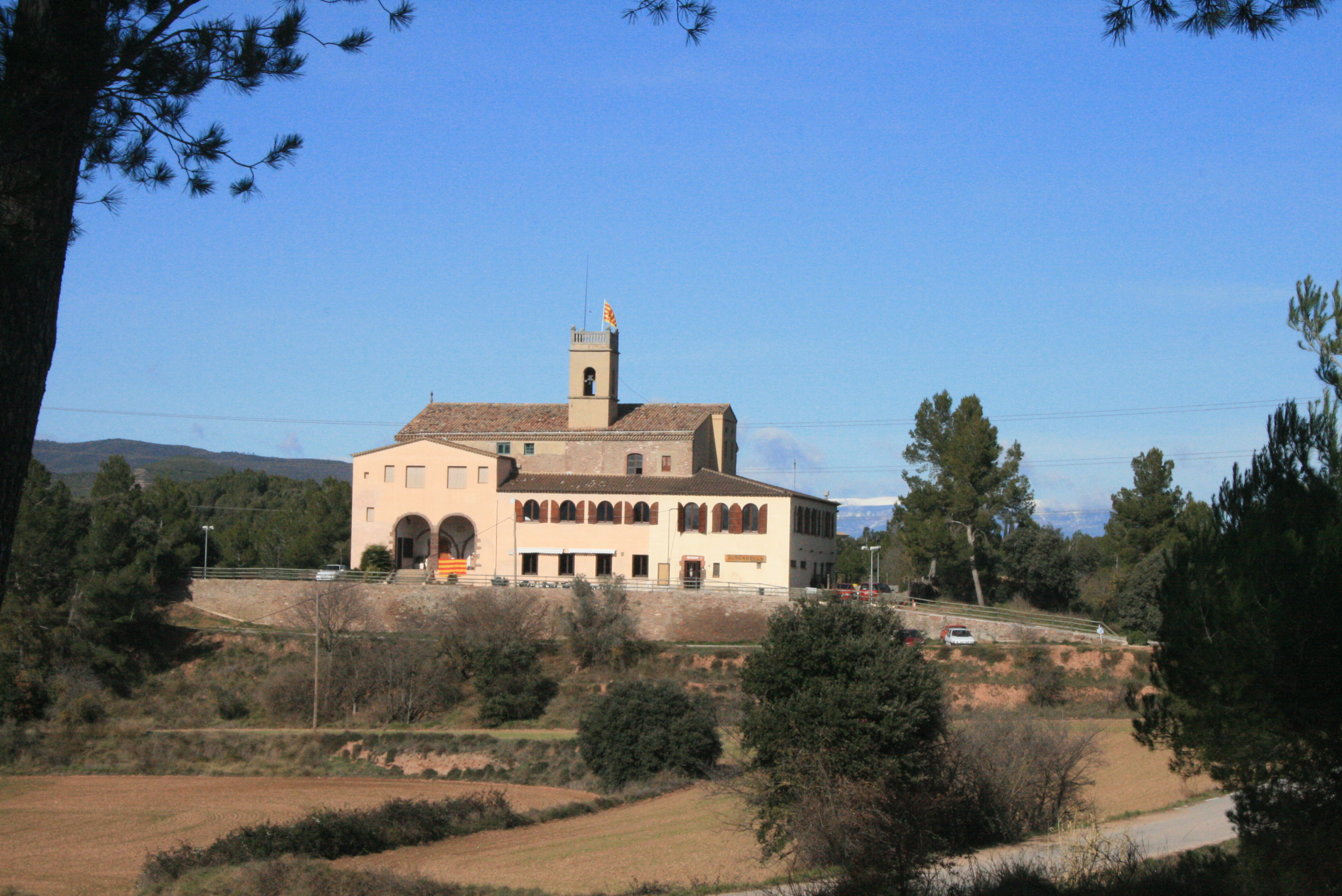

- Location within Spain Location within Catalonia Location within Province of Barcelona
- Coordinates: 41°46′05.7″N 1°48′10.1″E
- Country: Spain
- A. community: Catalunya
- Province: Barcelona
- Municipality: Sant Joan de Vilatorrada

Population (January 1, 2024)
  - Total: 18
- Time zone: UTC+01:00
- Postal code: 08250
- MCN: 08218000100

Joncadella is a singular population entity in the municipality of Sant Joan de Vilatorrada, in Catalonia, Spain.

As of 2024 it has a population of 18 people.
