= Đorđe Pavlić =

Serbian footballer (1938–2015)

Personal information
- Date of birth: 28 August 1938
- Place of birth: Drenovac, Kingdom of Yugoslavia
- Date of death: 9 May 2015 (aged 76)
- Place of death: Novi Sad, Serbia
- Height: 1.77 m (5 ft 10 in)
- Position: Forward

Senior career*
Years	Team	Apps	(Gls)
- Sloven Ruma
1960–1966	Vojvodina	109	(48)
1966–1972	MSV Duisburg	173	(21)
1972–1974	Schwarz-Weiß Essen	19	(3)

International career
1963–1964	Yugoslavia	2	(0)
- * Club domestic league appearances and goals

Đorđe Pavlić (28 August 1938 – 9 May 2015) was a Serbian professional footballer who played as a forward. He was capped twice by Yugoslavia in 1963 and 1964.
