= The Missing Leech =

Catalonian musician

- Origin: Barcelona, Catalonia, Spain
- Years active: 2007–present
- Labels: El Mamut Traçut Records
- Website: http://www.myspace.com/themissingleech

The Missing Leech (real name Maurici Ribera) is a Catalonian anti-folk and folk-punk singer-songwriter from Sant Joan de Vilatorrada in Barcelona, Spain. He has performed hundreds on concerts worldwide with artists such as Daniel Johnston and The Wave Pictures. He starred in a documentary-style movie titled "The Unfinished Story of the Missing Leech" exploring the Catalan anti-folk scene.

== Discography ==
- A Set of Dreams in Lo-Fi (2010)
- Trompetes A Holanda (2013)
- Sacsejant El Sotabosc (2017)

=== Mencions honorífiques ===
In 2023, The Missing Leech released Mencions honorífiques on El Mamut Traçut. Ribera played the guitar, keyboard and sang on the album. He was supported by Lluís Sylvestre on guitar, bass and keyboard, and by Amós Pérez on drums. The album was made "in honor of those second-tier artists who may never manage to position themselves at the forefront, but who feel an authentic love for music."

== The Unfinished Story of the Missing Leech ==
The musical documentary film The Unfinished Story of the Missing Leech (A film about something called antifolk) was made and released by Plans Films. It was directed by Vicenç Ferreres. Maurici Ribera starred in the film and arranged the music on the soundtrack. It was released in 2015.
