= Claudio Guglielmoni =

Italian footballer (born 1940)

Personal information
- Date of birth: January 18, 1940 (age 86)
- Place of birth: Verona, Italy
- Height: 1.73 m (5 ft 8 in)
- Position: Midfielder

Senior career*
Years	Team	Apps	(Gls)
1956–1958	Audace S. Michele Extra		
1958–1961	Internazionale	1	(0)
1961–1962	Catanzaro	23	(3)
1962–1964	Cesena	42	(2)
1964–1969	Pisa	148	(13)
1969–1971	Modena	51	(2)
1971–1972	Massese	18	(?)
- * Club domestic league appearances and goals

Claudio Guglielmoni (born January 18, 1940, in Verona) is an Italian former professional footballer.
