= Agliana =

- Comune
- Comune di Agliana
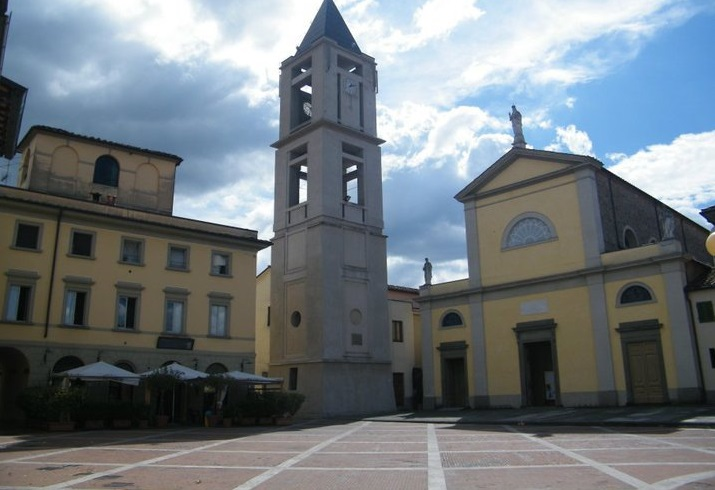
- Piazza Gramsci, Agliana

- Coat of arms

- Location of Agliana in Italy Agliana (Tuscany)
- Coordinates: 43°54′N 11°00′E
- Country: Italy
- Region: Tuscany
- Province: Pistoia (PT)
- Frazioni: S. Piero, S. Niccolò, S. Michele, Spedalino, Ferruccia, Catena, Ponte dei Bini, Ponte alla Trave

Government
  - Mayor: Luca Benesperi

Area
  - Total: 11.68 km^{2} (4.51 sq mi)
- Elevation: 42 m (138 ft)

Population (30 April 2017)
  - Total: 17,709
  - Density: 1,516/km^{2} (3,927/sq mi)
- Demonym: Aglianesi
- Time zone: UTC+1 (CET)
  - Summer (DST): UTC+2 (CEST)
- Postal code: 51031
- Dialing code: 0574
- Website: Official website

Agliana (Italian pronunciation: [aʎˈʎana]) is a comune (municipality) in the Province of Pistoia in the Italian region of Tuscany, located about 25 kilometres (16 mi) northwest of Florence and about 7 kilometres (4 mi) southeast of Pistoia. Agliana borders the municipalities of Montale, Montemurlo, Pistoia, Prato, and Quarrata.

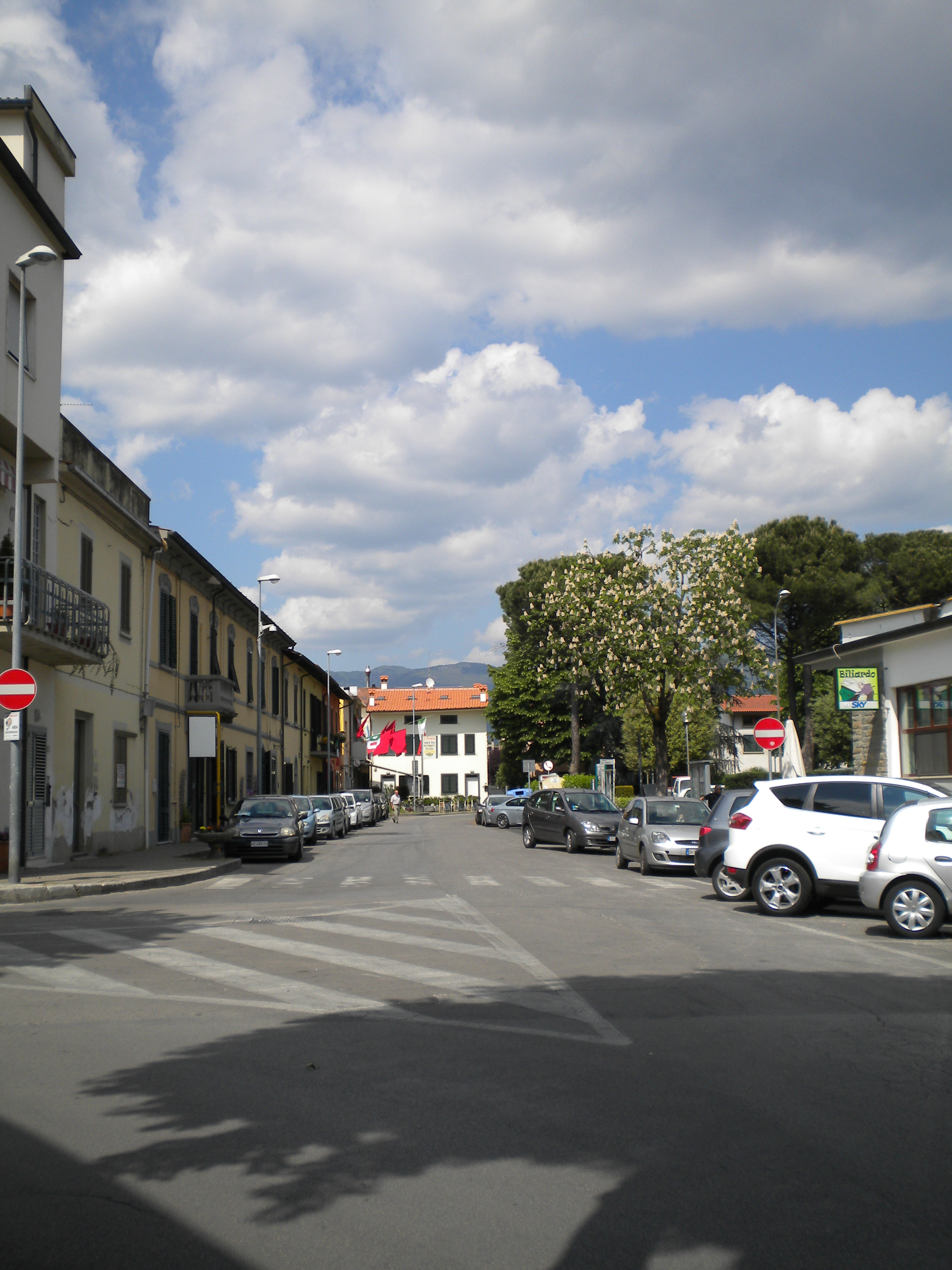
A street in Agliana

== Notable people ==
- Giuseppe Morosi, professional footballer

== Twin towns ==
Agliana is twinned with:

- Mallemort, France
- Tifariti, Western Sahara
- Beit Sahour, Palestine
