= Sant Joan de Vilatorrada =

- Municipality
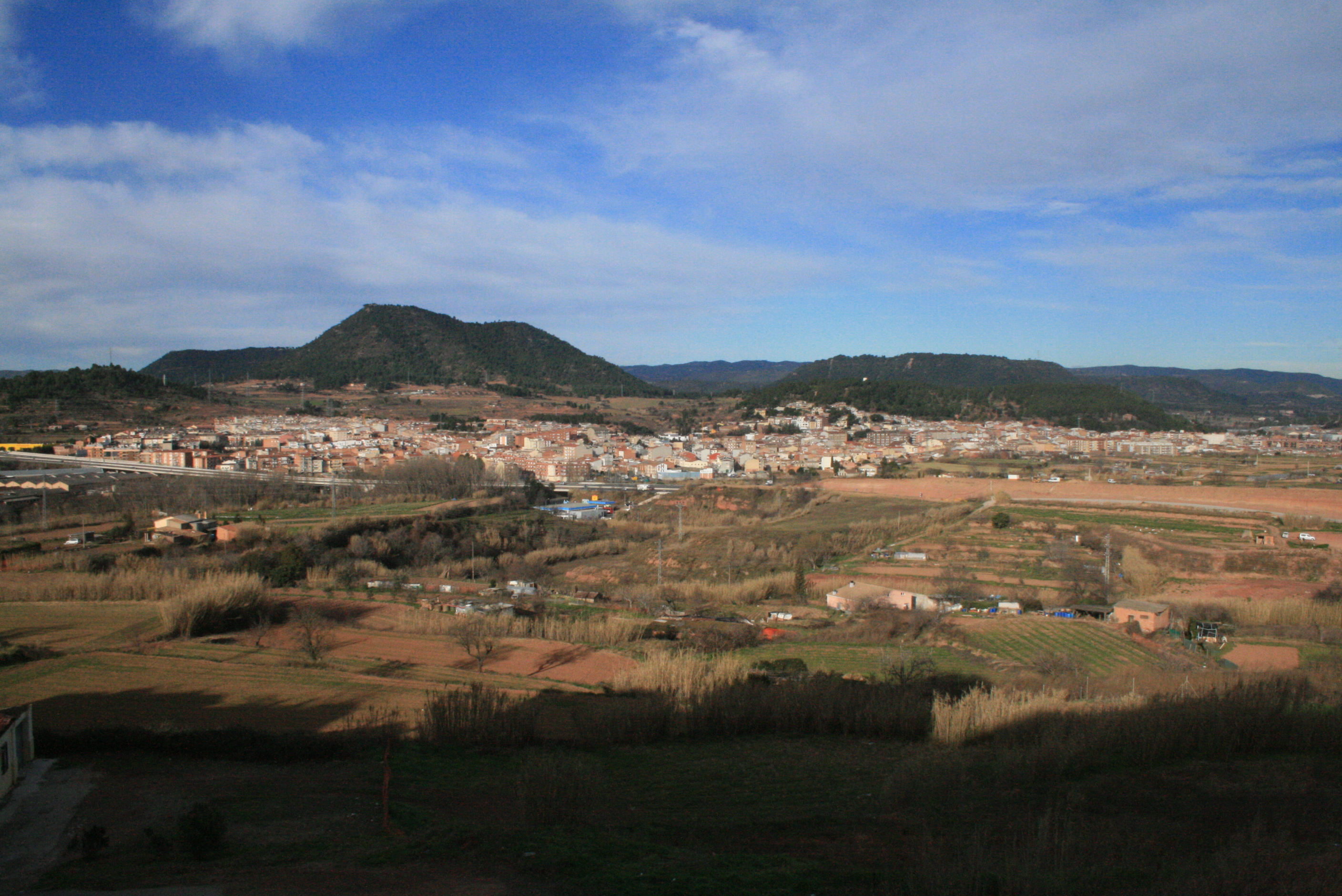
- Sant Joan

- Flag Coat of arms

- Location in Catalonia Sant Joan de Vilatorrada (Spain)
- Coordinates: 41°45′N 1°48′E
- Country: Spain
- Community: Catalonia
- Province: Barcelona
- Comarca: Bages

Government
  - Mayor: Jordi Solernou i Vilalta(2019)

Area
  - Total: 16.4 km^{2} (6.3 sq mi)
- Elevation: 277 m (909 ft)

Population (2025-01-01)
  - Total: 11,133
  - Density: 679/km^{2} (1,760/sq mi)
- Demonym(s): Santjoanenc, santjoanenca
- Website: www.santjoanvilatorrada.cat

Sant Joan de Vilatorrada (Catalan pronunciation: [ˈsaɲ ʒuˈan də ˌβilətuˈraðə]) is a municipality in the comarca of the Bages in Catalonia, Spain. It is about 50 kilometres (31 mi) away from Barcelona.

The town of Sant Joan de Vilatorrada is located at 3 km. from Manresa, the capital of the Bages comarca (county). The municipal limits are in the North Sant Mateu de Bages and Callús, in the Northeast Santpedor; in the East Sant Fruitós de Bages, in the South-east Manresa and in the West Fonollosa.

In addition to the main namesake town, the municipality also contains the population entities of Sant Martí de Torroella and Joncadella.

== Notable people ==
- Antonio Camps, Spanish football player and manager
- The Missing Leech (real name Maurici Ribera), anti folk musician
