= 1960–61 Serie C =

The 1960–61 Serie C was the twenty-third edition of Serie C, the third highest league in the Italian football league system.

== Girone A ==
=== Final classification ===
Pos	Team	Pld	W	D	L	GF	GA	GD	Pts	Promotion or relegation
1	Modena	34	17	10	7	44	21	+23	44	Promoted to Serie B
2	Biellese	34	17	5	12	52	35	+17	39	
3	Saronno	34	16	6	12	46	37	+9	38	
4	Fanfulla	34	13	11	10	41	33	+8	37	
5	Bolzano	34	13	10	11	42	35	+7	36	
6	Pro Vercelli	34	13	10	11	29	35	−6	36	
7	Spezia	34	11	13	10	43	42	+1	35	
8	Savona	34	13	9	12	47	38	+9	35	
9	Mestrina	34	14	6	14	49	42	+7	34	
10	Legnano	34	10	14	10	32	32	0	34	
11	Sanremese	34	11	11	12	31	39	−8	33	
12	Pordenone	34	12	7	15	40	41	−1	31	
13	Treviso	34	9	13	12	27	34	−7	31	
14	Casale	34	12	7	15	29	41	−12	31	
15	Cremonese	34	12	7	15	29	42	−13	31	
16	Varese	34	10	10	14	30	44	−14	30	
17	Piacenza	34	12	5	17	36	50	−14	29	Relegated to Serie D
18	Entella	34	8	12	14	32	38	−6	28	Relegated to Serie D

== Girone B ==
=== Final classification ===
Pos	Team	Pld	W	D	L	GF	GA	GD	Pts	Promotion or relegation
1	Lucchese	34	19	11	4	55	29	+26	49	Promoted to Serie B
2	Cagliari	34	19	7	8	48	26	+22	45	
3	Livorno	34	16	10	8	50	34	+16	42	
4	Siena	34	14	12	8	45	29	+16	40	
5	Anconitana	34	15	9	10	36	33	+3	39	
6	Del Duca Ascoli	34	13	8	13	32	33	−1	34	
7	Tevere Roma	34	10	14	10	34	39	−5	34	
8	Pisa	34	12	9	13	39	43	−4	33	
9	Sarom Ravenna	34	11	11	12	38	43	−5	33	
10	Pistoiese	34	12	8	14	32	32	0	32	
11	Perugia	34	10	11	13	36	44	−8	31	
12	Rimini	34	9	13	12	34	44	−10	31	
13	Forlì	34	10	10	14	37	39	−2	30	
14	Arezzo	34	11	8	15	38	42	−4	30	
15	Torres	34	9	11	14	33	33	0	29	
16	Cesena	34	9	11	14	30	39	−9	29	
17	Viareggio	34	8	12	14	29	40	−11	28	Relegated to Serie D
18	Vis Sauro Pesaro	34	7	9	18	31	55	−24	23	Relegated to Serie D

== Girone C ==
=== Final classification ===
Pos	Team	Pld	W	D	L	GF	GA	GD	Pts	Promotion or relegation
1	Cosenza	34	19	9	6	53	21	+32	47	Promoted to Serie B
2	Trapani	34	19	8	7	44	24	+20	46	
3	Siracusa	34	16	12	6	45	21	+24	44	
4	San Vito Benevento	34	15	10	9	34	28	+6	40	
5	Taranto	34	16	5	13	39	30	+9	37	
6	Marsala	34	14	8	12	36	32	+4	36	
7	Reggina	34	12	10	12	33	27	+6	34	
8	Lecce	34	14	6	14	50	50	0	34	
9	Salernitana	34	10	13	11	29	36	−7	33	
10	L'Aquila	34	9	14	11	27	42	−15	32	
11	Bisceglie	34	13	5	16	48	43	+5	31	
12	Pescara	34	14	3	17	40	38	+2	31	
13	Chieti	34	7	17	10	26	34	−8	31	
14	Akragas	34	12	7	15	31	44	−13	31	
15	Barletta	34	11	7	16	24	33	−9	29	
16	Crotone	34	9	10	15	36	45	−9	28	
17	Cirio	34	7	14	13	25	45	−20	28 (Note: Relegated after tie-breaker: Cirio-Crotone 1-2)	Relegated to Serie D
18	Avellino	34	6	8	20	23	50	−27	20	Relegated to Serie D

== References and sources ==
- Almanacco Illustrato del Calcio - La Storia 1898-2004, Panini Edizioni, Modena, September 2005
