= Giorgio Dellagiovanna =

Italian footballer

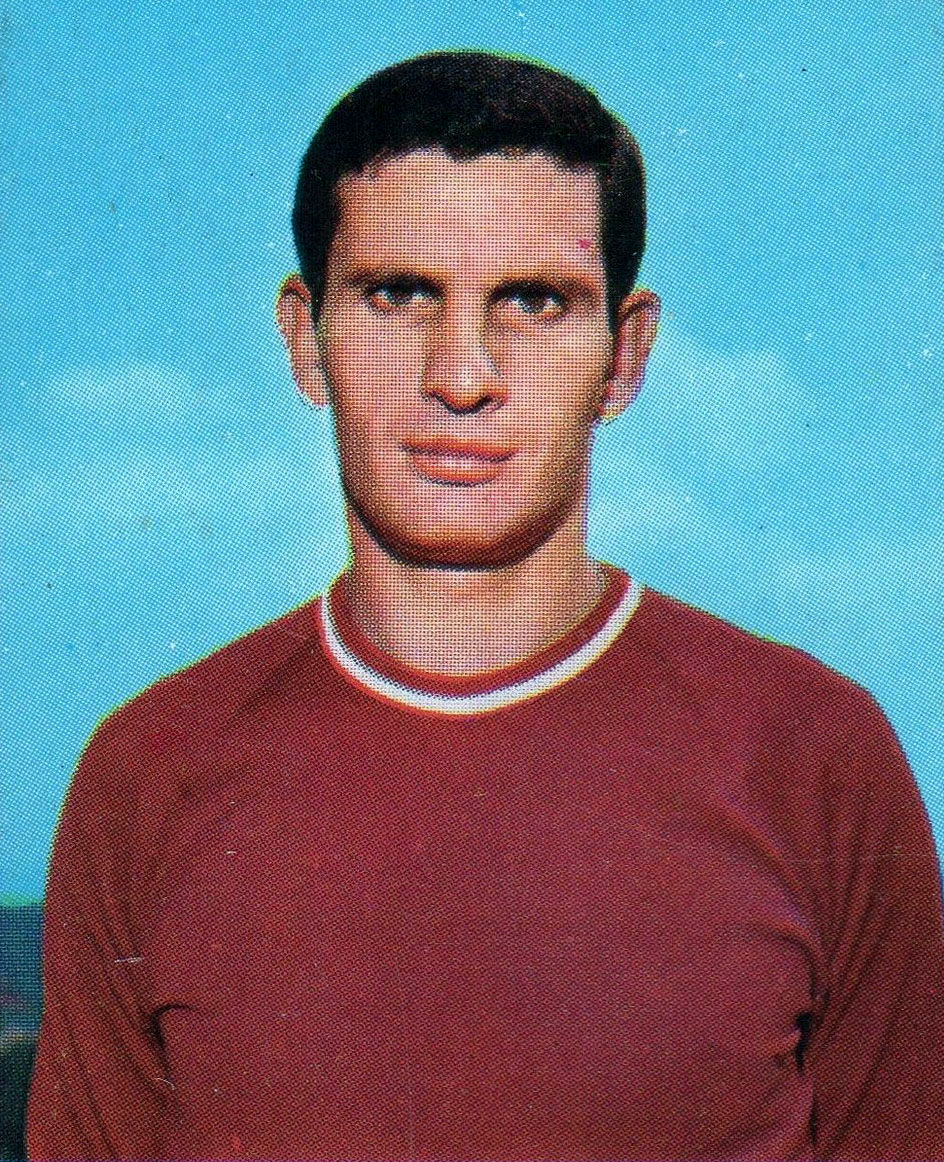
- Dellagiovanna with Varese in 1967

Personal information
- Date of birth: 10 July 1941
- Place of birth: Milan, Italy
- Date of death: 17 October 2013 (aged 72)
- Place of death: Milan, Italy
- Height: 1.85 m (6 ft 1 in)
- Position: Defender

Senior career*
Years	Team	Apps	(Gls)
1961–1966	Internazionale	10	(1)
1962–1963	→ Brescia (loan)	22	(1)
1963–1964	→ Potenza (loan)	38	(0)
1966–1972	Varese	184	(1)
1972–1975	Seregno	96	(0)
1975–1976	Sant'Angelo	22	(0)
- * Club domestic league appearances and goals

Giorgio Dellagiovanna (10 July 1941 – 17 October 2013) was an Italian professional football player.

== Honours ==
- Serie A champion: 1964/65, 1965/66.
