= Antonio Camps =

Spanish football player and manager (1938–2026)

Personal information
- Full name: Antoni Camps i Bau
- Date of birth: 24 May 1938
- Place of birth: Sant Joan de Vilatorrada, Spain
- Date of death: 8 March 2026 (aged 87)
- Place of death: Altafulla, Spain
- Height: 1.70 m (5 ft 7 in)
- Position: Forward

Youth career
- Manresa
- 1955–1956: Barcelona

Senior career*
Years	Team	Apps	(Gls)
1956–1957	Manresa	43	(20)
1957–1962	Espanyol	116	(24)
1962–1964	Barcelona	17	(3)
1964–1965	Mataró		
1965–1968	Sabadell	32	(7)
1968–1969	Mallorca	8	(0)

International career
1960	Catalonia	1	(0)
1960	Spain U-21	1	(0)

Managerial career
- 1969–1970: Calella
- 1970–1971: Mataró
- 1971–1972: Sants
- * Club domestic league appearances and goals

Antonio Camps Bau (24 May 1938 – 8 March 2026) was a Spanish football player and manager.

A forward, Camps notably played for FC Barcelona and RCD Espanyol, winning the Copa del Generalísimo with the former in 1963. He also played in one match for the Catalan national team and coached for CF Calella, CE Mataró, and UE Sants.

Camps died in Altafulla on 8 March 2026, at the age of 87.
