= Roberto Tacchini =

Italian footballer

Personal information
- Date of birth: December 14, 1940 (age 85)
- Place of birth: Rapallo, Italy
- Position: Midfielder

Senior career*
Years	Team	Apps	(Gls)
1959–1960	Rapallo Ruentes	18	(?)
1960–1961	Internazionale	1	(0)
1961–1963	Tevere Roma	36	(?)
1963–1964	Internazionale	0	(0)
1964–1965	Bari	16	(0)
1965–1969	Trani	126	(?)
1969–1973	Liberty Bari		
- * Club domestic league appearances and goals

Roberto Tacchini (born December 14, 1940, in Rapallo) is a retired Italian professional footballer.
