= Mario Da Pozzo =

Italian former football goalkeeper

Personal information
- Date of birth: 9 July 1939 (age 87)
- Place of birth: Legnago, Italy
- Height: 1.79 m (5 ft 10 1/2 in)
- Position: Goalkeeper

Senior career*
Years	Team	Apps	(Gls)
1958–1959	Inter	2	
1959–1960	Catanzaro	18	
1960–1961	Inter	3	
1961–1965	Genoa	122	
1965–1969	Varese	92	
1969–1973	Mantova	66	
1973–1974	Napoli	0	
- * Club domestic league appearances and goals

Mario Da Pozzo (born 9 July 1939 in Legnago, Province of Verona) is an Italian former football goalkeeper.

== Career ==
Throughout his career, Da Pozzo played for Inter (1958–59; 1960–61), Catanzaro (1959–60), Genoa (1961–65), Varese (1965–69), Mantova (1969–73), and Napoli (1973–74). He made his debut in Serie A with Inter, on 2 June 1959, in a 1–1 away draw against Alessandria. During his time with Genoa, he won a Serie B title, and the Coppa delle Alpi twice; he also established what was, at the time, the record for the most minutes without conceding in Serie A, during the 1963–64 season, going unbeaten for 791 minutes. He held the record until it was broken by Juventus's Dino Zoff, during the 1972–73 season. Currently, his unbeaten streak is the fourth best in Serie A history. With Mantova, he won another Serie B title during the 1970–71 season, also setting a record for the most minutes without conceding a goal in the Italian second division during the same season, with an 878-minute unbeaten streak.

== Honours ==
Genoa

- Serie B: 1961–62
- Coppa delle Alpi: 1962, 1964

Mantova

- Serie B: 1970–71
