= László Bödör =

Hungarian footballer

Personal information
- Date of birth: 17 August 1933 (age 93)
- Place of birth: Budapest, Hungary
- Position: Forward

Senior career*
| Years | Team | Apps | (Gls) |
| 1956–1965 | MTK Budapest FC | 177 | (61) |

International career
| 1961 | Hungary | 1 | (0) |
- * Club domestic league appearances and goals

László Bödör (born 17 August 1933) is a Hungarian football player. A forward, he played for Hungary in the 1962 FIFA World Cup. He also played for MTK Budapest FC.
