= Costanzo Balleri =

Italian footballer and coach (1933-2017)

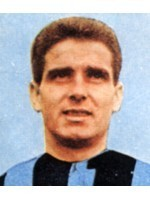

Personal information
- Date of birth: 20 August 1933
- Place of birth: Livorno, Italy
- Date of death: 2 November 2017 (aged 84)
- Place of death: Livorno
- Height: 1.81 m (5 ft 11 1/2 in)
- Position: Defender

Senior career*
Years	Team	Apps	(Gls)
1953–1959	Livorno	148	(7)
1959–1960	SPAL	30	(0)
1960	Torino	5	(0)
1960–1962	Internazionale	45	(1)
1962–1964	Modena	51	(2)
1964–1965	SPAL	19	(0)
1965–1967	Livorno	48	(2)
1967–1970	Montevarchi	77	(2)

Managerial career
- 1970–1972: Livorno
- 1972–1973: Montevarchi
- 1973–1974: Perugia
- 1974-1975: Campobasso
- 1975–1976: Sangiovannese
- 1977–1980: Montevarchi
- 1981: Siena
- 1982–1983: Livorno
- * Club domestic league appearances and goals

Costanzo Balleri (20 August 1933 – 2 November 2017) was an Italian football player and coach, who played as a defender.

His son David Balleri was also a professional footballer.
