= Jorge Humberto =

Portuguese footballer

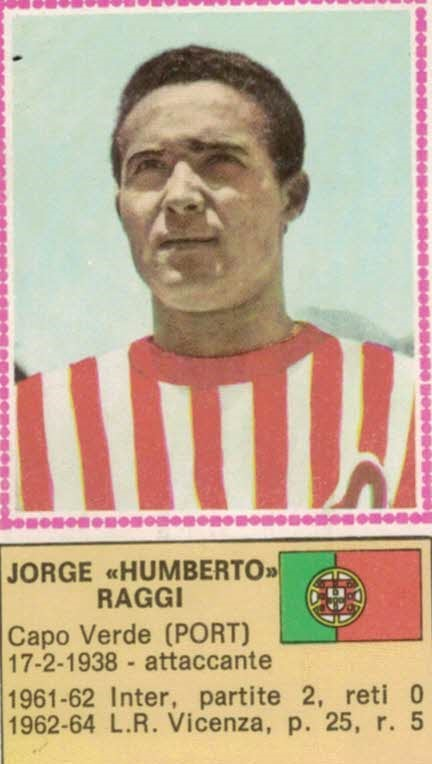

Personal information
- Full name: Jorge Humberto Raggi
- Date of birth: February 17, 1938 (age 88)
- Place of birth: São Vicente, Portuguese Cape Verde
- Height: 1.73 m (5 ft 8 in)
- Position: Striker

Senior career*
Years	Team	Apps	(Gls)
1957–1961	Académica	69	(20)
1961–1962	Inter Milan	2	(0)
1962–1964	Vicenza	25	(5)
1964–1966	Académica	27	(14)

Managerial career
- 1972: Académica
- * Club domestic league appearances and goals

Jorge Humberto Raggi (born 17 February 1938), known as Humberto, is a Portuguese retired professional footballer who played as a striker.

== Football career ==
Humberto played mostly for Académica de Coimbra during his professional career, starting and ending his nine-year career at the club. He also played for three seasons in Italy, with F.C. Internazionale Milano and Vicenza Calcio.

With the Nerazzurri, Humberto only appeared in two Serie A games, but he scored five goals in their 1961–62 Inter-Cities Fairs Cup campaign, including a hat-trick in the first round tie-breaker play-off game against 1. FC Köln.

== Personal life ==
Jorge Humberto is pediatrician and is living in Macao.
