= Drenovac, Šabac =

Drenovac Дреновац (Serbian)
- Village (Selo)
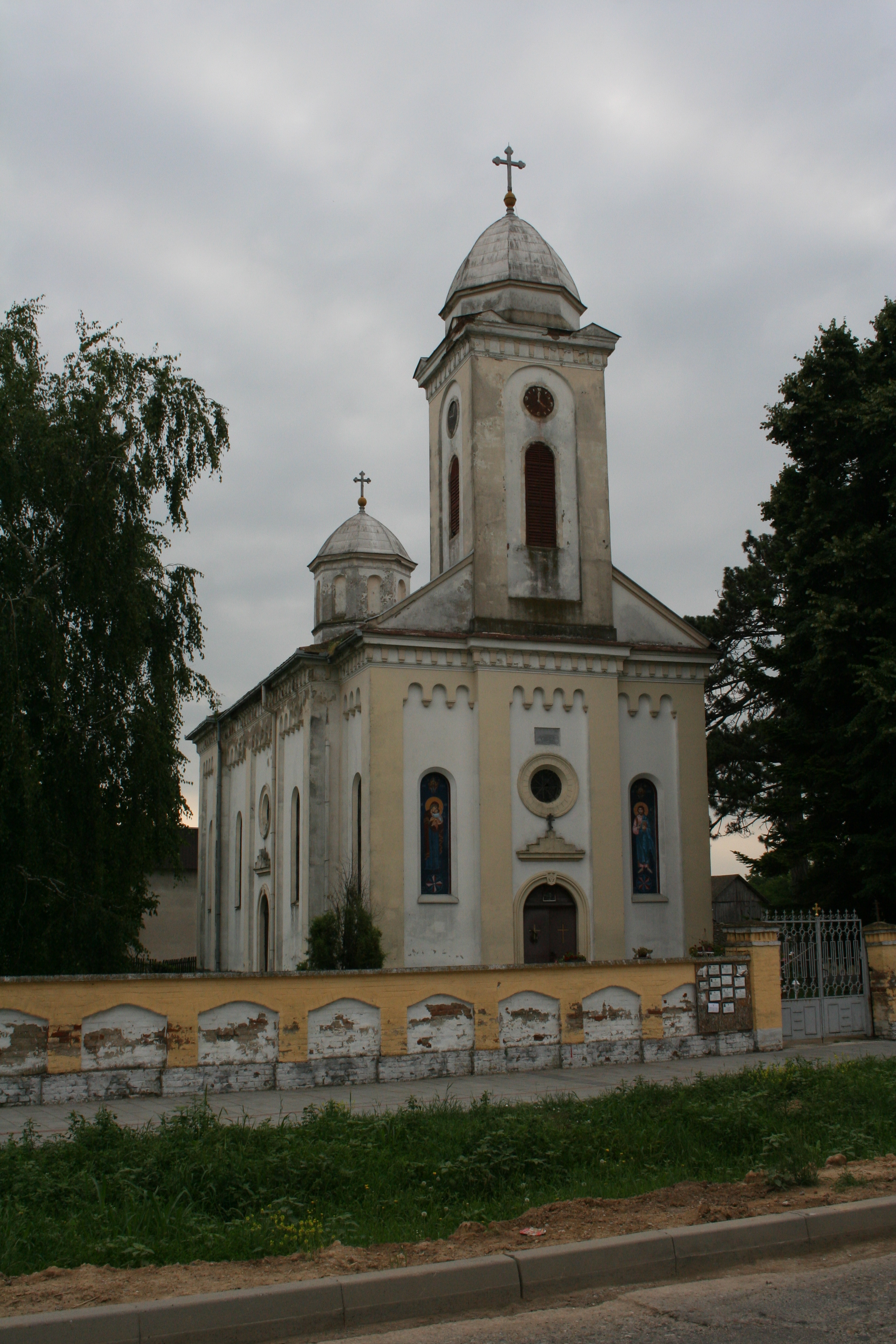

- Location within Serbia
- Coordinates: 44°52′03″N 19°42′36″E
- Country: Serbia
- Statistical Region: Šumadija and Western Serbia
- Region: Mačva
- District: Mačva District
- Municipality: Šabac

Area
  - Total: 16.27 sq mi (42.15 km^{2})
  - Land: 16.27 sq mi (42.15 km^{2})

Population (2022)
  - Total: 1,576
  - Density: 96.8/sq mi (37.39/km^{2})
- Time zone: UTC+1 (CET)
  - Summer (DST): UTC+2 (CEST)

Drenovac (Serbian Cyrillic: Дреновац) is a village in the municipality of Šabac, Serbia. According to the 2022 census, the village has a population of 1,576 people.
