= Giuseppe Manini =

Italian priest and historian

Giuseppe Manini (1750 - 1834) was an Italian priest and historian of Ferrara.

He was born in Ferrara, and became canon in the Cathedral of Ferrara. Among his writings were:

- Studio dell'uomo ne' suoi rapporti con Dio (1788)
- Il capo di famiglia istruito nell verita della fede, della morale e del culto religioso (1804)
- Compendio della storia sacra e politica di Ferrara (18038, 6 volumes)
- Sullo spirito della democrazia filosofica in materia di religione e costumi (1816)
- Il secondo ed ultimo tempio della nazione giudaica (1819)
