= Nikola Stipić =

Serbian footballer

Personal information
- Full name: Nikola Stipić
- Date of birth: 18 December 1937 (age 88)
- Place of birth: Bihać, Kingdom of Yugoslavia
- Position: Right winger

Senior career*
Years	Team	Apps	(Gls)
1956–1964	Red Star Belgrade	79	(15)

International career
1962	Yugoslavia	1	(0)
- * Club domestic league appearances and goals

Nikola Stipić (born 18 December 1937) is a former Serbian footballer.

== Club career ==
He started to play for Red Star Belgrade still in the youth teams, debuting for the first team in the 1956/57 season. He had an excellent start becoming known for his speed, great technical skills and dribbling, but his career suddenly came to an end because of a heavy knee injury having only 26 years old.

== International career ==
He made one appearance for Yugoslavia, coming on as a second-half substitute for Vladimir Lukarić in a September 1962 friendly match against Ethiopia.

== Post-playing career ==
Afterward he became a journalist of the Belgrade-based daily Večernje novosti.
