= Francesco Riefolo =

Italian footballer (born 1941)

Personal information
- Date of birth: March 20, 1941 (age 85)
- Place of birth: Bari, Italy
- Position: Defender

Senior career*
Years	Team	Apps	(Gls)
1960–1961	Internazionale	1	(0)
1961–1967	Vis Pesaro	126	(?)
1967–1968	Liberty Bari		
- * Club domestic league appearances and goals

Francesco Riefolo (born March 20, 1941, in Bari) is a retired Italian professional football player.
