= Giuseppe Morosi =

Italian footballer

Personal information
- Date of birth: 12 February 1942 (age 84)
- Place of birth: Agliana, Italy
- Position: Defender

Senior career*
Years	Team	Apps	(Gls)
1960–1961	Inter Milan	1	(0)
1961–1962	Reggiana	27	(0)
1962–1963	Fanfulla	28	(0)
1963–1964	Saronno	32	(0)
1964–1965	Ravenna	33	(0)
1965–1967	Salernitana	25	(0)
1967–1968	Poggibonsi	34	
1968–1969	Lucchese	20	
1969–1974	Aglianese		
- * Club domestic league appearances and goals

Giuseppe Morosi (born 12 February 1942, in Agliana) is an Italian former professional footballer who played as a defender.
