= Antonio Annibale =

Italian footballer (1940-2018)

Personal information
- Date of birth: 10 February 1940
- Place of birth: Milan, Italy
- Date of death: 20 May 2018 (aged 78)
- Height: 1.72 m (5 ft 7 1/2 in)
- Position: Goalkeeper

Senior career*
Years	Team	Apps	(Gls)
1959–1961	Internazionale	4	(0)
1961–1963	Cesena	58	(0)
1963–1964	Lecco	6	(0)
1964–1967	Cesena	99	(0)
1967–1970	Pisa	76	(0)
1970–1972	Cesena	41	(0)
1972–1973	Rimini	10	(0)
- * Club domestic league appearances and goals

Antonio Annibale (10 February 1940 – 20 May 2018) was an Italian footballer.
