= Luigi Mascalaito =

Italian footballer and manager

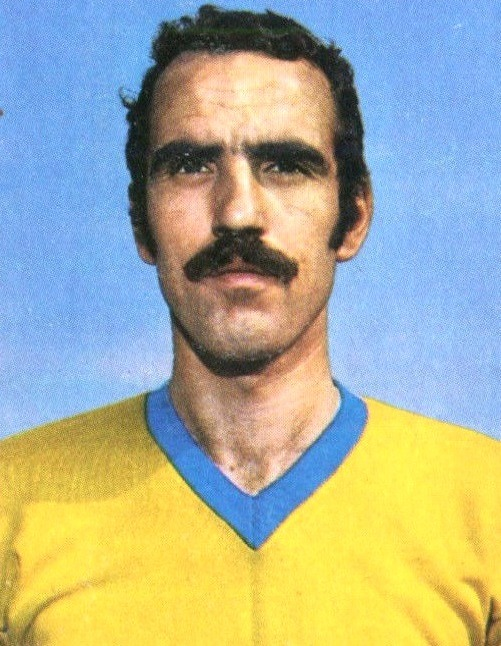

Personal information
- Date of birth: 8 December 1940 (age 85)
- Place of birth: Verona, Italy
- Height: 1.76 m (5 ft 9 1/2 in)
- Position: Forward

Senior career*
Years	Team	Apps	(Gls)
1958–1961	Internazionale	3	(0)
1961–1962	Catanzaro	30	(4)
1962–1963	Cesena	32	(10)
1963–1967	Livorno	130	(34)
1967–1969	Pisa	59	(8)
1969–1974	Verona	129	(1)
1972–1973	Montreal Olympique	8	(1)

Managerial career
- 1974–1979: Verona
- 1979–1981: Fano
- 1981–1984: Ancona
- 1984–1985: Modena
- * Club domestic league appearances and goals

Luigi Mascalaito (born 8 December 1940) is an Italian former professional football player and coach.

As a player, he made 161 appearances in Serie A playing for Internazionale, Pisa and Verona, and a further 222 in Serie B and Serie C with Catanzaro, Cesena, Livorno and Pisa. He then went into management with Verona, and also coached Ancona and Modena.
