= Remo Bicchierai =

Italian footballer

Personal information
- Date of birth: 18 August 1938
- Place of birth: Florence, Italy
- Date of death: 9 March 2018 (aged 79)
- Place of death: Florence, Italy
- Height: 1.78 m (5 ft 10 in)
- Position: Defender

Senior career*
Years	Team	Apps	(Gls)
1956–1957	Empoli	19	(1)
1957–1960	Lecco	91	(0)
1960–1962	Internazionale	3	(0)
1962–1967	Catania	115	(0)
1967–1972	Pistoiese	65	(1)
- * Club domestic league appearances and goals

Remo Bicchierai (18 August 1938 – 9 March 2018) was an Italian professional football player.
