= Enea Masiero =

Italian footballer and coach (1933-2009)

Personal information
- Date of birth: 8 November 1933
- Place of birth: Lonigo, Italy
- Date of death: 31 March 2009 (aged 75)
- Place of death: Milan, Italy
- Height: 1.76 m (5 ft 9 1/2 in)
- Position: Midfielder

Senior career*
Years	Team	Apps	(Gls)
1951–1955	Marzotto Valdagno	88	(5)
1955–1964	Internazionale	140	(9)
1964–1967	Sampdoria	55	(0)
1967–1968	Marzotto Valdagno	2	(0)

Managerial career
- 1970–1971: Internazionale (assistant coach)
- 1972–1973: Internazionale
- 1973–1974: Internazionale
- 1977–1978: Salernitana
- 1978–1979: Solbiatese
- Lugano
- 1981–1982: Brindisi
- 1982–1983: Mantova
- 1991–1992: Internazionale (primavera)
- * Club domestic league appearances and goals

Enea Masiero (8 November 1933 in Lonigo – 31 March 2009 in Milan) was an Italian professional football player and coach, who played as a midfielder.

== Honours ==
=== Club ===
Inter

- Serie A champion: 1962–63
