= Ottavio Bugatti =

Italian footballer (1928–2016)

Personal information
- Date of birth: 25 September 1928
- Place of birth: Lentate sul Seveso, Kingdom of Italy
- Date of death: 13 September 2016 (aged 87)
- Height: 1.70 m (5 ft 7 in)
- Position: Goalkeeper

Senior career*
Years	Team	Apps	(Gls)
1949–1951	Seregno	36+?	(-?)
1951–1953	SPAL	72	(-87)
1953–1961	Napoli	256	(-329)
1961–1965	Inter	25	(-15)

International career
1952–1958	Italy	7	(-13)
- * Club domestic league appearances and goals

Ottavio Bugatti (Italian pronunciation: [otˈtaːvjo buˈɡatti]; 25 September 1928 – 13 September 2016) was an Italian footballer from Lentate sul Seveso, in the province of Milan, who played as a goalkeeper.

== Club career ==
Bugatti played club football for Napoli and Inter; while at Napoli he played himself into the appearance records books at the club, today he is seventh in the club's all-time appearance records for the league. With Inter he won the Italian Championship twice.

== International career ==
At the international level, Bugatti represented Italy seven times, and represented the nation at the 1952 Summer Olympics.

== Cameos ==
In 1961 he appeared in a cameo in Vittorio De Sica's film The Last Judgment, in which he played the part of himself.

== Honours ==
Inter

- Serie A (2): 1962–63, 1964–65
- European Cup (2): 1963–64, 1964–65
- Intercontinental Cup (2): 1964, 1965

== Filmography ==
Bugatti also appeared in a comedy movie.

- 1961 - Il Giudizio universale
