= Mauro Gatti =

Italian footballer and manager

Personal information
- Date of birth: 12 June 1937 (age 89)
- Place of birth: Florence, Italy
- Height: 1.74 m (5 ft 8 1/2 in)
- Position: Defender

Senior career*
Years	Team	Apps	(Gls)
1957–1958	Fanfulla		
1958–1959	Reggiana	38	(0)
1959–1961	Internazionale	43	(2)
1961–1966	Napoli	118	(5)
1966–1973	Padova	187	(1)

Managerial career
- 1972–1974: Padova
- 1983–1984: Giorgione
- * Club domestic league appearances and goals

Mauro Gatti (born 12 June 1937 in Florence) is a retired Italian professional football player and coach.

== Honours ==
- Coppa Italia winner: 1961/62.
