= Modena FC 2018 =

Modena
- Full name: Modena Football Club 2018 S.r.l.
- Nicknames: I Canarini (The Canaries); I Gialloblù (The Yellow & Blue); I Geminiani (The Geminians)
- Founded: 5 April 1912; 114 years ago (original); 2018 (refounded)
- Stadium: Stadio Alberto Braglia
- Capacity: 21,092
- Owner: Rivetex
- President: Carlo Rivetti
- Head coach: Daniele Galloppa
- League: Serie B
- 2025–26: Serie B, 6th of 20
- Website: modenacalcio.com
| Home colours | Away colours | Third colours |

Modena Football Club 2018, commonly referred to as Modena, is an Italian football club based in Modena, Emilia-Romagna. The club was founded in 1912, and refounded in 2018, having spent the majority of its existence playing in Serie B. They play in Serie B, having won 2021–22 Serie C's Group B title.

== History ==
=== Foundation and early years ===
Modena Football Club was formed in on 5 April 1912 as the result of a merging between existing Modenese clubs, Football Club Audax Modena and l' Associazione Studentesca del Calcio Modena. The new colours were to be yellow and blue. Modena's first friendly match was played on 3 November 1912 in the Piazza d'Armi against Venezia.

Modena first took part Italian football league in 1912–13, where they competed in the top division. These early years saw the purchase of Attilio Fresia, perhaps the greatest player in the club's history. During the period of the first world war, the team won the 1916 Coppa Federale.

In 1920–21, Modena lost 4–0 in the championship semi-finals to Alessandria. In the years following, there was a period of disorganization in Italian football and Modena found itself at odds with the Italian Football Federation (FIGC) and moved to the CI Comitato Calcistico Italiano along with Internazionale, Venezia, Torino, Genoa and others. In 1929–30, their first in Serie A (then a single round consisting of 18 teams), the club finished in 12th place with 30 points.

In 1931–32 came the club's first relegation to Serie B, where they remained until 1937. The 1936–37 season featured the inauguration of Modena's new stadium, dedicated to Cesare Marzari, a former gialloblu played killed in the war in Africa. During these years, the name was changed to Modena Calcio following directives of the regime aimed at eliminating all foreign words in the sports lexicon. In the 1937–38 season, there was a return to Serie A led by the Hungarian player/coach János Nehadoma. The following season, Modena escaped relegation by just one point. The 1939–40 campaign was the year when the numbers first appeared on the shirts of players, but at the end of the season, the yellow and blue were relegated to Serie B.

=== 1940s, 50s and 60s ===
In 1940–41, Modena returned to Serie A despite World War II considerably reducing the workforce. The following year, they fell back to Serie B. At the end of the war, however, Modena finished third in Serie A, just behind Torino and Juventus. Following the resignation of both the president and coach in 1948–49, however, the squad was relegated back to Serie B.

The club remained in Serie B throughout the 1950s. Tenor Luciano Pavarotti played on the team, making several appearances as a winger. In 1957–58, Zenit became the sponsor of the team, providing 100 million lira for promotion to Serie A, but the team finished only in seventh place. In 1959–60, the sponsor withdrew and the team was relegated to Serie C for the first time.

The 1960s began with Modena in Serie C. In 1960–61, under coach Malagoli, the team was promoted to Serie B, and the next year found Modena back in the top flight due in large part to the efforts of striker Enrico Pagliari (26 goals in 2 seasons). The following year, thanks mainly to the Brazilian Chinesinho, Modena achieved safety in Serie A, but in 1963–64, despite the return of Sergio Brighenti, Modena fell back to Serie B after a playoff defeat to Sampdoria played in Milan. For the remainder of the 1960s, the club played in Serie B.

=== 1970s, 80s and 90s ===
In 1971–72, after changing three coaches, Modena again fell down to Serie C. Following consecutive seventh-place finishes in Serie C, Modena finally was promoted back to Serie B in 1974–75. In 1976–77, Modena achieved safety in Serie B only by beating Monza on the last day of the season. 1977–78 saw a corporate crisis in which the club was relegated to Serie C. In the following season, it was relegated even further down to Serie C2, its lowest point since the club was founded.

The beginning of the 1980s saw Modena back to Serie C1 and out of its economic crisis. Modena even won the Anglo-Italian Cup in 1981 and 1982. In 1985–86, they returned to Serie B behind the 21 goals scored by Sauro Frutti. In the following season, the club was dramatically saved from relegation on the final day, beating local rivals Bologna in the derby. But in 1987–88, Modena were again relegated to Serie C1.

The 1989–90 season saw Modena promoted back to Serie B, led by their manager Renzo Ulivieri and goalkeeper Marco Ballotta who allowed a record low 9 goals conceded in 34 games. In 1991–92, following the departure of Ulivieri for Vicenza, Modena was again saved from relegation on the final day, beating Messina 2–1. The rest of the decade saw the club in tumultuous financial and sporting position, as in 1993–94 the team was relegated to C1. A year later, Modena was surprisingly relegated to C2 after losing a play-out with Massese, however the club was rescued by the FIGC due to another team's penalty, ensuring Modena's status in C1. The following year, only a loss to Lumezzane in the play-offs denied the club's promotion.

=== 2000s to 2017 and beyond ===
In 2000–01, despite the death of the chairman Luigi Montagnani in the summer, the team begins a cycle of two great years: first promoted from Serie C1 to Serie B and the following year the club returned to Serie A for the first time in 38 years. Modena begin their stint back in the top flight with a humbling 0–3 defeat at the hand of Milan, but followed it up with a historic 2–1 victory against Roma at the Stadio Olimpico. The rest of the season was difficult, however, Modena secured its Serie A status on the last day of the season. The following season saw the club finish third from bottom on 30 points to be sent back to Serie B where they remained until their relegation to the third division at the end of the 2015-16 season.

On 5 November 2017, Modena was declared bankrupt after failing to pay player wages or stadium bills, which brought about a player strike and a stadium lockout. The club had not attended the previous three Serie C matches, including the match against Santarcangelo Calcio; with a total of four matches not attended, the club were officially excluded from "Lega Pro" on 6 November.

Following that, Modena Mayor Gian Carlo Muzzarelli issued a public manifestation of interest to entrepreneurs interested in reviving football in Modena by forming a new club to take the vacancy left by the dissolution of the Canarini. The task fell to former club president Romano Amadei, who re-founded the club and registered it in time for the 2018–19 Serie D. Former Modena sports director Doriano Tosi returned and former manager Luigi Apolloni, who gained promotion to Serie C with Parma in 2016, was appointed manager. Former Modena player Armando Perna was the first signing of the newborn side.

Modena ended the season in first place, together with Pergolettese; this forced a one-legged playoff to be hold, which ended in a 1–2 loss for the Canarini. However, Modena were readmitted to Serie C in July 2019 to fill a league vacancy.

In 2022, Modena finally won back a spot in the Italian second division, following a successful 2021–22 Serie C season under the guidance of experienced manager Attilio Tesser which saw them winning the Group B title with a two-point margin over rivals Reggiana.

== Recent seasons ==
| Season | Division | Tier | Pos | Pl | W | D | L | + | - | P | Cup | Note |
|---|---|---|---|---|---|---|---|---|---|---|---|---|
| 2016–17 | Lega Pro (Group B) | III | 14 | 38 | 11 | 11 | 16 | 31 | 35 | 44 | 2nd round | |
| 2017–18 | Serie C (Group B) | III | ↓ 19 | 0 | 0 | 0 | 0 | 0 | 0 | 0 | – | Excluded and dissolved mid-season due to financial issues |
| 2018–19 | Serie D (Group D) | IV | ↑ 2 | 34 | 21 | 10 | 3 | 60 | 27 | 73 | – | Promoted to Serie C after both Palermo and Foggia were demoted to Serie D |
| 2019–20 | Serie C (Group B) | III | 8 | 27 | 11 | 7 | 9 | 29 | 25 | 40 | – | Did not participate in the Promotion play-offs despite qualifying |
| 2020–21 | Serie C (Group B) | III | 4 | 38 | 21 | 7 | 10 | 51 | 28 | 70 | 1st round | Eliminated in the Promotion play-offs quarterfinals to AlbinoLeffe |
| 2021–22 | Serie C (Group B) | III | ↑ 1 | 38 | 27 | 7 | 4 | 69 | 25 | 88 | – | Promoted to Serie B |
| 2022–23 | Serie B | II | 10 | 38 | 13 | 9 | 16 | 47 | 53 | 48 | 2nd round | |
| 2023–24 | Serie B | II | 10 | 38 | 10 | 17 | 11 | 41 | 47 | 47 | 1st round | |
| 2024–25 | Serie B | II | 11 | 38 | 10 | 15 | 13 | 48 | 50 | 45 | 1st round | |
| 2025–26 | Serie B | II | 6 | 38 | 15 | 10 | 13 | 49 | 36 | 55 | 1st round | Eliminated in the Promotion play-offs quarterfinals to Juve Stabia |

== Current squad ==
As of 31 October 2026

Note: Flags indicate national team as defined under FIFA eligibility rules; some limited exceptions apply. Players may hold more than one non-FIFA nationality.

| No. | Pos. | Nation | Player |
|---|---|---|---|
| 1 | GK | ARG | Leandro Chichizola (captain) |
| 5 | MF | ITA | Alessandro Sersanti |
| 7 | MF | ITA | Francesco Zampano |
| 8 | MF | ITA | Simone Santoro |
| 9 | FW | ITA | Daniele Montevago |
| 10 | MF | ITA | Giuseppe Caso |
| 11 | FW | ITA | Andrea Belotti |
| 12 | GK | ITA | Andrea Maran |
| 14 | MF | ITA | Tito Fabbri |
| 15 | DF | ITA | Martino Odero |
| 16 | MF | URU | Gastón Brugman |
| 17 | MF | ALB | Kleis Bozhanaj |
| 18 | FW | FRA | Joris Manquant |
| 19 | DF | TOG | Steven Nador |
| 20 | DF | NED | Bryant Nieling |
| 22 | GK | ITA | Leonardo Consiglio |

| No. | Pos. | Nation | Player |
|---|---|---|---|
| 23 | DF | ITA | Francesco Folino (on loan from Cremonese) |
| 24 | DF | CHI | Antonio Cannoni |
| 25 | GK | SUI | Abdullah Laidani |
| 26 | MF | ITA | Antonio Imputato |
| 27 | MF | BRA | Paulo Azzi |
| 28 | DF | ITA | Davide Adorni |
| 29 | FW | ITA | Luca Bacchin |
| 32 | MF | ITA | Wisdom Acquah (on loan from Torino) |
| 33 | FW | BRA | Stênio |
| 34 | DF | ITA | Diego Ronco |
| 37 | DF | ITA | Treasure Egharevba |
| 42 | MF | ITA | Alessandro Bianco |
| 70 | FW | ITA | Giuseppe Ambrosino (on loan from Napoli) |
| 72 | MF | ITA | Giacomo Olzer |
| 73 | MF | ITA | Pietro Arnaboldi |
| 77 | DF | ITA | Daniel Tonoli |

=== Out on loan ===
Note: Flags indicate national team as defined under FIFA eligibility rules; some limited exceptions apply. Players may hold more than one non-FIFA nationality.

| No. | Pos. | Nation | Player |
|---|---|---|---|
| — | GK | ITA | Andrés Celenza (at Cittadella Vis Modena until 30 June 2027) |
| — | GK | ITA | Michele Pezzolato (at Pianese until 30 June 2027) |
| — | DF | FRA | Franck Guiyong (at Treviso until 30 June 2027) |
| — | DF | SLO | Anej Koroša (at Ostiamare until 30 June 2027) |
| — | DF | ITA | Edoardo Olivieri (at Monopoli until 30 June 2027) |

| No. | Pos. | Nation | Player |
|---|---|---|---|
| — | MF | ITA | Carlo Carreri (at Correggese until 30 June 2027) |
| — | MF | FRA | Donel Mampuya (at Paganese until 30 June 2027) |
| — | FW | ITA | Christian Lo Conte (at Brusaporto until 30 June 2027) |
| — | FW | ITA | Taha Zidouh (at Dolomiti Bellunesi until 30 June 2027) |

== Club staff ==
| Position | Name |
|---|---|
| Head coach | (Italy) Daniele Galloppa |
| Assistant head coach | TBC |
| Technical assistant coach | TBC |
| Goalkeeping coach | TBC |
| Athletic coach | TBC |
| Match analyst | TBC |
| Team manager | TBC |
| Mental coach | TBC |
| Head of medical | (Italy) Massimiliano Pergreffi |
| Team doctor | (Italy) Claudio Guicciardi |
| Head of physiotherapist | (Italy) Andrea Martinelli |
| Physiotherapist | (Italy) Jacopo Bigliazzi (Italy) Enrico Corradini |
| Nutritionist | (Italy) Enrico Roseo |
| Kit manager | (Italy) Davide Marzani (Italy) Claudio Pifferi |

== Honours ==
=== League ===
- Serie B (2): 1937–38, 1942–43
- Serie C1 (5): 1960–61, 1974–1975, 1989–1990, 2000–01, 2021–22
- Serie C2 (1): 1979–80

=== Cups ===
- Supercoppa di Serie C (2): 2001, 2022

=== Other Titles ===
- Anglo-Italian Cup (2): 1981, 1982.
- Geneva International Friendship Tournament (1): 1947

== Records ==
- Player with most appearances: Renato Braglia, 484
- Player with most goals: Renato Brighenti, 82
- Largest home win: 6–0 v Livorno, Serie A 1929–30
- Largest home loss: 5–0 v Napoli, Serie A 1929–30
- Largest away win: 0–4 v Venezia, Serie A 1939–40
- Largest away loss: 1–9 v Lazio, Serie A 1931–32

== Divisional movements ==
| Series | Years | Last | Promotions | Relegations |
|---|---|---|---|---|
| A | 13 | 2003–04 | – | ▼6 (1932, 1940, 1942, 1949, 1964, 2004) |
| B | 53 | 2024–25 | ▲5 (1938, 1941, 1943, 1962, 2002) | ▼6 (1960, 1972, 1978, 1988, 1994, 2016) |
| C +C2 | 25 +1 | 2021–22 | ▲6 (1961, 1975, 1986, 1990, 2001, 2022) ▲1 (1980 C2) | ▼1 (1979 C1) ▼1 (2018✟) |
92 out of 93 years of professional football in Italy since 1929
Founding member of the Football League’s First Division in 1921
| D | 1 | 2018–19 | ▲1 (2019) | never |

== Notable former managers ==
- (Hungary) Ferenc Kónya (1924–25)
- (Hungary) János Nehadoma (1936–38)
- (Italy) Umberto Caligaris (1938–39)
- (Italy) Paolo Todeschini (1955–56)
- (Italy) Annibale Frossi (1962–64)
- (Italy) Stefano Angeleri (1973)
- (Italy) Umberto Pinardi (1976–78)
- (Italy) Bruno Giorgi (1981–82)
- (Italy) Luigi Mascalaito (1984–85)
- (Italy) Renzo Ulivieri (1989–91)
- (Italy) Adriano Fedele (1997–98)
- (Italy) Alessandro Scanziani (1997–98)
- (Italy) Paolo Stringara (1998–99)
- (Italy) Gianni De Biasi (1999–03)
- (Italy) Alberto Malesani (2003–04)
- (Italy) Gianfranco Bellotto (2003–04)
- (Italy) Stefano Pioli (2004–06)
- (Italy) Daniele Zoratto (2006–07)
- (Italy) Bortolo Mutti (2007–08)
- (Italy) Daniele Zoratto (2008–09)
- (Italy) Luigi Apolloni (2009–10)
- (Italy) Cristiano Bergodi (2010–11)
- (Italy) Agatino Cuttone (2011–12)
- (Italy) Cristiano Bergodi (2012)
- (Italy) Dario Marcolin (2012–13)
- (Italy) Walter Novellino (2013–15)
- (Italy) Simone Pavan (2015)
- (Argentina) Hernán Crespo (2015–16)
- (Italy) Cristiano Bergodi (2016)
- (Italy) Simone Pavan (2016)
- (Italy) Ezio Capuano (2016–2017)
