= Walter Pontel =

Italian footballer and manager

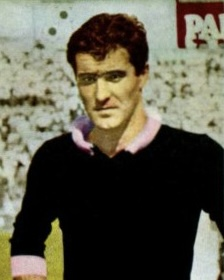

Personal information
- Date of birth: 4 October 1937
- Place of birth: Milan, Italy
- Date of death: 6 January 2003 (aged 65)
- Place of death: Salerno, Italy
- Position: Goalkeeper

Senior career*
Years	Team	Apps	(Gls)
1956–1960	Internazionale	6	(0)
1957–1958	→ Lecco (loan)	13	(0)
1958–1959	→ Palermo (loan)	32	(0)
1960–1961	Catania	7	(0)
1961–1962	Novara	36	(0)
1962–1964	Napoli	46	(0)
1964–1965	Palermo	21	(0)
1965–1967	Padova	55	(0)
1967–1969	Udinese	68	(0)
1969–1970	Viareggio	21	(0)
1970–1971	Pietrasanta		

Managerial career
- 1971–?: Pro Salerno
- Nola
- Sanseverinese
- Trambileno
- Pro Salerno
- * Club domestic league appearances and goals

Walter Pontel (born 4 October 1937 in Milan; died 6 January 2003 in Salerno in a traffic accident) was an Italian professional football player and coach.

== Honours ==
- Coppa Italia winner: 1961/62.
