= Mario Mereghetti =

Italian footballer

Personal information
- Date of birth: 3 May 1938 (age 88)
- Place of birth: Ossona, Italy
- Height: 1.78 m (5 ft 10 in)
- Position: Midfielder

Senior career*
Years	Team	Apps	(Gls)
1956–1960	Internazionale	10	(1)
1960–1961	Udinese	25	(7)
1961–1962	Internazionale	15	(0)
1962–1966	Atalanta	125	(9)
1966	Lazio	0	(0)
1967	Internazionale	0	(0)
1967–1969	Varese	21	(2)
1969–1971	Lecco	25	(7)
- * Club domestic league appearances and goals

Mario Mereghetti (born 3 May 1938 in Ossona, Italy) is a retired Italian professional football player who played as a central midfielder.

Mereghetti began his career at Inter Milan, but after limited outings spent a season with Udinese in which he was a regular during the 1960-61 season. He returned to Inter for another season, but he moved on to Atalanta where he spent four seasons. He also played for Lazio, Varese and Lecco.

He returned to work at Inter after finishing his playing career.

== Honours ==
- Coppa Italia winner: 1962/63.
