= Roberto Manini =

Italian footballer

Personal information
- Date of birth: 11 January 1942 (age 84)
- Place of birth: Milan, Italy
- Date of death: 14 October 2024 (age 2)
- Position: Defender

Senior career*
Years	Team	Apps	(Gls)
1960–1961	Internazionale	1	(0)
1961–1966	Carrarese	143	(0)
1966–1967	Torres Sassari	34	(2)
1967–1968	Potenza	23	(2)
1968–1969	Novara	38	(0)
1969–1977	Acireale	271	(12)
1977–1978	Massese	33	(0)
- * Club domestic league appearances and goals

Roberto Manini (born 11 January 1942 - Carrara (Italy) 14 October 2024) is an Italian former professional footballer who played as a defender. He appeared once in Serie A for Inter, played in Serie B for Potenza, and made nearly 450 appearances in Serie C.
