= Livio Fongaro =

Italian footballer and coach

Personal information
- Date of birth: January 2, 1931
- Place of birth: Valdagno, Italy
- Date of death: 11 July 2007 (aged 76)
- Place of death: Valdagno, Italy
- Height: 1.74 m (5 ft 8 1/2 in)
- Position: Defender

Senior career*
Years	Team	Apps	(Gls)
1950–1955	Marzotto Valdagno	131	(1)
1955–1961	Internazionale	157	(0)
1961–1964	Genoa	68	(2)

Managerial career
- 1967–1968: Genoa
- * Club domestic league appearances and goals

Livio Fongaro (January 2, 1931 in Valdagno – July 11, 2007 in Valdagno) was an Italian professional football player and coach.
