= Egidio Morbello =

Italian footballer (born 1936)

Personal information
- Date of birth: August 19, 1936 (age 90)
- Place of birth: Balzola, Italy
- Height: 1.69 m (5 ft 6 1/2 in)
- Position: Midfielder

Senior career*
Years	Team	Apps	(Gls)
1955–1956	Casale	32	(16)
1956–1957	Alessandria	34	(11)
1957–1958	Roma	5	(0)
1958–1960	SPAL	59	(22)
1960–1963	Internazionale	40	(9)
1963–1968	Messina	42	(2)
- * Club domestic league appearances and goals

Egidio Morbello (born August 19, 1936) is a retired Italian professional football player.

== Honours ==
- Serie A champion: 1962/63.
