= 1961–62 Serie B =

Italian football league season

Serie B
- Season: 1961–62
- Champions: Genoa; 3rd title
- Cup Winners' Cup: Napoli

Serie B 1961-62 team distribution

The Serie B 1961–62 was the thirtieth tournament of this competition played in Italy since its creation.

== Teams ==
Modena, Lucchese and Cosenza had been promoted from Serie C, while Bari, Napoli and Lazio had been relegated from Serie A.

== Final classification ==
Pos	Team	Pld	W	D	L	GF	GA	GR	Pts	Promotion or relegation
1	Genoa (P, C)	38	22	10	6	64	28	2.286	54	Promotion to Serie A
2	Napoli (P, Q)	38	15	13	10	44	35	1.257	43	Cup Winners' Cup and promotion to Serie A
2	Modena (P)	38	15	13	10	39	36	1.083	43	Promotion to Serie A
4	Lazio	38	14	14	10	50	28	1.786	42	
4	Verona	38	14	14	10	39	27	1.444	42	
6	Pro Patria	38	15	11	12	43	38	1.132	41	
7	Messina	38	14	11	13	53	46	1.152	39	
8	Brescia	38	14	9	15	37	36	1.028	37	
8	Simmenthal-Monza	38	13	11	14	37	44	0.841	37	
10	Alessandria	38	13	10	15	45	46	0.978	36	
11	Bari (Note: 6 points deducted.)	38	15	11	12	48	38	1.263	35	
12	Parma	38	9	17	12	25	33	0.758	35	
12	Sambenedettese	38	10	15	13	30	42	0.714	35	
14	Lucchese	38	13	8	17	46	54	0.852	34	
14	Catanzaro	38	9	16	13	37	50	0.740	34	
14	Como	38	11	12	15	33	46	0.717	34	
17	Cosenza	38	11	11	16	29	46	0.630	33	
18	Reggiana (R)	38	8	16	14	34	40	0.850	32	Relegation to Serie C
18	Prato (R)	38	9	14	15	33	47	0.702	32	Relegation to Serie C
20	Novara (Note: Ranked last by the FIGC for a corruption case.) (D, R)	38	12	12	14	37	43	0.860	36	Relegation to Serie C

Source: Panini
(C) Champions; (D) Disqualified; (P) Promoted; (Q) Qualified for the phase indicated; (R) Relegated

== Results ==
Home \ Away	ALE	BAR	BRE	CTZ	COM	COS	GEN	LAZ	LUC	MES	MOD	NAP	NOV	PAR	PRA	PPA	REA	SBN	SMN	HEL
Alessandria		1–1	1–0	2–0	1–1	3–0	0–2	2–0	2–0	3–2	1–1	0–0	2–0	0–0	1–1	0–0	2–1	2–1	0–1	1–0
Bari	3–2		0–1	4–2	1–0	2–0	0–1	0–0	3–0	2–0	2–0	1–0	3–1	1–2	4–0	1–1	3–1	0–0	4–1	0–0
Brescia	0–3	1–0		1–2	1–0	1–1	2–0	1–0	2–0	2–1	0–1	1–1	2–0	1–0	0–1	2–0	2–1	4–0	0–1	0–3
Catanzaro	2–0	3–0	1–0		2–1	1–1	0–0	1–1	2–1	0–0	2–2	1–2	2–2	0–0	0–0	1–1	1–1	1–0	2–1	1–3
Como	4–2	0–3	1–0	4–0		2–1	1–0	0–0	2–1	0–0	0–4	1–1	1–1	1–1	0–1	2–0	1–0	2–0	0–0	1–1
Cosenza	1–0	1–0	0–0	0–0	3–0		1–0	2–2	2–1	1–0	0–2	1–1	1–0	1–0	1–1	2–1	0–1	1–0	3–1	0–1
Genoa	1–0	0–0	2–2	1–1	2–1	2–0		2–0	4–2	3–0	5–1	3–1	2–0	3–0	4–1	2–2	3–1	4–2	1–0	2–1
Lazio	7–2	5–0	0–0	1–0	1–1	3–0	0–0		1–1	4–1	1–0	0–0	1–1	3–0	4–0	0–2	1–0	3–0	4–0	1–1
Lucchese	2–0	1–2	1–2	2–1	2–0	3–0	0–2	1–0		2–1	1–1	0–1	3–0	3–0	2–0	3–2	3–1	1–1	1–0	1–1
Messina	2–0	3–2	2–2	5–1	2–0	3–0	2–1	1–2	4–2		4–1	2–0	0–1	2–0	2–2	0–0	0–0	2–1	1–0	4–1
Modena	0–0	3–1	1–0	3–2	1–0	2–1	0–0	0–1	4–0	1–0		0–0	1–0	0–0	2–0	1–2	1–0	0–0	1–3	1–0
Napoli	4–3	0–0	1–1	3–1	3–1	1–1	1–4	0–2	1–0	4–2	2–0		1–0	0–0	2–1	4–0	0–1	2–0	0–0	0–0
Novara	0–2	3–1	2–1	3–2	0–0	3–1	0–0	1–0	3–0	2–2	0–0	2–1		1–0	1–0	0–0	0–0	0–2	0–1	0–0
Parma	1–0	1–1	1–0	0–0	4–0	2–0	0–0	0–0	1–1	2–1	0–0	0–2	2–3		2–1	2–1	2–0	0–0	0–1	0–2
Prato	0–4	1–2	2–0	3–0	0–1	1–1	0–1	0–0	2–0	0–0	1–1	1–1	2–2	0–0		1–0	1–1	2–0	3–1	1–0
Pro Patria	2–0	1–0	1–0	0–0	2–0	0–0	2–2	4–1	0–1	0–1	0–1	2–1	1–0	2–0	2–1		0–3	2–1	2–2	0–1
Reggiana	1–1	0–0	1–1	0–0	0–0	1–0	1–2	0–0	0–0	3–0	3–0	2–1	2–1	1–1	1–1	1–1		1–2	0–1	1–1
Sambenedettese	2–1	0–0	1–0	0–0	1–1	2–1	2–1	1–0	2–2	0–0	0–0	1–0	1–1	0–0	2–0	1–2	2–2		1–1	1–0
Simm.-Monza	1–1	0–0	2–3	1–2	2–3	0–0	0–2	2–1	3–1	1–1	2–0	0–1	2–1	0–0	1–1	0–4	1–0	3–0		1–0
Hellas Verona	2–0	2–1	1–1	1–0	2–0	3–0	1–0	1–0	1–1	0–0	2–2	0–1	1–2	1–1	1–0	0–1	4–1	0–0	0–0	

Source: Almanacco Illustrato del Calcio - La Storia 1898-2004, Panini Edizioni, Modena, September 2005 (in Italian)
Legend: Blue = home team win; Yellow = draw; Red = away team win.

== References and sources ==
- Almanacco Illustrato del Calcio - La Storia 1898-2004, Panini Edizioni, Modena, September 2005
