= 1962 Inter-Cities Fairs Cup final =

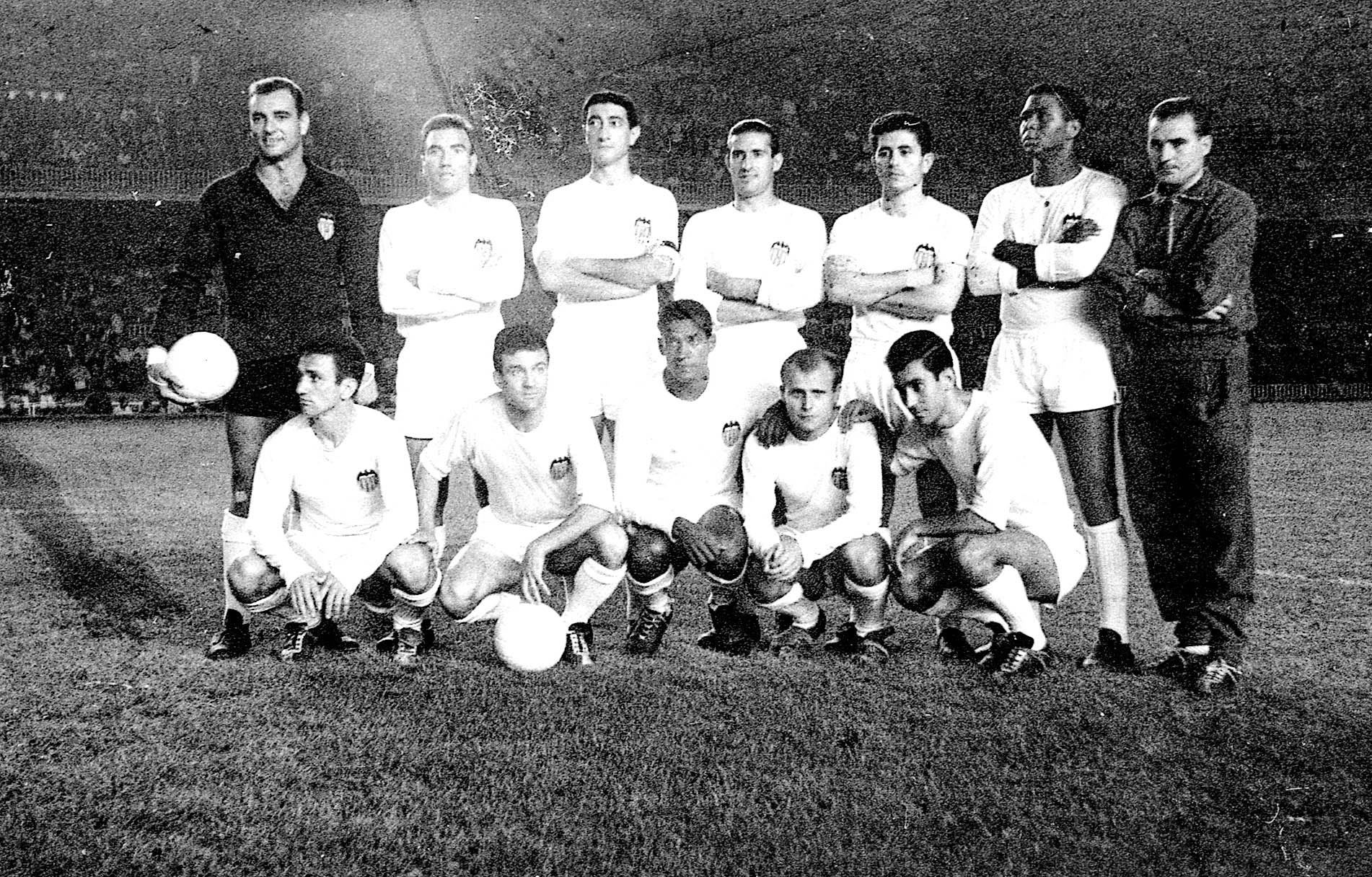
- Valencia, champions
- Event: 1961–62 Inter-Cities Fairs Cup
Valencia	Barcelona
(Spain)	(Spain)
7	3
- on aggregate

First leg
Valencia	Barcelona
6	2
- Date: 8 September 1962
- Venue: Estadio Mestalla, Valencia
- Referee: Joseph Barberan, (France)
- Attendance: 65,000

Second leg
Barcelona	Valencia
1	1
- Date: 12 September 1962
- Venue: Camp Nou, Barcelona
- Referee: Giulio Campanati, (Italy)
- Attendance: 60,000

The 1962 Inter-Cities Fairs Cup final was the final of the fourth Inter-Cities Fairs Cup. It was played on 8 September and 12 September 1962 between Valencia and Barcelona of Spain, it was the first time that two football teams from the same country had contested a European final. It was Valencia's first major European trophy.

Valencia won the tie 7–3 on aggregate after winning the first leg by wide margin, although they were losing twice before getting the win. The second leg ended in a tie.

== Route to the final ==
Valencia				Round	Barcelona			
Opponent	Agg.	1st leg	2nd leg		Opponent	Agg.	1st leg	2nd leg
(England) Nottingham Forest	7–1	2–0 (H)	5–1 (A)	First round	(West Germany) West Berlin XI	3–1	0–1 (A)	3–0 (H)
(Switzerland) Lausanne-Sport	4–3	4–3 (H)	not played	Second round	(Socialist Federal Republic of Yugoslavia) Dinamo Zagreb	7–3	5–1 (H)	2–2 (A)
(Italy) Internazionale	5–3	2–0 (H)	3–3 (A)	Quarter-finals	(England) Sheffield Wednesday	4–3	2–3 (A)	2–0 (H)
(Hungary) MTK Budapest	10–3	3–0 (H)	7–3 (A)	Semi-finals	(Socialist Federal Republic of Yugoslavia) Crvena zvezda	6–1	2–0 (A)	4–1 (H)

== Match details ==
=== First leg ===
8 September 1962

Valencia (Spain)	6–2	(Spain) Barcelona
Yosu 14' 42'; Guillot 35' 54' 67'; Núñez 74'	Report	Kocsis 4' 20'

Estadio Mestalla, Valencia
Attendance: 65,000
Referee: Joseph Barberan, (France)

Valencia

Barcelona

Valencia:
GK	1	(Spain) Ricardo Zamora de Grassa
DF		(Spain) Vicente Piquer
DF		(Spain) Quincoces
DF		(Spain) Manuel Mestre
MF		(Spain) José Sastre
MF		(Brazil) Chicão
FW		(Uruguay) Héctor Núñez
FW		(Spain) Enric Ribelles
FW		(Brazil) Waldo
FW		(Spain) Vicente Guillot
FW		(Spain) Nando Yosu
Manager:
(Argentina) Alejandro Scopelli

Barcelona:
GK	1	(Spain) José Manuel Pesudo
DF		(Uruguay) Julio César Benítez
DF		(Spain) Sígfrid Gràcia
		(Spain) Rodri
		(Spain) Ferran Olivella
MF		(Spain) Martí Vergés
FW		(Uruguay) Luis Cubilla
FW		(Hungary) Sándor Kocsis
FW		(Paraguay) Cayetano Ré
FW		(Uruguay) Ramón Alberto Villaverde
FW		(Spain) Antonio Camps
Manager:
(Spain) (Note: Kubala, who was born in Hungary and had previously represented both Czechoslovakia and Hungary internationally as a player, adopted Spanish nationality, having fled communist rule in his homeland in 1948 and subsequently taken refuge in Spain. Kubala's player Sándor Kocsis was also born in Hungary, but unlike his manager, Kocsis never changed allegiances to Spain.) László Kubala

=== Second leg ===
12 September 1962

Barcelona (Spain)	1–1	(Spain) Valencia
Kocsis 46'		Guillot 87'

Camp Nou, Barcelona
Attendance: 60,000
Referee: Giulio Campanati, (Italy)

Barcelona

Valencia

Barcelona:
GK	1	(Spain) José Manuel Pesudo
(Uruguay) Julio César Benítez
(Spain) Jesús Garay
(Spain) Josep Maria Fusté
(Spain) Martí Vergés
(Spain) Sígfrid Gràcia
(Uruguay) Luis Cubilla
(Hungary) Sándor Kocsis
(Belgium) Fernand Goyvaerts
(Uruguay) Ramón Alberto Villaverde
(Spain) Antonio Camps
Manager:
(Spain) László Kubala

Valencia:
GK	1	(Spain) Ricardo Zamora de Grassa
(Spain) Vicente Piquer
(Spain) Manuel Mestre
(Spain) José Sastre
(Spain) Quincoces
(Brazil) Chicão
(Uruguay) Héctor Núñez
(Spain) José Antonio Urtiaga
(Brazil) Waldo
(Spain) Vicente Guillot
(Spain) Nando Yosu
Manager:
(Argentina) Alejandro Scopelli

Valencia CF win 7–3 on aggregate

== See also ==
- 1961–62 Inter-Cities Fairs Cup
- Valencia CF in European football
- FC Barcelona in international football competitions
- Spanish football clubs in international competitions
