= 1955 Small Club World Cup =

Tournament details
- Host country: Venezuela
- Dates: 7 July – 4 August
- Teams: 4 (from 2 associations)
- Venue: 1 (in 1 host city)

Final positions
- Champions: (Brazil) São Paulo (1st title)

Tournament statistics
- Matches played: 12
- Goals scored: 40 (3.33 per match)
- Top scorer: (Argentina) Rubén Padín (6 goals)

The 1955 Small Club World Cup was the fourth edition of the Small Club World Cup, a tournament held in Venezuela between 1952 and 1957, in certain years between 1963 and 1970, and in 1975. It was played by four participants, half from Europe and half from South America in double round robin format and featured players like Mario Coluna, José Águas, goalkeeper Costa Pereira for Benfica, Dino Sani, Nílton de Sordi for Sao Paulo, Dutch Faas Wilkes and Pasieguito for Valencia.

As Milan and Real Madrid declined to participate, they were replaced by Spanish club Valencia and local team La Salle. On the other hand, Brazilian club São Paulo's participation was part of a tour that also included Colombia and Mexico, while Valencia became the third Spanish team to visit Venezuela, after Real Madrid and Barcelona.

The tournament was organised by Spanish entrepreneurs Damián Gaubeka and Pedro Reyes, and named "Copa General de Brigada Marcos Pérez Jiménez" by the press, which never mentioned it as "Pequeña Copa del Mundo". Argentine striker Rubén Padín of La Salle (who had been loaned from Cúcuta Deportivo to play this tournament exclusively) was the topscorer with 6 goals.

== Participants ==
Team	Qualification
(Portugal) Benfica	Champions of 1954–55 Primeira Divisão
(Spain) Valencia	5th. in 1954–55 La Liga
(Brazil) São Paulo	4th. in 1954 Campeonato Paulista
(Venezuela) La Salle	Champions of Venezuelan Primera División

== Matches ==
Jul 17

Valencia (Spain)	4–3	(Portugal) Benfica
Buqué 3'; Pasieguito 43'; Wilkes 52'; Fuertes 69'	Report	Arsénio 30'; Águas 46', 80'

Estadio Olímpico, Caracas
Attendance: 40,000
Referee: Benito Jackson (Venezuela)

Jul 17

La Salle (Venezuela)	4–1	(Brazil) São Paulo
Alfredo 11' (o.g.); Padín 31', 33', 56'	Report	Paraíba 43'

Estadio Olímpico, Caracas
Attendance: 15,000
Referee: Dellow (England)

Jul 19

La Salle (Venezuela)	1–1	(Spain) Valencia
Padín 35'	Report	Mañó 58'

Estadio Olímpico, Caracas
Referee: Dellow (England)

Jul 21

Benfica (Portugal)	0–0	(Brazil) São Paulo
	Report

Estadio Olímpico, Caracas
Referee: Héctor Osorio (Venezuela)

Jul 23

La Salle (Venezuela)	1–4	(Portugal) Benfica
Padín 25'	Report	Arsénio 60'; Salvador 66'; Chano 65' (o.g.); Calado 81'

Estadio Olímpico, Caracas
Referee: Dellow (England)

Jul 24

São Paulo (Brazil)	2–0	(Spain) Valencia
Dino Sani 5'; Gino 70'	Report

Estadio Olímpico, Caracas
Referee: Benito Jackson (Venezuela)

Jul 26

São Paulo (Brazil)	4–2	(Portugal) Benfica
Dino Sani 23', 50'; Maurinho 55'; Teixeirinha 83'	Report	Salvador 62'; Caiado 87'

Estadio Olímpico, Caracas
Referee: Teo Hernández (Venezuela)

Jul 28

La Salle (Venezuela)	0–4	(Spain) Valencia
	Report	Fuertes 2'; Vila 9'; Seguí 55', 85'

Estadio Olímpico, Caracas
Referee: Dellow (England)

Jul 30

La Salle (Venezuela)	1–3	(Brazil) São Paulo
Padín 87'	Report	Lanzoninho 40'; Gino 57'; Dino Sani 62'

Estadio Olímpico, Caracas
Referee: Dellow (England)

Jul 31

Benfica (Portugal)	2–1	(Spain) Valencia
Águas 11', 70'	Report	Pasieguito 32'

Estadio Olímpico, Caracas
Referee: Héctor Osorio (Venezuela)

Aug 2

La Salle (Venezuela)	0–0	(Portugal) Benfica
	Report

Estadio Olímpico, Caracas
Referee: Dellow (England)

Aug 4

São Paulo (Brazil)	1–1	(Spain) Valencia
Lanzoninho 18'	Report	Mañó 50'

Estadio Olímpico, Caracas
Referee: Benito Jackson (Venezuela)

== Final standings ==
Team	Pts	P	W	D	L	GF	GA	GD
(Brazil) São Paulo	7	6	3	2	1	11	8	3
(Spain) Valencia	6	6	2	2	2	11	9	2
(Portugal) Benfica	6	6	2	2	2	11	10	1
(Venezuela) La Salle	4	6	1	2	3	7	13	-6

== Topscorers ==
Rank	Player	Club	Goals
1	(Argentina) Rubén Padín	(Venezuela) La Salle	6
2	(Brazil) Dino Sani	(Brazil) São Paulo	4

== Champion ==
1955 Small Club World Cup
(Second Brazilian Republic)
São Paulo
1st. title
