= 1962–63 Inter-Cities Fairs Cup =

Tournament details
- Teams: 32

Final positions
- Champions: (Spain) Valencia (2nd title)
- Runners-up: (Socialist Federal Republic of Yugoslavia) Dinamo Zagreb

Tournament statistics
- Matches played: 66
- Goals scored: 211 (3.2 per match)
- Top scorer(s): (Argentina) Pedro Manfredini (Argentina) Francisco Lojacono (Brazil) Waldo Machado (6 goals each)

The fifth Inter-Cities Fairs Cup was played over the 1962–63 season. There were five representative teams for some major European cities, four of which lost out in the first round. Valencia defeated Dinamo Zagreb over two legs to defend their title.

== First round ==
Team 1	Agg.	Team 2	1st leg	2nd leg
Sampdoria (Italy)	3–0	(Luxembourg) Aris Bonnevoie	1–0	2–0
Viktoria Köln (West Germany)	5–7	(Hungary) Ferencváros	4–3	1–4
Petrolul Ploiești (Romania)	5–0	(Czechoslovakia) Spartak ZJŠ Brno	4–0	1–0
Vojvodina (Socialist Federal Republic of Yugoslavia)	1–2	(East Germany) Leipzig XI	1–0	0–2
Basel XI (Switzerland)	0–6	(West Germany) Bayern Munich	0–3	0–3^{1}
Drumcondra (Republic of Ireland)	6–5	(Denmark) Odense XI	4–1	2–4
Porto (Portugal)	1–2	(Socialist Federal Republic of Yugoslavia) Dinamo Zagreb	1–2	0–0
Marseille (France)	3–4	(Belgium) Union Saint-Gilloise	1–0	2–4
Valencia (Spain)	6–4	(Scotland) Celtic	4–2	2–2
Everton (England)	1–2	(Scotland) Dunfermline Athletic	1–0	0–2
Utrecht XI (Netherlands)	5–3	(West Germany) Tasmania Berlin	3–2	2–1
Hibernian (Scotland)	7–2	(Denmark) Copenhagen XI	4–0	3–2
Glentoran (Northern Ireland)	2–8	(Spain) Zaragoza	0–2	2–6
Altay (Turkey)	3–13	(Italy) Roma	2–3	1–10
Rapid Wien (Austria)	1–2	(Socialist Federal Republic of Yugoslavia) Red Star Belgrade	1–1	0–1
Belenenses (Portugal)	2–2^{2}	(Spain) Barcelona	1–1	1–1

^{1}Basel withdrew from the second leg, which was then awarded 3–0 for Bayern Munich.

^{2}Barcelona progressed to the Second round after winning a play-off match 3–2.

=== First leg ===
12 September 1962

Utrecht XI (Netherlands)	3–2	(West Germany) Tasmania Berlin
Geurtsen 6', 77'; Siahaya 61'	Report	Greuel 43'; Neumann 55'

Stadion Galgenwaard, Utrecht
Attendance: 7,300
Referee: George McCabe (England)

26 September 1962

Sampdoria (Italy)	1–0	(Luxembourg) Aris Bonnevoie
Brighenti 36'	Report

Stadio Luigi Ferraris, Genoa
Attendance: 2,500
Referee: Félix Birigay Nieva (Spain)

26 September 1962

Altay (Turkey)	2–3	(Italy) Roma
Nazmi 19', 55'	Report	Orlando 20'; Lojacono 32'; Menichelli 41'

Alsancak Mustafa Denizli Stadium, İzmir
Attendance: 4,500
Referee: Faruk Talu (Turkey)

26 September 1962

Marseille (France)	1–0	(Belgium) Union Saint-Gilloise
Sansonetti 63'	Report

Stade Vélodrome, Marseille
Attendance: 1,000
Referee: Karl Keller (Switzerland)

26 September 1962

Valencia (Spain)	4–2	(Scotland) Celtic
Coll 9', 26'; Guillot 31', 46'	Report	Carroll 27', 74'

Mestalla Stadium, Valencia
Attendance: 25,000
Referee: François Eurdekian (France)

26 September 1962

Glentoran (Northern Ireland)	0–2	(Spain) Zaragoza
	Report	Borne 40' (o.g.); Duca 85'

The Oval, Belfast
Attendance: 7,000
Referee: William Mullan (Scotland)

3 October 1962

Drumcondra (Republic of Ireland)	4–1	(Denmark) Odense XI
Dixon 12', 38'; Morrissey 26'; McCann 79'	Report	Bruun 74'

Tolka Park, Dublin
Attendance: 12,000
Referee: Alan Howells (Wales)

3 October 1962

Petrolul Ploiești (Romania)	4–0	(Czechoslovakia) Spartak ZJŠ Brno
Dridea 6'; Badea 38', 40'; Tabarcea 58'	Report

Stadionul Petrolul, Ploiești
Attendance: 11,000
Referee: Gyula Balla (Hungary)

3 October 1962

Viktoria Köln (West Germany)	4–3	(Hungary) Ferencváros
Rühl 16'; Kremer 19'; Matischak 25', 33' (pen.)	Report	Mátrai 6'; Albert 31', 53'

Sportpark Höhenberg, Cologne
Attendance: 20,000
Referee: Joseph Barbéran (France)

3 October 1962

Vojvodina (Socialist Federal Republic of Yugoslavia)	1–0	(East Germany) Leipzig XI
Pavlić 23'	Report

Gradski Stadion, Novi Sad
Attendance: 6,000
Referee: Atanas Stavrev (Bulgaria)

3 October 1962

Porto (Portugal)	1–2	(Socialist Federal Republic of Yugoslavia) Dinamo Zagreb
Serafim 26'	Report	Ribić 44'; Pašić 55'

Estádio das Antas, Porto
Attendance: 33,000
Referee: Gennaro Marchese (Italy)

3 October 1962

Hibernian (Scotland)	4–0	(Denmark) Copenhagen XI
Byrne 17'; Baker 20'; Stevenson 24'; Rønnow 30' (o.g.)	Report

Easter Road, Edinburgh
Attendance: 10,000
Referee: Joseph Hannet (Belgium)

10 October 1962

Rapid Wien (Austria)	1–1	(Socialist Federal Republic of Yugoslavia) Red Star Belgrade
Flögel 48'	Report	Kostić 75'

Praterstadion, Vienna
Attendance: 20,000
Referee: Jean Tricot (France)

16 October 1962

Basel (Switzerland)	0–3	(West Germany) Bayern Munich
	Report	Brenninger 41', 70'; Drescher 86'

St. Jakob Stadium, Basel
Attendance: 5,800
Referee: Norman Mootz (Luxembourg)

24 October 1962

Everton (England)	1–0	(Scotland) Dunfermline Athletic
Stevens 25'	Report

Goodison Park, Liverpool
Attendance: 40,240
Referee: John Meighan (Ireland)

3 October 1962

Belenenses (Portugal)	1–1	(Spain) Barcelona
Estevão Mansidão 11'		Fusté 8'

Estádio do Restelo, Lisbon
Attendance: 30,000
Referee: Raymond Lespineux (Belgium)

=== Second leg ===
3 October 1962

Aris Bonnevoie (Luxembourg)	0–2	(Italy) Sampdoria
	Report	Silva 52'; Brenner 80' (o.g.)

Stade Camille Polfer, Luxembourg
Attendance: 5,000
Referee: Rudolf Kreitlein (West Germany)

Sampdoria won 3–0 on aggregate.

10 October 1962

Spartak ZJŠ Brno (Czechoslovakia)	0–1	(Romania) Petrolul Ploiești
	Report	Tabarcea 71'

Stadion Za Lužánkami, Brno
Attendance: 2,500
Referee: Taki Wlachojanis (Austria)

Petrolul Ploiești won 5–0 on aggregate.

10 October 1962

Zaragoza (Spain)	6–2	(Northern Ireland) Glentoran
Murillo 20', 28', 66', 79'; Villa 56', 71'	Report	Doherty 7', 81'

La Romareda, Zaragoza
Attendance: 16,000
Referee: Hermínio Soares (Portugal)

Zaragoza won 8–2 on aggregate.

11 October 1962

Barcelona (Spain)	1–1	(Portugal) Belenenses
Ré 11'		Peres 36'

Estadio del Club de Fútbol Barcelona, Barcelona
Attendance: 26,000
Referee: Anton Bucheli (Switzerland)

Aggregate 2–2

17 October 1962

Ferencváros (Hungary)	4–1	(West Germany) Viktoria Köln
Novák 14'; Kökény 67'; Fenyvesi 73'; Albert 80'	Report	Rühl 81'

Üllői úti, Budapest
Attendance: 25,000
Referee: Karl Kainer (Austria)

Ferencváros won 7–5 on aggregate.

17 October 1962

Odense XI (Denmark)	4–2	(Republic of Ireland) Drumcondra
Prole 3' (o.g.); Petersen 6'; Bruun 76'; Jørgensen 85'	Report	Rice 20'; Morrissey 33'

Odense Stadium, Odense
Attendance: 5,200
Referee: Gösta Ackerborn (Sweden)

Drumcondra won 6–4 on aggregate.

17 October 1962

Leipzig XI (East Germany)	2–0	(Socialist Federal Republic of Yugoslavia) Vojvodina
Fischer 3'; Trölitzsch 76' (pen.)	Report

Zentralstadion, Leipzig
Attendance: 25,000
Referee: Milan Kusák (Czechoslovakia)

Leipzig XI won 2–1 on aggregate.

17 October 1962

Dinamo Zagreb (Socialist Federal Republic of Yugoslavia)	0–0	(Portugal) Porto
	Report

Stadion Maksimir, Zagreb
Attendance: 10,000
Referee: Walter Meißner (West Germany)

Dinamo Zagreb won 2–1 on aggregate.

17 October 1962

Union Saint-Gilloise (Belgium)	4–2	(France) Marseille
van Cauwelaert 25'; Mertens 26', 48'; Kialunda 50'	Report	Aygoui 44'; Roy 72'

Joseph Marien Stadium, Forest
Attendance: 3,000
Referee: Karl Keller (Switzerland)

Union Saint-Gilloise won 4–3 on aggregate.

17 October 1962

Tasmania Berlin (West Germany)	1–2	(Netherlands) Utrecht XI
Rosenfeldt 17'	Report	Luiten 33'; van der Linden 35'

Olympiastadion, Berlin
Attendance: 6,000
Referee: Frede Hansen (Denmark)

Utrecht XI won 5–3 on aggregate.

23 October 1962

Copenhagen XI (Denmark)	2–3	(Scotland) Hibernian
Dyremose 17'; Christensen 67'	Report	Byrne 33'; Stevenson 47', 63'

Idrætspark, Copenhagen
Attendance: 4,500
Referee: Laurens van Ravens (Netherlands)

Hibernian won 7–2 on aggregate.

24 October 1962

Celtic (Scotland)	2–2	(Spain) Valencia
Verdú 48' (o.g.); Crerand 85'	Report	Guillot 63'; Waldo 80'

Celtic Park, Glasgow
Attendance: 45,000
Referee: Piet Roomer (Netherlands)

Valencia won 6–4 on aggregate.

31 October 1962

Dunfermline Athletic (Scotland)	2–0	(England) Everton
Miller 5'; Melrose 87'	Report

East End Park, Dunfermline
Attendance: 21,813
Referee: Samuel Carswell (Northern Ireland)

Dunfermline won 2–1 on aggregate.

7 November 1962

Roma (Italy)	10–1	(Turkey) Altay
Manfredini 2', 41', 56', 82'; Jonsson 16', 32'; Lojacono 30' (pen.), 74', 89'; Angelillo 69'	Report	Elmastaşoğlu 55'

Stadio Olimpico, Rome
Attendance: 7,000
Referee: Živko Bajić (Croatia)

Roma won 13–3 on aggregate.

13 November 1962

Red Star Belgrade (Socialist Federal Republic of Yugoslavia)	1–0	(Austria) Rapid Wien
Melić 55'	Report

JNA Stadium, Belgrade
Attendance: 6,200
Referee: Carlo Gambarotta (Italy)

Red Star Belgrade won 2–1 on aggregate.

=== Play-off ===
31 October 1962

Barcelona (Spain)	3–2	(Portugal) Belenenses
Chus Pereda 15'; Benítez 20'; Kocsis 55'		Palico 8', 62'

Estadio del Club de Fútbol Barcelona, Barcelona
Attendance: 23,000
Referee: Albert Guinnard (Switzerland)

Barcelona won 5–4 on aggregate.

== Second round ==
Team 1	Agg.	Team 2	1st leg	2nd leg
Sampdoria (Italy)	1–6	(Hungary) Ferencváros	1–0	0–6
Petrolul Ploiești (Romania)	1–1^{1}	(East Germany) Leipzig XI	1–0	0–1
Bayern Munich (West Germany)	6–1	(Republic of Ireland) Drumcondra	6–0	0–1
Dinamo Zagreb (Socialist Federal Republic of Yugoslavia)	2–2^{2}	(Belgium) Union Saint-Gilloise	2–1	0–1
Valencia (Spain)	6–6^{3}	(Scotland) Dunfermline Athletic	4–0	2–6
Utrecht XI (Netherlands)	1–3	(Scotland) Hibernian	0–1	1–2
Zaragoza (Spain)	4–5	(Italy) Roma	2–4	2–1
Red Star Belgrade (Socialist Federal Republic of Yugoslavia)	3–3^{4}	(Spain) Barcelona	3–2	0–1

^{1} Petrolul Ploiești progressed to the Quarter finals after winning a play-off match 1–0.

^{2} Dinamo Zagreb progressed to the Quarter finals after winning a play-off match 3–2.

^{3} Valencia progressed to the Quarter finals after winning a play-off match 1–0.

^{4} Red Star Belgrade progressed to the Quarter finals after winning a play-off match 1–0.

=== First leg ===
7 November 1962

Petrolul Ploiești (Romania)	1–0	(East Germany) Leipzig XI
A. Munteanu 36'	Report

Stadionul Petrolul, Ploiești
Attendance: 15,000
Referee: Lajos Aranyosi (Hungary)

7 November 1962

Dinamo Zagreb (Socialist Federal Republic of Yugoslavia)	2–1	(Belgium) Union Saint-Gilloise
Zambata 3'; Pašić 64'	Report	Schraepen 75'

Stadion Maksimir, Zagreb
Attendance: 8,500
Referee: Taki Wlachojanis (Austria)

27 November 1962

Utrecht XI (Netherlands)	0–1	(Scotland) Hibernian
	Report	Falconer 11'

Stadion Galgenwaard, Utrecht
Attendance: 10,000
Referee: Jozef Casteleyn (Belgium)

1 December 1962

Sampdoria (Italy)	1–0	(Hungary) Ferencváros
Silva 18'	Report

Stadio Luigi Ferraris, Genoa
Attendance: 10,000
Referee: François Eurdekian (France)

2 December 1962

Zaragoza (Spain)	2–4	(Italy) Roma
Villa 30'; Marcelino 81'	Report	Lojacono 1'; Manfredini 57'; De Sisti 60'; Charles 78'

La Romareda, Zaragoza
Attendance: 21,000
Referee: Henri Faucheux (France)

2 December 1962

Red Star Belgrade (Socialist Federal Republic of Yugoslavia)	3–2	(Spain) Barcelona
Samardžić 57'; Skoblar 65'; Ognjanović 66'	Report	Cubilla 17'; Villaverde 54'

JNA Stadium, Belgrade
Attendance: 10,000
Referee: Joseph Heymann (Switzerland)

4 December 1962

Bayern Munich (Germany)	6–0	(Republic of Ireland) Drumcondra
Ohlhauser 12'; Kosar 47'; Borutta 57'; Brenninger 77'; Grosser 80'; Giesemann 83'	Report

Grünwalder Stadion, Munich
Attendance: 2,500
Referee: Anton Bucheli (Switzerland)

12 December 1962
20:00

Valencia (Spain)	4–0	(Scotland) Dunfermline Athletic
Núñez 2'; Waldo 36'; Ficha 44'; Waldo 51'	Report

Mestalla Stadium, Valencia
Attendance: 25,000
Referee: Joseph Barbéran (France)

=== Second leg ===
21 November 1962

Union Saint-Gilloise (Belgium)	1–0	(Socialist Federal Republic of Yugoslavia) Dinamo Zagreb
van Cauwelaert 43'	Report

Joseph Marien Stadium, Forest
Attendance: 2,000
Referee: Werner Treichel (West Germany)

Aggregate 2–2

28 November 1962

Leipzig XI (East Germany)	1–0	(Romania) Petrolul Ploiești
Fischer 25'	Report

Zentralstadion, Leipzig
Attendance: 30,000
Referee: Alois Obtulovič (Czechoslovakia)

Leipzig XI 1–1 Petrolul Ploiești on aggregate.

12 December 1962

Drumcondra (Republic of Ireland)	1–0	(Germany) Bayern Munich
Dixon 58'	Report

Tolka Park, Dublin
Attendance: 3,500
Referee: Bobby Davidson (Scotland)

Bayern Munich won 6–1 on aggregate.

12 December 1962

Ferencváros (Hungary)	6–0	(Italy) Sampdoria
Kökény 15', 61'; Friedmanszky 16', 60'; Vilezsál 70'; M. Fenyvesi 71'	Report

Üllői úti, Budapest
Attendance: 20,000
Referee: Karl Kainer (Austria)

Ferencváros won 6–1 on aggregate.

12 December 1962

Hibernian (Scotland)	2–1	(Netherlands) Utrecht XI
Baker 23'; Stevenson 48'	Report	Geurtsen 21'

Easter Road, Edinburgh
Attendance: 10,000
Referee: Geoff Powell (Wales)

Hibernian won 3–1 on aggregate.

19 December 1962
19:30

Dunfermline Athletic (Scotland)	6–2	(Spain) Valencia
Edwards 10'; Sinclair 15', 16'; MacLean 33'; Peebles 36'; Smith 66'	Report	Guillot 22'; MacLean 59' (o.g.)

East End Park, Dunfermline
Attendance: 14,826
Referee: James Finney (England)

Aggregate 6–6

19 December 1962

Roma (Italy)	1–2	(Spain) Zaragoza
Angelillo 6'	Report	Corsini 41' (o.g.); Sigi 83'

Stadio Olimpico, Rome
Attendance: 16,000
Referee: Aleksandar Škorić (Yugoslavia)

Roma won 5–4 on aggregate.

19 December 1962

Barcelona (Spain)	1–0	(Socialist Federal Republic of Yugoslavia) Red Star Belgrade
Cubilla 86'	Report

Estadio del Club de Fútbol Barcelona, Barcelona
Attendance: 28,000
Referee: Iginio Rigato (Italy)

Aggregate 3–3

=== Play-off ===
9 December 1962

Petrolul Ploiești (Romania)	1–0	(East Germany) Leipzig XI
Dridea 48'	Report

Szent Imre herceg útjai, Budapest
Attendance: 3,000
Referee: Lajos Aranyosi (Hungary)

2 January 1963

Red Star Belgrade (Socialist Federal Republic of Yugoslavia)	1–0	(Spain) Barcelona
Kostić 72'	Report

Stade du Ray, Nice
Attendance: 6,000
Referee: Joseph Barbéran (France)

6 February 1963
21:45

Valencia (Spain)	1–0	(Scotland) Dunfermline Athletic
Mestre 58'	Report

Estádio do Restelo, Lisbon
Attendance: 2,500
Referee: Raul Martins (Portugal)

13 February 1963

Dinamo Zagreb (Socialist Federal Republic of Yugoslavia)	3–2	(Belgium) Union Saint-Gilloise
Kobešćak 28', 50'; Pašić 62'	Report	Mertens 15'; Braun 25' (o.g.)

Stadion auf der Gugl, Linz
Attendance: 1,500
Referee: Karl Kainer (Austria)

== Quarter-finals ==
Team 1	Agg.	Team 2	1st leg	2nd leg
Ferencváros (Hungary)	2–1	(Romania) Petrolul Ploiești	2–0	0–1
Bayern Munich (West Germany)	1–4	(Socialist Federal Republic of Yugoslavia) Dinamo Zagreb	1–4	0–0
Valencia (Spain)	6–2	(Scotland) Hibernian	5–0	1–2
Roma (Italy)	3–2	(Socialist Federal Republic of Yugoslavia) Red Star Belgrade	3–0	0–2

=== First leg ===
6 March 1963

Roma (Italy)	3–0	(Socialist Federal Republic of Yugoslavia) Red Star Belgrade
Manfredini 21'; Lojacono 24'; Menichelli 47'	Report

Stadio Olimpico, Rome
Attendance: 28,000
Referee: Gyula Gere (Hungary)

13 March 1963

Bayern Munich (Germany)	1–4	(Socialist Federal Republic of Yugoslavia) Dinamo Zagreb
Brecht 86'	Report	Zambata 19', 45'; Jerković 52'; Kobešćak 66'

Grünwalder Stadion, Munich
Attendance: 10,000
Referee: Joseph Heymann (Switzerland)

13 March 1963

Valencia (Spain)	5–0	(Scotland) Hibernian
Gil 15', 21'; Chicão 39'; Waldo 44', 65'	Report

Mestalla Stadium, Valencia
Attendance: 13,000
Referee: Giuseppe Adami (Italy)

27 March 1963

Ferencváros (Hungary)	2–0	(Romania) Petrolul Ploiești
Fenyvesi dr. 2'; Novák 19'	Report

Üllői úti, Budapest
Attendance: 30,000
Referee: Borče Nedelkovski (Yugoslavia)

=== Second leg ===
20 March 1963

Red Star Belgrade (Socialist Federal Republic of Yugoslavia)	2–0	(Italy) Roma
Malešev 12', 74'	Report

JNA Stadium, Belgrade
Attendance: 18,000
Referee: Kurt Tschenscher (West Germany)

Roma won 3–2 on aggregate.

3 April 1963

Petrolul Ploiești (Romania)	1–0	(Hungary) Ferencváros
Ivan 61'	Report

Stadionul Petrolul, Ploiești
Attendance: 20,000
Referee: Anastasios Faturos (Greece)

Ferencváros won 2–1 on aggregate.

3 April 1963

Dinamo Zagreb (Socialist Federal Republic of Yugoslavia)	0–0	(Germany) Bayern Munich
	Report

Stadion Maksimir, Zagreb
Attendance: 12,000
Referee: Mustafa Gerçeker (Turkey)

Dinamo Zagreb won 4–1 on aggregate.

3 April 1963

Hibernian (Scotland)	2–1	(Spain) Valencia
Preston 11'; Baker 25'	Report	Núñez 30'

Easter Road, Edinburgh
Attendance: 4,000
Referee: Ken Dagnall (England)

Valencia won 6–2 on aggregate.

== Semi-finals ==
Team 1	Agg.	Team 2	1st leg	2nd leg
Ferencváros (Hungary)	1–3	(Socialist Federal Republic of Yugoslavia) Dinamo Zagreb	0–1	1–2
Valencia (Spain)	3–1	(Italy) Roma	3–0	0–1

=== First leg ===
24 April 1963

Ferencváros (Hungary)	0–1	(Socialist Federal Republic of Yugoslavia) Dinamo Zagreb
	Report	Lamza 85'

Üllői úti, Budapest
Attendance: 25,000
Referee: Adolf Mach (Czechoslovakia)

25 April 1963

Valencia (Spain)	3–0	(Italy) Roma
Chicão 78'; Núñez 84'; Guillot 88'	Report

Mestalla Stadium, Valencia
Attendance: 40,000
Referee: Tiny Wharton (Scotland)

=== Second leg ===
16 May 1963

Roma (Italy)	1–0	(Spain) Valencia
Angelillo 26'	Report

Stadio Olimpico, Rome
Attendance: 60,000
Referee: Rudolf Kreitlein (West Germany)

Valencia won 3–1 on aggregate.

5 June 1963

Dinamo Zagreb (Socialist Federal Republic of Yugoslavia)	2–1	(Hungary) Ferencváros
Zambata 55'; Kobešćak 75'	Report	Fenyvesi 27'

Stadion Maksimir, Zagreb
Attendance: 40,000
Referee: Alois Kessler (Austria)

Dinamo Zagreb won 3–1 on aggregate.

== Final ==
=== First leg ===
12 June 1963

Dinamo Zagreb (Socialist Federal Republic of Yugoslavia)	1–2	(Spain) Valencia
Zambata 13'	Report	Waldo 64'; Urtiaga 67'

Stadion Maksimir, Zagreb
Attendance: 40,000
Referee: Giuseppe Adami (Italy)

=== Second leg ===
26 June 1963

Valencia (Spain)	2–0	(Socialist Federal Republic of Yugoslavia) Dinamo Zagreb
Mañó 68'; Nuñez 78'	Report

Estadio Luís Casanova, Valencia
Attendance: 55,000
Referee: Kevin Howley (England)

Valencia won 4–1 on aggregate.
