= 1954 Copa del Generalísimo final =

Copa del Generalísimo 1954 final
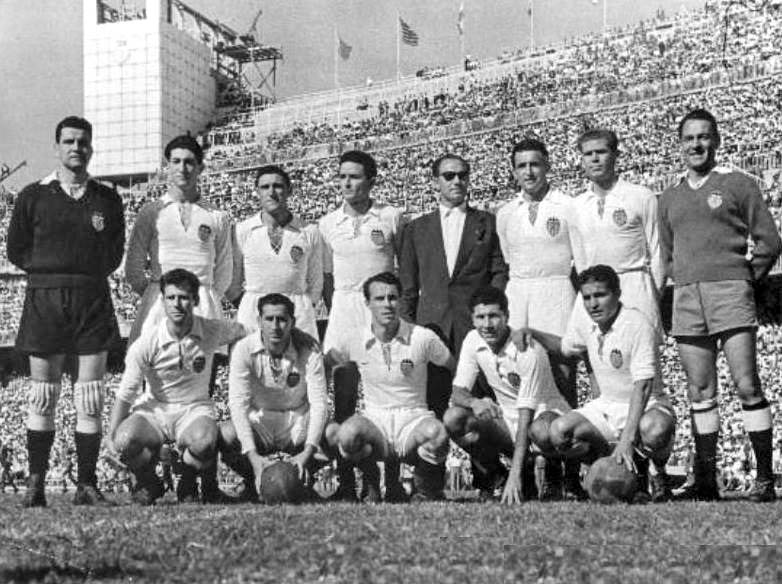
- Team of Valencia CF, champions
- Event: 1954 Copa del Generalísimo
Valencia	Barcelona
3	0
- Date: 20 June 1954
- Venue: Estadio Chamartín, Madrid
- Referee: José Luis González Echeverría
- Attendance: 110,000

The Copa del Generalísimo 1954 final was the 52nd final of the King's Cup. The final was played at Estadio Chamartín in Madrid, on 20 June 1954, being won by Valencia CF, who beat CF Barcelona 3–0.

== Details ==
20 June 1954
17:30 CET

Valencia	3–0	Barcelona
Fuertes 14', 59'; Badenes 57'	Report

Estadio Chamartín, Madrid
Attendance: 110,000
Referee: José Luis González Echeverría

Valencia

Barcelona

GK	1	(Spain) Quique Martín
DF	2	(Spain) Quincoces
DF	3	(Spain) Salvador Monzó (c)
DF	4	(Spain) Sócrates Belenguer
MF	5	(Spain) Pasieguito
MF	6	(Spain) Antonio Puchades
FW	7	(Spain) Daniel Mañó
FW	8	(Spain) Antonio Fuertes
FW	9	(Spain) Manuel Badenes
FW	10	(Spain) Enrique Buqué
FW	11	(Spain) Vicente Seguí García
Manager:
(Spain) Jacinto Quincoces

GK	1	(Spain) Juan Velasco
DF	2	(Spain) Josep Seguer
DF	3	(Spain) Gustau Biosca
DF	4	(Spain) Joan Segarra
MF	5	(Spain) Andreu Bosch
MF	6	(Spain) Isidre Flotats
FW	7	(Spain) Estanislau Basora
FW	8	(Spain) Luis Suárez
FW	9	(Spain) César (c)
FW	10	(Spain) Moreno
FW	11	(Spain) Eduardo Manchón
Manager:
(Czechoslovakia) Ferdinand Daučík
