= José Nebot =

Spanish footballer (1947–2013)

- Nebot with Valencia

Personal information
- Full name: José Nebot Navarro
- Date of birth: 5 September 1947
- Place of birth: Nules, Spain
- Date of death: 26 November 2013 (aged 66)
- Place of death: Palma, Spain
- Height: 1.74 m (5 ft 9 in)
- Position: Forward

Youth career
- Nules
- Valencia

Senior career*
Years	Team	Apps	(Gls)
1967–1968	Torrent		
1968–1969	Mestalla	37	(31)
1969–1971	Valencia	20	(7)
1971–1972	Mestalla	31	(5)
1972–1974	Betis	17	(5)
1975–1979	Mallorca	54+	(17+)
1979–1980	Poblense		
Total		159+	(65+)
- * Club domestic league appearances and goals

José Nebot Navarro (5 September 1947 – 26 November 2013) was a Spanish footballer who played as a forward.

He played 31 La Liga games for Valencia and Betis, scoring 9 goals and winning the league title with the former in 1971. In the Segunda División, he achieved totals of 102 games and 49 goals for Mestalla, Betis and Mallorca.

== Career ==
Born in Nules in the Province of Castellón, Nebot played youth football for his hometown club and for Valencia. After a loan to Torrent in the Tercera División in 1967–68, he played for Valencia's reserve team Mestalla in the Segunda División, finishing second top scorer of the 1968–69 season with 31 goals, behind Quino of Real Betis. He scored a hat trick in four games, including five goals in an 8–0 home win over last-placed Jerez Industrial on 18 May 1969.

Nebot was then put into the first team in La Liga for 1969–70, finishing as team top scorer with 7 goals in 19 games. On 12 April 1970, he scored the only goal of a home win over leaders Athletic Bilbao in the penultimate fixture, allowing Atlético Madrid to win the title; he scored again on the final day in a 2–1 win at Real Sociedad to take his team to fifth place and the last entry for the Inter-Cities Fairs Cup at the expense of Real Madrid. He scored three goals in the Copa del Generalísimo that season, and played in the 3–1 loss to Real Madrid in the final on 28 June.

Valencia won the league under manager Alfredo Di Stéfano in 1970–71. With new young players, Nebot was not used, until he was a surprise inclusion for the game at reigning champions Atlético Madrid on 6 March 1971; the 3–0 loss meant he never played for the club again.

In 1972, Nebot transferred to Betis, but left for Mallorca in the second division shortly after winning that competition in 1974. His first season in the Balearic Islands saw the club fall into the third tier for the first time in 16 years, and he left in 1979 for Poblense where he retired a year later.

== Personal life ==
Nebot remained in Palma de Mallorca for the rest of his life after signing for its club in 1974. He married María José, daughter of former player and manager Jaime Turró, in 1976.

Nebot died of a long illness in Palma on 26 November 2013, aged 66.
