= Nando Yosu =

Spanish footballer (1939–2016)

Personal information
- Full name: Fernando Trío Zabala
- Date of birth: 8 July 1939
- Place of birth: Mungia, Spain
- Date of death: 20 February 2016 (aged 76)
- Place of death: Santander, Spain
- Position: Midfielder

Youth career
- Nueva Montaña

Senior career*
Years	Team	Apps	(Gls)
1958–1962	Racing Santander	101	(23)
1959–1960	→ Rayo Cantabria (loan)		
1962–1964	Valencia	8	(1)
1963–1964	→ Racing Santander (loan)	28	(1)
1964–1966	Athletic Bilbao	30	(0)
1966–1969	Pontevedra	28	(0)
1969–1971	Calvo Sotelo	48	(6)
1971–1972	Gimnástica		
Total		243	(31)

Managerial career
- 1971–1972: Gimnástica
- 1973–1975: Gimnástica
- 1977–1979: Racing Santander
- 1979–1981: Oviedo
- 1982–1984: Linares
- 1984: Granada
- 1985–1986: Alavés
- 1988–1989: Alzira
- 1990: Orihuela Deportiva
- 1992: Ponferradina
- 1992–1994: Granada
- 1996: Racing Santander
- 1998–1999: Racing Santander
- 2005: Racing Santander
- 2006: Racing Santander
- * Club domestic league appearances and goals

Fernando Trío Zabala (8 July 1939 – 20 February 2016), known as Nando Yosu, was a Spanish football player and manager.

His extensive career, as both a player and coach, was mainly associated with Racing de Santander.

== Playing career ==
Born in Mungia, Basque Country, Yosu played professionally as a midfielder for nearly one decade, appearing in 122 matches in La Liga where he represented Racing de Santander, Valencia CF, Athletic Bilbao and Pontevedra CF, retiring in 1972 at only 31 after spells with CF Calvo Sotelo in the Segunda División and Gimnástica de Torrelavega of the Tercera División.

Early in his career, Yosu was also loaned by Racing to Deportivo Rayo Cantabria, at the time acting as a feeder team. Whilst with the Che he was used rarely in the league – also being loaned to Santander – but scored twice against FC Barcelona in the 1961–62 Inter-Cities Fairs Cup final, a 6–2 home win (7–3 on aggregate).

== Managerial career ==
Immediately after retiring, Yosu began coaching at his last team Gimnástica, even though he did not possess the obligatory licence. Afterwards he returned to main club Racing, starting with its youth teams.

From 1977 to 1979, Yosu served as head manager for Santander, but would work with the club in several other capacities, from match delegate to director of football. Additionally, in no fewer than five occasions, as an interim manager in the 90's/2000's, he successfully led the side away from relegation zone, always in the top level.

In March 2007, Yosu was honoured by the Government of Cantabria for his contribution to football in the area. He retired from the football world for good in January 2009, after leaving his post as Racing's director of football.

== Death ==
Yosu died in Santander on 20 February 2016 at the age of 76, from the effects of Alzheimer's disease.

== Honours ==
=== Player ===
- Inter-Cities Fairs Cup: 1961–62, 1962–63
