= Nebot =

Nebot is a surname of Catalan origin. Notable people with the surname include:

- Asensio Nebot (1779–?), Spanish monk and rebel
- Balthazar Nebot, eighteenth-century English painter
- Jaime Nebot (born 1946), Ecuadorian lawyer and politician
- José Nebot (1947–2013), Spanish footballer
