= Everton F.C. in European football =

English club in European football

- Club: Everton
- Seasons played: 17
- First entry: 1962–63 Inter-Cities Fairs Cup
- Latest entry: 2017–18 UEFA Europa League

Titles
- Cup Winners' Cup: 1 (1985)

This is the list of all Everton's European matches. The club's first entry into European competitions was the 1962–63 Inter-Cities Fairs Cup, with their most recent being the 2017–18 UEFA Europa League. Their only trophy in European competitions came in the 1985 European Cup Winners' Cup.

== European Final ==
- Everton's score listed first

| Year | Date | Competition | Opposing Team | Score* | Venue | Captain | Manager | Ref. |
|---|---|---|---|---|---|---|---|---|
| 1985 | May 15 | UEFA Cup Winners' Cup | (Austria) Rapid Wien | 3–1 | (Netherlands) De Kuip, Rotterdam | (Wales) Kevin Ratcliffe | (England) Howard Kendall | |

Notes:

• That season’s UEFA Cup Winners' Cup was the last trophy an english club has ever won. The following year in 1985, English clubs suffered a 5-year ban from European competitions in the aftermath of the Heysel Incident, with its Merseyside rivals Liverpool given an additional year of exclusion in 1990-91.

== Overall record ==
As of 7 December 2017

| Competition | Pld | W | D | L | GF | GA | GD | Win% |
UEFA competitions
| UEFA Champions League | 10 | 2 | 5 | 3 | 14 | 10 | +4 | 20.00 |
| UEFA Europa League | 52 | 27 | 8 | 17 | 87 | 64 | +23 | 51.92 |
| UEFA Cup Winners' Cup | 17 | 11 | 4 | 2 | 25 | 9 | +16 | 64.71 |
| Total | 79 | 40 | 17 | 22 | 126 | 83 | +43 | 50.63 |

Source: uefa.com
Pld = Matches played; W = Matches won; D = Matches drawn; L = Matches lost; GF = Goals for; GA = Goals against. Defunct competitions indicated in italics.

| Competition | Pld | W | D | L | GF | GA | GD | Win% |
Non-UEFA competitions
| Inter-Cities Fairs Cup | 12 | 7 | 2 | 3 | 22 | 15 | +7 | 58.33 |
| Total | 12 | 7 | 2 | 3 | 22 | 15 | +7 | 58.33 |

== Matches ==
List of Everton games in UEFA competitions
| Season | Competition | Round | Opponent | Home | Away | Aggregate | Notes | References |
|---|---|---|---|---|---|---|---|---|
| 1962–63 | Inter-Cities Fairs Cup | 1R | (Scotland) Dunfermline Athletic | 1–0 | 0–2 | 1–2 | —N/a | |
| 1963–64 | European Cup | PR | (Italy) Internazionale | 0–0 | 0–1 | 0–1 | —N/a | |
| 1964–65 | Inter-Cities Fairs Cup | 1R | (Norway) Vålerenga I.F. | 5–2 | 4–2 | 9–4 | —N/a | |
| 1964–65 | Inter-Cities Fairs Cup | 2R | (Scotland) Kilmarnock | 4–1 | 2–0 | 6–1 | —N/a | |
| 1964–65 | Inter-Cities Fairs Cup | 3R | (England) Manchester United | 1–2 | 1–1 | 2–3 | —N/a | |
| 1965–66 | Inter-Cities Fairs Cup | 1R | (West Germany) 1. FC Nürnberg | 1–0 | 1–1 | 2–1 | —N/a | |
| 1965–66 | Inter-Cities Fairs Cup | 2R | (Hungary) Újpest | 2–1 | 0–3 | 2–4 | —N/a | |
| 1966–67 | European Cup Winners' Cup | 1R | (Denmark) AaB | 2–1 | 0–0 | 2–1 | —N/a | |
| 1966–67 | European Cup Winners' Cup | 2R | (Spain) Zaragoza | 1–0 | 0–2 | 1–2 | —N/a | |
| 1970–71 | European Cup | 1R | (Iceland) Keflavík | 6–2 | 3–0 | 9–2 | —N/a | |
| 1970–71 | European Cup | 2R | (West Germany) Borussia Mönchengladbach | 1–1 | 1–1 | 2–2 | 4–3 pen. | |
| 1970–71 | European Cup | QF | (Greece) Panathinaikos | 1–1 | 0–0 | 1–1 | Away goals | |
| 1975–76 | UEFA Cup | 1R | (Italy) Milan | 0–0 | 0–1 | 0–1 | —N/a | |
| 1978–79 | UEFA Cup | 1R | (Republic of Ireland) Finn Harps | 5–0 | 5–0 | 10–0 | —N/a | |
| 1978–79 | UEFA Cup | 2R | (Czechoslovakia) Dukla Prague | 2–1 | 0–1 | 2–2 | Away goals | |
| 1979–80 | UEFA Cup | 1R | (Netherlands) Feyenoord | 0–1 | 0–1 | 0–2 | —N/a | |
| 1984–85 | European Cup Winners' Cup | 1R | (Republic of Ireland) UCD | 1–0 | 0–0 | 1–0 | —N/a | |
| 1984–85 | European Cup Winners' Cup | 2R | (Czechoslovakia) Inter Bratislava | 1–0 | 3–0 | 4–0 | —N/a | |
| 1984–85 | European Cup Winners' Cup | QF | (Netherlands) Fortuna Sittard | 3–0 | 2–0 | 5–0 | —N/a | |
| 1984–85 | European Cup Winners' Cup | SF | (West Germany) Bayern Munich | 3–1 | 0–0 | 3–1 | —N/a | |
| 1984–85 | European Cup Winners' Cup | Final | (Austria) Rapid Wien | 3–1 | | | —N/a | |
| 1995–96 | UEFA Cup Winners' Cup | 1R | (Iceland) KR Reykjavík | 3–1 | 3–2 | 6–3 | —N/a | |
| 1995–96 | UEFA Cup Winners' Cup | 2R | (Netherlands) Feyenoord | 0–0 | 0–1 | 0–1 | —N/a | |
| 2005–06 | UEFA Champions League | 3QR | (Spain) Villarreal | 1–2 | 1–2 | 2–4 | —N/a | |
| 2005–06 | UEFA Cup | 1R | (Romania) Dinamo București | 1–0 | 1–5 | 2–5 | —N/a | |
| 2007–08 | UEFA Cup | 1R | (Ukraine) Metalist Kharkiv | 1–1 | 3–2 | 4–3 | —N/a | |
| 2007–08 | UEFA Cup | Grp A | (Germany) 1. FC Nürnberg | —N/a | 2–0 | 1st | —N/a | |
| 2007–08 | UEFA Cup | Grp A | (Russia) Zenit Saint Petersburg | 1–0 | —N/a | 1st | —N/a | |
| 2007–08 | UEFA Cup | Grp A | (Netherlands) AZ | —N/a | 3–2 | 1st | —N/a | |
| 2007–08 | UEFA Cup | Grp A | (Greece) AEL | 3–1 | —N/a | 1st | —N/a | |
| 2007–08 | UEFA Cup | R32 | (Norway) Brann | 6–1 | 2–0 | 8–1 | —N/a | |
| 2007–08 | UEFA Cup | R16 | (Italy) Fiorentina | 2–0 | 0–2 | 2–2 | 2–4 pen. | |
| 2008–09 | UEFA Cup | 1R | (Belgium) Standard Liège | 2–2 | 1–2 | 3–4 | —N/a | |
| 2009–10 | UEFA Europa League | POR | (Czech Republic) Sigma Olomouc | 4–0 | 1–1 | 5–1 | —N/a | |
| 2009–10 | UEFA Europa League | Grp I | (Portugal) Benfica | 0–2 | 0–5 | 2nd | —N/a | |
| 2009–10 | UEFA Europa League | Grp I | (Belarus) BATE Borisov | 0–1 | 2–1 | 2nd | —N/a | |
| 2009–10 | UEFA Europa League | Grp I | (Greece) AEK Athens | 4–0 | 1–0 | 2nd | —N/a | |
| 2009–10 | UEFA Europa League | R32 | (Portugal) Sporting CP | 2–1 | 0–3 | 2–4 | —N/a | |
| 2014–15 | UEFA Europa League | Grp H | (Germany) VfL Wolfsburg | 4–1 | 2–0 | 1st | —N/a | |
| 2014–15 | UEFA Europa League | Grp H | (Russia) Krasnodar | 0–1 | 1–1 | 1st | —N/a | |
| 2014–15 | UEFA Europa League | Grp H | (France) Lille | 3–0 | 0–0 | 1st | —N/a | |
| 2014–15 | UEFA Europa League | R32 | (Switzerland) Young Boys | 3–1 | 4–1 | 7–2 | —N/a | |
| 2014–15 | UEFA Europa League | R16 | (Ukraine) Dynamo Kyiv | 2–1 | 2–5 | 4–6 | —N/a | |
| 2017–18 | UEFA Europa League | 3QR | (Slovakia) Ružomberok | 1–0 | 1–0 | 2–0 | —N/a | |
| 2017–18 | UEFA Europa League | PO | (Croatia) Hajduk Split | 2–0 | 1–1 | 3–1 | —N/a | |
| 2017–18 | UEFA Europa League | Grp E | (Italy) Atalanta | 1–5 | 0–3 | 3rd | —N/a | |
| 2017–18 | UEFA Europa League | Grp E | (Cyprus) Apollon Limassol | 2–2 | 3–0 | 3rd | —N/a | |
| 2017–18 | UEFA Europa League | Grp E | (France) Lyon | 1–2 | 0–3 | 3rd | —N/a | |

=== By country ===
==== UEFA competitions ====
Result summary by country
| Country | Pld | W | D | L | GF | GA | GD |
|---|---|---|---|---|---|---|---|
| Austria | 1 | 1 | 0 | 0 | 3 | 1 | +2 |
| Belarus | 2 | 1 | 0 | 1 | 2 | 2 | 0 |
| Belgium | 2 | 0 | 1 | 1 | 3 | 4 | −1 |
| Croatia | 2 | 1 | 1 | 0 | 3 | 1 | +2 |
| Cyprus | 2 | 1 | 1 | 0 | 5 | 2 | +3 |
| Czech Republic | 4 | 2 | 1 | 1 | 7 | 3 | +4 |
| Denmark | 2 | 1 | 1 | 0 | 2 | 1 | +1 |
| France | 4 | 1 | 1 | 2 | 4 | 5 | −1 |
| Germany | 7 | 4 | 3 | 0 | 13 | 4 | +9 |
| Greece | 5 | 3 | 2 | 0 | 9 | 2 | +7 |
| Iceland | 4 | 4 | 0 | 0 | 15 | 5 | +10 |
| (Republic of Ireland) Ireland | 4 | 3 | 1 | 0 | 11 | 0 | +11 |
| Italy | 8 | 1 | 2 | 5 | 3 | 12 | −9 |
| Netherlands | 7 | 3 | 1 | 3 | 8 | 5 | +3 |
| Norway | 2 | 2 | 0 | 0 | 8 | 1 | +7 |
| Portugal | 4 | 1 | 0 | 3 | 2 | 11 | −9 |
| Romania | 2 | 1 | 0 | 1 | 2 | 5 | −3 |
| Russia | 3 | 1 | 1 | 1 | 2 | 2 | 0 |
| Slovakia | 4 | 4 | 0 | 0 | 6 | 0 | +6 |
| Spain | 4 | 1 | 0 | 3 | 3 | 6 | −3 |
| Switzerland | 2 | 2 | 0 | 0 | 7 | 2 | +5 |
| Ukraine | 4 | 2 | 1 | 1 | 8 | 9 | −1 |

==== Non-UEFA competitions ====
Result summary by country (Non-UEFA competitions)
| Country | Pld | W | D | L | GF | GA | GD |
|---|---|---|---|---|---|---|---|
| England | 2 | 0 | 1 | 1 | 2 | 3 | −1 |
| Germany | 2 | 1 | 1 | 0 | 2 | 1 | +1 |
| Hungary | 2 | 1 | 0 | 1 | 2 | 4 | −2 |
| Norway | 2 | 2 | 0 | 0 | 9 | 4 | +5 |
| Scotland | 4 | 3 | 0 | 1 | 7 | 3 | +4 |
