= Francisco Lojacono =

Italian Argentine footballer and manager

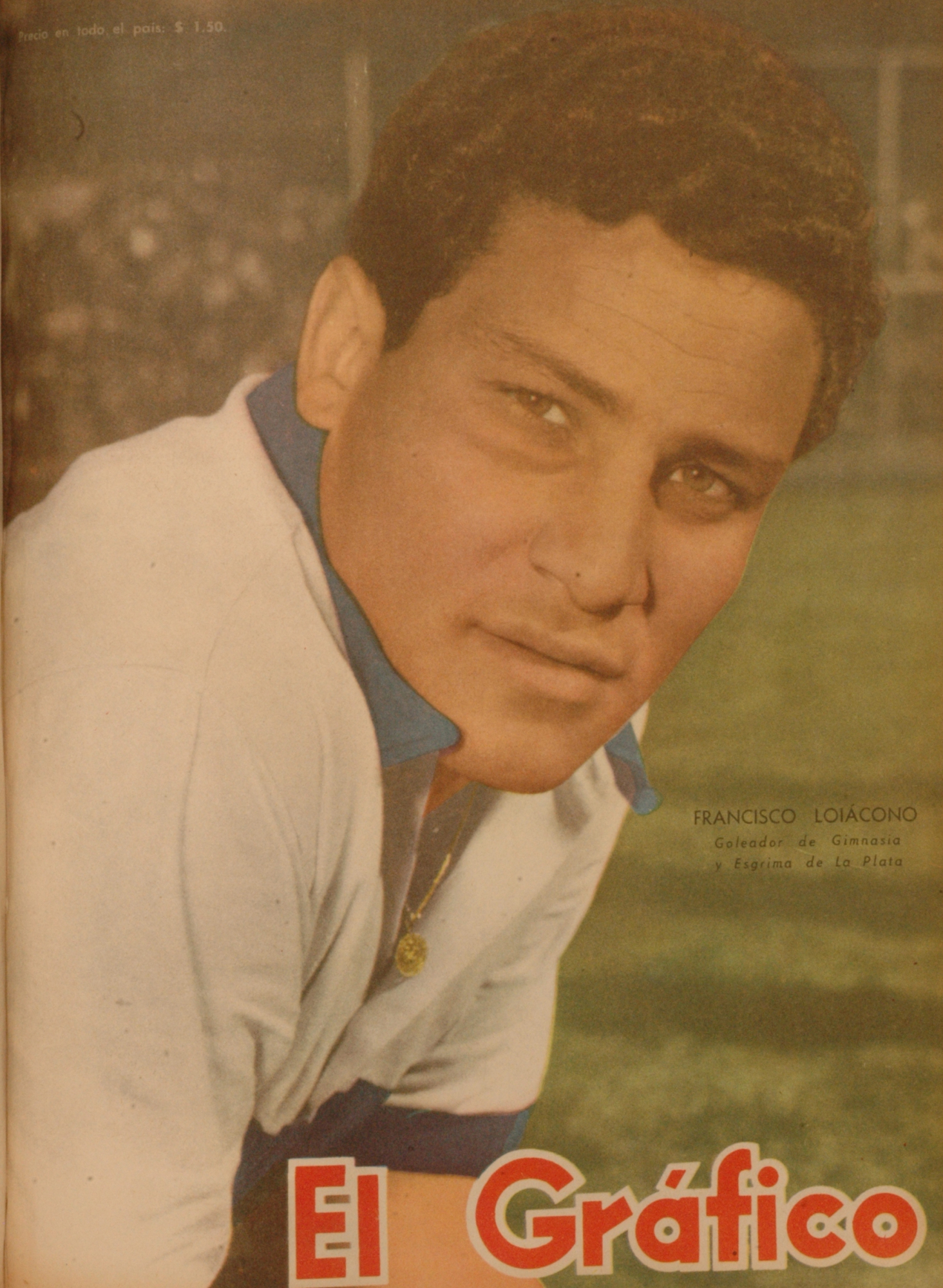

Personal information
- Full name: Francisco Ramon Lojacono
- Birth name: Francisco Ramón Loiácono
- Date of birth: 11 December 1935
- Place of birth: Buenos Aires, Argentina
- Date of death: 19 September 2002 (aged 66)
- Place of death: Palombara Sabina, Italy
- Height: 1.75 m (5 ft 9 in)
- Position: Midfielder

Youth career
- ???–1953: San Lorenzo

Senior career*
Years	Team	Apps	(Gls)
1953–1954	San Lorenzo	6	(0)
1955–1956	Gimnasia La Plata	51	(29)
1956–1957	Vicenza	18	(11)
1957–1960	Fiorentina	91	(32)
1960–1963	Roma	56	(22)
1963–1964	Fiorentina	18	(4)
1964–1965	Sampdoria	25	(1)
1965–1969	Alessandria	95	(33)
1969–1970	A.C. Legnano	12	(3)
1970–1972	Gimnasia La Plata		

International career
1956	Argentina	8	(0)
1959–1962	Italy	8	(5)

Managerial career
- 1972–1973: Latina
- 1973–1974: Castrovillari
- 1974–1975: Benevento
- 1975–1976: Livorno
- 1976–1977: Cavese
- 1977–1979: Barletta
- 1980–1982: Casoria
- 1982–1983: Salernitana
- 1983–1984: Nocerina
- 1984–1985: Akragas
- * Club domestic league appearances and goals

Francisco Ramon Lojacono (11 December 1935 – 19 September 2002) was a football player and manager, who played as a midfielder. Born in Argentina, he played for the Argentina and Italy national teams.

== Early life ==
Lojacano was born to an Italian Calabrian father and an Argentine mother (daughter of Italians).

== Club career ==
Lojacono began his playing career in Argentina with San Lorenzo, before moving to Italy to play with Vicenza, Fiorentina, Roma, Sampdoria, Alessandria and A.C. Legnano. Lojacono finished his career back in Argentina with Gimnasia La Plata. With six goals, he was the top-scorer of the 1962–63 Inter-Cities Fairs Cup (the precursor of the modern UEFA Europa League), along with Roma teammate and compatriot Pedro Manfredini, as well as Brazilian forward Waldo of Valencia; Roma reached the semi-finals of the competition, losing out to eventual champions Valencia.

== International career ==
During his playing career, Lojacono represented both Italy and Argentina at international level, and was part of the Argentine squad that finished third in the 1956 South American Championship. He obtained eight caps with Argentina, all of which came in 1956, and eight caps with Italy between 1959 and 1962, scoring 5 goals for the latter national team.

== Coaching career ==
After retiring as a player in 1972, Lojacono began a career in coaching that took him to managing a numerous Italian clubs, namely Latina, Castrovillari, Benevento, Livorno, Cavese, Barletta, Casoria, Salernitana, Nocerina and Akragas.
