= Enrique Buqué =

Spanish footballer and manager

Personal information
- Full name: Enrique Buqué Rojals
- Date of birth: 24 November 1927
- Place of birth: Barcelona, Spain
- Date of death: 5 May 1998 (aged 70)
- Place of death: Valencia, Spain
- Height: 1.82 m (6 ft 0 in)
- Position: Midfielder

Senior career*
Years	Team	Apps	(Gls)
1949–1951	San Andrés	32+	(13+)
1951–1958	Valencia	130	(42)
Total		162+	(55+)

International career
1953	Spain B	1	(0)

Managerial career
- 1961–1962: Alcoyano
- 1963–1964: Badalona
- 1964–1965: Abarán
- 1969: Mestalla
- 1969–1970: Valencia
- 1971–1972: Salamanca
- 1972–1973: Olímpico
- 1974: Sevilla
- 1987: Alzira
- * Club domestic league appearances and goals

Enrique Buqué Rojals (24 November 1927 – 5 May 1998) was a Spanish football player and manager.

A midfielder, whose technical ability compensated for a lack of pace, he began his career at San Andrés in the Segunda División. He played 159 total games for Valencia from 1951 to 1958, scoring 44 goals. He won the Copa del Generalísimo in 1954, having lost the final in 1952.

As a manager, Buqué led Valencia to the cup final in 1970 alongside Salvador Artigas, but was not retained in his role. He also helped Sevilla avoid relegation from the Segunda División in 1974.

== Playing career ==
Buqué was born in the El Clot neighbourhood in the centre of Barcelona. He began his career with local club CD San Andrés (now UE Sant Andreu) before joining Valencia CF in 1951. In his first season, he scored twice in a run to the 1952 Copa del Generalísimo final, which his team lost 4–2 to CF Barcelona after extra time.

Buqué's team won the national cup in 1954. He scored against Sevilla FC in a semi-final victory on 13 June, and played the 3–0 final win over Barcelona a week later.

In the 1954–55 La Liga, Buqué recorded a top-flight career-best of 10 goals in 25 games, including a hat-trick in a 4–1 home win over Barcelona on 17 October. The correspondent for Mundo Deportivo described the performance as "three stabs into the morale of Barcelona".

On 6 May 1953, Buqué earned a cap for Spain's B team at his club ground of Mestalla. He scored the second goal of a 2–0 friendly win over Luxembourg.

Buqué was known for lacking speed, and the expression "slower than Buqué" entered the Spanish language; he accepted it in good humour. Once, a taxi driver insulted another motorist by calling him slower than Buqué, only for his passenger to introduce himself as Buqué.

== Managerial career ==
Buqué managed CD Abarán in the 1964–65 Segunda División, in which the team were relegated. A year earlier, the club from the Region of Murcia had become the first team from a town of under 10,000 inhabitants to play in the Segunda División.

On 15 August 1969, Valencia sacked manager Joseíto and hired Buqué. In his first game as a top-flight manager four days later, he won 3–0 at RCD Mallorca; he was joint manager with Salvador Artigas.

Buqué and Artigas led Valencia to the 1970 Copa del Generalísimo final, losing 3–1 to Real Madrid on 28 June. After the game, he surprised journalists from Mundo Deportivo by saying that Real Madrid had benefitted from injuries to their own stars Amancio and Ramón Grosso, as this allowed Pirri to withdraw from an ineffectual centre forward position into the midfield. Valencia's board had already agreed to replace Buqué and Artigas with Alfredo Di Stéfano for the new season, shocking the pair who had believed that their results would keep them in their job.

Buqué was made director of football at Segunda División club Sevilla FC in July 1973, with Austrian Ernst Happel as manager. In May 1974, after the dismissals of Happel and Santos Bedoya, he was put in charge for the final three games of the season. His team avoided the relegation playoffs on the final day at the expense of nearby Córdoba CF, by winning 5–0 away to fellow Andalusians Linares CF on 26 May.

== Personal life ==
Buqué settled in the city of Valencia, where he had three daughters and a son. He died aged 70 on 5 May 1998, and Valencia CF observed a minute's silence before their game against Sporting de Gijón four days later.
