= Paraíba (footballer, born 1931) =

Brazilian footballer

Personal information
- Full name: Sebastião Thomaz de Aquino
- Date of birth: January 20, 1931
- Place of birth: Ingá, Brazil
- Date of death: 29 May 2017 (aged 86)
- Place of death: Recife, Brazil
- Position: Forward

Senior career*
Years	Team	Apps	(Gls)
1949–1954	Santa Cruz		
1955–1957	São Paulo	43	(19)
1957	Salgueiros		
1957	Santa Cruz		
- * Club domestic league appearances and goals as of 10 September 2023

Sebastião Thomaz de Aquino (20 January 1931 – 29 May 2017), mostly known as Paraíba, was a Brazilian professional footballer who played as a forward.

== Career ==
Born in Paraíba, Thomaz earned his nickname at Santa Cruz, where played until being transferred to São Paulo, 1955. He also played in Portuguese football and returned to Santa Cruz, where he won his only title with the club, in 1957. Scored 105 goals for Santa Cruz.

== Honours ==
=== São Paulo ===
- Small Club World Cup: 1955

=== Santa Cruz ===
- Campeonato Pernambucano: 1957

== Personal life ==
After retiring, he became a civil guard. On 25 July 1966, at Guararapes International Airport in Recife, Thomaz become one of the victims of a bomb attack, which aimed to assassinate the General Artur da Costa e Silva, who would become the next president of Brazil. Thomaz, who worked at the airport and identified one of the suitcases that contained a bomb, lost one of his legs with the detonation. In total, 2 other people died and 16 people were injured. It was later discovered that the left-wing group "Ação Popular" was responsible for the attack.

== Death ==
Thomaz died on May 29, 2017, in Recife.
