= Vicente Jara =

Footballer (born 1941)

Personal information
- Full name: Vicente Anastasio Jara Segovia
- Date of birth: 3 February 1941 (age 85)
- Place of birth: Asunción, Paraguay
- Height: 1.68 m (5 ft 6 in)
- Position: Forward

Senior career*
Years	Team	Apps	(Gls)
1960–1962	Guaraní		
1963–1965	Sol de América		
1965–1967	Córdoba	57	(17)
1967–1968	Valencia	16	(2)
1968–1970	Córdoba	45	(16)
1970–1971	Valencia	3	(0)
1971–1973	Sabadell	17	(4)
Total		138+	(39+)

International career
1966	Spain	1	(0)
- * Club domestic league appearances and goals

Vicente Anastasio Jara Segovia (born 3 February 1941) is a former professional footballer who played as a forward.

He spent most of his career in Spain, making 107 La Liga appearances and scoring 28 goals for Córdoba, Valencia and Sabadell, scoring in two Copa del Generalísimo finals for the second club (winning in 1967 and losing in 1970). Born in Paraguay, he played one game for Spain in 1966.

== Club career ==
Born in Asunción, Jara began playing with Club Guaraní and Club Sol de América before joining Córdoba CF of La Liga. In his first season in Spain, he played 28 games and scored 9 goals in 1965–66, followed by 29 games and 8 goals the following season.

Jara transferred to Valencia CF in May 1967. He scored three goals in six games to help the team win the Copa del Generalísimo straight away, including the first goal of a 2–1 win over Atlético Bilbao in the final on 2 July.

Jara returned to Córdoba in 1968, playing as they were relegated in his first season back. After staying in the Segunda División, he again signed for Valencia for the end-of-season cup competition and scored four goals in nine games, including a penalty equaliser in the final on 28 June 1970 that his team lost 3–1 to Real Madrid.

Jara played a bit-part in Valencia's league-winning season under Alfredo Di Stéfano in 1970–71, before transferring to CE Sabadell FC where he was relegated a year later, subsequently retiring. He settled in the city of Valencia and coached youth football.

== International career ==
Jara moved to Spain during a time in which foreign players were banned from the league unless they had Spanish heritage, which was sometimes proven with falsified documentation. He earned his only cap for the Spain national team on 7 December 1966 in a 2–0 win over the Republic of Ireland in Mestalla, in UEFA Euro 1968 qualifying.

As of 2020, the only other player capped for Spain while at Córdoba was José Mingorance, again just the once in 1963.
