= João Lanzoni =

Brazilian footballer (1930–2014)

Lanzoni
Personal information
- Full name: João Lanzoni Netto
- Date of birth: 28 August 1930
- Place of birth: Curitiba, Brazil
- Date of death: 13 September 2014 (aged 84)
- Place of death: Matinhos, Brazil
- Position: Forward

Youth career
- –1947: EC Água Verde

Senior career*
Years	Team	Apps	(Gls)
1947–1951	Coritiba		
1951–1953	Ponte Preta		
1953–1958	São Paulo	147	(50)
1954	→ Portuguesa Santista (loan)		
1955	→ Noroeste (loan)		
1957	→ Santa Cruz (loan)		
1958	Coritiba		
1959–1960	Juventus-SP		
1960	Corinthians		
1961	Independiente	21	(4)
1962	Palmeiras	9	(2)
1962–1963	Corinthians		
1963	Sport Recife		
1964	Britânia-PR		
1965	Millonarios		
1966	Noroeste		
1966	Sport Boys		

Managerial career
- 1968: Atlético Paranaense
- 1971–1973: Coritiba
- 1973: Atlético Paranaense
- 1974: Santa Cruz
- 1977: Coritiba
- 1977: Goiânia
- 1979: XV de Jaú
- 1980: Ferroviário-CE
- 1981: Vitória
- * Club domestic league appearances and goals

João Lanzoni (28 August 1930 – 13 September 2014), simply known as Lanzoni or Lanzoninho, was a Brazilian professional football player and manager who played as a forward.

== Career ==
Lanzoninho started his professional career at Coritiba, and in the 50s came to São Paulo football where he played most of his days as a player. He also played outside Brazil for Independiente, Millonarios and Sport Boys. As a coach, Lanzoni was state champion with Coritiba in 1972.

== Personal life and death ==
Due to his charitable work as an administrator of a Pentecostal church, Lanzoni was a peace ambassador by United Nations.

He died at age 84, victim of a stroke.

== Honours ==
=== Player ===
São Paulo

- Small Club World Cup: 1955

Santa Cruz

- Campeonato Pernambucano: 1957

=== Manager ===
Coritiba

- Campeonato Paranaense: 1972
