= Vicente Piquer =

Spanish footballer and manager

Personal information
- Full name: Vicente Piquer Mora
- Date of birth: 24 February 1935
- Place of birth: Algar de Palancia, Spain
- Date of death: 1 March 2018 (aged 83)
- Place of death: Algar de Palancia, Spain
- Height: 1.73 m (5 ft 8 in)
- Position: Right back

Youth career
- Segarra
- Valencia

Senior career*
Years	Team	Apps	(Gls)
1954–1957	Mestalla	48	(3)
1954–1955	→ Sagunto (loan)		
1956–1965	Valencia	197	(4)
1965–1967	Málaga	11	(0)
1967–1968	Sueca		
Total		256	(7)

International career
1957	Spain B	2	(0)
1961	Spain	1	(0)

Managerial career
- 1973–1974: Valencian Community (youth)
- 1976: Albacete
- 1976–1978: Vinaròs
- 1979–1980: Úbeda
- 1981: Levante
- 1982: Alzira
- 1983–1984: Vall de Uxó
- 1984–1985: Nules
- 1985–1986: Teruel
- 1986: Nules
- 1988–1989: Requena
- 1990: Barbastro
- * Club domestic league appearances and goals

Vicente Piquer Mora (24 February 1935 – 1 March 2018) was a Spanish football right back and manager.

He played 341 competitive matches with Valencia, in a 12-year professional career.

== Club career ==
Born in Algar de Palancia, Valencian Community, Piquer finished his development at local club Valencia CF. He started playing as a senior with the reserves in Segunda División and, on 24 February 1957, he made his La Liga debut for the first team in a 2–3 away loss against FC Barcelona. He scored his first goal in the latter competition in the next fixture, as the hosts beat Real Sociedad, 3–2; he added six appearances in the Copa del Generalísimo to help the side reach the semi-finals.

In the following years, Piquer was a regular for the Che, notably starting in all 18 games as they won consecutive editions of the Inter-Cities Fairs Cup. During his spell, he earned a reputation for his man-marking of Real Madrid's Francisco Gento.

Piquer retired in 1968 at the age of 33, following two years in the second level with CD Málaga and one with amateurs SD Sueca. He then worked as a manager, almost exclusively in the lower leagues and in his native region.

== International career ==
Piquer won one cap for Spain, during a 1–1 friendly draw to France played in Paris on 10 December 1961.

== Death ==
Piquer died in his hometown on 1 March 2018 at 83, following a long illness.

== Honours ==
Valencia

- Inter-Cities Fairs Cup: 1961–62, 1962–63
