= José Antonio Urtiaga =

Spanish footballer (1942–2024)

- Urtiaga with Atlético Madrid

Personal information
- Full name: José Antonio Urtiaga Albizu
- Date of birth: 17 October 1942
- Place of birth: Eibar, Francoist Spain
- Date of death: 25 June 2024 (aged 81)
- Place of death: San Sebastián, Spain

Senior career*
Years	Team	Apps	(Gls)
1960–1963	Mestalla	52	(27)
1962–1966	Valencia	23	(4)
1966–1968	Atlético Madrid	30	(10)
1968–1973	Real Sociedad	96	(22)
Total		201	(63)
- * Club domestic league appearances and goals

José Antonio Urtiaga Albizu (17 October 1942 – 25 June 2024) was a Spanish footballer who played as a forward.

Urtiaga made 149 La Liga appearances and scored 49 goals for Valencia, Atlético Madrid and Real Sociedad, winning the Inter-Cities Fairs Cup with the former in 1962 and 1963.

== Career ==
Born in Eibar in the Basque Country, Urtiaga began his senior career with two seasons at C.D. Mestalla, the reserve team of Valencia. In the Segunda División in 1961–62, he played 24 games and scored 13 times, including hat-tricks in a 4–1 home win over Cartagena on 10 September and an 8–1 rout of San Fernando on 22 January.

Urtiaga was included in the first-team squad for the 1962–63 season, where the presence of Brazilian Waldo limited him to 18 games and 6 goals in all competitions, with all goals and all but 5 games coming outside La Liga. After having won the 1962 edition against Barcelona, on 12 June 1963, he and Waldo scored the Che team's goals in a 2–1 comeback win away to Dinamo Zagreb in Yugoslavia in the first leg of the final of the Inter-Cities Fairs Cup, as his team won 4–1 on aggregate. He also played in the 1964 final, scoring the equaliser in a 2–1 loss to compatriots Real Zaragoza in the Camp Nou.

Having not sealed a regular starting place, Urtiaga transferred to Atlético Madrid in 1966. He took part in the European Cup in his first season, scoring in a 3–1 home win over Sweden's Malmö FF in the second leg of the first round. Two years later he joined Real Sociedad of his home region for the final five seasons of his career, all in the top flight; 1968–69 was his best season in the league with 27 games and 11 goals, including two in a 2–2 home draw with Atlético Madrid on 29 December, and another brace on 23 March in a 2–0 win over Atlético de Bilbao in the Basque derby also at the Atotxa Stadium.

== Honours ==
Valencia

- Inter-Cities Fairs Cup: 1961–62, 1962–63
