= Santos Bedoya =

Spanish footballer (1939–2025)

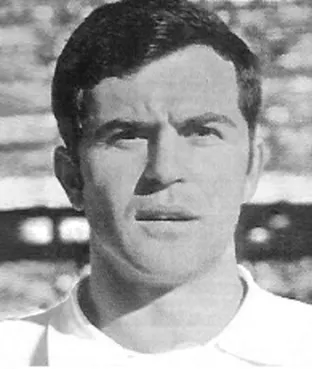
- Santos Bedoya with Real Madrid

Personal information
- Full name: Santos Bedoya López
- Date of birth: 3 November 1939
- Place of birth: Madrid, Spain
- Date of death: 9 February 2025 (aged 85)
- Place of death: Huelva, Spain
- Height: 1.74 m (5 ft 9 in)
- Position: Midfielder

Youth career
- 1957–1958: Plus Ultra

Senior career*
Years	Team	Apps	(Gls)
1958–1961	Plus Ultra	49	(2)
1961–1964	Español	66	(5)
1964–1965	Real Madrid	2	(0)
1965–1967	Deportivo La Coruña	56	(7)
1967–1972	Sevilla	152	(2)

Managerial career
- 1973–1974: Sevilla
- 1975–1976: Recreativo de Huelva
- 1982–1983: Cacereño
- * Club domestic league appearances and goals

Santos Bedoya López (3 November 1939 – 9 February 2025) was a Spanish footballer who played as a midfielder.

== Honours ==
=== Player ===
Real Madrid

- La Liga: 1964–65

Deportivo La Coruña

- Segunda División: 1965–66

Sevilla

- Segunda División: 1968–69
