= Gino Orlando =

Brazilian footballer (1929–2003)

Personal information
- Full name: Gino Orlando
- Date of birth: September 3, 1929
- Place of birth: São Paulo, Brazil
- Date of death: April 24, 2003 (aged 73)
- Place of death: São Paulo, Brazil
- Height: 1.73 m (5 ft 8 in)
- Position: Forward

Senior career*
Years	Team	Apps	(Gls)
1948–1951	Palmeiras		
1951–1952	Comercial		
1951	XV de Jaú		
1952–1963	São Paulo	453	(233)
1963–1964	Portuguesa		
1964–1966	Juventus		

International career
1956–1958	Brazil	9	(3)
- * Club domestic league appearances and goals

Gino Orlando, sometimes known as just Gino (September 3, 1929 – April 24, 2003), was an association footballer who played forward for the Brazil national team.

== Career ==
Born in São Paulo, Gino Orlando started his career defending Palmeiras between 1948 and 1951. After defending Comercial in 1951 and in 1952, and XV de Jaú in 1951, he joined São Paulo in 1952, scoring 232 goals in 450 games, placing him as the club's second all-time top goalscorer, just behind Serginho Chulapa. During his spell at São Paulo, he won the Campeonato Paulista in 1953 and in 1957, and was the top goalscorer of the Torneio Rio-São Paulo in 1958, with 12 goals. He later played in 1963 and in 1964 for Portuguesa, retiring in 1966 while defending Juventus.

=== National team ===
Gino Orlando played nine games for the Brazil national team between 1956 and 1958, scoring three goals. He played his first game on April 1, 1956, against a Pernambuco state combined team. His first goal for Brazil was scored on April 8, 1956, against Portugal. The other two goals were scored on April 11, and on April 15, respectively against Switzerland and Austria. Gino Orlando played his last game for the national team on May 18, 1958, against Bulgaria.

== Death ==
He died of cardiac arrest on April 24, 2003, at Hospital do Coração, in São Paulo.

== Honors ==
=== Individual ===
- Torneio Rio-São Paulo top goalscorer: 1958

=== Club ===
Palmeiras

- Campeonato Paulista: 1951
- Torneio Rio-São Paulo: 1951

São Paulo

- Campeonato Paulista: 1953, 1957
- Small Club World Cup: 1955
