= Morris Stevenson =

Scottish footballer

Personal information
- Full name: Morris John Stevenson
- Date of birth: 16 April 1943
- Place of birth: Tranent, Scotland
- Date of death: 22 July 2014 (aged 71)
- Place of death: Tranent, Scotland
- Height: 1.70 m (5 ft 7 in)
- Position: Inside forward

Senior career*
Years	Team	Apps	(Gls)
1960–1962	Motherwell	12	(3)
1962–1963	Hibernian	20	(4)
1963–1969	Morton	162	(26)
1969	Luton Town	1	(0)
1969–1972	Dundee United	32	(3)
1972–1973	Berwick Rangers	5	(0)
Total		232	(36)
- * Club domestic league appearances and goals

Morris John Stevenson (16 April 1943 – 22 July 2014) was a Scottish footballer who played as a forward.

== Career ==
Stevenson began his professional career in 1960 with Motherwell and played in twelve league matches over a two-year period. A 1962 move to Hibernian saw him feature twenty times but leave within a year for Morton. It was with Morton that Stevenson would spend half his career and make the majority of his career appearances, playing in over 160 league matches and scoring twenty-six goals. After six years at Cappielow, Stevenson moved south to Luton Town but played just once and quickly returned north, this time with Dundee United. After three years at Tannadice, Stevenson finished his career with a handful of appearances for Berwick Rangers.
