= Palle Bruun (footballer) =

Danish footballer (1938–1984)

Personal information
- Date of birth: 26 April 1938
- Place of birth: Odense, Denmark
- Date of death: 20 October 1984 (aged 46)
- Position: Forward

International career
Years	Team	Apps	(Gls)
1963	Denmark	2	(1)

Palle Bruun (26 April 1938 – 20 October 1984) was a Danish footballer. He played in two matches for the Denmark national football team in 1963.
