= Cor Luiten =

Dutch footballer

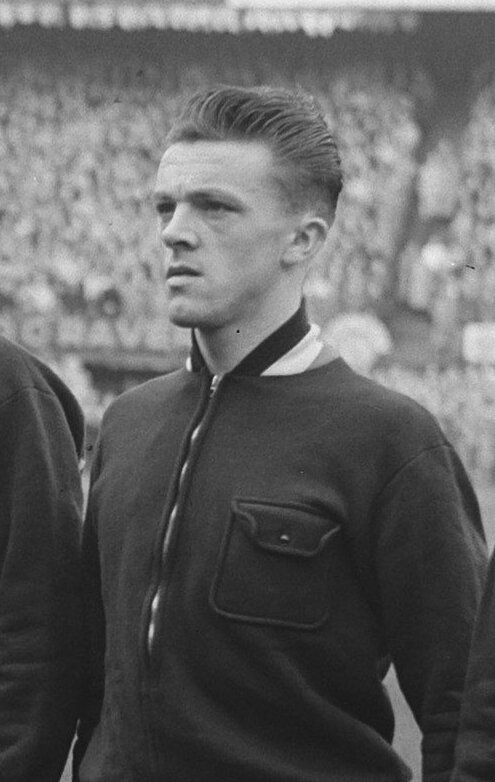
- Luiten (1953)

Personal information
- Date of birth: 3 April 1929
- Date of death: 9 November 1978 (aged 49)

International career
Years	Team	Apps	(Gls)
1953–1954	Netherlands	4	(0)

Cor Luiten (3 April 1929 – 9 November 1978) was a Dutch footballer. He played in four matches for the Netherlands national football team from 1953 to 1954.
