= Chicão (footballer, born 1940) =

Brazilian footballer

Personal information
- Full name: Francisco Amancio dos Santos
- Date of birth: 21 February 1940
- Place of birth: Rio de Janeiro, Brazil
- Date of death: 18 August 1968 (aged 28)
- Height: 1.83 m (6 ft 0 in)
- Position: Defender

Senior career*
Years	Team	Apps	(Gls)
1960–1961	Botafogo (SP)		
1961–1965	Valencia		
1965–1966	Levante		
- * Club domestic league appearances and goals

Francisco Amancio dos Santos (21 February 1940 – 18 August 1968), commonly known as Chicão, was a Brazilian professional footballer who played as a defender. He spent five years in the Spanish league.

== Career ==
Chicão signed for Valencia after impressing in a match against the Spanish club on 24 June 1961 as a part of the Orange Trophy, an annual friendly tournament. He stayed four years with The Bats, having a key role in their successful runs in Inter-Cities Fairs Cup in 1962 and 1963. In 1965 he moved to crosstown rivals Levante where he played for one season. Chicão died in 1968, at the age of 28.

== Honours ==
Valencia

- Inter-Cities Fairs Cup: 1962, 1963
