= 1968–69 Segunda División =

38th season of the second-tier football league in Spain

Segunda División
- Season: 1968–69
- Champions: Sevilla
- Promoted: Sevilla; Celta Vigo; Mallorca
- Relegated: Alcoyano; Alavés; Mestalla; Cádiz; Indauchu; Jerez Industrial
- Matches: 380
- Goals: 1,036 (2.73 per match)
- Top goalscorer: Quino (32 goals)
- Best goalkeeper: Rodri (0.71 goals/match)
- Biggest home win: Valladolid 10–1 Jerez Industrial (22 December 1968)
- Biggest away win: Indauchu 0–4 Real Gijón (18 January 1969); Burgos 2–6 Real Gijón (17 March 1969)
- Highest scoring: Valladolid 10–1 Jerez Industrial (22 December 1968)

The 1968–69 Segunda División season was the 38th since its establishment and was played between 8 September 1968 and 8 June 1969.

== Overview before the season ==
20 teams joined the league, including two relegated from the 1967–68 La Liga and 5 promoted from the 1967–68 Tercera División.

Relegated from La Liga

- Real Betis
- Sevilla

Promoted from Tercera División

- Indauchu
- Alavés
- Onteniente
- Ilicitano
- Jerez Industrial

== Teams ==
Location of teams in Segunda División 1968-69

Club	City	Stadium
Deportivo Alavés	Vitoria	Mendizorroza
CD Alcoyano	Alcoy	El Collao
Real Betis	Seville	Benito Villamarín
Burgos CF	Burgos	El Plantío
Cádiz CF	Cádiz	Ramón de Carranza
CF Calvo Sotelo	Puertollano	Calvo Sotelo
RC Celta Vigo	Vigo	Balaídos
Club Ferrol	Ferrol	Manuel Rivera
Real Gijón	Gijón	El Molinón
CD Ilicitano	Elche	Altabix
SD Indauchu	Bilbao	Garellano
Jerez Industrial CF	Jerez de la Frontera	Domecq
RCD Mallorca	Palma de Mallorca	Luis Sitjar
CD Mestalla	Valencia	Mestalla
Real Murcia	Murcia	La Condomina
Onteniente CF	Ontinyent	El Clariano
Real Oviedo	Oviedo	Carlos Tartiere
Rayo Vallecano	Madrid	Vallecas
Sevilla CF	Seville	Ramón Sánchez Pizjuán
Real Valladolid	Valladolid	José Zorrilla

== League table ==
Pos	Team	Pld	W	D	L	GF	GA	GD	Pts	Promotion, qualification or relegation
1	Sevilla (P)	38	22	9	7	56	30	+26	53	Promotion to La Liga
2	Celta Vigo (P)	38	24	4	10	63	28	+35	52	Promotion to La Liga
3	Mallorca (P)	38	22	6	10	62	37	+25	50	Promotion to La Liga
4	Ferrol	38	19	9	10	55	39	+16	47	
5	Real Gijón	38	16	10	12	60	46	+14	42 (Note: Real Gijón finished ahead of Calvo Sotelo on head-to-head points: Calvo Sotelo–Real Gijón 1–1, Real Gijón–Calvo Sotelo 1–0)	
6	Calvo Sotelo	38	15	12	11	47	41	+6	42	
7	Real Betis	38	14	13	11	69	51	+18	41	
8	Murcia	38	15	10	13	52	48	+4	40 (Note: Murcia finished ahead of Rayo Vallecano on head-to-head points: Murcia–Rayo Vallecano 1–0, Rayo Vallecano–Murcia 1–1)	
9	Rayo Vallecano	38	14	12	12	51	44	+7	40	
10	Valladolid	38	15	9	14	61	48	+13	39	
11	Oviedo	38	16	6	16	45	45	0	38 (Note: Oviedo finished ahead of Burgos on head-to-head goal difference: Oviedo–Burgos 4–0, Burgos–Oviedo 1–0)	
12	Burgos	38	14	10	14	47	53	−6	38	
13	Alcoyano (R)	38	12	11	15	51	55	−4	35 (Note: Alcoyano finished ahead of Alavés on overall goal difference)	Qualification for the relegation playoffs
14	Alavés (R)	38	15	5	18	47	62	−15	35	Qualification for the relegation playoffs
15	Onteniente (O)	38	15	4	19	47	54	−7	34	Qualification for the relegation playoffs
16	Ilicitano (O)	38	12	8	18	50	58	−8	32	Qualification for the relegation playoffs
17	Mestalla (R)	38	11	8	19	53	62	−9	30 (Note: Mestalla finished ahead of Cádiz on overall goal difference)	Relegation to Tercera División
18	Cádiz (R)	38	13	4	21	44	65	−21	30	Relegation to Tercera División
19	Indauchu (R)	38	9	6	23	40	79	−39	24	Relegation to Tercera División
20	Jerez Industrial (R)	38	6	6	26	36	91	−55	18	Relegation to Tercera División

Source: BDFútbol
Rules for classification: 1) points; 2) head-to-head points; 3) head-to-head goal difference; 4) goal difference; 5) number of goals scored
(O) Play-off winners; (P) Promoted; (R) Relegated

=== Top goalscorers ===
Goalscorers	Goals	Team
(Spain) Quino	32	Real Betis
(Spain) José Nebot	31	Mestalla
(Spain) Germán Muiños	19	Ferrol
(Spain) Enrique Galán	17	Oviedo
(Spain) Antonio Conesa	15	Mallorca

=== Top goalkeepers ===
Goalkeeper	Goals	Matches	Average	Team
(Spain) Rodri	27	38	0.71	Sevilla
(Spain) José Bermúdez	28	37	0.76	Celta Vigo
(Spain) Juan Zumalabe	29	34	0.85	Ferrol
(Spain) Jesús Castro	21	24	0.88	Real Gijón
(Spain) Alejandro Samper	36	35	1.03	Rayo Vallecano

== Results ==
Home \ Away	ALA	ALC	BET	BUR	CÁD	CAL	CEL	FER	GIJ	ILI	IND	JEI	MLL	MES	MUR	ONT	OVI	RAY	SEV	VLD
Alavés	—	2–0	1–1	1–1	5–1	1–0	0–1	2–0	1–1	2–1	4–1	4–1	3–2	1–3	2–0	3–1	1–0	2–3	0–2	0–1
Alcoyano	2–0	—	3–0	1–1	5–1	1–1	1–1	0–3	1–0	4–1	2–2	4–1	1–0	3–2	2–1	3–1	1–1	0–1	0–1	3–0
Betis	4–0	3–0	—	2–2	3–1	1–1	1–0	3–2	1–0	0–0	4–0	5–0	6–1	3–4	2–0	0–0	3–0	4–0	2–2	0–0
Burgos	1–1	2–2	2–0	—	1–0	1–0	0–3	3–0	2–6	1–2	1–1	1–0	2–0	2–1	2–0	2–0	1–0	1–1	2–1	1–2
Cádiz	2–0	0–1	2–1	2–1	—	1–1	1–0	1–1	0–2	3–1	4–1	2–1	3–2	1–0	2–2	1–0	0–1	4–0	1–4	2–0
Calvo Sotelo	0–0	3–3	4–0	2–1	3–2	—	0–1	0–0	1–1	2–0	3–0	4–1	2–1	3–1	1–0	1–0	2–1	1–1	0–2	2–0
Celta	2–0	4–1	2–1	0–2	5–0	2–2	—	0–2	3–0	2–0	5–0	1–0	2–0	1–1	4–0	2–0	1–0	3–0	1–0	2–0
Ferrol	5–0	1–0	4–2	1–0	3–1	2–0	2–0	—	2–1	2–1	2–1	3–0	1–0	4–0	1–2	0–0	1–0	0–0	0–0	1–0
Gijón	6–2	3–0	4–4	2–0	1–2	1–0	1–1	1–1	—	2–1	2–0	2–2	0–0	3–2	1–0	2–0	2–0	2–0	0–1	2–2
Ilicitano	0–2	3–2	5–3	1–1	1–0	1–2	0–1	1–1	0–0	—	2–1	6–1	0–2	1–1	0–3	2–1	4–0	2–2	3–3	5–0
Indauchu	0–1	3–0	2–1	1–4	2–0	0–0	1–3	2–0	0–4	1–0	—	2–2	1–3	2–0	3–1	0–1	1–2	2–1	1–4	3–2
Jerez Industrial	1–0	1–1	1–3	2–1	1–0	1–2	0–2	1–2	4–1	0–0	5–2	—	0–0	1–2	0–1	1–2	1–2	0–0	3–2	1–2
Mallorca	4–0	2–1	2–1	2–0	2–1	3–0	2–1	3–0	3–0	6–1	1–0	2–0	—	1–0	1–1	2–1	4–0	1–0	2–1	1–0
Mestalla	0–1	1–0	0–0	5–1	1–0	0–1	2–4	1–2	1–0	3–1	1–1	8–0	0–0	—	1–4	2–0	3–3	0–1	1–2	1–1
Murcia	1–2	1–1	2–2	5–2	3–2	0–0	1–0	0–0	2–0	0–1	2–1	3–1	2–1	1–1	—	4–3	3–1	1–0	0–1	2–1
Onteniente	3–1	1–0	3–1	0–0	3–1	4–1	0–1	4–2	0–1	0–1	1–0	1–0	2–3	3–1	2–1	—	3–2	3–1	1–0	1–1
Oviedo	1–0	1–1	0–0	4–0	3–0	1–0	2–0	2–1	2–1	0–1	1–0	2–1	0–1	2–1	0–0	5–0	—	0–0	3–0	3–1
Rayo Vallecano	5–2	2–0	0–0	0–1	1–0	1–1	0–1	4–2	1–0	1–0	6–0	4–0	1–1	4–0	1–1	2–0	4–0	—	0–0	2–2
Sevilla	1–0	1–1	0–1	0–0	0–0	2–0	3–1	1–1	3–3	1–0	3–1	2–0	2–0	3–0	2–1	2–1	1–0	1–0	—	1–0
Valladolid	4–0	3–0	1–1	2–1	3–0	3–1	2–0	2–0	1–2	2–1	1–1	10–1	1–1	1–2	1–1	2–1	1–0	6–1	0–1	—

Source: BDFútbol
Legend: Blue = home team win; Yellow = draw; Red = away team win.

== Relegation playoffs ==
=== First leg ===
28 June 1969	Bilbao Atlético	3–0	Alavés	Bilbao
	Zubiaga 8', 28'; Monreal 82'	Report		Stadium: San Mamés; Referee: Olavarria González

29 June 1969	San Andrés	2–2	Alcoyano	Barcelona
	Marín 28', 83'	Report	Saeta 4'; Alonso 43'	Stadium: Santa Coloma; Referee: López Montenegro

29 June 1969	Ilicitano	3–1	Hércules	Elche
	Arribas 33'; López Coll 70'; Aranda 86'	Report	Matas 77'	Stadium: Altabix; Referee: García Jaime

29 June 1969	Onteniente	1–0	Recreativo	Onteniente
	Figueirido 2'	Report		Stadium: El Clariano; Referee: Orrantia Capelastegui

=== Second leg ===
6 July 1969	Alavés	1–0 (1–3 agg.)	Bilbao Atlético	Vitoria-Gasteiz
	Baqué 89'	Report		Stadium: Mendizorrotza; Referee: Franco Martínez

6 July 1969	Alcoyano	1–2 (3–4 agg.)	San Andrés	Alcoy
	Alonso 58'	Report	Giralt 37', 77'	Stadium: El Collao; Referee: Ortiz Salgado

6 July 1969	Hércules	1–0 (2–3 agg.)	Ilicitano	Alicante
	Sevilla 37'	Report		Stadium: La Viña; Referee: Tomeo Palanques

6 July 1969	Recreativo	3–2 (3–3 agg.)	Onteniente	Huelva
	Vázquez 24'; Suero 80'; Fali 84'	Report	Figueirido 17'; Portalés 90+3'	Stadium: Colombino; Referee: Balaguer García

=== Tiebreaker ===
8 July 1969	Onteniente	2–1	Recreativo	Puertollano
	Marañón 31', 32'	Report	Vázquez 42' (pen.)	Stadium: Calvo Sotelo; Referee: Ortiz Salgado
