= Jerez Industrial CF =

Association football club in Spain

Jerez Industrial
- Full name: Jerez Industrial Club de Fútbol
- Nickname: Industriales
- Founded: 1951
- Ground: La Juventud; Jerez, Andalusia, Spain
- Capacity: 5,000
- President: Pedro Garrido
- Head coach: Juan José Durán Ayllon
- League: Primera Andaluza Cádiz
- 2025–26: Primera Andaluza Cádiz, 6th of 16
Home colours	Away colours

Jerez Industrial Club de Fútbol is a Spanish football team based in Jerez de la Frontera, Cádiz, in the autonomous community of Andalusia. Founded in 1951, it currently plays in Primera Andaluza Cádiz, holding home matches at Estadio La Juventud, with a capacity of 5,000 seats.

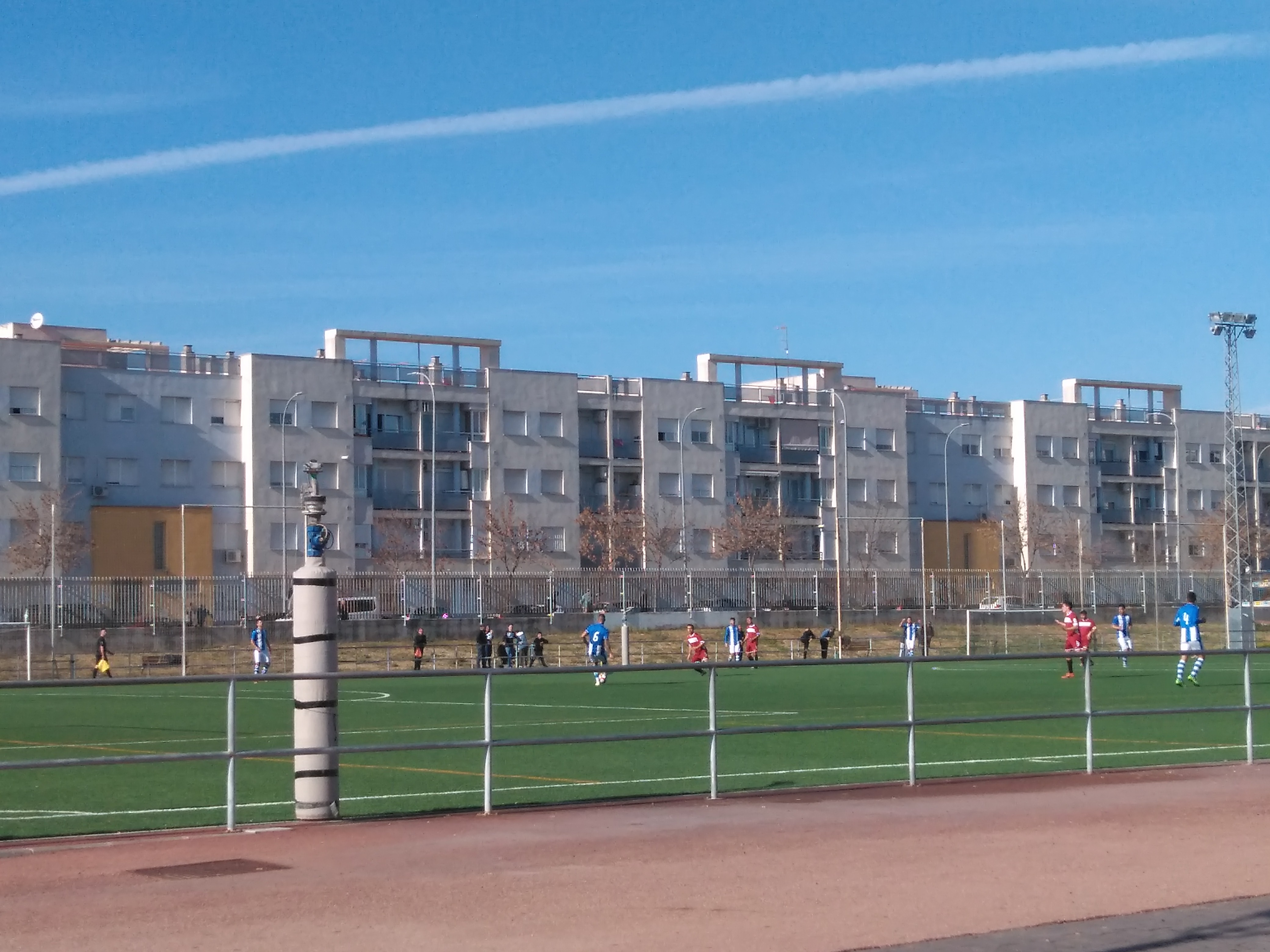
Match

In summer 2010, Jerez were at risk of bankruptcy, but were saved when they signed a five-year deal with the Glenn Hoddle Academy. Later, the academy left the project and continued with local management.

== History ==
Jerez Industrial was founded in 1951, reaching the national divisions six years later. The first league match played by the club was on 6 January 1952, against Andalusia neighbours Cádiz CF, a 1–2 defeat; Jerez finished the season in third place. In 1958, the first competitive derby match was played against Xerez CD, with a strong rivalry eventually arising between the two local clubs in the 1960s and 1970s, as they played in the same division for many years.

Jerez achieved promotion to Segunda División in 1968, but were immediately relegated back after ranking last in the league. Another relegation put the team in the regional leagues for the first time since 1957, with the new spell lasting five seasons.

In the 2008–09 season, Jerez promoted to Segunda División B – the new third level created in 1977 – but, the following year, the team found itself struggling in the league fighting relegation, with the club suffering from financial problems and the players owed wages. Subsequently, a loan of around £160,000 was paid by the Glenn Hoddle Academy (founded by former Tottenham Hotspur and England star Glenn Hoddle) so that the club could pay off debts and continue trading.

Eight players from the academy joined on loan in the second half of the season, but it was not enough to help Jerez avoid relegation back into the fourth level. Subsequently, a five-year deal was signed in the 2010 summer saving the club from bankruptcy, and Hoddle assumed control of all football operations. The side kept a Spanish coach and assistant, with Nigel Spackman, Graham Rix and Dave Beasant taking turns on the touchline and rotating on the bench for two matches at a time.

The Glenn Hoddle Academy terminated its agreement with Jerez Industrial in March 2011, and its players returned to United Kingdom, leaving the club with only their youth team to play their fixtures. The academy later agreed for twelve of its players to continue playing for the club until the end of the Tercera División season. Following the end of this deal the club continued to struggle financially, and were relegated two divisions to the Regional Preferente de Andalucía.

== Season to season ==
Season	Tier	Division	Place	Copa del Rey
1951–52	7	1ª Prov.	3rd	
1952–53	6	3ª Reg.		
1953–54	5	2ª Reg.		
1954–55	4	1ª Reg.	11th	
1955–56	4	1ª Reg.	9th	
1956–57	3	3ª	12th	
1957–58	3	3ª	1st	
1958–59	3	3ª	5th	
1959–60	3	3ª	8th	
1960–61	3	3ª	5th	
1961–62	3	3ª	3rd	
1962–63	3	3ª	9th	
1963–64	3	3ª	1st	
1964–65	3	3ª	3rd	
1965–66	3	3ª	1st	
1966–67	3	3ª	2nd	
1967–68	3	3ª	3rd	
1968–69	2	2ª	20th	
1969–70	3	3ª	10th	
1970–71	4	1ª Reg.	1st	

Season	Tier	Division	Place	Copa del Rey
1971–72	4	1ª Reg.	2nd	
1972–73	4	1ª Reg.	1st	
1973–74	4	1ª Reg.	2nd	
1974–75	4	1ª Reg.	1st	
1975–76	3	3ª	10th	
1976–77	3	3ª	12th	
1977–78	4	3ª	13th	
1978–79	4	3ª	14th	
1979–80	4	3ª	19th	
1980–81	4	3ª	12th	
1981–82	4	3ª	6th	
1982–83	4	3ª	9th	
1983–84	4	3ª	15th	
1984–85	4	3ª	16th	
1985–86	4	3ª	17th	
1986–87	5	Reg. Pref.	14th	
1987–88	5	Reg. Pref.	13th	
1988–89	5	Reg. Pref.	1st	
1989–90	5	Reg. Pref.	1st	
1990–91	4	3ª	16th	

Season	Tier	Division	Place	Copa del Rey
1991–92	4	3ª	12th	
1992–93	4	3ª	13th	
1993–94	4	3ª	13th	
1994–95	4	3ª	15th	
1995–96	4	3ª	18th	
1996–97	5	Reg. Pref.	4th	
1997–98	5	Reg. Pref.	8th	
1998–99	5	Reg. Pref.	10th	
1999–2000	5	Reg. Pref.	1st	
2000–01	4	3ª	5th	
2001–02	4	3ª	2nd	
2002–03	4	3ª	7th	
2003–04	4	3ª	6th	
2004–05	4	3ª	12th	
2005–06	4	3ª	14th	
2006–07	4	3ª	15th	
2007–08	4	3ª	14th	
2008–09	4	3ª	2nd	
2009–10	3	2ª B	18th	
2010–11	4	3ª	18th	

Season	Tier	Division	Place	Copa del Rey
2011–12	6	Reg. Pref.	2nd	
2012–13	5	1ª And.	8th	
2013–14	5	1ª And.	9th	
2014–15	5	1ª And.	2nd	
2015–16	5	1ª And.	11th	
2016–17	6	1ª And.	4th	
2017–18	6	1ª And.	4th	
2018–19	6	1ª And.	7th	
2019–20	6	1ª And.	2nd	
2020–21	6	1ª And.	2nd	
2021–22	6	Div. Hon.	18th	
2022–23	7	1ª And.	9th	
2023–24	7	1ª And.	3rd	
2024–25	7	1ª And.	3rd	
2025–26	7	1ª And.		

- 1 season in Segunda División
- 1 season in Segunda División B
- 41 seasons in Tercera División
