= 1967–68 Tercera División =

Tercera División
- Season: 1967–68

The 1967–68 Tercera División season was the 34th edition since its establishment.

== Group 1 ==
Pos	Team	Pld	W	D	L	GF	GA	GD	Pts	Qualification or relegation
1	Orense	30	30	0	0	100	8	+92	60	Promotion play-offs (champions)
2	Compostela	30	23	5	2	93	23	+70	51	Promotion play-offs
3	Fabril	30	18	5	7	62	25	+37	41	
4	Lugo	30	16	7	7	58	34	+24	39	
5	Gran Peña	30	14	5	11	60	55	+5	33	
6	At. Pontevedrés	30	13	6	11	50	36	+14	32	
7	At. Orense	30	12	8	10	32	32	0	32	
8	Alondras	30	12	6	12	39	47	−8	30	
9	Lemos	30	10	8	12	28	39	−11	28	
10	Arosa	30	9	8	13	34	40	−6	26	
11	Turista	30	8	9	13	36	43	−7	25	Relegation to the Regional
12	Arsenal Ferrol	30	10	1	19	28	60	−32	21	Relegation to the Regional
13	Rápido Bouzas	30	7	4	19	35	78	−43	18	Relegation to the Regional
14	Calvo Sotelo P.G.R.	30	8	2	20	32	76	−44	18	Relegation to the Regional
15	Órdenes	30	5	5	20	37	71	−34	15	Relegation to the Regional
16	Brigantium	30	4	3	23	24	81	−57	11	Relegation to the Regional

== Group 2 ==
Pos	Team	Pld	W	D	L	GF	GA	GD	Pts	Qualification or relegation
1	Avilés	30	25	1	4	92	17	+75	51	Promotion play-offs (champions)
2	Ensidesa	30	17	8	5	63	27	+36	42	Promotion play-offs
3	Candás	30	17	7	6	58	34	+24	41	
4	At. Gijón	30	16	8	6	50	29	+21	40	
5	Caudal	30	15	7	8	59	43	+16	37	
6	Vetusta	30	15	6	9	54	34	+20	36	
7	Entrego	30	12	9	9	48	40	+8	33	
8	Praviano	30	11	10	9	43	33	+10	32	
9	Turón	30	11	8	11	34	34	0	30	
10	San Martín	30	10	10	10	52	60	−8	30	
11	Marino	30	9	10	11	32	40	−8	28	Relegation to the Regional
12	Siero	30	9	7	14	28	53	−25	25	Relegation to the Regional
13	Titánico	30	8	7	15	30	46	−16	23	Relegation to the Regional
14	Carbayedo	30	5	6	19	32	60	−28	16	Relegation to the Regional
15	Calzada	30	3	4	23	18	76	−58	10	Relegation to the Regional
16	Santa Marina	30	1	4	25	25	92	−67	6	Relegation to the Regional

== Group 3 ==
Pos	Team	Pld	W	D	L	GF	GA	GD	Pts	Qualification or relegation
1	Indauchu	30	21	6	3	68	28	+40	48	Promotion play-offs (champions)
2	Baracaldo	30	20	4	6	66	25	+41	44	Promotion play-offs
3	Bilbao At.	30	19	5	6	70	30	+40	43	
4	Villosa	30	18	4	8	60	33	+27	40	
5	Sestao	30	14	6	10	56	42	+14	34	
6	Basconia	30	13	7	10	47	47	0	33	
7	Arenas G.	30	13	3	14	37	38	−1	29	
8	Guecho	30	10	7	13	40	38	+2	27	
9	Rayo Cantabria	30	12	3	15	45	48	−3	27	
10	Erandio	30	9	9	12	35	41	−6	27	
11	Santurce	30	10	6	14	43	48	−5	26	Relegation to the Regional
12	Amorebieta	30	10	3	17	47	62	−15	23	Relegation to the Regional
13	Deusto	30	9	4	17	34	62	−28	22	Relegation to the Regional
14	Portugalete	30	7	7	16	28	54	−26	21	Relegation to the Regional
15	Escobedo	30	8	5	17	36	73	−37	21	Relegation to the Regional
16	Galdácano	30	6	3	21	23	66	−43	15	Relegation to the Regional

== Group 4 ==
Pos	Team	Pld	W	D	L	GF	GA	GD	Pts	Qualification or relegation
1	Dep. Alavés	30	20	8	2	64	22	+42	48	Promotion play-offs (champions)
2	Éibar	30	21	4	5	71	26	+45	46	Promotion play-offs
3	Tudelano	30	15	8	7	71	44	+27	38	
4	Real Unión	30	13	8	9	43	33	+10	34	
5	San Sebastián	30	14	5	11	57	54	+3	33	
6	CD Oberena	30	13	7	10	51	40	+11	33	
7	UDC Chantrea	30	14	4	12	49	49	0	32	
8	CD Logroñés	30	12	7	11	59	35	+24	31	
9	Calahorra	30	13	4	13	47	49	−2	30	
10	Motrico	30	11	6	13	42	53	−11	28	
11	Haro	30	11	3	16	59	65	−6	25	Relegation to the Regional
12	Mirandés	30	9	5	16	41	72	−31	23	Relegation to the Regional
13	Elgóibar	30	9	3	18	39	68	−29	21	Relegation to the Regional
14	Mondragón	30	6	8	16	46	67	−21	20	Relegation to the Regional
15	Euskalduna	30	7	6	17	35	65	−30	20	Relegation to the Regional
16	Touring	30	5	8	17	43	75	−32	18	Relegation to the Regional

== Group 5 ==
Pos	Team	Pld	W	D	L	GF	GA	GD	Pts	Qualification or relegation
1	SD Huesca	30	21	7	2	79	19	+60	49	Promotion play-offs (champions)
2	Aragón	30	21	4	5	83	20	+63	46	Promotion play-offs
3	CD Teruel	30	15	9	6	66	33	+33	39	
4	UD Barbastro	30	16	7	7	54	31	+23	39	
5	Calvo Sotelo And.	30	17	4	9	75	38	+37	38	
6	CD Numancia	30	16	6	8	64	39	+25	38	
7	Monzón	30	13	7	10	55	39	+16	33	
8	Binéfar	30	13	6	11	49	42	+7	32	
9	Mequinenza	30	13	4	13	55	60	−5	30	Relegation to the Regional
10	Arenas Zarag.	30	10	9	11	36	44	−8	29	
11	Calvo Sotelo Esc.	30	10	5	15	44	75	−31	25	Relegation to the Regional
12	SD Ejea	30	10	2	18	60	68	−8	22	
13	Jacetano	30	9	3	18	43	80	−37	21	Relegation to the Regional
14	Utebo	30	6	4	20	31	68	−37	16	Relegation to the Regional
15	Épila	30	4	3	23	32	106	−74	11	Relegation to the Regional
16	Caspe	30	5	2	23	29	93	−64	9	Relegation to the Regional

== Group 6 ==
Pos	Team	Pld	W	D	L	GF	GA	GD	Pts	Qualification or relegation
1	Condal	38	26	5	7	71	34	+37	57	Promotion play-offs (champions)
2	Terrassa FC	38	20	8	10	64	45	+19	48	Promotion play-offs (champions)
3	Gim. Tarragona	38	19	10	9	83	45	+38	48	Promotion play-offs
4	Calella	38	19	7	12	72	46	+26	45	Promotion play-offs
5	San Andrés	38	15	13	10	51	49	+2	43	
6	Lloret	38	17	9	12	49	47	+2	43	
7	Olot	38	18	5	15	71	46	+25	41	
8	Girona	38	15	9	14	59	53	+6	39	
9	CD Tortosa	38	14	11	13	47	59	−12	39	
10	Figueras	38	14	10	14	67	63	+4	38	
11	Reus	38	17	3	18	54	54	0	37	
12	At. Cataluña	38	14	9	15	72	64	+8	37	
13	Gavà	38	13	11	14	73	88	−15	37	
14	Palafrugell	38	12	11	15	42	57	−15	35	
15	Granollers	38	14	7	17	59	69	−10	35	Relegation play-offs
16	Sans	38	14	5	19	46	60	−14	33	Relegation play-offs
17	Villanueva	38	15	2	21	67	69	−2	32	Relegation play-offs
18	Igualada	38	10	8	20	44	69	−25	28	Relegation play-offs
19	Guixols	38	10	3	25	51	89	−38	23	Relegation to the Regional
20	Manresa	38	4	14	20	42	78	−36	22	Relegation to the Regional

== Group 7 ==
Pos	Team	Pld	W	D	L	GF	GA	GD	Pts	Qualification or relegation
1	At. Baleares	22	18	3	1	70	9	+61	39	Promotion play-offs (champions)
2	Mahón	22	15	3	4	51	17	+34	33	Promotion play-offs
3	SD Ibiza	22	12	6	4	38	19	+19	30	
4	Menorca	22	12	5	5	38	19	+19	29	
5	Santa Catalina	22	8	4	10	37	31	+6	20	
6	UD Poblense	22	7	6	9	25	34	−9	20	
7	CE Manacor	22	8	4	10	19	42	−23	20	
8	CD Soledad	22	7	5	10	29	39	−10	19	
9	Binisalem	22	5	8	9	26	34	−8	18	Relegation to the Regional
10	Palma	22	5	5	12	14	40	−26	15	Relegation to the Regional
11	At. Ciudadela	22	3	5	14	17	56	−39	11	Relegation to the Regional
12	CE Alaior	22	4	2	16	11	35	−24	10	Relegation to the Regional

== Group 8 ==
Pos	Team	Pld	W	D	L	GF	GA	GD	Pts	Qualification or relegation
1	Onteniente	34	22	6	6	64	27	+37	50	Promotion play-offs (champions)
2	CF Gandía	34	19	5	10	62	40	+22	43	Promotion play-offs
3	Villarreal	34	18	3	13	54	35	+19	39	
4	CD Acero	34	16	6	12	50	40	+10	38	
5	Sueca	34	15	8	11	55	46	+9	38	
6	CD Onda	34	15	7	12	45	40	+5	37	
7	At. Levante	34	14	9	11	54	44	+10	37	
8	Paiporta	34	14	9	11	50	66	−16	37	
9	Benicarló	34	13	9	12	53	52	+1	35	
10	Torrente	34	12	10	12	45	44	+1	34	
11	Buñol	34	11	10	13	43	47	−4	32	Relegation to the Regional
12	Burriana	34	11	9	14	53	48	+5	31	Relegation to the Regional
13	Alcira	34	9	13	12	45	54	−9	31	Relegation to the Regional
14	Requena	34	12	6	16	53	61	−8	30	Relegation to the Regional
15	Carcagente	34	12	4	18	48	65	−17	28	Relegation to the Regional
16	Jávea	34	12	3	19	47	66	−19	27	Relegation to the Regional
17	Olímpico	34	10	6	18	40	51	−11	26	Relegation to the Regional
18	Saguntino	34	7	5	22	26	61	−35	19	Relegation to the Regional

== Group 9 ==
Pos	Team	Pld	W	D	L	GF	GA	GD	Pts	Qualification or relegation
1	Ilicitano	30	19	7	4	70	26	+44	45	Promotion play-offs (champions)
2	CD Eldense	30	18	3	9	58	23	+35	39	Promotion play-offs
3	Cartagena FC	30	17	3	10	59	34	+25	37	
4	Albacete	30	15	5	10	54	38	+16	35	
5	Novelda	30	13	8	9	45	39	+6	34	
6	Orihuela	30	12	8	10	37	35	+2	32	
7	Benidorm	30	12	7	11	47	43	+4	31	
8	Imperial Murcia	30	13	5	12	41	40	+1	31	
9	La Unión	30	12	6	12	44	47	−3	30	
10	Águilas CF	30	11	7	12	42	47	−5	29	
11	At. Cartagena	30	9	10	11	48	45	+3	28	Relegation to the Regional
12	Rayo Ibense	30	10	6	14	36	62	−26	26	Relegation to the Regional
13	Yeclano	30	11	4	15	54	68	−14	24	Relegation to the Regional
14	Almansa	30	10	4	16	41	58	−17	24	Relegation to the Regional
15	Alicante CF	30	10	4	16	39	45	−6	24	Relegation to the Regional
16	CD Cieza	30	3	3	24	23	88	−65	9	Relegation to the Regional

== Group 10 ==
Pos	Team	Pld	W	D	L	GF	GA	GD	Pts	Qualification or relegation
1	Linense	30	19	8	3	56	20	+36	46	Promotion play-offs (champions)
2	Almería	30	21	2	7	57	23	+34	44	Promotion play-offs
3	Algeciras	30	19	5	6	62	25	+37	43	
4	Melilla	30	16	5	9	51	28	+23	37	
5	CD Linares	30	15	6	9	56	26	+30	36	
6	CA Marbella	30	14	7	9	50	35	+15	35	
7	Estepona	30	15	4	11	42	48	−6	34	
8	At. Malagueño	30	12	9	9	36	28	+8	33	
9	Iliturgi	30	14	4	12	50	37	+13	32	
10	Adra	30	12	7	11	30	38	−8	31	
11	CD Fuengirola	30	11	7	12	44	43	+1	29	Relegation to the Regional
12	Recr. Granada	30	12	3	15	39	44	−5	27	Relegation to the Regional
13	Torremolinos	30	6	8	16	28	54	−26	20	Relegation to the Regional
14	Hispania	30	3	6	21	27	64	−37	12	Relegation to the Regional
15	Olímpica Victoriana	30	3	5	22	19	87	−68	11	Relegation to the Regional
16	Vandalia	30	3	4	23	22	69	−47	10	Relegation to the Regional

== Group 11 ==
Pos	Team	Pld	W	D	L	GF	GA	GD	Pts	Qualification or relegation
1	Portuense	30	23	6	1	72	22	+50	52	Promotion play-offs (champions)
2	Sevilla At.	30	22	6	2	74	17	+57	50	
3	Jerez Ind.	30	22	4	4	74	29	+45	48	Promotion play-offs
4	Triana	30	18	4	8	62	32	+30	40	
5	San Fernando	30	15	6	9	65	32	+33	36	
6	Alcalá	30	17	2	11	52	30	+22	36	
7	Balón	30	12	9	9	49	36	+13	33	
8	Sanluqueño	30	14	4	12	46	35	+11	32	
9	Ayamonte	30	11	7	12	42	40	+2	29	
10	Rota	30	12	4	14	33	37	−4	28	
11	Carmona	30	10	6	14	39	70	−31	26	Relegation to the Regional
12	Coria CF	30	6	5	19	25	58	−33	17	Relegation to the Regional
13	Utrera	30	5	5	20	34	71	−37	15	Relegation to the Regional
14	La Palma	30	5	3	22	27	76	−49	13	Relegation to the Regional
15	Riotinto	30	3	8	19	29	73	−44	12	Relegation to the Regional
16	At. Onubense	30	4	3	23	18	83	−65	11	Relegation to the Regional

== Group 12 ==
Pos	Team	Pld	W	D	L	GF	GA	GD	Pts	Qualification or relegation
1	Cult. Leonesa	30	24	3	3	85	14	+71	51	Promotion play-offs (champions)
2	Salamanca	30	21	4	5	75	23	+52	46	Promotion play-offs
3	SD Ponferradina	30	17	5	8	62	25	+37	39	
4	Europa Delicias	30	15	8	7	49	30	+19	38	
5	Béjar Ind.	30	14	8	8	50	40	+10	36	
6	Hulleras Sabero	30	14	3	13	40	42	−2	31	
7	Bembibre	30	12	5	13	31	41	−10	29	
8	Hullera	30	11	7	12	49	60	−11	29	
9	Júpiter Leonés	30	11	7	12	45	46	−1	29	
10	San Juan	30	10	7	13	50	64	−14	27	
11	La Bañeza	30	10	7	13	41	46	−5	27	Relegation to the Regional
12	Gim. Arandina	30	10	4	16	49	61	−12	24	Relegation to the Regional
13	Juventud	30	10	3	17	36	53	−17	23	Relegation to the Regional
14	Salmantino	30	8	5	17	35	62	−27	21	Relegation to the Regional
15	Gim. Medinense	30	8	4	18	29	69	−40	20	Relegation to the Regional
16	Castilla	30	3	4	23	18	68	−50	10	Relegation to the Regional

== Group 13 ==
Pos	Team	Pld	W	D	L	GF	GA	GD	Pts	Qualification or relegation
1	Plus Ultra	34	27	2	5	104	21	+83	56	Promotion play-offs (champions)
2	Talavera CF	34	22	3	9	71	38	+33	47	Promotion play-offs
3	Gim. Segoviana	34	21	2	11	81	44	+37	44	
4	At. Calvo Sotelo	34	21	1	12	79	45	+34	43	
5	Quintanar	34	16	9	9	49	37	+12	41	
6	CD Manchego	34	17	7	10	42	37	+5	41	
7	Askar	34	17	7	10	57	36	+21	41	
8	Pegaso	34	18	4	12	53	47	+6	40	
9	Tomelloso CF	34	17	5	12	55	44	+11	39	
10	Reyfra At.	34	17	4	13	78	46	+32	38	
11	Femsa	34	13	8	13	64	64	0	34	Relegation to the Regional
12	UD Socuéllamos	34	12	10	12	37	37	0	34	Relegation to the Regional
13	Ávila	34	11	8	15	51	53	−2	30	Relegation to the Regional
14	Santa Bárbara	34	8	6	20	33	82	−49	22	Relegation to the Regional
15	Guadalajara	34	8	6	20	35	69	−34	22	Relegation to the Regional
16	CD Toledo	34	8	3	23	45	87	−42	19	Relegation to the Regional
17	Villarrobledo	34	5	2	27	31	98	−67	12	Relegation to the Regional
18	Pedro Muñoz	34	3	3	28	13	93	−80	9	Relegation to the Regional

== Group 14 ==
Pos	Team	Pld	W	D	L	GF	GA	GD	Pts	Qualification or relegation
1	CP Cacereño	34	22	8	4	64	31	+33	52	Promotion play-offs (champions)
2	Valdepeñas	34	20	7	7	65	37	+28	47	Promotion play-offs
3	Moscardó	34	20	6	8	58	28	+30	46	
4	Mérida Ind.	34	20	6	8	71	33	+38	46	
5	RSD Alcalá	34	21	3	10	73	44	+29	45	
6	CF Extremadura	34	18	8	8	73	30	+43	44	
7	Boetticher	34	20	4	10	73	42	+31	44	
8	RCD Carabanchel	34	15	8	11	67	50	+17	38	
9	Plasencia	34	15	7	12	53	27	+26	37	
10	Aviaco Madrileño	34	13	11	10	61	54	+7	37	
11	Getafe	34	14	9	11	63	53	+10	37	Relegation to the Regional
12	Aranjuez	34	12	8	14	68	66	+2	32	Relegation to the Regional
13	Díter Zafra	34	10	10	14	49	54	−5	30	Relegation to the Regional
14	UB Conquense	34	12	4	18	50	72	−22	28	Relegation to the Regional
15	CD Don Benito	34	5	4	25	27	103	−76	14	Relegation to the Regional
16	Olivenza	34	4	6	24	29	86	−57	14	Relegation to the Regional
17	Leganés	34	3	7	24	29	84	−55	13	Relegation to the Regional
18	Imperio	34	2	4	28	25	104	−79	8	Relegation to the Regional

== Playoffs ==
=== Promotion to Segunda División (champions) ===
==== First round ====
Team 1	Agg.	Team 2	1st leg	2nd leg
Linense Terrassa	3-0	1-2	{{{6}}}	{{{7}}}
Alavés	-	Plus Ultra	2-1	2-2
Portuense	-	At. Baleares	1-0	2-1
Cacereño	-	Onteniente	4-1	1-4
Huesca	-	Cult. Leonesa	2-1	0-1
Orense	-	Condal	2-0	1-2
Ilicitano	-	Avilés	2-0	1-1

- Match of Tiebreaker:

Team 1	Score	Team 2
Cacereño	0 - 1	Onteniente
Huesca	0 - 2	Cult. Leonesa

- Indauchu received a bye.

==== Second round ====
Team 1	Agg.	Team 2	1st leg	2nd leg
Indauchu	-	Linense	1-0	1-1
Alavés	-	Portuense	0-0	2-0
Onteniente	-	Cult. Leonesa	2-0	1-1
Orense	-	Ilicitano	0-0	1-2

Promoted to Segunda División
Indauchu	Alavés	Onteniente	Ilicitano

=== Promotion/relegation Segunda División ===
==== First round ====
Team 1	Agg.	Team 2	1st leg	2nd leg
Almería	-	Aragón	2-1	0-0
Compostela	-	Eldense	2-0	1-0
Mahón	-	Gandía	1-0	0-1
Gim. Tarragona	-	Valdepeñas	3-2	1-2
Talavera	-	Jerez Ind.	1-1	2-4
Ensidesa	-	Éibar	0-0	1-2
Baracaldo	-	Salamanca	0-0	0-3

- Match of Tiebreaker:

Team 1	Score	Team 2
Mahón	1 - 1 (??pen)	Gandía
Gim. Tarragona	4 - 2	Valdepeñas

- Calella received a bye.

==== Second round ====
Team 1	Agg.	Team 2	1st leg	2nd leg
Almería	-	Compostela	0-3	1-1
Mahón	-	Gim. Tarragona	4-1	4-2
Jerez Ind.	-	Éibar	1-1	1-0
Calella	-	Salamanca	2-1	1-2

- Match of Tiebreaker:

Team 1	Score	Team 2
Calella	0 - 3	Salamanca

==== Final Round ====
Team 1	Agg.	Team 2	1st leg	2nd leg
Salamanca	-	Ferrol	1-2	1-2
Mahón	-	Burgos	2-1	1-4
Compostela	-	Mestalla	0-0	1-5
Jerez Ind.	-	At. Ceuta	0-0	1-1

- Match of Tiebreaker:

Team 1	Score	Team 2
Jerez Ind.	1 - 0	At. Ceuta

Promoted to Segunda División
Jerez Ind.

Permanence in Segunda División
Ferrol	Burgos	Mestalla
