= Antonio Fuertes =

Spanish footballer (1929–2015)

Personal information
- Full name: Antonio Fuertes Pascual
- Date of birth: 3 December 1929
- Place of birth: Valencia, Spain
- Date of death: 5 January 2015 (aged 85)
- Place of death: Valencia, Spain
- Position: Midfielder

Senior career*
Years	Team	Apps	(Gls)
1943–1949	CD Mestalla		
1949–1951	Valencia	40	(10)
1951–1952	CD Mestalla		
1952–1959	Valencia	146	(48)
1959–1961	Elche	51	(11)

International career
1952	Spain	1	(0)
- * Club domestic league appearances and goals

Antonio Fuertes Pascual (3 December 1929 – 5 January 2015) was a Spanish footballer who played as a midfielder. He played for Valencia and Elche and won one cap for the Spain national team.
