= Daniel Mañó =

Spanish footballer (1932–2024)

Daniel Mañó Villagrasa (27 February 1932 – 5 August 2024) was a Spanish footballer who played as a forward.

He spent most of his career at Valencia, totalling 285 games and 49 goals. He won the Copa del Generalísimo in 1954 and the Inter-Cities Fairs Cup in 1963. He played one game for Spain in 1955.

== Club career ==
Mañó was born in Sueca in the Province of Valencia. He was one of several local players from SD Sueca to move to Valencia CF in the mid-20th century.

In 1951–52, Mañó was part of the Valencia reserve team, Mestalla, who won the Segunda División playoffs. The club were barred from promotion to La Liga by order of the Royal Spanish Football Federation as their parent club played in the division.

After this achievement, Mañó was promoted to the first team, who had been needing wingers since Epi Fernández had left the club. His top-flight debut on 14 September 1952 was a goalless draw away to Real Sociedad on the opening day of the season, with his team containing nine local players; Francisco Sendra and Antonio Puchades were also from Sueca and the former also a debutant. Mañó was part of the Valencia team who won the Copa del Generalísimo in 1954. He was the last survivor of that squad.

Aged 30, Mañó dropped back into the reserve team in 1962–63, to help the club avoid relegation to the Tercera División. He took part with the first team in the Inter-Cities Fairs Cup, and on 26 June 1963 he opened the score in a 2–0 home win over Dinamo Zagreb in the second leg of the final (4–1 aggregate).

== International career ==
Mañó played one game for Spain on 18 May 1955, a 1–1 friendly draw with England at the Santiago Bernabéu Stadium. According to Carlos Pardo of Mundo Deportivo, Spain's formation caused Mañó and fellow winger Paco Gento to need to defend, which led them to be too far back to affect their team's attack.

Mañó also earned three caps for the Spain B team, debuting on 13 March 1955 in a 7–1 win over Greece and ending two years to the day in a 2–0 loss to the same team. All three games were part of the 1953–58 Mediterranean Cup.

== Later life and death ==
Mañó's last public appearance was in 2019 for Valencia's centenary. As the oldest veteran of the club, he was the first to walk out on the Mestalla Stadium pitch for the event.

Mañó died on 5 August 2024, aged 92.
