= Quincoces =

Spanish footballer (1933–2002)

Personal information
- Full name: Juan Carlos Díaz Quincoces
- Date of birth: 26 January 1933
- Place of birth: Vitoria-Gasteiz, Spain
- Date of death: 28 November 2002 (aged 69)
- Height: 1.82 m (6 ft 0 in)
- Position: Defender

Senior career*
Years	Team	Apps	(Gls)
1952–1954	CD Mestalla	59	(0)
1953–1964	Valencia	223	(1)
1964–1966	Real Murcia	56	(0)
1966–1967	Alavés		
Total		338	(1)

International career
1957–1959	Spain	8	(0)
- * Club domestic league appearances and goals

Juan Carlos Díaz Quincoces (26 January 1933 – 28 November 2002), known as just Quincoces, was a Spanish footballer who played as a defender. He made eight appearances for the Spain national team from 1957 to 1959.

His uncle, Jacinto Quincoces, was also a professional footballer, a Spanish international, and a prominent coach. Juan Carlos was often referred to by his maternal surname - 'Quincoces II' - to distinguish him from his famous uncle, although the conventional practice would have been to use his paternal surname, Díaz. They worked together at Valencia as coach and player in two spells.
