= Julio César Benítez =

Uruguayan footballer (1940-1968)

Personal information
- Full name: Julio César Benítez Amodeo
- Date of birth: October 1, 1940
- Place of birth: Montevideo, Uruguay
- Date of death: April 6, 1968 (aged 27)
- Place of death: Barcelona, Spain
- Position: Fullback

Senior career*
Years	Team	Apps	(Gls)
1955–1959	Racing Club de Montevideo		
1959–1960	Real Valladolid	26	(5)
1960–1961	Real Zaragoza	30	(2)
1961–1968	FC Barcelona	123	(10)
Total		179	(17)
- * Club domestic league appearances and goals

Julio César Benítez Amodeo (October 1, 1940 – April 6, 1968) was an Uruguayan footballer, known for his time in FC Barcelona from 1961 until his surprising death in 1968.

Benítez was a defender, appreciated for his physical strength, technique with the ball and powerful shot. His rivalry with Francisco Gento, Real Madrid player, helped him earn Barcelona's fans appreciation.

Benítez started his football career at the age of 16, in Racing Club de Montevideo, then playing in the Uruguayan first division. In 1959 he played for Real Valladolid, and a year later he moved to Real Zaragoza. In his time with these teams he established himself as a great player. Benítez moved to FC Barcelona in August 1961. In Barcelona he played in several positions in midfield and even in attack, but he became fixated as a fullback after a short while. With Barcelona he won Copa del Generalísimo in 1963 and Inter Cities Fairs Cup in 1966.

He died on April 6, 1968, in Barcelona, three days before a critical game in the Camp Nou against Real Madrid. The cause of his death was eating spoiled seafood, which resulted in gastroenteritis and ultimately his death. His death attracted huge attention to Spanish football in general and Barcelona in particular. 150,000 fans of FC Barcelona were present at his funeral in the Camp Nou, two days before the game. Benítez was buried in a cemetery near Camp Nou on April 8. The Royal Spanish Football Federation decided not to cancel the game, but just put if off by two days. Benítez's last words were "Come on friends, let's win Madrid 2-0!". However, his teammate could not cope psychologically with his death and devote him a win in the game, and the game ended in a 1–1 draw. Nevertheless, on July 11, 1968, Barcelona beat Real Madrid in the cup final, and the win was dedicated in memory of Benítez. The cup title was included in the list of titles won by Benítez, as a dedication to his contribution to the team.
