= 1972–73 Atlético Madrid season =

Atlético Madrid
1972–73 season
- President: Vicente Calderon
- Head Coach: Max Merkel
- Stadium: Vicente Calderon
- Primera Division: Winners (In 1973–74 European Cup)
- Copa del Generalísimo: 5th round
- European Cup Winners' Cup: Eightfinals
- Top goalscorer: League: Aragonés (16); All: Aragonés (18)
- Highest home attendance: 70,000 vs Deportivo La Coruña (20 May 1973)
- Lowest home attendance: 15,000 vs Real Oviedo (15 January 1973)
Home colours

The 1972–73 season was Atlético Madrid's 69th season in existence and the club's 36th consecutive season in the top flight of Spanish football.

== Summary ==
After winning the Cup in 1971, the squad with Austrian head coach Max Merkel clinched the league trophy being its 7th title in the 1972/73. Paraguayan winger Domingo Benegas returned from Burgos CF along the transfer in of Left-back Jose Luis Capon. As incumbent champions in 1972-73 Copa del Generalisimo the team was early eliminated by Deportivo La Coruña in the 5th round. Also in the UEFA Cup Winners' Cup the club reached the eightfinals only to be defeated by the soviet team Spartak Moscow in a two-legged series. Shockingly, Merkel was sacked by the club president Vicente Calderon due to an interview with a German newspaper in which, allegedly, he criticized the Spanish football league.

== Squad ==
Note: Flags indicate national team as defined under FIFA eligibility rules; some limited exceptions apply. Players may hold more than one non-FIFA nationality.

| No. | Pos. | Nation | Player |
|---|---|---|---|
| - | GK | ESP | Rodri |
| - | GK | ESP | José Pacheco |
| - | DF | ARG | Iselín Santos Ovejero |
| - | DF | ESP | Quique |
| - | DF | ESP | José Luis Capón |
| - | DF | ESP | Francisco Melo |
| - | DF | ESP | Julio Iglesias |
| - | DF | ESP | Jesús Martínez Jayo |
| - | DF | ESP | Eusebio Bejarano |
| - | MF | PAR | Domingo Benegas |

| No. | Pos. | Nation | Player |
|---|---|---|---|
| - | MF | ESP | Adelardo |
| - | MF | ESP | Alberto Fernández |
| - | MF | ESP | Javier Irureta |
| - | MF | ESP | Ignacio Salcedo |
| - | MF | ESP | Eugenio Leal |
| - | MF | ESP | Julio Orozco |
| - | FW | ESP | Luis Aragonés |
| - | FW | ARG | José Eulogio Gárate |
| - | FW | BRA | Heraldo Bezerra |
| - | FW | ESP | José Ufarte |
| - | FW | POR | Pataco |

=== Transfers ===
In
| Pos. | Name | from | Type |
|---|---|---|---|
| DF | José Luis Capón | Burgos CF | |
| FW | Domingo Benegas | Burgos CF | loan ended |

Out
| Pos. | Name | To | Type |
|---|---|---|---|
| DF | Isacio Calleja | | retired |
| GK | Zubiarrain | | |

== Competitions ==
=== Primera Division ===
==== League table ====
| Pos | Team | Pld | W | D | L | GF | GA | GD | Pts | Qualification or relegation |
|---|---|---|---|---|---|---|---|---|---|---|
| 1 | Atlético Madrid (C) | 34 | 20 | 8 | 6 | 49 | 29 | +20 | 48 | Qualification for the European Cup first round |
| 2 | Barcelona | 34 | 18 | 10 | 6 | 41 | 21 | +20 | 46 | Qualification for the UEFA Cup first round |
| 3 | Español | 34 | 17 | 11 | 6 | 48 | 27 | +21 | 45 | Qualification for the UEFA Cup first round |
| 4 | Real Madrid | 34 | 17 | 9 | 8 | 45 | 29 | +16 | 43 | Qualification for the UEFA Cup first round |
| 5 | Castellón | 34 | 13 | 9 | 12 | 44 | 38 | +6 | 35 | |

Source: BDFútbol
Rules for classification: 1) Points; 2) Head-to-head results; 3) Goal difference; 4) Number of goals scored
(C) Champions

==== Results by round ====
| Round | 1 | 2 | 3 | 4 | 5 | 6 | 7 | 8 | 9 | 10 | 11 | 12 | 13 | 14 | 15 | 16 | 17 | 18 | 19 | 20 | 21 | 22 | 23 | 24 | 25 | 26 | 27 | 28 | 29 | 30 | 31 | 32 | 33 | 34 |
|---|---|---|---|---|---|---|---|---|---|---|---|---|---|---|---|---|---|---|---|---|---|---|---|---|---|---|---|---|---|---|---|---|---|---|
| Ground | H | A | H | A | H | A | H | A | H | A | H | A | A | H | A | H | A | A | H | A | H | A | H | A | H | A | H | A | H | H | A | H | A | H |
| Result | L | W | W | W | D | L | W | W | W | D | L | D | W | W | W | D | D | W | W | L | L | L | W | W | D | W | W | W | W | W | D | W | D | W |
| Position | 18 | 7 | 6 | 5 | 4 | 7 | 5 | 3 | 2 | 3 | 3 | 5 | 3 | 3 | 1 | 2 | 2 | 2 | 2 | 2 | 4 | 4 | 4 | 4 | 4 | 4 | 4 | 3 | 2 | 1 | 1 | 1 | 1 | 1 |

Source: Competitive matches
A = Away; H = Home; W = Win; D = Draw; L = Loss; = Leader qualified to the 1973–74 European Cup; = Classified to the 1973–74 UEFA Cup; = Relegated to the 1973–74 Segunda División

==== Matches ====
| 3 September 1972 1 | Atlético Madrid | 1–3 | Valencia CF | Madrid |
| | Aragonés 18' | Report | 42', 62' Quino; 71' Adorno | Stadium: Vicente Calderon; Attendance: 60,000; Referee: Emilio Carlos Guruceta Muro |

| 10 September 1972 2 | Real Oviedo | 0–2 | Atlético Madrid | Oviedo |
| | | Report | 26' Gárate; 46' Ovejero | Stadium: Carlos Tartiere; Referee: Ángel Franco Martínez |

| 17 September 1972 3 | Atlético Madrid | 2–1 | Real Betis | Madrid |
| | Mellado 26' (aut); Leal 31' | Report | 36' Del Pozo | Stadium: Vicente Calderon; Referee: Mariano Medina Iglesias |

| 23 September 1972 4 | Real Madrid | 0–1 | Atlético Madrid | Madrid |
| | | Report | 33' Ufarte | Stadium: Santiago Bernabéu; Referee: José Segrelles Del Pilar |

| 1 October 1972 5 | Atlético Madrid | 0–0 | Espanol | Madrid |
| | | Report | | Stadium: Vicente Calderon; Referee: José Navarrete Antiñolo |

| 7 October 1972 6 | Atletico Bilbao | 1–0 | Atlético Madrid | Bilbao |
| | Rojo 8' | Report | | Stadium: San Mamés; Referee: Emilio Carreño Arquimbau |

| 21 October 1972 7 | Atlético Madrid | 2–1 | Real Sociedad | Madrid |
| | Esnaola 43' (aut); Aragonés 63' | Report | 28' Oyarzabal | Stadium: Vicente Calderon; Attendance: 40,000; Referee: Diego Balaguer García |

| 29 October 1972 8 | CD Málaga | 0–1 | Atlético Madrid | Málaga |
| | | Report | 83' Aragonés | Stadium: La Rosaleda; Referee: Fernando Orellana Álvarez |

| 4 November 1972 9 | Atlético Madrid | 5–1 | Celta | Madrid |
| | Salcedo 9', 26'; Irureta 20', 72'; Aragonés 29' | Report | 90' (rig) Domínguez | Stadium: Vicente Calderon; Attendance: 30,000; Referee: José Navarrete Antiñolo |

| 12 November 1972 10 | CD Castellon | 1–1 | Atlético Madrid | Castellón de la Plana |
| | Clarés 77' (rig) | Report | 32' Aragonés | Stadium: Castalia; Referee: Ricardo Canera Coscolín |

| 19 November 1972 11 | Atlético Madrid | 0–1 | Sporting Gijon | Madrid |
| | | Report | 22' Quini | Stadium: Vicente Calderon; Referee: Antonio Rigo Sureda |

| 25 November 1972 12 | UD Las Palmas | 2–2 | Atlético Madrid | Las Palmas |
| | Germán 61' (rig); Páez 78' | Report | 5', 28' Aragonés | Stadium: Insular; Referee: Diego Balaguer García |

| 3 December 1972 13 | Burgos CF | 0–1 | Atlético Madrid | Burgos |
| | | Report | 31' Benegas | Stadium: El Plantío; Referee: Antonio Sánchez Ríos |

| 10 December 1972 14 | Atlético Madrid | 2–0 | CF Barcelona | Madrid |
| | Gárate 23'; Becerra 54' | Report | | Stadium: Vicente Calderon; Attendance: 35,000; Referee: Pelayo Serrano Sancristóbal |

| 17 December 1972 15 | Granada CF | 0–1 | Atlético Madrid | Granada |
| | | Report | 79' Becerra | Stadium: Los Cármenes; Referee: Adolfo Bueno Perales |

| 31 December 1972 16 | Atlético Madrid | 0–0 | Real Zaragoza | Madrid |
| | | Report | | Stadium: Vicente Calderon; Referee: Antonio Rigo Sureda |

| 7 January 1973 17 | Deportivo La Coruna | 1–1 | Atlético Madrid | La Coruña |
| | Loureda 74' | Report | 15' Irureta | Stadium: Riazor; Referee: Antonio Sánchez Ríos |

| 21 January 1973 18 | Valencia CF | 1–2 | Atlético Madrid | Valencia |
| | Pellicer 61' | Report | 43' Gárate; 53' Becerra | Stadium: Luis Casanova; Referee: Emilio Carlos Guruceta Muro |

| 28 January 1973 19 | Atlético Madrid | 2–1 | Real Oviedo | Madrid |
| | Aragonés 24'; Ovejero 29' | Report | 53' Marianín | Stadium: Vicente Calderon; Attendance: 15,000; Referee: Juan María Sáiz Elizondo |

| 4 February 1973 20 | Real Betis | 1–0 | Atlético Madrid | Seville |
| | González 55' (rig) | Report | | Stadium: Benito Villamarín; Referee: Alberto Martín Álvarez |

| 11 February 1973 21 | Atlético Madrid | 1–2 | Real Madrid | Madrid |
| | Becerra 67' | Report | 57' Santillana; 87' Amancio | Stadium: Vicente Calderon; Referee: Sánchez Ibáñez |

| 25 February 1973 22 | Espanol | 2–1 | Atlético Madrid | Barcelona |
| | Amiano 63'; Martínez 87' | Report | 74' Aragonés | Stadium: Sarriá; Referee: Juan María Sáiz Elizondo |

| 4 March 1973 23 | Atlético Madrid | 2–1 | Atletico Bilbao | Madrid |
| | Astrain 7' (aut); Becerra 13' | Report | 61' Viteri | Stadium: Vicente Calderon; Referee: Emilio Carlos Guruceta Muro |

| 11 March 1973 24 | Real Sociedad | 0–1 | Atlético Madrid | San Sebastián |
| | | Report | 87' Irureta | Stadium: Atotxa; Referee: Emilio Carreño Arquimbau |

| 18 March 1973 25 | Atlético Madrid | 1–1 | CD Málaga | Madrid |
| | Adelardo 16' | Report | 36' Vilanova | Stadium: Vicente Calderon; Referee: Vicente Forés Bachero |

| 25 March 1973 26 | Celta | 0–1 | Atlético Madrid | Vigo |
| | | Report | 18' Gárate | Stadium: Balaídos; Referee: Ricardo Canera Coscolín |

| 1 April 1973 27 | Atlético Madrid | 1–0 | CD Castellon | Madrid |
| | Aragonés 56' (pen.) | Report | | Stadium: Vicente Calderon; Attendance: 50,000; Referee: Antonio Tomeo Palanques |

| 8 April 1973 28 | Sporting Gijon | 2–3 | Atlético Madrid | Gijón |
| | Churruca 42'; Megido 50' | Report | 60' Salcedo; 78', 88' Aragonés | Stadium: El Molinón; Referee: Antonio Sánchez Ríos |

| 15 April 1973 29 | Atlético Madrid | 2–1 | UD Las Palmas | Madrid |
| | Irureta 39'; Alberto 53' | Report | 10' Pepe Juan | Stadium: Vicente Calderon; Attendance: 50,000; Referee: Fernando Orellana Álvarez |

| 22 April 1973 30 | Atlético Madrid | 4–2 | Burgos CF | Madrid |
| | Becerra 20'; Irureta 63', 66'; Adelardo 71' | Report | 7' Requejo; 88' Burguete | Stadium: Vicente Calderon; Referee: Andrés Molina Segovia |

| 28 April 1973 31 | CF Barcelona | 0–0 | Atlético Madrid | Barcelona |
| | | Report | | Stadium: Estadio del CF Barcelona; Referee: Emilio Carreño Arquimbau |

| 6 May 1973 32 | Atlético Madrid | 2–1 | Granada CF | Madrid |
| | Aragonés 65', 85' | Report | 47' Chirri | Stadium: Vicente Calderon; Referee: Jaime Oliva Fortuny |

| 13 May 1973 33 | Real Zaragoza | 1–1 | Atlético Madrid | Zaragoza |
| | Rico 72' | Report | 45' Aragonés | Stadium: La Romareda; Referee: Luis Medina Díaz |

| 20 May 1973 34 | Atlético Madrid | 3–1 | Deportivo La Coruna | Madrid |
| | Aragonés 29'; Adelardo 63'; Gárate 65' | Report | 47' Prieto | Stadium: Vicente Calderon; Attendance: 70,000; Referee: Jaime Oliva Fortuny |

=== Copa del Generalísimo ===
==== Fifth round ====
| 12 April 1973 1 | Atlético Madrid | 1–0 | Espanol | Madrid |
| | Irureta 70' | Report | | Stadium: Vicente Calderon; Attendance: 60,000; Referee: José Navarrete Antiñolo |

| 23 May 1973 2 | Espanol | 2–0 | Atlético Madrid | Barcelona |
| | Martínez 53'; De Diego 70' | Report | | Stadium: Sarriá; Attendance: 40,000; Referee: Antonio Sánchez Ríos |

=== European Cup Winners' Cup ===
==== Round of 32 ====
| 14 September 1972 1 | SC Bastia (France) | 0–0 | (Spain) Atlético Madrid | Ajaccio |
| | | Report | | Stadium: François Coty; Referee: (Belgium) Schaut |

| 26 settembre 1972 2 | Atlético Madrid (Spain) | 2–1 | (France) SC Bastia | Madrid |
| | Salcedo 33'; Aragonés 59' | Report | 20' Félix | Stadium: Vicente Calderon; Attendance: 30,000; Referee: (Italy) Gonella |

==== Eightfinals ====
| 25 October 1972 1 | Atlético Madrid (Spain) | 3–4 | (Soviet Union) Spartak Moskva | Madrid |
| | Aragonés 79' (pen.); Ovejero 86'; Bezerra 90' | Report | 42', 87' Redin; 59', 77' Bulgakov | Stadium: Vicente Calderon; Attendance: 22,000; Referee: (East Germany) Glockner |

| 8 November 1972 2 | Spartak Moskva (Soviet Union) | 1–2 | (Spain) Atlético Madrid | Moscow |
| | Chusainvo 59' | Report | 11', 55' Salcedo | Stadium: Dinamo; Attendance: 20,000; Referee: (Austria) Linemayr |

== Statistics ==
=== Squad statistics ===
| Competition | Points | Total | | | | | | GD |
| Competition | Points | G | W | D | L | Gs | Ga | GD |
|---|---|---|---|---|---|---|---|---|
| 1972–73 Primera División | 48 | 34 | 20 | 8 | 6 | 49 | 29 | +20 |
| 1972–73 Copa del Generalísimo | - | 2 | 1 | 0 | 1 | 1 | 2 | -1 |
| 1972–73 European Cup Winners' Cup | - | 4 | 2 | 1 | 1 | 7 | 6 | +1 |
| Total | 48 | 40 | 23 | 9 | 8 | 57 | 37 | +20 |

==== Players statistics ====
| No. | Pos | Nat | Player | Total | | Primera Division | | European Cup Winners' Cup | | Copa del Generalisimo | |
| No. | Pos | Nat | Player | Apps | Goals | Apps | Goals | Apps | Goals | Apps | Goals |
|---|---|---|---|---|---|---|---|---|---|---|---|
| - | GK | (Spain) ESP | Rodri | 22 | -23 | 17 | -17 | 4 | -6 | 1 | 0 |
| - | DF | (Argentina) ARG | Iselín Santos Ovejero | 24 | 3 | 21 | 2 | 2 | 1 | 1 | 0 |
| - | DF | (Spain) ESP | Quique | 24 | 0 | 20+1 | 0 | 2 | 0 | 1 | 0 |
| - | DF | (Spain) ESP | José Luis Capón | 27 | 0 | 20+2 | 0 | 3 | 0 | 1+1 | 0 |
| - | MF | (Paraguay) PAR | Domingo Benegas | 33 | 1 | 27 | 1 | 4 | 0 | 2 | 0 |
| - | MF | (Spain) ESP | Adelardo | 38 | 3 | 33 | 3 | 3 | 0 | 1+1 | 0 |
| - | MF | (Spain) ESP | Alberto Fernández | 32 | 1 | 21+7 | 1 | 2+1 | 0 | 1 | 0 |
| - | MF | (Spain) ESP | Javier Irureta | 36 | 9 | 29+1 | 8 | 4 | 0 | 2 | 1 |
| - | FW | (Spain) ESP | Luis Aragonés | 37 | 18 | 30+2 | 16 | 3 | 2 | 2 | 0 |
| - | FW | (Argentina) ARG | José Eulogio Gárate | 26 | 5 | 24 | 5 | 0 | 0 | 2 | 0 |
| - | FW | (Brazil) BRA | Heraldo Bezerra | 33 | 7 | 24+6 | 6 | 2 | 1 | 0+1 | 0 |
| - | GK | (Spain) ESP | José Pacheco | 18 | -14 | 17 | -12 | 0 | 0 | 1 | -2 |
| - | DF | (Spain) ESP | Francisco Melo | 21 | 0 | 17 | 0 | 3 | 0 | 1 | 0 |
| - | FW | (Spain) ESP | José Ufarte | 29 | 1 | 18+6 | 1 | 3 | 0 | 2 | 0 |
| - | MF | (Spain) ESP | Ignacio Salcedo | 24 | 6 | 16+3 | 3 | 4 | 3 | 1 | 0 |
| - | DF | (Spain) ESP | Julio Iglesias | 19 | 0 | 13+4 | 0 | 2 | 0 | | |
| - | DF | (Spain) ESP | Jesús Martínez Jayo | 18 | 0 | 12+4 | 0 | 1 | 0 | 1 | 0 |
| - | DF | (Spain) ESP | Eusebio Bejarano | 17 | 0 | 12+1 | 0 | 1+1 | 0 | 2 | 0 |
| - | MF | (Spain) ESP | Eugenio Leal | 10 | 1 | 3+6 | 1 | 1 | 0 | | |
| - | FW | (Portugal) POR | Pataco | 1 | 0 | 0+1 | 0 | | | | |
| - | MF | (Spain) ESP | Julio Orozco | 1 | 0 | 0+1 | 0 | | | | |

- Source: https://www.bdfutbol.com/en/t/t1972-737.html
