= 1969–70 Atlético Madrid season =

Atlético Madrid
1969-1970 season
- President: Vicente Calderón
- Head Coach: Marcel Domingo
- Stadium: Manzanares
- Primera Division: Winners (In 1970–71 European Cup)
- Copa del Generalísimo: Eightfinals
- Top goalscorer: League: Gárate; Aragonés (16); All: Aragonés (19)
Home colours

The 1969–70 season was Atlético Madrid's 66th season in existence and the club's 33rd consecutive season in the top flight of Spanish football.

== Summary ==
In the season, the red and white club won its sixth league title, thanks to the French coach and former Atlético player, Marcel Domingo, who arrived from Granada CF and counted on one of the most memorable teams in its history: Rodri, Melo, Ovejero, Eusebius, Calleja, Irureta, Adelardo, Luis Aragonés, Alberto, Ufarte and José Eulogio Gárate.

== Squad ==
Note: Flags indicate national team as defined under FIFA eligibility rules; some limited exceptions apply. Players may hold more than one non-FIFA nationality.

No.	Pos.	Nation	Player
-	GK	ESP	Rodri
-	GK	ESP	Zubiarrain
-	GK	ESP	Miguel San Román
-	DF	ESP	Francisco Melo
-	DF	ESP	Isacio Calleja
-	DF	ESP	Eusebio Bejarano
-	DF	ESP	Jesús Martínez Jayo
-	DF	ESP	Julio Iglesias Santamaría
-	DF	ARG	Iselín Santos Ovejero
-	DF	ESP	Quique

No.	Pos.	Nation	Player
-	MF	ESP	Alberto Fernandez
-	MF	ESP	Adelardo
-	MF	ESP	Ignacio Salcedo
-	MF	ESP	Julio Orozco
-	MF	ESP	José Ufarte
-	FW	ESP	Javier Irureta
-	FW	ESP	Luis Aragonés
-	FW	ESP	Juan Antonio
-	FW	ARG	José Eulogio Gárate

=== Transfers ===
In
Pos.	Name	from	Type
GK	Rodri	Pontevedra CF	loan ended
DF	Iselin Santos	CA Velez Sarsfield	
MF	Alberto Fernandez	Valladolid	
DF	Quique	Valladolid	
MF	Ignacio Salcedo		
DF	Juan Antonio	Murcia	
DF	Mariano Martin	Rayo Vallecano	
DF	Vicente Pastor	Rayo Vallecano	
FW	Domingo Benegas	Club Libertad	
MF	Pataco	CD Ourense	

Out
Pos.	Name	To	Type
DF	Enrique Collar	Valencia CF	
DF	Jorge Griffa	Español	
DF	Colo		
MF	Paquito	Real Valladolid	
MF	Leirós	Rayo Vallecano	

== Competitions ==
=== Primera División ===
==== League table ====
Pos	Team	Pld	W	D	L	GF	GA	GD	Pts	Qualification or relegation
1	Atlético Madrid (C)	30	18	6	6	53	22	+31	42	Qualification for the European Cup first round
2	Atlético Bilbao	30	17	7	6	44	20	+24	41	Invited for the Inter-Cities Fairs Cup
3	Sevilla	30	14	7	9	39	32	+7	35	Invited for the Inter-Cities Fairs Cup
4	Barcelona	30	13	9	8	40	31	+9	35	Invited for the Inter-Cities Fairs Cup
5	Valencia	30	15	5	10	35	23	+12	35	Invited for the Inter-Cities Fairs Cup

Source: BDFútbol
Rules for classification: 1) Points; 2) Head-to-head results; 3) Goal difference; 4) Number of goals scored
(C) Champions

==== Results by round ====
Round	1	2	3	4	5	6	7	8	9	10	11	12	13	14	15	16	17	18	19	20	21	22	23	24	25	26	27	28	29	30
Ground	A	H	H	A	H	A	H	A	H	A	H	A	H	A	H	H	A	A	H	A	H	A	H	A	H	A	H	A	H	A
Result	W	L	W	D	W	D	W	W	W	D	W	W	W	L	L	W	D	W	W	L	W	L	D	D	W	W	W	L	W	W
Position	5	9	6	7	3	4	3	3	2	2	2	1	1	1	2	1	2	1	1	1	1	2	2	2	2	2	1	2	1	1

Source: Competitive matches
A = Away; H = Home; W = Win; D = Draw; L = Loss; = Leader qualified to the 1970–71 European Cup; = Invited to the 1970–71 Inter-Cities Fairs Cup; = Relegated to the 1970–71 Segunda División

==== Matches ====
14 September 1969 1	Sevilla CF	0–1	Atletico Madrid	Sevilla
		Report	61' Gárate	Stadium: Ramón Sánchez-Pizjuán; Referee: Antonio Tomeo Palanques

21 September 1969 2	Atletico Madrid	1–2	UD Las Palmas	Madrid
	Alberto 90'	Report	10' León; 42' Gilberto I	Stadium: Manzanares; Attendance: 45,000; Referee: Sánchez Ibáñez

28 September 1969 3	Atletico Madrid	2–0	Valencia CF	Madrid
	Orozco 52'; Aragonés 60'	Report		Stadium: Manzanares; Referee: Daniel María Zariquiegui Izco

5 October 1969 4	Celta	1–1	Atletico Madrid	Vigo
	Almagro 47'	Report	15' Gárate	Stadium: Balaídos; Referee: Mariano Medina Iglesias

12 October 1969 5	Atletico Madrid	3–1	RCD Mallorca	Madrid
	Aragonés 14', 42'; Gárate 54'	Report	62' Prougenes	Stadium: Manzanares; Referee: Emilio Carlos Guruceta Muro

19 October 1969 6	Granada CF	0–0	Atletico Madrid	Granada
		Report		Stadium: Los Cármenes; Referee: Francisco Cardós Sanchis

26 October 1969 7	Atletico Madrid	2–0	Real Zaragoza	Madrid
	Aragonés 47'; González 65' (o.g.)	Report		Stadium: Manzanares; Referee: Pelayo Serrano Sancristóbal

2 November 1969 8	CF Barcelona	1–2	Atletico Madrid	Barcelona
	Castro 56'	Report	27', 42' Alberto	Stadium: Estadio del CF Barcelona; Referee: Daniel María Zariquiegui Izco

9 November 1969 9	Atletico Madrid	4–1	Elche CF	Madrid
	Gárate 3'; Adelardo 65'; Alberto 66'; Ufarte 77'	Report	23' Vavá	Stadium: Manzanares; Referee: Antonio Tomeo Palanques

15 November 1969 10	Real Madrid	1–1	Atletico Madrid	Madrid
	Fleitas 80'	Report	58' Adelardo	Stadium: Santiago Bernabéu; Attendance: 110,000; Referee: Fernando Pascual Tejerina

23 November 1969 11	Atletico Madrid	2–0	Deportivo La Coruna	Madrid
	Adelardo 9'; Gárate 27'	Report		Stadium: Manzanares; Referee: Gaspar Pintado Viu

30 November 1969 12	Pontevedra CF	1–2	Atletico Madrid	Pontevedra
	Neme 28'	Report	4' Ufarte; 67' Gárate	Stadium: Pasarón; Referee: Antonio Sánchez Ríos

7 December 1969 13	Atletico Madrid	2–1	Atletico Bilbao	Madrid
	Ufarte 4'; Aragonés 17'	Report	42' Zubiaga	Stadium: Manzanares; Referee: Francisco Cardós Sanchis

14 December 1969 14	Real Sociedad	2–1	Atletico Madrid	San Sebastián
	Urreisti 47'; Silvestre 60'	Report	24' (rig) Aragonés	Stadium: Atotxa; Referee: Antonio Tomeo Palanques

21 December 1969 15	Atletico Madrid	0–1	CE Sabadell	Madrid
		Report	48' Vidal	Stadium: Manzanares; Referee: Francisco David Aguado

28 December 1969 16	Atletico Madrid	1–0	Sevilla CF	Madrid
	Adelardo 85'	Report		Stadium: Manzanares; Referee: Mariano Medina Iglesias

4 January 1970 17	UD Las Palmas	2–2	Atletico Madrid	Las Palmas
	Germán 41'; Bosmediano 50'	Report	43' Gárate; 75' Aragonés	Stadium: Insular; Referee: Sánchez Ibáñez

11 January 1970 18	Valencia CF	2–3	Atletico Madrid	Valencia
	Melo 23' (aut); Paquito 36'	Report	67' Irureta; 71', 83' Aragonés	Stadium: Mestalla; Referee: Jaime Oliva Fortuny

18 January 1970 19	Atletico Madrid	4–0	Celta Vigo	Madrid
	Gárate 21', 29', 44'; Aragonés 61' (rig)	Report		Stadium: Manzanares; Referee: Fernando Pascual Tejerina

25 January 1970 20	RCD Mallorca	1–0	Atletico Madrid	Palma
	Domínguez 60'	Report		Stadium: Lluís Sitjar; Referee: Mariano Medina Iglesias

1 February 1970 21	Atletico Madrid	5–0	Granada CF	Madrid
	Gárate 64', 88'; Aragonés 68' (rig), 77'; Adelardo 70'	Report		Stadium: Manzanares; Referee: Joaquim Vilanova Pericas

15 February 1970 22	Real Zaragoza	1–0	Atletico Madrid	Zaragoza
	Ocampos 14'	Report		Stadium: La Romareda; Referee: Emilio Carlos Guruceta Muro

1 March 1970 23	Atletico Madrid	1–1	CF Barcelona	Madrid
	Aragonés 4'	Report	65' Rexach	Stadium: Manzanares; Referee: Sánchez Ibáñez

8 March 1970 24	Elche CF	1–1	Atletico Madrid	Elche
	Asensi 11'	Report	9' Gárate	Stadium: Altabix; Referee: Fernando Pascual Tejerina

15 March 1970 25	Atletico Madrid	3–0	Real Madrid	Madrid
	Aragonés 12', 58'; Gárate 76'	Report		Stadium: Manzanares; Referee: Daniel María Zariquiegui Izco

22 March 1970 26	Deportivo La Coruna	0–1	Atletico Madrid	A Coruña
		Report	81' Salcedo	Stadium: Riazor; Referee: Antonio Tomeo Palanques

29 March 1970 27	Atletico Madrid	2–0	Pontevedra CF	Madrid
	Aragonés 7'; Adelardo 57'	Report		Stadium: Manzanares; Attendance: 40,000; Referee: Pelayo Serrano Sancristóbal

5 April 1970 28	Atletico Bilbao	2–0	Atletico Madrid	Bilbao
	Arieta 47'; Uriarte 68'	Report		Stadium: San Mamés; Referee: Emilio Carlos Guruceta Muro

12 April 1970 29	Atletico Madrid	4–0	Real Sociedad	Madrid
	Gárate 19', 49'; Salcedo 30'; Alberto 64'	Report		Stadium: Manzanares; Attendance: 45,000; Referee: Francisco Cardós Sanchis

19 April 1970 30	CE Sabadell	0–2	Atletico Madrid	Sabadell
		Report	68' Ufarte; 85' Calleja	Stadium: Creu Alta; Referee: Antonio Sánchez Ríos

=== Copa del Generalísimo ===
==== Round of 32 ====
3 May 1970 1	Atletico Madrid	2–0	Cordoba CF	Madrid
	Aragonés 27', 77' (rig)	Report		Stadium: Manzanares; Referee: Sánchez Ibáñez

10 May 1970 2	Cordoba CF	0–2	Atletico Madrid	Cordoba
		Report	18' Salcedo; 27' Aragonés	Stadium: El Arcángel; Referee: Fernando Pascual Tejerina

==== Eightfinals ====
17 May 1970 1	Atletico Madrid	1–1	Atletico Bilbao	Madrid
	Salcedo 44'	Report	74' Arieta	Stadium: Manzanares; Attendance: 60,000; Referee: Joaquim Vilanova Pericas

24 May 1970 2	Atletico Bilbao	2–1	Atletico Madrid	Bilbao
	Uriarte 46'; Rojo 60'	Report	40' Adelardo	Stadium: San Mames; Referee: Antonio Sánchez Ríos

== Statistics ==
=== Squad statistics ===
Competition	Points	Total						GD
Competition	Points	G	W	D	L	Gf	Ga	GD
Primera División	42	30	18	6	6	53	22	+31
Copa del Generalísimo	-	4	2	1	1	7	4	+3
Total	-	34	20	7	7	60	26	+34

=== Players statistics ===
No.	Pos	Nat	Player	Total		Primera Division		Copa del Generalisimo	
No.	Pos	Nat	Player	Apps	Goals	Apps	Goals	Apps	Goals
-	GK	(Spain) ESP	Rodri	28	-20	28	-20		
-	DF	(Spain) ESP	Francisco Melo	30	0	30	0		
-	DF	(Spain) ESP	Eusebio Bejarano	22	0	22	0		
-	DF	(Spain) ESP	Jesús Martínez Jayo	21	0	21	0		
-	DF	(Spain) ESP	Isacio Calleja	23	1	23	1		
-	MF	(Spain) ESP	Alberto Fernandez	29	5	29	5		
-	MF	(Spain) ESP	Adelardo	22	6	22	6		
-	MF	(Spain) ESP	José Ufarte	30	4	30	4		
-	FW	(Spain) ESP	Javier Irureta	23	1	23	1		
-	FW	(Spain) ESP	Luis Aragonés	30	16	30	16		
-	FW	(Argentina) ARG	José Eulogio Gárate	30	16	30	16		
-	GK	(Spain) ESP	Zubiarrain	2	-2	2	-2		
-	FW	(Spain) ESP	Juan Antonio	21	0	21	0		
-	MF	(Spain) ESP	Ignacio Salcedo	20	2	20	2		
-	DF	(Spain) ESP	Julio Iglesias Santamaría	15	0	15	0		
-	DF	(Argentina) ARG	Iselín Santos Ovejero	9	0	9	0		
-	DF	(Spain) ESP	Quique	7	0	7	0		
-	MF	(Spain) ESP	Julio Orozco	4	1	4	1		
-	GK	(Spain) ESP	Miguel San Román						
-	FW	(Paraguay) PAR	Domingo Benegas	0	0	0	0		
-	MF	(Portugal) POR	Pataco	0	0	0	0		

- Source: http://www.bdfutbol.com/en/t/t1969-707.html
