= List of Atlético Madrid players =

Atlético Madrid is a Spanish football club based in Madrid, who currently play in La Liga. The club was founded in 1903.

They are one of the most successful clubs in Spanish football, having won eleven Championship titles, ten Copa del Rey titles, two Supercopas de España, one Copa Presidente FEF and one Copa Eva Duarte. They have won eight European titles: the UEFA Cup Winners' Cup in 1962, the UEFA Europa League in 2010, 2012 and 2018, and the UEFA Super Cup in 2010, 2012 and 2018. They also won the Intercontinental Cup in 1974.

This is a list of its notable players. Generally, this means players that have played 100 or more official matches for the club. However, some players who have played fewer matches are also included; this includes some players who fell just short of the 100 total and players who made significant contributions to the club's history.

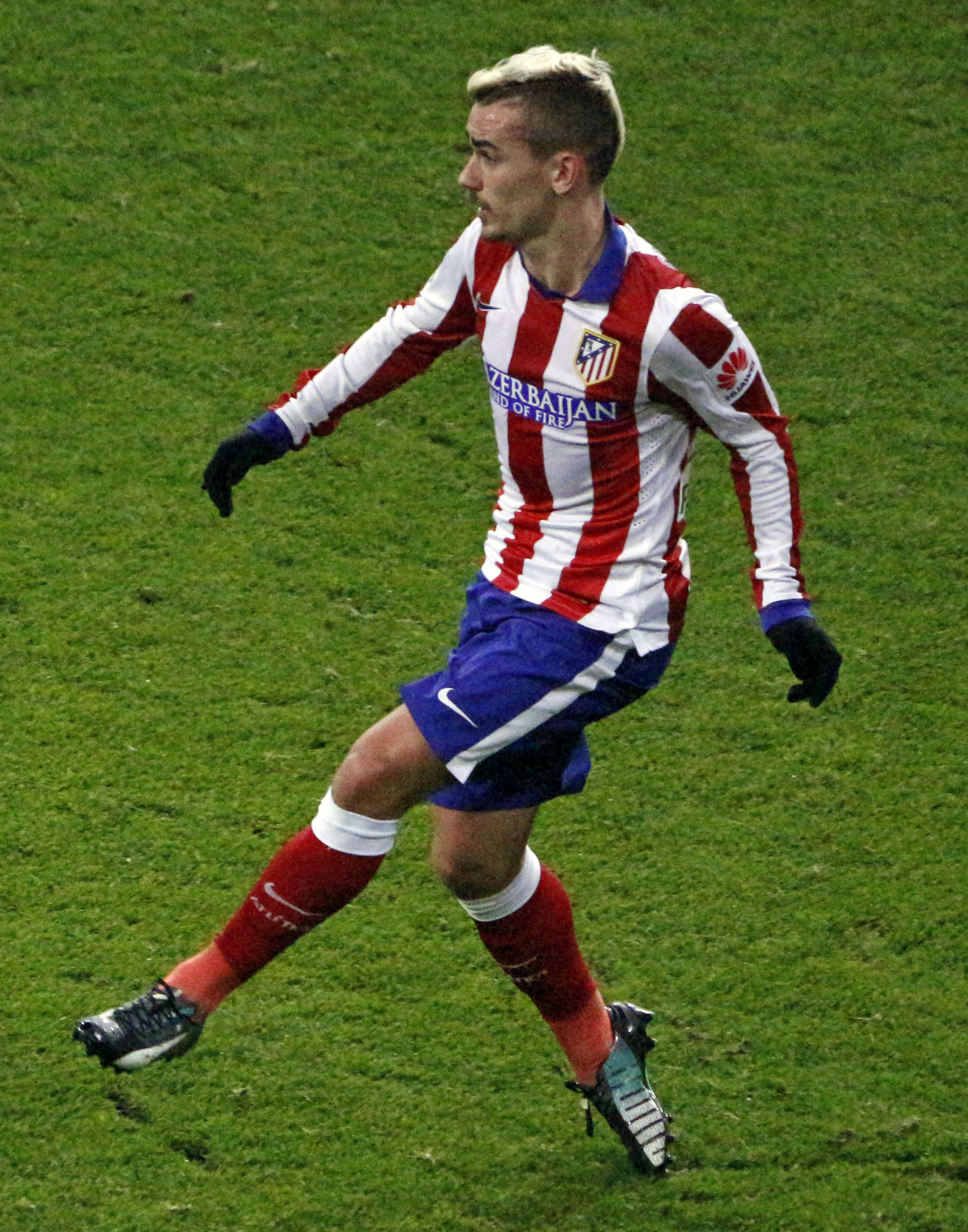
Antoine Griezmann is Atlético's all-time top goalscorer.

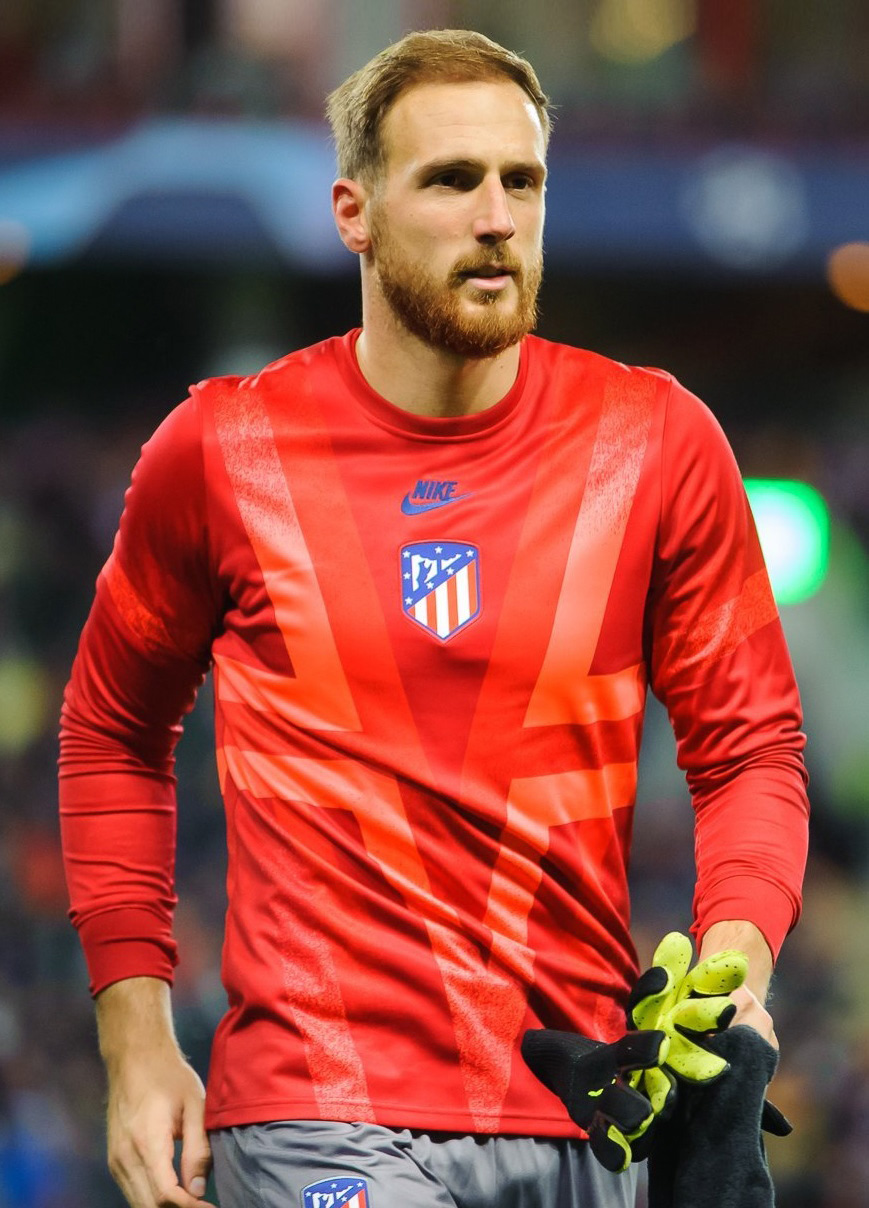
Jan Oblak holds the record as the foreigner with most appearances for Atlético.

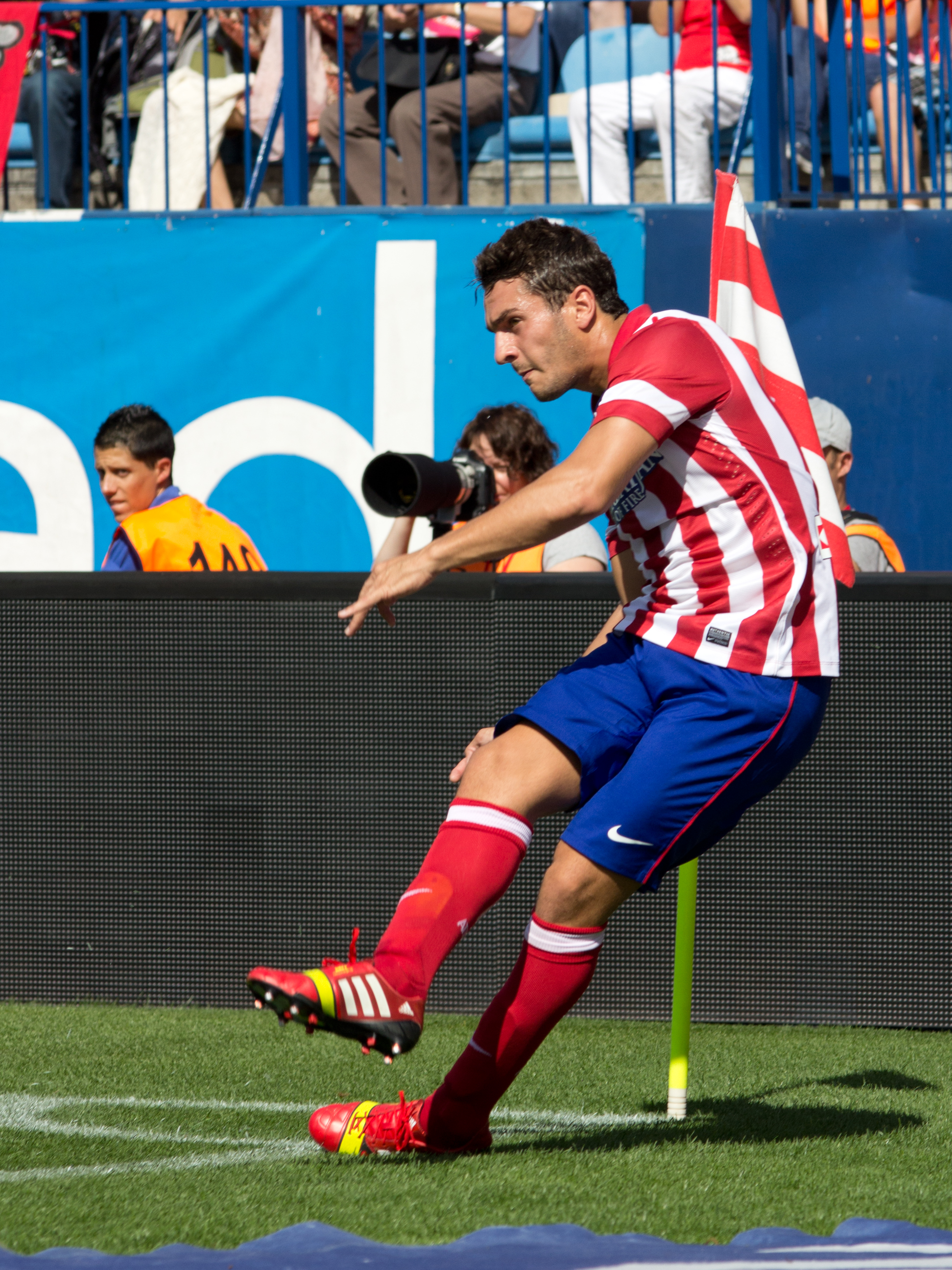
Koke is the club's record appearance maker, and a product of youth academy.

== Players ==
Nationality column refers to the country (countries) represented internationally by the player, if any.

Statistics correct as of 5 June 2026.

Player	Nationality	Position	Atlético Madrid career	Appearances	Goals
Jose Mesa Suarez _{Spanish article}	Spain	DF	1934–1945	109	0
Ramon Gabilondo	Spain	MF	1934–1946	207	12
Francisco Arencibia _{Spanish article}	Spain	MF	1935–1947	141	54
Alfonso Aparicio	Spain	DF	1939–1952	261	5
Germán Gomez Gomez	Spain	MF	1928–1939	227	4
Paco Campos	Spain	CF	1939–1948	248	158
Juan Vázquez	Spain	MF	1939–1947	175	33
José Luis Riera	Spain	DF	1942–1951	178	1
José Juncosa	Spain	CF	1944–1955	217	103
Juan José Mencia	Spain	DF	1944–1954	149	2
Adrián Escudero	Spain	FW	1945–1958	330	169
Alfonso Silva	Spain	MF	1946–1956	153	34
Larbi Ben Barek	Morocco	CF	1948–1954	120	61
Tinte	Spain	DF	1948–1955	140	2
Henry Carlsson	Sweden	MF	1949–1953	95	32
Alberto Callejo	Spain	DF	1951–1963	210	19
José Hernández	Spain	MF	1950–1960	188	3
Ramon Cobo	Spain	DF	1950–1958	145	4
Miguel	Spain	CF	1949–1954	252	73
Enrique Collar	Spain	CF	1952–1969	470	105
Manuel Pazos	Spain	GK	1955–1962	174	0
Joaquin Peiro	Spain	FW	1955–1963; 1970–1971	219	125
Vavá	Brazil	FW	1958–1961	71	31
Feliciano Rivilla	Spain	DF	1958–1968	356	7
Jorge Alberto Mendonça	Portugal	CF	1958–1967	234	91
Edgardo Madinabeytia	Argentina	GK	1958–1967	241	0
Isacio Calleja	Spain	DF	1958–1972	425	7
Ramiro Rodrigues	Brazil	MF	1959–1965	169	32
Jorge Griffa	Argentina	DF	1959–1969	291	8
Adelardo Rodríguez	Spain	MF	1959–1976	553	113
Jesús Glaría	Spain	DF	1960–1968	263	14
Martinez Jayo	Spain	DF	1962–1973	289	4
José Cardona	Honduras	FW	1964–1969	52	20
José Ufarte	Spain	CF	1964–1974	323	34
Luis Aragonés	Spain	MF	1964–1975	370	173
Julio Iglesias	Spain	DF	1966–1973	177	0
José Eulogio Gárate	Spain	FW	1966–1977	325	136
Rodri	Spain	GK	1965–1974	173	0
Javier Irureta	Spain	FW	1967–1975	277	68
Eusebio Bejarano	Spain	DF	1968–1979	283	2
Melo	Spain	DF	1968–1976	244	1
Alberto Fernández	Spain	FW	1969–1979	361	15
Ignacio Salcedo	Spain	MF	1969–1977	223	36
Iselín Ovejero	Argentina	MF	1969–1974	107	4
José Luis Capón	Spain	LB	1970–1980	269	8
Eugenio Leal	Spain	MF	1971–1982	253	33
Domingo Benegas	Paraguay	MF	1972–1978	151	3
Ramón Heredia	Argentina	DF	1973–1977	104	9
Miguel Reina	Spain	GK	1973–1980	216	0
Ruben Ayala	Argentina	CF	1973–1980	214	58
Francisco Bermejo	Spain	MF	1974–1981	194	12
Marcelino	Spain	RB	1974–1984	259	4
Luis Pereira	Brazil	DF	1975–1980	171	17
Leivinha	Brazil	CF	1975–1979	94	43
Ruben Cano	Spain	CF	1976–1982	204	97
Robi	Spain	MF	1976–1981	110	3
Rubio	Spain	WF	1977–1987	329	49
Miguel Ángel Ruiz	Spain	LB	1977–1987	358	25
Juan Carlos Arteche	Spain	DF	1978–1989	421	22
Quique Ramos	Spain	RB	1979–1988	355	33
Roberto Simón Marina	Spain	MF	1979–1990	309	55
Marcos Alonso	Spain	MF	1979–1982; 1987–1989	143	14
Julio Prieto	Spain	MF	1980–1991	253	19
Mario Cabrera	Argentina	CF	1980–1986	170	64
Balbino García	Spain	DF	1980–1986	155	1
Ángel Mejías	Spain	GK	1981–1993	164	0
Hugo Sánchez	Mexico	CF	1981–1985	134	65
Clemente Villaverde	Spain	MF	1981–1987	149	0
Miroslav Votava	Czech Republic	LB	1982–1985	96	9
Jesús Landaburu	Spain	MF	1982–1988	255	34
Tomás Reñones	Spain	RB	1984–1996	483	4
Abel Resino	Spain	GK	1986–1995	303	0
Donato	Brazil	DF	1988–1993	197	14
Patxi Ferreira	Spain	DF	1989–1995	150	5
Paulo Futre	Portugal	CF	1986–1993; 1997–1998	213	51
Carlos Aguilera	Spain	DF	1987–1993; 1996–2005	456	34
Manolo	Spain	CF	1988–1995	271	92
Roberto Solozábal	Spain	DF	1989–1997	290	8
Juan Vizcaíno	Spain	DMF	1990–1998	317	24
Bernd Schuster	Germany	CMF	1990–1993	112	17
Juanito	Spain	DF	1990–1994	142	16
Toni Muñoz	Spain	LB	1990–2001	325	4
Juanma	Spain	DF	1990–2001	205	6
José Luis Caminero	Spain	WF	1993–1998	186	47
Kiko	Spain	CF	1993–2001	278	64
Delfí Geli	Spain	DF	1994–1999	182	11
Diego Simeone	Argentina	DMF	1994–1997; 2003–2005	165	31
José Molina	Spain	GK	1995–2000	248	0
Fernando Correa	Uruguay	FW	1995–2003	175	45
Santiago Denia	Spain	DF	1995–2004	296	9
Milinko Pantić	Serbia and Montenegro	MF	1995–1998	139	36
Roberto Fresnedoso	Spain	MF	1995–2002	184	20
Radek Bejbl	Czech Republic	DMF	1996–2000	147	2
José Mari	Spain	FW	1997–2000; 2002–2003	144	34
Fernando Torres	Spain	CF	2000–2007; 2015–2018	404	129
Antonio López	Spain	LB	2000–2002; 2004–2012	270	13
Gabi	Spain	MF	2003–2007; 2011–2018	417	10
Leo Franco	Argentina	GK	2004–2009	159	0
Pablo Ibáñez	Spain	DF	2004–2010	198	10
Luis Perea	Colombia	DF	2004–2012	314	0
Maxi Rodríguez	Argentina	WF	2005–2010	145	42
Juan Valera	Spain	DF	2005–2008; 2009–2011	103	8
Mario Suárez	Spain	MF	2005–2006; 2010–2015	185	5
Sergio Agüero	Argentina	FW	2006–2011	234	101
Diego Forlán	Uruguay	CF	2007–2011	196	96
Simão Sabrosa	Portugal	LWF	2007–2010	168	32
Raúl García	Spain	MF	2007–2015	329	46
José Antonio Reyes	Spain	WF	2007–2011	147	14
Paulo Assunção	Brazil	DMF	2008–2012	138	1
Tomáš Ujfaluši	Czech Republic	DF	2008–2011	133	2
Álvaro Domínguez	Spain	DF	2008–2012	120	7
David de Gea	Spain	GK	2009–2011	57	0
Koke	Spain	MF	2009–	740	50
Tiago	Portugal	CM	2010–2017	228	20
Filipe Luís	Brazil	DF	2010–2014; 2015–2019	333	12
Diego Godín	Uruguay	DF	2010–2019	389	27
Diego Costa	Spain	FW	2010–2014; 2017–2020	216	83
Juanfran	Spain	DF	2011–2019	355	6
Miranda	Brazil	DF	2011–2015	177	13
Arda Turan	Turkey	MF	2011–2015	178	22
Radamel Falcao	Colombia	FW	2011–2013	91	70
Thibaut Courtois	Belgium	GK	2011–2014	154	0
Saúl	Spain	CMF	2012–2024	427	48
David Villa	Spain	FW	2013–2014	47	15
José Giménez	Uruguay	DF	2013–	382	14
Antoine Griezmann	France	FW	2014–2019; 2021–	501	212
Jan Oblak	Slovenia	GK	2014–	538	0
Lucas Hernandez	France	CMF	2014–2019	110	1
Ángel Correa	Argentina	FW	2015–2025	469	88
Stefan Savić	Montenegro	DF	2015–2024	297	3
Thomas Partey	Ghana	CMF	2015–2020	188	16
Yannick Carrasco	Belgium	AMF	2015–2018; 2020–2023	266	47
Thomas Lemar	France	AMF	2018–2025	186	11
Marcos Llorente	Spain	MF	2019–	300	36
Mario Hermoso	Spain	DF	2019–2024	174	10
Álvaro Morata	Spain	FW	2019–2020; 2022–2024	154	58
Rodrigo De Paul	Argentina	CMF	2021–2025	187	14
Reinildo Mandava	Mozambique	DF	2022–2025	103	2
Nahuel Molina	Argentina	DF	2022–	181	9
Axel Witsel	Belgium	DF	2022–2025	116	3
Pablo Barrios	Spain	CMF	2022–	140	7

== Captains ==
Period	Player
1953–1955	(Spain) José Juncosa
1955–1958	(Spain) Ramón Cobo
1958–1969	(Spain) Enrique Collar
1969–1972	(Spain) Isacio Calleja
1972–1976	(Spain) Adelardo
1976–1977	(Spain) José Eulogio Gárate
1977–1979	(Spain) Alberto
1979–1980	(Spain) José Luis Capón
1980–1982	(Spain) Eugenio Leal
1982–1984	(Spain) Marcelino
1984–1987	(Spain) Miguel Ángel Ruiz
1987–1989	(Spain) Juan Carlos Arteche
1989–1990	(Spain) Roberto Marina
1990–1993	(Portugal) Paulo Futre
1993–1996	(Spain) Tomás
1996–1997	(Spain) Roberto Solozábal
1997–2001	(Spain) Toni
2001–2004	(Spain) Juan Carlos Aguilera
2004–2007	(Spain) Fernando Torres
2007–2010	(Argentina) Maxi Rodríguez
2010–2012	(Spain) Antonio López
2012–2018	(Spain) Gabi
2018–2019	(Uruguay) Diego Godín
2019–	(Spain) Koke

== International honours won while playing at Atlético ==
FIFA World Cup

Below is the list of players who have won the FIFA World Cup as Atlético Madrid players:

- (France) Antoine Griezmann – 2018
- (France) Lucas Hernandez – 2018
- (Argentina) Ángel Correa – 2022
- (Argentina) Nahuel Molina – 2022
- (Argentina) Rodrigo De Paul – 2022
- (Spain) Álex Baena – 2026
- (Spain) Marc Pubill – 2026
- (Spain) Marcos Llorente – 2026

FIFA Confederations Cup

Below is the list of players who have won the FIFA Confederations Cup Atlético Madrid players:

- (Brazil) Juninho Paulista – 1997
- (Brazil) Filipe Luís – 2013

UEFA European Football Championship

Below is the list of players who have won the UEFA European Football Championship Atlético Madrid players:

- (Spain) Feliciano Rivilla – 1964
- (Spain) Isacio Calleja – 1964
- (Greece) Demis Nikolaidis – 2004
- (Spain) Juanfran – 2012
- (Spain) Álvaro Morata – 2024

UEFA Nations League

Below is the list of players who have won the UEFA Nations League Atlético Madrid players:

- (France) Antoine Griezmann – 2021
- (Spain) Álvaro Morata – 2023

Copa América

Below is the list of players who have won the Copa América Atlético Madrid players:

- (Brazil) Baltazar – 1989
- (Uruguay) Diego Forlán – 2011
- (Uruguay) Diego Godín – 2011
- (Brazil) Filipe Luís – 2019
- (Argentina) Ángel Correa – 2021
- (Argentina) Nahuel Molina – 2024
- (Argentina) Rodrigo De Paul – 2024

CONMEBOL–UEFA Cup of Champions

Below is the list of players who have won the CONMEBOL–UEFA Cup of Champions Atlético Madrid players:

- (Argentina) Ángel Correa – 2022
- (Argentina) Rodrigo De Paul – 2022

Olympic Games

Below is the list of players who have won, Football at the Summer Olympics – Men's tournament at the Olympic Games, as Atlético de Madrid Players:

- (Spain) Juanma López – 1992
- (Spain) Roberto Solozábal – 1992
- (Argentina) Sergio Agüero – 2008
- (Spain) Pablo Barrios – 2024
- (Spain) Samu Omorodion – 2024
