= José Mari Martínez (Spanish footballer) =

Spanish footballer (born 1942)

Personal information
- Full name: José María Martínez Muguerza
- Date of birth: 13 November 1942 (age 83)
- Place of birth: Pasajes, Spain
- Height: 1.78 m (5 ft 10 in)
- Position: Defender

Senior career*
Years	Team	Apps	(Gls)
1962–1964	San Sebastián CF		
1964–1976	Real Sociedad	235	(0)
- * Club domestic league appearances and goals

José María Martínez Muguerza (born 13 November 1942) was a Spanish footballer who played as a defender for Real Sociedad between 1962 and 1976. A historical member of Sociedad, he played his entire 14-year career there, thus being a member of the so-called one-club men group.

== Career ==
Born in the Gipuzkoan town of Pasajes on 13 November 1942, Martínez began his career in the youth teams of Pasajes, Touring de Errenteria, from which he joined Real Sociedad Sanse (the B team), then in Tercera División, with whom he scored a total of 2 goals in 54 official matches between 1962 and 1964. Having played two Copa del Rey matches with the first team in the 1963–64 season, he established himself as an undisputed starter in the following season, making his debut for Real Sociedad on 3 May 1964, in a Segunda División fixture against Levante.

On 23 April 1967, Martínez was the captain of the so-called Los héroes de Puertollano ("the heroes of Puertollano"), the town where Sociedad, which included Alberto Ormaetxea, Rafael Mendiluce, and Dionisio Urreisti, secured the long-awaited promotion by drawing against Calvo Sotelo on the final matchday, thus winning the 1966–67 Segunda División. He later stated that this event marked "the beginning of the current Real Sociedad", and recalled that when they returned to Gipuzkoa, they "had no choice but to stop in every town because they set up roadblocks, as everyone wanted to greet us". Two months later, on 5 June, he married, even though his father had died in September of the previous year, leaving him an orphan.

Noted for his morale, hard work, and sacrifice, Martínez was named the best Gipuzkoan sportsman in 1973. As the captain, he played a crucial role in consolidating Sociedad's position in the top flight and participated in two fourth-place finishes in 1974 and 1975, which qualified the club for a European competition for the first time in its history. He played in all 180 minutes of the first round of the 1974–75 UEFA Cup, which ended in a 0–5 aggregate loss to Czechoslovak team Baník Ostrava. The following year, they knocked out Grasshopper, but then loss to the eventual champions Liverpool. Martínez stayed at Real Sociedad for 14 seasons, from 1962 until his retirement in 1976, scoring a total of 1 goal in 373 matches, which ended in 156 wins, 79 draws, and 138 losses, being sent off on two occasions. In total, he played 235 matches in La Liga and four matches in Europa League.

== Later life ==
In 1976, Martínez, along with fellow Sociedad player Patxi Gorriti, founded Gorriti Martínez, a company dedicated to the installation of PVC and aluminum windows. He was also astute in hunting matters. Nicknamed Chino ("Chinaman") due to his slightly slanted eyes, he later became president of the Real Madrid Veterans Association. After his retirement, Martínez joined the club's board of directors, then led by José Luis Orbegozo, whose funeral he attended on 19 January 2010.

Martínez became a regular attendee of the annual dinner hosted by "the heroes of Puertollano", stating that "there's always someone who drops out", either because they are "away or traveling", but "those of us who get together always have a great time, and it is a pleasure to remember every year what we achieved in '67".

== Honours ==
Real Sociedad

- Segunda División:
  - Champions (1): 1966–67
