= 1974 European Cup final =

- Original match programme cover
- Event: 1973–74 European Cup
Atlético Madrid	Bayern Munich
(Spain)	(West Germany)
- Bayern Munich won after a replay
Atlético Madrid	Bayern Munich
1	1
- After extra time
- Date: 15 May 1974
- Venue: Heysel Stadium, Brussels
- Referee: Vital Loraux (Belgium)
- Attendance: 48,722

Replay
Atlético Madrid	Bayern Munich
0	4
- Date: 17 May 1974
- Venue: Heysel Stadium, Brussels
- Referee: Alfred Delcourt (Belgium)
- Attendance: 23,325

The 1974 European Cup final was contested between Atlético Madrid of Spain and Bayern München of West Germany. Goals in extra time from Luis Aragonés and Hans-Georg Schwarzenbeck cancelled each other out, so a replay took place two days later. Bayern won the replay convincingly, with two goals each from Uli Hoeneß and Gerd Müller, giving the German side a 4–0 victory. This is the only European Cup/Champions League final to have been replayed.

== Route to the final ==
Atlético Madrid				Round	Bayern Munich			
Opponent	Agg.	1st leg	2nd leg		Opponent	Agg.	1st leg	2nd leg
(Turkey) Galatasaray	1–0	0–0 (H)	1–0 (A)	First round	(Sweden) Åtvidabergs FF	4–4 (4–3 p)	3–1 (H)	1–3 (a.e.t.) (A)
(Romania) Dinamo București	4–2	2–0 (A)	2–2 (H)	Second round	(East Germany) Dynamo Dresden	7–6	4–3 (H)	3–3 (A)
(Socialist Federal Republic of Yugoslavia) Red Star Belgrade	2–0	2–0 (A)	0–0 (H)	Quarter-finals	(Bulgaria) CSKA Sofia	5–3	4–1 (H)	1–2 (A)
(Scotland) Celtic	2–0	0–0 (A)	2–0 (H)	Semi-finals	(Hungary) Újpesti Dózsa	4–1	1–1 (A)	3–0 (H)

== Match ==
=== Details ===
15 May 1974
20:15 CET

Atlético Madrid (Spain)	1–1 (a.e.t.)	(West Germany) Bayern Munich
Aragonés 114'	Report	Schwarzenbeck 120'

Heysel Stadium, Brussels
Attendance: 48,722
Referee: Vital Loraux (Belgium)

Atlético Madrid	Bayern Munich

GK	1	(Spain) Miguel Reina
SW	2	(Spain) Francisco Melo
RB	3	(Spain) José Luis Capón
CB	4	(Spain) Adelardo Rodríguez (c)
LB	5	(Argentina) Ramón Heredia
RM	6	(Spain) Eusebio
CM	7	(Spain) José Ufarte		(substituted off) 60'
LM	8	(Spain) Luis Aragonés
RF	9	(Spain) José Eulogio Gárate
CF	10	(Spain) Javier Irureta	(yellow card) 86'
LF	11	(Spain) Ignacio Salcedo		(substituted off) 85'
Substitutes:
FW	14	(Spain) Alberto Fernández		(substituted on) 85'
MF	15	(Spain) Heraldo Bezerra		(substituted on) 60'
Manager:
(Argentina) Juan Carlos Lorenzo

GK	1	(West Germany) Sepp Maier
RB	2	(Denmark) Johnny Hansen
CB	4	(West Germany) Hans-Georg Schwarzenbeck
CB	5	(West Germany) Franz Beckenbauer (c)
LB	3	(West Germany) Paul Breitner
CM	8	(West Germany) Rainer Zobel
CM	11	(West Germany) Jupp Kapellmann
CM	6	(West Germany) Franz Roth
RW	7	(Sweden) Conny Torstensson	(substituted off) 75'
LW	10	(West Germany) Uli Hoeneß
CF	9	(West Germany) Gerd Müller
Substitutes:
MF	12	(West Germany) Bernd Dürnberger	(substituted on) 75'
Manager:
(West Germany) Udo Lattek

=== Replay ===
17 May 1974
20:15 CET

Atlético Madrid (Spain)	0–4	(West Germany) Bayern Munich
	Report	Hoeneß 28', 82'; Müller 56', 69'

Heysel Stadium, Brussels
Attendance: 23,283
Referee: Alfred Delcourt (Belgium)

Atlético Madrid	Bayern Munich

GK	1	(Spain) Miguel Reina
RB	2	(Spain) Francisco Melo
CB	3	(Spain) José Luis Capón
CB	4	(Spain) Adelardo Rodríguez (c)		(substituted off) 59'
LB	5	(Argentina) Ramón Heredia
CM	6	(Spain) Eusebio	(yellow card) 51'
CM	7	(Spain) Ignacio Salcedo
CM	8	(Spain) Luis Aragonés
RW	9	(Spain) José Eulogio Gárate
CF	10	(Spain) Alberto Fernández		(substituted off) 65'
LW	11	(Spain) Heraldo Bezerra
Substitutes:
MF	14	(Paraguay) Domingo Benegas	(yellow card) 73'	(substituted on) 59'
FW	16	(Spain) José Ufarte		(substituted on) 65'
Manager:
(Argentina) Juan Carlos Lorenzo

GK	1	(West Germany) Sepp Maier
RB	2	(Denmark) Johnny Hansen
CB	4	(West Germany) Hans-Georg Schwarzenbeck
CB	5	(West Germany) Franz Beckenbauer (c)
LB	3	(West Germany) Paul Breitner
CM	6	(West Germany) Franz Roth
CM	8	(West Germany) Rainer Zobel
CM	11	(West Germany) Jupp Kapellmann
RW	7	(Sweden) Conny Torstensson
LW	10	(West Germany) Uli Hoeneß
CF	9	(West Germany) Gerd Müller	(yellow card) 29'
Manager:
(West Germany) Udo Lattek

== See also ==
- 1973–74 FC Bayern Munich season
- 1974 European Cup Winners' Cup final
- 1974 European Super Cup
- 1974 UEFA Cup final
- Atlético Madrid in European football
- FC Bayern Munich in international football
