= Javier Irureta =

Spanish footballer and manager

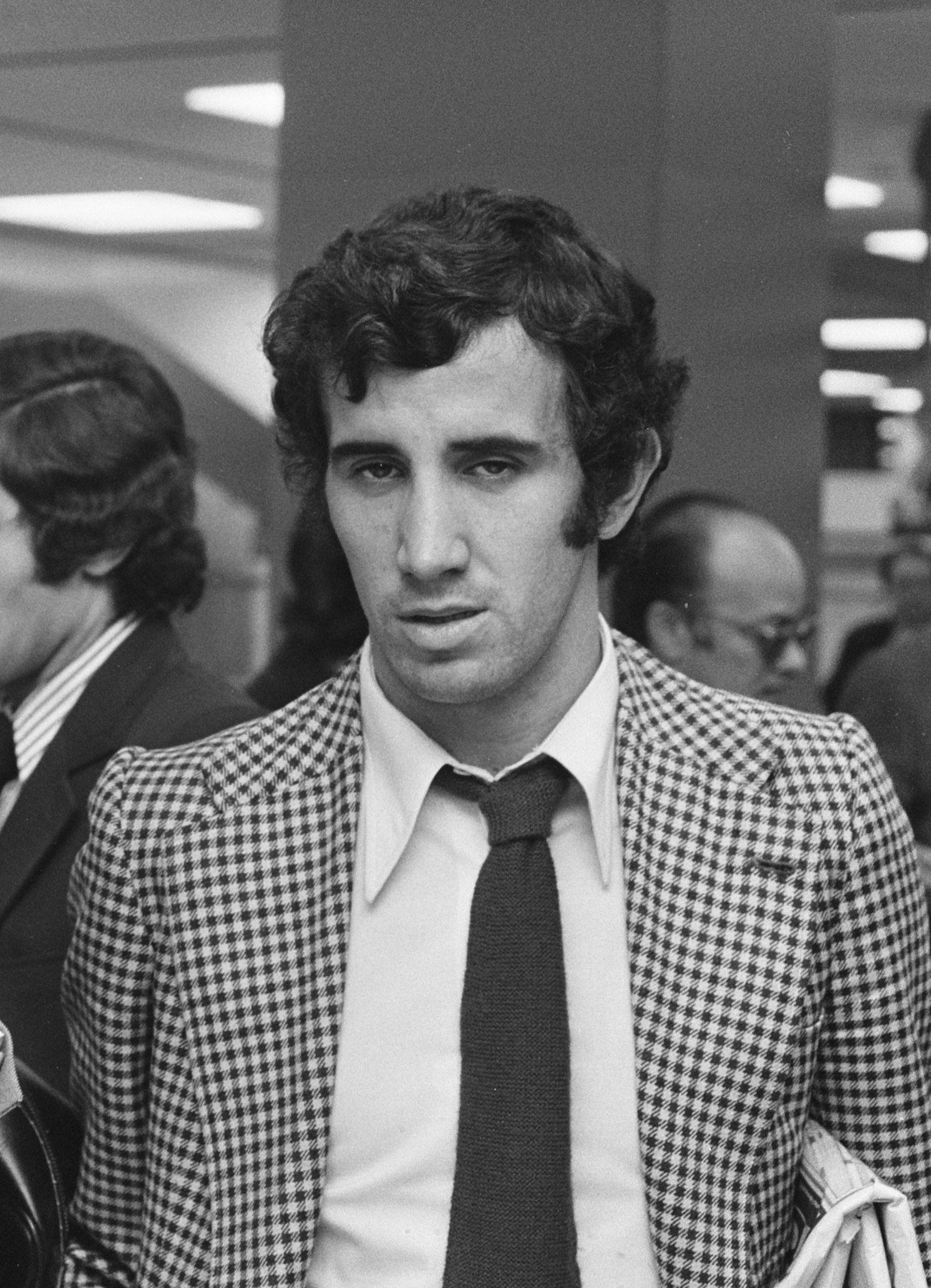
- Irureta in 1973

Personal information
- Full name: Javier Iruretagoyena Amiano
- Date of birth: 1 April 1948 (age 78)
- Place of birth: Irun, Spain
- Height: 1.76 m (5 ft 9 in)
- Position: Attacking midfielder

Senior career*
Years	Team	Apps	(Gls)
1965–1967	Real Unión	48	(14)
1967–1975	Atlético Madrid	208	(48)
1975–1980	Athletic Bilbao	136	(22)
Total		392	(84)

International career
1969–1971	Spain U23	4	(0)
1967	Spain amateur	4	(2)
1972–1975	Spain	6	(0)
1979	Basque Country	1	(0)

Managerial career
- 1984–1988: Sestao
- 1988–1989: Logroñés
- 1989–1993: Real Oviedo
- 1993: Basque Country
- 1993–1994: Racing Santander
- 1994–1995: Athletic Bilbao
- 1995–1997: Real Sociedad
- 1997–1998: Celta Vigo
- 1998–2005: Deportivo La Coruña
- 2006: Real Betis
- 2008: Real Zaragoza
- * Club domestic league appearances and goals

Javier Iruretagoyena Amiano (born 1 April 1948), Irureta for short, is a Spanish retired football attacking midfielder and manager.

He had a distinguished playing career with Atlético Madrid and Athletic Bilbao, playing in 344 La Liga games for both teams combined and scoring 70 goals.

Irureta managed several Spanish top flight clubs, most notably Deportivo. He was the only person to have coached both the two major Galician (Deportivo and Celta Vigo) and Basque (Athletic and Real Sociedad) sides.

== Playing career ==
=== Atlético Madrid ===
Irureta was born in Irun, Gipuzkoa, making his senior debut for local Real Unión in 1965. Two years later he helped them reach the second division play-offs, before joining Atlético Madrid later that year. During his time at the club he was part of a team that won two La Liga titles and a Copa del Rey, playing alongside the likes of Adelardo, Luis Aragonés and José Eulogio Gárate.

The Colchoneros also reached the European Cup final in 1974, but after the winners, Bayern Munich, declined to participate in the Intercontinental Cup, they were invited as runners-up: facing Independiente of Argentina the side won 2–1 on aggregate, with Irureta scoring one of the goals in the 2–0 second-leg home victory.

=== Athletic Bilbao ===
After eight seasons at Atlético, Irureta returned to the Basque Country and signed for Athletic Bilbao. The highlight of his career there was winning two runners-up medals in 1977 – Spanish and UEFA Cups, as among his teammates were veteran José Ángel Iribar and an emerging José Ramón Alexanko.

Irureta retired in 1980 aged 32, with more than 400 official matches to his credit and nearly 100 goals.

=== Spain ===
Irureta won six caps for Spain in a three-year span (exactly two years and 11 months). However, he did not experience a successful time with the national side, and never took part in any major tournament; his debut came on 23 May 1972 in a 2–0 friendly win with Uruguay, in Madrid.

Towards the end of his playing career, Irureta also played one game for the Basque Country national team.

== Coaching career ==
=== Early years and Deportivo ===
As a coach, Irureta started with lowly Sestao Sport Club, narrowly missing out on promotion in 1986–87, and joined Logroñés four years later, then led Real Oviedo to a sixth-place finish in the 1990–91 season, with subsequent qualification to the UEFA Cup – he repeated the feat with Celta Vigo (where he was awarded Manager of the Year titles by both Don Balón and El País) in 1998. In 1994–95 he briefly returned to Athletic Bilbao, then coached neighbours Real Sociedad.

However, Irureta's greatest successes came with Deportivo de La Coruña where he spent seven years, winning another Don Balón coaching accolade in 2000. In his second year he led Depor to its first ever league title, adding runner-up finishes in 2001 and 2002 and third-places in the following two years while also reaching the UEFA Champions League quarter-finals in 2001 and 2002 and the semi-finals in 2004; in 2002 they also won the domestic cup, beating Real Madrid at the Santiago Bernabéu Stadium.

=== Betis ===
Irureta was appointed at Real Betis in June 2006 on a one-year contract, being sacked on 21 December after the team's poor start to the campaign. He stated: "My contract has been rescinded by mutual agreement but I made the first move. We could have continued like this for much longer but it wasn't good".

=== Later career ===
In October 2007, Irureta put his name forward to be the new coach of English club Bolton Wanderers, but lost out in the running to Gary Megson, and was also touted by December as possible replacement for Real Sociedad's Chris Coleman.

Eventually, he took over at Real Zaragoza, after replacing Víctor Fernández. However, on 3 March 2008, after merely one and a half months in charge, he resigned, arguing that never as a manager had he lost four games in a row, and that he did not feel up to the task of stopping the Aragonese side's slump into the relegation zone (eventually, they dropped down a tier). He was quickly replaced by former Zaragoza goalkeeper Manolo Villanova, whom at the time was in charge of Huesca.

== Managerial statistics ==
As of 24 May 2019

Managerial record by team and tenure
Team	Nat	From	To	Record					Ref.
Team	Nat	From	To	G	W	D	L	Win %	Ref.
Sestao	(Spain)	10 June 1984	22 May 1988	186	87	41	58	46.77	
Logroñés	(Spain)	22 May 1988	30 January 1989	21	5	9	7	23.81	
Real Oviedo	(Spain)	27 June 1989	5 February 1993	156	54	49	53	34.62	
Racing Santander	(Spain)	3 July 1993	9 June 1994	42	17	9	16	40.48	
Athletic Bilbao	(Spain)	9 June 1994	20 March 1995	35	13	9	13	37.14	
Real Sociedad	(Spain)	28 November 1995	6 July 1997	72	31	19	22	43.06	
Celta Vigo	(Spain)	6 July 1997	18 May 1998	44	22	9	13	50.00	
Deportivo La Coruña	(Spain)	18 May 1998	31 May 2005	377	187	90	100	49.60	
Real Betis	(Spain)	11 June 2006	22 December 2006	17	4	5	8	23.53	
Real Zaragoza	(Spain)	22 January 2008	3 March 2008	6	1	1	4	16.67	
Career Total				956	421	241	294	44.04	—

== Honours ==
=== Player ===
Atlético Madrid

- La Liga: 1969–70, 1972–73
- Copa del Generalísimo: 1971–72; runner-up: 1974–75
- Intercontinental Cup: 1974
- European Cup runner-up: 1973–74

Athletic Bilbao

- UEFA Cup runner-up: 1976–77
- Copa del Rey runner-up: 1976–77

=== Manager ===
Deportivo

- La Liga: 1999–2000
- Copa del Rey: 2001–02
- Supercopa de España: 2000, 2002

=== Individual ===
- Don Balón Award: Best Coach 1999–2000
