= Quique (footballer, born 1945) =

Spanish footballer (born 1945)

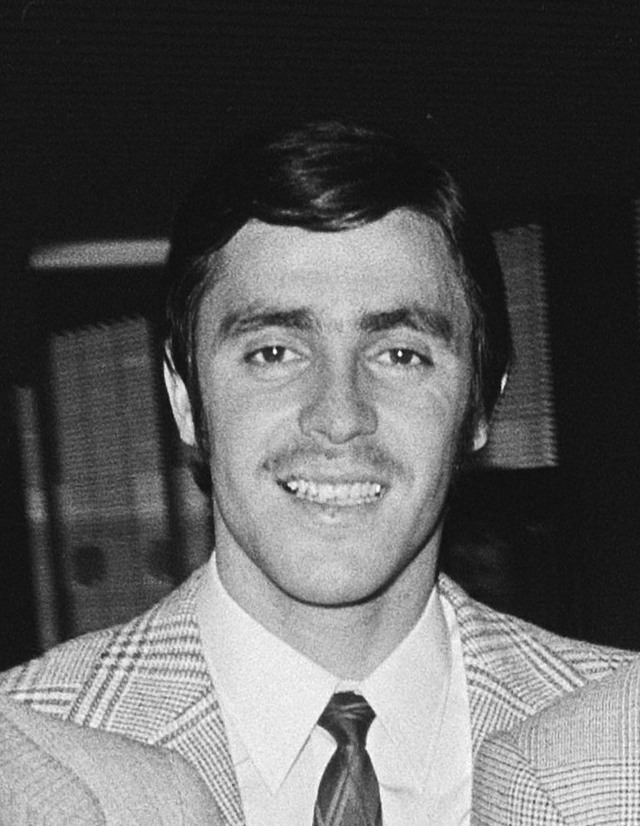
- Quique in 1971

Personal information
- Full name: Enrique Vicente Hernández
- Date of birth: 8 February 1945 (age 81)
- Place of birth: Salamanca, Spain
- Height: 1.80 m (5 ft 11 in)
- Position: Defender

Senior career*
Years	Team	Apps	(Gls)
1964–1969	Real Valladolid	112	(2)
1969–1974	Atlético Madrid	48	(0)
1974–1979	Hércules CF	111	(0)
- * Club domestic league appearances and goals

Enrique Vicente Hernández, (born 8 February 1945) also known as "Quique", (born 8 February or 8 December 1945) is a Spanish former football defender.

Quique began his career with Real Valladolid. He played for Atlético Madrid between 1969 and 1974, winning the Spanish La Liga in 1970 and 1973 and the Copa del Rey in 1972.
