= Iselín Santos Ovejero =

Argentine footballer and manager

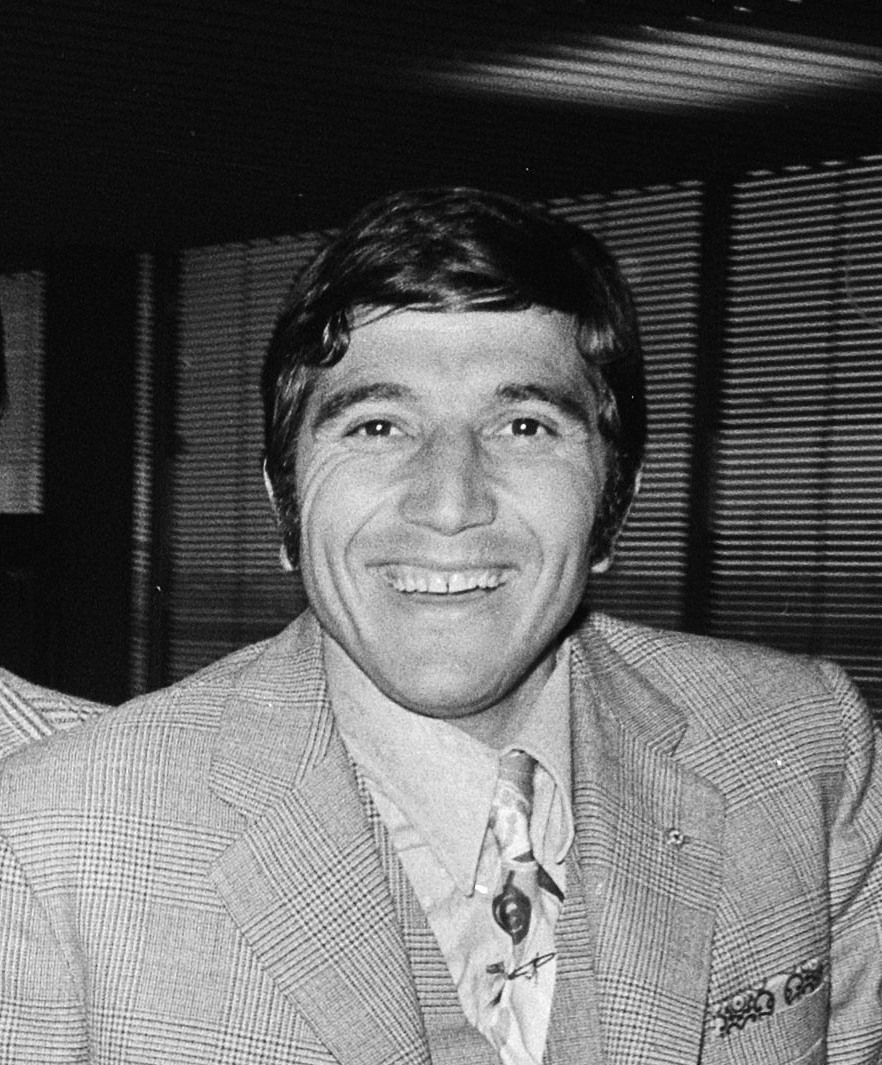
- Iselín Santos Ovejero in 1971

Personal information
- Full name: Iselín Santos Ovejero Maya
- Date of birth: 16 October 1945 (age 81)
- Place of birth: Mendoza, Argentina
- Position: Defender

Senior career*
| Years | Team | Apps | (Gls) |
| 1962–1969 | Vélez Sarsfield | | |
| 1969–1974 | Atlético Madrid | 78 | (3) |
| 1974–1976 | Real Zaragoza | 19 | (0) |
| 1976–1977 | Terrassa | | |
| 1977–1978 | UE Sant Andreu | | |

International career
| 1967 | Argentina | 4 | (0) |

Managerial career
- 1987–1988: Atlético Madrileño
- 1990: Atlético Madrid
- 1991: Atlético Madrid
- 1993: Atlético Madrid
- 1993: Atlético Madrid
- 1994: Atlético Madrid
- * Club domestic league appearances and goals

Iselín Santos Ovejero Maya (born 16 October 1945) is a retired Argentinian footballer.

== Career ==
Ovejero began his career with Club Atlético Vélez Sarsfield, where he would win the 1968 Argentine first division. He played for Atlético Madrid between 1969 and 1974, winning the Spanish La Liga in 1970 and 1973, and the Copa del Rey in 1972. He also played for the Argentina national football team in the 1967 South American Championship.

As a coach, he also managed Atlético Madrid for 7 games between 1990 and 1991. Under his management, Atletico Madrid won 1991 Copa del Rey.

== Honours ==
Player

Atlético Madrid

- Copa del Generalísimo: 1971-72
- Spanish League: 1969-70, 1972-73

Manager

Atlético Madrid

- Copa del Rey: 1990-91
