= Ignacio Salcedo =

Spanish footballer

Personal information
- Full name: Ignacio María Salcedo Sánchez
- Date of birth: 22 May 1947 (age 79)
- Place of birth: Madrid, Spain
- Position: Midfielder

Senior career*
| Years | Team | Apps | (Gls) |
| 1969–1977 | Atlético Madrid | 167 | (19) |
| 1978 | Toronto Metros-Croatia | 7 | (0) |
| 1978 | Southern California Lazers | 12 | (6) |

International career
| 1969 | Spain amateur | 1 | (0) |
- * Club domestic league appearances and goals

Ignacio María Salcedo Sánchez (born 22 May 1947 in Madrid, Spain) is a Spanish former footballer.

He played for Atlético de Madrid between 1969 and 1977, winning the Spanish League in 1970, 1973, and 1976, the Spanish Cup in 1972 and 1976, and the Intercontinental Cup in 1975. He played in the 1974 European Cup Final, which Atlético lost.

== Honours ==
Atlético Madrid

- Intercontinental Cup: 1974
- Copa del Generalísimo: 1971-72, 1975-76
- Spanish League: 1969-70, 1972-73, 1976-77
