= Rafael Viteri =

Spanish footballer (1952–2025)

Personal information
- Full name: Rafael María Viteri Chavarri
- Date of birth: 11 July 1952
- Place of birth: Bilbao, Spain
- Date of death: 27 December 2025 (aged 73)
- Place of death: Logroño, Spain
- Height: 1.85 m (6 ft 1 in)
- Position: Forward

Youth career
- Athletic Bilbao

Senior career*
Years	Team	Apps	(Gls)
1970–1972	Bilbao Athletic	67	(31)
1972–1973	Athletic Bilbao	14	(4)
1973–1980	Burgos	147	(33)
Total		228	(68)

Managerial career
- 1980: Burgos Promesas
- * Club domestic league appearances and goals

Rafael María Viteri Chavarri (11 July 1952 – 27 December 2025) was a Spanish footballer who played as a forward. He played 78 La Liga games and scored 19 goals for Athletic Bilbao and Burgos, as well as 83 games and 18 goals for the latter in the Segunda División, winning the title in 1975–76.

== Career ==
Born in Bilbao, Viteri began his career at Athletic Bilbao, making 14 appearances and scoring four goals for the first team in La Liga in 1972–73. He scored on his debut on 19 November 1972, opening a 4–1 loss away to Valencia, and added two more goals a week later in a 3–3 home draw with Real Oviedo.

Viteri then moved to Burgos, where he contributed 12 goals to their promotion as champions of the Segunda División in 1975–76. He scored 15 top-flight goals over the next two seasons, but injuries led to his retirement aged 28, following relegation in 1979–80.

== Death ==
On 27 December 2025 Viteri died in Logroño, where he had lived for his final years. He was 73. Athletic announced that their players would wear black armbands away to Osasuna for their next game, in memory of Viteri and of Juanan López, who had died the day before.
