= Zubiarraín =

Spanish footballer

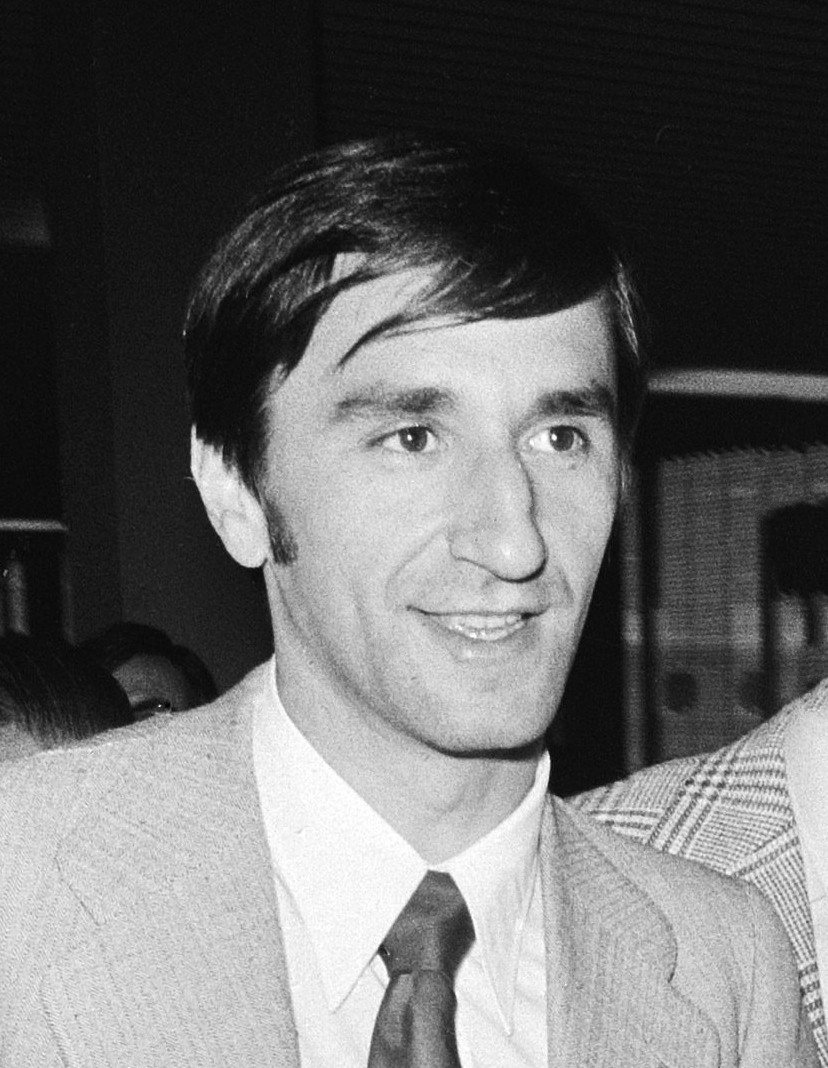
- Zubiarraín in 1971

Personal information
- Date of birth: 22 September 1945
- Place of birth: San Sebastián, Spain
- Date of death: 1 June 1993 (aged 47)
- Height: 1.80 m (5 ft 11 in)
- Position: Goalkeeper

Senior career*
Years	Team	Apps	(Gls)
1966–1968	Real Sociedad		(0)
1969–1973	Atlético Madrid		(0)
- * Club domestic league appearances and goals

Jesús María Zubiarraín Arguiñano known as Zubiarraín (22 September 1945 – 1 June 1993) was a Spanish football goalkeeper.

Zubiarrain began his career with Real Sociedad in 1966. He played for Atlético Madrid between 1969 and 1973, winning the Spanish La Liga in 1970 and 1973 and the Copa del Rey in 1972.
