= Alberto Fernández (footballer, born 1943) =

Spanish footballer

Personal information
- Full name: Alberto Fernández Fernández
- Date of birth: November 19, 1943 (age 82)
- Place of birth: Candás, Asturias, Spain
- Height: 1.76 m (5 ft 9 in)
- Position: Midfielder

Senior career*
Years	Team	Apps	(Gls)
1962–1968	Sporting Gijón	110	(16)
1968–1969	Valladolid	35	(5)
1969–1979	Atlético Madrid	279	(19)
- * Club domestic league appearances and goals

Alberto Fernández Fernández (born 19 November 1943) is a former Spanish footballer.

== Career ==
He played for Atlético de Madrid between 1969 and 1979, winning the Spanish League in 1970, 1973, and 1977, the Intercontinental Cup in 1974, and the Spanish Cup in 1972 and 1976. Fernández played in the 1974 European Cup Final, which Atlético lost.

== Honours ==
Atlético Madrid

- Spanish League: 1969–70, 1972–73, 1976–77
- Copa del Generalísimo: 1971–72, 1975–76
- Intercontinental Cup: 1974
