= Marianín =

Spanish footballer

Personal information
- Full name: Mariano Arias Chamorro
- Date of birth: 18 May 1946 (age 80)
- Place of birth: Fabero, Spain
- Height: 1.75 m (5 ft 9 in)
- Position: Striker

Youth career
- Deportivo Fabero

Senior career*
Years	Team	Apps	(Gls)
1966–1967	Atlético Bembibre		
1967–1972	Cultural Leonesa		
1972–1977	Oviedo	120	(56)
1977–1978	Cultural Leonesa		
1978–1979	Deportivo Fabero		

International career
1973	Spain	1	(0)
- * Club domestic league appearances and goals

Mariano Arias Chamorro (born 18 May 1946), known as Marianín, is a Spanish retired footballer who played as a striker.

== Club career ==
Born in Fabero, Province of León, Marianín started playing organized football with local CA Bembibre, signing with Cultural y Deportiva Leonesa in 1967 and helping it promote to Segunda División four years later by scoring a country-best 36 goals. He was subsequently signed by Real Oviedo, making his La Liga debut on 2 September 1972 and netting his team's goal in a 1–2 away loss against UD Las Palmas.

Marianín won the Pichichi Trophy in 1972–73, helping the Asturian team finish in 12th position. None of his 19 successful strikes came from the penalty spot, and highlights included a hat-trick in a 3–3 draw at Athletic Bilbao on 26 November 1972, becoming the second club player to receive this award.

Marianín suffered top flight relegation in 1974, but he contributed with a career-best – at the professional level – 20 goals to help his side gain promotion at the first attempt. He left Oviedo in June 1977 at the age of 31, retiring two years later after spells with Cultural and Deportivo Fabero. in total, he scored 65 times for his main club in all competitions.

== International career ==
Marianín earned one cap for the Spain national team. It consisted of a second-half substitute appearance in a 0–0 friendly draw against Turkey, on 17 October 1973.
