= José Luis Capón =

Spanish footballer (1948–2020)

Personal information
- Full name: José Luis Capón González
- Date of birth: 6 February 1948
- Place of birth: Madrid, Spain
- Date of death: 29 March 2020 (aged 72)
- Place of death: Madrid, Spain
- Position: Defender

Youth career
- Plus Ultra
- 1969–1970: Reyfra

Senior career*
Years	Team	Apps	(Gls)
1970–1980	Atlético Madrid	200	(6)
1971–1972	→ Burgos (loan)	32	(2)
1980–1981	Elche	32	(2)
Total		264	(10)

International career
1971	Spain U23	1	(0)
1969–1972	Spain amateur	6	(0)
1973–1977	Spain	13	(1)
- * Club domestic league appearances and goals

José Luis Capón González (6 February 1948 – 29 March 2020) was a Spanish footballer from Madrid.

He played for Atlético Madrid between 1970 and 1980, winning the Spanish League in 1973 and 1977, the Spanish Cup in 1976, and the Intercontinental Cup in 1974. He played in the 1974 European Cup Final, which Atlético lost.

He died on 29 March 2020 at the age of 72 from pneumonia resulting from COVID-19.

== International goals ==
#	Date	Venue	Opponent	Score	Result	Competition
1.	12 October 1975	Sarrià, Barcelona, Spain	Denmark	2–0	2–0	UEFA Euro 1976 qualifying

== Honours ==
Atlético Madrid

- Intercontinental Cup: 1974
- Spanish League: 1972–73, 1976–77
- Spanish Cup: 1975–76
