= 1966–67 Segunda División =

36th season of the second-tier football league in Spain

Segunda División
- Season: 1966–67
- Champions: Real Sociedad; Málaga
- Promoted: Real Sociedad; Málaga; Real Betis
- Relegated: Logroñés; Algeciras; Indauchu; Condal
- Matches: 480
- Goals: 1,210 (2.52 per match)
- Top goalscorer: Francisco Solabarrieta (24 goals)
- Best goalkeeper: Américo Canas (0.64 goals/match)
- Biggest home win: Rayo Vallecano 8–0 Logroñés (25 September 1966)
- Biggest away win: Osasuna 1–5 Ferrol (25 September 1966); Logroñés 0–4 Osasuna (11 December 1966); Ferrol 0–4 Oviedo (12 March 1967); Racing Santander 0–4 Celta Vigo (26 March 1967)
- Highest scoring: Real Gijón 5–4 Oviedo (20 November 1966); Burgos 7–2 Gimnástica Torrelavega (18 December 1966); Mestalla 7–2 Condal (6 January 1967)

The 1966–67 Segunda División season was the 36th since its establishment and was played between 11 September 1966 and 23 April 1967.

== Overview before the season ==
32 teams joined the league, including 3 relegated from the 1965–66 La Liga and 4 promoted from the 1965–66 Tercera División.

Relegated from La Liga

- Málaga
- Mallorca
- Real Betis

Promoted from Tercera División

- Ferrol
- Gimnástica Torrelavega
- Logroñés
- Castellón

== Group North ==
=== Teams ===
Location of teams in Segunda División 1966-67 Group North
Canary Islands

Club	City	Stadium
Burgos CF	Burgos	El Plantío
CF Calvo Sotelo	Puertollano	Calvo Sotelo
RC Celta Vigo	Vigo	Balaídos
Club Ferrol	Ferrol	Manuel Rivera
Real Gijón	Gijón	El Molinón
Gimnástica de Torrelavega	Torrelavega	El Malecón
SD Indauchu	Bilbao	Garellano
UP Langreo	Langreo	Ganzábal
CD Logroñés	Logroño	Las Gaunas
CA Osasuna	Pamplona	San Juan
Real Oviedo	Oviedo	Carlos Tartiere
Rayo Vallecano	Madrid	Vallecas
Real Sociedad	San Sebastián	Atocha
Real Santander	Santander	El Sardinero
CD Tenerife	Santa Cruz de Tenerife	Heliodoro Rodríguez López
Real Valladolid	Valladolid	José Zorrilla

=== League table ===
Pos	Team	Pld	W	D	L	GF	GA	GD	Pts	Promotion, qualification or relegation
1	Real Sociedad (P)	30	21	4	5	46	22	+24	46	Promotion to La Liga
2	Real Gijón	30	19	7	4	55	22	+33	45	Qualification for the promotion playoffs
3	Celta Vigo	30	14	8	8	43	25	+18	36	
4	Osasuna	30	13	9	8	52	39	+13	35 (Note: Osasuna finished ahead of Oviedo on head-to-head points: Osasuna–Oviedo 4–2, Oviedo–Osasuna 1–1)	
5	Oviedo	30	15	5	10	57	38	+19	35	
6	Rayo Vallecano	30	13	4	13	45	31	+14	30 (Note: Rayo Vallecano finished ahead of Ferrol and Calvo Sotelo on head-to-head points: Rayo Vallecano 5 pts, Ferrol 4 pts, Calvo Sotelo 3 pts)	
7	Ferrol	30	13	4	13	41	30	+11	30	
8	Calvo Sotelo	30	10	10	10	38	38	0	30	
9	Valladolid	30	11	7	12	38	43	−5	29	
10	Gimnástica Torrelavega	30	12	4	14	33	53	−20	28 (Note: Gimnástica Torrelavega finished ahead of Tenerife on head-to-head goal difference: Tenerife–Gimnástica Torrelavega 1–0, Gimnástica Torrelavega–Tenerife 3–1)	
11	Tenerife	30	11	6	13	40	47	−7	28	
12	Racing Santander	30	12	2	16	42	53	−11	26	
13	Langreo (O)	30	9	7	14	32	42	−10	25	Qualification for the relegation playoffs
14	Burgos (O)	30	7	9	14	40	49	−9	23	Qualification for the relegation playoffs
15	Logroñés (R)	30	5	8	17	16	47	−31	18	Relegation to Tercera División
16	Indauchu (R)	30	5	6	19	17	56	−39	16	Relegation to Tercera División

Source: BDFútbol
Rules for classification: 1) points; 2) head-to-head points; 3) head-to-head goal difference; 4) goal difference; 5) number of goals scored
(O) Play-off winners; (P) Promoted; (R) Relegated

=== Top goalscorers ===
Goalscorers	Goals	Team
(Spain) Francisco Solabarrieta	24	Real Gijón
(Spain) Francisco Docal	18	Racing Santander
(Spain) Abel Fernández	17	Celta Vigo
(Spain) Alfonso Fanjul	17	Osasuna
(Spain) José Luis Quirós	15	Oviedo

=== Top goalkeepers ===
Goalkeeper	Goals	Matches	Average	Team
(Spain) Jesús Zubiarrain	21	30	0.7	Real Sociedad
(Spain) José Ramón Ibarreche	19	25	0.76	Celta Vigo
(Spain) Andrés Mendieta	20	23	0.87	Rayo Vallecano
(Spain) Juan Zumalabe	29	30	0.97	Ferrol
(Spain) Lucrecio Luquin	23	21	1.1	Osasuna

=== Results ===
Home \ Away	BUR	CAL	CEL	FER	GIJ	GIM	IND	LAN	LOG	OSA	OVI	RAY	RSO	SAT	TEN	VLD
Burgos	—	0–0	1–0	1–0	0–2	7–2	4–0	0–1	4–1	1–1	1–0	1–4	0–2	1–1	2–0	1–1
Calvo Sotelo	2–0	—	1–3	2–1	1–0	4–0	0–0	1–0	2–0	1–1	3–0	2–2	2–2	3–1	3–1	2–2
Celta Vigo	1–1	2–1	—	3–1	0–0	4–2	4–0	2–1	2–0	3–0	0–2	1–0	0–1	4–2	4–1	1–1
Ferrol	4–0	2–1	0–0	—	3–1	3–0	4–1	0–0	0–0	0–2	0–4	3–0	0–1	2–0	4–1	1–0
Gijón	2–1	3–0	1–0	1–0	—	0–0	4–0	3–1	1–0	4–0	5–4	2–1	2–1	5–1	3–0	4–1
Gimn. Torrelavega	1–0	1–0	1–2	0–0	0–1	—	2–1	3–2	2–1	2–3	2–1	2–1	1–1	2–1	3–1	1–0
Indauchu	2–2	0–0	1–0	0–1	0–3	2–0	—	2–1	0–0	0–1	0–2	2–1	1–2	2–3	1–0	1–1
Langreo	3–3	0–1	0–0	2–1	1–1	0–1	3–0	—	1–0	2–1	1–2	2–1	0–1	1–2	1–0	1–1
Logroñés	0–0	0–0	1–2	0–1	0–1	2–2	1–0	0–0	—	0–4	2–0	0–1	0–3	0–1	1–1	1–0
Osasuna	1–1	1–1	2–0	1–5	1–1	3–0	3–0	1–1	4–1	—	4–2	0–0	3–0	2–1	4–1	2–1
Oviedo	5–1	3–1	1–1	2–1	0–0	3–1	5–0	1–4	0–1	1–1	—	0–1	2–2	2–0	3–1	6–1
Rayo Vallecano	2–1	1–0	0–0	3–2	3–1	2–1	0–0	6–0	8–0	3–2	0–1	—	0–1	3–0	2–0	0–1
Real Sociedad	2–1	3–1	2–0	1–0	1–0	5–0	1–0	1–0	3–0	1–0	1–0	1–0	—	3–0	0–0	2–0
Santander	5–3	4–0	0–4	1–0	0–2	0–1	2–0	1–2	0–0	3–2	0–1	1–0	4–0	—	4–2	4–2
Tenerife	2–1	3–3	0–0	2–1	1–1	1–0	3–0	4–0	3–1	1–0	2–2	1–0	2–1	3–0	—	3–0
Valladolid	2–1	2–0	1–0	0–1	1–1	2–0	3–1	2–1	1–3	2–2	1–2	3–0	3–1	1–0	2–0	—

Source: BDFútbol
Legend: Blue = home team win; Yellow = draw; Red = away team win.

== Group South ==
=== Teams ===
Location of teams in Segunda División 1966-67 Group South

Club	City	Stadium
Algeciras CF	Algeciras	El Mirador
CF Badalona	Badalona	Avenida de Navarra
Real Betis	Seville	Benito Villamarín
Cádiz CF	Cádiz	Ramón de Carranza
CD Castellón	Castellón de la Plana	Castalia
Atlético Ceuta	Ceuta	Alfonso Murube
CD Condal	Barcelona	CF Barcelona
CD Constancia	Inca	Campo Nuevo
CD Europa	Barcelona	Cerdeña
UD Lérida	Lérida	Campo de Deportes
Levante UD	Valencia	Vallejo
CD Málaga	Málaga	La Rosaleda
RCD Mallorca	Palma de Mallorca	Luis Sitjar
CD Mestalla	Valencia	Mestalla
Real Murcia	Murcia	La Condomina
Recreativo de Huelva	Huelva	Municipal

=== League table ===
Pos	Team	Pld	W	D	L	GF	GA	GD	Pts	Promotion, qualification or relegation
1	Málaga (P)	30	19	6	5	44	18	+26	44	Promotion to La Liga
2	Real Betis (O, P)	30	18	4	8	47	26	+21	40	Qualification for the promotion playoffs
3	Castellón	30	15	7	8	42	24	+18	37 (Note: Castellón finished ahead of Levante on head-to-head goal difference: Castellón–Levante 2–0, Levante–Castellón 1–0)	
4	Levante	30	16	5	9	41	26	+15	37	
5	Mallorca	30	14	7	9	45	30	+15	35	
6	Europa	30	12	8	10	29	33	−4	32 (Note: Europa finished ahead of Murcia on head-to-head points: Murcia–Europa 0–1, Europa–Murcia 3–0)	
7	Murcia	30	14	4	12	39	36	+3	32	
8	Cádiz	30	11	7	12	35	41	−6	29 (Note: Cádiz finished ahead of Mestalla on overall goal difference)	
9	Mestalla	30	12	5	13	45	53	−8	29	
10	Badalona	30	11	5	14	32	40	−8	27	
11	Recreativo	30	8	9	13	31	34	−3	25	
12	Lleida	30	8	8	14	30	40	−10	24 (Note: Lleida finished ahead of Atlético Ceuta on head-to-head goal difference: Atlético Ceuta–Lleida 1–0, Lleida–Atlético Ceuta 3–0)	
13	Atlético Ceuta (O)	30	10	4	16	31	44	−13	24	Qualification for the relegation playoffs
14	Constancia (O)	30	6	10	14	29	41	−12	22 (Note: Constància finished ahead of Algeciras on head-to-head goal difference: Constància–Algeciras 3–0, Algeciras–Constància 1–0)	Qualification for the relegation playoffs
15	Algeciras (R)	30	7	8	15	22	36	−14	22	Relegation to Tercera División
16	Condal (R)	30	8	5	17	33	53	−20	21	Relegation to Tercera División

Source: BDFútbol
Rules for classification: 1) points; 2) head-to-head points; 3) head-to-head goal difference; 4) goal difference; 5) number of goals scored
(O) Play-off winners; (P) Promoted; (R) Relegated

=== Top goalscorers ===
Goalscorers	Goals	Team
(Brazil) Wanderley Machado	19	Levante
(Spain) Serafín García	19	Murcia
(Spain) Joseíto	13	Constància
(Spain) Manuel Folch	11	Castellón
(Spain) Jesús María Landa	10	Real Betis

=== Top goalkeepers ===
Goalkeeper	Goals	Matches	Average	Team
(Spain) Américo Canas	16	25	0.64	Málaga
(Spain) Antonio Ramírez	23	29	0.79	Castellón
(Spain) José Campillo	26	30	0.87	Real Betis
(Spain) Francisco Catalá	26	30	0.87	Levante
(Spain) Rogelio Pàmpols	33	29	1.14	Europa

=== Results ===
Home \ Away	ALG	BAD	BET	CÁD	CAS	CEU	CND	CNS	EUR	LÉR	LEV	MGA	MLL	MES	MUR	REC
Algeciras	—	3–0	0–1	2–1	1–0	1–0	1–2	1–0	1–1	1–0	1–2	0–1	1–1	0–0	1–1	1–1
Badalona	3–0	—	0–3	1–1	1–1	2–0	2–0	1–0	1–0	3–1	1–1	1–1	2–3	3–1	1–0	2–1
Betis	1–0	2–0	—	2–2	0–3	1–0	3–0	3–1	0–1	2–1	2–0	2–1	2–1	5–0	2–0	2–0
Cádiz	1–1	2–1	1–0	—	2–0	0–1	2–0	1–1	3–0	2–0	3–2	1–0	2–3	2–1	1–2	1–1
Castellón	2–1	3–0	1–1	5–1	—	5–1	3–0	1–1	2–0	1–0	2–0	1–1	1–2	1–2	2–1	1–1
Atlético Ceuta	3–0	1–3	1–0	0–1	0–0	—	3–1	2–1	2–0	1–0	2–0	0–2	0–0	1–1	1–2	4–2
Condal	1–0	1–0	0–2	0–1	0–1	2–1	—	1–2	2–2	3–1	1–2	1–2	2–1	4–1	2–0	1–1
Constancia	3–0	2–2	3–1	1–1	0–1	0–2	1–1	—	0–0	3–0	1–0	4–0	1–1	0–2	0–0	0–0
Europa	1–0	1–0	2–2	1–0	0–1	1–0	2–2	2–1	—	1–3	1–0	1–0	1–0	1–2	3–0	2–1
Lérida	2–0	2–0	1–4	1–1	3–0	3–0	0–0	2–0	1–1	—	0–2	1–1	0–1	2–1	1–1	1–0
Levante	0–1	2–0	1–0	1–0	1–0	4–2	2–0	5–0	1–1	3–3	—	1–0	3–0	1–0	1–0	3–1
Málaga	2–1	1–0	3–0	2–1	1–0	1–0	2–1	5–0	4–0	0–0	1–0	—	1–0	3–0	3–0	2–1
Mallorca	3–1	0–1	1–2	3–0	2–0	4–0	3–1	2–1	0–0	0–0	1–1	0–0	—	4–1	1–3	4–1
Mestalla	0–0	2–0	1–0	2–1	0–2	2–2	7–2	3–2	3–2	4–1	1–1	0–2	1–3	—	4–3	3–1
Murcia	2–1	3–1	1–2	2–0	1–2	3–0	3–2	1–0	0–1	3–0	1–0	1–1	1–0	2–0	—	1–0
Recreativo	1–1	2–0	0–0	5–0	0–0	2–1	2–0	0–0	1–0	1–0	0–1	0–1	0–1	2–0	3–1	—

Source: BDFútbol
Legend: Blue = home team win; Yellow = draw; Red = away team win.

== Promotion playoffs ==
=== First leg ===
28 May 1967	Sevilla	1–0	Real Gijón	Seville
	Lizarralde 14'	Report		Stadium: Ramón Sánchez Pizjuán; Referee: Zariquiegui Izco

18 June 1967	Real Betis	2–0	Granada	Seville
	Rogelio 55'; Quino 72'	Report		Stadium: Benito Villamarín; Referee: Ortiz de Mendibil

=== Second leg ===
4 June 1967	Real Gijón	0–1 (0–2 agg.)	Sevilla	Gijón
		Report	Pintado 5'	Stadium: El Molinón; Referee: Ortiz de Mendibil

25 June 1967	Granada	0–1 (0–3 agg.)	Real Betis	Granada
		Report	Rogelio 50'	Stadium: Los Cármenes; Referee: Pintado Viu

== Relegation playoffs ==
=== First leg ===
18 June 1967	Lugo	1–1	Constancia	Lugo
	Aguirre 82'	Report	Tito 76'	Stadium: Ángel Carro; Referee: García Ibáñez

18 June 1967	Ponferradina	2–2	Langreo	Ponferrada
	Blanco 2'; Jaime 15'	Report	Candi 8'; Oscarín 77'	Stadium: Santa Marta; Referee: García Jaime

18 June 1967	Aragón	1–0	Burgos	Zaragoza
	Planas 42'	Report		Stadium: La Romareda; Referee: Olavarria González

18 June 1967	Real Unión	2–2	Atlético Ceuta	Irun
	Michelena 11', 63'	Report	Ortuño 29'; Rivas 48'	Stadium: Gal; Referee: Rodríguez Barroso

=== Second leg ===
25 June 1967	Constancia	2–0 (3–1 agg.)	Lugo	Inca
	Joseíto 3'; Casañ 58'	Report		Stadium: Nou Camp; Referee: Tomeo Palanques

25 June 1967	Langreo	5–2 (7–4 agg.)	Ponferradina	Langreo
	Oscarín 16', 85'; Peñalver 30'; Nico 61'; Santamaría 75'	Report	Blanco 49'; Isauro 62'	Stadium: Ganzábal; Referee: Moreda Fernández

25 June 1967	Burgos	4–1 (4–2 agg.)	Aragón	Burgos
	Goyarán 5', 81'; Castañón 26'; Mentxaka 57'	Report	Rangil 8'	Stadium: El Plantío; Referee: Orrantia Capelastegui

25 June 1967	Atlético Ceuta	2–0 (4–2 agg.)	Real Unión	Ceuta
	Escudero 52'; Mendi 68'	Report		Stadium: Alfonso Murube; Referee: Ruiz Casasola
