= Dionisio Urreisti =

Spanish footballer and manager

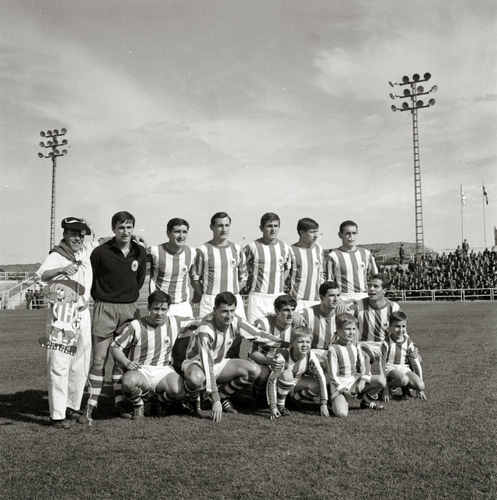
- Real Sociedad lineup in Puertollano.

Personal information
- Full name: Dionisio Urreisti Beristain
- Date of birth: 17 March 1943 (age 83)
- Place of birth: Mutriku, Spain
- Height: 1.68 m (5 ft 6 in)
- Position: Winger

Youth career
- Burumendi
- 1960–1961: Real Sociedad

Senior career*
Years	Team	Apps	(Gls)
1961–1962	San Sebastián	23	(6)
1962–1977	Real Sociedad	349	(61)
Total		372	(67)

Managerial career
- 1978–1979: Eibar
- * Club domestic league appearances and goals

Dionisio Urreisti Beristain (born 17 March 1943) is a Spanish former footballer who played as a right winger, and a current manager.

== Career ==
Urreisti was born in Mutriku, Gipuzkoa, Basque Country, and joined Real Sociedad's youth setup in 1960, aged 17. He was already integrated into the club's reserve team, but had to wait until 1961 to make his debut.

Urreisti appeared in 23 league matches for Sanse during his debut campaign, scoring six goals. In June 1962, he was promoted to the main squad after it was relegated from La Liga.

Urreisti made his first team debut on 16 September 1962, scoring in a 6–1 routing of CD Ourense. After being sparingly used in his first season, he subsequently became an undisputed starter for the side, winning promotion back to the top level in 1967.

Urreisti subsequently became captain of the Txuri-urdin before retiring in 1977, aged 34. After his retirement he worked as a manager, being in charge of SD Eibar for the 1978–79 campaign in the regional leagues.
