= Eusebio Bejarano =

Spanish footballer

Eusebio
Personal information
- Full name: Eusebio Bejarano Vilaro
- Date of birth: 6 May 1948 (age 78)
- Place of birth: Badajoz, Spain
- Position: Defender

Senior career*
Years	Team	Apps	(Gls)
1968–1979	Atlético Madrid	223	(0)

International career
1971	Spain U23	1	(0)
- * Club domestic league appearances and goals

Eusebio Bejarano Vilaro (born 6 May 1948 in Badajoz, Spain) is a former Spanish footballer.

He played for Atlético de Madrid between 1968 and 1979, winning the Spanish League in 1970, 1973, and 1976, the Spanish Cup in 1972 and 1976, and the Intercontinental Cup in 1975. He played in the 1974 European Cup Final, which Atlético lost.

== Honors ==
- Atlético Madrid:
  - Intercontinental Cup: 1974
  - Spanish League: 1969–70, 1972–73, 1976–77
  - Spanish Cup: 1971–72, 1975–76
