= Francisco Melo (footballer) =

Spanish footballer

Personal information
- Full name: Francisco Delgado Melo
- Date of birth: 13 November 1943 (age 82)
- Place of birth: Plasencia, Spain
- Position: Defender

Senior career*
Years	Team	Apps	(Gls)
1964–1968	Valladolid	73	(8)
1968–1976	Atlético Madrid	192	(1)

International career
1970	Spain	2	(0)
- * Club domestic league appearances and goals

Francisco Delgado Melo (born 13 November 1943 in Plasencia, Spain) is a former Spanish footballer.

He played for Atlético de Madrid between 1968 and 1976, winning the Spanish League in 1970 and 1973, and the Intercontinental Cup in 1975. He played in the 1974 European Cup Final, which Atlético lost.
