= Isacio Calleja =

Spanish footballer (1936–2019)

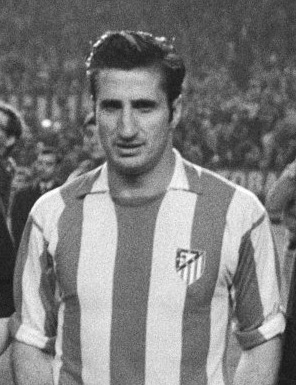
- Calleja in 1971

Personal information
- Full name: Isacio Calleja García
- Date of birth: 6 December 1936
- Place of birth: Valle de Cerrato, Spain
- Date of death: 4 February 2019 (aged 82)
- Place of death: Madrid, Spain
- Height: 1.72 m (5 ft 8 in)
- Position: Defender

Youth career
- Artes Gráficas
- Femsa

Senior career*
Years	Team	Apps	(Gls)
1958–1972	Atlético Madrid	300	(6)
1958	→ Guadalajara (loan)		

International career
1961	Spain B	1	(0)
1961–1972	Spain	13	(0)
Medal record
Representing Spain
European Nations' Cup
Winner	1964 Spain
- * Club domestic league appearances and goals

Isacio Calleja García (6 December 1936 – 4 February 2019) was a Spanish professional footballer who played as a defender.

== Club career ==
Calleja was born in Valle de Cerrato, Province of Palencia. Save for a very brief loan spell with CD Guadalajara in the Tercera División he spent his entire 14-year professional career with Atlético Madrid, making his La Liga debut on 4 January 1959 in a 1–0 away loss against Real Oviedo and finishing his first season with only nine games (albeit all complete).

From there onwards, Calleja became an important defensive member for the Colchoneros, helping the team to back-to-back Copa del Rey trophies from 1959 to 1961, both won against Real Madrid at the Santiago Bernabéu Stadium. In the 1961–62 European Cup Winners' Cup, which also ended in triumph, he contributed nine appearances.

On 19 April 1970, Calleja scored his only goal of the campaign in a 2–0 win at CE Sabadell FC, which granted Atlético the national championship. He retired from football at the end of 1971–72 after winning his fourth Spanish Cup, aged 35; during his spell with his main club, he appeared in 425 official matches (76 in the domestic cup and 45 in European competition).

== International career ==
Calleja was a Spanish international for more than one decade. He made his debut on 19 April 1961, in a 2–1 victory in Wales for the 1962 FIFA World Cup qualifiers.

Calleja helped the national side win the 1964 European Nations' Cup on home soil, playing four matches across the qualifying phase and the finals. In total, he earned 13 caps.

== Post-retirement and death ==
After retiring, Calleja, who majored in law, worked as a solicitor. On 4 February 2019, he died at the age of 82 in Madrid.

== Honours ==
Atlético Madrid

- La Liga: 1965–66, 1969–70
- Copa del Generalísimo: 1959–60, 1960–61, 1964–65, 1971–72
- UEFA Cup Winners' Cup: 1961–62

Spain

- UEFA European Championship: 1964
