= Domingo Benegas =

Paraguayan footballer

Benegas
Personal information
- Full name: Domingo Benegas Jiménez
- Date of birth: 4 August 1946 (age 80)
- Place of birth: Capiatá, Paraguay
- Position: Midfielder

Senior career*
Years	Team	Apps	(Gls)
1968	Libertad		
1969–1970	Atlético Madrid	0	(0)
1970–1971	Mallorca	35	(3)
1971–1972	Burgos	27	(2)
1972–1978	Atlético Madrid	108	(1)
1978–1979	Burgos	8	(0)
- * Club domestic league appearances and goals as of 25 June 2014

Domingo Benegas Jiménez (born 4 August 1946 in Capiatá, Paraguay) is a former Paraguayan footballer.

He played for Atlético de Madrid between 1972 and 1977, winning the Spanish League in 1973 and 1977, the Spanish Cup in 1976, and the Intercontinental Cup in 1975. He played in the 1974 European Cup final, which Atlético .

== Honours ==
Atlético Madrid

- Liga: 1973, 1977
- Copa del Generalísimo: 1975–76
- Intercontinental Cup: 1974
