= José Eulogio Gárate =

Footballer (born 1944)

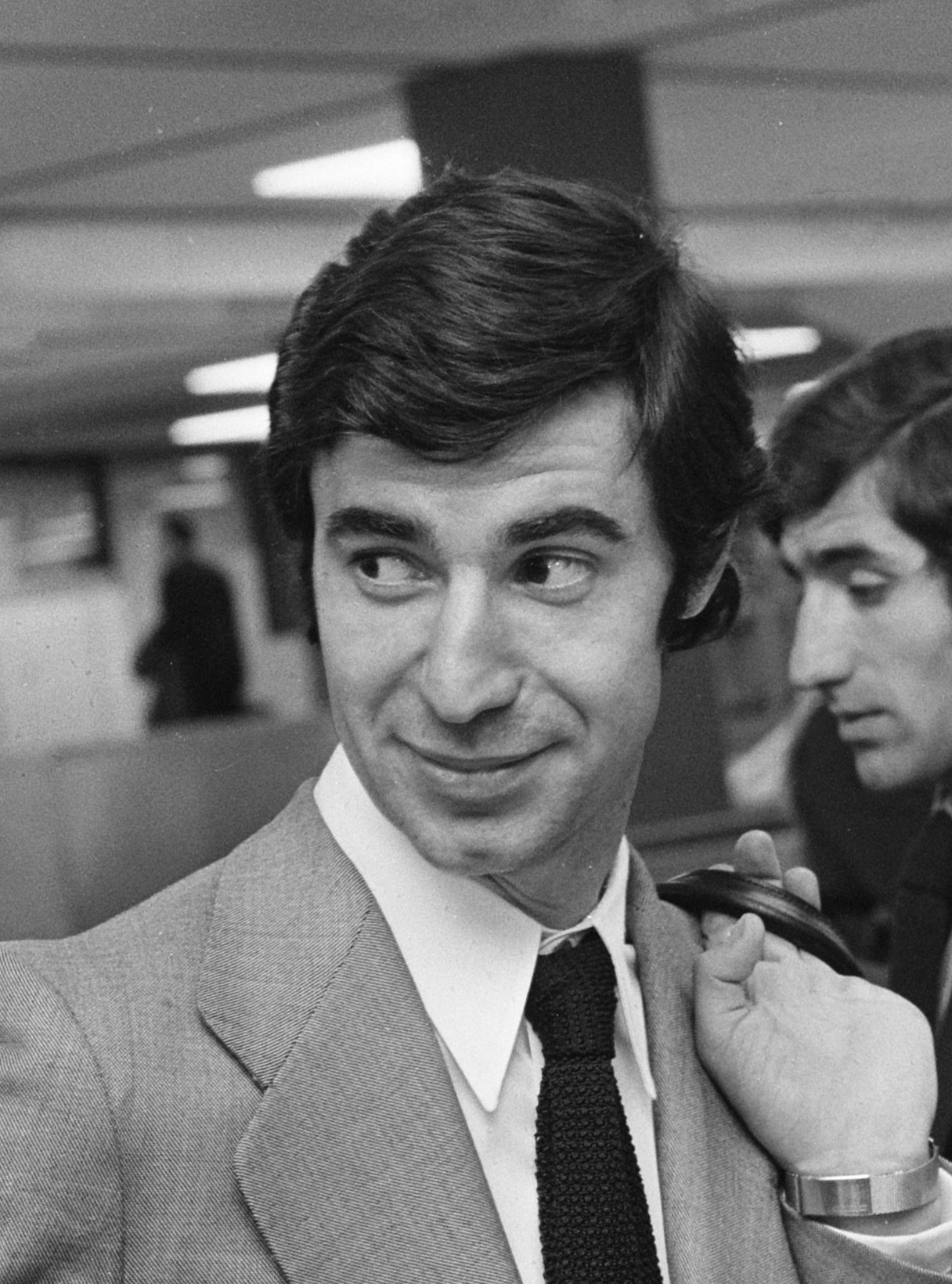
- Gárate in 1973

Personal information
- Full name: José Eulogio Gárate Ormaechea
- Date of birth: 20 September 1944 (age 82)
- Place of birth: Sarandí, Buenos Aires, Argentina
- Position: Striker

Senior career*
Years	Team	Apps	(Gls)
1963–1965	Eibar		
1965–1966	Indautxu	23	(14)
1966–1977	Atlético Madrid	241	(109)

International career
1967	Spain U23	1	(0)
1965	Spain amateur	1	(0)
1967–1975	Spain	18	(5)
- * Club domestic league appearances and goals

José Eulogio Gárate Ormaechea (born 20 September 1944) is a former professional footballer who played as a striker for SD Eibar, SD Indautxu and Atlético Madrid. Born in Argentina, he played for the Spain national team at international level.

== Club career ==
Gárate was born to Basque parents in Argentina and grew up in Eibar, Spain. He began his career with SD Eibar in 1960 before joining SD Indautxu in 1963. Just like two earlier Indautxu players, Chus Pereda and Miguel Jones, he was controversially overlooked by Athletic Bilbao and like Jones he eventually joined Atlético Madrid. Along with Luis Aragonés, Adelardo, Javier Irureta, Enrique Collar, and Ufarte, he was a prominent member of the successful Atlético side of the late 1960s and early 1970s. Gárate helped the team win La Liga three times, the Copa del Generalísimo twice, reach the final of the European Cup and win the Intercontinental Cup. He was a notable goalscorer, winning the Pichichi three consecutive seasons (1968 to 1970) and scoring the winning goals in the 1972 and 1976 Copa del Generalísimo finals. During his time at Atlético, Gárate played 241 games and scored 135 goals.

== International career ==
Gárate also played 18 times for Spain and scored 5 goals. He made his debut on 22 October 1967 against Czechoslovakia and played his last game against Romania on 17 April 1975. During this period Spain failed to qualify for either the European Championships or World Cup, and as a result he never played in the finals of a major international competition.

== Career statistics ==
=== Club ===
Appearances and goals by club, season and competition
Club	Season	League			Copa del Rey		Supercopa de España		Europa		Total	
Club	Season	Division	Apps	Goals	Apps	Goals	Apps	Goals	Apps	Goals	Apps	Goals
Atlético Madrid	1966–67	La Liga	14	9	0	0	–		3	0	17	9
Atlético Madrid	1967–68	La Liga	23	8	6	5	–		3	5	32	18
Atlético Madrid	1968–69	La Liga	20	14	4	1	–		2	0	26	15
Atlético Madrid	1969–70	La Liga	30	16	4	0	–		–		34	16
Atlético Madrid	1970–71	La Liga	28	17	4	3	–		6	2	38	22
Atlético Madrid	1971–72	La Liga	16	5	7	1	–		2	1	25	7
Atlético Madrid	1972–73	La Liga	24	5	2	0	–		0	0	26	5
Atlético Madrid	1973–74	La Liga	29	11	4	1	–		10	2	43	14
Atlético Madrid	1974–75	La Liga	32	17	6	2	–		4	1	42	20
Atlético Madrid	1975–76	La Liga	24	7	9	2	–		3	1	36	10
Atlético Madrid	1976–77	La Liga	1	0	0	0	–		0	0	1	0
Career total			241	109	46	15	0	0	33	12	322	136

=== International ===
Scores and results list Spain's goal tally first, score column indicates score after each Gárate goal.

List of international goals scored by José Eulogio Gárate
No.	Date	Venue	Opponent	Score	Result	Competition
1	22 October 1967	Santiago Bernabéu, Madrid, Spain	Czechoslovakia	2–0	2–1	UEFA Euro 1968 qualifying
2	11 December 1968	Santiago Bernabéu, Madrid, Spain	Belgium	1–1	1–1	1970 FIFA World Cup qualification
3	15 October 1969	José Antonio, La Línea, Spain	Finland	2–0	6–0	1970 FIFA World Cup qualification
4	15 October 1969	José Antonio, La Línea, Spain	Finland	4–0	6–0	1970 FIFA World Cup qualification
5	23 May 1972	Vicente Calderón, Madrid, Spain	Uruguay	2–0	2–0	Friendly

== Honours ==
Atlético Madrid

- Intercontinental Cup: 1974
- Spanish League: 1969–70, 1972–73, 1976–77
- Spanish Cup: 1971–72, 1975–76
- Pichichi Trophy: 1968–69, 1969–70, 1970–71

== See also ==
- List of Spain international footballers born outside Spain
