= Adelardo Rodríguez =

Spanish footballer

Adelardo
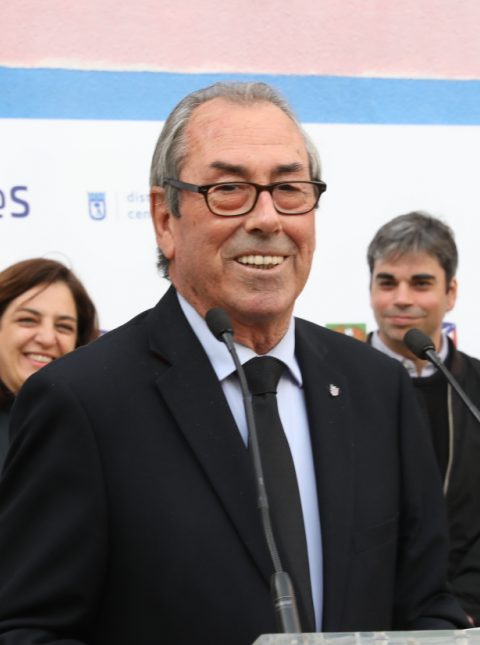
- Adelardo in 2019

Personal information
- Full name: Adelardo Rodríguez Sánchez
- Date of birth: 26 September 1939 (age 87)
- Place of birth: Badajoz, Spain
- Height: 1.71 m (5 ft 7 1/2 in)
- Position: Midfielder

Youth career
- Ferrocarril
- Betis Extremeño
- Extremadura Badajoz

Senior career*
Years	Team	Apps	(Gls)
1957–1959	Badajoz	37	(12)
1959–1976	Atlético Madrid	533	(73)
Total		570	(85)

International career
1960	Spain U21	2	(0)
1961	Spain B	2	(1)
1962–1970	Spain	14	(2)
- * Club domestic league appearances and goals

Adelardo Rodríguez Sánchez, usually referred to simply as Adelardo (born 26 September 1939, in Badajoz), is a Spanish former professional footballer who played as a midfielder.

== Club career ==
Adelardo enjoyed a 17-year spell at Atletico Madrid from 1959 to 1976. He was one of the most accomplished midfield schemers of his generation, combining skill, commitment and an eye for goal.

During his spell, the club won three La Liga titles (65–66, 69–70 and 72–73), five Copa del Reys (1960, 1961, 1965, 1972 and 1976), the 1962 European Cup Winners' Cup, the 1974 Intercontinental Cup.

Adelardo played for Atletico on 553 official appearances, in which he scored 113 goals. He is the second-most capped player in Atlético Madrid history, behind Koke.

== International career ==
He played 14 times for the Spain national football team, scoring 2 goals. He was in the squad of both the 1962 FIFA World Cup and the 1966 FIFA World Cup.

=== International goals ===
#	Date	Venue	Opponent	Score	Result	Competition
1.	6 June 1962	Estadio Sausalito, Viña del Mar, Chile	Brazil	0–1	2–1	1962 FIFA World Cup
2.	13 June 1963	Santiago Bernabéu, Madrid, Spain	Scotland	1–0	2–6	Friendly

== Honours ==
=== Club ===
Atlético Madrid

- Intercontinental Cup: 1974
- UEFA Cup Winners' Cup: 1961–62
- La Liga: 1965–66, 1969–70, 1972–73
- Copa del Rey: 1959–60, 1960–61, 1964–65, 1971–72, 1975–76

Individual

- Patricio Arabolaza Trophy: 1962

== See also ==
- List of Atlético Madrid players (+100)
- List of La Liga players (400+ appearances)
