= Ernesto Domínguez =

Spanish footballer

Personal information
- Full name: Ernesto Domínguez Hernández
- Date of birth: 9 March 1941 (age 85)
- Place of birth: Móra d'Ebre, Spain
- Position: Forward

Youth career
- Gimnástico La Salle
- 1958–1959: Barcelona

Senior career*
Years	Team	Apps	(Gls)
1959–1960	Condal	28	(14)
1960–1962	Español	37	(11)
1962–1966	Levante	97	(27)
1966–1971	Mallorca	123	(52)
Total		285	(104)

International career
1958–1959	Spain U18	4	(4)
1960	Spain B	1	(0)
1963	Spain	1	(0)
- * Club domestic league appearances and goals

Ernesto Domínguez Hernández (born 9 March 1941 in Móra d'Ebre, Tarragona, Catalonia) is a Spanish retired footballer who played as a forward.
