= 1971–72 Copa del Generalísimo =

70th Copa del Rey

Tournament details
- Country: Spain
- Teams: 109

Final positions
- Champions: Atlético Madrid (4th title)
- Runners-up: Valencia CF

Tournament statistics
- Matches played: 205

The 1971–72 Copa del Generalísimo was the 70th staging of the Spanish Cup. The competition began on 24 October 1971 and concluded on 8 July 1972 with the final.

== Third round ==
| Team 1 | Agg. | Team 2 | 1st leg | 2nd leg |
|---|---|---|---|---|
| CD Alcoyano | 3–4 | CD Castellón | 1–0 | 2–4 |
| Real Avilés | 0–4 | Pontevedra CF | 0–0 | 0–4 |
| Club de Futbol Calella | 1–4 | CD Logroñés | 0–1 | 1–3 |
| CD Cartagena | 2–1 | CD Mestalla | 2–1 | 0–0 |
| SD Eibar | 2–3 | UP Langreo | 1–1 | 1–2 |
| CD Getafe | 2–3 | Xerez CD | 1–0 | 1–3 |
| Hércules CF | 4–1 | Calvo Sotelo CF | 4–0 | 0–1 |
| SD Ibiza | 5–8 | Real Valladolid | 3–3 | 2–5 |
| Cultural Leonesa | (a) 3–3 | CD Orense | 1–0 | 2–3 |
| Atlético Malagueño | 2–6 | Rayo Vallecano | 1–1 | 1–5 |
| RCD Mallorca | 3–2 | CD Europa | 1–1 | 2–1 |
| Real Oviedo | 6–4 | SD Huesca | 4–0 | 2–4 |
| Real Santander | 0–1 | Palencia CF | 0–0 | 0–1 |
| Sestao SC | 4–2 | Racing Ferrol | 2–0 | 2–2 |
| Tarrasa CF | 0–1 | Real Zaragoza | 0–0 | 0–1 |
| CD Tenerife | 5–4 | Atlético Madrileño | 5–2 | 0–2 |
| Triana Balompié | 1–2 | Elche CF | 0–1 | 1–1 |
| Villarreal CF | 2–1 | Deportivo Aragón | 1–0 | 1–1 |

Source: RSSSF

- Bye: Cádiz CF and CD San Andrés.

== Fourth round ==
| Team 1 | Agg. | Team 2 | 1st leg | 2nd leg |
|---|---|---|---|---|
| Real Betis | 0–2 | Hércules CF | 0–0 | 0–2 |
| CD Cartagena | 1–0 | Xerez CD | 1–0 | 0–0 |
| CD Castellón | (Note: UP Langreo retired before the matches.) | UP Langreo | | |
| Córdoba CF | 0–2 | Real Valladolid | 0–0 | 0–2 |
| Elche CF | 1–2 | Burgos CF | 1–1 | 0–1 |
| Granada CF | 6–4 | CD Tenerife | 4–0 | 2–4 |
| CD Logroñés | 2–1 | Deportivo La Coruña | 1–0 | 1–1 |
| RCD Mallorca | 0–3 | Cultural Leonesa | 0–2 | 0–1 |
| Real Oviedo | 0–2 | RCD Español | 0–1 | 0–1 |
| Palencia CF | (a) 2–2 | Cádiz CF | 1–0 | 1–2 |
| Pontevedra CF | 2–1 | CD Sabadell CF | 0–1 | 2–0 |
| Rayo Vallecano | 1–5 | Sporting de Gijón | 1–0 | 0–5 |
| CD San Andrés | 4–3 | Villarreal CF | 2–1 | 2–2 |
| Sestao SC | 4–6 | UD Las Palmas | 2–0 | 2–6 |
| Real Zaragoza | 1–2 | CD Málaga | 1–1 | 0–1 |

Source: RSSSF

== Fifth round ==
| Team 1 | Agg. | Team 2 | 1st leg | 2nd leg |
|---|---|---|---|---|
| Burgos CF | 0–7 | RCD Español | 0–2 | 0–5 |
| CD Cartagena | (a) 5–5 | Cultural Leonesa | 3–1 | 2–4 |
| Granada CF | 5–1 | Palencia CF | 4–0 | 1–1 |
| Hércules CF | 1–2 | CD Castellón | 1–0 | 0–2 |
| CD San Andrés | 2–1 | CD Logroñés | 2–1 | 0–0 |
| Sporting Gijón | 5–3 | CD Málaga | 3–0 | 2–3 |
| Real Valladolid | 3–3 (a) | Pontevedra CF | 3–1 | 0–2 |

Source: RSSSF

- Bye: UD Las Palmas

== Round of 16 ==
| Team 1 | Agg. | Team 2 | 1st leg | 2nd leg |
|---|---|---|---|---|
| Club Atlético de Bilbao | 6–2 | CD Cartagena | 5–2 | 1–0 |
| Atlético Madrid | 1–0 | UD Las Palmas | 1–0 | 0–0 |
| CD Castellón | 1–2 | CF Barcelona | 0–0 | 1–2 |
| Celta Vigo | 3–1 | Pontevedra CF | 3–1 | 0–0 |
| RCD Español | 6–4 | Sevilla CF | 3–1 | 3–3 |
| Granada CF | 2–3 | Valencia CF | 0–1 | 2–2 |
| CD San Andrés | 2–6 | Real Madrid | 1–1 | 1–5 |
| Sporting Gijón | 1–3 | Real Sociedad | 0–0 | 1–3 |

Source: RSSSF

== Quarter-finals ==
| Team 1 | Agg. | Team 2 | 1st leg | 2nd leg |
|---|---|---|---|---|
| CF Barcelona | 0–3 | Atlético Madrid | 0–2 | 0–1 |
| Real Madrid | 4–3 | RCD Español | 3–0 | 1–3 |
| Real Sociedad | 1–3 | Club Atlético de Bilbao | 1–1 | 0–2 |
| Valencia CF | 2–0 | Celta Vigo | 1–0 | 1–0 |

Source: RSSSF

== Semi-finals ==
| Team 1 | Agg. | Team 2 | 1st leg | 2nd leg |
|---|---|---|---|---|
| Club Atlético de Madrid | 5–4 | Club Atlético de Bilbao | 4–1 | 1–3 |
| Valencia CF | 1–0 | Real Madrid CF | 1–0 | 0–0 |

Source: RSSSF

== Final ==
| Team 1 | Score | Team 2 |
|---|---|---|
| Club Atlético de Madrid | 2–1 | Valencia CF |

Copa del Generalísimo
winners
Atlético Madrid
4th title
