= 1969–70 La Liga =

39th season of La Liga

Primera División
- Season: 1969–70
- Champions: Atlético Madrid (6th title)
- Relegated: Deportivo La Coruña; Mallorca; Pontevedra
- European Cup: Atlético Madrid
- Cup Winners' Cup: Real Madrid
- Matches: 240
- Goals: 567 (2.36 per match)
- Top goalscorer: Amancio; Luis Aragonés; José Eulogio Gárate (16 goals each)
- Highest scoring: Mallorca 4–6 Granada

The 1969–70 La Liga was the 39th season since its establishment. The season began on 13 September 1969, and concluded on 19 April 1970.

== Team locations ==
Location of teams in 1969–70 La Liga
Canary Islands

Team	Home city	Stadium
Atlético Bilbao	Bilbao	San Mamés
Atlético Madrid	Madrid	Vicente Calderón
Barcelona	Barcelona	Nou Camp
Celta	Vigo	Balaídos
Deportivo La Coruña	A Coruña	Riazor
Elche	Elche	Altabix
Granada	Granada	Los Cármenes
Las Palmas	Las Palmas	Insular
Mallorca	Palma	Lluís Sitjar
Pontevedra	Pontevedra	Pasarón
Real Madrid	Madrid	Santiago Bernabéu
Real Sociedad	San Sebastián	Atocha
Sabadell	Sabadell	Creu Alta
Sevilla	Seville	Ramón Sánchez Pizjuán
Valencia	Valencia	Luis Casanova
Zaragoza	Zaragoza	La Romareda

== League table ==
Pos	Team	Pld	W	D	L	GF	GA	GD	Pts	Qualification or relegation
1	Atlético Madrid (C)	30	18	6	6	53	22	+31	42	Qualification for the European Cup first round
2	Atlético Bilbao	30	17	7	6	44	20	+24	41	Invited for the Inter-Cities Fairs Cup
3	Sevilla	30	14	7	9	39	32	+7	35	Invited for the Inter-Cities Fairs Cup
4	Barcelona	30	13	9	8	40	31	+9	35	Invited for the Inter-Cities Fairs Cup
5	Valencia	30	15	5	10	35	23	+12	35	Invited for the Inter-Cities Fairs Cup
6	Real Madrid	30	13	9	8	50	42	+8	35	Qualification for the Cup Winners' Cup first round (Note: Real Madrid qualified to the Cup Winners' Cup as champions of the Copa del Generalísimo.)
7	Real Sociedad	30	15	3	12	47	37	+10	33	
8	Zaragoza	30	13	7	10	35	39	−4	33	
9	Las Palmas	30	10	7	13	32	40	−8	27	
10	Celta Vigo	30	10	7	13	31	39	−8	27	
11	Elche	30	8	10	12	32	44	−12	26	
12	Granada	30	8	10	12	20	31	−11	26	
13	Sabadell	30	10	5	15	31	37	−6	25	
14	Deportivo La Coruña (R)	30	8	9	13	25	32	−7	25	Relegation to the Segunda División
15	Mallorca (R)	30	7	8	15	33	52	−19	22	Relegation to the Segunda División
16	Pontevedra (R)	30	4	5	21	20	46	−26	13	Relegation to the Segunda División

Source: BDFútbol
Rules for classification: 1) Points; 2) Head-to-head results; 3) Goal difference; 4) Number of goals scored
(C) Champions; (R) Relegated

== Results ==
Home \ Away	ATB	ATM	BAR	CEL	DEP	ELC	GRA	LPA	MLL	PON	RMA	RSO	SAB	SEV	VAL	ZAR
Atlético Bilbao	—	2–0	1–1	1–0	1–0	2–0	1–0	3–0	2–0	3–1	5–0	1–0	1–0	0–1	0–0	2–0
Atlético Madrid	2–1	—	1–1	4–0	2–0	4–1	5–0	1–2	3–1	2–0	3–0	4–0	0–1	1–0	2–0	2–0
CF Barcelona	3–2	1–2	—	2–1	1–0	1–1	1–0	0–0	5–1	2–0	1–0	2–1	3–1	1–0	1–0	4–2
Celta	0–2	1–1	1–2	—	2–2	4–0	2–1	1–0	3–1	1–0	2–2	2–0	1–1	1–1	1–0	1–0
Deportivo de La Coruña	1–1	0–1	0–0	0–1	—	1–0	3–0	0–0	1–1	2–1	1–1	0–2	1–1	3–0	2–1	0–1
Elche CF	0–1	1–1	1–0	3–1	1–0	—	1–0	1–2	1–1	1–0	0–2	4–2	1–1	5–0	0–0	1–1
Granada CF	0–0	0–0	0–0	1–0	2–0	0–0	—	0–0	1–1	1–0	0–0	0–3	2–1	0–0	0–1	1–0
UD Las Palmas	1–3	2–2	1–0	3–0	0–1	5–1	1–2	—	3–1	1–1	2–4	0–1	1–0	3–0	0–2	2–0
RCD Mallorca	2–2	1–0	3–2	0–0	0–1	0–0	4–6	1–0	—	3–0	1–2	3–2	1–0	1–2	0–3	1–1
Pontevedra CF	0–2	1–2	0–0	0–2	0–0	1–1	0–1	0–0	0–2	—	1–3	1–0	2–1	3–2	0–1	0–1
Real Madrid	2–2	1–1	3–3	3–1	2–2	3–1	2–0	5–0	1–1	2–1	—	3–0	1–0	2–3	2–1	2–2
Real Sociedad	2–0	2–1	1–0	2–1	2–1	3–0	2–1	5–0	2–0	2–1	1–2	—	2–1	0–0	1–2	5–0
CE Sabadell FC	1–2	0–2	3–2	3–1	1–0	1–2	2–1	1–0	1–0	1–4	3–0	1–1	—	2–1	2–0	1–1
Sevilla CF	1–0	0–1	3–0	3–0	2–0	2–2	0–0	1–1	3–1	3–1	1–0	1–1	2–0	—	4–2	2–0
Valencia CF	1–0	2–3	0–0	0–0	0–1	2–0	1–0	2–0	3–0	2–0	1–0	3–1	1–0	0–1	—	3–1
Zaragoza	1–1	1–0	2–1	1–0	5–2	3–2	0–0	1–2	2–1	2–1	2–0	2–1	1–0	1–0	1–1	—

Source: BDFútbol
Legend: Blue = home team win; Yellow = draw; Red = away team win.

== Pichichi Trophy ==
Rank	Player	Club	Goals
1	(Spain) Amancio	Real Madrid	16
1	(Spain) Luis Aragonés	Atlético Madrid	16
1	(Spain) José Eulogio Gárate	Atlético Madrid	16
4	(Spain) Ernesto Domínguez	Mallorca	13
5	(Paraguay) Bernardo Acosta	Sevilla	12
5	(Paraguay) Sebastián Fleitas	Real Madrid	12
