= 1972–73 La Liga =

42nd season of La Liga

Primera División
- Season: 1972–73
- Champions: Atlético Madrid (7th title)
- Relegated: Real Betis; Deportivo La Coruña; Burgos
- European Cup: Atlético Madrid
- Cup Winners' Cup: Athletic Bilbao
- UEFA Cup: Barcelona; Español; Real Madrid
- Matches: 306
- Goals: 656 (2.14 per match)
- Top goalscorer: Marianín (19 goals)
- Biggest home win: Real Madrid 6–1 Real Sociedad; Zaragoza 5–0 Deportivo La Coruña
- Biggest away win: Castellón 1–4 Athletic Bilbao
- Highest scoring: Real Madrid 6–1 Real Sociedad

The 1972–73 La Liga was the 42nd season since its establishment. It began on 2 September 1972, and concluded on 20 May 1973.

== Team locations ==
Location of teams in La Liga 1972–73
Canary Islands

Team	Home city	Stadium
Athletic Bilbao	Bilbao	San Mamés
Atlético Madrid	Madrid	Vicente Calderón
Barcelona	Barcelona	Nou Camp
Burgos	Burgos	El Plantío
Castellón	Castellón de la Plana	Castalia
Celta	Vigo	Balaídos
Deportivo La Coruña	A Coruña	Riazor
Español	Barcelona	Sarriá
Granada	Granada	Los Cármenes
Las Palmas	Las Palmas	Insular
Málaga	Málaga	La Rosaleda
Real Oviedo	Oviedo	Carlos Tartiere
Real Betis	Seville	Benito Villamarín
Real Madrid	Madrid	Santiago Bernabéu
Real Sociedad	San Sebastián	Atocha
Sporting Gijón	Gijón	El Molinón
Valencia	Valencia	Luis Casanova
Zaragoza	Zaragoza	La Romareda

== League table ==
Pos	Team	Pld	W	D	L	GF	GA	GD	Pts	Qualification or relegation
1	Atlético Madrid (C)	34	20	8	6	49	29	+20	48	Qualification for the European Cup first round
2	Barcelona	34	18	10	6	41	21	+20	46	Qualification for the UEFA Cup first round
3	Español	34	17	11	6	48	27	+21	45	Qualification for the UEFA Cup first round
4	Real Madrid	34	17	9	8	45	29	+16	43	Qualification for the UEFA Cup first round
5	Castellón	34	13	9	12	44	38	+6	35	
6	Valencia	34	12	10	12	37	33	+4	34	
7	Real Sociedad	34	13	8	13	37	39	−2	34	
8	Zaragoza	34	10	14	10	36	36	0	34	
9	Athletic Bilbao	34	12	9	13	41	38	+3	33	Qualification for the Cup Winners' Cup first round (Note: Athletic Bilbao qualified to the Cup Winners' Cup as champions of the Copa del Generalísimo.)
10	Málaga	34	11	11	12	33	29	+4	33	
11	Las Palmas	34	11	9	14	38	44	−6	31	
12	Oviedo	34	9	12	13	33	44	−11	30	
13	Granada	34	9	11	14	25	32	−7	29	
14	Sporting Gijón	34	11	7	16	32	37	−5	29	
15	Celta Vigo	34	10	9	15	30	37	−7	29	
16	Real Betis (R)	34	7	14	13	29	36	−7	28	Relegation to the Segunda División
17	Deportivo La Coruña (R)	34	7	13	14	22	44	−22	27	Relegation to the Segunda División
18	Burgos (R)	34	9	6	19	36	63	−27	24	Relegation to the Segunda División

Source: BDFútbol
Rules for classification: 1) Points; 2) Head-to-head results; 3) Goal difference; 4) Number of goals scored
(C) Champions; (R) Relegated

== Results table ==
Home \ Away	ATB	ATM	BAR	BET	BUR	CAS	CEL	DEP	ESP	GRA	LPA	MLG	RGI	RMA	ROV	RSO	VAL	ZAR
Atlético Bilbao		1–0	0–1	1–1	4–0	1–1	1–1	3–0	1–0	0–1	1–0	2–0	2–0	2–1	3–3	2–1	2–0	1–0
Atlético Madrid	2–1		2–0	2–1	4–2	1–0	5–1	3–1	0–0	2–1	2–1	1–1	0–1	1–2	2–1	2–1	1–3	0–0
CF Barcelona	1–0	0–0		2–0	2–0	3–1	2–0	3–1	0–1	3–0	3–1	0–0	3–1	1–0	3–1	1–0	0–0	1–1
Betis	0–0	1–0	0–2		5–1	2–0	1–0	2–0	2–2	0–0	0–2	0–1	2–0	2–1	0–0	1–1	0–0	1–1
Burgos	5–1	0–1	0–0	2–1		2–1	0–0	0–0	1–1	2–1	3–3	2–2	2–1	2–3	0–1	1–0	2–1	3–0
CD Castellón	1–4	1–1	4–0	3–1	3–1		5–1	2–0	2–0	0–0	2–1	1–0	1–0	2–3	2–0	3–0	1–3	1–1
Celta de Vigo	1–0	0–1	0–0	0–0	1–0	2–0		1–0	1–1	0–0	3–1	1–0	3–0	3–0	4–2	0–1	1–0	1–2
Deportivo de La Coruña	2–1	1–1	0–1	2–0	2–1	1–1	1–0		0–0	0–0	2–2	1–0	2–1	0–0	1–1	1–2	1–1	0–0
RCD Español	0–0	2–1	1–1	2–2	2–0	1–0	4–2	2–1		2–1	4–0	1–0	3–0	1–0	3–0	1–1	3–0	3–1
Granada CF	0–0	0–1	0–2	0–0	2–0	1–1	1–0	2–0	2–2		1–0	2–0	1–0	1–2	4–0	2–0	1–1	0–0
UD Las Palmas	1–0	2–2	2–1	2–0	4–1	0–1	0–0	3–0	0–2	1–0		1–3	1–1	1–1	2–1	1–0	1–0	1–1
CD Málaga	0–0	0–1	2–1	0–0	3–0	1–1	1–0	4–1	0–1	3–0	0–1		1–0	1–0	1–1	3–0	1–1	2–1
Real Gijón	2–0	2–3	1–1	1–0	1–2	1–0	3–1	0–0	0–0	2–0	2–2	2–0		1–0	1–0	3–0	1–1	3–0
Real Madrid	3–3	0–1	0–0	1–1	2–0	2–0	1–0	0–0	1–0	2–1	2–1	2–0	1–0		3–0	6–1	2–1	0–0
Real Oviedo	2–1	0–2	0–0	0–0	1–0	0–0	0–0	0–0	1–2	3–0	3–0	0–0	1–0	1–2		1–1	3–1	2–0
Real Sociedad	1–0	0–1	2–0	2–1	5–1	0–0	1–0	2–0	4–1	1–0	1–0	1–1	0–0	1–1	1–2		2–1	3–0
Valencia CF	4–1	1–2	0–1	2–0	3–0	4–2	1–0	0–1	1–0	0–0	0–0	2–1	1–0	0–1	2–2	1–0		0–0
Zaragoza	3–2	1–1	0–2	3–2	2–0	0–1	2–2	5–0	1–0	2–0	1–0	1–1	3–1	0–0	3–0	1–1	0–1	

Legend: Blue = home team win; Yellow = draw; Red = away team win.

== Pichichi Trophy ==
Rank	Player	Club	Goals
1	(Spain) Marianín	Oviedo	19
2	(Spain) Luis Aragonés	Atlético Madrid	16
3	(Argentina) (Spain) Roberto Martínez	Español	14
4	(Spain) Germán Dévora	Las Palmas	13
4	(Spain) Juan María Amiano	Español	13
