= 1961 Copa del Generalísimo final =

Copa del Generalísimo 1961 final
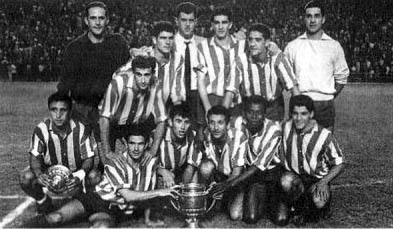
- Players of Atlético Madrid posing with the cup
- Event: 1960–61 Copa del Generalísimo
Atlético Madrid	Real Madrid
3	2
- Date: 2 July 1961
- Venue: Santiago Bernabéu, Madrid
- Referee: Vicente Lloris
- Attendance: 120,000

The Copa del Generalísimo 1961 final was the 59th final of the King's Cup. The final was played at Santiago Bernabéu Stadium in Madrid, on 2 July 1961, being won by Club Atlético de Madrid, who beat Real Madrid 3–2. The final was a rematch of the previous year's title game, which was also won by Atlético.

== Match details ==
2 July 1961
20:30 CET

Atlético Madrid	3–2	Real Madrid
Peiró 20', 46'; Mendonça 69'	Report	Puskás 9'; Di Stéfano 82'

Santiago Bernabéu, Madrid
Attendance: 120,000
Referee: Vicente Llopis

Atlético Madrid

Real Madrid

GK	1	(Argentina) Edgardo Madinabeytia
DF	2	(Spain) Feliciano Rivilla
DF	3	(Argentina) Jorge Griffa
DF	4	(Spain) Isacio Calleja
MF	5	(Brazil) Ramiro
MF	6	(Spain) Alberto Callejo
FW	7	(Spain) Miguel Jones
FW	8	(Spain) Adelardo Rodríguez
FW	9	(Portugal) Jorge Alberto Mendonça
FW	10	(Spain) Joaquín Peiró
FW	11	(Spain) Enrique Collar (c)
Manager:
(Spain) José Villalonga

GK	1	(Spain) José Vicente Train
DF	2	(Spain) Marquitos
DF	3	(Uruguay) José Emilio Santamaría
DF	4	(Spain) Pedro Casado
MF	5	(Spain) José María Vidal
MF	6	(Spain) Pachín
FW	7	(Spain) Enrique Mateos
FW	8	(Spain) Luis del Sol
FW	9	(Argentina) Alfredo Di Stéfano
FW	10	(Hungary) Ferenc Puskás
FW	11	(Spain) Francisco Gento (c)
Manager:
(Spain) Miguel Muñoz

== See also ==
- Madrid derby
