= Madrid derby =

Club football rivalry in Madrid, Spain

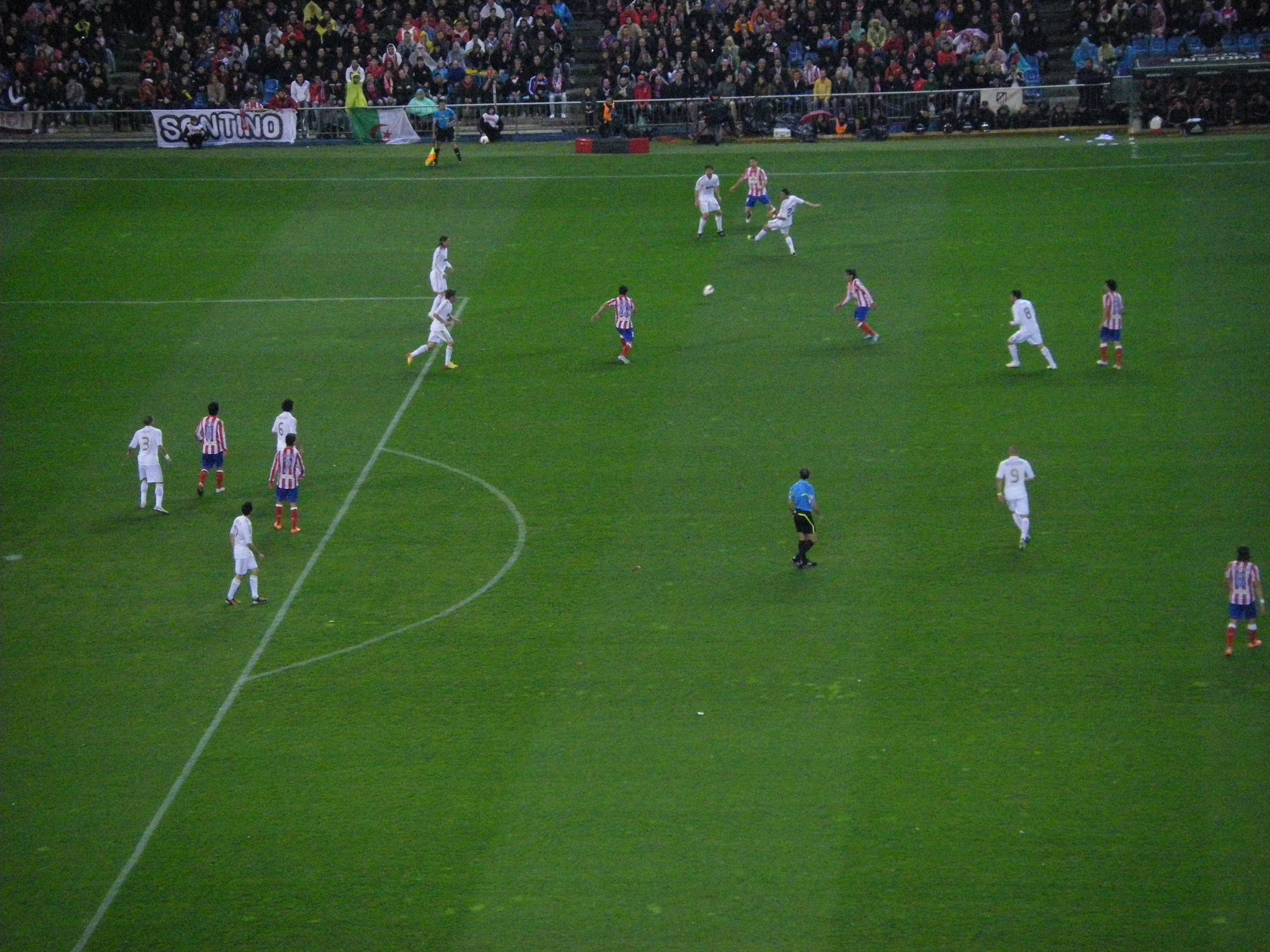
- A 2012 Madrid derby
- Native name: El Derbi Madrileño
- Location: Madrid, Spain
- Teams: Atlético Madrid; Real Madrid
- First meeting: 2 December 1906; Campeonato Regional Centro; Atlético Madrid 1–2 Real Madrid
- Latest meeting: 20 September 2026; La Liga; Atlético Madrid 2–1 Real Madrid
- Next meeting: 4 April 2027; La Liga; Real Madrid v Atlético Madrid
- Stadiums: Metropolitano (Atlético Madrid); Bernabéu (Real Madrid)

Statistics
- Total meetings: 244
- Most wins: Real Madrid (119)
- Most player appearances: Koke (45)
- Top scorer: Cristiano Ronaldo (22)
- Largest victory: Atlético Madrid 5–0 Real Madrid; 1947–48 La Liga (23 November 1947); Real Madrid 5–0 Atlético Madrid; 1958–59 La Liga (2 November 1958); Real Madrid 5–0 Atlético Madrid; 1983–84 La Liga (29 October 1983)
- Largest goal scoring: Real Madrid 3–7 Atlético Madrid; International Champions Cup (26 July 2019)
- Location of the teams' stadia and training bases in Madrid

The Madrid derby (Spanish: El Derbi Madrileño) is the name given to football matches between Atlético Madrid and Real Madrid, both hailing from the Spanish capital city of Madrid. Originally it referred only to those fixtures held in the Spanish championship, but nowadays the term has been generalized, and tends to include every single match between the two clubs, such as in tournaments like the UEFA Champions League, Copa del Rey and Supercopa de España.

The two clubs met in Lisbon for the 2014 UEFA Champions League final, making it the first time two clubs from the same city played in the final. After facing off a second time in the 2016 UEFA Champions League final in Milan, with Real Madrid winning as they had two years earlier, they also met in the 2018 UEFA Super Cup, again the first time two clubs from the same city met in that event; it was won by Atlético.

== History ==
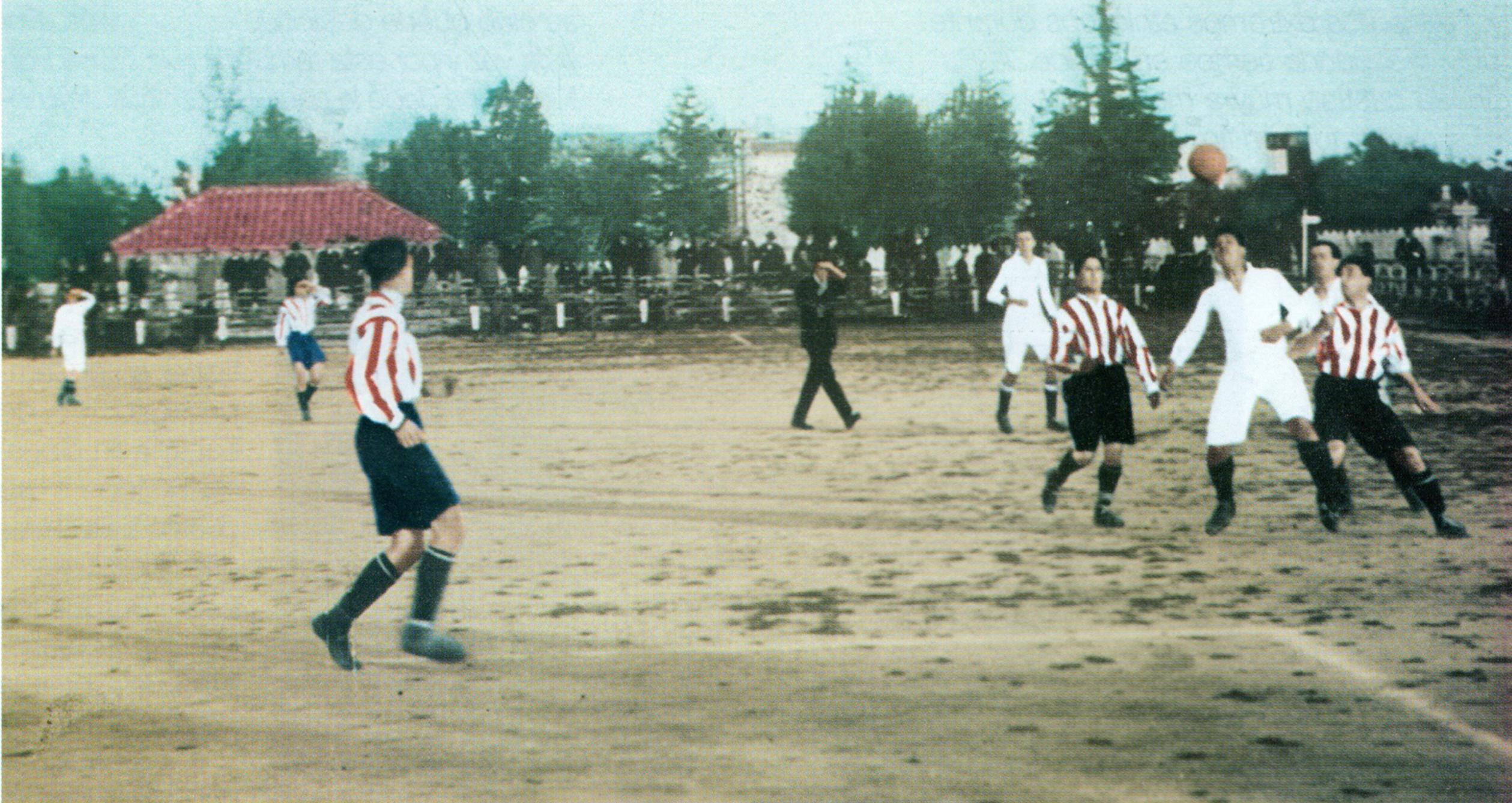
A Madrid derby in 1919

The rivalry between the two clubs started at the very beginning of the twentieth century. Madrid Foot-Ball Club (founded 1902), the most powerful club in the Spanish capital, kept on making mergers and acquisitions of the best smaller clubs in the city, which subsequently disappeared. At the same time, Madrid FC also signed the best players from the clubs it did not absorb, which also made those clubs defunct when they were unable to compete against the Whites. The main exception to this pattern was Athletic Club Madrid (founded 1903), who were able to keep most of their best players thanks to the financial aid of their "parent", Athletic Club Bilbao, and so became the last stand against the Madrid FC supremacy in the capital. Many supporters of the clubs that had vanished due to the Real (a recognition given by the King of Spain to his favoured clubs, bestowed upon Madrid FC in 1920, rescinded by the Second Spanish Republic in 1931 and then restored by General Francisco Franco in 1940) therefore became supporters of the Red-and-whites, many harbouring dislike towards the "royal" club and triggering the rivalry. However, in terms of competitive honours won, Real Madrid were far above Athletic Madrid (who remained so named even after their separation from the original Basque club) until after the Spanish Civil War.

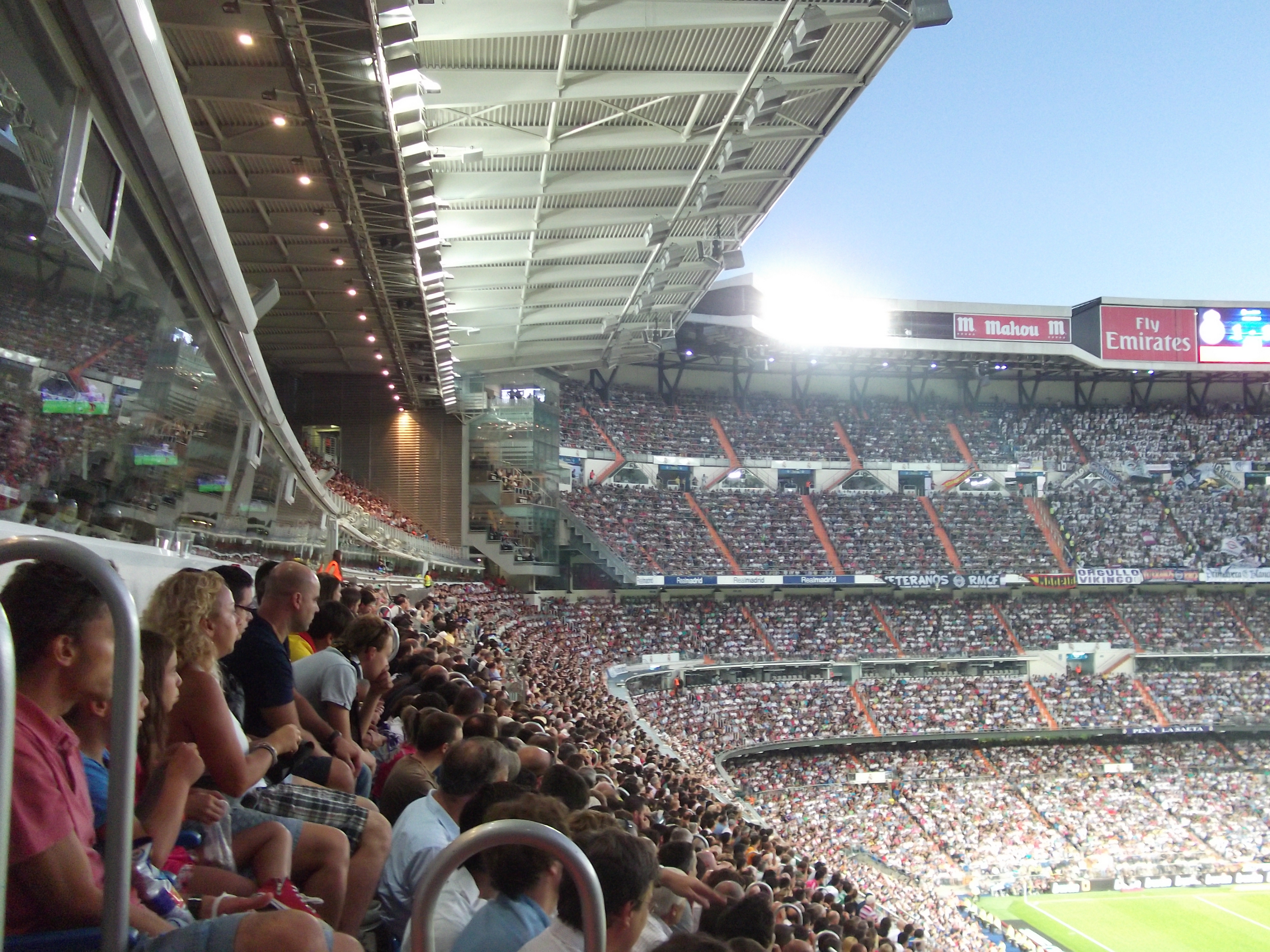
Bernabéu Stadium during Real Madrid vs Atlético in September 2014

After the war, during the early Francoist period, Atlético became associated with the military air force (and thus renamed Atlético Aviación), although the alleged preference of the regime for the club is subject to discussion, as after winning their very first league title in 1940, Atlético's coach Ricardo Zamora was jailed on charges of being a communist. In any case, during this period Atlético became the most successful club in Spain, reducing the historical gap between the two clubs, until the regime preference shifted towards Real Madrid in the 1950s, as Franco sought to make political capital out of Real Madrid's multiple European Cup titles at a time when Spain was internationally isolated; one minister said, "Real Madrid are the best ambassadors we've ever had." Thus, Atlético fans regularly chanted that Real were "El equipo del gobierno, la vergüenza del país" – "The team of the government, the shame of the country" – and allegedly adopted a more left-wing slant (tempered by the rise of ultras culture, and Rayo Vallecano's presence as the "true" leftist club in Madrid).

The rivalry first gained international attention in 1959 during the European Cup when the two clubs met in the semi-finals. Real won the first leg 2–1 at the Bernabéu, while Atlético won 1–0 at the Metropolitano. The tie went to a replay, which Real won 2–1. Atlético, however, gained some revenge when, led by former Real Madrid coach José Villalonga, it defeated its city rivals in two successive Copa del Generalísimo finals in 1960 and 1961. In the 1970s, Atlético took again the lead as the most successful Spanish club of the decade, which prompted the Real Madrid fanbase to look down on Atlético, calling them and their supporters "Indios" (Indians, a reference to the Latin American players signed by the Red-and-whites). It is worth noting that by then, Real Madrid was not very keen on signing non-Caucasian players (president Santiago Bernabéu even stated, when he decided not to sign Portuguese star Eusebio at the end of the 1960s, "Mientras yo viva, aquí no jugará ningún negro ni un blanco con bigote" ("As long as I live, no black or white with a mustache will play here"). Atlético's supporters accepted the new "Indian" nickname joyfully and have been using it until today.

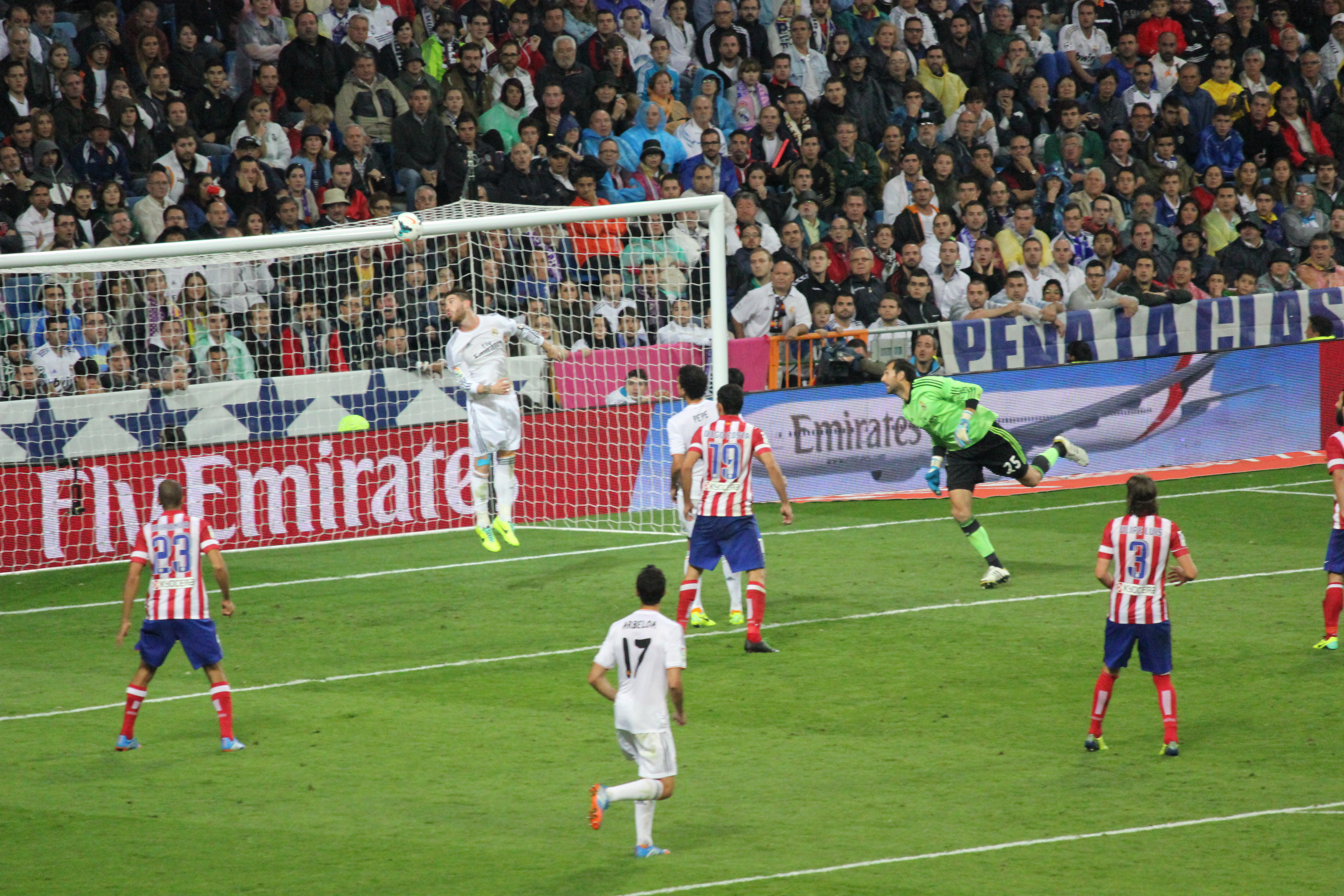
Real Madrid against Atlético Madrid in September 2013

The Santiago Bernabéu, Real Madrid's stadium named after its former president, is alongside banks and businesses on the upper class Paseo de la Castellana street, while the Vicente Calderón (the stadium that Atlético Madrid used until the 2016–17 season) could be found near a brewery, alongside the Manzanares River and a motorway. Real draw greater support all across the region because of their historically greater resources and success, while Atlético have a relatively working-class fan base mainly from the south of the city, with some fans also scattered throughout the city. In fact, the Atlético crest includes the Coat of arms of Madrid, whereas Real crest has no such a reference to the city (instead, it includes a reference to the broader Castile region).

Between 1961 and 1989, when Real dominated La Liga, only Atlético offered it any serious challenge, winning league titles in 1966, 1970, 1973 and 1977. In 1965, Atlético became the first team to beat Real at the Bernabéu in eight years. In the modern era, the Madrid derby is the second biggest derby in Spanish football, behind El Clásico, and although Real Madrid have the larger worldwide fanbase, Atlético Madrid have also amassed a significant worldwide fanbase, due to their level of success in the Champions League and Europa League in the early 21st century. Real Madrid is the most successful club in the Champions League, having won it 15 times. Atlético have never won the Champions League, though they have reached the final on three occasions (losing narrowly to Real Madrid in two of those), and they have also won the Europa League three times since 2010 (compared to two UEFA Cups for Real Madrid in the 1980s) and the UEFA Super Cup three times (one of them against Real Madrid).

On 27 July 2019, Real Madrid and Atlético Madrid faced off in an off-season exhibition match at the 2019 International Champions Cup in the United States, marking the first time the two clubs faced off in a Madrid derby held outside their home country. It wound up setting a record for the highest-scoring Madrid derby, and a blowout win for Atlético Madrid, as they routed Real Madrid 7–3; Atlético Madrid led 5–0 at half time, and Real Madrid only began to rally from behind in the second half of the match.

== All matches ==
As of 20 September 2026

Competition	Matches	Real Madrid wins	Draws	Atlético Madrid wins	Real Madrid goals	Atlético Madrid goals
League	179	92	44	43	308	235
Cup	44	18	14	12	62	50
League Cup	4	1	1	2	7	7
Spanish Super Cup	5	2	2	1	8	6
UEFA Champions League	11	6	2	3	16	9
UEFA Super Cup	1	0	0	1	2	4
Total matches	244	119	63	62	403	311

== Primera División matches ==
Real Madrid wins	92
Draws	44
Atlético Madrid wins	43
Real Madrid goals	308
Atlético Madrid goals	235
Total matches	178

Season	Home team	Score	Away team
1928–29	Real Madrid	2–1	Atlético Madrid
1928–29	Atlético Madrid	0–3	Real Madrid
1929–30	Real Madrid	4–1	Atlético Madrid
1929–30	Atlético Madrid	2–1	Real Madrid
1930–31	Atlético Madrid in Spanish Second Division		
1931–32	Atlético Madrid in Spanish Second Division		
1932–33	Atlético Madrid in Spanish Second Division		
1933–34	Atlético Madrid in Spanish Second Division		
1934–35	Real Madrid	2–0	Atlético Madrid
1934–35	Atlético Madrid	2–2	Real Madrid
1935–36	Real Madrid	3–1	Atlético Madrid
1935–36	Atlético Madrid	2–3	Real Madrid
1936–37	Spanish Civil War		
1937–38	Spanish Civil War		
1938–39	Spanish Civil War		
1939–40	Real Madrid	2–0	Atlético Madrid
1939–40	Atlético Madrid	2–1	Real Madrid
1940–41	Real Madrid	1–3	Atlético Madrid
1940–41	Atlético Madrid	4–1	Real Madrid
1941–42	Real Madrid	4–1	Atlético Madrid
1941–42	Atlético Madrid	2–0	Real Madrid
1942–43	Real Madrid	1–3	Atlético Madrid
1942–43	Atlético Madrid	2–1	Real Madrid
1943–44	Real Madrid	3–2	Atlético Madrid
1943–44	Atlético Madrid	3–1	Real Madrid
1944–45	Real Madrid	3–1	Atlético Madrid
1944–45	Atlético Madrid	0–1	Real Madrid
1945–46	Real Madrid	2–1	Atlético Madrid
1945–46	Atlético Madrid	3–1	Real Madrid
1946–47	Real Madrid	1–2	Atlético Madrid
1946–47	Atlético Madrid	2–3	Real Madrid
1947–48	Real Madrid	1–1	Atlético Madrid
1947–48	Atlético Madrid	5–0	Real Madrid
1948–49	Real Madrid	1–2	Atlético Madrid
1948–49	Atlético Madrid	0–2	Real Madrid
1949–50	Real Madrid	4–2	Atlético Madrid
1949–50	Atlético Madrid	5–1	Real Madrid
1950–51	Real Madrid	3–6	Atlético Madrid
1950–51	Atlético Madrid	4–0	Real Madrid
1951–52	Real Madrid	2–1	Atlético Madrid
1951–52	Atlético Madrid	3–2	Real Madrid
1952–53	Real Madrid	2–0	Atlético Madrid
1952–53	Atlético Madrid	1–2	Real Madrid
1953–54	Real Madrid	2–1	Atlético Madrid
1953–54	Atlético Madrid	3–4	Real Madrid
1954–55	Real Madrid	1–0	Atlético Madrid
1954–55	Atlético Madrid	2–4	Real Madrid
1955–56	Real Madrid	3–2	Atlético Madrid
1955–56	Atlético Madrid	1–0	Real Madrid
1956–57	Real Madrid	0–2	Atlético Madrid
1956–57	Atlético Madrid	2–4	Real Madrid
1957–58	Real Madrid	0–0	Atlético Madrid
1957–58	Atlético Madrid	1–1	Real Madrid
1958–59	Real Madrid	5–0	Atlético Madrid
1958–59	Atlético Madrid	2–1	Real Madrid
1959–60	Real Madrid	3–2	Atlético Madrid
1959–60	Atlético Madrid	3–3	Real Madrid
1960–61	Real Madrid	3–1	Atlético Madrid
1960–61	Atlético Madrid	1–0	Real Madrid
1961–62	Real Madrid	2–1	Atlético Madrid
1961–62	Atlético Madrid	1–0	Real Madrid
1962–63	Real Madrid	4–3	Atlético Madrid
1962–63	Atlético Madrid	1–1	Real Madrid
1963–64	Real Madrid	5–1	Atlético Madrid
1963–64	Atlético Madrid	0–1	Real Madrid
1964–65	Real Madrid	0–1	Atlético Madrid
1964–65	Atlético Madrid	0–1	Real Madrid
1965–66	Real Madrid	3–1	Atlético Madrid
1965–66	Atlético Madrid	1–1	Real Madrid
1966–67	Real Madrid	2–1	Atlético Madrid
1966–67	Atlético Madrid	2–2	Real Madrid
1967–68	Real Madrid	0–0	Atlético Madrid
1967–68	Atlético Madrid	1–1	Real Madrid
1968–69	Real Madrid	0–0	Atlético Madrid
1968–69	Atlético Madrid	0–1	Real Madrid
1969–70	Real Madrid	1–1	Atlético Madrid
1969–70	Atlético Madrid	3–0	Real Madrid
1970–71	Real Madrid	1–0	Atlético Madrid
1970–71	Atlético Madrid	2–2	Real Madrid
1971–72	Real Madrid	1–0	Atlético Madrid
1971–72	Atlético Madrid	4–1	Real Madrid
1972–73	Real Madrid	0–1	Atlético Madrid
1972–73	Atlético Madrid	1–2	Real Madrid
1973–74	Real Madrid	2–0	Atlético Madrid
1973–74	Atlético Madrid	0–2	Real Madrid
1974–75	Real Madrid	1–0	Atlético Madrid
1974–75	Atlético Madrid	1–1	Real Madrid
1975–76	Real Madrid	1–0	Atlético Madrid
1975–76	Atlético Madrid	1–0	Real Madrid
1976–77	Real Madrid	1–1	Atlético Madrid
1976–77	Atlético Madrid	4–0	Real Madrid
1977–78	Real Madrid	4–2	Atlético Madrid
1977–78	Atlético Madrid	1–3	Real Madrid
1978–79	Real Madrid	1–1	Atlético Madrid
1978–79	Atlético Madrid	2–2	Real Madrid
1979–80	Real Madrid	4–0	Atlético Madrid
1979–80	Atlético Madrid	1–1	Real Madrid
1980–81	Real Madrid	2–0	Atlético Madrid
1980–81	Atlético Madrid	3–1	Real Madrid
1981–82	Real Madrid	2–1	Atlético Madrid
1981–82	Atlético Madrid	2–3	Real Madrid
1982–83	Real Madrid	3–1	Atlético Madrid
1982–83	Atlético Madrid	0–0	Real Madrid
1983–84	Real Madrid	5–0	Atlético Madrid
1983–84	Atlético Madrid	1–0	Real Madrid
1984–85	Real Madrid	0–4	Atlético Madrid
1984–85	Atlético Madrid	0–1	Real Madrid
1985–86	Real Madrid	2–1	Atlético Madrid
1985–86	Atlético Madrid	0–1	Real Madrid
1986–87	Real Madrid	4–1	Atlético Madrid
1986–87	Atlético Madrid	1–1	Real Madrid
1987–88	Real Madrid	0–4	Atlético Madrid
1987–88	Atlético Madrid	1–3	Real Madrid
1988–89	Real Madrid	2–1	Atlético Madrid
1988–89	Atlético Madrid	3–3	Real Madrid
1989–90	Real Madrid	3–1	Atlético Madrid
1989–90	Atlético Madrid	3–3	Real Madrid
1990–91	Real Madrid	0–3	Atlético Madrid
1990–91	Atlético Madrid	0–3	Real Madrid
1991–92	Real Madrid	3–2	Atlético Madrid
1991–92	Atlético Madrid	2–0	Real Madrid
1992–93	Real Madrid	1–0	Atlético Madrid
1992–93	Atlético Madrid	1–1	Real Madrid
1993–94	Real Madrid	1–0	Atlético Madrid
1993–94	Atlético Madrid	0–0	Real Madrid
1994–95	Real Madrid	4–2	Atlético Madrid
1994–95	Atlético Madrid	0–2	Real Madrid
1995–96	Real Madrid	1–0	Atlético Madrid
1995–96	Atlético Madrid	1–2	Real Madrid
1996–97	Real Madrid	3–1	Atlético Madrid
1996–97	Atlético Madrid	1–4	Real Madrid
1997–98	Real Madrid	1–1	Atlético Madrid
1997–98	Atlético Madrid	1–1	Real Madrid
1998–99	Real Madrid	4–2	Atlético Madrid
1998–99	Atlético Madrid	3–1	Real Madrid
1999–2000	Real Madrid	1–3	Atlético Madrid
1999–2000	Atlético Madrid	1–1	Real Madrid
2000–01	Atlético Madrid in Spanish Second Division		
2001–02	Atlético Madrid in Spanish Second Division		
2002–03	Real Madrid	2–2	Atlético Madrid
2002–03	Atlético Madrid	0–4	Real Madrid
2003–04	Real Madrid	2–0	Atlético Madrid
2003–04	Atlético Madrid	1–2	Real Madrid
2004–05	Real Madrid	0–0	Atlético Madrid
2004–05	Atlético Madrid	0–3	Real Madrid
2005–06	Real Madrid	2–1	Atlético Madrid
2005–06	Atlético Madrid	0–3	Real Madrid
2006–07	Real Madrid	1–1	Atlético Madrid
2006–07	Atlético Madrid	1–1	Real Madrid
2007–08	Real Madrid	2–1	Atlético Madrid
2007–08	Atlético Madrid	0–2	Real Madrid
2008–09	Real Madrid	1–1	Atlético Madrid
2008–09	Atlético Madrid	1–2	Real Madrid
2009–10	Real Madrid	3–2	Atlético Madrid
2009–10	Atlético Madrid	2–3	Real Madrid
2010–11	Real Madrid	2–0	Atlético Madrid
2010–11	Atlético Madrid	1–2	Real Madrid
2011–12	Real Madrid	4–1	Atlético Madrid
2011–12	Atlético Madrid	1–4	Real Madrid
2012–13	Real Madrid	2–0	Atlético Madrid
2012–13	Atlético Madrid	1–2	Real Madrid
2013–14	Real Madrid	0–1	Atlético Madrid
2013–14	Atlético Madrid	2–2	Real Madrid
2014–15	Real Madrid	1–2	Atlético Madrid
2014–15	Atlético Madrid	4–0	Real Madrid
2015–16	Real Madrid	0–1	Atlético Madrid
2015–16	Atlético Madrid	1–1	Real Madrid
2016–17	Real Madrid	1–1	Atlético Madrid
2016–17	Atlético Madrid	0–3	Real Madrid
2017–18	Real Madrid	1–1	Atlético Madrid
2017–18	Atlético Madrid	0–0	Real Madrid
2018–19	Real Madrid	0–0	Atlético Madrid
2018–19	Atlético Madrid	1–3	Real Madrid
2019–20	Real Madrid	1–0	Atlético Madrid
2019–20	Atlético Madrid	0–0	Real Madrid
2020–21	Real Madrid	2–0	Atlético Madrid
2020–21	Atlético Madrid	1–1	Real Madrid
2021–22	Real Madrid	2–0	Atlético Madrid
2021–22	Atlético Madrid	1–0	Real Madrid
2022–23	Real Madrid	1–1	Atlético Madrid
2022–23	Atlético Madrid	1–2	Real Madrid
2023–24	Atlético Madrid	3–1	Real Madrid
2023–24	Real Madrid	1–1	Atlético Madrid
2024–25	Atlético Madrid	1–1	Real Madrid
2024–25	Real Madrid	1–1	Atlético Madrid
2025–26	Atlético Madrid	5–2	Real Madrid
2025–26	Real Madrid	3–2	Atlético Madrid
2026–27	Atlético Madrid	2–1	Real Madrid
2026–27	Real Madrid	–	Atlético Madrid

Real Madrid home wins	Draws	Atlético Madrid away wins
56	18	15

Atlético Madrid home wins	Draws	Real Madrid away wins
28	26	36

=== Head-to-head ranking in La Liga (1929–2026) ===
P.	29	30	31	32	33	34	35	36	40	41	42	43	44	45	46	47	48	49	50	51	52	53	54	55	56	57	58	59	60	61	62	63	64	65	66	67	68	69	70	71	72	73	74	75	76	77	78	79	80	81	82	83	84	85	86	87	88	89	90	91	92	93	94	95	96	97	98	99	00	01	02	03	04	05	06	07	08	09	10	11	12	13	14	15	16	17	18	19	20	21	22	23	24	25	26
1				1	1				1	1									1	1			1	1		1	1			1	1	1	1	1	1	1	1	1	1		1	1		1	1	1	1	1	1						1	1	1	1	1					1	1	1				1		1				1	1				1		1			1			1	1	1		1		
2	2					2	2	2			2		2	2													2	2	2	2		2		2	2								2							2		2	2	2						2	2	2						2						2	2			2	2	2		2		2	2		2	2		2		2		2	2
3											3			3		3	3	3			3	3			3						3									3					3			3		3	3	3					3			3	3										3											3	3	3	3	3	3	3	3		3	3		3	
4									4						4			4	4		4															4				4	4	4											4					4	4				4				4						4				4	4															4		4
5		5																							5	5		5	5																									5	5											5			5												5														
6	6		6							6																											6	6	6					6			6															6			6																														
7							7						7		7	7																	7																							7											7						7			7				7															
8												8										8		8																			8								8																																												
9																				9																										9																																	9																
10		10										10																																																															10																				
11								11									11						11																																																			11																					
12																																																															12									12																							
13																																																	13																			13																											
14																																																																14																															
15																																																																																															
16																																																																																															
17																																																																																															
18																																																																																															
19																																																																					19																										
20																																																																																															
21																																																																																															
22																																																																																															

• Total: Atlético Madrid with 21 higher finishes, Real Madrid with 68 higher finishes (as of the end of the 2025–26 season).

== Domestic cups ==
In domestic cups, the two have been finalists on five occasions in the Copa del Rey in 1960, 1961, 1992, 2013 (all Atlético wins) and 1975 (Real Madrid win). In 1985, they met in the two-legged final of the Copa de la Liga with each winning their home leg, although Real Madrid prevailed on aggregate. In 2014, they met in the two-legged final of the Supercopa de España: the first leg, at the Santiago Bernabéu, finished in a 1–1 draw, while the second leg, at the Vicente Calderón, ended in a 1–0 Atlético victory. With a 2–1 aggregate score, the rojiblancos won the title. They would once again meet in the one-legged final of the Spanish Super Cup in the 2019–20 season, with Real Madrid prevailing 4–1 on penalties following a 0–0 draw after extra time at the King Abdullah Sports City stadium in Jeddah, Saudi Arabia.

=== Copa del Rey matches ===
As of 18 January 2024

Real Madrid wins	18
Draws	14
Atlético Madrid wins	12
Real Madrid goals	62
Atlético Madrid goals	50
Total matches	44

Season	Home team	Score	Away team
1927–28 (Note: Group stage)	Real Madrid	3–0	Atlético Madrid
1927–28	Atlético Madrid	0–1	Real Madrid
1949–50 (Note: Quarter-final)	Real Madrid	6–3	Atlético Madrid
1949–50	Atlético Madrid	1–0	Real Madrid
1950–51	Atlético Madrid	0–1	Real Madrid
1950–51	Real Madrid	1–1	Atlético Madrid
1957–58 (Note: Round of 16)	Real Madrid	4–0	Atlético Madrid
1957–58	Atlético Madrid	0–1	Real Madrid
1959–60; Final	Atlético Madrid	3–1	Real Madrid
1960–61; Final	Atlético Madrid	3–2	Real Madrid
1963–64 (Note: Tie-breaker played after two draws)	Real Madrid	2–2	Atlético Madrid
1963–64	Atlético Madrid	1–1	Real Madrid
1963–64	Real Madrid	1–2	Atlético Madrid
1964–65	Real Madrid	1–0	Atlético Madrid
1964–65	Atlético Madrid	4–0	Real Madrid
1968–69	Atlético Madrid	2–1	Real Madrid
1968–69	Real Madrid	0–0	Atlético Madrid
1974–75; Final	Real Madrid	0–0 (Note: After extra time. Real Madrid won 4–3 on penalties.)	Atlético Madrid
1978–79 (Note: Third round)	Atlético Madrid	1–1	Real Madrid
1978–79	Real Madrid	2–2 (Note: Real Madrid won 4–1 on penalties)	Atlético Madrid
1979–80 (Note: Semi-final)	Atlético Madrid	0–0	Real Madrid
1979–80	Real Madrid	1–1 (Note: Real Madrid won 4–3 on penalties)	Atlético Madrid
1981–82	Real Madrid	0–0	Atlético Madrid
1981–82	Atlético Madrid	0–1	Real Madrid
1986–87	Real Madrid	3–2	Atlético Madrid
1986–87	Atlético Madrid	2–0	Real Madrid
1988–89	Atlético Madrid	0–2	Real Madrid
1988–89	Real Madrid	1–0	Atlético Madrid
1989–90	Atlético Madrid	0–0	Real Madrid
1989–90	Real Madrid	2–0	Atlético Madrid
1990–91	Real Madrid	1–1	Atlético Madrid
1990–91	Atlético Madrid	1–0	Real Madrid
1991–92; Final	Atlético Madrid	2–0	Real Madrid
1993–94	Real Madrid	2–2	Atlético Madrid
1993–94	Atlético Madrid	2–3	Real Madrid
2010–11	Real Madrid	3–1	Atlético Madrid
2010–11	Atlético Madrid	0–1	Real Madrid
2012–13; Final	Real Madrid	1–2 (Note: After extra time, 1–1 after 90 minutes.)	Atlético Madrid
2013–14	Real Madrid	3–0	Atlético Madrid
2013–14	Atlético Madrid	0–2	Real Madrid
2014–15	Atlético Madrid	2–0	Real Madrid
2014–15	Real Madrid	2–2	Atlético Madrid
2022–23	Real Madrid	3–1	Atlético Madrid
2023–24	Atlético Madrid	4–2 (Note: After extra time, 2–2 after 90 minutes.)	Real Madrid

=== Copa de la Liga matches ===
Real Madrid wins	1
Draws	1
Atlético Madrid wins	2
Real Madrid goals	7
Atlético Madrid goals	7
Total matches	4

Season	Home team	Score	Away team
1984 (Note: First round)	Real Madrid	1–1	Atlético Madrid
1984	Atlético Madrid	3–2	Real Madrid
1985 (Note: Final)	Atlético Madrid	3–2	Real Madrid
1985	Real Madrid	2–0	Atlético Madrid

=== Supercopa de España matches ===
As of 8 January 2026

Real Madrid wins	2
Draws	2
Atlético Madrid wins	1
Real Madrid goals	8
Atlético Madrid goals	6
Total matches	5

Season	Home team	Score	Away team
2014	Real Madrid	1–1	Atlético Madrid
2014	Atlético Madrid	1–0	Real Madrid
2019–20 (Note: Final. Neutral venue.)	Real Madrid	0–0 (Note: After extra time, 0–0 after 90 minutes.) (Note: Real Madrid won 4–1 on penalties)	Atlético Madrid
2023–24 (Note: Semi-final. Neutral venue.)	Real Madrid	5–3 (Note: After extra time, 3–3 after 90 minutes.)	Atlético Madrid
2025–26	Atlético Madrid	1–2	Real Madrid

== European competitions ==
The two clubs met in the semi-finals of the 1958–59 European Cup. Atlético had qualified as La Liga runners-up; the Spanish champions, Real Madrid, had already qualified as European Cup holders. The tie finished 2–2 on aggregate, and Real Madrid won the play-off game held in Zaragoza. Real then went on to win the trophy for the fourth consecutive time.

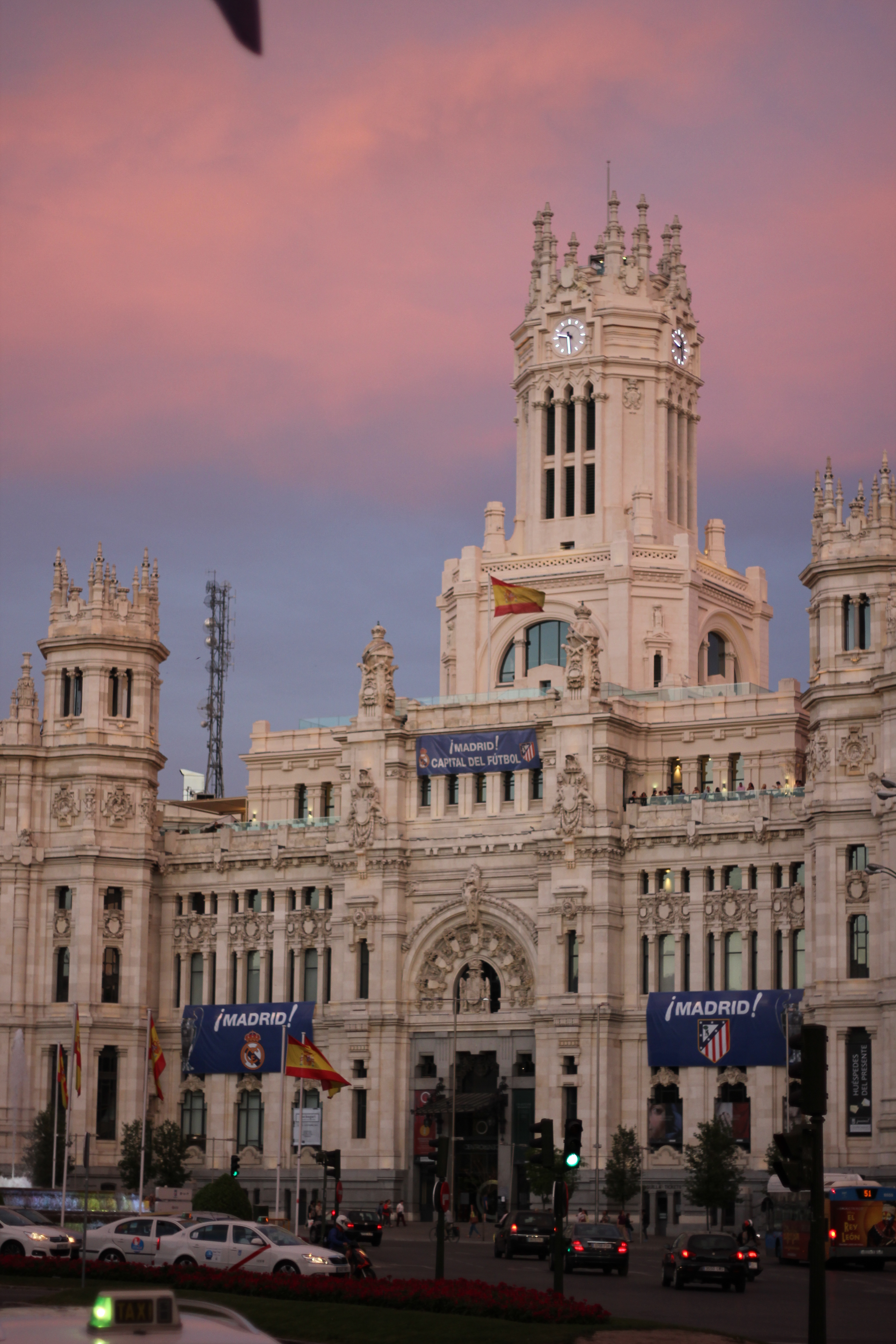
During the 2014 Champions League final between Atlético and Real, the City Council of Madrid building was decorated with banners of both clubs.

The two clubs met in Lisbon for the 2014 Champions League final, making it the first time two clubs from the same city played in the final. Real Madrid won 4–1 after extra time, earning their tenth European Cup after having last won in 2002. They met again in the quarter-finals of the 2014–15 Champions League. The score was 0–0 at the Vicente Calderón and 1–0 in favour of Real Madrid at the Santiago Bernabéu.

The two rivals met again in Milan for the 2016 Champions League final. After a 1–1 draw, Real Madrid won 5–3 on penalties. They met each other again in the semi-finals of the 2016–17 UEFA Champions League. Atlético were beaten 3–0 in the first leg at the Santiago Bernabéu with all three goals scored by Cristiano Ronaldo. The second leg took place at the Vincente Calderon, which was the last European fixture at the iconic stadium. The home side was victorious, winning 2–1, however they were eliminated once again by their fierce rivals with the final aggregate score being 4–2 to Real who went on to beat Juventus in the 2017 Champions League final.

The two clubs faced each other in the 2018 UEFA Super Cup, with Real having won the 2017–18 Champions League, and Atlético having won the 2017–18 Europa League. Atlético came from behind to win the match 4–2 after extra time for their third Super Cup title. This was the first ever meeting of two teams from the same city in the UEFA Super Cup.

=== Champions League matches ===
As of 12 March 2025

Real Madrid wins	6
Draws	2
Atlético Madrid wins	3
Real Madrid goals	16
Atlético Madrid goals	9
Total matches	11

Season	Home team	Score	Away team
1958–59 (Note: Semi-final)	Real Madrid	2–1	Atlético Madrid
1958–59	Atlético Madrid	1–0	Real Madrid
1958–59	Real Madrid	2–1 (Note: Tiebreaker at neutral venue)	Atlético Madrid
2013–14; Final (Note: Neutral venue)	Real Madrid	4–1 (Note: After extra time, 1–1 after 90 minutes.)	Atlético Madrid
2014–15 (Note: Quarter-final)	Atlético Madrid	0–0	Real Madrid
2014–15	Real Madrid	1–0	Atlético Madrid
2015–16; Final	Real Madrid	1–1 (Note: After extra time, 1–1 after 90 minutes.) (Note: Real Madrid won 5–3 on penalties)	Atlético Madrid
2016–17	Real Madrid	3–0	Atlético Madrid
2016–17	Atlético Madrid	2–1	Real Madrid
2024–25 (Note: Round of 16; 2–2 on aggregate, Real Madrid won 4–2 on penalties.)	Real Madrid	2–1	Atlético Madrid
2024–25	Atlético Madrid	1–0	Real Madrid

=== Super Cup matches ===
As of 15 August 2018

Real Madrid wins	0
Draws	0
Atlético Madrid wins	1
Real Madrid goals	2
Atlético Madrid goals	4
Total matches	1

Season	Home team	Score	Away team
2018 (Note: Neutral venue)	Real Madrid	2–4 (Note: After extra time, 2–2 after 90 minutes.)	Atlético Madrid

== Regional tournaments, friendly cups and club friendlies ==
=== Campeonato Regional Centro ===
Date	Home team	Score	Away team
2 December 1906	Real Madrid	2–1	Atlético Madrid
15 March 1908	Real Madrid	w/o	Atlético Madrid
19 March 1908	Real Madrid	3–0	Atlético Madrid
30 January 1909	Real Madrid	0–2	Atlético Madrid
19 March 1909	Real Madrid	2–1	Atlético Madrid
16 February 1913	Atlético Madrid	3–3	Real Madrid
9 March 1913	Real Madrid	3–2	Atlético Madrid
16 November 1913	Real Madrid	2–0	Atlético Madrid
25 January 1914	Atlético Madrid	2–0	Real Madrid
29 November 1914	Real Madrid	3–2	Atlético Madrid
7 January 1915	Atlético Madrid	1–1	Real Madrid
6 February 1916	Real Madrid	2–0	Atlético Madrid
20 February 1916	Atlético Madrid	0–2	Real Madrid
5 November 1916	Atlético Madrid	2–3	Real Madrid
23 January 1917	Real Madrid	3–0	Atlético Madrid
25 November 1917	Atlético Madrid	4–1	Real Madrid
24 February 1918	Real Madrid	3–1	Atlético Madrid
24 November 1918	Atlético Madrid	0–2	Real Madrid
20 April 1919	Real Madrid	5–0	Atlético Madrid
21 December 1919	Atlético Madrid	1–3	Real Madrid
22 February 1920	Real Madrid	2–3	Atlético Madrid
28 November 1920	Atlético Madrid	2–0	Real Madrid
20 February 1921	Real Madrid	1–2	Atlético Madrid

=== Copa Rodriguez Arzuaga ===
Date	Home team	Score	Away team
2 February 1910	Real Madrid	3–0	Atlético Madrid
2 February 1911	Real Madrid	1–1	Atlético Madrid
4 February 1912	Atlético Madrid	1–1	Real Madrid

=== Friendlies ===
Date	Home team	Score	Away team
13 November 1904	Real Madrid	6–0	Atlético Madrid
19 February 1905	Atlético Madrid	0–4	Real Madrid
28 February 1905	Real Madrid	1–1	Atlético Madrid
26 March 1905	Real Madrid	3–0	Atlético Madrid
24 October 1909	Real Madrid	2–1	Atlético Madrid
14 November 1909	Real Madrid	2–1	Atlético Madrid
9 October 1910	Atlético Madrid	0–3	Real Madrid
30 October 1910	Real Madrid	3–0	Atlético Madrid
27 November 1910	Real Madrid	3–1	Atlético Madrid
2 April 1911	Real Madrid	3–1	Atlético Madrid
22 October 1911	Real Madrid	1–0	Atlético Madrid
19 November 1911 (Note: The 'Copa Julián Ruete')	Real Madrid	1–1	Atlético Madrid
27 July 2019 (Note: International Champions Cup)	Real Madrid	3–7	Atlético Madrid

== Honours ==
As of 18 December 2024

- Numbers with this background indicate the record in the competition.

Atlético Madrid	Competition	Real Madrid
Regional
4	Campeonato Regional Centro (defunct)	23
1	Copa Federación Centro (defunct)	4
5	Aggregate	27
Domestic
11	La Liga	36
10	Copa del Rey	20
2	Supercopa de España	13
1	Copa Eva Duarte (defunct)	1
1	1941–47 FEF President Cup (defunct)	—
—	Copa de la Liga (defunct)	1
25	Aggregate	71
European
—	UEFA Champions League	15
1	UEFA Cup Winners' Cup (defunct)	—
3	UEFA Europa League	2
3	UEFA Super Cup	6
—	Latin Cup (defunct)	2
0	UEFA Intertoto Cup	0
7	Aggregate	25
Worldwide
—	Ibero-American Cup (defunct)	1
1	Intercontinental Cup (defunct)	3
—	FIFA Club World Cup	5
—	FIFA Intercontinental Cup	1
1	Aggregate	10
38	Total aggregate	133

== Players who won La Liga titles with both clubs ==
- (Spain) José Luis Pérez-Payá (Atlético Madrid 1950–51; Real Madrid 1953–54, 1954–55)
- (Belgium) Thibaut Courtois (Atlético Madrid 2013–14; Real Madrid 2019–20, 2021–22, 2023–24)

== Players who played for both clubs ==
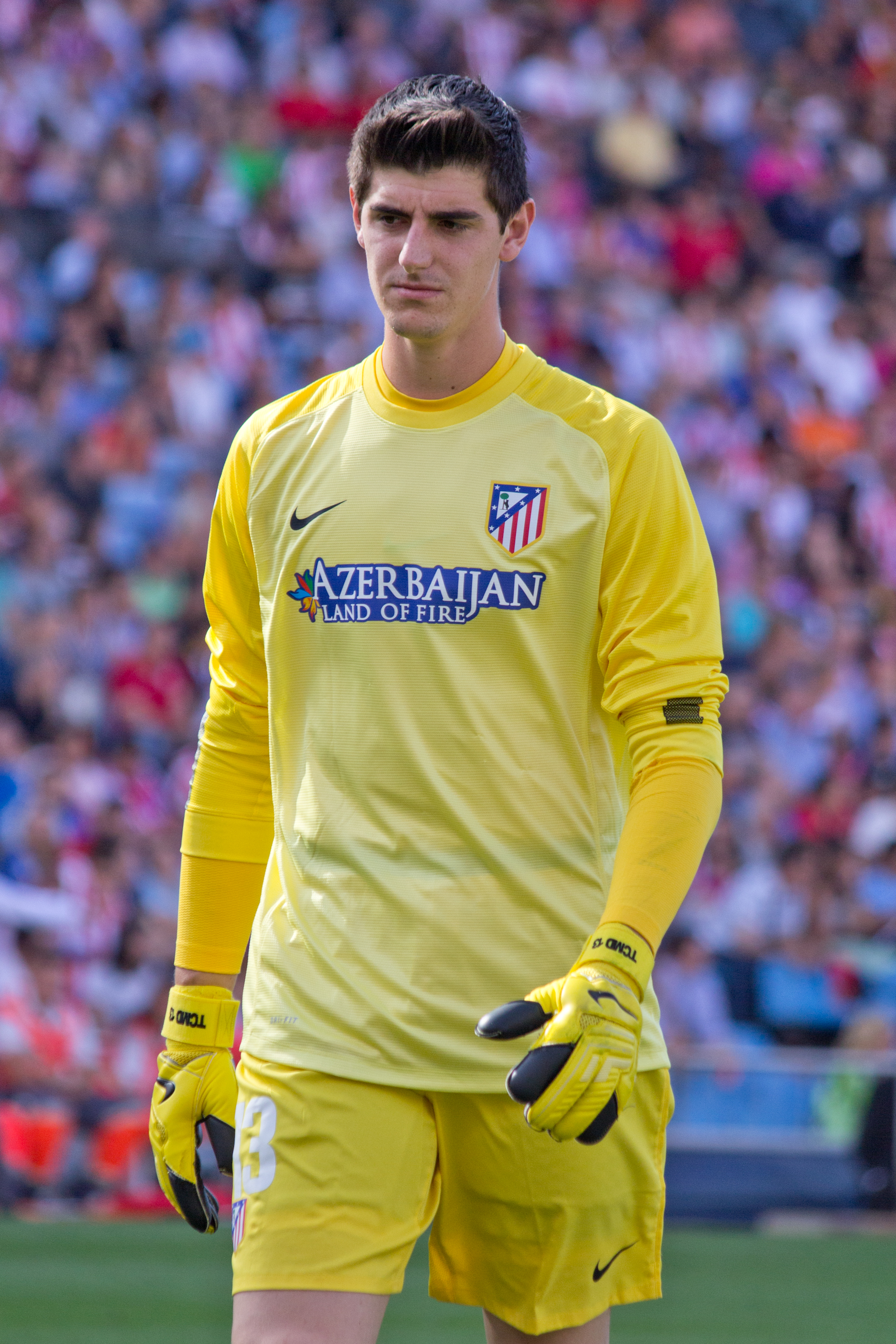
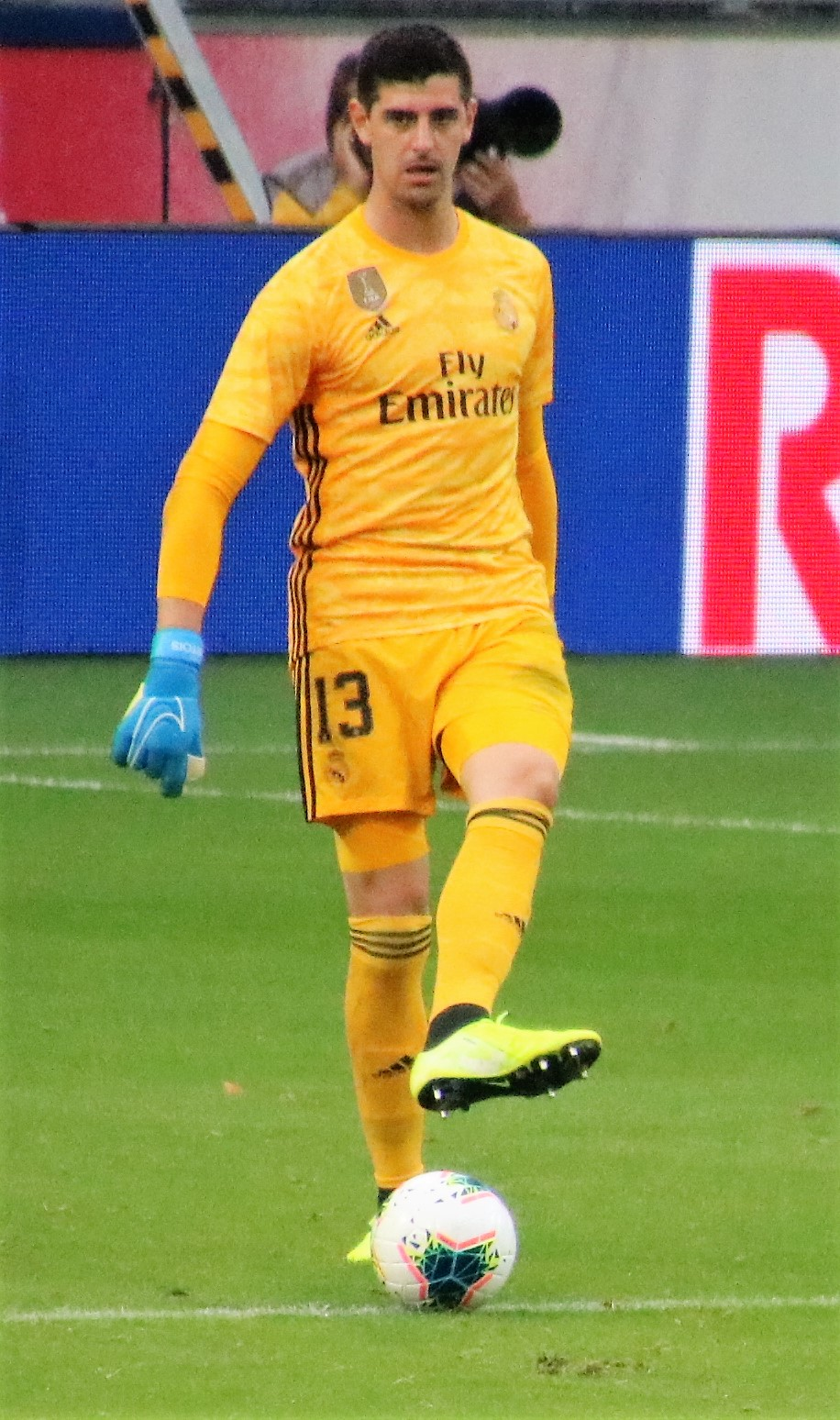
Thibaut Courtois has made over 100 league appearances for both Atlético Madrid and Real Madrid
- 1905: (Spain) Ramón de Cárdenas (via Español de Madrid)
- 1910: (Spain) Julián Ruete (via Athletic Bilbao)
- 1914: (Spain) Luis Belaunde Prendes
- 1915: (Spain) Andrés Arístegui
- 1916: (Spain) Joaquín Caruncho
- 1916: (Spain) Juan de Cárcer
- 1919: (Spain) José Luis Tovar
- 1920: (Spain) Santiago Bernabéu (1921. return to Real Madrid)
- 1920: (Spain) Javier Barroso
- 1920: (Spain) José María Sansinenea
- 1923: (Spain) José Antonio Ortueta
- 1923: (Spain) José María Benguría
- 1923: (Spain) Manuel García de la Mata
- 1927: (Puerto Rico) Eduardo Ordóñez (1932. return to Real Madrid, 1933. return to Atlético Madrid)
- 1928: (Spain) Monchín Triana
- 1928: (Spain) Cándido Martínez
- 1929: (Spain) José Cabo
- 1929: (Spain) Luis Olaso
- 1929: (Spain) Cosme Vázquez
- 1930: (Spain) Francisco Moraleda
- 1930: (Spain) José Ramón Ochandiano
- 1932: (Spain) Gaspar Rubio (1939. return to Real Madrid)
- 1932: (Spain) Manuel Valderrama
- 1933: (Spain) Francisco Gómez Vicente
- 1934: (Spain) Ramón de Mendizábal (via Hércules)
- 1935: (Spain) Santiago Losada
- 1935: (Spain) Jaime Lazcano
- 1939: (Spain) Luis Marín
- 1939: (Spain) Juan Antonio Ipiña
- 1939: (Spain) Luis Miranda Junco
- 1940: (Spain) Adolfo Bracero
- 1940: (Spain) Rafael Suárez (via Nacional de Madrid, then Imperio)
- 1941: (Spain) Pruden (via Salamanca)
- 1941: (Spain) Salvador Fernández-Pacheco
- 1943: (Spain) Luis Martín Camino
- 1945: (Spain) José Luis Palacios Lázaro
- 1949: (Spain) Pablo Olmedo (1950. return to Real Madrid)
- 1952: (Spain) Rafael Lesmes (via Valladolid)
- 1953: (Spain) José Luis Pérez-Payá
- 1955: (Spain) Manuel Pazos (via Hércules)
- 1962: (Spain) Montejano (via Cádiz, Plus Ultra, Levante, Racing Santander, Córdoba then Murcia)
- 1964: (Spain) Luis Aragonés (via Real Oviedo, then Real Betis)
- 1964: (Spain) Ramón Grosso
- 1964: (Czechoslovakia) Yanko Daucik
- 1985: (Mexico) Hugo Sánchez
- 1987: (Spain) Paco Llorente
- 1989: (Spain) Joaquín Parra
- 1990: (Germany) Bernd Schuster
- 1991: (Spain) Sebastián Losada
- 1992: (Spain) Jorge Alberto Rajado Martín
- 1995: (Spain) Miquel Soler (via Barcelona, then Sevilla)
- 1996: (Argentina) Juan Esnáider
- 1997: (Spain) Pedro Jaro (via Real Betis)
- 2000: (Argentina) Santiago Solari
- 2001: (Spain) José García Calvo (via Valladolid)
- 2003: (Brazil) Rodrigo Fabri
- 2005: (Uruguay) Pablo García (via Milan, Venezia, then Osasuna)
- 2006: (Spain) José Manuel Jurado
- 2007: (Spain) José Antonio Reyes
- 2011: (Spain) Juanfran (via Osasuna)
- 2018: (Spain) Antonio Adán (via Cagliari, then Real Betis)
- 2018: (Belgium) Thibaut Courtois (via Chelsea)
- 2019: (Spain) Álvaro Morata (via Chelsea)
- 2019: (Spain) Marcos Llorente
- 2022: (Spain) Sergio Reguilón (via Sevilla, then Tottenham Hotspur)

== All-time top scorers ==
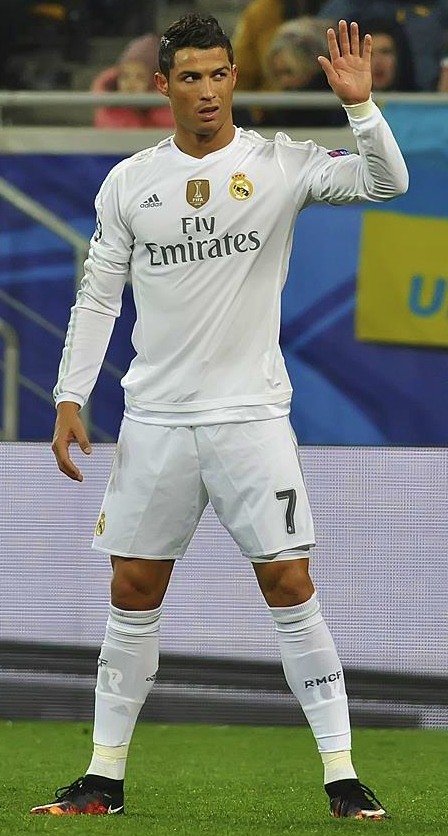
Cristiano Ronaldo is the all-time top scorer in the Madrid derby with 22 goals.

As of 22 March 2026, the top scorer of all time in the Madrid derby is Cristiano Ronaldo with 22 goals scored, all for Real Madrid. The top scorer for Atlético in the derby matches is Paco Campos, with 12 goals.

Rank	Nat.	Player	Goals
1	(Portugal)	Cristiano Ronaldo	22
2	(Argentina)	Alfredo Di Stéfano	17
3	(Spain)	Raúl	15
3	(Spain)	Santillana	15
5	(Hungary)	Ferenc Puskás	13
6	(Spain)	Santiago Bernabéu	12
6	(Spain)	Emilio Butragueño	12
6	(Spain)	Paco Campos	12

== Players with most appearances ==
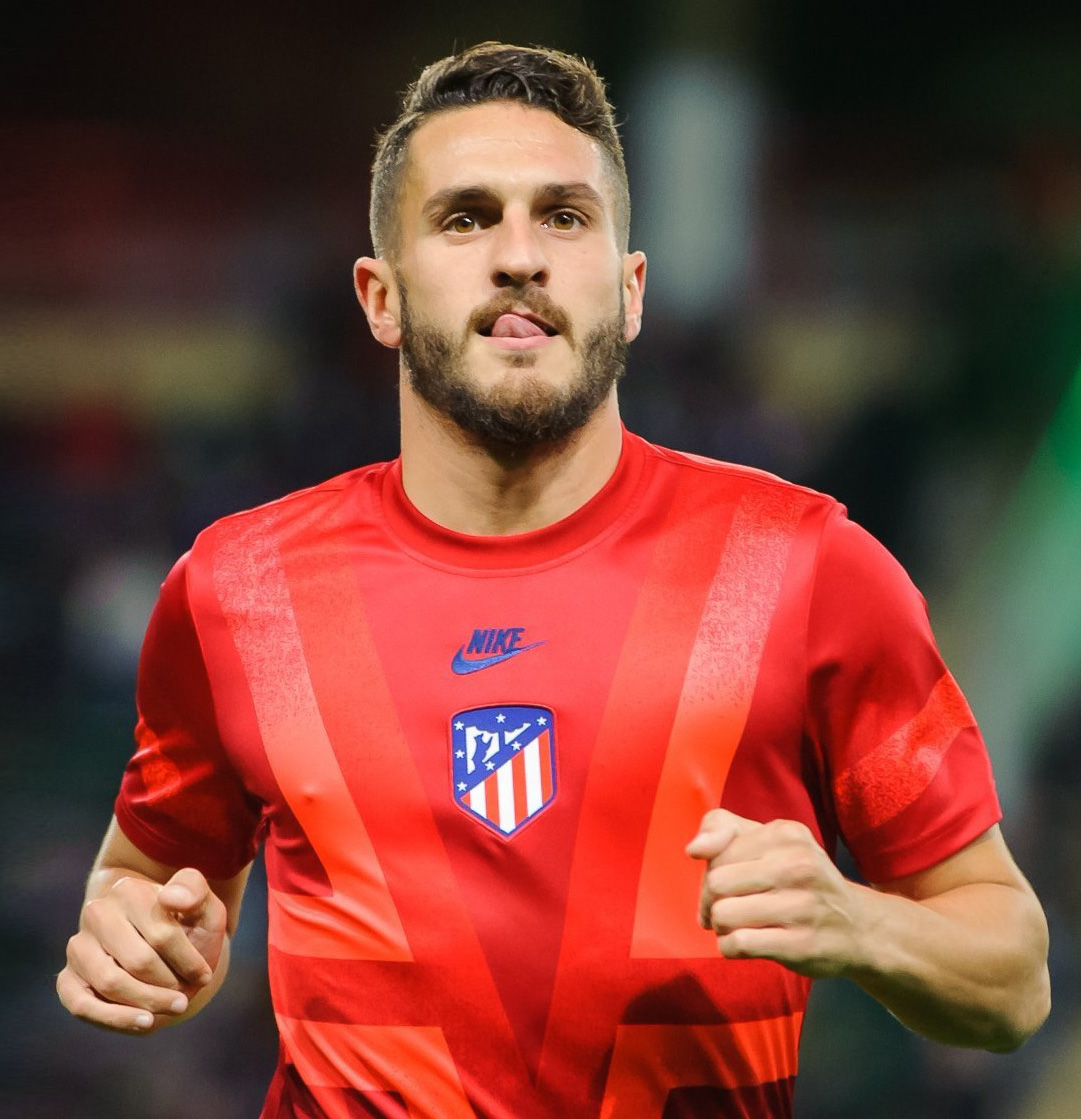
Koke has made the most appearances in the Madrid derby (45).

The player with the most appearances in the Madrid derby is Atlético's Koke with 45 matches in all competitions. Players in bold are still active for Atlético or Real Madrid.

As of 20 September 2026

Rank	Nat.	Player	Appearances
1	(Spain)	**Koke**	46
2	(Spain)	Sergio Ramos	43
3	(Spain)	Paco Gento	42
3	(Croatia)	Luka Modrić	42
3	(Spain)	Manolo Sanchís	42
6	(France)	Karim Benzema	39
7	(Slovenia)	**Jan Oblak**	37
8	(Spain)	Míchel	36
8	(Spain)	Santillana	36
10	(Spain)	Adelardo	35
10	(Spain)	Chendo	35

== See also ==
- List of association football rivalries
- Madrid basketball derby
- El Clásico
- Derbi barceloní
- El Viejo Clásico
