= 2013 Copa del Rey final =

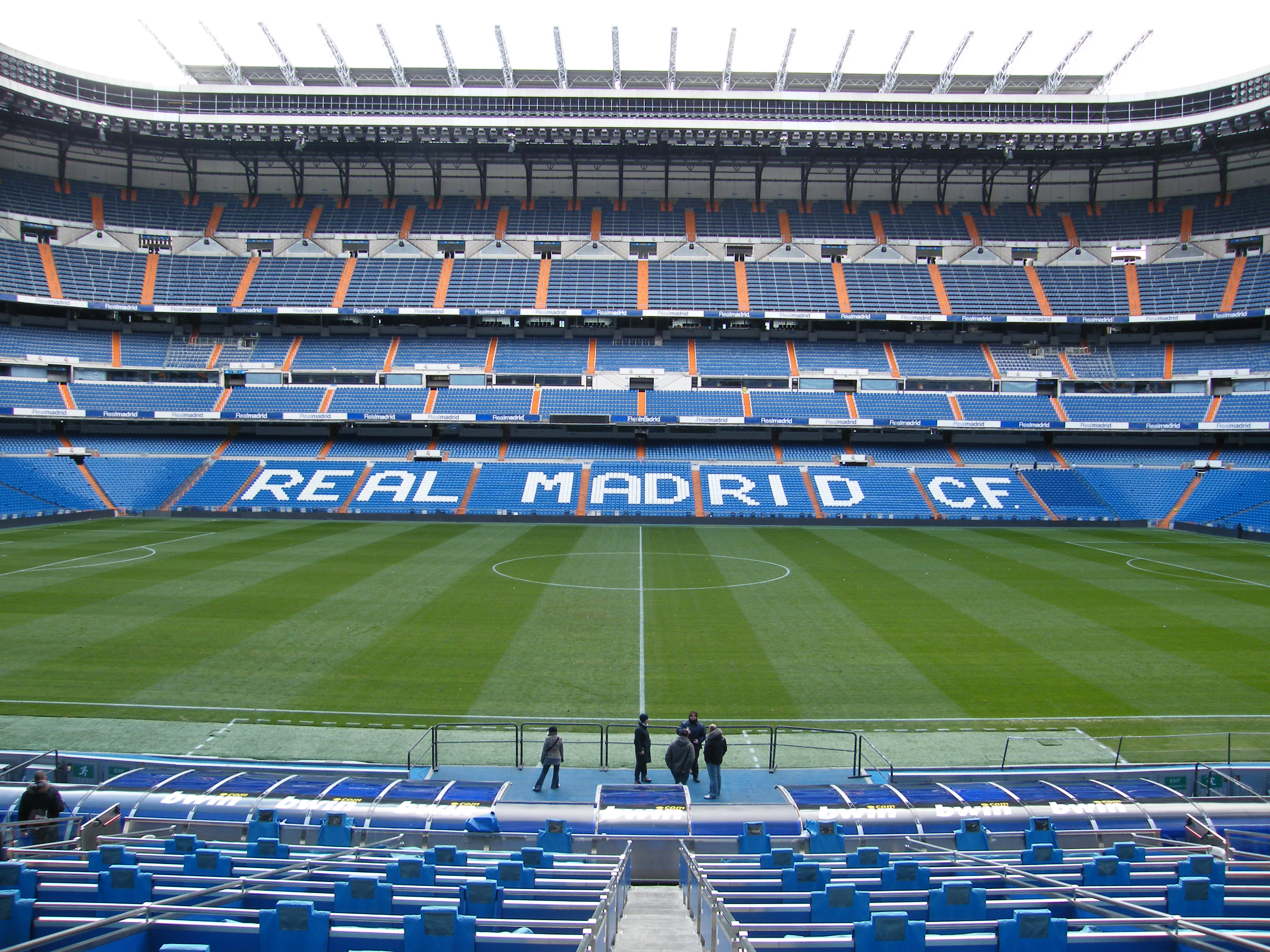
- Santiago Bernabéu in Madrid hosted the final
- Event: 2012–13 Copa del Rey
Real Madrid	Atlético Madrid
1	2
- After extra time
- Date: 17 May 2013
- Venue: Santiago Bernabéu, Madrid
- Man of the Match: Thibaut Courtois (Atlético Madrid)
- Referee: Carlos Clos Gómez
- Attendance: 80,000
- Weather: Mostly Cloudy; 9 °C (48 °F)

The 2013 Copa del Rey final was the 111th final since the tournament's establishment (including two seasons where two rival editions were played). The match was a Madrid derby between Real Madrid and Atlético Madrid on 17 May 2013 at the Santiago Bernabéu Stadium in Madrid. It was the clubs' first meeting in the final since 1992 when Atlético won 2–0 over Real Madrid. Before this match, the two teams had met in the final on three other occasions: 1960, 1961 and 1975; all were Atlético wins, except 1975 when Real Madrid won.

Atlético lifted the trophy for the tenth time in their history. It was the first time since 1992 that Atlético had won trophies in two consecutive seasons, following their win in the 2012 UEFA Europa League Final the previous year.

== Venue and date ==
Real Madrid, Atlético Madrid and the Royal Spanish Football Federation (RFEF) all agreed on Madrid as the location for the event. Due to its greater capacity of 80,000, the Santiago Bernabéu Stadium (Real Madrid's home ground) was chosen as the venue over Atlético's Vicente Calderón stadium. Each team was allocated 30,000 tickets to sell, and the remainder were allocated to the RFEF.

The match was originally scheduled for Saturday, 18 May, but was moved to Friday, 17 May for TV broadcast reasons.

== Match ball ==
Adidas provided the official ball for the match, the Adidas Cafusa, the same ball used for the 2013 FIFA Confederations Cup.

== Road to the final ==
Real Madrid			Round	Atlético Madrid
Opponent	Result	Legs		Opponent	Result	Legs
Alcoyano	7–1	4–1 away; 3–0 home	Round of 32	Real Jaén	4–0	3–0 away; 1–0 home
Celta Vigo	5–2	1–2 away; 4–0 home	Round of 16	Getafe	3–0	3–0 home; 0–0 away
Valencia	3–1	2–0 home; 1–1 away	Quarter-finals	Real Betis	3–1	2–0 home; 1–1 away
Barcelona	4–2	1–1 home; 3–1 away	Semi-finals	Sevilla	4–3	2–1 home; 2–2 away

== Match ==
17 May 2013
21:30 CEST

Real Madrid	1–2 (a.e.t.)	Atlético Madrid
Ronaldo 14'	Report	Costa 35'; Miranda 98'

Santiago Bernabéu, Madrid
Attendance: 80,000
Referee: Carlos Clos Gómez

Real Madrid	Atlético Madrid

GK	25	(Spain) Diego López
RB	15	(Ghana) Michael Essien	(yellow card) 101'
CB	18	(Spain) Raúl Albiol
CB	4	(Spain) Sergio Ramos (c)	(yellow card) 74'
LB	5	(Portugal) Fábio Coentrão	(yellow card) 54'	(substituted off) 91'
CM	14	(Spain) Xabi Alonso
CM	6	(Germany) Sami Khedira	(yellow card) 65'
RW	10	(Germany) Mesut Özil	(yellow card) 72'
AM	19	(Croatia) Luka Modrić		(substituted off) 91'
LW	7	(Portugal) Cristiano Ronaldo	(yellow card) 90+3' (red card) 115'
CF	9	(France) Karim Benzema		(substituted off) 91'
Substitutes:
GK	1	(Spain) Iker Casillas
DF	11	(Portugal) Ricardo Carvalho
DF	17	(Spain) Álvaro Arbeloa		(substituted on) 91'
MF	8	(Brazil) Kaká
MF	21	(Spain) José Callejón
MF	22	(Argentina) Ángel Di María	(yellow card) 119'	(substituted on) 91'
FW	20	(Argentina) Gonzalo Higuaín		(substituted on) 91'
Manager:
(Portugal) José Mourinho (red card) 76'

GK	13	(Belgium) Thibaut Courtois
RB	20	(Spain) Juanfran
CB	2	(Uruguay) Diego Godín
CB	23	(Brazil) Miranda	(yellow card) 120+3'
LB	3	(Brazil) Filipe Luís
CM	4	(Spain) Mario Suárez	(yellow card) 100'
CM	14	(Spain) Gabi (c)	(yellow card) 114' (yellow-red card) 120+5'
RW	6	(Spain) Koke	(yellow card) 105+1'	(substituted off) 113'
LW	10	(Turkey) Arda Turan	(yellow card) 37'	(substituted off) 111'
CF	19	(Brazil) Diego Costa	(yellow card) 69'	(substituted off) 105'
CF	9	(Colombia) Radamel Falcao
Substitutes:
GK	25	(Spain) Sergio Asenjo
DF	18	(Argentina) Cata Díaz
MF	5	(Portugal) Tiago
MF	7	(Spain) Adrián		(substituted on) 105'
MF	8	(Spain) Raúl García		(substituted on) 113'
MF	11	(Uruguay) Cristian Rodríguez		(substituted on) 111'
FW	30	(Spain) Óliver
Manager:
(Argentina) Diego Simeone

== See also ==
- 2012–13 Copa del Rey
- Madrid derby
