= Ramiro (footballer, born 1933) =

Brazilian footballer and manager (1933–2025)

Personal information
- Full name: Ramiro Rodrigues Valente
- Date of birth: 11 February 1933
- Place of birth: São Paulo, Brazil
- Date of death: 17 July 2025 (aged 92)
- Place of death: Valdagno, Italy
- Height: 1.81 m (5 ft 11 in)
- Positions: Defender; midfielder

Senior career*
Years	Team	Apps	(Gls)
1952	Jabaquara		
1952–1955	Fluminense		
1955–1959	Santos		
1959–1965	Atlético Madrid	117	(24)

Managerial career
- 1991: Santos
- * Club domestic league appearances and goals

Ramiro Rodrigues Valente (11 February 1933 – 17 July 2025), simply known as Ramiro, was a Brazilian football manager and player. A versatile player, he was mostly utilized as a central defender or a defensive midfielder, but could also play as a full-back or a right midfielder.

Ramiro died on 17 July 2025, at the age of 92. His brother Álvaro was also a footballer. Both played together at Jabaquara, Santos and Atlético Madrid.

== Honours ==
=== Player ===
Santos

- Campeonato Paulista: 1955, 1956, 1958
- Torneio Rio – São Paulo: 1959

Atlético Madrid

- Copa del Generalísimo: 1959–60, 1960–61, 1964–65
- UEFA Cup Winners' Cup: 1961–62
