= Álvaro (footballer, born 1931) =

Brazilian footballer (1931–1991)

Personal information
- Full name: Álvaro José Rodrigues Valente
- Date of birth: 24 September 1931
- Place of birth: Guarujá, Brazil
- Date of death: 21 September 1991 (aged 59)
- Place of death: Guarujá, Brazil
- Position: Forward

Youth career
- Guarujá AC

Senior career*
Years	Team	Apps	(Gls)
- Jabaquara
1953–1959	Santos		
1959–1961	Atlético Madrid	11	(3)
1961	Santos		

International career
1955–1956	Brazil	9	(2)

Managerial career
- 1972: Marília
- * Club domestic league appearances and goals

Álvaro José Rodrigues Valente (24 September 1931 – 21 September 1991), known as just Álvaro, was a Brazilian football player and manager. He played as a forward for Jabaquara, Santos and Atlético Madrid, and appeared in nine official matches for the Brazil national team in 1955 and 1956. He was also part of Brazil's squad for the 1956 South American Championship.

His brother Ramiro was also a footballer. Both played together at Jabaquara, Santos and Atlético Madrid.
