= Thibaut Courtois =

Belgian footballer (born 1992)

- Courtois with Belgium in 2026

Personal information
- Full name: Thibaut Nicolas Marc Courtois
- Date of birth: 11 May 1992 (age 34)
- Place of birth: Bree, Belgium
- Height: 2.01 m (6 ft 7 in)
- Position: Goalkeeper

Team information
- Current team: Real Madrid
- Number: 1

Youth career
- 1997–1999: Bilzen V.V.
- 1999–2009: Genk

Senior career*
Years	Team	Apps	(Gls)
2009–2011	Genk	41	(0)
2011–2018	Chelsea	126	(0)
2011–2014	→ Atlético Madrid (loan)	111	(0)
2018–	Real Madrid	244	(0)

International career^{‡}
2009–2010	Belgium U18	4	(0)
2011–	Belgium	115	(0)
Medal record
Men's football
Representing Belgium
FIFA World Cup
Third place	2018 Russia
- * Club domestic league appearances and goals as of 22:04, 21 November 2026 (UTC) ‡ National team caps and goals as of 22:10, 10 July 2026 (UTC)

Thibaut Nicolas Marc Courtois (Note: French pronunciation: [tibo kuʁtwa] Dutch pronunciation: [ˈtiboː kurˈtʋaː]) (born 11 May 1992) is a Belgian professional footballer who plays as a goalkeeper for La Liga club Real Madrid and the Belgium national team. He is regarded as one of the greatest goalkeepers of all time.

Courtois began his career with Genk and made his senior debut in 2009, at age 16; he went on to establish himself as the club's starting goalkeeper and won the Belgian Pro League. In 2011, Courtois signed for Chelsea in a transfer worth a reported £8 million (€9 million), but then joined Atlético Madrid on loan. At Atlético, Courtois won a La Liga title, the Copa del Rey, the Europa League, and reached the UEFA Champions League final. He returned to Chelsea in 2014 and won two Premier League titles and the EFL Cup. In 2018, Courtois signed for Real Madrid in a deal worth a reported £35 million (€38.8 million), becoming the most expensive goalkeeper signed by a La Liga club, and where he has gone on to win three La Liga and two UEFA Champions League titles.

Courtois made his senior international debut for Belgium in 2011 at age 19, becoming their youngest senior international goalkeeper. He has since earned over 110 caps, ranking seventh-highest in appearances for the national team, while appearing in six major tournaments. At the 2018 FIFA World Cup, Courtois won the Golden Glove as the best goalkeeper, helping Belgium finish third, which is their highest-ever finish at the competition.

Courtois has won the Ricardo Zamora Trophy three times, the Premier League Golden Glove once, and was named the third-best goalkeeper of the decade (2011–2020) by the International Federation of Football History & Statistics (IFFHS).

== Club career ==
=== Early career at Genk ===
Courtois was born in the city of Bree in Flanders, to a Walloon father and a Flemish mother. He began his career with local side Bilzen V.V., as a left back. Soon after, in 1999, he joined Racing Genk at the age of seven, and it was there that he was converted to a goalkeeper.

Courtois progressed through the Genk youth system, where Koen Casteels was initially regarded as the starting goalkeeper. However, during Casteels’ injury crisis, Courtois, aged 16 years and 341 days, made his first team debut on 17 April 2009 for Gent. After turning down a transfer to TSG Hoffenheim from the Bundesliga, Courtois was made first-choice goalkeeper for the 2010–11 season ahead of Casteels, when Laszlo Koteles' registration ran into issues.

He was a key figure in Genk's title victory in the 2010–11 season in the Belgian Pro League. He received the Goalkeeper of the Year and Genk's Player of the Year award, only conceding 32 goals over the course of 40 league matches, and keeping 14 clean sheets for Genk.

=== Atlético Madrid ===
In July 2011, Courtois joined Premier League club Chelsea for a reported €9 million, signing a five-year deal. Within weeks of joining Chelsea, Courtois was sent on a season-long loan to Atlético Madrid.

==== 2011–12 season ====
Courtois made his debut for Atlético in a 4–0 UEFA Europa League victory over Vitória de Guimarães on 25 August, and three days later kept a clean sheet on his La Liga debut, a goalless draw against Osasuna at the Vicente Calderón Stadium. Courtois became first-choice goalkeeper over Sergio Asenjo, keeping four clean sheets in his first six La Liga games. On 26 November 2011, Courtois received his first red card of his professional career after fouling Real Madrid's Karim Benzema for a penalty in the Madrid derby. Cristiano Ronaldo put the penalty past substitute goalkeeper Asenjo as Atlético lost 1–4. Atlético reached the 2012 UEFA Europa League final, and Courtois kept a clean sheet as the club won 3–0 over fellow Spanish side Athletic Bilbao.

==== 2012–13 season ====
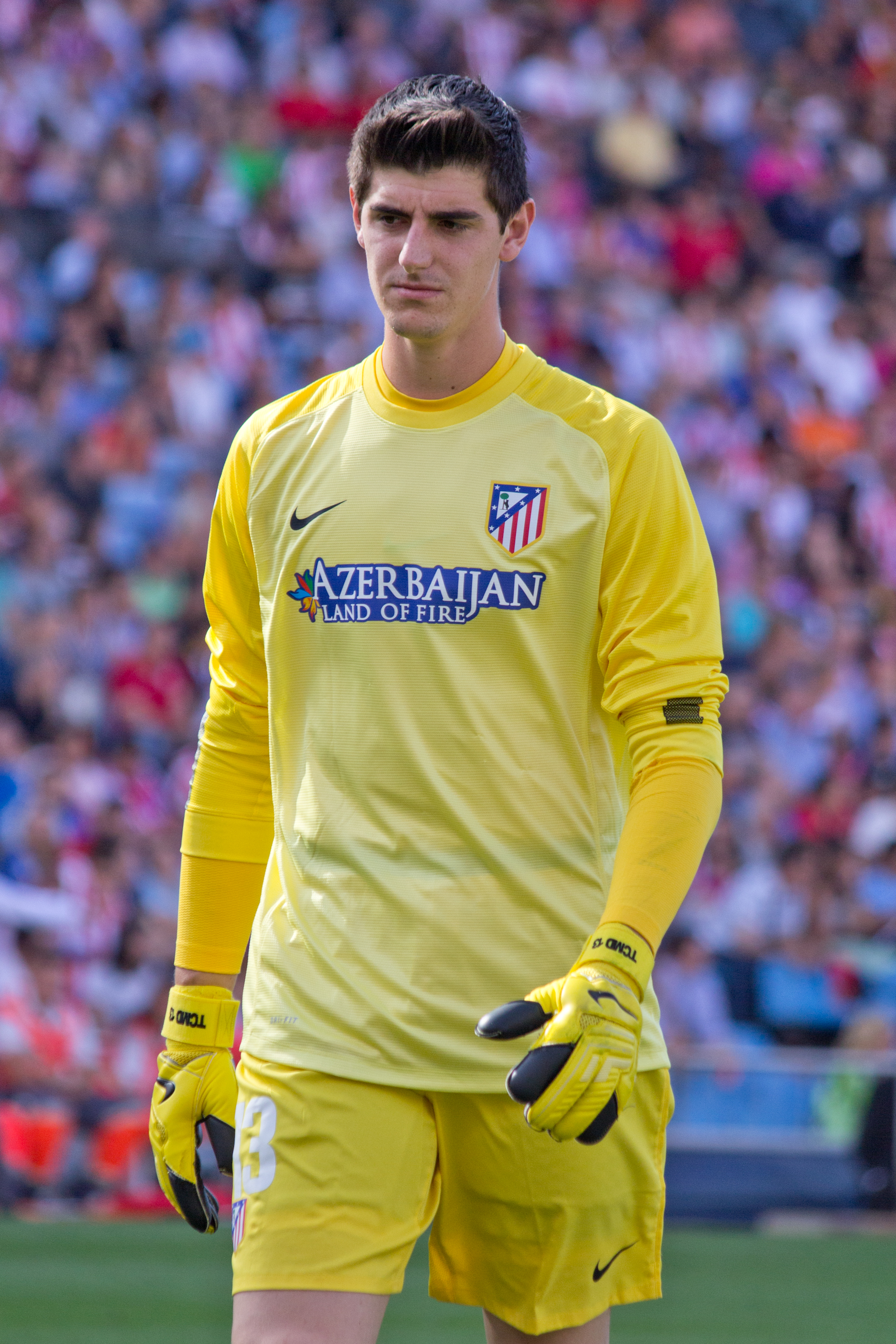
Courtois playing for Atlético Madrid in 2013

Courtois' loan to Atlético was extended to cover the 2012–13 season. His first game of the loan extension was against parent club Chelsea in the 2012 UEFA Super Cup in Monaco, which ended in a 4–1 victory for Atlético Madrid. Later in the season Courtois set a new Atlético Madrid record of 820 minutes without conceding a goal at the Estadio Vicente Calderon, ended by being beaten in a 1–0 loss to Real Sociedad. Atlético reached the 2013 Copa del Rey Final, and Courtois was named man of the match in a 2–1 victory against Real, the first time that Atlético had beaten their city rivals in 14 years.

==== 2013–14 season ====
For the 2013–14 season, Courtois' loan to Atlético was extended by a further 12 months.

When Atlético were drawn to play Chelsea in the Champions League semi-final, it was reported that a clause in Courtois' contract required Atlético to pay Chelsea €3 million per match if they selected him against his parent club, and that Atlético could not afford such a sum. UEFA made it clear that considerations of sporting integrity made such a clause "null, void and unenforceable", and confirmed that Atlético were free to select Courtois without making any such payment.

By conceding the fewest goals in a substantial number of matches during the 2013–14 season, Courtois won the Ricardo Zamora Trophy and made an important contribution to Atlético's 2013–14 La Liga title, their first since 1996. He was nominated for the La Liga Award for the best goalkeeper in the league, alongside Willy Caballero of Málaga and Keylor Navas of Levante, which Navas eventually won. Atlético, however, lost the UEFA Champions League final 4–1 after extra time against neighbours Real Madrid on 24 May in Lisbon.

=== Chelsea ===
==== 2014–15 season ====
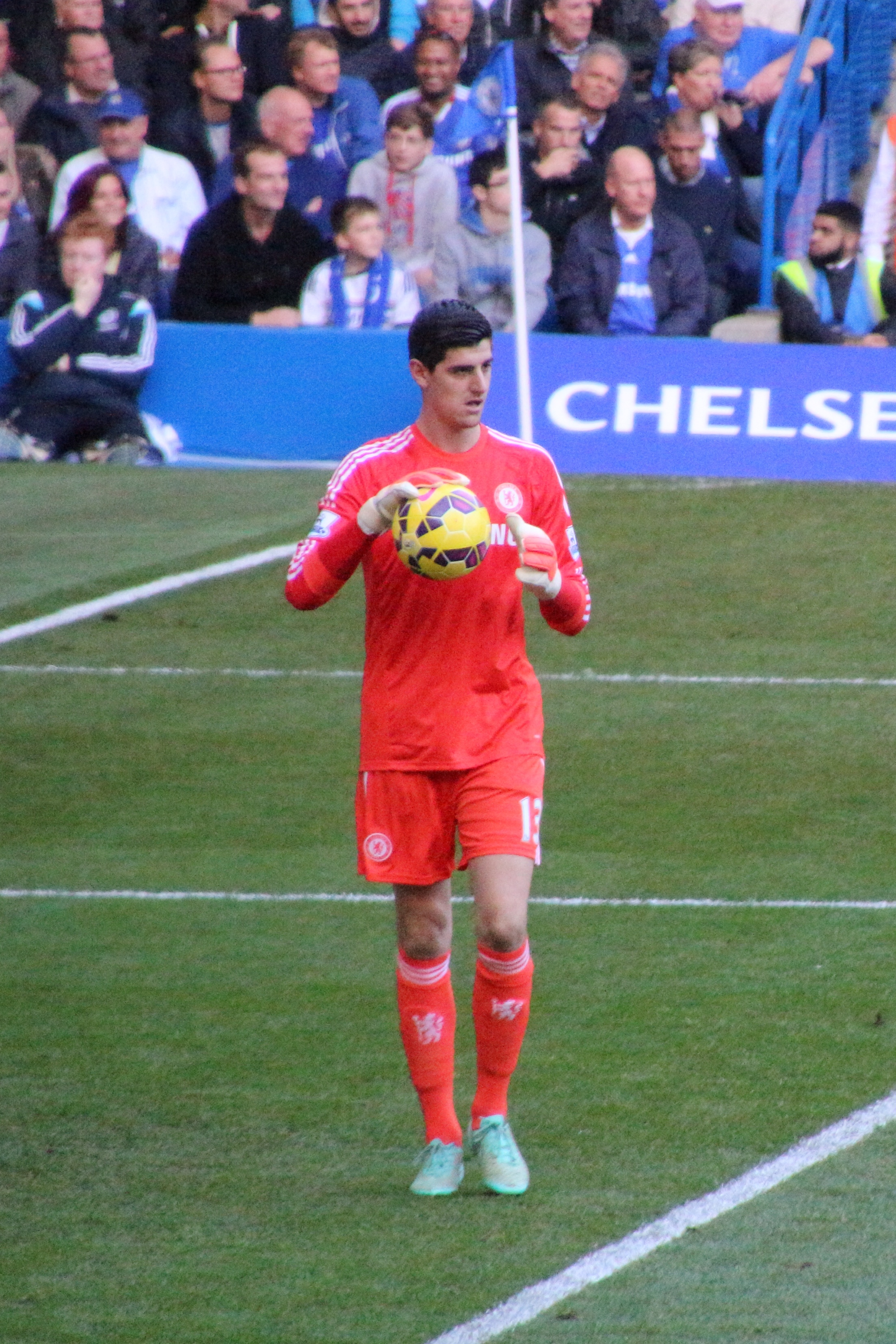
Courtois playing for Chelsea in 2014

In June 2014, Chelsea manager José Mourinho confirmed that Courtois would return to Chelsea for the upcoming season. He was assigned the number 13 shirt, last worn by Victor Moses. On 18 August, Mourinho announced that Courtois would start the Premier League opener against Burnley in place of Petr Čech. Although he conceded the first goal to Scott Arfield at Turf Moor, Chelsea won 3–1. Courtois kept his first Premier League clean sheet in his second game, making several crucial saves in a 2–0 home win over Leicester City.

On 11 September 2014, Courtois signed a new five-year contract with Chelsea, keeping him at the club until 2019. Upon signing, Courtois said: "It’s really nice to have signed this new contract for five years."

Courtois suffered a head injury in the first half of Chelsea's 2–0 home win over Arsenal on 5 October due to a collision with Alexis Sánchez; he was substituted and then taken to hospital. He was treated for a minor cut to his ear and released from hospital that night.

He won his first trophy with Chelsea on 1 March 2015, as they defeated Tottenham Hotspur 2–0 in the League Cup final, with Čech instead playing in that match; Chelsea also finished the season as league champions.

==== 2015–16 season ====
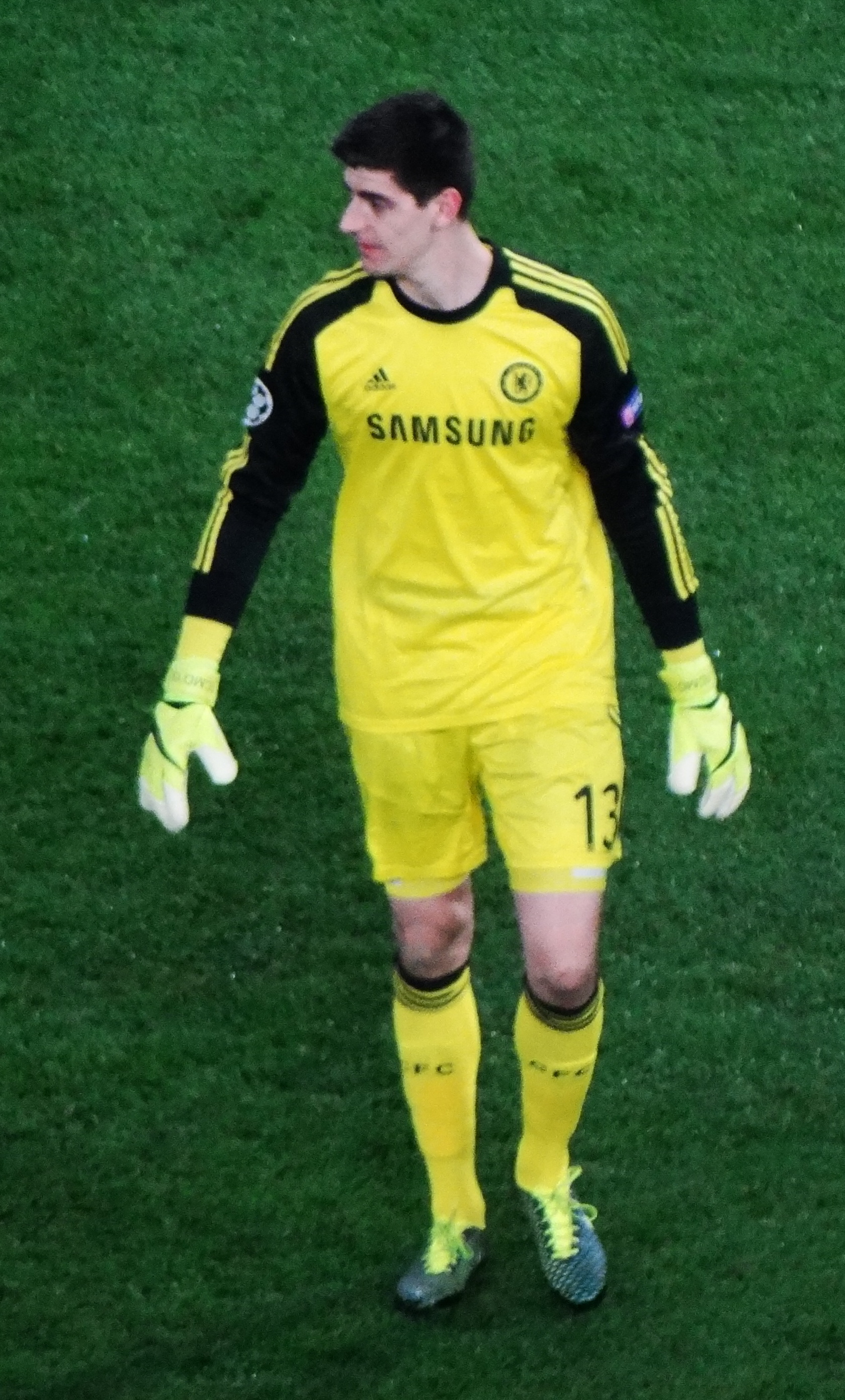
Courtois playing for Chelsea in 2015

Courtois opened the season by playing in the 2015 FA Community Shield on 2 August, a 1–0 loss to Arsenal. Six days later, as the Premier League campaign opened with a home fixture against Swansea City, he was given a straight red card for conceding a penalty with a foul on Bafétimbi Gomis, who converted the penalty past replacement Asmir Begović for a 2–2 draw. On his return on 23 August, Courtois saved a penalty from James Morrison in a 3–2 win at West Bromwich Albion. Courtois suffered a leg injury in training on 11 September which required surgery and meant that he was expected to miss the next three months of competition.

On 16 April, he was sent off at home to Manchester City for conceding a penalty with a foul on Fernandinho; Sergio Agüero converted it past Begović to seal a 3–0 win. He became the sixth Premier League goalkeeper to be sent off twice in the same season.

==== 2016–17 season ====
On 17 August 2016, Courtois dismissed any transfer rumours and stated he would stay at Chelsea for many years to come. Ten days later in the 3–0 home victory over Burnley, Courtois kept the first clean sheet of the season and broke a run of thirteen home Premier League games without a clean sheet since November 2015. From 1 October to 20 November, Chelsea earned a run of six games without conceding a single goal; with Courtois playing in all six of them. From 11 to 26 December, Courtois kept four clean sheets, as Chelsea were at the top of table in time for Christmas.

In April 2017, Courtois was ruled out for the match against rivals Manchester United, as a result of suffering a reported ankle injury, which he sustained in training. Chelsea would go on to lose the match 0–2. On 12 May 2017, Courtois kept his third consecutive clean sheet in a 1–0 away win over West Bromwich Albion, in which Chelsea secured the title. Courtois also played for Chelsea in the FA Cup final; which Chelsea lost 2–1 to Arsenal.

Courtois kept a total of 16 clean sheets in the Premier League and won the Golden Glove.

=== Real Madrid ===
==== 2018–2020 ====
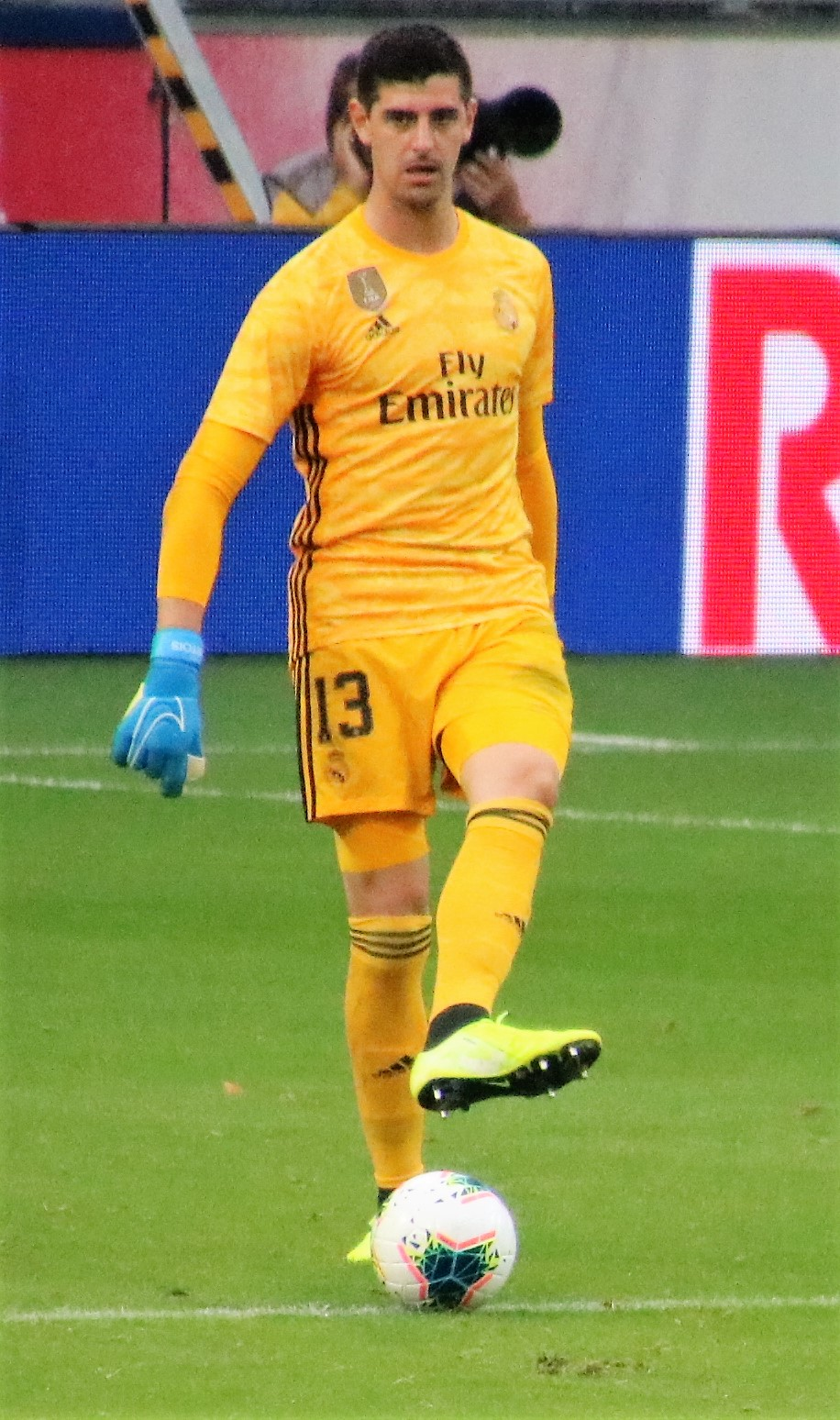
Courtois playing for Real Madrid in 2019

Following the 2017–18 season, Courtois mentioned he would want to live closer to his children, reigniting the rumours about a transfer to Real Madrid. After a strong performance at the 2018 FIFA World Cup, where he won the Golden Glove for best goalkeeper, Courtois expressed his interest in moving on. Chelsea stated they would not let him go unless they were able to find a replacement for him. Courtois responded by not showing up for training after the summer break, trying to force his exit from Chelsea. On 8 August 2018, Real Madrid announced that they had signed Courtois on a six-year contract. A day later, Chelsea confirmed the transfer for a fee believed to be £35 million.

He made his debut for Madrid on 1 September 2018, where he started in a 4–1 win over Leganés.

On 12 January 2020, Real Madrid beat Courtois' former club Atlético Madrid in a penalty shootout to win their eleventh Supercopa de España title. In the shootout, Saul saw his spot-kick hit the post before Thomas' effort was saved by Courtois, giving Ramos the chance to secure Real's 11th Spanish Super Cup triumph.

On 5 July 2020, Courtois kept his 17th clean sheet of the 2019–20 La Liga season in a 1–0 away win over Athletic Bilbao, becoming the first Real Madrid goalkeeper to do so in a single season since Francisco Buyo in 1994–95. He was the undisputed starter during the league season, as Real Madrid won the La Liga, becoming the first player since José Luis Pérez-Payá in 1954 to be crowned champion with both Real Madrid and Atlético Madrid. He won the Zamora Trophy for the third time in his career, after conceding just 20 goals in 34 matches.

==== 2021–present ====
On 16 August 2021, Courtois signed a new four-year contract, running until 2026. On 6 February 2022, he reached his 100th win with Real Madrid in 161 appearances, in a 1–0 victory over Granada. Courtois won his second Spanish title with Real Madrid in the 2021–22 La Liga season.

On 28 May 2022, Courtois was named player of the match in the 2022 UEFA Champions League final, where he managed to make a total of nine saves, which helped Real Madrid to beat Liverpool 1–0. Courtois' nine saves are a record in the final since Opta began keeping records in 2003–04. His 59 saves during the campaign also set a new Champions League single-season record since Opta began keeping records.

"He is so good that I sometimes asked him in training to deliberately let a few balls through, so that the attackers would have a bit more confidence."

— Former Real Madrid manager Carlo Ancelotti in November 2025, describing Courtois

On 10 August 2023, Real Madrid announced that Courtois was diagnosed with a torn anterior cruciate ligament in his left knee. He was scheduled to undergo surgery in the coming days, and could be out for several months.

On 19 March 2024, Courtois was injured again during a training session, sustaining a meniscus tear in his right knee. The recovery time was estimated at around two months, effectively ruling him out for the majority of the 2023–24 season. Two months later, on 4 May, Courtois made his first appearance in the season, playing full-time in 3–0 home win against Cádiz. Later on, on 1 June, he started in the Champions League final, producing multiple saves in a 2–0 victory over Borussia Dortmund.

During a match against Atlético Madrid in September 2024, Atlético fans threw objects at Courtois shortly after Éder Militão put Real Madrid 1–0 up in the 64th minute. The game was eventually suspended for about 15–20 minutes.

On 14 February 2026, Courtois reached his 150th La Liga victory with the club in a 4–1 win over Real Sociedad. A month later, on 11 March, he provided an assist in a 3–0 win over Manchester City in the Champions League round of 16, recording his third assist in the competition and breaking the previous record for goalkeeper assists, which had been jointly held by José Francisco Molina and Oliver Kahn. A week later, he sustained a thigh injury against the same opponent, forcing him to miss both quarter-final matches against Bayern Munich. Later that year, on 8 September, he made his 100th Champions League appearance in a 2–1 victory over Inter Milan.

On 20 November 2026, Courtois extended his contract until 2028.

== International career ==
=== Early career ===
Courtois was first called up to the Belgium squad in October 2011, and made his debut the following month in a friendly 0–0 draw against France at the Stade de France, making him the youngest goalkeeper to play for the Belgian national team since Robert Hustin in 1905.

=== 2014 World Cup ===
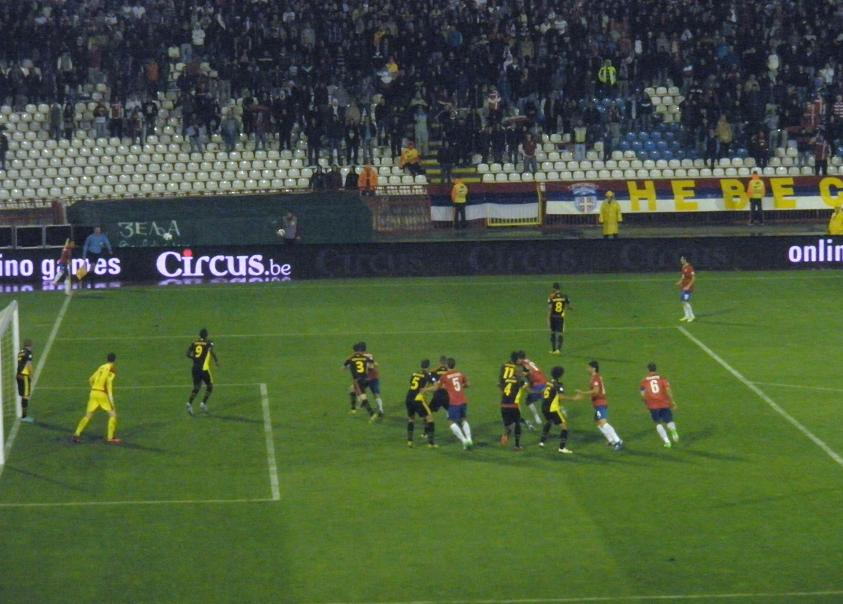
Courtois (in yellow) and Belgium defending against a Serbian corner during a 2014 FIFA World Cup qualifier in 2012

Courtois played every minute during the 2014 FIFA World Cup qualification campaign, as Belgium qualified for its first major tournament since the 2002 FIFA World Cup. Throughout these qualifiers, he kept six clean sheets in ten matches.

On 13 May 2014, Courtois was named in the squad to go to the 2014 FIFA World Cup. At the tournament, he played all five games of the Belgian team, starting with a 2–1 win against Algeria in Belo Horizonte. Courtois then managed to keep consecutive clean sheets in 1–0 wins against Russia and South Korea as the Red Devils reached the quarter-finals, where Argentina eliminated Belgium with Gonzalo Higuaín scoring the only goal of the match in the eighth minute.

=== Euro 2016 ===
Courtois played every minute during Belgium's first eight games of their UEFA Euro 2016 qualification campaign, helping seal qualification for the first time in 16 years. However, he missed their last two games due to injury.

Courtois and his side made it to the quarter-finals of Euro 2016, where they lost to Wales despite taking an early lead. Afterwards, Courtois hinted that Belgium coach Marc Wilmots was at fault for the loss and also stated that the defeat was the "biggest disappointment" of his career.

=== 2018 World Cup ===
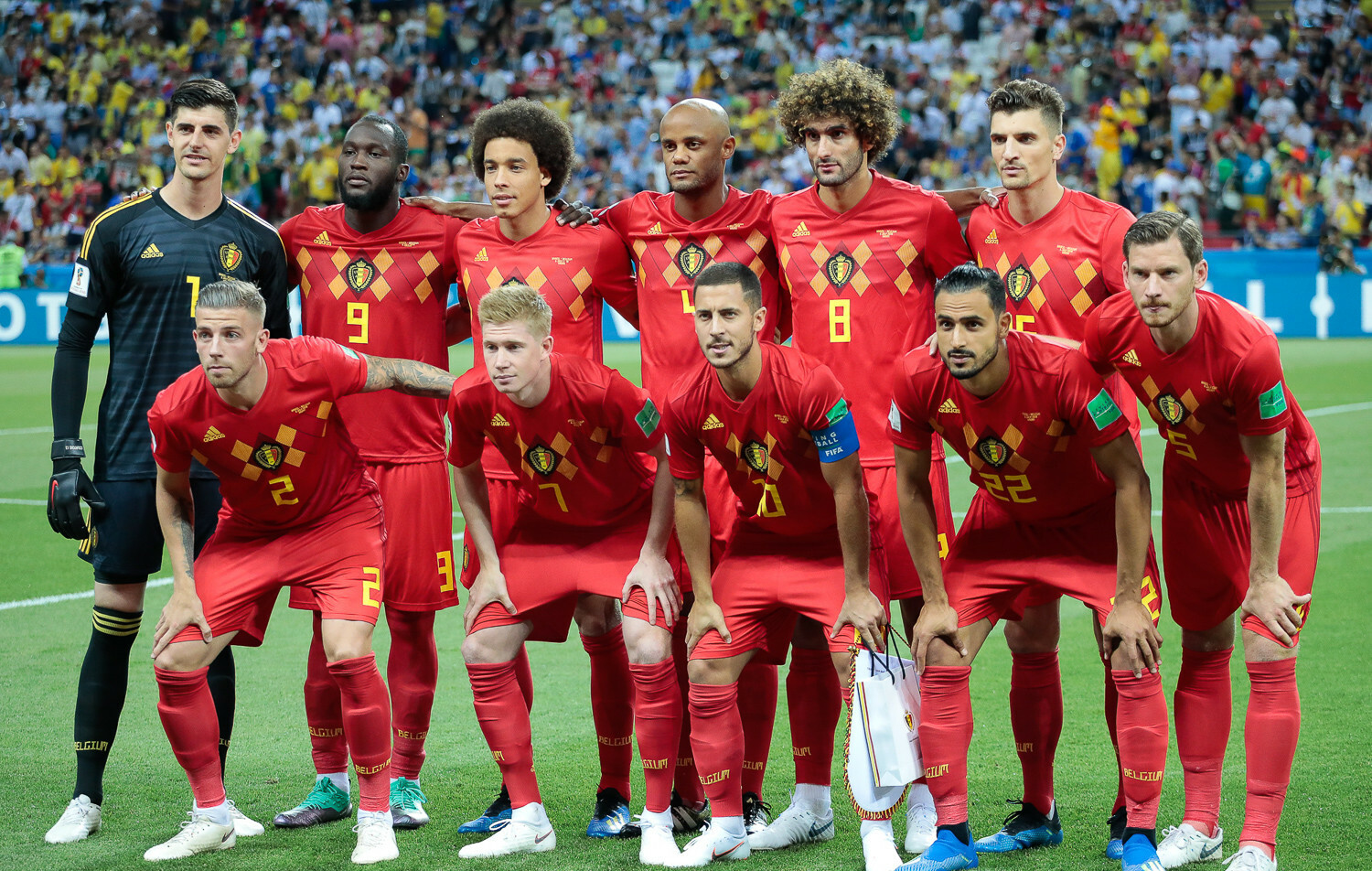
Courtois (in black) with Belgium at the 2018 FIFA World Cup

Courtois was selected to Belgium's final 23-man squad for the 2018 FIFA World Cup. He was Belgium's first-choice goalkeeper throughout the tournament, and played a key role in Belgium's 2–1 win over Brazil in the quarter-final, which saw Belgium advance to the semi-finals of the tournament for the first time since 1986. He posted two clean sheets in the group stage (against Panama and England), allowed only one goal in Belgium's loss to eventual champion France in the semi-final, and posted another clean sheet against England in the third place game. Courtois made 27 saves in seven World Cup games, more than any other goalkeeper. He was awarded the Golden Glove as best goalkeeper of the tournament.

=== Euro 2020 ===
On 17 May 2021, he was selected to the final squad for the delayed UEFA Euro 2020, where they lost to eventual champions Italy in the quarter-finals.

=== 2022 World Cup ===
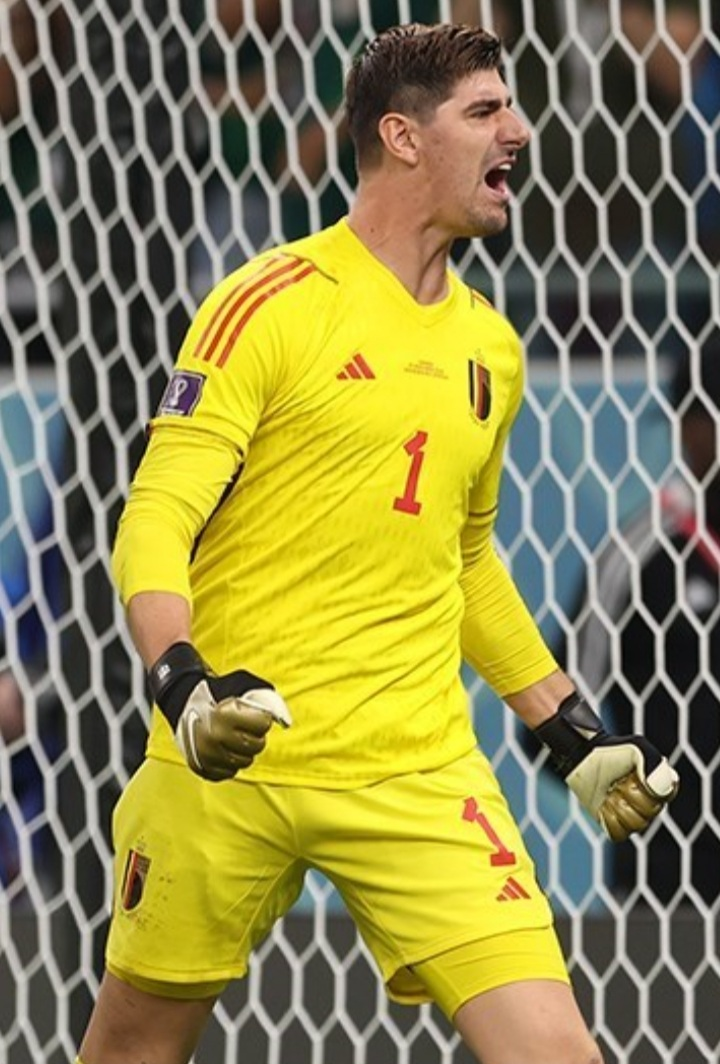
Courtois playing for Belgium at the 2022 FIFA World Cup

In November 2022, he was named in the final squad for the 2022 FIFA World Cup in Qatar. On 1 December, he played his 100th match for Belgium in a goalless draw against Croatia, becoming the first Belgian goalkeeper to achieve this feat. Despite this Belgium exited at the group stage.

=== UEFA Euro 2024 omission ===
Courtois played in two of Belgium's qualifying matches for the UEFA Euro 2024. He suffered a torn anterior cruciate ligament in August 2023, ruling him out for numerous months. Despite recovering from his injury and helping Real Madrid win the UEFA Champions League, he was not selected for the Euros. An underlying conflict between Belgium manager Domenico Tedesco and Courtois wasn't resolved, after they clashed when Courtois was not named Belgium's captain during a Euro 2024 qualifier against Austria. Eventually, Courtois announced he would not be part of Belgium's squad for the 2024 tournament. This was later confirmed by Tedesco in April 2024.

On 22 August 2024, Courtois announced that he would not return to the national team for the time being, citing the conflict with Tedesco as the main reason.

=== Return to the team ===
Courtois playing for Belgium during the 2026 FIFA World Cup

On 10 March 2025, Courtois returned to the national team under new manager Rudi Garcia, following Tedesco's dismissal as manager in January. Courtois's accepted return caused another one of Belgium's goalkeepers Koen Casteels to quit the national team in frustration. Courtois made his first appearance for Belgium in almost two years on 20 March in a UEFA Nations League match against Ukraine, where they lost 3–1.

On 15 May 2026, he was named in Belgium's squad for the 2026 FIFA World Cup. He made his 17th FIFA World Cup appearance in a goalless draw with Iran, equaling Enzo Scifo's record for the most World Cup appearances by a Belgian player. He surpassed the previous record during a 5–1 victory over New Zealand. In the quarterfinal against Spain, he sustained an injury and was replaced by Senne Lammens with the score level at 1–1. However, a goalkeeping error from Lammens later allowed Spain to score and secure a 2–1 victory. Regardless, Courtois had made his 21st World Cup appearance, becoming the goalkeeper with the second-most appearances in the tournament, behind only Manuel Neuer.

== Style of play ==
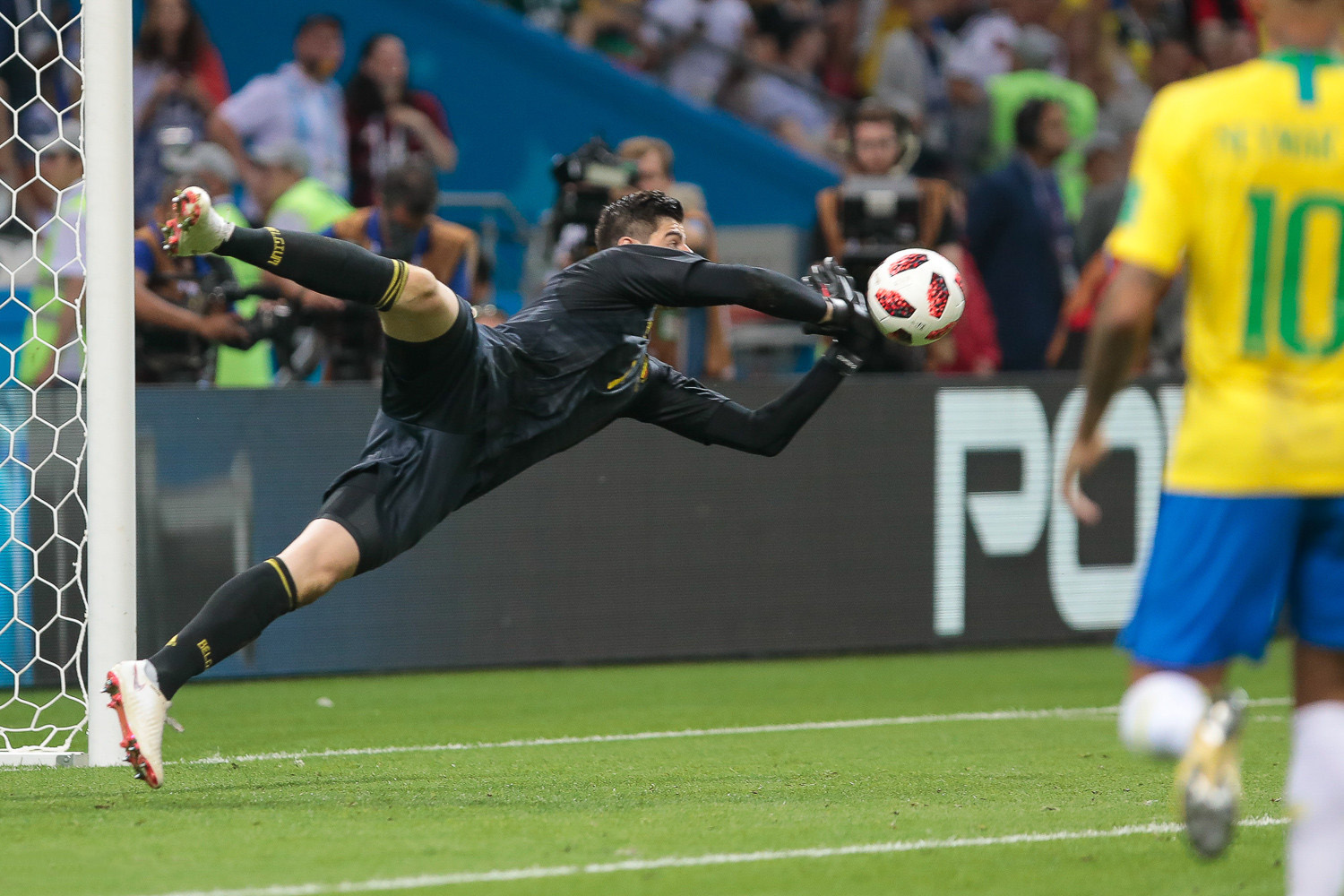
Courtois making a save during the 2018 FIFA World Cup quarter-final match against Brazil, which Belgium won 2–1

Considered a highly promising prospect in his youth, Courtois subsequently established himself as one of the best players in the world in his position. Due to his wide range of skills, he has been described as a "complete goalkeeper", with few weaknesses. A consistent keeper, he possesses an excellent positional sense, good mentality, composure, strength of character, and an ability to communicate well with his defenders; he also excels in one on one situations, due to his ability to time his runs effectively when rushing out of goal to face opponents, and has even functioned as a sweeper-keeper on occasion. An excellent shot-stopper between the posts, he has also distinguished himself for his agility and quick reflexes, in spite of his size and imposing physique. During the 2016–17 season, he credited his goalkeeping coach with Chelsea under manager Antonio Conte, Gianluca Spinelli, for helping him to improve his overall game and goalkeeping technique, in particular his foot-work and diving, which enabled him to be more explosive and get to ground more quickly. Due to his height and reach, he excels in the air, and is also known for his command of his area, as well as his excellent technique, anticipation, handling, and confidence when coming off his line to claim crosses. Moreover, he is known for his ability to distribute the ball to his teammates with long throws. In 2025, Amanda Langell of Sports Illustrated placed Courtois at number 13 in her list of the 15 greatest goalkeepers of all time.

== Outside football ==
=== Personal life ===
Courtois speaks both French and Dutch, as well as Spanish and English. Thibaut's older sister Valérie Courtois is a volleyball player who plays as a libero for Stade Français Paris Saint Cloud and Belgium. His parents were volleyball players, and he played the sport in his childhood but decided to focus on football when he was 12.

On 26 May 2015, his Spanish girlfriend Marta Domínguez gave birth to their daughter. The couple ended their relationship in April 2017 while Domínguez was pregnant with their son who was born a month later.

He began a relationship with Israeli model Mishel Gerzig in July 2021. They adopted a dog together a month later. In June 2022, they got engaged. They got married a year later.

=== In popular culture ===
Inspired by Courtois' pose from a particular save in January 2013, a Colombian fan created a new widespread social media meme called 'Thibauting' to pay homage to the Belgian goalkeeper. In November 2013, the word was included in a shortlist composed by leading Dutch dictionary Van Dale to be polled to determine the best new sports/amusement word of the year in Belgium, and ended second. The term is based on and pronounced the same way as "Tebowing", and is also similar to the worldwide 'planking' meme which was popular in 2011.

=== Racing ===
Outside football, Courtois has been said to maintain an interest in Formula 1, previously attending the Monaco and Spanish Grand Prix.

In 2021, Courtois participated in the 2021 F1 Virtual Grand Prix championship as an Alfa Romeo driver.

In May 2023, Courtois created his own Formula 4 team, TC Racing, with the intention of entering it into the F4 Spanish Championship. The team is based south of Madrid and was given official approval to compete in Spanish F4 in November 2023. Courtois holds an administrative role within the team and hired Roberto Merhi as sporting director and driver coach. The team made its official debut in May 2024.

In November 2024, Courtois announced the creation of TC Esports, a sim racing team. TC Esports was announced as a new team participating in the 2026 eNASCAR Coca-Cola iRacing Championship Series.

=== Club ownership ===
In February 2026, Courtois invested in the Brazilian fund Outfield through his investment company NxtPlay, which subsequently became the majority shareholder of French club Le Mans. In May of the same year, NxtPlay and Courtois became co-owners of Spanish club Extremadura. On 1 June 2026, he invested in his homegrown club, Genk, by acquiring a minority ownership stake through NxtPlay.

== Career statistics ==
=== Club ===
As of match played 21 November 2026

Appearances and goals by club, season and competition
Club	Season	League			National cup (Note: Includes Belgian Cup, Copa del Rey, FA Cup)		League cup (Note: Includes Football League/EFL Cup)		Europe		Other		Total	
Club	Season	Division	Apps	Goals	Apps	Goals	Apps	Goals	Apps	Goals	Apps	Goals	Apps	Goals
Genk	2008–09	Belgian First Division	1	0	0	0	—		—		—		1	0
Genk	2009–10	Belgian Pro League	0	0	0	0	—		0	0	0	0	0	0
Genk	2010–11	Belgian Pro League	40	0	1	0	—		3 (Note: Appearances in UEFA Europa League)	0	—		44	0
Genk	Total		41	0	1	0	—		3	0	0	0	45	0
Atlético Madrid (loan)	2011–12	La Liga	37	0	0	0	—		15	0	—		52	0
Atlético Madrid (loan)	2012–13	La Liga	37	0	8	0	—		0	0	1 (Note: Appearance in UEFA Super Cup)	0	46	0
Atlético Madrid (loan)	2013–14	La Liga	37	0	5	0	—		12 (Note: Appearance(s) in UEFA Champions League)	0	2 (Note: Appearance(s) in Supercopa de España)	0	56	0
Atlético Madrid (loan)	Total		111	0	13	0	—		27	0	3	0	154	0
Chelsea	2014–15	Premier League	32	0	0	0	2	0	5	0	—		39	0
Chelsea	2015–16	Premier League	23	0	3	0	0	0	3	0	1 (Note: Appearance in FA Community Shield)	0	30	0
Chelsea	2016–17	Premier League	36	0	3	0	0	0	—		—		39	0
Chelsea	2017–18	Premier League	35	0	1	0	1	0	8	0	1	0	46	0
Chelsea	Total		126	0	7	0	3	0	16	0	2	0	154	0
Real Madrid	2018–19	La Liga	27	0	1	0	—		5	0	2 (Note: Appearances in FIFA Club World Cup)	0	35	0
Real Madrid	2019–20	La Liga	34	0	0	0	—		7	0	2	0	43	0
Real Madrid	2020–21	La Liga	38	0	0	0	—		12	0	1	0	51	0
Real Madrid	2021–22	La Liga	36	0	1	0	—		13	0	2	0	52	0
Real Madrid	2022–23	La Liga	31	0	5	0	—		10	0	3 (Note: One appearance in UEFA Super Cup, two appearances in Supercopa de España)	0	49	0
Real Madrid	2023–24	La Liga	4	0	0	0	—		1	0	0	0	5	0
Real Madrid	2024–25	La Liga	30	0	1	0	—		12	0	10 (Note: One appearance in UEFA Super Cup, one appearance in FIFA Intercontinental Cup, two appearances in Supercopa de España, six appearances in FIFA Club World Cup)	0	53	0
Real Madrid	2025–26	La Liga	32	0	0	0	—		11	0	2	0	45	0
Real Madrid	2026–27	La Liga	12	0	0	0	—		4	0	0	0	16	0
Real Madrid	Total		244	0	8	0	—		75	0	22	0	349	0
Career total			522	0	29	0	3	0	121	0	27	0	705	0

=== International ===
As of match played 10 July 2026

Appearances and goals by national team and year
National team	Year	Apps	Goals
Belgium	2011	1	0
Belgium	2012	6	0
Belgium	2013	7	0
Belgium	2014	13	0
Belgium	2015	6	0
Belgium	2016	14	0
Belgium	2017	8	0
Belgium	2018	15	0
Belgium	2019	9	0
Belgium	2020	2	0
Belgium	2021	13	0
Belgium	2022	6	0
Belgium	2023	2	0
Belgium	2024	0	0
Belgium	2025	5	0
Belgium	2026	8	0
Total		115	0

== Honours ==
Genk

- Belgian Pro League: 2010–11

Atlético Madrid

- La Liga: 2013–14
- Copa del Rey: 2012–13
- UEFA Europa League: 2011–12
- UEFA Super Cup: 2012

Chelsea

- Premier League: 2014–15, 2016–17
- FA Cup: 2017–18; runner-up: 2016–17
- Football League Cup: 2014–15

Real Madrid

- La Liga: 2019–20, 2021–22, 2023–24
- Copa del Rey: 2022–23
- Supercopa de España: 2020, 2022
- UEFA Champions League: 2021–22, 2023–24
- UEFA Super Cup: 2022, 2024
- FIFA Club World Cup: 2018
- FIFA Intercontinental Cup: 2024

Belgium

- FIFA World Cup third place: 2018

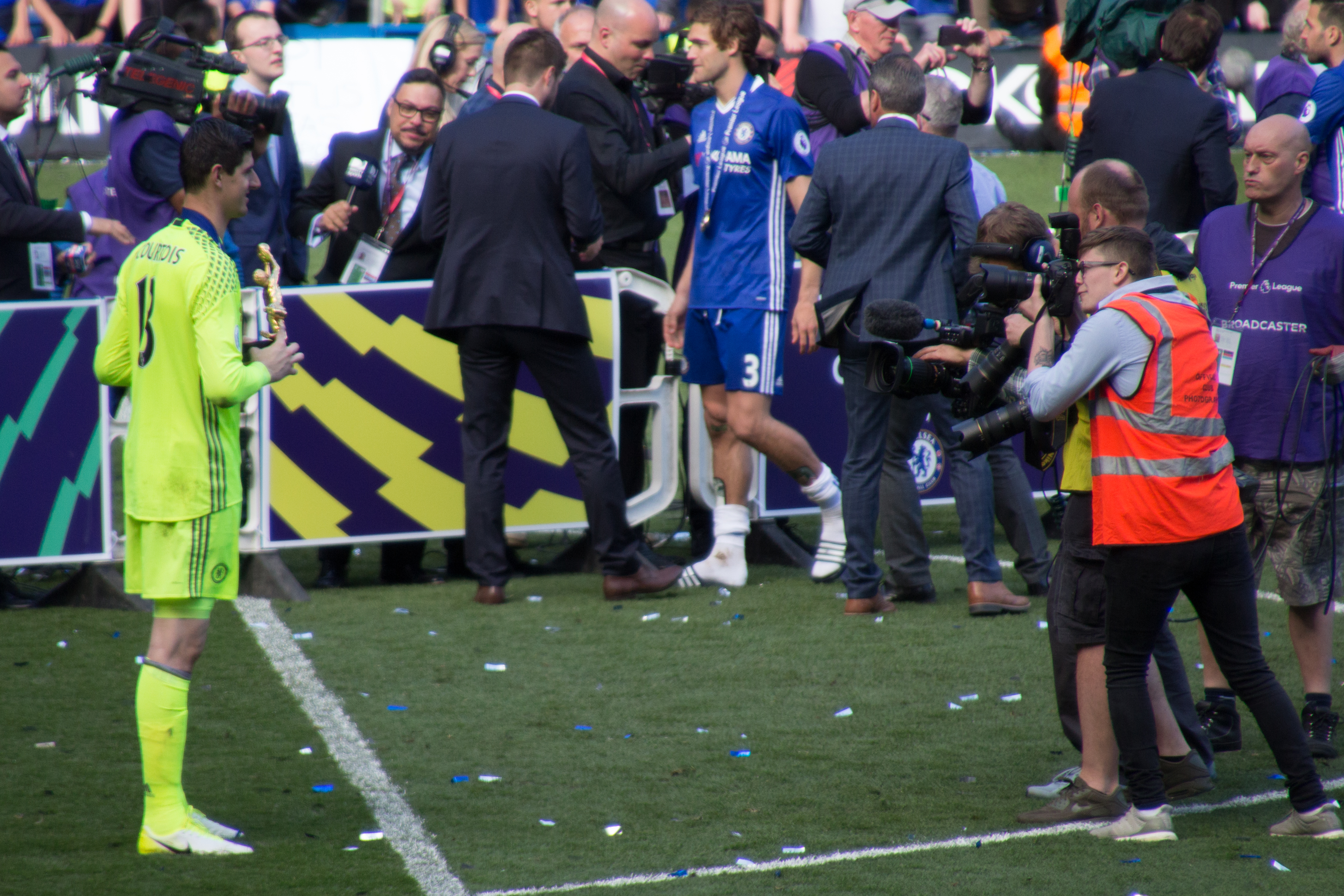
Courtois (left) receiving the Premier League Golden Glove award in 2017

Individual

- Belgian Professional Goalkeeper of the Year: 2011
- Belgian Bronze Shoe: 2011
- La Liga Zamora Trophy: 2012–13, 2013–14, 2019–20
- La Liga Goalkeeper of the Season: 2012–13
- Best Belgian Player Abroad: 2013, 2014
- ESM Team of the Year: 2013–14, 2021–22
- UEFA Champions League Squad of the Season: 2013–14, 2020–21
- UEFA Champions League Team of the Season: 2021–22, 2022–23
- Belgian Sportsman of the year: 2014
- Premier League Golden Glove: 2016–17
- FIFA World Cup Golden Glove: 2018
- FIFA World Cup Fantasy Team: 2018
- FIFA World Cup Dream Team: 2018
- The Best FIFA Goalkeeper: 2018
- IFFHS World's Best Goalkeeper: 2018, 2022
- IFFHS Men's World Team: 2018, 2022
- La Liga Player of the Month: January 2020, February 2022
- La Liga Team of the Season: 2013–14, 2021–22, 2024–25, 2025–26
- FIFPRO World 11: 2022, 2023
- Yashin Trophy: 2022
- Globe Soccer Career Award: 2024
- The Athletic European Men's Team of the Season: 2024–25

== See also ==
- List of men's footballers with 100 or more international caps
