= 1959–60 Copa del Generalísimo =

58th Copa del Rey

Tournament details
- Country: Spain
- Teams: 48

Final positions
- Champions: Club Atlético de Madrid (1st title)
- Runners-up: Real Madrid

Tournament statistics
- Matches played: 102

The 1959–60 Copa del Generalísimo was the 58th staging of the Spanish Cup. The competition began on 22 November 1959 and ended on 26 June 1960 with the final.

== First round ==
Team 1	Agg.	Team 2	1st leg	2nd leg
CD Alavés	5–5	Club Atlético de Ceuta	5–2	0–3
Club Atlético de Almería	2–4	Deportivo La Coruña	2–1	0–3
Real Avilés CF	1–4	AD Plus Ultra	0–1	1–3
Baracaldo CF	3–0	CD Mestalla	2–0	1–0
CD Basconia	0–3	Real Murcia CF	0–0	0–3
Cádiz CF	3–5	CD Sabadell	3–0	0–5
RC Celta	1–4	Córdoba CF	0–1	1–3
CF Extremadura	3–3	Cultural y Deportiva Leonesa	3–1	0–2
Club Ferrol	4–1	CD Tenerife	3–0	1–1
Recreativo Huelva	2–2	Sestao SC	1–1	1–1
SD Indauchu	6–3	Real Jaén CF	6–0	0–3
Levante UD	1–10	Real Gijón	0–1	1–9
RCD Mallorca	4–1	CD Condal	3–0	1–1
Real Santander SD	1–1	CD San Fernando	1–1	0–0
Tarrasa CF	4–2	CD Badajoz	4–0	0–2
AD Rayo Vallecano	5–8	CD Orense	2–3	3–5

Source: RSSSF

- Tiebreaker

Team 1	Score	Team 2
CD Alavés	0–1	Club Atlético de Ceuta
CF Extremadura	0–2	Cultural y Deportiva Leonesa
Recreativo Huelva	2–1	Sestao SC
Real Santander SD	1–1	CD San Fernando
Real Santander SD	1–2	CD San Fernando

== Round of 32 ==
Team 1	Agg.	Team 2	1st leg	2nd leg
Club Atlético de Ceuta	1–3	Real Oviedo CF	0–0	1–3
CF Barcelona	10–2	Club Ferrol	7–1	3–1
Córdoba CF	7–3	Real Zaragoza CD	6–1	1–2
Deportivo La Coruña	3–7	Club Atlético de Bilbao	3–2	0–5
Elche CF	4–3	CD San Fernando	4–2	0–1
UD Las Palmas	0–2	Cultural y Deportiva Leonesa	0–0	0–2
CD Orense	3–2	RCD Español	2–0	1–2
AD Plus Ultra	2–4	Real Betis Balompié	1–2	1–2
Real Madrid CF	4–1	Baracaldo CF	3–0	1–1
Real Sociedad	7–2	SD Indauchu	4–0	3–2
Recreativo Huelva	2–2	Granada CF	1–0	1–2
CD Sabadell	0–5	Club Atlético de Madrid	0–1	0–4
Sevilla CF	1–3	Real Gijón	1–0	0–3
Tarrasa CF	3–2	CA Osasuna	3–1	0–1
Valencia CF	2–1	Real Murcia CF	2–0	0–1
Real Valladolid Deportivo	1–3	RCD Mallorca	0–2	1–1

Source: RSSSF

- Tiebreaker

Team 1	Score	Team 2
Recreativo Huelva	2–1	Granada CF

== Round of 16 ==
Team 1	Agg.	Team 2	1st leg	2nd leg
CF Barcelona	6–3	Tarrasa CF	4–2	2–1
Córdoba CF	3–8	Club Atlético de Madrid	1–3	2–5
Elche CF	6–6	Real Betis Balompié	4–4	2–2
Real Gijón	3–2	Recreativo de Huelva	2–0	1–2
RCD Mallorca	3–1	Real Sociedad	0–0	3–1
CD Orense	4–4	Club Atlético de Bilbao	3–1	1–3
Real Madrid CF	9–0	Cultural y Deportiva Leonesa	5–0	4–0
Valencia CF	6–3	Real Oviedo CF	3–1	1–0

Source: RSSSF

- Tiebreaker

Team 1	Score	Team 2
Elche CF	6–4	Real Betis Balompié
CD Orense	1–2	Club Atlético de Bilbao

== Quarter-finals ==
Team 1	Agg.	Team 2	1st leg	2nd leg
CF Barcelona	3–4	Club Atlético de Bilbao	3–1	0–3
Elche CF	2–0	RCD Mallorca	1–0	1–0
Real Madrid CF	13–1	Real Gijón	8–0	5–1
Valencia CF	1–5	Club Atlético de Madrid	0–1	1–4

Source: RSSSF

== Semi-finals ==
Team 1	Agg.	Team 2	1st leg	2nd leg
Club Atlético de Bilbao	4–8	Real Madrid CF	3–0	1–8
Club Atlético de Madrid	9–2	Elche CF	8–0	1–2

Source: RSSSF

== Final ==
Team 1	Score	Team 2
Club Atlético de Madrid	3–1	Real Madrid CF

Copa del Generalísimo
winners
Club Atlético de Madrid
1st title
