= 1960–61 Copa del Generalísimo =

59th Copa del Rey

Tournament details
- Country: Spain
- Teams: 48

Final positions
- Champions: Atlético Madrid (2nd title)
- Runners-up: Real Madrid

Tournament statistics
- Matches played: 104

The 1960–61 Copa del Generalísimo was the 59th staging of the Spanish Cup. The competition began on 12 October 1960 and concluded on 2 July 1961 with the final.

== First round ==
Team 1	Agg.	Team 2	1st leg	2nd leg
CD Castellón	4–4	Pontevedra CF	3–0	1–4
Celta Vigo	6–2	CA Ceuta	4–0	2–2
Córdoba CF	12–6	San Sebastián CF	9–3	3–3
Deportivo La Coruña	6–4	Levante UD	4–1	2–3
CF Extremadura	2–11	CA Osasuna	2–0	0–11
Real Gijón	4–4	Cádiz CF	4–2	0–2
Hércules CF	4–4	CD Basconia	4–0	0–4
SD Indauchu	1–5	UD Las Palmas	1–3	0–2
Real Jaén	1–3	CD Condal	1–1	0–2
CD Málaga	1–2	Baracaldo CF	1–0	0–2
CD Mestalla	4–3	Cultural Leonesa	2–1	2–2
AD Plus Ultra	1–2	CD Orense	1–1	0–1
CD Sabadell CF	1–2	Real Murcia	1–0	0–2
UD Salamanca	1–3	CD Tenerife	1–1	0–2
CD San Fernando	3–0	Tarrasa CF	3–0	0–0
Sestao SC	5–5	Rayo Vallecano	2–2	3–3

Source: RSSSF

- Tiebreaker

Team 1	Score	Team 2
CD Castellón	3–2	Pontevedra CF
Real Gijón	1–1	Cádiz CF
Real Gijón	3–2	Cádiz CF
Hércules CF	3–2	CD Basconia
Sestao SC	1–1	Rayo Vallecano
Sestao SC	0–2	Rayo Vallecano (Note: Sestao SC qualified by Rayo Vallecano's wrong line-up.)

== Round of 32 ==
Team 1	Agg.	Team 2	1st leg	2nd leg
Baracaldo CF	1–6	Real Oviedo	0–0	1–6
CF Barcelona	11–3	Real Gijón	7–1	4–2
Real Betis	3–1	Real Murcia	1–0	2–1
CD Condal	2–11	Sevilla CF	2–3	0–8
Córdoba CF	4–4	Real Santander	3–0	1–4
Granada CF	2–5	UD Las Palmas	2–0	0–5
Hércules CF	0–11	Real Madrid	0–5	0–6
RCD Mallorca	2–1	Sestao SC	1–0	1–1
Atlético Madrid	3–0	CD Mestalla	2–0	1–0
CA Osasuna	1–2	Club Atlético de Bilbao	1–0	0–2
Real Sociedad	5–3	Celta Vigo	4–1	1–2
CD San Fernando	0–1	RCD Español	0–0	0–1
CD Tenerife	3–1	Elche CF	3–0	0–1
Valencia CF	1–1	CD Castellón	1–1	0–0
Real Valladolid	5–1	CD Orense	5–0	0–1
Real Zaragoza	8–4	Deportivo La Coruña	5–1	3–3

Source: RSSSF

- Tiebreaker

Team 1	Score	Team 2
Córdoba CF	1–2	Real Santander
Valencia CF	5–0	CD Castellón

== Round of 16 ==
Team 1	Agg.	Team 2	1st leg	2nd leg
Club Atlético de Bilbao	5–2	Real Sociedad	3–1	2–1
Atlético Madrid	2–2	Valencia CF	2–0	0–2
CF Barcelona	3–5	RCD Español	2–3	1–2
Real Betis	4–1	Real Oviedo	3–1	1–0
UD Las Palmas	4–4	Real Valladolid	2–0	2–4
RCD Mallorca	3–4	Sevilla CF	2–0	1–4
Real Santander	1–4	Real Madrid	1–1	0–3
Real Zaragoza	1–1	CD Tenerife	1–0	0–1

Source: RSSSF

- Tiebreaker

Team 1	Score	Team 2
Atlético Madrid	3–0	Valencia CF
UD Las Palmas	1–2	Real Valladolid
Real Zaragoza	0–1	CD Tenerife

== Quarter-finals ==
Team 1	Agg.	Team 2	1st leg	2nd leg
Club Atlético de Bilbao	0–5	Real Madrid	0–2	0–3
Atlético Madrid	3–1	CD Tenerife	2–0	1–1
Real Betis	7–1	RCD Español	5–1	2–0
Real Valladolid	3–2	Sevilla CF	3–1	0–1

Source: RSSSF

== Semi-finals ==
Team 1	Agg.	Team 2	1st leg	2nd leg
Real Madrid	8–5	Real Betis	7–1	1–4
Real Valladolid	3–4	Atlético Madrid	3–1	0–3

Source: RSSSF

== Final ==
Team 1	Score	Team 2
Atlético Madrid	3–2	Real Madrid

Copa del Generalísimo
winners
Atlético Madrid
2nd title
