= Marisol Yagüe =

Spanish politician (born 1952)

Marisol Yagüe Reyes (born 1952) is a Spanish former politician. As a member of the Liberal Independent Group (GIL), she became the mayor of Marbella in 2003 following a motion of no confidence in Julián Muñoz. She was removed from office in 2006 due to being indicted in Operation Malaya, an anti-corruption investigation. In 2013 she was sentenced to six years in prison. In 2020, she was convicted of choosing her husband for a job in the council, and was disqualified from office for ten years.

== Biography ==
Yagüe was born in La Línea de la Concepción in Andalusia. As a member of mayor Jesús Gil's Liberal Independent Group (GIL), she was elected to the council in Marbella in 1995. On 13 August 2003, she became the first woman mayor of Marbella due to a motion of no confidence in GIL mayor Julián Muñoz, supported by eight GIL rebels and three councillors each of the Spanish Socialist Workers' Party (PSOE) and Andalusian Party (PA).

On 29 March 2006, Yagüe was one of twenty people arrested in Operation Malaya, an anti-corruption investigation centred on Marbella. Tomás Reñones, a former footballer for Gil's Atlético Madrid, took over as mayor. Days later, the Spanish government took the unprecedented step of dissolving the council and sending administrators to run the city.

In October 2013, Yagüe was sentenced to six years in jail and Muñoz to two. She was also fined €2.3 million. In January 2016, she entered the Prisión Provincial de Málaga to serve five-and-a-half years.

Yagüe was tried in October 2020 for having chosen her husband for a job in the council in 2003. She was charged with misconduct in public office and embezzlement, with the prosecution requesting five years in prison; the second charge was dropped and she was instead sentenced to ten years of disqualification from public office.
