= Marbella City Council dissolution =

2006 action of the Spanish government

City coat of arms
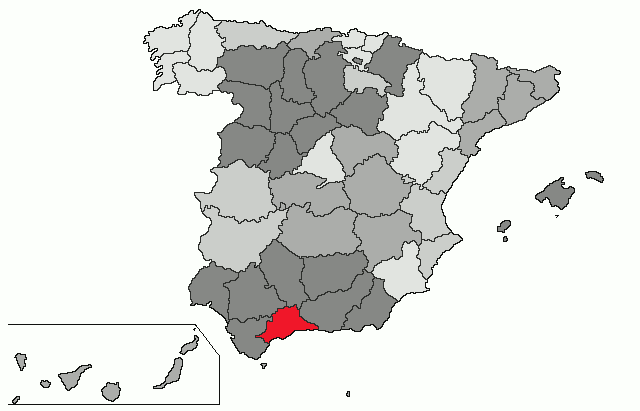

Marbella within Spain

The dissolution of the Marbella City Council on April 7, 2006, was an unprecedented move of the Spanish Government to put an end to the long-standing corruption in the city, which had taken the council near to its bankruptcy while many mayors and their collaborators had "earned" large amounts of unknown sourced-luxury.

== Causes ==
Many sources track the start of widespread corruption to the first term of Mayor Jesús Gil, elected in 1991 with 65% of the vote and a 19–6 majority for his Liberal Independent Group (GIL) party. His government promoted heavy urbanistic development throughout Marbella, revitalizing its hype amongst the world jet set and bringing an era of prosperity to the city. However, his open disregard for the Andalusian regulations and the still standing former urban plan made the Government of Andalusia start rejecting all his new plans. Moreover, he was soon accused of diverting public funds to his soccer club, Atlético Madrid, while international mafias greatly increased their activities in Marbella.

In the meantime, national parties the People's Party and Spanish Socialist Workers' Party (PSOE) seemed unable to convince voters of Gil's corruption, for he was returned in the 1995 election with the same result as in 1991; and even in the 1999 election, when the scandals had already started surfacing, he retained a 15-10 majority with 52% of the vote.

In 2002, Gil was jailed for public fund diversion to Atlético Madrid, and after his ban from public service, some proposed dissolving the whole council in response to the claims of deeply rooted corruption in Marbella, but José María Aznar's PP government was unwilling to use such a drastic reserve power for the first time in Spanish democracy against a council which would serve only one more year. On May 2, 2002, Deputy Mayor Julián Muñoz, already with some trials pending, replaced his boss as the city's first officer.

The corruption charges continued taking down many GIL politicians and collaborators, but the Marbellians seemed adamant of this, and they backed the GIL new head Muñoz with 47% of the vote in the 2003 election, still a majority of 15–12 due to the use of the D'Hondt method and the opposition fragmentation. However, the party was in turmoil and Muñoz proved unable to control the council: a severe floor crossing created more than four independent groups springing not only from the GIL but also from the PSOE and the Andalucist Party, and a vote of no confidence sacked the Mayor on August 13, 2003, putting Marisol Yagüe in his office barely three months after the election. Again, the PP government decided not to invoke the power of council dismissal to avoid PSOE and IU critics of authoritarianism.

Scandals were getting louder by the day, and on March 29 and 30, 2006, both Mayor Yagüe and Deputy Mayor Isabel García, along with urban development advisor Juan Antonio Roca and many councillors, were arrested on charges of public funds malversation, prevarication, bribery and traffic of influence. Second Deputy Mayor Tomás Reñones took office on April 1, but he already knew that the council was going to be dissolved. He tried to ease the situation putting all councillors' offices "at the disposition of superior institutions", but Manuel Chaves, the socialist president of Andalusia, declared that "the Andalusian Government was not a superior instance to the Marbellian Council", so they had no means to intervene but to advise the Spanish Government to dissolve the council.

== Legal background ==
Both the Andalusian and the Spanish governments based their actions on the Local Regime Framework Act, which defines the powers of not only the cities, but also many Constitution-created institutions, such as the provincial governments. The act clearly specifies, on its article 61.1, that

The Council of Ministers, on its own initiative and having informed the Government Council of the correspondent Autonomous Community, or on advice of the latter, will be able to, with the approval of the Senate, issue a Royal Decree dissolving the local Corporations when their management actions represent a heavy prejudice to the general interest or a failure to fulfill their constitutional duties.

== The dissolution ==
Under this provision, the Junta de Andalucía advised the Spanish Government on April 4, 2006, to dissolve the Marbellian council. However, after the required approval of the Senate was unanimously granted the next day, doubt remained about who would take care of the city until the next election, scheduled for May 27, 2007. The normal outcome would have been to call fresh elections that would create a council serving less than a full term (because, unlike that of the general election, the date of local elections is fixed at the same for all Spanish municipalities), but the Electoral Regime Organic Act explicitly states, in its 183rd article, that

In the case of Local Corporation dissolution by agreement of the Council of Ministers, as outlined in the basic legislation of local regime, elections shall be called for the constitution of a new Corporation in at most three months, except when its term would extend less than a year from the date it would convene for the first time. While the new Corporation is assembled or the term of the dissolved one expires, the ordinary management of its duties will be assigned to a Management Committee appointed by the Provincial Council or, instead, the competent institution of the correspondent Autonomous Community. {...}

=== Calls for elections ===
People's Party leader Mariano Rajoy repeatedly requested the Government to invoke article 50 of the Public Administrations Juridic Regime and Common Administrative Procedure Act 1992, which allows, under special circumstances, to cut most of the terms involved in the election process in half. Such an action would place the new Council constitution date before the May 27 deadline imposed by the electoral law, so an election could have been held. He based his calls on the grounds that:

- The provincial assembly of Málaga, which would appoint the committee, is dominated by PSOE and United Left, so the impartiality of the new committee is not guaranteed.
- Many socialist councillors, including the one that ran for mayor in the last election, are in prison, while none of the PP councillors are known to be involved in the corruption. Polls suggest that, if elections were held now, the People's Party would win a majority in the council, up from its previous third force status after the (now defunct) GIL and the PSOE, so the new Corporation would be dominated by a party that is thought, as of today, corruption-free in Marbella.

On April 6, the Council of State decided against calling an election citing the time pressure as the determinant factor. The PP, nevertheless, proposed to modify the current election law to ease such restrains, citing this as "the most democratic path of action, consulting the people" and criticizing the PSOE government for its "lack of will to solve the problem" and its "focus on partisan interests above the people's". The same day, demonstrations demanding elections took place in Marbella.

=== Management committee formation ===
The next day, after a surprising government crisis caused by Defence Minister José Bono removal on his own request, the Council of Ministers agreed to issue Royal Decree 421/2006, dissolving the City Council of Marbella and commanding the Málaga provincial legislature to appoint the management committee.

In response to Rajoy's declarations, the minister for Public Administrations Jordi Sevilla announced that, as mandated by Royal Decree 707/1982, the Committee members' political affiliation would be the same as the substituted councillors', that is, the balance of power would mimic the 2003 election excluding the GIL, which had the majority with 15 councillors but had since then ceased to exist. Since the PSOE got 5 councillors in the election, the PP 4 and the PA 3, no party should hold a majority in the committee. The agreement reached by the parties with representation in the Málaga provincial legislature finally did change the 2003 power balance: the socialists appointed 6 members (amongst them the president), the same as the PP, while the PA and IU were represented by 2 members each, for a total of 16.

== Normalization ==
The appointed management committee ruled the city since early April 2006, its powers formally ending when the new Council elected in May 2007 was sworn in on June 16, so the citizens of Marbella were governed by unelected politicians for about one year and one month. In the 2007 election, the People's Party won a majority share of both the popular vote (50.5%) and the council (16 councilors of 27), and has ruled the city since.
