= Centro Deportivo Wanda Alcalá de Henares =

Football training ground in Alcalá de Henares, Spain

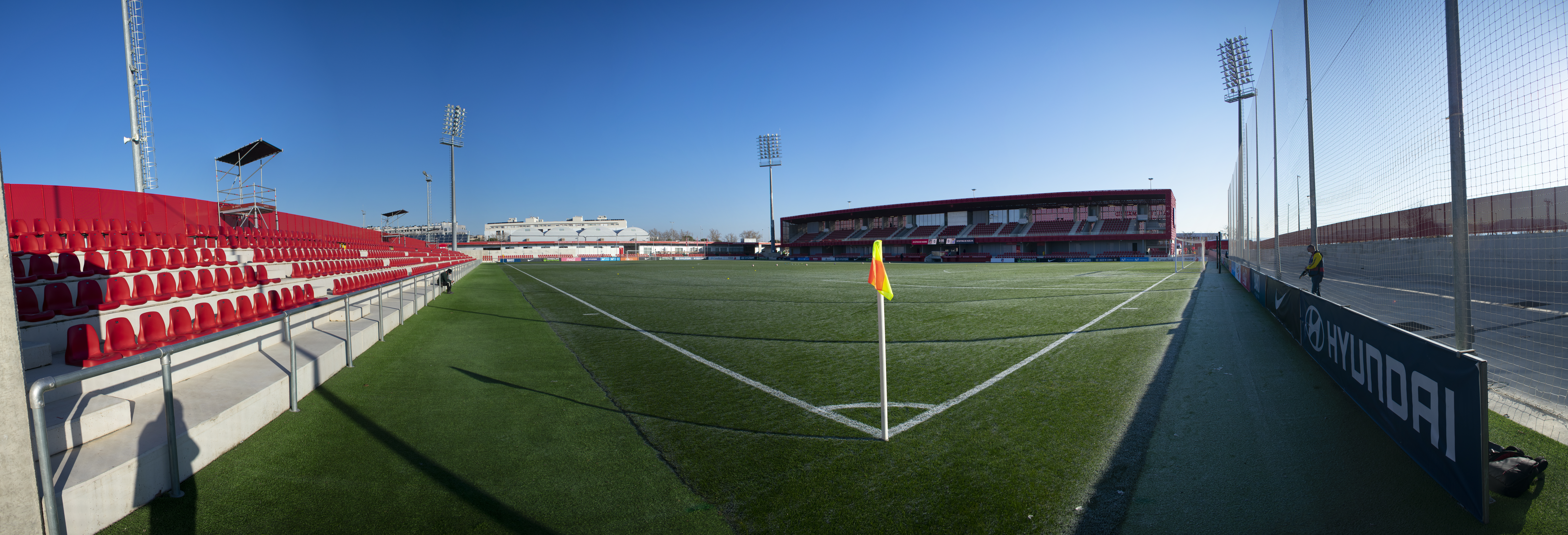
- Interactive map of Centro Deportivo Wanda Alcalá de Henares
- Location: Alcalá de Henares; Community of Madrid, Spain
- Coordinates: 40°30′30″N 03°21′45″W
- Owner: Atlético Madrid
- Capacity: 2,608
- Type: Football training facility
- Record attendance: 2,304 (Atlético Madrid Femenino v Sevilla; 15 September 2019)

Construction
- Opened: 24 September 2019
- Cost: €59.6m

Tenants
- Atlético Madrid Femenino (2019–); Atlético Madrid (youth) (2019–); Atlético Madrileño (2025–)

The Centro Deportivo Wanda Alcalá de Henares is a training ground and youth academy base of the Spanish football club, Atlético Madrid. Occupying an area of 70,000 m^{2} in the town of Alcalá de Henares to the northeast of Madrid, it was officially opened on 24 September 2019 and is used by the club's reserve team, youth academy and women's section – the senior men's squad train at the Ciudad Deportiva Atlético de Madrid in Majadahonda.

== Facilities ==
In addition to the service centre, the complex is home to:

- Main Stadium with natural grass, with a capacity of 2,608 seats
- 5 regular size pitches with artificial turf
- 1 seven-a-side artificial turf training pitch
- Multipurpose indoor sports hall
