= Miguel Ángel Gil Marín =

Spanish businessman (born 1963)

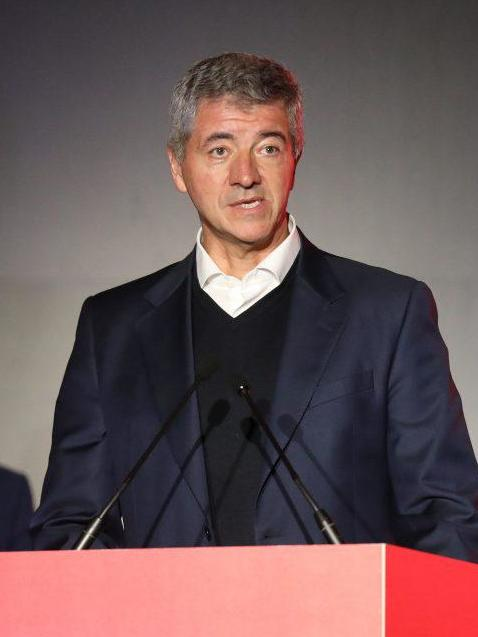
- Gil Marín in 2018
- Born: 28 May 1963 (age 63); Madrid, Spain
- Occupation: Sports executive · stockbreeder

Miguel Ángel Gil Marín (born 28 May 1963) is a Spanish sports executive and stockbreeder, CEO of Atlético de Madrid since 1993. He also is the main shareholder of the football team.

== Biography ==
Born in 1963 in Madrid, he is the second son of Jesús Gil y Gil, former President of Atlético Madrid (1987–2003) and Mayor of Marbella (1991–2002), and María Ángeles Marín Cobo. Graduated as veterinarian, his father gave him control over the Valdeolivas property in Arenas de San Pedro near the Sierra de Gredos, known as location for horse breeding. In time, Gil Marín developed a business conglomerate dedicated to horse and bull breeding as well as hunting activities, with businesses in both Valdeolivas (10 km^{2}) and the Finca El Arco (2.5 km^{2}) in the province of Toledo.

His father also introduced him to administration of the Atlético de Madrid football team, with Gil Marín becoming the CEO in 1993. Since 2004, as Jesús Gil died, he also became the owner of the majority of shares along Enrique Cerezo, who became Chairman of the company. As the conversion from football club into a Sociedad Anónima Deportiva (SAD) in the 1990s was ruled as a case of embezzlement ("unlawful appropriation") by justice (although the Supreme Court suspended the two-year prison sentence to Gil Marín and Cerezo as well as the restitution of shares in 2004 on the basis of the extinction of the charges after 5 years), the property over the shares remains controversial.

Gil Marín lives in the exclusive La Finca in Pozuelo de Alarcón; as of 2022, his fortune was estimated as the 52nd in Spain.

== Awards ==
- 2010 – Globe Soccer Awards (Best director of the year)
