= Ciudad Deportiva Atlético de Madrid =

Training ground of Atlético Madrid

- Escuela de Fútbol
- Interactive map of Ciudad Deportiva Atlético de Madrid
- Location: Majadahonda; Community of Madrid, Spain
- Coordinates: 40°27′33″N 03°51′32″W
- Owner: Atlético Madrid
- Capacity: 3,800
- Type: Football training facility

Construction
- Opened: 1995

Tenant
- Atlético Madrid (training) (1995-)

Ciudad Deportiva Atlético de Madrid, officially Ciudad Civitas Deportiva Atlético de Madrid is the training ground and academy base of Spanish football club Atlético Madrid. It was officially opened on 13 September 1995.

Located in Majadahonda and covering 55,000 m^{2}, it has been used since 1995 for senior team training. It is also home to the Estadio Cerro del Espino, which was used by Atlético Madrid B until 2025, and remains the home ground of CF Rayo Majadahonda.

== Facilities ==
- Estadio Cerro del Espino with a capacity of 3,800 seats
- Two grass pitches
- Two FieldTurf artificial pitches
- Service building with catering and other facilities
- Gymnasium

== Future sports city ==
In 2015, the club announced plans for a new training facility to be built in the city of Alcorcón, 15 km southwest of the Madrid metropolitan area. According to the preliminary design of the new sports city, the training centre would accommodate 11 regular-sized training pitches, a stadium with a capacity of 15,000 seats, a medical centre, a dressing room building and a residential building for the players. With an area of 1.4 million m^{2}, the new complex would cost about €114 million and be surrounded by a sports club including a golf course, multiple tennis courts and swimming pools, along with a hotel and a shopping centre.

Ultimately the club chose a different plan and constructed the Centro Deportivo Wanda Alcalá de Henares (north-east of Madrid) which opened in 2019, primarily for its women's section.
