= Estadio Cerro del Espino =

Multi-use stadium in Majadahonda, Spain

Coordinates: 40°27′27″N 3°51′37″W

Cerro del Espino
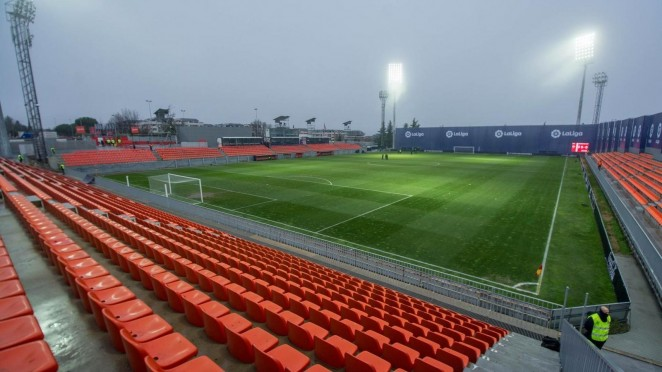
- Interactive map of Cerro del Espino
- Full name: Mini Estadio Cerro del Espino
- Location: Majadahonda, Spain
- Capacity: 3,800
- Surface: Grass
- Field size: 106x70m

Construction
- Opened: 1995
- Renovated: 2018

Tenants
- Atlético Madrid B (1997–2025); CF Rayo Majadahonda

The Mini Estadio Cerro del Espino is a multi-use stadium located in Majadahonda, Community of Madrid, Spain. It holds 3800 spectators.

It is currently used for football matches and is the home stadium of Atlético Madrid reserve teams and CF Rayo Majadahonda.

The venue is part of the Ciudad Deportiva Atlético de Madrid.

In the 2018–19 season, Rayo played its first Segunda División campaign at Atlético's Wanda Metropolitano due to the insufficient facilities at the ground.
