= Operation Malaya =

Spanish anticorruption investigation

Operation Malaya (Spanish: Operación Malaya) is a Spanish anti-corruption campaign in the southern resort city of Marbella. It began in 2006 and it is being carried out by the Policía Nacional under the direction of Judge Miguel Ángel Torres. The operation, now in its third phase, has the objective of exposing a network involved in concealing numerous illicit activities, (including bribery, embezzlement, and influence peddling) carried out by members of the Marbella City Council, businessmen, and prominent lawyers, among others. More than €2.4 billion has been seized so far.

On May 3, 2007, singer Isabel Pantoja was arrested for possible tax evasion and money laundering, which she allegedly did on behalf of the former mayor of Marbella, Julián Muñoz. He has already been jailed as part of the investigation, along with more than 100 others. Pantoja was later released on €90,000 bail.

== Background ==
In March 2005, investigations of the White Whale Operation dismantled the largest network of money laundering in the country. The evidence collected included intercepts of telephone conversations relating to cases of urban corruption in the Costa del Sol. A year later, Marbella City Council was wound up, and was replaced by a management committee presided over by Don Diego Martín Reye, pending fresh elections.

Following the creation of this management committee for Marbella City Hall, and after the arrival of democratic normality, the Andalusian Autonomous Government withdrew the authority to give urban planning consent [from Marbella City Council] based on Article 31.4 of the Andalusian Law on Urban Planning. This was according to the wording of the Law of November 2005 which states, "due to its serious influence on the planning powers of the regional autonomous authority [the Junta de Andalucía], set out in the Urban Planning Law of Andalusia (LOUA)", as reported by the Minister of the Board of Public Works and Transport."

== Related investigations ==
Operation Malaya opened the door to subsequent investigations into possible cases of urban corruption in Spain. While not all of Spain experienced such a high level of construction projects as the Costa del Sol prior to 2008, evidence of similar abuses has come to light in other parts of the country. There has already been consideration of what might be done to prevent similar webs of corruption in the future. It is widely acknowledged that the planning process in Spain could be improved to make the allocation of land for development more transparent.
