= Julián Muñoz =

Spanish politician (1947–2024)

Mayor of Marbella
- In office 2002–2003

Personal details
- Born: Julián Muñoz Palomo; 24 November 1947 El Arenal, Spain
- Died: 24 September 2024 (aged 76) Marbella, Andalusia, Spain
- Party: Independent Liberal Group

Julián Felipe Muñoz Palomo (Spanish: [xuliˈan feˈlipe muˈɲoθ paˈlomo]; 24 November 1947 – 24 September 2024) was a Spanish politician, known for his controversial tenure as mayor of Marbella and for having been the sentimental partner of singer Isabel Pantoja.

== Life and career ==
Muñoz studied law and married Maite Zaldívar. In 1991 he became an important member of the Independent Liberal Group (GIL), reaching second place in the electoral list in 1999. In 2002, following the resignation of Jesús Gil due to his involvement in a corruption case, Muñoz took over the duties of the Mayor of Marbella until he officially obtained the post on 2 May 2002.

In 2003 the GIL, with Muñoz as their leader, obtained an absolute majority in the Marbella town council. On 13 August of that year, Muñoz lost the mayorship after a motion of censure driven by a group of seven defectors from GIL, after which Marisol Yagüe became the new mayor.

Muñoz was arrested in July 2006 in the second phase of Operation Malaya, in the most important case of corruption in Spain up to then. Muñoz was convicted of several cases of bribery, embezzlement and breach of trust. After nearly two years behind bars he was released from prison in 2008 but was arrested again in 2013 for other offenses related to Operation Malaya. Due to poor health stemming from his having diabetes mellitus type 1 he was in a less restricted degree of incarceration since May 2016.

Muñoz died from lung cancer at the Costa del Sol Hospital in Marbella on 24 September 2024, at the age of 76.

Political offices
| Preceded by Jesús Gil | Mayor of Marbella; 2002–2003 | Succeeded by Marisol Yagüe |
