= Jesús Gil =

Spanish businessman & politician (1933–2004)

Mayor of Marbella
- In office 15 June 1991 – 24 April 2002
- Deputy: Pedro Román
- Preceded by: Francisco Parra Medina
- Succeeded by: Julián Muñoz

28th President of Atlético Madrid
- In office 26 June 1987 – 28 May 2003
- Preceded by: Francisco Javier Castedo
- Succeeded by: Enrique Cerezo

President of the Liberal Independent Group
- In office 14 February 1992 – 14 May 2004

Personal details
- Born: Gregorio Jesús Gil y Gil; 12 March 1933 El Burgo de Osma, Castile and León, Spain
- Died: 14 May 2004 (aged 71) Madrid, Spain
- Resting place: Cementerio de la Almudena
- Party: GIL
- Children: 4, including Miguel Ángel
- Occupation: Businessman

Gregorio Jesús Gil y Gil (12 March 1933 – 14 May 2004) was a Spanish businessman and politician. He served as Mayor of Marbella between 1991 and 2002, and presided for a 16-year tenure as president of the football club Atlético de Madrid. The Marbella city council had to be dissolved soon after his death, a legal but unprecedented movement in Spanish politics, to put an end to extreme corruption and dealings with international mafias, among other crimes.

== Career ==
=== Business ===
In the 1960s Gil ran a construction firm building gated communities. A complex he had built in San Rafael, near Segovia, collapsed in 1969, killing 58 people and injuring many others. A subsequent investigation showed that the cement in the new building had not yet set, and the whole project had been completed without use of architects, surveyors, or plans. Gil was sentenced to five years in prison, but was pardoned after 18 months by General Francisco Franco.

=== Football ===
In 1987, Gil was elected president at football side Atlético Madrid (his first signing was that of 21-year-old Portuguese winger Paulo Futre), where he initiated a volatile relationship with fans, reporters, players and head coaches. In 1992, he shut down Atlético's youth academy, which saw talented 15-year-old Raúl switch to crosstown rivals Real Madrid.

Most of Marbella's local police were recruited indirectly by Gil among legionnaires and members of other elite military forces throughout southern Spain and Northern Africa during the 1980s / 1990s, and some of these officers comprised Gil's own private garde de corps.

In a March 1997 incident, as the two teams met in the 1996–97 Champions League quarter-finals, Gil referred to Ajax Amsterdam, due to its many players of Surinamese origin, as FC Congo.

The English band Prolapse released a song called "Surreal Madrid" on their album Pointless Walks to Dismal Places, which lyrics detailing Gil's controversial tenure as Atlético Madrid's president.

=== Politics ===
In 1991, he founded and led the Grupo Independiente Liberal (GIL) as his political vehicle, and was elected as mayor of Marbella the same year. He installed a bust of Francisco Franco in the town hall and was known for walking the streets of the town shouting abuse at prostitutes and homeless people. His mayorship was popular enough for him to be re-elected three times.

In April 2002, he was banned for 28 years from holding public office, forced to stand down as mayor and briefly imprisoned.

In early 2008, a full, two-episode documentary appeared in Tele 5 explaining the highlights of his life and career.

== Death ==
On 9 May 2004, he suffered a cerebral venous sinus thrombosis in his finca in Valdeolivas. He died in Madrid on 14 May at the age of 71. The funeral was attended by 20,000 people. He was cremated and his ashes were interred in the family mausoleum at the Cementerio de la Almudena.

== Political reputation ==
Gil was controversial for his social and political views, summed up in a brand of foulmouthed, low-brow populism punctuated by self-aggrandizing, homophobic, racist, xenophobic, and otherwise derogatory remarks and occasionally, by pre-democratic nostalgia.

He publicly referred to former Spanish Socialist Workers' Party (PSOE) town councilor Isabel García Marcos as a "whore" during town council meetings and, on one occasion, dubbed journalist Carmen Rigalt as "la jinetera del periodismo" ('prostitute of journalism').

The Málaga coastline, effectively under the area of economic and political influence of the Gil family, became a popular residence for British, Italian, and Russian gangsters while he was mayor, as well as a haven for former national socialists either awaiting or shirking extradition, such as Otto Remer and Léon Degrelle. At the same time, however, Gil instigated several crackdowns on drug users and prostitutes. He was involved in several criminal cases, including the so-called Caso de las camisetas and Caso Atlético.

Crime rates and open manifestations of poverty decreased dramatically during the first years of his administration. The improvements included the beatings of delinquents and prostitutes, relocation of foreigners with low incomes, and handouts of money to homeless people in exchange for leaving town. The subsequent improvement in the lifestyle of a segment of the population was cited as a major reason for his re-election.

== See also ==
- Marbella City Council dissolution

Sporting positions
Preceded by Francisco Javier Castedo	President of Atlético Madrid; 1987–2003	Succeeded by Enrique Cerezo
Political offices
Preceded by Francisco Parra Medina	Mayor of Marbella; 1991–2002	Succeeded by Julián Muñoz
