= Atlético Madrid =

Association football club in Spain

- Full name: Club Atlético de Madrid, S.A.D.
- Nicknames: Rojiblancos (Red-and-Whites); Colchoneros (Mattress Makers); Indios (Indians)
- Founded: 26 April 1903; 123 years ago (as Athletic Club Sucursal de Madrid)
- Stadium: Estadio Riyadh Air Metropolitano
- Capacity: 70,813
- Owner(s): Apollo Sports Capital (55%); Quantum Pacific Group (25%); Others (20%)
- President: Enrique Cerezo
- Head coach: Diego Simeone
- League: La Liga
- 2025–26: La Liga, 4th of 20
- Website: atleticodemadrid.com
Home colours	Away colours	Third colours

Club Atlético de Madrid, S.A.D. (Spanish pronunciation: [ˈkluβ aˈtletiko ðe maˈðɾið]; meaning "Athletic Club of Madrid"), commonly referred to in English as Atlético Madrid or simply Atlético and colloquially as Atleti, is a Spanish professional football club based in Madrid that plays in La Liga. The club play their home games at the Riyadh Air Metropolitano, which has a capacity of 70,813.

Founded on 26 April 1903 as Athletic Club Sucursal de Madrid (a branch of Bilbao-based Athletic Club), the entity merged with Club Aviación Nacional in 1939, becoming Atlético de Madrid in 1946. After 1987, Jesús Gil oversaw the transformation from sports club to sociedad anónima deportiva (S.A.D.), underpinning his family's control over the shareholding structure through misappropriation. The club's traditional kits consist of red and white vertical striped shirts and blue shorts. Followers are nicknamed as colchoneros ('mattress makers'), indios ('Indians') and rojiblancos ('redwhites'). Prince Felipe, later King Felipe VI, has been the honorary president of the club since 2003.

Atlético are one of the most successful Spanish clubs, having won 11 La Liga titles, including a league and cup double in 1996. Further domestic trophies include 10 Copa del Rey titles, as well as two Supercopa de España, one Copa Presidente FEF and one Copa Eva Duarte titles. They have also won numerous titles in Europe, including the European Cup Winners' Cup in 1962, the UEFA Europa League in 2010, 2012 and 2018, and the UEFA Super Cup in 2010, 2012 and 2018, in addition to the 1974 Intercontinental Cup. In the European Cup/UEFA Champions League, Atlético reached the final in 1974, 2014 and 2016. They sustain a standing rivalry with Madrid neighbours Real Madrid, with whom they contest the Madrid derby.

== History ==
=== Foundation and first years (1903–1939) ===
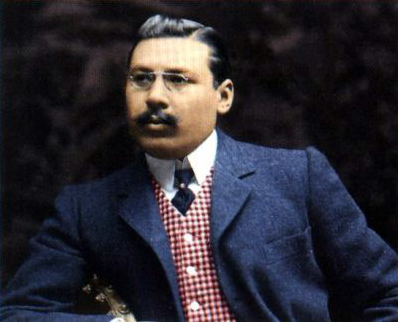
Enrique Allende, first President of the club after its establishment in 1903

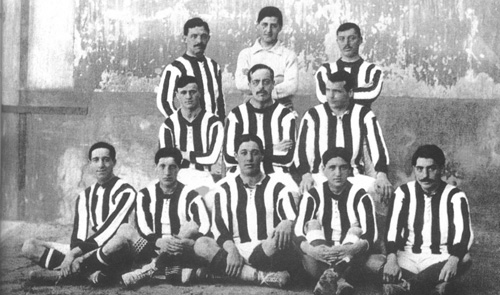
An Athletic Madrid lineup of 1910 in their new red and white kit

The club was founded on 26 April 1903 as Athletic Club Sucursal de Madrid by three Basque students living in Madrid. These founders saw the new club as a youth branch of their childhood team, Athletic Bilbao who they had just seen win the 1903 Copa del Rey Final in the city. In 1904, they were joined by dissident members of Real Madrid. They began playing in blue and white halved shirts, the then colours of Athletic Bilbao. Bilbao had switched to their current red and white stripes by 1910, whereas the Madrid team only adopted their now traditional red and white striped shirts in 1911. Some believe the change came about because red and white striped tops were the cheapest to make, as the same combination was used to make ticking for mattresses, and the unused cloth was easily converted into football shirts. This contributed to the club's nickname, Los Colchoneros.

However, another explanation is that both Athletic Bilbao and Athletic Madrid used to buy Blackburn Rovers' blue and white kits in England. In late 1909, Juan Elorduy, a former player and member of the board of Athletic Madrid, went to England to buy kits for both teams but failed to find Blackburn kits to purchase; he instead bought the red and white shirts of Southampton (the club from the port city which was his embarkation point back to Spain). An investigation in 2023 proposed an alternative kit origin location as Sunderland, whose team also wore those colours. Athletic Madrid adopted the red and white shirt, leading to them being known as Los Rojiblancos, but opted to keep their existing blue shorts whereas the Bilbao team switched to new black shorts. Athletic Bilbao won the 1911 Copa del Rey Final using several 'borrowed' players from Athletic Madrid, including Manolón who scored one of their goals.

Athletic's first ground, the Ronda de Vallecas, was in the eponymous working-class area on the south side of the city. In 1919, the Compañía Urbanizadora Metropolitana—the company that ran the underground communication system in Madrid—acquired some land, near the Ciudad Universitaria. In 1921, Athletic Madrid became independent of parent-club Athletic Bilbao and moved into a 35,800-seater stadium built by the company, the Estadio Metropolitano de Madrid.

During the 1920s, Athletic won the Campeonato del Centro three times and were Copa del Rey runners-up in 1921, where they faced parent club Athletic Bilbao, as they would again in 1926. Based on these successes, in 1928 they were invited to join the Primera División of the inaugural La Liga played the following year. During their debut La Liga campaign, the club was managed by Fred Pentland, but after two seasons they were relegated to Segunda División. They briefly returned to La Liga in 1934 but were relegated again in 1936 after Josep Samitier took over in mid-season from Pentland. The Spanish Civil War gave Los Colchoneros a reprieve, as Real Oviedo was unable to play due to the destruction of their stadium during the bombings. Thus, both La Liga and Athletic's relegation were postponed, the latter by winning a playoff against Osasuna, champion of the Segunda División tournament.

=== Athletic Aviación de Madrid (1939–1947) ===
By 1939, when La Liga had resumed, Athletic had merged with Aviación Nacional of Zaragoza to become Athletic Aviación de Madrid. Aviación Nacional had been founded in 1937 by three aviation officers of the Spanish Air Force. They had been promised a place in the Primera División for the 1939–40 season, only to be denied by the RFEF, and since they did not want to go through the whole divisional climb up, this club merged with Athletic, whose squad had lost eight players during the Civil War, including the team's star, Monchín Triana, who was shot dead. At that time, Real Oviedo also had its field destroyed by the war, so it was decided to give up its place to another team, and that finals spot was contested by Aviación and Osasuna, in a match in Valencia on 26 November 1939, which Aviación won 3–1. With the legendary Ricardo Zamora as manager, the club subsequently won their first La Liga title that season and retained the titles in 1941. The most influential and charismatic player of these years was the captain Germán Gómez, who was signed from Racing Santander in 1939. He played eight consecutive seasons for the Rojiblancos until the 1947–48 campaign. From his central midfield position, he formed a legendary midfield alongside Machín and Ramón Gabilondo.

In mid-1940, a decree issued by Francisco Franco banned teams from using foreign names and the club became Atlético Aviación de Madrid. In September 1940, Atlético Aviación won the first Super cup in Spanish football after beating RCD Español, the 1940 Copa del Generalísimo winners, in a two-legged game that ended in a 10–4 aggregate victory, including a 7–1 trashing in the second leg at Campo de Fútbol de Vallecas. On 14 December 1946, the club decided to drop the military association from its name, and shortly after, on 6 January, it settled on its current name of Club Atlético de Madrid. Also in 1947, Atlético beat Real Madrid 5–0 at the Metropolitano, their biggest win over their cross-town rivals to date.

=== Golden age (1947–1965) ===
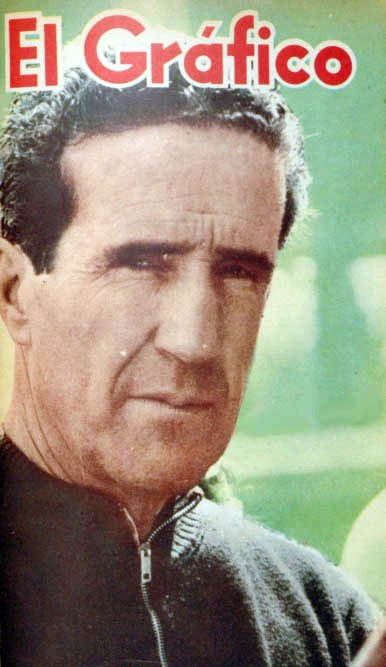
Helenio Herrera won two league titles as Atlético manager

Under Helenio Herrera and with the help of Larbi Benbarek, Atlético won La Liga again in 1950 and 1951. With the departure of Herrera in 1953, the club began to slip behind Real Madrid and Barcelona and for the remainder of the 1950s were left to battle it out with Athletic Bilbao for the title of third team in Spain.

However, during the 1960s and 1970s, Atlético Madrid seriously challenged Barcelona for the position of second team. The 1957–58 season saw Ferdinand Daučík take charge of Atlético, where he led them to second place in La Liga. This resulted in Atlético qualifying for the 1958–59 European Cup since the winners, Real Madrid, were the reigning European champions. Inspired by Brazilian centre-forward Vavá and Enrique Collar, Atlético reached the semi-finals after beating Drumcondra, CSKA Sofia and Schalke 04. In the semi-finals, they met Real Madrid, who won the first leg 2–1 at the Santiago Bernabéu while Atlético won 1–0 at the Metropolitano. The tie went to a replay and Real won 2–1 in Zaragoza.

Atlético, however, gained their revenge when, led by former Real coach José Villalonga, they defeated Real in two successive Copa del Rey finals in 1960 and 1961. In 1962, they won the European Cup Winners' Cup, beating Fiorentina 3–0 after a replay. This achievement was significant for the club, as the Cup Winners' Cup was the only major European trophy that Real Madrid never won. The following year, the club reached the 1963 finals, but lost to English side Tottenham Hotspur 5–1. Enrique Collar, who continued to be an influential player during this era, was now joined by the likes of midfielder Miguel Jones and midfield playmaker Adelardo.

Atlético's best years coincided with dominant Real Madrid teams. Between 1961 and 1980, Real Madrid dominated La Liga, winning the competition 14 times. During this era, only Atlético offered Real any serious challenge, winning La Liga titles in 1966, 1970, 1973 and 1977 and finishing runners-up in 1961, 1963 and 1965. The club had further success winning the Copa del Rey on three occasions in 1965, 1972 and 1976. In 1965, when they finished as La Liga runners-up to Real after an intense battle for the titles, Atlético became the first team to beat Real at the Bernabéu in eight years.

=== European Cup finalists (1965–1974) ===
Chart of Atleti's finishing positions in the Spanish football league system

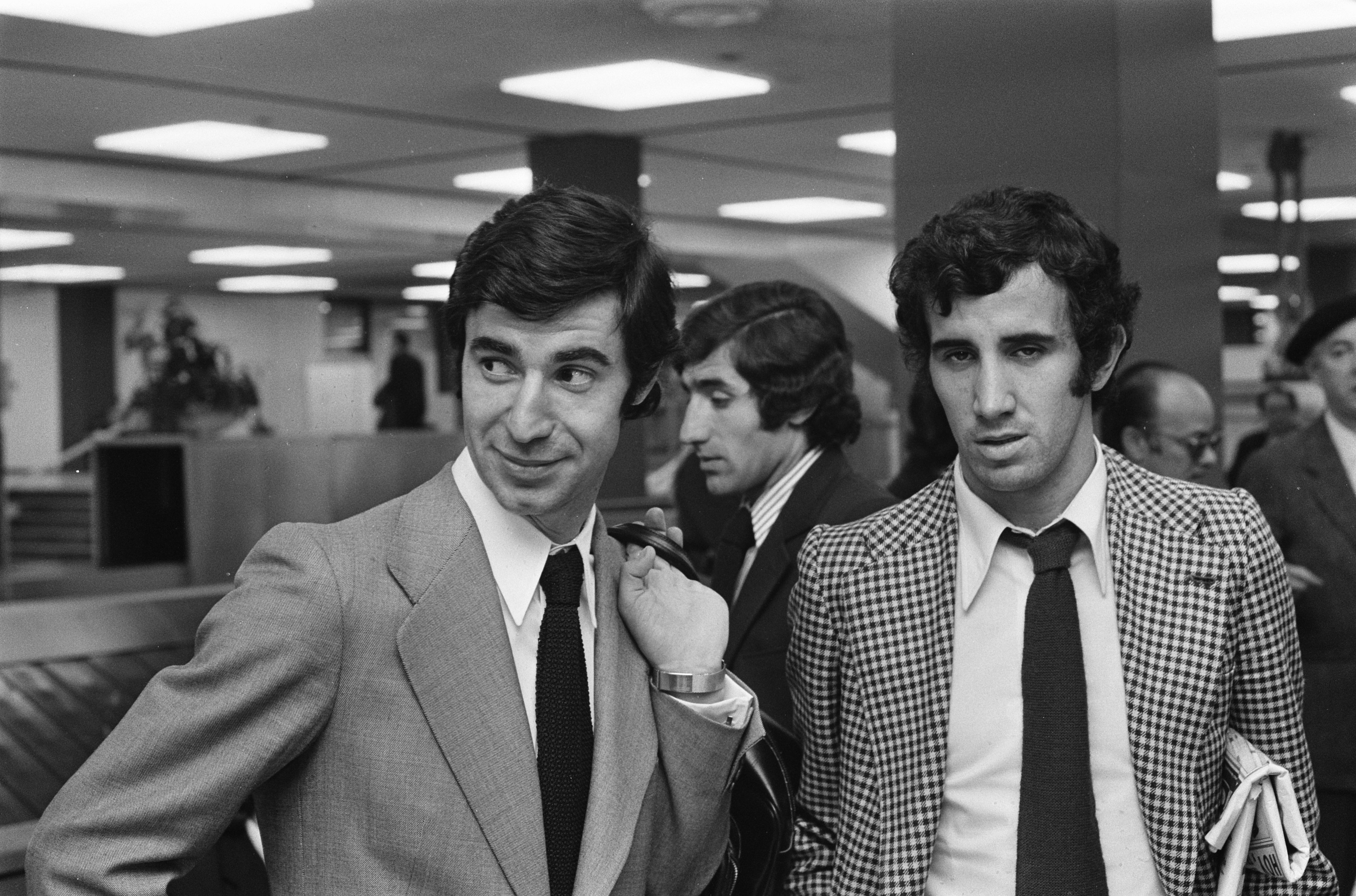
José Eulogio Gárate and Javier Irureta proved important attacking pieces of the squad that took Atlético to the 1974 European Cup final

In 1966, Atlético left the Estadio Metropolitano de Madrid (which was demolished and was replaced with university buildings and an office block belonging to the company ENUSA) and moved to a new home in the Manzanares river waterfront, the Vicente Calderón Stadium, which was inaugurated on 2 October 1966 with a fixture against Valencia. Significant players from this era included the now-veteran Adelardo and regular goalscorers Luis Aragonés, Javier Irureta and José Eulogio Gárate, the latter winning the Pichichi three times in 1969, 1970 and 1971. In the 1970s, Atlético also recruited several Argentine players, signing Rubén Ayala, Panadero Díaz and Ramón "Cacho" Heredia as well as coach Juan Carlos Lorenzo. Lorenzo believed in discipline, caution and disrupting the opponents' game, and although controversial, his methods proved successful—after winning La Liga in 1973, the club reached the 1974 European Cup Final. On the way to the Final, Atlético knocked out Galatasaray, Dinamo București, Red Star Belgrade and Celtic. In the away leg of the semi-finals against Celtic, Atlético had Ayala, Díaz and substitute Quique all sent off during a hard-fought encounter in what was reported as one of the worst cases of cynical fouling the tournament has seen. Because of this approach, they managed a 0–0 draw, followed by a 2–0 victory in the return leg with goals from Gárate and Adelardo. The finals at Heysel Stadium, however, was a loss for Atlético. Against a Bayern Munich team that included Franz Beckenbauer, Sepp Maier, Paul Breitner, Uli Hoeneß and Gerd Müller, Atlético played above themselves. Despite missing Ayala, Díaz and Quique through suspension, they went ahead in extra-time with only seven minutes left. Aragonés scored with a superb, curling free-kick that looked like the winner, but in the last minute of the game, Bayern defender Georg Schwarzenbeck equalized with a stunning 25-yarder that left Atlético goalkeeper Miguel Reina motionless. In a replay back at Heysel two days later, Bayern won convincingly 4–0, with two goals each from Hoeneß and Müller.

=== The Aragonés years (1974–1987) ===
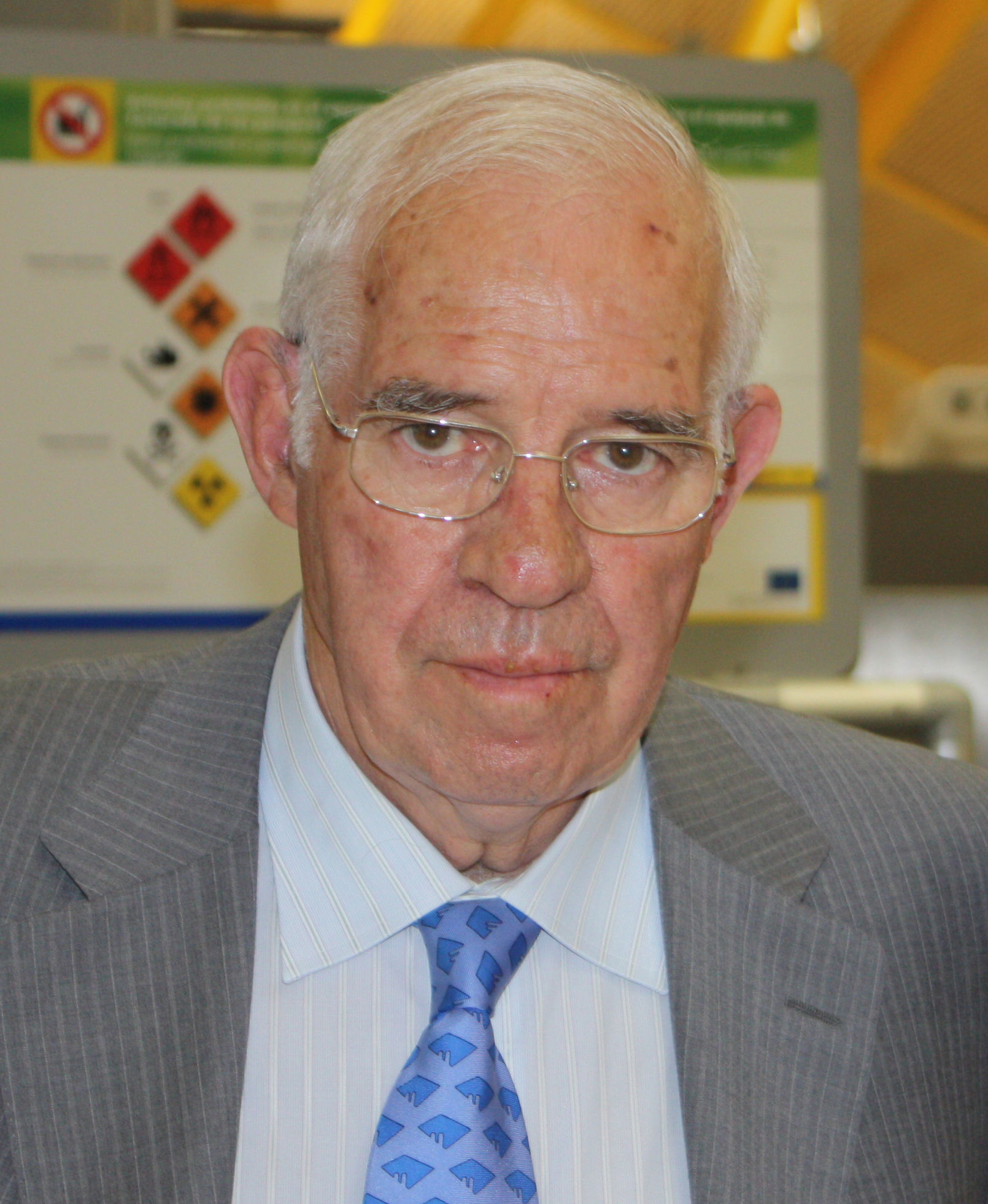
Luis Aragonés, Atlético's most successful manager

Shortly after the defeat in the 1974 European Cup Final, Atlético appointed their veteran player Luis Aragonés as coach. Aragonés subsequently was coach on four occasions, from 1974 to 1980, from 1982 to 1987, once again from 1991 until 1993 and finally from 2002 to 2003. His first success came quickly as Bayern Munich had refused to participate in the Intercontinental Cup because of fixture congestion, and as European Cup runners-up, Atlético were invited instead. Their opponents were Independiente of Argentina and, after losing the away leg 1–0, they won the return leg 2–0 with goals from Javier Irureta and Rubén Ayala. Aragonés subsequently led the club to further successes in the Copa del Rey in 1976 and La Liga in 1977.

During his second spell in charge, Aragonés led the club to a runners-up finish in La Liga and a winner's medal in the Copa del Rey, both in 1985. He received considerable help from Hugo Sánchez, who scored 19 league goals and won the Pichichi. Sánchez also scored twice in the cup finals as Atlético beat Athletic Bilbao 2–1. Sánchez, however, only remained at the club for one season before his move across the city to Real Madrid. Despite the loss of Sánchez, Aragonés went on to lead the club to success in the Supercopa de España in 1985 and then guided them to the European Cup Winners' Cup final in 1986. Atlético, however, lost their third successive European finals, this time 3–0 to Dynamo Kyiv.

=== The Transition years (1987–2005) ===
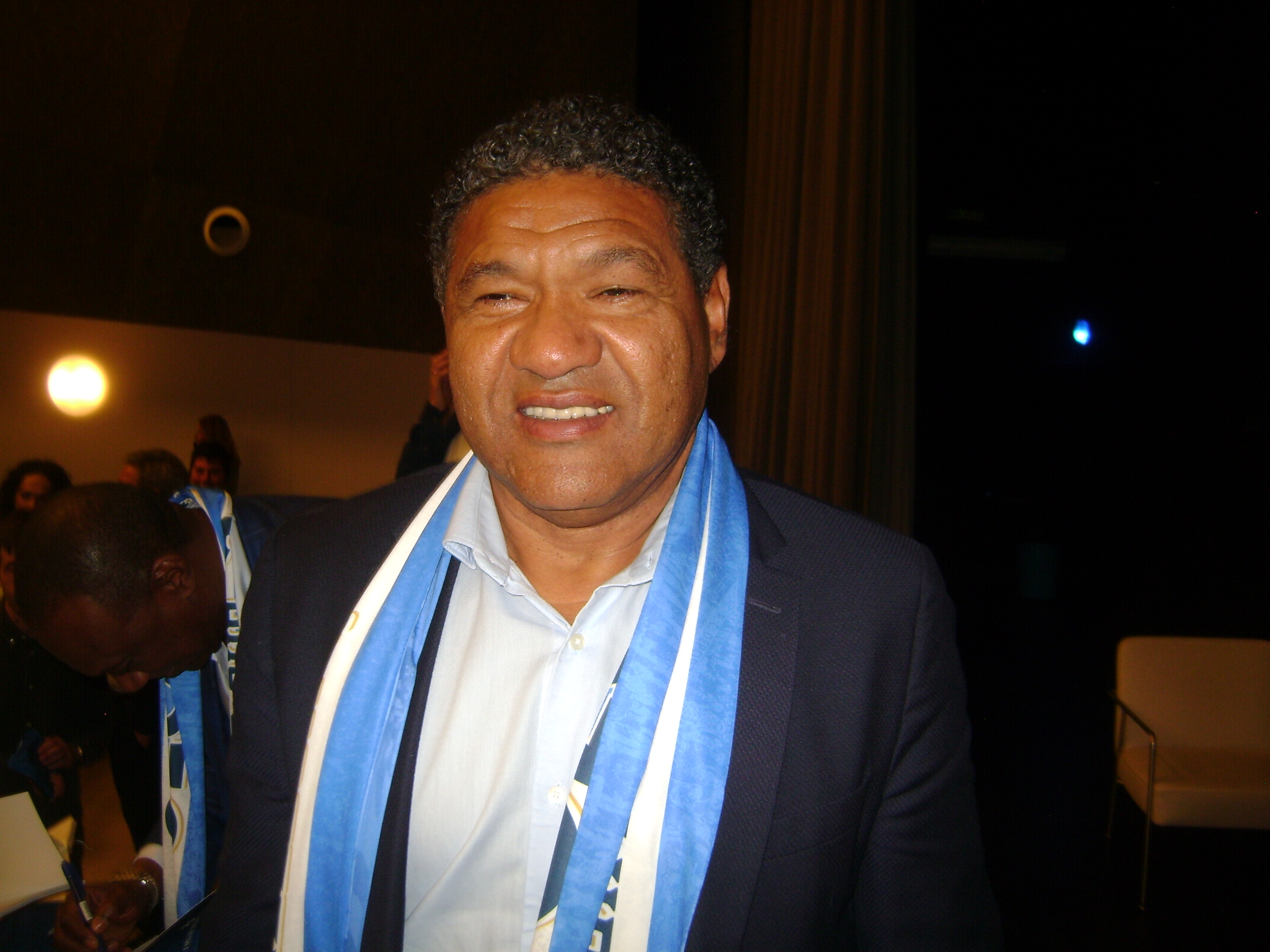
Donato played in Atlético between 1988 and 1993

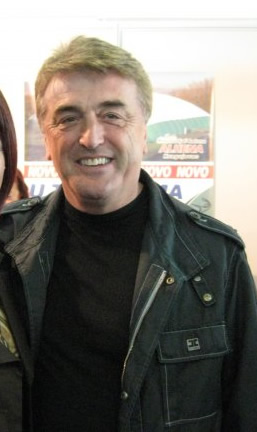
Radomir Antić managed Atlético in three stints during the ownership of Jesús Gil, winning a league and cup double in 1996

In 1987, controversial politician and businessman Jesús Gil became club president, running the club (and committing a fraud of misappropriation by seizing 95% of the shares while failing to effectively pay a single Peseta during the Atlético's forced conversion from fan-owned club to Sociedad Anónima Deportiva in 1992) until his resignation in May 2003.

Atlético had not won La Liga for ten years and were desperate for league success. Right away, Gil spent heavily, bringing in a number of expensive signings, most notably Portuguese winger Paulo Futre, who had just won the European Cup with Porto. All the spending, however, only brought in two consecutive Copa del Rey trophies in 1991 and 1992 as the league titles proved elusive. The closest Atlético came to the La Liga trophy was the 1990–91 season when they finished runners-up by 10 points to Johan Cruyff's Barcelona. In the process, Gil developed a ruthless reputation due to the manner in which he ran the club. In pursuit of league success, he hired and fired a number of high-profile head coaches, including César Luis Menotti, Ron Atkinson, Javier Clemente, Tomislav Ivić, Francisco Maturana and Alfio Basile, as well as club legend Luis Aragonés. Gil also closed down Atlético's youth academy in 1992, a move that would prove significant due to 15-year-old academy member Raúl who, as a result, went across town to later achieve worldwide fame with rivals Real Madrid. The move came as part of the overall Gil-initiated business restructuring of the club; Atlético became a Sociedad Anónima Deportiva, a corporate structure benefiting from a then-recently introduced special legal status under Spanish corporate law, allowing individuals to purchase and trade club shares.

In the 1994–95 league campaign, Atlético only avoided relegation via a draw on the last day of the season. This prompted another managerial change along with a wholesale squad clearance during the summer 1995 transfer window. Somewhat unexpectedly, in the following 1995–96 season, newly arrived head coach Radomir Antić, with a squad including holdovers Toni, Roberto Solozábal, Delfí Geli, Juan Vizcaíno, José Luis Caminero, Diego Simeone and Kiko, as well as new acquisitions Milinko Pantić, Lyuboslav Penev, Santi Denia and José Francisco Molina finally delivered the much sought-after league titles as Atlético won the La Liga/Copa del Rey double. The next season, 1996–97, saw the club take part in the UEFA Champions League for the first time. With expectations and ambitions raised, the most notable summer transfer signings were striker Juan Esnáider from Real Madrid and Radek Bejbl, who was coming off a great showing for Czech Republic at Euro 1996. Playing on two fronts, Atlético fell out of the league title contention early while, in the Champions League, they were eliminated by Ajax in extra-time in the quarter-finals. Before the 1997–98 season, the heavy spending continued with the signings of Christian Vieri and Juninho. All of the success, however, produced little change in the overall Gil strategy, and although Antić survived three consecutive seasons in charge, he was replaced during the summer of 1998 with Arrigo Sacchi, who himself only remained in the managerial hot seat for less than six months. Antić then returned briefly in early 1999 only to be replaced with Claudio Ranieri at the end of the season.

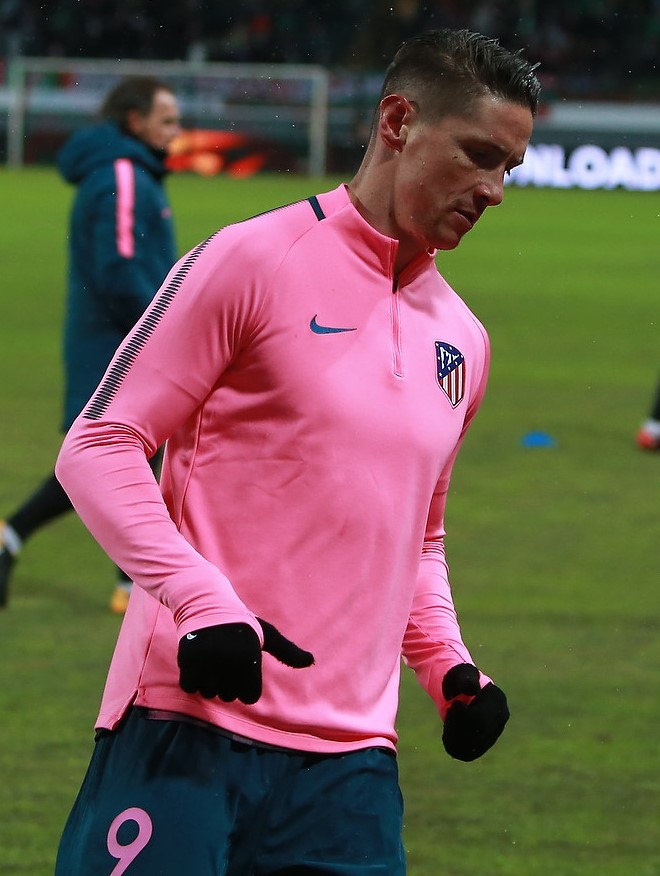
Fernando Torres, who began his career at Atlético, achieved notable success with the Spain national team

The 1999–2000 season proved disastrous for Atlético. In December 1999, Gil and his board were suspended pending an investigation into the misuse of club funds, with government-appointed administrator José Manuel Rubí running Atlético's day-to-day operations. With the removal of club president Jesús Gil and his board, the players performed poorly and the club floundered. Ranieri handed in his resignation with the club sitting 17th out of 20 in the league table and heading towards relegation. Antić, returning for his third coaching stint, was unable to prevent the inevitable. Despite reaching the Copa del Rey final in 2000, Atlético were relegated for the second time in 66 years. The club spent two seasons in the Segunda División, narrowly missing out on promotion in 2000–01 season before winning the Segunda División championship in 2002. It was again Aragonés, in his fourth and last spell as manager of Atlético, who brought them back to the Primera División.

Aragonés also coached the team during the next season, and gave Fernando Torres his La Liga debut. Torres came through the academy of the club and was a hot prospect in Spain; in his first season in the league, 2002–03, he scored 13 goals in 29 appearances. In July 2003, soon after his takeover of the club, Chelsea owner Roman Abramovich offered £28 million for Torres, which was rejected by Atlético. In the 2003–04 season, Torres continued his success as he scored 19 league goals in 35 appearances, making him the joint third-highest scorer in the league. Torres had been at Atlético since the age of 11 and his precocious talent led to him becoming the club's youngest ever captain at the age of just 19.

=== Torres sale and eventual European success (2006–2011) ===
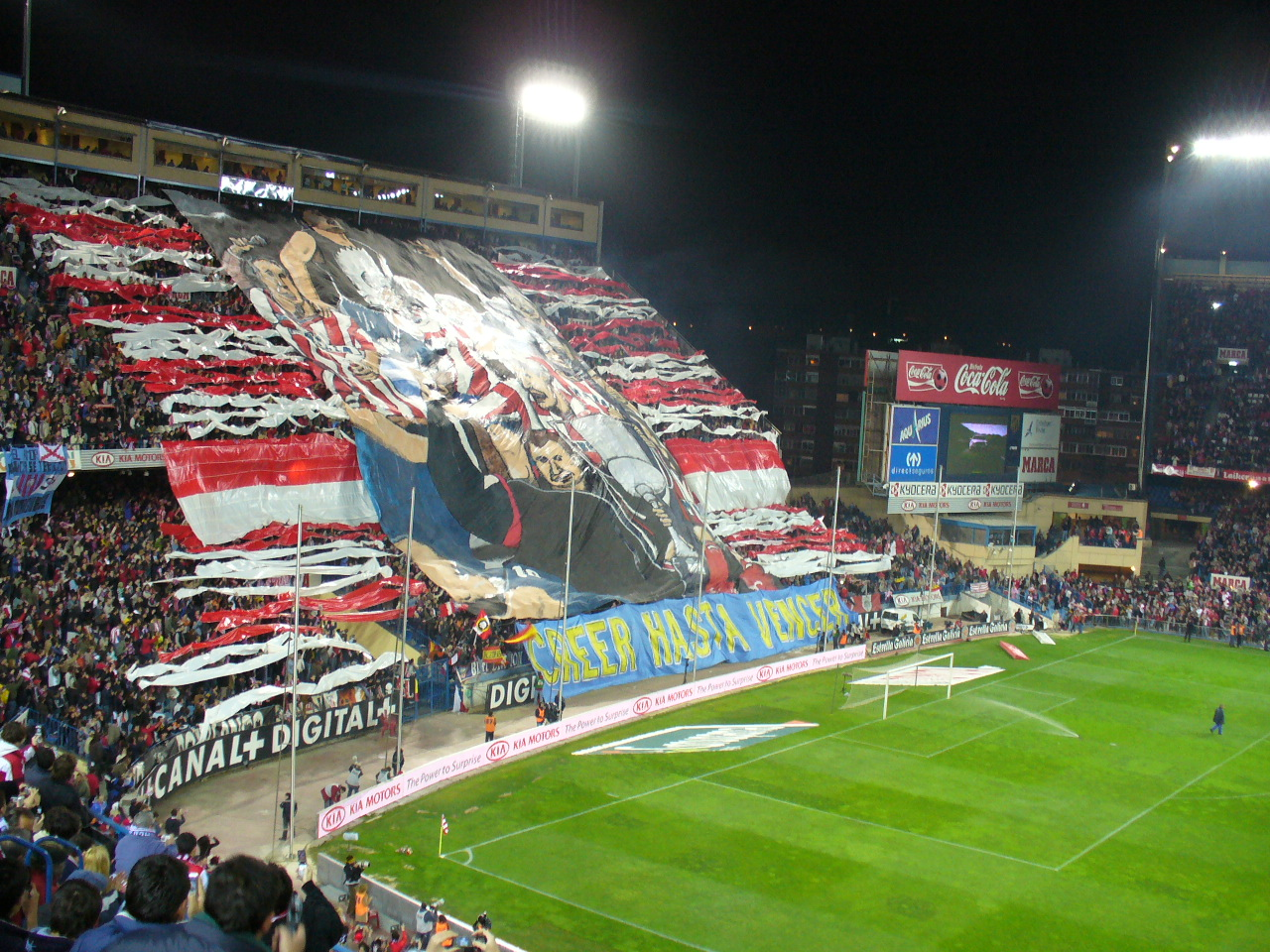
Atlético fans during a Madrid derby in February 2007 played at the Vicente Calderón Stadium

In 2006, Atlético signed Portuguese midfielders Costinha and Maniche, as well as Argentine forward Sergio Agüero. In July 2007, Torres left the club for Liverpool for €38 million, while Luis García signed for the club at the same time in an unrelated transfer. The club also bought Uruguay international and former European Golden Boot and Pichichi winners Diego Forlán for roughly €21 million from Villarreal. Other additions included Portuguese winger Simão Sabrosa from Benfica for €20 million and winger José Antonio Reyes from Arsenal for €12 million.

In July 2007, the Atlético board reached an agreement with the City of Madrid to sell the land where their stadium was located and move the club to the City-owned Olympic Stadium. The stadium changed hands in 2016 and was bought by the club for €30.4 million. Madrid had applied to host the 2016 Olympic Games, losing out to Rio de Janeiro. The 2007–08 season proved to be the most successful season for the club in the past decade. The team reached the round of 32 in the UEFA Cup, where they were defeated by Bolton Wanderers. They also reached the quarter-finals round of the Copa del Rey, where they were beaten by eventual champions Valencia. More significantly, the team finished the league season in fourth place, qualifying for the UEFA Champions League for the first time since the 1996–97 season.

On 3 February 2009, Javier Aguirre was dismissed from his post as manager after a poor start to the season, going without a win in six games. He later claimed that this was not accurate, and that he had left by mutual termination rather than through sacking. There was public outrage after his dismissal, many believing he was not the cause of Atlético's problems, namely player Diego Forlán. He backed his former manager and said that, "Dismissing Javier was the easy way out, but he was not the cause of our problems. The players are to blame because we have not been playing well and we have been committing a lot of errors." This led to the appointment of Abel Resino as Atlético's new manager. Atlético's success continued in the latter half of the season when they placed fourth once again in the league table, securing a position in the playoff round of the UEFA Champions League. Striker Diego Forlán was crowned with the Pichichi and also won the European Golden Shoe after scoring 32 goals for Atlético that season. Atlético saw this domestic success as an opportunity to reinforce their squad for the upcoming Champions League season. They replaced veteran goalkeeper Leo Franco with David de Gea from the youth ranks and signed promising youngster Sergio Asenjo from Real Valladolid. Atlético also acquired Real Betis defender and Spanish international Juanito on a free transfer. Despite pressure from big clubs to sell star players Agüero and Forlán, Atlético remained committed to keeping their strong attacking base in the hopes for a successful new season.

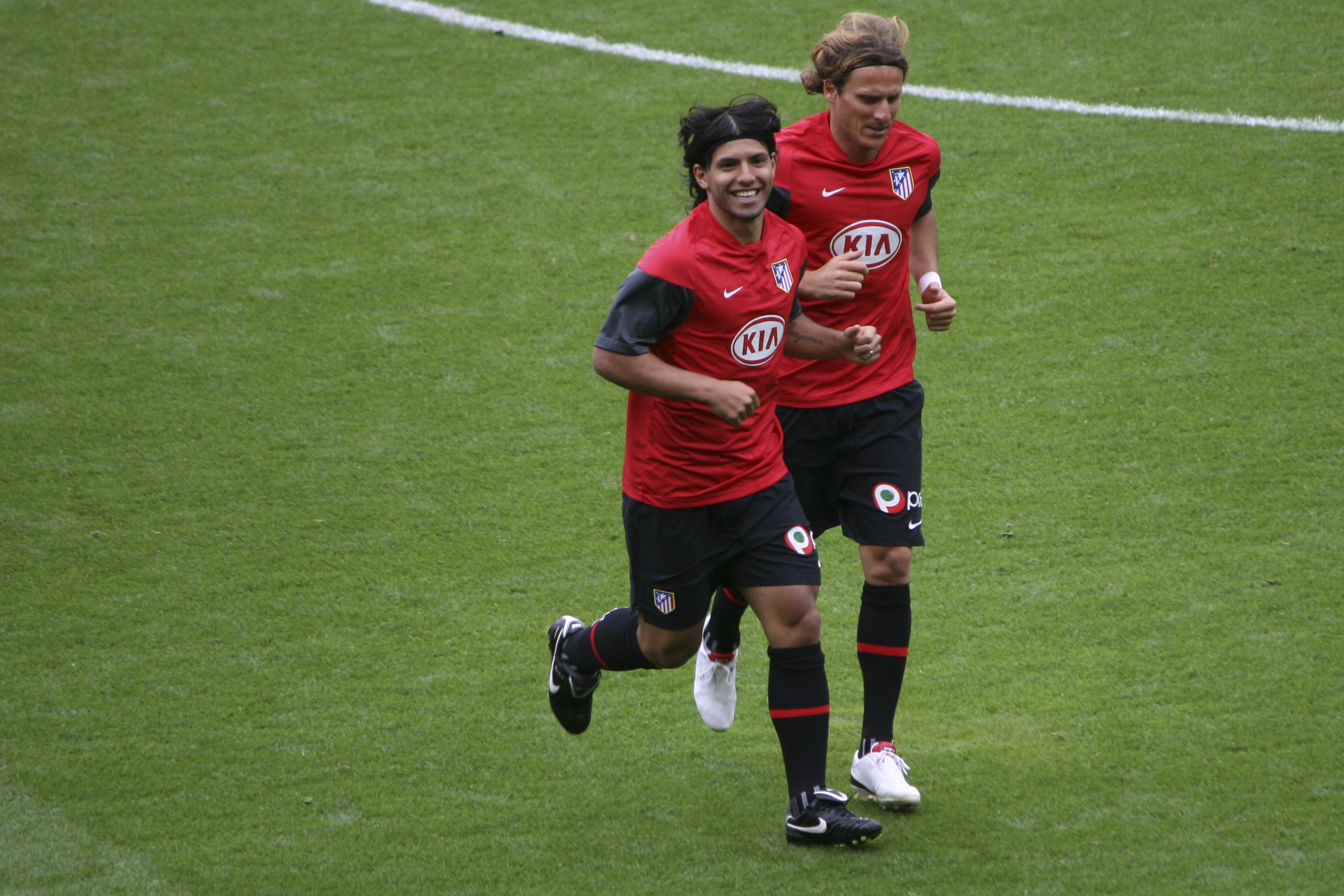
Atlético's striker partnership during this era: Sergio Agüero (left) and Diego Forlán (right). Forlán won the European Golden Shoe in 2009

The 2009–10 season, however, began poorly with many defeats and goals conceded. On 21 October, Atlético were hammered 4–0 by English club Chelsea in the Champions League group stage. This defeat led Atlético's management to announce that manager Abel Resino had to leave. After failing to sign Danish former footballer Michael Laudrup, Atlético Madrid announced that the new manager for the rest of the season would be Quique Sánchez Flores. With the arrival of Sánchez Flores as coach in October 2009, Atlético improved in many of their competition. Atlético continued to lag somewhat in La Liga during the 2009–10 season, finishing in ninth position, but managed to finish third in their 2009–10 UEFA Champions League group stage and subsequently entered the Europa League in the round of 32. Atlético went on to win the Europa League, beating English teams Liverpool in the semi-finals and eventually Fulham in the finals held at HSH Nordbank Arena in Hamburg on 12 May 2010. Diego Forlán scored twice, the second being an extra-time winner in the 116th minute, as Atlético won 2–1. It was the first time since the 1961–62 European Cup Winners' Cup that Atlético had claimed a European titles. They also reached the Copa del Rey finals on 19 May 2010, where they faced Sevilla, but lost 2–0 at the Camp Nou in Barcelona. By winning the Europa League, they qualified for the 2010 UEFA Super Cup against Inter Milan, winner of the 2009–10 UEFA Champions League. The match was played at the Stade Louis II, Monaco on 27 August 2010. Atlético won 2–0 with goals from José Antonio Reyes and Agüero, making it the club's first win in the UEFA Super Cup.

Atlético had a comparatively disappointing 2010–11 season, finishing only seventh in the League and being eliminated in the quarter-finals of the Copa del Rey and the group stage of the Europa League. This ultimately led to the departure of manager Sánchez Flores before the conclusion of the season, who was replaced with ex-Sevilla manager Gregorio Manzano.

=== Simeone revolution and revival of Atlético success (2011–2025) ===
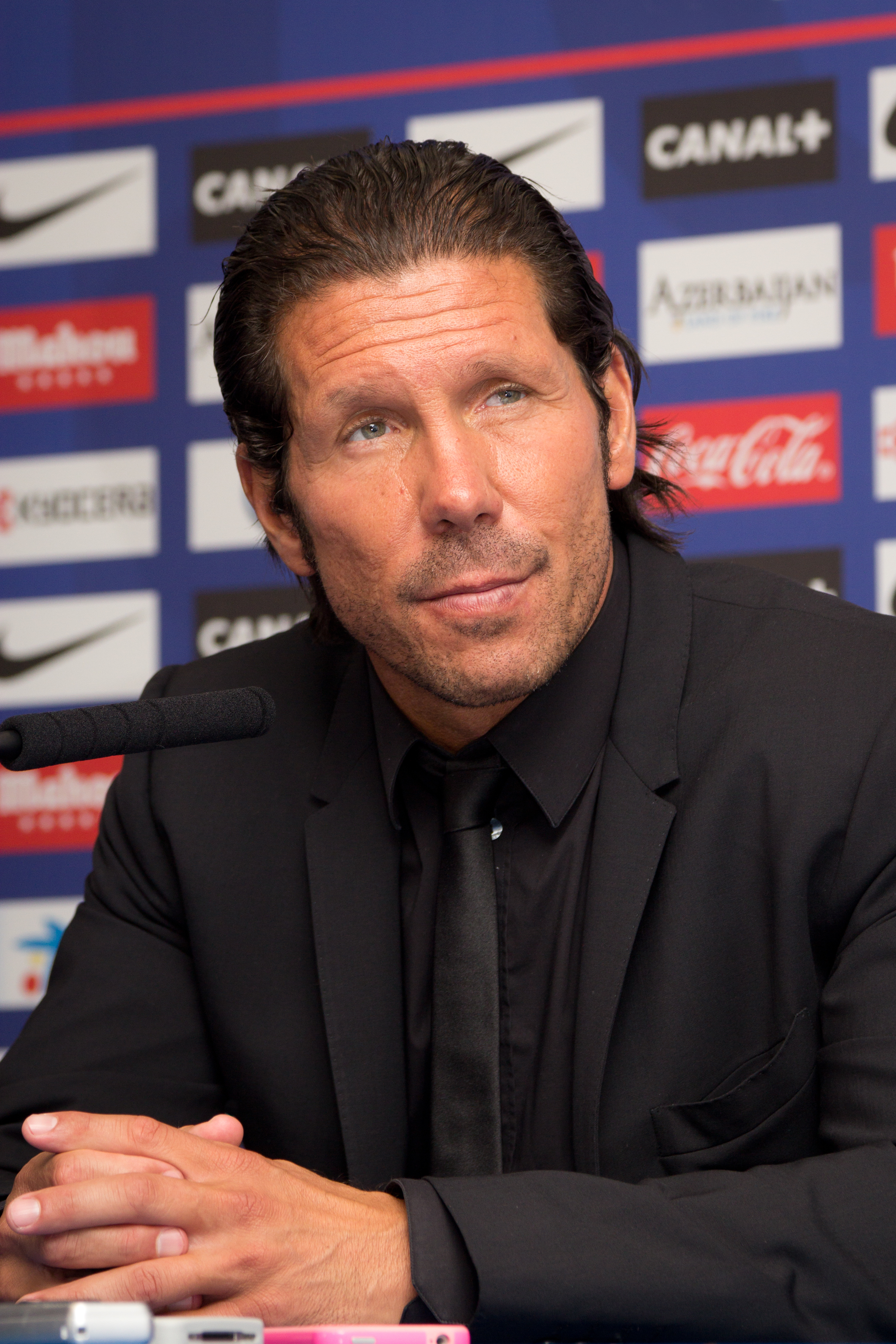
Diego Simeone has led the club to two UEFA Champions League finals

On 23 December 2011, Atlético appointed their Argentine former player Diego Simeone as manager in place of Manzano. The club were in a period of uncertainty, having appointed five managers in less than three years and allowing young talents, namely Agüero and de Gea, to leave for the Premier League. The team was sitting 10th in La Liga at the time of Simeone's appointment, after losing four of their last five games. The appointment of Simeone was seen as a risk, who was relatively inexperienced and previously only had European managerial experience with Italian underdogs Catania. However, he swiftly transformed Atlético into a formidable force. As a player, Simeone was known as a fierce, all-action midfielder; he brought the same relentless, win-at-all-costs mentality to Atlético as manager. His focus was on building a strong defence, anchored by teenage Chelsea loanee goalkeeper Thibaut Courtois and Uruguayan centre-back Diego Godín. The results were immediate, as Simeone's first six games in charge featured six clean sheets. According to Spanish football writer Andy West, Atlético fans came to quickly to embrace Simeone, especially in light of his role as a pivotal player in their 1995-96 league and cup double.

Simeone led Atlético to their second Europa League win in the three years since its creation; Atlético beat Athletic Bilbao 3–0 in the final on 9 May 2012 at National Arena in Bucharest with two goals from Radamel Falcao and one from Diego. By winning the Europa League again, Atlético qualified for the 2012 UEFA Super Cup against Chelsea, winners of the previous season's Champions League. The game was played at the Stade Louis II, Monaco on 31 August 2012; Atlético won 4–1, including a hat-trick by Falcao in the first half. On 17 May 2013, Atlético beat Real Madrid 2–1 in the Copa del Rey final in a tense match where both teams finished with ten men. This ended a 14-year and 25-match winless streak in the Madrid derby. The 2012–13 season saw the club finish with three trophies in a little over a year. On 17 May 2014, a 1–1 draw at the Camp Nou against Barcelona secured the La Liga title for Atlético, their first since 1996, and the first titles since 2003–04 not won by Barcelona or Real Madrid. One week later, Atlético faced city rivals Real Madrid in their first Champions League final since 1974, and the first played between two sides from the same city. They took a first-half lead through Godín and led until the third minute of injury time, when Sergio Ramos headed in an equaliser from a corner; the match went to extra time, and Real ultimately won 4–1.

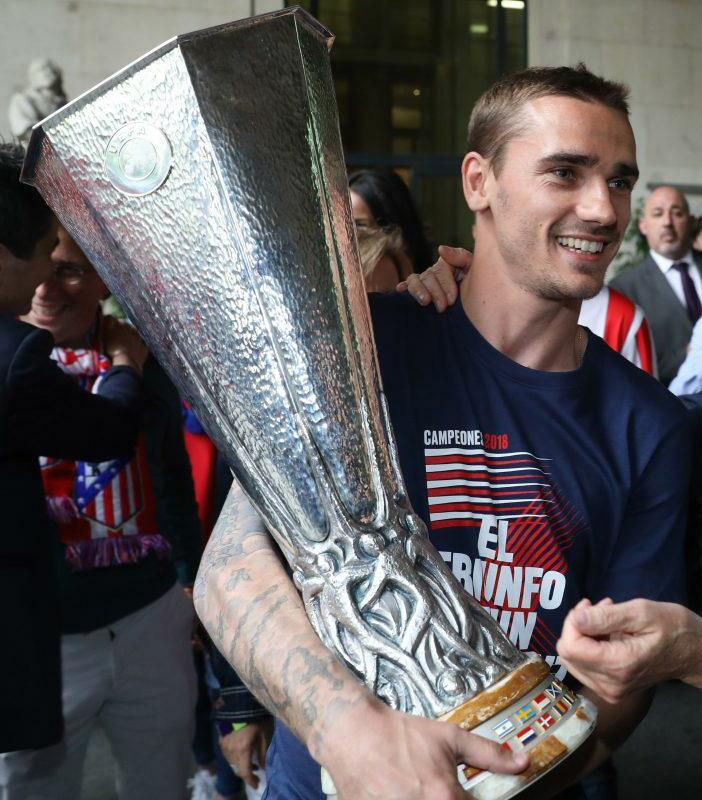
Antoine Griezmann, Atlético's all-time top scorer, with the UEFA Europa League trophy in 2018

Antoine Griezmann, who had a standout season in La Liga and featured at the 2014 FIFA World Cup, joined Atlético from Real Sociedad on 28 July 2014. During his first stint with the club, Griezmann was Atlético's top scorer for five consecutive seasons. He established himself as a world-class player at Atlético, also shining on the international stage as he finished as the top scorer at UEFA Euro 2016 and earned the tournament's best player award. That same year, he placed third in the Ballon d'Or rankings, behind Lionel Messi and Cristiano Ronaldo. Atlético reached a second Champions League final in three seasons in 2015–16, again facing Real Madrid, and lost on penalties after a 1–1 draw. The club played their last home game at the Vicente Calderón Stadium on 21 May 2017, thereby moving to a new home, the refurbished Wanda Metropolitano in eastern Madrid. In 2018, they won their third Europa League title in nine years by beating Marseille 3–0 in the finals at the Stade de Lyon in Lyon, courtesy of a brace from Griezmann and a goal from club captain Gabi in what would be his last match for the club. Atlético also won another UEFA Super Cup after beating Real Madrid 4–2 at the outset of the following season at the Lilleküla Arena in Tallinn.

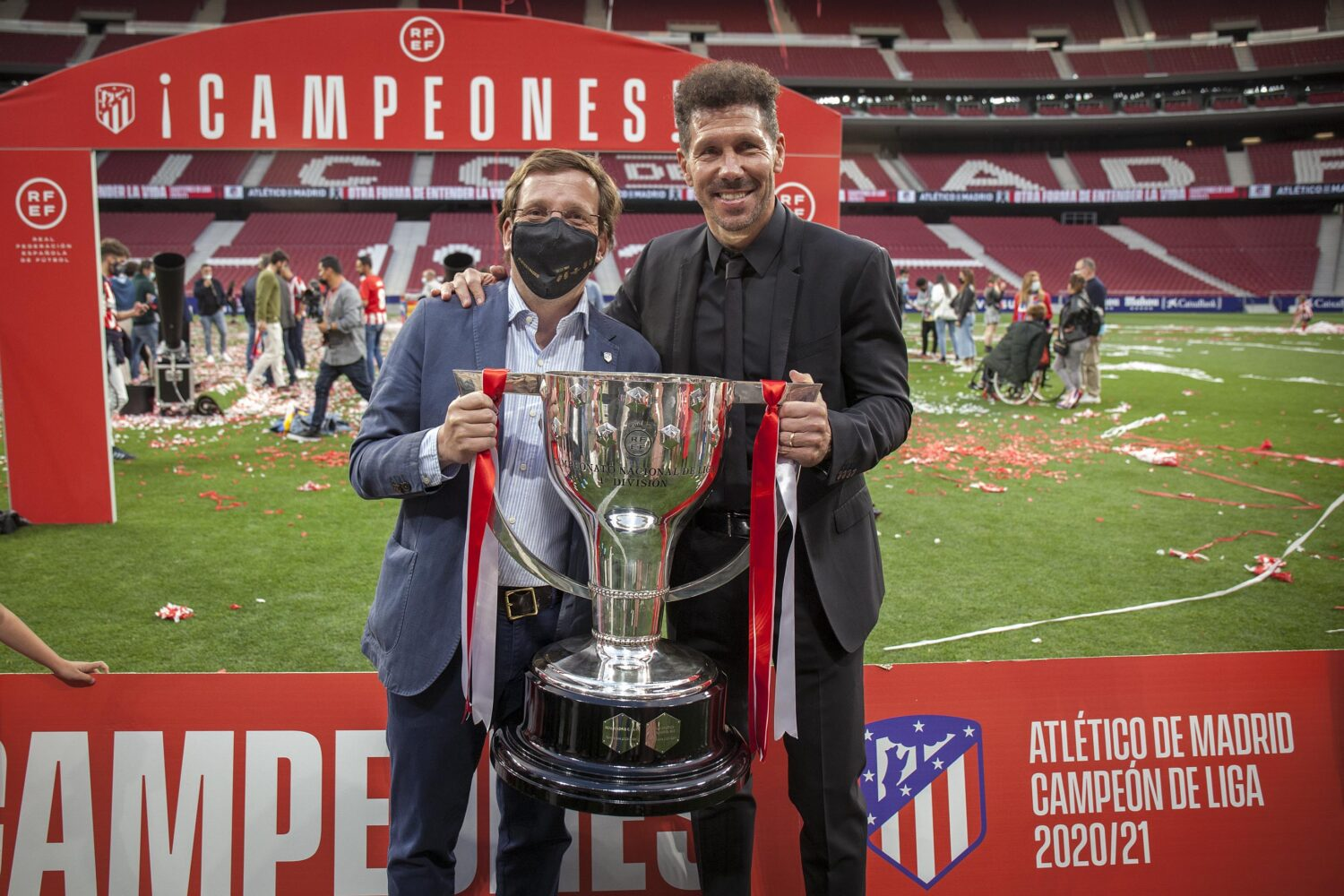
Simeone celebrating the La Liga title win in 2021

On 25 September 2020, Atlético signed Luis Suárez from Barcelona. One of the world's best strikers, Suárez made a dramatic impact at the club, as he played a pivotal role in their unexpected La Liga title triumph, seven years after the 2013–14 win. He scored 17 goals in his first 19 La Liga matches, helping Atlético establish a 10-point lead by January. Although the team wavered later in the season, Suárez's relentless competitive drive proved decisive, as he netted crucial goals in the final two games to secure the title. The final game of the title-winning season was on 22 May 2021, a 2–1 win at the José Zorrilla Stadium against Valladolid. On April 16, 2024, the team qualified to the 2025 FIFA Club World Cup for first time in club's history, despite being eliminated in the 2023–24 Champions League, as Barcelona were also eliminated, and Atlético were the higher ranked Spanish club in the UEFA four-year ranking.

=== Apollo Sports Capital era (2026–present) ===
On 12 March 2026, Atletico Madrid announced that Apollo Sports Capital had completed the acquisition of a majority stake in the club.

== Recent seasons ==
Statistics from the previous decade. For a full history see; List of Atlético Madrid seasons

Year	Domestic League	Level	Pld	W	D	L	GF	GA	GD	Pts	Position	King's Cup	UEFA Champions League	UEFA Europa League	Average attendance
2012–13	La Liga	1	38	23	7	8	65	31	+34	76	3rd of 20	W	-	R32	44,296
2013–14	La Liga	1	38	28	6	4	77	26	+51	90	1st of 20	SF	RU	-	46,247
2014–15	La Liga	1	38	23	9	6	67	29	+38	78	3rd of 20	QF	QF	-	46,532
2015–16	La Liga	1	38	28	4	6	63	18	+45	88	3rd of 20	QF	RU	-	47,113
2016–17	La Liga	1	38	23	9	6	70	27	+43	78	3rd of 20	SF	SF	-	44,710
2017–18	La Liga	1	38	23	10	5	58	22	+36	79	2nd of 20	QF	GS	W	55,483
2018–19	La Liga	1	38	22	10	6	55	29	+26	76	2nd of 20	R16	R16	-	56,074
2019–20	La Liga	1	38	18	16	4	51	27	+24	70	3rd of 20	R32	QF	-	57,198
2020–21	La Liga	1	38	26	8	4	67	25	+42	86	1st of 20	R2	R16	-	N/A
2021–22	La Liga	1	38	21	8	9	65	43	+22	71	3rd of 20	R16	QF	-	N/A
2022–23	La Liga	1	38	23	8	7	70	33	+37	77	3rd of 20	QF	GS	-	55,800
2023–24	La Liga	1	38	24	4	10	70	43	+27	76	4th of 20	SF	QF	-	59.731
2024–25	La Liga	1	38	22	10	6	68	30	+38	76	3rd of 20	SF	R16	-	60,883
2025–26	La Liga	1	38	21	6	11	62	44	+18	69	4th of 20	RU	SF	-	

- Seasons spent at Level 1 of the Spanish League system (La Liga): 89
- Seasons spent at Level 2 of the Spanish League system (Segunda División): 6

== Rivalries ==
=== Real Madrid ===
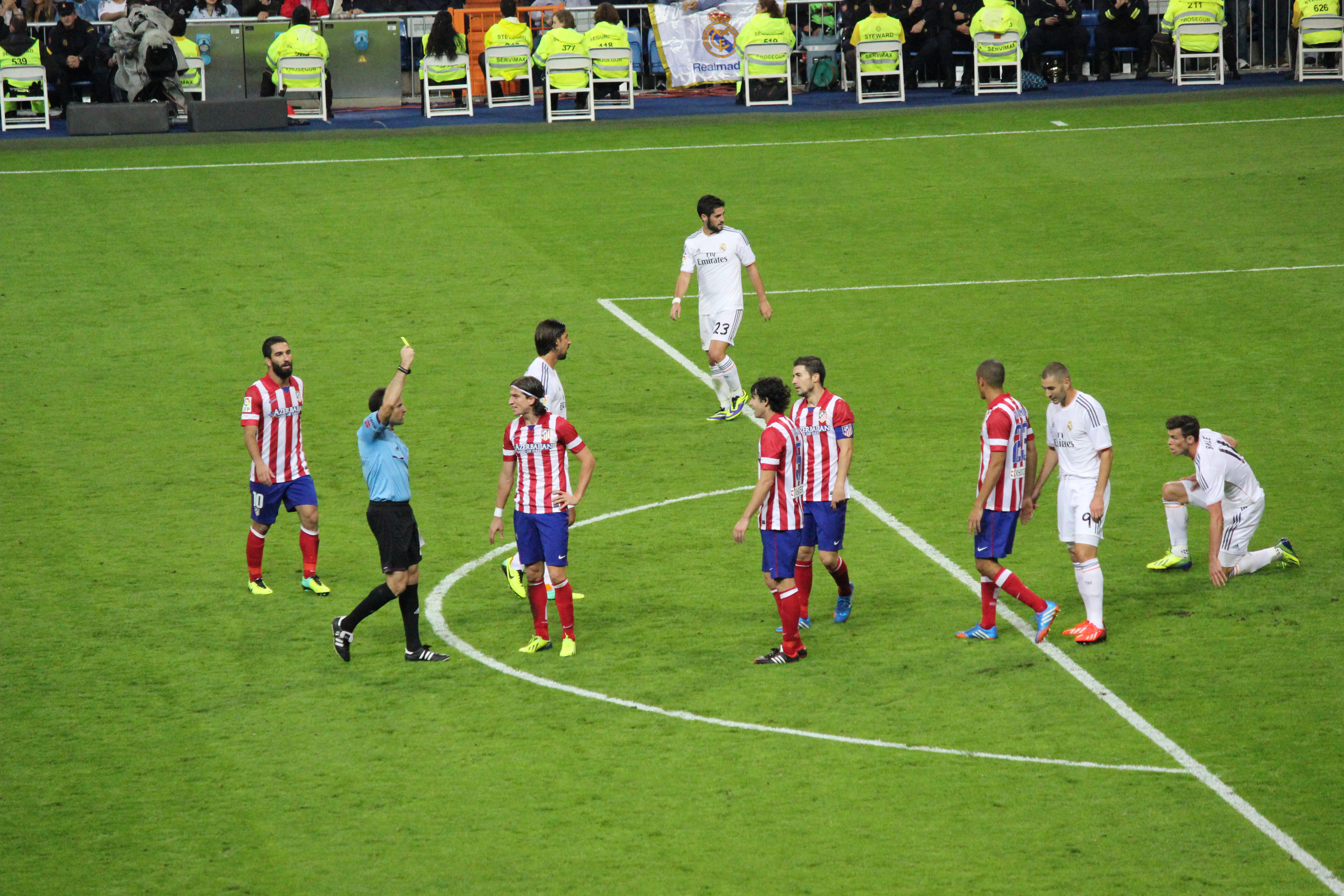
Madrid derby in 2014

Real Madrid and Atlético Madrid are clubs with contrasting identities and different fates. While Real Madrid's Santiago Bernabéu proudly rises on the Paseo de la Castellana in the wealthy Chamartín neighbourhood of northern Madrid, Atlético's former stadium, the less glamorous Vicente Calderón, stood in the central-south of Madrid 1.8 km from the city center in the working class barrio of Arganzuela. Historically, Real Madrid have long been seen as the establishment club. On the other side, Atlético Madrid were always characterized by a sentimiento de rebeldía, a sense of rebellion. They were associated with the military airforce (renamed Atlético Aviación), until the regime's preferences moved towards Real Madrid in the 1950s.

Certainly, the dictatorial state sought to make political capital out of Real Madrid's European Cup trophies at a time when Spain was internationally isolated; "Real Madrid are the best embassy we ever had", said Franco's foreign minister Fernando Maria de Castiella. Such perceptions have had an important impact on the city's footballing identities, tapping into the collective consciousness. In this vein, Atlético fans were probably the originators, and are the most frequent singers, of the song, sung to the tune of the Real Madrid anthem, "Hala Madrid, hala Madrid, el equipo del gobierno, la vergüenza del país", "Go Madrid, go Madrid, the government's team, the country's shame."

Until recently, Atlético Madrid had struggled significantly in the derby, carrying a 14-year winless streak into the 2012–13 season. This spell ended, however, on 17 May 2013 after Atlético beat their city rivals 2–1 at the Santiago Bernabéu in the 2013 Copa del Rey finals, and continued on 29 September 2013 when they won a 1–0 victory, again at the Bernabéu.

The two faced each other in the 2014 and 2016 UEFA Champions League finals, with Real Madrid winning both matches.

=== Barcelona ===
Although less famous than the Derbi Madrileño, a historic rivalry exists between Atlético Madrid and Barcelona, which is also considered one of the "Classics" of Spanish football. Once lopsided in favor of the Catalan club, this rivalry has become competitive since the early 2010s, marked by events such as the 2016 Champions League knockout phase where Atlético Madrid upset Barcelona, the controversial departure of French striker Antoine Griezmann from the Madrid club to the Catalan club in 2019 (and his subsequent return in 2021 amid Barcelona's financial struggles), and the surprise move of Luis Suárez to Atlético in 2020, a move which saw the Uruguayan star play a crucial role in the team's championship run. However, by tradition and current affairs, the greatest rivalry is that which exists with its "merengues" neighbors.

== Honours ==
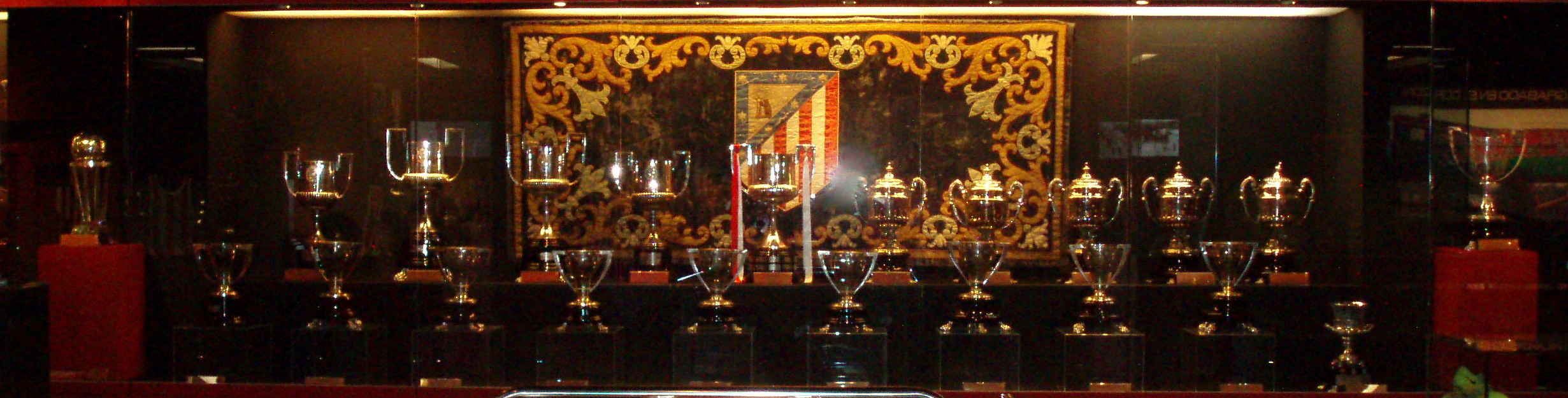
Trophy cabinet

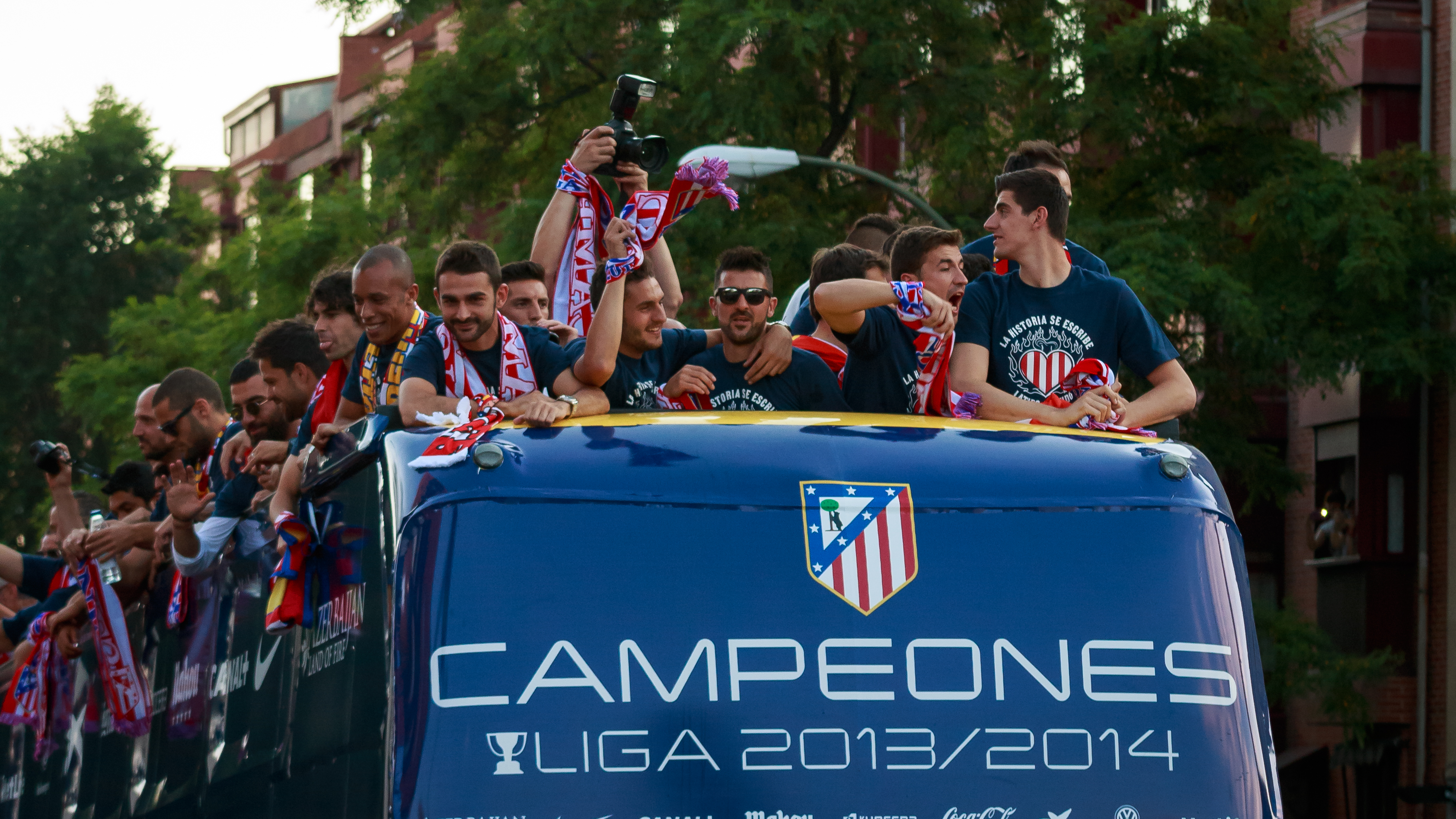
Celebrations of Atlético Madrid after winning the 2013–14 La Liga title

Type	Competition	Titles	Seasons
Domestic	La Liga	11	1939–40, 1940–41, 1949–50, 1950–51, 1965–66, 1969–70, 1972–73, 1976–77, 1995–96, 2013–14, 2020–21
Domestic	Segunda División	1	2001–02
Domestic	Copa del Rey	10	1959–60, 1960–61, 1964–65, 1971–72, 1975–76, 1984–85, 1990–91, 1991–92, 1995–96, 2012–13
Domestic	Supercopa de España	2	1985, 2014
Domestic	Copa Presidente FEF	1	1941–47
Domestic	Copa Eva Duarte	1	1951
Continental	UEFA Europa League	3	2009–10, 2011–12, 2017–18
Continental	European Cup Winners' Cup	1	1961–62
Continental	UEFA Super Cup	3	2010, 2012, 2018
Worldwide	Intercontinental Cup	1	1974

- record
- ^{s} shared record

=== Awards & recognitions ===
- Copa Stadium (Spain's oldest National Sport Award): 1962 (Note: Copa Stadium winners since 1923)
- Gold Medal (Royal Order of Sports Merit): 2014
- Globe Soccer Special Award: 2014
- Globe Soccer Best Club of the Year: 2012, 2018
- IFFHS The World's Club Team of the Year: 2018

== International competition record ==
Atlético has played at the European stage regularly since its 1958–59 European Cup debut, subsequently entering the European Cup Winners' Cup (1961–62), the Inter-Cities Fairs Cup (1963–64), the UEFA Cup (1971–72) and the UEFA Super Cup (2009–10). Starting with the 1999–2000 relegation, Atlético did not qualify for European competition for seven years, but from the 2007–08 season, it has taken part in either the Champions League or the UEFA Europa League every year, enjoying success in both competitions.

Atlético Madrid's season-by-season record in international competition
^{1} Group stage. Highest-ranked eliminated team in case of qualification, lowest-ranked qualified team in case of elimination.
Intercontinental Cup / FIFA Club World Cup
Season	Group stage		Round of 16	Quarter-finals	Semi-finals	Final		
1974–75						(Argentina) Independiente		
2025	(Brazil) Botafogo ^{1}							
UEFA Super Cup
Season	Final							
2010	(Italy) Inter Milan							
2012	(England) Chelsea							
2018	(Spain) Real Madrid							
European Cup / UEFA Champions League
Season	Preliminary Rounds		Group Stage / League Phase	Round of 32 / Knockout phase PO	Round of 16	Quarter-finals	Semi-finals	Final
1958–59				(Republic of Ireland) Drumcondra	(Bulgaria) CSKA Sofia	(West Germany) Schalke 04	(Spain) Real Madrid	
1966–67				(Sweden) Malmö FF	(Socialist Federal Republic of Yugoslavia) Vojvodina			
1970–71				Austria Wien	(Italy) Cagliari	(Poland) Legia Warsaw	(Netherlands) Ajax	
1973–74				(Turkey) Galatasaray	(Romania) Dinamo București	(Socialist Federal Republic of Yugoslavia) Red Star Belgrade	(Scotland) Celtic	(West Germany) Bayern Munich
1977–78				(Romania) Dinamo București	(France) Nantes	(Belgium) Club Brugge		
1996–97			(Poland) Widzew Łódź ^{1}	—N/a	—N/a	(Netherlands) Ajax		
2008–09		(Germany) Schalke 04	(France) Marseille ^{1}	—N/a	(Portugal) Porto			
2009–10		(Greece) Panathinaikos	(Portugal) Porto ^{1}					
2013–14			(Portugal) Porto ^{1}	—N/a	(Italy) Milan	(Spain) Barcelona	(England) Chelsea	(Spain) Real Madrid
2014–15			(Greece) Olympiacos ^{1}	—N/a	(Germany) Bayer Leverkusen	(Spain) Real Madrid		
2015–16			(Turkey) Galatasaray ^{1}	—N/a	(Netherlands) PSV Eindhoven	(Spain) Barcelona	(Germany) Bayern Munich	(Spain) Real Madrid
2016–17			(Russia) Rostov ^{1}	—N/a	(Germany) Bayer Leverkusen	(England) Leicester City	(Spain) Real Madrid	
2017–18			(England) Chelsea ^{1}					
2018–19			(Belgium) Club Brugge ^{1}	—N/a	(Italy) Juventus			
2019–20			(Russia) Lokomotiv Moscow ^{1}	—N/a	(England) Liverpool	(Germany) RB Leipzig		
2020–21			(Austria) Red Bull Salzburg ^{1}	—N/a	(England) Chelsea			
2021–22			(Portugal) Porto ^{1}	—N/a	(England) Manchester United	(England) Manchester City		
2022–23			(Belgium) Club Brugge ^{1}					
2023–24			(Netherlands) Feyenoord ^{1}	—N/a	(Italy) Inter Milan	(Germany) Borussia Dortmund		
2024–25			(Croatia) Dinamo Zagreb ^{1}	Bye	(Spain) Real Madrid			
2025–26			(France) Marseille ^{1}	(Belgium) Club Brugge	(England) Tottenham Hotspur	(Spain) Barcelona	(England) Arsenal	
European Cup Winners' Cup
Season	Preliminary Rounds			Round of 32	Round of 16	Quarter-finals	Semi-finals	Final
1961–62				(France) Sedan	(England) Leicester City	(West Germany) Werder Bremen	(East Germany) Carl Zeiss Jena	(Italy) Fiorentina
1962–63					(Malta) Hibernians	(Bulgaria) Botev	(West Germany) 1. FC Nürnberg	(England) Tottenham Hotspur
1965–66				(Socialist Federal Republic of Yugoslavia) Dinamo Zagreb	(Romania) Universitatea Cluj	(West Germany) Borussia Dortmund		
1972–73				(France) Bastia	(Soviet Union) Spartak Moscow			
1975–76				(Switzerland) Basel	(West Germany) Eintracht Frankfurt			
1976–77				(Austria) Rapid Wien	(Socialist Federal Republic of Yugoslavia) Hajduk Split	(Bulgaria) Levski Sofia	(West Germany) Hamburger SV	
1985–86				(Scotland) Celtic	(Wales) Bangor City	(Socialist Federal Republic of Yugoslavia) Red Star Belgrade	(West Germany) Uerdingen	(Soviet Union) Dynamo Kyiv
1991–92				(Norway) Fyllingen	(England) Manchester United	(Belgium) Club Brugge		
1992–93				(Slovenia) Maribor	(Turkey) Trabzonspor	(Greece) Olympiacos	(Italy) Parma	
Inter-Cities Fairs Cup / UEFA Cup / UEFA Europa League
Season	Preliminary Rounds		Group Stage	Round of 32	Round of 16	Quarter-finals	Semi-finals	Final
1963–64				(Portugal) Porto	(Italy) Juventus			
1964–65		(Switzerland) Servette	—N/a	(Republic of Ireland) Shelbourne	(Belgium) RFC Liège	Bye	(Italy) Juventus	
1967–68		(Austria) Wiener SC	—N/a	(Turkey) Göztepe				
1968–69		(Belgium) Waregem						
1971–72		(Greece) Panionios						
1974–75		(Denmark) KB	—N/a	(England) Derby County				
1979–80		(East Germany) Dynamo Dresden						
1981–82		(Portugal) Boavista						
1983–84		(Netherlands) Groningen						
1984–85		(Switzerland) Sion						
1986–87		(West Germany) Werder Bremen	—N/a	(Portugal) Vitória de Guimarães				
1988–89		(Netherlands) Groningen						
1989–90		(Italy) Fiorentina						
1990–91		(Romania) Politehnica Timișoara						
1993–94		(Scotland) Heart of Midlothian	—N/a	(Greece) OFI				
1997–98		(England) Leicester City	—N/a	(Greece) PAOK	(Croatia) Dinamo Zagreb	(England) Aston Villa	(Italy) Lazio	
1998–99		(Serbia and Montenegro) Obilic	—N/a	(Bulgaria) CSKA Sofia	(Spain) Real Sociedad	(Italy) Roma	(Italy) Parma	
1999–2000	(Turkey) Ankaragücü	(Poland) Amica	—N/a	(Germany) VfL Wolfsburg	(France) Lens			
2007–08	(Serbia) Vojvodina	(Turkey) Erciyesspor	(Denmark) Copenhagen ^{1}	(England) Bolton Wanderers				
2009–10				(Turkey) Galatasaray	(Portugal) Sporting CP	(Spain) Valencia	(England) Liverpool	(England) Fulham
2010–11			(Greece) Aris ^{1}					
2011–12	(Norway) Strømsgodset	(Portugal) Vitória de Guimarães	(Scotland) Celtic ^{1}	(Italy) Lazio	(Turkey) Beşiktaş	(Germany) Hannover 96	(Spain) Valencia	(Spain) Athletic Bilbao
2012–13			(Portugal) Académica ^{1}	(Russia) Rubin Kazan				
2017–18				(Denmark) Copenhagen	(Russia) Lokomotiv Moscow	(Portugal) Sporting CP	(England) Arsenal	(France) Marseille
UEFA Intertoto Cup
Season	Quarter-finals	Semi-finals	Finals					
2004–05	(Czech Republic) Fastav Zlín	(Serbia and Montenegro) OFK Beograd	(Spain) Villarreal					
2007–08			(Romania) Gloria Bistrița					

=== UEFA club coefficient ranking ===
As of 2 June 2025

Rank	Team	Points
13	(Germany) Bayer Leverkusen	95.250
14	(Spain) Atlético Madrid	93.00
15	(Portugal) Benfica	87.750

== Players ==
Spanish teams are limited to three players without EU citizenship. The squad list includes only the principal nationality of each player; several non-European players on the squad have dual citizenship with an EU country. Also, players from the ACP countries in Africa, the Caribbean, and the Pacific that are signatories to the Cotonou Agreement are not counted against non-EU quotas due to the Kolpak ruling.

=== Current squad ===
As of 24 October 2026

Note: Flags indicate national team as defined under FIFA eligibility rules; some limited exceptions apply. Players may hold more than one non-FIFA nationality.

No.	Pos.	Nation	Player
1	GK	ARG	Juan Musso
3	MF	MEX	Obed Vargas
4	MF	ESP	Rodrigo Mendoza
5	MF	USA	Johnny Cardoso
6	MF	ESP	Koke (captain)
7	MF	KOR	Lee Kang-in
8	MF	ESP	Pablo Barrios
9	FW	NOR	Alexander Sørloth
10	MF	ESP	Álex Baena
11	FW	NGR	Ademola Lookman
13	GK	SLO	Jan Oblak (vice-captain)
14	DF	ESP	Marcos Llorente (3rd captain)

No.	Pos.	Nation	Player
15	FW	CAN	Jonathan David (on loan from Juventus)
16	MF	ESP	Arnau Ortiz
17	DF	SVK	Dávid Hancko
18	DF	ESP	Marc Pubill
19	FW	ARG	Julián Alvarez
20	MF	ARG	Giuliano Simeone
21	DF	ARG	Cristian Romero
22	DF	ESP	Alejandro Grimaldo
23	MF	DEN	Morten Hjulmand
24	DF	ESP	Robin Le Normand
25	GK	ESP	Salvi Esquivel
30	DF	ESP	Dani Martínez

=== Reserve team ===
Note: Flags indicate national team as defined under FIFA eligibility rules; some limited exceptions apply. Players may hold more than one non-FIFA nationality.

No.	Pos.	Nation	Player
27	DF	ESP	Jorge Domínguez
29	FW	ESP	Miguel Cubo

No.	Pos.	Nation	Player
45	DF	ESP	Javi Gil (on loan from Juventus)
46	MF	ESP	Jorge Castillo

=== Out on loan ===
Note: Flags indicate national team as defined under FIFA eligibility rules; some limited exceptions apply. Players may hold more than one non-FIFA nationality.

No.	Pos.	Nation	Player
—	GK	ROU	Horațiu Moldovan (at Eyüpspor until 30 June 2027)
—	DF	URU	José María Giménez (at Deportivo A Coruña until 30 June 2027)
—	DF	FRA	Clément Lenglet (at Benfica until 30 June 2027)

No.	Pos.	Nation	Player
—	MF	FRA	Thomas Lemar (at Elche until 30 June 2027)
—	FW	ESP	Carlos Martín (at Hajduk Split until 30 June 2027)

== Staff ==
=== Technical staff ===
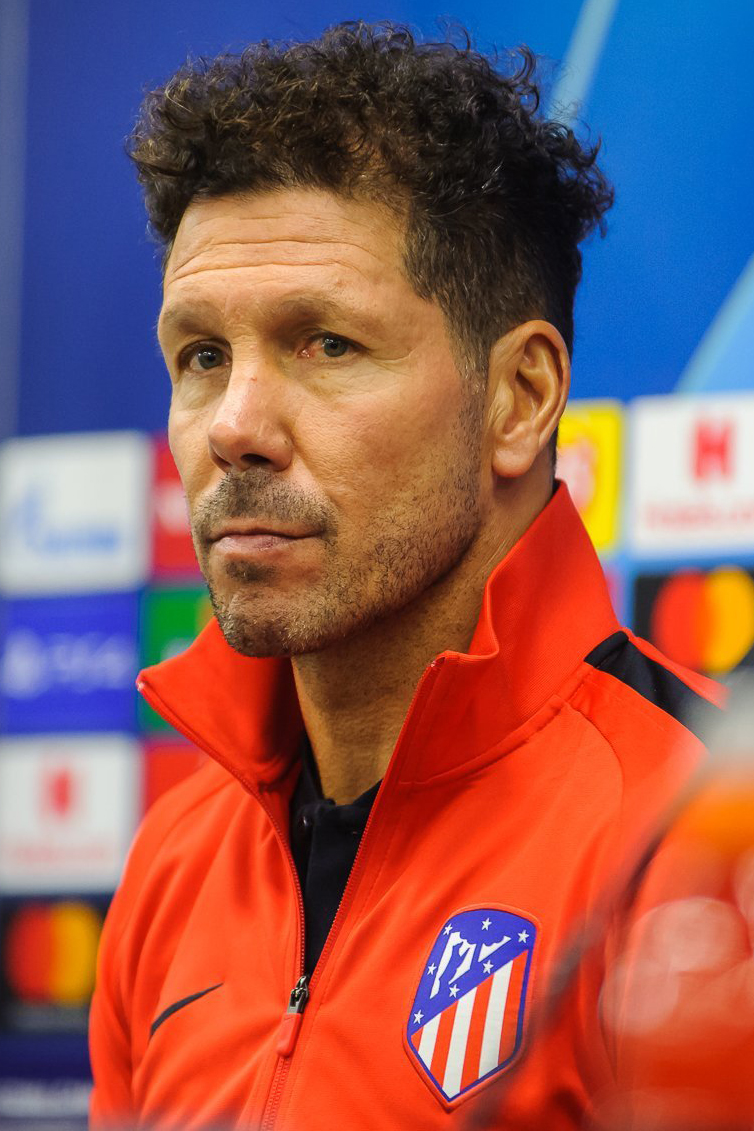
Diego Simeone, head coach since 23 December 2011

Position	Staff
Head coach	(Argentina) Diego Simeone
Assistant coach	(Spain) Gabi
Assistant coach	(Argentina) Gustavo López
Assistant coach	(Argentina) Hernán Bonvicini
Goalkeeper coach	(Argentina) Pablo Vercellone
Fitness coach	(Spain) Luis Piñedo
Fitness coach	(Spain) Juan Ángel Piñero
Fitness coach	(Spain) Óscar Pitillas
Analyst	(Spain) Jorge Romero
Physiotherapist	(Spain) Gorka de Abajo
Physiotherapist	(Spain) Carlos Garcia Valcarcel
Physiotherapist	(Spain) Miguel Ángel Lobo
Physiotherapist	(Spain) Esteban Arévalo
Physiotherapist	(Spain) David Marrón Gómez
Physiotherapist	(Spain) Jesús Vázquez
Rehabilitation physio	(Spain) Alfredo Jarodich
Technical assistant team	(Spain) David Castro
Team delegate	(Spain) Pedro Pablo
Team delegate	(Spain) Óscar Cáceres Ranz
Head of medical department	(Spain) José María Villalón
Doctor	(Spain) Óscar Celada
Equipment staff	(Spain) Cristian Bautista
Equipment staff	(Spain) José Ignacio Gallart
Equipment staff	(Spain) Fernando Sánchez Ramírez
Equipment staff	(Spain) Mario Serrano
Equipment staff	(Spain) Tanausú Baeza Sierra

Source: Atlético Madrid

== Ownership ==
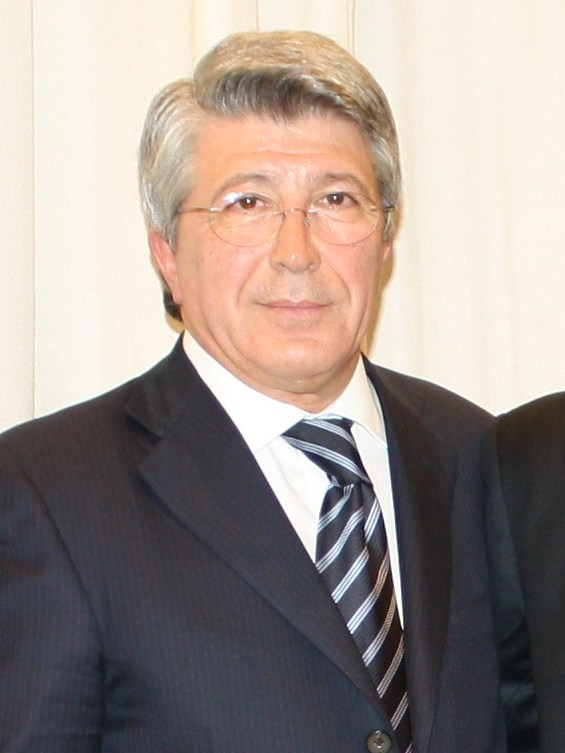
Enrique Cerezo, current president of Atlético

In 1992, Spain's new Sports Law forced all First and Second Division football clubs to convert into sports limited companies. Atlético Madrid, led by president Jesús Gil since 1987, was teetering on the edge of bankruptcy. On the final day to comply, the club scraped together enough capital to meet the requirements. Days later, Gil and then–vice president Enrique Cerezo quietly seized control of the club without paying a single peseta. The maneuver was fraudulent, but it would take seven years for the so‑called Caso Atlético to reach court.

In 1999, Gil, Cerezo, and then‑director general Miguel Ángel Gil were charged with fraud and embezzlement. The courts confirmed the crimes — but the statute of limitations had already expired. As a result, the shares remained in their hands, and the club's ownership structure, born of a legal sleight of hand, was never undone.

Since 2003, Cerezo has served as the club's president, while Miguel Ángel Gil Marín — son of former president Jesús Gil — has held the role of chief executive officer.

In 2015, the Chinese conglomerate Wanda Group purchased a 17% stake in Atlético Madrid. In 2017, Quantum Pacific Group, owned by Israeli billionaire Idan Ofer, acquired a 15% stake in the club. The following year, Wanda Group sold its entire holding to Quantum Pacific Group, raising the latter's ownership to 32%.

After a 2021 capital increase, Gil Marín, Cerezo, and incoming investor Ares Management hold 66.98% of the shares through 'Atlético HoldCo'.

In November 2025, it was announced that Apollo Sports Capital, a United States-based investment firm, would acquire a controlling stake in the club. The agreement valued the club at approximately €2.2 billion. Additionally, it was confirmed that CEO Miguel Ángel Gil and president Enrique Cerezo would retain their respective roles following the acquisition. The transaction was finalized in March 2026.

== Overseas properties ==
Atlético co-owns Liga MX club Atlético San Luis, and the Canadian Premier League side Atlético Ottawa. The club also co-owned the Indian Super League (ISL) franchise in Kolkata, formerly named Atlético de Kolkata, which won the competition twice, but in 2017 ended its partnership with the club as Sanjiv Goenka bought its shares.

In October 2018, Atletico De Madrid announced their first academy in Pakistan which was based in Lahore, which was the first European football academy in Pakistan. In April 2019, they launched "Football School Program" in Lahore. In October 2019, Atletico De Madrid conducted talents in Lahore. In February 2020, Pakistan Football Federation announced the 2020–21 Football Federation League in which Atletico Madrid Lahore was included in Group C and was made a professional Pakistani football club. It made its debut against Hazara Coal and won by 2–0.

In November 2026, Atlético de Madrid announced the acquisition of a 50% stake in the Ecuadorian club Atlético Fútbol Club.

== Finances ==
In the 2016–17 season, Atlético Madrid generated revenue of €272.5 million, making it the third-highest-grossing football club in Spain. The club ranked 13th worldwide in this category. In the 2023–24 season, it ranked 12th in Europe with €409.5 million.

== Colours and badge ==
Atlético's home kit is red and white vertical striped shirts, blue shorts, and blue and red socks. This combination has been used since 1910.

The club's badge which was firstly introduced in 1917 featuring the Coat of arms of Madrid, then incorporated into the club's jersey from 1947, was remodeled in 2016, yet a vote on 30 June 2023 revealed that 88.68% of club members wanted to reinstate the historical badge, which would be represented on 1 July 2024.

== Nicknames ==
Throughout their history the club has been known by a number of nicknames, including Los Colchoneros ("The Mattress Makers"), due to their first team stripes being the same colours as traditional mattresses. During the 1970s, they became known as Los Indios, which some attribute to the club's signing several South American players after the restrictions on signing foreign players were lifted. However, there are a number of alternative theories which claim they were named so because their stadium was "camped" on the river bank, or because Los Indios (The Indians) were the traditional enemy of Los Blancos (The Whites), which is the nickname of the club's city rivals, Real Madrid. Felipe VI, the king of Spain, has been the honorary president of the club since 2003.

== Stadium and facility ==
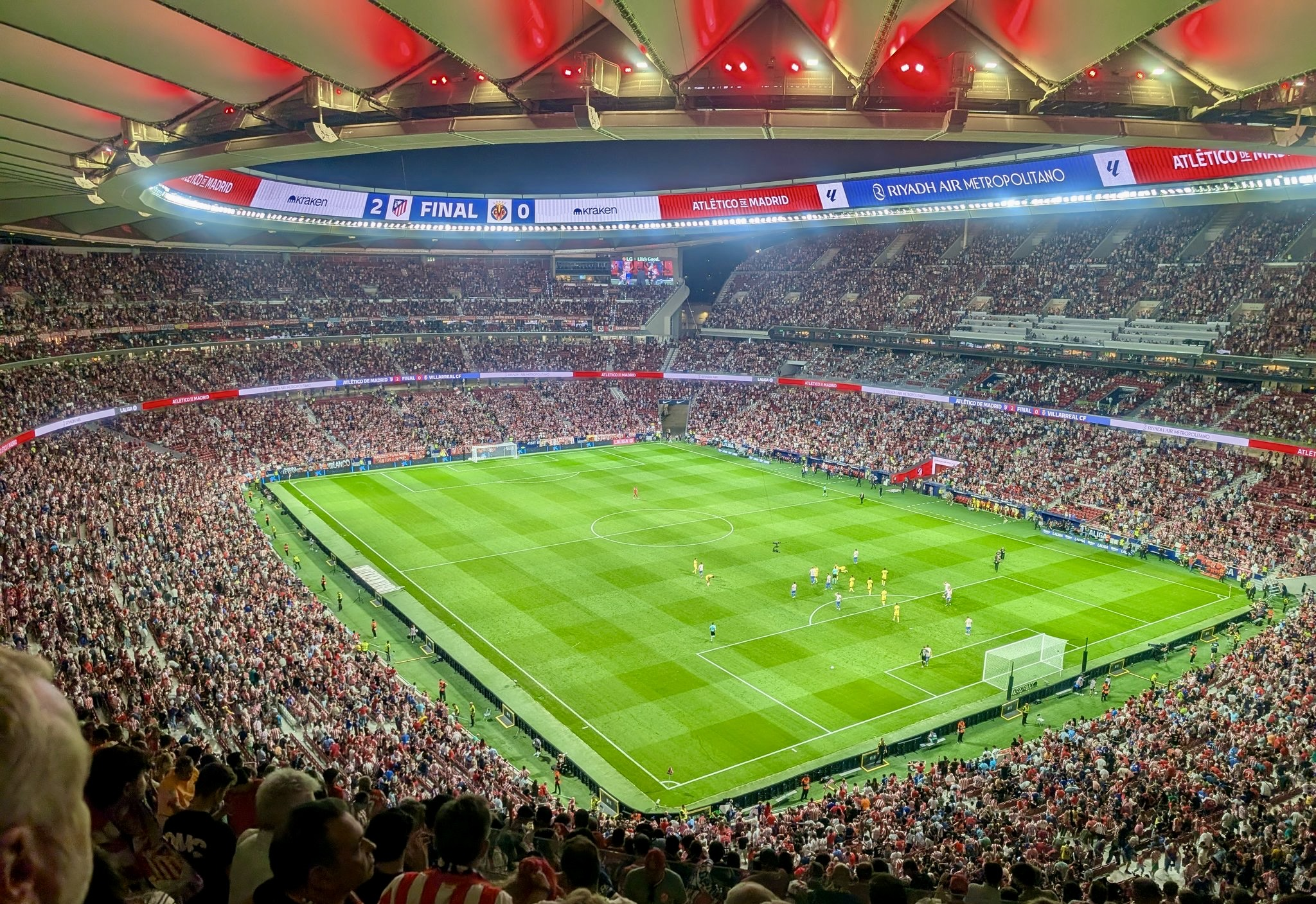
Metropolitano Stadium

The club plays home fixtures in the Riyadh Air Metropolitano, which was expanded from a 20,000 seat capacity (when it was known as La Peineta) to 70,813 after it was used for Madrid's failed bid to host the 2016 Summer Olympic. Following the renovation of the stadium, the refurbished venue hosted its first competitive match pitting Atlético against Málaga, in which Antoine Griezmann scored the club's first goal at the stadium.

=== Training ground ===
The club's training ground is the Ciudad Deportiva Atlético de Madrid in Majadahonda, around 20 km west of Madrid. The facility maintains grass and artificial pitches as well as a gym. Both the senior and youth squads train at the club-owned facilities.

Atlético also runs a sports academy at the Ciudad Deportiva del Nuevo Cerro del Espino in Majadahonda. The club also runs an academy in Bucharest, Romania, its first in Europe.

== Kit suppliers and shirt sponsors ==
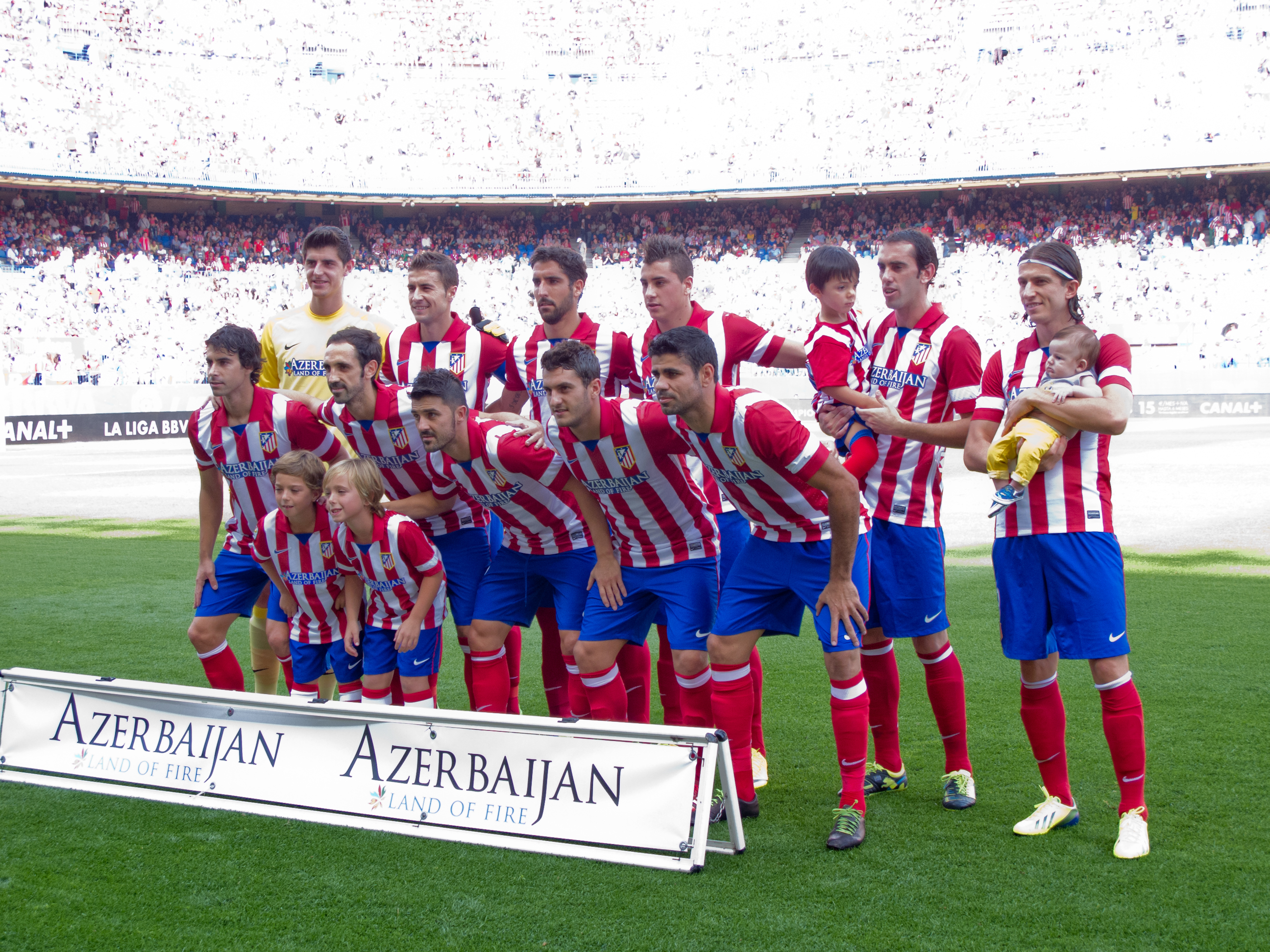
Atlético players with kits stating "Azerbaijan Land of Fire"

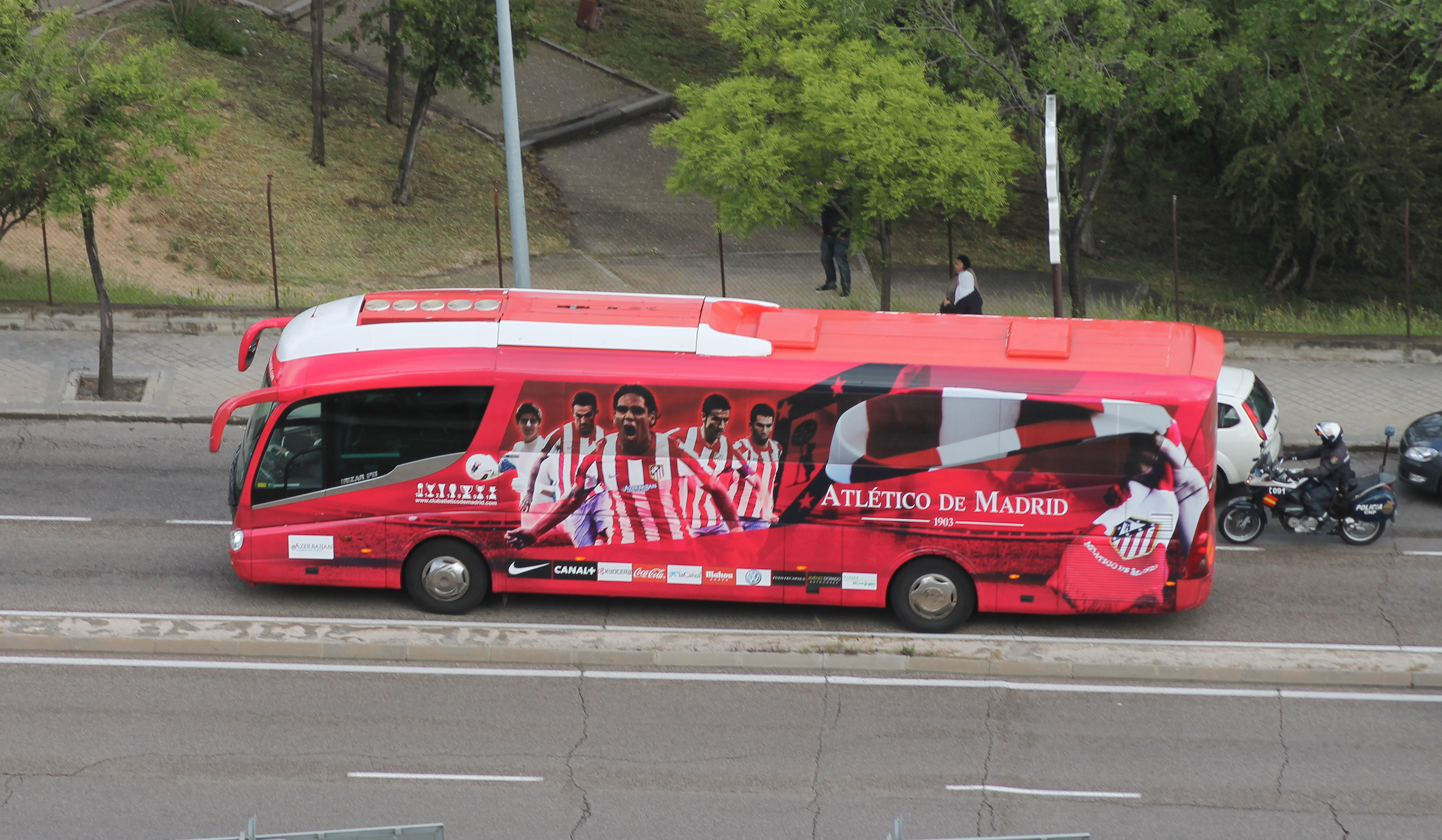
Atlético de Madrid's bus, decorated with red and white colours

Atlético began playing in blue and white, mirroring then-parent club Athletic Bilbao, but both changed to red-and-white stripes by 1911 which became their traditional colours. The change took hold because red and white striped tops were the cheap to make, as the same combination was used to make bed mattresses, and the unused cloth was easily converted into football shirts. The kit has been made by Nike since 2001, as the company wants to provide competition with rival brand Adidas, who have a long-term deal with Real Madrid.

The club's main shirt sponsorship by the government of Azerbaijan between 2012 and 2014, featuring the slogan 'Land of Fire', was condemned by Reporters Without Borders, who satirized it in a campaign visual in which the shirt's vertical stripes become prison bars with the logo "Azerbaijan, Land of Repression". Atlético Madrid admitted its sponsorship deal had a political dimension, saying the intention was to "promote the image of Azerbaijan". In August 2014, the Helsinki Foundation for Human Rights wrote to Atlético, calling on it to end the sponsorship by and promotion of Azerbaijan because of the country's human rights record, calling it "one of the most repressive countries in the world".

In its 2003–04 season, the club was sponsored by Columbia Pictures, who would change the shirt sponsor's logo, and occasionally the shirt itself, as they did with the away shirt when Spider-Man 2 was in cinemas. This kit sponsorship deal featured 16 film titles – an unprecedented number, which has not since been replicated as of 2022. Films included Columbia Picture's 2004 film White Chicks, which received mixed commentary. Because shirts would have to be introduced and removed from shops at a very fast pace to keep up with film releases, Nike decided to not include a sponsor's logo on replica shirts made from 2003 to 2005.

Period	Kit manufacturer	Shirt Sponsor (Front)	Shirt Sponsor (Back)	Shirt Sponsor (Sleeve)	Shorts Sponsor
1950-80	Deportes Cóndor	None	None	None	None
1980–86	Meyba	None	None	None	None
1986–89	Puma	None	None	None	None
1989–90	Puma	Mita	None	None	None
1990–93	Puma	Marbella*	None	None	None
1993–94	Puma	Antena 3	None	None	None
1994–96	Puma	Marbella*	None	None	None
1996–97	Puma	Bandai/Tamagotchi	None	None	None
1997–98	Puma	Marbella*	None	None	None
1998–99	Reebok	Marbella*	None	None	None
1999–2000	Reebok	None	None	None	None
2000–01	Reebok	Idea	None	None	None
2001–03	Nike	Idea	None	None	None
2003–04	Nike	Columbia Pictures**	None	None	Racer
2004–05	Nike	Columbia Pictures**	None	None	AXN
2005–06	Nike	KIA	Kyocera	None	AXN
2006–08	Nike	KIA	Kyocera	None	Asisa Salud
2008–11	Nike	KIA	Kyocera	None	Paf
03–05 2012	Nike	Rixos Hotels (Liga only, except v. R. Madrid)	Kyocera	None	None
05–12 2012	Nike	Huawei	Kyocera	None	None
2012–14	Nike	Azerbaijan Land of Fire	Kyocera	None	None
2014–15	Nike	Baku 2015	Plus500	Huawei	None
2015–16	Nike	Plus500	Azerbaijan Land of Fire	Huawei	None
2016–18	Nike	Plus500	None	None	None
2018–20	Nike	Plus500	Ria Money Transfer	Hyundai	None
2020–21	Nike	Plus500	Ria Money Transfer	Hyundai	VERSUS
2021–22	Nike	Plus500	Ria Money Transfer	Hyundai	None
2022–23	Nike	WhaleFin	Ria Money Transfer	Hyundai	None
2023–24	Nike	Riyadh Air	Ria Money Transfer	Hyundai	None
2024–25	Nike	Riyadh Air	Hyundai	Kraken	ComAve
2025–	Nike	Riyadh Air	Visit Rwanda	Kraken	ComAve

- (**) – Columbia Pictures did not include their logo on the club's match shirts or other kits in favour of the branding of their films Bad Boys II, Hollywood Homicide, S.W.A.T. (all 2003), The Rundown, Gothika, Big Fish, Peter Pan, The Punisher, Spider-Man 2, Hellboy, White Chicks, Resident Evil 2: Apocalypse, Say I Do, Anacondas: The Hunt for the Blood Orchid, Christmas with the Kranks (all 2004), Closer, Spanglish, Hitch, XXX: State of the Union, A King in Havana, Kung Fu Hustle, Deuce Bigalow: European Gigolo, Bewitched, Stealth, and The Legend of Zorro (all 2005).

== Supporters ==
Frente Atlético is an ultra group of Club Atlético de Madrid founded with that name in 1982. They had around 2,500 members in 2014, one of the largest ultra groups in Spanish football. That same year, Atlético Madrid expelled Frente Atlético and prohibited the display of its symbols in the stadium.

FA are friends with Ruch Chorzow, Roma, Fortuna Düsseldorf, Catanzaro and Sporting Gijón.

They also have a great rivalry with the ultras of Real Madrid, Sevilla, Espanyol, Valencia, Rayo Vallecano, Deportivo, Celta, Real Sociedad, Athletic, Osasuna, Alavés, Zaragoza, Malaga, Valladolid, Oviedo, Porto, Sporting Lisbon, Benfica, Lazio and Marseille. They also have bad relations and constant incidents with a former section of the group called Suburbios Firm.

Celebrities Joaquín Sabina, Belén Esteban, Birgitte V. Gade, Leiva, Álvaro Bautista, Omar Hittini, Ana Rosa Quintana, Javier Bardem, Sara Carbonero, Pablo Iglesias Turrión, El Langui, Pedro Sánchez, Luis de Guindos, Rosendo Mercado, José Tomás, Cayetano Martínez de Irujo, David Muñoz, Will Smith, Harrison Ford, Halle Berry, Tom Cruise, Matt Damon, Vin Diesel, Travis Kelce, Patrick Mahomes, Charlize Theron and Karl-Anthony Towns are all fans of the club. Atlético is also supported by King Felipe VI, who became Honorary President of the club in 2003.

Atlético Madrid became one of the most popular sports clubs in the world with a large international fanbase. As of 15 Apr 2026, Atlético ranked 19th place in the top 20 most popular sports clubs on Instagram in the world:

Rank	Sports club	Sport	Country	Followers
1	Real Madrid	Football	Spain	181 million
2	Barcelona	Football	Spain	147 million
3	Manchester United	Football	United Kingdom	66.5 million
4	Paris Saint-Germain	Football	France	65.9 million
5	Juventus	Football	Italy	60 million
6	Manchester City	Football	United Kingdom	56.6 million
7	Liverpool	Football	United Kingdom	49.2 million
8	Chelsea	Football	United Kingdom	44.9 million
9	Bayern Munich	Football	Germany	44.5 million
10	Golden State Warriors	Basketball	United States	32.3 million
11	Arsenal	Football	United Kingdom	31.9 million
12	Al Nassr	Football	Saudi Arabia	29.1 million
13	Flamengo	Football	Brazil	25.2 million
14	Los Angeles Lakers	Basketball	United States	25.2 million
15	Borussia Dortmund	Football	Germany	20.8 million
16	AC Milan	Football	Italy	18.3 million
17	Galatasaray	Football	Turkey	18.2 million
18	Inter Miami	Football	United States	18.2 million
19	Atlético Madrid	Football	Spain	18 million
20	Tottenham Hotspur	Football	United Kingdom	17.3 million

== Notable players ==
Koke has worn the Atlético shirt in more than 740 matches since 2009, while Antoine Griezmann has the club's record for most goals with 212. João Félix is the club's most expensive signing at €126 million, and at €120 million Antoine Griezmann is the club's biggest sale.

As of 19 August 2026

Most appearances
Rank	Player	Apps	League apps	Period	Nationality
1	Koke	741	520	2009–present	Spain
2	Adelardo Rodríguez	553	401	1959–1976	Spain
3	Jan Oblak	539	400	2014–present	Slovenia
4	Antoine Griezmann	501	349	2014–2019; 2021–2026	France
5	Tomás Reñones	483	367	1984–1996	Spain
6	Enrique Collar	470	371	1952–1969	Spain
7	Ángel Correa	469	335	2015–2025	Argentina
8	Carlos Aguilera	456	365	1988–1993; 1996–2005	Spain
9	Saúl	427	295	2012–2025	Spain
10	Isacio Calleja	425	300	1958–1972	Spain

Most goals
Rank	Player	Goals	League goals	Period	Nationality
1	Antoine Griezmann	212	143	2014–2019; 2021–2026	France
2	Luis Aragonés	173	123	1964–1974	Spain
3	Adrián Escudero	169	150	1945–1958	Spain
4	Paco Campos	158	144	1940–1948	Spain
5	José Eulogio Gárate	136	109	1966–1977	Spain
6	Fernando Torres	129	109	2001–2007; 2015–2018	Spain
7	Joaquín Peiró	125	95	1954–1962	Spain
8	Adelardo Rodríguez	113	73	1959–1976	Spain
9	Enrique Collar	105	71	1952–1969	Spain
10	José Juncosa	103	80	1944–1955	Spain

== See also ==
- Atlético Madrileño
- Atlético Madrid (youth)
- Atlético Madrid Femenino
- Atlético Ottawa
- Atlético San Luis
- Atlético San Luis Premier
- Atlético San Luis (women)
- Jamshedpur FC
- Tata Football Academy
- List of world champion football clubs
