= 1976–77 Atlético Madrid season =

Atlético Madrid
1976–77 season
- President: Vicente Calderon
- Head Coach: Luis Aragones
- Stadium: Vicente Calderon
- Primera Division: Winners (In 1977–78 European Cup)
- Copa del Rey: Eightfinals
- European Cup Winners' Cup: Semifinals
- Top goalscorer: League: Ruben Cano (19); All: Ruben Cano (23)
Home colours	Away colours

The 1976–77 season was Atlético Madrid's 73rd season in existence and the club's 40th consecutive season in the top flight of Spanish football.

== Summary ==
During summer the club transferred in Argentine Forward Ruben Cano from Elche CF forming an effective partnership with Ruben Ayala. The season is best remembered by a 4-0 won match against archrivals Real Madrid. In his third campaign as head coach Luis Aragones clinched the league trophy with the team defeating FC Barcelona in a closed race. The eightieth league title was assured on 15 May 1977 at Santiago Bernabeu stadium with a draw. Meanwhile, in the European Cup Winners' Cup the team reached the semifinals stage only to be defeated by the West German side Hamburger SV in a two-legged series. Also, in Copa del Rey the club as incumbent champions was early eliminated in eightfinals by underdogs Sevilla FC.

== Squad ==
Note: Flags indicate national team as defined under FIFA eligibility rules; some limited exceptions apply. Players may hold more than one non-FIFA nationality.

No.	Pos.	Nation	Player
—	GK	ESP	Miguel Reina
—	GK	ESP	José Pacheco Gómez
—	DF	ESP	José Luis Capón
—	DF	BRA	Luís Pereira
—	DF	ESP	Eusebio Bejarano
—	DF	ESP	Marcelino
—	DF	ARG	Ramón Heredia
—	DF	ARG	Panadero Diaz
—	DF	ESP	Juan Sierra
—	MF	ESP	Francisco Bermejo
—	MF	PAR	Domingo Benegas

No.	Pos.	Nation	Player
—	MF	ESP	Ignacio Salcedo
—	MF	ESP	Alberto Fernández
—	MF	ESP	Eugenio Leal
—	MF	ESP	Robi
—	FW	ARG	Rubén Ayala
—	FW	ARG	José Eulogio Gárate
—	FW	BRA	Heraldo Bezerra
—	FW	BRA	Leivinha
—	FW	ESP	Francisco Aguilar Fernández
—	FW	ARG	Rubén Cano

=== Transfers ===
In
Pos.	Name	from	Type
FW	Rubén Cano	Elche CF	
GK	Robi	Salamanca	
DF	Juan José Rubio	Atletico Madrileño	
DF	Juan Sierra	Atletico Madrileño	
DF	Antonio Toran	Atletico Madrileño	

Out
Pos.	Name	To	Type
MF	Adelardo		retired
DF	Francisco Baena	Deportivo Alavés	
DF	Francisco Galán	Real Oviedo	
DF	Luis Gómez	CD Málaga	
DF	Antonio Díaz	Granada CF	

== Competitions ==
=== Primera Division ===
==== League table ====
Pos	Team	Pld	W	D	L	GF	GA	GD	Pts	Qualification or relegation
1	Atlético Madrid (C)	34	19	8	7	62	33	+29	46	Qualification for the European Cup first round
2	Barcelona	34	18	9	7	69	34	+35	45	Qualification for the UEFA Cup first round
3	Athletic Bilbao	34	15	8	11	55	45	+10	38	Qualification for the UEFA Cup first round
4	Las Palmas	34	15	6	13	56	51	+5	36	Qualification for the UEFA Cup first round
5	Real Betis	34	15	6	13	42	42	0	36	Qualification for the Cup Winners' Cup first round (Note: Real Betis qualified to the Cup Winners' Cup as winners of the Copa del Rey.)

Source: BDFútbol
Rules for classification: 1) Points; 2) Head-to-head results; 3) Goal difference; 4) Number of goals scored
(C) Champions

==== Results by round ====
Round	1	2	3	4	5	6	7	8	9	10	11	12	13	14	15	16	17	18	19	20	21	22	23	24	25	26	27	28	29	30	31	32	33	34
Ground	H	A	H	A	H	A	H	A	H	A	H	A	A	H	A	H	A	A	H	A	H	A	H	A	H	A	H	A	H	H	A	H	A	H
Result	W	L	W	L	W	W	W	W	W	L	D	D	L	D	W	W	W	D	W	D	W	W	D	D	W	L	W	W	W	L	W	W	D	L
Position	2	6	5	9	4	3	2	1	1	1	2	2	4	3	3	3	2	2	2	2	2	1	1	1	1	1	1	1	1	1	1	1	1	1

Source: Competitive matches
A = Away; H = Home; W = Win; D = Draw; L = Loss; = Leader qualified to the 1977–78 European Cup; = Classified to the 1977–78 UEFA Cup; = Relegated to the 1977–78 Segunda División

–

==== Matches ====
5 September 1976 1	Atlético Madrid	2–0	CD Málaga	Madrid
	Leivinha 1'; Cano 14'	Report		Stadium: Vicente Calderon; Attendance: 45,000; Referee: Crespo Aurre

12 September 1976 2	Celta	1–0	Atlético Madrid	Vigo
	Mori 69'	Report		Stadium: Balaídos; Referee: Borrás del Barrio

19 September 1976 3	Atlético Madrid	2–1	UD Salamanca	Madrid
	Leivinha 48'; Cano 84'	Report	79' Álvarez	Stadium: Vicente Calderon; Attendance: 60,000; Referee: Oliva Fortuny

25 September 1976 4	Real Sociedad	2–0	Atlético Madrid	San Sebastián
	Satrústegui 50'; Ufarte 57'	Report		Stadium: Atotxa; Referee: Fernández Quirós

3 October 1976 5	Atlético Madrid	2–1	Athletic Bilbao	Madrid
	Leivinha 43'; Alberto 59'	Report	32' Villar	Stadium: Vicente Calderon; Attendance: 75,000; Referee: Forés Bachero

17 October 1976 6	Espanol	1–4	Atlético Madrid	Barcelona
	Marañón 82' (pen.)	Report	30', 44' Leivinha; 46' Cano; 89' Ayala	Stadium: Sarria; Referee: Guruceta Muro

24 October 1976 7	Atlético Madrid	3–1	FC Barcelona	Madrid
	Cano 14'; Heredia 37'; Leal 44'	Report	52' Cruijff	Stadium: Vicente Calderon; Referee: Olavarria González

31 October 1976 8	Elche CF	0–1	Atlético Madrid	Elche
		Report	83' Aguilar	Stadium: Nuevo Altabix; Referee: Orrantia Capelastegui

7 November 1976 9	Atlético Madrid	1–0	Hercules CF	Madrid
	Ayala 35'	Report		Stadium: Vicente Calderon; Attendance: 50,000; Referee: López Cuadrado

14 November 1976 10	Real Betis	1–0	Atlético Madrid	Seville
	Ladinszky 60'	Report		Stadium: Benito Villamarín; Referee: Santana Páez

21 November 1976 11	Atlético Madrid	3–3	Sevilla FC	Madrid
	Luís Pereira 53', 72'; Cano 66'	Report	33', 58' Scotta; 51' Sanjosé	Stadium: Vicente Calderon; Attendance: 10,000; Referee: Orellana Álvarez

27 November 1976 12	UD Las Palmas	1–1	Atlético Madrid	Las Palmas
	Fernández 43'	Report	66' Cano	Stadium: Insular; Referee: Carreira Abad

5 December 1976 13	Atlético Madrid	0–3	Burgos CF	Madrid
		Report	48' Viteri; 43' Krešić; 83' Valdés	Stadium: Vicente Calderon; Attendance: 40,000; Referee: García Carrión

12 December 1976 14	Racing Santander	0–0	Atlético Madrid	Santander
		Report		Stadium: El Sardinero; Referee: Borrás del Barrio

19 December 1976 15	Atlético Madrid	2–0	Real Zaragoza	Madrid
	Ayala 32', 85' (pen.)	Report		Stadium: Vicente Calderon; Attendance: 5,000; Referee: Orrantia Capelastegui

2 January 1977 16	Atlético Madrid	4–0	Real Madrid	Madrid
	Cano 2', 66'; Panadero 63'; Bermejo 81'	Report		Stadium: Vicente Calderon; Attendance: 45,000; Referee: Orellana Álvarez

9 January 1977 17	Valencia CF	2–3	Atlético Madrid	Valencia
	Kempes 47', 77'	Report	17' Leal; 53', 64' Cano	Stadium: Luis Casanova; Referee: Crespo Aurre

16 January 1977 18	CD Málaga	0–0	Atlético Madrid	Málaga
		Report		Stadium: La Rosaleda; Referee: Borrás del Barrio

23 January 1977 19	Atlético Madrid	3–0	Celta	Madrid
	Robi 31'; Ayala 48' (rig); Heredia 78' (pen.)	Report		Stadium: Vicente Calderon; Attendance: 40,000; Referee: Oliva Fortuny

30 January 1977 20	UD Salamanca	1–1	Atlético Madrid	Villares de la Reina
	Juanjo 8'	Report	89' Cano	Stadium: Helmántico; Referee: Tomeo Palanques

6 February 1977 21	Atlético Madrid	5–1	Real Sociedad	Madrid
	Cano 1', 30'; Ayala 70', 78'; Bermejo 71'	Report	85' Kortabarría	Stadium: Vicente Calderon; Attendance: 75,000; Referee: Carreira Abad

16 February 1977 22	Athletic Bilbao	0–1	Atlético Madrid	Bilbao
		Report	42' Cano	Stadium: San Mamés; Referee: Guruceta Muro

20 February 1977 23	Atlético Madrid	1–1	Espanol	Madrid
	Bermejo 17'	Report	65' Marañón	Stadium: Vicente Calderon; Referee: Balsa Ron

27 February 1977 24	FC Barcelona	1–1	Atlético Madrid	Barcelona
	Clarés 75'	Report	84' (o.g.) Neeskens	Stadium: Camp Nou; Attendance: 90,000; Referee: Sáiz Elizondo

6 March 1977 25	Atlético Madrid	5–1	Elche CF	Madrid
	Luís Pereira 16'; Dominichi 52' (aut); Leal 54'; Aguilar 67'; Salcedo 84'	Report	65' (rig) Voglino	Stadium: Vicente Calderon; Attendance: 70,000; Referee: Olavarria González

13 March 1977 26	Hercules CF	2–1	Atlético Madrid	Alicante
	Lübeke 56'; Rivera 85'	Report	79' Cano	Stadium: José Rico Pérez; Referee: Orrantia Capelastegui

20 March 1977 27	Atlético Madrid	3–1	Real Betis	Madrid
	Robi 9'; Ayala 31' (pen.); Benítez 52' (aut)	Report	86' (rig) Mühren	Stadium: Vicente Calderon; Attendance: 40,000; Referee: Carreira Abad

3 April 1977 28	Sevilla FC	1–2	Atlético Madrid	Seville
	Scotta 37'	Report	5' Ayala; 77' Cano	Stadium: Ramón Sanchez-Pizjuan; Referee: Acebal Pezón

10 April 1977 29	Atlético Madrid	1–0	UD Las Palmas	Madrid
	Cano 86'	Report		Stadium: Vicente Calderon; Attendance: 40,000; Referee: De Burgos Núñez

24 April 1977 30	Burgos CF	2–0	Atlético Madrid	Burgos
	Marcelino 52' (aut); Juanito 90'	Report		Stadium: El Plantío; Referee: Acebal Pezón

1 May 1977 31	Atlético Madrid	5–1	Racing Santander	Madrid
	Luís Pereira 2'; Leivinha 4', 86'; Ayala 52' (rig), 87'	Report	69' (rig) Zuviría	Stadium: Vicente Calderon; Referee: Ausocúa Sanz

8 May 1977 32	Real Zaragoza	0–2	Atlético Madrid	Zaragoza
		Report	19' Cano; 63' Ayala	Stadium: La Romareda; Referee: Olavarria González

15 May 1977 33	Real Madrid	1–1	Atlético Madrid	Madrid
	Martínez 70'	Report	40' Cano	Stadium: Santiago Bernabéu; Referee: Carreira Abad

22 May 1977 34	Atlético Madrid	2–3	Valencia CF	Madrid
	Leivinha 60'; Ayala 87' (pen.)	Report	47', 70' Kempes; 61' Eloy	Stadium: Vicente Calderon; Referee: Ausocúa Sanz

=== Copa del Rey ===
==== Eightfinals ====
27 April 1977 1	Sevilla FC	2–0	Atlético Madrid	Seville
	Cantudo 25'; Montero 36'	Report		Stadium: Ramón Sánchez-Pizjuán; Referee: Balsa Ron

12 May 1977 2	Atlético Madrid	1–0 (1–2 agg.)	Sevilla FC	Madrid
	Ayala 57'	Report		Stadium: Vicente Calderon; Attendance: 35,000; Referee: Sáiz Elizondo

=== European Cup Winners' Cup ===
==== Round of 32 ====
15 September 1976 1	Rapid Wien (Austria)	1–2	(Spain) Atlético Madrid	Wien
	Krankl 19'	Report	80' Cano; 88' Ayala	Stadium: Praterstadion; Attendance: 45,000; Referee: (Belgium) Delcourt

29 September 1976 2	Atlético Madrid (Spain)	1–1	(Austria) Rapid Wien	Madrid
	Leivinha 72'	Report	79' Krejcirik	Stadium: Vicente Calderon; Attendance: 25,000; Referee: (England) Partridge

==== Eightfinals ====
20 October 1976 1	Atlético Madrid (Spain)	1–0	(Socialist Federal Republic of Yugoslavia) Hajduk Split	Madrid
	Cano 49'	Report		Stadium: Vicente Calderon; Attendance: 20,000; Referee: (West Germany) Frickel

4 November 1976 2	Hajduk Split (Socialist Federal Republic of Yugoslavia)	1–2	(Spain) Atlético Madrid	Split
	Žungul 26'	Report	53' Ayala; 59' Leal	Stadium: Stari Plac; Attendance: 25,000; Referee: (Scotland) Paterson

==== Quarterfinals ====
2 March 1977 1	Levski Sofia (Bulgaria)	2–1	(Spain) Atlético Madrid	Sofia
	Tsvetkov 9'; Milanov 38'	Report	68' Bermejo	Stadium: Vasil Levski; Attendance: 80,000; Referee: (Italy) Gonella

16 March 1977 2	Atlético Madrid (Spain)	2–0	(Bulgaria) Levski Sofia	Madrid
	Ayala 4' (pen.), 69' (pen.)	Report		Stadium: Vicente Calderon; Attendance: 55,000; Referee: (Republic of Ireland) Carpenter

==== Semifinals ====
6 April 1977 1	Atlético Madrid (Spain)	3–1	(West Germany) Hamburger SV	Madrid
	Cano 53', 67'; Leal 59'	Report	56' Magath	Stadium: Vicente Calderon; Attendance: 30,000; Referee: (Romania) Rainea

20 April 1977 2	Hamburger SV (West Germany)	3–0	(Spain) Atlético Madrid	Hamburg
	Capón 19'; Reimann 21'; Keller 27'	Report		Stadium: Volksparkstadion; Attendance: 61,000; Referee: (Sweden) Eriksson

== Statistics ==
=== Players statistics ===
No.	Pos	Nat	Player	Total		Primera Division		European Cup Winners' Cup		Copa del Rey	
No.	Pos	Nat	Player	Apps	Goals	Apps	Goals	Apps	Goals	Apps	Goals
	GK	(Spain) ESP	Miguel Reina	39	-38	29+1	-29	7	-7	2	-2
	DF	(Spain) ESP	Marcelino	36	0	25+3	0	5+1	0	2	0
	DF	(Brazil) BRA	Luís Pereira	40	4	32	4	8	0		
	DF	(Spain) ESP	Eusebio Bejarano	34	0	24+4	0	4+1	0	1	0
	DF	(Spain) ESP	José Luis Capón	39	0	28+1	0	8	0	2	0
	MF	(Spain) ESP	Robi	35	2	26+2	2	4+1	0	1+1	0
	MF	(Spain) ESP	Alberto Fernández	40	1	27+4	1	5+2	0	1+1	0
	MF	(Spain) ESP	Eugenio Leal	43	5	33	3	8	2	2	0
	FW	(Brazil) BRA	Leivinha	18	9	14+1	8	3	1		
	FW	(Argentina) ARG	Rubén Ayala	43	18	34	13	8	4	1	1
	FW	(Argentina) ARG	Rubén Cano	43	23	33	19	8	4	2	0
	GK	(Spain) ESP	José Pacheco Gómez	6	-6	5	-4	1	-2		
	MF	(Paraguay) PAR	Domingo Benegas	24	0	13+4	0	5	0	2	0
	DF	(Argentina) ARG	Panadero Diaz	17	1	13	1	3+1	0		
	DF	(Argentina) ARG	Ramón Heredia	20	2	11+3	2	4+1	0	1	0
	MF	(Spain) ESP	Francisco Bermejo	26	4	10+10	3	4	1	1+1	0
	FW	(Spain) ESP	Francisco Aguilar	26	2	9+9	2	1+5	0	2	0
	MF	(Spain) ESP	Ignacio Salcedo	16	1	6+6	1	2	0	2	0
	DF	(Spain) ESP	Juan Sierra	1	0	1	0				
	FW	(Brazil) BRA	Heraldo Bezerra	1	0	1	0				
	FW	(Argentina) ARG	José Eulogio Gárate	1	0	0+1	0				
	DF	(Spain) ESP	Juan José Rubio	1	0	0	0	0	0	0+1	0

- Source: http://www.bdfutbol.com/en/t/t1976-777.html
