= 1976 Copa del Generalísimo final =

- Event: 1975–76 Copa del Generalísimo
Atlético Madrid	Zaragoza
1	0
- Date: 26 June 1976
- Venue: Santiago Bernabéu, Madrid
- Referee: José Segrelles
- Attendance: 80,000

The 1976 Copa del Generalísimo final was the 74th final of the Spanish Cup. The match was played at Santiago Bernabéu Stadium in Madrid, on 26 June 1976, being won by Atlético Madrid, who beat Real Zaragoza 1–0.

It was the last final to be called the Copa del Generalísimo, following the death of Francisco Franco in November 1975. Since then, it has been called the Copa del Rey. The match was watched by King Juan Carlos I and the eight-year-old Prince of Asturias (later Felipe VI). Felipe became an Atlético fan after watching them win.

== Match details ==
26 June 1976
21:00 CET

Atlético Madrid	1–0	Real Zaragoza
Gárate 26'	Report

Santiago Bernabéu Stadium, Madrid
Attendance: 80,000
Referee: José Segrelles

Atlético Madrid
Zaragoza

GK	1	(Spain) Miguel Reina
DF	2	(Spain) José Luis Capón
DF	3	(Argentina) Ramón Heredia
DF	4	(Spain) Eusebio	(yellow card) 70'
DF	5	(Argentina) Panadero Díaz
MF	6	(Spain) Marcelino
MF	7	(Spain) Ignacio Salcedo		(substituted off) 76'
MF	8	(Spain) Eugenio Leal
FW	9	(Argentina) Rubén Ayala
FW	10	(Spain) José Eulogio Gárate (c)
FW	11	(Spain) Heraldo Bezerra		(substituted off) 60'
Substitutes:
MF	12	(Spain) Alberto		(substituted on) 76'
FW	14	(Spain) Francisco Aguilar		(substituted on) 60'
Manager:
(Spain) Luis Aragonés

GK	1	(Spain) Andrés Junquera
DF	2	(Spain) José Heredia	(yellow card) 30'	(substituted off) 46'
DF	3	(Uruguay) Juan Carlos Blanco
DF	4	(Spain) Manolo González (c)
DF	5	(Spain) Ángel Royo
MF	6	(Spain) José Pablo García Castany		(substituted off) 79'
MF	7	(Spain) Pepe González
MF	8	(Paraguay) Saturnino Arrúa
MF	9	(Spain) Simarro
FW	10	(Spain) Laureano Rubial
FW	11	(Paraguay) Carlos Diarte	(yellow card) 32'
Substitutes:
DF	12	(Spain) José Luis Rico		(substituted on) 46'
FW	14	(Spain) Juanjo		(substituted on) 79'
Manager:
(Spain) Carriega

MATCH RULES

- 90 minutes.
- 30 minutes of extra-time if necessary.
- Penalty shoot-out if scores still level.
- Four named substitutes.
- Maximum of two substitutions.
