= 1978 FIFA World Cup Group 3 =

Football tournament group stage

Group 3 of the 1978 FIFA World Cup was one of four groups of nations competing at the 1978 FIFA World Cup, consisting of Brazil, Austria, Spain and Sweden.

In their first World Cup appearance since 1958, Austria retrieved some of their past glory, finishing ahead of a Zico and Rivellino-led Brazil. The Seleção clinched second place and faced South American rivals Argentina and Peru in the second round.

== Standings ==
Pos	Team	Pld	W	D	L	GF	GA	GD	Pts	Qualification
1	Austria	3	2	0	1	3	2	+1	4	Advance to second round
2	Brazil	3	1	2	0	2	1	+1	4	Advance to second round
3	Spain	3	1	1	1	2	2	0	3	
4	Sweden	3	0	1	2	1	3	−2	1	

Source: FIFA

== Matches ==
=== Austria vs Spain ===
3 June 1978
13:45 ART

Austria	2–1	Spain
Schachner 10'; Krankl 76'		Dani 21'

Estadio José Amalfitani, Buenos Aires
Attendance: 40,841
Referee: Károly Palotai (Hungary)

Austria	Spain

GK	1	Friedrich Koncilia
DF	2	Robert Sara (c)
DF	3	Erich Obermayer
DF	4	Gerhard Breitenberger
DF	5	Bruno Pezzey
MF	7	Josef Hickersberger	(substituted off) 67'
MF	8	Herbert Prohaska
MF	10	Willi Kreuz
MF	11	Kurt Jara
FW	9	Hans Krankl
FW	18	Walter Schachner	(substituted off) 80'
Substitutions:
DF	15	Heribert Weber	(substituted on) 67'
FW	19	Hans Pirkner	(substituted on) 80'
Manager:
Helmut Senekowitsch

GK	13	Miguel Ángel
CB	17	Marcelino
CB	5	Migueli
CB	2	Toño
DM	18	Pirri (c)
RM	21	Isidoro San José
LM	11	Julio Cardeñosa	(substituted off) 46'
AM	4	Juan Asensi
RF	7	Dani
CF	20	Rubén Cano
LF	19	Carles Rexach	(substituted off) 60'
Substitutions:
MF	14	Eugenio Leal	(substituted on) 46'
FW	9	Quini	(substituted on) 60'
Manager:
László Kubala

=== Brazil vs Sweden ===
This match is remembered for Zico's disallowed goal during injury time of the second half. Welsh referee Clive Thomas whistled for full time while the ball was in the air after a corner kick, fractions of seconds before Zico's header.

3 June 1978
13:45 ART

Brazil	1–1	Sweden
Reinaldo 45'		Sjöberg 37'

Estadio José Maria Minella, Mar del Plata
Attendance: 32,569
Referee: Clive Thomas (Wales)

Brazil	Sweden

GK	1	Émerson Leão
RB	2	Toninho
CB	3	Oscar	(yellow card) 87'
CB	4	Amaral
LB	6	Edinho
DM	17	Batista
CM	5	Toninho Cerezo		(substituted off) 86'
CM	10	Rivellino (c)
AM	8	Zico
RW	18	Gil		(substituted off) 66'
CF	9	Reinaldo
Substitutions:
RB	13	Nelinho		(substituted on) 66'
CM	11	Dirceu		(substituted on) 86'
Manager:
Cláudio Coutinho

GK	1	Ronnie Hellström
DF	2	Hasse Borg
DF	3	Roy Andersson
DF	4	Björn Nordqvist (c)
DF	5	Ingemar Erlandsson
MF	6	Staffan Tapper
MF	7	Anders Linderoth
MF	8	Bo Larsson
MF	9	Lennart Larsson	(substituted off) 81'
FW	10	Thomas Sjöberg
FW	11	Benny Wendt
Substitutions:
FW	22	Ralf Edström	(substituted on) 81'
Manager:
Georg Ericson

=== Austria vs Sweden ===
7 June 1978
13:45 ART

Austria	1–0	Sweden
Krankl 42' (pen.)

Estadio José Amalfitani, Buenos Aires
Attendance: 41,424
Referee: Charles Corver (Netherlands)

Austria	Sweden

GK	1	Friedrich Koncilia
DF	2	Robert Sara (c)
DF	3	Erich Obermayer
DF	4	Gerhard Breitenberger
DF	5	Bruno Pezzey
MF	7	Josef Hickersberger
MF	8	Herbert Prohaska
MF	10	Willi Kreuz
MF	11	Kurt Jara
FW	9	Hans Krankl
FW	12	Eddy Krieger	(substituted off) 71'
Substitutions:
DF	15	Heribert Weber	(substituted on) 71'
Manager:
Helmut Senekowitsch

GK	1	Ronnie Hellström
DF	2	Hasse Borg
DF	3	Roy Andersson
DF	4	Björn Nordqvist (c)
DF	5	Ingemar Erlandsson
MF	6	Staffan Tapper	(substituted off) 36'
MF	7	Anders Linderoth	(substituted off) 60'
MF	8	Bo Larsson
MF	9	Lennart Larsson
FW	10	Thomas Sjöberg
FW	11	Benny Wendt
Substitutions:
FW	16	Conny Torstensson	(substituted on) 36'
FW	22	Ralf Edström	(substituted on) 60'
Manager:
Georg Ericson

=== Brazil vs Spain ===
7 June 1978
13:45 ART

Brazil	0–0	Spain

Estadio José Maria Minella, Mar del Plata
Attendance: 34,771
Referee: Sergio Gonella (Italy)

Brazil	Spain

GK	1	Émerson Leão (c)
RB	13	Nelinho	(substituted off) 70'
CB	3	Oscar
CB	4	Amaral
LB	6	Edinho
DM	17	Batista
CM	5	Toninho Cerezo
CM	11	Dirceu
AM	8	Zico	(substituted off) 84'
RW	2	Toninho
CF	9	Reinaldo
Substitutions:
RW	18	Gil	(substituted on) 70'
AM	19	Jorge Mendonça	(substituted on) 84'
Manager:
Cláudio Coutinho

GK	13	Miguel Ángel
RWB	3	Francisco Uría		(substituted off) 79'
CB	5	Migueli		(substituted off) 51'
CB	16	Antonio Olmo
LB	17	Marcelino
DM	21	Isidoro San José
CM	14	Eugenio Leal	(yellow card) 60'
CM	11	Julio Cardeñosa
CM	4	Juan Asensi (c)
CF	10	Santillana
FW	8	Juanito
Substitutions:
DF	6	Antonio Biosca		(substituted on) 51'
MF	12	Antonio Guzmán		(substituted on) 79'
Manager:
László Kubala

=== Spain vs Sweden ===
11 June 1978
13:45 ART

Spain	1–0	Sweden
Asensi 75'

Estadio José Amalfitani, Buenos Aires
Attendance: 42,132
Referee: Ferdinand Biwersi (West Germany)

Spain	Sweden

GK	13	Miguel Ángel
RB	17	Marcelino
CB	6	Antonio Biosca
CB	16	Antonio Olmo	(substituted off) 46'
LB	3	Francisco Uría
CM	21	Isidoro San José
CM	14	Eugenio Leal
CM	11	Julio Cardeñosa
AM	4	Juan Asensi (c)
CF	8	Juanito
CF	10	Santillana
Substitutions:
MF	18	Pirri	(substituted on) 46'
Manager:
László Kubala

GK	1	Ronnie Hellström
DF	2	Hasse Borg	(yellow card) 39'
DF	3	Roy Andersson
DF	4	Björn Nordqvist (c)
DF	5	Ingemar Erlandsson
MF	8	Bo Larsson
MF	9	Lennart Larsson
MF	18	Olle Nordin
FW	10	Thomas Sjöberg		(substituted off) 67'
FW	15	Torbjörn Nilsson
FW	22	Ralf Edström		(substituted off) 60'
Substitutions:
FW	11	Benny Wendt		(substituted on) 60'
FW	7	Anders Linderoth		(substituted on) 67'
Manager:
Georg Ericson

=== Brazil vs Austria ===
11 June 1978
13:45 ART

Brazil	1–0	Austria
Dinamite 40'

Estadio José Maria Minella, Mar del Plata
Attendance: 35,221
Referee: Robert Wurtz (France)

Brazil	Austria

GK	1	Émerson Leão (c)
RB	2	Toninho
CB	3	Oscar
CB	4	Amaral
LB	16	Rodrigues Neto
DM	17	Batista
CM	5	Toninho Cerezo	(substituted off) 71'
CM	11	Dirceu
AM	19	Jorge Mendonça	(substituted off) 84'
RW	18	Gil
CF	20	Roberto Dinamite
Substitutions:
CM	21	Chicão	(substituted on) 71'
AM	8	Zico	(substituted on) 84'
Manager:
Cláudio Coutinho

GK	1	Friedrich Koncilia
DF	2	Robert Sara (c)
DF	3	Erich Obermayer
DF	4	Gerhard Breitenberger
DF	5	Bruno Pezzey
MF	7	Josef Hickersberger	(substituted off) 61'
MF	8	Herbert Prohaska
MF	10	Willi Kreuz
MF	11	Kurt Jara
FW	9	Hans Krankl
FW	12	Eddy Krieger	(substituted off) 84'
Substitutions:
DF	15	Heribert Weber	(substituted on) 61'
MF	13	Günther Happich	(substituted on) 84'
Manager:
Helmut Senekowitsch

== See also ==
- Austria at the FIFA World Cup
- Brazil at the FIFA World Cup
- Spain at the FIFA World Cup
- Sweden at the FIFA World Cup
