= 1971 Argentine Primera División =

80th season of top-tier football league in Argentina

Primera División
- Season: 1971
- Champions: Independiente (Metropolitano); Rosario Central (Nacional)
- 1972 Copa Libertadores: Rosario Central; Independiente

The 1971 Primera División season was the 80th season of top-flight football in Argentina. The Campeonato Metropolitano championship was modified, returning to a double round-robin format, and four relegations. Nevertheless, the AFA interventor, Raúl D'Onofrio (the 4th interventor since the military dictatorship led by Juan Carlos Onganía removed Valentín Suárez from the Association), reduced the number of relegated teams to two.

The entire season ran from 5 March to 29 December. As champion of 1970 Primera B, Ferro Carril Oeste promoted to Primera División. Independiente (10th title) won the Metropolitano and Rosario Central (coached by Ángel Labruna, not only won the 1st league title for the club but the first for a team outside Buenos Aires) won the Nacional championship. Moreover, both clubs qualified for the 1972 Copa Libertadores (in the case of Independiente, after winning the first "Liguilla pre-Libertadores" edition v San Lorenzo).

Los Andes and Platense were relegated.

== Metropolitano Championship ==
=== Final standings ===
Metropolitano
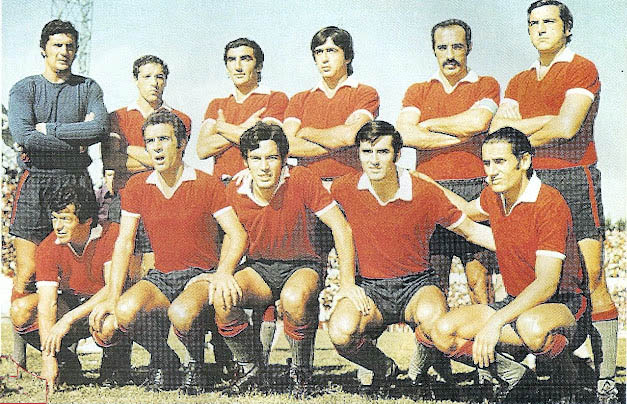
- Independiente, Metropolitano champions
- Season: 1971
- Dates: 5 March – 3 October
- Champions: Independiente (10th title)
- Promoted: Ferro C. Oeste
- Relegated: Los Andes; Platense
- Top goalscorer: (Argentina) Carlos Bianchi (36)
- Biggest home win: Newell's 6–0 Colón (16 Jun)
- Biggest away win: Platense 1–11 Independiente (11 Mar)

Pos	Team	Pld	W	D	L	GF	GA	GD	Pts
1	Independiente	36	20	10	6	57	26	+31	50
2	Vélez Sársfield	36	20	9	7	77	42	+35	49
3	Chacarita Juniors	36	17	12	7	49	35	+14	46
4	Newell's Old Boys	36	18	8	10	74	47	+27	44
4	San Lorenzo	36	18	8	10	75	52	+23	44
6	River Plate	36	14	11	11	60	52	+8	39
7	Ferro Carril Oeste	36	15	8	13	49	49	0	38
8	Boca Juniors	36	16	4	16	59	52	+7	36
9	Huracán	36	12	11	13	46	54	−8	35
10	Rosario Central	36	11	12	13	48	51	−3	34
10	Racing	36	10	14	12	56	64	−8	34
10	Gimnasia y Esgrima (LP)	36	10	14	12	51	62	−11	34
13	Estudiantes (LP)	36	11	10	15	41	55	−14	32
14	Colón	36	10	11	15	58	73	−15	31
15	Atlanta	36	11	8	17	45	57	−12	30
16	Argentinos Juniors	36	9	11	16	43	56	−13	29
16	Banfield	36	6	17	13	36	54	−18	29
18	Los Andes	36	9	9	18	38	57	−19	27
19	Platense	36	6	11	19	42	66	−24	23

=== Top scorers ===
Rank.	Player	Team	Goals
1	(Argentina) Carlos Bianchi	Vélez Sarsfield	36
2	(Argentina) Alfredo Obberti	Newell's Old Boys	28
3	(Argentina) Rodolfo Fischer	San Lorenzo	20
4	(Argentina) Roberto Cabral	Platense	18
5	(Argentina) Oscar Más	River Plate	16

== Nacional Championship ==
Nacional
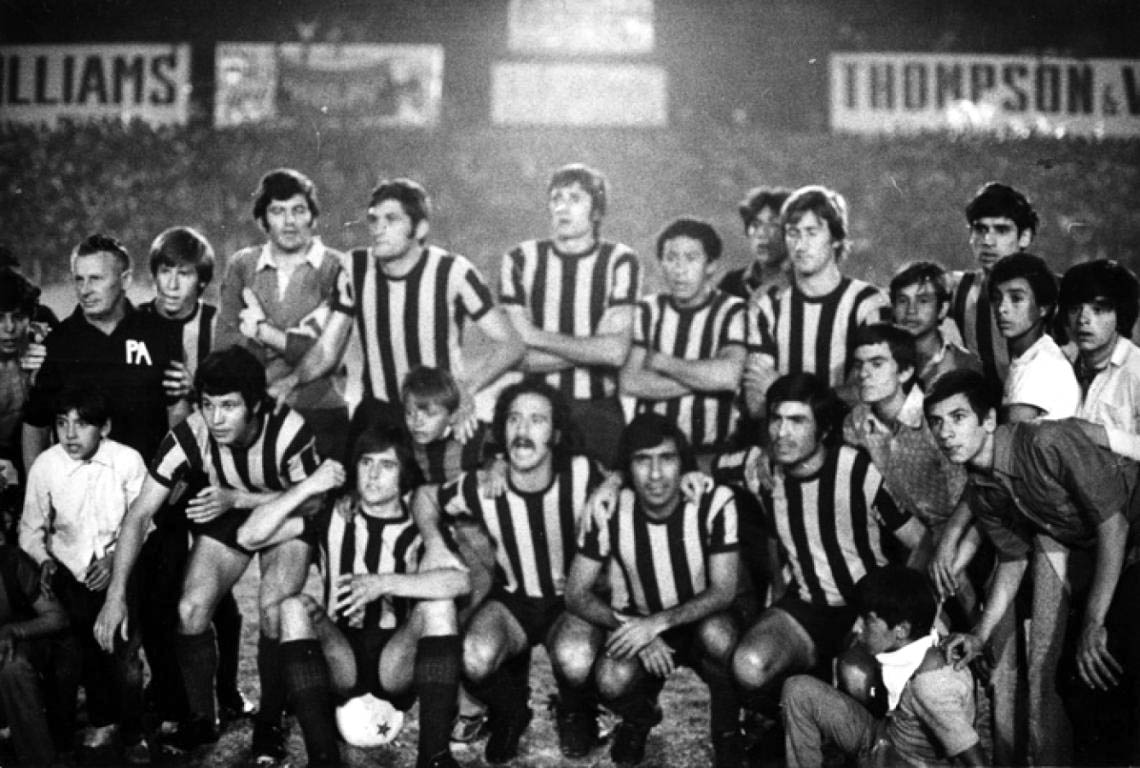
- Rosario Central, Nacional champions
- Season: 1971
- Dates: 8 October – 29 December
- Champions: Rosario Central (1st title)
- 1972 Copa Libertadores: Rosario Central; Independiente
- Top goalscorer: (Argentina) José Luñiz (Argentina) Alfredo Oberti (10 goals each)
- Biggest home win: Newell's 9–0 Huracán (CR) (20 Oct)
- Biggest away win: Huracán (BB) 0–5 Atlanta (21 Nov)

=== Group A ===
Pos	Team	Pld	W	D	L	GF	GA	GD	Pts	Qualification
1	Independiente	14	10	4	0	31	13	+18	24	Semifinals
2	Newell's Old Boys	14	9	5	0	37	10	+27	23	Semifinals
3	Belgrano	14	9	3	2	28	13	+15	21	
4	River Plate	14	8	5	1	26	13	+13	21	
5	Argentinos Juniors	14	7	1	6	22	22	0	15	
6	Ferro Carril Oeste	14	4	6	4	22	20	+2	14	
7	Banfield	14	4	5	5	23	22	+1	13	
8	Kimberley	14	4	5	5	22	21	+1	13	
9	San Martín (M)	14	3	6	5	20	20	0	12	
10	Gimnasia y Esgrima (LP)	14	3	3	8	22	30	−8	9	
11	Huracán	14	3	3	8	19	27	−8	9	
12	Juventud Antoniana	14	3	2	9	23	30	−7	8	
13	Don Orione	14	4	0	10	16	34	−18	8	
14	Huracán (CR)	14	1	1	12	11	55	−44	3	

=== Group B ===
Pos	Team	Pld	W	D	L	GF	GA	GD	Pts	Qualification
1	Rosario Central	14	9	3	2	27	13	+14	21	Semifinals
2	San Lorenzo	14	8	4	2	37	19	+18	20	Semifinals
3	Boca Juniors	14	8	4	2	34	17	+17	20	
4	Gimnasia y Esgrima (M)	14	7	5	2	28	21	+7	19	
5	Atlanta	14	6	4	4	25	17	+8	16	
6	Vélez Sársfield	14	5	6	3	21	20	+1	16	
7	Estudiantes (LP)	14	4	4	6	22	19	+3	12	
8	Racing	14	4	4	6	20	21	−1	12	
9	Chacarita Juniors	14	5	2	7	16	20	−4	12	
10	Colón	14	3	6	5	21	26	−5	12	
11	San Martín (T)	14	4	4	6	22	30	−8	12	
12	Guaraní Antonio Franco	14	3	4	7	18	26	−8	10	
13	Central Córdoba (SdE)	14	3	3	8	17	33	−16	9	
14	Huracán (IW)	14	2	4	8	7	25	−18	8	

=== Semifinals ===
Played in neutral venue:

Date	Team 1	Res.	Team 2	Venue	City
18 Dec	Independiente	2–2 (9–8, p)	San Lorenzo	River Plate	Buenos Aires
19 Dec	Rosario Central	1–0	Newell's Old Boys	River Plate	Buenos Aires

=== Final ===
Date	Team 1	Res.	Team 2	Venue	City
22 Dec	Rosario Central	2–1	San Lorenzo	Newell's O.B.	Rosario

==== Match details ====
1971 Campeonato Nacional Final
22 December 1971

Rosario Central	2–1	San Lorenzo
Gramajo 17'; Colman 23'	Report	Scotta 5'

Estadio Newell's Old Boys
Attendance: 31,915
Referee: Oscar Veiró

Rosario Central	San Lorenzo

GK	1	(Argentina) Norberto Menutti
DF	4	(Argentina) José González
DF	2	(Argentina) Aurelio Pascuttini
DF	6	(Argentina) Alberto Fanesi
DF	3	(Argentina) Mario Killer
MF	8	(Argentina) Carlos Aimar
MF	5	(Argentina) Ángel Landucci
MF	10	(Argentina) Carlos Colman
FW	7	(Argentina) Ramón Bóveda	(substituted off) 70'
FW	9	(Argentina) Aldo Poy
FW	11	(Argentina) Roberto Gramajo
Substitutes:
MF		(Argentina) Miguel Bustos	(substituted on) 70'
Manager:
(Argentina) Ángel Labruna

GK	1	(Argentina) Agustín Irusta
DF	4	(Argentina) Rubén Glaría
DF	2	(Argentina) Ricardo Rezza
DF	6	(Argentina) Ramón Heredia
DF	3	(Argentina) Antonio Rosl
MF	8	(Argentina) Enrique Chazarreta
MF	5	(Argentina) Roberto Telch
MF	10	(Argentina) Antonio G. Ameijenda
FW	7	(Argentina) Héctor Scotta
FW	9	(Argentina) Rodolfo Fischer	(substituted off) 74'
FW	11	(Argentina) Rubén Ayala
Substitutes:
FW		(Argentina) Hugo Promanzio	(substituted on) 74'
Manager:
(Argentina) Rogelio Domínguez

=== Liguilla pre-Libertadores ===
This qualifying method debuted in this season. It was contested by the Metropolitano champion and the Nacional runner-up.

Date	Team 1	Res.	Team 2	Venue	City
29 Dec	Independiente	1–0	San Lorenzo	La Bombonera	Buenos Aires

=== Top scorers ===
Rank.	Player	Team	Goals
1	(Argentina) José Luñiz	Juventud Antoniana	10
1	(Argentina) Alfredo Obberti	Newell's Old Boys	10
2	(Argentina) Carlos Morete	River Plate	9
2	(Argentina) Eduardo Quiroga	Belgrano (C)	9
3	(Argentina) Héctor Scotta	San Lorenzo	8
4	(Argentina) Pablo Díaz	Central Córdoba (SdE)	7
