= Roberto Gramajo =

Argentinian footballer (1947–2023)

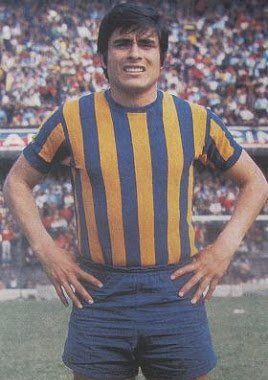
- Gramajo in 1970

Personal information
- Full name: Roberto Artemio Gramajo
- Date of birth: 28 July 1947
- Place of birth: La Banda, Santiago del Estero, Argentina
- Date of death: 1 July 2023 (aged 75)
- Place of death: Rosario, Santa Fe, Argentina
- Position: Forward

Youth career
- 1962–1966: Central Argentino de La Banda

Senior career*
Years	Team	Apps	(Gls)
1967–1972	Rosario Central	160	(57)
1972–1974	Panathinaikos	9	(2)
1974–1975	Huracán		
1976	Quilmes		
1977	Deportivo Cuenca		
1978	Jorge Newbery de Ucacha		
1987	Olimpo		

International career
1971–1972	Argentina	1	(0)
- * Club domestic league appearances and goals

Roberto Artemio Gramajo (28 July 1947 – 1 July 2023) was an Argentinian football player. Nicknamed "Chango", he played as a forward primarily during the 1970s; he was a part of football clubs such as Rosario Central, Panathinaikos and Huracán. He also briefly played for Argentina to be listed in the Brazil Independence Cup roster, despite not traveling with the team.

== Club career ==
=== Rosario Central ===
When he was fifteen years old, Gramajo began his career with Central Argentino de La Banda. When he turned sixteen, he was a starting player within his home province of Santiago del Estero. As an adolescent, he had issues with discipline and the demands placed on him. He began his senior career by signing with Rosario Central after a 4,750,000 Argentine peso transfer. Arriving at Rosario in 1967, he played in one match within the third before playing from the reserves for the rest of the year. He made his debut within the Argentine Primera División at the 1967 Campeonato Nacional against Platense in a 3–0 victory at the Estadio Marcelo Bielsa.

He then was able to become a starting player. As in his prior match, Gramajo would be the substitute for Enzo Gennoni, who had been removed from the starting line-up. He scored his first goal within the club in his second match against River Plate at the Estadio Monumental; despite his goal, the team lost with a score of 2–3 in the match. Due to his physical status not being the ideal for playing as a starter, Gramajo would return to the reserves to play as a substitute. During his second season with Rosario Central, he played in the 1968 Campeonato Metropolitano. In one tournament, he scored 11 goals, becoming the highest scorer for Rosario Central. During the 1968 Campeonato Metropolitano, he participated in nine matches, scoring two goals in the process.

In 1969, Rosario Central participated only in the 1969 Campeonato Metropolitano, scoring one goal in the tournament. Gramajo scored more during the 1970 Campeonato Metropolitano, playing in nineteen matches and scoring nine goals; he also played in thirteen matches during the 1970 Campeonato Nacional. Gramajo once recalled the night of 2 October 1970, which occurred during a televised match against Independiente at the Estadio Presidente Perón; the match ended with a score of 5–3. Another match he would remember from the season was the annual Rosario derby against Newell's Old Boys, in which Central would win 4–1 at the Estadio Marcelo Bielsa. When recalling the chronology of the match, he remembered partaking in a gambit against Carlos Fenoy in which he had the ball cross the goal line by approximately half a meter; he scored the goal by aiming with his right hand and he was described as being similar to a waiter carrying a tray.

During the 1971 Campeonato Metropolitano, he played in 32 matches and scored 5 goals. Following the club's qualification for the 1971 Copa Libertadores, he played in four matches and scored a goal during Rosario Central's match against Sporting Cristal. During the Metropolitano Championship on 22 August 1971, he would observe the 2–1 defeat against Racing, taking note of movements and the penalty kick of Juan Carlos Cárdenas after the two goalkeepers were expelled from the match. Afterwards, Gramajo executed 14 penalties while with Rosario Central, of which he converted 10; two were detoured, while another two were stopped in a scenario similar to that of the one occurring with Miguel Ángel Santoro during the 1970 Campeonato Nacional. Gramajo played as a right-winger during the 1971 Campeonato Nacional, in which he would be part of the winning team, along with players such as Ramón Bóveda and Aldo Poy, and play in 13 matches, scoring seven goals.

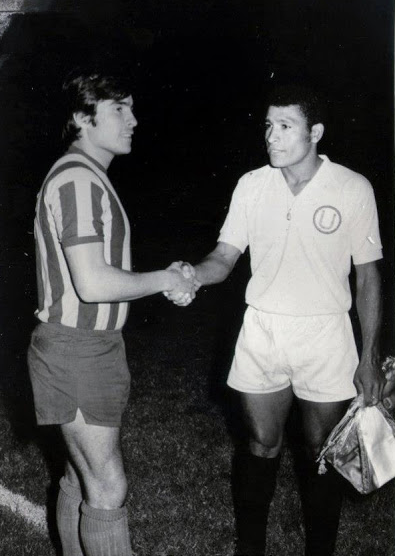
Gramajo with Héctor Chumpitaz of Universitario de Deportes in 1971.

His last season with Rosario Central occurred during the 1972 Campeonato Metropolitano, in which he would score three goals. During the subsequent 1972 Copa Libertadores, he scored the winning goal against Atlético Nacional in a 1–0 victory. During his time with Rosario Central, Gramajo played in 160 matches and scored 57 goals. He also played in sixteen Rosario Derbies and lost one of them, with the rest of the games resulting in five wins and ten draws. He scored five goals against the Rojinegros, having scored one against Jorge Traverso during 1969 and the other four against Carlos Fenoy, scoring two during the 1970 Campeonato Metropolitano in a 1–1 draw and a 3–1 victory, as well as an additional two in a 4–1 victory at the Campeonato Nacional, with one goal being the result of a penalty kick.

=== Career in Greece and return to Argentina ===
In 1972, Gramajo was transferred to the Greek club Panathinaikos. He played in nine matches and scored two goals during the 1972–73 and 1973–74 seasons, during which he was a part of Panathinaikos. He had issues in his relationship with the club's manager, Ferenc Puskás, so Gramajo decided to return to Argentina. He attempted to return to Rosario Central, but the club had already decided on making Mario Kempes his successor as the club's main midfielder.

In 1974, Gramajo decided to play for Club Atlético Huracán upon the request of the club's manager, César Luis Menotti. While within the club, he became one of the members of the Huracán squad to be a runner-up during the 1975 Campeonato Metropolitano. In 1976, he transferred over to Quilmes, in which he would play in 10 matches and score 3 goals. In 1977, he played in Ecuador, as he signed to play for Deportivo Cuenca, in which he would play in the 1977 Copa Libertadores. In 1978, he returned to Argentina again to play for Club Jorge Newbery de Ucacha; during his final season in 1987, he played for Atlético Olimpo Asociación Mutual.

== International career ==
He played for the Argentina national football team in a match against France on 8 January 1971 at La Bombonera. The match ended in a 4–3 victory for the French, with Gramajo being substituted for Ángel Marcos during the second half of the match. The team was managed by Juan José Pizzuti. Gramajo played alongside players such as Norberto Madurga, Roberto Perfumo, Juan Ramón Verón, Jorge Carrascosa, Alfredo Obberti. He was also listed for the Brazil Independence Cup, but Gramajo ultimately did not travel with the rest of the team.

== Death ==
Gramajo died on 1 July 2023.
