= Francisco Aguilar =

Francisco Aguilar may refer to:

- Francisco Aguilar y Leal (1776–1849), Spanish soldier
- Francisco Aguilar Barquero (1857–1924), Costa Rican president
- Francisco Aguilar (footballer, born 1949) (1949–2020), Spanish footballer
- Francisco Aguilar (footballer, born 1952), Spanish footballer
- Francisco V. Aguilar (born 1976 or 1977), American lawyer and politician
