= Lennart Larsson =

Lennart Larsson may refer to:

- Lennart Larsson (cross-country skier) (1930–2021), Swedish cross-country skier
- Lennart Larsson (footballer) (born 1953), former Swedish footballer
- Lennart Larsson (Malmö FF footballer), former Swedish footballer
