= Qualifying method of Copa Libertadores in Argentina =

Football tournament qualifying

The Copa Libertadores remains the most prestigious competition in South America for clubs, and the Primera División Argentina was the most successful league in the cup's history, having won the competition 24 times; Independiente has a record seven wins, followed by Boca Juniors with six, Estudiantes (LP) and River Plate with four, while Racing Club, Argentinos Juniors, Vélez Sarsfield and San Lorenzo have one apiece.

== Current qualifiers ==
As of 2026, six teams from Argentina were eligible to play the 2027 Copa Libertadores. Qualified teams are detailed as follows, with the number of berth detailed in brackets:

1. The champion of 2026 Apertura (Argentina 1) – Belgrano
2. The champion of 2026 Clausura (Argentina 2) – TBD
3. The champion of 2026 Copa Argentina (Argentina 3) – TBD
4. The best placed team from an aggregate table of the 2026 Liga Profesional Apertura and Clausura (Argentina 4) – TBD
5. The second best placed team from the same table (Argentina 5) – TBD
6. The third best placed team from the same table (Argentina 6) – TBD

Note

- Clubs qualified via aggregate table: the first two clubs qualify for Copa Libertadores group stage, while the third team qualifies for the second stage.
- In case an Argentine club wins the 2026 Copa Sudamericana, it will be added as the 7th. Argentine team for 2027.

== History ==
In the Argentine Primera División, several qualifying methods were once adopted in the history in order to determine the Argentine clubs representatives to participate in the tournament, that was firstly held in 1960. Since that year, the league format in Argentina has gone through several changes, and thus the method to qualify to Copa Libertadores has altered several times accordingly. Moreover, the increase of number of teams in Copa Libertadores also triggered some changes.

=== First systems ===
From 1960 to 1966, the Primera División was played using a double round-robin tournament system. In these years, the teams having the highest points would be crowned the champion and gain the eligibility to play in the Copa Libertadores in the following year.

In 1965 and 1966, thanks to the increase of the number of representative in Argentina, the runner-up of the In the Primera División, several qualifying methods were once adopted in the history in order to determine the Argentine clubs representatives to participate in the tournament, that was firstly held in 1960. Since that year, the league format in Argentina has gone through several changes, and thus the method to qualify to Copa Libertadores has altered several times accordingly. Moreover, the increase of number of teams in Copa Libertadores also triggered some changes. could also participate in next year's Copa Libertadores.

In 1967, the qualifying criteria were changed. Winning the Metropolitano did not gain eligibility in the Copa Libertadores. Instead, from 1967 to 1970, the champion and runner-up in the Nacional would be eligible to take part in the Copa Libertadores of the next year.

In 1971, the winner of the Nacional qualified to the Copa Libertadores directly. The winner of the Metropolitano regained the chance of qualification, as the Metropolitano champion would play against the runner-up of the Nacional in a Pre Libertadores Tournament to determine the allocation of the second spot in Copa Libertadores. The Metropolitano champion Independiente won San Loranzo 1–0 in the tournament.

In 1972, the qualifying method was changed back to the system of 1968–70. The winner and runner-up of the Nacional, San Loranzo and River Plate respectively, represented Argentina to play in the Copa Libertadores 1973.

In 1973, the champion of the Metropolitano and Nacional qualified to 1974 Copa Libertadores directly. Huracán and Rosario Central qualified by winner each tournament respectively.

In 1974, a Pre Libertadores Tournament was held to determine the qualifying teams. The tournament was contested by Rosario Central, as the runner-up of both Metropolitano and Nacional, Newell's Old Boys, as the champion of Metropolitano and San Lorenzo, as the champion of Nacional. The tournament was held in a single round-robin format. Rosario Central and Newell's Old Boys, the first two teams in the table, qualified to Copa Libertadores 1975.

Starting from 1975, the qualifying method of 1967 was re-adopted. The winner of the Metropolitano and Nacional would automatically qualify to participate the Copa Libertadores in the following year.

When the same team had won both tournaments, a Pre-Libertadores Tournament played by the runners-up of each tournament was held to determine the qualification. This scenario happened three times, namely in 1975, 1976 and 1979. In 1975 and 1976, a single-legged match was played, while in 1979, the tournament was contested in two legs.

In 1985, only the Nacional was held. The Metropolitano was not held, paving the way for the new European style seasons. The champion of Nacional 1985 and the new tournament 1985–86 would qualify to the Copa Libertadores 1986.

Argentinos Juniors won the Nacional 1985, so it gained the eligibility for the 1986 edition. However, it also won the 1985 edition, and thus qualified to next season's tournament automatically, along with River Plate, who won the 1985–86 title. Therefore, the runner-up of the 1985 Nacional, Vélez Sársfield, qualified for a Liguilla Pre-Libertadores tournament with the second to seventh-placed teams from the new double round-robin domestic 1985–96 league (together with 6 provincial qualifiers), to compete for the remaining qualification, and this tournament was won by Boca Juniors.

=== Liguilla Pre-Libertadores ===
From 1986 to 1990, the champion of the Primera División earned a place directly, whilst a Liguilla Pre-Libertadores tournament was held every year to determine the second qualifying team.

Eight teams participated in the Pre-Libertadores tournament, and it was competed under a two-legged knock-out format with the winner qualifying to the Copa Libertadores. Teams participating in this tournament were not solely drawn from the Primera División in the early years. A few teams from the Primera B Nacional, whose number varied each year, also took part in the competition.

In 1986–87, the second to sixth teams in the Primera División competed in the tournament with the first three placed teams in the Nacional B. For the next season, 1987–88, the second to eighth teams joined the competition alongside the champion of Nacional B. The winner of the Liguilla Classificación tournament this season, which was competed by the Primera Division teams that had not qualified to the Liguilla Pre-Libertadores tournament (excepting the two relegated teams), also qualified to the Liguilla Pre-Libertadores tournament of the following year.

The 1988–89 season qualified teams to 1989 Copa Libertadores as well as 1990 edition, as a result of the Libertadores changing format so that it was played in the first half of the calendar year. The first half of the season was regarded as a tournament in itself, named "Apertura" tournament. The top two teams after the first half of the season qualified to 1989 Copa Libertadores.

After the end of the overall season of 1988–89, as in previous years, the champion of the league qualified directly and a Liguilla Pre-Libertadores tournament was held to decide the second qualifying team to 1990 Copa Libertadores. The only difference was that the qualifying teams participate in Copa Libertadores of the next season instead of the same one. The second to seventh teams from the whole season tournament, as well as Platense, the champion of the Liguilla Classificación tournament of previous season, competed in the tournament, plus the Nacional B champion. This was a double-elimination tournament and the best placed team in this season's Liguilla Classificación tournament, which was the losers bracket of the Liguilla Pre-Libertadores tournament, got the opportunity to participate in the Liguilla Pre-Libertadores tournament in the following season.

For the 1989–90 season, the normal method was reused except qualifications were now for the 1991 Copa Libertadores. The champion of the Primera División gained direct qualification and a Liguilla Pre-Libertadores tournament was contested for the other spot. The number of teams in the Liguilla Pre-Libertadores tournament was reduced to four, with all of them coming from the Primera División. The second to fourth teams in the Primera División entered this tournament, as well as Deportivo Español, the best placed team in the previous season's Liguilla Classificación tournament.

In the 1990–91 season, the format of Argentine football changed again. Since this season, instead of playing only one double round-robin tournament, two competitions have been held each year, namely, the Apertura and Clausura. In 1990–91, a final was played between the champions of these tournaments, to determine the ultimate winner of the season. The ultimate winner was also eligible for the Copa Libertadores, while the loser needed to play in the Liguilla Pre-Libertadores tournament to compete for qualification. In this season, the Liguilla Pre-Libertadores tournament also featured the second to fourth teams in the Apertura and the second to fifth teams in the Clausura.

This practice was very controversial, especially since Boca Juniors lost the final against Newell's Old Boys, costing Boca Juniors its first official championship since 1981 despite an unbeaten run in the 1991 Clausura.

As a result, in the following season, the winner of the Apertura and Clausura tournaments did not compete in a Final but both of them were crowned the champions. However, a three-legged Liguilla Pre-Libertadores tournament between the winners was contested, and the winner of the tournament would qualify directly to Copa Libertadores.

The second to fifth teams in both the Apertura and Clausura entered an Octagonal tournament, which was a one-legged knock-out tournament. As the second to fifth team in the Apertura finished second, fourth, fifth and eighth in the Clausura, the sixth, seventh and ninth teams in the Clausura were eligible to play in the Octagonal tournament. The winner of the tournament, Vélez Sársfield then played against the loser of the Liguilla Pre-Libertadores tournament, Newell's Old Boys, to compete for the second spot of Copa Libertadores. Newell's Old Boys won the match 1–0.

=== Recent methods ===
From 1992–93 (for 1994 Copa Libertadores), the champions of the Apertura and Clausura tournaments got the eligibility for Copa Libertadores directly. When the same team won both tournaments, as was the case in 1995/96, 1996/97 and 1998/99, the runner-up of each tournament played a one-legged play-off to decide the qualification.

Since 1999, the champions of each tournament, Apertura and Clausura and the best teams in the aggregate table qualified to play the Libertadores. The number of seats for Argentine clubs increased to four in 1998–99 (for 2000 Copa Libertadores) and a new method was adopted in this season, which was used until 2007. The places of Copa Libertadores are allocated to the champions of Apertura and Clausura of the previous season, as well as the two best teams which have gained the highest number of points considering the combined table of Apertura and Clausura besides the two champions. The number of representatives increased to five in the 2003/04 season and the third team in the aggregate table also qualifies. For example, 2008 Copa Libertadores was represented by the 2006 Apertura champion Estudiantes (LP), 2007 Clausura champion San Lorenzo de Almagro, and the three best placed teams in the combined table of both tournaments. Though 2007 Apertura was held much closer to 2008 Copa Libertadores, the champion of that season cannot get the place because it was considered to be the same season of 2008 Copa Libertadores. So, champions of the Apertura have to wait for more than a year to play in the Copa Libertadores.

When the same team wins both tournaments, as in 2005–06, the fourth team in the aggregate table also gets the eligibility.

Moreover, since the inauguration session, the Copa Libertadores champion has qualified automatically to the following session's tournament, like Boca Juniors in 2007. However, unlike the European practice, the nation receives an extra place in the tournament to accommodate the holder. So there were six Argentine teams playing in 2008 Copa Libertadores instead of five.

For the 2008 Apertura, champions and teams with best average in the last three championships were eligible to play the Cup. After employing the old method for nearly a decade, a new method was adopted in season 2007–08, qualifying for Copa Libertadores 2009. The method is transitional, as it was used to prepare for the employment of the system that would be used in the following season.

In that season, the champion of Apertura 2007, Clausura 2008 and also Apertura 2008 (i.e. the champion of the first half of the next season) would gain a place in Copa Libertadores 2009. Moreover, the best two teams having the best average points in 2007 Apertura, 2008 Clausura, and 2008 Apertura would also gain a place.

After the reform, the champions of Apertura could play immediately in the Copa Libertadores in the next calendar year, instead of waiting for a year in the past. This is regarded as a major improvement of the system.

In the 2009–10 season, champions and teams with best average in the aggregate table in a calendar year were eligible for the tournament. Since 2009 Clausura, the champions of Clausura and Apertura in the same calendar year (though they are in different seasons) would qualify for the Copa Libertadores in the coming calendar year. The other three places would be gained by the teams with best aggregate points in the Clausura and Apertura in the same calendar year. For example, the best three non-champions teams of the aggregate table of Clausure 2009 and Apertura 2009 would gain the berths of Copa Libertadores 2010.

In 2011 Copa Libertadores, the most recent Copa Sudamericana champion would earn a berth in the tournament. However, the country of the Copa Sudamericana champion would not gain an extra berth. The Copa Sudamericana champion would take the lowest-placed berth already assigned to the country if they did not qualify for the Copa Libertadores through domestic performance. Since 2010 Copa Sudamericana was won by Independiente, Independiente got the last berth and the team with the third highest point in the aggregate table lost the place.

Since 2010 to 2012, the champions of each tournament and two teams with best average points in the aggregate table and the best Argentine team in Copa Sudamericana not yet qualified, were eligible to play the Copa Libertadores. The system change again in 2010. Gaining idea from the arrangement of last year, the third team in the aggregate table could not qualify for the competition. Its place was taken by the best performing Argentine team in the Copa Sudamericana in the last year.

Since the league format of Primera División changed in 2013 Final, and the Copa Argentina was put into circulation again (the last edition had been played in 1970), the qualifying method was amended once more. Besides the champion of 2013 Torneo Inicial and Final, which gained a place as usual, the champion of so-called "Super Final", i.e. the winning team between the champion of 2012 Torneo Inicial and 2013 Torneo Final, would also gain a place.

Furthermore, the champion of Copa Argentina would also gain a place in the following season. The best performing Argentine team in the Copa Sudamericana still retained its place. If the above places were occupied by the same team, the best team in the aggregate table, which was still not yet qualified, would gain the berth.

=== Changes announced ===
In 2024, AFA announced (through bulletin n° 6604) that they were revising the qualifying method not only for Copa Libertadores but for Copa Sudamericana too. Qualification would be based on a ranking of clubs to be made according to their performances in domestic and international championships. The ranking would include teams performances from the 2021 Primera División championship (the first organised by Liga Profesional de Fútbol, an entity established after the demise of Superliga Argentina.

== See also ==
- Copa Libertadores
- Argentine Primera División
- Argentine football league system
- Apertura and Clausura in Argentine football
- Metropolitano championship
- Nacional championship
- Copa Sudamericana
