= José Pacheco (footballer) =

Spanish footballer (1947–2022)

Personal information
- Full name: José Luis Pacheco Gómez
- Date of birth: 14 January 1947
- Place of birth: Santander, Spain
- Date of death: 27 September 2022 (aged 75)
- Place of death: Santander, Spain
- Position: Goalkeeper

Senior career*
Years	Team	Apps	(Gls)
1967–1979	Atlético Madrid	56	(0)
1979–1980	Racing Santander	0	(0)
1980–1981	Logroñés	29	(0)
Total		85	(0)
- * Club domestic league appearances and goals

José Luis Pacheco Gómez (14 January 1947 – 27 September 2022) was a Spanish footballer who played as a goalkeeper.

== Career ==
Pacheco played for Atlético Madrid between 1967 and 1979, being a member of the squads which won the Spanish League in 1972–73 and 1976–77, the Intercontinental Cup in 1974, and the Copa del Rey in 1972 and 1976. During his time with the club, he was used mainly as a back-up behind first Rodri then Miguel Reina.

== Post-playing career ==
After his retirement from playing, Pacheco worked as a radio presenter at Radio Rioja Cadena SER.

== Death ==
Pacheco died in Santander on 28 September 2022, at the age of 75.
