= Panadero Díaz =

Argentine footballer (1946–2018)

Rubén Osvaldo Díaz
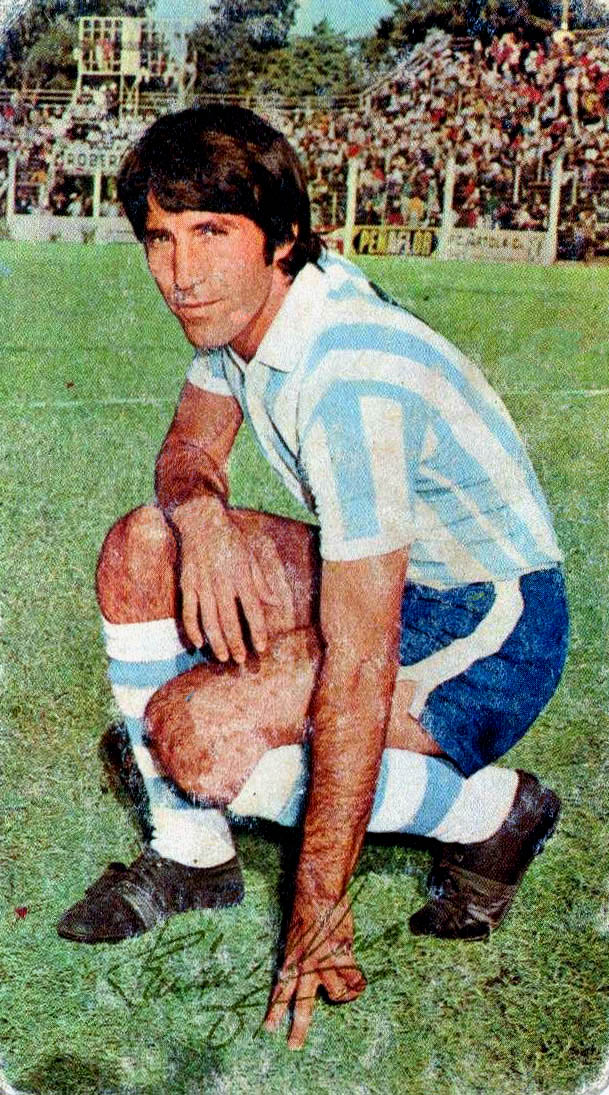
- Díaz with Racing Club in 1970

Personal information
- Full name: Rubén Osvaldo Díaz Figueras
- Date of birth: 8 January 1946
- Place of birth: Buenos Aires, Argentina
- Date of death: 16 January 2018 (aged 72)
- Place of death: Buenos Aires, Argentina
- Position: Defender

Senior career*
Years	Team	Apps	(Gls)
1965–1973	Racing Club	239 (total)	(19)
1974–1977	Atlético Madrid	57	(1)
1977–1978	Racing Club	(see above)	

International career
1972	Argentina		
- * Club domestic league appearances and goals as of 2 November 2007

Rubén Osvaldo Díaz Figueras (8 January 1946 – 16 January 2018) was an Argentine footballer. He played as a defender for Racing Club in Argentina and Atlético Madrid in Spain. He was nicknamed Panadero Díaz (baker Díaz) because his father owned a bakery.

== Biography ==
"Panadero" Díaz was born in Buenos Aires and started his professional career in 1965 with Racing Club de Avellaneda. In 1966 he was part of the team that won the Argentine league. The following season they won in the Copa Libertadores 1967, the first and only time that Racing Club have been Libertadores champions. Later that year they beat Celtic F.C. of Scotland in the Copa Intercontinental to become the first Argentine team to be crowned club champions of the world.

In 1974 Díaz joined Atlético Madrid where he won a second Copa Intercontinental in 1974, beating Racing Clubs fiercest rivals; Club Atlético Independiente. He also won a Copa del Rey and a league title with Atlético before returning to Argentina in 1977.

"Panadero" returned to Racing Club but only played on until 1978 when he retired from top-class football. He was named in the Clarín all-time Racing Club team.

Diaz died after complications on a planned aortic aneurysm operation at the Favaloro Foundation Hospital

== Honours ==
=== Club ===
Racing Club

- Primera División: 1966
- Copa Libertadores: 1967
- Intercontinental Cup: 1967

Atlético Madrid

- Intercontinental Cup: 1974
- Copa del Rey: 1976
- Spanish League: 1976–77
