= Eugenio Leal =

Spanish footballer

Personal information
- Full name: Eugenio Leal Vargas
- Date of birth: 13 May 1954 (age 72)
- Place of birth: Carriches, Spain
- Height: 1.78 m (5 ft 10 in)
- Position: Midfielder

Youth career
- La Salle
- Atlético Madrid

Senior career*
Years	Team	Apps	(Gls)
1971–1982	Atlético Madrid	185	(24)
1973–1974	→ Sporting Gijón (loan)	23	(4)
1983	Sabadell	2	(0)
Total		210	(28)

International career
1970–1971	Spain U18	8	(0)
1973–1976	Spain amateur	3	(0)
1977–1978	Spain	13	(1)
- * Club domestic league appearances and goals

Eugenio Leal Vargas (born 13 May 1954) is a Spanish former professional footballer who played as a midfielder.

He spent most of his 12-year professional career with Atlético Madrid, appearing in more than 230 competitive games and winning two La Liga championships.

A Spain international for one year, Leal represented the country at the 1978 World Cup.

== Club career ==
Born in Carriches, Province of Toledo, Castilla-La Mancha, Leal finished his youth career with Atlético Madrid. After alternating between the first team and the amateur reserves to start with, he was loaned to fellow La Liga team Sporting de Gijón, returning to the Vicente Calderón Stadium late into the 1973–74 season to play the Copa del Rey as the foreign players were not eligible for the tournament. He started playing football as a forward, but manager and his former teammate Luis Aragonés reconverted him to a midfielder.

In a derby against Real Madrid in 1979, Leal suffered a knee ligament injury following a challenge from Juan Sol from which he never fully recovered. He left the Colchoneros in June 1982 with only eight games in two years to his credit and, after a few months at CE Sabadell FC to help them prevent relegation from Segunda División, which eventually did not befell, he retired at the age of 29.

Leal helped Atlético to the 1973 and 1977 domestic leagues, contributing a total of 42 matches and four goals to these achievements. After retiring, he settled in Granada and worked as a stockbroker.

== International career ==
Leal earned the first of his 13 caps for Spain on 16 April 1977, in a 1–0 away loss against Romania for the 1978 FIFA World Cup qualifiers. Six months later, in the same phase and facing the same opponents, he scored in the 2–0 win in Madrid.

Selected to the finals in Argentina by coach László Kubala, Leal featured in three games in an eventual group-stage exit.

=== International goals ===
#	Date	Venue	Opponent	Score	Result	Competition
1.	26 October 1977	Vicente Calderón, Madrid, Spain	Romania	1–0	2–0	1978 World Cup qualification

== Honours ==
Atlético Madrid

- La Liga: 1972–73, 1976–77
- Copa del Generalísimo: 1975–76
- Intercontinental Cup: 1974
