= Leivinha =

Brazilian footballer (1949–2026)

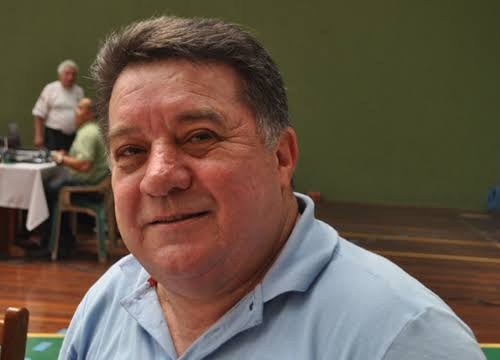

Personal information
- Full name: João Leiva Campos Filho
- Date of birth: 11 September 1949
- Place of birth: Novo Horizonte, São Paulo, Brazil
- Date of death: 4 June 2026 (aged 76)
- Place of death: São Paulo, Brazil
- Height: 1.75 m (5 ft 9 in)
- Position: Forward

Youth career
- Linense

Senior career*
Years	Team	Apps	(Gls)
1965–1966	Linense		
1966–1970	Portuguesa	177	(62)
1971–1975	Palmeiras	263	(106)
1975–1979	Atlético Madrid	94	(43)
1979	São Paulo	11	(2)

International career
1972–1974	Brazil	21	(7)
- * Club domestic league appearances and goals

João Leiva Campos Filho (11 September 1949 – 4 June 2026), usually called Leivinha (Little Leiva), was a Brazilian footballer who played as a forward or as a winger.

== Club career ==
At club level, Leivinha played for Linense, Portuguesa, Palmeiras, Atlético de Madrid and São Paulo, winning national championships in both Brazil and Spain, as well as the UEFA and Intercontinental Cups.

== International career ==
Leivinha achieved 21 international caps for the Brazil national team, from June 1972 until June 1974, scoring seven goals. He appeared in three games Brazil at the 1974 FIFA World Cup.

== Personal life and death ==
Leivinha was the uncle of former Grêmio and Liverpool midfielder Lucas Leiva.

Leivinha died on 4 June 2026, at the age of 76.

== Honours ==
Palmeiras

- Brazilian Série A: 1972, 1973
- São Paulo State League: 1972, 1974

Atletico Madrid

- Spanish League: 1976–77
- Copa del Rey: 1975-76

Brazil

- Independence Cup: 1972
