= Ramón Heredia =

Argentine footballer

Personal information
- Full name: Ramón Armando Heredia Ruarte
- Date of birth: 26 February 1951 (age 75)
- Place of birth: Córdoba, Argentina
- Height: 1.76 m (5 ft 9 in)
- Position: Defender

Senior career*
| Years | Team | Apps | (Gls) |
| 1969–1973 | San Lorenzo | 119 | (19) |
| 1973–1977 | Atlético Madrid | 79 | (15) |
| 1977–1979 | Paris Saint-Germain | 22 | (1) |
| Total | | 220 | (35) |

International career
| 1970–1975 | Argentina | 30 | (2) |

Managerial career
- 1992: Toledo
- 1993: Atlético Madrid
- 1993: Atlético Madrid
- 1994–1995: Cádiz
- 1997–1998: San Pedro
- * Club domestic league appearances and goals

Ramón Armando Heredia Ruarte (born 26 February 1951 in Córdoba) is an Argentine former football defender who played for the Argentina national team.

Heredia started his playing career in 1969 with San Lorenzo in Argentina. He was part of the squad that won both league titles in 1972. He joined Atlético Madrid in 1973 and played in the 1974 European Cup Final. An undisputed starter in his first three years, he lost his regular place in the 4th due to injuries (as atletico won the league title). He then moved to Paris Saint-Germain, where again he would be used rarely. After two seasons with the latter, he chose to retire.

Heredia, (nicknamed Cacho) played 30 times for Argentina, including appearances at the 1974 FIFA World Cup.

After he retired from playing, Heredia became a football coach. He began by managing CD Toledo and Real Ávila CF, before he was appointed manager of Atlético Madrid in 1993. He also managed Cádiz CF and UD San Pedro.

== Honours ==
San Lorenzo

- Primera Division Argentina: 1972 Metropolitano, 1972 Nacional
- Copa Argentina Final Canceled: 1970

Atlético de Madrid

- European Cup Runner-up: 1973-74
- Copa Intercontinental: 1974
- Copa del Rey: 1975-76
- La Liga: 1976-77
