= Carriches =

Coordinates: 39°58′N 4°27′W

- municipality
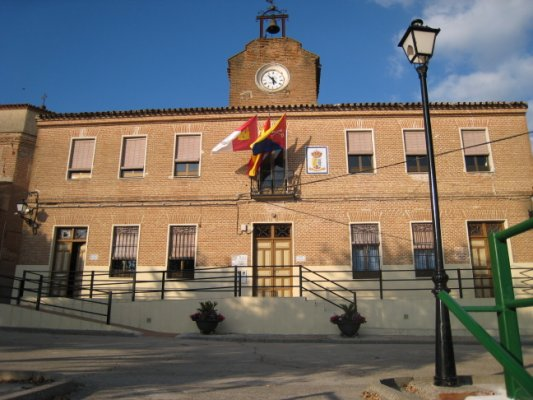
- Town Hall

- Flag Coat of arms
- Interactive map of Carriches
- Country: Spain
- Autonomous community: Castile-La Mancha
- Province: Toledo
- Municipality: Carriches

Area
  - Total: 19 km^{2} (7.3 sq mi)
- Elevation: 553 m (1,814 ft)

Population (2025-01-01)
  - Total: 260
  - Density: 14/km^{2} (35/sq mi)
- Time zone: UTC+1 (CET)
  - Summer (DST): UTC+2 (CEST)

Carriches is a municipality located in the province of Toledo, Castile-La Mancha, Spain. According to the 2006 census (INE), the municipality has a population of 296 inhabitants.

== Demographics ==
Historical population
Year	Pop.	±%
1900	716	—
1910	832	+16.2%
1920	838	+0.7%
1930	887	+5.8%
1940	881	−0.7%
1950	921	+4.5%
1960	753	−18.2%
1970	414	−45.0%
1981	317	−23.4%
1991	298	−6.0%
2001	287	−3.7%
2011	315	+9.8%
2021	278	−11.7%
2023	270	−2.9%
Source: INE
