= Ramón Bóveda =

Argentine footballer

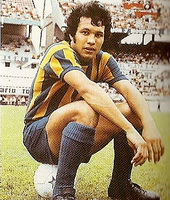

Personal information
- Full name: Ramón César Bóveda
- Date of birth: 18 March 1949 (age 77)
- Place of birth: Pirané, Argentina
- Position: Winger

Senior career*
Years	Team	Apps	(Gls)
1968–1976	Rosario Central		
1976–1977	Atlético Nacional		
1978–1979	Rosario Central		
1980–1981	Platense		
1982	Sarmiento de Junín		
1983	Unión San Vicente		

International career
1972–1975	Argentina	8	(1)
- * Club domestic league appearances and goals

Ramón César Bóveda (born 18 March 1949 in Pirané, Argentina) is an Argentine former footballer who played as a winger. As a player, he participated in the 1975 Copa América with Argentina.

== Honours ==
Rosario Central

- Primera División: 2

1971 Nacional, 1973 Nacional

Atlético Nacional

- Campeonato Profesional: 1

1976
