= Marcelino Pérez =

Spanish footballer

Marcelino
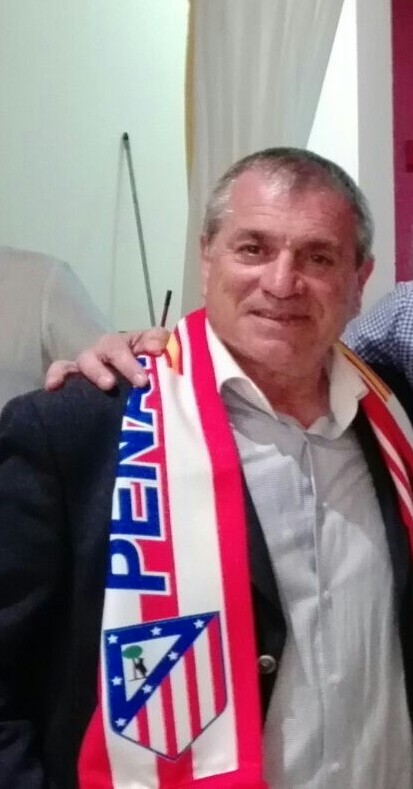
- Marcelino Pérez, former football player of Club Atlético de Madrid

Personal information
- Full name: Marcelino Pérez Ayllón
- Date of birth: 13 August 1955 (age 71)
- Place of birth: Sabadell, Spain
- Height: 1.72 m (5 ft 8 in)
- Position: Defender

Youth career
- 1966–1969: Mercantil
- 1969–1972: Sabadell

Senior career*
| Years | Team | Apps | (Gls) |
| 1972–1974 | Sabadell | 54 | (0) |
| 1974–1984 | Atlético Madrid | 190 | (3) |
| 1985 | Conquense | | |

International career
| 1972–1974 | Spain U18 | 8 | (1) |
| 1976–1977 | Spain U21 | 2 | (0) |
| 1980 | Spain B | 2 | (0) |
| 1977–1979 | Spain | 13 | (0) |

Managerial career
- 1994: Cádiz
- 1997–1998: Carabanchel
- 1999: Talavera
- 2011: Tomelloso
- * Club domestic league appearances and goals

Marcelino Pérez Ayllón (born 13 August 1955 in Sabadell, Barcelona, Catalonia), known simply as Marcelino, is a Spanish retired footballer who played as a defender, mostly for Atlético Madrid.

== Honours ==
Atlético Madrid

- La Liga: 1976–77
- Copa del Generalísimo: 1975–76
- Copa del Rey: 1984–85
- Intercontinental Cup: 1974

Individual

- La Liga Team of The Year: 1978, 1979
