= Amaral (footballer, born 1954) =

Brazilian footballer (1954–2024)

Personal information
- Full name: João Justino Amaral dos Santos
- Date of birth: 25 December 1954
- Place of birth: Campinas, São Paulo, Brazil
- Date of death: 31 May 2024 (aged 69)
- Place of death: São Paulo, Brazil
- Position: Defender

Senior career*
Years	Team	Apps	(Gls)
1971–1978	Guarani	176	(1)
1979–1981	Corinthians	133	(1)
1981–1982	Santos	35	(0)
1982–1984	América (MEX)		
1984–1986	Leones Negros UdG	186	(3)
1987	Blumenau	0	(0)

International career
1975–1980	Brazil	40	(0)
Medal record
Men's association football
Representing Brazil
FIFA World Cup
Bronze medal – third place	1978 Argentina	Team
- * Club domestic league appearances and goals

João Justino Amaral dos Santos, known as Amaral or Amaral II (Portuguese pronunciation: [amaˈɾaw]; 25 December 1954 – 31 May 2024), was a Brazilian professional footballer who played as a defender.

== Career ==
At club level he played for Guarani (1971–1978), Corinthians (1978–1981), Santos (1981–1982), in Mexico with Leones Negros de la Universidad de Guadalajara (1981–1985), and closed his career in 1987 with Blumenau.

Amaral won one Campeonato Paulista (1979) with Corinthians and one Mexican First Division (1983–84) with Club América.

At international level, he was capped 41 times by the Brazil national team, from August 1975 to June 1980, and with them he won the Bicentennial Tournament in 1976 and participated in seven games at the 1978 FIFA World Cup, where the team finished third.

== Death ==
On 31 May 2024, Amaral died from cancer in São Paulo, at the age of 69.

== Honours ==
Corinthans

- Campeonato Paulista: 1979

América

- Liga MX: 1983–84

Brazil

- USA Bicentennial Cup: 1976
- Taça do Atlântico: 1976
- Copa Rio Branco: 1976
- Copa Roca: 1976
