= Francisco Aguilar y Leal =

- Born: 1776; Santa Cruz de Tenerife, Canary Islands; Spain
- Died: 1840 (aged 63–64); Maldonado, Uruguay
- Occupations: soldier, a Spanish merchant

Francisco Aguilar y Leal (1776–1840) was a soldier and Spanish merchant, who became one of the main leaders of Uruguayan independence.

== Life and the military ==
Francisco Aguilar y Leal was born in 1776 in Santa Cruz de Tenerife, Canary Islands, Spain. Later, he moved to Arrecife, on the island of Lanzarote. Here, in the early nineteenth century, he chartered an expedition of 200 people from the island bound for Montevideo, Uruguay, starting the Canarian emigration from the eastern islands to that place (after the Canary emigration that took place in Uruguay in the first half of the eighteenth century), which basically would not terminate until 1900, emigrating more than 10,000 people in this period. He worked as a Merchant in the Canary Island. Later, he moved to Maldonado, Uruguay, arriving with a lot of money from the Canary island. Here, he continued working as a trader and cemented a fortune in the agricultural businesses, commercial and industrial: His ships performed the traffic in goods imports and exports, with trade contacts with London, Brazil and the United States. He also won the concession of the exploitation of seals and whales, whose leather in the first case, and oils had a strong demand abroad. He served in this office for twelve years.

On the other hand, he was one of the people who fought most for the independence of Uruguay, presenting important services to the struggle for independence. He supported the Revolution of 1811 and helped resist the Portuguese invasion of the Banda Oriental (1811–1812). He paid the company of the Thirty-Three Orientals and he led an army that participated in the fighting against the Luso-Brazilian occupation (1816-1820). Later, between 1835 and 1840, he was Minister of Finance of the Republic. During these moments, he was committed to the development of the city of Maldonado, which promoted its port, agriculture and industry. He died in Montevideo in 1840.

== Personal life ==
In regard to their productive activities in Uruguayan territory, he excelled in the creation of a factory of tile and ceramics and in the introduction of new crops in Maldonado. He had also salt and brick factories for construction factories. In his vast property he cultivated cereal, vegetables and vines. He had also farms of cows, horses and merino sheep.
