= Rubén Cano =

Argentine-Spanish footballer

Personal information
- Full name: Rubén Andrés Cano Martínez
- Date of birth: 5 February 1951 (age 75)
- Place of birth: San Rafael, Argentina
- Height: 1.82 m (6 ft 0 in)
- Position: Striker

Youth career
- San Rafael

Senior career*
Years	Team	Apps	(Gls)
1970–1974	Atlanta	161	(47)
1974–1976	Elche	60	(12)
1976–1982	Atlético Madrid	168	(81)
1982–1985	Tenerife	63	(31)
1985–1987	Rayo Vallecano	49	(19)
Total		501	(190)

International career
1977–1979	Spain	12	(4)
- * Club domestic league appearances and goals

Rubén Andrés Cano Martínez (born 5 February 1951) is an Argentine-Spanish retired professional footballer who played as a striker.

He appeared in 228 La Liga matches over eight seasons (93 goals) with two teams, mainly Atlético Madrid.

Cano represented Spain at the 1978 World Cup.

== Club career ==
Born in San Rafael, Mendoza, Argentina to Spanish parents, Cano started his professional career with Buenos Aires–based Club Atlético Atlanta, remaining four years with the team. In 1974, he returned to the land of his ancestors and joined Elche CF, making his La Liga debut on 14 September 1974 in a 1–0 home win against Atlético Madrid and ending his first season with six goals in 32 games as the Valencians finished in eighth position.

In the 1976 off-season, Cano signed for precisely Atlético Madrid, scoring 19 times in his first year – fifth-best in the competition – as the Colchoneros won the national championship, one point ahead of FC Barcelona. He added a combined 40 in the following two seasons, and formed an efficient forward partnership during his spell with another Argentine-born player, Rubén Ayala.

After only 12 matches (one goal) in 1981–82, the 32-year-old Cano left Atlético and joined CD Tenerife in the third division, helping the Canary Islands side promote in his debut season and remaining with them for a further two second level campaigns; he closed out his career at the age of 36 after a couple of years with another club in Madrid, second-tier Rayo Vallecano.

== International career ==
Cano chose to represent Spain internationally, going on to win 12 caps in two years. His debut occurred on 16 April 1977 in a 1978 FIFA World Cup qualifier against Romania (0–1 loss in Bucharest); also in that competition, he scored the game's only goal in Belgrade on 30 November to help his adopted nation defeat Yugoslavia and top its group.

Picked for the finals in Argentina, Cano appeared in the 1–2 defeat to Austria, in an eventual group stage exit.

== Honours ==
Atlético Madrid

- La Liga: 1976–77

== See also ==
- List of Spain international footballers born outside Spain
