= Paco Bermejo =

Spanish footballer

Personal information
- Full name: Francisco Javier Bermejo Caballero
- Date of birth: 9 March 1955 (age 71)
- Place of birth: Badajoz, Spain
- Height: 1.73 m (5 ft 8 in)
- Position: Midfielder

Senior career*
| Years | Team | Apps | (Gls) |
| 1973–1981 | Atlético Madrid | | |

International career
- Spain
- * Club domestic league appearances and goals

Francisco Javier Bermejo Caballero (born 9 March 1955), known as Paco Bermejo, is a Spanish footballer who played as a midfielder for Atlético Madrid. He competed in the men's tournament at the 1976 Summer Olympics.
