= Francisco Sanjosé =

Spanish footballer (1952–2026)

Personal information
- Full name: Francisco Sanjosé García
- Date of birth: 12 November 1952
- Place of birth: Seville, Spain
- Date of death: April 2026 (aged 73)
- Place of death: Seville, Spain
- Height: 1.67 m (5 ft 6 in)
- Position: Defender

Senior career*
Years	Team	Apps	(Gls)
1970–1986	Sevilla	303	(15)
1971–1972	Sevilla Atlético	0	(0)
Total		303	(15)

International career
1976	Spain Olympic football team	1	(0)
- * Club domestic league appearances and goals

Francisco Sanjosé García (12 November 1952 – April 2026) was a Spanish professional footballer who played as a defender for Sevilla. He competed with the Spain Olympic football team in the men's tournament at the 1976 Summer Olympics. Sanjosé died in April 2026, at the age of 73.
