= Rubén Ayala =

Argentine footballer & manager (born 1950)

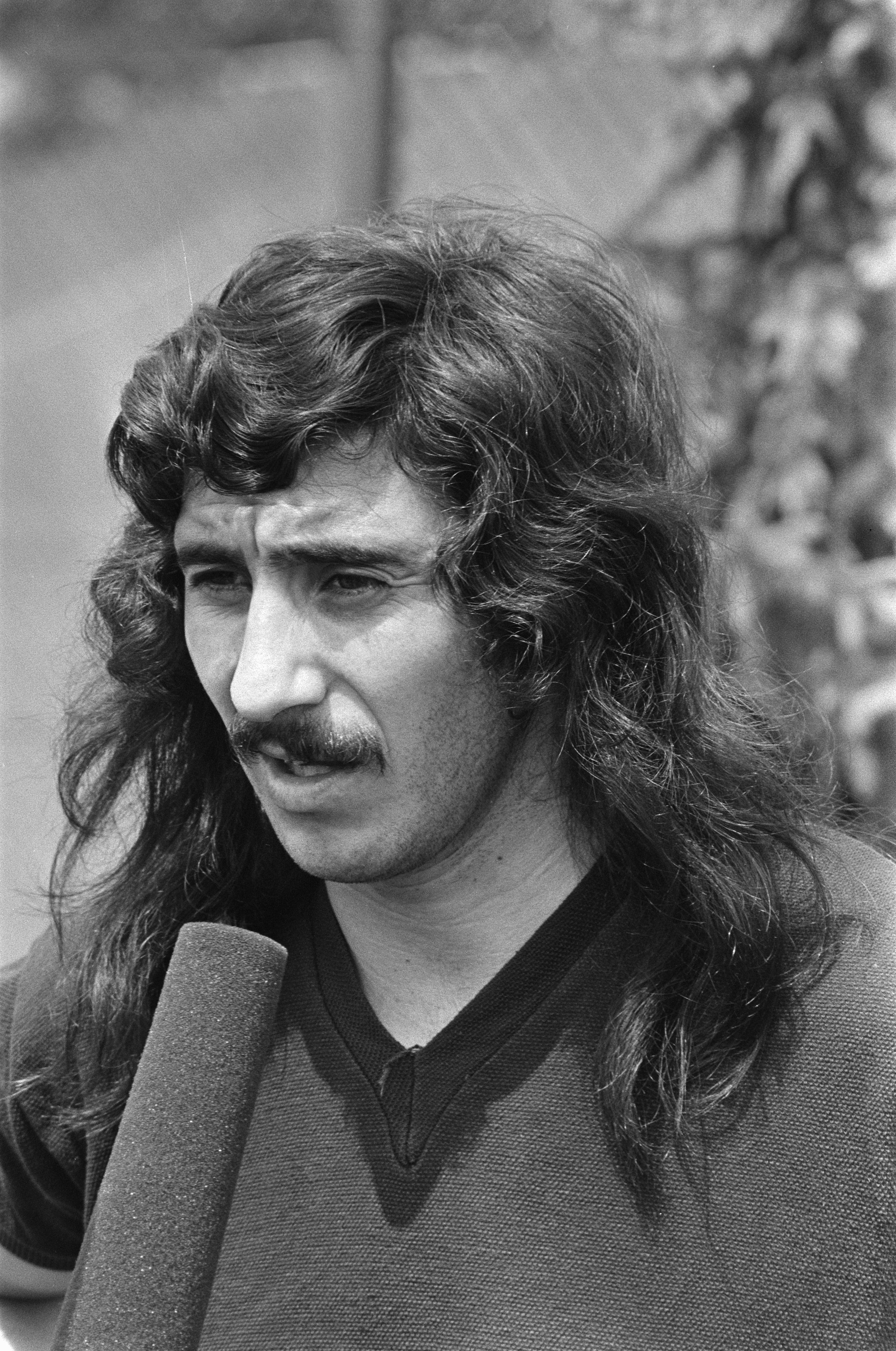
- Ayala in 1974.

Personal information
- Full name: Rubén Hugo Ayala Sanabria
- Date of birth: 8 January 1950 (age 76)
- Place of birth: Humboldt, Santa Fe, Argentina
- Position: Forward

Senior career*
Years	Team	Apps	(Gls)
1968–1973	San Lorenzo	123	(47)
1973–1979	Atlético Madrid	169	(45)
1979–1980	Jalisco	29	(16)
1980–1984	Atlante	135	(29)
Total		456	(137)

International career
1969–1974	Argentina	25	(11)

Managerial career
- 1986–1987: Cobras de Ciudad Juárez
- 1987–1988: Tampico Madero
- 1988–1989: Cobras de Ciudad Juárez
- 1992–1994: Correcaminos UAT
- 2000–2003: Pachuca (Assistant)
- 2005: Pachuca (interim)
- 2007–2008: Pachuca Reserves and Academy
- 2008–2010: Universidad del Fútbol
- 2010–2011: Pachuca Reserves and Academy
- 2011–2012: Titanes Tulancingo
- 2012: Murciélagos
- 2013–2019: León Reserves and Academy
- 2017: León (Interim)
- * Club domestic league appearances and goals as of May 2007

Rubén Hugo Ayala Sanabria (born 8 January 1950 in Santa Fe, Argentina) is a former Argentine football player and manager, who played as a forward.

== Playing career ==
Born in Humboldt, Las Colonias Department, Santa Fe Province, Ayala played club football for Club Atlético San Lorenzo de Almagro in Argentina where he was part of the team that famously went unbeaten for the whole of the 1972 Nacional championship.

In 1973, he left for Atlético Madrid in Spain, where he won several titles. In the 1974 Intercontinental Cup, Atlético overturned a 1–0 first-leg defeat against Independiente when Ayala scored the second goal in a 2–0 victory at the Vicente Calderón Stadium on 10 April 1975, securing the trophy 2–1 on aggregate. In 1979, he moved to Mexico to play for Club Jalisco and Atlante F.C.

In 1979, he moved to Mexico to play for Club Jalisco and Atlante F.C.

During his playing career he earned 25 caps and scored 11 goals for the Argentina national football team, and played in the 1974 FIFA World Cup (scoring against Haiti).

He was nicknamed Ratón (Mouse) due to his short height.

== Managerial career ==
After retiring as a player Ayala took up coaching in Mexico he has been manager of Cobras de Querétaro (1986–1987), Tampico-Madero (1987–1988), Cobras de Ciudad Juárez (1988–1989), Correcaminos (1992–1994) and C.F. Pachuca (2000–2005). During his time with Pachuca he guided them to two league titles the Invierno 2001 and the Apertura 2003 as an assistant coach.

== Honours ==
=== Player ===
San Lorenzo

- Primera Division Argentina: 1972 Metropolitano, 1972 Nacional
- Copa Argentina Final Canceled: 1970

Atlético de Madrid

- European Cup Runner-up: 1973-74
- Copa Intercontinental: 1974
- Copa del Rey: 1975-76
- La Liga: 1976-77

Atlante F.C.

- CONCACAF Champions Cup: 1983
- Primera División Runner-up: 1981-82

=== Manager ===
Pachuca

- Primera División A/Liga de Ascenso: 1995-96
- Liga MX: Invierno 2001, Apertura 2003

Individual

- Copa Argentina Top Scorer: 1970 (5 goals)
