= 1974 Intercontinental Cup =

Independiente	Atlético Madrid
(Argentina)	(Spain)
1	2
- on aggregate

First leg
Independiente	Atlético Madrid
1	0
- Date: 12 March 1975
- Venue: Independiente Stadium, Avellaneda
- Referee: Charles Corver (Netherlands)
- Attendance: 60,000

Second leg
Atlético Madrid	Independiente
2	0
- Date: 10 April 1975
- Venue: Vicente Calderón, Madrid
- Referee: Carlos Robles (Chile)
- Attendance: 65,000

The 1974 Intercontinental Cup was an association football tie held over two legs in March and April 1975 between Independiente, winners of the 1974 Copa Libertadores, and the runners up of the 1973–74 European Cup, Atlético Madrid, as the winners Bayern Munich declined to participate.

The first leg was held on 12 March 1975 at the Independiente Stadium, then known as La Doble Visera. The match finished up as a 1–0 victory for the local team, with a goal scored by Agustín Balbuena in the 34th minute.

Vicente Calderón Stadium hosted the return leg on 10 April 1975. Atlético Madrid won the second leg 2–0. The goals came from Javier Irureta in the 23rd and Rubén Ayala in the 85th minute. Atlético Madrid won 2–1 on aggregate, and became the only team to win the Intercontinental Cup without winning a continental championship.

== Match details ==
=== First leg ===
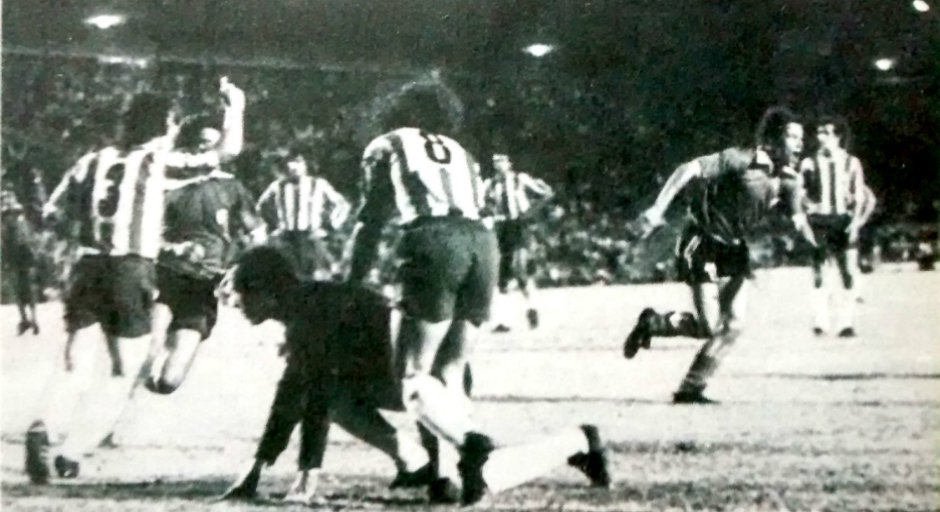
Balbuena celebrating his goal in Avellaneda

12 March 1975

Independiente (Argentina)	1–0	(Spain) Atlético Madrid
Balbuena 34'	Report

Independiente Stadium, Avellaneda
Attendance: 60,000
Referee: Charles Corver (Netherlands)

Independiente	Atlético Madrid

GK	1	(Argentina) José A. Pérez
DF	4	(Argentina) Eduardo Commisso
DF	2	(Argentina) Miguel Ángel López
MF	6	(Argentina) Francisco Sá (c)
DF	3	(Uruguay) Ricardo Pavoni
MF	8	(Argentina) Aldo Rodríguez	(substituted off) 57'
MF	5	(Argentina) Rubén Galván
MF	10	(Argentina) Ricardo Bochini
FW	7	(Argentina) Agustín Balbuena
FW	9	(Peru) Percy Rojas
FW	11	(Argentina) Daniel Bertoni	(substituted off) 83'
Substitutes:
DF		(Argentina) Alejandro Semenewicz	(substituted on) 57'
FW		(Argentina) Luis Giribet	(substituted on) 83'
Manager:
(Argentina) Roberto Ferreiro

GK	1	(Spain) Miguel Reina
DF	2	(Spain) Francisco Melo (c)
DF	3	(Argentina) Ramón Heredia
DF	4	(Paraguay) Domingo Benegas
DF	5	(Spain) José Luis Capón
MF	6	(Spain) Eusebio Bejarano
MF	7	(Spain) Alberto Fernández (substituted off) 46'
MF	8	(Spain) Adelardo
FW	9	(Spain) Javier Irureta
FW	10	(Spain) José Eulogio Gárate
FW	11	(Argentina) Rubén Ayala
Substitutes:
MF		(Spain) Heraldo Bezerra	(substituted on) 46'
Manager:
(Spain) Luis Aragonés

=== Second leg ===
10 April 1975

Atlético Madrid (Spain)	2–0	(Argentina) Independiente
Irureta 34'; Ayala 85'	Report

Vicente Calderón, Madrid
Attendance: 65,000
Referee: Carlos Robles (Chile)

Atlético Madrid	Independiente

GK	1	(Spain) José Pacheco
DF	2	(Spain) Francisco Melo
DF	3	(Argentina) Ramón Heredia
DF	4	(Spain) Francisco Aguilar (c)
DF	5	(Spain) José Luis Capón
MF	6	(Spain) Eusebio Bejarano
MF	7	(Spain) Alberto Fernández (substituted off) 27'
MF	8	(Spain) Adelardo
FW	9	(Spain) Javier Irureta
FW	10	(Spain) José Eulogio Gárate
FW	11	(Argentina) Rubén Ayala
Substitutes:
MF		(Spain) Ignacio Salcedo	(substituted on) 27'
Manager:
(Spain) Luis Aragonés

GK	1	(Argentina) José A. Pérez
DF	4	(Argentina) Eduardo Commisso (c)
DF	2	(Argentina) Miguel Ángel López
MF	6	(Argentina) Osvaldo Carrica
DF	3	(Uruguay) Ricardo Pavoni
MF	8	(Argentina) Hugo Saggiorato
MF	5	(Argentina) Rubén Galván
MF	10	(Argentina) Ricardo Bochini
FW	7	(Argentina) Agustín Balbuena
FW	9	(Peru) Percy Rojas	(substituted off) 62'
FW	11	(Argentina) Daniel Bertoni
Substitutes:
DF		(Argentina) Aldo Rodríguez	(substituted on) 62'
Manager:
(Argentina) Roberto Ferreiro

== See also ==
- 1973–74 European Cup
- 1974 Copa Libertadores
- Atlético Madrid in European football
