= Miguel Reina =

Spanish footballer (born 1946)

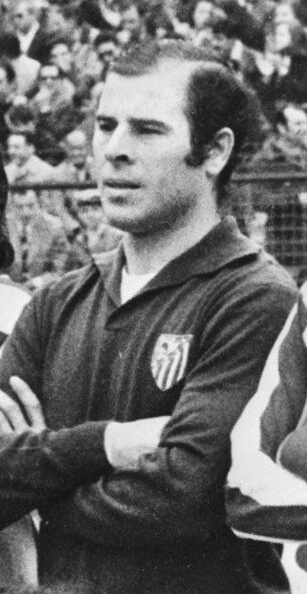
- Reina with Atlético Madrid

Personal information
- Full name: Miguel Reina Santos
- Date of birth: 21 January 1946 (age 80)
- Place of birth: Córdoba, Spain
- Height: 1.80 m (5 ft 11 in)
- Position: Goalkeeper

Youth career
- Candelaria
- Santiago
- Córdoba

Senior career*
Years	Team	Apps	(Gls)
1964–1966	Córdoba	46	(0)
1966–1973	Barcelona	111	(0)
1973–1980	Atlético Madrid	155	(0)
Total		312	(0)

International career
1964	Spain U18	2	(0)
1967	Spain U23	2	(0)
1965	Spain amateur	2	(0)
1969–1973	Spain	5	(0)
- * Club domestic league appearances and goals

Miguel Reina Santos (born 21 January 1946) is a Spanish former footballer who played as a goalkeeper.

He played 312 La Liga matches over 16 seasons, mainly in representation of Barcelona and Atlético Madrid (seven years apiece), winning six major titles.

== Club career ==
Born in Córdoba, Andalusia, Reina finished his development with local Córdoba CF. He made his La Liga debut on 11 October 1964 in a 2–0 home win against Elche CF, aged only 18, and finished his first season with 26 appearances as his team ranked in fifth position.

Reina joined FC Barcelona in the 1966 off-season, totalling only four league games in his first three years as he acted as understudy to both José Manuel Pesudo and Salvador Sadurní. From 1969–70 onwards he became the starter, going on to win his second Copa del Rey with the Catalans – the first as an active member – and adding the Ricardo Zamora Trophy for the 1972–73 campaign (all 34 matches played for the runners-up and only 21 goals conceded, posting a record of 824 minutes without a goal which would last until 1 November 2011 when he was surpassed by Víctor Valdés).

Aged 27, Reina left Barça and signed for Atlético Madrid, rarely missing a game in his first five seasons and winning the 1977 national championship, his only in the competition. He also reached the final of the 1974 European Cup against FC Bayern Munich at the Heysel Stadium in Belgium: after 90 minutes the match was tied 0–0 and, in the 114th minute, Luis Aragonés scored for the Colchoneros, but Reina let in a long-range shot with just seconds to go and the Spaniards went on to lose the replay 4–0.

From 1978 to 1980, Reina only managed to be third choice at Atlético, and retired at the age of 34 with 424 competitive matches to his credit. He held the record for the fastest goalkeeper to achieve 100 clean sheets in La Liga history – a feat which he accomplished in 222 appearances – until it was broken by Jan Oblak in 2020, who achieved the milestone in only 182.

== International career ==
Reina earned five caps for Spain, in a period of three and a half years. His debut came on 15 October 1969 in a 6–0 win against Finland for the 1970 FIFA World Cup qualifiers, played at La Línea de la Concepción.

Previously, Reina was selected by manager José Villalonga for his 1966 World Cup squad in England, remaining on the bench for the entire tournament.

== Personal life ==
Reina's son, Pepe, was also a goalkeeper. He too played for Barcelona and Spain, also representing Liverpool for several years.

In the 1970–71 season, Reina was only played by English coach Vic Buckingham away from the Camp Nou as the player was consistently booed by his own fans after a poor performance against FC Dynamo Moscow.

Reina was elected to his hometown's council in 2011, for the People's Party. He supported prison for the leaders of the Catalan independence movement.

== Honours ==
Barcelona

- Copa del Generalísimo: 1967–68, 1970–71
- Inter-Cities Fairs Cup: 1971

Atlético Madrid

- La Liga: 1976–77
- Copa del Generalísimo: 1975–76
- Intercontinental Cup: 1974
- European Cup runner-up: 1973–74

Spain U18

- UEFA European Under-18 Championship runner-up: 1964

Individual

- Ricardo Zamora Trophy: 1972–73, 1976–77
