= 1970 Copa Argentina =

Copa Argentina
- Season: 1970
- Champions: (None)
- Biggest home win: Platense 5–1 Argentinos Juniors
- Biggest away win: Mitre 0–4 Chacarita Juniors
- Highest scoring: Colón Juniors 2–4 Lanús

The 1970 Copa Argentina was the second edition of Copa Argentina, being held from March 1970 to March 1971. The tournament was played as a knockout competition, with the participation of 32 teams; 18 of the Primera División, 1 of the Primera B, 13 of the regional leagues.

== Teams ==
=== Primera División ===
- Argentinos Juniors
- Atlanta
- Banfield
- Chacarita Juniors
- Colón
- Gimnasia y Esgrima (LP)
- Huracán
- Independiente
- Lanús
- Los Andes
- Newell's Old Boys
- Platense
- Quilmes
- Racing
- Rosario Central
- San Lorenzo
- Unión
- Vélez Sársfield

=== Primera B ===
- Ferro Carril Oeste

=== Regional leagues ===
- All Boys (Santa Rosa)
- Atenas (Santo Tomé)
- Argentinos del Norte (Tucumán)
- Atlético Palmira (Mendoza)
- Bartolomé Mitre (Posadas)
- Central Norte
- Central Norte Argentino (Resistencia)
- Colón Juniors (San Juan)
- Instituto (C)
- Juventud Unida Universitario
- Mitre (SdE)
- Rosario Puerto Belgrano (Punta Alta)
- Quilmes (MdP)

== Round of 32 ==
Team 1	Agg.	Team 2	1st leg	2nd leg
All Boys (SR)	4–3	Gimnasia y Esgrima (LP)	3–1	1–2
Argentinos del Norte	2–2 (3–4)p	Vélez Sársfield	1–0	1–2
Bartolomé Mitre	2–3	Ferro Carril Oeste	1–2	1–1
Central Norte	1–7	Chacarita Juniors	0–3	1–4
Central Norte Argentino	3–4	Racing	0–1	3–3
Colón	6–2	Atenas (ST)	3–2	3–0
Colón Juniors	4–7	Lanús	2–3	2–4
Juventud Unida Universitario	0–2	Atlanta	0–0	0–2
Palmira	5–3	Independiente	3–1	2–2
Quilmes (MdP)	1–4	Argentinos Juniors	0–2	1–2
Rosario Central	5–3	Huracán	4–2	1–1
Rosario Puerto Belgrano	3–4	Platense	3–2	0–2
Instituto	4–1	Quilmes	0–0	4–1
Los Andes	0–0 (2–4)p	Newell's Old Boys	0–0	0–0
Unión	2–3	San Lorenzo	2–2	0–1

== Round of 16 ==
Round of 16
All Boys (SR)	0	1	1 (4)
Atlanta	1	0	1 (2)
Argentinos Juniors	1	1	2
Platense	1	5	6
Rosario Central	1	0	1
Newell's Old Boys	0	0	0
Colón	0	1	1
San Lorenzo	0	4	4
Palmira	2	1	3 (3)
Lanús	1	2	3 (4)
Racing	2	3	5
Ferro Carril Oeste	1	1	2
Mitre (SdE)	0	1	1
Chacarita Juniors	4	0	4
Instituto	0	0	0
Vélez Sársfield	0	2	2

Quarterfinals
All Boys (SR)	2	0	2
Platense	0	0	0
Rosario Central	2	0	2
San Lorenzo	1	3	4
Lanús	0	0	0
Racing	1	3	4
Chacarita Juniors	0	1	1
Vélez Sársfield	1	2	3

Semifinals
All Boys (SR)	1	1	2
San Lorenzo	1	3	4
Racing	2	2	4
Vélez Sársfield	3	3	6

Champion & Runner-Up
San Lorenzo	2	-	2
Vélez Sársfield	2	-	2

== Final ==
March 3, 1971

San Lorenzo	2–2	Vélez Sársfield
Rubén Ayala 1'; Gónzalez 6'		Benitto 50'; Mecca 52'

Don León Kolbovski, Buenos Aires
Referee: Juan Álvarez

August 7, 2024

Vélez Sársfield	-	San Lorenzo

Libertadores de América, Avellaneda
Referee: -

The Second leg was never played so the tournament was unfinished.
