= Francisco Aguilar (footballer, born 1952) =

Spanish footballer

Personal information
- Full name: Francisco Aguilar Fernández
- Date of birth: 10 May 1952 (age 74)
- Place of birth: Córdoba, Spain
- Height: 1.70 m (5 ft 7 in)
- Position: Forward

Youth career
- Elche

Senior career*
Years	Team	Apps	(Gls)
1972–1974	Elche	7	(0)
1974–1975	Rayo Vallecano	25	(6)
1975–1980	Atlético Madrid	77	(16)
1980–1981	Granada	19	(5)
Total		128	(27)

International career
1975	Spain amateur	1	(0)
- * Club domestic league appearances and goals

Francisco Aguilar Fernández (born 10 May 1952) is a Spanish retired footballer who played as a forward.

== Football career ==
Aguilar was born in Córdoba, Andalusia. After playing with Elche CF and Rayo Vallecano, competing with the former in La Liga in 1973–74, he joined Atlético Madrid in March 1975, going on remain with the club a further five full seasons in the top flight.

With the Colchoneros Aguilar was mainly a reserve, but contributed with 18 games and two goals as the club won the 1977 national championship. He also appeared the full 90 minutes in the second match of the 1974 Intercontinental Cup against Club Atlético Independiente, helping the hosts win it 2–0 and overcome the 0–1 first-leg deficit to conquer the tournament.

Aguilar retired from the professional football at the end of the 1980–81 campaign, suffering Segunda División relegation with Granada CF.

== Honours ==
Atlético Madrid

- Intercontinental Cup: 1974
- La Liga: 1976–77
- Copa del Rey: 1975–76
