= Lennart Larsson (footballer) =

Swedish footballer

Personal information
- Date of birth: 9 July 1953 (age 73)
- Place of birth: Stockholm, Sweden
- Height: 1.83 m (6 ft 0 in)
- Position: Midfielder

Senior career*
Years	Team	Apps	(Gls)
1970–1972	IFK Malmö		
1973–1975	Hässleholms IF		
1976–1977	Halmstads BK	51	(16)
1977–1979	Schalke 04	26	(3)
1979–1982	Halmstads BK	53	(10)

International career
1976–1981	Sweden	26	(4)
- * Club domestic league appearances and goals

Lennart Larsson (born 9 July 1953) is a Swedish former professional footballer who played as a midfielder.

== Career ==
Born in Stockholm, Larsson began his career in Hässleholms IF in 1976 when he went to play with Halmstads BK and won Allsvenskan the same year. In 1977, he was sold to FC Schalke 04 in the Bundesliga. He played two seasons there as a midfielder and went back to Halmstad in 1979–82 for a second time and became Swedish champion again in 1979, the club's second title.

Larsson was capped 26 times for the Sweden national team between 1976 and 1981 and was a part of the squad in the 1978 FIFA World Cup.
