= Aldo Poy =

Argentine footballer and politician

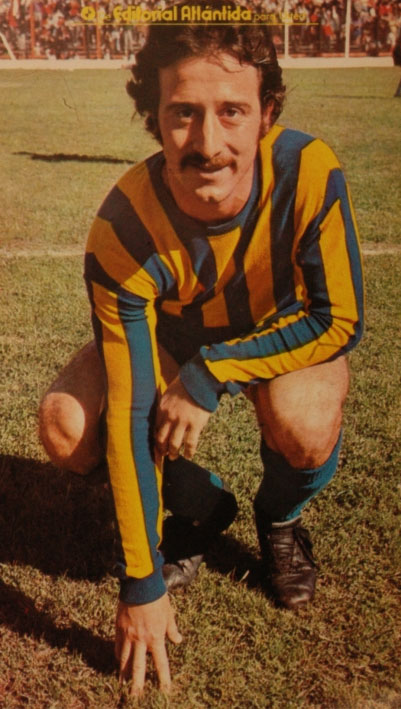
- Poy in 1970.

Personal information
- Full name: Aldo Pedro Poy
- Date of birth: 14 September 1945 (age 81)
- Place of birth: Rosario, Santa Fe, Argentina
- Position: Forward

Youth career
- 1962–1965: Rosario Central

Senior career*
Years	Team	Apps	(Gls)
1965–1974	Rosario Central	292	(61)

International career
1973–1974	Argentina	2	(0)
- * Club domestic league appearances and goals as of 19 December 2012

Aldo Pedro Poy (Rosario, Santa Fe, Argentina, 14 September 1945) is a retired football player and current politician. He spent his entire career at Rosario Central, playing as forward. Poy debuted on 3 October 1965 against Huracán, playing his last match as professional on 30 December 1974 against Newell's Old Boys.

Poy is considered one of the most representative players of Rosario Central, having also played for the Argentina national football team in the 1974 FIFA World Cup. His son Mauro is also a footballer. Poy is currently a city councillor in his home town, representing the Partido Demócrata Progresista.

== Playing career ==
During his beginning as a footballer, Poy was strongly questioned by Central's supporters so he was about to leave the club in 1969 when Club Atlético Los Andes (that played in Primera División by then) was interested in hiring him. It is said that Poy hid in the islands near to Paraná river to avoid being found and transferred to Los Andes. The legend says that Poy was hidden during a week until he returned to Rosario where he rejected the offer to play at Los Andes.

In 1971 Poy won the Primera División championship with Rosario Central. During the semifinals against Newell's Old Boys, Poy scored his famous "palomita" goal, heading the ball with his body in horizontal position, without touching the grass. This goal against the arch-rival became legendary and is still remembered by all the Rosario Central fans. Two years later Poy won his second title with Central, the 1973 Torneo Nacional, in a final round played with River Plate, San Lorenzo and Atlanta.

In December 1974 Central played the qualifiers for Copa Libertadores against Newell's. Poy disputed the ball with Mario Zanabria, being injured in his left knee. He went to surgery to be operated on his leg. After the recovery Poy returned to play football again, but he had to be operated again so he decided to end his professional career.

Poy totalized 292 matches in Primera División tournaments, scoring 61 goals. He also played 16 games in the Copa Libertadores with 3 goals scored, always playing with Rosario Central. Poy played 25 Rosarino derby against Newell's, winning 10, with 4 losses and 11 ties. Newell's was the team Poy scored the most goals (6), followed by Boca Juniors with 5 goals.

=== The diving header ===
On 19 December 1971, Rosario Central played the semifinals of Nacional championship against arch-rival Newell's Old Boys in the Estadio Monumental. Central won by 1–0 with the most famous goal scored by Poy, the Palomita (diving head). This result qualified Central to play the finals, where the team would win the first championship in its history.

This goal became legendary, being still remembered by all the Central fans who every 19 December join to commemorate that goal and then championship. In the meeting, the gameplay is recreated exactly as it was, being Poy himself who scores the goal as if he still plays for Central while the fans celebrate the goal. Besides, a group of Central's fans tried to register the diving head goal at the Guinness World Records as "the most celebrated goal in the history of football", although this has not happened yet.

The meeting has changed its place several times, moving to different regions of Argentina and even outside the country. In 1997 the goal was recreated in Cuba, where Ernesto Guevara (the youngest son of Che Guevara, a famous fan of Rosario Central) played the role of Poy scoring the goal as in 1971. The celebration has also been carried out to United States (in 2000 and 2013), Chile (2002) and Uruguay (2008).

== After football ==
In 2011 Poy was elected as councillor representing Frente Progresista, Cívico y Social of Rosario.

== Honours ==
=== Club ===
Rosario Central

- Primera Division Argentina: 1971 Nacional, 1973 Nacional

== Literature ==
Famous Argentine writer Roberto Fontanarrosa wrote a short story called 19 de Diciembre de 1971 (the date of the match), included in the book Área 18 from the same writer. The story is about a man -the Old Casale- who had never seen Rosario Central to lose a match against Newell's Old Boys. Before the decisive semi-final game, a group of friends of Casale's son invited him to watch the game in the stadium. The boys thought that Casale would bring good luck to the team so he had never seen a defeat at the hands of Newell's.

But Casale refused to go to the stadium with the boys, alleging that he had a heart disease since two years ago and want to avoid strong emotions. As Casale persisted in not to go, the friends decided to kidnap Casale to take him to the Estadio Monumental. The plan is carried out successfully and the story ends with Casale dying of a heart attack due to the emotion that the victory caused on him.
