= Heraldo Bezerra =

Brazilian-born Spanish footballer (1945-1977)

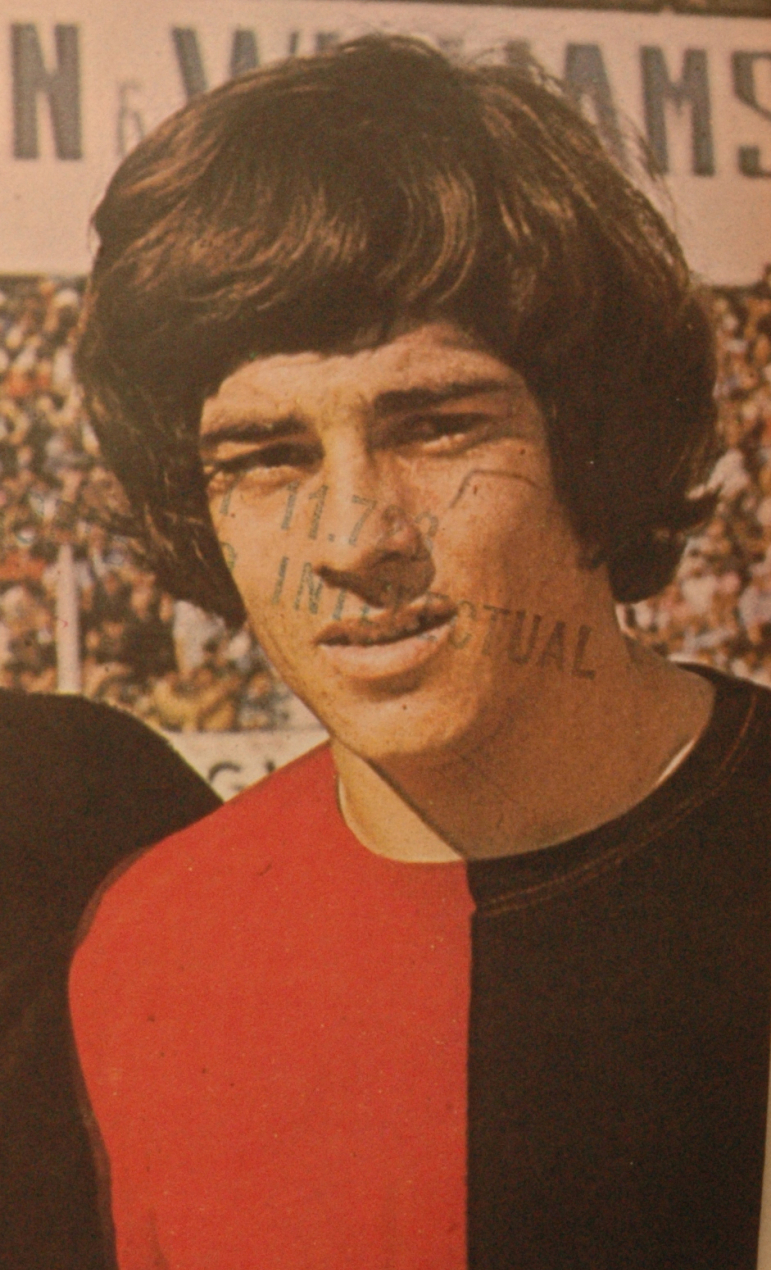
- Heraldo Bezerra in 1970.

Personal information
- Full name: Heraldo Bezerra Nuñez
- Date of birth: 21 April 1945
- Place of birth: São Jerônimo, Brazil
- Date of death: 14 March 1977 (aged 31)
- Place of death: Campana, Argentina
- Height: 1.80 m (5 ft 11 in)
- Position: Striker

Senior career*
| Years | Team | Apps | (Gls) |
| ?–1967 | Cruzeiro | - | (-) |
| 1968–1971 | Newell's Old Boys | 124 | (32) |
| 1971–1977 | Atlético Madrid | 99 | (16) |
| 1977 | Boca Juniors | 2 | (0) |

International career^{‡}
| 1973 | Spain | 1 | (0) |
- * Club domestic league appearances and goals as of 01:17, 26 November 2007 (UTC) ‡ National team caps and goals as of 01:17, 26 November 2007 (UTC)

Heraldo Bezerra Nuñez (21 April 1945 – 14 March 1977) was a Spanish footballer who played for Cruzeiro.

Despite being born in São Jerônimo, Brazil, Bezerra was a Spanish citizen and played at the international level with Spain. He played against Turkey, in a 0–0 tie in 1973. He played together with Ayala and Garate in a famous forward line known as the three daggers. He played 102 games in La Liga, scoring 16 goals. Shortly after being transferred from Atlético Madrid to Boca Juniors at the beginning of the Argentine season, Bezerra died in a car accident near Campana on 14 March 1977, while travelling to Rosario accompanying teammate Ruben Favret, who survived without injuries.

== Titles ==
=== National competitions ===
- 2 Spanish First Division titles (Atlético: 1972–1973, and 1976–1977)
- 2 Copa del Rey titles (Atlético in 1972 and 1976)

=== International competitions ===
- 1 Torneo Sudamericano 1970 Oficial de AUF

Asociación Uruguaya de Fútbol

- 1 Intercontinental Cup (Atlético Madrid in 1974)

== See also ==
- List of Spain international footballers born outside Spain
