= 1976–77 La Liga =

46th season of La Liga

Primera División
- Season: 1976–77
- Champions: Atlético Madrid (8th title)
- Relegated: Zaragoza; Celta Vigo; Málaga
- European Cup: Atlético Madrid
- UEFA Cup Winners' Cup: Real Betis
- UEFA Cup: Barcelona; Athletic Bilbao; Las Palmas
- Matches: 306
- Goals: 829 (2.71 per match)
- Top goalscorer: Mario Kempes (24 goals)

The 1976–77 La Liga was the 46th season since its establishment. It began on 4 September 1976, and concluded on 22 May 1977.

== Team locations ==
Location of teams in La Liga 1976–77
Canary Islands

Team	Home city	Stadium
Athletic Bilbao	Bilbao	San Mamés
Atlético Madrid	Madrid	Vicente Calderón
Barcelona	Barcelona	Nou Camp
Burgos	Burgos	El Plantío
Celta	Vigo	Balaídos
Elche	Elche	Altabix
Español	Barcelona	Sarriá
Hércules	Alicante	José Rico Pérez
Las Palmas	Las Palmas	Insular
Málaga	Málaga	La Rosaleda
Racing Santander	Santander	El Sardinero
Real Betis	Seville	Benito Villamarín
Real Madrid	Madrid	Santiago Bernabéu
Real Sociedad	San Sebastián	Atocha
Salamanca	Villares de la Reina	Helmántico
Sevilla	Seville	Ramón Sánchez Pizjuán
Valencia	Valencia	Luis Casanova
Zaragoza	Zaragoza	La Romareda

== League table ==
Pos	Team	Pld	W	D	L	GF	GA	GD	Pts	Qualification or relegation
1	Atlético Madrid (C)	34	19	8	7	62	33	+29	46	Qualification for the European Cup first round
2	Barcelona	34	18	9	7	69	34	+35	45	Qualification for the UEFA Cup first round
3	Athletic Bilbao	34	15	8	11	55	45	+10	38	Qualification for the UEFA Cup first round
4	Las Palmas	34	15	6	13	56	51	+5	36	Qualification for the UEFA Cup first round
5	Real Betis	34	15	6	13	42	42	0	36	Qualification for the Cup Winners' Cup first round (Note: Real Betis qualified to the Cup Winners' Cup as winners of the Copa del Rey.)
6	Español	34	14	8	12	61	59	+2	36	
7	Valencia	34	13	10	11	53	47	+6	36	
8	Real Sociedad	34	13	8	13	54	41	+13	34	
9	Real Madrid	34	12	10	12	57	53	+4	34	
10	Sevilla	34	11	12	11	32	39	−7	34	
11	Elche	34	11	11	12	45	47	−2	33	
12	Salamanca	34	13	6	15	30	34	−4	32	
13	Hércules	34	11	10	13	35	41	−6	32	
14	Burgos	34	14	4	16	46	50	−4	32	
15	Racing Santander	34	12	7	15	41	62	−21	31	
16	Zaragoza (R)	34	10	10	14	42	51	−9	30	Relegation to the Segunda División
17	Celta Vigo (R)	34	9	11	14	22	40	−18	29	Relegation to the Segunda División
18	Málaga (R)	34	6	6	22	27	60	−33	18	Relegation to the Segunda División

Source: BDFútbol
Rules for classification: 1) Points; 2) Head-to-head results; 3) Goal difference; 4) Number of goals scored
(C) Champions; (R) Relegated

== Results table ==
Home \ Away	ATH	ATM	BAR	BET	BUR	CEL	ELC	ESP	HÉR	LPA	MLG	RAC	RMA	RSO	SAL	SEV	VAL	ZAR
Athletic Bilbao		0–1	1–3	1–0	3–0	2–2	1–1	5–2	3–0	2–1	1–1	1–0	4–1	4–2	2–0	4–0	2–1	3–1
Atlético Madrid	2–1		3–1	3–1	0–3	3–0	5–1	1–1	1–0	1–0	2–0	5–1	4–0	5–1	2–1	3–3	2–3	2–0
FC Barcelona	0–2	1–1		3–1	3–0	4–0	4–1	4–2	1–1	4–0	2–1	7–0	3–1	2–1	4–1	3–3	6–1	2–1
Betis	2–1	1–0	1–3		2–1	1–0	1–0	5–1	1–0	2–2	0–1	2–1	2–0	2–1	2–1	0–1	0–0	2–1
Burgos	2–2	2–0	1–0	2–1		1–0	3–1	1–2	1–1	4–1	3–0	1–1	3–2	2–0	0–2	1–0	4–1	2–0
Celta de Vigo	0–0	1–0	0–0	0–0	2–1		1–1	1–0	2–2	1–0	2–1	2–0	2–0	1–0	0–1	0–0	1–0	0–0
Elche CF	2–1	0–1	0–0	2–0	0–0	1–1		4–1	2–1	2–2	3–0	4–1	1–1	2–0	1–0	3–0	1–4	2–0
RCD Español	4–0	1–4	2–3	1–1	2–1	2–0	2–0		3–0	2–0	5–1	2–1	4–1	1–0	4–0	0–0	3–0	2–0
Hércules CF	0–0	2–1	2–2	1–0	3–0	2–1	1–1	2–0		2–1	1–0	2–0	0–1	2–0	4–2	0–0	2–1	1–1
UD Las Palmas	2–1	1–1	2–1	1–1	4–1	5–1	0–0	5–0	1–0		2–1	4–1	4–2	2–0	2–0	4–2	2–1	1–4
CD Málaga	0–3	0–0	1–0	0–1	1–2	1–1	2–3	1–1	1–1	0–2		1–2	2–1	2–1	1–0	0–0	0–1	2–1
Racing de Santander	1–1	0–0	1–0	4–3	1–0	1–0	2–1	2–2	1–1	2–1	3–2		3–3	2–1	0–1	2–0	2–2	1–0
Real Madrid	2–3	1–1	1–1	0–1	1–0	0–0	5–2	4–1	4–0	3–0	4–1	3–1		2–2	0–1	0–0	2–0	4–2
Real Sociedad	5–0	2–0	0–0	3–0	4–1	4–0	0–0	3–3	3–0	4–0	1–0	3–1	1–1		1–0	2–1	2–2	2–0
UD Salamanca	3–0	1–1	2–0	0–1	3–1	2–0	1–0	2–1	1–0	0–0	3–0	0–1	0–1	1–1		1–0	0–0	0–0
Sevilla FC	1–0	1–2	0–1	3–2	2–0	2–0	0–0	0–0	1–0	2–1	2–1	1–0	1–1	0–3	2–0		0–0	4–1
Valencia CF	2–0	2–3	0–1	2–2	3–1	2–0	1–0	4–1	3–1	1–2	3–1	4–2	1–1	1–0	0–0	4–0		1–1
Zaragoza	1–1	0–2	0–0	2–1	2–1	1–0	5–3	3–3	1–0	2–1	3–1	2–0	2–4	1–1	2–0	0–0	2–2	

Source: kicker.de
Legend: Blue = home team win; Yellow = draw; Red = away team win.

== Pichichi Trophy ==
Rank	Player	Club	Goals
1	(Argentina) Mario Kempes	Valencia	24
2	(Spain) Manuel Clares	Barcelona	22
2	(Spain) Marañón	Español	22
2	(Argentina) Carlos Morete	Las Palmas	22
5	(Spain) Rubén Cano	Atlético Madrid	20
6	(Spain) Jesús María Satrústegui	Real Sociedad	19
7	(Spain) Dani	Athletic Bilbao	16
7	(Paraguay) Diarte	Valencia	16
7	(Argentina) Mario Finarolli	Elche	16
