= 1966 Inter-Cities Fairs Cup final =

- Event: 1965–66 Inter-Cities Fairs Cup
Barcelona	Zaragoza
(Spain)	(Spain)
4	3
- on aggregate

First leg
Barcelona	Zaragoza
0	1
- Date: 14 September 1966
- Venue: Camp Nou, Barcelona
- Referee: István Zsolt (Hungary)
- Attendance: 50,000

Second leg
Zaragoza	Barcelona
2	4
- Date: 21 September 1966
- Venue: La Romareda, Zaragoza
- Referee: Concetto Lo Bello (Italy)
- Attendance: 33,000

The 1966 Inter-Cities Fairs Cup final was the final of the eighth Inter-Cities Fairs Cup. It was played on 14 September and 21 September 1966 between Barcelona and Zaragoza of Spain. Barcelona won the tie 4–3 on aggregate.

== Route to the final ==
Barcelona					Round	Zaragoza				
Opponent	Agg.	1st leg	2nd leg	Replay (if necessary)		Opponent	Agg.	1st leg	2nd leg	Replay (if necessary)
(Netherlands) VV DOS	7–1	0–0 (A)	7–1 (H)		First round	Bye				
(Belgium) Royal Antwerp	3–2	1–2 (A)	2–0 (H)		Second round	(Republic of Ireland) Shamrock Rovers	3–2	1–1 (A)	2–1 (H)	
(West Germany) Hannover 96	2–2	1–2 (A)	1–0 (H)	1–1 (a.e.t., c) (A)	Third round	(Scotland) Heart of Midlothian	5–5	3–3 (A)	2–2 (H)	1–0 (H)
(Spain) Español (Note: The Barcelona-based club had formerly been known as Reial Club Deportivo Espanyol, with the Catalan spelling reflecting its Catalonian roots. However, after the Spanish Civil War, they were forced to change their name to RCD Español (the Spanish spelling), due to Francisco Franco–– a Spanish nationalist–– ordering the abolishment of the Catalan language in Spain. This spelling of the team's name would last until 1995, when the club reverted to the original Catalan spelling; today the club is once again named RCD Espanyol.)	2–0	1–0 (H)	1–0 (A)		Quarter-finals	(Scotland) Dunfermline Athletic	4–3	0–1 (A)	4–2 (H)	
(England) Chelsea	2–2	2–0 (H)	0–2 (A)	5–0 (H)	Semi-finals	(England) Leeds United	2–2	1–0 (H)	1–2 (A)	3–1 (A)

== Match details ==
=== First leg ===
14 September 1966
20:45 CEST

Barcelona (Spain)	0–1	(Spain) Zaragoza
		Canário 40'

Camp Nou, Barcelona
Attendance: 50,000
Referee: István Zsolt (Hungary)

Barcelona
Zaragoza

GK	1	(Spain) Salvador Sadurní
DF	2	(Uruguay) Julio César Benítez
DF	5	(Spain) Gallego
DF	3	(Spain) Eladio Silvestre
MF	4	(Spain) Ramón Montesinos
MF	6	(Spain) Antoni Torres
FW	7	(Spain) Pedro Zaballa
FW	8	(France) Lucien Muller
FW	9	(Spain) José Antonio Zaldúa (c)
FW	10	(Spain) Josep Maria Fusté
FW	11	(Spain) Luis Vidal
Manager:
(Argentina) Roque Olsen

GK	1	(Spain) Enrique Yarza (c)
DF	2	(Spain) José Ramón Irusquieta
DF	5	(Spain) Paco Santamaría
DF	3	(Spain) Severino Reija
MF	4	(Spain) Antonio Pais
DF	6	(Spain) José Luis Violeta
FW	7	(Brazil) (Spain) Canário
FW	8	(Spain) Eleuterio Santos
FW	9	(Spain) Marcelino Martínez
FW	10	(Spain) Juan Manuel Villa
FW	11	(Spain) Carlos Lapetra
Manager:
(Czechoslovakia) Ferdinand Daučík

=== Second leg ===
21 September 1966
20:30 CEST

Zaragoza (Spain)	2–4 (a.e.t.)	(Spain) Barcelona
Marcelino 24', 87'		Pujol 3', 85', 120'; Zaballa 70'

La Romareda, Zaragoza
Attendance: 33,000
Referee: Concetto Lo Bello (Italy)

Zaragoza
Barcelona

GK	1	(Spain) Enrique Yarza (c)
DF		(Spain) José Ramón Irusquieta
DF	5	(Spain) Paco Santamaria
DF	3	(Spain) Severino Reija
MF	4	(Spain) Antonio Pais
MF	6	(Spain) José Luis Violeta
FW	7	(Brazil) (Spain) Canário	(red card) 88'
FW	8	(Spain) Eleuterio Santos
FW	9	(Spain) Marcelino Martínez
FW	10	(Spain) Juan Manuel Villa
FW	11	(Spain) Carlos Lapetra
Manager:
(Czechoslovakia) Ferdinand Daučík

GK	1	(Spain) Salvador Sadurní
DF	2	(Spain) Foncho
DF	5	(Spain) Gallego
DF	3	(Spain) Eladio Silvestre
MF	4	(Spain) Ramón Montesinos
MF	6	(Spain) Antoni Torres	(red card) 88'
FW	7	(Spain) Pedro Zaballa
FW	8	(Spain) Pedro Mas
FW	9	(Spain) José Antonio Zaldúa (c)
FW	10	(Spain) Josep Maria Fusté
FW	11	(Spain) Lluís Pujol
Manager:
(Argentina) Roque Olsen

Barcelona win 4–3 on aggregate

== See also ==
- 1965–66 Inter-Cities Fairs Cup
- FC Barcelona in international football competitions
