= List of Real Zaragoza players =

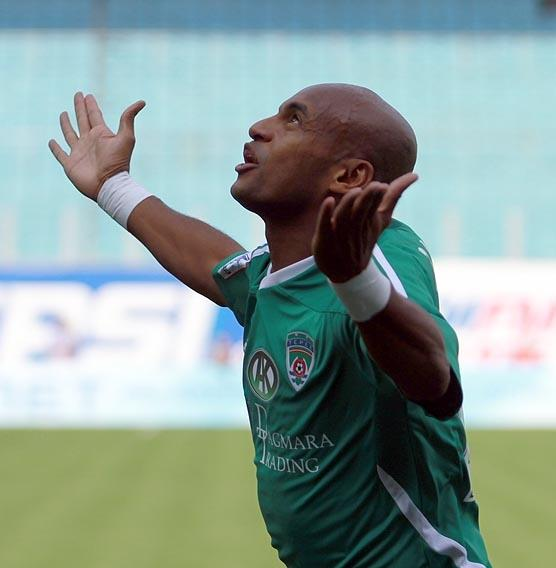
Ewerthon, pictured here scoring for Terek Grozny in Russia in 2011, holds the record for most goals in a single season, netting 28 times during 2008–09

Real Zaragoza is an association football club based in Zaragoza, Spain, that plays in the Segunda División. The club was formed in 1932 from a merger between Iberia SC and Real Zaragoza CD. It first appeared in La Liga in the 1939–40 season, finishing in 7th position. The team has never won La Liga, but were Segunda División champions in 1977–78. It has had more success in cup competitions, winning the Copa del Rey six times between 1964 and 2004, plus the Supercopa de España in 2004. Real Zaragoza has also made a mark in European competitions, winning the Inter-Cities Fairs Cup (predecessor to the UEFA Europa League) in 1964 and the UEFA Cup Winners' Cup in 1995.

Xavier Aguado holds the record for most overall appearances, having played 473 times between 1990 and 2003. He also has the most league appearances, with 383, ahead of Juan Señor, who has made 304 appearances from 1981 to 1990. Santiago Aragón is third with 303 appearances from 1992 to 2003 for the club. Marcelino is the all-time top scorer with 117. Ewerthon holds the record for the most goals in a season; he scored 28 goals in all competitions during the 2008–09 season. Miguel Pardeza has the most league goals with 76, with Saturnino Arrúa second with 71 goals and Marcelino third with 70 goals.

One of the most famous players to pass through the club was Frank Rijkaard, who played for Real Zaragoza on loan from Sporting CP during the 1987–88 season. He was placed third in the 1988 Ballon d'Or vote, partly based on his performances with Real Zaragoza, as well as those with Milan and the Netherlands national team.

The list includes notable footballers who have played for Real Zaragoza. Generally, this means players that have played at least 100 league games and/or have reached international status.

== Key ==
*	Club record holder
¤	Played their full career at Real Zaragoza

- Players whose name is in italics currently play for the club.
- The years are the first and last calendar years in which the player was registered to the club.
- Appearances and goals comprise only those in league matches; that is those in La Liga, the Segunda División and the Tercera División.

== List of players ==
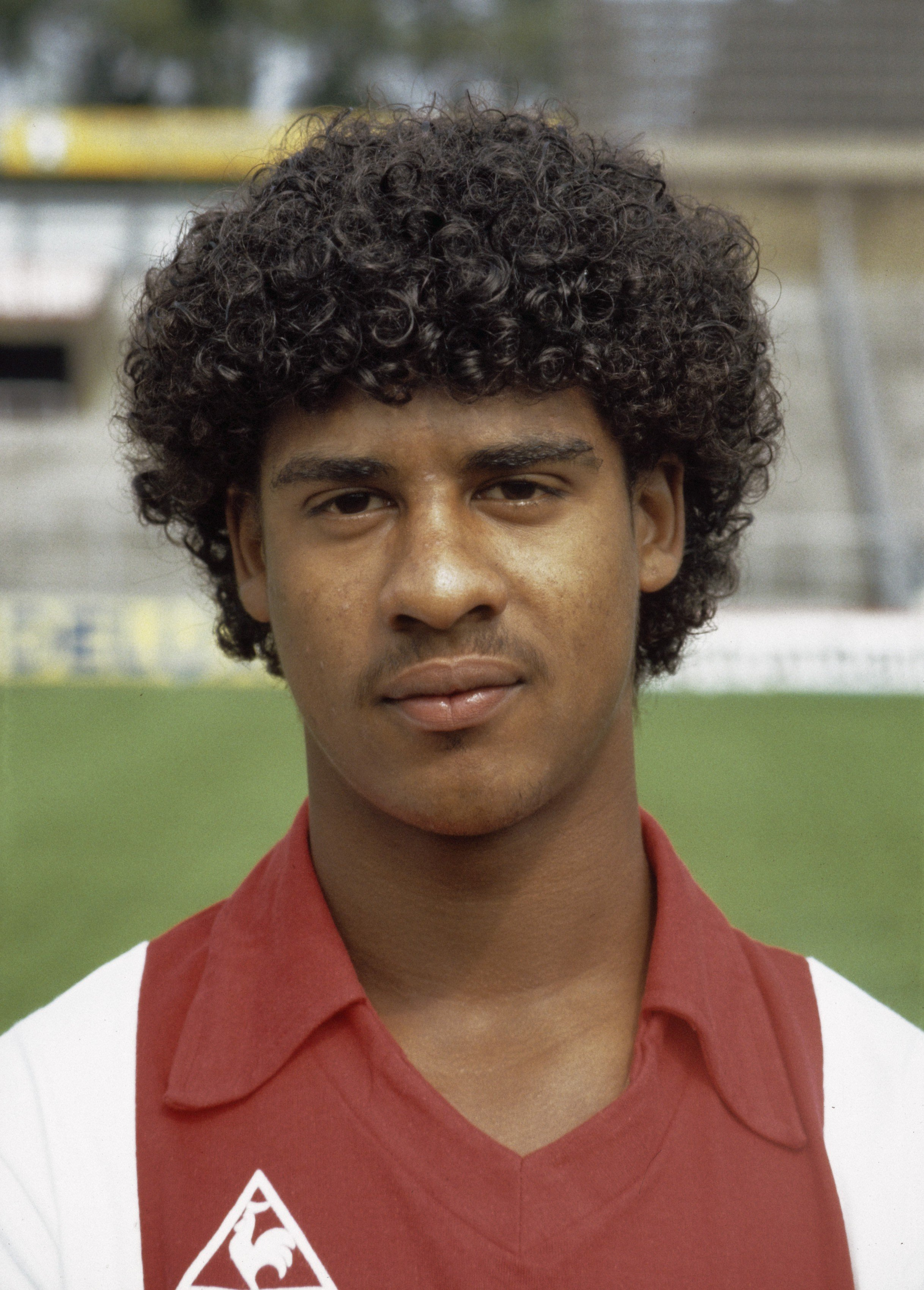
Frank Rijkaard, pictured with Ajax in the Netherlands in 1981, placed third in the 1988 Ballon d'Or vote, partly due to his exploits with Zaragoza

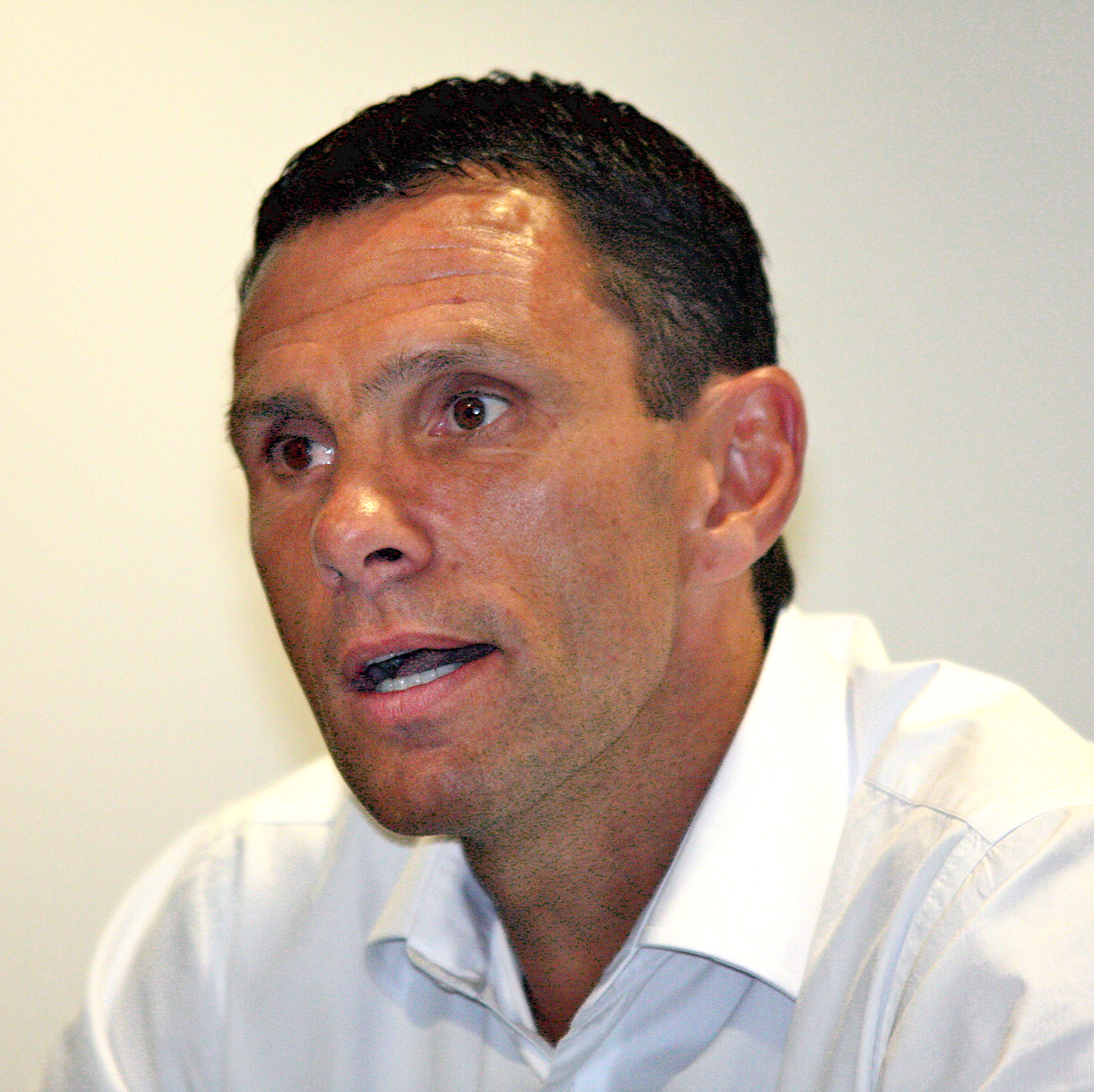
Gus Poyet, pictured while manager of Brighton & Hove Albion in England in 2010, has made the most appearances of any foreign player in Zaragoza's history

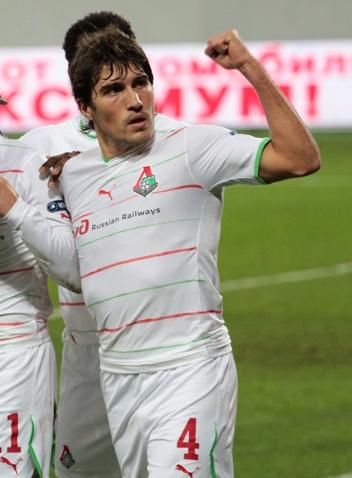
Alberto Zapater, pictured playing for Lokomotiv Moscow in Russia in 2011, between his two spells with Zaragoza, is the current captain of the club

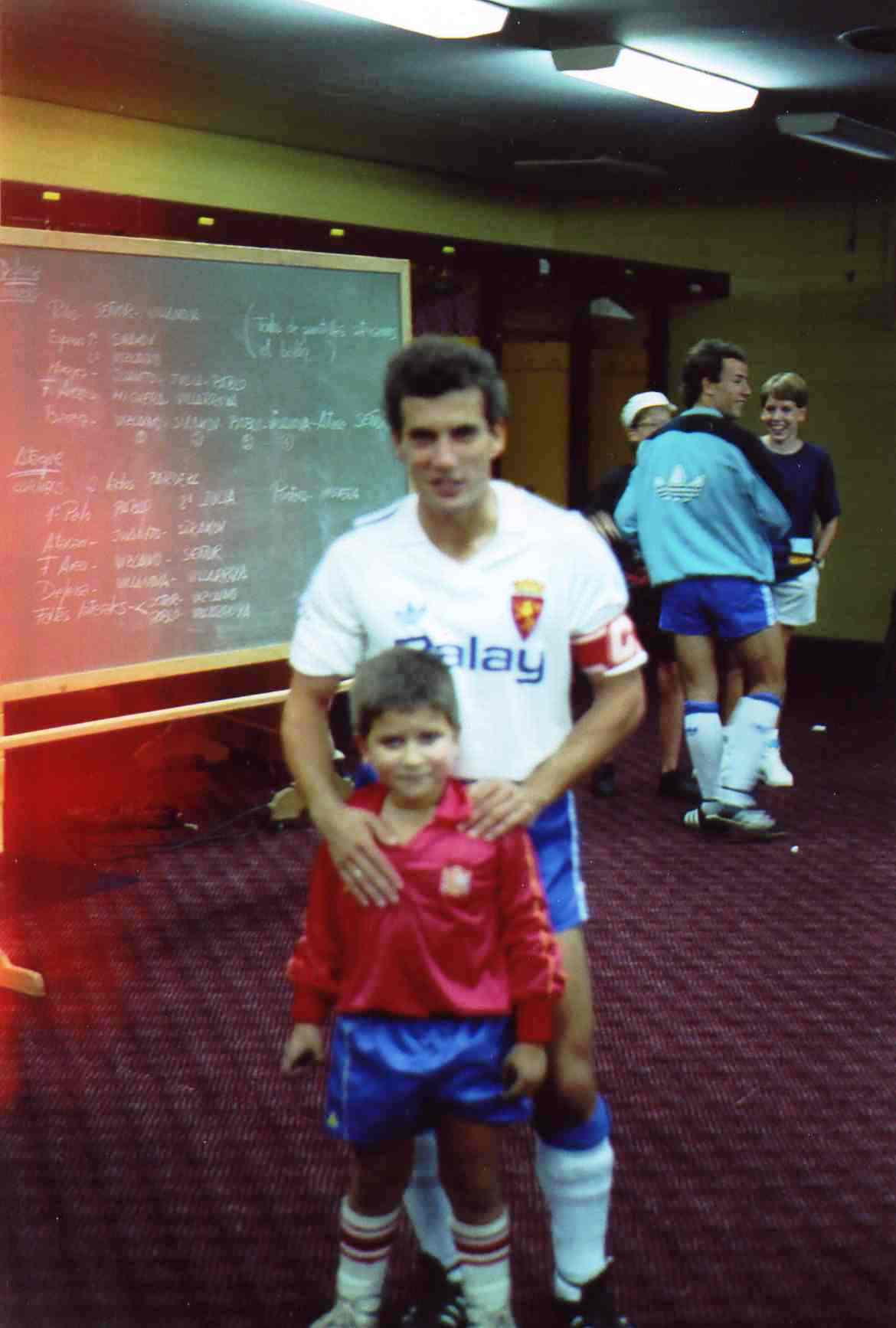
Juan Señor played for the club for nine years, and captained them in the late 1980s

Name	Nat	Pos^{[NB]}	Zaragoza career	Apps	Goals	Notes
Mario Inchausti	(Cuba)	Goalkeeper	1934–1940; 1942	–	–	
Yarza	(Spain)	Goalkeeper	1953–1969	–	–	1964 Copa del Generalísimo winning captain
Carlos Lapetra	(Spain)	Forward	1959–1969	194	38	1966 Copa del Generalísimo winning captain
Marcelino*	(Spain)	Forward	1959–1970	232	70	^{[A]}
Juan Seminario	(Peru)	Forward	1961–1963	38	33	^{[Pichichi]}
Juan Manuel Villa	(Spain)	Midfielder	1962–1971	162	43	
Canário	(Brazil)	Forward	1963–1968	117	35	
Eleuterio Santos	(Spain)	Midfielder	1963–1971	199	54	
José Luis Violeta	(Spain)	Midfielder	1963–1977	–	–	
Carlos Diarte	(Paraguay)	Forward	1973–1976	66	31	
Saturnino Arrúa	(Paraguay)	Midfielder	1973–1979	147	71	
Rui Jordão	(Portugal)	Forward	1976–1977	33	14	
Víctor Muñoz	(Spain)	Midfielder	1976–1981; 1990	131	12	
Radomir Antić	(Socialist Federal Republic of Yugoslavia)	Defender	1978–1980	58	7	
Jorge Valdano	(Argentina)	Forward	1979–1984	143	47	
Marcelo Trobbiani	(Argentina)	Midfielder	1980	15	2	
Juan Señor	(Spain)	Midfielder	1981–1990	304	54	
Juan Barbas	(Argentina)	Midfielder	1982–1985	91	19	
Pedro María Herrera	(Spain)	Midfielder	1982–1988	155	18	
Rafael García Cortés	(Spain)	Defender	1983–1987	148	11	
Ivica Šurjak	(Socialist Federal Republic of Yugoslavia)	Midfielder	1984–1985	22	4	
Andoni Cedrún	(Spain)	Goalkeeper	1984–1996	301	0	
Patricio Yáñez	(Chile)	Forward	1985–1986	29	4	
Miguel Pardeza*	(Spain)	Forward	1985–1986; 1987–1997	297	76	^{[B]} 1994 Copa del Rey winning captain 1995 UEFA Cup Winners' Cup winning captain
Rubén Sosa	(Uruguay)	Forward	1985–1988	106	33	
Frank Rijkaard	(Netherlands)	Midfielder	1987–1988	11	0	
Juanito	(Spain)	Defender	1987–1990	95	14	
Nasko Sirakov	(Bulgaria)	Forward	1988–1990	41	10	
Juan Vizcaíno	(Spain)	Midfielder	1988–1990	86	10	
José Luis Chilavert	(Paraguay)	Goalkeeper	1988–1991	79	1	
Pablo Alfaro	(Spain)	Defender	1988–1992	107	2	
Francisco Higuera	(Spain)	Midfielder	1988–1997	276	63	
Alberto Belsué	(Spain)	Defender	1988–1998	277	7	
Bozhidar Iskrenov	(Bulgaria)	Midfielder	1989	10	1	
Jesús García Sanjuán	(Spain)	Midfielder	1989–1998	180	5	
Dorin Mateuț	(Romania)	Midfielder	1990–1992	64	10	
Gus Poyet*	(Uruguay)	Midfielder	1990–1997	239	63	^{[C]}
Xavier Aguado*	(Spain)	Defender	1990–2003	383	22	^{[D]}
Darío Franco	(Argentina)	Forward	1991–1995	91	7	
Andreas Brehme	(Germany)	Defender	1992–1993	24	1	
Santiago Aragón	(Spain)	Midfielder	1992–2003	303	35	
Luis Cuartero	(Spain)	Defender	1992–2009¤	190	0	2004 Copa del Rey winning captain
Juan Esnáider	(Argentina)	Forward	1993–1995; 2000–2001	78	40	
Fernando Cáceres	(Argentina)	Defender	1993–1996	91	3	
Nayim	(Spain)	Midfielder	1993–1997	123	5	
Juanmi	(Spain)	Goalkeeper	1993–2002	222	0	
Cafu	(Brazil)	Defender	1995	16	0	
Sergio Berti	(Argentina)	Midfielder	1995–1996	16	0	
Fernando Morientes	(Spain)	Forward	1995–1997	66	28	
Kily González	(Argentina)	Midfielder	1996–1999	90	15	
Gustavo López	(Argentina)	Midfielder	1996–1999	105	12	
Vladislav Radimov	(Russia)	Midfielder	1996–2000	63	5	
Otto Konrad	(Austria)	Goalkeeper	1997–1998	25	0	
Roberto Acuña	(Paraguay)	Midfielder	1997–2002	153	20	
Gary Sundgren	(Sweden)	Goalkeeper	1997–2002	111	2	
Marcos Vales	(Spain)	Midfielder	1997–2002	103	11	
Savo Milošević	(Federal Republic of Yugoslavia)	Forward	1998–2000; 2002	88	44	
Paulo Jamelli	(Brazil)	Forward	1998–2002	107	24	
Paco Jémez	(Spain)	Defender	1998–2004	168	1	
Faryd Mondragón	(Colombia)	Goalkeeper	1999	13	0	
Juanele	(Spain)	Forward	1999–2004	130	19	
Sergei Gurenko	(Belarus)	Defender	2000–2001	11	0	
Daniel Montenegro	(Argentina)	Midfielder	2000–2001	28	2	
Alen Peternac	(Croatia)	Forward	2000–2003	10	0	
Cani	(Spain)	Midfielder	2000–2006; 2016–2017	154	14	
Slobodan Komljenović	(Serbia and Montenegro)	Defender	2001–2003	38	2	
Mate Bilić	(Croatia)	Forward	2001–2004	18	1	
Miguel Rebosio	(Peru)	Defender	2001–2004	93	1	
Goran Drulić	(Serbia and Montenegro)	Forward	2001–2005	39	3	
Luciano Galletti	(Argentina)	Midfielder	2001–2005	134	14	
Constantin Gâlcă	(Romania)	Midfielder	2003	24	0	
David Villa	(Spain)	Forward	2003–2005	73	32	
Sávio	(Brazil)	Midfielder	2003–2006	95	16	
Leonardo Ponzio	(Argentina)	Midfielder	2003–2006; 2009–2012	214	11	
Gabriel Milito	(Argentina)	Defender	2003–2007	137	5	
Javi Moreno	(Spain)	Forward	2004–2005	18	4	
José María Movilla	(Spain)	Midfielder	2004–2007; 2012–2014	141	1	
Óscar	(Spain)	Midfielder	2004–2008	129	14	
Alberto Zapater	(Spain)	Midfielder	2004–2009; 2016–	232	7	Current captain
César Sánchez	(Spain)	Goalkeeper	2005–2008	110	0	
Sergio García	(Spain)	Forward	2005–2008	90	14	
Diego Milito	(Argentina)	Forward	2005–2008	108	53	
Ewerthon*	(Brazil)	Forward	2005–2010	111	48	^{[E]}
Andrés D'Alessandro	(Argentina)	Midfielder	2006–2007	50	4	
Gerard Piqué	(Spain)	Defender	2006–2007	22	2	
Pablo Aimar	(Argentina)	Midfielder	2006–2008	53	5	
Carlos Diogo	(Uruguay)	Defender	2006–2011; 2014–2015	116	6	
Gustavo Nery	(Brazil)	Defender	2007	4	0	
Ricardo Oliveira	(Brazil)	Forward	2007–2009	54	27	
Roberto Ayala	(Argentina)	Defender	2007–2010	72	4	
Gabi	(Spain)	Midfielder	2007–2011	135	16	
Fábio Coentrão	(Portugal)	Defender	2008	1	0	
Ander Herrera	(Spain)	Midfielder	2008–2011	82	6	
Abel Aguilar	(Colombia)	Midfielder	2009–2010	27	4	
Marko Babić	(Croatia)	Midfielder	2009–2010	14	0	
Juan Pablo Carrizo	(Argentina)	Goalkeeper	2009–2010	16	0	
Ikechukwu Uche	(Nigeria)	Forward	2009–2011	18	1	
Ivan Obradović	(Serbia)	Defender	2009–2013	47	0	
Jiří Jarošík	(Czech Republic)	Defender	2010–2011	55	5	
Florent Sinama Pongolle	(France)	Forward	2010–2011	24	4	
Ádám Pintér	(Hungary)	Midfielder	2010–2013	44	0	
Leo Franco	(Argentina)	Goalkeeper	2010–2014	67	0	
Efraín Juárez	(Mexico)	Midfielder	2011	15	1	
Pablo Barrera	(Mexico)	Midfielder	2011–2012	20	1	
Fernando Meira	(Portugal)	Defender	2011–2012	12	0	
Rúben Micael	(Portugal)	Midfielder	2011–2012	33	0	
Hélder Postiga	(Portugal)	Forward	2011–2013	70	23	
Stefan Babović	(Serbia)	Midfielder	2012–2013	9	0	
Romaric	(Ivory Coast)	Midfielder	2012–2013	12	0	
Cristian Săpunaru	(Romania)	Defender	2012–2013	29	2	
Cezary Wilk	(Poland)	Midfielder	2015–2018	11	1	
Giorgi Papunashvili	(Georgia (country))	Midfielder	2017–2020	53	9	

== Notes ==
For a full description of positions see football positions.

- Pichichi.^{a} Won the Pichichi Trophy while at Real Zaragoza.
- A. Marcelino holds the record for most Real Zaragoza goals, with 117.
- B. Miguel Pardeza holds the record for most Real Zaragoza league goals, with 76.
- C. Gus Poyet holds the record for most Real Zaragoza appearances by a foreign player, with 239.
- D. Xavier Aguado holds the record for most Real Zaragoza appearances, with 473. He has also played the most minutes, with 33,480, and received the most red cards, with 18.
- E. Ewerthon holds the record for most Real Zaragoza goals in a single season, with 28 during 2008–09.
