= 1964 Copa del Generalísimo final =

Copa del Generalísimo 1964 final
- Event: 1963-64 Copa del Generalísimo
Zaragoza	Atlético Madrid
2	1
- Date: 5 July 1964
- Venue: Santiago Bernabéu, Madrid
- Referee: Félix Birigay
- Attendance: 75,000

The Copa del Generalísimo 1964 final was the 62nd final of the King's Cup. The final was played at Santiago Bernabéu in Madrid, on 5 July 1964, being won by Real Zaragoza CD, who beat Club Atlético de Madrid 2–1.

== Match details ==
5 July 1964
20:30 CET

Zaragoza	2–1	Atlético Madrid
Lapetra 18'; Villa 33'	Report	Cardona 71'

Santiago Bernabéu, Madrid
Attendance: 75,000
Referee: Félix Birigay

Zaragoza
Atlético Madrid

Real Zaragoza CD:
GK	1	(Spain) Enrique Yarza (c)
DF	2	(Spain) Joaquín Cortizo
DF	3	(Spain) Paco Santamaría
DF	4	(Spain) Severino Reija
MF	5	(Spain) Santiago Isasi
MF	6	(Spain) Pepín
FW	7	(Brazil) Canário
FW	8	(Spain) Eleuterio Santos
FW	9	(Spain) Marcelino
FW	10	(Spain) Juan Manuel Villa
FW	11	(Spain) Carlos Lapetra
Manager:
(Spain) Luis Belló

Club Atlético de Madrid:
GK	1	(Argentina) Edgardo Madinabeytia
DF	2	(Spain) Feliciano Rivilla
DF	3	(Argentina) Jorge Griffa
DF	4	(Spain) Isacio Calleja
MF	5	(Brazil) Ramiro
MF	6	(Spain) Jesús Glaría
FW	7	(Spain) Jesús Martínez Jayo
FW	8	(Honduras) José Cardona
FW	9	(Spain) Miguel Jones
FW	10	(Spain) Adelardo
FW	11	(Spain) Enrique Collar (c)
Manager:
(Spain) Sabino Barinaga
