= 1965 Copa del Generalísimo final =

Copa del Generalísimo 1965 final
- Event: 1964-65 Copa del Generalísimo
Atlético Madrid	Zaragoza
1	0
- Date: 4 July 1965
- Venue: Santiago Bernabéu, Madrid
- Referee: Gaspar Pintado
- Attendance: 90,000

The Copa del Generalísimo 1965 final was the 63rd final of the King's Cup. The final was played at Santiago Bernabéu Stadium in Madrid, on 4 July 1965, being won by Atlético de Madrid who beat Real Zaragoza 1–0, gaining revenge for the defeat by the same opponent in the 1964 final.

== Match details ==
4 July 1965
20:30 CET

Atlético Madrid	1–0	Zaragoza
Cardona 65'	Report (in Spanish)

Santiago Bernabéu, Madrid
Attendance: 90,000
Referee: Gaspar Pintado

Atlético Madrid
Zaragoza

GK	1	(Argentina) Edgardo Madinabeytia
DF	2	(Spain) Feliciano Rivilla
DF	3	(Argentina) Jorge Griffa
DF	4	(Spain) Isacio Calleja
MF	5	(Spain) Manuel Ruiz Sosa
MF	6	(Spain) Jesús Glaría
FW	7	(Spain) José Armando Ufarte
FW	8	(Honduras) José Cardona
FW	9	(Portugal) Jorge Alberto Mendonça
FW	10	(Spain) Adelardo
FW	11	(Spain) Enrique Collar (c)
Manager:
(Brazil) Otto Bumbel

GK	1	(Spain) Enrique Yarza (c)
DF	2	(Spain) Juan Zubiaurre
DF	3	(Spain) Paco Santamaría
DF	4	(Spain) Severino Reija
MF	5	(Uruguay) Eduardo Endériz
MF	6	(Spain) José Luis Violeta
FW	7	(Brazil) Canário
FW	8	(Spain) Eleuterio Santos
FW	9	(Spain) Marcelino
FW	10	(Spain) Juan Manuel Villa
FW	11	(Spain) Carlos Lapetra
Manager:
(Argentina) Roque Olsen
