= 1966 Copa del Generalísimo final =

Copa del Generalísimo 1966 final
- Event: 1965-66 Copa del Generalísimo
Zaragoza	Atlético Bilbao
2	0
- Date: 29 May 1966
- Venue: Santiago Bernabéu, Madrid
- Referee: Félix Birigay
- Attendance: 95,000

The Copa del Generalísimo 1966 final was the 64th final of the King's Cup. The final was played at Santiago Bernabéu in Madrid on 29 May 1966 and was won by Real Zaragoza (playing in their fourth consecutive final), who beat Atlético Bilbao 2–0.

== Match details ==
29 May 1966
20:00 CET

Zaragoza	2–0	Atlético Bilbao
Villa 26'; Lapetra 41'	Report

Santiago Bernabéu, Madrid
Attendance: 95,000
Referee: Félix Birigay

Zaragoza
Atlético Bilbao

GK	1	(Spain) Enrique Yarza
DF	2	(Spain) José Ramón Irusquieta
DF	3	(Spain) Paco Santamaría
DF	4	(Spain) Severino Reija
MF	5	(Spain) Antonio Pais
MF	6	(Spain) José Luis Violeta
FW	7	(Brazil) Canário
FW	8	(Spain) Eleuterio Santos
FW	9	(Spain) Marcelino
FW	10	(Spain) Juan Manuel Villa
FW	11	(Spain) Carlos Lapetra (c)
Manager:
(Czechoslovakia) Ferdinand Daučík

GK	1	(Spain) José Ángel Iribar
DF	2	(Spain) Luis María Zugazaga (c)
DF	3	(Spain) Juan María Zorriketa
DF	4	(Spain) Ramón Senarriaga
MF	5	(Spain) Fidel Uriarte
MF	6	(Spain) José Larrauri
FW	7	(Spain) Koldo Aguirre
FW	8	(Spain) José Argoitia
FW	9	(Spain) Antón Arieta
FW	10	(Spain) Pedro Lavín
FW	11	(Spain) Txetxu Rojo
Manager:
(Spain) Agustín Gaínza
