= 1963 Copa del Generalísimo final =

- Event: 1962–63 Copa del Generalísimo
Barcelona	Zaragoza
3	1
- Date: 24 June 1963
- Venue: Camp Nou, Barcelona
- Referee: José Luis López Zaballa
- Attendance: 90,000

The 1963 Copa del Generalísimo final was the 61st final of the Copa del Rey. The final was played at Camp Nou in Barcelona, on 24 June 1963, being won by FC Barcelona, who beat Real Zaragoza CD 3–1.

== Details ==
24 June 1963
19:00 CET

Barcelona	3–1	Zaragoza
Pereda 9'; Kocsis 18'; Zaldúa 59'	Report (in Spanish)	Villa 61'

Camp Nou, Barcelona
Attendance: 90,000
Referee: José Luis López Zaballa

Barcelona
Zaragoza

FC Barcelona:
GK	1	(Spain) José Manuel Pesudo
DF	2	(Spain) Rodri
DF	3	(Spain) Ferran Olivella
DF	4	(Spain) Sígfrid Gràcia
MF	5	(Spain) Joan Segarra (c)
MF	6	(Spain) Jesús Garay
FW	7	(Spain) Pedro Zaballa
FW	8	(Spain) Martí Vergés
FW	9	(Spain) José Antonio Zaldúa
FW	10	(Hungary) Sándor Kocsis
FW	11	(Spain) Pereda
Manager:
(Spain) José Gonzalvo

Real Zaragoza CD:
GK	1	(Spain) Enrique Yarza (c)
DF	2	(Spain) Juan Zubiaurre
DF	3	(Spain) Paco Santamaría
DF	4	(Spain) Joaquín Cortizo
MF	5	(Spain) Santiago Isasi
MF	6	(Spain) Pepín
FW	7	(Spain) Joaquín Murillo
FW	8	(Peru) Sigifredo Martínez
FW	9	(Spain) Marcelino
FW	10	(Spain) Juan Manuel Villa
FW	11	(Spain) Carlos Lapetra
Manager:
(Spain) César Rodríguez
