= 1964 Inter-Cities Fairs Cup final =

- Event: 1963–64 Inter-Cities Fairs Cup
Zaragoza	Valencia
(Spain)	(Spain)
2	1
- Date: 24 June 1964
- Venue: Camp Nou, Barcelona
- Referee: Joaquim Fernandes de Campos (Portugal)
- Attendance: 50,000

The 1964 Inter-Cities Fairs Cup final was the final of the sixth Inter-Cities Fairs Cup and the first of two that were not played over two legs. It was played on 24 June 1964 between Zaragoza and Valencia of Spain. This marked the third consecutive appearance in the competition's final by Valencia, who entered the match as two-time defending Inter-Cities champions. However, Zaragoza won 2–1.

== Route to the final ==
Zaragoza					Round	Valencia				
Opponent	Agg.	1st leg	2nd leg	Replay (if necessary)		Opponent	Agg.	1st leg	2nd leg	Replay (if necessary)
(Greece) Iraklis	9–1	3–0 (A)	6–1 (H)		First round	(Republic of Ireland) Shamrock Rovers	3–2	1–0 (A)	2–2 (H)	
(Switzerland) Lausanne-Sport	5–1	2–1 (A)	3–0 (H)		Second round	(Austria) Rapid Wien	3–2	0–0 (A)	3–2 (H)	
(Italy) Juventus	3–2	3–2 (H)	0–0 (A)		Quarter-finals	(Hungary) Újpesti Dózsa	6–5	5–2 (H)	1–3 (A)	
(Belgium) RFC Liège	2–2	0–1 (A)	2–1 (H)	2–0 (H)	Semi-finals	(West Germany) 1. FC Köln	4–3	4–1 (H)	0–2 (A)	

== Match details ==
24 June 1964

Zaragoza (Spain)	2–1	(Spain) Valencia
Villa 40'; Marcelino 83'		Urtiaga 42'

Camp Nou, Barcelona
Attendance: 50,000
Referee: (Portugal) Joaquim Fernandes de Campos

Zaragoza
Valencia

GK	1	(Spain) Enrique Yarza
DF	2	(Spain) Joaquín Cortizo
DF	5	(Spain) Paco Santamaría
DF	3	(Spain) Severino Reija
MF	4	(Spain) Santiago Isasi
MF	6	(Spain) Pepín
FW	7	(Brazil) (Spain) Canário
FW	8	(Brazil) Duca
FW	9	(Spain) Marcelino
FW	10	(Spain) Juan Manuel Villa
FW	11	(Spain) Carlos Lapetra
Manager:
(Spain) Luis Belló

GK	1	(Spain) Ricardo Zamora de Grassa
DF	2	(Spain) Alberto Arnal
DF	5	(Spain) Quincoces
DF	3	(Spain) Francisco Vidagany
MF	4	(Spain) Paquito
MF	6	(Spain) Roberto Gil
FW	7	(Spain) Suco	(red card) 89'
FW	8	(Spain) Vicente Guillot
FW	9	(Brazil) Waldo
FW	10	(Spain) José Antonio Urtiaga
FW	11	(Spain) Ficha
Manager:
(Spain) Edmundo Suárez Mundo

== See also ==
- 1963–64 Inter-Cities Fairs Cup
- Valencia CF in European football
