= José Ramón Irusquieta =

Spanish footballer (1939–2023)

Personal information
- Full name: José Ramón Irusquieta García
- Date of birth: 7 September 1940
- Place of birth: Bilbao, Spain
- Date of death: 7 March 2023 (aged 82)
- Place of death: Bilbao, Spain
- Height: 1.73 m (5 ft 8 in)
- Position: Right-back

Youth career
- Indauchu

Senior career*
Years	Team	Apps	(Gls)
1960–1965	Indauchu	66	(0)
1965–1972	Zaragoza	137	(0)
1972–1973	Tudelano		
Total		203+	(0)
- * Club domestic league appearances and goals

José Ramón Irusquieta García (7 September 1940 – 7 March 2023) was a Spanish footballer who played as a right back.

He spent most of his career at Real Zaragoza, playing 179 games over eight seasons and winning the Copa del Generalísimo in 1966.

== Career ==
Born in Bilbao in the Basque Country, Irusquieta began his career with nearby Indauchu, where he made his debut in the Segunda División in 1960–61.

In January 1965, Irusquieta transferred to Real Zaragoza in La Liga for a fee of 200,000 Spanish pesetas. He arrived as an emergency replacement for Joaquín Cortizo, who had been banned for 24 games for an assault on Atlético Madrid's Enrique Collar. The Zaragoza side of the 1960s were known as Los Magníficos, and Irusquieta became a regular part of the defence alongside Paco Santamaría, José Luis Violeta and Severino Reija. He reflected in 2016 that he played "very far back", compared to left-back Rejia who advanced forwards.

On 29 May 1966, Irusquieta played the final of the Copa del Generalísimo, a 2–0 win over his hometown side Atlético Bilbao. In September, he played both legs of the Inter-Cities Fairs Cup final, losing 4–3 on aggregate to compatriots Barcelona.

Irusquieta remained at La Romareda until 1972, with his final season being in the second tier. He and Eleuterio Santos were the last of the Magníficos, and their contracts expired as they did not play 20 games in their final season. Former Zaragoza manager Rosendo Hernández signed the pair to Tudelano in the Tercera División, where they ended their careers.

== Personal life and death ==
Irusquieta's older brothers Ignacio Irusquieta and José María Irusquieta were both professional footballers, with the former playing in the top flight for Deportivo de La Coruña, Atlético Madrid and Mallorca.

Irusquieta died on 7 March 2023 in Bilbao, aged 82.
