= List of Copa del Rey finals =

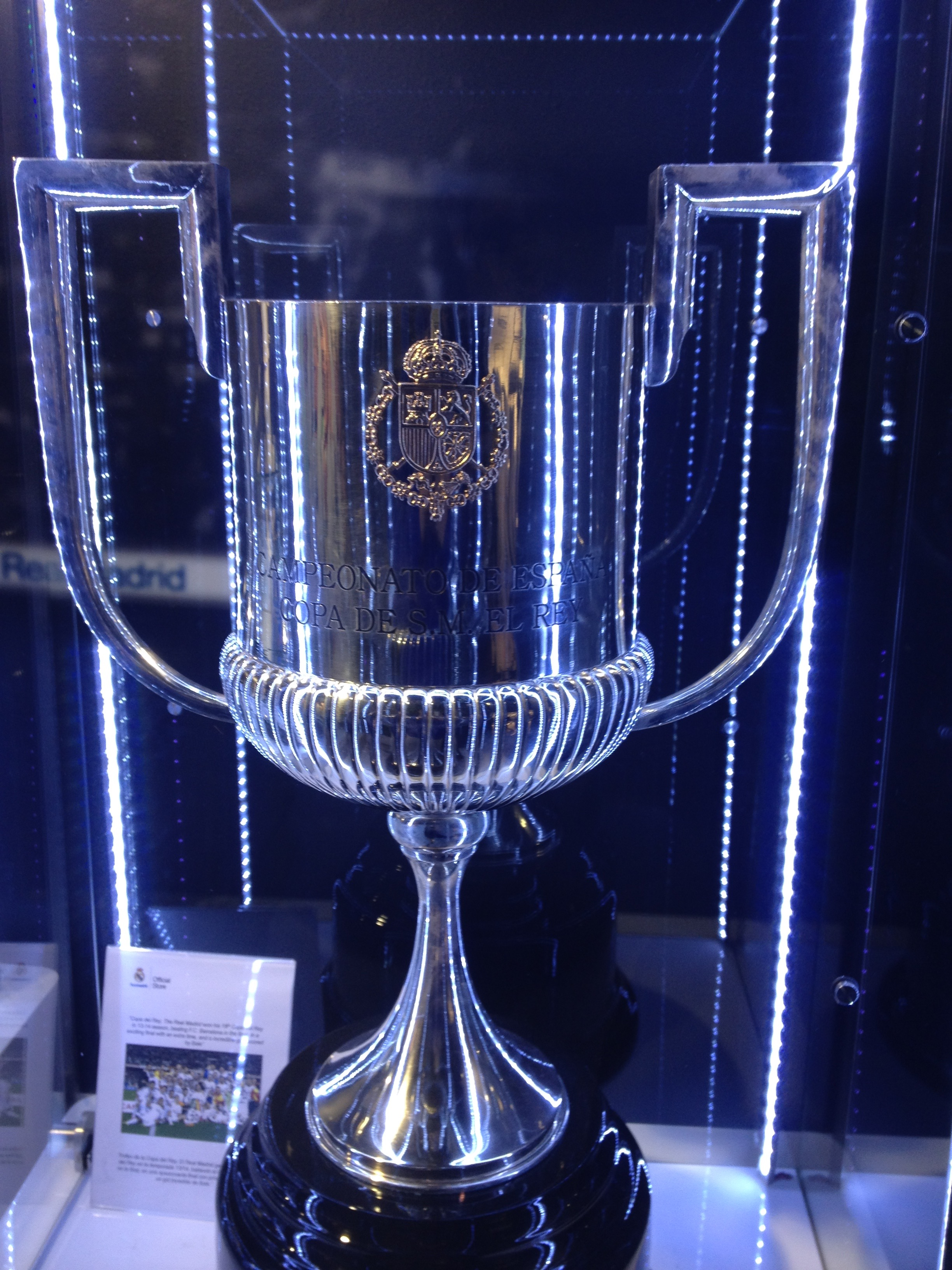
- The 2013–14 Copa del Rey trophy, won by Real Madrid
- Founded: 1903; 123 years ago
- Region: Spain
- Teams: 116
- Current champions: Real Sociedad (3rd title)
- Most championships: Barcelona (32 titles)
- 2026 Copa del Rey final

The Copa del Rey is an annual knockout football competition in Spanish football, organised by the Royal Spanish Football Federation, held annually since 1903. The competition is open to all Primera and Segunda División teams as well as all Primera, Segunda and Tercera División sides plus the four semi-finalists of the Copa Federación and the ten teams from Divisiones Regionales after passing a preliminary round. The total, adding up to 116 clubs, excludes Spanish reserve teams.

Since the first final between Athletic Bilbao and Real Madrid, 122 single-match finals have taken place. The 1904 final was not held because of a dispute over who should have faced Athletic Bilbao; the latter, having gone to Madrid to play the final nevertheless, were assigned the title. In 1910 and 1913 two parallel tournaments, both eventually recognised, and finals were played due to the conflict between Federación Española de Clubs de Football (the forerunner of the Royal Spanish Football Federation) and the Unión Española de Clubs de Foot-bal. The finals did not take place in 1937 and in 1938 due to the impact of the Spanish Civil War. The 2020 final—due to have taken place in the April of that year between Basque clubs Athletic Bilbao and Real Sociedad—was rescheduled to April 2021 in the hope the match could have been played with spectators in the face of the COVID-19 pandemic. The match was held behind closed doors as Real Sociedad won 1–0.

Four finals were replayed after the first games ended in a draw, with 26 others going to extra time and eight of those requiring a penalty shoot-out to decide a winner.

As of 2026, 36 clubs have competed in the final, of whom 15 have won the tournament at least once. The winning team has also won La Liga (the Spanish top-flight league which began in 1929) in the same season on 18 occasions to complete a domestic double. Barcelona are the only team to win La Liga, the Copa del Rey and the UEFA Champions League in the same year, having done so twice in 2009 and 2015.

Barcelona hold the record for the most wins and most final appearances, with 32 wins from 43 total appearances. Real Madrid hold the record for the most finals lost (21). Of the teams who have participated in more than one final, Español de Madrid and Celta Vigo share the worst win–loss record with three defeats and no victories each. Of the victorious teams, Arenas have the lowest percentage of success, winning one out of four finals (25%). Real Sociedad are the reigning champions, having won their third title in 2026.

== List of finals ==
Key

† Match was won during extra time
* Match was won on a penalty shoot-out
& Match was won after a replay
‡ Winning team won the Double (League title and Copa del Rey)
§ Winning team won the Cup Double (Copa del Rey and European Cup/Champions League)
# Winning team won the Continental Treble (League title, Copa del Rey and European Cup/Champions League)

Copa del Rey finals
Season	Winners	Score	Runners-up	Venue	Attendance
1903	Athletic Bilbao	3–2	Madrid FC	Hipódromo, Madrid	—
1904	Athletic Bilbao	N/A (Note: The 1904 final between Athletic Bilbao and Español de Madrid was not played due to a dispute; Athletic was awarded the trophy.)	Español de Madrid	Tiro del Pichón, Madrid	—
1905	Madrid FC	1–0	Athletic Bilbao	Tiro del Pichón, Madrid	—
1906	Madrid FC	4–1	Athletic Bilbao	Hipódromo, Madrid	—
1907	Madrid FC	1–0	Bizcaya (Note: The number of wins Athletic Bilbao have been credited with is disputed. The 1902 version was won by Bizcaya, a team made up of players from Athletic Bilbao and Bilbao FC. In 1903 these two clubs merged as the current Athletic Bilbao. The 1902 cup is on display in the Athletic museum and the club includes it in its own honors list. However, that edition is not recognized as official by the RFEF. Another version of Bizcaya was formed for the 1907 tournament and reached the final.)	Hipódromo, Madrid	6,000
1908	Madrid FC	2–1	Real Vigo Sporting	O'Donnell, Madrid	4,000
1909	Club Ciclista (Note: The 1909 final was won by Club Ciclista de San Sebastián, using players from the newly-formed team Real Sociedad which was not officially founded until later that year.)	3–1	Español de Madrid	O'Donnell, Madrid	—
1910 UECF (Note: Two finals and winners are recognised for 1910 and 1913.)	Athletic Bilbao	1–0	Vasconia SC (Note: The 1910 tournament was played by Real Sociedad under the umbrella of Vasconia, due to registration issues in respect of it being so recently incorporated.)	Ondarreta, San Sebastián	—
1910 FECF	Barcelona	3–2	Español de Madrid	Tiro del Pichón, Madrid	—
1911	Athletic Bilbao	3–1	Español	Josaleta, Getxo	—
1912	Barcelona	2–0	Gimnástica	La Industria, Barcelona	—
1913 UECF	Barcelona	2–1^{&} (Note: Replay after two-legged tie finished 2–2 and 0–0)	Real Sociedad	La Industria, Barcelona	—
1913 FECF	Racing de Irún (Note: Racing de Irún merged with Irún Sporting Club in 1915 to form Real Unión.)	1–0^{&} (Note: Replay after first match ended 2–2)	Athletic Bilbao	O'Donnell, Madrid	—
1914	Athletic Bilbao	2–1	Espanya	Costorbe, Irún	—
1915	Athletic Bilbao	5–0	Español	Amute, Irún	5,000
1916	Athletic Bilbao	4–0	Madrid FC	La Industria, Barcelona	6,000
1917	Madrid FC	2–1^{&} (Note: After extra time; 1–1 after 90 minutes) (Note: Replay after first match ended 0–0 after extra time)	Arenas	La Industria, Barcelona	2,500
1918	Real Unión	2–0	Madrid FC	O'Donnell, Madrid	—
1919	Arenas	5–2^{†} (Note: After extra time; 2–2 after 90 minutes)	Barcelona	Martínez Campos, Madrid	—
1920	Barcelona	2–0	Athletic Bilbao	El Molinón, Gijón	10,000
1921	Athletic Bilbao	4–1	Atlético Madrid	San Mamés, Bilbao	15,000
1922	Barcelona	5–1	Real Unión	Coia, Vigo	12,000
1923	Athletic Bilbao	1–0	Europa	Les Corts, Barcelona	30,000
1924	Real Unión	1–0	Real Madrid	Atotxa, San Sebastián	—
1925	Barcelona	2–0	Arenas	Reina Victoria, Seville	6,000
1926	Barcelona	3–2^{†}	Atlético Madrid	Mestalla, Valencia	17,000
1927	Real Unión	1–0^{†} (Note: After extra time; 0–0 after 90 minutes)	Arenas	Torrero, Zaragoza	16,000
1928	Barcelona	3–1^{&} (Note: Second replay after first matches both ended 1–1 after extra time)	Real Sociedad	El Sardinero, Santander	18,000
1928–29	RCD Español	2–1	Real Madrid	Mestalla, Valencia	25,000
1930	Athletic Bilbao ‡	3–2^{†}	Real Madrid	Montjuïc, Barcelona	63,000
1931	Athletic Bilbao ‡	3–1	Real Betis	Chamartín, Madrid	20,000
1932	Athletic Bilbao	1–0	Barcelona	Chamartín, Madrid	25,000
1933	Athletic Bilbao	2–1	Real Madrid	Montjuïc, Barcelona	60,000
1934	Madrid	2–1	Valencia	Montjuïc, Barcelona	46,000
1935	Sevilla	3–0	Sabadell	Chamartín, Madrid	15,000
1936	Madrid	2–1	Barcelona	Mestalla, Valencia	22,000
1937–1938	Not played due to Spanish Civil War.				
1939	Sevilla	6–2	Racing de Ferrol	Montjuïc, Barcelona	60,000
1940	Español	3–2^{†}	Real Madrid	Campo de Vallecas, Madrid	20,000
1941	Valencia	3–1	Español	Chamartín, Madrid	23,000
1942	Barcelona	4–3^{†} (Note: After extra time; 3–3 after 90 minutes)	Atlético Bilbao	Chamartín, Madrid	30,000
1943	Atlético Bilbao ‡	1–0^{†}	Real Madrid	Estadio Metropolitano, Madrid	50,000
1944	Atlético Bilbao	2–0	Valencia	Montjuïc, Barcelona	65,000
1944–45	Atlético Bilbao	3–2	Valencia	Montjuïc, Barcelona	55,000
1946	Real Madrid	3–1	Valencia	Montjuïc, Barcelona	60,000
1947	Real Madrid	2–0^{†}	Español	Riazor, A Coruña	30,000
1947–48	Sevilla	4–1	Celta Vigo	Nuevo Chamartín, Madrid	55,000
1948–49	Valencia	1–0	Atlético Bilbao	Nuevo Chamartín, Madrid	70,000
1949–50	Atlético Bilbao	4–1^{†}	Valladolid	Nuevo Chamartín, Madrid	80,000
1951	Barcelona	3–0	Real Sociedad	Nuevo Chamartín, Madrid	75,000
1952	Barcelona ‡	4–2^{†}	Valencia	Nuevo Chamartín, Madrid	80,000
1952–53	Barcelona ‡	2–1	Atlético Bilbao	Nuevo Chamartín, Madrid	67,145
1954	Valencia	3–0	Barcelona	Nuevo Chamartín, Madrid	110,000
1955	Atlético Bilbao	1–0	Sevilla	Santiago Bernabéu, Madrid	100,000
1956	Atlético Bilbao ‡	2–1	Atlético Madrid	Santiago Bernabéu, Madrid	125,000
1957	Barcelona	1–0	Español	Montjuïc, Barcelona	75,000
1958	Atlético Bilbao	2–0	Real Madrid	Santiago Bernabéu, Madrid	100,000
1958–59	Barcelona ‡	4–1	Granada	Santiago Bernabéu, Madrid	90,000
1959–60	Atlético Madrid	3–1	Real Madrid	Santiago Bernabéu, Madrid	100,000
1960–61	Atlético Madrid	3–2	Real Madrid	Santiago Bernabéu, Madrid	120,000
1961–62	Real Madrid ‡	2–1	Sevilla	Santiago Bernabéu, Madrid	90,000
1962–63	Barcelona	3–1	Zaragoza	Camp Nou, Barcelona	90,000
1963–64	Zaragoza	2–1	Atlético Madrid	Santiago Bernabéu, Madrid	75,000
1964–65	Atlético Madrid	1–0	Zaragoza	Santiago Bernabéu, Madrid	90,000
1965–66	Zaragoza	2–0	Atlético Bilbao	Santiago Bernabéu, Madrid	95,000
1966–67	Valencia	2–1	Atlético Bilbao	Santiago Bernabéu, Madrid	100,000
1967–68	Barcelona	1–0	Real Madrid	Santiago Bernabéu, Madrid	100,000
1969	Atlético Bilbao	1–0	Elche	Santiago Bernabéu, Madrid	120,000
1969–70	Real Madrid	3–1	Valencia	Camp Nou, Barcelona	80,000
1970–71	Barcelona	4–3^{†}	Valencia	Santiago Bernabéu, Madrid	100,000
1971–72	Atlético Madrid	2–1	Valencia	Santiago Bernabéu, Madrid	100,000
1972–73	Athletic Bilbao	2–0	Castellón	Vicente Calderón, Madrid	64,200
1973–74	Real Madrid	4–0	Barcelona	Vicente Calderón, Madrid	48,000
1974–75	Real Madrid ‡	0–0* (Note: 4–3 in penalty shoot-out)	Atlético Madrid	Vicente Calderón, Madrid	60,000
1975–76	Atlético Madrid	1–0	Zaragoza	Santiago Bernabéu, Madrid	80,000
1976–77	Real Betis	2–2* (Note: 8–7 in penalty shoot-out)	Athletic Bilbao	Vicente Calderón, Madrid	70,000
1977–78	Barcelona	3–1	Las Palmas	Santiago Bernabéu, Madrid	60,000
1978–79	Valencia	2–0	Real Madrid	Vicente Calderón, Madrid	70,000
1979–80	Real Madrid ‡	6–1	Castilla (Note: Real Madrid's reserve team. Reserve teams have been banned from this competition from 1990–91 onward.)	Santiago Bernabéu, Madrid	65,000
1980–81	Barcelona	3–1	Sporting Gijón	Vicente Calderón, Madrid	50,000
1981–82	Real Madrid	2–1	Sporting Gijón	José Zorrilla, Valladolid	30,000
1982–83	Barcelona	2–1	Real Madrid	La Romareda, Zaragoza	35,000
1983–84	Athletic Bilbao ‡	1–0	Barcelona	Santiago Bernabéu, Madrid	100,000
1984–85	Atlético Madrid	2–1	Athletic Bilbao	Santiago Bernabéu, Madrid	85,000
1985–86	Zaragoza	1–0	Barcelona	Vicente Calderón, Madrid	45,000
1986–87	Real Sociedad	2–2* (Note: 4–2 in penalty shoot-out)	Atlético Madrid	La Romareda, Zaragoza	37,000
1987–88	Barcelona	1–0	Real Sociedad	Santiago Bernabéu, Madrid	70,000
1988–89	Real Madrid ‡	1–0	Valladolid	Vicente Calderón, Madrid	30,000
1989–90	Barcelona	2–0	Real Madrid	Luis Casanova, Valencia	44,240
1990–91	Atlético Madrid	1–0^{†}	Mallorca	Santiago Bernabéu, Madrid	60,000
1991–92	Atlético Madrid	2–0	Real Madrid	Santiago Bernabéu, Madrid	70,000
1992–93	Real Madrid	2–0	Zaragoza	Luis Casanova, Valencia	42,000
1993–94	Zaragoza	0–0* (Note: 5–4 in penalty shoot-out)	Celta Vigo	Vicente Calderón, Madrid	60,000
1994–95	Deportivo La Coruña	2–1	Valencia	Santiago Bernabéu, Madrid	95,000
1995–96	Atlético Madrid ‡	1–0^{†}	Barcelona	La Romareda, Zaragoza	37,000
1996–97	Barcelona	3–2^{†}	Real Betis	Santiago Bernabéu, Madrid	82,498
1997–98	Barcelona ‡	1–1*	Mallorca	Mestalla, Valencia	54,000
1998–99	Valencia	3–0	Atlético Madrid	Estadio Olímpico, Seville	45,000
1999–2000	Espanyol	2–1	Atlético Madrid	Mestalla, Valencia	55,000
2000–01	Zaragoza	3–1	Celta Vigo	Estadio Olímpico, Seville	38,000
2001–02	Deportivo La Coruña	2–1	Real Madrid	Santiago Bernabéu, Madrid	75,000
2002–03	Mallorca	3–0	Recreativo	Martínez Valero, Elche	35,000
2003–04	Zaragoza	3–2^{†}	Real Madrid	Lluís Companys, Barcelona	54,000
2004–05	Real Betis	2–1^{†}	Osasuna	Vicente Calderón, Madrid	55,000
2005–06	Espanyol	4–1	Zaragoza	Santiago Bernabéu, Madrid	78,000
2006–07	Sevilla	1–0	Getafe	Santiago Bernabéu, Madrid	80,000
2007–08	Valencia	3–1	Getafe	Vicente Calderón, Madrid	54,000
2008–09	Barcelona #	4–1	Athletic Bilbao	Mestalla, Valencia	50,000
2009–10	Sevilla	2–0	Atlético Madrid	Camp Nou, Barcelona	93,000
2010–11	Real Madrid	1–0^{†}	Barcelona	Mestalla, Valencia	55,000
2011–12	Barcelona	3–0	Athletic Bilbao	Vicente Calderón, Madrid	54,850
2012–13	Atlético Madrid	2–1^{†}	Real Madrid	Santiago Bernabéu, Madrid	80,000
2013–14	Real Madrid §	2–1	Barcelona	Mestalla, Valencia	52,953
2014–15	Barcelona #	3–1	Athletic Bilbao	Camp Nou, Barcelona	99,354
2015–16	Barcelona ‡	2–0^{†}	Sevilla	Vicente Calderón, Madrid	54,907
2016–17	Barcelona	3–1	Alavés	Vicente Calderón, Madrid	45,000
2017–18	Barcelona ‡	5–0	Sevilla	Metropolitano Stadium, Madrid	62,623
2018–19	Valencia	2–1	Barcelona	Benito Villamarín, Seville	53,698
2019–20 (Note: The 2020 final was delayed until April 2021 due to the COVID-19 pandemic in Spain in the hope the match could have been attended by spectators.)	Real Sociedad	1–0	Athletic Bilbao	La Cartuja, Seville	0 (Note: The game was played behind closed doors due to the COVID-19 pandemic in Spain.)
2020–21	Barcelona	4–0	Athletic Bilbao	La Cartuja, Seville	0
2021–22	Real Betis	1–1*	Valencia	La Cartuja, Seville	53,387
2022–23	Real Madrid	2–1	Osasuna	La Cartuja, Seville	55,579
2023–24	Athletic Bilbao	1–1*	Mallorca	La Cartuja, Seville	57,619
2024–25	Barcelona ‡	3–2^{†}	Real Madrid	La Cartuja, Seville	55,579
2025–26	Real Sociedad	2–2*	Atlético Madrid	La Cartuja, Seville	70,000

== Performances ==
Results by team
Club	Wins	First final won	Last final won	Runners-up	Last final lost	Total final appearances
Barcelona	32	1910	2025	11	2019	43
Athletic Bilbao	24	1903	2024	16	2021	40
Real Madrid	20	1905	2023	21	2025	41
Atlético Madrid	10	1960	2013	10	2026	20
Valencia	8	1941	2019	10	2022	18
Zaragoza	6	1964	2004	5	2006	11
Sevilla	5	1935	2010	4	2018	9
Espanyol	4	1929	2006	5	1957	9
Real Sociedad	3	1987	2026	4	1988	7
Real Betis	3	1977	2022	2	1997	5
Real Unión	3	1918	1927	1	1922	4
Deportivo La Coruña	2	1995	2002	0	—	2
Arenas	1	1919		3	1927	4
Mallorca	1	2003		3	2024	4
Club Ciclista de San Sebastián	1	1909		0	—	1
Racing Club de Irún	1	1913		0	—	1
Español de Madrid	0	—		3	1910	3
Celta Vigo	0	—		3	2001	3
Sporting Gijón	0	—		2	1982	2
Real Valladolid	0	—		2	1989	2
Getafe	0	—		2	2008	2
Osasuna	0	—		2	2023	2
Bizcaya	0	—		1	1907	1
Real Vigo Sporting	0	—		1	1908	1
Vasconia Sporting Club	0	—		1	1910	1
Gimnástica	0	—		1	1912	1
Espanya de Barcelona	0	—		1	1914	1
CE Europa	0	—		1	1923	1
Sabadell	0	—		1	1935	1
Racing de Ferrol	0	—		1	1939	1
Granada	0	—		1	1959	1
Elche	0	—		1	1969	1
Castellón	0	—		1	1973	1
Las Palmas	0	—		1	1978	1
Real Madrid Castilla	0	—		1	1980	1
Recreativo	0	—		1	2003	1
Alavés	0	—		1	2017	1

== See also ==
- Football records and statistics in Spain#Copa del Rey
