= Santiago Isasi =

Spanish association football player

Personal information
- Full name: Santiago Isasi Salazar
- Date of birth: 25 April 1936
- Place of birth: Madrid, Spain
- Date of death: 12 April 2017 (aged 80)
- Place of death: Palma de Mallorca, Spain
- Position: Midfielder

Senior career*
Years	Team	Apps	(Gls)
1954–1959	Indauchu	137	(11)
1959–1966	Real Zaragoza	169	(7)
Total		306	(18)
- * Club domestic league appearances and goals

Santiago Isasi Salazar (25 April 1936 – 12 April 2017) was a Spanish footballer who played as a midfielder. He spent most of his career at Real Zaragoza, playing 234 games and scoring 14 goals over eight seasons, all in La Liga. He won the Copa del Generalísimo in 1964 and 1966 and the Inter-Cities Fairs Cup in 1964.

== Career ==
Born in Madrid of Basque origin, Isasi began his career at Indauchu in the Basque Country, playing in the Segunda División. In 1959, he transferred to La Liga club Real Zaragoza for a fee of 950,000 Spanish pesetas.

Isasi was part of a Zaragoza side in the 1960s known as Los Magníficos. He made his debut on 13 September 1959 as the season began with a 2–1 loss at Real Valladolid. He was not a frequent goalscorer, but was known for his performance on 28 June 1964 in the semi-finals of the Copa del Generalísimo, in which he scored both goals of a semi-final second leg win at home to Barcelona, after having lost the first leg 3–2 at the Camp Nou; Zaragoza went on to win the trophy. The club won the Inter-Cities Fairs Cup that season too, with Isasi scoring the opening goal of a 3–2 win over Juventus in the first leg of the quarter-final.

Isasi's career ended due to a dispute with manager Ferdinand Daučík in 1966. After a game at Córdoba, the manager announced the sleeping arrangements for the train home, which would have Isasi in a noisy position near the wheels. Paco Santamaría came to Isasi's defence, and the pair were fined before being banned for a year.

== Style of play ==
Isasi played in central midfield for Zaragoza, first alongside Pepín and then Antonio Pais. In his later career Severino Reija took his position, and he played in defence. Zaragoza forward Canário recalled his strength in the air.

== Personal life ==
Isasi had a son of the same name, who played for Zaragoza's reserve team Deportivo Aragón in the late 1980s. Isasi died in Palma de Mallorca on 12 April 2017, aged 80.
