= Sigifredo Martínez =

Peruvian footballer and manager (born 1943)

Personal information
- Full name: José Sigifredo Martínez Ramírez
- Date of birth: 25 December 1943 (age 82)
- Place of birth: Callao, Peru
- Position: Forward

Senior career*
Years	Team	Apps	(Gls)
1962–1967	Real Zaragoza	48	(14)
1967	Recreativo de Huelva	7	(2)
1967–1969	Elche CF	3	(0)
1969–1970	Elche CF Ilicitano	36	(7)
1970	Elche CF	0	(0)
1970–1971	Villarreal CF	25	(2)
1971–1972	Deportivo Aragón	5	(2)
1972–1974	SC Toulon	73	(11)
1974–1975	US Toulouse	31	(2)
1975–1977	AC Arlésien	34	(9)

Managerial career
- 1987–1989: Deportivo Aragón
- 1989–1990: CD Binéfar
- * Club domestic league appearances and goals

José Sigifredo Martínez Ramírez (born 25 December 1943) is a Peruvian football manager and former player. Better known as Sigi Martínez or Sigi Ramírez, he spent his entire career in Spain and then in France in the 1960s and 1970s.

== Biography ==
Sigi Martínez never had the opportunity to play in Peru. In 1962, he moved to Spain and signed with Real Zaragoza, where he played until 1967 (48 matches in total and 14 goals scored). During its time in Zaragoza, the club experienced perhaps the best period in its history club, he won the Copa del Rey twice (in 1964 and 1966) and the Inter-Cities Fairs Cup in 1964.

After stints with other Spanish clubs (including Recreativo de Huelva, Elche CF and Villarreal CF), he continued his career in France from 1972. There, he played for SC Toulon, US Toulouse and AC Arlésien.

Sigi Martínez remained in Spain and worked as a coach. He notably managed Deportivo Aragón between 1987 and 1989.

== Honours ==
=== Player ===
Real Zaragoza

- Copa del Rey (2): 1963–64, 1965–66
- Inter-Cities Fairs Cup: 1963–64
