= Antonio Pais =

Spanish association football player (1938–2018)

Personal information
- Full name: Antonio Pais Castroagudín
- Date of birth: 7 December 1938
- Place of birth: Padrón, Spain
- Date of death: 13 March 2018 (aged 79)
- Place of death: Santiago de Compostela, Spain
- Position: Midfielder

Youth career
- Arenal Santiago

Senior career*
Years	Team	Apps	(Gls)
- Club Santiago
1959–1961	Celta Vigo	47	(10)
1961–1962	Barcelona	8	(0)
1962–1963	Mallorca	28	(6)
1963–1969	Zaragoza	87	(13)
Total		170+	(29+)
- * Club domestic league appearances and goals

Antonio Pais Castroagudín (7 December 1938 – 13 March 2018) was a Spanish footballer who played as a midfielder.

Having started his career with Celta Vigo in the Segunda División, he played 123 La Liga games and scored 19 goals for Barcelona, Mallorca and Real Zaragoza. He spent six seasons at the last of those clubs, winning the Copa del Generalísimo in 1964 and 1966 and the Inter-Cities Fairs Cup in 1964.

== Career ==
Born in Padrón in the Province of A Coruña, Pais was raised in Santiago de Compostela. His father was a property registrar who disavowed of football as a profession, while his brother was a talented player who dedicated himself to a career in law.

Pais played for Club Arenal de Santiago before having a trial at Deportivo de La Coruña at age 16. He turned down their offer and returned home to play for Club Santiago in the Tercera División.

Pais joined Celta Vigo in April 1959. He arrived at a club that had just been relegated after 15 years in La Liga and became a regular in midfield, playing over 20 games in both of his seasons with 3 and 7 goals respectively, though his club lost the promotion playoffs in each. On 11 June 1961, he equalised in a 2–2 draw with Real Oviedo in the play-off second leg, with the opponents winning promotion on aggregate.

In 1961, Pais transferred to Barcelona on a three-year deal for a fee of 1.8 million Spanish pesetas. Goalkeeper Ramón Allegue Martínez, who knew him since before his professional career, said that the Catalan club was dominated by its local players, likening his situation to contemporary fellow Galician Luis Suárez, whom he considered not to have peaked until he left for Inter Milan. Pais played 13 games for the Camp Nou club, scoring once in his last game on 8 April 1962 to open a 10–1 home win over Basconia in the last-16 second leg of the Copa del Generalísimo.

Pais played the 1962–63 season at Mallorca, having been close to joining Barcelona's city rivals Español. Pais signed for Real Zaragoza in 1963, managed by Antonio Ramallets, who had briefly been his teammate at Barcelona. He formed part of the side known as Los Magníficos in that decade. He totalled 130 games and 15 goals for the Aragonese club in all competitions, winning the domestic cup in 1964 and 1966 plus the Inter-Cities Fairs Cup in 1964.

== Personal life ==
Pais retired in 1969 and on the recommendation of Real Zaragoza's president, entered the steel industry in the city. His wife Consuelo Iglesias had three sons and a daughter, all born in Zaragoza. One son became a journalist and the daughter a doctor, both working in Santiago de Compostela, while the other sons became a lawyer and an executive in Zaragoza.

Pais returned to Santiago de Compostela, where he died aged 79 on 13 March 2018.
