= Luis María Zugazaga =

Spanish association football player

Personal information
- Full name: Luis María Zugazaga Martínez
- Date of birth: 13 October 1944 (age 82)
- Place of birth: Sestao, Spain
- Height: 1.78 m (5 ft 10 in)
- Position: Right back

Senior career*
Years	Team	Apps	(Gls)
1964–1965	Bilbao Athletic		
1965–1971	Athletic Bilbao	63	(0)
1971–1974	Deportivo de La Coruña	78	(0)
1974–1975	Palencia		
Total		141+	(0+)
- * Club domestic league appearances and goals

Luis María Zugazaga Martínez (born 13 October 1944) is a Spanish former footballer who played as a right back. He made 118 La Liga appearances for Atlético Bilbao and Deportivo de La Coruña from 1965 to 1974. For 23 years from 1979, he worked in Athletic's youth ranks.

== Career ==
Born in Sestao in the Basque Country, Zugazaga came through the youth ranks of nearby Atlético Bilbao. He made the first of 101 appearances for the club in a La Liga game away to Atlético Madrid on 14 February 1965, a 2–0 loss. He played the Copa del Generalísimo final in 1966 and 1967, losing to Real Zaragoza and Valencia, respectively.

On 21 February 1971, Zugazaga played for the unofficial Basque Country national football team in a 2–1 loss to Catalonia at his club ground of San Mamés. The game was in memorial to Bilbao-born referee Juan Gardeazábal.

In July 1971, Zugazaga was confirmed as the only player to be leaving the club, after nine years at the establishment. He signed for Deportivo de La Coruña, again in the top flight. In 1974, after playing his final season for the Galicians in the Segunda División, he signed for Tercera División club Palencia.

Zugazaga returned to Athletic Bilbao in 1979, being made assistant manager in the youth teams. He formed an alliance with academy director Jesús Rentería and first-team manager Howard Kendall in the 1980s, contributed to the signing of Carlos Merino from Nottingham Forest in 2000, and remained at the club until June 2002.
