= José Argoitia =

Spanish footballer (1940–2025)

José María Argoitia
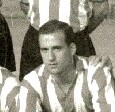
- Argoitia in 1965

Personal information
- Full name: José María Argoitia Acha
- Date of birth: 18 January 1940
- Place of birth: Galdakao, Spain
- Date of death: 24 October 2025 (aged 85)
- Height: 1.77 m (5 ft 10 in)
- Position: Forward

Senior career*
Years	Team	Apps	(Gls)
1957–1960	Basconia	46	(9)
1960–1972	Athletic Bilbao	231	(52)
1962	→ Indautxu (loan)	9	(3)
1972–1973	Sestao	26	(9)
1973	Racing Santander	5	(0)
Total		317	(73)
- * Club domestic league appearances and goals

José María Argoitia Acha (18 January 1940 – 24 October 2025) was a Spanish footballer who played as a forward.

== Career ==
Born in Galdakao, Biscay, Argoitia joined Athletic Bilbao in 1960, from Basque neighbours CD Basconia. He made his La Liga debut on 2 October in a 1–3 away loss against Sevilla FC, and spent a total of 12 seasons with the club, appearing in 308 official games and scoring 70 goals.

Argoitia's best input with the Lions came in the 1966–67 campaign, when he netted 11 times in 22 appearances to help his team to the seventh position. He retired in 1973 at the age of 33, after splitting 1972–73 with Sestao Sport Club in the lower leagues and Racing de Santander in Segunda División.

Argoitia popularized a dribble move known as the Diabolo.

While playing for Athletic Bilbao, Argoitia scored a highly-controversial goal, known as the telegol, against UD Las Palmas during the 1970–71 La Liga season. At the second-half restart, Argoitia immediately ran towards the opponent's end of the field where he left the field near their goalpost. After a teammate sent the ball into Las Palmas' goal area, and the goalkeeper was unable to collect it, Las Palmas defender Martín Marrero attempted to clear the ball. However, at this point, Argoitia re-entered the field and snatched the ball into the net for the only goal of the match. Las Palmas protested the goal, believing it was a violation of the offside rule, and ultimately the International Football Association Board added a clarification which prohibited an attacking player from leaving the field of play without the referee's permission to avoid violating the offside rule.

== Death ==
Argoitia died on 24 October 2025, at the age of 85.

== Honours ==
Athletic Bilbao

- Copa del Generalísimo: 1969
