= Estadio de La Cartuja =

Stadium in Seville, Spain

Coordinates: 37°25′2.05″N 6°0′16.43″W

Estadio La Cartuja
- La Cartuja

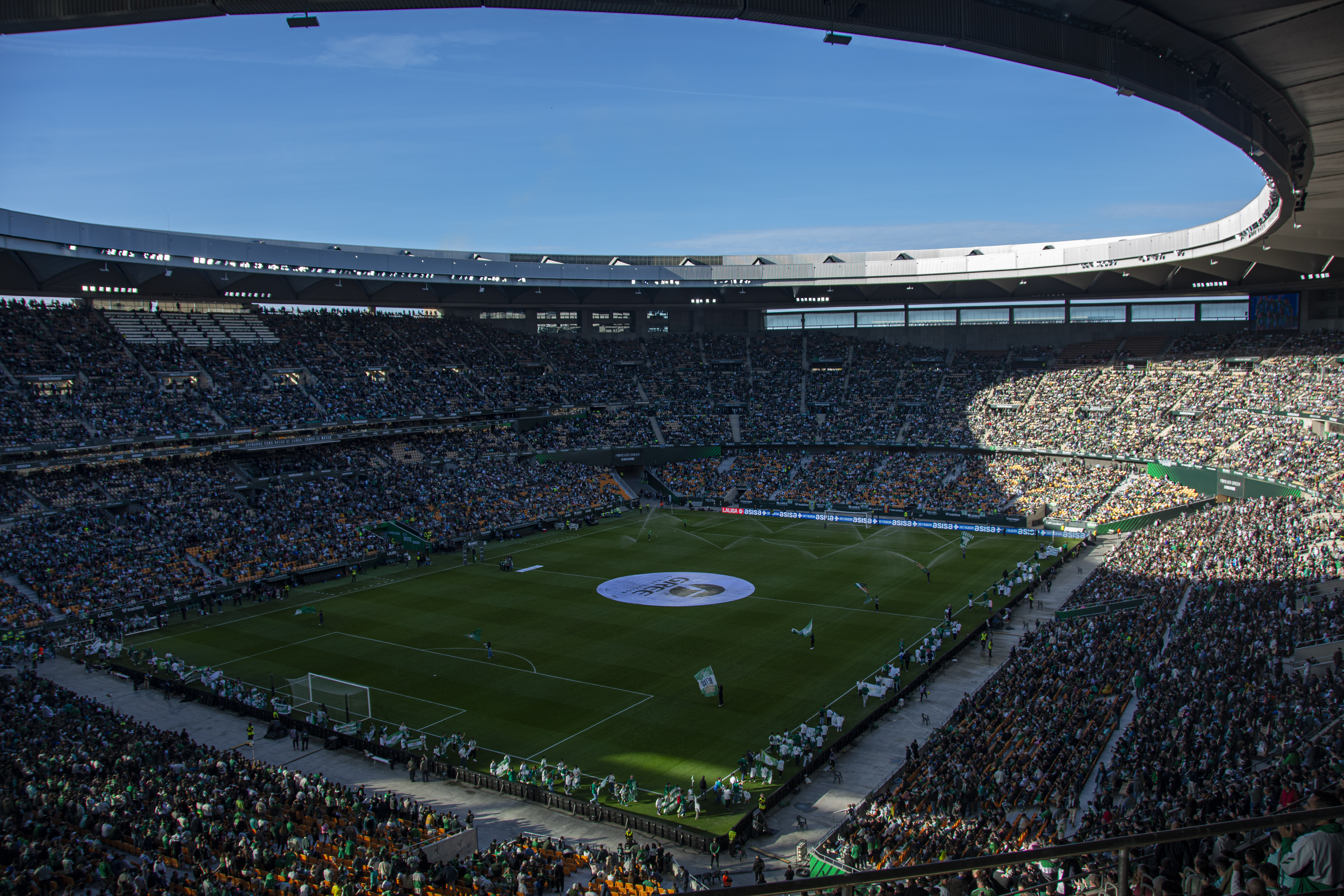
- UEFA
- Interactive map of Estadio La Cartuja
- Full name: Estadio La Cartuja de Sevilla
- Former names: Estadio Olímpico de Sevilla
- Location: Seville, Spain
- Owner: Regional Government of Andalusia (40%); Spanish Government (25%); Seville City Council (19%); Provincial Deputation of Seville (13%); Real Betis (1.5%); Sevilla (1.5%)
- Operator: Sociedad Estadio Olímpico de Sevilla S.A.
- Capacity: 71,374
- Surface: Grass
- Field size: 105 x 68 m

Construction
- Groundbreaking: 1997
- Opened: 5 May 1999
- Expanded: 2025
- Cost: €120 million
- Architects: Antonio Cruz Villalón; Antonio Ortiz García

Tenants
- Spain national football team Real Betis (2025–present)

Estadio La Cartuja (Spanish pronunciation: [esˈta.ðjo la kaɾˈtu.xa]), formerly Estadio Olímpico de Sevilla, officially known as Estadio La Cartuja de Sevilla, is a stadium situated in the Isla de La Cartuja in Seville, Spain. It is used mostly for football and it is commonly referred to as simply 'La Cartuja'. It was completed in 1999 for the World Championships in Athletics and expanded in 2025. With a capacity of 71,374 seats, La Cartuja is the third-largest stadium in Spain and the largest in Andalusia. It was the venue for the 2003 UEFA Cup final between Celtic and Porto.

The stadium is currently the temporary home of Seville-based club Real Betis during the renovation of their own stadium, Estadio Benito Villamarín.

== History ==
The stadium was one of those included in the Seville bids for the 2004 and 2008 Summer Olympics. After the failure of the last bid, the stadium remained unused by either of Seville's major football teams as both Real Betis and Sevilla continued to use their own stadiums. However, both teams expressed their intention to move temporarily while their respective home grounds were renovated.

The stadium is currently managed by the Sociedad Estadio Olímpico de Sevilla S.A., participated by the Regional Government of Andalusia (40% ownership), the Spanish Government (25%); Seville City Council (19%), Seville Congress of Deputies (13%) and the remaining 3% shared evenly between Real Betis and Sevilla.

The Spain national football team occasionally use the stadium for home games, last playing there in 2023. The stadium has previously hosted the final of the Copa del Rey. Real Betis's home game against Villarreal on 31 March 2007 also took place here following a temporary ban from the Manuel Ruiz de Lopera.

The Royal Spanish Tennis Federation has chosen it twice to host the Davis Cup final, in 2004 and 2011. On both occasions, a temporary roof was installed on one side of the stadium, where the clay court was placed.

On 5 February 2020, the stadium was chosen by the Royal Spanish Football Federation to host four Copa del Rey finals from 2021 to 2024.

On 23 April 2021, it was announced that the stadium would replace the San Mamés Stadium in Bilbao as a host stadium for UEFA Euro 2020, which was unable to fulfill its original hosting duties due to the COVID-19 pandemic. During the tournament, and as part of the UEFA Festival, Seville was illuminated at night with a light show across the cityscape.

In 2025, La Cartuja was expanded to 71,374 seats, along with the removal of the athletics track; it was re-inaugurated on 26 April for the 2025 Copa del Rey final. The new capacity made it the third biggest stadium in Spain, after the Camp Nou and the Santiago Bernabéu, with the overall renovation project – including access improvements and a glass roof – to be completed around 2028 in advance of it staging matches at the 2030 FIFA World Cup.

== International matches ==
Date	Competition	Match	Result	Attendance
5 May 1999	Friendly (inauguration)	Spain vs Croatia	3–1	
17 November 1999	Friendly	Spain vs Argentina	0–2	41,000
15 November 2000	Friendly	Spain vs Netherlands	1–2	43,000
3 June 2012	Friendly	Spain vs China	1–0	48,000
17 November 2020	UEFA Nations League	Spain vs Germany	6–0	0
31 March 2021	2022 FIFA World; Cup qualification	Spain vs Kosovo	3–1	0
14 June 2021	UEFA Euro 2020 Group E	Spain vs Sweden	0–0	10,559
19 June 2021	UEFA Euro 2020 Group E	Spain vs Poland	1–1	11,742
23 June 2021	UEFA Euro 2020 Group E	Slovakia vs Spain	0–5	11,204
27 June 2021	UEFA Euro 2020 Round of 16	Belgium vs Portugal	1–0	11,504
14 November 2021	2022 FIFA World; Cup qualification	Spain vs Sweden	1–0	51,844
12 October 2023	UEFA Euro 2024 qualifying Group A	Spain vs Scotland	2–0	45,623
18 November 2025	2026 FIFA World; Cup qualification	Spain vs Turkey	2–2	30,812

=== 2024 UEFA Women's Nations League Finals ===
The stadium was one of three selected to host the 2024 UEFA Women's Nations League Finals matches. It hosted 2 matches.

Date	Team No. 1	Result	Team No. 2	Round
23 February 2024	Spain	3–0	Netherlands	Semi-finals
28 February 2024	Spain	2–0	France	Final

== Notable music events ==
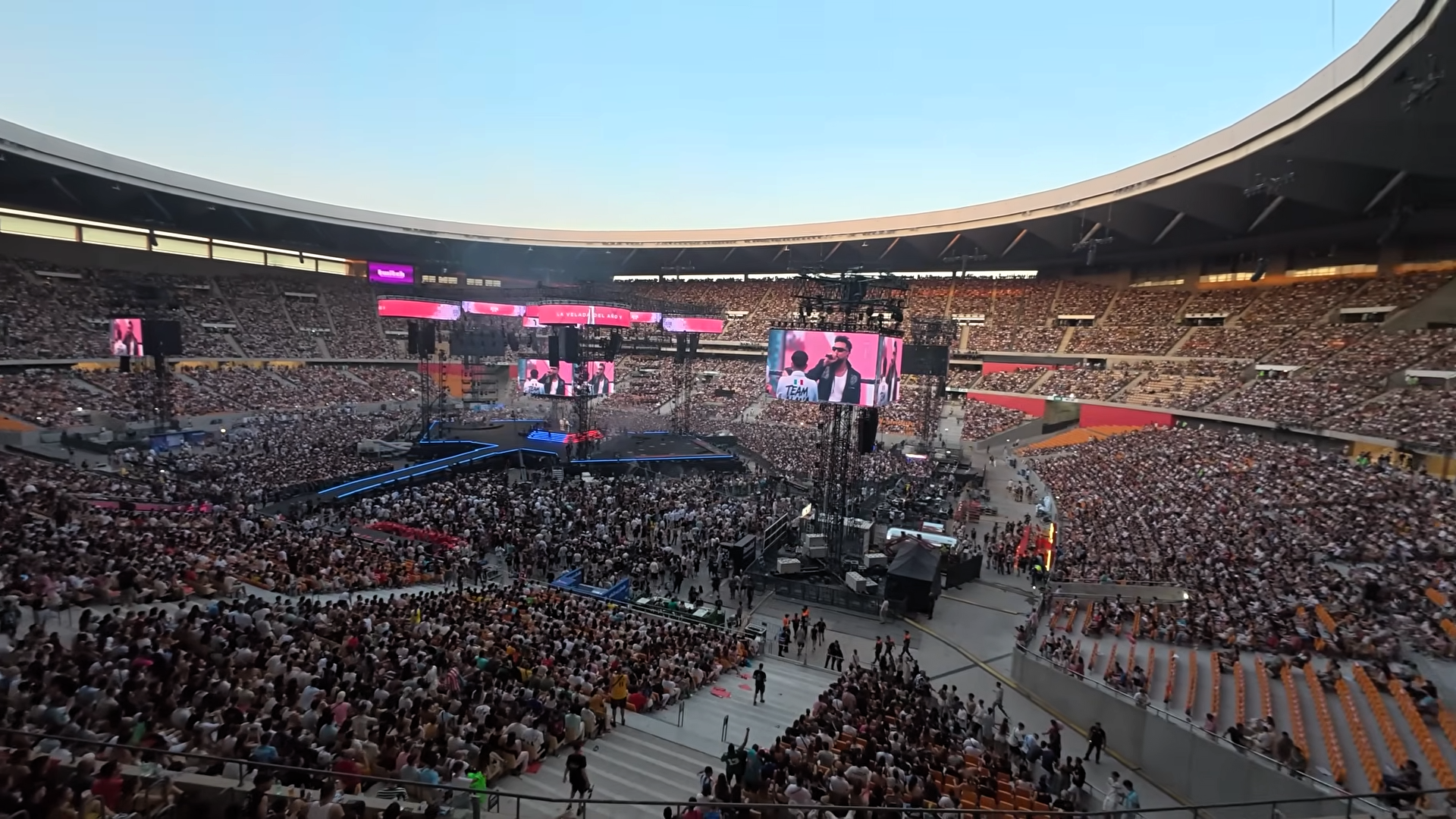
The interior of the stadium during La Velada del Año 5

On 9 October 1999, Mexican singer Luis Miguel performed a concert at the Stadium in front of 35,000 spectators during his Amarte Es Un Placer Tour.

On 16 September 2008, American entertainer Madonna played a concert in front of 47,712 spectators during her Sticky & Sweet Tour.

U2 performed at the stadium on 30 September 2010 during their U2 360° Tour, in front of a sold-out crowd of 76,159 people.

Depeche Mode were scheduled to perform at the stadium on 12 July 2009 as part of their Tour of the Universe, but the concert was cancelled due to singer Dave Gahan's leg injury.

Bruce Springsteen performed at the stadium on 13 May 2012 as part of his Wrecking Ball World Tour.

AC/DC performed here on 10 May 2016 as part of their Rock or Bust World Tour in front of 60,000 people, and returned in 2024 with the Power Up Tour.

Red Hot Chili Peppers opened their 2022 Global Stadium Tour at the stadium on 4 June 2022.

Manuel Carrasco broke the record for most attended single-day concert in Spain's history on 11 June 2022, with 74,345 tickets sold.

== See also ==
- Lists of stadiums

Preceded by Olympic Stadium; Athens	IAAF World Championships in Athletics; Main venue 1999	Succeeded by Commonwealth Stadium; Edmonton
Preceded by De Kuip; Rotterdam	UEFA Cup; Final venue 2003	Succeeded by Ullevi; Gothenburg
Preceded by Rod Laver Arena; Melbourne	Davis Cup; Final venue 2004	Succeeded by Sibamac Arena; Bratislava
Preceded by Belgrade Arena; Belgrade	Davis Cup; Final venue 2011	Succeeded by O2 Arena; Prague
