= Ramón Montesinos =

Spanish footballer

Personal information
- Full name: Ramón Montesinos Calaf
- Date of birth: 31 May 1943
- Place of birth: Barcelona, Spain
- Date of death: 29 December 2010 (aged 67)
- Place of death: Alella, Spain
- Height: 1.72 m (5 ft 7 1/2 in)
- Position: Midfielder

Youth career
- Barcelona

Senior career*
Years	Team	Apps	(Gls)
1962–1963	Condal		
1963–1967	Barcelona	39	(1)
1963	→ Racing Santander (loan)	5	(1)
1964–1965	→ Osasuna (loan)	26	(3)
1968–1974	Sabadell	206	(7)
1976–1979	Sants		

International career
1961	Spain U18	3	(0)
1963–1964	Spain amateur	8	(0)
1971	Catalonia	1	(0)
- * Club domestic league appearances and goals

Ramón Montesinos Calaf (31 May 1943 – 29 December 2010) was a Spanish footballer who played as a defensive midfielder.

== Club career ==
Born in Barcelona, Catalonia, Montesinos joined local and La Liga powerhouse FC Barcelona in the summer of 1963, having already played his youth football there. During his three-year spell with the club he was sparingly used, his best output being 19 games in precisely his first year, and he was also loaned to CA Osasuna in Segunda División whilst under contract.

In 1965–66, as Barça won the Inter-Cities Fairs Cup, Montesinos appeared more in that competition (eight games) than in the domestic league (six). In 1967, he signed for neighbouring CE Sabadell FC where he would remain for the rest of his professional career, his first five seasons being played in the top flight – this included the 1968–69 campaign where he played all the matches and minutes as the team finished in a best-ever fourth position; at the time of his retirement, he was the Arlequinats' joint-second player with the most appearances in the competition at 141.

== Death ==
Montesinos died in the village of Alella on 29 December 2010, at the age of 67.

== Honours ==
Barcelona

- Inter-Cities Fairs Cup: 1965–66
