= José Luis Violeta =

Spanish footballer (1941–2022)

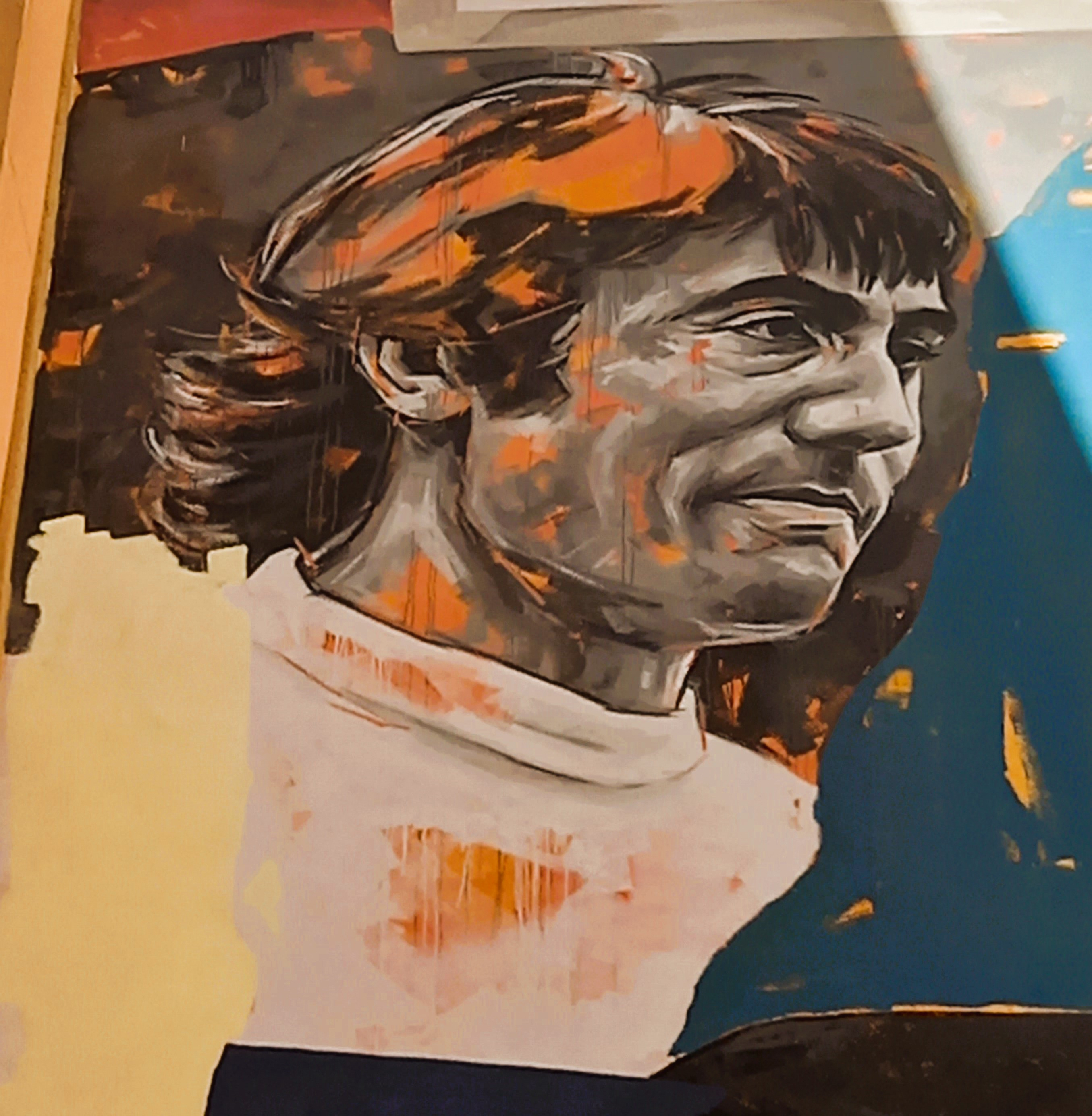
- Mural of Violeta

Personal information
- Full name: José Luis Violeta Lajusticia
- Date of birth: 25 February 1941
- Place of birth: Zaragoza, Spain
- Date of death: 5 May 2022 (aged 81)
- Height: 1.75 m (5 ft 9 in)
- Position: Midfielder

Senior career*
| Years | Team | Apps | (Gls) |
| 1961–1977 | Zaragoza | 365 | (19) |

International career
| 1966–1973 | Spain | 14 | (1) |
- * Club domestic league appearances and goals

José Luis Violeta Lajusticia (25 February 1941 – 5 May 2022) was a Spanish footballer who played as a midfielder for Real Zaragoza and the Spain national team.

Violeta played in Real Zaragoza for fourteen seasons, helping the club to victory in the 1964 and 1966 Copa del Generalísimo Finals. Violeta made 473 official appearances for Real Zaragoza, making him the club's joint all-time leading player.

Violeta made fourteen appearances for the Spain national team.

== Honours ==
Zaragoza

- Inter-Cities Fairs Cup: 1963–64
- Copa del Generalísimo: 1963–64, 1965–66
