= Enrique Yarza =

Spanish footballer

Personal information
- Full name: Enrique Yarza Soraluce
- Date of birth: 21 October 1930
- Place of birth: San Sebastián, Spain
- Date of death: 1 August 2001 (aged 70)
- Place of death: San Sebastián, Spain
- Height: 1.73 m (5 ft 8 in)
- Position: Goalkeeper

Senior career*
Years	Team	Apps	(Gls)
1948–1950	Celta Zaragoza		
1951–1952	Fuenclara		
1952–1953	Arenas Zaragoza		
1953–1969	Real Zaragoza	254	(0)
Total		254+	(0)
- * Club domestic league appearances and goals

Enrique Yarza Soraluce (21 October 1930 – 1 August 2001) was a Spanish footballer who played as a goalkeeper.

After his university studies and military service, he spent his entire professional career at Real Zaragoza, playing 332 games across all competitions from 1953 to 1969. He was the club's most successful captain, winning the Copa del Generalísimo in 1964 and 1966, and the Inter-Cities Fairs Cup in 1964.

== Early life ==
Born to a well-off family in San Sebastián in the Basque Country, Yarza excelled academically, in 1948 he joined the Faculty of Chemical Sciences at the University of Zaragoza. During this time, he played as a left winger and took penalty kicks for a university team touring the local area.

Yarza's performances for the university team earned him attention from clubs, and he signed for regional first division side Celta de Zaragoza, whom he helped to promotion to the Tercera División. During this time, he was conscripted for compulsory military service in Tarragona, which was spread out due to his university course; he rose to the rank of reserve second lieutenant.

Club Deportivo Fuenclara then signed Yarza, who moved on to Arenas de Zaragoza in a deal that would see Celta de Zaragoza have access to the latter club's facilities. Arenas de Zaragoza had connections with professional club Real Valladolid, but Yarza had instead committed to Real Zaragoza despite only being offered half as much salary there.

== Career ==
Yarza arrived at a Real Zaragoza side in the Segunda División, and made his debut on 13 September 1953 as the season began with a 3–2 loss away to Baracaldo. On 3 October 1954, he scored an own goal and made several errors in a 4–2 home loss to Cultural Leonesa on the fourth matchday, leading to criticism from journalists who highlighted his comparatively short height for a goalkeeper of 1.73 m. He asked manager Edmundo Suárez for a break and was subsequently replaced by Pedro de las Heras Martínez, known as Lasheras.

Yarza did not recover a place in the team until 1959–60, with the team now in La Liga. The return of Suárez to the bench and frustration around Lasheras's failed negotiations with Real Madrid gave an opportunity to the 29-year-old. He captained the team in the Copa del Generalísimo final on 23 June 1963, a 3–1 loss to Barcelona at the Camp Nou.

Real Zaragoza won their first trophy on 24 June 1964, lifting the Inter-Cities Fairs Cup with a 2–1 final win over compatriots Valencia. This was followed on 5 July with the Copa del Generalísimo, after defeating Atlético Madrid 2–1 in the final. With another domestic cup win two years later against Atlético Bilbao, he was the club's most successful captain of all time. In September 1966, the team lost the Fairs Cup final to Barcelona; having won 1–0 away in the first leg, Real Zaragoza fell 4–2 after extra time at La Romareda in the second leg, with Lluís Pujol scoring a hat-trick against Yarza. The Real Zaragoza side of this decade were known as Los Magníficos.

Limited by an Achilles tendon rupture in his later career, Yarza played his final match aged 39 on 18 September 1968, a 3–1 loss away to Trakia Plovdiv of Bulgaria in the first round of the Fairs Cup, and was criticised by the press for his performance. Having played under four presidents and 16 managers, he was given a testimonial match on 1 May 1969 against Wiener Sport-Club of Austria.

Yarza was never called up by the Spain national football team, in an era when José Ángel Iribar was the dominant goalkeeper. He was called up to the B-team in 1960, but was not capped.

== Later life and death ==
Yarza returned to his hometown after football, and ran a bar with Zaragoza teammate Paco Santamaría. He died of liver cancer on 1 August 2001, aged 70.
