= Luis Belló =

Spanish footballer and manager (1929–2021)

Belló
Personal information
- Full name: Luis Belló Martínez
- Date of birth: 7 January 1929
- Place of birth: Cieza, Spain
- Date of death: 3 October 2021 (aged 92)
- Place of death: Zaragoza, Spain
- Position: Midfielder

Youth career
- Cieza

Senior career*
Years	Team	Apps	(Gls)
194?–194?	Cieza		
194?–194?	Albacete		
1950–1953	Zaragoza		
1954–1956	Hércules		
1958–1959	Cieza		
1959–1960	Amistad Zaragoza		

Managerial career
- 1964: Zaragoza
- 1965–1966: Hércules
- 1966–1967: Betis
- 1967–1968: Castellón
- 1968–1969: Pontevedra
- 1969: Murcia
- 197?–197?: Cartagena
- * Club domestic league appearances and goals

Luis Belló Martínez also known as Belló II (7 January 1929 – 3 October 2021) was a Spanish football player and manager.

== Playing career ==
From 1949 to 1958, Belló played top-flight professional football, mostly with the Spanish teams Real Zaragoza and Hércules CF. From 1961 to 1965, he was the sports director of Zaragoza. In 1964, when he was the coach after the sacking of Ramallets, Belló won the domestic Cup and the Inter-Cities Fairs Cup. The 1968–69 season, as coach of Pontevedra CF, was his only season coaching a team in the top division.
