= 1988 Ballon d'Or =

Annual association football award event in France

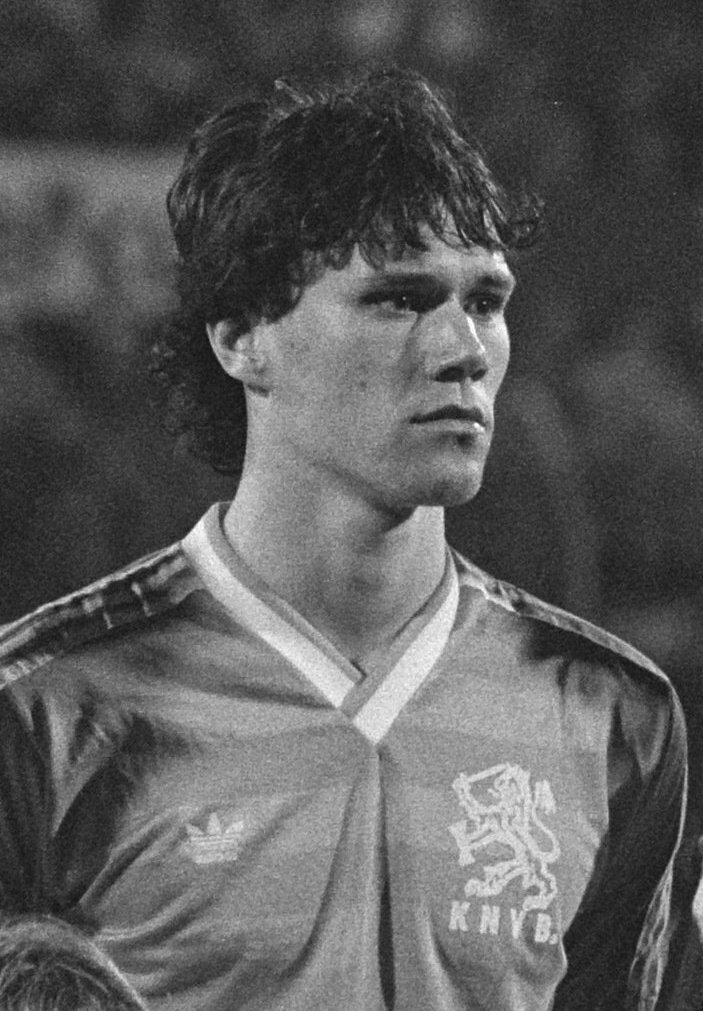
- 1988 Ballon d'Or winner, Marco van Basten
- Date: 27 December 1988
- Presented by: France Football

Highlights
- Won by: (Netherlands) Marco Van Basten (1st award)
- Website: ballondor.com

The 1988 Ballon d'Or, given to the best football player in Europe as judged by a panel of sports journalists from UEFA member countries, was awarded to Marco van Basten on 27 December 1988. There were 27 voters, from Albania, Austria, Belgium, Bulgaria, Czechoslovakia, Denmark, East Germany, England, Finland, France, Greece, Hungary, Italy, Luxembourg, the Netherlands, Poland, Portugal, Republic of Ireland, Romania, Scotland, Soviet Union, Spain, Sweden, Switzerland, Turkey, West Germany and Yugoslavia. Van Basten was the third Dutch national to win the award after Johan Cruyff (1971, 1973, 1974) and Ruud Gullit (1987).

== Rankings ==
| Rank | Name | Club(s) | Nationality | Points |
|---|---|---|---|---|
| 1 | Marco van Basten | (Italy) Milan | Netherlands | 129 |
| 2 | Ruud Gullit | (Italy) Milan | Netherlands | 88 |
| 3 | Frank Rijkaard | (Italy) Milan | Netherlands | 45 |
| 4 | Oleksiy Mykhaylychenko | (Soviet Union) Dynamo Kyiv | Soviet Union | 41 |
| 5 | Ronald Koeman | (Netherlands) PSV Eindhoven | Netherlands | 39 |
| 6 | Lothar Matthäus | (Italy) Internazionale | West Germany | 10 |
| 7 | Gianluca Vialli | (Italy) Sampdoria | Italy | 7 |
| 8 | Franco Baresi | (Italy) Milan | Italy | 5 |
| 8 | Jürgen Klinsmann | (West Germany) VfB Stuttgart | West Germany | 5 |
| 8 | Oleksandr Zavarov | (Italy) Juventus | Soviet Union | 5 |
| 11 | Tanju Çolak | (Turkey) Galatasaray | Turkey | 4 |
| 11 | Oleh Kuznetsov | (Soviet Union) Dynamo Kyiv | Soviet Union | 4 |
| 13 | Rinat Dasayev | (Spain) Sevilla | Soviet Union | 3 |
| 13 | Anatoliy Demyanenko | (Soviet Union) Dynamo Kyiv | Soviet Union | 3 |
| 13 | Glenn Hysén | (Italy) Fiorentina | Sweden | 3 |
| 13 | Míchel | (Spain) Real Madrid | Spain | 3 |
| 17 | Flemming Povlsen | (West Germany) 1. FC Köln | Denmark | 2 |
| 17 | Michel Preud'homme | (Belgium) Mechelen | Belgium | 2 |
| 17 | Walter Zenga | (Italy) Internazionale | Italy | 2 |
| 20 | Gheorghe Hagi | (Romania) Steaua București | Romania | 1 |
| 20 | Roberto Mancini | (Italy) Sampdoria | Italy | 1 |
| 20 | Dejan Savićević | (Socialist Federal Republic of Yugoslavia) Red Star Belgrade | Yugoslavia | 1 |
| 20 | Neville Southall | (England) Everton | Wales | 1 |
| 20 | Dragan Stojković | (Socialist Federal Republic of Yugoslavia) Red Star Belgrade | Yugoslavia | 1 |
