= Enrique Collar =

Spanish footballer (1934–2025)

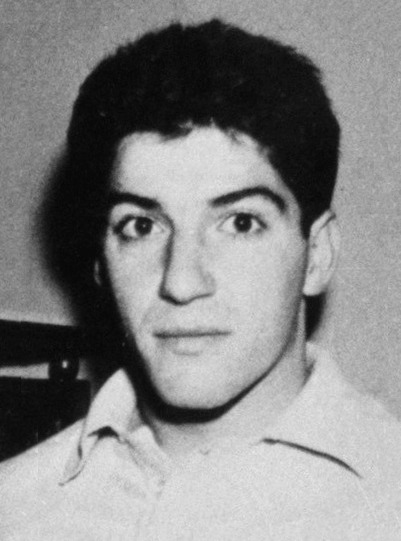
- Collar in 1962

Personal information
- Full name: Enrique Collar Monterrubio
- Date of birth: 2 November 1934
- Place of birth: San Juan de Aznalfarache, Spain
- Date of death: 29 December 2025 (aged 91)
- Position: Left winger

Youth career
- Imperial
- Peña Norit
- 1949–1952: Atlético Madrid

Senior career*
Years	Team	Apps	(Gls)
1952–1969	Atlético Madrid	339	(71)
1952–1953	→ Cádiz (loan)	20	(7)
1954	→ Murcia (loan)	11	(7)
1969–1970	Valencia	15	(1)
Total		385	(86)

International career
1952	Spain U18	2	(1)
1955–1959	Spain B	7	(1)
1955–1963	Spain	16	(5)
- * Club domestic league appearances and goals

Enrique Collar Monterrubio (2 November 1934 – 29 December 2025) was a Spanish professional footballer who played as a left winger.

He spent most of his career with Atlético Madrid, playing 470 games and scoring 105 goals over all competitions, as well as being captain from 1960 to 1969. He won one La Liga title, three Copa del Generalísimo titles and the European Cup-Winners' Cup. He retired in 1970 after one season at Valencia.

Collar earned 16 caps and scored five goals for the Spain national team from 1955 to 1963. He played in the 1962 FIFA World Cup.

== Early life ==
Collar was born in San Juan de Aznalfarache in the Province of Seville, to a father from Tomelloso in the Province of Ciudad Real, and a mother from Bilbao. He was one of four sons and two daughters.

Collar began playing football for Imperial in his hometown, and when he was 12 his father moved the family to Madrid due to his banking job. Collar continued playing Peña Norit in the capital city and then the youth teams of Atlético Madrid in 1949. He went to a trial for Atlético with his brothers Antonio and Pepe and barely touched the ball in the practice match, but was asked to demonstrate a corner kick and then assigned to the team. With the team, he won a national youth title in 1952.

== Club career ==
After turning 18, Collar signed his first professional contract on 3 November and was loaned to Cádiz in the Tercera División for the season. All four of the Collar brothers played for Cádiz at the same time. On 13 September 1953, he made his Atlético debut as the season opened with a home game against Espanyol, but he played only five league games and two in the cup over the entire season. He had another loan for the first half of 1954–55, scoring 7 goals in 11 games for a Real Murcia side that ended the season promoted as champions.

After his loans, Collar became a regular at Atlético Madrid, forming the Ala infernal (Wing of Hell) with his friend Joaquín Peiró. The nickname was given by opponents in Brazil, and the pair played together between 1956 and Peiró's sale to Torino in 1963. Collar was the first of several Atlético players to be nicknamed El Niño (The Kid), a moniker later given to fellow youth team graduates Carlos Aguilera and Fernando Torres.

Collar was Atlético captain from 1960 to 1969, which by the time of his death was the longest captaincy in the club's history. During this period, the club won La Liga (1965–66), the Copa del Generalísimo (1960, 1961, 1965) and the European Cup Winners' Cup (1962). He played 470 games in all competitions for Atlético – joint fifth at the time of his death with current player Antoine Griezmann – and scored 105 goals.

Collar played his final season for Valencia in 1969–70. On 28 May 1972, Atlético held a testimonial match for him against Bayern Munich.

== International career ==
Collar played 16 games and scored 5 goals for Spain, having scored on his debut on 19 June 1955 in a 3–0 friendly win against Switzerland in Geneva. On 23 November 1961, he was captain and scored the decisive goal of a 3–2 win over Morocco in the 1962 FIFA World Cup qualification play-offs, and he was chosen for the final tournament in Chile. His last game on 30 May 1963 was a 1–1 draw with Northern Ireland in Bilbao in 1964 European Nations' Cup qualifying; he was not chosen for the final event which Spain won on home soil.

== Personal life and death ==
Collar appeared as himself in the 1960 film The Economically Handicapped, a comedy themed around football.

Collar was president of Atlético Madrid's charitable foundation until 2011. He lived his final years with Alzheimer's disease. His son told the programme El día después in 2023 that his father was unaware of his own identity and was largely non-verbal, but could recognise Atlético Madrid's badge and kit.

In December 2023, the town council in Collar's birthplace of San Juan de Aznalfarache renamed the local football stadium in his honour.

Collar died on 29 December 2025, at the age of 91.

== Career statistics ==
Scores and results list Spain's goal tally first, score column indicates score after each Collar goal.

List of international goals scored by Enrique Collar
No.	Date	Venue	Opponent	Score	Result	Competition
1	19 June 1955	Charmilles, Geneva, Switzerland	Switzerland	1–0	3–0	Friendly
2	13 March 1958	Parc des Princes, Paris, France	France	2–1	2–2	Friendly
3	14 July 1960	Nacional, Santiago, Chile	Chile	3–0	4–0	Friendly
4	23 November 1961	Santiago Bernabéu Stadium, Madrid, Spain	Morocco	3–1	3–2	1962 FIFA World Cup qualification
5	1 November 1962	Santiago Bernabéu Stadium, Madrid, Spain	Romania	3–0	6–0	1964 European Nations' Cup qualifying

== Honours ==
Murcia

- Segunda Division: 1954–55

Atlético Madrid

- UEFA Cup Winners' Cup: 1961–62
- La Liga: 1965–66
- Copa del Generalísimo: 1959–60, 1960–61, 1964–65
