= SD Indautxu =

Indautxu
- Full name: Sociedad Deportiva Indautxu
- Founded: 1924
- Ground: Iparralde, Bilbao, Biscay, Spain
- Chairman: Fidel Olozaga
- Manager: Juan Pablo Palacio
- League: División de Honor
- 2024–25: División de Honor, 13th of 18
Home colours	Away colours

Sociedad Deportiva Indautxu is a Spanish football club based in Bilbao, in the autonomous community of Basque Country. Founded in 1924, it plays in División de Honor, holding home games at Campo Iparralde.

Apart from football, the club also promotes other sports such as boxing and swimming.

== History ==
Indautxu was founded in 1924, was disbanded in 1929, and then reformed in 1940, also being referred to as Sociedad Deportiva Indauchu.

In 1955–56's second division, with former Athletic Bilbao players Telmo Zarra and José Luis Panizo in the squad, and with another, Rafael Iriondo, as coach, the team made its debuts in the Spanish second division, finishing third in 1956–57 and 1958–59, and fourth in 1957–58.

Indautxu maintained its division status until the Segunda Division status until the 1966–67 season, returning for the last time in 1968–69, and meeting the same fate.

== Season to season ==
Season	Tier	Division	Place	Copa del Rey
1940–41	6	2ª Reg.	1st	
1941–42	3	1ª Reg. A	1st	
1942–43	3	1ª Reg. A	4th	
1943–44	3	3ª	3rd	Third round
1944–45	3	3ª	4th	
1945–46	3	3ª	4th	
1946–47	3	3ª	2nd	
1947–48	3	3ª	9th	First round
1948–49	3	3ª	6th	Third round
1949–50	3	3ª	8th	
1950–51	3	3ª	5th	
1951–52	3	3ª	15th	
1952–53	3	3ª	9th	
1953–54	3	3ª	9th	
1954–55	3	3ª	2nd	
1955–56	2	2ª	8th	
1956–57	2	2ª	3rd	
1957–58	2	2ª	4th	
1958–59	2	2ª	3rd	Round of 32
1959–60	2	2ª	8th	Round of 32

Season	Tier	Division	Place	Copa del Rey
1960–61	2	2ª	11th	First round
1961–62	2	2ª	14th	First round
1962–63	2	2ª	9th	Preliminary
1963–64	2	2ª	12th	Round of 32
1964–65	2	2ª	8th	Preliminary
1965–66	2	2ª	6th	Round of 32
1966–67	2	2ª	16th	Preliminary
1967–68	3	3ª	1st	
1968–69	2	2ª	19th	
1969–70	3	3ª	10th	First round
1970–71	4	Reg. Pref.	15th	
1971–72	4	Reg. Pref.	20th	
1972–73	5	1ª Reg.	10th	
1973–74	5	1ª Reg.	7th	
1974–75	5	1ª Reg.	7th	
1975–76	5	1ª Reg.	7th	
1976–77	5	1ª Reg.	8th	
1977–78	6	1ª Reg.	14th	
1978–79	6	1ª Reg.	3rd	
1979–80	5	Reg. Pref.	10th	

Season	Tier	Division	Place	Copa del Rey
1980–81	5	Reg. Pref.	16th	
1981–82	5	Reg. Pref.	15th	
1982–83	5	Reg. Pref.	14th	
1983–84	5	Reg. Pref.	16th	
1984–85	5	Reg. Pref.	13th	
1985–86	5	Reg. Pref.	15th	
1986–87	5	Reg. Pref.	7th	
1987–88	5	Reg. Pref.	16th	
1988–89	6	1ª Reg.	1st	
1989–90	5	Reg. Pref.	5th	
1990–91	5	Terr. Pref.	8th	
1991–92	5	Terr. Pref.	7th	
1992–93	5	Terr. Pref.	3rd	
1993–94	5	Terr. Pref.	11th	
1994–95	5	Terr. Pref.	8th	
1995–96	5	Terr. Pref.	16th	
1996–97	5	Terr. Pref.	8th	
1997–98	5	Terr. Pref.	11th	
1998–99	5	Terr. Pref.	17th	
1999–2000	6	1ª Terr.	2nd	

Season	Tier	Division	Place	Copa del Rey
2000–01	5	Terr. Pref.	6th	
2001–02	5	Terr. Pref.	1st	
2002–03	4	3ª	5th	
2003–04	4	3ª	9th	
2004–05	4	3ª	9th	
2005–06	4	3ª	17th	
2006–07	5	Div. Hon.	17th	
2007–08	6	Pref.	11th	
2008–09	6	Pref.	4th	
2009–10	6	Pref.	1st	
2010–11	5	Div. Hon.	7th	
2011–12	5	Div. Hon.	18th	
2012–13	6	Pref.	14th	
2013–14	6	Pref.	3rd	
2014–15	5	Div. Hon.	18th	
2015–16	6	Pref.	15th	
2016–17	6	Pref.	12th	
2017–18	6	Pref.	5th	
2018–19	6	Pref.	2nd	
2019–20	5	Div. Hon.	15th	

Season	Tier	Division	Place	Copa del Rey
2020–21	5	Div. Hon.	7th	
2021–22	6	Div. Hon.	3rd	
2022–23	6	Div. Hon.	13th	
2023–24	6	Div. Hon.	15th	
2024–25	6	Div. Hon.	13th	
2025–26	6	Div. Hon.		

- 13 seasons in Segunda División
- 18 seasons in Tercera División

== Famous players ==
- (Spain) José Eulogio Gárate
- (Spain) (Equatorial Guinea) (Germany) Unai Laka
- (Spain) Raimundo Lezama
- (Spain) José Luis Panizo
- (Spain) Chus Pereda
- (Spain) Telmo Zarra

== Famous coaches ==
- (Spain) Rafael Iriondo
- (Equatorial Guinea) Serafín González
