= Joaquín Cortizo =

Spanish footballer and manager (1932–2018)

Personal information
- Full name: Joaquín Cortizo Rosendo
- Date of birth: 4 October 1932
- Place of birth: Ribadavia, Spain
- Date of death: 4 January 2018 (aged 85)
- Place of death: Jaén, Spain
- Height: 1.68 m (5 ft 6 in)
- Position: Defender

Senior career*
Years	Team	Apps	(Gls)
1956–1958	Celta	7	(0)
1958–1966	Zaragoza	142	(2)
1966–1968	Jaén	26	(0)
Total		175	(2)

Managerial career
- 1968: Jaén
- * Club domestic league appearances and goals

Joaquín Cortizo Rosendo (4 October 1932 – 4 January 2018) was a Spanish professional footballer who played as a defender.

== Club career ==
Born in Ribadavia, Province of Ourense, Cortizo signed with local RC Celta de Vigo in 1956, aged 24. He only made his La Liga debut on 14 April of the following year, in a 2–1 home win against Valencia CF; he featured sparingly during his spell at Balaídos, notably due to an intestine disease.

In the summer of 1958, Cortizo joined Real Zaragoza. He scored his first goal in the top division on 9 December 1962, but in a 2–4 loss away to Real Madrid; during his five-year tenure he won two Copa del Generalísimo trophies as well as the 1963–64 edition of the Inter-Cities Fairs Cup, being part of the Five Magnificent teams.

On 27 December 1964, Cortizo broke Atlético Madrid player Enrique Collar's leg during a 3–1 victory at La Romareda. Referee Manuel Gómez Arribas did not appreciate any foul at that moment, but the player was eventually handed a 24-match ban by the Royal Spanish Football Federation, which was a national record.

In the 1966 off-season, Cortizo moved to Real Jaén. After retiring and settling in the city, he worked for the club as technical secretary as well as president.

== Death ==
After a long illness, Cortizo died on 4 January 2018 at the age of 85, in Jaén.
