= 1962–63 Copa del Generalísimo =

61st Copa del Rey

Tournament details
- Country: Spain
- Teams: 48

Final positions
- Champions: FC Barcelona (15th title)
- Runners-up: Real Zaragoza CD

Tournament statistics
- Matches played: 107

The 1962–63 Copa del Generalísimo was the 61st staging of the Copa del Rey (King's Cup). The competition began on 25 November 1962 and ended on 23 June 1963 with the final.

== First round ==
Team 1	Agg.	Team 2	1st leg	2nd leg
Cádiz CF	3–3	RCD Español	3–1	0–2
CD Constancia	3–3	Sevilla Atlético	2–1	1–2
Hércules CF	2–0	Celta Vigo	1–0	1–0
Recreativo de Huelva	1–1	Real Gijón	1–0	0–1
SD Indauchu	1–5	CD Eldense	1–0	0–5
Real Jaén	4–3	CD Basconia	2–0	2–3
UP Langreo	1–4	UD Las Palmas	1–1	0–3
Levante UD	4–4	Burgos CF	3–1	1–3
Melilla CF	3–4	CD Alavés	2–0	1–4
Real Murcia	3–1	CD Orense	1–0	2–1
AD Plus Ultra	2–3	Real Sociedad	1–0	1–3
Pontevedra CF	2–3	CD Mestalla	1–1	1–2
CD Sabadell CF	0–6	Granada CF	0–3	0–3
UD Salamanca	4–4	CD San Fernando	4–0	0–4
Real Santander	1–3	Cartagena CF	0–2	1–1
CD Tenerife	3–1	CD Atlético Baleares	3–0	0–1

Source: RSSSF

- Tiebreaker

Team 1	Score	Team 2
Cádiz CF	2–1	RCD Español
CD Constancia	0–0	Sevilla Atlético
Recreativo de Huelva	0–2	Real Gijón
Levante UD	1–0	Burgos CF
UD Salamanca	1–1	CD San Fernando

- Second tiebreaker

Team 1	Score	Team 2
CD Constancia	1–2	Sevilla Atlético
UD Salamanca	1–2	CD San Fernando

== Round of 32 ==
Team 1	Agg.	Team 2	1st leg	2nd leg
CD Alavés	1–2	CD Málaga	1–0	0–2
FC Barcelona	3–2	Real Murcia	3–1	0–1
Cádiz CF	2–5	Córdoba CF	1–2	1–3
CD Cartagena	4–4	Elche CF	2–2	2–2
Deportivo La Coruña	1–1	Levante UD	0–0	1–1
Real Gijón	3–3	Real Valladolid	2–1	1–2
Granada CF	0–6	Real Madrid	0–3	0–3
Hércules CF	2–7	Atlético Madrid	2–3	0–4
UD Las Palmas	1–5	Real Betis	0–1	1–4
CD Mestalla	8–2	RCD Mallorca	3–2	5–0
Real Sociedad	1–4	Real Oviedo	0–3	1–1
Sevilla CF	3–0	Real Jaén	2–0	1–0
Sevilla Atlético	2–7	Club Atlético de Bilbao	0–3	2–4
CD Tenerife	5–4	CA Osasuna	4–2	1–2
Valencia CF	8–2	CD Eldense	8–1	0–1
Real Zaragoza	8–2	CD San Fernando	4–1	4–1

Source: RSSSF

- Tiebreaker

Team 1	Score	Team 2
CD Cartagena	0–1	Elche CF
Deportivo La Coruña	3–1	Levante UD
Real Gijón	1–2	Real Valladolid

== Round of 16 ==
Team 1	Agg.	Team 2	1st leg	2nd leg
Club Atlético de Bilbao	1–1	Real Zaragoza	1–0	0–1
Atlético Madrid	3–0	Córdoba CF	2–0	1–0
Real Betis	3–2	Sevilla CF	2–1	1–1
Elche CF	5–5	CF Barcelona	4–1	1–4
Levante UD	2–7	Real Madrid	1–4	1–3
Real Oviedo	2–4	CD Málaga	1–1	1–3
CD Tenerife	2–3	Valencia CF	1–0	1–3
Real Valladolid	4–2	CD Mestalla	4–1	0–1

Source: RSSSF

- Tiebreaker

Team 1	Score	Team 2
Club Atlético de Bilbao	2–3	Real Zaragoza
Elche CF	1–2	FC Barcelona

== Quarter-finals ==
Team 1	Agg.	Team 2	1st leg	2nd leg
Atlético Madrid	1–2	Real Zaragoza	1–0	0–2
Real Betis	3–3	Real Madrid CF	1–0	2–3
Valencia CF	5–1	CD Málaga	5–1	0–0
Real Valladolid	3–5	FC Barcelona	2–1	1–4

Source: RSSSF

- Tiebreaker

Team 1	Score	Team 2
Real Betis	0–2	Real Madrid CF

== Semi-finals ==
Team 1	Agg.	Team 2	1st leg	2nd leg
Valencia CF	3–3	FC Barcelona	2–2	1–1
Real Zaragoza CD	4–3	Real Madrid CF	4–0	0–3

Source: RSSSF

- Tiebreaker

Team 1	Score	Team 2
Valencia CF	0–1	FC Barcelona

== Final ==
Team 1	Score	Team 2
FC Barcelona	3–1	Real Zaragoza CD

Copa del Generalísimo
winners
FC Barcelona
15th title
