= Eleuterio Santos =

Spanish footballer (1940–2008)

Personal information
- Full name: Eleuterio Santos Brito
- Date of birth: 9 November 1940
- Place of birth: Santa Cruz de Tenerife, Spain
- Date of death: 28 January 2008 (aged 67)
- Place of death: Santa Cruz de Tenerife, Spain
- Position: Midfielder

Youth career
- Prosperidad
- Tarrasa
- Unión Tenerife

Senior career*
| Years | Team | Apps | (Gls) |
| 1959–1963 | Tenerife | 74 | (26) |
| 1963–1972 | Zaragoza | 199 | (54) |
| 1972–1975 | Tudelano | | |
| Total | | 273+ | (80+) |

International career
| 1968 | Spain | 1 | (0) |
- * Club domestic league appearances and goals

Eleuterio Santos Brito (9 November 1940 – 28 January 2008) was a Spanish footballer who played as a midfielder.

He spent the vast majority of his professional career with Real Zaragoza, appearing in 280 official games and scoring 96 goals.

== Club career ==
Born in Santa Cruz de Tenerife, Canary Islands, Santos started playing with local CD Tenerife. He signed for Real Zaragoza in March 1963, going on to spend nine of his ten seasons with the club in La Liga and being part of an attacking frontline dubbed Los Magníficos, which also featured Canário, Carlos Lapetra, Marcelino and Juan Manuel Villa.

Nicknamed Yeyo, Santos retired in 1975 aged 35 following a spell with CD Tudelano of Tercera División.

== International career ==
Santos earned one cap for Spain, playing the full 90 minutes in a 1–1 away friendly draw against Sweden on 2 May 1968.

== Death ==
Santos died in his hometown on 28 January 2008 at age 67, after a long battle with illness.

== Honours ==
Tenerife

- Segunda División: 1960–61

Zaragoza

- Copa del Generalísimo: 1963–64, 1965–66
- Inter-Cities Fairs Cup: 1963–64
