= Juan Manuel Villa =

Spanish footballer (1938–2025)

Personal information
- Full name: Juan Manuel Villa Gutiérrez
- Date of birth: 26 September 1938
- Place of birth: Seville, Spain
- Date of death: 5 January 2025 (aged 86)
- Place of death: Zaragoza, Spain
- Position: Midfielder

Youth career
- 1953–1959: Real Madrid

Senior career*
Years	Team	Apps	(Gls)
1959–1960	Plus Ultra	37	(24)
1960–1962	Real Madrid	0	(0)
1961–1962	→ Real Sociedad (loan)	21	(10)
1962–1971	Zaragoza	162	(43)
Total		220	(77)

International career
1964	Spain	3	(0)
- * Club domestic league appearances and goals

Juan Manuel Villa Gutiérrez (26 September 1938 – 5 January 2025) was a Spanish footballer who played as a midfielder.

He spent the better part of his career with Real Zaragoza, winning three major trophies while scoring 70 goals from 233 competitive appearances.

== Club career ==
Born in Seville, Andalusia, Villa joined the youth system of Real Madrid at the age of 15. He made his senior debut with their reserves in 1959.

Villa never appeared in La Liga for the first team, his only two competitive matches being in the Copa del Generalísimo against Extremadura and Barcelona. He played in the competition with Real Sociedad and Real Zaragoza, totalling 183 games and 53 goals over the course of ten seasons before retiring in 1971 aged 32.

At Zaragoza, Villa was part of an attacking line that also included Canário, Carlos Lapetra, Marcelino and Eleuterio Santos, dubbed Los Magníficos (The Magnificent). During his spell in Aragon, he won two Spanish Cups and the 1963–64 edition of the Inter-Cities Fairs Cup, scoring in the latter tournament in wins over Iraklis (3–0), Juventus (3–2) and Valencia (2–1).

== International career ==
Villa earned three caps for Spain, all in 1964. His debut arrived on 11 March in the first leg of the 1964 European Nations' Cup's last qualifying stage, a 5–1 home victory over the Republic of Ireland (7–1 aggregate).

== Personal life and death ==
Villa and his wife habitually spent six months of every year in Cambrils, Province of Tarragona. On 17 August 2017, they were caught in the crossfire of the terrorist attacks in the region in which a 67-year-old woman was killed by stabbing and six others were injured.

On 5 January 2025, Villa died in Zaragoza at the age of 86.

== Honours ==
Zaragoza

- Copa del Generalísimo: 1963–64, 1965–66
- Inter-Cities Fairs Cup: 1963–64
