= Marcelino Martínez =

Spanish footballer (born 1940)

Marcelino
Personal information
- Full name: Marcelino Martínez Cao
- Date of birth: 29 April 1940 (age 86)
- Place of birth: Ares, Spain
- Height: 1.73 m (5 ft 8 in)
- Position: Striker

Youth career
- Numancia Ares
- 1957–1958: Galicia Mugardos

Senior career*
Years	Team	Apps	(Gls)
1958–1959	Racing Ferrol	30	(2)
1959–1970	Zaragoza	232	(70)
Total		262	(72)

International career
1961	Spain B	2	(2)
1961–1967	Spain	14	(4)
Medal record
Representing Spain
European Nations' Cup
Winner	1964 Spain
- * Club domestic league appearances and goals

Marcelino Martínez Cao (Spanish pronunciation: [maɾθeˈlino maɾˈtineθ]; born 29 April 1940), known simply as Marcelino, is a Spanish former footballer who played as a striker.

== Club career ==
Marcelino was born in Ares, Province of A Coruña, Galicia. In 1959, he signed with Real Zaragoza from local Racing de Ferrol, going on to remain with the former club until his retirement 11 years later.

During his spell with the Aragonese, always spent in La Liga, Marcelino scored 117 goals in all competitions, contributing solidly as they won three major titles, including two Copa del Rey trophies. He was part of an efficient attacking line dubbed Los Magníficos (The Magnificent) which also featured Canário, Carlos Lapetra, Eleuterio Santos and Juan Manuel Villa.

== International career ==
Marcelino played 14 times for Spain, participating in the 1964 European Nations' Cup and the 1966 FIFA World Cup. In the former tournament, he scored the decisive 2–1 in the final against the Soviet Union, through a header.

At the time of his debut, Marcelino was the first Zaragoza player to ever represent the national team.

== Career statistics ==
Scores and results list Spain's goal tally first, score column indicates score after each Marcelino goal.

List of international goals scored by Marcelino Martínez
No.	Date	Venue	Opponent	Score	Result	Competition
1	23 November 1961	Santiago Bernabéu, Madrid, Spain	Morocco	1–0	3–2	1962 World Cup qualification
2	11 March 1964	Sánchez Pizjuán, Seville, Spain	Republic of Ireland	4–1	5–1	1964 European Nations' Cup qualifying
3	11 March 1964	Sánchez Pizjuán, Seville, Spain	Republic of Ireland	5–1	5–1	1964 European Nations' Cup qualifying
4	21 June 1964	Santiago Bernabéu, Madrid, Spain	Soviet Union	2–1	2–1	1964 European Nations' Cup

== Honours ==
Zaragoza

- Copa del Generalísimo: 1963–64, 1965–66
- Inter-Cities Fairs Cup: 1963–64

Spain

- UEFA European Championship: 1964
