= Severino Reija =

Spanish footballer

Personal information
- Full name: Severino Reija Vázquez
- Date of birth: 25 November 1938 (age 87)
- Place of birth: Lugo, Spain
- Height: 1.65 m (5 ft 5 in)
- Position: Left back

Youth career
- Oza

Senior career*
Years	Team	Apps	(Gls)
1957–1959	Deportivo La Coruña	35	(2)
1959–1969	Zaragoza	253	(1)
Total		288	(3)

International career
1960	Spain U21	2	(0)
1961	Spain B	1	(0)
1962–1967	Spain	20	(0)
Medal record
Representing Spain
UEFA European Championship
Winner	1964 Spain
- * Club domestic league appearances and goals

Severino Reija Vázquez (born 25 November 1938 in Lugo, Galicia) is a Spanish former footballer who played as a defender.

== Career ==
Reija participated with the national team at the 1962 FIFA World Cup, the 1964 European Nations' Cup, and the 1966 FIFA World Cup.

== Honours ==
=== Club ===
Zaragoza

- Inter-Cities Fairs Cup: 1963–64
- Spanish Cup: 1963–64, 1965–1966

=== International ===
Spain

- European Nations' Cup: 1964
