= Canário =

Brazilian footballer (born 1934)

Personal information
- Full name: Darcy Silveira dos Santos
- Date of birth: 24 May 1934 (age 92)
- Place of birth: Rio de Janeiro, Brazil
- Height: 1.70 m (5 ft 7 in)
- Position: Forward

Youth career
- 1953: Olaria

Senior career*
Years	Team	Apps	(Gls)
1954–1955	Olaria		
1955–1959	America-RJ		
1959–1962	Real Madrid	28	(5)
1962–1963	Sevilla	30	(5)
1963–1968	Zaragoza	117	(35)
1968–1969	Mallorca	24	(2)

International career
1956	Brazil	7	(2)
- * Club domestic league appearances and goals

Darcy Silveira dos Santos (born 24 May 1934), known as Canário, is a Brazilian former professional footballer who played as a forward.

Over nine seasons, he amassed La Liga totals of 175 matches and 45 goals, most notably while with Real Madrid and Zaragoza. He won seven trophies between the two clubs.

== Club career ==
Born in Rio de Janeiro, Canário played for Olaria Atlético Clube and America Football Club in his country. In 1959, he moved to Spain where he would remain until his retirement, starting with Real Madrid and being used mainly as a backup in a three-year spell. He appeared in five games and scored one goal for the club in the European Cup, three being in the 1959–60 edition which ended in victory.

After spending the 1962–63 season with Sevilla FC, Canário signed for Real Zaragoza, going on to be part of an attacking frontline that was dubbed Los Magníficos (The Magnificent) and also included Carlos Lapetra, Marcelino, Eleuterio Santos and Juan Manuel Villa; he acted as right half in the team's formation. He reached four Copa del Rey finals with the Aragonese during his stint, winning the tournament twice.

Canário retired at the end of the 1968–69 campaign at the age of 33, after helping RCD Mallorca to promote from Segunda División. He subsequently settled in Zaragoza, where he ran a coffeehouse.

== International career ==
Canário won seven caps for Brazil, all in 1956. Barred by Garrincha, however, he never attended any major international tournament.

== Honours ==
Real Madrid

- La Liga: 1960–61, 1961–62
- European Cup: 1959–60
- Intercontinental Cup: 1960

Zaragoza

- Copa del Generalísimo: 1963–64, 1965–66
- Inter-Cities Fairs Cup: 1963–64

Brazil

- Taça do Atlântico: 1956
- Taça Oswaldo Cruz: 1956
