= Paco Santamaría =

Spanish footballer (born 1936)

Personal information
- Full name: Francisco Santamaría Mirones
- Date of birth: 8 September 1936 (age 90)
- Place of birth: Santander, Spain
- Position: Defender

Youth career
- San Roque
- –1955: Racing Santander

Senior career*
Years	Team	Apps	(Gls)
1955–1956	Rayo Cantabria		
1956–1962	Racing Santander	185	(0)
1962–1969	Real Zaragoza	153	(1)

International career
1955	Spain U18		
1955	Spain amateurs		(1)
1960	Spain U21	1	(0)
1966	Spain	1	(0)
- * Club domestic league appearances and goals

Francisco Santamaría Mirones (born 8 September 1936), commonly known as Paco Santamaría, is a Spanish former footballer who played as a defender.

== Early life and club career ==
Santamaría began playing football in the city of Santander, while attending the city's salesian school. After representing San Roque at a youth tournament, he joined the academy of Racing Santander. After playing briefly in the Tercera División with Rayo Cantabria, he was promoted to Racing Santander's senior team in 1956, later becoming one of the club's youngest captains.

In 1962, he joined Real Zaragoza, where he was part of their Los Magníficos side, which reached four Copa del Generalísimo finals, and two Inter-Cities Fairs Cup finals.

== International career ==
Santamaría captained the Spain under-18 national team at the 1955 UEFA European Under-18 Championship in Italy. He later played for both the Cantabria autonomous football team, as well as the Spain national amateur team at the 1955 Mediterranean Games, where he won a silver medal. In 1960, he played for the Spain under-21 national team in a 3–0 friendly defeat to Italy.

He made one appearance for the Spanish senior national team on 22 October 1966, in a 0–0 UEFA Euro 1968 qualifying draw with the Republic of Ireland.

== Post-playing career ==
Following his retirement, he briefly served as Zaragoza's general manager, before later serving as the technical secretary of Xerez.

== Personal life ==
His brother, Julio Santamaría, was also a Spanish footballer who played as a midfielder.

== Honours ==
Racing Santander

- Segunda División: 1959–60

Real Zaragoza

- Copa del Generalísimo: 1963–64, 1965–66; runners-up: 1962–63, 1964–65
- Inter-Cities Fairs Cup: 1963–64; runners-up: 1965–66

Spain amateurs

- Mediterranean Games silver medalist: 1955
