= Carlos Lapetra =

Spanish footballer (1938–1995)

Personal information
- Full name: Carlos Lapetra Coarasa
- Date of birth: 29 November 1938
- Place of birth: Zaragoza, Spain
- Date of death: 24 December 1995 (aged 57)
- Place of death: Zaragoza, Spain
- Height: 1.69 m (5 ft 7 in)
- Position: Forward

Youth career
- SEU Madrid

Senior career*
Years	Team	Apps	(Gls)
1958–1959	Guadalajara		
1959–1969	Zaragoza	194	(39)

International career
1963–1966	Spain	13	(1)
Medal record
Representing Spain
European Nations' Cup
Winner	1964 Spain
- * Club domestic league appearances and goals

Carlos Lapetra Coarasa (29 November 1938 – 24 December 1995) was a Spanish footballer who played as a forward.

He spent ten of his 11 years as a professional with Zaragoza, appearing in 279 competitive games (61 goals) and winning three major titles with the club.

A Spain international during the 1960s, Lapetra represented the country at the 1964 European Nations' Cup and the 1966 World Cup, winning the former tournament.

== Club career ==
Lapetra was born in Zaragoza, Aragon, as his parents had relocated to the city from Huesca due to the Spanish Civil War. After one year in the lower leagues with CD Guadalajara, he signed with Real Zaragoza in 1959, remaining with the latter until his retirement.

During his one-decade spell at the La Romareda, Lapetra was part of an attacking unit that also featured Canário, Marcelino, Eleuterio Santos and Juan Manuel Villa, dubbed Los Magníficos (The Magnificent). He helped the club to four Copa del Rey finals in the 1960s, winning twice and scoring in both matches, against Atlético Madrid in 1964 and Athletic Bilbao in 1966.

Lapetra retired from football at only 30, due to recurrent injury problems and as Zaragoza did not renew his contract. He settled in Huesca subsequently, working in directorial capacities with SD Huesca and the Spain national team.

== International career ==
Lapetra earned 13 caps for Spain in three years. He was part of the squads that appeared at the 1964 European Nations' Cup (starting in the 2–1 final win against the Soviet Union in place of the legendary Francisco Gento) and the 1966 FIFA World Cup (featured in the 2–1 group stage loss to West Germany).

=== International goals ===
#	Date	Venue	Opponent	Score	Result	Competition
1.	27 October 1965	Sánchez Pizjuán, Seville, Spain	Republic of Ireland	4–1	4–1	1966 World Cup qualification

== Personal life and death ==
Lapetra's older brother, Ricardo, was also a footballer. He too played for Zaragoza, but with much less success.

Lapetra died on 24 December 1995 at the age of 57, due to cancer.

== Honours ==
Zaragoza

- Copa del Generalísimo: 1963–64, 1965–66
- Inter-Cities Fairs Cup: 1963–64

Spain

- UEFA European Championship: 1964
