= 1965–66 Copa del Generalísimo =

64th Copa del Rey

Tournament details
- Country: Spain
- Teams: 48

Final positions
- Champions: Real Zaragoza (2nd title)
- Runners-up: Club Atlético de Bilbao

Tournament statistics
- Matches played: 99

The 1965–66 Copa del Generalísimo was the 64th staging of the Spanish Cup. The competition began on 24 October 1965 and ended on 29 May 1966 with the final.

== First round ==
Team 1	Agg.	Team 2	1st leg	2nd leg
Algeciras CF	1–3	UP Langreo	0–0	1–3
CF Badalona	1–5	Hércules CF	1–4	0–1
Burgos CF	0–4	CD Mestalla	0–1	0–3
Calvo Sotelo CF	4–3	Baracaldo CF	4–1	0–2
CD Constancia	1–4	Real Oviedo	1–2	0–2
CD Europa	2–1	CD Badajoz	2–1	0–0
Real Gijón	4–0	Real Murcia	2–0	2–0
CD Hospitalet	2–2	Real Valladolid	1–0	1–2
Recreativo de Huelva	2–3	CA Osasuna	1–1	1–2
SD Indauchu	6–1	Cádiz CF	5–0	1–1
UD Lérida	4–3	CA Ceuta	3–1	1–2
Levante UD	0–4	Celta Vigo	0–2	0–2
Melilla CF	2–10	Deportivo La Coruña	1–1	1–9
Rayo Vallecano	1–3	Real Sociedad	1–1	0–2
Real Santander	3–3	Granada CF	1–0	2–3
CD Tenerife	2–2	CD Condal	2–1	0–1

Source: RSSSF

- Tiebreaker

Team 1	Score	Team 2
CD Hospitalet	1–2	Real Valladolid
Real Santander	1–0	Granada CF
CD Tenerife	2–1	CD Condal

== Round of 32 ==
Team 1	Agg.	Team 2	1st leg	2nd leg
Calvo Sotelo CF	2–9	Real Zaragoza	1–4	1–5
CD Condal	2–6	Club Atlético de Bilbao	1–3	1–3
Córdoba CF	3–0	UD Lérida	2–0	1–0
RCD Español	3–2	Celta Vigo	2–1	1–1
Hércules CF	2–2	UD Las Palmas	2–1	0–1
SD Indauchu	2–8	Elche CF	1–3	1–5
UP Langreo	2–4	Valencia CF	1–2	1–2
CD Mestalla	1–3	Club Atlético de Madrid	1–3	0–0
CA Osasuna	4–5	CD Málaga	1–3	3–2
Real Oviedo	1–4	Real Betis Balompié	1–0	0–4
Pontevedra CF	2–3	Deportivo La Coruña	0–2	2–1
Real Madrid CF	6–2	Real Gijón	2–0	4–2
RCD Mallorca	5–0	Real Sociedad	2–0	3–0
CD Sabadell CF	1–1	CD Europa	1–1	0–0
Real Santander	0–10	CF Barcelona	0–2	0–8
Sevilla CF	2–3	Real Valladolid	2–0	0–3

Source: RSSSF

- Tiebreaker

Team 1	Score	Team 2
Hércules CF	0–1	UD Las Palmas
CD Sabadell CF	2–0	CD Europa

== Round of 16 ==
Team 1	Agg.	Team 2	1st leg	2nd leg
Club Atlético de Bilbao	3–2	UD Las Palmas	1–0	2–2
Córdoba CF	1–6	Real Zaragoza	0–2	1–4
Deportivo La Coruña	1–5	Elche CF	1–2	0–3
RCD Español	2–5	Real Betis Balompié	2–1	0–4
Real Madrid CF	2–2	CD Málaga	1–1	1–1
RCD Mallorca	3–5	CF Barcelona	2–0	1–5
CD Sabadell CF	2–1	Real Valladolid	2–0	0–1
Valencia CF	1–2	Club Atlético de Madrid	0–0	1–2

Source: RSSSF

- Tiebreaker

Team 1	Score	Team 2
Real Madrid CF	2–0	CD Málaga

== Quarter-finals ==
Team 1	Agg.	Team 2	1st leg	2nd leg
Club Atlético de Madrid	1–2	Club Atlético de Bilbao	1–0	0–2
CF Barcelona	3–0	Elche CF	1–0	2–0
Real Betis Balompié	5–4	Real Madrid CF	3–2	2–2
CD Sabadell CF	1–7	Real Zaragoza CD	1–4	0–3

Source: RSSSF

== Semi-finals ==
Team 1	Agg.	Team 2	1st leg	2nd leg
Club Atlético de Bilbao	5–2	Real Betis Balompié	1–1	4–1
CF Barcelona	2–3	Real Zaragoza CD	2–2	0–1

Source: RSSSF

== Final ==
Team 1	Score	Team 2
Real Zaragoza CD	2–0	Club Atlético de Bilbao

Copa del Generalísimo
winners
Real Zaragoza
2nd title
