= 1963–64 Copa del Generalísimo =

62nd Copa del Rey

Tournament details
- Country: Spain
- Teams: 48

Final positions
- Champions: Real Zaragoza (1st title)
- Runners-up: Club Atlético de Madrid

Tournament statistics
- Matches played: 98

The 1963–64 Copa del Generalísimo was the 62nd staging of the Spanish Cup. The competition began on 27 October 1963 and ended on 5 July 1964 with the final.

== First round ==
Team 1	Agg.	Team 2	1st leg	2nd leg
CD Abarán	2–3	Deportivo La Coruña	2–1	0–2
CA Ceuta	4–5	CD Alavés	1–2	3–3
Burgos CF	0–2	Melilla CF	0–0	0–2
Celta Vigo	2–1	Cádiz CF	0–0	2–1
CD Eldense	4–3	Real Gijón	4–1	0–2
CD Hospitalet	1–1	Hércules CF	1–0	0–1
SD Indauchu	8–3	Granada CF	4–2	4–1
UP Langreo	3–2	Algeciras CF	2–1	1–1
UD Las Palmas	4–4	CD Constancia	3–0	1–4
RCD Mallorca	3–2	Real Santander	3–1	0–1
CD Mestalla	4–3	CD Europa	4–1	0–2
Onteniente CF	4–4	CF Badalona	3–2	1–2
CD Orense	2–1	Recreativo de Huelva	2–0	0–1
CA Osasuna	3–4	CD Tenerife	2–2	1–2
UD Salamanca	2–5	CD Málaga	1–1	1–4
CD San Fernando	2–3	Real Sociedad	2–2	0–1

Source: RSSSF

- Tiebreaker

Team 1	Score	Team 2
CD Hospitalet	0–1	Hércules CF
UD Las Palmas	0–1	CD Constancia
Onteniente CF	4–1	CF Badalona

== Round of 32 ==
Team 1	Agg.	Team 2	1st leg	2nd leg
CD Alavés	4–6	Real Betis	1–1	3–5
Club Atlético de Bilbao	1–2	Celta Vigo	1–1	0–1
CF Barcelona	8–2	CD Tenerife	7–0	1–2
Deportivo La Coruña	5–3	Real Murcia	5–0	0–3
Elche CF	1–1	Hércules CF	0–0	1–1
UP Langreo	3–5	Córdoba CF	1–1	2–4
Real Madrid CF	10–2	SD Indauchu	7–0	3–2
CD Málaga	0–9	Atlético de Madrid	0–2	0–7
RCD Mallorca	2–4	Real Zaragoza	0–2	2–2
Melilla CF	1–2	Real Valladolid	1–0	0–2
Onteniente CF	3–5	Real Oviedo	1–1	2–4
CD Orense	2–3	RCD Español	2–1	0–2
Pontevedra CF	6–3	CD Eldense	5–0	1–3
Real Sociedad	1–0	Levante UD	0–0	1–0
Sevilla CF	2–1	CD Constancia	2–0	0–1
Valencia CF	7–0	CD Mestalla	2–0	5–0

Source: RSSSF

- Tiebreaker

Team 1	Score	Team 2
Elche CF	0–1	Hércules CF

== Round of 16 ==
Team 1	Agg.	Team 2	1st leg	2nd leg
Real Betis	2–1	Pontevedra CF	1–1	1–0
Celta Vigo	2–4	Club Atlético de Madrid	2–1	0–3
Córdoba CF	3–6	CF Barcelona	1–2	2–4
Deportivo La Coruña	1–5	Valencia CF	1–0	0–5
RCD Español	3–1	Sevilla CF	3–1	0–0
Real Madrid CF	2–0	Real Sociedad	1–0	1–0
Real Valladolid	3–6	Hércules CF	3–2	0–4
Real Zaragoza	9–3	Real Oviedo	6–0	3–3

Source: RSSSF

== Quarter-finals ==
Team 1	Agg.	Team 2	1st leg	2nd leg
CF Barcelona	7–3	RCD Español	3–1	4–2
Real Betis	3–4	Valencia CF	2–2	1–2
Hércules CF	0–4	Real Zaragoza CD	0–1	0–3
Real Madrid CF	3–3	Club Atlético de Madrid	2–2	1–1

Source: RSSSF

- Tiebreaker

Team 1	Score	Team 2
Real Madrid CF	1–2	Club Atlético de Madrid

== Semi-finals ==
Team 1	Agg.	Team 2	1st leg	2nd leg
CF Barcelona	3–4	Real Zaragoza CD	3–2	0–2
Valencia CF	2–4	Club Atlético de Madrid	1–1	1–3

Source: RSSSF

== Final ==
Team 1	Score	Team 2
Real Zaragoza CD	2–1	Club Atlético de Madrid

Copa del Generalísimo
winners
Real Zaragoza
1st title
