= 1965–66 Atlético Madrid season =

Atlético Madrid
1965–66 season
- President: Vicente Calderon
- Head coach: Domènec Balmanya
- Stadium: Metropolitano
- Primera Division: Winners (In 1966–67 European Cup)
- Copa del Generalísimo: Quarter-finals
- European Cup Winners' Cup: Quarterfinals
- Top goalscorer: Luis Aragones (18)
Home colours

The 1965–66 season was Atlético Madrid's 62nd season in existence and the club's 29th consecutive season in the top flight of Spanish football.

== Summary ==
The club clinched the league trophy after almost 15 years since the last title in a close race against archrivals Real Madrid clinching the league in the last round. Meanwhile, in European Cup Winners' Cup the squad reached the quarterfinals stage only to be defeated by future Champions Borussia Dortmund which will mean the first Continental trophy for a German club. Also Forward Luis Aragones shared the Pichichi trophy for the highest scorer in the league.

== Squad ==
Note: Flags indicate national team as defined under FIFA eligibility rules; some limited exceptions apply. Players may hold more than one non-FIFA nationality.

No.	Pos.	Nation	Player
-	GK	ARG	Edgardo Madinabeytia
-	GK	ESP	Rodri
-	GK	ESP	Miguel San Román
-	DF	ARG	Jorge Griffa
-	DF	ESP	Feliciano Rivilla
-	DF	ESP	Jesús Martínez Jayo
-	DF	ESP	Colo
-	DF	ESP	Isacio Calleja
-	MF	ESP	Adelardo
-	MF	ESP	Luis Aragonés

No.	Pos.	Nation	Player
-	MF	ESP	Jesús Glaría Jordán
-	MF	ESP	Manuel Ruiz Sosa
-	MF	ESP	Francisco García Gerpe
-	MF	ESP	Victor Díez
-	FW	ESP	José Ufarte
-	FW	ESP	Enrique Collar
-	FW	POR	Jorge Alberto Mendonça
-	FW	HON	José Cardona
-	FW	ESP	Miguel Jones
-	FW	PAR	Alejandro Fretes

=== Transfers ===
In
Pos.	Name	from	Type
GK	Rodri	Pontevedra CF	
MF	Víctor Díez	Indauchu	
MF	Pedro Olalde		
FW	Isidro Ruiz	Racing Santander	
DF	Antonio Martos Mesa	Real Murcia	

Out
Pos.	Name	To	Type
MF	Ramiro		
FW	Eulogio Martínez	CE Europa	
MF	Joan Piñol Voltés		
DF	José Zamanillo	Racing Santander	
DF	Ernesto Trallero	Racing Santander	
MF	José Rives	CD Málaga	
FW	Enrique Mario Vega	Racing Santander	
DF	Pedro María Olalde	Osasuna	

== Competitions ==
=== Primera División ===
==== League table ====
Pos	Team	Pld	W	D	L	GF	GA	GD	Pts	Qualification or relegation
1	Atlético Madrid (C)	30	18	8	4	54	20	+34	44	Qualification for the European Cup first round
2	Real Madrid	30	19	5	6	53	30	+23	43	Qualification for the European Cup second round (Note: Real Madrid qualified for the European Cup as title holders.)
3	Barcelona	30	16	6	8	51	27	+24	38	Invited for the Inter-Cities Fairs Cup
4	Zaragoza	30	14	8	8	47	29	+18	36	Qualification for the Cup Winners' Cup first round (Note: Zaragoza qualified to the Cup Winners' Cup as champions of the Copa del Generalísimo.)
5	Atlético Bilbao	30	14	6	10	43	32	+11	34	Invited for the Inter-Cities Fairs Cup

Source: BDFútbol
Rules for classification: 1) Points; 2) Head-to-head results; 3) Goal difference; 4) Number of goals scored
(C) Champions

==== Position by round ====
Round	1	2	3	4	5	6	7	8	9	10	11	12	13	14	15	16	17	18	19	20	21	22	23	24	25	26	27	28	29	30
Ground	H	A	H	A	H	A	H	A	H	A	H	A	H	H	A	A	H	A	H	A	H	A	H	A	H	A	H	A	A	H
Result	D	W	D	W	W	D	W	W	W	W	L	D	W	D	W	L	D	W	D	W	L	L	D	W	W	W	W	W	W	W
Position	5	3	4	2	1	3	1	2	1	1	1	1	1	1	1	1	1	1	1	1	2	2	3	2	2	2	2	2	1	1

Source: www.lfp.es
A = Away; H = Home; W = Win; D = Draw; L = Loss; = Leader, 1966-67 European Cup; = 1966–67 Inter-Cities Fairs Cup

==== Matches ====
5 September 1965 1	Real Zaragoza	2–2	Atlético Madrid	Zaragoza
	Lapetra 36'; Marcelino 64'	Report	15' Jones; 70' Cardona	Stadium: La Romareda; Referee: Ortiz de Mendíbil

12 September 1965 2	Atlético Madrid	3–0	Elche CF	Madrid
	Aragonés 38', 85' (pen.); Mendonça 62'	Report		Stadium: Metropolitano; Referee: Pintado Viu

19 September 1965 3	Sevilla FC	1–1	Atlético Madrid	Seville
	Cabral 60'	Report	58' Mendonça	Stadium: Ramón Sánchez Pizjuán; Referee: Ruiz Alciturri

26 September 1965 4	Atlético Madrid	1–0	CD Málaga	Madrid
	Jones 14'	Report		Stadium: Metropolitano; Referee: Medina Iglesias

3 October 1965 5	Athletic Bilbao	0–2	Atlético Madrid	Bilbao
		Report	40' Aragonés; 75' Cardona	Stadium: San Mamés; Referee: Martín Álvarez

10 October 1965 6	Atlético Madrid	1–1	Real Madrid	Madrid
	Adelardo 18'	Report	11' Gento	Stadium: Metropolitano; Referee: Zariquiegui Izco

17 October 1965 7	CF Barcelona	1–4	Atlético Madrid	Barcelona
	Gallego 55'	Report	36' Ufarte; 43' Adelardo; 45' (rig) Aragonés; 49' Mendonça	Stadium: Estadio del CF Barcelona; Referee: Bueno Perales

31 October 1965 8	Atlético Madrid	1–0	Mallorca	Madrid
	Aragonés 55'	Report		Stadium: Metropolitano; Referee: Lloris Antonino

14 November 1965 9	Sabadell	0–1	Atlético Madrid	Sabadell
		Report	77' Adelardo	Stadium: Nova Creu Alta; Referee: Ortiz de Mendíbil

23 November 1965 10	Atlético Madrid	3–0	Real Betis	Madrid
	Aragonés 12' (rig), 50', 88'	Report		Stadium: Metropolitano; Referee: Sánchez Ibáñez

28 November 1965 11	Pontevedra CF	1–0	Atlético Madrid	Pontevedra
	Odriozola 46'	Report		Stadium: Pasarón; Referee: Pintado Viu

5 December 1965 12	Atlético Madrid	2–2	Valencia CF	Madrid
	Aragonés 23', 32'	Report	70' Paquito; 89' Urtiaga	Stadium: Metropolitano; Referee: Gardeazabal Garay

12 December 1965 13	Cordoba CF	0–1	Atlético Madrid	Cordoba
		Report	26' Aragonés	Stadium: El Arcángel; Referee: Oliva Fortuny

19 December 1965 14	UD Las Palmas	1–1	Atlético Madrid	Las Palmas
	Gilberto 89'	Report	80' Mendonça	Stadium: Insular; Referee: Bueno Perales

26 December 1965 15	Atlético Madrid	5–2	Español	Madrid
	Ufarte 5', 84'; Adelardo 54', 63'; Mendonça 75'	Report	19' Amas; 73' Idígoras	Stadium: Metropolitano; Referee: Ruiz Alciturri

2 January 1966 16	Atlético Madrid	0–1	Real Zaragoza	Madrid
		Report	69' Marcelino	Stadium: Metropolitano; Referee: Medina Iglesias

6 January 1966 17	Elche CF	0–0	Atlético Madrid	Elche
		Report		Stadium: Altabix; Referee: Rigo Sureda

9 January 1966 18	Atlético Madrid	6–1	Sevilla FC	Madrid
	Mendonça 12', 60'; Aragonés 20' (rig), 58', 85'; Collar 66'	Report	88' Cabral	Stadium: Metropolitano; Referee: Sánchez Ibáñez

16 January 1966 19	CD Málaga	1–1	Atlético Madrid	Málaga
	Moli 14'	Report	9' Mendonça	Stadium: La Rosaleda; Referee: Ortiz de Mendíbil

23 January 1966 20	Atlético Madrid	1–0	Athletic Bilbao	Madrid
	Cardona 2'	Report		Stadium: Metropolitano; Referee: Oliva Fortuny

30 January 1966 21	Real Madrid	3–1	Atlético Madrid	Madrid
	Pirri 44'; Grosso 60'; Amancio 67'	Report	32' Ufarte	Stadium: Santiago Bernabéu; Referee: Ortiz de Mendíbil

1 February 1966 22	Atlético Madrid	0–1	CF Barcelona	Madrid
		Report	20' Muller	Stadium: Metropolitano; Referee: Rigo Sureda

13 February 1966 23	Mallorca	0–0	Atlético Madrid	Palma
		Report		Stadium: Lluís Sitjar; Referee: Bueno Perales

20 February 1966 24	Atlético Madrid	3–0	CE Sabadell	Madrid
	Aragonés 24', 32'; Collar 82'	Report		Stadium: Metropolitano; Referee: Ruiz Alciturri

27 February 1966 25	Real Betis	1–2	Atlético Madrid	Seville
	Frasco 33'	Report	13' Aragonés; 43' Mendonça	Stadium: Benito Villamarín; Referee: Medina Iglesias

6 March 1966 26	Atlético Madrid	4–0	Pontevedra CF	Madrid
	Aragonés 44' (rig); Cardona 60'; Adelardo 80'; Collar 86'	Report		Stadium: Metropolitano; Referee: De la Teja Ocejo

13 March 1966 27	Valencia CF	1–2	Atlético Madrid	Valencia
	Guillot 62'	Report	9' Ufarte; 51' Mendonça	Stadium: Mestalla; Referee: Medina Iglesias

20 March 1966 28	Atlético Madrid	2–0	Cordoba CF	Madrid
	Rivilla 36'; Mendonça 42'	Report		Stadium: Metropolitano; Referee: Sánchez Ibáñez

27 March 1966 29	Atlético Madrid	2–0	UD Las Palmas	Madrid
	Jones 6', 21'	Report		Stadium: Metropolitano; Referee: Birigay Nieva

3 April 1966 30	Español	0–2	Atlético Madrid	Barcelona
		Report	43' Ufarte; 45' Griffa	Stadium: Sarriá; Referee: Ruiz Alciturri

=== Copa del Generalísimo ===
==== Round of 32 ====
10 April 1966 1	Mestalla	1–3	Atlético Madrid	Valencia
	Olivella 75'	Report	18' Glaría; 20' Cardona; 48' Jones	Stadium: Mestalla; Referee: Zariquiegui Izco

17 April 1966 2	Atlético Madrid	0–0	Mestalla	Madrid
		Report		Stadium: Metropolitano; Referee: Sánchez Ríos

==== Eightfinals ====
23 April 1966 1	Valencia CF	0–0	Atlético Madrid	Valencia
		Report		Stadium: Mestalla; Referee: Ortiz de Mendíbil

30 April 1966 2	Atlético Madrid	2–1	Valencia CF	Madrid
	Martínez Jayo 80'; Cardona 90'	Report	53' Guillot	Stadium: Metropolitano; Referee: Zariquiegui Izco

==== Quarterfinals ====
7 May 1966 1	Atlético Madrid	1–0	Athletic Bilbao	Madrid
	Cardona 43'	Report		Stadium: Metropolitano; Referee: Sánchez Ibáñez

14 May 1966 2	Athletic Bilbao	2–0 (a.e.t.)	Atlético Madrid	Bilbao
	Aguirre 19'; Ormaza 103'	Report		Stadium: San Mamés; Referee: Ruiz Alciturri

=== European Cup Winners' Cup ===
==== First round ====
15 September 1965 1	Atlético Madrid (Spain)	4–0	(Socialist Federal Republic of Yugoslavia) Dinamo Zagreb	Madrid
	Mendonça 10', 21', 85'; Aragonés 65'	Report		Stadium: Metropolitano; Attendance: 32,000; Referee: (England) McCabe

22 September 1965 2	Dinamo Zagreb (Socialist Federal Republic of Yugoslavia)	0–1	(Spain) Atlético Madrid	Zagabria
		Report	80' Adelardo	Stadium: Dinamo; Attendance: 30,000; Referee: (West Germany) Schulenburg

==== Eightfinals ====
17 November 1965 1	Stiinta Cluj (Romania)	0–2	(Spain) Atlético Madrid	Cluj-Napoca
		Report	66' Collar; 84' Adelardo	Stadium: Ion Moina; Attendance: 20,000; Referee: (Czech Republic) Obtulovič

15 December 1965 2	Atlético Madrid (Spain)	4–0	(Romania) Stiinta Cluj	Madrid
	Mendonça 26', 70'; V. Díez 38'; Aragonés 75' (rig)	Report		Stadium: Metropolitano; Attendance: 10,000; Referee: (England) Finney

==== Quarterfinals ====
16 February 1966 1	Atlético Madrid (Spain)	1–1	(West Germany) Borussia Dortmund	Madrid
	Mendonça 87'	Report	58' Emmerich	Stadium: Metropolitano; Attendance: 20,000; Referee: (England) Clements

2 March 1966 2	Borussia Dortmund (West Germany)	1–0	(Spain) Atlético Madrid	Dortmund
	Emmerich 16'	Report		Stadium: Rote Erde; Attendance: 32,000; Referee: (Hungary) Lajos

== Statistics ==
=== Players statistics ===
No.	Pos	Nat	Player	Total		Primera Division		European Cup Winners' Cup		Copa del Generalisimo	
No.	Pos	Nat	Player	Apps	Goals	Apps	Goals	Apps	Goals	Apps	Goals
-	GK	(Argentina) ARG	Edgardo Madinabeytia	20	-13	20	-13				
-	DF	(Spain) ESP	Feliciano Rivilla	24	1	24	1				
-	DF	(Spain) ESP	Jesús Martínez Jayo	22	0	22	0				
-	DF	(Argentina) ARG	Jorge Griffa	26	1	26	1				
-	DF	(Spain) ESP	Colo	18	0	18	0				
-	MF	(Spain) ESP	Adelardo	28	6	28	6				
-	MF	(Spain) ESP	Luis Aragonés	28	18	28	18				
-	MF	(Spain) ESP	Jesús Glaría Jordán	27	0	27	0				
-	FW	(Spain) ESP	José Ufarte	28	6	28	6				
-	FW	(Portugal) POR	Jorge Alberto Mendonça	24	10	24	10				
-	FW	(Spain) ESP	Enrique Collar	23	3	23	3				
-	GK	(Spain) ESP	Rodri	10	-7	10	-7				
-	MF	(Spain) ESP	Manuel Ruiz Sosa	15	0	15	0				
-	FW	(Honduras) HON	José Cardona	10	4	10	4				
-	DF	(Spain) ESP	Isacio Calleja	10	0	10	0				
-	FW	(Spain) ESP	Miguel Jones	9	5	9	5				
-	MF	(Spain) ESP	Francisco García Gerpe	4	0	4	0				
-	MF	(Spain) ESP	Victor Díez	3	0	3	0				
-	FW	(Paraguay) PAR	Alejandro Fretes	1	0	1	0				
-	GK	(Spain) ESP	Miguel San Román								

- Source: https://www.bdfutbol.com/en/t/t1965-667.html
