= 1966–67 European Cup =

European football tournament

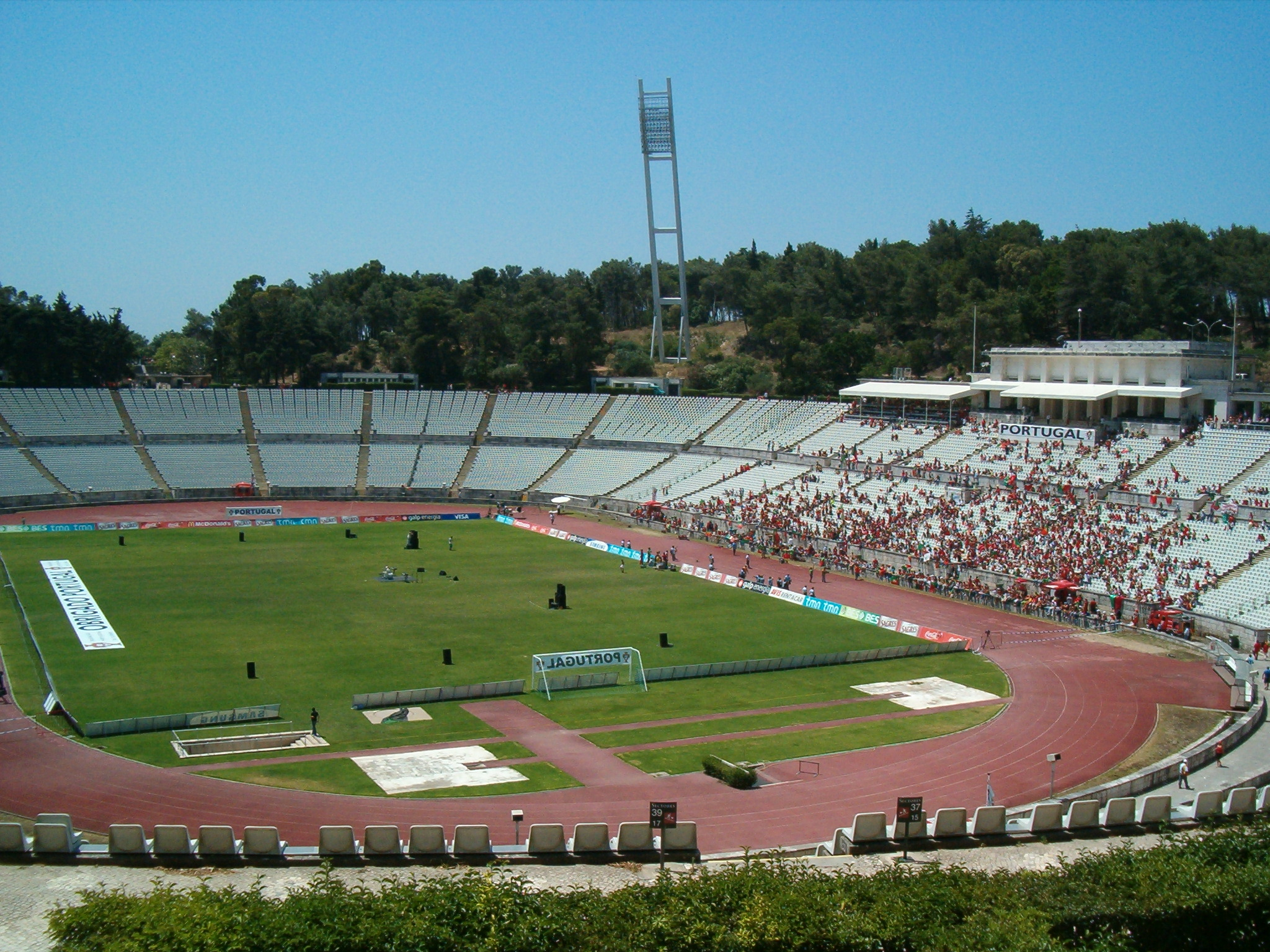
- The Estádio Nacional in Lisbon hosted the final.

Tournament details
- Dates: 7 September 1966 – 25 May 1967
- Teams: 33 (32 competed) (from 32 associations)

Final positions
- Champions: (Scotland) Celtic (1st title)
- Runners-up: (Italy) Inter Milan

Tournament statistics
- Matches played: 65
- Goals scored: 212 (3.26 per match)
- Attendance: 1,786,150 (27,479 per match)
- Top scorer(s): Paul Van Himst (Anderlecht); 6 goals

The 1966–67 European Cup was the 12th season of the European Cup, UEFA's premier club football tournament. The competition was won by Celtic for the first time, when they beat Inter Milan 2–1 in the final at the Estádio Nacional, Lisbon, on 25 May 1967, making them the first British team, as well as the only Scottish team (as of 2026) to win the trophy. Celtic also became just the second team to win the tournament on their debut appearance after Inter Milan in 1963–64 edition.

Real Madrid were the defending champions, but were eliminated by eventual finalists Inter Milan in the quarter-finals.

The Soviet Union entered its champion for the first time this season.

== Teams ==
A total of 33 teams participated in the competition.

Spain was represented by two clubs, with Real Madrid qualifying as title holders and Atlético Madrid as Spanish champions.

Real Madrid made their twelfth consecutive appearance in the competition, while CSKA Red Flag participated for the eighth time. Anderlecht and Dukla Prague appeared in their seventh tournament.

Admira-NÖ Energie Wien, Omonia, Vålerenga, Waterford, Celtic, Torpedo Moscow, 1860 Munich, and Vojvodina made their debut in the competition.

Atlético Madrid returned to the tournament for the first time since 1958–59 edition, while Petrolul Ploiești returned to the competition after seven years. Ajax, Beşiktaş and Olympiacos made their first appearance for six years.

All participants were their respective associations champions, except for title holders Real Madrid.

(Albania) 17 Nëntori (1st)	(Austria) Admira-NÖ Energie Wien (1st)	(Belgium) Anderlecht (1st)	(Bulgaria) CSKA Red Flag (1st)
(Cyprus) Omonia (1st)	(Czechoslovakia) Dukla Prague (1st)	(Denmark) Esbjerg (1st)	(East Germany) Vorwärts Berlin (1st)
(England) Liverpool (1st)	(Finland) Haka (1st)	(France) Nantes (1st)	(Greece) Olympiacos (1st)
(Hungary) Vasas (1st)	(Iceland) KR (1st)	(Italy) Inter Milan (1st)	(Luxembourg) Aris Bonnevoie (1st)
(Malta) Sliema Wanderers (1st)	(Netherlands) Ajax (1st)	(Northern Ireland) Linfield (1st)	(Norway) Vålerenga (1st)
(Poland) Górnik Zabrze (1st)	(Portugal) Sporting CP (1st)	(Republic of Ireland) Waterford (1st)	(Romania) Petrolul Ploiești (1st)
(Scotland) Celtic (1st)	(Spain) Atlético Madrid (1st)	(Spain) Real Madrid (2nd)^{TH}	(Sweden) Malmö FF (1st)
(Switzerland) Zürich (1st)	(Turkey) Beşiktaş (1st)	(Soviet Union) Torpedo Moscow (1st)	(West Germany) 1860 Munich (1st)
(Socialist Federal Republic of Yugoslavia) Vojvodina (1st)

== Preliminary round ==
Location of teams in the 1966–67 European Cup

Due to the number of participating teams and to allow title holders to receive a bye to the next round, a second round was introduced in the competition.

With title holders Real Madrid placed in the second round, a draw took place to select four teams from the remaining participants to play preliminary round in September.

Team 1	Agg.	Team 2	1st leg	2nd leg
Sliema Wanderers (Malta)	1–6	(Bulgaria) CSKA Red Flag	1–2	0–4
Waterford (Republic of Ireland)	1–12	(East Germany) Vorwärts Berlin	1–6	0–6

=== First leg ===
31 August 1966

Waterford (Republic of Ireland)	1–6	(East Germany) Vorwärts Berlin
Lynch 65'	Report	Piepenburg 7', 78', 83'; Nachtigall 10', 37'; Fräßdorf 62'

Dalymount Park, Dublin
Attendance: 17,249
Referee: Laurens van Ravens (Netherlands)

7 September 1966

Sliema Wanderers (Malta)	1–2	(Bulgaria) CSKA Red Flag
Cini 58'	Report	Yakimov 20' (pen.), 54'

Empire Stadium, Gżira
Attendance: 8,202
Referee: Kevin Howley (England)

=== Second leg ===
7 September 1966

Vorwärts Berlin (East Germany)	6–0	(Republic of Ireland) Waterford
Wruck 5'; Müller 23', 72'; Piepenburg 62', 80'; Großheim 75'	Report

Friedrich-Ludwig-Jahn-Sportpark, Berlin
Attendance: 4,282
Referee: Ryszard Banasiuk (Poland)

Vorwärts Berlin won 12–1 on aggregate.

14 September 1966

CSKA Red Flag (Bulgaria)	4–0	(Malta) Sliema Wanderers
Zafirov 37'; Yakimov 41' (pen.); Nikodimov 54'; Tsanev 78'	Report

Stadion Narodna Armia, Sofia
Attendance: 14,513
Referee: Milivoje Gugulović (Yugoslavia)

CSKA Red Flag won 6–1 on aggregate.

== Bracket ==
First round
(Italy) Inter Milan	1	0	1
(Soviet Union) Torpedo Moscow	0	0	0
(Hungary) Vasas	5	2	7
(Portugal) Sporting CP	0	0	0
(West Germany) 1860 Munich	8	2	10
(Cyprus) Omonia	0	1	1
(Norway) Vålerenga	–	–	(w)
(Albania) 17 Nëntori	–	–	(o)
(Luxembourg) Aris Bonnevoie	3	1	4
(Northern Ireland) Linfield	3	6	9
(Bulgaria) CSKA Red Flag	3	0	3
(Greece) Olympiacos	1	1	2
(Poland) Górnik Zabrze	2	1	3 (3)
(East Germany) Vorwärts Berlin	1	2	3 (1)
(Sweden) Malmö FF	0	1	1
(Spain) Atlético Madrid	2	3	5
(Austria) Admira-NÖ Energie Wien	0	0	0
(Socialist Federal Republic of Yugoslavia) Vojvodina	0	1	1
(Iceland) KR	2	2	4
(France) Nantes	3	5	8
(Scotland) Celtic	2	3	5
(Switzerland) Zürich	0	0	0
(Netherlands) Ajax	2	2	4
(Turkey) Beşiktaş	0	1	1
(England) Liverpool	2	1	3 (2)
(Romania) Petrolul Ploiești	0	3	3 (0)
(Denmark) Esbjerg	0	0	0
(Czechoslovakia) Dukla Prague	2	4	6
(Finland) Haka	1	0	1
(Belgium) Anderlecht	10	2	12

Second round
(Italy) Inter Milan	2	2	4
(Hungary) Vasas	1	0	1
(West Germany) 1860 Munich	1	1	2
(Spain) Real Madrid	0	3	3
(Norway) Vålerenga	1	1	2
(Northern Ireland) Linfield	4	1	5
(Bulgaria) CSKA Red Flag	4	0	4
(Poland) Górnik Zabrze	0	3	3
(Spain) Atlético Madrid	1	2	3
(Socialist Federal Republic of Yugoslavia) Vojvodina	3	3	6
(France) Nantes	1	1	2
(Scotland) Celtic	3	3	6
(Netherlands) Ajax	5	2	7
(England) Liverpool	1	2	3
(Czechoslovakia) Dukla Prague	4	2	6
(Belgium) Anderlecht	1	1	2

Quarter-finals
(Italy) Inter Milan	1	2	3
(Spain) Real Madrid	0	0	0
(Northern Ireland) Linfield	2	0	2
(Bulgaria) CSKA Red Flag	2	1	3
(Socialist Federal Republic of Yugoslavia) Vojvodina	1	0	1
(Scotland) Celtic	0	2	2
(Netherlands) Ajax	1	1	2
(Czechoslovakia) Dukla Prague	1	2	3

Semi-finals
(Italy) Inter Milan	1	1	2 (1)
(Bulgaria) CSKA Red Flag	1	1	2 (0)
(Scotland) Celtic	3	0	3
(Czechoslovakia) Dukla Prague	1	0	1

Final
(Italy) Inter Milan	1
(Scotland) Celtic	2

== First round ==
Team 1	Agg.	Team 2	1st leg	2nd leg	Play-off
Malmö FF (Sweden)	1–5	(Spain) Atlético Madrid	0–2	1–3	
Admira-NÖ Energie Wien (Austria)	0–1	(Socialist Federal Republic of Yugoslavia) Vojvodina	0–1	0–0	
KR (Iceland)	4–8	(France) Nantes	2–3	2–5	
Celtic (Scotland)	5–0	(Switzerland) Zürich	2–0	3–0	
Ajax (Netherlands)	4–1	(Turkey) Beşiktaş	2–0	2–1	
Liverpool (England)	3–3	(Romania) Petrolul Ploiești	2–0	1–3	2–0
Esbjerg (Denmark)	0–6	(Czechoslovakia) Dukla Prague	0–2	0–4	
Haka (Finland)	1–12	(Belgium) Anderlecht	1–10	0–2	
Inter Milan (Italy)	1–0	(Soviet Union) Torpedo Moscow	1–0	0–0	
Vasas (Hungary)	7–0	(Portugal) Sporting CP	5–0	2–0	
1860 Munich (West Germany)	10–1	(Cyprus) Omonia	8–0	2–1	
Vålerenga (Norway)	(w/o) (Note: 17 Nëntori decided to withdraw from the competition before playing first match.)	(Albania) 17 Nëntori	—	—	
Aris Bonnevoie (Luxembourg)	4–9	(Northern Ireland) Linfield	3–3	1–6	
CSKA Red Flag (Bulgaria)	3–2	(Greece) Olympiacos	3–1	0–1	
Górnik Zabrze (Poland)	3–3	(East Germany) Vorwärts Berlin	2–1	1–2	3–1

=== First leg ===
7 September 1966

Admira-NÖ Energie Wien (Austria)	0–1	(Socialist Federal Republic of Yugoslavia) Vojvodina
	Report	Takač 79'

Praterstadion, Vienna
Attendance: 8,639
Referee: Helmut Fritz (West Germany)

7 September 1966

KR (Iceland)	2–3	(France) Nantes
Schram 43' (pen.), 82'	Report	Gondet 6', 62'; Simon 10'

Laugardalsvöllur, Reykjavík
Attendance: 2,332
Referee: Rolf Hansen (Norway)

7 September 1966

Aris Bonnevoie (Luxembourg)	3–3	(Northern Ireland) Linfield
Heger 1'; Hoffmann 60'; Kirchens 68'	Report	Hamilton 33'; Scott 48'; Pavis 58'

Municipal Stadium, Luxembourg City
Attendance: 2,436
Referee: Michel Kitabdjian (France)

14 September 1966

Haka (Finland)	1–10	(Belgium) Anderlecht
Mäkilä 5'	Report	Van Himst 6', 12', 26', 52', 58'; Devrindt 16', 42', 75'; Puis 31'; Cayuela 40'

Tehtaan kenttä, Valkeakoski
Attendance: 2,742
Referee: Johan Einar Boström (Sweden)

20 September 1966

1860 Munich (West Germany)	8–0	(Cyprus) Omonia
Konietzka 5', 19', 54', 78'; Küppers 8', 35'; Kohlars 25', 63'	Report

Grünwalder Stadion, Munich
Attendance: 9,282
Referee: Ferdinand Marschall (Austria)

28 September 1966

Malmö FF (Sweden)	0–2	(Spain) Atlético Madrid
	Report	Cardona 41'; Aragonés 44'

Malmö Stadion, Malmö
Attendance: 3,776
Referee: Ken Dagnall (England)

28 September 1966

Celtic (Scotland)	2–0	(Switzerland) FC Zürich
Gemmell 61'; McBride 69'	Report

Celtic Park, Glasgow
Attendance: 47,604
Referee: Frede Hansen (Denmark)

28 September 1966

Ajax (Netherlands)	2–0	(Turkey) Beşiktaş
Keizer 16'; Muller 85'	Report

Olympisch Stadion, Amsterdam
Attendance: 50,651
Referee: Jack Taylor (England)

28 September 1966

Liverpool (England)	2–0	(Romania) Petrolul Ploiești
St John 71'; Callaghan 80'	Report

Anfield, Liverpool
Attendance: 44,482
Referee: Joaquim Fernandes Campos (Portugal)

28 September 1966

Esbjerg (Denmark)	0–2	(Czechoslovakia) Dukla Prague
	Report	Enemark 63' (o.g.); Dvořák 67'

Esbjerg Stadion, Esbjerg
Attendance: 6,363
Referee: Fritz Köpcke (East Germany)

28 September 1966

Inter Milan (Italy)	1–0	(Soviet Union) Torpedo Moscow
Mazzola 63'	Report

San Siro, Milan
Attendance: 55,055
Referee: Kurt Tschenscher (West Germany)

28 September 1966

CSKA Red Flag (Bulgaria)	3–1	(Greece) Olympiacos
Penev 64'; Vasilev 71'; Tsanev 90'	Report	Papazoglou 31'

Narodna Army Stadium, Sofia
Attendance: 15,736
Referee: Paul Schiller (Austria)

28 September 1966

Górnik Zabrze (Poland)	2–1	(East Germany) Vorwärts Berlin
Pohl 38', 71'	Report	Fräßdorf 57'

Górnik Stadium, Zabrze
Attendance: 18,023
Referee: Todor Betchirov (Bulgaria)

5 October 1966

Vasas (Hungary)	5–0	(Portugal) Sporting CP
Bakos 29'; Puskás 37', 89'; Farkas 52', 64'	Report

Népstadion, Budapest
Attendance: 65,218
Referee: Bruno de Marchi (Italy)

=== Second leg ===
12 October 1966

Atlético Madrid (Spain)	3–1	(Sweden) Malmö FF
Aragonés 18'; Mendonça 57'; Urtiaga 66'	Report	Svahn 23'

Estadio Manzanares, Madrid
Attendance: 23,869
Referee: Joseph Hannet (Belgium)

Atlético Madrid won 5–1 on aggregate.

20 September 1966

Vojvodina (Socialist Federal Republic of Yugoslavia)	0–0	(Austria) Admira-NÖ Energie Wien
	Report

Gradski Stadium, Novi Sad
Attendance: 11,822
Referee: Karl Göppel (Switzerland)

Vojvodina won 1–0 on aggregate.

5 October 1966

Nantes (France)	5–2	(Iceland) KR
Suaudeau 8'; Simon 9'; Magny 42', 65'; Michel 63'	Report	Baldvinsson 58'; Markan 77'

Stade Marcel Saupin, Nantes
Attendance: 8,087
Referee: Marcel Zeimes (Luxembourg)

Nantes won 8–4 on aggregate.

5 October 1966

FC Zürich (Switzerland)	0–3	(Scotland) Celtic
	Report	Gemmell 22', 48' (pen.); Chalmers 39'

Letzigrund, Zurich
Attendance: 20,236
Referee: Concetto Lo Bello (Italy)

Celtic won 5–0 on aggregate.

5 October 1966

Beşiktaş (Turkey)	1–2	(Netherlands) Ajax
Karadoğan 53'	Report	Swart 61'; Keizer 89'

Mithat Paşa Stadyumu, Istanbul
Attendance: 34,119
Referee: Kostadin Dinov (Bulgaria)

Ajax won 4–1 on aggregate.

12 October 1966

Petrolul Ploiești (Romania)	3–1	(England) Liverpool
Moldoveanu 36'; Boc 59'; Dridea 65'	Report	Hunt 50'

Stadionul Petrolul, Ploiești
Attendance: 10,857
Referee: Ivan Lukhyanov (Soviet Union)

3–3 on aggregate.

Play-off

19 October 1966

Liverpool (England)	2–0	(Romania) Petrolul Ploiești
St. John 13'; Thompson 43'	Report

Heysel Stadium, Brussels
Attendance: 10,482
Referee: Vital Loraux (Belgium)

Liverpool won 2–0 in a play-off match.

4 October 1966

Dukla Prague (Czechoslovakia)	4–0	(Denmark) Esbjerg
Štrunc 17'; Vacenovský 44', 57'; Mráz 47'	Report

Juliska Stadium Prague
Attendance: 1,827
Referee: Konstantin Zečević (Yugoslavia)

Dukla Prague won 6–0 on aggregate.

28 September 1966

Anderlecht (Belgium)	2–0	(Finland) Haka
Van Himst 25'; Devrindt 61'	Report

Émile Versé Stadium, Anderlecht
Attendance: 15,933
Referee: Juan Gardeazábal Garay (Spain)

Anderlecht won 12–1 on aggregate.

12 October 1966

Torpedo Moscow (Soviet Union)	0–0	(Italy) Inter Milan
	Report

Central Lenin Stadium, Moscow
Attendance: 75,618
Referee: Daniel María Zariquiegui Izco (Spain)

Inter Milan won 1–0 on aggregate.

12 October 1966

Sporting CP (Portugal)	0–2	(Hungary) Vasas
	Report	Pál 80'; Puskás 88'

José Alvalade Stadium, Lisbon
Attendance: 11,852
Referee: Gottfried Dienst (Switzerland)

Vasas won 7–0 on aggregate.

25 September 1966

Omonia (Cyprus)	1–2	(West Germany) 1860 Munich
Haralampous 79'	Report	Kohlars 33'; Brunnenmeier 60' (pen.)

Rottal-Stadion an der Keltenstraße, Pocking
Attendance: 4,973
Referee: Corneliu Niţescu (Romania)

1860 Munich won 10–1 on aggregate.

14 September 1966

Linfield (Northern Ireland)	6–1	(Luxembourg) Aris Bonnevoie
Thomas 8', 24', 70'; Scott 16', 82'; Pavis 81'	Report	Schreiner 83'

Windsor Park, Belfast
Attendance: 8,930
Referee: Laurens van Ravens (Netherlands)

Linfield won 9–4 on aggregate.

5 October 1966

Olympiacos (Greece)	1–0	(Bulgaria) CSKA Red Flag
Sideris 15' (pen.)	Report

Georgios Karaiskakis Stadium, Piraeus
Attendance: 40,000
Referee: Gyula Gere (Hungary)

CSKA Red Flag won 3–2 on aggregate.

12 October 1966

Vorwärts Berlin (East Germany)	2–1	(Poland) Górnik Zabrze
Piepenburg 24'; Nöldner 31'	Report	Lubański 38'

Friedrich-Ludwig-Jahn-Sportpark, Berlin
Attendance: 17,879
Referee: Martti Hirviniemi (Finland)

3–3 on aggregate.

26 October 1966

Górnik Zabrze (Poland)	3–1	(East Germany) Vorwärts Berlin
Lubański 7', 54'; Pohl 22'	Report	Kalinke 74'

Hungária körút Stadion, Budapest
Attendance: 6,215
Referee: István Zsolt (Hungary)

Górnik Zabrze won 3–1 in a play-off match.

== Second round ==
Team 1	Agg.	Team 2	1st leg	2nd leg	Play-off
Vojvodina (Socialist Federal Republic of Yugoslavia)	3–3	(Spain) Atlético Madrid	3–1	0–2	3–2
Nantes (France)	2–6	(Scotland) Celtic	1–3	1–3	
Ajax (Netherlands)	7–3	(England) Liverpool	5–1	2–2	
Dukla Prague (Czechoslovakia)	6–2	(Belgium) Anderlecht	4–1	2–1	
Inter Milan (Italy)	4–1	(Hungary) Vasas	2–1	2–0	
1860 Munich (West Germany)	2–3	(Spain) Real Madrid	1–0	1–3	
Vålerenga (Norway)	2–5	(Northern Ireland) Linfield	1–4	1–1	
CSKA Red Flag (Bulgaria)	4–3	(Poland) Górnik Zabrze	4–0	0–3	

=== First leg ===
16 November 1966

Vojvodina (Socialist Federal Republic of Yugoslavia)	3–1	(Spain) Atlético Madrid
Takač 13'; Pantelić 73' (pen.); Brzić 80'	Report	Aragonés 55' (pen.)

Gradski Stadium, Novi Sad
Attendance: 9,488
Referee: Nicolae Mihăilescu (Romania)

30 November 1966

Nantes (France)	1–3	(Scotland) Celtic
Magny 17'	Report	McBride 25'; Lennox 50'; Chalmers 66'

Stade Marcel Saupin, Nantes
Attendance: 15,464
Referee: Joaquim Fernandes Campos (Portugal)

7 December 1966

Ajax (Netherlands)	5–1	(England) Liverpool
De Wolf 3'; Cruyff 17'; Nuninga 38', 42'; Groot 75'	Report	Lawler 89'

Olympisch Stadion, Amsterdam
Attendance: 55,722
Referee: Antonio Sbardella (Italy)

17 November 1966

Dukla Prague (Czechoslovakia)	4–1	(Belgium) Anderlecht
Masopust 27'; Nedorost 44', 56'; Mráz 49'	Report	Mulder 16'

Juliska Stadium, Prague
Attendance: 7,917
Referee: Pierre Schwinte (France)

16 November 1966

Inter Milan (Italy)	2–1	(Hungary) Vasas
Soldo 59'; Corso 85'	Report	Puskás 82'

San Siro, Milan
Attendance: 29,207
Referee: Gottfried Dienst (Switzerland)

16 November 1966

1860 Munich (West Germany)	1–0	(Spain) Real Madrid
Küppers 39'	Report

Grünwalder Stadion, Munich
Attendance: 30,901
Referee: Kevin Howley (England)

25 October 1966

Vålerenga (Norway)	1–4	(Northern Ireland) Linfield
Larsen 8'	Report	Scott 23'; Pavis 25'; Thomas 27' (pen.); Shields 33'

Bislett Stadion, Oslo
Attendance: 7,312
Referee: Fritz Köpcke (East Germany)

23 November 1966

CSKA Red Flag (Bulgaria)	4–0	(Poland) Górnik Zabrze
Marashliev 31', 44'; Tsanev 71' (pen.); Vasilev 89'	Report

Narodna Army Stadium, Sofia
Attendance: 27,829
Referee: Gyula Emsberger (Hungary)

=== Second leg ===
14 December 1966

Atlético Madrid (Spain)	2–0	(Socialist Federal Republic of Yugoslavia) Vojvodina
Aragonés 33' (pen.); Adelardo 43'	Report

Estadio Manzanares, Madrid
Attendance: 34,172
Referee: Leo Callaghan (Wales)

3–3 on aggregate.

Play-off

21 December 1966

Atlético Madrid (Spain)	2–3 (a.e.t.)	(Socialist Federal Republic of Yugoslavia) Vojvodina
Adelardo 3'; Collar 6'	Report	Takač 28', 102'; Radović 65'

Estadio Manzanares, Madrid
Attendance: 38,172
Referee: William O'Neill (Northern Ireland)

Vojvodina won 3–2 in a play-off match.

7 December 1966

Celtic (Scotland)	3–1	(France) Nantes
Johnstone 15'; Chalmers 57'; Lennox 78'	Report	Georgin 43'

Celtic Park, Glasgow
Attendance: 39,120
Referee: Johan Einar Boström (Sweden)

Celtic won 6–2 on aggregate.

14 December 1966

Liverpool (England)	2–2	(Netherlands) Ajax
Hunt 55', 86'	Report	Cruyff 49', 71'

Anfield, Liverpool
Attendance: 53,778
Referee: Josef Krňávek (Czechoslovakia)

Ajax won 7–3 on aggregate.

7 December 1966

Anderlecht (Belgium)	1–2	(Czechoslovakia) Dukla Prague
Mulder 59'	Report	Nedorost 42'; Mráz 69'

Émile Versé Stadium, Brussels
Attendance: 31,418
Referee: José María Ortiz de Mendíbil (Spain)

Dukla Prague won 6–2 on aggregate.

8 December 1966

Vasas (Hungary)	0–2	(Italy) Inter Milan
	Report	Mazzola 40', 67'

Népstadion, Budapest
Attendance: 67,013
Referee: Rudolf Kreitlein (West Germany)

Inter Milan won 4–1 on aggregate.

30 November 1966

Real Madrid (Spain)	3–1	(West Germany) 1860 Munich
Grosso 21'; Veloso 34'; Pirri 52'	Report	Brunnenmeier 13'

Santiago Bernabéu, Madrid
Attendance: 26,151
Referee: Eduard Babauczek (Austria)

Real Madrid won 3–2 on aggregate.

8 November 1966

Linfield (Northern Ireland)	1–1	(Norway) Vålerenga
Thomas 20'	Report	Larsen 82'

Windsor Park, Belfast
Attendance: 6,735
Referee: Adrianus Bogaerts (Netherlands)

Linfield won 5–2 on aggregate.

7 December 1966

Górnik Zabrze (Poland)	3–0	(Bulgaria) CSKA Red Flag
Szołtysik 1'; Pohl 26', 44'	Report

Górnik Stadium, Zabrze
Attendance: 15,613
Referee: Sergei Alimov (Soviet Union)

CSKA Red Flag won 4–3 on aggregate.

== Quarter-finals ==
Team 1	Agg.	Team 2	1st leg	2nd leg
Vojvodina (Socialist Federal Republic of Yugoslavia)	1–2	(Scotland) Celtic	1–0	0–2
Ajax (Netherlands)	2–3	(Czechoslovakia) Dukla Prague	1–1	1–2
Inter Milan (Italy)	3–0	(Spain) Real Madrid	1–0	2–0
Linfield (Northern Ireland)	2–3	(Bulgaria) CSKA Red Flag	2–2	0–1

=== First leg ===
1 March 1967

Vojvodina (Socialist Federal Republic of Yugoslavia)	1–0	(Scotland) Celtic
Stanić 70'	Report

Gradski Stadium, Novi Sad
Attendance: 24,000
Referee: Paul Schiller (Austria)

1 March 1967

Ajax (Netherlands)	1–1	(Czechoslovakia) Dukla Prague
Swart 50'	Report	Mráz 61'

Olympisch Stadion, Amsterdam
Attendance: 55,765
Referee: Tofik Bakhramov (Soviet Union)

15 February 1967

Inter Milan (Italy)	1–0	(Spain) Real Madrid
Cappellini 54'	Report

San Siro, Milan
Attendance: 52,726
Referee: István Zsolt (Hungary)

1 March 1967

Linfield (Northern Ireland)	2–2	(Bulgaria) CSKA Red Flag
Hamilton 40'; Shields 43'	Report	Romanov 2', 63'

Windsor Park, Belfast
Attendance: 10,136
Referee: Aníbal da Silva Oliveira (Portugal)

=== Second leg ===
8 March 1967

Celtic (Scotland)	2–0	(Socialist Federal Republic of Yugoslavia) Vojvodina
Chalmers 58'; McNeill 90'	Report

Celtic Park, Glasgow
Attendance: 69,374
Referee: Hans Carlsson (Sweden)

Celtic won 2–1 on aggregate.

8 March 1967

Dukla Prague (Czechoslovakia)	2–1	(Netherlands) Ajax
Štrunc 72' (pen.); Soetekouw 87' (o.g.)	Report	Swart 65'

Juliska Stadium, Prague
Attendance: 18,419
Referee: Kurt Tschenscher (West Germany)

Dukla Prague won 3–2 on aggregate.

1 March 1967

Real Madrid (Spain)	0–2	(Italy) Inter Milan
	Report	Cappellini 24'; Zoco 57' (o.g.)

Santiago Bernabéu, Madrid
Attendance: 88,934
Referee: Gottfried Dienst (Switzerland)

Inter Milan won 3–0 on aggregate.

15 March 1967

CSKA Red Flag (Bulgaria)	1–0	(Northern Ireland) Linfield
Yakimov 54'	Report

Narodna Army Stadium, Sofia
Attendance: 29,290
Referee: Faruk Talu (Turkey)

CSKA Red Flag won 3–2 on aggregate.

== Semi-finals ==
Team 1	Agg.	Team 2	1st leg	2nd leg	Play-off
Celtic (Scotland)	3–1	(Czechoslovakia) Dukla Prague	3–1	0–0	
Inter Milan (Italy)	2–2	(Bulgaria) CSKA Red Flag	1–1	1–1	1–0

=== First leg ===
12 April 1967

Celtic (Scotland)	3–1	(Czechoslovakia) Dukla Prague
Johnstone 27'; Wallace 59', 65'	Report	Štrunc 44'

Celtic Park, Glasgow
Attendance: 74,406
Referee: Joaquim Fernandes Campos (Portugal)

19 April 1967

Inter Milan (Italy)	1–1	(Bulgaria) CSKA Red Flag
Facchetti 44'	Report	Tsanev 65'

San Siro, Milan
Attendance: 67,103
Referee: Dimitris Wlachojanis (Austria)

=== Second leg ===
25 April 1967

Dukla Prague (Czechoslovakia)	0–0	(Scotland) Celtic
	Report

Juliska Stadium, Prague
Attendance: 19,157
Referee: Gottfried Dienst (Switzerland)

Celtic won 3–1 on aggregate.

26 April 1967

CSKA Red Flag (Bulgaria)	1–1	(Italy) Inter Milan
Radlev 77'	Report	Facchetti 62'

Vasil Levski National Stadium, Sofia
Attendance: 51,557
Referee: Daniel María Zariquiegui Izco (Spain)

2–2 on aggregate.

Play-off

3 May 1967

Inter Milan (Italy)	1–0	(Bulgaria) CSKA Red Flag
Cappellini 12'	Report

Stadio Comunale, Bologna
Attendance: 29,251
Referee: Gottfried Dienst (Switzerland)

== Final ==
25 May 1967

Inter Milan (Italy)	1–2	(Scotland) Celtic
Mazzola 7' (pen.)	Report	Gemmell 62'; Chalmers 85'

Estádio Nacional, Lisbon
Attendance: 45,000
Referee: Kurt Tschenscher (West Germany)

== Top scorers ==
The top scorers from the 1966–67 European Cup (excluding preliminary round) were as follows:

Rank	Player	Team	Goals
1	(Belgium) Paul Van Himst	(Belgium) Anderlecht	6
2	(Scotland) Stevie Chalmers	(Scotland) Celtic	5
2	(Poland) Ernest Pohl	(Poland) Górnik Zabrze	5
2	(Northern Ireland) Arthur Thomas	(Northern Ireland) Linfield	5
5	(Spain) Luis Aragonés	(Spain) Atlético Madrid	4
5	(Belgium) Johan Devrindt	(Belgium) Anderlecht	4
5	(Scotland) Tommy Gemmell	(Scotland) Celtic	4
5	(West Germany) Friedhelm Konietzka	(West Germany) 1860 Munich	4
5	(Italy) Sandro Mazzola	(Italy) Inter Milan	4
5	(Czechoslovakia) Ivan Mráz	(Czechoslovakia) Dukla Prague	4
5	(Hungary) Lajos Puskás	(Hungary) Vasas	4
5	(Northern Ireland) Phil Scott	(Northern Ireland) Linfield	4
5	(Socialist Federal Republic of Yugoslavia) Silvester Takač	(Socialist Federal Republic of Yugoslavia) Vojvodina	4
