= 1961–62 European Cup Winners' Cup =

Tournament details
- Teams: 23

Final positions
- Champions: (Spain) Atlético Madrid (1st title)
- Runners-up: (Italy) Fiorentina

Tournament statistics
- Matches played: 44
- Goals scored: 171 (3.89 per match)
- Top scorer(s): János Göröcs (Újpest Dózsa); 8 goals

The 1961–62 season of the European Cup Winners' Cup club football tournament was won by Atlético Madrid of Spain in a replayed final against holders Fiorentina. It was the first season of the tournament to be directly organised by UEFA.

== Teams ==
(Austria) Rapid Wien (CW)	(Bulgaria) Spartak Varna (CR)	(Czechoslovakia) Žilina (CR)	(Denmark) Aarhus (CW)
(England) Leicester City (CR)	(France) Sedan (CW)	(East Germany) Carl Zeiss Jena (CW)	(West Germany) Werder Bremen (CW)
(Greece) Olympiacos (CW)	(Hungary) Újpest (2nd)	(Republic of Ireland) St Patrick's Athletic (CW)	(Italy) Fiorentina (CW)^{TH}
(Luxembourg) Alliance Dudelange (CW)	(Malta) Floriana (CW)	(Netherlands) Ajax (CW)	(Northern Ireland) Glenavon (CW)
(Portugal) Leixões (CW)	(Romania) Progresul București (CW)	(Scotland) Dunfermline Athletic (CW)	(Spain) Atlético Madrid (CW)
(Switzerland) La Chaux-de-Fonds (CW)	(Wales) Swansea (CW)	(Socialist Federal Republic of Yugoslavia) FK Vardar (CW)	

== Bracket ==
Preliminary round
(Wales) Swansea	2	1	3
(East Germany) Carl Zeiss Jena	2	5	7
(Switzerland) La Chaux-de-Fonds	6	0	6
(Portugal) Leixões	2	5	7
(Northern Ireland) Glenavon	1	1	2
(England) Leicester City	4	3	7
(France) Sedan	2	1	3
(Spain) Atlético Madrid	3	4	7
(Austria) Rapid Wien	0	5	5
(Bulgaria) Spartak Varna	0	2	2
(Malta) Floriana	2	2	4
(Hungary) Újpest	5	10	15
(Scotland) Dunfermline Athletic	4	4	8
(Republic of Ireland) St Patrick's Athletic	1	0	1

First round
(East Germany) Carl Zeiss Jena	7	2	9
(Luxembourg) Alliance Dudelange	0	2	2
(Portugal) Leixões	1	1	2
(Romania) Progresul București	1	0	1
(West Germany) Werder Bremen	2	3	5
(Denmark) Aarhus	0	2	2
(England) Leicester City	1	0	1
(Spain) Atlético Madrid	1	2	3
(Greece) Olympiacos	2	0	2
(Czechoslovakia) Žilina	3	1	4
(Italy) Fiorentina	3	6	9
(Austria) Rapid Wien	1	2	3
(Netherlands) Ajax	2	1	3
(Hungary) Újpest	1	3	4
(Scotland) Dunfermline Athletic	5	0	5
(Socialist Federal Republic of Yugoslavia) FK Vardar	0	2	2

Quarter-finals
(East Germany) Carl Zeiss Jena	1	3	4
(Portugal) Leixões	1	1	2
(West Germany) Werder Bremen	1	1	2
(Spain) Atlético Madrid	1	3	4
(Czechoslovakia) Žilina	3	0	3
(Italy) Fiorentina	2	2	4
(Hungary) Újpest	4	1	5
(Scotland) Dunfermline Athletic	3	0	3

Semi-finals
(East Germany) Carl Zeiss Jena	0	0	0
(Spain) Atlético Madrid	1	4	5
(Italy) Fiorentina	2	1	3
(Hungary) Újpest	0	0	0

Final
(Spain) Atlético Madrid	1/3
(Italy) Fiorentina	1/0

== Qualifying phase ==
=== Preliminary round ===
==== Summary ====
Team 1	Agg.	Team 2	1st leg	2nd leg
Swansea Town (Wales)	3–7	(East Germany) Motor Jena	2–2 (Report) (Report 2)	1–5 (Report) (Report 2)
La Chaux-de-Fonds (Switzerland)	6–7	(Portugal) Leixões	6–2 (Report) (Report 2)	0–5 (Report) (Report 2)
Glenavon (Northern Ireland)	2–7	(England) Leicester City	1–4 (Report) (Report 2)	1–3 (Report) (Report 2)
Sedan (France)	3–7	(Spain) Atlético Madrid	2–3 (Report) (Report 2)	1–4 (Report) (Report 2)
Rapid Wien (Austria)	5–2	(Bulgaria) Spartak Varna	0–0 (Report) (Report 2)	5–2 (Report) (Report 2)
Floriana (Malta)	4–15	(Hungary) Újpest Dózsa	2–5 (Report) (Report 2)	2–10 (Report) (Report 2)
Dunfermline Athletic (Scotland)	8–1	(Republic of Ireland) St Patrick's Athletic	4–1 (Report) (Report 2)	4–0 (Report) (Report 2)

==== Matches ====
===== First leg =====
16 October 1961

Swansea Town (Wales)	2–2	(East Germany) Motor Jena
Reynolds 16'; Nurse 70' (pen.)		Lange 14'; R. Ducke 32'

Linzer Stadion, Linz
Referee: Fritz Seipelt (Austria)

7 September 1961

La Chaux-de-Fonds (Switzerland)	6–2	(Portugal) Leixões
Antenen 8'; Sommerlatt 25'; Bertschi 51', 67'; Jäger 52', 57'		Oliveirinha 42', 86'

Stade de la Charrière, La Chaux-de-Fonds
Attendance: 3,194
Referee: Pierre Schwinte (France)

13 September 1961

Glenavon (Northern Ireland)	1–4	(England) Leicester City
Jones 14'		Walsh 36', 42'; Appleton 37'; Keyworth 62'

Mourneview Park, Lurgan
Referee: George Bowman (Scotland)

13 September 1961

Sedan (France)	2–3	(Spain) Atlético Madrid
Hatchi 51'; Fulgenzi 57'		Collar 13'; Adelardo 17'; Mendonça 38'

Stade Émile Albeau, Sedan
Referee: Johannes Malka (West Germany)

13 September 1961

Rapid Wien (Austria)	0–0	(Bulgaria) Spartak Varna

Praterstadion, Vienna
Referee: Pietro Bonetto (Italy)

17 September 1961

Floriana (Malta)	2–5	(Hungary) Újpest Dózsa
Cauchi 63', 87'		Göröcs 7'; Rossi 16'; Kuharszki 30', 74'; Solymosi 85'

Empire Stadium, Gżira
Referee: Raul Righi (Italy)

12 September 1961

Dunfermline Athletic (Scotland)	4–1	(Republic of Ireland) St Patrick's Athletic
Melrose 15'; Peebles 23'; Dickson 28'; McDonald 87'	Report	O'Rourke 38'

East End Park, Dunfermline
Attendance: 18,890
Referee: Arthur Holland (England)

===== Second leg =====
18 October 1961

Motor Jena (East Germany)	5–1	(Wales) Swansea Town
Müller 15', 26'; Lange 61'; P. Ducke 75'; R. Ducke 80'		Reynolds 8'

Ernst-Abbe-Sportfeld, Jena
Referee: Leo Horn (Netherlands)

Motor Jena won 7–3 on aggregate.

5 October 1961

Leixões (Portugal)	5–0	(Switzerland) La Chaux-de-Fonds
Osvaldo Silva 24', 30'; Oliveirinha 46', 71'; Ventura 52'

Campo de Santana, Matosinhos
Attendance: 3,747
Referee: Jean Tricot (France)

Leixões won 7–6 on aggregate.

27 September 1961

Leicester City (England)	3–1	(Northern Ireland) Glenavon
Wills 55'; Keyworth 70'; McIlmoyle 82'		Wilson 74'

Filbert Street, Leicester
Referee: Tom Wharton (Scotland)

Leicester City won 7–2 on aggregate.

27 September 1961

Atlético Madrid (Spain)	4–1	(France) Sedan
Peiró 25', 38'; Mendonça 27'; Adelardo 75'		Salaber 89'

Estadio Metropolitano, Madrid
Referee: Albert Dusch (West Germany)

Atlético Madrid won 7–3 on aggregate.

27 September 1961

Spartak Varna (Bulgaria)	2–5	(Austria) Rapid Wien
Kostov 63' (pen.), 68'		Schmid 7', 84'; Skocik 30'; Flögel 46'; Milanović 56'

Yuri Gagarin Stadium, Varna
Referee: Giuseppe Adami (Italy)

Rapid Wien won 5–2 on aggregate.

27 September 1961

Újpest Dózsa (Hungary)	10–2	(Malta) Floriana
Göröcs 13', 43', 47', 58'; Solymosi 22', 63', 71', 87'; Kuharszki 29', 38'		Dalli 41'; Cauchi 69'

Népstadion, Budapest
Referee: Panagiotis Nikiforakis (Greece)

Újpest Dózsa won 15–4 on aggregate.

27 September 1961

St Patrick's Athletic (Republic of Ireland)	0–4	(Scotland) Dunfermline Athletic
	Report	Peebles 1' 80'; Dickson 25' 31'

Tolka Park, Dublin
Attendance: 6,220
Referee: Arthur Holland (England)

Dunfermline Athletic won 8–1 on aggregate.

== First round ==
Team 1	Agg.	Team 2	1st leg	2nd leg
Motor Jena (East Germany)	9–2	(Luxembourg) Alliance Dudelange	7–0 (Report) (Report 2)	2–2 (Report) (Report 2)
Leixões (Portugal)	2–1	(Romania) Progresul București	1–1 (Report) (Report 2)	1–0 (Report) (Report 2)
Werder Bremen (West Germany)	5–2	(Denmark) AGF	2–0 (Report) (Report 2)	3–2 (Report) (Report 2)
Leicester City (England)	1–3	(Spain) Atlético Madrid	1–1 (Report) (Report 2)	0–2 (Report) (Report 2)
Olympiacos (Greece)	2–4	(Czechoslovakia) Dynamo Žilina	2–3 (Report) (Report 2)	0–1 (Report) (Report 2)
Fiorentina (Italy)	9–3	(Austria) Rapid Wien	3–1 (Report) (Report 2)	6–2 (Report) (Report 2)
Ajax (Netherlands)	3–4	(Hungary) Újpest Dózsa	2–1 (Report) (Report 2)	1–3 (Report) (Report 2)
Dunfermline Athletic (Scotland)	5–2	(Socialist Federal Republic of Yugoslavia) FK Vardar	5–0 (Report) (Report 2)	0–2 (Report) (Report 2)

=== First leg ===
17 December 1961

Motor Jena (East Germany)	7–0	(Luxembourg) Alliance Dudelange
Kirsch 1', 28'; Müller 41'; Lange 47', 64'; P. Ducke 63'; Piccini 72' (o.g.)

Ernst-Abbe-Sportfeld, Jena
Referee: Piet Roomer (Netherlands)

23 November 1961

Leixões (Portugal)	1–1	(Romania) Progresul București
Silva 52'	Report	Karikaș 19'

Estádio José Alvalade, Lisbon
Attendance: 7,226
Referee: Josef Stoll (Austria)

25 October 1961

Werder Bremen (West Germany)	2–0	(Denmark) AGF
Barth 7'; Schütz 76'

Weserstadion, Bremen
Referee: Erik Johansson (Sweden)

25 October 1961

Leicester City (England)	1–1	(Spain) Atlético Madrid
Keyworth 56'		Mendonça 89'

Filbert Street, Leicester
Referee: Pierre Schwinte (France)

22 November 1961

Olympiacos (Greece)	2–3	(Czechoslovakia) Dynamo Žilina
Sideris 15', 49'		Pisárik 4'; Mravec 28'; David 87'

Karaiskakis Stadium, Piraeus
Referee: Andor Dorogi (Hungary)

25 October 1961

Fiorentina (Italy)	3–1	(Austria) Rapid Wien
Milani 12'; Hamrin 49'; Jonsson 68'		Seitl 81'

Stadio Artemio Franchi, Florence
Referee: Gottfried Dienst (Switzerland)

2 November 1961

Ajax (Netherlands)	2–1	(Hungary) Újpest Dózsa
Groot 3', 20'		Kuharszki 81'

Olympic Stadium, Amsterdam
Referee: Werner Treichel (West Germany)

25 October 1961

Dunfermline Athletic (Scotland)	5–0	(Socialist Federal Republic of Yugoslavia) FK Vardar
Smith 7'; Dickson 28', 43'; Melrose 56'; Peebles 84'

East End Park, Dunfermline
Referee: Jozef Casteleyn (Belgium)

=== Second leg ===
19 December 1961

Alliance Dudelange (Luxembourg)	2–2	(East Germany) Motor Jena
Cirelli 39'; Bellion 53'		Kirsch 72'; P. Ducke 76'

Georgij-Dimitroff-Stadion, Erfurt
Referee: Piet Roomer (Netherlands)

Motor Jena won 9–2 on aggregate.

30 November 1961

Progresul București (Romania)	0–1	(Portugal) Leixões
	Report	Silva 61'

Stadionul 23 August, Bucharest
Attendance: 40,000
Referee: Franz Mayer (Austria)

Leixões won 2–1 on aggregate.

1 November 1961

AGF (Denmark)	2–3	(West Germany) Werder Bremen
Amdisen 66'; Jensen 87'		Barth 36'; Hänel 49'; Lorenz 71'

Aarhus Stadium, Aarhus
Referee: Erik Johansson (Sweden)

Werder Bremen won 5–2 on aggregate.

15 November 1961

Atlético Madrid (Spain)	2–0	(England) Leicester City
Collar 60' (pen.); Jones 75'

Estadio Metropolitano, Madrid
Referee: Michel Kitabdjian (France)

Atlético Madrid won 3–1 on aggregate.

30 November 1961

Dynamo Žilina (Czechoslovakia)	1–0	(Greece) Olympiacos
Pisárik 16'

Štadión pod Dubňom, Žilina
Referee: Gyula Gere (Hungary)

Dynamo Žilina won 4–2 on aggregate.

22 November 1961

Rapid Wien (Austria)	2–6	(Italy) Fiorentina
Schmid 85', 89'		Milani 28', 59', 70'; Dell'Angelo 42'; Jonsson 50'; Hamrin 65'

Praterstadion, Vienna
Referee: Daniel Mellet (Switzerland)

Fiorentina won 9–3 on aggregate.

29 November 1961

Újpest Dózsa (Hungary)	3–1	(Netherlands) Ajax
Bene 15'; Göröcs 65', 68'		Petersen 82'

Népstadion, Budapest
Referee: Johannes Malka (West Germany)

Újpest Dózsa won 4–3 on aggregate.

8 November 1961

FK Vardar (Socialist Federal Republic of Yugoslavia)	2–0	(Scotland) Dunfermline Athletic
Šulinčevski 11'; Jakimovski 75'

Gradski Stadion, Skopje
Referee: Dimitar Rumenchev (Bulgaria)

Dunfermline Athletic won 5–2 on aggregate.

== Quarter-finals ==
Team 1	Agg.	Team 2	1st leg	2nd leg
Motor Jena (East Germany)	4–2	(Portugal) Leixões	1–1 (Report) (Report 2)	3–1^{1} (Report) (Report 2)
Werder Bremen (West Germany)	2–4	(Spain) Atlético Madrid	1–1 (Report) (Report 2)	1–3 (Report) (Report 2)
Dynamo Žilina (Czechoslovakia)	3–4	(Italy) Fiorentina	3–2 (Report) (Report 2)	0–2 (Report) (Report 2)
Újpest Dózsa (Hungary)	5–3	(Scotland) Dunfermline Athletic	4–3 (Report) (Report 2)	1–0 (Report) (Report 2)

=== First leg ===
22 February 1962

Motor Jena (East Germany)	1–1	(Portugal) Leixões
Marx 89'		M. Oliveira 44'

Ernst-Abbe-Sportfeld, Jena
Attendance: 14,273
Referee: Milan Kusák (Czechoslovakia)

17 January 1962

Werder Bremen (West Germany)	1–1	(Spain) Atlético Madrid
Soya 85'		Jones 71'

Weserstadion, Bremen
Referee: Marcel Raeymaeckers (Belgium)

21 February 1962

Dynamo Žilina (Czechoslovakia)	3–2	(Italy) Fiorentina
Jakubčík 7', 63'; Majerník 42'		Milani 50'; Dell'Angelo 85'

Štadión pod Dubňom, Žilina
Referee: Kurt Tschenscher (West Germany)

13 February 1962

Újpest Dózsa (Hungary)	4–3	(Scotland) Dunfermline Athletic
Bene 1'; Lenkei 30'; Solymosi 74' (pen.); Göröcs 81'		Smith 1'; McDonald 8', 85'

Népstadion, Budapest
Referee: Trajan Ivanovski (Yugoslavia)

=== Second leg ===
25 February 1962

Leixões (Portugal)	1–3	(East Germany) Motor Jena
Osvaldo Silva 56'		Kirsch 8'; Lange 59'; Schreier 80'

Stadion der Freundschaft, Gera
Attendance: 9,738
Referee: Stanislav Fencl (Czechoslovakia)

Motor Jena won 4–2 on aggregate.

Note: Second leg played in Gera after visas denied to the East German players.

28 February 1962

Atlético Madrid (Spain)	3–1	(West Germany) Werder Bremen
Jagielski 2' (o.g.); Peiró 30'; Adelardo 61'		Schröder 37'

Estadio Metropolitano, Madrid
Referee: Josef Gulde (Switzerland)

Atlético Madrid won 4–2 on aggregate.

27 February 1962

Fiorentina (Italy)	2–0	(Czechoslovakia) Dynamo Žilina
Ferretti 38'; Hamrin 41'

Stadio Artemio Franchi, Florence
Referee: Fritz Seipelt (Austria)

Fiorentina won 4–3 on aggregate.

20 February 1962

Dunfermline Athletic (Scotland)	0–1	(Hungary) Újpest Dózsa
		Bene 51'

East End Park, Dunfermline
Referee: Tage Sørensen (Denmark)

Újpest Dózsa won 5–3 on aggregate.

== Semi-finals ==
Team 1	Agg.	Team 2	1st leg	2nd leg
Motor Jena (East Germany)	0–5	(Spain) Atlético Madrid	0–1	0–4
Fiorentina (Italy)	3–0	(Hungary) Újpest Dózsa	2–0	1–0

=== First leg ===
28 March 1962
15:30

Motor Jena (East Germany)	0–1	(Spain) Atlético Madrid
	Report; Report 2	Peiró 61'

Ernst-Abbe-Sportfeld, Jena
Attendance: 27,500
Referee: Bengt Lundell (Sweden)

21 March 1962

Fiorentina (Italy)	2–0	(Hungary) Újpest Dózsa
Hamrin 6', 47'	Report; Report 2

Stadio Artemio Franchi, Florence
Attendance: 4,143
Referee: John Kelly (England)

=== Second leg ===
11 April 1962
19:00

Atlético Madrid (Spain)	4–0	(East Germany) Motor Jena
Mendonça 14', 60'; Jones 18', 54'	Report; Report 2

Malmö Stadion, Malmö
Attendance: 8,000
Referee: Lucien van Nuffel (Belgium)

Atlético Madrid won 5–0 on aggregate.

11 April 1962

Újpest Dózsa (Hungary)	0–1	(Italy) Fiorentina
	Report; Report 2	Bartu 56'

Megyeri úti stadion, Budapest
Attendance: 21,277
Referee: Friedrich Mayer (Austria)

Fiorentina won 3–0 on aggregate.

== Final ==
10 May 1962
19:00

Atlético Madrid (Spain)	1–1 (a.e.t.)	(Italy) Fiorentina
Peiró 11'	Report; Report 2	Hamrin 27'

Hampden Park, Glasgow
Attendance: 27,000
Referee: Tom Wharton (Scotland)

=== Replay ===
5 September 1962
16:30

Atlético Madrid (Spain)	3–0	(Italy) Fiorentina
Jones 8'; Mendonça 27'; Peiró 59'	Report; Report 2

Neckarstadion, Stuttgart
Attendance: 38,000
Referee: Kurt Tschenscher (West Germany)

== Top scorers ==
The top scorers from the 1961–62 European Cup Winners' Cup (including preliminary round) are as follows:

Rank	Name	Team	Goals
1	(Hungary) János Göröcs	(Hungary) Újpest Dózsa	8
2	(Sweden) Kurt Hamrin	(Italy) Fiorentina	6
2	(Portugal) Jorge Mendonça	(Spain) Atlético Madrid	6
2	(Spain) Joaquín Peiró	(Spain) Atlético Madrid	6
2	(Hungary) Ernő Solymosi	(Hungary) Újpest Dózsa	6
6	(Scotland) Charlie Dickson	(Scotland) Dunfermline Athletic	5
6	(Spain) Miguel Jones	(Spain) Atlético Madrid	5
6	(Hungary) Béla Kuharszki	(Hungary) Újpest Dózsa	5
6	(East Germany) Dieter Lange	(East Germany) Carl Zeiss Jena	5
6	(Portugal) Oliveirinha	(Portugal) Leixões	5
6	(Brazil) Osvaldo Silva	(Portugal) Leixões	5

== See also ==
- 1961–62 European Cup
- 1961–62 Inter-Cities Fairs Cup
