= Jorge Griffa =

Argentine footballer (1935–2024)

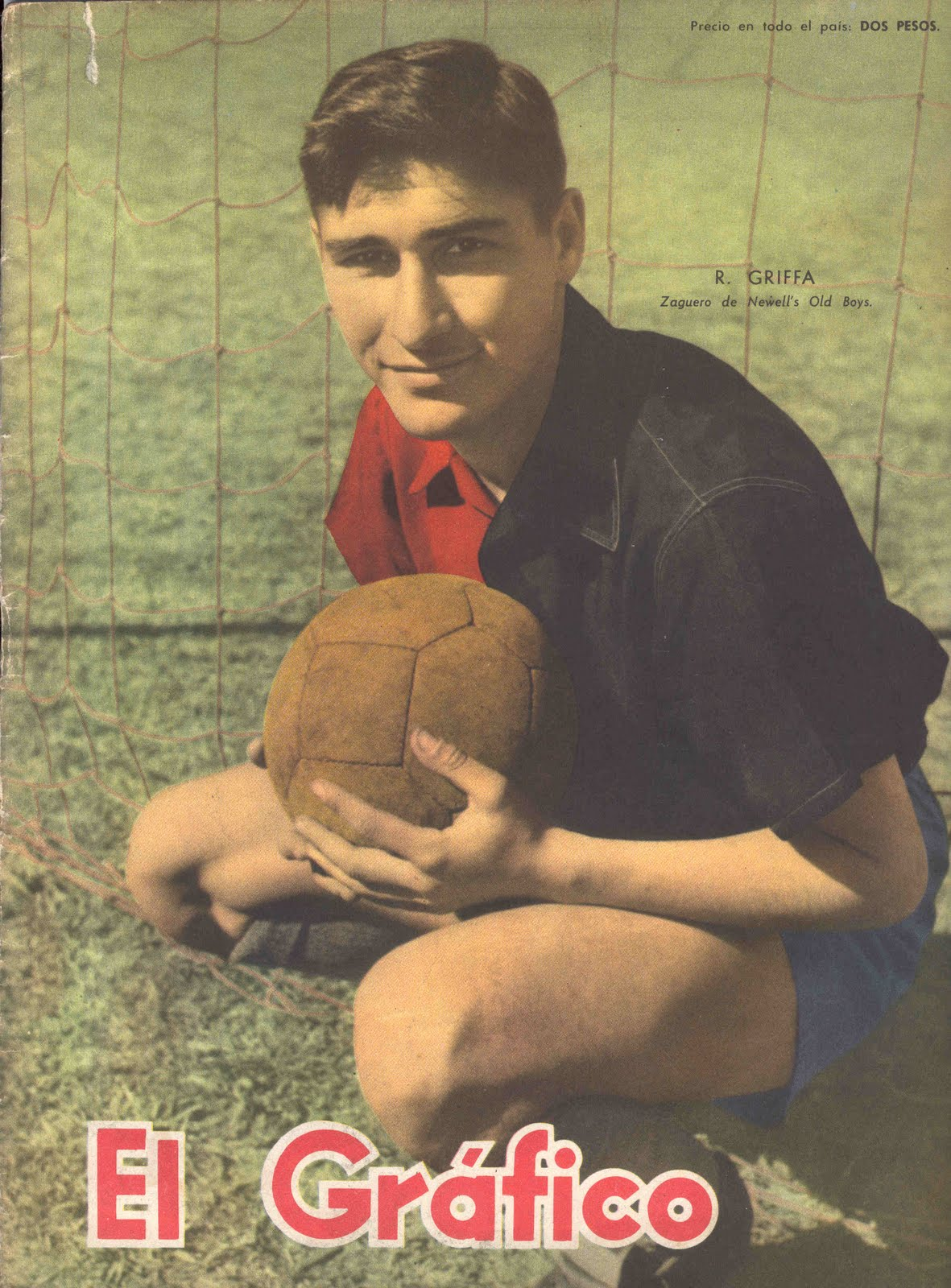
- Griffa in 1956

Personal information
- Full name: Jorge Bernardo Griffa Monferoni
- Date of birth: 7 May 1935
- Place of birth: Casilda, Santa Fe, Argentina
- Date of death: 15 January 2024 (aged 88)
- Place of death: Rosario, Santa Fe, Argentina
- Position: Defender

Senior career*
Years	Team	Apps	(Gls)
1954–1959	Newell's Old Boys	92	(2)
1959–1969	Atlético Madrid	227	(6)
1969–1971	Espanyol	24	(0)

International career
1959	Argentina	4	(0)
- * Club domestic league appearances and goals

Jorge Bernardo Griffa Monferoni (7 May 1935 – 15 January 2024) was an Argentine footballer. A defender, he spent most of his career in Spain, playing mostly for Atlético Madrid, but after retiring, he decided to go back home to Newell's Old Boys and he began coaching its youth teams. Griffa was part of the Argentina squad that won the Copa América in 1959.

Jorge Griffa died in Rosario on 15 January 2024, at the age of 88.

== Honours ==
Atlético Madrid

- Spanish League: 1965–66
- Copa del Generalísimo: 1959–60, 1960–61, 1964–65
- Cup Winners' Cup: 1961–62

Argentina

- South American Championship: 1959
