= 1960–61 Heart of Midlothian F.C. season =

Heart of Midlothian
1960–61 season
- Manager: Tommy Walker
- Stadium: Tynecastle Park
- Scottish First Division: 7th
- Scottish Cup: Round 4
- League Cup: Play-off after Group Stage
- European Cup: Preliminary Round

During the 1960–61 season, Hearts competed in the Scottish First Division, the Scottish Cup, the Scottish League Cup, the European Cup, and the East of Scotland Shield.

== Fixtures ==
=== Friendlies ===
31 October 1960 Testimonial	Hearts	2–2	Raith Rovers	Tynecastle Park
	Goal

7 November 1960 Friendly	Hearts	3–2	British Army	Tynecastle Park
	Goal

20 April 1961 Friendly	Chrinside	0–3	Hearts	Croftfield
	Goal

=== East of Scotland Shield ===
29 March 1961 Final	Hibernian	4–2	Hearts	Easter Road

=== European Cup ===
29 September 1960 European Cup Preliminary round 1st Leg	Hearts	1–2	Benfica	Tynecastle Park
			Goal	Attendance: 29,500

5 October 1960 European Cup Preliminary round 2nd Leg	Benfica	3–0	Hearts	Estádio da Luz
			Goal	Attendance: 30,122

=== League Cup ===
13 August 1960 League Cup Group	Hearts	1–1	St Mirren	Tynecastle Park
				Attendance: 30,000

17 August 1960 League Cup Group	Clyde	2–0	Hearts	Shawfield Stadium
				Attendance: 15,000

20 August 1960 League Cup Group	Motherwell	2–3	Hearts	Fir Park
				Attendance: 22,600

27 August 1960 League Cup Group	St Mirren	3–1	Hearts	St Mirren Park, Love Street
				Attendance: 14,500

31 August 1960 League Cup Group	Hearts	6–2	Clyde	Tynecastle Park
				Attendance: 21,000

3 September 1960 League Cup Group	Hearts	2–1	Motherwell	Tynecastle Park
				Attendance: 35,000

12 September 1960 League Cup Play Off	Clyde	2–1	Hearts	Shawfield Stadium
				Attendance: 23,000

=== Scottish Cup ===
28 January 1961 Scottish Cup R1	Hearts	9–0	Tarff Rovers	Tynecastle Park
				Attendance: 13,309

11 February 1961 Scottish Cup R2	Kilmarnock	1–2	Hearts	Rugby Park
				Attendance: 18,383

25 February 1961 Scottish Cup R3	Partick Thistle	1–2	Hearts	Firhill Park
				Attendance: 22,950

11 March 1961 Scottish Cup R4	Hearts	0–1	St Mirren	Tynecastle Park
				Attendance: 34,325

=== Scottish First Division ===
24 August 1960 Scottish First Division	Hearts	3–1	St Johnstone	Tynecastle Park
				Attendance: 18,000

10 September 1960 Scottish First Division	Hibernian	1–4	Hearts	Easter Road
				Attendance: 40,000

17 September 1960 Scottish First Division	Hearts	1–1	Dunfermline Athletic	Tynecastle Park
				Attendance: 20,000

24 September 1960 Scottish First Division	Airdrieonians	2–2	Hearts	Broomfield Park
				Attendance: 11,000

1 October 1960 Scottish First Division	Hearts	1–1	Dundee United	Tynecastle Park
				Attendance: 15,000

8 October 1960 Scottish First Division	Hearts	0–1	Partick Thistle	Tynecastle Park
				Attendance: 20,000

15 October 1960 Scottish First Division	Ayr United	1–0	Hearts	Somerset Park
				Attendance: 7,000

26 October 1960 Scottish First Division	Hearts	1–3	Rangers	Tynecastle Park
				Attendance: 35,000

29 October 1960 Scottish First Division	Motherwell	1–1	Hearts	Fir Park
				Attendance: 17,000

5 November 1960 Scottish First Division	Hearts	3–4	Aberdeen	Tynecastle Park
				Attendance: 20,000

12 November 1960 Scottish First Division	Kilmarnock	2–1	Hearts	Rugby Park
				Attendance: 13,393

19 November 1960 Scottish First Division	Clyde	1–1	Hearts	Shawfield Stadium
				Attendance: 15,000

26 November 1960 Scottish First Division	Hearts	1–0	Raith Rovers	Tynecastle Park
				Attendance: 17,000

3 December 1960 Scottish First Division	Third Lanark	0–3	Hearts	Cathkin Park
				Attendance: 9,000

10 December 1960 Scottish First Division	St Mirren	2–0	Hearts	St Mirren Park, Love Street
				Attendance: 12,000

17 December 1960 Scottish First Division	Hearts	2–1	Celtic	Tynecastle Park
				Attendance: 24,000

24 December 1960 Scottish First Division	Dundee	2–2	Hearts	Dens Park
				Attendance: 13,000

31 December 1960 Scottish First Division	St Johnstone	2–3	Hearts	Muirton Park
				Attendance: 11,000

2 January 1961 Scottish First Division	Hearts	1–2	Hibernian	Tynecastle Park
				Attendance: 43,000

7 January 1961 Scottish First Division	Dunfermline Athletic	2–1	Hearts	East End Park
				Attendance: 13,000

14 January 1961 Scottish First Division	Hearts	3–1	Airdrieonians	Tynecastle Park
				Attendance: 18,000

21 January 1961 Scottish First Division	Dundee United	3–0	Hearts	Tannadice Park
				Attendance: 12,000

4 February 1961 Scottish First Division	Partick Thistle	4–1	Hearts	Firhill Park
				Attendance: 7,000

18 February 1961 Scottish First Division	Hearts	2–1	Ayr United	Tynecastle Park
				Attendance: 15,000

4 March 1961 Scottish First Division	Hearts	1–5	Motherwell	Tynecastle Park
				Attendance: 22,000

8 March 1961 Scottish First Division	Rangers	3–0	Hearts	Ibrox Park
				Attendance: 30,000

14 March 1961 Scottish First Division	Aberdeen	0–2	Hearts	Pittodrie Park
				Attendance: 11,500

18 March 1961 Scottish First Division	Hearts	0–1	Kilmarnock	Tynecastle Park
				Attendance: 17,000

25 March 1961 Scottish First Division	Hearts	4–2	Clyde	Tynecastle Park
				Attendance: 4,696

1 April 1961 Scottish First Division	Raith Rovers	1–1	Hearts	Stark's Park
				Attendance: 5,000

8 April 1961 Scottish First Division	Hearts	1–0	Third Lanark	Tynecastle Park
				Attendance: 15,000

15 April 1961 Scottish First Division	Hearts	0–0	St Mirren	Tynecastle Park
				Attendance: 12,000

29 April 1961 Scottish First Division	Hearts	2–1	Dundee	Tynecastle Park
				Attendance: 14,000

2 May 1961 Scottish First Division	Celtic	1–3	Hearts	Celtic Park
				Attendance: 7,000

== See also ==
- List of Heart of Midlothian F.C. seasons
