= Edgardo Madinabeytia =

Argentine footballer

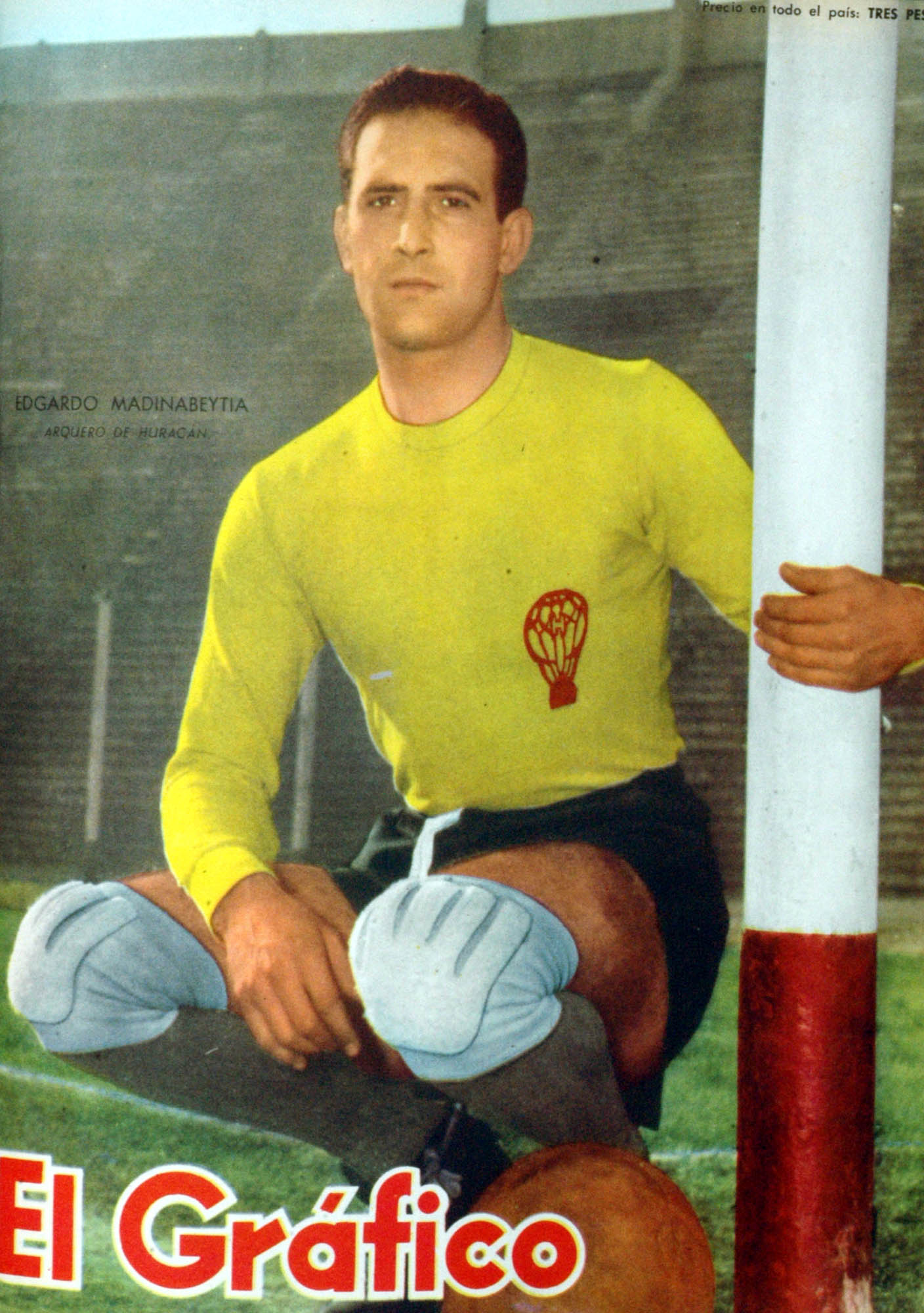
- The Graphic of August 16, 1957.

Personal information
- Full name: Edgardo Mario Madinabeytia Bassi
- Date of birth: 28 August 1932
- Place of birth: San Miguel, Argentina
- Date of death: 15 August 2002 (aged 69)
- Place of death: Buenos Aires, Argentina
- Position: Goalkeeper

Youth career
- 1947–1950: Huracán

Senior career*
Years	Team	Apps	(Gls)
1950–1958	Huracán	102	(0)
1958–1967	Atletico de Madrid	159	(0)
1967–1969	Real Murcia	1	(0)
- * Club domestic league appearances and goals as of November 2008

Edgardo Madinabeytia (28 August 1932 – 15 August 2002) was an Argentine football goalkeeper who won a number of championships with Atletico de Madrid of Spain in the 1960s.

Madinabeytia started his playing career in 1950 with Huracán of the Primera División Argentina he made over 100 appearances for the club before joining Atletico de Madrid in 1958. During his time with Atletico the club won La Liga once, three Copa del Rey and the 1961–62 European Cup Winners' Cup. He made a total of 237 appearances for the club in all competitions.

In 1967, he joined Real Murcia of the Segunda División where he played until his retirement in 1969.

== Honours ==
Atletico de Madrid

- Copa del Rey: 1959–60, 1960–61, 1964–65
- UEFA Cup Winners' Cup: 1961–62
- La Liga: 1965–66
