= Ufarte =

Ufarte is a surname. Notable people with the surname include:

- José Ufarte (born 1941), Spanish footballer
- Roberto López Ufarte (born 1958), Spanish footballer
