= FC Torpedo Moscow in European football =

Russian football club Torpedo Moscow has taken part in many European competitions since the 1960s, including the European Cup, the UEFA Cup Winners' Cup, the UEFA Cup, and the UEFA Intertoto Cup.

The furthest the club has gone in a European competition was reaching the quarter-finals of the 1990–91 UEFA Cup, beating GAIS, Sevilla, and AS Monaco, before losing to Brondby on penalties. The club has participated in European competitions 20 times, with the first coming in the 1966–67 European Cup and the last in the 2003–04 UEFA Cup.

Season	Competition	Round	Opposition	Home	Away	Aggregate
1966–67	European Cup	First Round	(Italy) Inter Milan	0–0	0–1	0–1
1967–68	UEFA Cup Winners' Cup	First round	(East Germany) Motor Zwickau	0–0	1–0	1–0
1967–68	UEFA Cup Winners' Cup	Second Round	(Czechoslovakia) Spartak Trnava	3–0	3–1	6–1
1967–68	UEFA Cup Winners' Cup	Quarter-finals	(Wales) Cardiff City	0–1	1–0 (0–1 playoff)	1–2
1969–70	UEFA Cup Winners' Cup	Preliminary Round	(Austria) Rapid Wien	0–0	1–1	1–1 (away goals)
1973–74	UEFA Cup Winners' Cup	First Round	(Spain) Athletic Bilbao	0–0	0–2	0–2
1975–76	UEFA Cup	First Round	(Italy) Napoli	4–1	1–1	5–2
1975–76	UEFA Cup	Second Round	(Turkey) Galatasaray	4–2	3–0	7–2
1975–76	UEFA Cup	Third Round	(East Germany) Dynamo Dresden	0–3	3–1	3–4
1977–78	European Cup	First Round	(Portugal) Benfica	0–0	0–0	0–0 (1–4 pen.)
1978–79	UEFA Cup	First Round	(Norway) Molde	4–0	3–3	7–3
1978–79	UEFA Cup	Second Round	(West Germany) VfB Stuttgart	2–1	0–2	2–3
1982–83	UEFA Cup Winners' Cup	First Round	(West Germany) Bayern Munich	1–1	0–0	1–1 (away goals)
1986–87	UEFA Cup Winners' Cup	First Round	(Finland) Haka	2–2	3–1	5–3
1986–87	UEFA Cup Winners' Cup	Second Round	(West Germany) VfB Stuttgart	2–0	5–3	7–3
1986–87	UEFA Cup Winners' Cup	Quarter-finals	(France) Bordeaux	0–1	3–2	3–3 (away goals)
1988–89	UEFA Cup	First Round	(Sweden) Malmo	0–2	2–1	2–3
1989–90	UEFA Cup Winners' Cup	First Round	(Republic of Ireland) Cork City	5–0	1–0	6–0
1989–90	UEFA Cup Winners' Cup	Second Round	(Switzerland) Grasshopper	1–1	0–3	1–4
1990–91	UEFA Cup	First Round	(Sweden) GAIS	4–1	1–1	5–2
1990–91	UEFA Cup	Second Round	(Spain) Sevilla	3–1	1–2	4–3
1990–91	UEFA Cup	Third Round	(France) AS Monaco	2–1	2–1	4–2
1990–91	UEFA Cup	Quarter-finals	(Denmark) Brondby	0–1	1–0	1–1 (2–4 pen)
1991–92	UEFA Cup	First Round	(Germany) Hallescher FC	1–2	3–0	4–2
1991–92	UEFA Cup	Second Round	(Czechoslovakia) Sigma Olomouc	0–2	0–0	0–2
1992–93	UEFA Cup	First Round	(England) Manchester United	0–0	0–0	0–0 (4–3 pen.)
1992–93	UEFA Cup	Second Round	(Spain) Real Madrid	3–2	2–5	5–7
1993–94	UEFA Cup Winners' Cup	First Round	(Israel) Maccabi Haifa	1–0	1–3	2–3
1996–97	UEFA Cup	Qualifying Round	(Croatia) Hajduk Split	2–0	0–1	2–1
1996–97	UEFA Cup	First Round	(Georgia (country)) Dinamo Tbilisi	0–1	1–1	1–2
1997	UEFA Intertoto Cup	Group Stage	(Georgia (country)) Merani-91 Tbilisi	–	2–0	1st
1997	UEFA Intertoto Cup	Group Stage	(Greece) Iraklis Thessaloniki	4–1	–	1st
1997	UEFA Intertoto Cup	Group Stage	(Malta) Floriana	–	1–0	1st
1997	UEFA Intertoto Cup	Group Stage	(Austria) Ried	2–0	–	1st
1997	UEFA Intertoto Cup	Semi-finals	(France) Auxerre	4–1	0–3	4–4 (away goals)
2000–01	UEFA Cup	First Round	(Switzerland) Lausanne-Sport	0–2	2–3	2–5
2001–02	UEFA Cup	First Round	(England) Ipswich Town	1–2	1–1	2–3
2003–04	UEFA Cup	Qualifying Round	(San Marino) Domagnano	5–0	4–0	9–0
2003–04	UEFA Cup	First Round	(Bulgaria) CSKA Sofia	1–1	1–1	2–2 (3–2 pen)
2003–04	UEFA Cup	Second Round	(Spain) Villarreal	0–2	1–0	1–2
