= José Cardona =

Honduran footballer (1939-2013)

Personal information
- Full name: José Enrique Gutiérrez Cardona
- Date of birth: 27 February 1939
- Place of birth: La Lima, Cortés, Honduras
- Date of death: 30 January 2013 (aged 73)
- Place of death: San Pedro Sula, Honduras
- Height: 1.76 m (5 ft 9 in)
- Position: Forward

Senior career*
Years	Team	Apps	(Gls)
- Hibueras
1957–1958	Lusitano Évora	21	(4)
1958–1964	Elche	89	(54)
1964–1969	Atlético Madrid	109	(44)
1970	Real España	10	(3)

International career
- Honduras
- * Club domestic league appearances and goals

José Enrique Gutiérrez Cardona (27 February 1939 - 30 January 2013), more commonly known as Cardona or Indio Cardona or Coneja Cardona, was a professional footballer.

== Early career ==
Cardona was born in La Lima, Honduras. In 1957 he was National Football Champion and Top Scorer. A year later, he was transferred to Portuguese club Lusitano.

In 1959 he was acquired by Valencia CF but because it had reached its maximum allowance of foreign players, Cardona was lent to Spanish club Elche, who a year later was promoted to the top flight of the Spanish League for the first time in their history. He made his debut on September 13, 1959 against Real Oviedo, and stayed for 5 seasons, playing 89 games and scoring 24 goals in the first division.

In the season 1959, Cardona was the top scorer in the Spanish second division with 22 goals (the same number of goals made by first division top scorer Alfredo Di Stéfano that season).

In 1964 he transferred to Atlético Madrid, who that season came second in the league championship and won the Copa del Generalísimo (now known as La Copa del Rey). Cardona scoring the winning goal in the final against Real Zaragoza. The following year he played 10 times in Atlético's championship-winning season.

Cardona, playing with Valencia C.F., scored the first goal in the first nightly game in the Estadio Azteca in Mexico City against Necaxa on June 5, 1966. The final score was 3-1 in favor of Valencia C.F.

== International career ==
Cardona played internationally with Honduras, but never qualified for a World Cup finals. He represented his country in 3 FIFA World Cup qualification matches.

== Later life ==
Cardona retired at the end of the 1968–69 season, by which time he had played a total of 141 games in the Primera División, scoring 44 goals. He died, aged 73, in San Pedro Sula, Honduras, of a heart attack.

== Honours and awards ==
=== Club ===
Elche

- Segunda Division: 1958-59

Atlético Madrid

- La Liga: 1965–66, 1969–70
- Copa del Generalísimo: 1964–65
