= Vavá II =

Spanish footballer

Personal information
- Full name: Luciano Sánchez García
- Date of birth: 28 May 1944 (age 82)
- Place of birth: Béjar, Spain
- Height: 1.69 m (5 ft 7 in)
- Position: Forward

Youth career
- Béjar Industrial

Senior career*
Years	Team	Apps	(Gls)
1963–1964	Deportivo Ilicitano		
1964–1973	Elche	214	(64)
1973–1974	Deportivo de La Coruña	7	(0)
1974–1976	Melilla		
1976–1977	Mérida Industrial		
1977–1979	Don Benito		
Total		221	(64)

International career
1966–1969	Spain	2	(0)
- * Club domestic league appearances and goals

Luciano Sánchez García (28 May 1944), known as Vavá II, is a retired Spanish footballer who played as a forward.

== Club career ==
As a youngster, Luciano gave himself the nickname Vavá II, due to his admiration for the Brazilian striker, he began his career with his hometown team, CD Béjar Industrial. In 1963 he signed for Elche CF, although the first season he played for the reserve team, Deportivo Ilicitano, in Segunda División.

He made his debut on Primera División on 18 October 1964, in a match against UD Las Palmas in which he scored a goal. In 1965, he played a friendly match for FC Barcelona. The following year, the 1965/66 season, he was the top scorer in the Spanish League, with nineteen goals, making him the only player in the history of Elche CF to have won the Pichichi Trophy. A few months later, he also became the first Elche player to wear the Spain national team shirt. In 1969 he was runner-up in the Copa del Rey, the greatest sporting success in the history of Elche CF. In the final, Athletic Bilbao won 1-0 and Vavá played the entire match.

Despite losing the category in the 1970/71 season, he continued to play for Elche in Segunda División. For the 1973/74 season he signed for Deportivo de La Coruña, where he played for one season. In 1974 he retired from professional football, and he played for Melilla CF, Mérida Industrial and Don Benito for the following seasons until 1979, when he ultimately retired.

== International career ==
In the Spain national team, he played two matches without scoring a goal. He made his debut on 23 October 1966 in a match against the Republic of Ireland.

== Career statistics ==
=== Clubs ===
Appearances and goals by club, season and competition
Club	Season	League			Cup		Total	
Club	Season	Division	Apps	Goals	Apps	Goals	Apps	Goals
Elche	1964–65	La Liga	19	10	2	1	21	11
Elche	1965–66	La Liga	30	18	6	5	36	23
Elche	1966–67	La Liga	29	8	6	2	35	10
Elche	1967–68	La Liga	25	9	5	3	30	12
Elche	1968–69	La Liga	30	8	8	0	38	8
Elche	1969–70	La Liga	27	2	2	1	29	3
Elche	1970–71	La Liga	24	7	3	0	27	7
Elche	1971–72	Segunda División	30	2	2	1	32	3
Elche	Total		214	64	34	13	248	77
Deportivo de La Coruña	1973–74	Segunda División	7	0	?	?	7	0
Don Benito	1977–78	Tercera División	?	?	1	0	1	0
Don Benito	1978–79	Tercera División	?	?	2	0	2	0
Don Benito	Total		?	?	3	0	3	0
Career total			221	64	37	13	258	77

=== International ===
National team	Year	Apps	Goals
Spain	1966	1	0
Spain	1969	1	0
Total		2	0

== Honours ==
=== Individual ===
- La Liga: Top Scorer 1965–66
