= 1960–61 Scottish Division One =

55th season of top-tier football league in Scotland

Scottish Division One
- Season: 1960–61
- Champions: Rangers
- Relegated: Clyde; Ayr United

The 1960–61 Scottish Division One was won by Rangers, who finished one point ahead of nearest rival Kilmarnock. Clyde and Ayr United finished 17th and 18th respectively and were relegated to the 1961-62 Second Division.

== League table ==
Pos	Team	Pld	W	D	L	GF	GA	GR	Pts	Qualification or relegation
1	Rangers (C)	34	23	5	6	88	46	1.913	51	Qualified for the European Cup
2	Kilmarnock	34	21	8	5	77	45	1.711	50	
3	Third Lanark	34	20	2	12	100	80	1.250	42	
4	Celtic	34	15	9	10	64	46	1.391	39	
5	Motherwell	34	15	8	11	70	57	1.228	38	
6	Aberdeen	34	14	8	12	72	72	1.000	36	
7	Hearts	34	13	8	13	51	53	0.962	34	Invited for the Inter-Cities Fairs Cup
8	Hibernian	34	15	4	15	66	69	0.957	34	Invited for the Inter-Cities Fairs Cup
9	Dundee United	34	13	7	14	60	58	1.034	33	
10	Dundee	34	13	6	15	61	53	1.151	32	
11	Partick Thistle	34	13	6	15	59	69	0.855	32	
12	Dunfermline Athletic	34	12	7	15	65	81	0.802	31	Qualified for the Cup Winners' Cup
13	Airdrieonians	34	10	10	14	61	71	0.859	30	
14	St Mirren	34	11	7	16	53	58	0.914	29	
15	St Johnstone	34	10	9	15	47	63	0.746	29	
16	Raith Rovers	34	10	7	17	46	67	0.687	27	
17	Clyde (R)	34	6	11	17	55	77	0.714	23	Relegated to the Second Division
18	Ayr United (R)	34	5	12	17	51	81	0.630	22	Relegated to the Second Division

Source: RSSSF
(C) Champions; (R) Relegated

== Results ==
Home \ Away	ABE	AIR	AYR	CEL	CLY	DND	DNU	DNF	HOM	HIB	KIL	MOT	PAR	RAI	RAN	STJ	STM	THI
Aberdeen		1–1	3–1	1–3	4–2	2–1	1–3	1–4	0–2	1–4	3–2	3–3	2–1	0–1	6–1	4–2	1–0	5–3
Airdrieonians	3–1		4–2	2–0	0–2	2–4	4–4	0–1	2–2	4–3	1–1	4–2	2–3	1–0	1–1	3–0	2–1	4–1
Ayr United	1–1	2–2		1–3	2–2	2–4	3–0	4–1	1–0	0–1	2–2	0–0	2–0	1–1	1–0	0–1	0–5	2–3
Celtic	0–0	4–0	2–0		6–1	2–1	1–1	2–1	1–3	2–0	3–2	1–0	0–1	1–1	1–5	1–1	4–2	2–3
Clyde	1–1	3–1	2–2	0–3		0–0	3–1	6–0	1–1	3–3	1–3	1–0	3–3	0–2	1–3	0–0	4–2	2–4
Dundee	3–3	2–1	6–1	0–1	4–1		3–0	4–1	2–2	0–1	1–0	2–2	1–2	2–3	4–2	2–1	2–0	2–2
Dundee United	3–3	1–2	2–1	1–1	2–1	3–1		5–0	3–0	3–1	2–4	0–1	3–0	4–1	1–1	0–2	2–0	1–2
Dunfermline Athletic	2–6	6–4	2–2	2–2	2–2	4–2	3–2		2–1	4–2	2–4	1–6	2–1	3–2	0–0	5–1	1–2	2–3
Heart of Midlothian	3–4	3–1	2–1	2–1	4–2	2–1	1–1	1–1		1–2	0–1	1–5	0–1	1–0	1–3	3–1	0–0	1–0
Hibernian	2–2	3–3	3–1	0–6	4–0	1–0	2–0	2–1	1–4		4–0	2–1	1–1	0–1	1–2	3–1	4–3	8–4
Kilmarnock	4–1	1–0	5–1	2–2	1–0	2–1	1–1	1–1	2–1	3–2		5–3	4–1	6–0	2–0	2–2	1–2	3–1
Motherwell	1–0	2–0	2–2	2–2	2–1	2–0	4–3	2–4	1–1	4–1	1–3		2–0	2–1	1–2	2–0	0–3	4–5
Partick Thistle	3–4	2–2	3–3	1–2	3–1	2–2	1–0	1–0	4–1	3–1	2–3	1–3		2–2	0–3	3–0	3–2	2–1
Raith Rovers	0–3	2–0	3–1	2–2	1–0	2–1	0–2	1–1	1–1	0–2	1–1	1–3	1–3		2–3	1–3	5–2	3–6
Rangers	4–0	3–0	7–3	2–1	2–1	0–1	4–0	3–1	3–0	1–0	2–3	2–2	6–3	3–0		1–0	5–1	4–3
St Johnstone	2–1	2–2	4–1	2–1	2–2	1–1	0–2	2–1	2–3	2–0	1–1	2–1	2–1	0–2	2–5		1–1	3–4
St Mirren	1–3	1–1	2–2	2–1	2–2	1–2	0–3	0–2	2–0	2–1	0–1	2–3	5–0	3–0	1–1	0–0		1–0
Third Lanark	5–1	5–2	3–3	2–0	7–4	2–1	6–1	4–2	0–3	6–1	0–1	1–1	3–2	4–3	2–4	4–2	1–2	

Legend: Blue = home team win; Yellow = draw; Red = away team win.
