= Ron Mailer =

Scottish footballer

Personal information
- Full name: Ronald George Mailer
- Date of birth: 18 May 1932
- Place of birth: Auchterarder, Scotland
- Date of death: 29 March 2018 (aged 85)
- Position: Wing half

Youth career
- Auchterarder Primrose

Senior career*
Years	Team	Apps	(Gls)
1951–1954	Dunfermline Athletic	42	(6)
1954–1955	Darlington	11	(2)
1955–1964	Dunfermline Athletic	196	(20)
Total		249	(28)
- * Club domestic league appearances and goals

Ronald George Mailer (18 May 1932 – 29 March 2018) was a Scottish footballer, who played for Dunfermline Athletic and Darlington. Mailer was captain of the Dunfermline team that won the 1961 Scottish Cup Final, after a replay, against Celtic. He died on 28 March 2018, aged 85.
