= José Ufarte =

Spanish footballer and manager

Personal information
- Full name: José Armando Ufarte Ventoso
- Date of birth: 17 May 1941 (age 85)
- Place of birth: Pontevedra, Spain
- Height: 1.71 m (5 ft 7 1/2 in)
- Position: Winger

Youth career
- Pontevedra
- 1955–1960: Flamengo

Senior career*
Years	Team	Apps	(Gls)
1961	Flamengo	0	(0)
1961–1962	Corinthians	19	(5)
1962–1964	Flamengo	35	(6)
1964–1974	Atlético Madrid	247	(25)
1974–1976	Racing Santander	55	(10)
Total		356	(46)

International career
1964	Spain B	1	(0)
1965–1972	Spain	16	(2)

Managerial career
- Atlético Madrid (youth)
- 1985–1986: Atlético Madrileño
- 1988: Atlético Madrid
- 1988–1990: Racing Santander
- 1992–1993: Mérida
- 1997–2004: Spain youth
- 2002–2004: Spain U21
- 2004–2008: Spain (assistant)
- * Club domestic league appearances and goals

José Armando Ufarte Ventoso (born 17 May 1941) is a Spanish former professional footballer and manager.

A right winger, he amassed La Liga totals of 274 matches and 32 goals over 11 seasons, almost exclusively for Atlético Madrid. He later embarked on a managerial career, which included coaching both his main club and the Spain national team in various levels and capacities.

Ufarte represented Spain at the 1966 World Cup.

== Club career ==
Born in Pontevedra, Galicia, Ufarte moved with his family to Brazil at a young age, playing in the country with CR Flamengo (two stints) and SC Corinthians Paulista and earning the nickname O Espanhol (The Spaniard in Portuguese) during his spell. He returned to his homeland in 1964, signing for Atlético Madrid and making his La Liga debut on 13 September in a 3–1 home win against Real Betis, helping the team to an eventual runner-up position.

In the 1969–70 season, Ufarte played all 30 league games and scored three goals as the Colchoneros won the national championship, the second of the three the player would win with the team. In summer 1974, having appeared in 323 competitive matches – 36 goals– the 33-year-old joined Racing de Santander of Segunda División, achieving top-flight promotion in his first year and retiring after the following campaign.

Ufarte started coaching with Atlético's youth sides, then ascended to the reserves in the second division. Late into 1987–88, he replaced the fired César Luis Menotti at the helm of the main squad, being in charge for three matches and dismissed himself after feuding with elusive club chairman Jesús Gil.

Ufarte joined his other former club Racing for the 1988–89 season, in the second tier, being relieved of his duties after the 23rd round of the following campaign, with the Cantabrians eventually ranking 17th and being relegated. His last appointment would be with CP Mérida also in division two, in 1992–93.

== International career ==
Ufarte made his debut for Spain on 5 May 1965, a 1–0 loss in Dublin against the Republic of Ireland for the 1966 FIFA World Cup 1966 FIFA World Cup qualifiers. Selected for the finals in England, he appeared against Argentina in a 2–1 group stage defeat.

In the 1990s and 2000s, Ufarte coached several youth teams of the national side, being in charge of the under-20s as they finished second at the 2003 FIFA World Youth Championship in the United Arab Emirates.

=== International goals ===
#	Date	Venue	Opponent	Score	Result	Competition
1.	10 November 1965	Parc des Princes, Paris, France	Republic of Ireland	1–0	1–0	1966 World Cup qualification
2.	17 October 1968	Gerland, Lyon, France	France	0–2	1–3	Friendly

== Honours ==
=== Player ===
Flamengo

- Torneio Rio–São Paulo: 1961
- Campeonato Carioca: 1963

Atlético Madrid

- La Liga: 1965–66, 1969–70, 1972–73
- Copa del Generalísimo: 1964–65, 1971–72

=== Manager ===
Spain U19

- UEFA European Under-19 Championship: 2004

Spain U20

- FIFA U-20 World Cup runner-up: 2003
