= 1960–61 Scottish Cup =

Tournament details
- Country: Scotland

Final positions
- Champions: Dunfermline Athletic
- Runners-up: Celtic

The 1960–61 Scottish Cup was the 76th staging of Scotland's most prestigious football knockout competition. The Cup was won by Dunfermline Athletic who defeated Celtic in the replayed final.

== First round ==
Home team	Score	Away team
Alloa Athletic	5 – 4	East Stirlingshire
Berwick Rangers	1 – 4	Dunfermline Athletic
Clyde	0 – 2	Hibernian
Deveronvale	1 – 0	Stirling Albion
Elgin City	2 – 2	Airdrieonians
Falkirk	1 – 3	Celtic
Hearts	9 – 0	Tarff Rovers
Keith	1 – 2	East Fife
Montrose	3 – 1	Albion Rovers
Peebles Rovers	4 – 2	Gala Fairydean
Queen of the South	1 – 1	St Johnstone
Queen's Park	2 – 3	Arbroath
Third Lanark	2 – 0	Stenhousemuir

=== Replays ===
Home team	Score	Away team
Airdrieonians	2 – 0	Elgin City
St Johnstone	1 – 2	Queen of the South

== Second round ==
Home team	Score	Away team
Aberdeen	4 – 2	Deveronvale
Alloa Athletic	2 – 0	Dumbarton
Ayr United	0 – 0	Airdrieonians
Brechin City	5 – 3	Duns
Buckie Thistle	0 – 2	Raith Rovers
Celtic	6 – 0	Montrose
Cowdenbeath	1 – 4	Motherwell
Dundee	1 – 5	Rangers
Dundee United	0 – 1	St Mirren
East Fife	1 – 3	Partick Thistle
Forfar Athletic	2 – 0	Greenock Morton
Hibernian	15 – 1	Peebles Rovers
Kilmarnock	1 – 2	Hearts
Queen of the South	0 – 2	Hamilton Academical
Stranraer	1 – 3	Dunfermline Athletic
Third Lanark	5 – 2	Arbroath

=== Replays ===
Home team	Score	Away team
Airdrieonians	3 – 1	Ayr United

== Third round ==
Home team	Score	Away team
Aberdeen	3 – 6	Dunfermline Athletic
Alloa Athletic	2 – 1	Forfar Athletic
Brechin City	0 – 3	Airdrieonians
Hamilton Academical	0 – 4	Hibernian
Motherwell	2 – 2	Rangers
Partick Thistle	1 – 2	Hearts
Raith Rovers	1 – 4	Celtic
St Mirren	3 – 3	Third Lanark

=== Replays ===
Home team	Score	Away team
Rangers	2 – 5	Motherwell
Third Lanark	0 – 8	St Mirren

== Quarter-finals ==
Home team	Score	Away team
Celtic	1 – 1	Hibernian
Dunfermline Athletic	4 – 0	Alloa Athletic
Hearts	0 – 1	St Mirren
Motherwell	0 – 1	Airdrieonians

=== Replays ===
Home team	Score	Away team
Hibernian	0 – 1	Celtic

== Semi-finals ==
1 April 1961

Celtic	4–0	Airdrieonians

Hampden Park, Glasgow
Attendance: 72,612

1 April 1961

Dunfermline Athletic	0–0	St Mirren

Tynecastle Stadium, Edinburgh
Attendance: 31,930

=== Replay ===
5 April 1961

Dunfermline Athletic	1–0	St Mirren

Tynecastle Stadium, Edinburgh
Attendance: 16,741

== Final ==
22 April 1961

Dunfermline Athletic	0–0	Celtic

Hampden Park, Glasgow
Attendance: 113,618
Referee: Hugh Philips

Teams

DUNFERMLINE ATHLETIC:
GK	(Scotland) Eddie Connachan
RB	(Scotland) Cammie Fraser
LB	(Northern Ireland) Willie Cunningham
RH	(Scotland) Ron Mailer (c)
CH	(Scotland) Jackie Williamson
LH	(Scotland) George Miller
RW	(Scotland) George Peebles
IR	(Scotland) Alex Smith
CF	(Scotland) Charlie Dickson
IL	(Scotland) Dan McLindon
LW	(Scotland) Harry Melrose
Manager:
(Scotland) Jock Stein

CELTIC:
GK	(Scotland) Frank Haffey
RB	(Scotland) Duncan MacKay (c)
LB	(Scotland) Jim Kennedy
RH	(Scotland) Paddy Crerand
CH	(Scotland) Billy McNeill
LH	(Scotland) John Clark
RW	(Republic of Ireland) Charlie Gallagher
IR	(Scotland) Willie Fernie
CF	(Scotland) John Hughes
IL	(Scotland) Stevie Chalmers
LW	(Scotland) Alex Byrne
Manager:
(Scotland) Jimmy McGrory

=== Replay ===
26 April 1961

Dunfermline Athletic	2–0	Celtic
Dave Thomson; Charlie Dickson

Hampden Park, Glasgow
Attendance: 87,866
Referee: Hugh Philips

Teams

DUNFERMLINE ATHLETIC:
GK	(Scotland) Eddie Connachan
RB	(Scotland) Cammie Fraser
LB	(Northern Ireland) Willie Cunningham
RH	(Scotland) Ron Mailer (c)
CH	(Scotland) George Miller
LH	(Scotland) John Sweeney
RW	(Scotland) George Peebles
IR	(Scotland) Alex Smith
CF	(Scotland) Dave Thomson
IL	(Scotland) Charlie Dickson
LW	(Scotland) Harry Melrose
Manager:
(Scotland) Jock Stein

CELTIC:
GK	(Scotland) Frank Haffey
RB	(Scotland) Duncan MacKay (c)
LB	(Scotland) Willie O'Neill
RH	(Scotland) Paddy Crerand
CH	(Scotland) Billy McNeill
LH	(Scotland) John Clark
RW	(Republic of Ireland) Charlie Gallagher
IR	(Scotland) Willie Fernie
CF	(Scotland) John Hughes
IL	(Scotland) Stevie Chalmers
LW	(Scotland) Alex Byrne
Manager:
(Scotland) Jimmy McGrory

== See also ==
- 1960–61 in Scottish football
- 1960–61 Scottish League Cup
