= Thorvald Larsen =

Norwegian footballer and bandy player (1934–2022)

Thorvald Larsen (19 May 1934 – 10 September 2022) was a Norwegian footballer and bandy player.

Larsen grew up in Sagene. He played football on the highest level in Norway; four seasons in Vålerengen. Here he won the Norwegian First Division 1965, and also played and scored in the 1966–67 European Cup. Larsen was also capped for the Norway national bandy team.

Larsen married and had three children. In 1970, he moved to Asker, working as a machine engineer. He chaired the local sports club Asker SK for two years. Larsen died on 10 September 2022, at the age of 88.
