= Jorge Mendonça (footballer, born 1938) =

Angolan footballer

Personal information
- Full name: Jorge Alberto Mendonça Paulino
- Date of birth: 19 September 1938 (age 88)
- Place of birth: Luanda, Portuguese Angola
- Height: 1.84 m (6 ft 0 in)
- Position: Striker

Youth career
- 1955–1956: Sporting CP

Senior career*
Years	Team	Apps	(Gls)
1956–1958	Braga	24	(15)
1958	Deportivo La Coruña	5	(1)
1958–1967	Atlético Madrid	221	(83)
1967–1969	Barcelona	76	(25)
1969–1970	Mallorca	5	(1)
Total		331	(125)
- * Club domestic league appearances and goals

Jorge Alberto Mendonça Paulino (born 19 September 1938), known as Mendonça, is a Portuguese-Angolan former footballer who played as a striker.

Having spent the vast majority of his career in Spain, he amassed La Liga totals of 205 matches and 69 goals over the course of 12 seasons, almost all with Atlético Madrid, with which he won five major titles.

== Club career ==
Born in Luanda, Portuguese Angola, Mendonça started his career with Braga. In early 1958, the 19-year-old moved to Spain where he would remain for the rest of his playing days, representing Deportivo La Coruña for a couple of months then signing for Atlético Madrid. He made his debut for the latter club on 14 September in a 2–0 home win against Real Oviedo, scoring the last goal; three days later he was one four players netting braces in an 8–0 trouncing of Drumcondra for the season's European Cup.

During his nine-year spell at the Vicente Calderón Stadium, Mendonça would never appear in more than 25 La Liga matches, but was a solid attacking contributor as the Colchoneros won three Copa del Rey trophies and the 1962 UEFA Cup Winners' Cup, with the player scoring in the final's replay, a 3–0 victory over Fiorentina. He left with competitive totals of 235 games and 91 goals, retiring in June 1970 after unassuming top-flight spells with Barcelona (two seasons) and Mallorca (one, team relegation).

== Personal life ==
Mendonça converted to Jehovah's Witnesses in the late 1960s. Barcelona president Narcís de Carreras found this intolerable and ordered manager Salvador Artigas not to field him. As a result, Mendonça was transferred to Mallorca.

== Honours ==
Atlético Madrid

- La Liga: 1965–66
- Copa del Generalísimo: 1959–60, 1960–61, 1964–65
- UEFA Cup Winners' Cup: 1961–62

Barcelona

- Copa del Generalísimo: 1967–68
