= Dave Thomson (footballer, born 1938) =

Scottish footballer

Davie Thomson
Personal information
- Full name: David Laing Thomson
- Date of birth: 2 February 1938
- Place of birth: Falkirk, Scotland
- Date of death: 28 January 2016 (aged 77)
- Place of death: Falkirk, Scotland
- Position: Forward

Youth career
- Bo'ness United

Senior career*
Years	Team	Apps	(Gls)
1959–1961	Dunfermline Athletic	8	(4)
1961–1963	Leicester City	1	(1)
1963–1964	Queen of the South	10	(3)
1964–1967	Linlithgow Rose		
1967	→ East Stirlingshire (trialist)	2	(0)
1967–1968	Berwick Rangers	6	(4)
- Linlithgow Rose
Total		27	(12)
- * Club domestic league appearances and goals

Dave Thomson (2 February 1938 – 28 January 2016) was a Scottish professional footballer.

Thomson was part of the Dunfermline Athletic team that won the 1960–61 Scottish Cup, scoring the opening goal with a header in the 67th minute.

Thomson died on 28 January 2016 at the age of 77.
