= Eddie Connachan =

Scottish footballer (1935–2021)

Personal information
- Full name: Edward Devlin Connachan
- Date of birth: 27 August 1935
- Place of birth: Prestonpans, Scotland
- Date of death: 29 January 2021 (aged 85)
- Height: 5 ft 9 in (1.75 m)
- Position: Goalkeeper

Youth career
- Dalkeith Thistle

Senior career*
| Years | Team | Apps | (Gls) |
| 1957–1963 | Dunfermline Athletic | 126 | (0) |
| 1963–1966 | Middlesbrough | 95 | (0) |
| 1966–1968 | Falkirk | 27 | (0) |
| 1968 | Port Elizabeth City | | |
| 1969–1972 | East London Celtic / -United | | |

International career
| 1961–1962 | Scotland | 2 | (0) |
| 1961–1962 | Scottish League XI | 4 | (0) |
| 1962 | SFL trial v SFA | 1 | (0) |
- * Club domestic league appearances and goals

Edward Devlin Connachan (27 August 1935 – 28 January 2021) was a Scottish footballer, who played as a goalkeeper for Dunfermline Athletic, Middlesbrough, Falkirk, East London Celtic and the Scotland national team.

Connachan joined Dunfermline from Dalkeith Thistle in May 1957 and went on to play 172 games for Dunfermline. He helped the club win the Scottish Cup for the first time in 1961 in what was to become known as "Connachan's Cup Final" as he made save after save from the Celtic forwards and he earned two caps for Scotland, against Czechoslovakia in November 1961 and Hungary in May 1962. He also earned selection in the Scottish League representative side.

Connachan joined Middlesbrough in August 1963 for £5,500, returning to Scotland with Falkirk in November 1966. His final port of call was South Africa, where he played for East London Celtic before retiring. He still resided in the African state.

In March 2007 Connachan was inducted into Dunfermline Athletic's Hall of Fame.

Connachan died in January 2021, aged 85.
