= 1965–66 Irish League =

Irish League
- Season: 1965–66
- Champions: Linfield; 27th Irish title
- Matches played: 132
- Goals scored: 553 (4.19 per match)
- Top goalscorer: Sammy Pavis (28 goals)

Location of teams in the Irish League from 1949–1972
Location of Belfast-based teams in the Irish League from 1949–1971

The 1965–66 Irish League was the 65th edition of the Irish League, the highest level of league competition in Northern Irish football. The league consisted of 12 teams, and Linfield won the championship.

== League standings ==
Pos	Team	Pld	W	D	L	GF	GA	GR	Pts	Qualification
1	Linfield (C)	22	14	6	2	68	23	2.957	34	Qualification for the European Cup first round
2	Derry City	22	15	2	5	61	33	1.848	32	
3	Glentoran	22	15	2	5	50	29	1.724	32	European Cup Winners' Cup and Inter-Cities Fairs Cup
4	Ballymena United	22	11	6	5	51	33	1.545	28	
5	Glenavon	22	11	3	8	62	38	1.632	25	
6	Coleraine	22	10	5	7	52	36	1.444	25	
7	Crusaders	22	9	3	10	49	47	1.043	21	
8	Portadown	22	7	3	12	43	53	0.811	17	
9	Distillery	22	5	6	11	39	52	0.750	16	
10	Ards	22	4	6	12	29	54	0.537	14	
11	Bangor	22	5	4	13	26	59	0.441	14	
12	Cliftonville	22	1	4	17	23	96	0.240	6	

Source: rsssf.com
(C) Champions

== Results ==
Home \ Away	ARD	BAN	BLM	CLI	COL	CRU	DIS	DER	GLV	GLT	LIN	POR
Ards		1–2	1–2	1–1	0–0	2–2	1–0	0–3	1–3	2–3	1–3	1–4
Bangor	2–2		0–0	3–1	0–3	1–1	1–3	1–0	2–5	0–4	1–4	4–1
Ballymena United	2–2	2–0		8–0	1–2	5–2	3–0	3–4	5–5	2–1	0–0	1–0
Cliftonville	2–1	1–3	1–5		3–3	0–4	0–3	1–1	1–6	3–5	0–10	0–6
Coleraine	5–1	6–0	1–3	6–2		2–2	3–0	3–1	2–0	0–1	0–0	1–1
Crusaders	6–1	4–1	1–3	7–1	4–2		1–0	1–2	2–1	0–1	2–3	5–0
Distillery	2–2	3–1	1–1	2–2	3–1	1–2		2–5	2–4	0–4	3–3	3–3
Derry City	4–1	4–2	5–1	4–1	3–2	5–0	3–1		1–3	3–2	0–0	5–0
Glenavon	1–2	3–1	0–1	6–1	2–4	4–1	2–1	1–2		8–2	0–1	4–1
Glentoran	2–3	3–1	0–0	2–0	2–0	2–1	7–3	0–1	0–0		2–0	2–0
Linfield	5–1	8–0	5–2	3–0	4–1	6–1	3–3	3–2	1–1	1–2		3–0
Portadown	0–2	0–0	2–1	7–2	3–5	4–0	0–3	5–3	4–3	1–3	1–2	

Source: Irish League Archive
Legend: Blue = home team win; Yellow = draw; Red = away team win.
