= Ivan Mráz =

Czechoslovak footballer (1941–2024)

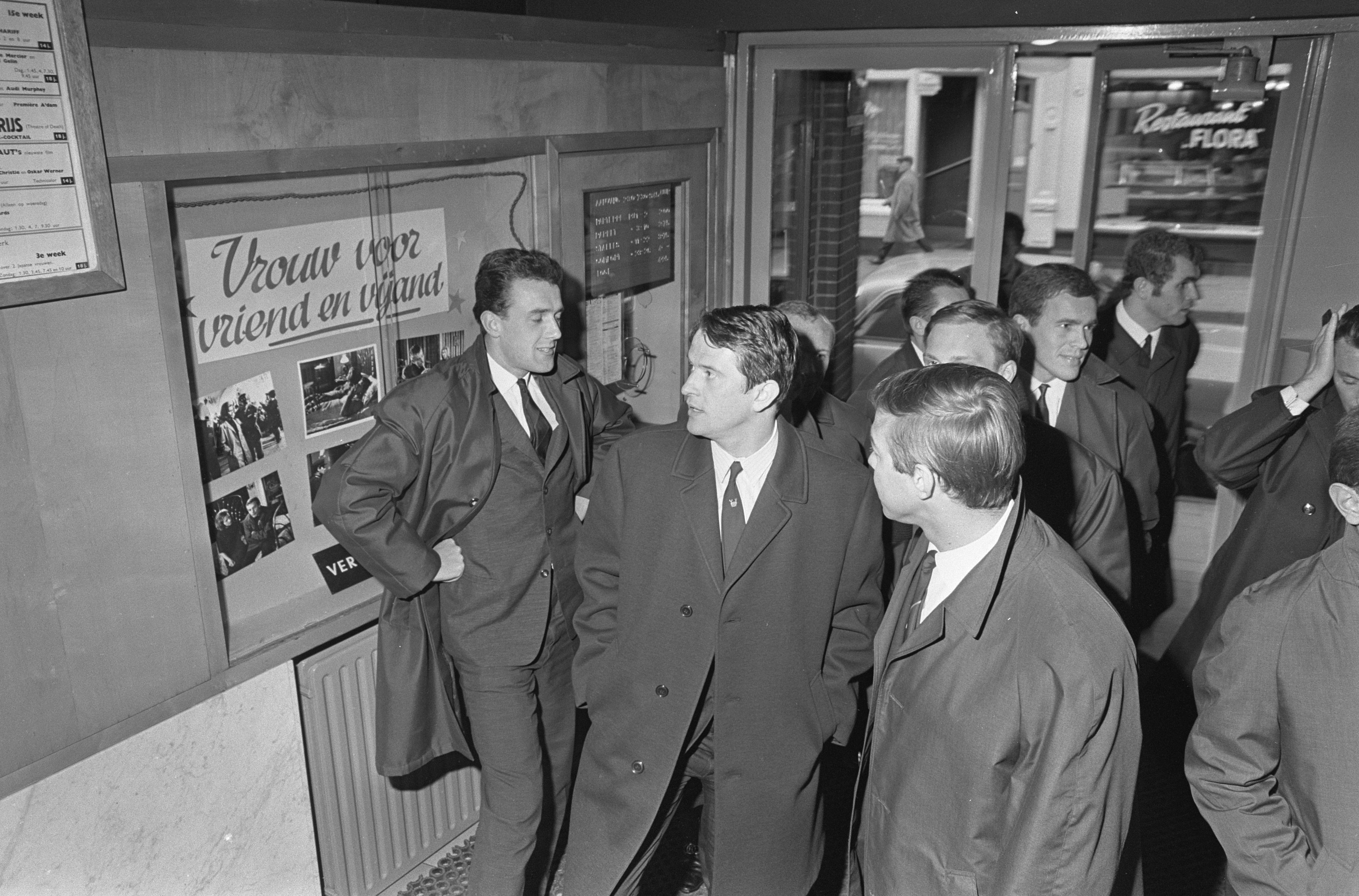

Personal information
- Date of birth: 24 May 1941
- Place of birth: Levoča, Slovak Republic
- Date of death: 18 May 2024 (aged 82)
- Place of death: Heredia, Costa Rica
- Height: 1.82 m (6 ft 0 in)
- Position: Forward

Senior career*
Years	Team	Apps	(Gls)
1959–1963	Slovan Bratislava	42	(7)
1963–1965	Spartak Praha Sokolovo	61	(28)
1966	Dukla Prague	4	(1)
1967–1968	Sparta ČKD Praha	41	(18)
1969–1970	Maastricht		
1971	Dukla Prague	5	(1)

International career
1964–1965	Czechoslovakia	4	(5)

Managerial career
- 1974–1975: Sparta Prague
- 1979–1981: Alajuelense
- 1980: Costa Rica
- 1991–1994: Alajuelense
- 2010–?: UCR
Medal record
Men's football
Representing Czechoslovakia
Olympic Games
Silver medal – second place	1964 Tokyo	Team competition
- * Club domestic league appearances and goals

Ivan Mráz (24 May 1941 – 18 May 2024) was a Czechoslovak football player and manager. A forward, he competed in the 1964 Summer Olympics and won the silver medal. Scored five goals in that Olympics Football Tournament. Besides Czechoslovakia, he played in the Netherlands. Mráz later suffered from Alzheimer's disease. He died at Saint Paul's Hospital in Heredia, Costa Rica, on 18 May 2024, at the age of 82, six days before his 83rd birthday.

== Coach career ==
Remembered as Liga Deportiva Alajuelense's manager and team coach where he won two Costa Rican national titles in 1980 and 1991. In 1980 was the coach of National Team of Costa Rica.

In December 2010, Mráz was appointed a coach of CF Universidad de Costa Rica.
