= Arthur Thomas (footballer) =

Irish footballer

Arthur Thomas (1938 – 8 November 2007) was born in Liverpool and signed for Linfield F.C. from Ballymena United F.C. in November 1965. He made his Linfield debut in a 2–0 defeat by Glentoran on 6 November 1965. In that 1965–66 season he won a Co. Antrim Shield winners medal against Ballymena United and it was a season in which he scored 16 goals in his 31 Linfield appearances.

He was one of the stars of the Linfield team in the 1966–67 season when the club reached the Quarter Final of the European Cup, before losing narrowly on aggregate to CSKA Sofia of Bulgaria. Arthur scored three goals in the European tie against Aris of Luxembourg that season and his final tally of five European goals is still a club record held jointly with Phil Scott and Glenn Ferguson.

A former schoolteacher at St. James Secondary Modern Liverpool in Merseyside, Arthur joined New Brighton on the Wirral from Linfield in September 1967 and around 45 years ago he emigrated to Sydney, Australia.

Arthur died in Sydney on 8 November 2007.
