= Stanislav Štrunc =

Czech footballer

Personal information
- Date of birth: 30 October 1942
- Place of birth: Škvrňany (currently part of Plzeň), Protectorate of Bohemia and Moravia
- Date of death: 8 November 2001 (aged 59)
- Place of death: Plzeň, Czech Republic
- Position: Striker

Youth career
- –1955: Spartak Skvrňany
- 1955–1957: Škoda Plzeň
- 1957–1959: Škoda Plzeň-Karlov

Senior career*
Years	Team	Apps	(Gls)
1959–1965	Škoda Plzeň		
1965–1972	Dukla Prague	164	(65)
1972–1977	Škoda Plzeň	121	(23)
1977–1979	Lachema Kaznějov		
1979	Potraviny Plzeň		

International career
1966–1970	Czechoslovakia	3	(0)
- * Club domestic league appearances and goals

Stanislav Štrunc (30 October 1942 – 8 November 2001) was a Czech football player. His playing position was right winger.

Štrunc started his football career in his native Plzeň, where his football club Škoda Plzeň (today Viktoria Plzeň) elevated him to the role of a prolific goalscorer of the Czechoslovak First League. In 1965 he moved to Dukla Prague, to serve his military service, and played there until 1972. He scored 65 league goals for Dukla in that era. Štrunc won the First League with Dukla in 1966. In 1966 and 1969 he also won the Czechoslovak Cup with Dukla. Afterwards Štrunc returned to Plzeň and played professionally until 1977. He retired from top football one week after scoring his 100th league goal in 329 matches.

Internationally Štrunc played for Czechoslovakia and represented his country at the 1968 Summer Olympics in Mexico. He made three appearances for the national team, all of which were during his time as a Dukla Prague player.

Štrunc is perceived as a legendary player at Viktoria Plzeň. Since 2004 the youth international football tournament named after him is held by Viktoria.
