= Osvaldo da Silva =

Brazilian footballer

Osvaldo Silva
Personal information
- Full name: Osvaldo da Silva
- Date of birth: 13 March 1934
- Place of birth: Belo Horizonte, Brazil
- Date of death: 15 August 2002 (aged 68)
- Place of death: Lisbon, Portugal
- Position: Midfielder

Senior career*
Years	Team	Apps	(Gls)
1953–1956	América Mineiro		
1957–1959	Porto	35	(15)
1959–1962	Leixões	71	(31)
1962–1966	Sporting	74	(27)
1966–1967	Portuguesa		
1968–1969	Académico Viseu	24	(7)
1969–1971	Olhanense		
1971–1972	Avintes		
- * Club domestic league appearances and goals

Osvaldo da Silva (13 March 1934 – 15 August 2002) was a Brazilian footballer.

== Career statistics ==
=== Club ===
Club	Season	League			Cup		Other		Total	
Club	Season	Division	Apps	Goals	Apps	Goals	Apps	Goals	Apps	Goals
Porto	1957–58	Primeira Divisão	24	11	6 (Note: Appearances in the Taça de Portugal)	7	0	0	30	18
Porto	1958–59	Primeira Divisão	11	4	0	0	0	0	11	4
Porto	Total		35	15	6	7	0	0	41	22
Leixões	1959–60	Primeira Divisão	24	9	0	0	0	0	24	9
Leixões	1960–61	Primeira Divisão	22	6	2	0	0	0	24	6
Leixões	1961–62	Primeira Divisão	25	16	0	0	6 (Note: Appearances in the European Cup Winners' Cup)	5	31	21
Leixões	Total		71	31	2	0	6	5	79	36
Sporting	1962–63	Primeira Divisão	26	16	11	5	4 (Note: Appearances in the European Cup)	0	41	21
Sporting	1963–64	Primeira Divisão	18	5	2	0	7	5	27	10
Sporting	1964–65	Primeira Divisão	23	5	10	3	2	0	35	8
Sporting	1965–66	Primeira Divisão	7	1	0	0	2 (Note: Appearances in the Fairs Cup)	0	9	1
Sporting	Total		74	27	23	8	15	5	112	40
Académico Viseu	1968–69	Segunda Divisão	24	7	1	0	0	0	25	7
Career total			204	80	32	15	21	10	257	105
