= Børge Enemark =

Danish footballer (1943-1996)

Personal information
- Date of birth: 17 August 1943
- Place of birth: Varde, Denmark
- Date of death: 17 January 1996 (aged 52)
- Position: Midfielder

International career
Years	Team	Apps	(Gls)
1965–1969	Denmark	11	(0)

Børge Enemark (17 August 1943 – 17 January 1996) was a Danish footballer. He played in eleven matches for the Denmark national football team from 1965 to 1969.
