= George Peebles =

Scottish footballer and manager

Personal information
- Date of birth: 22 January 1936
- Place of birth: Stirling, Scotland
- Date of death: 16 October 2016 (aged 80)
- Place of death: Stirling, Scotland
- Position: Winger

Youth career
- 1952–1955: Dunipace

Senior career*
Years	Team	Apps	(Gls)
1955–1966	Dunfermline Athletic	299	(57)
1966–1971	Stirling Albion	94	(17)
Total		393	(74)

Managerial career
- 1986–1988: Stirling Albion
- * Club domestic league appearances and goals

George Peebles (22 January 1936 – 16 October 2016) was a Scottish football player and manager. He played for Dunfermline Athletic for most of his career, helping the club win the 1960–61 Scottish Cup. Peebles provided an assist for the first Dunfermline goal in their cup final victory against Celtic. He moved to Stirling Albion in 1966 for a £4000 transfer fee.

Peebles later became a coach, managing Stirling Albion between 1986 and 1988. He had previously served as an assistant to Alex Smith, taking over when Smith moved to St Mirren. Peebles then coached players at St Johnstone on a part-time basis, while also working as a painter and decorator.
