= Béla Kuharszki =

Hungarian footballer

Personal information
- Date of birth: 29 April 1940
- Place of birth: Hungary
- Date of death: 7 March 2016 (aged 75)

Senior career*
Years	Team	Apps	(Gls)
1958–1968	Újpest Dózsa		
1969–1970	Egyetértés SK		
1971–1972	Vecsés		
Total		227	(75)

International career
1960–1962	Hungary	6	(0)
- * Club domestic league appearances and goals

Béla Kuharszki (29 April 1940 – 7 March 2016) was a Hungarian footballer. He played for the club Újpesti Dózsa as a striker. He played six games for the Hungary national football team.

Kuharszki played one qualifying game and was part of the squad for the 1962 FIFA World Cup.
