= Alex Byrne (footballer, born 1933) =

Scottish footballer (1933–2020)

Personal information
- Full name: Alexander Harrison Byrne
- Date of birth: 6 June 1933
- Place of birth: Greenock, Scotland
- Date of death: 31 October 2020 (aged 87)
- Place of death: Adelaide, South Australia
- Position: Left winger

Youth career
- Gourock
- Royal Engineers
- Cheltenham Town
- 1954–1956: Celtic

Senior career*
Years	Team	Apps	(Gls)
1956–1963	Celtic	70	(22)
1963	Greenock Morton	8	(6)
1963–1964	Queen of the South	9	(2)
1965	Hellas		
Total		87	(30)
- * Club domestic league appearances and goals

Alexander Harrison Byrne (6 June 1933 – 31 October 2020) was a Scottish professional footballer who played as a left winger.

== Career ==
Born in Greenock, Byrne played youth football in Scotland and England for Gourock, Royal Engineers and Cheltenham Town. He later played in the Scottish Football League for Celtic, Greenock Morton and Queen of the South, before playing in Australia for Hellas.

His death at the age of 87 was announced by former club Celtic on 9 November 2020.
