= 1960–61 Irish Cup =

Tournament details
- Country: Northern Ireland
- Teams: 16

Final positions
- Champions: Glenavon (3rd win)
- Runners-up: Linfield

Tournament statistics
- Matches played: 20
- Goals scored: 90 (4.5 per match)

The 1960–61 Irish Cup was the 81st edition of the Irish Cup, the premier knock-out cup competition in Northern Irish football.

Glenavon won the cup for the 3rd time, defeating the holders Linfield 5–1 in the final at Solitude.

== Results ==
=== First round ===
Team 1	Score	Team 2
Ards	2–2	Coleraine
Ballyclare Comrades	2–1	Chimney Corner
Ballymena United	2–1	Derry City
Glenavon	7–0	Banbridge Town
Glentoran	3–4	Distillery
Linfield	3–2	Cliftonville
Newington Rangers	2–3	Bangor
Portadown	2–2	Crusaders

==== Replay ====
Team 1	Score	Team 2
Coleraine	1–4	Ards
Crusaders	3–1	Portadown

=== Quarter-finals ===
Team 1	Score	Team 2
Ards	1–1	Glenavon
Ballymena United	1–3	Ballyclare Comrades
Distillery	1–1	Crusaders
Linfield	5–1	Bangor

==== Replay ====
Team 1	Score	Team 2
Crusaders	2–2	Distillery
Glenavon	4–1	Ards

==== Second replay ====
Team 1	Score	Team 2
Distillery	1–3	Crusaders

=== Semi-finals ===
Team 1	Score	Team 2
Glenavon	3–2	Crusaders
Linfield	4–2	Ballyclare Comrades

=== Final ===
22 April 1961

Glenavon	5–1	Linfield
Campbell 30', 67', 77'; Jones 31', 55'	Report	Ferguson 61'

Solitude, Belfast
Attendance: 18,000
Referee: H. Callaghan (Stockport)
