= Charlie Dickson =

Scottish footballer (1934–2013)

Personal information
- Date of birth: 7 July 1934
- Place of birth: Edinburgh, Scotland
- Date of death: 18 October 2013 (aged 79)
- Position: Centre-forward

Youth career
- Penicuik Athletic

Senior career*
Years	Team	Apps	(Gls)
1954–1964	Dunfermline Athletic	340	(215)
1964–1966	Queen of the South	35	(21)
- South West United (Australia)
Total		375	(236)
- * Club domestic league appearances and goals

Charles Dickson (7 July 1934 – 18 October 2013) was a Scottish footballer best known for playing for Dunfermline Athletic. He scored 215 goals in 340 appearances for the club which remains an all-time club record.

Dickson also played for Penicuik Athletic and Queen of the South.
