= 1964–65 Copa del Generalísimo =

63rd Copa del Rey

Tournament details
- Country: Spain
- Teams: 48

Final positions
- Champions: Club Atlético de Madrid (3rd title)
- Runners-up: Real Zaragoza

Tournament statistics
- Matches played: 99

The 1964–65 Copa del Generalísimo was the 63rd staging of the Spanish Cup. The competition began on 15 November 1964 and ended on 4 July 1965 with the final.

== First round ==
Team 1	Agg.	Team 2	1st leg	2nd leg
CD Abarán	3–9	Real Santander	3–3	0–6
CA Ceuta	3–6	Real Sociedad	3–2	0–4
Baracaldo CF	4–3	Cádiz CF	4–1	0–2
Burgos CF	10–4	Melilla CF	5–0	5–4
Calvo Sotelo CF	3–1	CD Europa	2–1	1–0
Celta Vigo	3–0	Hércules CF	2–0	1–0
Real Gijón	8–3	Real Valladolid	4–1	4–2
Granada CF	6–2	UP Langreo	6–1	0–1
CD Málaga	0–2	Pontevedra CF	0–1	0–1
RCD Mallorca	3–0	CD Sabadell CF	2–0	1–0
CD Mestalla	6–2	SD Indauchu	5–1	1–1
CD Orense	2–5	Onteniente CF	1–3	1–2
CA Osasuna	2–1	CD Constancia	2–1	0–0
Real Unión	4–1	Algeciras CF	4–0	0–1
Recreativo de Huelva	3–0	CD Hospitalet	3–0	0–0
CD Tenerife	2–2	CF Badalona	2–2	0–0

Source: RSSSF

- Tiebreaker

Team 1	Score	Team 2
CD Tenerife	2–2	CF Badalona

- Second tiebreaker

Team 1	Score	Team 2
CD Tenerife	4–0	CF Badalona

== Round of 32 ==
Team 1	Agg.	Team 2	1st leg	2nd leg
Baracaldo CF	5–6	Levante UD	3–1	2–5
Real Betis Balompié	1–4	Real Sociedad	1–2	0–2
Burgos CF	2–3	Córdoba CF	1–0	1–3
Real Gijón	3–3	RCD Español	3–1	0–2
Granada CF	1–2	Deportivo La Coruña	1–2	0–0
Recreativo de Huelva	1–3	Club Atlético de Bilbao	1–0	0–3
UD Las Palmas	2–2	CD Tenerife	2–0	0–2
RCD Mallorca	3–0	Sevilla CF	1–0	2–0
CD Mestalla	2–7	Real Madrid CF	2–1	0–6
Real Murcia	4–3	Calvo Sotelo CF	3–1	1–2
Onteniente CF	1–6	Club Atlético de Madrid	0–1	1–5
CA Osasuna	4–2	Real Oviedo	3–1	1–1
Pontevedra CF	2–1	Elche CF	0–0	2–1
Real Santander	1–8	CF Barcelona	1–4	0–4
Valencia CF	2–0	Celta Vigo	1–0	1–0
Real Zaragoza	9–1	Real Unión	5–1	4–0

Source: RSSSF

- Tiebreaker

Team 1	Score	Team 2
Real Gijón	3–3	RCD Español
UD Las Palmas	0–0	CD Tenerife

- Second tiebreaker

Team 1	Score	Team 2
Real Gijón	2–1	RCD Español
UD Las Palmas	1–0	CD Tenerife

== Round of 16 ==
Team 1	Agg.	Team 2	1st leg	2nd leg
Club Atlético de Bilbao	4–3	UD Las Palmas	2–2	2–1
CF Barcelona	4–2	Real Murcia	4–1	0–1
Deportivo La Coruña	1–2	Real Gijón	0–2	1–0
Real Madrid CF	1–4	Club Atlético de Madrid	1–0	0–4
RCD Mallorca	0–2	Pontevedra CF	0–0	0–2
CA Osasuna	2–5	Real Sociedad	2–1	0–4
Valencia CF	2–1	Córdoba CF	2–1	0–0
Real Zaragoza CD	9–5	Levante UD	7–2	2–3

Source: RSSSF

== Quarter-finals ==
Team 1	Agg.	Team 2	1st leg	2nd leg
Pontevedra CF	0–4	Club Atlético de Bilbao	0–3	0–1
Real Sociedad	3–2	Real Gijón	3–2	0–0
Valencia CF	0–3	Club Atlético de Madrid	0–1	0–2
Real Zaragoza CD	7–4	CF Barcelona	6–4	1–0

Source: RSSSF

== Semi-finals ==
Team 1	Agg.	Team 2	1st leg	2nd leg
Club Atlético de Madrid	11–4	Real Sociedad de Fútbol	8–1	3–3
Real Zaragoza CD	7–2	Club Atlético de Bilbao	5–0	2–2

Source: RSSSF

== Final ==
Team 1	Score	Team 2
Club Atlético de Madrid	1–0	Real Zaragoza CD

Copa del Generalísimo
winners
Club Atlético de Madrid
3rd title
