= 1965–66 La Liga =

35th season of La Liga

Primera División
- Season: 1965–66
- Champions: Atlético Madrid (5th title)
- Relegated: Málaga; Mallorca; Real Betis
- European Cup: Atlético Madrid; Real Madrid (as title holders)
- Cup Winners' Cup: Zaragoza
- Matches: 240
- Goals: 609 (2.54 per match)
- Top goalscorer: Vavá II (19 goals)
- Biggest home win: Atlético Bilbao 6–1 Real Betis; Atlético Madrid 6–1 Sevilla; Zaragoza 6–1 Elche; Barcelona 5–0 Sabadell
- Biggest away win: Real Betis 0–4 Córdoba
- Highest scoring: Valencia 6–3 Real Betis

The 1965–66 La Liga was the 35th season of La Liga since its establishment. The season began on 4 September 1965, and concluded on 3 April 1966.

== Team locations ==
Location of teams in La Liga 1965–66
Canary Islands

Team	Home city	Stadium
Atlético Bilbao	Bilbao	San Mamés
Atlético Madrid	Madrid	Metropolitano
Barcelona	Barcelona	Nou Camp
Córdoba	Córdoba	El Arcángel
Elche	Elche	Altabix
Español	Barcelona	Sarrià
Las Palmas	Las Palmas	Insular
Málaga	Málaga	La Rosaleda
Mallorca	Palma	Lluís Sitjar
Pontevedra	Pontevedra	Pasarón
Real Betis	Seville	Benito Villamarín
Real Madrid	Madrid	Santiago Bernabéu
Sabadell	Sabadell	Creu Alta
Sevilla	Seville	Ramón Sánchez Pizjuán
Valencia	Valencia	Mestalla
Zaragoza	Zaragoza	La Romareda

== League table ==
Pos	Team	Pld	W	D	L	GF	GA	GD	Pts	Qualification or relegation
1	Atlético Madrid (C)	30	18	8	4	54	20	+34	44	Qualification for the European Cup first round
2	Real Madrid	30	19	5	6	53	30	+23	43	Qualification for the European Cup second round (Note: Real Madrid qualified for the European Cup as title holders.)
3	Barcelona	30	16	6	8	51	27	+24	38	Invited for the Inter-Cities Fairs Cup
4	Zaragoza	30	14	8	8	47	29	+18	36	Qualification for the Cup Winners' Cup first round (Note: Zaragoza qualified to the Cup Winners' Cup as champions of the Copa del Generalísimo.)
5	Atlético Bilbao	30	14	6	10	43	32	+11	34	Invited for the Inter-Cities Fairs Cup
6	Elche	30	12	8	10	36	37	−1	32	
7	Pontevedra	30	13	5	12	31	34	−3	31	
8	Sevilla	30	9	9	12	27	38	−11	27	Invited for the Inter-Cities Fairs Cup
9	Valencia	30	11	5	14	40	35	+5	27	Invited for the Inter-Cities Fairs Cup
10	Las Palmas	30	9	8	13	32	39	−7	26	
11	Córdoba	30	10	5	15	34	42	−8	25	
12	Español	30	7	10	13	31	48	−17	24	
13	Málaga (R)	30	8	8	14	24	37	−13	24	Qualification for the relegation play-offs
14	Sabadell (O)	30	10	3	17	30	46	−16	23	Qualification for the relegation play-offs
15	Mallorca (R)	30	9	5	16	40	55	−15	23	Relegation to the Segunda División
16	Real Betis (R)	30	7	9	14	36	60	−24	23	Relegation to the Segunda División

Source: BDFútbol
Rules for classification: 1) Points; 2) Head-to-head results; 3) Goal difference; 4) Number of goals scored
(C) Champions; (O) Play-off winners; (R) Relegated

== Results ==
Home \ Away	ATB	ATM	BAR	BET	CÓR	ELC	ESP	LPA	MÁL	MLL	PON	RMA	SAB	SEV	VAL	ZAR
Atlético Bilbao	—	0–2	1–0	6–1	3–2	2–0	3–1	1–1	1–1	4–0	2–0	2–0	3–0	1–0	1–0	2–0
Atlético Madrid	1–0	—	0–1	3–0	2–0	3–0	5–2	2–0	1–0	1–0	4–0	1–1	3–0	6–1	2–2	0–1
CF Barcelona	1–0	1–4	—	4–1	3–1	0–0	4–2	3–2	4–0	3–1	3–0	2–1	5–0	3–0	1–2	0–1
Betis	2–0	1–2	0–0	—	0–4	2–1	1–1	1–0	4–0	1–2	3–0	1–2	2–1	1–2	1–1	1–0
Córdoba CF	1–0	0–1	0–0	3–3	—	1–0	2–1	1–1	1–0	2–0	0–2	1–2	3–0	0–0	1–0	2–1
Elche CF	0–0	0–0	1–0	1–1	2–0	—	3–0	1–1	0–2	3–2	2–0	1–0	0–0	1–1	2–1	3–1
RCD Español	3–4	0–2	1–1	1–1	1–0	0–3	—	1–1	3–2	1–1	2–0	1–1	2–1	1–0	2–0	1–1
UD Las Palmas	1–1	1–1	2–1	4–1	5–1	1–0	1–1	—	2–0	0–0	0–1	1–2	1–0	1–0	0–2	2–1
CD Málaga	2–0	1–1	1–0	1–1	1–3	0–1	0–0	1–0	—	2–1	0–0	0–0	2–0	0–1	2–1	0–1
RCD Mallorca	3–1	0–0	1–2	4–0	2–1	4–2	3–0	4–1	2–2	—	0–3	2–5	0–1	2–1	2–0	0–0
Pontevedra CF	3–0	1–0	2–0	0–0	1–1	1–1	3–0	1–0	3–0	2–1	—	1–3	2–1	2–1	2–0	1–1
Real Madrid	2–0	3–1	1–3	2–0	2–1	2–1	0–0	3–1	1–0	5–1	1–0	—	1–0	4–0	2–1	2–0
CE Sabadell FC	1–2	0–1	1–3	4–1	2–1	3–4	2–0	1–0	3–2	1–0	1–0	1–1	—	2–2	0–1	3–1
Sevilla CF	0–0	1–1	1–1	1–1	2–1	2–0	0–2	0–1	0–1	3–1	1–0	2–1	2–0	—	1–1	1–1
Valencia CF	1–1	1–2	0–2	6–3	1–0	1–2	2–1	4–0	1–0	4–1	4–0	3–0	0–1	0–1	—	0–0
Zaragoza	3–2	2–2	0–0	4–1	4–0	6–1	1–0	3–1	1–1	4–0	2–0	2–3	1–0	2–0	2–0	—

Source: BDFútbol
Legend: Blue = home team win; Yellow = draw; Red = away team win.

== Relegation play-offs ==
Team 1	Agg.	Team 2	1st leg	2nd leg
Sabadell	2–0	Celta Vigo	2–0	0–0
Granada	3–2	Málaga	2–1	1–1

== Pichichi Trophy ==
Rank	Player	Club	Goals
1	(Spain) Vavá II	Elche	19
2	(Spain) Luis Aragonés	Atlético Madrid	18
3	(Spain) Nemesio Martín	Pontevedra	14
3	(Spain) Javier Ormaza Garay	Atlético Bilbao	14
5	(Uruguay) Danny Bergara	Mallorca	13
