= 1963–64 Segunda División =

33rd season of the second-tier football league in Spain

Segunda División
- Season: 1963–64
- Champions: Deportivo La Coruña; Las Palmas
- Promoted: Deportivo La Coruña; Las Palmas
- Relegated: Salamanca; San Fernando; Alavés; Eldense
- Matches: 480
- Goals: 1,292 (2.69 per match)
- Top goalscorer: Abel Fernández (26 goals)
- Best goalkeeper: José María Cobo (0.89 goals/match)
- Biggest home win: Deportivo La Coruña 8–0 Constancia (10 November 1963)
- Biggest away win: Badalona 2–7 Deportivo La Coruña (19 January 1964)
- Highest scoring: Deportivo La Coruña 8–2 Alavés (22 March 1964)

The 1963–64 Segunda División season was the 33rd since its establishment and was played between 15 September 1963 and 26 April 1964.

== Overview before the season ==
32 teams joined the league, including 4 relegated from the 1962–63 La Liga and 7 promoted from the 1962–63 Tercera División.

Relegated from La Liga

- Mallorca
- Deportivo La Coruña
- Osasuna
- Málaga

Promoted from Tercera División

- Europa
- Onteniente
- Abarán
- Atlético Ceuta
- Badalona
- Hospitalet
- Algeciras

== Group North ==
=== Teams ===
Location of teams in Segunda División 1963–64 Group North

Club	City	Stadium
Deportivo Alavés	Vitoria	Mendizorroza
CF Badalona	Badalona	Avenida de Navarra
Burgos CF	Burgos	Zatorre
RC Celta de Vigo	Vigo	Balaídos
CD Constancia	Inca	Municipal d'Es Cos
RC Deportivo La Coruña	La Coruña	Riazor
CD Europa	Barcelona	Cerdeña
Real Gijón CF	Gijón	El Molinón
CD Hospitalet	Hospitalet de Llobregat	Municipal de Deportes
SD Indauchu	Bilbao	Garellano
UP Langreo	Langreo	Ganzábal
CD Orense	Orense	José Antonio
Atlético Osasuna	Pamplona	San Juan
Real Sociedad	San Sebastián	Atocha
Salamanca	Salamanca	El Calvario
Real Santander SD	Santander	El Sardinero

=== League table ===
Pos	Team	Pld	W	D	L	GF	GA	GD	Pts	Promotion, qualification or relegation
1	Deportivo La Coruña (P)	30	19	4	7	74	31	+43	42	Promotion to La Liga
2	Real Gijón	30	17	5	8	53	33	+20	39	Qualification for the promotion playoffs
3	Europa	30	15	7	8	36	27	+9	37	
4	Racing Santander	30	14	7	9	45	32	+13	35	
5	Osasuna	30	14	6	10	53	44	+9	34	
6	Real Sociedad	30	14	5	11	48	35	+13	33	
7	Burgos	30	13	6	11	40	38	+2	32	
8	Orense	30	12	7	11	34	36	−2	31	
9	Celta Vigo	30	11	7	12	39	37	+2	29	
10	Constancia	30	8	12	10	33	45	−12	28	
11	Langreo	30	10	7	13	33	40	−7	27	
12	Indauchu	30	10	6	14	34	38	−4	26 (Note: Indauchu finished ahead of Hospitalet on head-to-head points: Indauchu–Hospitalet 3–1, Hospitalet–Indauchu 2–2)	
13	Hospitalet (O)	30	10	6	14	39	51	−12	26	Qualification for the relegation playoffs
14	Badalona (O)	30	9	6	15	39	57	−18	24	Qualification for the relegation playoffs
15	Salamanca (R)	30	7	7	16	25	46	−21	21	Relegation to Tercera División
16	Alavés (R)	30	4	8	18	36	71	−35	16	Relegation to Tercera División

Source: BDFútbol
Rules for classification: 1) points; 2) head-to-head points; 3) head-to-head goal difference; 4) goal difference; 5) number of goals scored
(O) Play-off winners; (P) Promoted; (R) Relegated

=== Top goalscorers ===
Goalscorers	Goals	Team
(Spain) Abel Fernández	26	Racing Santander
(Spain) Enrique Silvestre	22	Osasuna
(Spain) José Luis Veloso	17	Deportivo La Coruña
(Spain) Juan Goyarán	17	Alavés
(Spain) Manuel Loureda	15	Deportivo La Coruña

=== Top goalkeepers ===
Goalkeeper	Goals	Matches	Average	Team
(Spain) José María Cobo	24	27	0.89	Real Gijón
(Spain) Rogelio Pàmpols	20	21	0.95	Deportivo La Coruña
(Spain) Juan García	25	26	0.96	Europa
(Spain) Jesús Larzábal	22	22	1	Racing Santander
(Spain) Mariano Martín	22	21	1.05	Indauchu

=== Results ===
Home \ Away	ALA	BAD	BUR	CEL	CON	DEP	EUR	GIJ	HOS	IND	LAN	ORE	OSA	RSO	SAL	SAT
Alavés	—	0–1	2–4	4–1	0–2	2–1	0–1	3–5	1–1	2–2	1–2	2–3	1–4	1–0	0–1	2–3
Badalona	7–1	—	4–2	1–1	2–0	2–7	0–0	1–0	2–1	3–1	2–1	1–1	2–0	3–3	0–1	0–2
Burgos	1–1	1–0	—	1–1	4–1	2–3	0–2	2–1	3–0	1–0	2–1	0–1	3–2	0–3	4–0	2–1
Celta Vigo	4–0	5–0	3–0	—	2–1	1–0	3–2	1–4	0–0	1–0	0–2	2–0	1–2	2–0	1–1	2–0
Constancia	2–2	2–2	2–2	3–0	—	1–0	1–1	1–1	0–0	2–1	1–0	0–0	2–0	3–2	3–2	1–1
Deportivo	8–2	3–0	0–0	2–1	8–0	—	2–0	4–1	4–0	0–0	2–1	5–0	3–0	2–1	2–0	0–1
Europa	3–2	2–1	1–0	0–0	1–1	2–0	—	2–0	1–0	3–0	0–0	1–1	0–1	3–1	2–0	1–0
Gijón	5–0	4–1	1–0	1–2	2–0	2–2	1–0	—	2–1	1–0	3–1	0–1	1–1	5–2	4–1	1–0
Hospitalet	3–2	3–1	2–0	2–1	2–1	3–3	1–1	0–1	—	2–2	3–0	2–0	0–2	1–3	2–1	4–1
Indauchu	0–0	3–1	3–0	2–1	2–1	1–2	4–1	0–2	3–1	—	2–1	3–1	2–2	0–3	0–0	0–0
Langreo	0–0	3–0	1–0	1–1	4–1	1–4	0–2	0–1	2–1	0–0	—	1–1	1–0	0–0	2–0	1–0
Orense	3–0	1–0	0–2	1–1	2–0	2–0	3–0	1–0	0–1	2–0	1–3	—	4–1	0–2	2–0	2–2
Osasuna	2–2	4–0	0–1	2–1	1–0	4–1	1–0	3–3	2–1	1–1	6–2	3–0	—	0–1	3–2	4–4
Real Sociedad	1–0	1–1	1–1	2–0	0–0	1–3	1–2	0–1	5–0	2–1	3–0	2–1	1–0	—	2–1	0–1
Salamanca	0–2	1–0	1–1	1–0	0–0	0–1	1–2	0–0	3–1	2–1	2–2	0–0	1–2	2–1	—	1–2
Santander	1–1	3–1	0–1	2–0	1–1	0–2	2–0	3–0	4–1	0–0	1–0	2–0	3–0	1–4	4–0	—

Source: BDFútbol
Legend: Blue = home team win; Yellow = draw; Red = away team win.

== Group South ==
=== Teams ===
Location of teams in Segunda División 1963–64 Group South
Canary Islands

Club	City	Stadium
CD Abarán	Abarán	Las Colonias
Algeciras CF	Algeciras	El Mirador
Cádiz CF	Cádiz	Ramón de Carranza
Atlético Ceuta	Ceuta	Alfonso Murube
Eldense	Elda	El Parque
Granada CF	Granada	Los Cármenes
Hércules CF	Alicante	La Viña
UD Las Palmas	Las Palmas	Insular
CD Málaga	Málaga	La Rosaleda
RCD Mallorca	Palma de Mallorca	Luis Sitjar
Melilla CF	Melilla	Álvarez Claro
CD Mestalla	Valencia	Mestalla
Onteniente CF	Onteniente	El Clariano
Recreativo de Huelva	Huelva	Municipal
CD San Fernando	San Fernando	Marqués de Varela
CD Tenerife	Santa Cruz de Tenerife	Heliodoro Rodríguez López

=== League table ===
Pos	Team	Pld	W	D	L	GF	GA	GD	Pts	Promotion, qualification or relegation
1	Las Palmas (P)	30	17	6	7	45	25	+20	40	Promotion to La Liga
2	Hércules	30	15	8	7	48	38	+10	38	Qualification for the promotion playoffs
3	Mallorca	30	16	5	9	52	32	+20	37	
4	Mestalla	30	13	7	10	60	38	+22	33	
5	Tenerife	30	14	4	12	30	40	−10	32 (Note: Tenerife finished ahead of Granada on head-to-head points: Tenerife–Granada 2–2, Granada–Tenerife 0–1)	
6	Granada	30	12	8	10	41	32	+9	32	
7	Cádiz	30	13	4	13	45	41	+4	30 (Note: Cádiz finished ahead of Algeciras and Málaga on head-to-head points: Cádiz 7 pts, Algeciras 4 pts, Málaga 1 pt)	
8	Algeciras	30	13	4	13	40	53	−13	30	
9	Málaga	30	12	6	12	38	33	+5	30	
10	Onteniente	30	10	9	11	33	29	+4	29 (Note: Onteniente finished ahead of Recreativo on head-to-head goal difference: Onteniente–Recreativo 3–1, Recreativo–Onteniente 1–0)	
11	Recreativo	30	10	9	11	41	34	+7	29	
12	Melilla	30	10	8	12	34	38	−4	28	
13	Abarán (O)	30	10	6	14	38	49	−11	26 (Note: Abarán finished ahead of Atlético Ceuta on head-to-head goal difference: Atlético Ceuta–Abarán 2–1, Abarán–Atlético Ceuta 4–1)	Qualification for the relegation playoffs
14	Atlético Ceuta (O)	30	10	6	14	29	49	−20	26	Qualification for the relegation playoffs
15	San Fernando (R)	30	9	3	18	24	45	−21	21	Relegation to Tercera División
16	Eldense (R)	30	7	5	18	33	55	−22	19	Relegation to Tercera División

Source: BDFútbol
Rules for classification: 1) points; 2) head-to-head points; 3) head-to-head goal difference; 4) goal difference; 5) number of goals scored
(O) Play-off winners; (P) Promoted; (R) Relegated

=== Top goalscorers ===
Goalscorers	Goals	Team
(Spain) Juan Ramón Arana	19	Hércules
(Spain) Vicente Navarro	16	Mestalla
(Spain) Rafael Blanco	15	Cádiz
(Spain) Pepillo	14	Mallorca
(Spain) José Tapia	13	Algeciras

=== Top goalkeepers ===
Goalkeeper	Goals	Matches	Average	Team
(Spain) Américo Canas	27	30	0.9	Málaga
(Spain) Juan Moreno	29	30	0.97	Onteniente
(Spain) Juan Ignacio Otero	25	25	1	Granada
(Spain) Juan Galán	30	29	1.03	Mallorca
(Spain) Joaquín Valero	28	23	1.22	Mestalla

=== Results ===
Home \ Away	ABA	ALG	CÁD	CEU	ELD	GRA	HÉR	LPA	MGA	MLL	MEL	MES	ONT	REC	SFE	TEN
Abarán	—	2–0	1–0	4–1	5–1	1–1	0–1	0–3	2–0	0–1	3–1	4–2	1–1	2–1	1–0	3–0
Algeciras	1–1	—	2–4	1–1	3–1	1–0	2–1	2–1	3–1	2–1	3–1	1–2	2–0	0–0	3–1	2–0
Cádiz	4–2	1–0	—	2–0	2–1	2–1	1–2	3–0	4–2	1–2	2–0	2–2	2–0	0–0	3–0	3–0
Atlético Ceuta	2–1	2–2	2–1	—	3–1	0–0	3–2	1–0	1–0	2–1	0–0	1–1	1–0	1–1	3–0	0–1
Eldense	1–1	1–2	2–1	4–2	—	1–1	1–1	2–0	1–2	3–0	1–1	1–2	2–1	2–1	4–1	0–1
Granada	1–1	2–0	2–0	0–1	4–0	—	0–0	2–1	4–1	4–1	3–0	2–1	2–1	1–0	1–0	0–1
Hércules	2–1	4–0	4–1	1–0	3–1	2–0	—	1–1	1–0	1–3	1–1	1–0	1–1	1–0	2–0	2–1
Las Palmas	3–0	3–0	1–0	3–1	3–0	1–0	4–3	—	1–1	2–0	1–0	1–1	3–0	2–1	3–0	1–0
Málaga	3–0	0–2	2–2	2–0	3–0	1–1	1–1	0–1	—	0–0	2–0	2–0	1–0	1–1	5–0	3–0
Mallorca	6–0	6–1	2–1	3–0	1–1	2–1	3–1	2–0	2–0	—	4–1	1–0	0–2	2–1	1–0	3–0
Melilla	2–0	2–0	0–1	3–0	2–0	3–0	5–2	1–1	3–1	1–1	—	2–1	1–0	0–0	0–0	2–0
Mestalla	4–0	7–1	3–0	5–0	2–1	1–2	5–2	1–1	0–1	2–1	4–1	—	2–2	2–2	2–0	3–0
Onteniente	1–1	2–0	0–0	2–0	2–0	1–0	0–1	1–0	1–0	1–1	0–0	2–2	—	3–1	2–0	5–1
Recreativo	4–1	4–2	4–1	3–0	2–0	3–3	1–1	0–1	0–1	1–1	1–0	2–1	1–0	—	2–1	4–1
San Fernando	1–0	0–1	2–1	1–0	2–0	3–1	2–2	1–2	1–2	1–0	3–1	1–2	1–0	2–0	—	0–0
Tenerife	1–0	2–1	2–0	4–1	1–0	2–2	0–1	1–1	1–0	2–1	3–0	1–0	2–2	1–0	1–0	—

Source: BDFútbol
Legend: Blue = home team win; Yellow = draw; Red = away team win.

== Promotion playoffs ==
=== First leg ===
7 June 1964	Oviedo	4–1	Hércules	Oviedo
	José María 26'; Iglesias 32', 88'; José Luis 53'	Report	José Juan 80'	Stadium: Carlos Tartiere; Referee: Plaza Pedraz

14 June 1964	Real Gijón	1–0	Espanyol	Gijón
	Montes 55'	Report		Stadium: El Molinón; Referee: Zariquiegui Izco

=== Second leg ===
14 June 1964	Hércules	1–0 (2–4 agg.)	Oviedo	Alicante
	Arana 55'	Report		Stadium: La Viña; Referee: Ortiz de Mendibil

21 June 1964	Espanyol	3–0 (3–1 agg.)	Real Gijón	Barcelona
	Kubala 13'; Muñoz 15'; Idígoras 70'	Report		Stadium: Sarrià; Referee: Gómez Arribas

== Relegation playoffs ==
=== First leg ===
21 June 1964	Gimnástica Torrelavega	1–3	Badalona	Torrelavega
	Ceballos 12'	Report	Rangil 39'; Florit 54'; Gasull 89'	Stadium: El Malecón; Referee: Rivero Lecuona

21 June 1964	Extremadura	1–2	Abarán	Almendralejo
	Bizcocho 55'	Report	Alonso 65'; Martos 75'	Stadium: Francisco de la Hera; Referee: Varas Gómez

21 June 1964	Gimnástico	3–1	Hospitalet	Tarragona
	Serer 14'; Rifé 22', 60'	Report	Arnás 25'	Stadium: Avenida de Cataluña; Referee: Urrestarazu Elordi

21 June 1964	Cartagena	1–1	Atlético Ceuta	Cartagena
	Blanqueras 15'	Report	Toto 11'	Stadium: El Almarjal; Referee: David Aguado

=== Second leg ===
28 June 1964	Badalona	6–1 (9–2 agg.)	Gimnástica Torrelavega	Badalona
	Peñalver 4', 24', 42'; Toll 6'; Robles 35'; Viñas 76'	Report	Gómez 75'	Stadium: Avenida de Navarra; Referee: López Montenegro

28 June 1964	Abarán	2–1 (4–2 agg.)	Extremadura	Abarán
	Martos 73'; Besó 75'	Report	Rufo 68'	Stadium: Las Colonias; Referee: Sánchez Ríos

28 June 1964	Hospitalet	2–0 (3–3 agg.)	Gimnástico	L'Hospitalet de Llobregat
	Vacunín 15'; Llorens 57'	Report		Stadium: Municipal; Referee: Medina Iglesias

28 June 1964	Atlético Ceuta	2–0 (3–1 agg.)	Cartagena	Ceuta
	Toto 55'; Castillo 75'	Report		Stadium: Alfonso Murube; Referee: Menéndez de León

=== Tiebreaker ===
30 June 1964	Hospitalet	2–0	Gimnástico	Barcelona
	Llorens 2', 50' (pen.)	Report		Stadium: Camp Nou; Referee: Canera Coscolín
