= 1964–65 Segunda División =

34th season of the second-tier football league in Spain

Segunda División
- Season: 1964–65
- Champions: Pontevedra; Mallorca
- Promoted: Pontevedra; Mallorca; Sabadell; Málaga
- Relegated: Orense; Onteniente; Real Unión; Abarán
- Matches: 480
- Goals: 1,258 (2.62 per match)
- Top goalscorer: José María Lizarralde (20 goals)
- Best goalkeeper: Rodri (0.43 goals/match)
- Biggest home win: Indauchu 8–0 Europa (18 October 1964)
- Biggest away win: Abarán 0–4 Granada (17 January 1965)
- Highest scoring: Real Gijón 9–2 Real Unión (11 October 1964)

The 1964–65 Segunda División season was the 34th since its establishment and was played between 13 September 1964 and 18 April 1965.

== Overview before the season ==
32 teams joined the league, including two relegated from the 1963–64 La Liga and 4 promoted from the 1963–64 Tercera División.

Relegated from La Liga

- Pontevedra
- Valladolid

Promoted from Tercera División

- Baracaldo
- Real Unión
- Sabadell
- Calvo Sotelo

== Group North ==
=== Teams ===
Location of teams in Segunda División 1964–65 Group North

Club	City	Stadium
CF Badalona	Badalona	Avenida de Navarra
Club Baracaldo Altos Hornos	Baracaldo	Lasesarre
Burgos CF	Burgos	El Plantío
RC Celta de Vigo	Vigo	Balaídos
CD Europa	Barcelona	Cerdeña
Real Gijón CF	Gijón	El Molinón
CD Hospitalet	Hospitalet de Llobregat	Municipal de Deportes
SD Indauchu	Bilbao	Garellano
UP Langreo	Langreo	Ganzábal
CD Orense	Orense	José Antonio
Atlético Osasuna	Pamplona	San Juan
Pontevedra CF	Pontevedra	Pasarón
Real Sociedad	San Sebastián	Atocha
Real Unión de Irún	Irun	Stadium Gal
CD Sabadell CF	Sabadell	Cruz Alta
Real Santander SD	Santander	El Sardinero

=== League table ===
Pos	Team	Pld	W	D	L	GF	GA	GD	Pts	Promotion, qualification or relegation
1	Pontevedra (P)	30	20	5	5	48	17	+31	45	Promotion to La Liga
2	Sabadell (O, P)	30	16	7	7	46	28	+18	39	Qualification for the promotion playoffs
3	Real Gijón	30	13	12	5	61	32	+29	38	
4	Real Sociedad	30	13	6	11	60	44	+16	32	
5	Celta Vigo	30	11	8	11	35	34	+1	30	
6	Burgos	30	10	9	11	47	46	+1	29 (Note: Burgos finished ahead of Racing Santander and Indautxu on head-to-head points: Burgos 5 pts, Racing Santander 4 pts, Indautxu 3 pts)	
7	Racing Santander	30	10	9	11	52	51	+1	29	
8	Indauchu	30	9	11	10	47	44	+3	29	
9	Baracaldo	30	11	6	13	41	44	−3	28 (Note: Baracaldo finished ahead of Osasuna on head-to-head points: Osasuna–Baracaldo 2–3, Baracaldo–Osasuna 0–0)	
10	Osasuna	30	11	6	13	30	35	−5	28	
11	Hospitalet	30	12	3	15	48	56	−8	27 (Note: Hospitalet finished ahead of Langreo and Europa on head-to-head points: Hospitalet 6 pts, Langreo 5 pts, Europa 1 pt)	
12	Langreo	30	11	5	14	40	51	−11	27	
13	Europa (O)	30	9	9	12	30	43	−13	27	Qualification for the relegation playoffs
14	Badalona (O)	30	7	11	12	31	43	−12	25 (Note: Badalona finished ahead of Orense on head-to-head points: Orense–Badalona 1–1, Badalona–Orense 2–0)	Qualification for the relegation playoffs
15	Orense (R)	30	7	11	12	33	50	−17	25	Relegation to Tercera División
16	Real Unión (R)	30	7	8	15	24	55	−31	22	Relegation to Tercera División

Source: BDFútbol
Rules for classification: 1) points; 2) head-to-head points; 3) head-to-head goal difference; 4) goal difference; 5) number of goals scored
(O) Play-off winners; (P) Promoted; (R) Relegated

=== Results ===
Home \ Away	BAD	BAR	BUR	CEL	EUR	GIJ	HOS	IND	LAN	ORE	OSA	PON	RSO	RUN	SAB	RAC
CF Badalona		0–0	3–1	1–1	0–1	1–1	2–3	1–1	2–1	2–0	0–0	0–0	1–0	2–1	1–2	3–0
Club Baracaldo Altos Hornos	2–0		1–1	2–0	4–0	2–2	2–0	3–0	0–2	3–1	0–0	1–2	1–0	2–0	1–1	2–1
Burgos CF	3–0	3–0		1–1	1–1	2–3	2–0	2–0	4–3	3–1	0–0	2–0	3–0	3–0	1–3	5–2
RC Celta de Vigo	4–1	2–0	3–1		0–0	1–1	3–1	1–1	2–0	3–0	1–0	0–1	1–0	2–0	1–2	3–1
CD Europa	2–1	3–0	0–0	1–1		0–0	0–1	1–0	0–1	3–0	1–0	1–0	2–1	6–1	1–1	3–3
Real Gijón CF	1–1	2–1	0–0	2–0	6–1		6–1	3–1	1–0	4–0	0–3	3–1	1–1	9–2	1–0	4–0
CD Hospitalet	2–0	3–2	1–1	2–0	1–0	1–2		4–1	3–2	5–0	4–1	0–3	0–0	3–0	1–1	1–2
SD Indauchu	2–2	4–2	2–2	4–0	8–0	2–2	5–1		1–1	1–1	2–0	1–1	2–0	1–1	0–0	3–2
UP Langreo	2–0	2–0	2–1	2–1	1–1	1–1	2–1	5–1		3–0	3–2	0–1	0–1	1–1	0–0	0–3
CD Orense	1–1	4–1	3–1	0–0	1–0	1–1	2–1	1–2	4–0		3–0	1–1	2–2	2–0	0–2	1–1
Atlético Osasuna	2–0	2–3	2–1	1–0	2–0	1–1	1–2	0–1	2–0	0–0		2–1	0–1	2–1	2–1	2–1
Pontevedra CF	1–0	2–1	4–0	3–1	2–0	1–0	4–1	1–0	3–0	2–0	4–0		3–0	2–0	1–0	2–1
Real Sociedad	7–2	4–2	2–2	1–2	4–1	2–1	5–4	1–1	8–2	5–1	2–1	0–1		1–3	6–2	2–0
Real Unión de Irún	1–1	2–0	1–0	1–1	1–0	0–0	2–0	1–0	2–3	0–0	1–0	0–0	1–3		0–1	0–0
CD Sabadell CF	0–0	0–2	3–0	2–0	2–1	3–2	2–1	2–0	3–0	0–0	0–1	1–0	1–0	5–0		4–2
Real Santander SD	1–3	1–1	5–1	2–0	0–0	2–1	3–0	3–0	2–1	3–3	1–1	1–1	1–1	5–1	3–2	

Source: BDFútbol
Legend: Blue = home team win; Yellow = draw; Red = away team win.

=== Top goalscorers ===
Goalscorers	Goals	Team
(Spain) José María Lizarralde	20	Indauchu
(Spain) Pocholo	18	Real Gijón
(Spain) Francisco Solabarrieta	18	Real Gijón
(Spain) Alfonso Pérez	16	Real Sociedad
(Spain) Abel Fernández	16	Racing Santander

=== Top goalkeepers ===
Goalkeeper	Goals	Matches	Average	Team
(Spain) Rodri	12	28	0.43	Pontevedra
(Spain) José Martínez	27	28	0.96	Sabadell
(Spain) José María Cobo	27	28	0.96	Real Gijón
(Spain) Felipe García	23	21	1.1	Baracaldo
(Spain) José Ramón Ibarreche	34	30	1.13	Celta Vigo

== Group South ==
=== Teams ===
Location of teams in Segunda División 1964–65 Group South
Canary Islands

Club	City	Stadium
CD Abarán	Abarán	Las Colonias
Algeciras CF	Algeciras	El Mirador
Cádiz CF	Cádiz	Ramón de Carranza
CF Calvo Sotelo	Puertollano	Calvo Sotelo
Atlético Ceuta	Ceuta	Alfonso Murube
CD Constancia	Inca	Municipal d'Es Cos
Granada CF	Granada	Los Cármenes
Hércules CF	Alicante	La Viña
CD Málaga	Málaga	La Rosaleda
RCD Mallorca	Palma de Mallorca	Luis Sitjar
Melilla CF	Melilla	Álvarez Claro
CD Mestalla	Valencia	Mestalla
Onteniente CF	Onteniente	El Clariano
Recreativo de Huelva	Huelva	Municipal
CD Tenerife	Santa Cruz de Tenerife	Heliodoro Rodríguez López
Real Valladolid	Valladolid	José Zorrilla

=== League table ===
Pos	Team	Pld	W	D	L	GF	GA	GD	Pts	Promotion, qualification or relegation
1	Mallorca (P)	30	18	6	6	37	23	+14	42	Promotion to La Liga
2	Málaga (O, P)	30	16	6	8	49	26	+23	38	Qualification for the promotion playoffs
3	Valladolid	30	15	5	10	47	24	+23	35	
4	Hércules	30	16	2	12	55	36	+19	34	
5	Atlético Ceuta	30	13	6	11	39	38	+1	32 (Note: Atlético Ceuta finished ahead of Calvo Sotelo and Granada on head-to-head points: Atlético Ceuta 5 pts, Calvo Sotelo 4 pts, Granada 3 pts)	
6	Calvo Sotelo	30	13	6	11	40	42	−2	32	
7	Granada	30	11	10	9	45	35	+10	32	
8	Mestalla	30	13	5	12	37	41	−4	31 (Note: Mestalla finished ahead of Recreativo on head-to-head goal difference: Recreativo–Mestalla 1–0, Mestalla–Recreativo 2–0)	
9	Recreativo	30	13	5	12	37	35	+2	31	
10	Algeciras	30	12	4	14	30	30	0	28 (Note: Algeciras finished ahead of Tenerife on head-to-head goal difference: Tenerife–Algeciras 0–2, Algeciras–Tenerife 0–1)	
11	Tenerife	30	11	6	13	24	33	−9	28	
12	Melilla	30	10	7	13	24	34	−10	27	
13	Constancia (O)	30	9	8	13	31	41	−10	26	Qualification for the relegation playoffs
14	Cádiz (O)	30	8	9	13	35	44	−9	25	Qualification for the relegation playoffs
15	Onteniente (R)	30	8	5	17	35	50	−15	21	Relegation to Tercera División
16	Abarán (R)	30	6	6	18	20	53	−33	18	Relegation to Tercera División

Source: BDFútbol
Rules for classification: 1) points; 2) head-to-head points; 3) head-to-head goal difference; 4) goal difference; 5) number of goals scored
(O) Play-off winners; (P) Promoted; (R) Relegated

=== Results ===
Home \ Away	ABA	ALG	CEU	CAD	CAL	CON	GRA	HER	MAL	MLL	MEL	MES	ONT	REC	TEN	VAL
CD Abarán		0–3	1–2	1–1	1–2	2–1	0–4	1–1	0–2	0–3	1–1	1–2	1–0	2–0	2–0	0–1
Algeciras CF	3–0		0–1	2–0	1–0	0–1	1–0	2–0	0–1	3–0	1–0	0–2	0–0	1–0	0–1	1–1
Atlético Ceuta	1–0	0–3		3–1	1–0	3–3	3–2	3–1	3–2	1–0	2–0	0–1	3–0	2–1	3–0	0–0
Cádiz CF	2–0	2–3	4–0		1–1	3–1	0–2	2–1	1–0	2–1	0–0	1–1	0–1	3–1	0–1	0–0
CF Calvo Sotelo	2–0	1–1	3–1	2–0		3–1	3–2	2–1	0–1	3–0	0–0	1–1	3–1	5–1	2–1	1–1
CD Constancia	1–1	1–0	1–0	0–0	2–0		2–2	1–0	1–0	0–1	4–0	3–1	1–0	1–1	1–1	1–2
Granada CF	2–2	2–0	2–2	2–0	1–0	6–0		1–1	2–2	1–1	0–0	2–0	4–0	1–0	2–0	1–0
Hércules CF	6–0	5–1	2–1	4–1	2–0	4–1	5–1		3–1	1–0	1–2	3–0	3–2	2–0	2–0	2–1
CD Málaga	2–0	3–0	1–0	6–1	7–0	1–0	1–1	2–0		1–1	1–0	3–0	3–2	0–2	2–1	2–0
RCD Mallorca	1–0	1–0	0–0	2–1	3–1	2–0	1–1	1–0	1–1		1–0	1–0	4–0	2–1	1–0	1–0
Melilla CF	4–2	1–1	1–0	3–3	0–2	1–0	1–0	0–2	1–0	0–1		2–1	1–0	2–1	0–2	1–0
CD Mestalla	0–1	1–0	1–1	2–1	0–2	3–1	1–1	2–1	3–1	1–2	1–0		3–3	2–0	3–0	1–4
Onteniente CF	0–1	3–1	2–1	1–1	4–0	1–0	2–0	1–2	2–2	1–1	3–1	0–2		2–0	0–1	1–3
Recreativo	0–0	2–0	2–2	1–0	2–1	1–1	2–0	2–0	1–0	4–2	1–0	1–0	3–2		5–0	2–1
CD Tenerife	3–0	0–2	1–0	1–1	0–0	1–0	2–0	3–0	0–0	0–1	1–1	1–2	1–0	0–0		1–0
Real Valladolid	3–0	1–0	3–0	1–3	5–0	1–1	3–0	2–0	0–1	0–1	2–1	4–0	4–1	1–0	3–1	

Source: BDFútbol
Legend: Blue = home team win; Yellow = draw; Red = away team win.

=== Top goalscorers ===
Goalscorers	Goals	Team
(Spain) José Martínez	18	Valladolid
(Spain) Miguel Sánchez	17	Granada
(Spain) Pepillo	12	Málaga
(Spain) Juan Ramón Arana	12	Hércules
(Spain) Ramón Navarro	11	Hércules

=== Top goalkeepers ===
Goalkeeper	Goals	Matches	Average	Team
(Spain) José Antonio Omist	14	20	0.7	Algeciras
(Spain) José Vicente	23	28	0.82	Mallorca
(Spain) Juanito	22	25	0.88	Málaga
(Spain) Juan Ignacio Otero	23	23	1	Granada
(Spain) Antonio Gómez	26	25	1.04	Tenerife

== Promotion playoffs ==
=== First leg ===
6 June 1965	Málaga	4–2	Levante	Málaga
	Velázquez 3'; Pepillo 14', 48'; Berruezo 18'	Report	Domínguez 4'; Serafín 80' (pen.)	Stadium: La Rosaleda; Referee: Bueno Perales

6 June 1965	Murcia	2–2	Sabadell	Murcia
	Lalo 31'; Ruiz 83' (pen.)	Report	Cabello 5', 64'	Stadium: La Condomina; Referee: Gardeazabal Garay

=== Second leg ===
13 June 1965	Levante	0–0 (2–4 agg.)	Málaga	Valencia
		Report		Stadium: Vallejo; Referee: Plaza Pedraz

13 June 1965	Sabadell	1–0 (3–2 agg.)	Murcia	Sabadell
	Cabello 75'	Report		Stadium: Creu Alta; Referee: Gómez Arribas

== Relegation playoffs ==
=== First leg ===
13 June 1965	Eibar	2–0	Cádiz	Eibar
	Gárate 37'; Ocariz 68'	Report		Stadium: Ipurua; Referee: Pardo Hidalgo

13 June 1965	Béjar Industrial	1–0	Constancia	Béjar
	Expedito 5'	Report		Stadium: Mario Emilio; Referee: Ibáñez Alarcón

13 June 1965	Cartagena	3–1	Badalona	Cartagena
	Pons 13' (pen.); Blanqueras 28'; Vitaller 45'	Report	Moreno 41'	Stadium: El Almarjal; Referee: Morilla Martínez

13 June 1965	Gimnástico	2–4	Europa	Tarragona
	Fretes 67', 86'	Report	Díaz 6', 74'; Vives 43'; Joseíto 46'	Stadium: Avinguda Catalunya; Referee: Irastorza Gutiérrez

=== Second leg ===
20 June 1965	Cádiz	2–0 (2–2 agg.)	Eibar	Cádiz
	Ramón 50'; Juanito 75' (pen.)	Report		Stadium: Ramón de Carranza; Referee: Sánchez Ibáñez

20 June 1965	Constancia	1–0 (1–1 agg.)	Béjar Industrial	Inca
	Beitia 29'	Report		Stadium: Es Cos; Referee: Sabriá Casals

20 June 1965	Badalona	4–1 (5–4 agg.)	Cartagena	Badalona
	Barberà 23'; Moreno 46'; Vázquez 58', 84'	Report	Blanqueras 63'	Stadium: Avenida de Navarra; Referee: Saiz Elizondo

20 June 1965	Europa	1–1 (5–3 agg.)	Gimnástico	Barcelona
	Vives 34' (pen.)	Report	Rovira 28'	Stadium: Sardenya; Referee: Peiró Apastegui

=== Tiebreaker ===
22 June 1965	Cádiz	4–1	Eibar	Madrid
	Llona 43'; Juanito 62' (pen.); Haro 70'; Ramón 78'	Report	Gárate 14'	Stadium: Metropolitano; Referee: Menéndez de León

23 June 1965	Constancia	2–1 (a.e.t.)	Béjar Industrial	Palma
	Jiménez 29'; Castilla 109'	Report	Unamuno 49'	Stadium: Lluís Sitjar; Referee: David Aguado
