= 1965–66 Segunda División =

35th season of the second-tier football league in Spain

Segunda División
- Season: 1965–66
- Champions: Deportivo La Coruña; Hércules
- Promoted: Deportivo La Coruña; Hércules; Granada
- Relegated: Hospitalet; Melilla; Baracaldo; Badajoz
- Matches: 480
- Goals: 1,259 (2.62 per match)
- Top goalscorer: Abel Fernández (26 goals)
- Best goalkeeper: José Antonio Fernández (0.62 goals/match)
- Biggest home win: Tenerife 7–0 Constancia (12 September 1965); Levante 7–0 Melilla (19 September 1965); Condal 8–1 Langreo (25 December 1965)
- Biggest away win: Indauchu 0–4 Osasuna (2 January 1966)
- Highest scoring: Real Santander 6–3 Indauchu (5 December 1965); Condal 8–1 Langreo (25 December 1965)

The 1965–66 Segunda División season was the 35th since its establishment and was played between 5 September 1965 and 3 April 1966.

== Overview before the season ==
32 teams joined the league, including 4 relegated from the 1964–65 La Liga and 4 promoted from the 1964–65 Tercera División.

Relegated from La Liga

- Murcia
- Levante
- Oviedo
- Deportivo La Coruña

Promoted from Tercera División

- Condal
- Lérida
- Rayo Vallecano
- Badajoz

== Group North ==
=== Teams ===
Location of teams in Segunda División 1965-66 Group North

Club	City	Stadium
CF Badalona	Badalona	Avenida de Navarra
Baracaldo Altos Hornos	Baracaldo	Lasesarre
Burgos CF	Burgos	El Plantío
RC Celta Vigo	Vigo	Balaídos
CD Condal	Barcelona	CF Barcelona
Deportivo La Coruña	La Coruña	Riazor
CD Europa	Barcelona	Cerdeña
Real Gijón	Gijón	El Molinón
CD Hospitalet	Hospitalet de Llobregat	Municipal de Deportes
SD Indauchu	Bilbao	Garellano
UP Langreo	Langreo	Ganzábal
UD Lérida	Lérida	Campo de Deportes
CA Osasuna	Pamplona	San Juan
Real Oviedo	Oviedo	Carlos Tartiere
Real Sociedad	San Sebastián	Atocha
Real Santander	Santander	El Sardinero

=== League table ===
Pos	Team	Pld	W	D	L	GF	GA	GD	Pts	Promotion, qualification or relegation
1	Deportivo La Coruña (P)	30	18	7	5	53	19	+34	43	Promotion to La Liga
2	Celta Vigo	30	17	5	8	54	28	+26	39	Qualification for the promotion playoffs
3	Real Gijón	30	15	6	9	67	50	+17	36	
4	Oviedo	30	13	8	9	38	22	+16	34	
5	Burgos	30	13	6	11	42	41	+1	32 (Note: Burgos finished ahead of Indautxu and Condal on head-to-head points: Burgos 5 pts, Indauchu 4 pts, Condal 3 pts)	
6	Indauchu	30	14	4	12	47	47	0	32	
7	Condal	30	14	4	12	55	46	+9	32	
8	Real Santander	30	11	9	10	38	40	−2	31 (Note: Real Santander finished ahead of Osasuna and Real Sociedad on head-to-head points: Real Santander 6 pts, Osasuna 4 pts, Real Sociedad 2 pts)	
9	Osasuna	30	13	5	12	39	41	−2	31	
10	Real Sociedad	30	13	5	12	50	48	+2	31	
11	Lérida	30	10	10	10	37	31	+6	30 (Note: Lérida finished ahead of Badalona on head-to-head points: Badalona–Lérida 1–1, Lérida–Badalona 1–0)	
12	Badalona	30	13	4	13	32	41	−9	30	
13	Langreo (O)	30	10	3	17	37	58	−21	23 (Note: Langreo finished ahead of Europa on head-to-head goal difference: Europa–Langreo 1–0, Langreo–Europa 2–0)	Qualification for the relegation playoffs
14	Europa (O)	30	9	5	16	33	49	−16	23	Qualification for the relegation playoffs
15	Hospitalet (R)	30	9	1	20	37	63	−26	19	Relegation to Tercera División
16	Baracaldo (R)	30	5	4	21	24	59	−35	14	Relegation to Tercera División

Source: BDFútbol
Rules for classification: 1) points; 2) head-to-head points; 3) head-to-head goal difference; 4) goal difference; 5) number of goals scored
(O) Play-off winners; (P) Promoted; (R) Relegated

=== Top goalscorers ===
Goalscorers	Goals	Team
(Spain) Abel Fernández	26	Celta Vigo
(Spain) Chapela	19	Deportivo La Coruña
(Spain) Martí Filosia	16	Condal
(Spain) Miguel Ángel Montes	15	Real Gijón
(Spain) Carles Feliu	15	Condal

=== Top goalkeepers ===
Goalkeeper	Goals	Matches	Average	Team
(Spain) Benito Joanet	19	28	0.68	Deportivo La Coruña
(Spain) Rafael Alarcia	22	30	0.73	Oviedo
(Spain) José Ramón Ibarreche	28	30	0.93	Celta Vigo
(Spain) Carlos Patiño	31	30	1.03	Lérida
(Spain) Lucrecio Luquin	30	25	1.2	Osasuna

=== Results ===
Home \ Away	BAD	BAR	BUR	CEL	CON	DEP	EUR	GIJ	HOS	IND	LAN	LÉR	OSA	OVI	RSO	SAT
Badalona	—	1–0	2–1	2–1	2–0	0–1	3–2	2–0	1–0	3–1	4–1	1–1	1–0	1–0	1–1	3–0
Baracaldo Altos Hornos	1–0	—	0–2	2–1	0–2	0–2	4–1	2–3	1–2	1–4	0–2	0–0	2–2	1–1	2–2	0–1
Burgos	1–0	2–0	—	3–2	3–0	2–1	1–1	3–2	4–2	2–1	2–0	1–0	1–3	1–2	2–1	1–1
Celta Vigo	3–0	3–0	4–2	—	3–0	0–0	3–0	2–1	4–0	3–1	1–0	3–0	3–1	2–1	2–0	2–1
Condal	4–1	3–1	1–1	1–1	—	2–2	2–1	6–2	2–0	1–0	8–1	1–0	2–0	1–3	4–1	4–1
Deportivo	4–0	1–0	1–0	0–0	2–1	—	3–0	5–1	3–0	2–0	4–0	1–0	4–0	0–0	5–1	1–0
Europa	1–1	1–2	3–1	2–0	0–0	0–1	—	1–3	2–1	0–1	1–0	3–2	4–0	1–0	2–1	0–0
Gijón	2–1	7–1	3–0	1–1	3–1	2–0	3–1	—	3–0	1–1	6–2	2–1	3–1	1–0	2–1	3–3
Hospitalet	2–0	3–0	0–1	0–2	2–0	1–3	3–1	4–3	—	0–0	2–1	2–1	3–1	1–4	1–2	1–2
Indauchu	4–0	2–1	2–1	1–0	5–3	1–3	2–0	2–1	4–1	—	1–3	1–1	0–4	2–1	2–0	2–1
Langreo	0–0	3–2	2–0	0–2	0–1	1–0	2–0	1–3	4–2	2–1	—	3–1	2–2	0–1	0–1	1–1
Lérida	1–0	0–1	3–3	1–0	3–0	1–1	1–0	2–2	5–1	1–1	2–0	—	1–1	3–0	2–1	2–0
Osasuna	2–0	1–0	1–1	4–1	2–1	1–0	3–0	3–2	3–1	0–1	0–2	0–0	—	1–0	1–0	2–0
Oviedo	4–0	4–0	0–0	1–1	2–0	0–0	3–0	1–0	2–1	1–0	2–0	0–1	2–0	—	2–2	1–2
Real Sociedad	3–1	2–0	2–0	2–1	2–1	4–2	2–4	2–2	2–0	4–1	5–2	2–1	2–0	0–0	—	2–3
Santander	0–1	1–0	1–0	1–3	2–3	1–1	1–1	0–0	2–1	6–3	3–2	0–0	2–0	0–0	2–0	—

Source: BDFútbol
Legend: Blue = home team win; Yellow = draw; Red = away team win.

== Group South ==
=== Teams ===
Location of teams in Segunda División 1965-66 Group South
Canary Islands

Club	City	Stadium
Algeciras CF	Algeciras	El Mirador
CD Badajoz	Badajoz	El Vivero
Cádiz CF	Cádiz	Ramón de Carranza
CF Calvo Sotelo	Puertollano	Calvo Sotelo
Atlético Ceuta	Ceuta	Alfonso Murube
CD Constancia	Inca	Campo Nuevo
Granada CF	Granada	Los Cármenes
Hércules CF	Alicante	La Viña
Levante UD	Valencia	Vallejo
Melilla CF	Melilla	Álvarez Claro
CD Mestalla	Valencia	Mestalla
Real Murcia	Murcia	La Condomina
Rayo Vallecano	Madrid	Vallecas
Recreativo de Huelva	Huelva	Municipal
CD Tenerife	Santa Cruz de Tenerife	Heliodoro Rodríguez López
Real Valladolid	Valladolid	José Zorrilla

=== League table ===
Pos	Team	Pld	W	D	L	GF	GA	GD	Pts	Promotion, qualification or relegation
1	Hércules (P)	30	16	7	7	44	24	+20	39	Promotion to La Liga
2	Granada (O, P)	30	16	5	9	40	29	+11	37	Qualification for the promotion playoffs
3	Algeciras	30	14	7	9	42	29	+13	35 (Note: Algeciras finished ahead of Valladolid on head-to-head points: Algeciras–Valladolid 1–0, Valladolid–Algeciras 2–2)	
4	Valladolid	30	13	9	8	49	32	+17	35	
5	Levante	30	13	8	9	42	22	+20	34	
6	Mestalla	30	10	13	7	45	44	+1	33	
7	Calvo Sotelo	30	13	6	11	33	36	−3	32 (Note: Calvo Sotelo finished ahead of Tenerife on head-to-head points: Calvo Sotelo–Tenerife 2–1, Tenerife–Calvo Sotelo 1–1)	
8	Tenerife	30	13	6	11	40	34	+6	32	
9	Rayo Vallecano	30	12	7	11	37	26	+11	31	
10	Murcia	30	12	5	13	31	37	−6	29 (Note: Murcia finished ahead of Recreativo on head-to-head goal difference: Murcia–Recreativo 2–0, Recreativo–Murcia 1–0)	
11	Recreativo	30	11	7	12	31	30	+1	29	
12	Cádiz	30	10	7	13	25	28	−3	27	
13	Constancia (O)	30	10	6	14	34	49	−15	26	Qualification for the relegation playoffs
14	Atlético Ceuta (O)	30	11	3	16	35	47	−12	25	Qualification for the relegation playoffs
15	Melilla (R)	30	7	6	17	26	51	−25	20	Relegation to Tercera División
16	Badajoz (R)	30	4	8	18	22	58	−36	16	Relegation to Tercera División

Source: BDFútbol
Rules for classification: 1) points; 2) head-to-head points; 3) head-to-head goal difference; 4) goal difference; 5) number of goals scored
(O) Play-off winners; (P) Promoted; (R) Relegated

=== Top goalscorers ===
Goalscorers	Goals	Team
(Spain) Mendi	18	Atlético Ceuta
(Spain) José Juan Gutiérrez	15	Tenerife
(Spain) Juan Ramón Arana	12	Hércules
(Spain) José Luis García	10	Valladolid
(Spain) José Antonio Tejedor	10	Valladolid

=== Top goalkeepers ===
Goalkeeper	Goals	Matches	Average	Team
(Spain) José Antonio Fernández	16	26	0.62	Levante
(Spain) Victoriano Bilbao	14	20	0.7	Hércules
(Spain) Juan Ignacio Otero	20	24	0.83	Granada
(Spain) José Bermúdez	21	25	0.84	Cádiz
(Spain) José Antonio Omist	27	29	0.93	Algeciras

=== Results ===
Home \ Away	ALG	BAD	CÁD	CAL	CEU	CON	GRA	HÉR	LEV	MEL	MES	MUR	RAY	REC	TEN	VLD
Algeciras	—	5–0	0–2	2–0	3–0	2–0	0–1	1–0	1–0	3–1	2–2	0–0	1–0	1–0	4–0	1–0
Badajoz	1–2	—	0–0	2–2	1–0	3–1	1–1	1–4	0–1	3–1	3–3	1–2	0–1	0–2	1–0	0–2
Cádiz	1–2	0–0	—	1–0	3–0	3–0	3–1	2–2	1–1	1–0	1–1	1–0	0–0	1–0	1–3	1–0
Calvo Sotelo	1–0	3–1	1–0	—	1–0	0–0	2–0	1–0	0–0	1–2	3–1	2–1	1–1	1–0	2–1	3–0
Atlético Ceuta	4–2	3–1	3–1	1–0	—	3–0	2–1	1–0	0–1	3–0	2–2	1–2	1–1	1–2	2–0	1–1
Constancia	1–0	0–0	3–1	5–1	1–2	—	2–0	2–2	3–0	0–0	2–1	0–1	3–0	1–0	1–1	2–1
Granada	0–0	3–0	2–0	2–0	2–0	3–0	—	1–0	1–0	1–0	2–2	4–2	3–2	2–1	2–1	3–1
Hércules	2–2	3–0	2–0	2–0	2–0	3–1	2–0	—	1–0	1–0	0–0	2–0	1–0	2–1	1–1	3–3
Levante	2–0	4–0	2–0	0–1	1–0	0–1	2–0	1–0	—	7–0	2–2	6–0	2–2	3–1	1–1	3–1
Melilla	2–3	1–0	0–0	2–3	1–2	3–1	0–0	1–2	2–1	—	1–2	1–0	1–0	0–0	0–1	2–3
Mestalla	2–2	4–0	1–0	2–2	2–0	3–2	0–3	1–0	0–0	1–1	—	1–1	2–1	3–3	3–0	0–2
Murcia	1–1	3–0	0–1	3–1	4–1	2–1	1–0	1–2	0–0	2–1	0–2	—	1–0	2–0	1–0	0–2
Rayo Vallecano	1–0	3–0	1–0	3–0	3–0	3–1	2–0	0–1	0–1	1–1	0–1	4–1	—	2–0	3–1	1–0
Recreativo	1–0	1–1	1–0	1–0	3–1	0–0	0–1	1–1	1–0	3–0	5–1	1–0	1–1	—	1–0	0–0
Tenerife	2–0	2–1	1–0	1–1	2–1	7–0	2–0	1–0	2–0	1–2	3–0	0–0	1–0	3–0	—	1–1
Valladolid	2–2	1–1	1–0	2–0	4–0	4–0	1–1	1–3	1–1	5–0	1–0	1–0	1–1	2–1	5–1	—

Source: BDFútbol
Legend: Blue = home team win; Yellow = draw; Red = away team win.

== Promotion playoffs ==
=== First leg ===
15 May 1966	Granada	2–1	Málaga	Granada
	Santos 59'; Miguel 87'	Report	Otiñano 80'	Stadium: Los Cármenes; Referee: Zariquiegui Izco

22 May 1966	Sabadell	2–0	Celta Vigo	Sabadell
	Torrent 29'; Vall 67'	Report		Stadium: Creu Alta; Referee: Ortiz de Mendibil

=== Second leg ===
22 May 1966	Málaga	1–1 (2–3 agg.)	Granada	Málaga
	Aragón 52'	Report	Eloy 71'	Stadium: La Rosaleda; Referee: Ruiz Alciturri

29 May 1966	Celta Vigo	0–0 (0–2 agg.)	Sabadell	Vigo
		Report		Stadium: Balaídos; Referee: Gardeazabal Garay

== Relegation playoffs ==
=== First leg ===
19 June 1966	Andorra	4–2	Atlético Ceuta	Andorra
	Pepín 10', 20'; Moreno 14'; Mayoral 42'	Report	Mendi 28'; Cervantes 65' (pen.)	Stadium: Calvo Sotelo; Referee: Modol Solé

19 June 1966	Atlético Marbella	1–0	Langreo	Marbella
	Lolo 54'	Report		Stadium: Utrera Molina; Referee: Ortiz Salgado

19 June 1966	Eibar	2–0	Constancia	Eibar
	Iceta 27'; Vergara 30'	Report		Stadium: Ipurua; Referee: Rodríguez Barroso

19 June 1966	Tarrasa	1–0	Europa	Tarrasa
	Barceló 85'	Report		Stadium: Olímpico; Referee: Pascual Tejerina

=== Second leg ===
26 June 1966	Atlético Ceuta	6–1 (8–5 agg.)	Andorra	Ceuta
	Mendi 10', 18', 60', 80'; Espinosa 47'; Escudero 77'	Report	Anta 15' (o.g.)	Stadium: Alfonso Murube; Referee: Rodríguez Barroso

26 June 1966	Langreo	4–1 (4–2 agg.)	Atlético Marbella	Langreo
	Alcorta 2', 20'; Marañón 10'; Santamaría 16'	Report	Azquez 68'	Stadium: Ganzábal; Referee: Orrantia Capelastegui

26 June 1966	Constancia	3–0 (3–2 agg.)	Eibar	Inca
	Tugores 54'; Noda 82' (pen.); Ruiz 85'	Report		Stadium: Nou Camp; Referee: Modol Solé

26 June 1966	Europa	1–0 (1–1 agg.)	Tarrasa	Barcelona
	Villodres 11'	Report		Stadium: Cerdeña; Referee: Olavarria González

=== Tiebreaker ===
29 June 1966	Europa	4–3 (a.e.t.)	Tarrasa	Barcelona
	Elizondo 35'; Díaz 64'; Villodres 76', 154'	Report	Brunet 52'; Trullás 81'; Cristóbal 89'	Stadium: Camp Nou; Referee: Peiró Apastegui
