= 1975–76 Copa del Generalísimo =

74th Copa del Rey

Tournament details
- Country: Spain
- Teams: 112

Final positions
- Champions: Club Atlético de Madrid (5th title)
- Runners-up: Real Zaragoza CD

Tournament statistics
- Matches played: 221

The 1975–76 Copa del Generalísimo was the 74th staging of the Spanish Cup. The competition began on 12 October 1975 and concluded on 26 June 1976 with the final.

This was the last season to be called the Copa del Generalísimo, as Francisco Franco died in November 1975. Since then, it has been called the Copa del Rey.

== First round ==
Team 1	Agg.	Team 2	1st leg	2nd leg
Albacete Balompié	3–3 (5–6 p)	CD Pegaso	3–1	0–2
Club Siero	1–3	CD Málaga	1–0	0–3
CD Constancia	1–3	Real Murcia	1–0	0–3
Club Lemos	0–6	Rayo Vallecano	0–1	0–5
Castilla CF	4–6	AD Almería	2–2	2–4
Zamora CF	1–5	Bilbao Athletic	1–2	0–3
CD Mestalla	3–2	CD Salmantino	2–0	1–2
CD San Fernando	2–4	Real Jaén	2–1	0–3
Atlético Madrileño	6–2	CD Díter Zafra	5–0	1–2
Real Valladolid	5–1	Gerona CF	3–0	2–1
Tarrasa CF	0–1	CD Laredo	0–0	0–1
RCD Mallorca	1–4	Cádiz CF	1–1	0–3
CD Tudelano	4–3	Sociedad Deportiva Cultural Michelín	3–1	1–2
Racing Ferrol	1–0	CDC Moscardó	0–0	1–0
Gimnástico de Tarragona	4–3	SD Huesca	3–1	1–2
CD Turón	6–7	CD Masnou	5–2	1–5
Burgos CF	5–3	Real Unión	4–2	1–1
CD Alavés	4–1	CD Badajoz	3–0	1–1
Cultural Leonesa	3–2	CD Castellón	2–0	1–2
CF Gandía	2–4	Linares CF	1–3	1–1
CD Mirandés	5–4	Sestao SC	3–1	2–3
Barcelona Atlètic	2–3	CD Getafe	2–1	0–2
CD Villena	4–4 (3–5 p)	Xerez CD	2–1	2–3
Vinaroz CF	2–5	CD Sabadell CF	1–1	1–4
CD Olímpico	5–6	CA Osasuna	5–2	0–4
CD Santurce	1–6	RCD Carabanchel	1–1	0–5
CD Basconia	2–1	AD Ceuta	2–0	0–1
Villarreal CF	4–2	CD Eldense	2–1	2–1
Racing Club Portuense	0–4	Recreativo de Huelva	0–0	0–4
CP Cacereño	3–5	UP Langreo	2–0	1–5
CD Orense	2–1	Onteniente CF	1–0	1–1
Balompédica Linense	5–3	Melilla CF	5–1	0–2
Baracaldo CF	3–2	CD Logroñés	2–1	1–1
AD Torrejón	0–2	CD Guecho	0–1	0–1
Deportivo La Coruña	2–3	CD Gijón	1–0	1–3
SD Ibiza	2–1	Atlético Baleares	0–0	2–1
CD Lugo	1–5	Celta Vigo	1–1	0–4
CD Ensidesa	(5–3 p) 2–2	Levante UD	1–0	1–2
Palencia CF	1–4	CD Talavera	1–2	0–2
Club Imperio de Ceuta SD	2–10	Calvo Sotelo CF	0–4	2–6
CD Lagun Onak	1–4	CD Tenerife	1–0	0–4
SD Melilla	(4–3 p) 3–3	Córdoba CF	0–0	3–3
Jerez Industrial CF	0–1	Algeciras CF	0–0	0–1
CD Alfaro	0–1	CD San Andrés	0–0	0–1
CD Manresa	2–3	Pontevedra CF	2–0	0–3
Orihuela Deportiva CF	0–2	Gimnástica de Torrelavega	0–1	0–1
SD Eibar	1–4	Atlético Marbella	0–1	1–3

Source: BDFutbol

== Second round ==
Team 1	Agg.	Team 2	1st leg	2nd leg
Balompédica Linense	2–3	Gimnástico de Tarragona	1–0	1–3
Rayo Vallecano	0–4	Racing de Ferrol	0–1	0–3
RCD Carabanchel	3–2	AD Almería	3–1	0–1
CD Basconia	3–5	CA Osasuna	2–2	1–3
Atlético Marbella	3–4	CD Tudelano	2–1	1–3
CD Pegaso	5–2	Bilbao Athletic	5–1	0–1
UP Langreo	1–5	Real Murcia	1–0	0–5
CD Masnou	2–6	SD Ibiza	2–3	0–3
Baracaldo CF	4–2	Calvo Sotelo CF	2–2	2–0
Real Jaén	0–1	Celta Vigo	0–0	0–1
CD Sabadell CF	1–2	Cádiz CF	1–0	0–2
Xerez CD	4–4 (2–3 p)	CD Mestalla	2–1	2–3
CD Ensidesa	2–2 (1–5 p)	CD Getafe	2–1	0–1
SD Melilla	1–3	CD Málaga	1–1	0–2
CD Mirandés	5–3	CD Guecho	2–1	3–2
Gimnástica de Torrelavega	(6–5 p) 0–0	CD Orense	0–0	0–0
CD Laredo	1–5	Real Valladolid	0–0	1–5
Villarreal CF	2–3	Atlético Madrileño	1–1	1–2
Pontevedra CF	1–3	CD Gijón	1–3	0–0
Algeciras CF	0–5	Burgos CF	0–1	0–4
CD Talavera	4–3	Cultural Leonesa	2–2	2–1
CD San Andrés	4–2	Linares CF	3–1	1–1
CD Alavés	4–6	CD Tenerife	1–0	3–6

Source: BDFutbol

- Bye: Recreativo de Huelva.

== Third round ==
Team 1	Agg.	Team 2	1st leg	2nd leg
CD Tudelano	2–5	RC Celta	1–1	1–4
Atlético Madrileño	1–2	Racing Ferrol	1–0	0–2
CD Gijón	0–3	CD Tenerife	0–1	0–2
Real Valladolid Deportivo	2–0	CD Carabanchel	1–0	1–0
Gimnástica Torrelavega	1–3	CD Talavera	1–2	0–1
CA Osasuna	4–2	CD Mirandés	3–0	1–2
Gimnástico de Tarragona	0–3	CD Pegaso	0–2	0–1
Baracaldo CF	2–4	CD San Andrés	2–0	0–4
CD Mestalla	3–4	SD Ibiza	3–1	0–3
CD Málaga	2–0	CD Getafe	1–0	1–0
Burgos CF	2–4	Cádiz CF	2–1	0–3
Real Murcia CF	2–3	Recreativo Huelva	2–0	0–3

Sources: BDFutbol; RSSSF

== Fourth round ==
Team 1	Agg.	Team 2	1st leg	2nd leg
Atlético Madrid	2–1	Racing Santander	1–0	1–1
Cádiz CF	3–3 (1–2 p)	RC Celta	1–1	2–2
RCD Español	2–1	Elche CF	1–0	1–1
Racing Ferrol	2–6	Real Madrid	1–2	1–4
Sporting Gijón	5–4	Athletic Bilbao	0–2	5–2
Recreativo Huelva	3–4	UD Las Palmas	3–1	0–3
SD Ibiza	2–6	Real Zaragoza	2–1	0–5
Hércules CF	2–0	CD Pegaso	0–0	2–0
CA Osasuna	1–2	CD Málaga	1–1	0–1
UD Salamanca	2–3	FC Barcelona	1–0	1–3
Sevilla FC	2–3	Granada CF	1–1	1–2
CD Talavera	1–3	Real Oviedo CF	0–1	1–2
Valencia CF	3–0	CD San Andrés	3–0	0–0
Real Valladolid Deportivo	2–5	Real Betis Balompié	1–2	1–3

Source: BDFutbol

- Bye: CD Tenerife and Real Sociedad.

== Round of 16 ==
Team 1	Agg.	Team 2	1st leg	2nd leg
Sporting de Gijón	2–3	Atlético Madrid	1–2	1–1
Español	7–5	Málaga	3–2	4–3
Oviedo	0–4	Barcelona	0–0	0–4
Granada	4–6	Zaragoza	3–3	1–3
Tenerife	2–1	Real Madrid	2–0	0–1
Hércules	3–8	Las Palmas	3–1	0–7
Betis	3–2	Valencia	2–0	1–2
Celta	1–2	Real Sociedad	0–0	1–2

Sources: BDFutbol; RSSSF

== Quarter-finals ==
Team 1	Agg.	Team 2	1st leg	2nd leg
Tenerife	1–2	Zaragoza	1–0	0–2
Betis	4–3	Español	3–1	1–2
Barcelona	3–4	Atlético Madrid	2–3	1–1
Las Palmas	3–3 (2–3 p)	Real Sociedad	3–1	0–2

Sources: BDFutbol; RSSSF

== Semi-finals ==
Team 1	Agg.	Team 2	1st leg	2nd leg
Real Sociedad	1–2	Atlético Madrid	0–1	1–1
Zaragoza	3–2	Betis	2–1	1–1

Source: BDFutbol

== Final ==
Team 1	Score	Team 2
Atlético Madrid	1–0	Zaragoza

Copa del Generalísimo
winners
Club Atlético de Madrid
5th title
