= Bonastre (surname) =

Bonastre is a Spanish surname. Notable people with the surname include:

- Berta Bonastre (born 1992), Spanish field hockey player
- Gonzalo Bonastre (born 1981), Spanish footballer
- Silvia Bonastre (born 1981), Spanish field hockey player, sister of Berta
