= Marquitos =

Marquitos may refer to:

- Marquitos (footballer, born 1933)
- Marquitos (footballer, born 1938)
- Marquitos (footballer, born 1987)
