= Fernando Currás =

Spanish footballer and manager

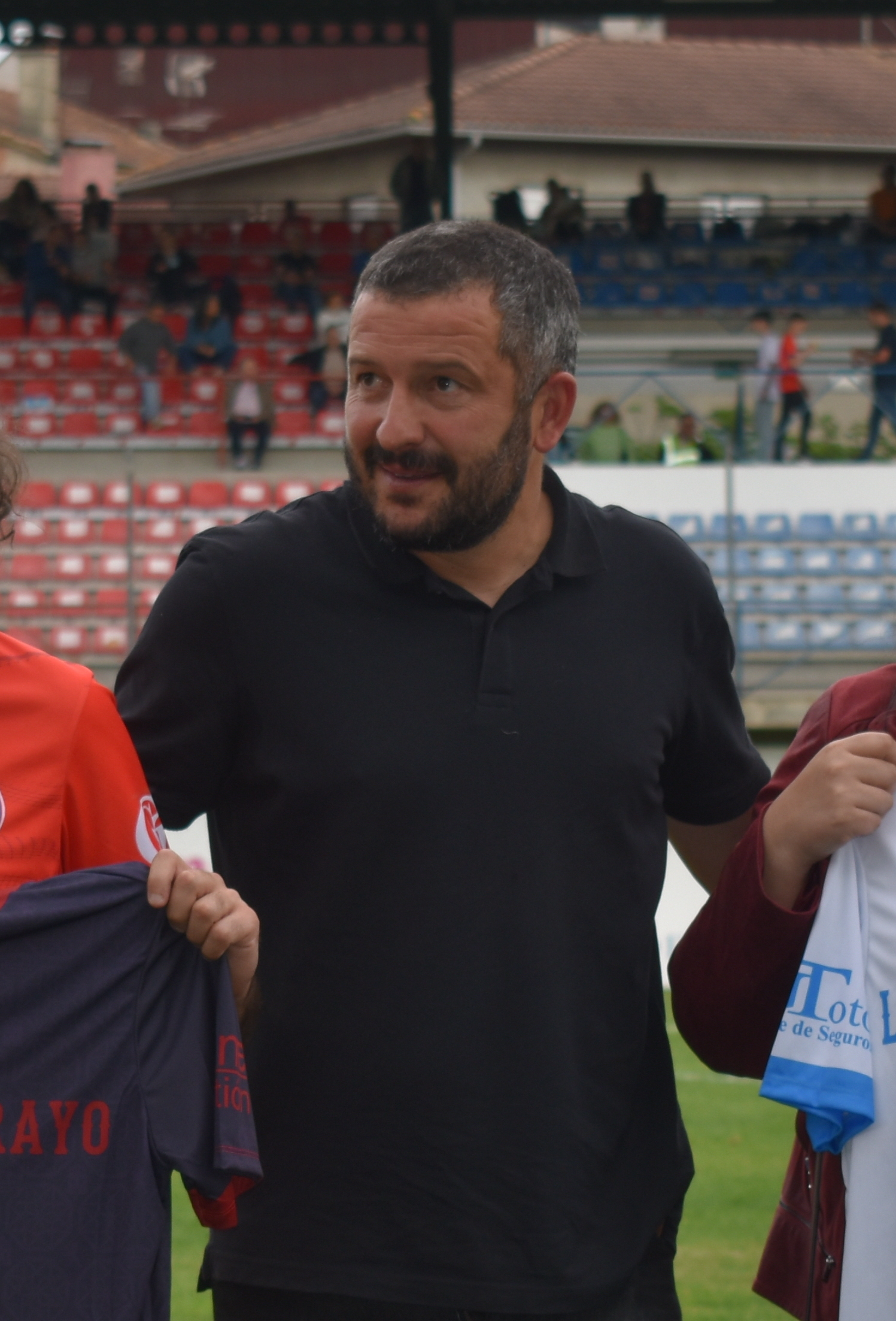
- Currás in 2022

Personal information
- Full name: Fernando Currás Gallego
- Date of birth: 19 February 1977 (age 49)
- Place of birth: Ourense, Spain
- Height: 1.83 m (6 ft 0 in)
- Position: Midfielder

Youth career
- Ourense

Senior career*
Years	Team	Apps	(Gls)
1994–1997	Ourense B		
1996–1999	Ourense	77	(8)
1999–2000	Getafe	30	(1)
2000–2001	Gandía	15	(0)
2001–2002	Alcorcón	35	(3)
2002–2003	Jaén	35	(2)
2003–2007	Ourense	136	(8)
2007–2010	Melilla	82	(1)

Managerial career
- 2011–2014: Melilla (assistant)
- 2014–2016: Melilla
- * Club domestic league appearances and goals

Fernando Currás Gallego (born 19 February 1977) is a Spanish retired footballer who played as a midfielder, and most recently the manager of UD Melilla.

== Club career ==
Born in Ourense, Galicia, Currás graduated with CD Ourense's youth setup. He made his senior debuts with the reserves, playing several seasons in the regional leagues.

On 21 December 1996 Currás played his first professional match, starting in a 0–2 away loss against SD Eibar in the Segunda División championship. He was definitely promoted to the main squad in June of the following year, playing regularly afterwards.

In the 1999 summer Currás joined Getafe CF, also in the second level. He left the club in the following year and subsequently resumed his career in Segunda División B, representing CF Gandía, AD Alcorcón, Real Jaén, CD Ourense and UD Melilla; he retired with the latter in 2010, aged 32.

== Manager career ==
On 9 February 2011 Currás was appointed Andrés García Tébar's assistant at his last professional club, Mellilla. On 11 May 2014 he was appointed as manager, replacing Juan Moya.
