= CD Ourense =

Association football team in Spain

Ourense
- Full name: Club Deportivo; Ourense, S.A.D.
- Founded: 1952
- Dissolved: 2014
- Ground: O Couto, Ourense, Galicia, Spain
- Capacity: 5,625
Home colours	Away colours

Club Deportivo Ourense, S.A.D. was a Spanish football team based in Ourense, in the autonomous community of Galicia. Founded in 1952 after the dissolution of UD Orensana, it played in Segunda División B – Group 1, holding home games at Estadio de O Couto, which has a capacity of 5,625 spectators.

In 1967–68, the team completed an entire regular league season without drawing or losing a single game. Ourense won 30 out of 30 league games, but lost out to Elche CF Ilicitano in the promotion play-offs.

The club was dissolved on 15 July 2014.

== Season to season ==
Season	Tier	Division	Place	Copa del Rey
1952–53	4	Serie A	2nd	
1953–54	3	3ª	15th	
1954–55	3	3ª	4th	
1955–56	3	3ª	1st	
1956–57	3	3ª	1st	
1957–58	3	3ª	2nd	
1958–59	3	3ª	1st	
1959–60	2	2ª	3rd	Round of 16
1960–61	2	2ª	4th	Round of 32
1961–62	2	2ª	3rd	Round of 32
1962–63	2	2ª	7th	First round
1963–64	2	2ª	8th	Round of 32
1964–65	2	2ª	15th	First round
1965–66	3	3ª	2nd	
1966–67	3	3ª	1st	
1967–68	3	3ª	1st	
1968–69	3	3ª	1st	
1969–70	2	2ª	20th	Fourth round
1970–71	3	3ª	2nd	Third round
1971–72	3	3ª	3rd	Third round

Season	Tier	Division	Place	Copa del Rey
1972–73	3	3ª	1st	Round of 16
1973–74	2	2ª	12th	Third round
1974–75	2	2ª	18th	Round of 16
1975–76	3	3ª	5th	Second round
1976–77	3	3ª	2nd	Second round
1977–78	3	2ª B	3rd	First round
1978–79	3	2ª B	8th	Second round
1979–80	3	2ª B	19th	Second round
1980–81	4	3ª	5th	
1981–82	4	3ª	2nd	First round
1982–83	4	3ª	3rd	First round
1983–84	4	3ª	2nd	Second round
1984–85	4	3ª	2nd	Second round
1985–86	3	2ª B	6th	Second round
1986–87	3	2ª B	13th	Third round
1987–88	3	2ª B	3rd	Fourth round
1988–89	3	2ª B	3rd	Second round
1989–90	3	2ª B	13th	
1990–91	3	2ª B	7th	First round
1991–92	3	2ª B	5th	Third round

Season	Tier	Division	Place	Copa del Rey
1992–93	3	2ª B	5th	Fourth round
1993–94	3	2ª B	3rd	Second round
1994–95	2	2ª	20th	Second round
1995–96	3	2ª B	3rd	First round
1996–97	2	2ª	15th	First round
1997–98	2	2ª	16th	Second round
1998–99	2	2ª	22nd	Second round
1999–00	3	2ª B	2nd	Round of 16
2000–01	3	2ª B	2nd	Second round
2001–02	3	2ª B	11th	Second round
2002–03	3	2ª B	9th	

Season	Tier	Division	Place	Copa del Rey
2003–04	3	2ª B	4th	
2004–05	3	2ª B	9th	First round
2005–06	3	2ª B	14th	Second round
2006–07	3	2ª B	15th	
2007–08	3	2ª B	17th	
2008–09	4	3ª	3rd	
2009–10	4	3ª	3rd	
2010–11	4	3ª	3rd	
2011–12	4	3ª	1st	
2012–13	3	2ª B	12th	Second round
2013–14	3	2ª B	8th	

- 13 seasons in Segunda División
- 24 seasons in Segunda División B
- 24 seasons in Tercera División

== Last squad ==
Note: Flags indicate national team as defined under FIFA eligibility rules; some limited exceptions apply. Players may hold more than one non-FIFA nationality.

No.	Pos.	Nation	Player
—	GK	URU	Pato Guillén
—	GK	ESP	Manu Táboas
—	GK	ESP	Aarón
—	DF	ESP	Capi
—	DF	ESP	Alberto Campillo
—	DF	PAN	Jesús Iván Cerdeira
—	DF	ESP	Josu
—	DF	ESP	Daniel Portela
—	DF	ESP	Moisés García
—	DF	ESP	Daniel Pinillos
—	MF	ESP	Juan Martínez

No.	Pos.	Nation	Player
—	MF	ESP	Álex Fernández
—	MF	ESP	Iker Alegre
—	MF	ESP	Jaime Noguerol
—	MF	ESP	Javi Hernández
—	MF	ESP	Borja Yebra
—	MF	ESP	Rubén Arce
—	MF	MAR	Adil
—	MF	ESP	Toni
—	FW	ESP	Gustavo Souto
—	FW	ESP	Óscar Martínez
—	FW	ESP	Borja Valle

== Honours ==
- Tercera División: 1955–56, 1956–57, 1958–59, 1966–67, 1967–68, 1968–69, 1972–73, 2011–12
- Copa Federación: 2007–08, 2013–14

== Famous players ==
Note: this list includes players that have appeared in at least 100 league games and/or have reached international status.

- (Argentina) Blas Giunta
- (Brazil) Amilton
- (Croatia) Ivica Mornar
- (England) Mark Robins
- (Honduras) Jona
- (Montenegro) Dejan Batrović
- (Morocco) Nacer Abdellah
- (Nigeria) Augustine Eguavoen
- (Serbia) Ivan Đurđević
- (Spain) Aloisio
- (Spain) Borja Valle
- (Spain) David Ferreiro
- (Spain) Fernando Currás
- (Spain) Gaizka Garitano
- (Spain) Quique Estebaranz
- (Spain) Miguel Ángel
- (Spain) José Juan
- (Spain) José Luis Veloso
- (Venezuela) Jonay Hernández
