= CD Abarán =

Spanish football club

Abarán
- Full name: Club Deportivo Abarán
- Founded: 1948
- Dissolved: 1967
- Ground: Las Colonias, Abarán, Murcia, Spain
- Capacity: 2,500
Home colours

Club Deportivo Abarán was a Spanish football club based in Abarán, in the Region of Murcia. Created in 1948, the club first reached the Segunda División in 1963, playing two seasons but being dissolved only four years later.

== Season to season ==
| Season | Tier | Division | Place | Copa del Rey |
|---|---|---|---|---|
| 1948–1951 | — | Regional | — | |
| 1951–52 | DNP | | | |
| 1952–53 | 5 | 2ª Reg. | 4th | |
| 1953–1956 | DNP | | | |
| 1956–57 | 5 | 2ª Reg. | 3rd | |
| 1957–58 | 5 | 2ª Reg. | 1st | |
| 1958–59 | 4 | 1ª Reg. | 8th | |
| 1959–60 | 4 | 1ª Reg. | 1st | |

| Season | Tier | Division | Place | Copa del Rey |
|---|---|---|---|---|
| 1960–61 | 3 | 3ª | 8th | |
| 1961–62 | 3 | 3ª | 4th | |
| 1962–63 | 3 | 3ª | 1st | |
| 1963–64 | 2 | 2ª | 13th | First round |
| 1964–65 | 2 | 2ª | 16th | First round |
| 1965–66 | 3 | 3ª | 15th | |
| 1966–67 | 4 | 1ª Reg. | 13th | |

- 2 seasons in Segunda División
- 4 seasons in Tercera División
