= Nico Baleani =

Spanish footballer

Personal information
- Full name: Nicolás Baleani Springolo Serra
- Date of birth: 16 November 1992 (age 33)
- Place of birth: Palma, Spain
- Height: 1.76 m (5 ft 9 1/2 in)
- Position: Midfielder

Team information
- Current team: Constància

Youth career
- Mallorca

Senior career*
Years	Team	Apps	(Gls)
2011–2013	Mallorca B	71	(4)
2013	Mallorca	0	(0)
2014	La Roda	12	(0)
2014–2015	Mallorca B	29	(1)
2015–2017	Llosetense	67	(5)
2017–2019	Leioa	33	(2)
2019	→ Constància (loan)	4	(0)
2020–	Constància	15	(1)
- * Club domestic league appearances and goals as of 20 March 2021

Nicolás 'Nico' Baleani Springolo Serra (born 16 November 1992) is a Spanish footballer who plays as a midfielder for CE Constància.

== Football career ==
Born in Palma, Majorca, Balearic Islands, Baleani graduated with local giants RCD Mallorca's youth system, and made his senior debuts with the reserves in the 2010–11 campaign in Segunda División B. On 6 January 2013 he made his official debut with the first team, playing 24 minutes in a 2–1 away win against Sevilla FC for the season's Copa del Rey.

In the 2013 summer Baleani left Mallorca and moved to Czech Republic, but returned to Spain in the following transfer window, joining La Roda CF. On 12 July 2014 he returned to his former club Mallorca, being again assigned to the reserves.

On 18 January 2019, Baleani was loaned out from SD Leioa to CE Constància.
