= Capi (footballer, born 1981) =

Spanish footballer

Personal information
- Full name: Manuel Borja Calvar Simón
- Date of birth: 2 April 1981 (age 45)
- Place of birth: Vigo, Spain
- Height: 1.88 m (6 ft 2 in)
- Position: Centre-back

Youth career
- Celta

Senior career*
Years	Team	Apps	(Gls)
2000–2002	Celta B		
2002–2003	Ponte Ourense		
2003–2005	Zaragoza B	52	(0)
2004–2006	Zaragoza	13	(1)
2006–2009	Murcia	1	(0)
2007	→ Lorca Deportiva (loan)	5	(1)
2007–2008	→ Las Palmas (loan)	7	(0)
2008–2009	→ Ciudad Santiago (loan)	32	(2)
2009–2012	Montañeros	65	(4)
2012–2014	Ourense	48	(2)
2014–2017	Pontevedra	57	(4)
2017–2020	Céltiga	70	(5)
Total		350+	(19+)
- * Club domestic league appearances and goals

Manuel Borja Calvar Simón (born 2 April 1981), known as Capi, is a Spanish former professional footballer who played as a central defender.

== Club career ==
Born in Vigo, Galicia, Capi graduated from RC Celta de Vigo's youth system, making his senior debut with the reserves in the 2000–01 season in the Tercera División. Two years later, he joined neighbouring Ponte Ourense CF also in the fourth tier.

In the summer of 2003, Capi signed for Real Zaragoza, being initially assigned to the B side in the Segunda División B. On 25 April 2004 he made his first-team and La Liga debut, coming on as a substitute in a 4–4 home draw against Sevilla FC. He scored his first professional goal the following 6 March, in the 1–0 home victory over Racing de Santander.

Capi joined Segunda División club Real Murcia CF in 2006. However, after appearing only once in the first part of the campaign, he moved to Lorca Deportiva CF on loan, signing with UD Las Palmas six months later also on loan. After a third loan stint, with SD Ciudad de Santiago, he was released in August 2009.

In the following years, Capi competed mainly in the third division but also in the fourth, representing Montañeros CF, CD Ourense and Pontevedra CF.
