= Marquitos (footballer, born 1938) =

Spanish footballer (1938–2019)

Marquitos II
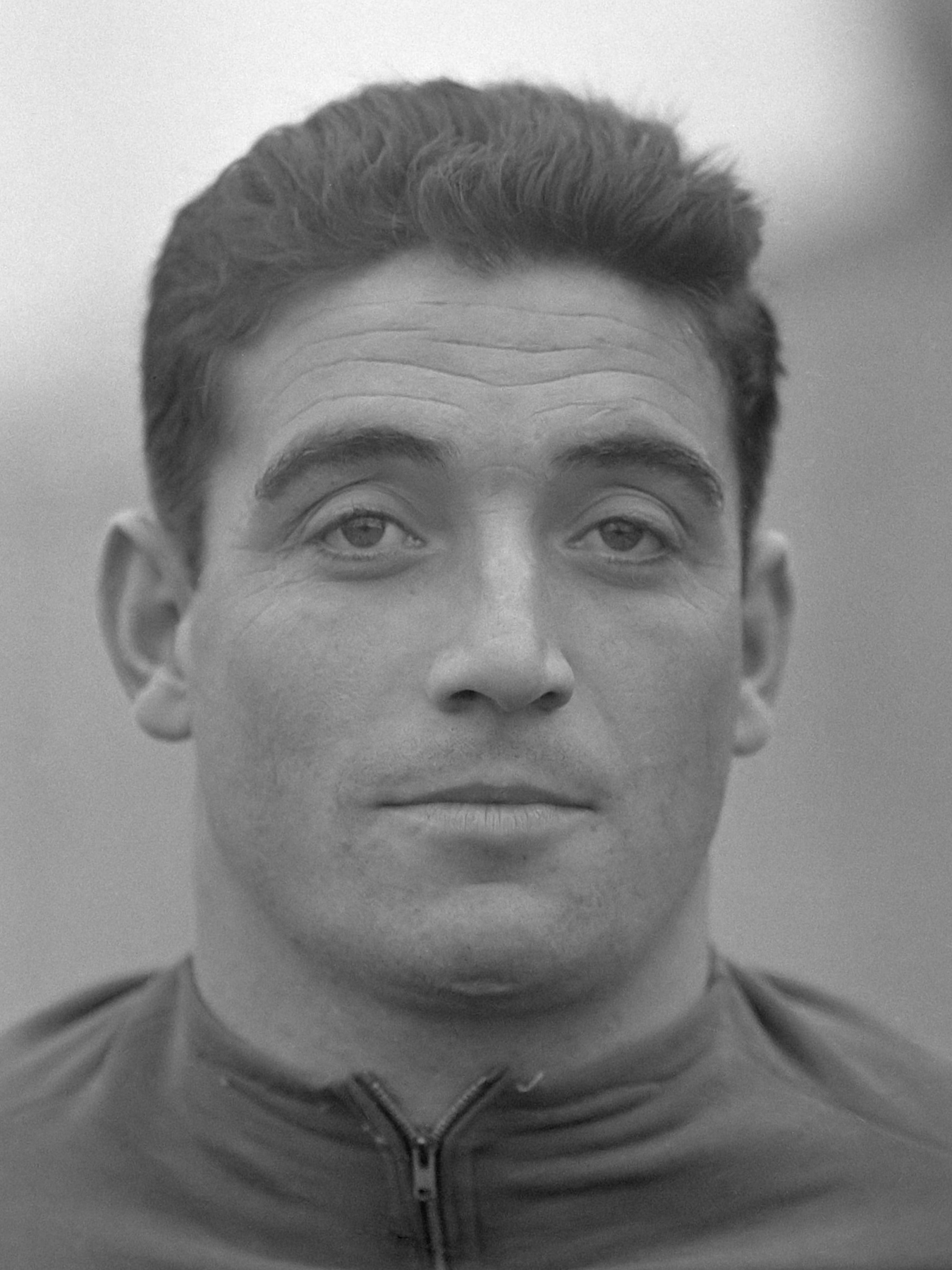
- Marquitos II in 1963

Personal information
- Full name: Antonio Alonso Imaz
- Date of birth: 6 July 1938
- Place of birth: Santander, Spain
- Date of death: 20 July 2019 (aged 81)
- Place of death: Santander, Spain
- Height: 1.82 m (6 ft 0 in)
- Position: Defender

Youth career
- Racing Santander

Senior career*
| Years | Team | Apps | (Gls) |
| 1958–1959 | Racing Santander | 0 | (0) |
| 1959–1960 | Plus Ultra | 10 | (0) |
| 1960–1961 | Cádiz | 26 | (0) |
| 1961–1962 | Plus Ultra | 19 | (0) |
| 1962–1963 | Abarán | | |
| 1963–1964 | Excelsior Rotterdam | 23 | (0) |
| 1964–1966 | Blauw-Wit Amsterdam | 29 | (1) |
- * Club domestic league appearances and goals

Antonio Alonso Imaz (6 July 1938 – 20 July 2019), nicknamed Marquitos II, was a Spanish footballer who played as a defender.

== Club career ==
Marquitos was born in Santander, Cantabria. He played for the Spanish clubs Plus Ultra, Cádiz and Abarán.

At the age 25, he moved to the Netherlands to join Excelsior Rotterdam in August 1963. In July 1964 moved to Blauw-Wit Amsterdam.

== Personal life and death ==
Marquitos' brothers Marcos Alonso Imaz, José Alonso Imaz and Alfredo Alonso Imaz were also footballers.

His nephew, Marcos Alonso Peña (1959–2023), was also a footballer and coach. He represented, with success, Atlético Madrid, FC Barcelona and Spain – amongst others.

Marquitos died on 20 July 2019.
