= David Porras =

Spanish footballer

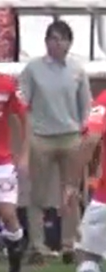
- Porras managing Alcoyano in 2013

Personal information
- Full name: David Porras Navarro
- Date of birth: 12 November 1973 (age 52)
- Place of birth: Alcoy, Spain
- Position: Midfielder

Youth career
- 1985–1992: Alcoyano

Senior career*
| Years | Team | Apps | (Gls) |
| 1992–1993 | Alcoyano B | | |
| 1992–1993 | Alcoyano | 3 | (0) |
| 1993 | → Bocairent (loan) | 6 | (2) |
| 1993–1997 | Ontinyent | | |
| 1997–1999 | Eldense | | |
| 1999–2000 | Dénia | | |
| 2000–2002 | Ontinyent | | |
| 2002–2004 | Alcoyano | | |

Managerial career
- 2004–2005: Albaidense
- 2008–2009: Alcoyano (youth)
- 2009–2011: Alcoyano (assistant)
- 2011–2012: Alcoyano
- 2013–2014: Alcoyano
- 2017: Ibiza
- * Club domestic league appearances and goals

David Porras Navarro (born 12 November 1973) is a Spanish retired footballer who played as a midfielder, and is a coach.

== Playing career ==
Born in Alcoy, Province of Alicante, Porras played his entire career in the lower leagues, never competing in higher than Segunda División B. He started at CD Alcoyano led by a young Juande Ramos, making his official debut on 6 September 1992 against Orihuela Deportiva CF.

In that level, Porras represented Alcoyano during that season – in which he alternated with the reserve team – and Ontinyent CF (1994–96), spending the rest of his career in Tercera División. After helping the former club promote to the third level in 2004, he retired at the age of 30.

== Coaching career ==
After a brief spell in amateur football, Porras returned to Alcoyano and started coaching its youth teams. In 2009, he was promoted to assistant coach in the main squad.

Late into the 2010–11 campaign, Porras replaced dismissed Paco López at the helm of the first team, going on to achieve promotion to Segunda División after 42 years of absence. On 19 March 2012, after a 0–3 away loss to Deportivo de La Coruña which placed the side in the relegation zone, he was himself fired.

Porras returned to the helm of his hometown club just over a year later, after the dismissal of Asier Garitano. He left at the end of the 2013–14 season, at his own accord, having missed the playoffs.

In March 2017, Porras was hired by UD Ibiza and given the task of promotion to the fourth tier. He achieved this, but was sacked after the first game of the new season, a 1–0 loss to CE Felanitx.

== Personal life ==
Porras' brothers, Francisco (1972, defender) and Sergio (1976, midfielder), were also footballers. Both played exclusively in the lower leagues.
