= Antón Quindimil =

Spanish footballer

Personal information
- Full name: Antón Quindimil Rodríguez
- Date of birth: 23 November 1999 (age 26)
- Place of birth: Abegondo, Spain
- Height: 1.87 m (6 ft 2 in)
- Position: Centre-back

Team information
- Current team: Melilla
- Number: 4

Youth career
- Racing Ferrol
- 2015–2018: Celta

Senior career*
Years	Team	Apps	(Gls)
2018–2019	Somozas	35	(3)
2019–2021	Polvorín	32	(1)
2020–2021	Lugo	1	(0)
2021–2022	Tenerife B	35	(3)
2022–2023	Bergantiños	27	(0)
2023–2024	Somozas	15	(1)
2024–2025	La Unión Atlético	42	(2)
2025–	Melilla	30	(1)
- * Club domestic league appearances and goals as of 16 May 2026

Antón Quindimil Rodríguez (born 23 November 1999) is a Spanish footballer who plays for Segunda Federación club Melilla as a centre-back.

== Club career ==
Born in Abegondo, A Coruña, Galicia, Quindimil joined RC Celta de Vigo's youth setup in 2015, from Racing de Ferrol. On 21 July 2018, after finishing his formation, he moved to Tercera División side UD Somozas.

Quindimil made his senior debut on 26 August 2018, starting and scoring the opener in a 4–0 home routing of former side Racing Ferrol. In July of the following year, after contributing with three goals in 35 matches, he moved to CD Lugo and was assigned to the farm team also in the fourth division. Quindimil made his first team debut on 13 September 2020, coming on as a second-half substitute for Borja Domínguez in a 0–2 away loss against CF Fuenlabrada.

In July 2021, Quindimil signed for Tercera Federación side CD Tenerife B. A year later, in July 2022, he moved to Segunda Federación side Bergantiños FC.

Ahead of the 2023–24 season, Quindimil joined Tercera Federación side UD Somozas. Seven months later, at the end of January 2024, he joined Segunda Federación side FC La Unión Atlético.
