= Melilla CF =

Melilla
- Full name: Melilla Club de Fútbol
- Founded: 1946
- Dissolved: 1976
- Ground: Estadio Municipal Álvarez Claro
- Capacity: 8,000
Home colours

Melilla Club de Fútbol was a Spanish football team based in the autonomous city of Melilla. Founded in 1946 as Club Deportivo Tesorillo and dissolved in 1976, it played for four consecutive seasons in Segunda División.

== History ==
Founded in 1946 as Club Deportivo Tesorillo, the club was renamed Melilla Club de Fútbol in August 1956, after the dissolution of UD Melilla. Having won promotion to Tercera División in that year, they played for six consecutive seasons in the category, achieving an impressive first place in their debut season.

The club reached Segunda División in 1962, and played for four consecutive seasons in the category before suffering relegation. They went on to play in the third division until 1976, and after suffering relegation, they merged with Club Gimnástico de Cabrerizas, which had won promotion to the third level, to create Gimnástico Melilla Club de Fútbol.

=== Club background ===
- Juventud Español — (1940–43)
- Melilla Fútbol Club — (1921–43)
- Unión Deportiva Melilla — (1943–56)
- Club Deportivo Tesorillo — (1940–56)
- Melilla Club de Fútbol – (1956–76)
- Club Gimnástico de Cabrerizas – (1973–76)
- Sociedad Deportiva Melilla – (1970–76)
- Gimnástico Melilla Club de Fútbol – (1976–80)
- Unión Deportiva Melilla – (1980–)

==== Other clubs from Melilla ====
- Club Deportivo Real Melilla — (1939–)
- Club de Fútbol Melilla Industrial – (1968–74)
- Club de Fútbol Industrial Melilla – (1975–85)
- Melilla Fútbol Club — (1985–91)

== Season to season ==
Season	Tier	Division	Place	Copa del Rey
1940–1956	—	Regional	—	
1956–57	3	3ª	1st	
1957–58	3	3ª	14th	
1958–59	3	3ª	13th	
1959–60	3	3ª	9rh	
1960–61	3	3ª	2nd	
1961–62	3	3ª	2nd	
1962–63	2	2ª	11th	First round
1963–64	2	2ª	12th	Round of 32
1964–65	2	2ª	12th	First round
1965–66	2	2ª	15th	First round

Season	Tier	Division	Place	Copa del Rey
1966–67	3	3ª	6th	
1967–68	3	3ª	4th	
1968–69	3	3ª	2nd	
1969–70	3	3ª	3rd	Fourth round
1970–71	3	3ª	11th	First round
1971–72	3	3ª	5th	First round
1972–73	3	3ª	7th	First round
1973–74	3	3ª	14th	Second round
1974–75	3	3ª	15th	First round
1975–76	3	3ª	18th	First round

- 4 seasons in Segunda División
- 16 seasons in Tercera División
