= Álex Cacho =

Spanish footballer

Personal information
- Full name: Alejandro Cacho Hernández
- Date of birth: 3 September 1987 (age 39)
- Place of birth: Ágreda, Spain
- Height: 1.85 m (6 ft 1 in)
- Position: Right back

Team information
- Current team: Cirbonero

Youth career
- Numancia

Senior career*
| Years | Team | Apps | (Gls) |
| 2006–2008 | Numancia B | | |
| 2008–2010 | Ontinyent | 72 | (0) |
| 2010–2011 | Sant Andreu | 35 | (1) |
| 2011–2012 | Ontinyent | 35 | (3) |
| 2012–2013 | Lleida Esportiu | 37 | (1) |
| 2013–2014 | Cartagena | 13 | (0) |
| 2014 | Huracán Valencia | 9 | (0) |
| 2014–2015 | Sestao | 17 | (0) |
| 2015–2018 | Izarra | 100 | (1) |
| 2018– | Cirbonero | | |
- * Club domestic league appearances and goals as of 27 May 2018

Alejandro 'Álex' Cacho Hernández (born 3 September 1987) is a Spanish footballer who plays for CA Cirbonero as a right back.

== Club career ==
Born in Ágreda, Province of Soria, Cacho graduated from local CD Numancia's youth system, making his senior debuts with the reserves in the 2006–07 season, in Tercera División. On 5 September 2007 he made his professional debut, starting in a 0–2 away loss against Hércules CF, for the season's Copa del Rey.

In the 2008 summer Cacho left Numancia, and competed in Segunda División B in the following seasons, representing Ontinyent CF (two stints), UE Sant Andreu, Lleida Esportiu, FC Cartagena, Sestao River and CD Izarra.
