= SD Melilla =

- Full name: Sociedad Deportiva Melilla
- Founded: 1970
- Dissolved: 1976
- Ground: Estadio Municipal Álvarez Claro
- Capacity: 8,000

Sociedad Deportiva Melilla was a Spanish football team based in the autonomous city of Melilla. Founded in 1970 and dissolved in 1976, it played for two consecutive seasons in Tercera División.

== History ==
Founded in 1970, the club won promotion to Tercera División in 1974 after defeating Ceuta-based side SDU África Ceutí in the promotion play-offs. After two seasons in the third tier, the club was involved into a fusion with newly-formed side Gimnástico Melilla CF, but the move never materialize, and SD Melilla's main players moved to the latter club instead. Having no time to form a squad to play in the third division, the SD resign from their place in the category on 25 August 1976, becoming diluted inside Gimnástico's structure afterwards.

=== Club background ===
- Juventud Español — (1940–43)
- Melilla Fútbol Club — (1921–43)
- Unión Deportiva Melilla — (1943–56)
- Club Deportivo Tesorillo — (1940–56)
- Melilla Club de Fútbol – (1956–76)
- Club Gimnástico de Cabrerizas – (1973–76)
- Sociedad Deportiva Melilla – (1970–76)
- Gimnástico Melilla Club de Fútbol – (1976–80)
- Unión Deportiva Melilla – (1980–)

==== Other clubs from Melilla ====
- Club Deportivo Real Melilla — (1939–)
- Club de Fútbol Melilla Industrial – (1968–74)
- Club de Fútbol Industrial Melilla – (1975–85)
- Melilla Fútbol Club — (1985–91)

== Season to season ==
Season	Tier	Division	Place	Copa del Rey
1970–71	4	1ª Reg.	5th	
1971–72	4	1ª Reg.	1st	
1972–73	4	1ª Reg.	2nd	
1973–74	4	1ª Reg.	1st	
1974–75	3	3ª	10th	Second round
1975–76	3	3ª	16th	Second round

- 2 seasons in Tercera División
