= UD Melilla (1943) =

Melilla
- Full name: Unión Deportiva Melilla
- Founded: 6 February 1943
- Dissolved: 1956
- Ground: Estadio Municipal Álvarez Claro
- Capacity: 8,000
Home colours

Unión Deportiva Melilla was a Spanish football team based in the autonomous city of Melilla. Founded in 1943 and dissolved in 1956, it played for four consecutive seasons in Segunda División.

== History ==
At the beginning of the 1930s, Melilla city had four local football teams: Melilla C.F., Sociedad Deportiva Melillense, Deportivo Español and La Hípica. Unión Deportiva Melilla was founded on 6 February 1943. The first official game was against C.D. African on 21 March 1943. UD Melilla won it 5:1.

The club reached Tercera División after only one year of existence, and in 1950, achieved promotion to Segunda División. They suffered relegation in 1954, and folded two years later. Melilla CF took their place.

=== Club background ===
- Juventud Español — (1940–43)
- Melilla Fútbol Club — (1921–43)
- Unión Deportiva Melilla — (1943–56)
- Club Deportivo Tesorillo — (1940–56)
- Melilla Club de Fútbol – (1956–76)
- Club Gimnástico de Cabrerizas – (1973–76)
- Sociedad Deportiva Melilla – (1970–76)
- Gimnástico Melilla Club de Fútbol – (1976–80)
- Unión Deportiva Melilla – (1980–)

==== Other clubs from Melilla ====
- Club Deportivo Real Melilla — (1939–)
- Club de Fútbol Melilla Industrial – (1968–74)
- Club de Fútbol Industrial Melilla – (1975–85)
- Melilla Fútbol Club — (1985–91)

== Honours ==
- North Africa Championship:
  - Winners (1): 1943–44
  - Runners-up (2): 1954–55, 1955–56

== Season to season ==
Season	Tier	Division	Place	Copa del Rey
1943–44	4	1ª Reg.		Third round
1944–45	3	3ª	5th	
1945–46	3	3ª	3rd	
1946–47	3	3ª	1st	
1947–48	3	3ª	1st	Second round
1948–49	3	3ª	12th	Third round
1949–50	3	3ª	2nd	

Season	Tier	Division	Place	Copa del Rey
1950–51	2	2ª	10th	
1951–52	2	2ª	8th	
1952–53	2	2ª	5th	Second round
1953–54	2	2ª	13th	
1954–55	3	3ª	2nd	
1955–56	3	3ª	2nd	

- 4 seasons in Segunda División
- 8 seasons in Tercera División
