= Ontinyent CF =

Coordinates: 38.825574°N 0.591213°W

Ontinyent
- Full name: Ontinyent Club de Fútbol
- Founded: 1947
- Dissolved: 28 March 2019
- Ground: El Clariano, Ontinyent, Valencia, Spain
- Capacity: 5,000
- 2018–19: 2ª B – Group 3, withdrew
- Website: http://www.ontinyentcf.es
Home colours	Away colours

Ontinyent Club de Fútbol was a Spanish football team based in Ontinyent, in the autonomous community of Valencia. Founded in 1947 it held home games at Estadio El Clariano, with a capacity of 5,000 seats.

On 28 March 2019, due to economic problems, the club resigned from the Segunda División B and announced it would cease its activity.

== Season to season ==
Season	Tier	Division	Place	Copa del Rey
1947–48	5	2ª Reg.		
1948–49	5	2ª Reg.	1st	
1949–50	5	2ª Reg.	1st	
1950–51	4	1ª Reg.	10th	
1951–52	4	1ª Reg.	2nd	
1952–53	4	1ª Reg.	8th	
1953–54	3	3ª	7th	
1954–55	4	1ª Reg.	1st	
1955–56	3	3ª	8th	
1956–57	3	3ª	7th	
1957–58	3	3ª	11th	
1958–59	3	3ª	7th	
1959–60	3	3ª	4th	
1960–61	3	3ª	2nd	
1961–62	3	3ª	7th	
1962–63	3	3ª	1st	
1963–64	2	2ª	10th	Round of 32
1964–65	2	2ª	15th	Round of 32
1965–66	3	3ª	2nd	
1966–67	3	3ª	2nd	

Season	Tier	Division	Place	Copa del Rey
1967–68	3	3ª	1st	
1968–69	2	2ª	15th	
1969–70	2	2ª	9th	Round of 32
1970–71	2	2ª	18th	Fourth round
1971–72	3	3ª	7th	First round
1972–73	3	3ª	8th	First round
1973–74	3	3ª	7th	First round
1974–75	3	3ª	9th	First round
1975–76	3	3ª	11th	First round
1976–77	3	3ª	10th	First round
1977–78	3	2ª B	17th	Third round
1978–79	3	2ª B	10th	First round
1979–80	3	2ª B	20th	First round
1980–81	4	3ª	11th	
1981–82	4	3ª	5th	
1982–83	4	3ª	9th	First round
1983–84	4	3ª	8th	
1984–85	4	3ª	16th	
1985–86	4	3ª	7th	
1986–87	4	3ª	15th	Second round

Season	Tier	Division	Place	Copa del Rey
1987–88	4	3ª	6th	
1988–89	4	3ª	4th	
1989–90	4	3ª	2nd	
1990–91	4	3ª	4th	First round
1991–92	4	3ª	3rd	
1992–93	4	3ª	6th	First round
1993–94	4	3ª	2nd	
1994–95	3	2ª B	10th	Third round
1995–96	3	2ª B	18th	
1996–97	4	3ª	2nd	
1997–98	3	2ª B	13th	First round
1998–99	3	2ª B	14th	
1999–2000	3	2ª B	19th	
2000–01	4	3ª	16th	
2001–02	4	3ª	11th	
2002–03	4	3ª	13th	

Season	Tier	Division	Place	Copa del Rey
2003–04	4	3ª	6th	
2004–05	4	3ª	12th	
2005–06	4	3ª	6th	
2006–07	4	3ª	4th	
2007–08	3	2ª B	6th	
2008–09	3	2ª B	7th	
2009–10	3	2ª B	3rd	Third round
2010–11	3	2ª B	11th	First round
2011–12	3	2ª B	14th	
2012–13	3	2ª B	15th	
2013–14	3	2ª B	20th	
2014–15	4	3ª	5th	
2015–16	4	3ª	2nd	
2016–17	4	3ª	3rd	
2017–18	3	2ª B	5th	
2018–19	3	2ª B	Ret.	Third round

- 5 seasons in Segunda División
- 17 seasons in Segunda División B
- 43 seasons in Tercera División

== Notable former players ==
Note: this list includes players that have played at least 100 league games and/or have reached international status.

- (Guinea) Keita Karamokoba
- (Mexico) Omar Arellano
- (Panama) Alberto Quintero
- (Paraguay) José Aveiro
- (Spain) Gonzalo Bonastre
- (Spain) Álex Cacho
- (Spain) Álvaro Cervera
- (Spain) Marañón
- (Spain) Àlex Pascual
- (Spain) David Porras
- (Spain) David Rangel
- (Spain) Julián Rubio
- (Spain) César Soriano

== See also ==
- Ontinyent 1931 CF, Ontinyent's phoenix club
