= Gonzalo Bonastre =

Spanish footballer

Gonzalo
Personal information
- Full name: Gonzalo Bonastre Fuster
- Date of birth: 3 March 1981 (age 45)
- Place of birth: Alicante, Spain
- Height: 1.80 m (5 ft 11 in)
- Position: Centre-back

Youth career
- Hércules

Senior career*
Years	Team	Apps	(Gls)
2000–2003	Hércules B		
1999–2003	Hércules	18	(0)
2001–2002	→ Torrellano (loan)		
2003	→ Figueres (loan)	13	(0)
2003–2004	Figueres	14	(0)
2004–2005	Alcalá	34	(1)
2005–2006	Algeciras	9	(0)
2006–2007	Alcalá	39	(3)
2007–2012	Ontinyent	141	(6)
2012–2013	Yeclano	30	(0)
2013–2014	Alicante	32	(4)
2014–2015	Almoradí	27	(1)
2016–2017	CFI Alicante	2	(0)
2019–2020	Benidorm CD	19	(0)
- * Club domestic league appearances and goals

Gonzalo Bonastre Fuster (born 3 March 1981) is a Spanish former footballer who played as a central defender.

== Club career ==
Player made in the house of Hércules CF. After playing in Spanish Second Division started a journey on the third level teams. Was consecrated as a player in the RSD Alcalá and Ontinyent CF where he was captain.
