= UD Melilla =

Melilla
- Full name: Unión Deportiva Melilla
- Founded: 29 June 1976; 50 years ago (as Gimnástico Melilla Club de Fútbol; re-founded)
- Stadium: Estadio Municipal Álvarez Claro
- Capacity: 8,000
- President: Luis Manuel Rincón
- Head coach: Miguel Riveira Mora
- League: Tercera Federación – Group 9
- 2025–26: Segunda Federación – Group 4, 16th of 18 (relegated)
- Website: udmelilla.es
Home colours	Away colours	Third colours

Unión Deportiva Melilla is a Spanish football team based in the autonomous city of Melilla. Founded in 1976, it currently plays in Tercera Federación – Group 9, holding home matches at Estadio Municipal Álvarez Claro, with an 8,000 capacity venue.

== History ==
Founded in 1976 as Gimnástico Melilla Club de Fútbol after a merger of Melilla CF and Club Gimnástico de Cabrerizas, the club immediately took Cabrerizas' place in Tercera División. Renamed Unión Deportiva Melilla (as an honour to the club founded in the 1940s) in 1980, it reached Segunda División B in 1987.

Melilla reached the last 32 of the Copa del Rey in 2012–13 where they were eliminated 4–2 on aggregate by La Liga side Levante UD, having won the first leg 1–0 at home via a Fernando Velasco penalty. Six years later, at the same stage, the team were beaten 10–1 on aggregate by Real Madrid.

Melilla's 34-year run in the third tier ended following the 2020–21 Segunda División B, when the team were put in the new fourth-level Segunda Federación after a league restructuring. In April 2023, following two years at that level, the team won automatic promotion as champions.

=== Club background ===
- Juventud Español — (1940–43)
- Melilla Fútbol Club — (1921–43)
- Unión Deportiva Melilla — (1943–56)
- Club Deportivo Tesorillo — (1940–56)
- Melilla Club de Fútbol – (1956–76)
- Club Gimnástico de Cabrerizas – (1973–76)
- Sociedad Deportiva Melilla – (1970–76)
- Gimnástico Melilla Club de Fútbol – (1976–80)
- Unión Deportiva Melilla – (1980–)

==== Other clubs from Melilla ====
- Club Deportivo Real Melilla — (1939–)
- Club de Fútbol Melilla Industrial – (1968–74)
- Club de Fútbol Industrial Melilla – (1975–85)
- Melilla Fútbol Club — (1985–91)

== Rivalry ==
The Ceuta-Melilla derby was between Melilla and AD Ceuta, who were dissolved in 2012. The two clubs travelled to face each other via the Spanish mainland to avoid entering Morocco.

== Honours ==
- North Africa Championship:
  - Winners (1): 1943–44
  - Runners-up (2): 1954–55, 1955–56

== Season to season ==
Season	Tier	Division	Place	Copa del Rey
1976–77	3	3ª	16th	1st round
1977–78	4	3ª	4th	1st round
1978–79	4	3ª	2nd	1st round
1979–80	4	3ª	10th	1st round
1980–81	4	3ª	3rd	1st round
1981–82	4	3ª	8th	1st round
1982–83	4	3ª	4th	
1983–84	4	3ª	10th	1st round
1984–85	4	3ª	3rd	
1985–86	4	3ª	8th	1st round
1986–87	4	3ª	3rd	
1987–88	3	2ª B	7th	2nd round
1988–89	3	2ª B	15th	1st round
1989–90	3	2ª B	2nd	
1990–91	3	2ª B	6th	2nd round
1991–92	3	2ª B	14th	1st round
1992–93	3	2ª B	15th	3rd round
1993–94	3	2ª B	15th	2nd round
1994–95	3	2ª B	12th	1st round
1995–96	3	2ª B	12th	

Season	Tier	Division	Place	Copa del Rey
1996–97	3	2ª B	11th	
1997–98	3	2ª B	5th	
1998–99	3	2ª B	1st	
1999–2000	3	2ª B	9th	1st round
2000–01	3	2ª B	8th	
2001–02	3	2ª B	16th	
2002–03	3	2ª B	14th	
2003–04	3	2ª B	7th	
2004–05	3	2ª B	8th	First round
2005–06	3	2ª B	8th	
2006–07	3	2ª B	9th	
2007–08	3	2ª B	7th	
2008–09	3	2ª B	6th	Third round
2009–10	3	2ª B	2nd	Second round
2010–11	3	2ª B	3rd	Third round
2011–12	3	2ª B	5th	First round
2012–13	3	2ª B	9th	Round of 32
2013–14	3	2ª B	8th	
2014–15	3	2ª B	7th	
2015–16	3	2ª B	9th	First round

Season	Tier	Division	Place	Copa del Rey
2016–17	3	2ª B	6th	
2017–18	3	2ª B	5th	First round
2018–19	3	2ª B	3rd	Round of 32
2019–20	3	2ª B	13th	First round
2020–21	3	2ª B	7th / 1st	
2021–22	4	2ª RFEF	9th	
2022–23	4	2ª Fed.	1st	
2023–24	3	1ª Fed.	18th	Second round
2024–25	4	2ª Fed.	11th	
2025–26	4	2ª Fed.	16th	
2026–27	5	3ª Fed.		

- 1 season in Primera Federación
- 34 seasons in Segunda División B
- 4 seasons in Segunda Federación/Segunda División RFEF
- 11 seasons in Tercera División
- 1 season in Tercera Federación

== Current squad ==
As of 1 March 2026

Note: Flags indicate national team as defined under FIFA eligibility rules; some limited exceptions apply. Players may hold more than one non-FIFA nationality.

No.	Pos.	Nation	Player
1	GK	ESP	Samuel Franganillo
3	DF	ESP	Álex Muñiz
4	DF	ESP	Antón Quindimil
5	DF	ESP	Isma Armenteros
6	MF	ESP	Álex Ortolà
7	FW	ESP	Manu Viana
8	MF	ESP	Julio Iglesias
9	FW	ARG	Matías Chavarría
10	MF	ESP	Roberto Abreu
11	FW	ESP	Óscar Lorenzo
12	FW	ESP	Javi Sola
13	GK	ESP	Javi Olmedo
14	MF	ESP	Álex Claverías

No.	Pos.	Nation	Player
15	MF	ESP	Luis Morales
16	DF	ESP	Adrián Tovar
17	DF	ESP	Pelón Cabrera
19	FW	CIV	Jacques Dago
20	DF	ESP	Iván Robles
21	DF	SEN	Samu Gomis
22	DF	ESP	Juan Antonio Segura
23	DF	ESP	Lillo
24	MF	ESP	José Ángel Ayala
27	MF	ESP	Abdel Lah Mohamed
—	DF	ESP	Fran Varela
—	FW	ESP	Alvarito

== Notable managers ==
- Juan Ramón López Caro
- Juan Antonio Anquela

== Reserve team ==
Their reserve team, UD Melilla B, played for several years in Primera Autonómica Melilla and in Tercera División before ceasing activities in 2012. In 2013, Casino del Real CF became their reserve side, and was subsequently renamed to Melilla B in 2014.
