= CE Constància =

Spanish association football club

Constància
- Full name: Club Esportiu Constància
- Nicknames: Constanciers; Inquers; Blanc-i-negres
- Founded: 2 December 1922
- Ground: Nou Camp, Inca, Balearic Islands, Spain
- Capacity: 10,000
- President: Valeria Bouzada
- Head Coach: Guillem Llaneras
- League: Tercera Federación – Group 11
- 2025–26: Tercera Federación – Group 11, 4th of 18
Home colours	Away colours	Third colours

Club Esportiu Constància is a Spanish football team based in Inca, Mallorca, in the autonomous community of the Balearic Islands. Founded in 1922, its first men's team currently plays in the Tercera Federación – Group 11, the fifth division. Its first women's team is active in the Primera Autonómica, the fourth tier, and its first u-19 team is active in the División de Honor, the highest category. Moreover, Constància has dozens of teams in its youth academy.

Constància has played 11 seasons in the Segunda División during the 20th century, becoming the second-most successful football club in the history of the Balearic Islands. Moreover, the club has played over 60 seasons in the Tercera División, being the Balearic team with the most seasons in this competition.

Its home matches are played at the Nou Camp d'Inca, in the city of Inca, the club's stadium since its inauguration in 1964. The stadium has a capacity of 10,000 seats, which makes it the second biggest stadium on the Balearic Islands.

== History ==
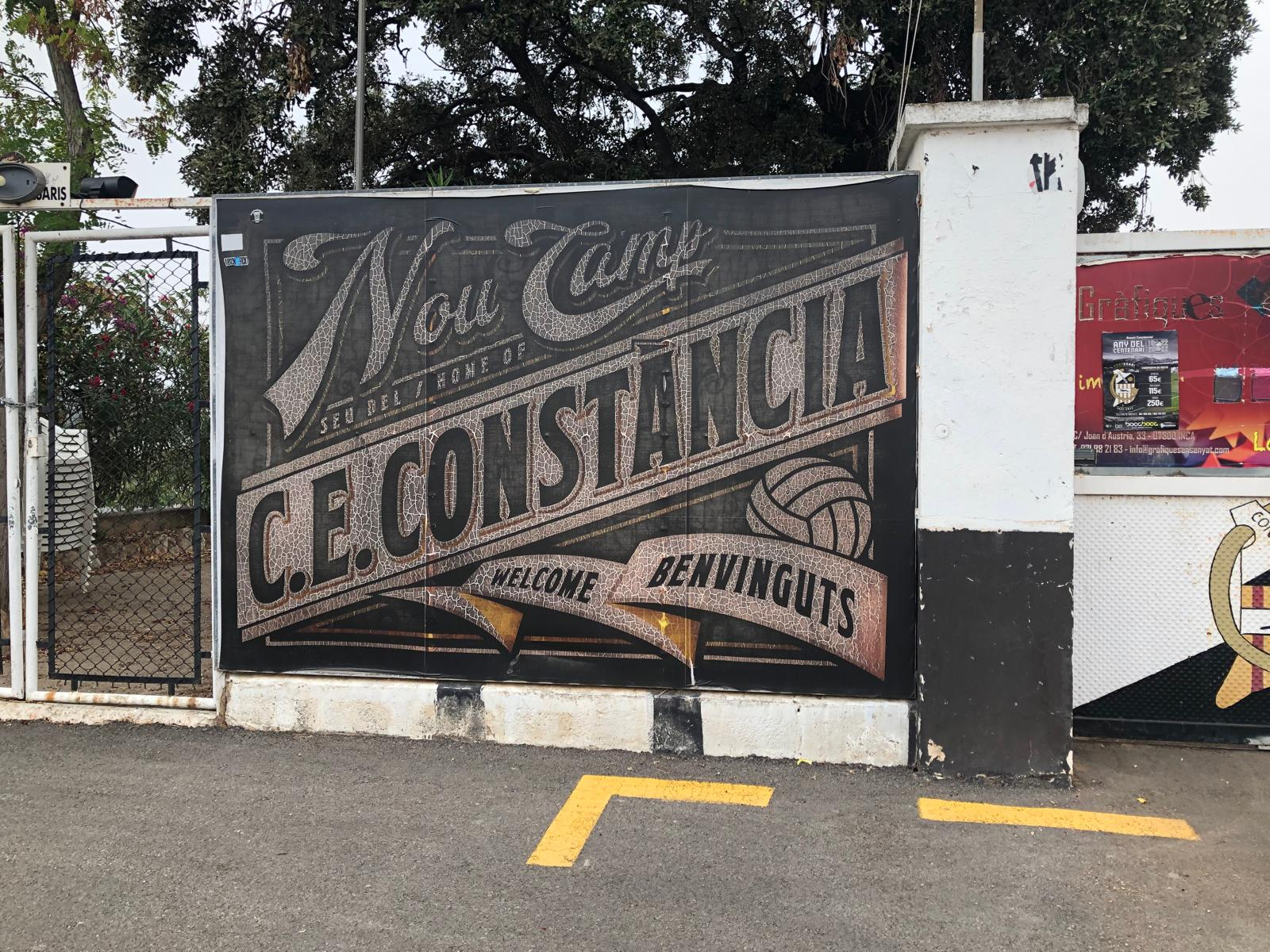
Entrance gate at the Nou Camp d'Inca

=== Name evolution ===
- Constancia Foot-ball Club (1922–1941)
- Club Deportivo Constancia (1941–2010)
- Club Esportiu Constància (2010–present)

=== Beginnings of football in Inca ===
The first football team in Inca was FC Inca (1910), the football section of the recreation organisation Centro Recreativo in the same city, but this stop ceased its activity a few months after its creation. Inca was left without a football club during many years, something that only changed in 1921 with the creation of FC Inquense, related to the same recreation organisation.

=== Foundation of CE Constància (1922) ===
Club Esportiu Constància was founded on 2 December 1922 as the football section of the provident society with the same name. Initially, there existed a rivalry between Constància and Inquense, but when the former outgrew the latter, Inquense was dissolved and many of its players joined Constància.

In 1924, Constància made its debut in the Mallorcan Championship, where the club obtained much influence in the footballing panorama of Mallorca. Meanwhile, Constància developed as a club with a working-class base, given that Inca used to be a town with a high number of factories. Moreover, the club became a symbol of football in the Part Forana (the parts of Mallorca outside of Palma), being the most potent football club outside of the capital.

=== The 1930s. Development, titles, and war ===
During the 1930s, Constància was already the main competitor of Alfons XIII (the current RCD Mallorca), which fueled their rivalry, accentuated by the socioeconomic and political differences between the supporters of Alfons XIII and Constància. In the same decade, Constància won the Mallorcan Championship on three consecutive occasions (1933, 1934, and 1935), while being crowned champion of the Balearic Islands on one occasion (1935).

The outbreak of the Spanish Civil War in 1936 had a significant influence on the club's development. According to recent investigations, Constància was one of the most retaliated football clubs in Spain, and four of its players were executed by the Francoist troops. During the war, the competities continued, and Constància won the Mallorcan Championship for the fourth time in 1939.

=== The 1940s. Promotion to the second tier and almost to the first one ===
After the end of the Civil War in 1939, the Spanish football competitions were restructured, and Constància was selected to play in the Segunda División because of its championship the season before. In 1939–40, the club was relegated, but returned for the 1941–42 season. Constància maintained the category for four consecutive seasons, of which 1943–44 stood out, as the club finished third and almost achieved promotion to La Liga. The following season, Constància played the final match of the regular season against CD Mallorca with both teams close to the relegation zone, and the match ended in favor of Mallorca after many controversial decisions by referee Agustí Cruellas, remembered in Inca for decades, after which Constància had to participate in the relegation play-off. The club lost and got relegated to the Tercera División.

=== The 1950s. Hitting rock bottom ===
After the relegation to the Tercera División in 1945, Constància was not able to return to the second tier quickly and even had to temporarily cease its activity after a severe institutional and economic crisis. The club was relegated to the regional categories, but recovered the third division some years later.

=== The 1960s. Last years in the Segunda División ===
After a strong season, Constància achieved promotion to the Segunda División for the third time in 1962. Despite players more consecutive seasons in the second division than during the 1940s, the six seasons between 1962 and 1968 consisted of more disappointing classifications. The 1967–68 season would be the last one of the 11 seasons that Constància has played in the second tier. Another highlight of this decade, concretely on 29 August 1965, was the opening of the Nou Camp d'Inca stadium.

=== Rest of the 20th century. Going down and consolidation in the Tercera División ===
The 1968 relegation caused a new crisis at the club, which ended in another successive relegation, this time to the regional amateur competitions. Constància needed five years to go back up to the Tercera División, a competition that it has rarely escaped since.

Moreover, the rivalry between Constància and RCD Mallorca was lost after the 1960s because of the lack of direct confrontations and the geographical distance between Palma and Inca.

During the rest of the 20th century, Constància only played in the Tercera División, except for one season in the Segunda División B (1987–88) and two seasons in the Regional Preferente (1990–92).

=== 21st century. A new promotion and the centenary ===
The dynamics of the last decades of the 20th century did not change during the first decades of the 21st century. Constància has almost only played in the Tercera División (until 2021) and the replacing Tercera Federación (after 2021), except for two seasons in the Segunda División B (2012–13 and 2013–14), its last seasons outside of the current fifth tier of Spanish football.

In 2022, the year of the celebrations of the club's centenary, Constància was awarded the Medal of Honour and Gratitude of the Island of Mallorca by the Insular Council of Mallorca. Moreover, the club designed a commemorative crest and shirt for its centenary.

== Season to season ==
Season	Tier	Division	Place	Copa del Rey
1939–40	2	2ª	5th	
1940–41	3	3ª	1st	Second round
1941–42	2	2ª	4th	
1942–43	2	2ª	3rd	Round of 16
1943–44	2	2ª	3rd	Round of 32
1944–45	2	2ª	12th	First round
1945–46	3	3ª	2nd	
1946–47	3	3ª	5th	
1947–48	3	3ª	6th	First round
1948–49	3	3ª	7th	Second round
1949–50	3	3ª	15th	
1950–51	3	3ª	14th	
1951–52	DNP			
1952–53	4	1ª Reg.	1st	
1953–54	3	3ª	9th	
1954–55	3	3ª	2nd	
1955–56	3	3ª	8th	
1956–57	3	3ª	5th	
1957–58	3	3ª	3rd	
1958–59	3	3ª	2nd	

Season	Tier	Division	Place	Copa del Rey
1959–60	3	3ª	9th	
1960–61	3	3ª	2nd	
1961–62	3	3ª	1st	
1962–63	2	2ª	12th	First round
1963–64	2	2ª	10th	Round of 32
1964–65	2	2ª	13th	First round
1965–66	2	2ª	13th	First round
1966–67	2	2ª	14th	First round
1967–68	2	2ª	16th	First round
1968–69	3	3ª	17th	
1969–70	4	1ª Reg.	3rd	
1970–71	4	1ª Reg.	4th	
1971–72	4	1ª Reg.	1st	
1972–73	4	Reg. Pref.	9th	
1973–74	4	Reg. Pref.	2nd	
1974–75	3	3ª	3rd	Fourth round
1975–76	3	3ª	10th	
1976–77	3	3ª	15th	First round
1977–78	4	3ª	12th	First round
1978–79	4	3ª	11th	

Season	Tier	Division	Place	Copa del Rey
1979–80	4	3ª	4th	Second round
1980–81	4	3ª	2nd	
1981–82	4	3ª	2nd	First round
1982–83	4	3ª	1st	First round
1983–84	4	3ª	1st	Second round
1984–85	4	3ª	8th	
1985–86	4	3ª	5th	
1986–87	4	3ª	4th	First round
1987–88	3	2ª B	17th	Second round
1988–89	4	3ª	8th	First round
1989–90	4	3ª	17th	
1990–91	5	Reg. Pref.	7th	
1991–92	5	Reg. Pref.	3rd	
1992–93	4	3ª	15th	
1993–94	4	3ª	8th	
1994–95	4	3ª	11th	
1995–96	4	3ª	5th	
1996–97	4	3ª	1st	
1997–98	4	3ª	2nd	
1998–99	4	3ª	1st	

Season	Tier	Division	Place	Copa del Rey
1999–2000	4	3ª	2nd	
2000–01	4	3ª	5th	
2001–02	4	3ª	3rd	
2002–03	4	3ª	2nd	
2003–04	4	3ª	6th	
2004–05	4	3ª	1st	
2005–06	4	3ª	13th	First round
2006–07	4	3ª	15th	
2007–08	4	3ª	6th	
2008–09	4	3ª	10th	
2009–10	4	3ª	3rd	
2010–11	4	3ª	3rd	
2011–12	4	3ª	1st	
2012–13	3	2ª B	17th	Third round
2013–14	3	2ª B	19th	
2014–15	4	3ª	5th	
2015–16	4	3ª	4th	
2016–17	4	3ª	8th	
2017–18	4	3ª	8th	
2018–19	4	3ª	10th	

Season	Tier	Division	Place	Copa del Rey
2019–20	4	3ª	8th	
2020–21	4	3ª	3rd / 5th	
2021–22	5	3ª RFEF	7th	
2022–23	5	3ª Fed.	6th	
2023–24	5	3ª Fed.	7th	
2024–25	5	3ª Fed.	2nd	
2025–26	5	3ª Fed.	4th	First round
2026–27	5	3ª Fed.		

- 11 seasons in Segunda División
- 3 seasons in Segunda División B
- 59 seasons in Tercera División
- 6 seasons in Tercera Federación/Tercera División RFEF
- 9 seasons in Divisiones Regionales

== Honours ==
=== Statewide tournaments ===
- Tercera División (8): 1940–41, 1961–62, 1982–83, 1983–84, 1996–97, 1998–99, 2004–05, 2011–12
- Categorías Regionales: 1952–53, 1971–72

=== Regional tournaments ===
- Mallorcan Championship (4): 1932–33, 1933–34, 1934–35, 1938–39
- Balearic Championship (1): 1934–35

== List of presidents ==
During its history, Constància has had at least 35 different presidents.

President	Period	President	Period
Miguel Beltrán Planas	1922–25	Juan Amer Llobera	1969–73
Bartomeu Payeras Ferrer	1922–25	Jaume Moyer Martorell	1973–77
Lorenzo Marqués Ramis	1922–25	Andreu Pol Bonín	1977–79
Pere Siquier Martí	1939–42	Jordi Cerdà Borràs	1979–86
Bartomeu Fluxà Mut	1939–42	José García Cerdà	1986–90
Andrés Mateu Pericàs	1939–42	Manuel García Alba	1990–91
Rafel Ramis	1939–42	Àngel García Bonafè	1991–95
Luis Aguacil Montis	1939–42	Miquel Llompart Mora	1995–98
Miguel Guasp Ferrer	1939–42	Andreu Sacares Genestra	1998–99
Andreu Bestard Oliver	1952–55	Antonio Martorell Llompart	1999–2001
Pere Prast Janer	1955–56	Jorge Guirado Martínez	2001–11
Antoni Prats Balaguer	1956–57	Antonio Ramis Martínez	2011–14
Antoni Benàssar Rolando	1960–63	Gabriel Burguera Canals	2014–16
Antoni Ferrari Campaner	1963–66	Andreu Gili Biscaí	2016–17
Miquel Sastre Terrasa	1966–67	Rafel Palou Amer	2017–23
Mateu Pieras Balle	1967–68	Valeria Bouzada	2023–present
P. Siquier	1968–69		
A. Melis	1968–69		
T. Vaquer	1968–69		

== Stadium ==
The Nou Camp d'Inca was inaugurated on 29 August 1965 and has a capacity of 10,000 seats. It is the second-biggest football stadium of the Balearic Islands after the Estadi de Son Moix. The surface of the playing field is natural grass, and has a size of 105x67 meters.

Before, the club played in different stadiums. The first one was the Camp des Blanquer (1923–1929), and the second one was the Camp des Cos (1929–1965), which the club had to sell because of a severe economic crisis.

== Notable former players ==
=== Internationals ===
- (Spain) José Luis Riera
- (Spain) Tomeu Llompart
- (Spain) Antoni Amengual
- (Spain) Miguel Gual
- (Spain) Gonzalo Beitia
- (Paraguay) Florencio Amarilla
- (Paraguay) Faust Laguardia

=== Other notable former players ===
- (Slovakia) Vernon De Marco
- (Spain) Pedro Mairata
- (Equatorial Guinea) José Luis Rondo
- (Dominican Republic) Adrián Salcedo
- (Spain) Nico Baleani
- (Spain) Pep Biel
- (Spain) Joan Femenías

== Bibliography ==
- García Gargallo, Manuel (1 January 2023). Los 100 años del Constancia de Inca [The 100 years of Constancia from Inca]. Cuadernos de Fútbol (in Spanish). Vol. 149. CIHEFE. ISSN 1989-6379.
- Quetglas Martorell, Andreu (1982). Síntesis histórica del CD Constancia [Historic synthesis of CD Constancia] (in Spanish). Inca: Impr. Colón.
- Quetglas Martorell, Andreu (2022). 100è Aniversari de la Fundació del CE Constància d'Inca [100th anniversary of the Foundation of CE Constància from Inca] (in Catalan). Palma: Comissió de Centenari del CE Constància d'Inca. DL MP 00617-2022.
- Quetglas Martorell, Andreu (2023). Cent anys en blanc i negre [One hundred years in white-and-black] (in Catalan). Inca: Municipality of Inca.
- Quetglas Martorell, Andreu (2024). Cròniques del Nou Camp d’Inca. La casa del CE Constància 1965–2024 [Stories of the Nou Camp d'Inca. The home of CE Constància 1965–2024] (in Catalan). Inca: Municipality of Inca.
