= Toto (footballer) =

Brazilian footballer

Personal information
- Full name: Sandro Guido Schmidt
- Date of birth: 26 August 1968 (age 58)
- Place of birth: Jaraguá do Sul, Brazil
- Position: Forward

Youth career
- –1986: Juventus-SC

Senior career*
Years	Team	Apps	(Gls)
1986–1991	Juventus-SC		
1992	Flamengo		
1992–1993	Cruzeiro		
1993	Paraná		
1994–1996	Figueirense		
1996	Criciúma		
1997	ABC		
1998–1999	Figueirense		
1999–2000	Chapecoense		
2000	Fortaleza		
2000	Joinville		
2001	Figueirense		
- * Club domestic league appearances and goals as of 11 March 2024

Sandro Guido Schmidt (born 26 August 1968), better known as Toto, is a Brazilian former professional footballer who played as a forward.

== Career ==
A born goalscorer, Toto was revealed by GE Juventus from his hometown, Jaraguá do Sul, being top scorer in 1991 in the Catarinense Championship. In 1992 he moved to Flamengo where he was part of the Brazilian champion squad in 1992. With little space, he was later traded to Cruzeiro, being top scorer and state champion, in addition to the Supercopa Libertadores and Copa do Brasil in 1993. He was acquired by Paraná and again champion, he later played for Figueirense, some other clubs in Santa Catarina, and for Fortaleza, where he won the Campeonato Cearense title. He ended his career in 2001 due to a knee injury.

== Honours ==
Flamengo

- Campeonato Brasileiro: 1992

Cruzeiro

- Campeonato Mineiro: 1992
- Supercopa Libertadores: 1992
- Copa do Brasil: 1993

Paraná

- Campeonato Paranaense: 1993

Fortaleza

- Campeonato Cearense: 2000

Individual

- 1991 Campeonato Catarinense top scorer: 19 goals
- 1992 Campeonato Mineiro top scorer: 16 goals
