= Abarán =

- Municipality
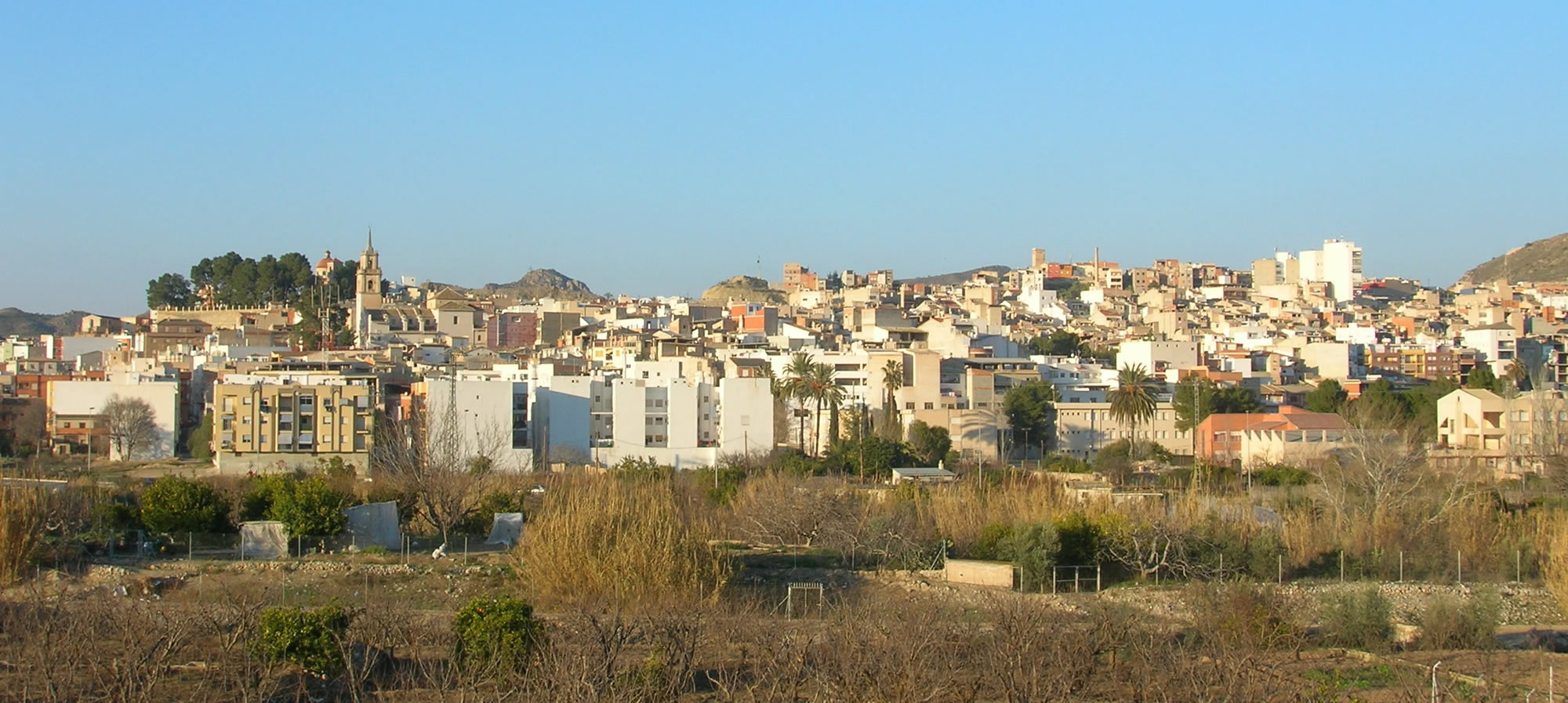

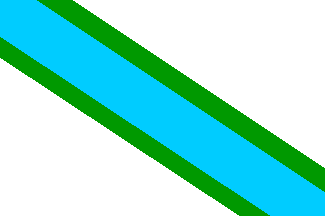
- Flag Coat of arms

- Location in Murcia

- Location in Murcia Location in Spain
- Country: Spain
- Autonomous community: Murcia
- Comarca: Vega Alta del Segura
- Parish: Santiago

Government
  - Mayor: Jesús Gómez Montiel (PSRM/PSOE)

Area
  - Total: 115 km^{2} (44 sq mi)
- Elevation: 400 m (1,300 ft)

Population (2025-01-01)
  - Total: 13,228
- Post code: 30550
- Area code: 968
- Website: Official website

Abarán is a Spanish municipality located in the province of Murcia. It is situated in the Valley of Ricote on the banks of the River Segura 40 km from the city of Murcia. It belongs to the parish of Santiago. It has a population of 12,917 (as of 2005). Abarán belongs to the comarca of Vega Alta del Segura, the capital of which is Cieza. Abarán and Cieza share a healthy rivalry.

== Geography ==
The ground is high in the northeast of Abarán. In the southwest end the ground is also raised. There are six gullies in the northeastern half and two in the southeastern half.

=== Human geography ===
The main town is located in the southwestern half of the territory and had a population of 9,776 in 2019. The village Hoya del Campo is approximately placed in the centre of the municipality and was populated with 1,393 people in 2019. Another locality of the municipality is San José Artesano, which population consisted of 684 in 2019 and is placed in the southwestern half of the territory. Venta de la Aurora is another hamlet, which occurs in the southwest of the northeastern half and had a population of 130 in 2019. Casablanca hamlet is located in the north and was populated with 21 people in 2019. Vergeles hamlet occurs in the northeastern half and it was inhabited by 10 people in 2019.

== Demographics ==
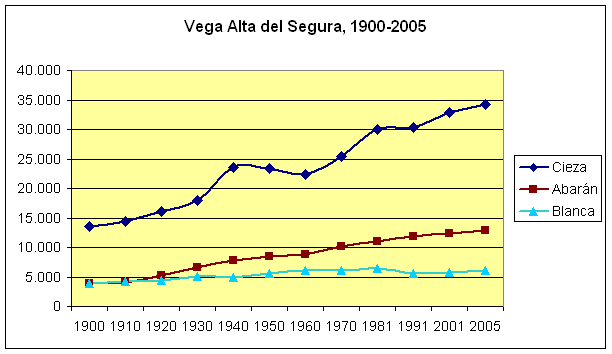
Population levels from 1900–2005 in comparison with Blanca and Cieza

The population of Abarán is 12,968 (2007).

9.179% inhabitants were foreigners in 2019. 72 people are from other countries of Europe, 6.1% are Africans, 2.33% are Americans and 23 Asian people also reside there. The table below shows the population trend of the municipality during the 20th and 21st centuries by the beginning of the decades.

	1900	1910	1920	1930	1940	1950	1960	1970	1981	1991	2001	2011
Population	3,925	4,161	5,393	6,997	7,980	8,461	8,878	10,200	11,183	11,865	12,513	13,157

== Economy ==
28.7% of the territory is utilised with crop purposes. The most widely grown products are the grapes, the peaches, the almonds and the apricots. 77.9% of the agreements were written for jobs in the agriculture and fishing sectors in 2019, and 49.18% were signed by labourers in the second half of 2018.

== Facilities ==
=== Healthcare ===
The municipality is included in the Healtharea IX (Vega Alta del Segura) of Region of Murcia and in a subarea that covers the territory. Abarán hosts two consultorios (primary care centres with fewer functions than the centros de salud) and a centro de salud.

=== Education ===
There are 3 earlychildhood and primary education centres and one secondary education centre in the main village. An early childhood and primary education centre can also be found in Barranco Mólax and another one in Hoya del Campo.

== Tourism ==
=== Points of interest ===
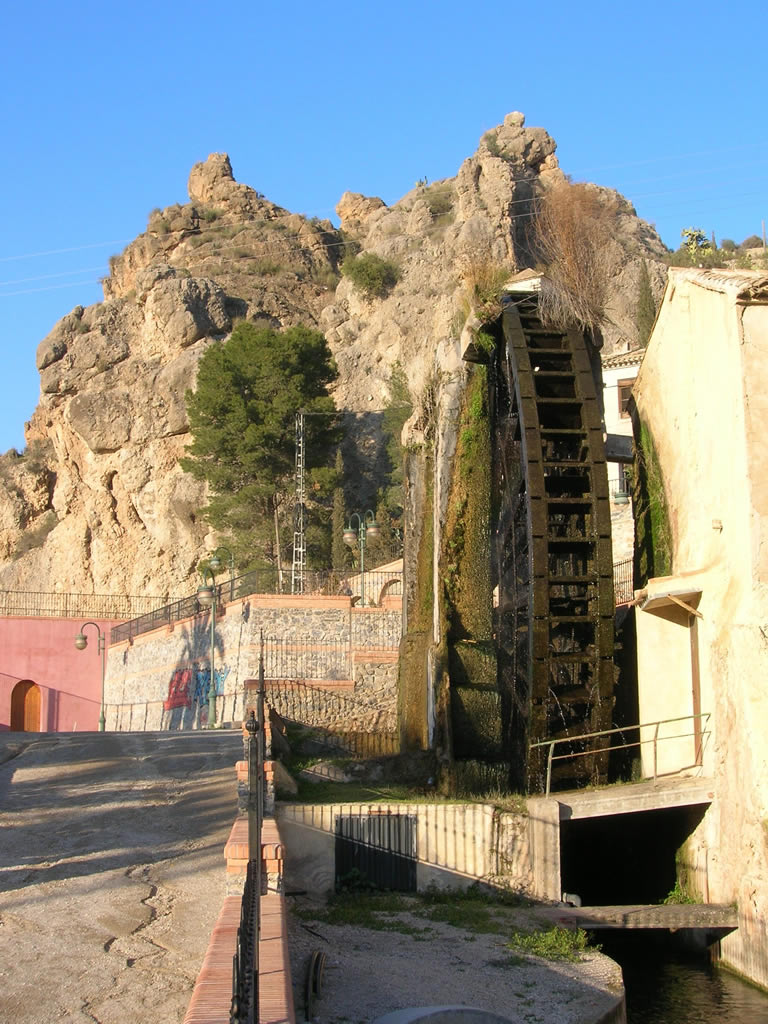
The great waterwheel of Abarán

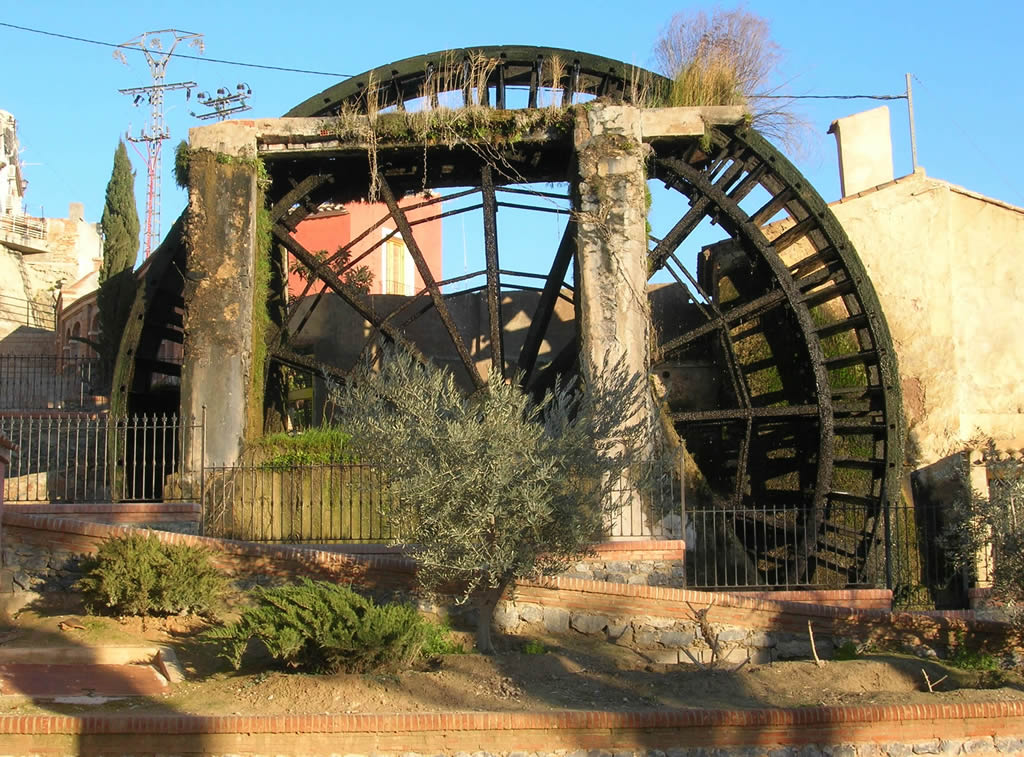
The great waterwheel of Abarán

== See also ==
- List of municipalities in the Region of Murcia
