= Estadio Municipal Álvarez Claro =

Football stadium in Melilla, Spain

Coordinates: 35°17′6″N 2°56′58″W

Estadio Álvarez Claro
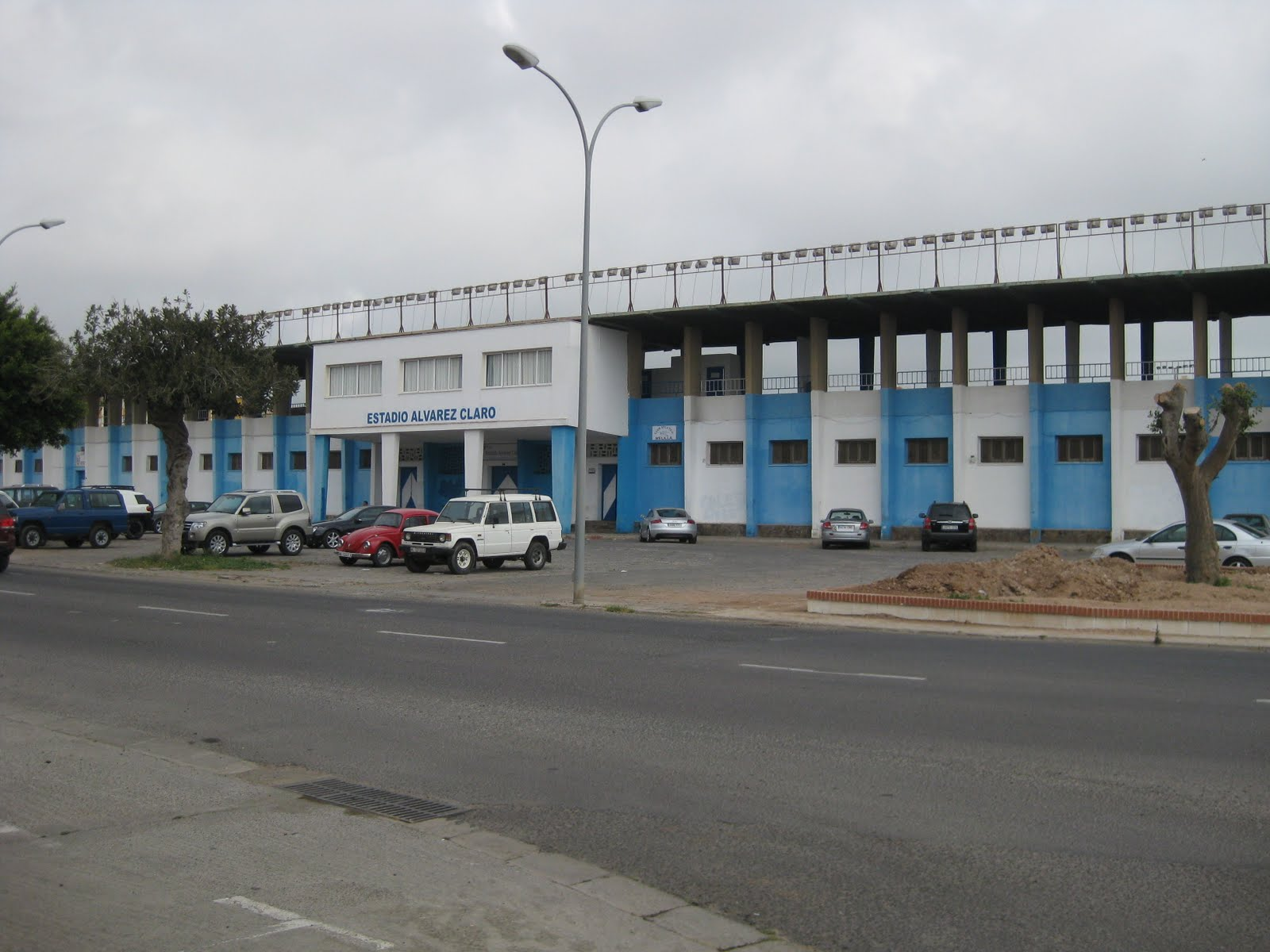
- Interactive map of Estadio Álvarez Claro
- Location: Melilla, Spain
- Capacity: 8,000
- Surface: Grass
- Field size: 106 m × 65 m (348 ft × 213 ft)

Construction
- Opened: 29 September 1945

Tenant
- UD Melilla (1943) (1945–1956) Melilla CF (1945–1976) SD Melilla (1970–1976) UD Melilla (1976–present)

The Estadio Álvarez Claro is a stadium in Melilla, Spain. It is currently used for football matches and it is the home venue of UD Melilla. It was inaugurated on 29 September 1945. It is owned by the autonomous city of Melilla, the stadium holds about 8,000 spectators.
