= 1963–64 Inter-Cities Fairs Cup =

Tournament details
- Dates: 2 October 1963 – 25 June 1964
- Teams: 32

Final positions
- Champions: (Spain) Zaragoza (1st title)
- Runners-up: (Spain) Valencia

Tournament statistics
- Matches played: 65

The sixth Inter-Cities Fairs Cup was played over the 1963–64 season. The competition was won by Zaragoza in a one-off final at Camp Nou in Barcelona against fellow Spaniards and defending champions Valencia. There was only one representative city team, from Copenhagen, with established sides filling all the other slots.

== First round ==
Team 1	Agg.	Team 2	1st leg	2nd leg
Copenhagen XI (Denmark)	4–9	(England) Arsenal	1–7	3–2
Aris Bonnevoie (Luxembourg)	0–2	(Belgium) RFC Liège	0–2	0–0
Glentoran (Northern Ireland)	1–7	(Scotland) Partick Thistle	1–4	0–3
Spartak ZJŠ Brno (Czechoslovakia)	7–1	(Switzerland) Servette	5–0	2–1
Lausanne-Sport (Switzerland)	4–4^{1}	(Scotland) Heart of Midlothian	2–2	2–2
Iraklis (Greece)	1–9	(Spain) Zaragoza	0–3	1–6
Juventus (Italy)	3–3^{2}	(Socialist Federal Republic of Yugoslavia) OFK Beograd	2–1	1–2
Atlético Madrid (Spain)	2–1	(Portugal) Porto	2–1	0–0
Rapid Wien (Austria)	4–2	(France) Racing Paris	1–0	3–2
Shamrock Rovers (Republic of Ireland)	2–3	(Spain) Valencia	0–1	2–2
SC Leipzig (East Germany)	2–3	(Hungary) Újpesti Dózsa	0–0	2–3
Steagul Roșu Brașov (Romania)	2–5	(Bulgaria) Lokomotiv Plovdiv	1–3	1–2
Hertha BSC (West Germany)	1–5	(Italy) Roma	1–3	0–2
Tresnjevka Zagreb (Socialist Federal Republic of Yugoslavia)	1–4	(Portugal) Belenenses	0–2	1–2
1. FC Köln (West Germany)	4–2	(Belgium) Gent	3–1	1–1
DOS Utrecht (Netherlands)	2–8	(England) Sheffield Wednesday	1–4	1–4

^{1} Lausanne-Sport won 3–2 after extra time in a play-off to advance to the second round.

^{2} Juventus won 1–0 in a play-off to advance to the second round.

=== First leg ===
25 September 1963

Copenhagen XI (Denmark)	1-7	(England) Arsenal
Jørgensen 81'		McLeod 9'; Baker 24', 46', 71'; Strong 27', 35', 40'

4 September 1963

Aris Bonnevoie (Luxembourg)	0–2	(Belgium) RFC Liège
	Report	Wégria 50'; Sulon 68'

Stade Camille Polfer, Luxembourg
Attendance: 1,800
Referee: Rudolf Kreitlein (West Germany)

16 September 1963

Glentoran FC (Northern Ireland)	1-4	(Scotland) Partick Thistle
Thompson 38'		Hainey 8'; Yard 58', 75'; Wright 80'

2 October 1963

Spartak Brno (Czechoslovakia)	5-0	(Switzerland) Servette FC
Brada 5'; Jankulovski 18'; Komarek 43'; Pisek 50'; Hlavac 54'

25 September 1963

Lausanne-Sports (Switzerland)	2-2	(Scotland) Heart of Midlothian
Hertig 56'; Gottardi 75'		Traynor 26'; Ferguson 50'

8 September 1963

Iraklis Thessaloniki (Greece)	0-3	(Spain) Real Zaragoza
		Villa 43', 87'; Marcelino 61'

18 September 1963

Shamrock Rovers (Republic of Ireland)	0–1	(Spain) Valencia
	Report	Suco 51'

Dalymount Park, Dublin
Attendance: 26,000
Referee: Franz Geluck (Belgium)

4 September 1963

SC Leipzig (East Germany)	0-0	(Hungary) Újpesti Dózsa

19 September 1963

Steagul Roșu Brașov (Romania)	1–3	(Bulgaria) Lokomotiv Plovdiv
Meszaros 4'	Report	Kolev 14', 37'; Kanchev 30'

Stadionul Tineretului, Brașov
Attendance: 12,000
Referee: György Vadas (Hungary)

2 October 1963

Juventus (Italy)	2–1	(Socialist Federal Republic of Yugoslavia) OFK Beograd
Nené 34'; Zigoni 53'	Report	Gugleta 39'

Stadio Comunale, Turin
Attendance: 2,062
Referee: Josef Kandlbinder (West Germany)

2 October 1963

Atlético Madrid (Spain)	2–1	(Portugal) Porto
Rivés 7', 23'	Report	Romeu 16'

Estadio Metropolitano de Madrid, Madrid
Attendance: 21,000
Referee: François Eurdekian (France)

11 September 1963

Rapid Wien (Austria)	1-0	(France) Racing Club Paris
Flögel 87'

16 October 1963

Hertha BSC (West Germany)	1–3	(Italy) Roma
Rühl 32'	Report	Schütz 21'; De Sisti 60'; Leonardi 72'

Olympiastadion, Berlin
Attendance: 7,300
Referee: Carl W. Hansen (Denmark)

25 September 1963

Trešnjevka Zagreb (Socialist Federal Republic of Yugoslavia)	0–2	(Portugal) Belenenses
	Report	Peres 17'; Estevão Mansidão 40'

Stadion Maksimir, Zagreb
Attendance: 2,100
Referee: Carlo Gambarotta (Italy)

4 September 1963

1. FC Köln (West Germany)	3-1	(Belgium) AA Gent
Sturm 20' (pen.) 72' (pen.); Weber 54'		Delmulle 53'

25 September 1963

DOS Utrecht (Netherlands)	1-4	(England) Sheffield Wednesday
Westphaal 65'		Holiday 5'; Layne 20'; Quinn 49'; Mijnals 64' (o.g.)

=== Second leg ===
22 October 1963

Arsenal (England)	2-3	(Denmark) Copenhagen XI
Skirton 1'; Barnwell 53'		Dyrmose 30', 88'; Jørgensen 78'

Arsenal won 9-4 on aggregate.

2 October 1963

RFC Liège (Belgium)	0–0	(Luxembourg) Aris Bonnevoie
	Report

Stade Jules Georges, Liège
Attendance: 3,000
Referee: Albert Guinnard (Switzerland)

RFC Liège won 2–0 on aggregate.

30 September 1963

Partick Thistle (Scotland)	3-0	(Northern Ireland) Glentoran FC
Smith 53', 67'; Harvey 75'

Partick Thistle won 7-1 on aggregate.

16 October 1963

Servette FC (Switzerland)	1-2	(Czechoslovakia) Spartak Brno
Desbiolles 38'		Komarek 39'; Hlavac 70'

Spartak Brno won 7-1 on aggregate.

9 October 1963

Heart of Midlothian (Scotland)	2-2	(Switzerland) Lausanne-Sports
Cumming 19'; Hamilton 90'		Vittore Gottardi 62'; Hosp 88'

Lausanne 4-4 Hearts on aggregate. Replay required.

9 October 1963

Real Zaragoza (Spain)	6-1	(Greece) Iraklis Thessaloniki
Canario 16'; Murillo 35', 46'; Sigi 56'; Enderiz 82', 90'		Lianis 60'

Zaragoza won 9-1 on aggregate.

10 October 1963

(Spain) Valencia	2–2	Shamrock Rovers (Republic of Ireland)
Guillot 63'; Arnal 81'	Report	Tuohy 39'; Mooney 56'

Estadio de Mestalla, Valencia
Attendance: 45,000
Referee: Clemente Henriques (Portugal)

Valencia won 3–2 on aggregate.

11 September 1963

Újpesti Dózsa (Hungary)	3-2	(East Germany) SC Leipzig
Varhidi 1' (pen.); Bene 46'; Kaposzta 68'		Trölitzsch 63'; Frenzel 89'

Újpest won 3-2 on aggregate.

16 October 1963

OFK Beograd (Socialist Federal Republic of Yugoslavia)	2–1	(Italy) Juventus
Gugleta 76'; Milošev 83'		Stacchini 62'

Belgrade

OFK Beograd 3–3 Juventus on aggregate.

9 October 1963

(Portugal) Porto	0–0	Atlético Madrid (Spain)

Estádio das Antas, Porto
Attendance: 35,000
Referee: Cesare Jonni (Italy)

Atlético Madrid won 2–1 on aggregate.

9 October 1963
First Round

Lokomotiv Plovdiv (Bulgaria)	2–1	(Romania) Steagul Roșu Brașov
Mizin 38'; Kolev 39'	Report	Seredai 89'

Stadion Deveti septemvri, Plovdiv
Attendance: 8,200
Referee: Stanislav Fencl (Czechoslovakia)

Lokomotiv Plovdiv won 5–2 on aggregate.

30 October 1963

Roma (Italy)	2–0	(West Germany) Hertha BSC
Schütz 4'; Orlando 70'

Rome

Roma won 5–1 on aggregate.

2 October 1963

Racing Club Paris (France)	2-3	(Austria) Rapid Wien
van Sam 13'; Mahjoub 85'		Schmid 17'; Hasil 20'; Flögel 55'

Wien won 4-2 on aggregate

10 October 1963

Belenenses (Portugal)	2–1	(Socialist Federal Republic of Yugoslavia) Trešnjevka Zagreb
Palico 4'; Estevão Mansidão 70'		Pintarić 28'

Estádio do Restelo, Lisbon
Attendance: 10,000
Referee: José González Echeverría (Spain)

Belenenses won 4–1 on aggregate.

16 October 1963

AA Gent (Belgium)	1-1	(West Germany) 1. FC Köln
de Vos 77'		Overath 55'

Koln won 4-2 on aggregate

15 October 1963

Sheffield Wednesday (England)	4-1	(Netherlands) DOS Utrecht
Layne 5' 52' 70' (pen.); Dobson 14'		van de Bogert 65'

Sheffield Wednesday won 8-2 on aggregate

=== Play-off ===
15 October 1963

Lausanne-Sports (Switzerland)	3-2 [aet]	(Scotland) Heart of Midlothian
Frigerio 13'; Dürr 20' (pen.); Schneiter 103'		Wallace 30'; Ferguson 70'

Lausanne won 3-2 after extra-time in play-off

13 November 1963

Juventus (Italy)	1–0	(Socialist Federal Republic of Yugoslavia) OFK Beograd
Menichelli 82'

Trieste

Juventus won 1–0 in play-off.

== Second round ==
Team 1	Agg.	Team 2	1st leg	2nd leg
Arsenal (England)	2–4	(Belgium) RFC Liège	1–1	1–3
Partick Thistle (Scotland)	3–6	(Czechoslovakia) Spartak ZJŠ Brno	3–2	0–4
Lausanne-Sport (Switzerland)	1–5	(Spain) Zaragoza	1–2	0–3
Juventus (Italy)	3–1	(Spain) Atlético Madrid	1–0	2–1
Rapid Wien (Austria)	2–3	(Spain) Valencia	0–0	2–3
Újpesti Dózsa (Hungary)	3–1	(Bulgaria) Lokomotiv Plovdiv	0–0	3–1
Roma (Italy)	3–1	(Portugal) Belenenses	2–1	1–0
Köln (West Germany)	5–3	(England) Sheffield Wednesday	3–2	2–1

=== First leg ===
13 November 1963

Arsenal (England)	1-1	(Belgium) RFC Liege
Anderson 67'		Kilola 11'

18 November 1963

Partick Thistle (Scotland)	3-2	(Czechoslovakia) Spartak Brno
Yard 29'; Harvey 37' (pen.); Ferguson 51'		Kolacek 65'; Lichtnegl 74'

6 November 1963

Lausanne-Sport (Switzerland)	1-2	(Spain) Real Zaragoza
Cortizo 32' (o.g.)		Canario 14'; Marcelino 33'

4 December 1963

Juventus (Italy)	1–0	(Spain) Atlético Madrid
Stacchini 31'

Stadio Comunale, Turin
Attendance: 7,000
Referee: Alexandros Monastiriotis (Greece)

6 November 1963

Rapid Wien (Austria)	0-0	(Spain) Valencia

20 November 1963

Ujpesti Dozsa (Hungary)	0-0	(Bulgaria) Lokomotiv Plovdiv

4 December 1963

Roma (Italy)	2–1	(Portugal) Belenenses
Schütz 20'; Peres 86' (o.g.)		Peres 58'

Stadio Olimpico, Rome
Attendance: 4,600
Referee: Joseph Heymann (Switzerland)

6 November 1963

1. FC Köln (West Germany)	3-2	(England) Sheffield Wednesday
Müller 28'; Hornig 35'; Sturm 44' (pen.)		Pearson 80', 86'

=== Second leg ===
18 December 1963

RFC Liege (Belgium)	3-1	(England) Arsenal
Crote 42'; Sulon 43'; Wegria 67'		McCullough 32'

Liege won 4-2 on aggregate

27 November 1963

Spartak Brno (Czechoslovakia)	4-0	(Scotland) Partick Thistle
Brada 19', 28'; Jankulovski 40'; Lichtnegl 50'

Brno won 6-3 on aggregate.

20 November 1963

Real Zaragoza (Spain)	3-0	(Switzerland) Lausanne-Sport
Enderiz 29'; Murillo 31'; Marcelino 55'

Zaragzoa won 5-1 on aggregate.

1 January 1964

Atlético Madrid (Spain)	1–2	(Italy) Juventus
Beitia 64'		Da Costa 5'; Menichelli 7'

Santiago Bernabéu, Madrid
Attendance: 50,000
Referee: Kurt Tschenscher (West Germany)

Juventus won 3–1 on aggregate.

27 November 1963

Valencia (Spain)	3-2	(Austria) Rapid Wien
Lage 27' (pen.); Waldo 48'; Gil 70'		Wolny 6'; Flögel 62'

Valencia won 3-2 on aggregate.

4 December 1963

Lokomotiv Plovdiv (Bulgaria)	1-3	(Hungary) Ujpest Dozsa
Chobanov 89'		Bene 41', 71'; Zambo 65'

Ujpesti won 3-1 on aggregate

11 December 1963

Belenenses (Portugal)	0–1	(Italy) Roma
		De Sisti 19'

Estádio do Restelo, Lisbon
Attendance: 13,000
Referee: José González Echeverría (Spain)

Roma won 3–1 on aggregate.

27 November 1963

Sheffield Wednesday (England)	1-2	(West Germany) 1. FC Köln
Layne 16'		Thielen 59'; Overath 66'

Koln won 5-3 on aggregate.

== Quarter-finals ==
Team 1	Agg.	Team 2	1st leg	2nd leg
RFC Liège (Belgium)	2–2^{3}	(Czechoslovakia) Spartak ZJŠ Brno	2–0	0–2
Zaragoza (Spain)	3–2	(Italy) Juventus	3–2	0–0
Valencia (Spain)	6–5	(Hungary) Újpesti Dózsa	5–2	1–3
Roma (Italy)	3–5	(West Germany) Köln	3–1	0–4

^{3} RFC Liegeois won 1–0 in a play-off in Liège to advance to the semi-finals.

=== First leg ===
19 February 1964

RFC Liege (Belgium)	2-0	(Czechoslovakia) Spartak Brno
Letawe 10'; Cribioli 57'

29 January 1964

Zaragoza (Spain)	3–2	(Italy) Juventus
Isasi 10'; Marcelino 58'; Villa 60'		Menichelli 71' (pen.); Dell'Omodarme 82'

La Romareda, Zaragoza
Attendance: 28,000
Referee: Tiny Wharton (Scotland)

8 March 1964

Valencia (Spain)	5-2	(Hungary) Ujpesti Dozsa
Nunez 4' 77' (pen.); Waldo 21', 27', 83'		Göröcs 36'; Bene 57'

29 January 1964

Roma (Italy)	3–1	(West Germany) Köln
Schütz 8' 48' (pen.); Sormani 19'		Thielen 75'

Rome

=== Second leg ===
11 March 1964

Spartak Brno (Czechoslovakia)	2-0	(Belgium) RFC Liege
Lichtnegl 23'; Jankulovski 37'

Teams drew 2-2. Play-off required.

12 February 1964

Juventus (Italy)	0–0	(Spain) Zaragoza

Stadio Comunale, Turin
Attendance: 14,000
Referee: Karl Kainer (Austria)

Zaragoza won 3–2 on aggregate.

8 April 1964

Ujpesti Dozsa (Hungary)	3-1	(Spain) Valencia
Bene 11'; Kuharszki 35'; Göröcs 78'		Nunez 47' (pen.)

Valencia won 6-5 on aggregate.

5 March 1964

Köln (West Germany)	4–0	(Italy) Roma
Benthaus 45'; Pott 67'; Müller 85', 90'

Cologne

Köln won 5–3 on aggregate.

=== Play-off ===
25 March 1964

RFC Liege (Belgium)	1-0	(Czechoslovakia) Spartak Brno
Sulon 70'

== Semi-finals ==
Team 1	Agg.	Team 2	1st leg	2nd leg
RFC Liège (Belgium)	2–2^{4}	(Spain) Zaragoza	1–0	1–2
Valencia (Spain)	4–3	(West Germany) Köln	4–1	0–2

^{4} Zaragoza won 2–0 in a play-off in Zaragoza to advance to the final.

=== First leg ===
22 April 1964

RFC Liege (Belgium)	1-0	(Spain) Real Zaragoza
Wegria 44'

6 May 1964

Valencia (Spain)	4-1	(West Germany) 1.FC Köln
Waldo 14', 70' es:José_Santiago_Baeza Ficha 59'; Gil 63'		Schäfer

=== Second leg ===
7 May 1964

Real Zaragoza (Spain)	2-1	(Belgium) RFC Liege
Santos 61'; Lapetra 77'		Sulon 5'

Teams drew 2-2. Play-off required

14 May 1964

1.FC Köln (West Germany)	2-0	(Spain) Valencia
Benthaus 27'; Müller 37'

=== Play-off ===
28 May 1964

Real Zaragoza (Spain)	2-0	(Belgium) RFC Liege
Duca 41'; Santos 52'

== Final ==
25 June 1964

Zaragoza (Spain)	2–1	(Spain) Valencia
Villa 40'; Marcelino 83'		Urtiaga 42'

Camp Nou, Barcelona
Attendance: 50,000
Referee: Joaquim Fernandes de Campos (Portugal)
