= Fenerbahçe S.K. in European football =

Turkish club in European football

Fenerbahçe in European football
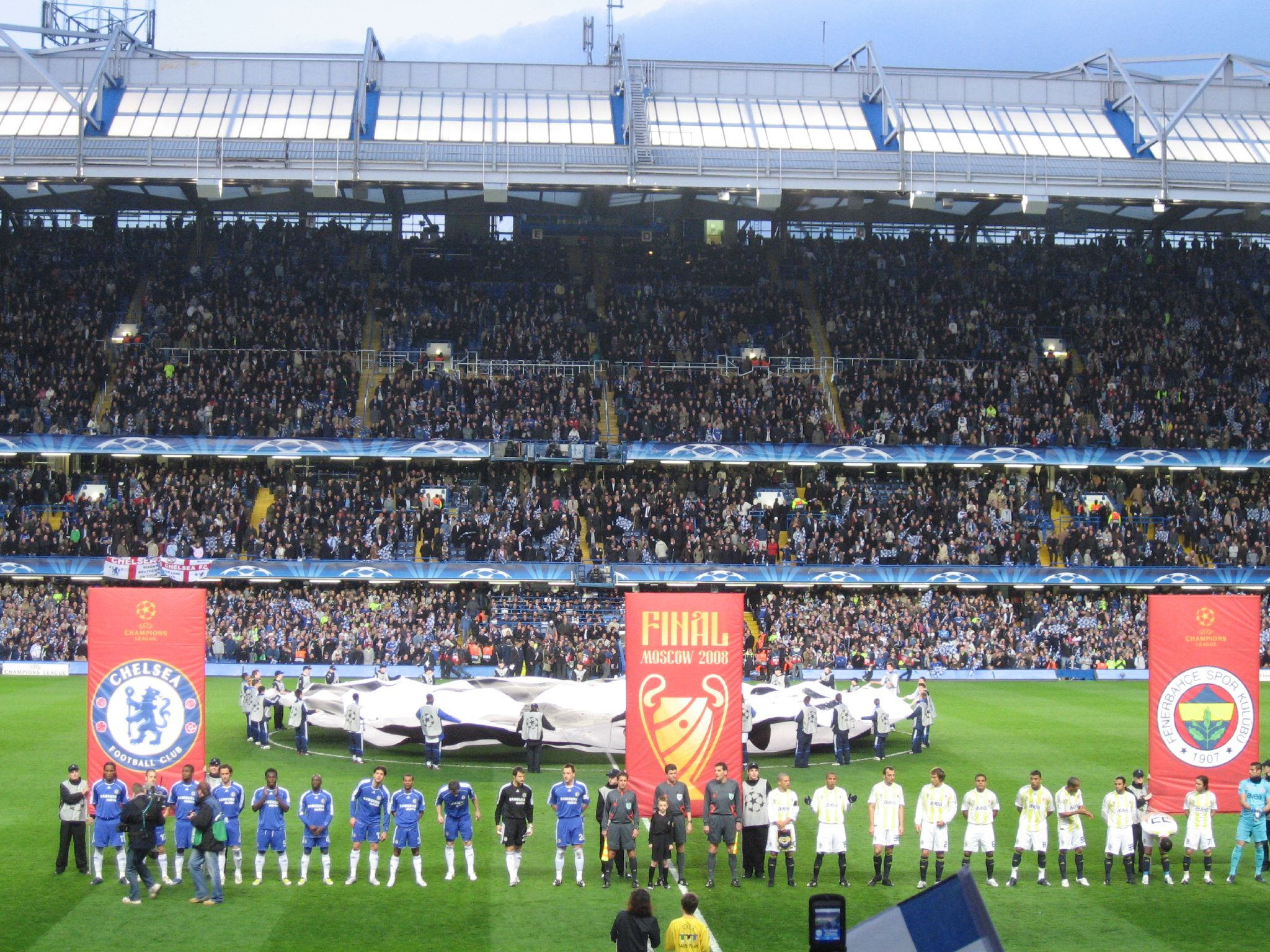
- Ceremony before the quarter-final rematch between Fenerbahçe S.K. and Chelsea F.C. in the 2007–08 UEFA Champions League
- Club: Fenerbahçe S.K.
- First entry: 1959–60 European Cup
- Latest entry: 2026–27 UEFA Champions League

This is an article showing the entire history of Fenerbahçe in European competitions.

== Overall record ==
As of 20 October 2026

| Competition | Pld | W | D | L | GF | GA | GD |
|---|---|---|---|---|---|---|---|
| UEFA Cup / Europa League | 158 | 68 | 41 | 49 | 220 | 198 | +22 |
| European Cup / Champions League | 125 | 40 | 27 | 58 | 148 | 205 | –58 |
| Europa Conference League | 18 | 12 | 0 | 6 | 44 | 23 | +21 |
| Cup Winners' Cup | 9 | 3 | 1 | 5 | 11 | 11 | 0 |
| Total | 310 | 123 | 69 | 118 | 423 | 437 | –14 |

== Best achievements ==
As of 18 April 2024

| Season | Achievement | Notes |
UEFA Cup Winners' Cup
| 1963–64 | Quarter-finalist | eliminated by (Hungary) MTK Budapest 0–2 in Budapest, 3–1 in Istanbul, 0–1 in Rome |
Balkans Cup
| 1966–67 | Champion | won against (Greece) AEK Athens 1–2 in Athens, 1–0 in Istanbul, 3–1 in Istanbul |
UEFA Champions League
| 2007–08 | Quarter-finalist | eliminated by (England) Chelsea 2–1 in Istanbul, 0–2 in London |
UEFA Europa League
| 2012–13 | Semi-finalist | eliminated by (Portugal) Benfica 1–0 in Istanbul, 1–3 in Lisbon |
UEFA Europa Conference League
| 2023–24 | Quarter-finalist | eliminated by (Greece) Olympiacos 2–3 in Piraeus, 1–0 in Istanbul (2–3 p) |

== Matches ==
As of 20 October 2026

| Season | Competition | Round | Opponent | Home | Away | Agg. |
|---|---|---|---|---|---|---|
| 1959–60 | European Cup | Preliminary round | (Hungary) Csepel | 1–1 | 3–2 | 4–3 |
| 1959–60 | European Cup | Round of 16 | (France) Nice | 2–1 | 1–2 | 4–8 |
| 1961–62 | European Cup | First round | (West Germany) 1. FC Nürnberg | 1–2 | 0–1 | 1–3 |
| 1963–64 | European Cup Winners' Cup | First round | (Romania) Petrolul Ploiești | 4–1 | 0–1 | 4–2 |
| 1963–64 | European Cup Winners' Cup | Second round | (Northern Ireland) Linfield | 4–1 | 0–2 | 4–3 |
| 1963–64 | European Cup Winners' Cup | Quarter-finals | (Hungary) MTK Budapest | 3–1 | 0–2 | 3–4 |
| 1964–65 | European Cup | Preliminary round | (Netherlands) DWS | 0–1 | 1–3 | 1–4 |
| 1965–66 | European Cup | Preliminary round | (Belgium) Anderlecht | 0–0 | 1–5 | 1–5 |
| 1968–69 | European Cup | First round | (England) Manchester City | 2–1 | 0–0 | 2–1 |
| 1968–69 | European Cup | Second round | (Netherlands) Ajax | 0–2 | 0–2 | 0–4 |
| 1970–71 | European Cup | First round | (East Germany) Carl Zeiss Jena | 0–4 | 0–1 | 0–5 |
| 1971–72 | UEFA Cup | First round | (Hungary) Ferencváros | 1–1 | 1–3 | 2–4 |
| 1972–73 | UEFA Cup | First round | (Poland) Ruch Chorzów | 1–0 | 0–3 | 1–3 |
| 1973–74 | UEFA Cup | First round | (Romania) Argeș Pitești | 5–1 | 1–1 | 6–2 |
| 1973–74 | UEFA Cup | Second round | (France) Nice | 2–0 | 0–4 | 2–4 |
| 1974–75 | European Cup | First round | (Luxembourg) Jeunesse Esch | 2–0 | 3–2 | 5–2 |
| 1974–75 | European Cup | Second round | (Poland) Ruch Chorzów | 0–2 | 1–2 | 1–4 |
| 1975–76 | European Cup | First round | (Portugal) Benfica | 1–0 | 0–7 | 1–7 |
| 1976–77 | UEFA Cup | First round | (Hungary) Fehérvár | 2–1 | 0–4 | 2–5 |
| 1977–78 | UEFA Cup | First round | (England) Aston Villa | 0–2 | 0–4 | 0–6 |
| 1978–79 | European Cup | First round | (Netherlands) PSV Eindhoven | 2–1 | 1–6 | 3–7 |
| 1979–80 | European Cup Winners' Cup | First round | (England) Arsenal | 0–0 | 0–2 | 0–2 |
| 1980–81 | UEFA Cup | First round | (Bulgaria) Beroe Stara Zagora | 0–1 | 1–2 | 1–3 |
| 1983–84 | European Cup | First round | (Czechoslovakia) Bohemians Praha | 0–1 | 0–4 | 0–5 |
| 1984–85 | UEFA Cup | First round | (Italy) Fiorentina | 0–1 | 0–2 | 0–3 |
| 1985–86 | European Cup | First round | (France) Bordeaux | 0–0 | 3–2 | 3–2 |
| 1985–86 | European Cup | Round of 16 | (Sweden) IFK Göteborg | 2–1 | 0–4 | 2–5 |
| 1989–90 | European Cup | First round | (Czechoslovakia) Sparta Prague | 1–2 | 1–3 | 2–5 |
| 1990–91 | UEFA Cup | First round | (Portugal) Vitória de Guimarães | 3–0 | 3–2 | 6–2 |
| 1990–91 | UEFA Cup | Second round | (Italy) Atalanta | 0–1 | 1–4 | 1–5 |
| 1992–93 | UEFA Cup | First round | (Bulgaria) Botev Plovdiv | 3–1 | 2–2 | 5–3 |
| 1992–93 | UEFA Cup | Second round | (Czechoslovakia) Sigma Olomouc | 1–0 | 1–7 | 2–7 |
| 1994–95 | UEFA Cup | Preliminary round | (Azerbaijan) Turan Tovuz | 5–0 | 2–0 | 7–0 |
| 1994–95 | UEFA Cup | First round | (France) Cannes | 1–5 | 0–4 | 1–9 |
| 1995–96 | UEFA Cup | Preliminary round | (Albania) Partizani | 2–0 | 4–0 | 6–0 |
| 1995–96 | UEFA Cup | First round | (Spain) Real Betis | 1–2 | 0–2 | 1–4 |
| 1996–97 | UEFA Champions League | Qualifying round | (Israel) Maccabi Tel Aviv | 1–1 | 1–0 | 2–1 |
| 1996–97 | UEFA Champions League | Group Stage (Group C) | (Italy) Juventus | 0–1 | 0–2 | 3rd |
| 1996–97 | UEFA Champions League | Group Stage (Group C) | (England) Manchester United | 0–2 | 1–0 | 3rd |
| 1996–97 | UEFA Champions League | Group Stage (Group C) | (Austria) Rapid Wien | 1–0 | 1–1 | 3rd |
| 1997–98 | UEFA Cup | First round | (Romania) Steaua București | 1–2 | 0–0 | 1–2 |
| 1998–99 | UEFA Cup | Second qualifying round | (Sweden) IFK Göteborg | 1–0 | 1–2 | 2–2 (a) |
| 1998–99 | UEFA Cup | First round | (Italy) Parma | 1–0 | 1–3 | 2–3 |
| 1999–2000 | UEFA Cup | First round | (Hungary) MTK Budapest | 0–2 | 0–0 | 0–2 |
| 2001–02 | UEFA Champions League | Third qualifying round | (Scotland) Rangers | 2–1 | 0–0 | 2–1 |
| 2001–02 | UEFA Champions League | Group Stage (Group F) | (Spain) Barcelona | 0–3 | 0–1 | 4th |
| 2001–02 | UEFA Champions League | Group Stage (Group F) | (Germany) Bayer Leverkusen | 1–2 | 1–2 | 4th |
| 2001–02 | UEFA Champions League | Group Stage (Group F) | (France) Lyon | 0–1 | 1–3 | 4th |
| 2002–03 | UEFA Champions League | Third qualifying round | (Netherlands) Feyenoord | 0–2 | 0–1 | 0–3 |
| 2002–03 | UEFA Cup | First round | (Sweden) AIK | 3–1 | 3–3 | 6–4 |
| 2002–03 | UEFA Cup | Second round | (Greece) Panathinaikos | 1–1 | 1–4 | 2–5 |
| 2004–05 | UEFA Champions League | Group Stage (Group D) | (France) Lyon | 1–3 | 2–4 | 3rd |
| 2004–05 | UEFA Champions League | Group Stage (Group D) | (England) Manchester United | 3–0 | 2–6 | 3rd |
| 2004–05 | UEFA Champions League | Group Stage (Group D) | (Czech Republic) Sparta Prague | 1–0 | 1–0 | 3rd |
| 2004–05 | UEFA Cup | Round of 32 | (Spain) Zaragoza | 0–1 | 1–2 | 1–3 |
| 2005–06 | UEFA Champions League | Group Stage (Group E) | (Italy) Milan | 0–4 | 1–3 | 4th |
| 2005–06 | UEFA Champions League | Group Stage (Group E) | (Netherlands) PSV Eindhoven | 3–0 | 0–2 | 4th |
| 2005–06 | UEFA Champions League | Group Stage (Group E) | (Germany) Schalke 04 | 3–3 | 0–2 | 4th |
| 2006–07 | UEFA Champions League | Second qualifying round | (Faroe Islands) B36 | 4–0 | 5–0 | 9–0 |
| 2006–07 | UEFA Champions League | Third qualifying round | (Ukraine) Dynamo Kyiv | 2–2 | 1–3 | 3–5 |
| 2006–07 | UEFA Cup | First round | (Denmark) Randers | 2–1 | 3–0 | 5–1 |
| 2006–07 | UEFA Cup | Group Stage (Group H) | (England) Newcastle United | – | 0–1 | 3rd |
| 2006–07 | UEFA Cup | Group Stage (Group H) | (Spain) Celta Vigo | – | 0–1 | 3rd |
| 2006–07 | UEFA Cup | Group Stage (Group H) | (Italy) Palermo | 3–0 | – | 3rd |
| 2006–07 | UEFA Cup | Group Stage (Group H) | (Germany) Eintracht Frankfurt | 2–2 | – | 3rd |
| 2006–07 | UEFA Cup | Round of 32 | (Netherlands) AZ | 3–3 | 2–2 | 5–5 (a) |
| 2007–08 | UEFA Champions League | Third qualifying round | (Belgium) Anderlecht | 1–0 | 2–0 | 3–0 |
| 2007–08 | UEFA Champions League | Group Stage (Group G) | (Italy) Inter Milan | 1–0 | 0–3 | 2nd |
| 2007–08 | UEFA Champions League | Group Stage (Group G) | (Netherlands) PSV Eindhoven | 2–0 | 0–0 | 2nd |
| 2007–08 | UEFA Champions League | Group Stage (Group G) | (Russia) CSKA Moscow | 3–1 | 2–2 | 2nd |
| 2007–08 | UEFA Champions League | Round of 16 | (Spain) Sevilla | 3–2 | 2–3 (a.e.t.) | 5–5 (3–2 p) |
| 2007–08 | UEFA Champions League | Quarter-finals | (England) Chelsea | 2–1 | 0–2 | 2–3 |
| 2008–09 | UEFA Champions League | Second qualifying round | (Hungary) MTK Budapest | 2–0 | 5–0 | 7–0 |
| 2008–09 | UEFA Champions League | Third qualifying round | (Serbia) Partizan | 2–1 | 2–2 | 4–3 |
| 2008–09 | UEFA Champions League | Group Stage (Group G) | (Portugal) Porto | 1–2 | 1–3 | 4th |
| 2008–09 | UEFA Champions League | Group Stage (Group G) | (England) Arsenal | 2–5 | 0–0 | 4th |
| 2008–09 | UEFA Champions League | Group Stage (Group G) | (Ukraine) Dynamo Kyiv | 0–0 | 0–1 | 4th |
| 2009–10 | UEFA Europa League | Third qualifying round | (Hungary) Budapest Honvéd | 5–1 | 1–1 | 6–2 |
| 2009–10 | UEFA Europa League | Play-off round | (Switzerland) Sion | 2–2 | 2–0 | 4–2 |
| 2009–10 | UEFA Europa League | Group Stage (Group H) | (Netherlands) Twente | 1–2 | 1–0 | 1st |
| 2009–10 | UEFA Europa League | Group Stage (Group H) | (Moldova) Sheriff Tiraspol | 1–0 | 1–0 | 1st |
| 2009–10 | UEFA Europa League | Group Stage (Group H) | (Romania) Steaua București | 3–1 | 1–0 | 1st |
| 2009–10 | UEFA Europa League | Round of 32 | (France) Lille | 1–1 | 1–2 | 2–3 |
| 2010–11 | UEFA Champions League | Third qualifying round | (Switzerland) Young Boys | 0–1 | 2–2 | 2–3 |
| 2010–11 | UEFA Europa League | Play-off round | (Greece) PAOK | 1–1 (a.e.t.) | 0–1 | 1–2 |
| 2012–13 | UEFA Champions League | Third qualifying round | (Romania) Vaslui | 1–1 | 4–1 | 5–2 |
| 2012–13 | UEFA Champions League | Play-off round | (Russia) Spartak Moscow | 1–1 | 1–2 | 2–3 |
| 2012–13 | UEFA Europa League | Group Stage (Group C) | (Germany) Borussia Mönchengladbach | 0–3 | 4–2 | 1st |
| 2012–13 | UEFA Europa League | Group Stage (Group C) | (France) Marseille | 2–2 | 1–0 | 1st |
| 2012–13 | UEFA Europa League | Group Stage (Group C) | (Cyprus) AEL Limassol | 2–0 | 1–0 | 1st |
| 2012–13 | UEFA Europa League | Round of 32 | (Belarus) BATE Borisov | 1–0 | 0–0 | 1–0 |
| 2012–13 | UEFA Europa League | Round of 16 | (Czech Republic) Viktoria Plzeň | 1–1 | 1–0 | 2–1 |
| 2012–13 | UEFA Europa League | Quarter-finals | (Italy) Lazio | 2–0 | 1–1 | 3–1 |
| 2012–13 | UEFA Europa League | Semi-finals | (Portugal) Benfica | 1–0 | 1–3 | 2–3 |
| 2013–14 | UEFA Champions League | Third qualifying round | (Austria) Red Bull Salzburg | 3–1 | 1–1 | 4–2 |
| 2013–14 | UEFA Champions League | Play-off round | (England) Arsenal | 0–3 | 0–2 | 0–5 |
| 2015–16 | UEFA Champions League | Third qualifying round | (Ukraine) Shakhtar Donetsk | 0–0 | 0–3 | 0–3 |
| 2015–16 | UEFA Europa League | Play-off round | (Greece) Atromitos | 3–0 | 1–0 | 4–0 |
| 2015–16 | UEFA Europa League | Group Stage (Group A) | (Norway) Molde | 1–3 | 2–0 | 2nd |
| 2015–16 | UEFA Europa League | Group Stage (Group A) | (Netherlands) Ajax | 1–0 | 0–0 | 2nd |
| 2015–16 | UEFA Europa League | Group Stage (Group A) | (Scotland) Celtic | 1–1 | 2–2 | 2nd |
| 2015–16 | UEFA Europa League | Round of 32 | (Russia) Lokomotiv Moscow | 2–0 | 1–1 | 3–1 |
| 2015–16 | UEFA Europa League | Round of 16 | (Portugal) Braga | 1–0 | 1–4 | 2–4 |
| 2016–17 | UEFA Champions League | Third qualifying round | (France) Monaco | 2–1 | 1–3 | 3–4 |
| 2016–17 | UEFA Europa League | Play-off round | (Switzerland) Grasshopper | 3–0 | 2–0 | 5–0 |
| 2016–17 | UEFA Europa League | Group Stage (Group A) | (England) Manchester United | 2–1 | 1–4 | 1st |
| 2016–17 | UEFA Europa League | Group Stage (Group A) | (Netherlands) Feyenoord | 1–0 | 1–0 | 1st |
| 2016–17 | UEFA Europa League | Group Stage (Group A) | (Ukraine) Zorya Luhansk | 2–0 | 1–1 | 1st |
| 2016–17 | UEFA Europa League | Round of 32 | (Russia) Krasnodar | 1–1 | 0–1 | 1–2 |
| 2017–18 | UEFA Europa League | Third qualifying round | (Austria) Sturm Graz | 1–1 | 2–1 | 3–2 |
| 2017–18 | UEFA Europa League | Play-off round | (North Macedonia) Vardar | 1–2 | 0–2 | 1–4 |
| 2018–19 | UEFA Champions League | Third qualifying round | (Portugal) Benfica | 1–1 | 0–1 | 1–2 |
| 2018–19 | UEFA Europa League | Group Stage (Group D) | (Croatia) Dinamo Zagreb | 0–0 | 1–4 | 2nd |
| 2018–19 | UEFA Europa League | Group Stage (Group D) | (Slovakia) Spartak Trnava | 2–0 | 0–1 | 2nd |
| 2018–19 | UEFA Europa League | Group Stage (Group D) | (Belgium) Anderlecht | 2–0 | 2–2 | 2nd |
| 2018–19 | UEFA Europa League | Round of 32 | (Russia) Zenit Saint Petersburg | 1–0 | 1–3 | 2–3 |
| 2021–22 | UEFA Europa League | Play-off round | (Finland) HJK | 1–0 | 5–2 | 6–2 |
| 2021–22 | UEFA Europa League | Group Stage (Group D) | (Germany) Eintracht Frankfurt | 1–1 | 1–1 | 3rd |
| 2021–22 | UEFA Europa League | Group Stage (Group D) | (Greece) Olympiacos | 0–3 | 0–1 | 3rd |
| 2021–22 | UEFA Europa League | Group Stage (Group D) | (Belgium) Antwerp | 2–2 | 3–0 | 3rd |
| 2021–22 | UEFA Europa Conference League | Knockout round play-offs | (Czech Republic) Slavia Prague | 2–3 | 2–3 | 4–6 |
| 2022–23 | UEFA Champions League | Second qualifying round | (Ukraine) Dynamo Kyiv | 1–2 (a.e.t.) | 0–0 | 1−2 |
| 2022–23 | UEFA Europa League | Third qualifying round | (Czech Republic) Slovácko | 3–0 | 1–1 | 4–1 |
| 2022–23 | UEFA Europa League | Play-off round | Austria Wien | 4–1 | 2–0 | 6–1 |
| 2022–23 | UEFA Europa League | Group Stage (Group B) | (France) Rennes | 3–3 | 2–2 | 1st |
| 2022–23 | UEFA Europa League | Group Stage (Group B) | (Cyprus) AEK Larnaca | 2–0 | 2–1 | 1st |
| 2022–23 | UEFA Europa League | Group Stage (Group B) | (Ukraine) Dynamo Kyiv | 2–1 | 2–0 | 1st |
| 2022–23 | UEFA Europa League | Round of 16 | (Spain) Sevilla | 1–0 | 0–2 | 1–2 |
| 2023–24 | UEFA Europa Conference League | Second qualifying round | (Moldova) Zimbru Chișinău | 5–0 | 4–0 | 9–0 |
| 2023–24 | UEFA Europa Conference League | Third qualifying round | (Slovenia) Maribor | 3–1 | 3–0 | 6–1 |
| 2023–24 | UEFA Europa Conference League | Play-off round | (Netherlands) Twente | 5–1 | 1–0 | 6–1 |
| 2023–24 | UEFA Europa Conference League | Group Stage (Group H) | (Bulgaria) Ludogorets Razgrad | 3–1 | 0–2 | 1st |
| 2023–24 | UEFA Europa Conference League | Group Stage (Group H) | (Denmark) Nordsjælland | 3–1 | 1–6 | 1st |
| 2023–24 | UEFA Europa Conference League | Group Stage (Group H) | (Slovakia) Spartak Trnava | 4–0 | 2–1 | 1st |
| 2023–24 | UEFA Europa Conference League | Round of 16 | (Belgium) Union Saint-Gilloise | 0–1 | 3–0 | 3–1 |
| 2023–24 | UEFA Europa Conference League | Quarter-finals | (Greece) Olympiacos | 1–0 (a.e.t.) | 2–3 | 3–3 (2–3 p) |
| 2024–25 | UEFA Champions League | Second qualifying round | (Switzerland) Lugano | 2–1 | 4–3 | 6–4 |
| 2024–25 | UEFA Champions League | Third qualifying round | (France) Lille | 1–1 (a.e.t.) | 1–2 | 2–3 |
| 2024–25 | UEFA Europa League | League Phase | (Belgium) Union Saint-Gilloise | 2–1 | – | 24th |
| 2024–25 | UEFA Europa League | League Phase | (Netherlands) Twente | – | 1–1 | 24th |
| 2024–25 | UEFA Europa League | League Phase | (England) Manchester United | 1–1 | – | 24th |
| 2024–25 | UEFA Europa League | League Phase | (Netherlands) AZ | – | 1–3 | 24th |
| 2024–25 | UEFA Europa League | League Phase | (Czech Republic) Slavia Prague | – | 2–1 | 24th |
| 2024–25 | UEFA Europa League | League Phase | (Spain) Athletic Bilbao | 0–2 | – | 24th |
| 2024–25 | UEFA Europa League | League Phase | (France) Lyon | 0–0 | – | 24th |
| 2024–25 | UEFA Europa League | League Phase | (Denmark) Midtjylland | – | 2–2 | 24th |
| 2024–25 | UEFA Europa League | Knockout phase play-offs | (Belgium) Anderlecht | 3–0 | 2–2 | 5–2 |
| 2024–25 | UEFA Europa League | Round of 16 | (Scotland) Rangers | 1–3 | 2–0 (a.e.t.) | 3–3 (2–3 p) |
| 2025–26 | UEFA Champions League | Third qualifying round | (Netherlands) Feyenoord | 5–2 | 1–2 | 6–4 |
| 2025–26 | UEFA Champions League | Play-off round | (Portugal) Benfica | 0–0 | 0–1 | 0-1 |
| 2025–26 | UEFA Europa League | League Phase | (Croatia) Dinamo Zagreb | – | 1–3 | 19th |
| 2025–26 | UEFA Europa League | League Phase | (France) Nice | 2–1 | – | 19th |
| 2025–26 | UEFA Europa League | League Phase | (Germany) VfB Stuttgart | 1–0 | – | 19th |
| 2025–26 | UEFA Europa League | League Phase | (Czech Republic) Viktoria Plzeň | – | 0–0 | 19th |
| 2025–26 | UEFA Europa League | League Phase | (Hungary) Ferencváros | 1–1 | – | 19th |
| 2025–26 | UEFA Europa League | League Phase | (Norway) Brann | – | 4–0 | 19th |
| 2025–26 | UEFA Europa League | League Phase | (England) Aston Villa | 0–1 | – | 19th |
| 2025–26 | UEFA Europa League | League Phase | (Romania) FCSB | – | 1–1 | 19th |
| 2025–26 | UEFA Europa League | Knockout phase play-offs | (England) Nottingham Forest | 0–3 | 2–1 | 2–4 |
| 2026–27 | UEFA Champions League | Second qualifying round | (Poland) Górnik Zabrze | 1–0 | 1–1 | 2–1 |
| 2026–27 | UEFA Champions League | Third qualifying round | (Austria) Sturm Graz | 2–0 | 1–0 | 3–0 |
| 2026–27 | UEFA Champions League | Play-off round | (France) Lyon | 1–1 | 2–1 | 3–2 |
| 2026–27 | UEFA Champions League | League Phase | (Italy) Roma | 1–1 | – | |
| 2026–27 | UEFA Champions League | League Phase | (England) Aston Villa | – | 0–6 | |
| 2026–27 | UEFA Champions League | League Phase | (Czech Republic) Slavia Prague | 2–2 | – | |
| 2026–27 | UEFA Champions League | League Phase | (England) Liverpool | 3–2 | – | |
| 2026–27 | UEFA Champions League | League Phase | (Ukraine) Shakhtar Donetsk | | – | |
| 2026–27 | UEFA Champions League | League Phase | (Austria) LASK | – | | |
| 2026–27 | UEFA Champions League | League Phase | (Spain) Villarreal | | – | |
| 2026–27 | UEFA Champions League | League Phase | (Spain) Atlético Madrid | – | | |

== Results by country and club in UEFA competitions ==
As of 20 October 2026

| Country | Club | Pld | W | D | L | GF | GA | GD |
|---|---|---|---|---|---|---|---|---|
| Albania | Partizani | 2 | 2 | 0 | 0 | 6 | 0 | +6 |
| Subtotal | | 2 | 2 | 0 | 0 | 6 | 0 | +6 |
| Austria | Austria Wien | 2 | 2 | 0 | 0 | 6 | 1 | +5 |
| Austria | LASK | 0 | 0 | 0 | 0 | 0 | 0 | 0 |
| Austria | Rapid Wien | 2 | 1 | 1 | 0 | 2 | 1 | +1 |
| Austria | Red Bull Salzburg | 2 | 1 | 1 | 0 | 4 | 2 | +2 |
| Austria | Sturm Graz | 4 | 3 | 1 | 0 | 6 | 2 | +4 |
| Subtotal | | 10 | 7 | 3 | 0 | 18 | 6 | +12 |
| Azerbaijan | Turan Tovuz | 2 | 2 | 0 | 0 | 7 | 0 | +7 |
| Subtotal | | 2 | 2 | 0 | 0 | 7 | 0 | +7 |
| Belarus | BATE Borisov | 2 | 1 | 1 | 0 | 1 | 0 | +1 |
| Subtotal | | 2 | 1 | 1 | 0 | 1 | 0 | +1 |
| Belgium | Anderlecht | 8 | 4 | 3 | 1 | 13 | 9 | +4 |
| Belgium | Antwerp | 2 | 1 | 1 | 0 | 5 | 2 | +3 |
| Belgium | Union Saint-Gilloise | 3 | 2 | 0 | 1 | 5 | 2 | +3 |
| Subtotal | | 13 | 7 | 4 | 2 | 23 | 13 | +10 |
| Bulgaria | Beroe Stara Zagora | 2 | 0 | 0 | 2 | 1 | 3 | −2 |
| Bulgaria | Botev Plovdiv | 2 | 1 | 1 | 0 | 5 | 3 | +2 |
| Bulgaria | Ludogorets Razgrad | 2 | 1 | 0 | 1 | 3 | 3 | 0 |
| Subtotal | | 6 | 2 | 1 | 3 | 9 | 9 | 0 |
| Croatia | Dinamo Zagreb | 3 | 0 | 1 | 2 | 2 | 7 | −5 |
| Subtotal | | 3 | 0 | 1 | 2 | 2 | 7 | −5 |
| Cyprus | AEK Larnaca | 2 | 2 | 0 | 0 | 4 | 1 | +3 |
| Cyprus | AEL Limassol | 2 | 2 | 0 | 0 | 3 | 0 | +3 |
| Subtotal | | 4 | 4 | 0 | 0 | 7 | 1 | +6 |
| Czechia | Bohemians 1905 (Czechoslovakia) | 2 | 0 | 0 | 2 | 0 | 5 | −5 |
| Czechia | Sigma Olomouc (Czechoslovakia) | 2 | 1 | 0 | 1 | 2 | 7 | −5 |
| Czechia | Slavia Prague | 4 | 1 | 1 | 2 | 8 | 9 | −1 |
| Czechia | Slovácko | 2 | 1 | 1 | 0 | 4 | 1 | +3 |
| Czechia | Sparta Prague (Czech Republic) (Czechoslovakia) | 4 | 2 | 0 | 2 | 4 | 5 | −1 |
| Czechia | Viktoria Plzeň | 3 | 1 | 2 | 0 | 2 | 1 | +1 |
| Subtotal | | 17 | 6 | 4 | 7 | 20 | 28 | −12 |
| Denmark | Midtjylland | 1 | 0 | 1 | 0 | 2 | 2 | 0 |
| Denmark | Nordsjælland | 2 | 1 | 0 | 1 | 4 | 7 | −3 |
| Denmark | Randers | 2 | 2 | 0 | 0 | 5 | 1 | +4 |
| Subtotal | | 5 | 3 | 1 | 1 | 11 | 10 | +1 |
| England | Arsenal | 6 | 0 | 2 | 4 | 2 | 12 | −10 |
| England | Aston Villa | 4 | 0 | 0 | 4 | 0 | 13 | −13 |
| England | Chelsea | 2 | 1 | 0 | 1 | 2 | 3 | −1 |
| England | Liverpool | 1 | 1 | 0 | 0 | 3 | 2 | +1 |
| England | Manchester City | 2 | 1 | 1 | 0 | 2 | 1 | +1 |
| England | Manchester United | 7 | 3 | 1 | 3 | 10 | 14 | −4 |
| England | Newcastle United | 1 | 0 | 0 | 1 | 0 | 1 | −1 |
| England | Nottingham Forest | 2 | 1 | 0 | 1 | 2 | 4 | −2 |
| Subtotal | | 25 | 7 | 4 | 14 | 21 | 50 | −29 |
| Faroe Islands | B36 Tórshavn | 2 | 2 | 0 | 0 | 9 | 0 | +9 |
| Subtotal | | 2 | 2 | 0 | 0 | 9 | 0 | +9 |
| Finland | HJK | 2 | 2 | 0 | 0 | 6 | 2 | +4 |
| Subtotal | | 2 | 2 | 0 | 0 | 6 | 2 | +4 |
| France | Bordeaux | 2 | 1 | 1 | 0 | 3 | 2 | +1 |
| France | Cannes | 2 | 0 | 0 | 2 | 1 | 9 | −8 |
| France | Lille | 4 | 0 | 2 | 2 | 4 | 6 | −2 |
| France | Lyon | 8 | 1 | 2 | 4 | 7 | 13 | −6 |
| France | Marseille | 2 | 1 | 1 | 0 | 3 | 2 | +1 |
| France | Monaco | 2 | 1 | 0 | 1 | 3 | 4 | −1 |
| France | Nice | 6 | 3 | 0 | 3 | 8 | 13 | −5 |
| France | Rennes | 2 | 0 | 2 | 0 | 5 | 5 | 0 |
| Subtotal | | 27 | 7 | 8 | 12 | 34 | 54 | −22 |
| Germany | Bayer Leverkusen | 2 | 0 | 0 | 2 | 2 | 4 | −2 |
| Germany | Borussia Mönchengladbach | 2 | 1 | 0 | 1 | 4 | 5 | −1 |
| Germany | Carl Zeiss Jena (East Germany) | 2 | 0 | 0 | 2 | 0 | 5 | −5 |
| Germany | Eintracht Frankfurt | 3 | 0 | 3 | 0 | 4 | 4 | 0 |
| Germany | 1. FC Nürnberg | 2 | 0 | 0 | 2 | 1 | 3 | −2 |
| Germany | Schalke 04 | 2 | 0 | 1 | 1 | 3 | 5 | −2 |
| Germany | VfB Stuttgart | 1 | 1 | 0 | 0 | 1 | 0 | +1 |
| Subtotal | | 14 | 2 | 4 | 8 | 15 | 26 | −11 |
| Greece | Atromitos | 2 | 2 | 0 | 0 | 4 | 0 | +4 |
| Greece | Olympiacos | 4 | 1 | 0 | 3 | 3 | 7 | −4 |
| Greece | Panathinaikos | 2 | 0 | 1 | 1 | 2 | 5 | −3 |
| Greece | PAOK | 2 | 0 | 1 | 1 | 1 | 2 | −1 |
| Subtotal | | 10 | 3 | 2 | 5 | 10 | 14 | −4 |
| Hungary | Csepel | 2 | 1 | 1 | 0 | 4 | 3 | +1 |
| Hungary | Ferencváros | 3 | 0 | 2 | 1 | 3 | 5 | −2 |
| Hungary | Kispest-Honvéd | 2 | 1 | 1 | 0 | 6 | 2 | +4 |
| Hungary | MTK Budapest | 7 | 3 | 1 | 3 | 10 | 6 | +4 |
| Hungary | Videoton | 2 | 1 | 0 | 1 | 2 | 5 | −3 |
| Subtotal | | 16 | 6 | 5 | 5 | 25 | 21 | +4 |
| Israel | Maccabi Tel Aviv | 2 | 1 | 1 | 0 | 2 | 1 | +1 |
| Subtotal | | 2 | 1 | 1 | 0 | 2 | 1 | +1 |
| Italy | Atalanta | 2 | 0 | 0 | 2 | 1 | 5 | −4 |
| Italy | Fiorentina | 2 | 0 | 0 | 2 | 0 | 3 | −3 |
| Italy | Inter Milan | 2 | 1 | 0 | 1 | 1 | 3 | −2 |
| Italy | Juventus | 2 | 0 | 0 | 2 | 0 | 3 | −3 |
| Italy | Lazio | 2 | 1 | 1 | 0 | 3 | 1 | +2 |
| Italy | Milan | 2 | 0 | 0 | 2 | 1 | 7 | −6 |
| Italy | Palermo | 1 | 1 | 0 | 0 | 3 | 0 | +3 |
| Italy | Parma | 2 | 1 | 0 | 1 | 2 | 3 | −1 |
| Italy | Roma | 1 | 0 | 1 | 0 | 1 | 1 | 0 |
| Subtotal | | 16 | 4 | 2 | 10 | 12 | 26 | −14 |
| Luxembourg | Jeunesse Esch | 2 | 2 | 0 | 0 | 5 | 2 | +3 |
| Subtotal | | 2 | 2 | 0 | 0 | 5 | 2 | +3 |
| Moldova | Sheriff Tiraspol | 2 | 2 | 0 | 0 | 2 | 0 | +2 |
| Moldova | Zimbru Chișinău | 2 | 2 | 0 | 0 | 9 | 0 | +9 |
| Subtotal | | 4 | 4 | 0 | 0 | 11 | 0 | +11 |
| Netherlands | Ajax | 4 | 1 | 1 | 2 | 1 | 4 | −3 |
| Netherlands | AZ | 3 | 0 | 2 | 1 | 6 | 8 | −2 |
| Netherlands | DWS | 2 | 0 | 0 | 2 | 1 | 4 | −3 |
| Netherlands | Feyenoord | 6 | 3 | 0 | 3 | 8 | 7 | +1 |
| Netherlands | Twente | 5 | 3 | 1 | 1 | 9 | 4 | +5 |
| Netherlands | PSV Eindhoven | 6 | 3 | 1 | 2 | 8 | 9 | −1 |
| Subtotal | | 26 | 10 | 5 | 11 | 33 | 36 | −3 |
| Northern Ireland | Linfield | 2 | 1 | 0 | 1 | 4 | 3 | +1 |
| Subtotal | | 2 | 1 | 0 | 1 | 4 | 3 | +1 |
| North Macedonia | Vardar | 2 | 0 | 0 | 2 | 1 | 4 | −3 |
| Subtotal | | 2 | 0 | 0 | 2 | 1 | 4 | −3 |
| Norway | Brann | 1 | 1 | 0 | 0 | 4 | 0 | +4 |
| Norway | Molde | 2 | 1 | 0 | 1 | 3 | 3 | 0 |
| Subtotal | | 3 | 2 | 0 | 1 | 7 | 3 | +4 |
| Poland | Górnik Zabrze | 2 | 1 | 1 | 0 | 2 | 1 | +1 |
| Poland | Ruch Chorzów | 4 | 1 | 0 | 3 | 2 | 7 | −5 |
| Subtotal | | 6 | 2 | 1 | 3 | 4 | 8 | −4 |
| Portugal | Benfica | 8 | 2 | 2 | 4 | 4 | 13 | −9 |
| Portugal | Braga | 2 | 1 | 0 | 1 | 2 | 4 | −2 |
| Portugal | Porto | 2 | 0 | 0 | 2 | 2 | 5 | −3 |
| Portugal | Vitória de Guimarães | 2 | 2 | 0 | 0 | 6 | 2 | +4 |
| Subtotal | | 14 | 5 | 2 | 7 | 14 | 24 | −10 |
| Romania | Argeș Pitești | 2 | 1 | 1 | 0 | 6 | 2 | +4 |
| Romania | FCSB | 5 | 2 | 2 | 1 | 6 | 4 | +2 |
| Romania | Petrolul Ploiești | 2 | 1 | 0 | 1 | 4 | 2 | +2 |
| Romania | Vaslui | 2 | 1 | 1 | 0 | 5 | 2 | +3 |
| Subtotal | | 11 | 5 | 4 | 2 | 21 | 10 | +11 |
| Russia | CSKA Moscow | 2 | 1 | 1 | 0 | 5 | 3 | +2 |
| Russia | Krasnodar | 2 | 0 | 1 | 1 | 1 | 2 | −1 |
| Russia | Lokomotiv Moscow | 2 | 1 | 1 | 0 | 3 | 1 | +2 |
| Russia | Spartak Moscow | 2 | 0 | 1 | 1 | 2 | 3 | −1 |
| Russia | Zenit Saint Petersburg | 2 | 1 | 0 | 1 | 2 | 3 | −1 |
| Subtotal | | 10 | 3 | 4 | 3 | 13 | 12 | +1 |
| Scotland | Celtic | 2 | 0 | 2 | 0 | 3 | 3 | 0 |
| Scotland | Rangers | 4 | 2 | 1 | 1 | 5 | 4 | +1 |
| Subtotal | | 6 | 2 | 3 | 1 | 8 | 7 | +1 |
| Serbia | Partizan | 2 | 1 | 1 | 0 | 4 | 3 | +1 |
| Subtotal | | 2 | 1 | 1 | 0 | 4 | 3 | +1 |
| Slovakia | Spartak Trnava | 4 | 3 | 0 | 1 | 8 | 2 | +6 |
| Subtotal | | 4 | 3 | 0 | 1 | 8 | 2 | +6 |
| Slovenia | Maribor | 2 | 2 | 0 | 0 | 6 | 1 | +5 |
| Subtotal | | 2 | 2 | 0 | 0 | 6 | 1 | +5 |
| Spain | Athletic Bilbao | 1 | 0 | 0 | 1 | 0 | 2 | −2 |
| Spain | Atlético Madrid | 0 | 0 | 0 | 0 | 0 | 0 | 0 |
| Spain | Barcelona | 2 | 0 | 0 | 2 | 0 | 4 | −4 |
| Spain | Celta Vigo | 1 | 0 | 0 | 1 | 0 | 1 | −1 |
| Spain | Real Betis | 2 | 0 | 0 | 2 | 1 | 4 | −3 |
| Spain | Sevilla | 4 | 2 | 0 | 2 | 6 | 7 | −1 |
| Spain | Villarreal | 0 | 0 | 0 | 0 | 0 | 0 | 0 |
| Spain | Zaragoza | 2 | 0 | 0 | 2 | 1 | 3 | −2 |
| Subtotal | | 12 | 2 | 0 | 10 | 8 | 21 | −13 |
| Sweden | AIK | 2 | 1 | 1 | 0 | 6 | 4 | +2 |
| Sweden | IFK Göteborg | 4 | 2 | 0 | 2 | 4 | 7 | −3 |
| Subtotal | | 6 | 3 | 1 | 2 | 10 | 11 | −1 |
| Switzerland | Grasshoppers | 2 | 2 | 0 | 0 | 5 | 0 | +5 |
| Switzerland | Lugano | 2 | 2 | 0 | 0 | 6 | 4 | +2 |
| Switzerland | Sion | 2 | 1 | 1 | 0 | 4 | 2 | +2 |
| Switzerland | Young Boys | 2 | 0 | 1 | 1 | 2 | 3 | −1 |
| Subtotal | | 8 | 5 | 2 | 1 | 17 | 9 | +8 |
| Ukraine | Dynamo Kyiv | 8 | 2 | 3 | 3 | 8 | 9 | −1 |
| Ukraine | Shakhtar Donetsk | 2 | 0 | 1 | 1 | 0 | 3 | −3 |
| Ukraine | Zorya Luhansk | 2 | 1 | 1 | 0 | 3 | 1 | +2 |
| Subtotal | | 12 | 3 | 5 | 4 | 11 | 13 | −2 |
| Total | | 310 | 123 | 69 | 118 | 423 | 437 | −14 |

== Goalscorers in UEFA competitions ==
As of 20 October 2026

| Goal | Player |
|---|---|
| 15 | (Brazil) Alex |
| 12 | (Turkey) Tuncay Şanlı |
| 11 | (Bosnia and Herzegovina) Edin Džeko |
| 10 | (Turkey) İrfan Can Kahveci |
| 9 | (Belgium) Michy Batshuayi, (Brazil) Talisca, (Turkey) Semih Şentürk |
| 8 | (Ecuador) Enner Valencia, (Serbia) Dušan Tadić, (Turkey) Cemil Turan |
| 7 | (Brazil) Fernandão, (Morocco) Youssef En-Nesyri, (Netherlands) Dirk Kuyt, (Poland) Sebastian Szymański, (Turkey) Aykut Kocaman |
| 6 | (Brazil) Deivid, (Senegal) Moussa Sow, (Spain) Dani Güiza, (Turkey) Kerem Aktürkoğlu |
| 5 | (Bosnia and Herzegovina) Elvir Bolić, (Brazil) André Santos, (Ghana) Stephen Appiah, (Slovakia) Miroslav Stoch, (Turkey) Bülent Uygun, (Turkey) Ogün Altıparmak |
| 4 | (Brazil) Cristian Baroni, (Nigeria) Emmanuel Emenike, (Norway) Joshua King, (Serbia) Mateja Kežman, (Turkey) Colin Kazim-Richards, (Turkey) Emre Belözoğlu, (Turkey) Ferdi Kadıoğlu, (Turkey) Osman Arpacıoğlu, (Turkey) Şenol Birol, (Turkey) Tümer Metin |
| 3 | (Algeria) Islam Slimani, (Brazil) Josef de Souza, (Brazil) Márcio Nobre, (Cameroon) Pierre Webó, (England) Archie Brown, (England) Mason Greenwood, (Germany) Mërgim Berisha, (Israel) Haim Revivo, (Russia) Roman Neustädter, (Slovenia) Miha Zajc, (Uruguay) Diego Lugano, (Turkey) Can Bartu, (Turkey) Caner Erkin, (Turkey) İsmail Yüksek, (Turkey) Kemalettin Şentürk, (Turkey) Mehmet Topal, (Turkey) Mert Hakan Yandaş, (Turkey) Şeref Has, (Turkey) Uğur Boral |
| 2 | (Bosnia and Herzegovina) Elvir Baljić, (Brazil) Lincoln, (Brazil) Roberto Carlos, (Denmark) Simon Kjær, (Ghana) Samuel Johnson, (Netherlands) Jayden Oosterwolde, (Netherlands) Robin van Persie, (Portugal) Raul Meireles, (Switzerland) Michael Frey, (Turkey) Alper Potuk, (Turkey) Aygün Taşkıran, (Turkey) Bekir İrtegün, (Turkey) Birol Pekel, (Turkey) Egemen Korkmaz, (Turkey) Emre Mor, (Turkey) İsmail Kartal, (Turkey) Lefter Küçükandonyadis, (Turkey) Mehmet Yozgatlı, (Turkey) Oktay Derelioğlu, (Turkey) Raşit Çetiner, (Turkey) Rıdvan Dilmen, (Turkey) Selçuk Şahin, (Turkey) Selçuk Yula, (Turkey) Selim Soydan, (Turkey) Serdar Dursun, (Turkey) Serhat Akın, (Turkey) Şenol Çorlu |
| 1 | (Brazil) Fábio Bilica, (Brazil) Fábio Luciano, (Brazil) Fred , (Brazil) Gökçek Vederson, (Brazil) Gustavo Henrique, (Brazil) Rodrigo Becão, (Brazil) Washington, (Brazil) Willian Arão, (Colombia) Jhon Duran, (Denmark) Brian Steen Nielsen, (Denmark) Jes Høgh, (England) Ryan Kent, (France) Mathieu Valbuena, (Germany) Max Meyer, (Germany) Mesut Özil, (Ghana) Alexander Djiku, (Greece) Dimitrios Pelkas, (Hungary) Attila Szalai, (Italy) João Pedro, (Kosovo) Vedat Muriqi, (Morocco) Aatif Chahechouhe, (Morocco) Nabil Dirar, (Morocco) Sofyan Amrabat, (Netherlands) Jeremain Lens, (Netherlands) Pierre van Hooijdonk, (Nigeria) Jay-Jay Okocha, (Portugal) Luís Nani, (Portugal) Miguel Crespo, (Romania) Viorel Moldovan, (Serbia) Lazar Markovic, (Serbia and Montenegro) Miroslav Stević, (Socialist Federal Republic of Yugoslavia) Fadil Vokrri, (Turkey) Oğuz Aydın, (Turkey) Abdullah Çevrim, (Turkey) Ali Güneş, (Turkey) Ali Nail Durmuş, (Turkey) Arda Güler, (Turkey) Avni Kalkavan, (Turkey) Can Arat, (Turkey) Çağlar Söyüncü, (Turkey) Emin İlhan, (Turkey) Ender Konca, (Turkey) Engin Verel, (Turkey) Ercan Aktuna, (Turkey) Fatih Yiğit Şanlıtürk, (Turkey) Hakan Tecimer, (Turkey) Hasan Ali Kaldırım, (Turkey) Hüseyin Çakıroğlu, (Turkey) İlyas Tüfekçi, (Turkey) Kerim Zengin, (Turkey) Mehmet Aurelio, (Turkey) Mehmet Topuz, (Turkey) Muhammed Gümüşkaya, (Turkey) Mustafa Kaplakaslan, (Turkey) Müjdat Yetkiner, (Turkey) Nedim Doğan, (Turkey) Niyazi Gülseven, (Turkey) Oğuz Çetin, (Turkey) Ozan Tufan, (Turkey) Önder Turacı, (Turkey) Salih Uçan, (Turkey) Serdar Aziz, (Turkey) Şükrü Birand, (Turkey) Tanju Çolak, (Turkey) Turhan Sofuoğlu, (Turkey) Yaşar Mumcuoğlu, (Turkey) Yılmaz Şen, (Turkey) Yusuf Akçiçek, (Turkey) Zafer Tüzün |

| Own goal | Player |
|---|---|
| 1 | (Austria) Dario Marešić, (Belarus) Andrey Harbunow, (Cyprus) Rafail Mamas, (Czech Republic) Radoslav Kováč, (Denmark) Ralf Pedersen, (England) Christian Burgess, (Finland) Matti Peltola, (France) Bafodé Diakité, (France) Mikaël Silvestre, (Netherlands) Dirk Marcellis, (Portugal) Germano, (Slovakia) Dominik Takáč |

== UEFA club ranking ==
=== Current ranking ===
As of 30 May 2026

| Rank | Team | Points |
|---|---|---|
| 41 | (Netherlands) Ajax | 58.250 |
| 42 | (Turkey) Fenerbahçe | 57.750 |
| 43 | (Spain) Real Sociedad | 57.000 |

=== Ranking history ===
| Season | Rank | Points | Ref. |
|---|---|---|---|
| 1960 | 40 ▲ | 1.000 | |
| 1961 | 49 ▼ | 1.000 | |
| 1962 | 59 ▼ | 1.000 | |
| 1963 | 72 ▼ | 1.000 | |
| 1964 | 37 ▲ | 2.166 | |
| 1965 | 102 ▼ | 1.166 | |
| 1966 | 74 ▲ | 1.666 | |
| 1967 | 84 ▼ | 1.666 | |
| 1968 | 90 ▼ | 1.666 | |
| 1969 | 129 ▼ | 1.250 | |
| 1970 | 132 ▼ | 1.250 | |
| 1971 | 184 ▼ | 0.750 | |
| 1972 | 136 ▲ | 1.250 | |
| 1973 | 79 ▲ | 2.250 | |
| 1974 | 66 ▲ | 2.750 | |
| 1975 | 45 ▲ | 3.750 | |
| 1976 | 28 ▲ | 4.750 | |
| 1977 | 19 ▲ | 5.250 | |
| 1978 | 36 ▼ | 4.250 | |
| 1979 | 41 ▼ | 4.000 | |
| 1980 | 49 ▼ | 3.500 | |
| 1981 | 81 ▼ | 2.500 | |
| 1982 | 121 ▼ | 1.500 | |
| 1983 | 113 ▲ | 1.500 | |
| 1984 | 199 ▼ | 0.500 | |
| 1986 | 140 ▲ | 1.250 | |
| 1987 | 138 ▲ | 1.250 | |
| 1988 | 146 ▼ | 1.250 | |
| 1989 | 143 ▲ | 1.250 | |
| 1990 | 139 ▲ | 1.250 | |
| 1991 | 147 ▼ | 1.000 | |
| 1992 | 147 | 1.000 | |
| 1993 | 80 ▲ | 2.250 | |
| 1994 | 80 | 2.250 | |
| 1995 | 77 ▲ | 2.250 | |
| 1996 | 118 ▼ | 1.250 | |
| 1997 | 77 ▲ | 2.250 | |
| 1998 | 111 ▼ | 1.500 | |
| 1999 | 118 ▼ | 19.175 | |
| 2000 | 109 ▲ | 21.925 | |
| 2001 | 100 ▲ | 24.987 | |
| 2002 | 126 ▼ | 19.362 | |
| 2003 | 115 ▲ | 22.495 | |
| 2004 | 126 ▼ | 16.656 | |
| 2005 | 94 ▲ | 23.872 | |
| 2006 | 89 ▲ | 28.634 | |
| 2007 | 66 ▲ | 36.791 | |
| 2008 | 45 ▲ | 51.469 | |
| 2009 | 35 ▲ | 52.445 | |
| 2010 | 34 ▲ | 54.890 | |
| 2011 | 41 ▼ | 50.510 | |
| 2012 | 53 ▼ | 41.310 | |
| 2013 | 47 ▲ | 46.400 | |
| 2014 | 53 ▼ | 41.340 | |
| 2015 | 75 ▼ | 30.020 | |
| 2016 | 52 ▲ | 40.920 | |
| 2017 | 39 ▲ | 51.840 | |
| 2018 | 61 ▼ | 23.500 | |
| 2019 | 45 ▲ | 31.500 | |
| 2020 | 52 ▼ | 31.500 | |
| 2021 | 85 ▼ | 19.500 | |
| 2022 | 107 ▼ | 14.500 | |
| 2023 | 58 ▲ | 30.000 | |
| 2024 | 53 ▲ | 36.000 | |
| 2025 | 46 ▲ | 47.250 | |
| 2026 | 42 ▲ | 57.750 | |
| 2027 | 27 ▲ | 59.750 | |

== Non-UEFA competitions ==
=== Statistics ===
As of 31 August 1968

| Competition | Pld | W | D | L | GF | GA | GD |
|---|---|---|---|---|---|---|---|
| Balkans Cup | 29 | 10 | 6 | 13 | 34 | 45 | –11 |
| Total | 29 | 10 | 6 | 13 | 34 | 45 | –11 |

Pld = Matches played; W = Matches won; D = Matches drawn; L = Matches lost; GF = Goals for; GA = Goals against; GD = Goal Difference.

=== Balkans Cup ===
Balkans Cup
| Season | Round | Opponent | Home | Away | Neutral | Agg. |
|---|---|---|---|---|---|---|
| 1960–61 | Group Stage | (Romania) Steagul Roșu Brașov | 1–1 | 0–3 | —N/a | 4th |
| 1960–61 | Group Stage | (Bulgaria) Levski Sofia | 0–0 | 0–4 | —N/a | 4th |
| 1960–61 | Group Stage | (Albania) Partizani | 1–0 | 0–0 | —N/a | 4th |
| 1960–61 | Group Stage | (Greece) AEK Athens | 5–1 | 2–2 | —N/a | 4th |
| 1961–63 | Group Stage (Group B) | (Bulgaria) Levski Sofia | 0–1 | 0–3 | —N/a | 4th |
| 1961–63 | Group Stage (Group B) | (Albania) Dinamo Tirana | 1–0 | 2–3 | —N/a | 4th |
| 1961–63 | Group Stage (Group B) | (Romania) Dinamo București | 2–4 | 0–3 | —N/a | 4th |
| 1966–67 | Group Stage (Group A) | (Albania) Partizani Tirana | 3–2 | 0–2 | —N/a | 1st |
| 1966–67 | Group Stage (Group A) | (Bulgaria) Cherno More Varna | 3–0 | 1–0 | —N/a | 1st |
| 1966–67 | Group Stage (Group A) | (Romania) UTA Arad | 3–1 | 0–1 | —N/a | 1st |
| 1966–67 | Finals | (Greece) AEK Athens | 1–0 | 1–2 | 3–1 | Champion |
| 1967–68 | Group Stage (Group B) | (Bulgaria) Spartak Sofia | 0–0 | 0–3 | —N/a | 4th |
| 1967–68 | Group Stage (Group B) | (Socialist Federal Republic of Yugoslavia) Olimpija Ljubljana | 1–1 | 0–4 | —N/a | 4th |
| 1967–68 | Group Stage (Group B) | (Greece) AEK Athens | 3–0 | 1–3 | —N/a | 4th |

=== By country ===
As of 31 August 1968

| Country | Club | P | W | D | L | GF | GA | GD |
|---|---|---|---|---|---|---|---|---|
| Albania | Dinamo City | 2 | 1 | 0 | 1 | 3 | 3 | 0 |
| Albania | Partizani | 4 | 2 | 1 | 1 | 4 | 4 | 0 |
| Subtotal | | 6 | 3 | 1 | 2 | 7 | 7 | 0 |
| Bulgaria | Cherno More | 2 | 2 | 0 | 0 | 4 | 0 | +4 |
| Bulgaria | Levski Sofia | 4 | 0 | 1 | 3 | 0 | 8 | -8 |
| Bulgaria | Spartak Sofia | 2 | 0 | 1 | 1 | 0 | 3 | -3 |
| Subtotal | | 8 | 2 | 2 | 4 | 4 | 11 | -7 |
| Greece | AEK Athens | 7 | 4 | 1 | 2 | 16 | 9 | +7 |
| Subtotal | | 7 | 4 | 1 | 2 | 16 | 9 | +7 |
| Romania | Brașov | 2 | 0 | 1 | 1 | 1 | 4 | -3 |
| Romania | Dinamo București | 2 | 0 | 0 | 2 | 2 | 7 | -5 |
| Romania | UTA Arad | 2 | 1 | 0 | 1 | 3 | 2 | +1 |
| Subtotal | | 6 | 1 | 1 | 4 | 6 | 13 | -7 |
| Slovenia; Yugoslavia | Olimpija | 2 | 0 | 1 | 1 | 1 | 5 | -4 |
| Subtotal | | 2 | 0 | 1 | 1 | 1 | 5 | -4 |
| Total | | 29 | 10 | 6 | 13 | 34 | 45 | -11 |

=== Goalscorers ===
As of 31 August 1968

| Goals | Footballers |
|---|---|
| 4 | (Turkey) Nedim Doğan, (Turkey) Ogün Altıparmak, (Turkey) Yaşar Mumcuoğlu, (Turkey) Yüksel Gündüz |
| 2 | (Turkey) Can Bartu, (Turkey) Ercan Aktuna, (Turkey) Kadri Aytaç, (Turkey) Lefter Küçükandonyadis, (Turkey) Yılmaz Şen |
| 1 | (Romania) Ion Nunweiller, (Turkey) Canan Açıkgöz, (Turkey) Fuat Saner, (Turkey) Hüseyin Yazıcı, (Turkey) Selim Soydan, (Turkey) Şeref Has, (Turkey) Tuncay Becedek |
| Own Goal | Çika (Partizani) |
