= Partick Thistle F.C. in European football =

Scottish club in European football

Partick Thistle in European football
- Club: Partick Thistle
- First entry: 1963–64 Inter-Cities Fairs Cup
- Latest entry: 1995 UEFA Intertoto Cup

Titles
- Europa League: 0 (Best: Second round)
- Intertoto Cup: 0 (Best: Group stage)

Partick Thistle Football Club is a Scottish association football club based in the Maryhill area of Glasgow. The club first competed in a European competition in 1963–64, qualifying for the Inter-Cities Fairs Cup following a third-place finish in the Scottish First Division. The club reached the second round, which remains the club's joint best run in a European competition.

== History ==
=== 1963–64 Inter-Cities Fairs Cup ===
Partick Thistle's début in European football came in 1963–64 when they qualified for the Inter-Cities Fairs Cup after finishing third in the Scottish First Division behind Rangers and Kilmarnock respectively. Their first round opponents were Glentoran from Northern Ireland. Thistle won the away leg in Belfast 4–1. In the second leg at home they produced a 3–0 victory to progress to the next round comfortably 7–1 on aggregate. In the second round they faced Czechoslovak club Spartak Brno. The first leg was played at home at Thistle won the tie 3–2. However, on the away leg Spartak Brno produced a convincing 4–0 victory to knock out Partick Thistle 6–3 on aggregate.

Season	Competition	Round	Opponent	Home	Away	Aggregate
1963–64	Inter-Cities Fairs Cup	First round	(Northern Ireland) Glentoran	3–0	4–1	7–1
1963–64	Inter-Cities Fairs Cup	Second round	(Czechoslovakia) Spartak Brno	3–2	0–4	3–6

=== 1972–73 UEFA Cup ===
Thistle qualified for the UEFA Cup for the first and only time in 1972–73 having defeated Celtic in the final of the Scottish League Cup the previous season. They faced Budapest Honvéd of Hungary in the first round. In the first leg of the tie Thistle lost 1–0 at Bozsik József Stadion in Budapest. In the return leg at Firhill they were also beaten, this time 3–0 to exit the tournament 4–0 on aggregate.

Season	Competition	Round	Opponent	Home	Away	Aggregate
1972–73	UEFA Cup	First round	(Hungary) Budapest Honvéd	0–3	0–1	0–4

=== 1995 UEFA Intertoto Cup ===
In 1995, Thistle competed in the UEFA Intertoto Cup. They were drawn in Group 6 along with Keflavík, LASK Linz, Metz and NK Zagreb. Each team played each other once, either home or away. Thistle's first match was against LASK Linz in Austria which ended in a 2–2 draw. Their next game was against Icelandic side Keflavík at home in Glasgow ending in a 3–1 victory. Thistle then faced French club Metz away from home which resulted in a narrow 1–0 defeat. Their final match was against NK Zagreb of Croatia at home narrowly losing 2–1. Thistle finished fourth overall in Group 6 which wasn't enough to qualify for the next round. Metz progressed to the knock-out stages after finishing top of the group with maximum points having won all their matches.

Season	Competition	Group	Opponent	Home	Away
1995–96	UEFA Intertoto Cup	Group 6	(Austria) LASK Linz	–	2–2
1995–96	UEFA Intertoto Cup	Group 6	(Iceland) Keflavík	3–1	–
1995–96	UEFA Intertoto Cup	Group 6	(France) Metz	–	0–1
1995–96	UEFA Intertoto Cup	Group 6	(Croatia) NK Zagreb	1–2	–

Pos	Team	Pld	W	D	L	GF	GA	GD	Pts	Qualification	MET	LAS	ZAG	PAR	KEF
1	(France) Metz	4	4	0	0	5	1	+4	12	Advanced to round of 16	—	1–0	—	1–0	—
2	(Austria) LASK Linz	4	1	2	1	4	4	0	5		—	—	—	2–2	2–1
3	(Croatia) NK Zagreb	4	1	2	1	2	2	0	5		0–1	0–0	—	—	—
4	(Scotland) Partick Thistle	4	1	1	2	6	6	0	4		—	—	1–2	—	3–1
5	(Iceland) Keflavík	4	0	1	3	3	7	−4	1		1–2	—	0–0	—	—

Source: rsssf.com

== Overall record ==
=== By competition ===
Competition	P	W	D	L	GF	GA	GD
Inter-Cities Fairs Cup	4	3	0	1	10	7	+3
UEFA Cup	2	0	0	2	0	4	−4
UEFA Intertoto Cup	4	1	1	2	6	6	0
Total	10	4	1	5	16	17	−1

=== By country ===
Country	Pld	W	D	L	GF	GA	GD	Win%	Ref
Austria	1	0	1	0	2	2	+0	0.00	
Croatia	1	0	0	1	1	2	−1	0.00	
Czechoslovakia	2	1	0	1	3	6	−3	50.00	
France	1	0	0	1	0	1	−1	0.00	
Hungary	2	0	0	2	0	4	−4	0.00	
Iceland	1	1	0	0	3	1	+2	100.00	
Northern Ireland	2	2	0	0	7	1	+6	100.00	
