= Hector Cribioli =

Argentine footballer

Personal information
- Date of birth: August 11, 1936 (age 90)
- Place of birth: Argentina
- Position: Striker

Senior career*
Years	Team	Apps	(Gls)
1960	Toronto Italia		
1960–1961	New York Inter		
1961	Toronto Roma		
1961	Limoges FC		
1961	RFC Liège		
1962	Toronto Italia		
1963–1966	RFC Liège	14	(2)
- * Club domestic league appearances and goals

Hector Cribioli (born August 11, 1936) is an Argentinian former footballer who played as a forward.

== Career ==
Cribioli played with various different clubs in South America before playing abroad in 1960 in the National Soccer League with Toronto Italia. The signing of Cribioli was reflective of Italia's general manager Alan Astri's policy of foreign player recruitment. The acquisition of Cribioli ultimately played dividends for Toronto as the club secured the double (league title & NSL Championship). The team secured the NSL Championship after a series of matches against Montreal Cantalia. After the conclusion of the 1960 NSL season he played in the American Soccer League with New York Inter.

In 1961, league rivals Toronto Roma decided to increase their spending on the transfer market in order to compete with Toronto Italia over league dominance and the attention of the Italian community within the city. As a result, signed Cribiolo for the 1961 season. His spell with Roma was rather brief as he was transferred to Limoges FC of the Division Nationale on July 13, 1961, for a league record fee of $35,000. The remainder of the season he played in the Belgian First Division with R.F.C. Liege., and ultimately returned to Canada the following season After a year hiatus he would return to play with RFC Liege in 1963 and featured in the 1963–64 Inter-Cities Fairs Cup, and 1964–65 Inter-Cities Fairs Cup.

After a short tenure in Europe he returned in 1962 to play with former club Toronto Italia this time in the Eastern Canada Professional Soccer League as the club became a charter member in 1961. In his debut season in the Eastern Canada Professional League (ECPSL) he was selected by team Italia-Roma Selects for the All-Star match and contributed a goal. He featured in the ECPSL Championship final match against Toronto City, and assisted in securing the title for Italia.

== Honors ==
Toronto Italia

- ECPSL Championship: 1962
- NSL Championship: 1960
- National Soccer League: 1960
