= Vasile Seredai =

Romanian footballer

Personal information
- Date of birth: 22 December 1933 (age 92)
- Place of birth: Brașov, Romania
- Height: 1.73 m (5 ft 8 in)
- Position: Forward

Youth career
- 1949–1953: Tractorul Brașov

Senior career*
Years	Team	Apps	(Gls)
1954–1955	Tractorul Brașov		
1956–1958	Rapid București (Note: The statistics for the 1957 unofficial championship called Cupa Primăverii are not taken into consideration.)	50	(11)
1959	Tractorul Brașov		
1960–1965	Steagul Roșu Brașov	106	(36)
Total		156	(47)

International career
1955–1959	Romania B	8	(1)
1957–1958	Romania U23	5	(1)
1959–1962	Romania	4	(3)
- * Club domestic league appearances and goals

Vasile Seredai (born 22 December 1933) is a Romanian former footballer who played as a forward.

== Club career ==
Seredai was born on 22 December 1933 in Brașov, Romania and began playing junior-level football in 1949 at local club Tractorul. In 1954, he started to play for Tractorul's senior squad in Divizia B. Seredai joined Rapid București in 1956, making his Divizia A debut on 29 April under coach Ferenc Rónay in a 1–1 draw against Flacăra Ploiești. He helped the club win the unofficial 1957 Cupa Primăverii. Midway through the 1958–59 season, he left Rapid to rejoin Tractorul in Divizia B. His spell there lasted until the middle of the 1959–60 season, when he returned to the first league by moving to neighboring club Steagul Roșu. Under the guidance of coach Silviu Ploeșteanu, Seredai helped the team win the 1960–61 Balkans Cup. During the same season, he scored a career-best 13 league goals. Subsequently, he netted a brace in a 6–2 win over Olympiacos during the 1961–63 Balkans Cup. He then played in both legs and scored once in the first round of the 1963–64 Inter-Cities Fairs Cup, as his side was defeated 5–2 on aggregate by Lokomotiv Plovdiv. Seredai made his last Divizia A appearance on 6 September 1964 in Steagul Roșu's 1–0 away loss to CSMS Iași, totaling 156 matches with 47 goals in the competition.

== International career ==
From 1955 to 1959, Seredai was consistently featured for Romania's under-23 and B sides.

Seredai played four matches and scored three goals for Romania, making his debut on 30 August 1959 under coach Augustin Botescu in a 3–2 friendly victory against Poland. At the time of his debut, he was playing in the second league for Tractorul Brașov. His following appearances for the national team were also friendlies, and he scored a brace in a win over Turkey and one goal in a victory against Morocco.

== Career statistics ==
Romania score listed first, score column indicates score after each Seredai goal.

List of international goals scored by Vasile Seredai for Romania
No.	Date	Venue	Opponent	Score	Result	Competition
1	8 October 1961	Stadionul 23 August, Bucharest, Romania	Turkey	1–0	4–0	Friendly
2	8 October 1961	Stadionul 23 August, Bucharest, Romania	Turkey	2–0	4–0	Friendly
3	30 September 1962	Stadionul 23 August, Bucharest, Romania	Morocco	3–0	4–0	Friendly

== Honours ==
Rapid București

- Cupa Primăverii: 1957

Steagul Roșu Brașov

- Balkans Cup: 1960–61
