= 1961–63 Balkans Cup =

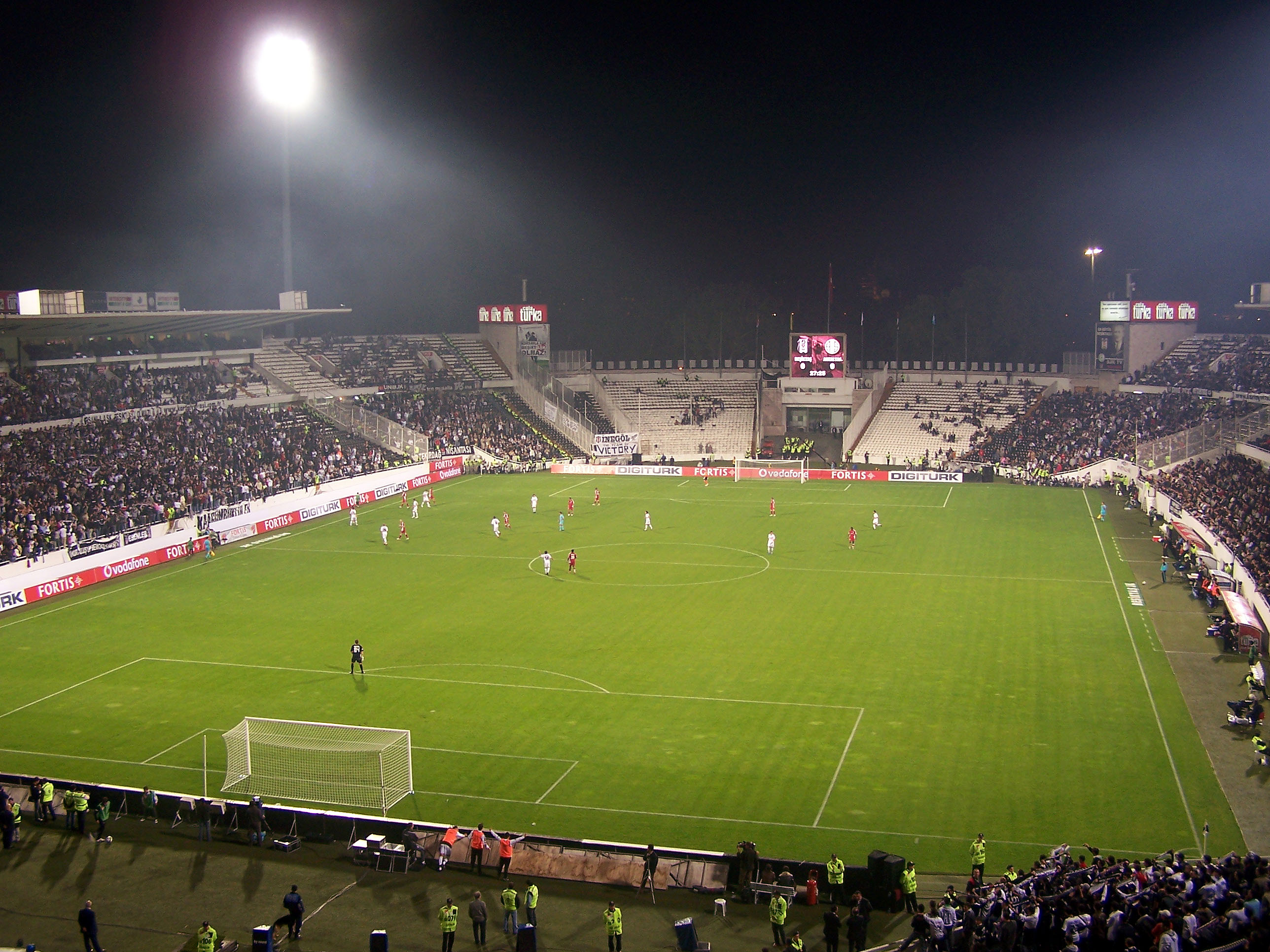
- İnönü Stadium, hosted the play-off of the final.

Tournament details
- Country: Balkans
- Teams: 8

Final positions
- Champions: (Greece) Olympiacos
- Runners-up: (Bulgaria) Levski Sofia

Tournament statistics
- Matches played: 21
- Goals scored: 67 (3.19 per match)

The 1961–63 Balkans Cup was the second Balkans Cup, a football competition for representative clubs from the Balkan states. It was contested by 8 teams and Olympiacos won the trophy.

== Group Stage ==
=== Group A ===
| Pos | Team | Pld | W | D | L | GF | GA | GR | Pts | Qualification |
|---|---|---|---|---|---|---|---|---|---|---|
| 1 | (Greece) Olympiacos (A) | 4 | 2 | 1 | 1 | 9 | 11 | 0.818 | 5 | Advances to finals |
| 2 | (Romania) Steagul Roșu Brașov | 4 | 2 | 0 | 2 | 9 | 6 | 1.500 | 4 | |
| 3 | (Socialist Federal Republic of Yugoslavia) Sarajevo | 4 | 1 | 1 | 2 | 8 | 9 | 0.889 | 3 | |
| 4 | (Turkey) Galatasaray (Note: Galatasaray retired from the competition having played two games against Olympiacos and their record was cancelled.) | 0 | 0 | 0 | 0 | 0 | 0 | — | 0 | |

Source: rsssf.com
Rules for classification: 1) points; 2) goal average; 3) number of goals scored
(A) Advance to a further round
Notes:
21 February 1962

| Olympiacos (Greece) | 1–0 | (Romania) Steagul Roșu Brașov |
|---|---|---|
| Yfantis 31' |

Karaiskakis Stadium, Piraeus
Referee: Hak Giurüz (Turkey)

11 April 1962

| Olympiacos (Greece) | 1–0 | (Turkey) Galatasaray |
|---|---|---|
| Psychos 47' |

Karaiskakis Stadium, Piraeus

9 May 1962

| Olympiacos (Greece) | 3–2 | (Socialist Federal Republic of Yugoslavia) Sarajevo |
|---|---|---|
| Sideris 5', 36'; Psychos 11' | | Peskovic 69'; Jatic 80' |

Karaiskakis, Piraeus
Referee: Faruk Talu (Turkey)

17 May 1962

| Sarajevo (Socialist Federal Republic of Yugoslavia) | 3–3 | (Greece) Olympiacos |
|---|---|---|
| Aslanovic 7', 58'; Mioc 48' | | Sideris 10', 26', 72' |

Koševo, Sarajevo
Referee: Kotari (Albania)

1 August 1962

| Steagul Roșu Brașov (Romania) | 6–2 | (Greece) Olympiacos |
|---|---|---|
| Meszaros 5'; Seredai 20', 71'; Nagy 35'; Selymesi 38'; Năftănăilă 50' | | Yfantis 57', 67' (pen.) |

Tineretului, Brașov
Referee: Kotari (Albania)

19 September 1962

| Sarajevo (Socialist Federal Republic of Yugoslavia) | 2–0 | (Romania) Steagul Roșu Brașov |

Koševo, Sarajevo

24 October 1962

| Galatasaray (Turkey) | 1–1 | (Greece) Olympiacos |
|---|---|---|
| Oktay 78' | | Papazoglou 6' |

Mithat Paşa, Istanbul

4 November 1962

| Steagul Roșu Brașov (Romania) | 3–1 | (Socialist Federal Republic of Yugoslavia) Sarajevo |

Tineretului, Brașov

=== Group B ===
| Pos | Team | Pld | W | D | L | GF | GA | GR | Pts | Qualification |
|---|---|---|---|---|---|---|---|---|---|---|
| 1 | (Bulgaria) Levski Sofia (A) | 6 | 3 | 3 | 0 | 11 | 5 | 2.200 | 9 | Advances to finals |
| 2 | (Albania) Dinamo Tirana | 6 | 2 | 3 | 1 | 9 | 8 | 1.125 | 7 | |
| 3 | (Romania) Dinamo București | 6 | 2 | 2 | 2 | 13 | 11 | 1.182 | 6 | |
| 4 | (Turkey) Fenerbahçe | 6 | 1 | 0 | 5 | 5 | 14 | 0.357 | 2 | |

Source: rsssf.com
Rules for classification: 1) points; 2) goal average; 3) number of goals scored
(A) Advance to a further round

24 December 1961

| Dinamo Tirana (Albania) | 1–1 | (Romania) Dinamo București |

Dinamo, Tirana

11 March 1962

| Dinamo București (Romania) | 2–3 | (Albania) Dinamo Tirana |

Dinamo, Bucharest

22 March 1962

| Levski Sofia (Bulgaria) | 2–2 | (Albania) Dinamo Tirana |

Rakovski, Sofia

25 March 1962

| Fenerbahçe (Turkey) | 1–0 | (Albania) Dinamo Tirana |
|---|---|---|
| Aytaç 56' |

Şükrü Saracoğlu, Istanbul

21 June 1962

| Dinamo Tirana (Albania) | 0–0 | (Bulgaria) Levski Sofia |

Dinamo, Tirana

12 August 1962

| Dinamo București (Romania) | 2–4 | (Bulgaria) Levski Sofia |

Dinamo, Bucharest

12 September 1962

| Levski Sofia (Bulgaria) | 1–1 | (Romania) Dinamo București |

Rakovski, Sofia

20 September 1962

| Fenerbahçe (Turkey) | 2–4 | (Romania) Dinamo București |
|---|---|---|
| Gündüz 75'; Doğan 82' | | Pîrcălab 5', 53'; Eftimie 11'; Ene 73' |

Şükrü Saracoğlu, Istanbul

13 November 1962

| Fenerbahçe (Turkey) | 0–1 | (Bulgaria) Levski Sofia |
|---|---|---|
| | | Kostov 84' |

Şükrü Saracoğlu, Istanbul

23 November 1962

| Dinamo Tirana (Albania) | 3–2 | (Turkey) Fenerbahçe |
|---|---|---|
| Vorfi 2', 25', 65' | | Yazıcı 4'; Becedek 36' |

Dinamo, Tirana

| Levski Sofia (Bulgaria) | 3–0 Awarded^{1} | (Turkey) Fenerbahçe |

| Dinamo București (Romania) | 3–0 Awarded^{1} | (Turkey) Fenerbahçe |

Notes

- Note 1: Fenerbahçe didn't show up.

== Finals ==
| Team 1 | Agg. | Team 2 | 1st leg | 2nd leg | Play-off |
|---|---|---|---|---|---|
| Olympiacos (Greece) | 2–1 | (Bulgaria) Levski Sofia | 1–0 | 0–1 | 1–0 |

=== First leg ===
3 April 1963

| Olympiacos (Greece) | 1–0 | (Bulgaria) Levski Sofia |
|---|---|---|
| Sideris 37' |

Karaiskakis Stadium, Piraeus
Referee: Branko Tešanić (Yugoslavia)

=== Second leg ===
8 May 1963

| Levski Sofia (Bulgaria) | 1–0 | (Greece) Olympiacos |
|---|---|---|
| Yordanov 8' |

Vasil Levski National Stadium, Sofia
Referee: Pănureanu (Romania)

1–1 on aggregate, so a playoff was scheduled.

=== Play–off ===
18 September 1963

| Olympiacos (Greece) | 1–0 | (Bulgaria) Levski Sofia |
|---|---|---|
| Stefanakos 87' |

Mithat Paşa, Istanbul
Referee: Faruk Talu (Turkey)
