= Christian Müller =

Christian Müller may refer to:

- Christian Müller (footballer, born 1938), German footballer
- Christian Müller (footballer, born 1960), German footballer
- Christian Müller (cyclist) (born 1982), German cyclist
- Christian Müller (footballer, born 1983), German footballer
- Christian Müller (footballer, born 1984), German footballer
- Christian Müller (organ builder), Dutch organ builder
- Christian Müller (psychiatrist) (1921–2013), Swiss teacher, psychiatrist, psychoanalyst and writer
- Christian Philipp Müller (born 1957), Swiss artist
- Christian Müller (historian), German historian and sinologist

== See also ==
- Christian Møller (1904–1980), Danish chemist and physicist
