= Thies Schulze =

Thies Schulze (born 1972) is a German historian. Schulze studied history and Italian at the Free University of Berlin and completed semesters abroad at Princeton University in the US and the University of Siena in Italy. He received his doctorate from the Free University of Berlin in 2002. From February 2008 to April 2016, he was a leader of a research cluster named "Religion and Politics" at the University of Münster, researching the Vatican's attitude to nationality conflicts in the interwar period. As a part of this project, Thies Schulze co-edited a book entitle Grenzüberschreitende Religion (Cross-border religion) with Christian Müller and published it in 2013. He has since worked as a Senior Academic Councillor (Akademischer Oberrat) at the Institute for Historical Studies at the University of Bonn, where he habilitated in 2015.

His father is Hagen Schulze, a modern historian.

== Selected publications ==
- Katholischer Universalismus und Vaterlandsliebe: Nationalitätenkonflikte und globale Kirche in den Grenzregionen Ostoberschlesien und Elsass-Lothringen, 1918-1939 (2020)
- Grenzüberschreitende Religion : Vergleichs- und Kulturtransferstudien zur neuzeitlichen Geschichte (2013)
- Dante Alighieri als nationales Symbol Italiens (1793-1915) (2005)
