= Albert Sulon =

Belgian footballer (1938–2020)

Personal information
- Date of birth: 3 April 1938
- Place of birth: Vottem, Belgium
- Date of death: 29 June 2020 (aged 82)
- Position: Centre back

Senior career*
Years	Team	Apps	(Gls)
1957–1959	RFC Liège		
1959–1962	UR Namur		
1962–1963	RES Jamboise		
1963–1968	RFC Liège		
1968–1972	Tilleur FC		

International career
1965–1967	Belgium	6	(0)
- * Club domestic league appearances and goals

Albert Sulon (3 April 1938 – 29 June 2020) was a Belgian footballer who played as a centre back.

== Career ==
Sulon played for RFC Liège, UR Namur, RES Jamboise and Tilleur FC.

He also earned 6 caps for the Belgium national team in 1965 through 1967.

His twin brother Gérard Sulon was also a footballer.
