= Jean-Marie Letawe =

Belgian footballer

Personal information
- Date of birth: 30 November 1936 (age 89)

International career
| Years | Team | Apps | (Gls) |
| 1960 | Belgium | 2 | (0) |

Jean-Marie Letawe (born 30 November 1936) is a Belgian footballer. He played in two matches for the Belgium national football team in 1960.
