= Gérard Sulon =

Belgian footballer (1938–2020)

Personal information
- Date of birth: 3 April 1938
- Date of death: 18 October 2020 (aged 82)
- Position: Midfielder

Senior career*
Years	Team	Apps	(Gls)
1957–1968	RFC Liège		
1968–1969	CS Schaerbeek		
1969–1970	Beerschot VAV		
1970–1973	Crossing Schaerbeek		

International career
1964–1965	Belgium	6	(0)
- * Club domestic league appearances and goals

Gérard Sulon (3 April 1938 – 18 October 2020) was a Belgian footballer who played as a midfielder.

== Career ==
Sulon played for RFC Liège, CS Schaerbeek, Beerschot VAV and Crossing Schaerbeek.

He also earned 6 caps for the Belgium national team during 1964 and 1965.

His twin brother Albert Sulon was also a footballer.

Sulon died on 18 October 2020, aged 82.
