= Ernie Yard =

Scottish footballer

Personal information
- Full name: Ernest John Yard
- Date of birth: 3 May 1941
- Place of birth: Stranraer, Scotland
- Date of death: 23 November 2004 (aged 63)
- Place of death: Cape Town, South Africa
- Position: Winger

Youth career
- ?–1958: Stranraer

Senior career*
Years	Team	Apps	(Gls)
1958–1963	Stranraer	34	(10)
1961–1963	Kilmarnock	25	(16)
1963	Partick Thistle	15	(5)
1963–1965	Bury	45	(13)
1965–1966	Crystal Palace	37	(3)
1966–1969	Reading	104	(6)
1969–1974	Cape Town City	?	(?)
- * Club domestic league appearances and goals

Ernest John Yard (3 May 1941 – 23 November 2004) was a Scottish professional footballer, who played as a forward or winger. He could also play as a full back.

== Playing career ==
Yard was born in Stranraer, Scotland and began his youth career at hometown club Stranraer going on to a senior career at the club. He later played for Kilmarnock, Partick Thistle, Bury, Crystal Palace and Reading before moving to South Africa where he played for Cape Town City. Yard made a total of 260 appearances in the Scottish League and the English Football League and scored 53 goals.

Ernie Yard died in November 2004, aged 63.

== Honours ==
Cape Town City

- UTC Bowl: 1971, 1973
- Champion of Champions: 1974
