= Christian Müller (historian) =

German historian

Christian Müller FRHistS
- Born: Witten, West Germany
- Other names: Christian Mueller; 穆正德 (Mù Zhèngdé)

Academic background
- Education: Heidelberg University (M.A); University of Oxford (M.St)
- Influences: Edgar Feuchtwanger

Academic work
- Discipline: Modern history
- Sub-discipline: Global History; Transnational history; Imperial History
- Institutions: University of Nottingham Ningbo China (2015–2023)

Director of Global Institute for Silk Road Studies, UNNC
- In office 2018 – February 2023

Co-Director of the Centre for Advanced International Studies, UNNC
- In office 2019 – February 2023
- Succeeded by: Matteo Salonia

Christian Müller FRHistS is a German historian previously residing in Ningbo, China. His research focuses on global connections between the West and Asia from the early modern period to the 21st century, emphasizing imperialism, transnationalism, normative orders, labour mobility, travel writing, encounters between civilizations, curiosity, and identities.

Müller has a life-long affiliation to University College Oxford. In November 2018, he was elected as a Fellow of the Royal Historical Society.

== Education ==
Between 1995 and 1998, Müller studied history, Law, Politics, Germanic languages at Heidelberg University. In 1999, he completed his Master of Studies in Modern History and Political thought at University College, Oxford. Between 1999 and 2002, he studied History and Germanic Languages at Heidelberg University for a Master of Arts. Between 2003 and 2007, he was a doctoral student in history at the same university.

== Academic career ==
=== In Europe ===
Müller was a Junior Research Group Leader and Lecturer in Modern History at the Cluster of Excellence "Religion and Politics" at the University of Münster (2008–12). He was a Visiting Researcher at Ghent University (2011–13) and a lecturer in history, Culture and Communications at HAWK University of Applied Sciences and Arts, Göttingen (2014–15). In Göttingen, he was writing a book entitled The Politics of Expertise: The Institutionalization of Transnational Legal and Social Networks in Europe, 1840–1914. However, this book project was aborted with his move to China.

=== In China ===
Müller went to Ningbo, China in August 2015. He was an Associate Professor in Modern European and International History at UNNC (2015–2023). He worked as the Director of Research at School of International Studies, co-director of the Centre for Advanced International Studies, and the Director of the Global Institute for Silk Roads Studies (2018–2023) of this university. At UNNC, Müller received Lord Dearing Award (2020), Merit prize of "Four knows" of Ningbo Spirit Translation Competition (September 2020), and Vice-Chancellor's Medal of the University of Nottingham (June 2018).

He has been an Associate Fellow of the Higher Education Academy since July 2016. Since September 2018, he has held Visiting fellowship at St Antony's College, Oxford. Since May 2022, he has been a Fellow of the Peer Review College at Arts and Humanities Research Council (AHRC).

In China, Müller has previously worked with, guest lectured, or disseminated research findings at the Ningbo University, Tinyi Ge Library, Fudan University, and Princeton University Press' China division.

== Works ==
=== Books ===
- Travel Writings on Asia. Curiosity, Identities, and Knowledge across the East, c. 1200 to the Present (Palgrave Macmillan, 2022), with Matteo Salonia
- Grenzüberschreitende Religion: Vergleichs- und Kulturtransferstudien zur neuzeitlichen Geschichte [Cross-border Religion: Comparative and Cultural Transfer Studies on Modern History] (Vandenhoeck und Ruprecht Verlage, 2014), with Thies Schulze
- The Invention of Industrial Pasts: Heritage, Political Culture and Economic Debates in Great Britain and Germany, 1850–2010 (Wissner Verlag, 2013), with Peter Itzen
- Königin Viktoria und ihre Zeit [Queen Victoria and Her Time](Muster-Schmidt Verlag, 2004), with Edgar Feuchtwanger

=== Selected articles ===
- "Corinne Chaponnière and Henry Dunant, The Man of the Red Cross." Social History of Medicine (2023).
- "And What Do We Know About China? The International Labour Office, Albert Thomas and Republican China, 1919–1930." Journal of the Royal Asiatic Society China 28.1 (2018): 101–122.
- "Peaks of Internationalism in Social Engineering: A Transnational History of International Social Reform Associations and Belgian Agency, 1860–1925."Revue Belge de Philologie et d'Histoire 90.4 (2012): 1297–1319, with Jasmien Van Daele.
- "Designing the model European—Liberal and republican concepts of citizenship in Europe in the 1860s: The Association Internationale pour le Progrès des Sciences Sociales." History of European Ideas 37.2 (2011): 223–231.

=== Selected book chapters ===
- "German Dreams of Empire in the Far East: The German Expeditions to the East and Ferdinand von Richthofen’s Encounters with Asia, 1850–1880." In Travel Writings on Asia: Curiosity, Identities, and Knowledge Across the East, c. 1200 to the Present. Singapore: Springer Nature Singapore (2022): 175–209.
- "Between Adoption and Resistance: China’s Efforts of ‘Understanding the West’, the Challenges of Transforming Monarchical Legitimacy and the Rise of Oriental Exceptionalism, 1860–1910." In International Flows in the Belt and Road Initiative Context: Business, People, History and Geography (2020): 219–252.
- "The Politics of Expertise: The Association Internationale pour le Progrès des Sciences Sociales. Democratic Peace Movements and International Law Networks in Europe 1858–75." In Shaping the Transnational Sphere: Experts, Networks, and Issues (c. 1850–1930). New York: Berghahn Books (2014).
