= Estevão Mansidão =

Portuguese footballer

Estevão
Personal information
- Full name: Estevão António do Espírito Santo Mansidão
- Date of birth: 11 August 1940 (age 86)
- Place of birth: Alcochete, Portugal
- Position: Midfielder

Youth career
- 1959–1960: Belenenses

Senior career*
Years	Team	Apps	(Gls)
1960–1965	Belenenses	58	(13)
1965–1969	Sporting Braga	99	(19)
1969–1972	Belenenses	66	(10)

International career
1967	Portugal	1	(0)
- * Club domestic league appearances and goals

Estevão António do Espírito Santo Mansidão (born 11 August 1940 in Alcochete) is a former Portuguese footballer who played as a midfielder.
