= Karel Lichtnégl =

Czech footballer (1936–2015)

Personal information
- Date of birth: 30 August 1936
- Place of birth: Hodonín, Czechoslovakia
- Date of death: 15 January 2015 (aged 78)
- Place of death: Brno, Czech Republic
- Position: Forward

Senior career*
Years	Team	Apps	(Gls)
1957	TJ Dynamo Praha	5	(2)
1957–1959	VTJ Dukla Pardubice	40	(9)
1960–1962	RH Brno	38	(16)
1962–1967	TJ Spartak ZJŠ Brno	100	(42)
1967–1970	TJ NHKG Ostrava		
1970–1971	TJ Zbrojovka Brno	3	(0)
1972–1975	Spartak Brno KPS		

International career
1963–1964	Czechoslovakia	3	(0)
	Czechoslovakia Olympic	14	(4)
Medal record
Men's football
Representing Czechoslovakia
Olympic Games
Silver medal – second place	1964 Tokyo	Team competition
- * Club domestic league appearances and goals

Karel Lichtnégl (30 August 1936 – 15 January 2015) was a Czech former footballer who competed for silver-medal-winning Czechoslovakia in the 1964 Summer Olympics. At club level, he played for teams including Zbrojovka Brno. Lichtnégl died on 15 January 2015.
