= Tuncay Becedek =

Turkish footballer (1942–2021)

Personal information
- Date of birth: 19 July 1942
- Date of death: 23 April 2021 (aged 78)
- Position: Midfielder

International career
| Years | Team | Apps | (Gls) |
| 1962–1965 | Turkey | 3 | (0) |

Tuncay Becedek (19 July 1942 – 23 April 2021) was a Turkish footballer. He played for Fenerbahçe and in three matches for the Turkey national football team from 1962 to 1965.
