= Vicente Soriano =

- Born: 1953 (age 72–73); Puçol, Spain
- Occupation: Businessperson
- Title: President of Valencia CF
- Term: 2008–2009
- Predecessor: Juan Bautista Soler
- Successor: Manuel Llorente

Vicente Soriano Serra (born 1953) is a Spanish businessman who became the president and majority shareholder of Valencia CF in 2008, after reaching an agreement with Juan Bautista Soler to take over the presidency of the club and purchase Soler's shares to the value of 70.7 million euros. After an ill-fated attempt to resolve the club's debts, he was finally succeeded by Manuel Llorente.

== Career ==
Having started out in the orange export business, in the 1990s he got involved in construction as a real estate broker, and subsequently as a property developer and representative of large investor groups.

== Football ==
He entered the world of soccer in 2004 when forming part of Paco Roig's "Cor i Força", the team that was running against then ousted president Jaume Ortí. Juan Bautista Soler won the election and Soriano accepted the role offered of vice-president.

Soriano was charged with the selection of plans for the new stadium (see Nou Mestalla). Finally Soler rejected said projects. As a result, his relations with the then-president deteriorated. He was relieved of the vice-presidency in January 2006, although never he sold his allocation of shares. He resigned from the board in June 2007. He threatened to return to the club accompanied by Juan Villalonga to get a hold of Soler's stock, a situation that did not bear fruit. Villalonga briefly took over the running of the club in 2008, but when he proposed to buy the 37% held by Soler, Soriano reconciled with the majority shareholder and reached an agreement for the buying and selling of the Soler family shares in an amount set at 70.7 million euros, which was overturned after Soriano failed to sell the old Mestalla ground by the end of the year, finally resigning on 4 June 2009 because he had still failed to sell it. An attempt to raise capital by improving income from television rights also failed.

However, following an absence of just one month, during which time Manuel Llorente took over, Soriano returned in July, having gained 51% of the shares and linked up with a mysterious company called Inversiones Dalport, an investment company supposedly from Uruguay but with an office in Madrid. Soriano announced that none of the star players such as David Villa, Juan Manuel Mata or David Silva would now need to be sold, as all the debts would be wiped clean.

However, failure to find any information on Dalport on the Internet prior to the announcement prompted an outcry at the press conference. The media's suspicions were further heightened when fans noticed that the logo of an eagle used by Dalport had in fact been copied from a children's colouring-in book. Prematurely ousted president Llorente echoed the fans' suspicions Like 70% of fans, Llorente does not believe that Soriano will deliver, and warned that Valencia is opening themselves up to a potential investment scam.

When, as predicted, Dalport failed to deliver, on August 21, 2009 Fundació VCF took over, becoming the main shareholder with 72.5% of shares, using a loan from Bancaixa and guaranteed by the local government. The Fundació is not allowed to end up with less than 51%, thereby ensuring stability within Valencia CF and cementing Manuel Llorente as the bona fide president.

In 2014, Soler hired a hitman from Eastern Europe to kidnap Soriano. However, the hitman turned out to be working for the police, so Soler was arrested. While he is waiting to find out whether he will go to prison, he is not allowed to leave the country or go within 15 metres of Vicente Soriano. This will not be easy, as his home is 20 metres from the door of Soriano's office.
