= Juan Soler (businessman) =

Spanish businessman

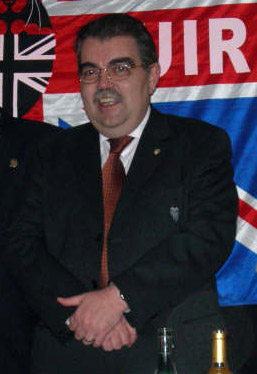
- Soler, at the 5-year anniversary dinner for Penya Guiri/Che-UK, a London-based Valencia CF supporters' club
- Born: Juan Bautista Soler Luján; 9 February 1956 (age 70); Valencia, Spain
- Occupations: Businessman, real estate developer
- Known for: President of Valencia CF (2004-2008) and majority shareholder.
- Board member of: Grupo Juan Bautista Soler, Gecina
- Website: www.juanbautistasoler.com

Juan Bautista Soler Luján is a Spanish businessman, real estate developer and former president of Valencia CF.

He made his fortune as a real estate developer and investor in Valencia. He is best known as the former president and majority shareholder of Spanish professional football club Valencia CF between 2004 and 2008. He was best remembered in this role as promoter of a new stadium for the club, the Nou Mestalla and leaving the club with large debts.

== Career ==
His company, Grupo Juan Bautista Soler created large apartment buildings and residential developments in Southern Spain. Along with other real estate developers like Manuel Manrique, José Manuel Loureda, Manuel Jove, and Rafael del Pino, Soler rode the wave of increasing economic growth in Spain since its addition to the European Union. In particular he has worked with fellow developers Enrique Buñuelos and Joaquín Rivero. His real estate developments and partnerships have resulted in immense wealth. In 2004, he became president of Valencia.

== Football ==
On 4 June 2004, the Soler family gained control of Valencia CF. They acquired the majority stake in Valencia by purchasing the shares held by former president Francisco Roig. Several individuals associated with the club, such as Manuel Llorente, and media outlets supported the Soler family's takeover as a way to diminish Roig's power and restore stability to the club.

Soler held control over the club during the next four seasons. On 12 March 2008, he resigned as chairman of Valencia CF citing health reasons as a result of the significant physical and psychological strain he and the club were experiencing.

== Abduction attempt ==
In 2014 he was arrested for attempting to hire an Eastern European hitman to abduct the president who had succeeded him at Valencia CF, Vicente Soriano, in a dispute over shares. He was barred from leaving the country, and from entering within 15 metres of Soriano.
