= Anil Murthy =

Singaporean diplomat and sports executive (born 1973)

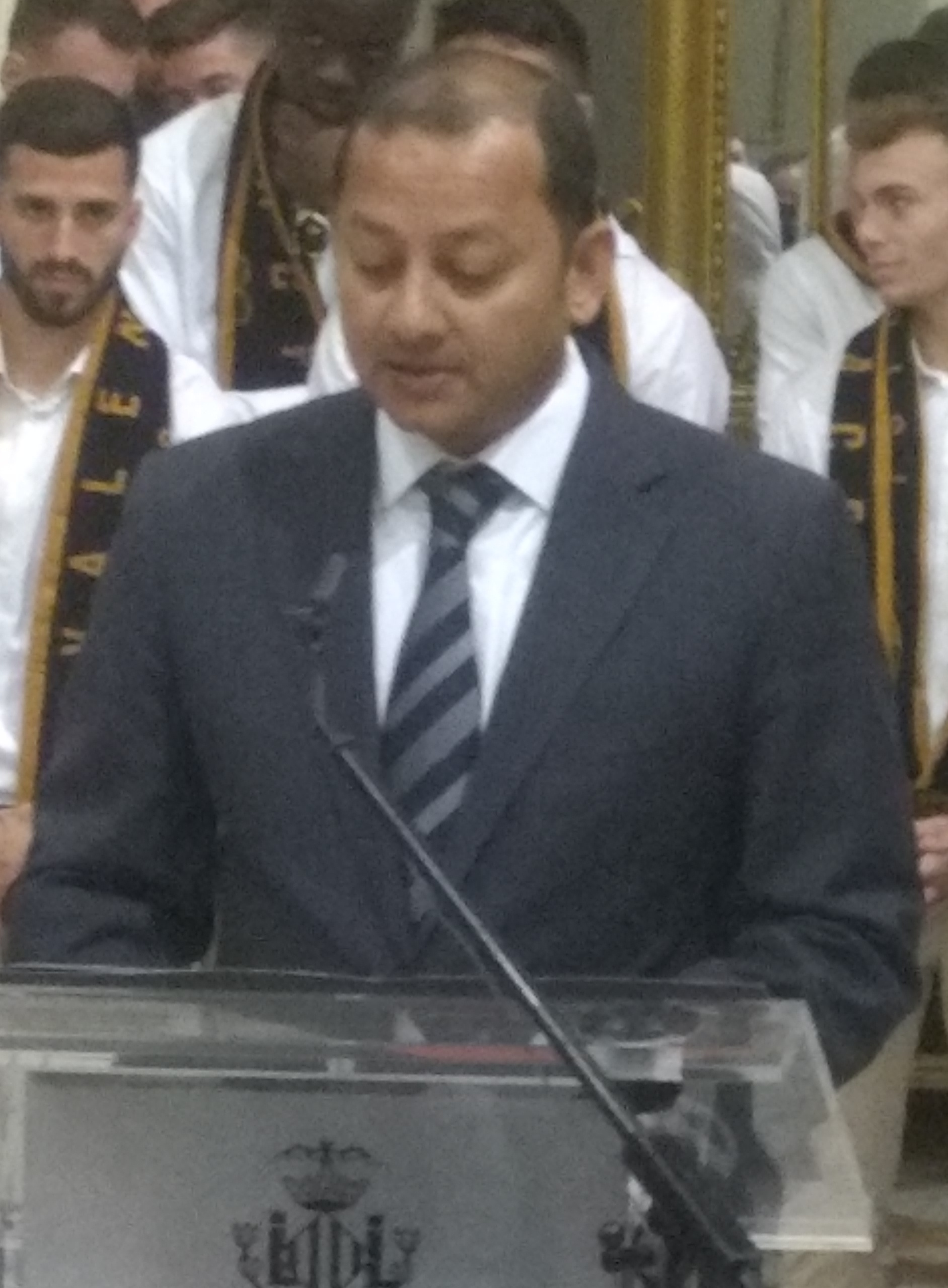
Murthy marking Valencia's win in the 2019 Copa del Rey final

Anil Kumar Murthy (born 19 March 1973) is a Singaporean diplomat and sports executive. He was president of Spanish football club Valencia CF in La Liga from 2017 to 2022, under compatriot owner Peter Lim.

Under Murthy's administration, Valencia celebrated their centenary, won the Copa del Rey and returned to the UEFA Champions League in 2019, but fans and players were unhappy with the sacking of manager Marcelino. He proposed a new model for the Nou Mestalla stadium, and confronted the Curva Nord supporters' group. He left in May 2022, after the newspaper Super Deporte leaked several controversial audio messages.

== Biography ==
Murthy graduated with a degree in electrical and mechanical engineering from Paris, and a master's degree from INSEAD Business School. He went into the Ministry of Foreign Affairs as deputy chief of mission to Paris and permanent delegate to UNESCO for four years.

In April 2017, Singaporean businessman Peter Lim made a change at Valencia CF, the La Liga football club he had owned since 2014, by replacing president Lay Hoon Chan with Murthy, effective from July. Murthy had been an executive consultant at the club since the previous November.

Valencia won the Copa del Rey on 25 May 2019, beating FC Barcelona, but manager Marcelino was sacked in September. Murthy rejected Marcelino's claim that he was dismissed for putting resources into winning the cup instead of the league. It was reported that the players were not speaking to Murthy and vice versa, out of their support for Marcelino.

In November 2019, director of football Mateu Alemany was fired; he later said that he had received no reason from Lim or Murthy. Murthy took over his role and proposed a change in the club's statutes so he could be paid up to €2.7 million for the role, given that board members could not be paid under the club's constitution.

During Valencia's centenary in 2019, Murthy proposed remodelling the Nou Mestalla stadium, which had been half-finished for 10 years after €125 million investment. He said that the initial model was of an Olympic stadium and needed to be modernised for football. In December 2021, he proposed a new plan to President of the Valencian Government Ximo Puig: a three-tiered ground holding 43-50,000 with expansion possibility to 60,000, smaller than the 2009 plan.

Valencia's administration were in a dispute with the Curva Nord supporters' group, who wanted more tickets for the 2019 final. The group ceased their cheering activities and insulted Murthy online, who responded by saying he would suppress them and called them the English insult "twats". A new group "La Curva de Mestalla 1919" returned in July 2022 after Murthy's exit.

In 2021, Murthy surpassed Manuel Llorente as the president of Valencia in service for the longest duration in the 21st century. It was noted that part of his mandate had no crowds due to the COVID-19 pandemic.

In May 2022, audio messages of Murthy were leaked by Valencian sporting newspaper Super Deporte, in which he called Liverpool and Newcastle upon Tyne "shit cities" and was interpreted as calling Lim an amateur. He also said he would run a smear campaign against players Carlos Soler and José Gayà should they leave. Murthy said he was misinterpreted and had called Lim un aficionado, which can mean a fan as well as an amateur in Spanish. He said that his point about the English cities was how they have passionate football support without the favourable weather of Valencia. He said that he had resigned, in response to numerous headlines saying he had been dismissed.
