= Javier Gómez (sports manager) =

Spanish businessman and sports leader

President of Valencia CF
- In office 5 June 2009 – 7 June 2009
- Preceded by: Vicente Soriano
- Succeeded by: Manuel Llorente

Personal details
- Born: Javier Gómez Molina; 1967 (age 57–58); Valencia, Spain

Javier Gómez Molina (born 1967) is a Spanish businessman and sports leader, who served as the president of Valencia CF for 48 hours in June 2009, and as the Corporate General Manager of La Liga between 2013 and 2019, and again since 2021.

== Education ==
Born in Valencia in 1967, Gómez attended the University of Valencia, where he obtained a degree in Business Administration, and the Valencia College of Economists, where he obtained a Master's degree in Taxation. He also took various courses about economic and financial matters and has extensive training in preparing for public examinations.

== Sporting career ==
On 28 April 1999, Javier Gómez Molina joined Valencia CF, where he quickly rose through the ranks, holding every possible position within the club's management structure, such as financial director for the first nine years, until 25 July 2008, when he was appointed to General Manager by the club's president, Vicente Soriano, with whom he reached consensus on all decisions from the start. The following year, on 4 March 2009, Soriano forsook his day-to-day power after failing to find a viability for the club, which allowed Gómez to become Valencia's new strongman and CEO, presenting his viability plan on 11 March. On 5 June, he became the club's temporary president after Soriano presented his irrevocable resignation. Gómez only held this position for 48 hours during the transition of power between Soriano and Manuel Llorente.

Gómez has been described as a "discreet and hardworking survivor", and a quiet executive who prefers to stay away from the media, being considered by some as a mere "man in a gray suit". He went on to become a key figure in ensuring the club's viability, which was finally achieved on 12 December 2011, when a definitive agreement to provide Valencia with a serious and lasting viability plan was reached by Llorente and the Bankia managers. The previous year, Gómez expressed to Llorente his desire to leave the club to pursue other professional activities, but he ultimately decided not to do so, either because he had committed to staying until the club had secured its viability plan, or because he was the only executive that had the trust of Castellón businessman Eugenio Calabuig, whose companies granted Valencia a €50 million loan in mid-2011. Once the viability plan was secured, Gómez resumed his desire to leave, and this time he succeeded, leaving the club's executive board on 31 December 2011, albeit he continued to serve on the club's board of directors as its vice-president, an unpaid position with an expiration date. Having decided to set up his own business as a financial advisor and football agent, he left the vice-presidency on 31 January 2012, thus putting an end to his 13-year stint at Valencia, taking advantage of his last few days there to improve his contacts list.

Once he embarked on his solo career, Gómez was logistically supported by VOS Marketing, a young Valencian company founded by the journalist Víctor Oñate, a former marketing director of Valencia CF, where he had worked alongside Gómez.

=== La Liga ===
In 2013, Gómez was named the Corporate General Manager of La Liga, a position that he still holds (except for a brief period in 2019–21), which means that he was Javier Tebas's right-hand man for over a decade, ensuring that financial fair play was upheld by the clubs of the First and Segunda División. Under his leadership, La Liga implemented Economic Control in 2013, a self-regulation system that practically zeroed both the club's debts with the Public Administration and the players' complaints for non-payment, which combined for nearly 1 billion euros. In February 2018, he opened the World Football Summit Industry in Bilbao, a conference that assembled several relevant figures related to the major industry surrounding football.

== Personal life ==
Despite living in Madrid, Gómez visits his family in Valencia every weekend.
