= Javier Gómez =

Javier Gómez may refer to:

- Francisco Javier Gómez Noya (born 1983), Galician triathlete
- Javier Gómez Cifuentes (born 1981), or Rubio, Spanish footballer
- Javier Gómez Darmendrail (born 1949), Spanish politician with the People's Party
- Javier Gómez Fuertes (born 1986), Spanish gymnast
- Javier Gómez (actor) (born 1960), Argentine television actor
- Javier Gómez (cyclist) (born 1991), Colombian cyclist
- Javier Gómez (sports manager) (born 1967), Spanish businessman and sports leader

== See also ==
- Javier Gómez-Navarro (1945-2024), Spanish politician
