= Valencia CF =

Association football club in Spain

Valencia
- Full name: Valencia Club de Fútbol, S. A. D.
- Nicknames: Ches; Blanquinegros (The Black and Whites); Murciélagos (The Bats); Valencianistas (supporters)
- Short name: Valencia, VCF, VAL
- Founded: 18 March 1919; 107 years ago (as Valencia Foot-ball Club)
- Stadium: Mestalla
- Capacity: 49,430
- Owner: Peter Lim
- President: Kiat Lim
- Head coach: Javier Aguirre
- League: La Liga
- 2025–26: La Liga, 9th of 20
- Website: valenciacf.com
Home colours	Away colours	Third colours

Valencia Club de Fútbol, S. A. D. (Spanish: [baˈlenθja ˈkluβ ðe ˈfuðβol]; Valencian: València Club de Futbol [vaˈlensi.a ˈklub de fubˈbɔl]), commonly known as Valencia CF or simply Valencia, is a Spanish professional football club based in Valencia. The team currently competes in La Liga, the highest tier of the Spanish league system. In the all-time ranking of Spanish football, the club holds fifth place, having previously ranked third until 2016 and fourth until 2025. Valencia has also played in 91 of the 95 seasons of the top division in Spain. Founded in 1919, the club has played its home matches at Mestalla, which has a capacity of 49,430 spectators, since its opening in 1923. The club is expected to move to the new stadium, Nou Mestalla, in 2027, which will have a capacity of 70,044 spectators.

Valencia has won six La Liga titles and finished as runners-up six times, as well two Segunda División titles, eight Copa del Rey trophies, one Spanish Super Cup, and one Copa Eva Duarte. In European competitions, they have won two Inter-Cities Fairs Cups, one UEFA Cup, one UEFA Cup Winners' Cup, two UEFA Super Cups, and one UEFA Intertoto Cup. They have also reached two consecutive UEFA Champions League Finals in 2000 and 2001. The club was champion of the Small Club World Cup in 1966, and runner-up in 1955, despite not having FIFA world title recognition, and fourth in the Latin Cup of 1953. In 2004, the IFFHS named Valencia World's Best Club. Valencia were also members of the G-14 group of leading European football clubs and since its end has been part of the original members of the European Club Association.

Five former members of the club have been inducted into the FIFA International Football Hall of Fame, a project dedicated to preserving the memory of important figures in football history. These include Alfredo Di Stéfano, Mario Alberto Kempes, Romário, Jorge Valdano and Didier Deschamps. Valencia also has four personalities in the FIFA 100, its induction taking place in 2004 as part of the centenary celebrations of FIFA's creation. The ches club is the team with the most Zarra Trophy winners (5), the fourth in the Zamora Trophy (9) and fifth in the Pichichi Trophy (6) at the national level, at the international level it's the third Spanish team with the most FIFA World Player nominees (9) and the fourth in the Ballon d'Or (23), it has ten nominations for the Golden Boy Award, one for the 2019 Kopa Trophy with Lee Kang-in and one for the 2024 Yashin Trophy with Giorgi Mamardashvili. It has been included three times in the UEFA Team of the Year, with Santiago Cañizares and Kily González in 2001 and David Villa in 2010, the last repeating in the FIFPro World XI in the same year.

Four Valencia players were part of the Spanish national team that won the 2010 FIFA World Cup: David Villa, who won the Silver Boot as the second-highest scorer, tied with Thomas Müller on five goals and the Bronze Ball as the third best player in the final phase of the championship, Carlos Marchena, David Silva and Juan Mata. In addition, Raúl Albiol, who came up through the youth ranks, was also part of the world champion team. In 2026, three footballers who came through the Valencia youth system were part of the squad that won the World Cup. Ferran Torres, a youth player since the age of seven and later a member of the first team, was one of the stars of the tournament, scoring the goal that gave Spain the title in the final against Argentina. Alejandro Grimaldo, who came through the youth ranks up to the cadet level, and Borja Iglesias, who spent time at the academy during his youth career, completed the Valencia youth representation in the two-time world champions. Seven of its members have managed to win Olympic Games medals throughout its history: David Albelda and Miguel Ángel Angulo, silver in Sydney 2000; Fabián Ayala, gold in Athens 2004; Éver Banega, gold in Beijing 2008; Carlos Soler, silver in Tokyo 2020; Cristhian Mosquera and Diego López, gold in Paris 2024.

The club maintains a youth academy, known as "Acadèmia". Products of the academy include players such as Miguel Tendillo, Ricardo Arias, Fernando Gómez, Andrés Palop, Javier Farinos, Raúl Albiol, David Albelda, Vicente Rodríguez, Gaizka Mendieta and David Silva. Current stars of the game to have graduated in recent years include Isco, Jordi Alba, Paco Alcácer, Juan Bernat, José Gayà, Carlos Soler, Ferran Torres, Lee Kang-in, Cristhian Mosquera, and Javi Guerra. Historically one of the biggest clubs in the world in terms of number of associates (registered paying supporters), with around 50,000 season ticket holders at their peak, the club began to decline in the mid-2010s. Singaporean billionaire Peter Lim acquired the team in 2014.

== History ==
The club was established on 5 March 1919 and officially approved on 18 March 1919, with Octavio Augusto Milego Díaz as its first president; incidentally, the presidency was decided by a coin toss. The club played its first competitive match away from home on 21 May 1919 against Valencia Gimnástico, and lost the match 1–0.

Valencia moved into the Mestalla Stadium in 1923, having played its home matches at the Algirós ground since 7 December 1919. The first match at Mestalla pitted the home side against Castellón Castalia and ended in a 0–0 draw. In another match the day after, Valencia won 1–0 against the same opposition. Valencia CF won the Regional Championship in 1923, and was eligible to play in the domestic Copa del Rey cup competition for the first time in its history.

=== 1940s: Emergence as a giant in Spanish football ===
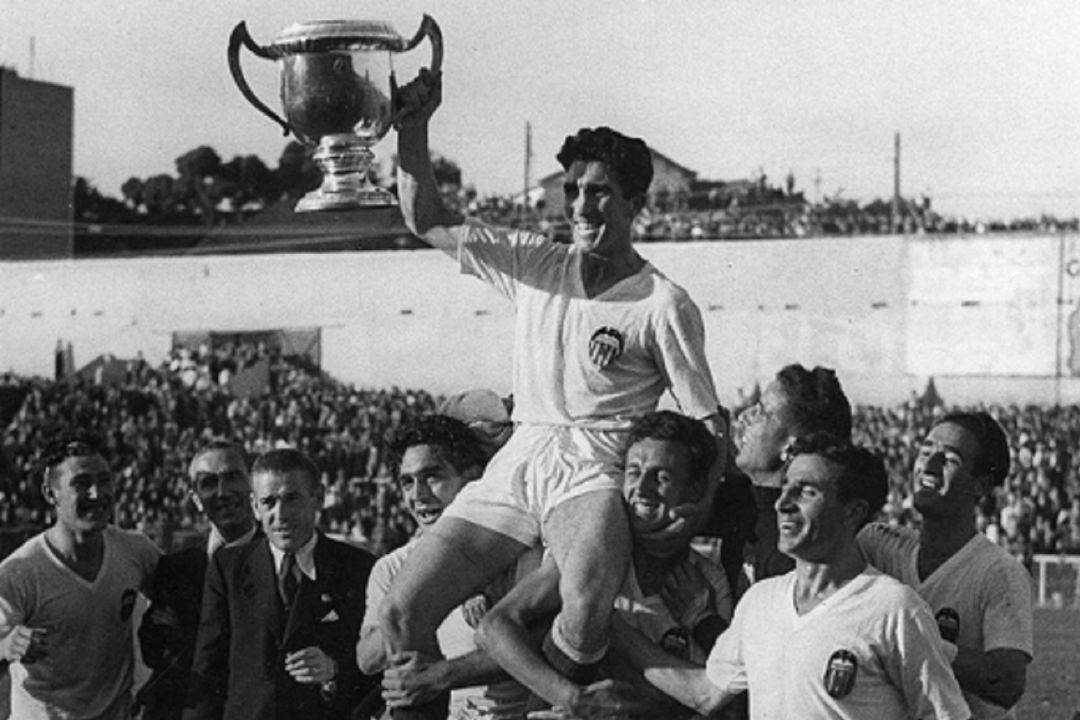
Players of Valencia celebrating after having won the 1941 Copa del Rey final

The Spanish Civil War halted the progress of the Valencia team until 1941, when it won the Copa del Rey, beating RCD Espanyol in the final. In the 1941–42 season, the club won its first Spanish La Liga championship title, although winning the Copa del Rey was more reputable than the championship at that time. The club maintained its consistency to capture the league title again in the 1943–44 season, as well as the 1946–47 league edition. They would conclude their decade of success by winning the 1949 Copa del Rey; this meant Valencia ended the decade with a record of three La Liga and two Copa del Rey titles. This success would help cement the club's name in Spanish football.

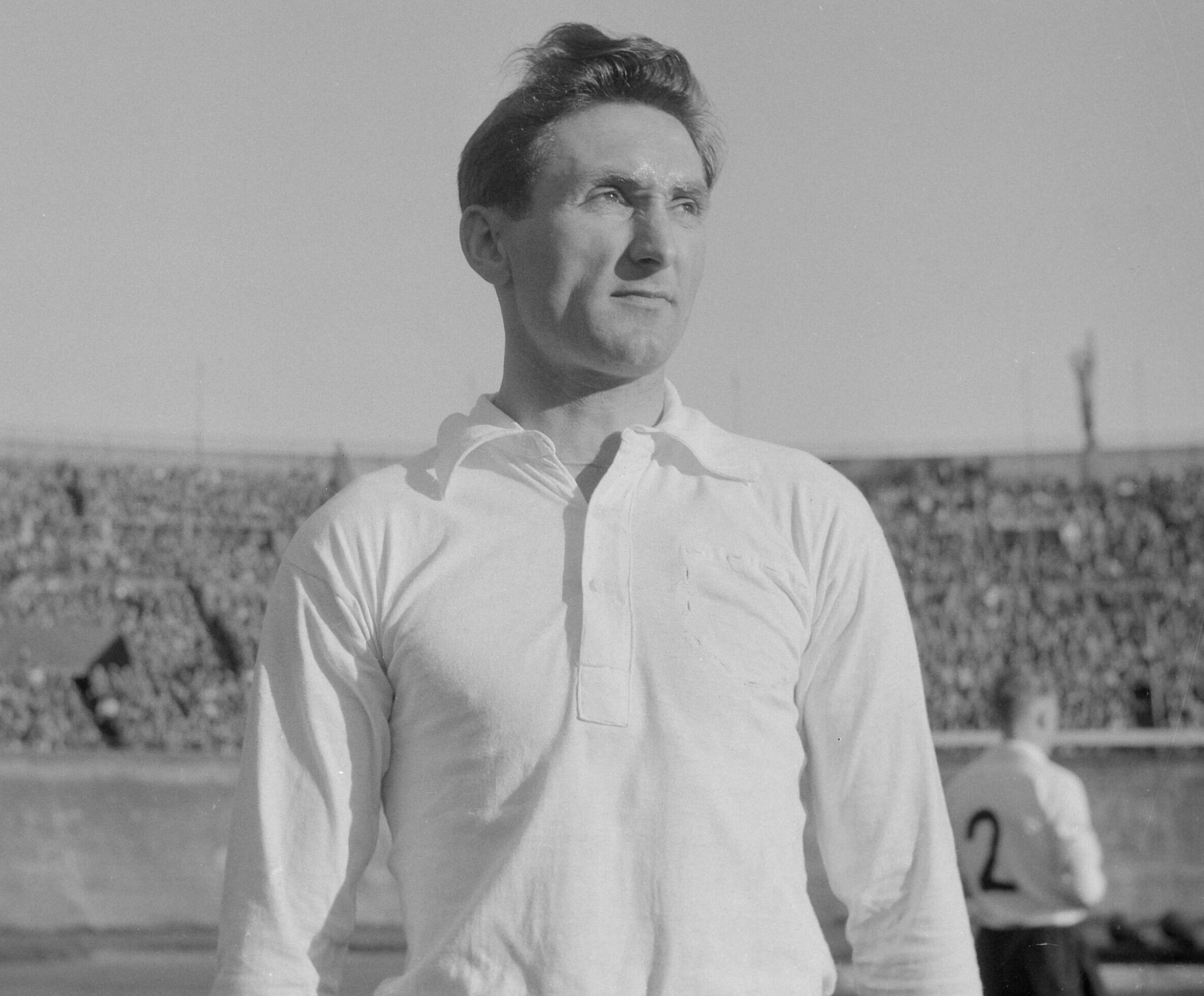
Faas Wilkes in 1955

In the 1950s, Valencia failed to emulate the success of the previous decade, even though it grew as a club. A restructuring of Mestalla resulted in an increase in spectator capacity to 45,000, while the club had a number of Spanish and foreign stars. Players such as Spanish international Antonio Puchades and Dutch forward Faas Wilkes graced the pitch at Mestalla. In the 1952–53 season, the club finished as runners-up in La Liga, and in the following season, won the Copa del Rey, then known as the Copa del Generalísimo.

=== 1960s: European successes in the Fairs Cup ===
While managing average league form in the early 1960s, Valencia had its first European success in the form of the Inter-Cities Fairs Cup (the forerunner to the UEFA Cup), defeating Barcelona in the final of the 1961–62 edition. The following edition of the tournament pitted Valencia against Croatian club Dinamo Zagreb in the final, which the Spanish side also won. Valencia reached a third consecutive Inter-Cities Fairs Cup final in the following season, but this time were defeated 2–1 by fellow Spanish club Zaragoza.

In the 1963–64 final, Valencia lost 2–1 on aggregate to Real Zaragoza at Camp Nou.

=== 1970s to early 1980s: More domestic and European glory ===
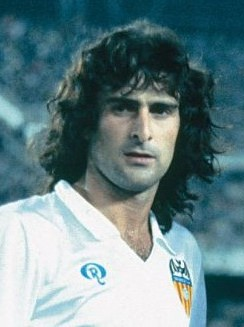
Mario Kempes in 1982

Former two-time European Footballer of the Year award winner Alfredo Di Stéfano was hired as Valencia coach in 1970, and immediately inspired his new club to their fourth La Liga championship and first since 1947. This secured Valencia its first qualification for the prestigious European Cup, contested by the various European domestic champions. Valencia reached the third round of the 1971–72 competition before losing both legs to Hungarian champions Újpesti Dózsa. In 1972 the club also finished runners-up both in La Liga and the domestic cup, losing to Real Madrid and Atlético Madrid, respectively. The most notable players of the 1970s era include Austrian midfielder Kurt Jara, forward Johnny Rep of the Netherlands and Argentinian forward Mario Kempes, who was consecutively La Liga top scorer in 1976–77 and 1977–78. Valencia would go on to win the Copa del Rey again in the 1978–79 season, and also capture the European Cup Winners' Cup the next season, after beating English club Arsenal in the final, and the European Super Cup against Nottingham Forest thanks to the away goals rule, with Kempes spearheading their success in Europe.

=== Mid to late 1980s: Stagnation and relegation ===
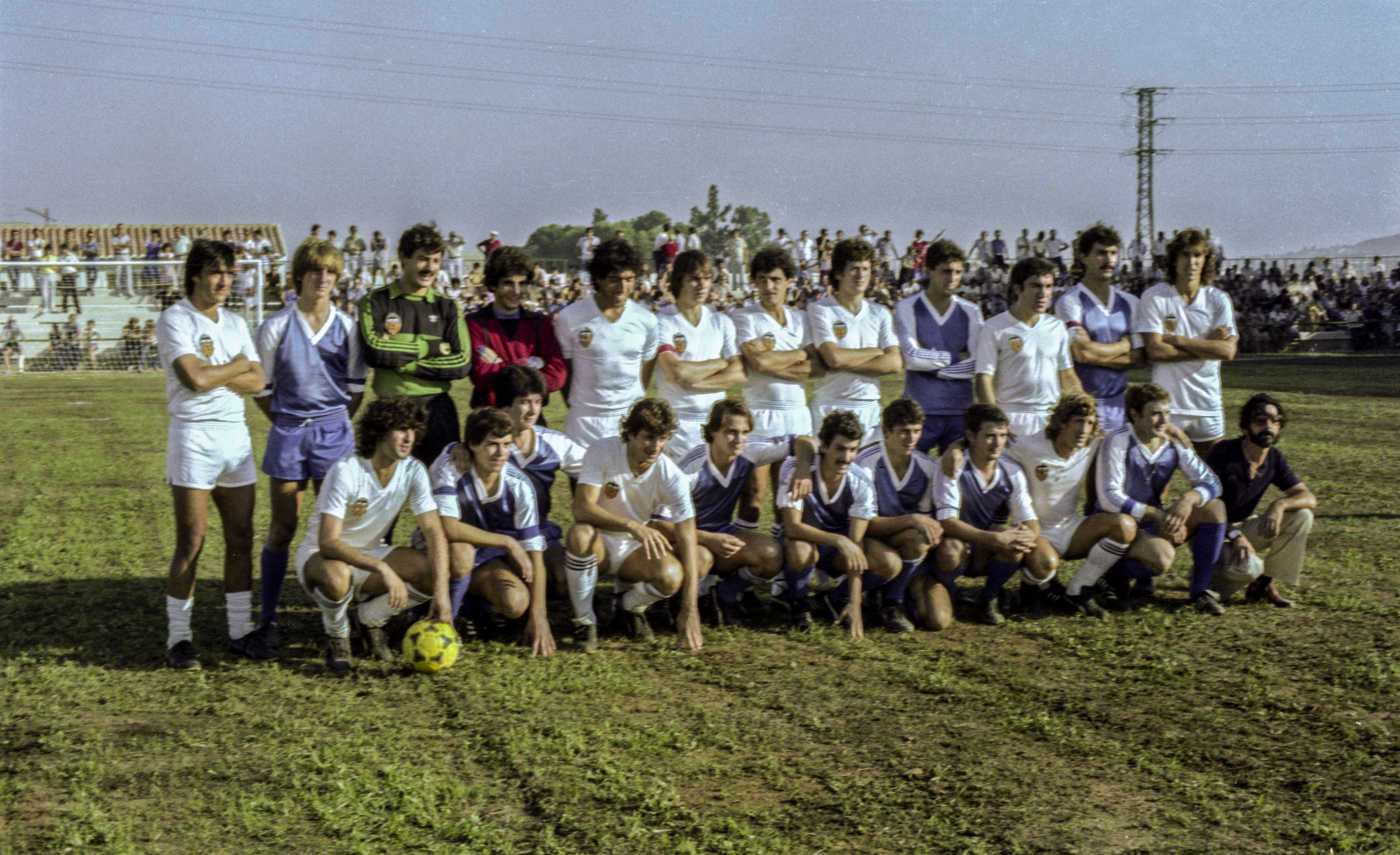
Line-up in a friendly match in Alginet, August 1980. Up: Felman, Manzanedo, Orlando Giménez, Cerveró, Vilarrodà, Subirats, Carrete, and Arias. Down: Kempes, Morena, and Sol.

In 1982, the club appointed Miljan Miljanić as coach. After a disappointing season, Valencia was in 17th place and faced relegation with seven games left to play. Koldo Aguirre replaced Miljanić as coach, and Valencia barely avoided relegation that year, relying on favorable results from other teams to ensure their own survival. In the 1983–84 and 1984–85 seasons, the club was heavily in debt under the presidency of Vicente Tormo. The club finally hit rock bottom when it was relegated at the end of the 1985–86 season, and riven with internal problems such as unpaid player and staff wages, as well as poor morale. The club was relegated for the first time after 55 years in Spanish top-flight football.

Arturo Tuzón was named the new club president, and he helped steer Valencia back to La Liga. Alfredo Di Stéfano returned as coach in 1986 and Valencia won promotion again following the 1986–87 season. Di Stéfano stayed on as coach until the 1987–88 season, when the team finished in 14th position in La Liga. Bulgarian forward Luboslav Penev joined the club in 1989, as Valencia aimed to consolidate their place in La Liga. In the 1988–89 La Liga season, Valencia finished third, which would signal their competitiveness going into the 1990s.

=== 1990s: Re-emergence ===
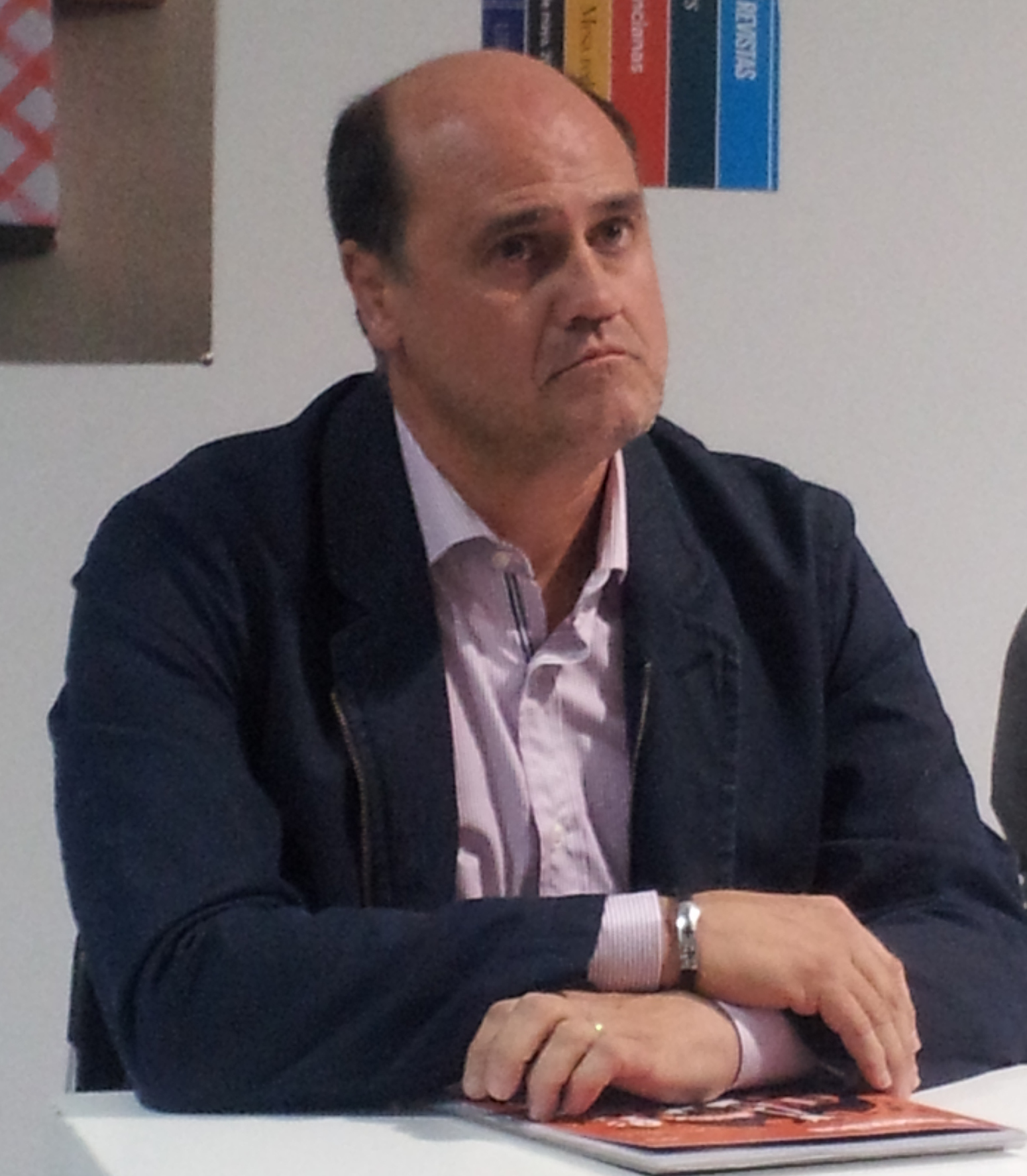
Fernando Gómez Colomer is the player with the most appearances for the club with 556

In the 1989–90 La Liga season, Valencia finished as runners-up to Real Madrid, and thus qualified for the UEFA Cup.

Guus Hiddink was appointed as head coach in the 1991–92 season, and the club finished fourth in the League and reached the quarter-finals of the Copa del Rey. In 1992, Valencia officially became a Sporting Limited Company, and retained Hiddink as their coach until 1993.

Brazilian coach Carlos Alberto Parreira, fresh from winning the 1994 FIFA World Cup with the Brazil national team, became manager at Mestalla in 1994. Parreira immediately signed Spanish goalkeeper Andoni Zubizarreta, Russian forward Oleg Salenko, and Predrag Mijatović, but failed to produce results expected of him. He was replaced by new coach José Manuel Rielo. The club's earlier successes continued to elude it, although it was not short of top coaching staff like Luis Aragonés and Jorge Valdano, as well as foreign star forwards like Brazilian Romário, Claudio López, Ariel Ortega from Argentina, and Adrian Ilie from Romania. In the 1995–96 La Liga season, Valencia finished second to Atlético Madrid, being unable to capture the title after a close fought race.

Valencia would struggle for the next two seasons, but the 1998–99 La Liga season would signal the start of one of the club's most successful periods in their history; they lifted their first trophy in nineteen years by winning the 1998–99 Copa del Rey under Claudio Ranieri, and also qualified for the UEFA Champions League.

=== 2000s: Valencia returns to the top of Spanish and European football ===
Valencia started the 1999–2000 season by winning another title, beating Barcelona in the Spanish Super Cup. Valencia finished third in the league, four points behind champions Deportivo La Coruña, and level on points with second-placed Barça. The biggest success for the club, however, was in the Champions League; for the first time in its history, Valencia reached the European Cup final. However, in the final played in Paris on 24 May 2000, Real Madrid would beat Valencia 3–0.

The final would also be Claudio López's farewell, as he had agreed to sign for Italian side Lazio; also leaving was Farinós for Inter Milan and Gerard for Barcelona. The notable signings of that summer were John Carew, Rubén Baraja, Roberto Ayala, Vicente Rodríguez, and Brazilian left-back Fábio Aurélio. That season Valencia also bought Pablo Aimar in the winter transfer window. Baraja, Aimar, Vicente, and Ayala would soon become a staple of Valencia's dominance of the early 2000s in La Liga.

2000 UEFA Champions League Final starting lineup

Valencia started the championship on the right foot and were top of the league after ten games. After the Christmas break, however, Valencia started to pay for the top demand that such a draining competition like the Champions League requires. After passing the two mini-league phases, Héctor Cúper's team eliminated English sides Arsenal in the quarter-finals and Leeds United in the semi-finals, reaching the final for the second consecutive year. In the final match against Bayern Munich, played in Milan at the San Siro on 23 May, Gaizka Mendieta gave Valencia the lead by scoring from the penalty spot right at the start of the match. Goalkeeper Santiago Cañizares then stopped a penalty from Mehmet Scholl, but Stefan Effenberg drew Bayern level after the break thanks to another penalty. After extra time, the match went to a penalty shoot-out, where a Mauricio Pellegrino miss gave Bayern Champions League glory and dealt Valencia a second-straight defeat in the final. Valencia went on to slip to fifth place in La Liga and out of the Champions League positions for the 2001–02 season. Going into the final league match, Valencia only needed a draw at the Camp Nou against Barcelona to seal Champions League qualification. However, Los Che lost to Barcelona 3–2, with a last minute goal completing a hat-trick from Rivaldo, resulting in Barcelona qualifying for the Champions League ahead of their side.

Valencia president Pedro Cortés resigned for personal reasons and left the club in July, with the satisfaction of overseeing the club win the Copa del Rey and Spanish Super Cup, as well as reaching two successive Champions League finals. Jaime Ortí replaced Cortés as president and expressed his intention of maintaining the good form that had made the club so admired on the European circuit. There were also some changes in the team and staff. Rafael Benítez, after helping Tenerife to promotion, replaced Héctor Cúper after the latter became the new coach at Inter in Italy. Among the playing squad, Gaizka Mendieta, Didier Deschamps, Luis Milla, and Zlatko Zahovič left, while Carlos Marchena, Mista, Curro Torres, Francisco Rufete, Gonzalo de los Santos, and Salva Ballesta all arrived.

From 1999 up until the end of the 2004 season, Valencia had one of their most successful periods in the club's history. With a total of two La Liga titles, a UEFA Cup, a Copa del Rey, and a UEFA Super Cup in those six years, no less than five first class titles and two Champions League finals had been achieved.

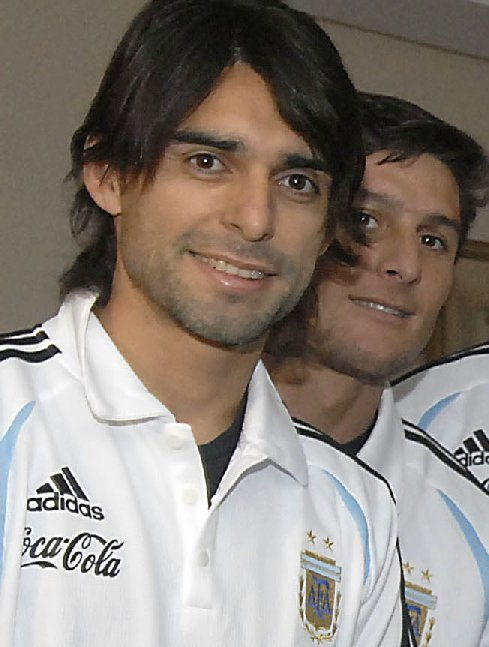
During Valencia's domestic and European dominance of the early 2000s, Argentine Roberto Ayala had been a key component in their defense

That first match against fellow title rivals Real Madrid produced a significant and important victory. This was followed by a record of eleven consecutive wins, breaking their existing record set in the 1970–71 season, which was also the club's La Liga title win under Alfredo Di Stéfano.

After a defeat in A Coruña against Deportivo on 9 December 2001, the team had to overcome Espanyol at the Estadi Olímpic Lluís Companys to avoid further backsliding behind the league leaders. at half-time, Valencia were 2–0 down, but a comeback in the second half saw them win 3–2.

In the second part of the season, Benítez's team suffered a temporary setback after losing 1–0 at the Santiago Bernabéu to Real Madrid, but in the coming six matches they recovered from this defeat and achieved four victories and two draws.

2001 UEFA Champions League Final starting lineup

In one of these crucial games against Espanyol, Valencia were trailing 1–0 at half-time and down a player as well following the dismissal of Carboni. However, after a second half brace from Rubén Baraja, they would achieve a 2–1 comeback win. Furthermore, Real Madrid's defeat at the Anoeta to Real Sociedad left Valencia with a three-point lead at the top of the table.

Valencia's final game of the season was on 5 May 2002 at La Rosaleda against Málaga, a day that has gone down in Valencia's history. The team shut itself away in Benalmádena, close to the scene of the game, in order to gain focus. An early goal from Roberto Ayala and another close to half-time from Fábio Aurélio secured Valencia a fifth La Liga crown, 31 years after their last title win.

The 2002–03 season was a disappointing one for Valencia, as they failed in their attempt to retain the La Liga title and ended up outside of the Champions League spots in fifth, behind Celta Vigo. They were also knocked out in the quarter-finals of the Champions League by Inter Milan on away goals. The 2003–04 season saw Valencia trailing longtime leaders Real Madrid. In February, with 26 matches played, Madrid were eight points clear at the top of the table. However, their form severely declined in the late stage of the season, and consecutive losses in their last five games of the campaign allowed Valencia to overtake them and claim the title, their second in three seasons. The club also added the UEFA Cup to this success, defeating Marseille 2–0 in the final.

In the summer of 2004, manager Benítez decided to depart Valencia, stating he had had problems with the club president; he would soon become head coach of Liverpool. He was replaced by former Valencia coach Claudio Ranieri, who had recently been sacked by Chelsea. Despite lifting the European Super Cup after defeating UEFA Champions League winners Porto, his second reign at the club was a disappointment; Valencia harboured realistic hopes of retaining their La Liga crown but, by February, found themselves in seventh place. Valencia had also been knocked out of the Champions League group phase, with Ranieri being sacked promptly in February. The 2004–05 season ended with Valencia outside of the UEFA Cup spots.

In the summer of 2005, Getafe coach Quique Flores was appointed as the new manager of Valencia and ended the season in third place, which in turn gained Valencia a place in the Champions League after a season away from the competition. The 2006–07 season was one with many difficulties; a campaign which started with realistic hopes of challenging for the title was disrupted with a huge list of injuries to key players, as well as internal arguments between Flores and new sporting director Amedeo Carboni. Valencia ended the season in fourth place and were knocked out of the Champions League in the quarter-finals by Chelsea 3–2 on aggregate, after they had knocked out Italian champions Inter in the second round. In the summer of 2007, the internal fight between Flores and Carboni was settled, with Carboni being replaced by Ángel Ruiz as the new sporting director of Valencia.

On 29 October 2007, the Valencia board of directors fired Flores after a string of disappointing performances, and caretaker manager Óscar Fernández took over on a temporary basis until a full-time manager was found, rumoured to be either Marcello Lippi or José Mourinho. A day later, Dutch manager Ronald Koeman announced he would be leaving PSV Eindhoven to sign for Valencia. However, Koeman's appointment failed to lead to improvement; in fact, Valencia even went on to drop to the 15th position in the league, just two points above the relegation zone. Despite their poor league form, Valencia would still go on to lift the Copa del Rey on 16 April 2008, following a 3–1 victory over Getafe at the Vicente Calderón. This was the club's seventh Copa title. Five days later, one day after a devastating 5–1 league defeat in Bilbao, Valencia fired Koeman and replaced him with Voro, who would guide Valencia as caretaker manager for the remainder of the season. He went on to win the first match since the sacking of Koeman, beating Osasuna 3–0. Voro would eventually drag Valencia from the relegation battle to a safe mid-table finish of tenth place, finally ending a disastrous league campaign for Los Che.

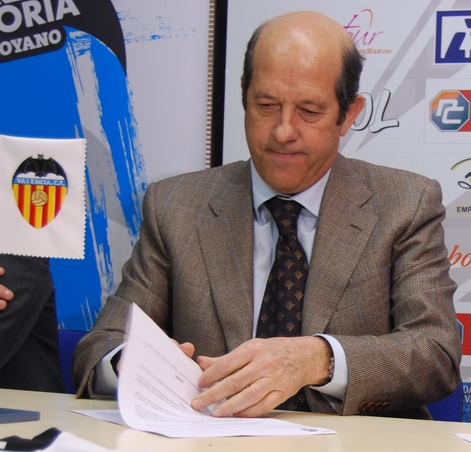
35th president of Valencia Manuel Llorente

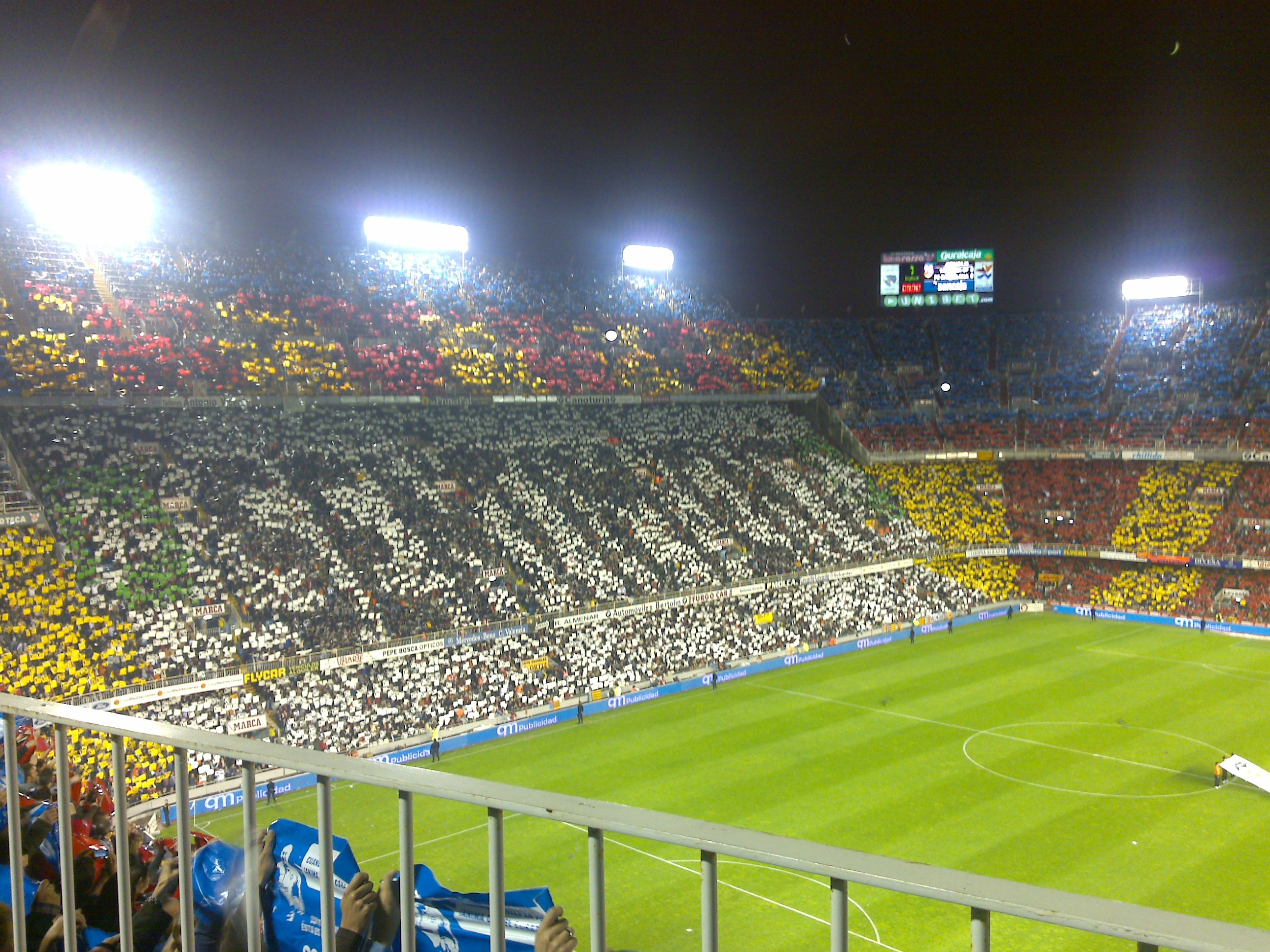
Tifo at Mestalla Stadium

Highly rated Unai Emery was announced as the new head coach of Valencia on 22 May 2008. The start of the young manager's career looked to be promising, with the club winning four out of its first five games, a surge that saw the team rise to the top position of the La Liga table. Despite looking impressive in Europe, Los Che then hit a poor run of form in the league that saw them dip as low as seventh in the standings. Amid the slump emerged reports of a massive internal debt at the club exceeding 400 million euros, as well as that the players had been unpaid for weeks. The team's problems were compounded when they were knocked out of the UEFA Cup by Dynamo Kyiv on away goals. After a run where Valencia took only five points from ten games in La Liga, an announcement was made that the club had secured a loan that would cover the players' expenses until the end of the year. This announcement coincided with an upturn in form, and the club won six of its next eight games to surge back into the critical fourth place Champions' League spot. However, Los Che were then pushed down to sixth place in the league following defeats to top four rivals Atlético Madrid and Villarreal in two of their final three games, meaning they failed to qualify for the Champions League for a second successive season.

=== 2010–2014: Debt issues and stability ===
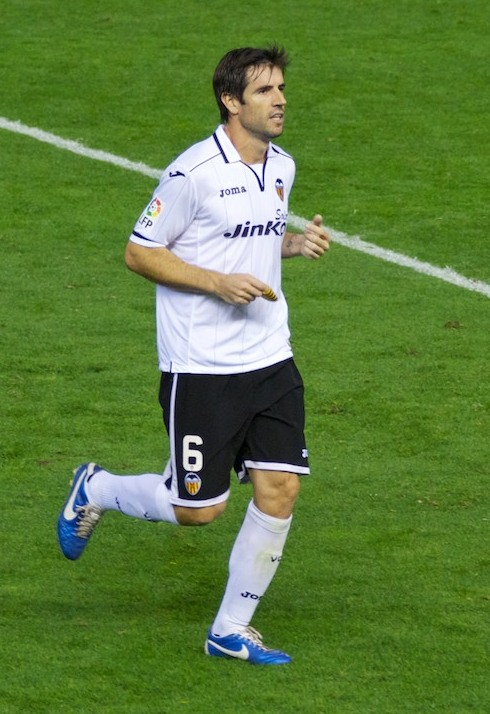
Over the course of 15 seasons and 481 official matches from 1997 to 2013, as well as serving as team captain, defensive midfielder David Albelda became one of the most recognisable players of Valencia CF.

No solution had yet been found to address the massive debt Valencia was faced with, and rumors persisted that top talents such as David Villa, Juan Mata, and David Silva could leave the club to help balance the books. In the first season of the new decade, Valencia returned to the Champions League for the first time since the 2007–08 campaign, as they finished comfortably in third place in the 2009–10 La Liga standings. However, in the summer of 2010, due to financial reasons, David Villa and David Silva were sold to Barcelona and Manchester City, respectively, to reduce the club's massive debt. Despite the loss of two of the club's most important players, the team was able to finish comfortably in third place again in the 2010–11 La Liga for the second season running, although they would be eliminated from the Champions League by German side Schalke 04 in the round of 16. In the summer of 2011, then-captain Juan Mata was sold to Chelsea to further help Valencia's precarious financial situation. It was announced by club president Manuel Llorente that the club's debt had been decreased and that the work on the new stadium would restart as soon as possible, sometime in 2012.

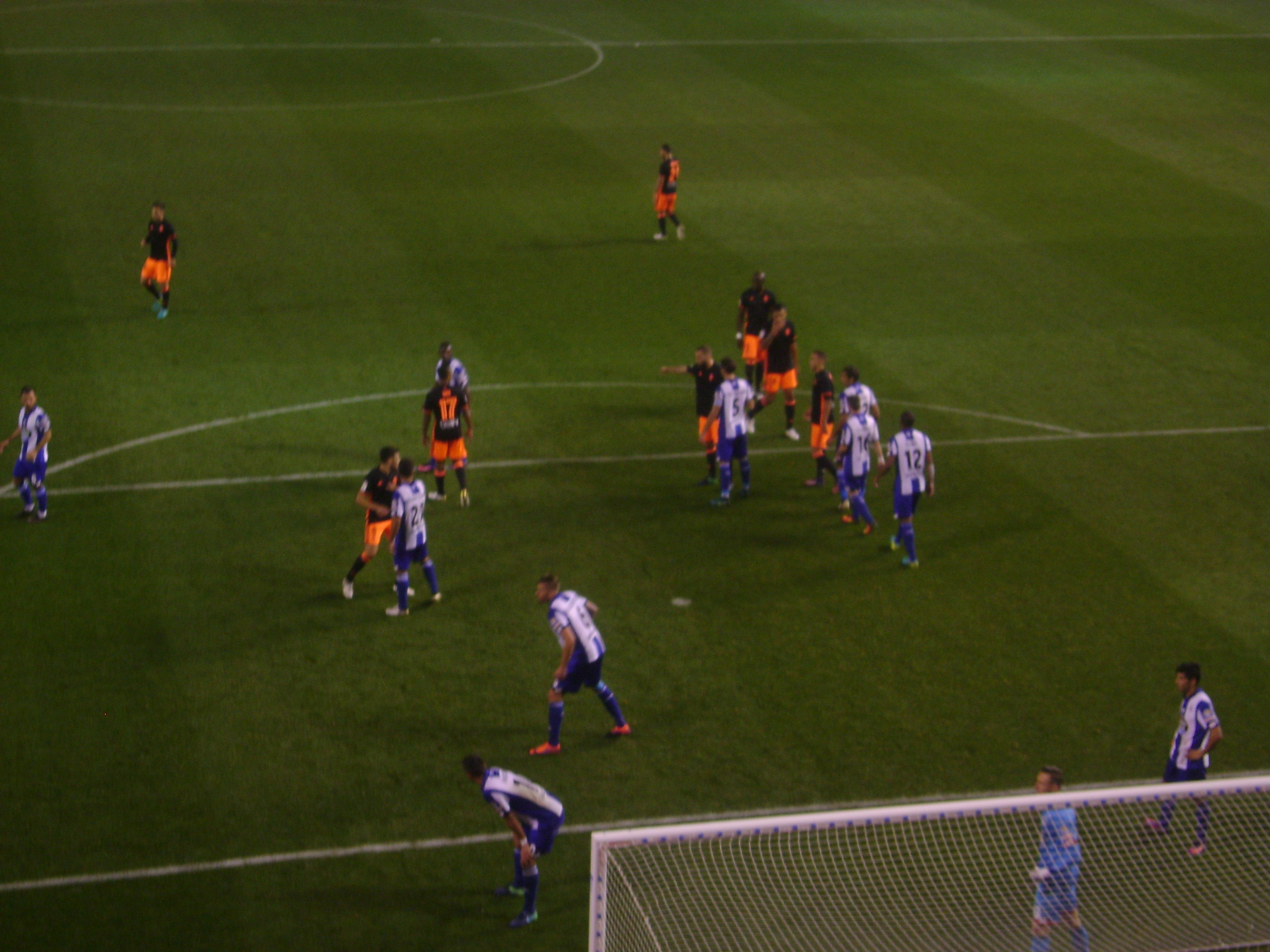
Deportivo de La Coruña vs. Valencia CF.

During the 2012–13 season, Ernesto Valverde was announced as the new manager, but after failing to qualify for the Champions League, he stepped down and was replaced by Miroslav Đukić. On 5 July 2013, Amadeo Salvo was named as the new president of the club. Almost a month after Salvo was named president, on 1 August, Valencia sold star striker Roberto Soldado to English club Tottenham Hotspur for a reported fee of €30 million. Đukić was sacked six months into the 2013–14 season after just six wins in his first sixteen matches, Valencia's worst start to a season in fifteen years. He was replaced by Juan Antonio Pizzi on 26 December 2013. Under Pizzi, Valencia reached the semi-finals of the UEFA Europa League, where they lost to eventual winners Sevilla on away goals, and finished eighth in La Liga despite a disastrous start to the season.

=== 2014–present: Decline under Peter Lim's ownership ===
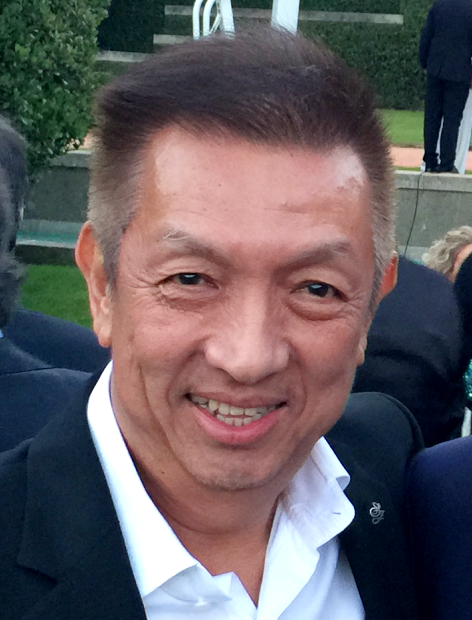
Peter Lim has owned Valencia since 2014

In May 2014, Singaporean businessman Peter Lim was designated by the Fundación Valencia CF as the buyer of 70.4% of the shares owned by the club's foundation. After months of negotiations between Lim and Bankia (the main creditor of the club), an agreement was reached in August 2014. Juan Antonio Pizzi was unexpectedly sacked as head coach and replaced by Nuno Espírito Santo on 2 July 2014. Later, Salvo revealed in an interview that hiring Nuno was one of the conditions Lim had insisted on when buying the club. This raised eyebrows in the media because of Nuno's close relationship with the football agent Jorge Mendes, whose first-ever client was Nuno. Lim and Mendes were also close friends and business partners. Regardless, Nuno's first season was a successful one. Notable signings included Álvaro Negredo, André Gomes and Enzo Pérez, who had just won the Player of the Year in the Portuguese Primeira Liga. Valencia finished the 2014–15 season in fourth place, achieving Champions League qualification with 77 points, just one point ahead of Sevilla after a dramatic final week where they defeated Granada 4–0.

On 2 July 2015, Amadeo Salvo resigned from his post as the executive president of Valencia, citing personal reasons. He was a popular figure among the fans. On 10 August 2015, Nicolás Otamendi was sold to Manchester City for £32 million and Aymen Abdennour was signed from Monaco for £22 million as his replacement. Valencia defeated Monaco in the Champions League play-off round with a 4–3 aggregate victory. However, Valencia had a poor start to the 2015–16 league season, winning only five out of thirteen matches and failing to progress from the Champions League group stage. The fans were also increasingly concerned about the growing influence of Jorge Mendes in the club's activities. On 29 November, Nuno resigned as manager and former Manchester United defender Gary Neville was hired as his replacement on 2 December. Valencia went winless for nine matches before earning their first win under Neville in a 2–1 victory at home against Espanyol. On 30 March 2016, Neville was sacked after recording the lowest win percentage in La Liga history for a Valencia manager with minimum of five matches, winning just three out of sixteen games. He was replaced by Pako Ayestarán, who had been brought in by Neville as the assistant coach just one month prior. Ayestarán inherited a side at risk of relegation and won three consecutive league games, beating Sevilla, Barcelona 2–1 at the Camp Nou, and Eibar.. Valencia finished the season in twelfth place, and he was confirmed as full-time head coach on a contract until 2018..

In the summer of 2016, André Gomes and Paco Alcácer were both sold to Barcelona and Shkodran Mustafi was sold to Arsenal, while Ezequiel Garay and former Manchester United player Nani were brought in. Pako Ayestarán was sacked on 21 September 2016 after four straight defeats at the beginning of the 2016–17 season. Former Italy national team head coach Cesare Prandelli was hired as his replacement on 28 September. However, he resigned after just three months on 30 December, claiming the club had made him false transfer promises. Days later, on 7 January 2017, Valencia sporting director Jesús García Pitarch also resigned, saying he felt like he was being used as a shield for criticism by the club and that he could not defend something he no longer believed in. Voro was named caretaker manager for the fifth time until the end of season, with Valencia in 17th position and in danger of relegation. However, results improved under Voro and he steered Valencia clear off relegation, ultimately finishing the season in 12th place. On 27 March, Mateu Alemany was named the new director general of Valencia.

Chart of Valencia CF league performance 1929–present

The club also announced club president Lay Hoon Chan had submitted her resignation and that she would be replaced by Anil Murthy. After rumors arose of Lim's attempts at selling the club, Murthy assured the fans and local media that Valencia was a long-term project for both him and Lim, and they would not consider selling the club. For the following season, former Villarreal coach Marcelino was named the new manager on 12 May.

After a successful first season under Marcelino, the club secured fourth place in La Liga and a return to the Champions League. In Marcelino's second season, Valencia again finished fourth and also reached the semi-finals of the UEFA Europa League. On 25 May 2019, Valencia won the Copa del Rey, their first trophy since 2008, upsetting league winners Barcelona 2–1 in the final.

Both Marcelino and sporting director Mateu Alemany, who were credited as the architects of this success, were fired on 11 September 2019 after the former publicly criticized Lim. He was replaced by the ultimately unsuccessful Albert Celades, who was sacked due to poor results, while sporting director César Sánchez resigned that same season, making it six different managers and another six sporting directors by 2020.

For the 2020–21 season, manager Javi Gracia was hired. He was put in charge of a team full of prospects and reserves after the club failed to sign any players during the summer transfer window, but sold key players such as captain Dani Parejo. Local wonderkid Ferran Torres was also sold to Manchester City for a price deemed half his market value. Overall, Valencia sold players worth 85 million euros in order to rebalance the club's books. At the beginning of the season, the club was unable to pay the salaries to the remaining players. After six seasons under Peter Lim's ownership, Valencia had accumulated losses of 323 million euros, In the following years, the playing squad was cut significantly in terms of quality and Lim's ownership has faced strong criticism in Valencia.

In the 2021–22 season, José Bordalás was hired as head coach, following his five-season tenure with Getafe. Valencia reached the Copa del Rey final in Bordalás' first season in charge, but lost to Real Betis on penalties following a 1–1 draw.

In June 2022, Anil Murthy left after reportedly insulting the club's owner. Peter Lim's son became club director and Lay Hoon Chan returned as the club president.

On 23 October 2026, Valencia CF announced an agreement for Pitchwise Holdings, an investment consortium led by sports executives Ann Rodriguez and Corey Woolfolk, to acquire a 42% stake in the club from Meriton Holdings. The consortium's investors include George R. Roberts and Henry Kravis, co-founders of Kohlberg Kravis Roberts, as well as Penner Sports Group, the ownership group of the Denver Broncos. The transaction valued Valencia at €1.25 billion on an enterprise-value basis and included a commitment by Pitchwise to provide €100 million in new capital for investment in the club.

Under the agreement, Meriton Holdings would retain majority ownership of Valencia, while Kiat Lim would remain club president. Rodriguez and Woolfolk would join Lim in the club's new ownership structure, which would oversee the planned move to Nou Mestalla. The investment remained subject to customary closing conditions, including regulatory approvals.

== Stadium ==
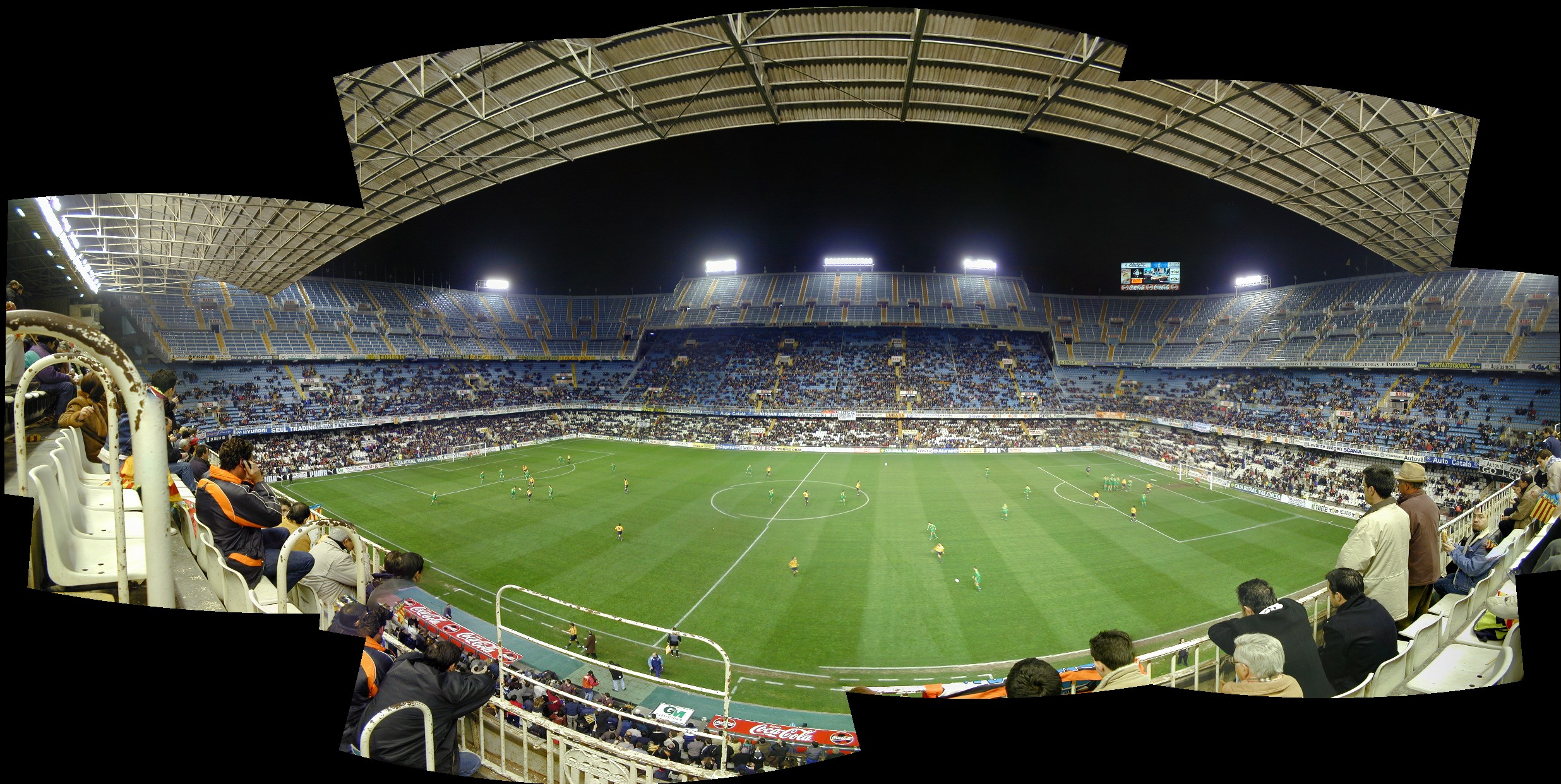
Panoramic of the Mestalla

Valencia played its first years at the Algirós stadium, but moved to the Mestalla in 1923. In the 1950s, the Mestalla was restructured, which resulted in a capacity increase to 45,000 spectators. Today it holds 49,430 seats, making it the fifth largest stadium in Spain. It is also renowned for its steep terracing and for being one of the most intimidating atmospheres in Europe.

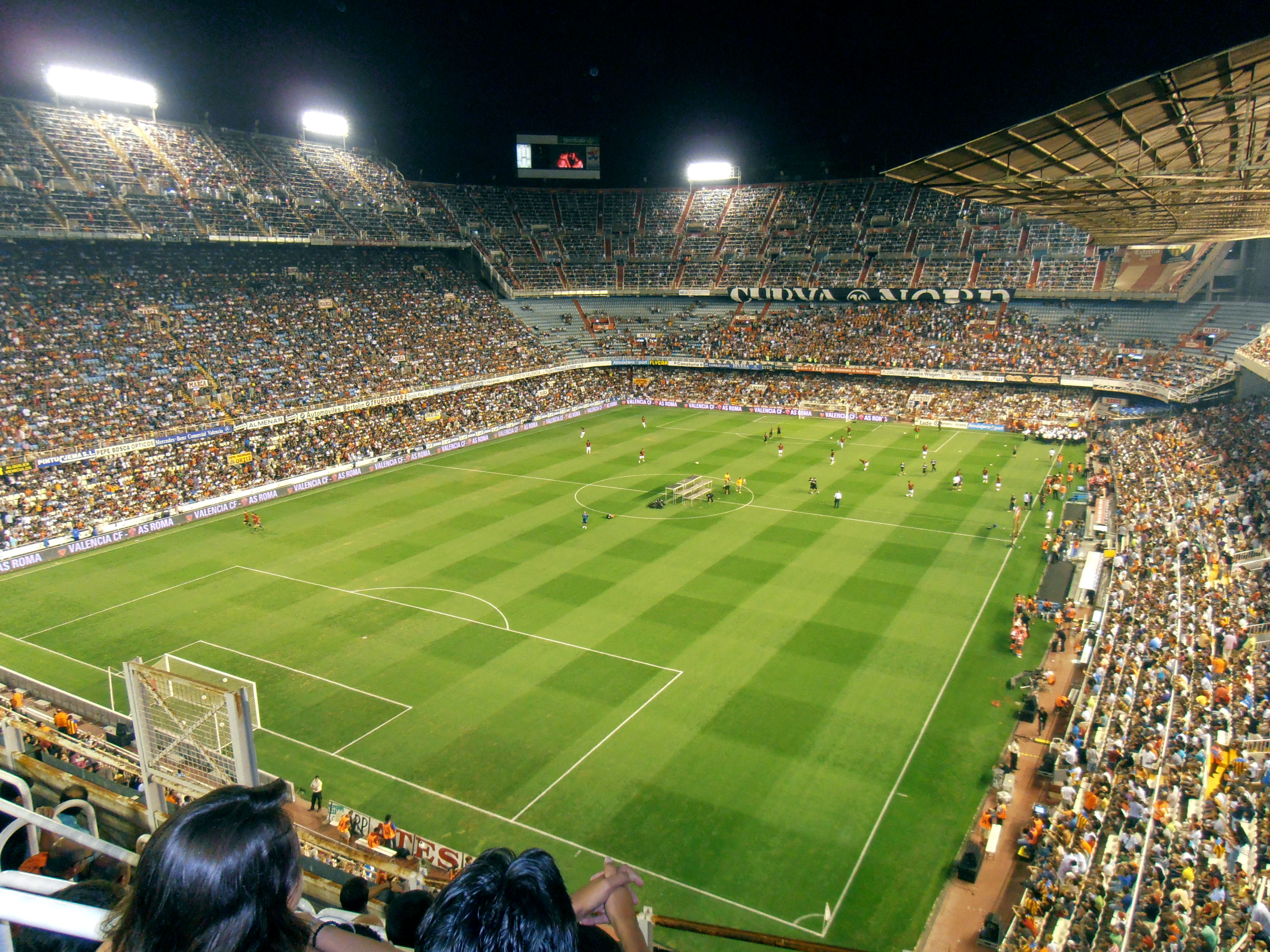
Valencia vs. Roma at the Mestalla in 2011

On 20 May 1923, the Mestalla pitch was inaugurated with a friendly match between Valencia and Levante UD.

A long history has taken place on the Mestalla field since its very beginning, when the Valencia team was not yet in the Primera División. Back then, this stadium could hold 17,000 spectators, and at that time, the club started to show its potential in regional championships, which led the managers of the time to carry out the first alterations of Mestalla in 1927. The stadium's total capacity increased to 25,000 before it became severely damaged during the Civil War; the Mestalla was used as a concentration camp and a junk warehouse. It would only keep its structure, since the rest was a lonely plot of land with no terraces and a stand broken during the war. Once the Valencian pitch was renovated, the Mestalla stadium in which the team managed to bring home their first title in 1941.

During the 1950s, the Valencia ground experienced the deepest change in its whole history. That project resulted in a stadium with a capacity of 45,500 spectators, that eventually saw destruction by a flood in October 1957 that arose from the overflowing of the Turia River. Nevertheless, the Mestalla not only returned to normality, but also some more improvements were added, like artificial light, which was inaugurated during the 1959 Fallas festivities.

During the 1960s, the stadium kept the same appearance, while the urban view around it was quickly being transformed. Moreover, the ground held its first European matches, with Nottingham Forest being the first foreign team to play at the Mestalla, on 15 September 1961.

From 1969, the expression "Anem a Mestalla" ("Let's go to the Mestalla"), so common among the supporters, began to fall into oblivion. The reason of this was due to a proposed name change of the stadium to honor Luis Casanova Giner, the club's most successful president. Giner admitted he was completely overwhelmed by such honour, but requested in 1994 that the original name of Mestalla remained.

In 1972, the head office of the club, located in the back of the numbered terraces, was inaugurated. It consisted of an office of avant-garde style with a trophy hall, which held the founding flag of the club. In the summer of 1973, more goal seats, which meant the elimination of fourteen rows of standing terraces, were added to provide comfort. Club management also considered the possibility of moving the Mestalla from its present location, to land on the outskirts of the town, before deciding against it.

Mestalla also hosted the Spain national football team for the first time in 1925. It was chosen as the national team's group venue when Spain staged the 1982 FIFA World Cup, and at the 1992 Summer Olympics held in Barcelona. All of Spain's matches up to the final were held at Mestalla, as they won Gold. Mestalla has been the setting for important international matches, has held several Cup finals, and has also been the home of Levante. The ground also provided a temporary home for Castellón and Real Madrid for European games due to stadium development.

=== New stadium ===
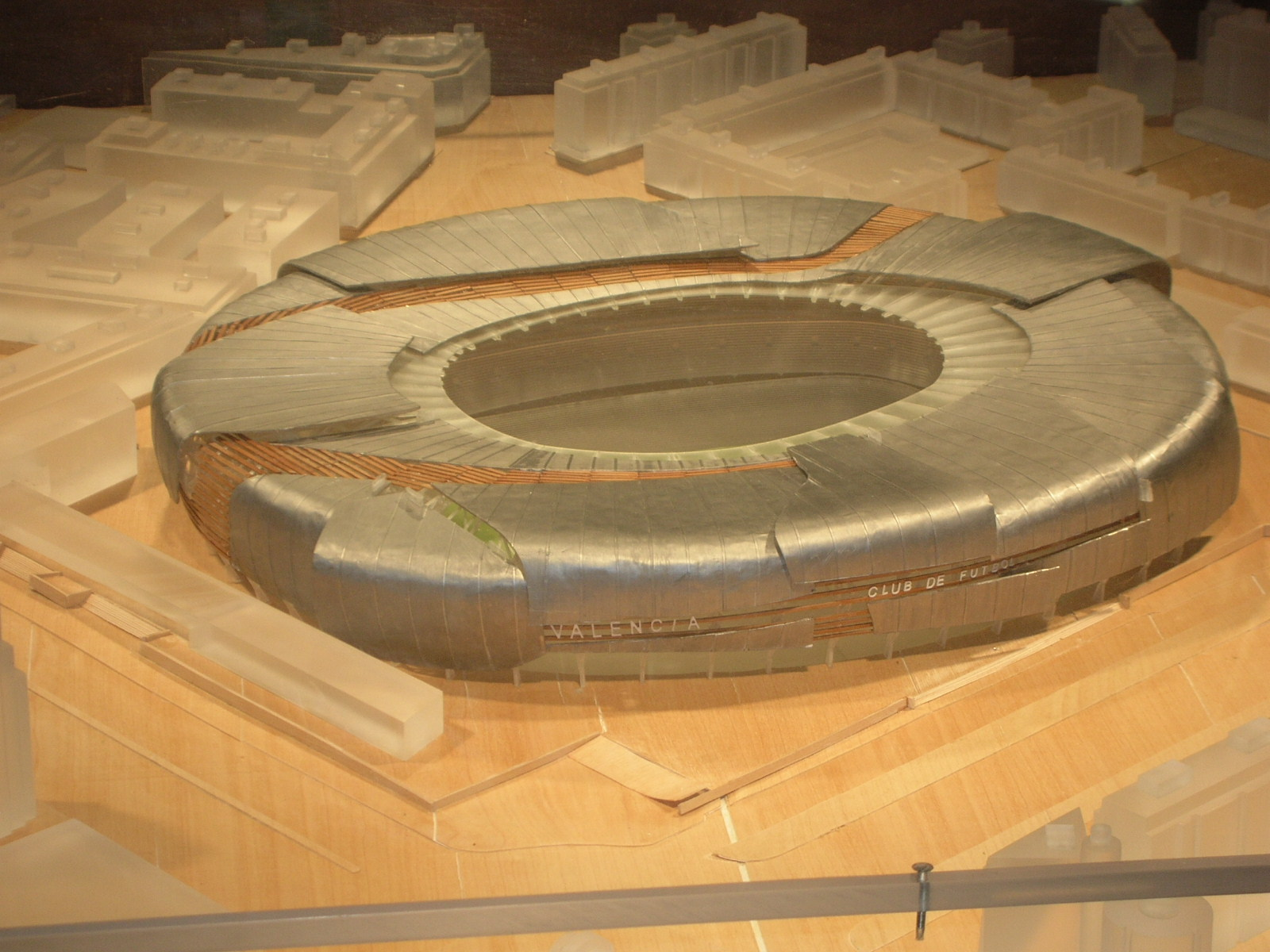
Model of Nou Mestalla

The 2008–09 season was due to be the last season at the Mestalla, with the club intending to move to their new 75,000-seater stadium Nou Mestalla in time for the 2009–10 season. However, due to the club being in financial crisis, work on the new stadium has been heavily delayed. On 10 January 2025, it was reported that construction for Nou Mestalla has resumed and is set to be completed prior to the 2027–28 season.

== Club identity ==
=== Kit ===
Originally, Valencia's kit was composed of white shirts, black shorts and socks of the same colour. Through the years, however, these colours have alternated between white and black. The away kit has been shades of orange in recent years while third alternate kits have featured colors from the club crest—yellow, blood orange and blue.

From 1980 to present
Period	Kit manufacturer	Shirt sponsor (Front)	Shirt sponsor (Back)	Shirt sponsor (sleeve)	Shorts sponsor
1980–1982	Adidas	None	None	None	None
1982–1985	Ressy	None	None	None	None
1985–1990	Rasan	Caja Ahorros Valencia	None	None	None
1990–1992	Puma	Caja Ahorros Valencia	None	None	None
1992–1993	Puma	Mediterránia	None	None	None
1993–1994	Luanvi	Mediterránia	None	None	None
1994–1995	Luanvi	Cip	None	None	None
1995–1998	Luanvi	Ford	None	None	None
1998–2000	Luanvi	Terra Mítica	None	None	None
2000–2001	Nike	Terra Mítica	None	None	None
2001–2002	Nike	Metrored	None	None	None
2002–2003	Nike	Terra Mítica	None	None	None
2003–2004	Nike	Toyota / Panasonic Toyota Racing	None	None	None
2004–2007	Nike	Toyota / Panasonic Toyota Racing	None	None	None
2007–2008	Nike	Toyota / Panasonic Toyota Racing	None	None	None
2007–2008	Nike	Toyota / Panasonic Toyota Racing	Compac Encimeras	Canal Nou	None
2007–2008	Nike	Valencia Experience	Compac Encimeras	Canal Nou	None
2008–2009	Nike	Valencia Experience	Compac Encimeras	Canal Nou	None
2009–2011	Kappa	Unibet	None	None	None
2011–2014	Joma	Jinko Solar	None	None	None
2014–2015	Adidas	None	Gol Televisión/beIN Sports	None	None
2015–2016	Adidas	None	Gol Televisión/beIN Sports	Codere	None
2016–2017	Adidas	None	Gol Televisión/beIN Sports	None	None
2017–2019	Adidas	BLU Products	Gol Televisión/beIN Sports	Sesderma	Alfa Romeo
2019–2021	Puma	bwin	Libertex	Sailun Tyres	Škoda
2021–2022	Puma	SOCIOS.com	Samtrade FX	Sailun Tyres	Škoda
2022–2023	Puma	Cazoo	Herrero Brigantina	Sailun Tyres	Škoda
2023–present	Puma	TM Real Estate Group	None	Divina Seguros	Škoda

The team have also attracted smaller, local sponsors over the years. One example is Lamiplast, a Valencia-based furniture company.

=== Anthem ===
To celebrate the club's 75th anniversary the then president Arturo Tuzón commissioned Pablo Sánchez Torella to compose an anthem for the club. This was a pasodoble whose lyrics were later written by Ramón Gimeno Gil in the Valencian language. The anthem had its official presentation on the anniversary of the club on 21 September 1993.

=== Crest ===
Coat of arms of the city of Valencia

Valencia and the Balearic Islands were conquered by King James I of Aragon during the first half of the 13th century. After the conquest, the king gave them the status of independent kingdoms of whom he was also the king (but they were independent of Aragonese laws and institutions). The arms of Valencia show those of James I.

The unique crowned letters "L" besides the shield were granted by Peter IV. The reason for the letters was that the city had been loyal twice to the king, hence twice a letter "L" and a crown for the king.

There are several possible explanations for the bat; one is that bats are simply quite common in the area. The second theory is that on 9 October 1238, when James I was about to enter the city, re-conquering it from the Moors, a bat landed on the top of his flag, which he interpreted as a good omen. Following his victory, the bat were then added to the coat of arms.

In May 2013, it was reported that DC Comics had started a legal case against the club, claiming that the new bat image design was too similar to Batman. The club issued a statement clarifying that it had intended to use a revised version of its bat logo for a line of casual clothing and applied for permission from the Office of Harmonisation of the Internal Market but the application was dropped after DC Comics filed an objection, not a lawsuit. DC Comics again filed a complaint with the EU's office of IP opposing the trademark application made by Valencia for its centennial logo, claiming there is likely to be confusion with its Batman's symbol.

== Players ==
=== Current squad ===
As of 2 September 2026

Note: Flags indicate national team as defined under FIFA eligibility rules; some limited exceptions apply. Players may hold more than one non-FIFA nationality.

No.	Pos.	Nation	Player
1	GK	MKD	Stole Dimitrievski
2	MF	ARG	Guido Rodríguez
3	DF	ESP	José Copete
4	DF	GUI	Mouctar Diakhaby
5	DF	ESP	César Tárrega (3rd captain)
6	FW	NGR	Umar Sadiq
7	FW	NED	Arnaut Danjuma
8	MF	ESP	Javi Guerra
9	FW	ESP	Hugo Duro
10	FW	ENG	Harvey Elliott (on loan from Liverpool)
11	FW	ESP	Luis Rioja
12	DF	NED	Justin de Haas
13	GK	ESP	Cristian Rivero

No.	Pos.	Nation	Player
14	DF	ESP	José Gayà (captain)
15	MF	MLI	Aliou Dieng
16	FW	ESP	Diego López
18	MF	ESP	Pepelu (vice-captain)
19	FW	ESP	Dani Raba
20	DF	GLP	Dimitri Foulquier
21	DF	ESP	Jesús Vázquez
22	DF	ESP	Arnau Martínez
23	MF	SUI	Filip Ugrinić
24	DF	ARG	Pablo Maffeo (on loan from Olympiacos)
25	GK	NED	Kayne van Oevelen (on loan from Ipswich Town)
39	MF	JPN	Ryūnosuke Satō
—	FW	ESP	Sergi Canós

=== Reserve team ===
Note: Flags indicate national team as defined under FIFA eligibility rules; some limited exceptions apply. Players may hold more than one non-FIFA nationality.

No.	Pos.	Nation	Player
27	FW	ESP	David Otorbi
29	DF	ESP	Alejandro Panach
31	DF	ESP	Rodrigo Gamón
32	DF	KEN	Amos Wanjala
33	MF	ESP	Aaron Mayol

No.	Pos.	Nation	Player
36	DF	ESP	Iker Córdoba
37	FW	ESP	Aimar Blázquez
38	MF	ESP	Jaume Durà
41	DF	ESP	Marcos Navarro

=== Out on loan ===
Note: Flags indicate national team as defined under FIFA eligibility rules; some limited exceptions apply. Players may hold more than one non-FIFA nationality.

No.	Pos.	Nation	Player
—	GK	ESP	Vicent Abril (at Gimnàstic until 30 June 2027)
—	MF	POR	André Almeida (at Racing Santander until 30 June 2027)
—	MF	ESP	Lucas Núñez (at Eibar until 30 June 2027)

No.	Pos.	Nation	Player
—	FW	ESP	Mario Domínguez (at Excelsior until 30 June 2027)
—	FW	ESP	Víctor Fernández (at Valladolid until 30 June 2027)

== Coaching staff ==
Current technical staff
Position	Staff
Technical director	(Spain) Miguel Ángel Corona
Head coach	(Mexico) Javier Aguirre
Assistant head coach	(Spain) Jorge Alarcón (Spain) Josep Alcácer
Field assistant coach	(Spain) Ángel de las Heras
Goalkeeping coach	(Spain) Marcos Abad (Spain) José Manuel Ochotorena
Team Manager	(Spain) Voro
Fitness coach	(Spain) Juan Monar (Spain) Rafael Aranda
Analyst	(Spain) Fran Lapiedra
Assistant fitness coach	(Spain) Sergi Benet
Assistant goalkeeping coach	(Spain) Andoni Ochotorena
Chief of medical services	(Spain) Pedro López
Delegate	(Spain) David Rangel
Chief of kit man	(Spain) Chemanu López

Last updated: 28 December 2024
Source: Valencia CF

== Notable coaches ==
The following coaches have all won at least one major trophy when in charge of the club
Name	Period	Total								
Name	Period	Total	Domestic			International				
Name	Period	Total	LL	CdR	SC	UCL	UCWC	UEL	UIC	USC
(Spain) Ramón Encinas Dios	1939–42	2	1	1	-	-	-	-	-	–
(Spain) Eduardo Cubells	1943–46	1	1	-	-	-	-	-	-	–
(Spain) Luis Casas Pasarín	1946–48	1	1	-	-	-	-	-	-	–
(Spain) Jacinto Quincoces	1948–54	3	-	2	1	-	-	-	-	–
(Spain) Domingo Balmanya	1960–62	1	-	-	-	-	-	1	-	–
(Argentina) Alejandro Scopelli	1962–63	1	-	-	-	-	-	1	-	–
(Spain) Edmundo Suárez	1966–68	1	-	1	-	-	-	-	-	–
(Argentina) Alfredo Di Stéfano	1970–74, 1979–80, 1986–88	2	1	-	-	-	1	-	-	–
(Spain) Bernardino Pérez	1979, 1980–82	2	-	1	-	-	-	-	-	1
(Italy) Claudio Ranieri	1997–99, 2004–05	3	-	1	-	-	-	-	1	1
(Argentina) Héctor Cúper	1999–01	1	-	-	1	-	-	-	-	–
(Spain) Rafael Benítez	2001–04	3	2	-	-	-	-	1	-	–
(Netherlands) Ronald Koeman	2007–08	1	-	1	-	-	-	-	-	–
(Spain) Marcelino	2017–19	1	-	1	-	-	-	-	-	–
Total	1919–	23	6	8	2	0	1	3	1	2

LL. = La Liga; CdR = Copa del Rey; SC = Supercopa de España; UCL = UEFA Champions League; UCWC = UEFA Cup Winners' Cup; UEL = UEFA Europa League; UIC = UEFA Intertoto Cup; USC = UEFA Super Cup

=== Gallery ===
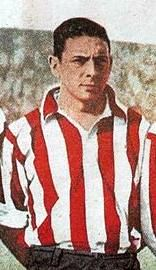
Alejandro Scopelli, the first foreigner to win a trophy with Valencia, the 1962 Fairs Cup.

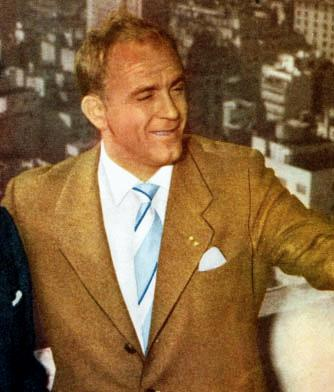
Alfredo Di Stéfano had three successful spells as coach of the club.

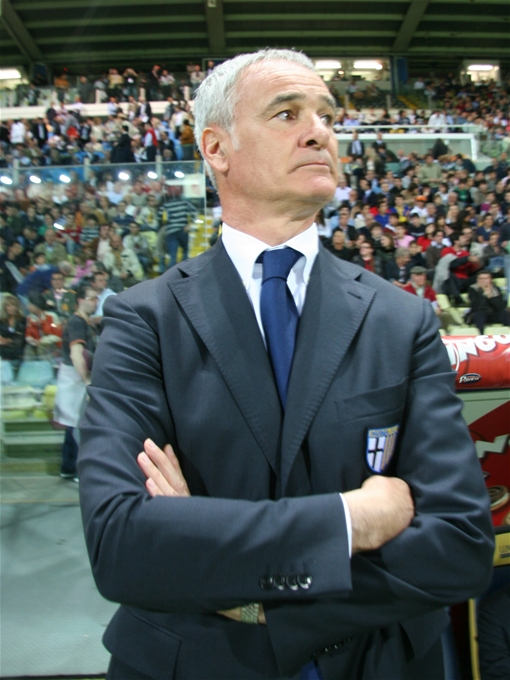
Claudio Ranieri coached Valencia on two occasions with mixed success.

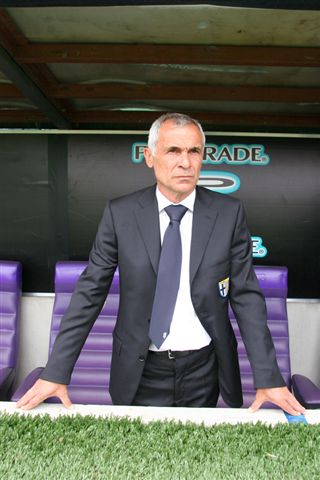
Héctor Cúper tenure saw the club rise back to prominence in European football.

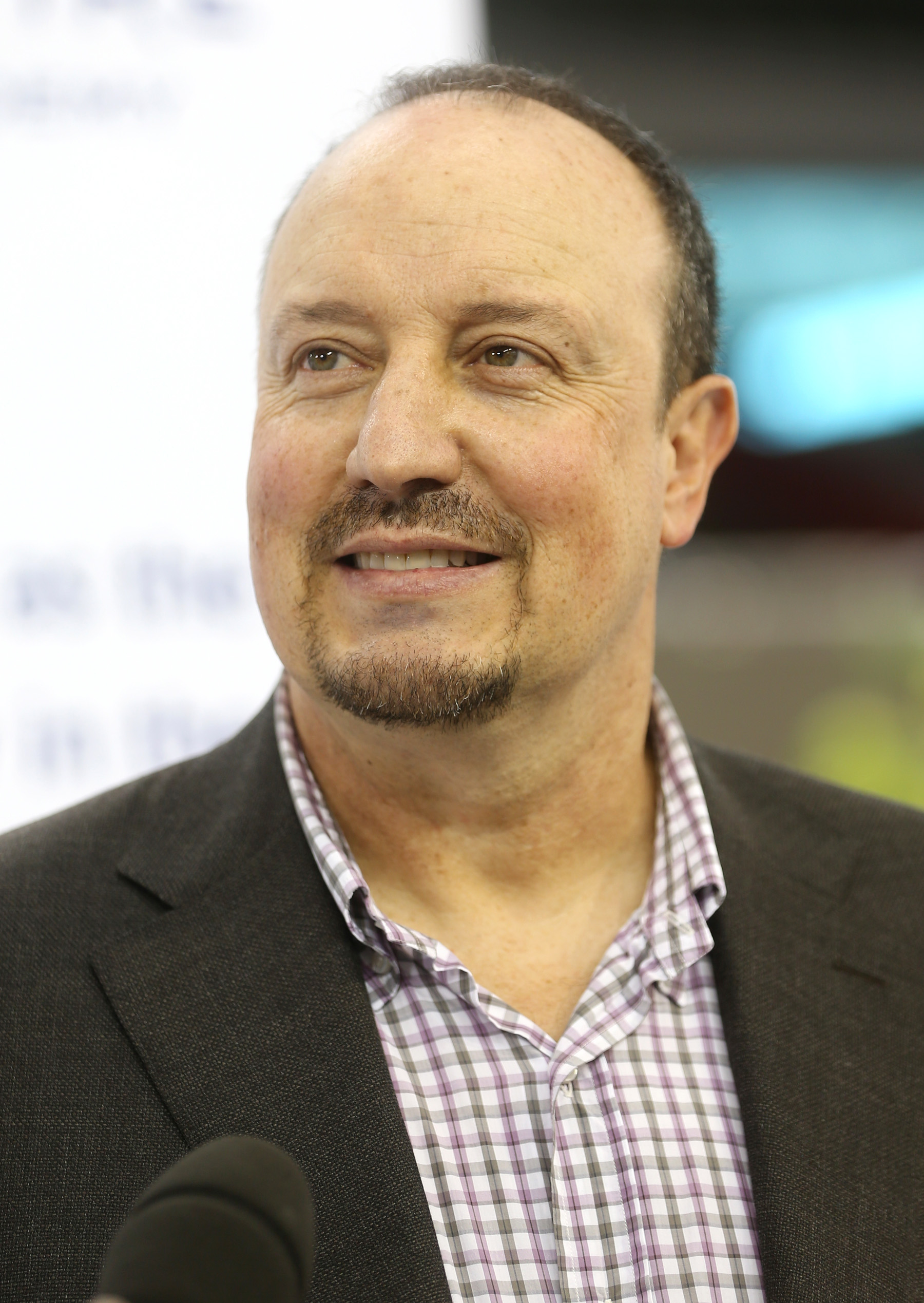
Rafael Benítez, Valencia's most successful coach, with two league titles and one UEFA Cup over the period of three years

== Presidents ==
Period	President
1919–1922	Octavio Milego
1922	Alfredo Aigües
1922	Francisco Vidal Muñoz
1922–1924	Ramón Leonarte Ribera
1924	Francisco Zarandieta
1924–1925	Pablo Verdeguer Comes
1925–1929	Facundo Pascual Quilis
1929–1932	Juan Giménez Cánovas
1932–1933	Manuel del Moral
1933–1935	Adolfo Royo Soriano
1935–1936	Francisco Almenar
1936	Luis Casanova Giner
1939–1940	Alfredo Giménez Buesa
1940–1959	Luis Casanova Giner

Period	President
1959–1961	Vicente Iborra Gil
1961–1973	Julio de Miguel
1973–1975	Francisco Casares
1975	Alfredo Cervera
1976–1983	José Ramos Costa
1983	José Barrachina
1983–1986	Vicente Alfonso
1986	Pedro Cortés
1986–1990	Arturo Tuzón
1990	José Domingo
1990–1993	Arturo Tuzón
1993–1994	Melchor Hoyos
1994–1997	Francisco Roig Alfonso
1997–2001	Pedro Cortés

Period	President
2001–2004	Jaume Ortí
2004–2008	Juan Bautista Soler
2008	Agustín Morera
2008–2009	Vicente Soriano
2009	Javier Gómez Molina
2009–2013	Manuel Llorente
2013	Vicente Andreu
2013–2014	Amadeo Salvo
2014–2017	Lay Hoon Chan
2017–2022	Anil Murthy
2022–2025	Lay Hoon Chan
2025–	Kiat Lim

== Player records ==
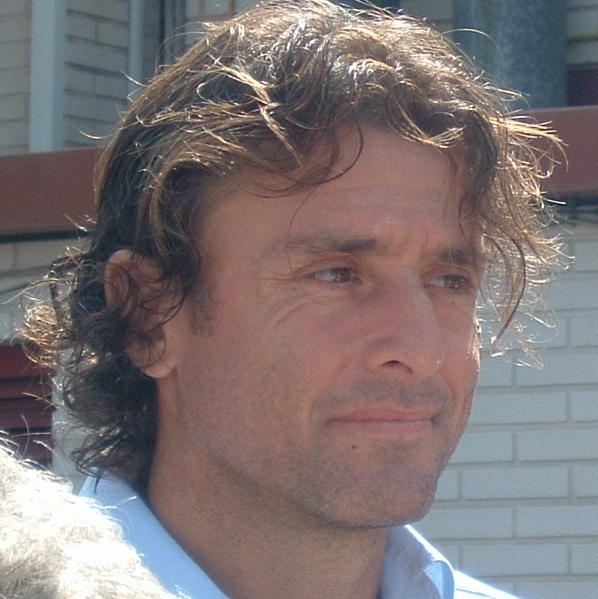
Full-back Amedeo Carboni, the foreigner with the most appearances (350)

Most appearances
Rank	Player	Nationality	Apps	Years
1	Fernando	(Spain)	556	1983–1998
2	Ricardo Arias	(Spain)	521	1976–1992
3	David Albelda	(Spain)	485	1995–2013
4	Miguel Ángel Angulo	(Spain)	434	1996–2009
5	Manuel Mestre	(Spain)	424	1956–1969
6	Santiago Cañizares	(Spain)	416	1998–2008
7	Enrique Saura	(Spain)	400	1975–1985
8	Dani Parejo	(Spain)	383	2011–2020
9	José Gayá	(Spain)	376	2012–present
10	José Claramunt	(Spain)	375	1966–1978

Most goals
Rank	Player	Nationality	Goals	Years
1	Mundo	(Spain)	238	1939–1950
2	Waldo Machado	(Brazil)	160	1961–1970
3	Mario Kempes	(Argentina)	149	1976–1981; 1982–1984
4	Fernando	(Spain)	143	1983–1998
5	David Villa	(Spain)	130	2005–2010
6	Silvestre Igoa	(Spain)	117	1941–1950
7	Manuel Badenes	(Spain)	102	1950–1956
8	Vicente Seguí	(Spain)	91	1946–1959
9	Luboslav Penev	(Bulgaria)	88	1989–1995
10	Epi Fernández	(Spain)	87	1940–1949

=== Transfers ===
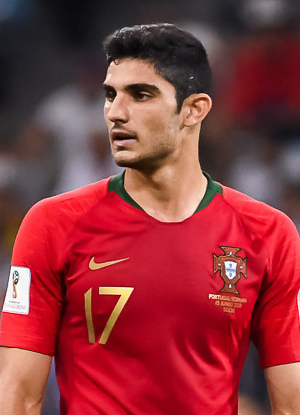
Gonçalo Guedes is the most expensive signing in Valencia's history, costing €40m in 2018.

Record transfer fees paid by Valencia
Rank	Player	Fee (€)	Paid to	Date
1	(Portugal) Gonçalo Guedes	40,000,000	(France) Paris Saint-Germain	2018
2	(Netherlands) Jasper Cillessen	35,000,000	(Spain) Barcelona	2019
3	(Spain) Rodrigo	30,000,000	(Portugal) Benfica	2015
4	(Spain) Álvaro Negredo	28,000,000	(England) Manchester City	2014
5	(Spain) Joaquín	25,000,000	(Spain) Real Betis	2006
5	(Argentina) Enzo Pérez	25,000,000	(Portugal) Benfica	2015
5	(Central African Republic) Geoffrey Kondogbia	25,000,000	(Italy) Internazionale	2018
8	(Argentina) Pablo Aimar	24,000,000	(Argentina) River Plate	2001
9	(Tunisia) Aymen Abdennour	22,000,000	(France) Monaco	2015
10	(Argentina) Ezequiel Garay	20,000,000	(Russia) Zenit Saint Petersburg	2016

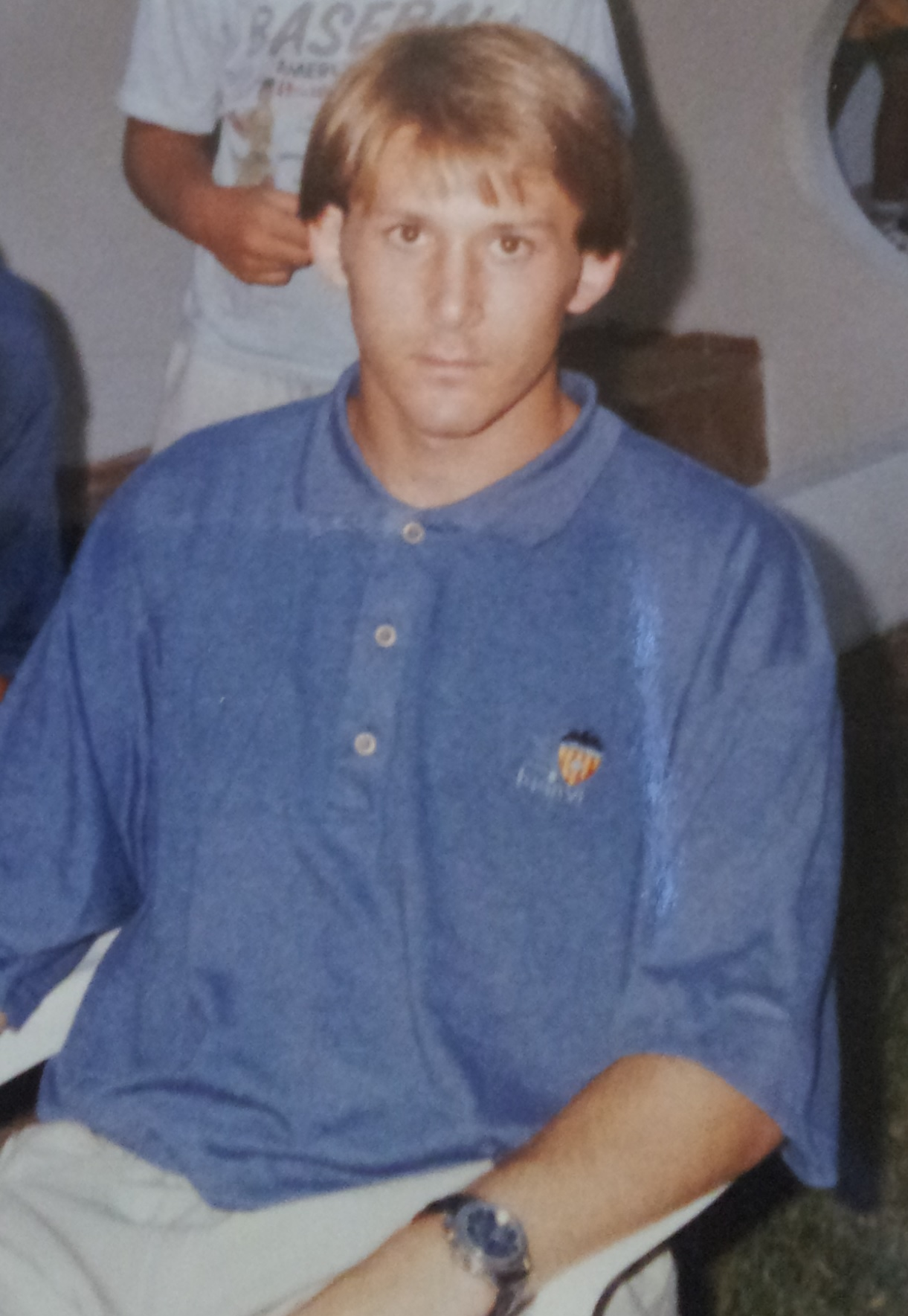
The largest transfer involving Valencia was the sale of Gaizka Mendieta to Lazio for €48 million in 2001.

Record transfer fees received by Valencia
Pos.	Player	Fee (€)	Received from	Date
1	(Spain) Gaizka Mendieta	48,000,000	(Italy) Lazio	2001
2	(Argentina) Nicolás Otamendi	45,000,000	(England) Manchester City	2015
3	(Portugal) Gonçalo Guedes	41,500,000	(England) Wolverhampton Wanderers	2022
4	(Germany) Shkodran Mustafi	41,000,000	(England) Arsenal	2016
5	(Portugal) João Cancelo	40,400,000	(Italy) Juventus	2018
6	(Spain) David Villa	40,000,000	(Spain) Barcelona	2010
7	(Portugal) André Gomes	35,000,000	(Spain) Barcelona	2016
8	(Spain) David Silva	33,000,000	(England) Manchester City	2010
9	(Argentina) Claudio López	32,000,000	(Italy) Lazio	2000
10	(Spain) Paco Alcácer	30,000,000	(Spain) Barcelona	2016
10	(Spain) Roberto Soldado	30,000,000	(England) Tottenham Hotspur	2013

== Seasons ==
- 90 seasons in La Liga
- 4 seasons in Segunda División

== Honours ==
Type	Competition	Titles	Seasons
Domestic	La Liga	6	1941–42, 1943–44, 1946–47, 1970–71, 2001–02, 2003–04
Domestic	Segunda División	2	1930–31, 1986–87
Domestic	Copa del Rey	8	1941, 1948–49, 1954, 1966–67, 1978–79, 1998–99, 2007–08, 2018–19
Domestic	Supercopa de España	1	1999
Domestic	Copa Eva Duarte	1	1949
Continental	European Cup Winners' Cup	1	1979–80
Continental	UEFA Cup	1	2003–04
Continental	European Super Cup/UEFA Super Cup	2	1980, 2004
Continental	Inter-Cities Fairs Cup	2	1961–62, 1962–63
Continental	UEFA Intertoto Cup	1	1998
Regional	Levante Championship / Valencian Championship	10	1922–23, 1924–25, 1925–26, 1926–27, 1930–31, 1931–32, 1932–33, 1933–34, 1936–37, 1939–40

- record

=== Awards & recognitions ===
- IFFHS The World's Club Team of the Year: 2004

== Valencia CF in international football ==
Season-by-season record in international competitions
^{1} Group stage. Highest-ranked eliminated team in case of qualification, lowest-ranked qualified team in case of elimination.
Intercontinental Cup / FIFA Club World Cup
Season					Quarterfinals	Semifinals	Final / 3rd pos.
UEFA Super Cup
Season							Final
1979–80							(England) Nottingham Forest
2003–04							(Portugal) Porto
European Cup / UEFA Champions League
Season	Preliminary stages		Round of 32	Round of 16	Quarterfinals	Semifinals	Final
1971–72		Union Luxembourg	(Socialist Federal Republic of Yugoslavia) Hajduk	(Hungary) Újpest			
1999-00		(Israel) Hapoel Haifa	(Scotland) Rangers ^{1}	(Italy) Fiorentina ^{1}	(Italy) Lazio	(Spain) Barcelona	(Spain) Real Madrid
2000–01		(Austria) Tirol Innsbruck	(Greece) Olympiacos ^{1}	(Austria) Sturm Graz ^{1}	(England) Arsenal	(England) Leeds United	(Germany) Bayern Munich
2002–03			(England) Liverpool ^{1}	(England) Arsenal ^{1}	(Italy) Internazionale		
2004–05			(Germany) Werder Bremen ^{1}				
2006–07		(Austria) Red Bull Salzburg	(Ukraine) Shakhtar Donetsk ^{1}	(Italy) Internazionale	(England) Chelsea		
2007–08		(Sweden) Elfsborg	(Germany) Schalke ^{1}				
2010–11			(Scotland) Rangers ^{1}	(Germany) Schalke 04			
2011–12			(Germany) Bayer Leverkusen ^{1}				
2012–13			(Belarus) BATE Borisov ^{1}	(France) Paris Saint-Germain			
2015–16		(France) Monaco	(Belgium) Gent ^{1}				
2018–19			(England) Man. United ^{1}				
2019–20			(Netherlands) Ajax ^{1}	(Italy) Atalanta			
UEFA Cup Winners' Cup
Season	Preliminary stages		Round of 32	Round of 16	Quarter-finals	Semi-finals	Final
1967–68			(Northern Ireland) Crusaders	(Romania) Steaua București	(West Germany) Bayern Munich		
1979–80			(Denmark) B 1903	(Scotland) Rangers	(Spain) Barcelona	(France) Nantes	(England) Arsenal
1980–81			(France) Monaco	(East Germany) Carl Zeiss Jena			
Inter-Cities Fairs Cup / UEFA Cup / UEFA Europa League
Season	Preliminary stages		Round of 32	Round of 16	Quarterfinals	Semifinals	Final
1961–62			(England) Nottingham Forest	(Switzerland) Lausanne-Sport	(Italy) Internazionale	(Hungary) MTK Budapest	(Spain) Barcelona
1962–63			(Scotland) Celtic	(Scotland) Dunfermline Athletic	(Scotland) Hibernian	(Italy) Roma	(Socialist Federal Republic of Yugoslavia) Dinamo
1963–64			(Republic of Ireland) Shamrock Rovers	(Austria) Rapid Wien	(Hungary) Újpest	(West Germany) 1. FC Köln	(Spain) Real Zaragoza
1964–65		(Belgium) RFC Liège					
1965–66		(Scotland) Hibernian	(Switzerland) Basel	(England) Leeds United			
1966–67		(West Germany) 1. FC Nürnberg	(Socialist Federal Republic of Yugoslavia) Red Star Belgrade	(England) Leeds United			
1968–69		(Portugal) Sporting CP					
1969–70		(Bulgaria) Slavia Sofia					
1970–71		(Republic of Ireland) Cork Hibernians	(Belgium) Beveren				
1972–73		(England) Manchester City	(Socialist Federal Republic of Yugoslavia) Red Star Belgrade				
1978–79		(Bulgaria) CSKA Sofia	(Romania) Argeș Pitești	(England) West Bromwich Albion			
1981–82		(Czechoslovakia) Bohemians	(Portugal) Boavista	(Socialist Federal Republic of Yugoslavia) Hajduk Split	(Sweden) IFK Göteborg		
1982–83		(England) Manchester U.	(Czechoslovakia) Baník Ostrava	(Soviet Union) Spartak Moscow	(Belgium) Anderlecht		
1989–90		(Romania) Victoria București	(Portugal) Porto				
1990–91		(Greece) Iraklis	(Italy) Roma				
1992–93		(Italy) Napoli					
1993–94		(France) Nantes	(Germany) Karlsruher SC				
1996–97		(Germany) Bayern Munich	(Czech Republic) Slavia Prague	(Turkey) Beşiktaş	(Germany) Schalke 04		
1998–99		(Romania) Steaua București	(England) Liverpool				
2001–02	(Russia) Chernomorets Novorossiysk	(Poland) Legia Warsaw	(Scotland) Celtic	(Switzerland) Servette	(Italy) Internazionale		
2003–04	(Sweden) AIK	(Israel) Maccabi Haifa	(Turkey) Beşiktaş	(Turkey) Gençlerbirliği	(France) Bordeaux	(Spain) Villarreal	(France) Marseille
2004–05			(Romania) Steaua București				
2008–09	(Portugal) Marítimo	(Belgium) Club Brugge ^{1}	(Ukraine) Dynamo Kyiv				
2009–10	(Norway) Stabæk	(Italy) Genoa ^{1}	(Belgium) Club Brugge	(Germany) Werder Bremen	(Spain) Atlético Madrid		
2011–12			(England) Stoke City	(Netherlands) PSV	(Netherlands) AZ	(Spain) Atlético Madrid	
2013–14		(Russia) Kuban Krasnodar ^{1}	(Ukraine) Dynamo Kyiv	(Bulgaria) Ludogorets Razgrad	(Switzerland) Basel	(Spain) Sevilla	
2015–16			(Austria) Rapid Wien	(Spain) Athletic Bilbao			
2018–19			(Scotland) Celtic	(Russia) Krasnodar	(Spain) Villarreal	(England) Arsenal	
UEFA Intertoto Cup
Season			Round of 32	Round of 16	Quarter-finals	Semi-finals	Finals
1998–99					(Russia) Shinnik Yaroslavl	(Spain) Espanyol	Austria Salzburg
2005–06					(Belgium) Gent	(Netherlands) Roda JC	(Germany) Hamburger SV

== The Academy: Training Centre Foundation Valencia CF ==
Since May 2009, Valencia CF has had a training centre, this is the first multidisciplinary training center for a football club in Spain.

The Training Centre Foundation Valencia CF "The Academy" offers university education, classroom training, and online training related to sport and football (soccer).

Valencia CF is one of the few clubs in Spain that organises a Sport Management MBA, the MBA in International Sport Management, currently performs with Valencia Catholic University Saint Vincent Martyr.

On the 90th anniversary of Valencia CF, the academy opened with the University of Valencia the first university course that studied the history of a football club, Valencia CF is the first football club in Spain to be an object of study in college.

== Motorsports involvement ==
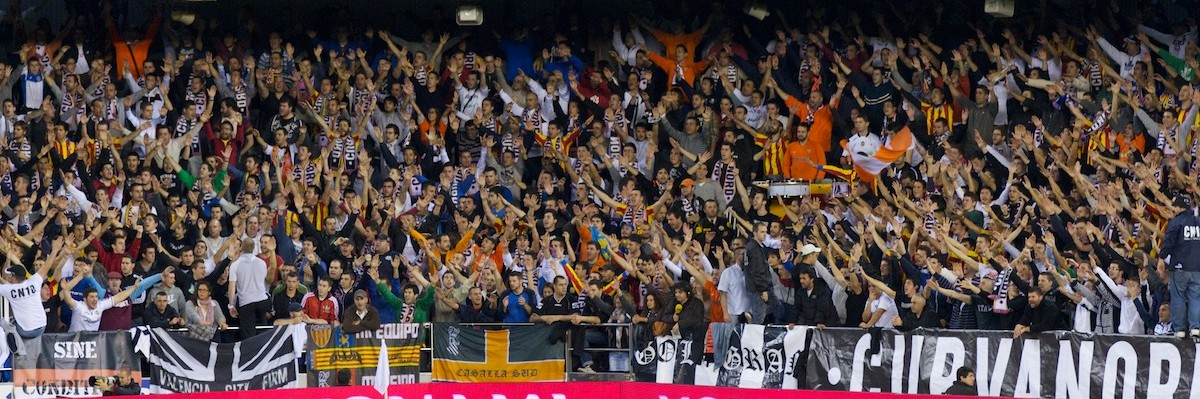
Valencia CF fans

Valencia CF were also involved in motorsports such as Formula One, Super GT, MotoGP, Moto2, Moto3, 250cc and Formula Nippon. Valencia CF was an official partner of Panasonic Toyota Racing in 2003 until 2008 to commemorate Toyota as their shirt sponsor. Valencia CF also sponsored all Toyota-engined Formula Nippon teams and also Toyota Super GT teams in GT500 and GT300 cars. In 2009, Valencia CF became an official partner of former 250cc team Stop And Go Racing Team and in 2014 of Aspar Team in MotoGP, Moto2 and Moto3 classes, respectively.

== Esports involvement ==
In June 2016, Valencia opened an esports division with presences in Hearthstone, Rocket League and League of Legends – in the last case, they joined Beşiktaş, Santos, Schalke and PSG in acquiring League teams. They announced their League roster on 13 July, composed mostly of Spanish players, including some with European League of Legends Championship Series (EU LCS) experience.

In November 2020, Valencia CF eSports launched a team on Arena of Valor in Thailand. The team consist of six Thai players, competing in the RoV Pro League competitions. They joined the local club Buriram United FC, and after that, French club Paris Saint-Germain FC in acquiring AoV teams.

== See also ==
- Valencia CF Mestalla
- Orange Trophy
- Richest football clubs
- European football records
- List of UEFA club competition winners

== Sources ==
- Valencia Club de Fútbol (1919–1969), Bodas de Oro (in Spanish), de José Manuel Hernández Perpiñá. 1969, Talleres Tipográficos Vila, S.L.
- Historia del Valencia F.C. (in Spanish), de Jaime Hernández Perpiñá. 1974, Ediciones Danae, S.A. OCLC 2985617
- La Gran Historia del Valencia C.F. (in Spanish), de Jaime Hernández Perpiñá. 1994, Levante-EMV. ISBN 84-87502-36-9
- DVD Valencia C.F. (Historia Temática). Un histórico en la Liga. (in Spanish), 2003, Superdeporte. V-4342-2003
