= Lay Hoon Chan =

Singaporean sports executive

Lay Hoon
- Born: August 1964 (age 61); Singapore
- Education: National University of Singapore
- Known for: President of the Spanish football club Valencia CF

Lay Hoon or Lay Hoon Chan (born 1964) is a Singaporean sports executive and financial adviser. She has twice been appointed the President of the Spanish football club Valencia CF.

== Early life and career ==
Chan was born in August 1964. She has a degree in accounting from the National University of Singapore, and first worked in the UK as an auditor. Described as "Peter Lim's right hand man" and the "basic piece" of his business network, she has served the billionaire in different capacities including as financial advisor to his business ventures, partner to the tycoon in the Meriton Holdings investment fund, director at Rowsley, executive chairperson of RSP Holdings, and from 2014 as president of Valencia CF when Lim bought the club.

In her first year, the club came fourth in their league but after that they were twelfth. The manager Nuno Espirito Santo left in 2015 and he was replaced by Gary Neville for four months before he was sacked, with Chan citing a "language barrier". Pako Ayestaran lasted six months, then Cesare Prandelli was manager for three months until Salvador "Voro" Gonzalez took over. Chan left the club in June 2017.

Valencia CF announced in April 2017 that Chan would be replaced by Anil Murthy. In June 2022 Anil Murthy left after reportedly insulting the club's owner. Peter Lim's sons became club directors and Chan returned as the club president.

In February 2023 there were protests at a match where fans boycotted the first 20 minutes of the game to protest about Peter Lim's and Chan's leadership. The team was then 19th in the league. In the same month, her mother died and this was commemorated by her staff and reported by the press.
