= Adriana Abascal =

Mexican-born model

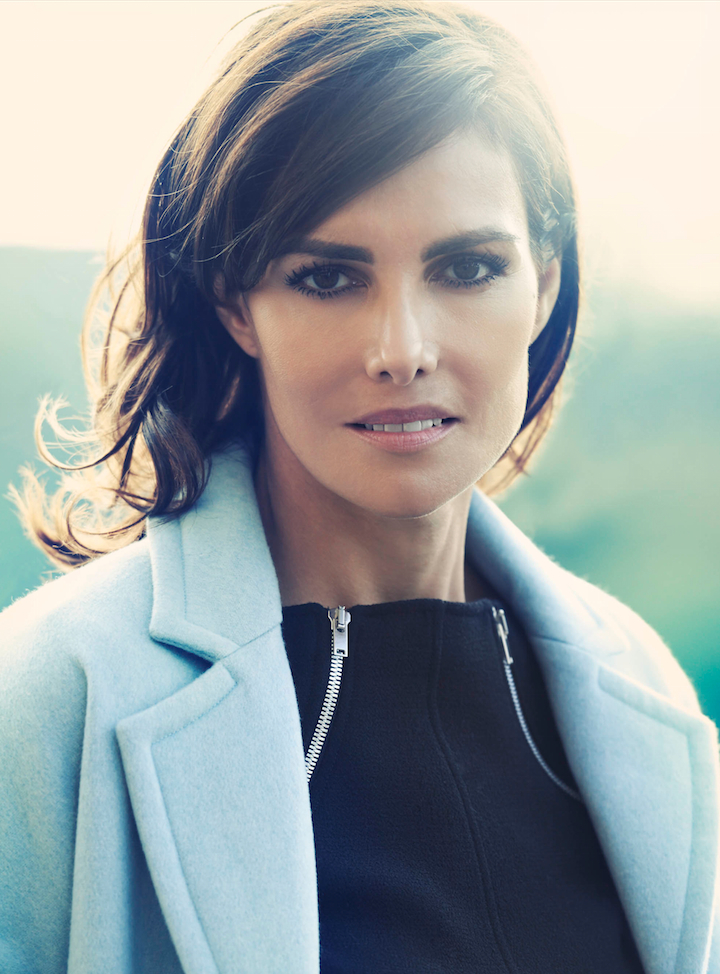
- Abascal in 2015
- Born: Adriana Abascal López-Cisneros; October 31, 1970 (age 55); Veracruz, Veracruz, Mexico
- Height: 5 ft 10 in (178 cm)
- Title: Founder of Maison Skorpios; Fashion model Author
- Spouses: Emilio Azcárraga Milmo (m. 1990; died 1997) Juan Villalonga Navarro (m. 2000; div. 2009) Emmanuel Schreder (m. 2013; div. 2021)
- Children: 3
- Website: www.maisonskorpios.com

Adriana Abascal López-Cisneros (born October 31, 1970) is a Mexican model, beauty pageant titleholder and businesswoman. She is the founder of Maison Skorpios, a luxury shoe brand specialized in boots, manufactured in Italy and based in Paris. She appeared on the covers of magazines including Elle, Vogue, Marie Claire, Hola! and Vanity Fair, she is also an executive producer, TV show host (US & Latin America) and an author.

She won the title of Señorita México 1988 and participated in Miss Universe 1989.

Abascal became a host of the Emmy-nominated TV show "Todobebé" which aired nationally on Telemundo and syndicated across Latin America. In 2002, she wrote the book "Una mujer, cada Mujer" (One woman, every Woman), distributed in the US, Mexico, and Spain.

She has participated in designer shows including Paris Haute Couture - Armani, Valentino, Giambattista Valli, Versace, John Paul Gaultier, Stephane Rolland, Thierry Lasry, Alber Elbaz, and at NY Fashion Week - Ralph Lauren, Oscar de la Renta, Tory Burch, Cusnie et Ochs, Novis, Lela Rose, Christian Siriano and Tommy Hilfiger.

In 2013, Abascal became the host and main judge of the series, "Desafio Fashionista" for Discovery Home & Health. In 2014, she produced the show "My Style Stories" with E-Entertainment.

Adriana Abascal's Parisian luxury footwear brand, Maison Skorpios, was featured in the popular TV series Emily in Paris.

Currently, she divides her time between Paris and Los Angeles. She speaks Spanish, English, French, and Italian.

== Personal life ==
Abascal had a relationship with Televisa's owner Emilio Azcárraga Milmo from 1990 until his death in 1997. She later married Spanish businessman Juan Villalonga in 2000; this marriage produced 2 daughters and a son; they divorced in 2009. In June 2013, she married French financier and businessman Emmanuel Schreder in Ibiza. The marriage ended in 2021.

In 2025, Vanity Fair revealed her relationship with Emanuele Filiberto of Savoy.

Awards and achievements
Preceded by (Hong Kong) Pauline Yeung	Miss Universe 4th Runner-up; 1989	Succeeded by (Mexico) Marilé del Rosario
Preceded by (Puebla) Amanda Olivares	Señorita México; 1988	Succeeded by (Tlaxcala) Marilé del Rosario
