= Juan Villalonga =

Spanish businessman (born 1953)

- Born: Juan Villalonga Navarro; April 8, 1953 (age 73); Madrid, Spain
- Known for: McKinsey & Company -partner (1980–1989); Credit Suisse First Boston - CEO (1993–1994); Bankers Trust in Spain - CEO (1995–1996); Telefónica - CEO (1996–2000)
- Spouses: Adriana Abascal (m. 2000; div. 2009) Vanessa Von Zitzewitz (m. 2011; div. 2024)

Juan Villalonga Navarro (born April 8, 1953) is a Spanish businessman. He was a partner at McKinsey & Company in the 1980s, CEO for Credit Suisse First Boston and Bankers Trust in Spain in the early 1990s, and CEO of Telefónica from 1996 to 2000.

In 2010, Harvard Business Review named Villalonga one of the world's top 100 CEOs.

== Early life, education ==
Juan Villalonga is a native of Madrid, Spain, and was born on April 8, 1953. He comes from an established Spanish family deeply entrenched in the economics and politics of the country. His paternal family owned the Tramway and Railway Company of Valencia from CTFV (Compañía de Tranvías y Ferrocarriles de Valencia) founded in 1917. His great uncle, Ignacio Villalonga, was Governor of Catalonia when Generalitat was suspended in 1935. His great uncle was also chairman for one of Spain's largest banks, Banco Central (1943–1970), and was an outspoken critic of Francoist Spain.

Villalonga attended school at the Colegio Nuestra Senora del Pilar in Madrid. There, he became friends with José María Aznar, who would serve as Prime Minister of Spain from 1996 to 2004. In 1970 Villalonga began attending his great uncle's alma mater, the University of Deusto, to earn a degree in law. He graduated in 1975. While undertaking an MBA at the IESE in Barcelona, Spain, University of Navarre from 1975 to 1977, he completed his military service, rising to the rank of Alferez (Second Lieutenant) (1974–1975).

== Career ==
For the next 18 years Villalonga worked in the financial markets, starting in New York with J.P. Morgan’s credit analyst team. In this role, he evaluated the credit worthiness of companies and made quantitative analysis and credit projections. In 1979, he was promoted to Account Officer and assigned to Madrid.

He joined McKinsey & Company in 1980 and worked as a partner across the United States, Portugal, Brazil, Italy and Spain. During this period, he serviced McKinsey clients such as Banco Santander, which is ranked as the largest bank in the Eurozone. He opened McKinsey's Rome office in 1987.

He subsequently became CEO for Credit Suisse First Boston, Spain and Bankers Trust in Spain.

=== Telefónica ===
In 1996, Villalonga was appointed chief executive officer of Telefónica, proposed by shareholders Argentaria, Banco Bilbao, La Caixa, and with endorsement of the Spanish Premier, Jose Maria Aznar. In four years under his leadership, Telefónica's market capitalization increased by $127 billion, securing the company's leadership position in Spain and turning Telefónica into an international telecommunications power. He also developed a successful model for acquisitions where transactions were made in stock.

In 1997, the European telecommunications market was liberalized, and Telefónica ceased to have a monopoly in Spain. Villalonga used the event to expand the company beyond Spain into other Spanish-speaking markets. In 1997, he entered the company into pre-BRIC Brazil.

In 1998, Villalonga launched Telefónica Interactiva (also known as Terra Networks), Telefónica's Internet portal. He aggressively acquired several local start-ups in Spain and the main Latin American markets, turning Terra into a major internet company. These acquisitions included Ole (Spain), Zaz (Brazil), Infosel (Mexico), Gauchonet y Donde (Argentina) and Chevere (Venezuela). In November 1999, Terra had a high-profile IPO in the U.S. and Spain, and its shares rose from the initial price of €11.81 to €157.65 within three months.

He then had Telefónica purchase the American Internet search company, Lycos, creating one of the world's largest Internet companies. It opened the U.S. market of 30 million Spanish speakers to Terra and provided access to parts of the world where Telefónica did not yet have a foothold, such as Asia. The purchase for $12.5 billion in stock in May 2000 created a new company known as Terra Lycos Inc., which had a pro-forma revenue of approximately $500 million, an estimated 50 million new users, and 175 million page views per day.

In June 2000, Villalonga strengthened the international standing of Telefónica's Spanish Group in an equity swap known as "Operation Verónica." He had Telefónica buy out minority shareholders in its Latin American subsidiaries: Telefónica de Argentina, Telesp in Brazil, Telefónica del Perú, and Tele Sudeste. He also reorganized the company along product rather than geographical lines. During the same period, Telefónica acquired Dutch entertainment giant Endemol for €5.5 billion in stock.

In June 2000, the Madrid daily El Mundo claimed that Villalonga had been involved in insider trading. Amid these rumors and pressure from the Spanish government, Villalonga resigned as chairman of Telefónica in July 2000. In August 2000, the Spanish stock market commission, the Comisión Nacional del Mercado de Valores (CNMV), cleared Villalonga of insider trading charges.

=== Recent career ===
Villalonga served as a board member of the Espirito Santo Financial Group until September 2011. He is a board member of Axiata, and is a director of the technology company Idea.

In 2010, Harvard Business Review named Villalonga one of the Best-Performing CEO's in the World.
