= Manuel Llorente =

Spanish businessman and economist (born 1952)

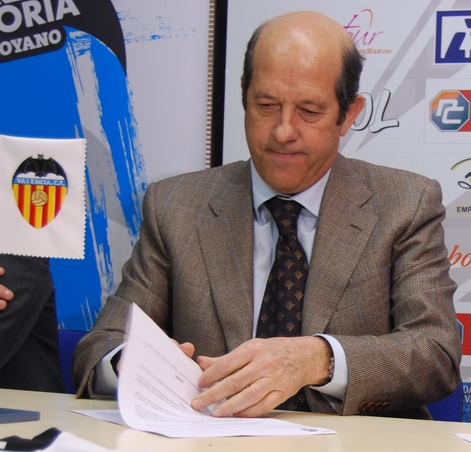
- Llorente in 2012
- Born: 25 January 1952 (age 74); Benetússer, Spain
- Occupations: Businessman, economist
- Known for: President of Valencia CF from 2009 to 2013

Manuel Llorente Martín (born 25 January 1952) is a Spanish businessman and economist. He was the president of the football club Valencia CF from 2009 to 2013.

Having worked for Mercadona, owned by the Roig family, Llorente joined the board of Valencia in 1995 under Francisco Roig Alfonso. He served as general manager and director for a decade. After serving as executive president of the Roig-owned basketball club Pamesa Valencia, he returned to Valencia CF in 2009 as president. His tenure saw the club's debt reduced by selling players such as David Villa and Juan Mata, as well as the collapse of a deal with Bankia to finance the Nou Mestalla stadium. He resigned in April 2013.

== Early life and career ==
Llorente was born in Benetússer in the Province of Valencia. When he was six, his father, a member of the Civil Guard, died of cancer. When he was eight, he was sent to the Madrid orphanage for children of members of the Civil Guard, as his mother was too ill to care for him; she died two years later. His maternal grandparents had legal custody of him but he only visited them on holiday.

Llorente chose not to be the third generation of his family in the Civil Guard, and instead enrolled in an economics degree at the Complutense University of Madrid. He began working in furniture in Valencia, and turned down a 70,000 Spanish peseta per month job offer with a furniture company to work in Cárnicas Roig in 1977, the business that would become Mercadona. He was assigned by Juan Roig to do market research.

== Football ==
=== General manager and director of Valencia CF ===
Llorente joined the board at Valencia CF in 1995 under the presidency of Juan Roig's brother Francisco, and served as general manager, later director. He served subsequent presidents Pedro Cortés and Jaume Ortí, and left in 2004 after failing to achieve a new contract for manager Rafael Benítez, who had won two La Liga titles and the UEFA Cup.

In 2001, Llorente sold Gaizka Mendieta to S.S. Lazio of Italy in order to stop Real Madrid signing the player; the team from Rome agreed a €48 million deal, under the €60 million that was the midfielder's release clause. Lazio's financial problems meant that their debt to Valencia was not repaid until 2004, when the Spanish club signed players Bernardo Corradi and Stefano Fiore from their debtors.

=== President of Valencia CF ===
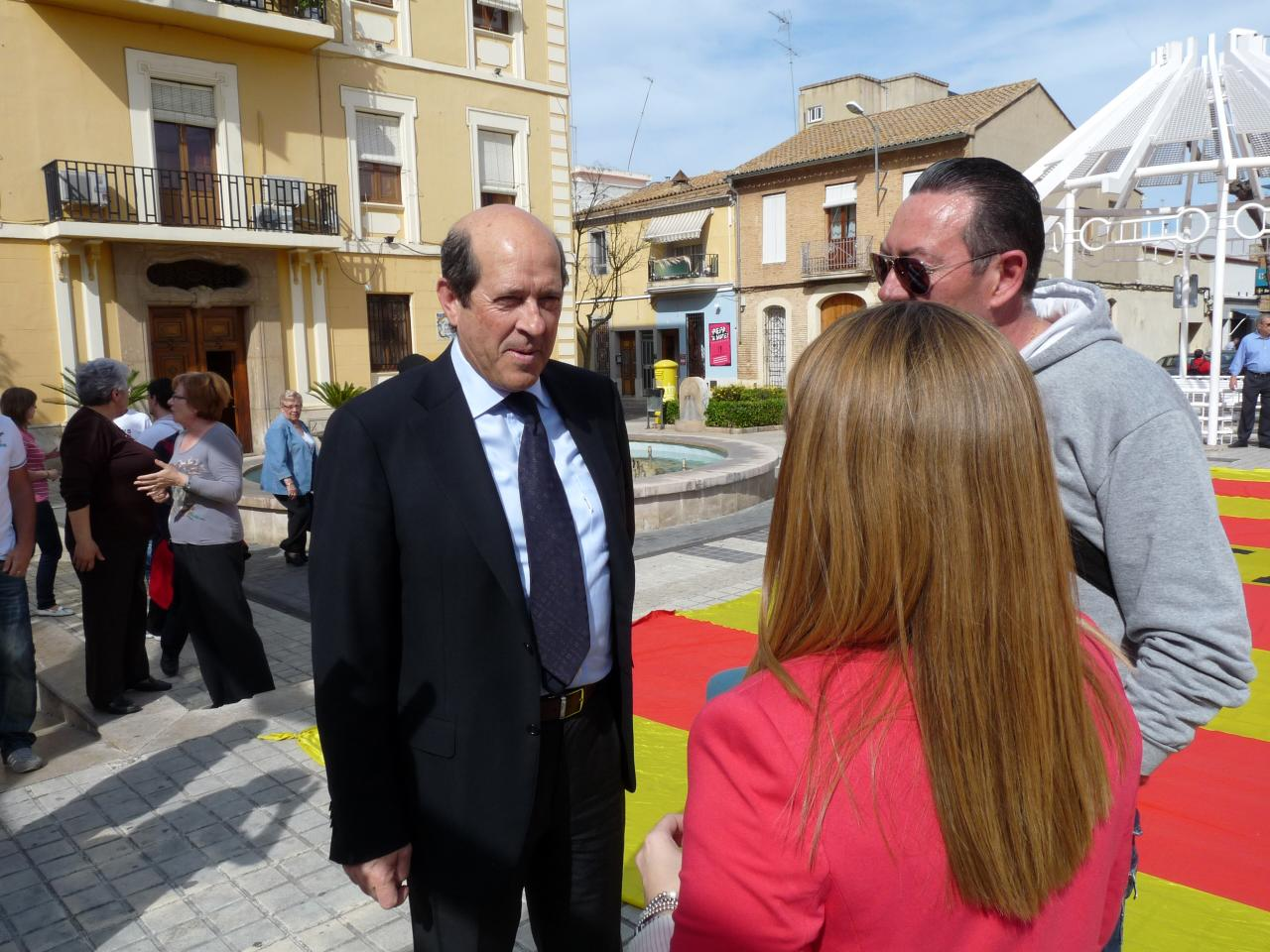
Llorente visiting the Valencia fan club in his hometown of Benetússer in March 2012

In June 2009, Llorente left his post as executive president of the Roig-owned basketball club Pamesa Valencia and returned to Valencia CF as president. By February 2012, he cut the club's debt by €200 million, to €360 million; he said that the club reduced player salaries from 110% to 78% of the budget. Part of these reductions came from selling key players such as David Villa and Juan Mata. He resigned on 5 April 2013 due to changes in the Valencia CF Foundation, the majority shareholder.

During Llorente's presidency, Valencia finished third behind FC Barcelona and Real Madrid for three consecutive seasons under manager Unai Emery; The Guardian columnist Sid Lowe wrote that the belief among fans was that Llorente renewed Emery's contract every season because there were no replacements available. In May 2012, he allowed Emery's contract to expire and hired Mauricio Pellegrino, a former Valencia player who had never managed a club before. Llorente dismissed Pellegrino in December, meaning that the manager's contracted salary would have to be paid out: €900,000 for him and €500,000 across his staff.

In December 2011, Llorente's Valencia CF reached an agreement with Bankia to finance the Nou Mestalla stadium, while the bank would take over the old Mestalla Stadium. Bankia terminated this agreement in September 2012, considering that the club had not reached the agreed milestones in construction.
