= Nou Mestalla =

Football stadium in Valencia, Spain

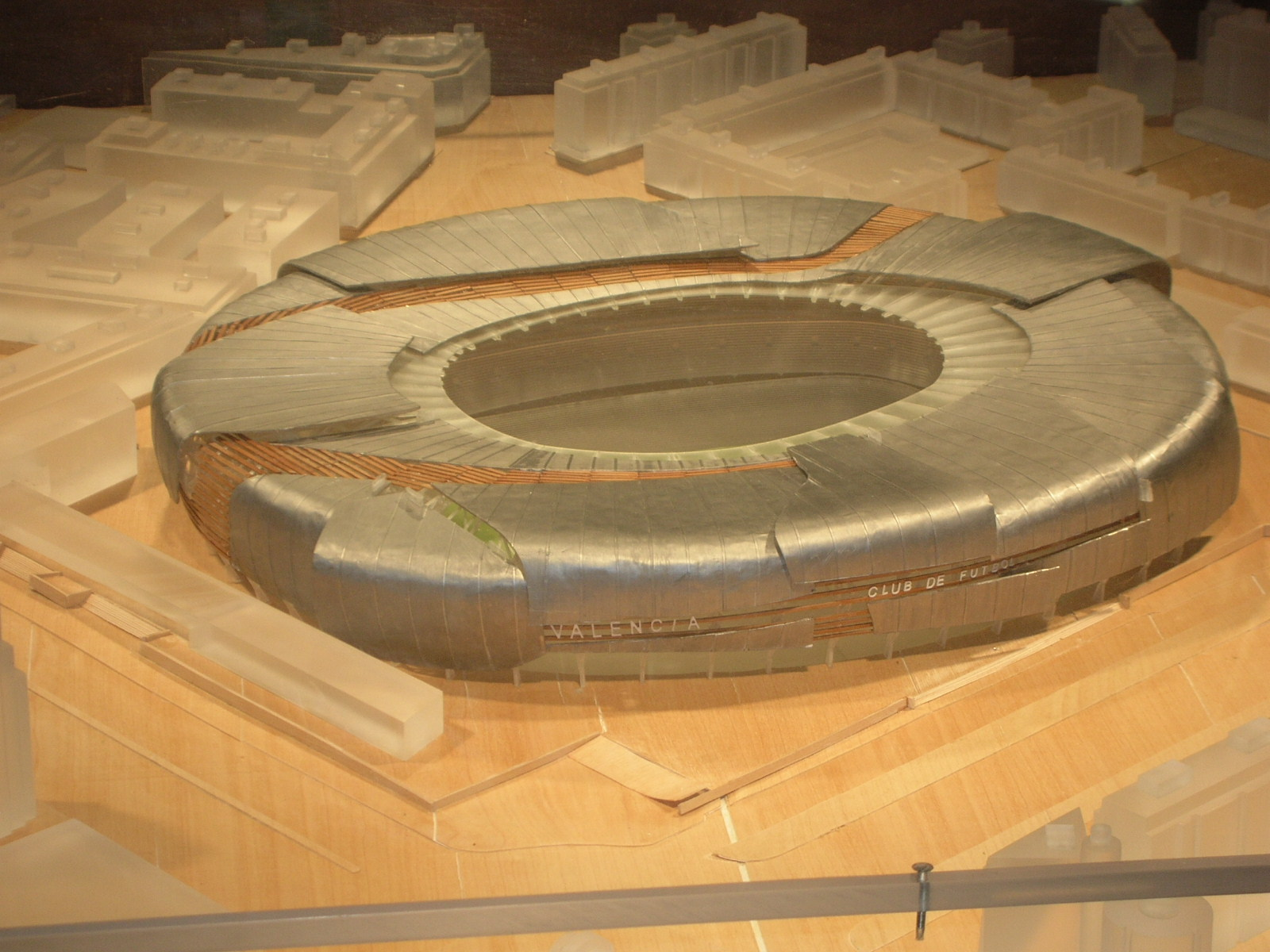
- Old model of Nou Mestalla UEFA
- Interactive map of Nou Mestalla
- Coordinates: 39°29′22″N 0°23′47″W
- Owner: Valencia
- Operator: Valencia
- Capacity: 70,044
- Surface: Grass
- Field size: 105 m × 68 m (344 ft × 223 ft)
- Public transit: Beniferri (Lines 1 and 2)

Construction
- Groundbreaking: 1 August 2007
- Built: 2025–present
- Cost: €287–350 million
- Architects: RFA Fenwick Iribarren Architects; ArupSport
- Structural engineer: Arup
- Services engineer: GI Grup

Tenants
- Valencia (Planned)

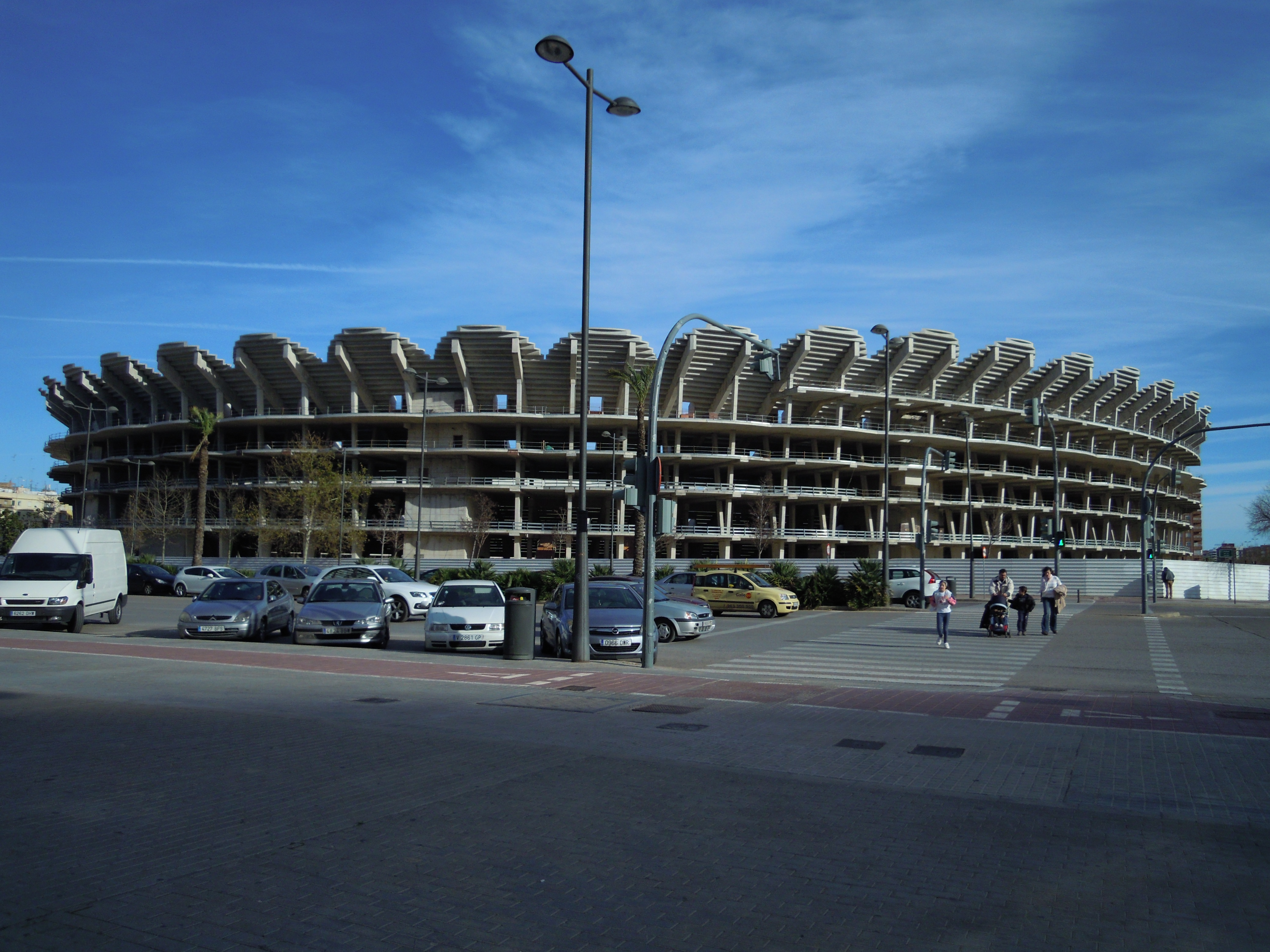
State of the stadium in 2013

Nou Mestalla (Valencian pronunciation: [ˈnɔw mesˈtaʎa]) is a partially built football stadium in Valencia, Spain, intended as a replacement for Valencia’s current stadium, the Mestalla. The basic concrete structure of the stadium was built between August 2007 and February 2009, but work was then halted for financial reasons. Following multiple redesigns the final capacity will be 70,044 with construction work eventually resumed in January 2025.

The stadium architects are Reid Fenwick Asociados and ArupSport, and the cost is estimated between €250 million and €300 million. The design features a futuristic exterior, clad in aluminium and an interior of wood. It is being built on the site of a former factory in the neighbourhood of Benicalap.

== History ==
The plans for the new stadium were unveiled on 10 November 2006, by former president Juan Soler and the club who unveiled details about the stadium and presented a short film about the stadium at the Museu Príncipe Felipe in Valencia. The work on the Nou Mestalla began in August 2007, with an intention to complete in early summer 2009, in time for the 2009–10 season. Planned capacity was around 80,000.

On 26 May 2008, four construction workers lost their lives following the collapse of some scaffolding on the Nou Mestalla site. A five-minute silence, called for by the Unión General de Trabajadores and Workers' Commissions trade unions, was observed throughout the Valencian Community in all sectors of industry.

Construction on the stadium was suspended in February 2009, due to the club struggling financially. Valencia announced in December 2011 that it had negotiated a deal with Bankia to complete the stadium and transfer the old Mestalla property to the bank, and that it expected to complete the stadium in approximately two years, but this deal later collapsed.

An updated redesign, by Fenwick Iribarren Architects, was put forward in November 2013. The capacity was to be reduced to 61,500, the underground car park reduced in size, and the original roof and elaborate façade to be scaled back, but no date was given for when construction would restart. Valencia began negotiations with Ayuntamiento of Valencia in October 2017 to renew and restart the project. Further design modifications were proposed, reducing to a capacity of 54,000 seats.

A new project to complete stadium construction was presented by then-club president Anil Murthy to President of the Generalitat Valenciana, Ximo Puig, in December 2021. This saw another change in design, reducing capacity further to somewhere between 43,000 and 50,000 seats. The stadium was included in RFEF's original bid for Spain, Portugal, and Morocco to host the 2030 FIFA World Cup in 2022, but did not make the final list when they were unveiled in July 2024 although it later joined in March 2026.

After a hiatus of almost 16 years, construction on the Nou Mestalla stadium recommenced in January 2025. Valencia are currently targeting moving into the completed stadium for the 2027–28 season. In June 2025, the club completed a €322 million financing package to resume and complete the stadium project, backed by major institutions including Goldman Sachs and La Liga.
