= Raphia =

Raphia may refer to:

- Raphia (moth), a genus of moths in the family Noctuidae
- Raffia palm, the genus Raphia of raffia palms
- Raphia (town), the Ancient Greek name for Rafah, a town in Gaza
- Battle of Raphia (217 BC), a major confrontation between the Ptolemaic and Seleucid empires.
- Battle of Raphia (720 BC), a battle between Pharonic Egypt and Assyria, during the reign of Pharaoh Osorkon IV

== See also ==
- Battle of Rafah (disambiguation), for other battles at the location of Raphia town
- Rafah (disambiguation)
- Rafa (disambiguation)
