= 2026 Real Madrid CF presidential election =

Spanish association football club election

- June 7, 2026
- Registered: 75,214
- Turnout: 33,555 (44.61%)
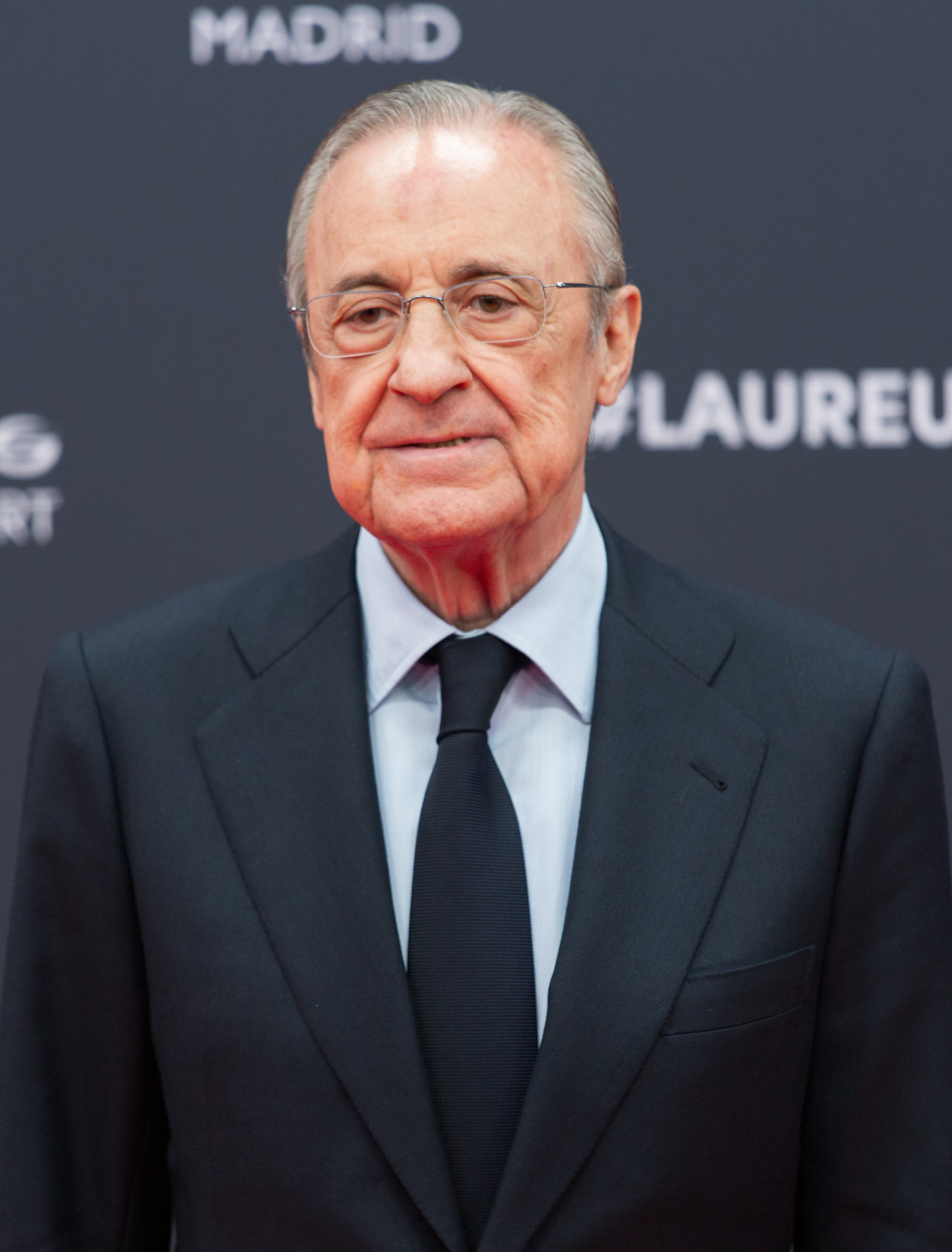
Candidate	Florentino Pérez	Enrique Riquelme
Running mate	Eduardo Fernández de Blas; Pedro López Jiménez; Enrique Sánchez González; Enrique Pérez Rodríguez	David Mesonero; Ángel Martín; F. Fernández Tapias Jr.
Popular vote	21,741	11,814
Percentage	65%	35%
President before election
Florentino Pérez
Elected President
Florentino Pérez

An election for the position of president of Real Madrid CF was held on 7 June 2026, for a term until 2030. On 12 May 2026, after the Board of Directors Meeting, the current president Florentino Pérez called for a new board of directors elections, following a trophy-less season for the club. The disappointment was deepened by back-to-back seasons without a single La Liga, Copa del Rey, or Champions League title, a drought unprecedented since the period from 2008 to 2010.

These are expected to be the first contested elections since 2006, and the third in the 21st century. On 21 May 2026, Spanish businessman Enrique Riquelme announced his candidacy. Pérez launched his re-election campaign officially on 27 May. During his campaign announcement, Pérez asserted that the opposition campaign was led by individuals from the administration of former president Ramón Calderón (2006–2009), referring to that era as the club's "darkest period."

On 24 May, the candidacy of Riquelme was accepted. Riquelme earlier ran in the 2021 elections, yet chose to withdraw promptly owing to narrow time limits and rigorous institutional mandates.

Riquelme has clarified that the club is suffering from an economic crisis and there is an intention to sell club shares, thereby opening the door to privatization, which he considers dangerous to the club’s identity, and that his election will prevent this; furthermore, the team's failure to win titles is due to Pérez focusing excessively on the European Super League, and had he been president, Barcelona would not have dared to carry out the Negreira "scandal". Riquelme also added that the club spends heavily on non-sporting activities, three times what any other club in Europe spends, questioning among other things, "Why do we spend 80 million dollars on financial consulting and third-party expenses?" Riquelme stated his determination to revive the team’s Spanish identity through a strategic mission to boost Real Madrid's representation in the national team, re-establishing the club as a key feeder for La Roja.

On 3 June, Riquelme revealed that Raúl would assume the position of Sporting Director, and Fernando Hierro would become Director of the Real Madrid academy, La Fábrica. On 5 June, Riquelme pledged to bring the German coach Jürgen Klopp, who he believes suits Real's status and ambitions.

On 4 June, Florentino Perez pledged that if elected, José Mourinho will be Real Madrid coach, as well as announcing that Ibrahima Konaté and Denzel Dumfries would be his first signings. Outside of that, he also promised that on Tuesday, 9 June, he would bid a club-record €150 million for a mystery player.

Incumbent president Florentino Pérez won the election with 21,741 votes, representing 65% of the turnout, while also winning all voting tables. Enrique conceded the loss, congratulated Pérez, and affirmed that Real shall not remain anymore 20 years without elections. He requested that the members be responsible for taking decisions and all matters connected to the club.

Voting was conducted from 9:00 AM to 8:00 PM within the Real Madrid City Basketball Pavilion.

== Results ==
Candidate	Votes	%
Florentino Pérez	21,741	64.79
Enrique Riquelme	11,814	35.21
Total	33,555	100.00
Valid votes	33,555	100.00
Invalid/blank votes	0	0.00
Total votes	33,555	100.00
Registered voters/turnout	75,214	44.61
Majority	9,927	
	Florentino Pérez hold	
