= Raffa =

Raffa may refer to:

== Places ==
- Raffa, Syria; a village in Al-Tamanah Nahiyah, Maarrat al-Nu'man District, Idlib
- Al Raffa, Dubai, United Arab Emirates

== People with the surname ==
- Raffa (surname)

== Other uses ==
- Raffa (boules), a specialty, both male and female, of boules
- Raffa (TV series), a 2023 documentary series about Italian singer and actress Raffaella Carrà

== See also ==
- Ouled Rafaa, Algeria
- Rafa (disambiguation)
- Rafah (disambiguation)
