= Fernando Martín (businessman) =

Spanish football executive (born 1947)

President of Real Madrid (unofficial)
- In office 27 February 2006 – 26 April 2006
- Preceded by: Florentino Pérez
- Succeeded by: Luis Gómez-Montejano (acting); Ramón Calderón

Personal details
- Born: Fernando Martín Álvarez; 30 May 1947 (age 78); Trigueros del Valle, Valladolid, Spain
- Occupation: Businessman

Fernando Martín Álvarez (born 30 May 1947, in Trigueros del Valle near Valladolid) is a Spanish businessman who was the unofficial President of Real Madrid, replacing Florentino Pérez who resigned on 27 February 2006, until he unexpectedly himself resigned on 26 April of the same year. Álvarez was a member of the Real Madrid board of directors under Pérez.

He has an MS degree in Chemistry, which he obtained from the University of Valladolid. Álvarez was a politician at a local level in the Christian Democratic Party which later amalgamated with the main conservative Popular Party.

In 1983, he came to Madrid to work in property and worked his way up the ladder. In 1991, he set out on his own and founded Martinsa. Álvarez owned a three percent stake in Spain's number three electricity provider Union Fenosa, also under a one percent stake in telecommunication giant Telefonica as well as Spain's top two banks Santander Central Hispano (BSCH) and Banco Bilbao Vizcaya Argentaria (BBVA). In 2005, he formed an alliance with the Nozar group to develop urban projects in and around Madrid.

Other offices
Preceded by Florentino Pérez	President of Real Madrid; 2006 (from 27 February until 26 April)	Succeeded by Luis Gómez-Montejano (acting); Ramón Calderón
