= Luis Gómez-Montejano =

Spanish football executive (1922–2017)

President of Real Madrid Acting
- In office 26 April 2006 – 2 July 2006
- Preceded by: Florentino Pérez; Fernando Martín Álvarez (unofficial)
- Succeeded by: Ramón Calderón

Personal details
- Born: 24 August 1922 Madrid, Kingdom of Spain
- Died: 5 February 2017 (aged 94) Madrid, Spain
- Occupation: Football administrator

Luis Gómez-Montejano (24 August 1922 – 5 February 2017) was a Spanish football administrator who was the Acting President of Real Madrid from 26 April 2006 until 2 July 2006.

Born in Madrid, Gómez-Montejano assumed the presidency of Real Madrid on 26 April 2006, after the resignation of Fernando Martín Álvarez, and left his post on 3 July 2006, when Ramón Calderón was elected.

Other offices
Preceded by Florentino Pérez; Fernando Martín (unofficial)	President of Real Madrid; 2006 (from 26 April to 2 July)	Succeeded by Ramón Calderón
