= Enrique Riquelme =

Spanish businessman

Enrique Riquelme (born 9 January 1989) is a Spanish businessman. He is the founder of COX Energy, a company in the renewable energy field. In 2026, he announced his candidacy for the Real Madrid Presidential Elections against current president Florentino Pérez. He was born in Cox, Alicante.

== Real Madrid presidential candidacy ==
Riquelme announced his candidacy to run for President of Real Madrid on 21 May 2026 following current president Florentino Pérez's call for new board of directors elections. This was following a trophy-less season which saw the departure of manager Xabi Alonso midway through January and the appointment of Real Madrid Castilla manager Álvaro Arbeloa. This was the first contested Real Madrid presidential election since 2006 with incumbent president Pérez being unopposed in the last five electoral cycles.

During a television appearance on 3 June, Riquelme presented a Real Madrid jersey which bore the last name of Erling Haaland on the back with Riquelme claiming that the Norwegian striker would join the club if he were elected president. Riquelme further claimed that Haaland expressed desire to play for Real Madrid and had a release clause available despite his current contract tying him with Manchester City through 2034. Both Haaland's father Alfie and his agent Rafaela Pimenta have denied the claims alongside Manchester City who expressed consideration for legal action.

Riquelme revealed that Raúl would assume the position of Sporting Director, and Fernando Hierro would become Director of the Real Madrid academy, La Fábrica. On 5 June, Riquelme pledged to bring the German coach Jürgen Klopp, who he believes suits Real's status and ambitions.

Riquelme would go on to lose the election against Pérez receiving 11,814 votes representing 35% of the total. Enrique conceded the loss and congratulated Pérez while affirming that Real shall not remain anymore 20 years without elections. He requested that the members be responsible for taking decisions and all matters connected to the club.
