= Battle of Rafah =

The Battle of Rafah primarily refers to any of the military engagements fought in and around Rafah, today in the Gaza Strip:

== Battles ==
- Battle of Raphia (720 BC), a battle between Pharonic Egypt and Assyria, at Rafah, during the reign of Pharaoh Osorkon IV
- Battle of Raphia (217 BC), a battle between the Ptolemaic Egypt and the Seleucid Empire, near Rafah
- Battle of Rafa, a World War I battle in 1917
- Battle of Rafah (1949), in context of the 1948 Arab–Israeli War
- Battle of Rafah (2009), part of internal Palestinian conflict between Hamas and Jund Ansar Allah
- Rafah offensive (2024), part of the ongoing Gaza war

== Other uses ==
- The Battle of Raphia, 217 B.C., a boardgame based on the 217 BCE battle

== See also ==
- Raphia (disambiguation)
- Rafah (disambiguation)
- Rafa (disambiguation)
