= Galácticos =

Term for a group of famous footballers recruited by a club

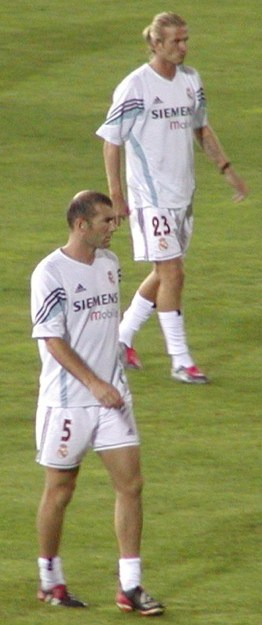
Zinedine Zidane and David Beckham with Real Madrid in 2003. Both are examples of the Galácticos policy.

Galácticos (Spanish for galactics, referring to superstars) are expensive, world-famous football players recruited during the "galácticos" policy pursued by Florentino Pérez during his presidency at Real Madrid, where in his first tenure between 2000 and 2006, he purchased at least one galáctico in the summer of every year. The club's second galáctico era began in 2009 with Pérez's return to presidency, and is considered to be more successful both economically and in terms of on-pitch achievements.

The term itself carries both positive and negative connotations. Initially, it was used to emphasise the greatness of the superstar players being signed and the construction of a world-class team. Later, the term developed a more negative connotation, with galáctico becoming associated with prima donna and being used to deride the transfer policy and team built under it, following media perception that the policy at Real in the early 2000s had failed to deliver the expected levels of success.

The term has occasionally been used to describe other teams, both in football and in other sports, that have been perceived to follow a similar policy. For example, British rugby union commentator Martin Gillingham called French club Toulon "rugby's galácticos" in 2012 due to a wave of signings of international stars by owner Mourad Boudjellal.

== Origins ==
Although the term was popularized in the 2000s, the origins of the Galáctico policy date as far back as the 1950s and 1960s, when the policy was first founded by club-president Santiago Bernabéu. Bernabéu signed multiple star players for large fees in quick succession, such as Alfredo Di Stéfano, Francisco Gento, Raymond Kopa, Héctor Rial, Ferenc Puskás and José Santamaría. This period of buying allowed Real Madrid to enjoy their finest era of dominance, winning twelve La Liga championships and six European Cups.

The Galácticos transfer policy was contrasted with the Quinta del Buitre era of the late 1980s. This saw Real Madrid playing a more physical and less appealing style of football, and had an increased emphasis on producing homegrown players such as Emilio Butragueño, Manolo Sanchís, Rafael Martín Vázquez, Míchel and Miguel Pardeza. This period allowed Real Madrid to also enjoy domestic and European success, winning five La Liga championships and two UEFA Cups.

The term Galácticos in reference to this team is often credited to Jaume Ortí, president of Valencia CF, who challenged Real Madrid to honours in the early 2000s. The term in general goes back further, with Mundo Deportivo finding a reference in 1988 describing FC Barcelona signing Julio Salinas as a Galáctico.

== First galáctico era ==
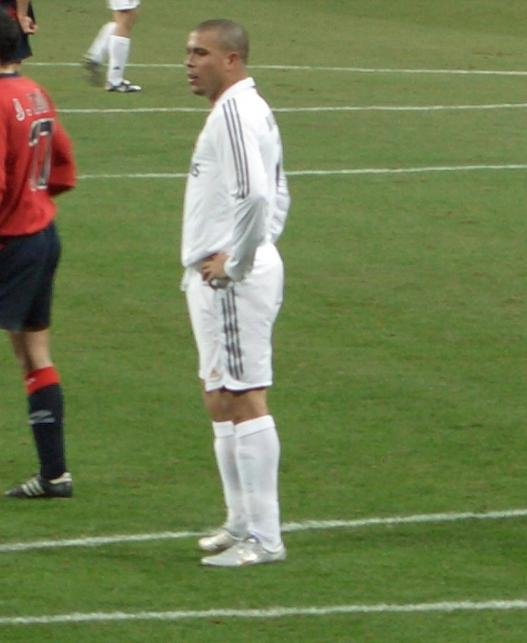

The first galáctico era is considered to be synonymous with the presidency of Florentino Pérez between 2000–2006, from the signing of Luís Figo in 2000, to the departure of Zinedine Zidane in 2006. The first Pérez era brought:

- (Portugal) Luís Figo – signed in 2000 for €60 million from Barcelona.
- (France) Claude Makélélé - signed in 2000 for €14 million from Celta de Vigo
- (France) Zinedine Zidane – signed in 2001 for €73.5 million from Juventus.
- (Brazil) Ronaldo – signed in 2002 for €45 million from Inter.
- (England) David Beckham – signed in 2003 for €37.5 million from Manchester United.
- (England) Michael Owen – signed in 2004 for €9 million from Liverpool.
- (Brazil) Robinho – signed in 2005 for €24 million from Santos.
- (Spain) Sergio Ramos – signed in 2005 for €27 million from Sevilla.

Several other players were often considered to be a part of the galácticos legacy due to their influence on the team during that period, despite being signed previously to the reign of Pérez, or being graduates of the youth system. These included:

- (Spain) Fernando Hierro – signed pre-Pérez in 1989 for €1 million from Valladolid.
- (Spain) Raúl – graduated from youth system in 1994.
- (Spain) Guti – graduated from youth system in 1995.
- (Brazil) Roberto Carlos – signed pre-Pérez in 1996 for €3.5 million from Inter.
- (Spain) Fernando Morientes – signed pre-Pérez in 1997 for €6.6 million from Zaragoza.
- (Spain) Iván Helguera – signed pre-Pérez in 1999 for €4.5 million from Espanyol.
- (Spain) Míchel Salgado – signed pre-Pérez in 1999 for €11 million from Celta.
- (England) Steve McManaman – signed pre-Pérez in 1999 for free-transfer from Liverpool.
- (Spain) Iker Casillas – graduated from youth system in 1999.

== 2000–2006: Pérez's first presidency ==
Though Real Madrid had already won two European Cups in 1998 and 2000 under the presidency of Lorenzo Sanz, Sanz lost his re-election bid to Pérez. Pérez won by promising an aggressive new transfer policy and expensive new signings, in particular, Luís Figo from rivals Barcelona.

Pérez then sold the club's training ground, the Ciudad Deportiva, for €480 million, allowing Real to clear debts, and build a replacement training complex at a fraction of the cost. It also allowed for significant funds to be used for player transfers. The deal to sell the complex was later investigated by the EU on illegal-competition grounds, however, no charges were brought.

After the purchase of Figo for €62 million, a world-record transfer fee, Pérez sought to buy at least one world-class superstar player (dubbed a galáctico) each summer. The record was broken a year later by the purchase of Zinedine Zidane from Juventus for €75 million. After a demand for youth integration in the side, which coincided with the appointment of Vicente del Bosque, the policy was redubbed as "Zidanes y Pavones", with the name deriving from Zidane and Francisco Pavón, a product from the club's youth academy — the idea was to sign one major superstar per year, and promote youth players sporadically.

Florentino Pérez was also fond of Francesco Totti, a world-class trequartista (attacking midfielder) who played for Roma at the time, and tried to sign him in order to perfect the galácticos squad, but was rejected, as the Italian number 10 remained out of loyalty to his Roman club. Totti has stated in an interview that the Los Blancos even sent him "a No.10 shirt with ‘Totti’ on it" to show their earnestness.

=== Initial success ===
Immediate success followed for three seasons, with Real winning La Liga in 2000–01 and 2002–03, and claiming the UEFA Champions League in 2001–02, with Zidane scoring the winning goal in the final. After winning the 2002–03 La Liga title, Real Madrid added English midfielder David Beckham from Manchester United for €35 million. Beckham's status as a world-class footballer, in addition to his heavily publicized marriage to pop star Victoria Adams, resulted in Real Madrid gaining great advertising potential around the world, especially in Asia. By further promoting the other superstar players in various marketing campaigns in the continent, the club became the world's richest club in terms of revenue in 2005–06.

Despite expectations of continued dominance in domestic and European competition, the club failed to win any trophy for the next three seasons. They also suffered from elimination in the UEFA Champions League, exiting in the 2004 quarter-finals, and two consecutive exits in Round of 16 in 2005 and 2006. In the same period, Barcelona won successive La Liga titles in 2005 and 2006, along with the Champions League in 2006.

=== Perceived failure ===
Several reasons have been proposed in the media for the failure of the galáctico policy:

- A lack of interest in defensive talent harmed the team, as potential transfers were overlooked because Pérez did not want to pay large wages to defensive players. Shortly after signing Beckham, Claude Makélélé departed the team when the club refused to raise his relatively low salary, despite him being widely considered as one of the best defensive midfielders in the world and key to the team. Negotiations to sign Patrick Vieira from Arsenal in 2004 failed for similar reasons. The defensive players signed by Pérez during this period, namely Walter Samuel, Thomas Gravesen, Jonathan Woodgate, Cicinho, Carlos Diogo and Pablo García, all for high fees, underperformed while playing for the club, with Woodgate seeming the only potential success, his time being compounded by severe injuries. Sergio Ramos, who joined Real Madrid for €27 million in the summer of 2005 from Sevilla, failed to shine until Pérez's departure in 2006. Pavón, one-half of the Zidanes y Pavones policy, never lived up to expectation and left the club in 2007.
- The shock firing of coach Vicente del Bosque, who won two Champions League titles, and led Real Madrid to their 29th league championship in the 2002–03 season. It has been suggested that there was a political split, with del Bosque and his players (namely Hierro, Morientes, Steve McManaman and Makélélé), against the policy Pérez instituted. Three of the aforementioned players had backed a significant wage raise for Makélélé, and they all left the club shortly after del Bosque's departure. More importantly, del Bosque was able to balance the many different egos of the players in the star studded team, considering that several galácticos were all competing for the same position. Without del Bosque, the superstar players placed together failed to form a cohesive footballing unit, indicating that having a large number of very talented, renowned individual footballers did not effectively translate into a great footballing team.
- Lack of stability and interference by Pérez, who appointed Carlos Queiroz, an assistant manager at United, in the week following the arrival of Beckham and dismissal of del Bosque. Queiroz was allegedly forced to pick the star players, regardless of form or performance on the pitch in order to maximise on marketing potential, and had limited input into tactical decisions. McManaman later described this as the "Disneyfication of Real Madrid" in his autobiography. Queiroz was later fired after only one trophyless season in 2003–04, with Real suffering in subsequent years from high turnover in non-playing staff, with four managers and four directors of football in the four years following del Bosque's firing in 2003.
- Signings for non-footballing (marketing) reasons, namely in regards to Beckham. Beckham, a natural right winger, joined the club partly due to his huge popularity in Asia. This meant Figo, another right winger already at the club, had to compete for a starting berth at the club. The signings of two high-profile players in the same position meant one or the other was forced to play out of position in many games, with Beckham in central-defensive midfield when Figo was on the right, or Figo on the left or centre when Beckham occupied the right. One former club director also reportedly quoted saying that Beckham was signed for his good looks and Ronaldinho, who joined Barcelona the same summer, was too "ugly" to play for Real Madrid. While Real Madrid failed to win any trophy for three straight seasons, Ronaldinho would lead the powerful resurgence of Barcelona; and furthermore he proved to be one of the most marketable players during that time.
- The 2003 pre-season Asian tour catered more to the needs of the club's marketing than to its players' preparations. Shortly after Beckham joined the club, the team embarked on an 18-day summer tour in Asia, to cash in on his worldwide appeal. It included exhibition matches in Beijing, Tokyo, Hong Kong and Bangkok, which alone earned the club €10 million. Some have compared this tour with the first visit of The Beatles to the United States in 1964. Although lucrative and generating wide publicity, the preparation value of preseason in Asia was questionable, as the team failed to adequately prepare for the following season. It was exhausting for the players, as endless rounds of publicity engagements and restrictions on the players' freedom of movement (due to the team hotel being besieged by fans). Most players admitted that they would have preferred a low-profile training camp and/or to have been home in Spain for the pre-season, instead of playing meaningless show matches against low quality opponents.
- Poor transfer decisions, namely in regards to Samuel Eto'o. Real Madrid owned 50% of the contract Eto'o signed with Mallorca since 1998, and had first preference over where he could sign if he chose to leave Mallorca. Pérez sold these rights to Eto'o in 2004, arguing that Real Madrid already had the best two strikers in the league (Ronaldo and Raúl), and that there was no place for another forward. Eto'o himself also ruled out a move back to the club for similar reasons, despite Real Madrid signing another forward in Michael Owen that same summer. Eto'o would later join Barcelona, and lead them to 2004–05, 2005–06 and 2008–09 La Liga titles, as well as 2005–06 and 2008–09 Champions League titles. Meanwhile, Owen, the alternative signing to Eto'o, left after one season after failing to secure a starting berth at Real.

=== End of the first era ===
The decline in the team's on-field performance had seemingly hit a nadir in the 2005–06 season, crashing out of the Champions League to Arsenal in the Round of 16 without scoring a goal in either leg. Despite the new signings, which included Júlio Baptista (€24 million), Robinho (€30 million), and Sergio Ramos (€27 million), Real Madrid suffered from some poor results, including a 0–3 loss at the hands of Barcelona at the Santiago Bernabéu in November 2005. Madrid's coach Wanderley Luxemburgo was sacked the following month and his replacement was Juan Ramón López Caro. A brief return to form came to an abrupt halt after Madrid lost the first leg of the Copa del Rey semi-finals 6–1 to Real Zaragoza, a defeat that was nearly reversed with a 4–0 home victory. This foresaw Pérez resigning as club president on February 27, 2006, and was succeeded by Ramón Calderón.

The final season of the galáctico era is considered to be the 2006–07 season. Fabio Cannavaro and Ruud van Nistelrooy were brought in for a combined fee of €21 million, while Zidane and Ronaldo both departed, with the former retiring. The incoming transfers were notable in the fact that less media attention or marketing was involved in the signing of these players; Cannavaro had been fresh off captaining Italy to the 2006 FIFA World Cup, but had left Juventus after it was relegated to Serie B, while Van Nistelrooy had fallen out of favour at Manchester United. Both signings were seen as needed for the team, which lacked stability in both attack and defence in the season prior.

Following Pérez's departure, Calderón hired Fabio Capello with a mandate of "reining in the players and clearing out dead wood". Capello balanced the team out and moved away from the galáctico approach enforced previously, with Capello famously dropping Beckham for periods of the season, due to form and inability to be integrated into the starting eleven. However, Beckham was returned to the team during the second half of the season, and was widely considered by many to be one of their better performers at the time. The team's performance in the Champions League still disappointed, with their elimination to Bayern Munich on the away goals rule: the team initially enjoyed a 3–2 first leg win at home, but lost the second leg away 2–1, with Roberto Carlos failing to control the ball on kickoff which led to Roy Makaay scoring in 10.12 seconds, the fastest Champions League goal in history. Domestically, the team finally overtook Barcelona and won La Liga, but Capello was sacked at the conclusion of the season.

The nail in the coffin of the end of the first galáctico era is considered to be the departure of Beckham to join Major League Soccer (MLS) side LA Galaxy after the 2006–07 season. Beckham's contract was due to expire after that season, and Calderón favored re-signing him, however, Beckham derided his treatment, and benching, by Capello, who later responded publicly saying that Beckham would get no further chances on the first team, although he was later forced to backtrack on that declaration. Beckham was also the last of the big four to move on, with Figo having joined Inter Milan two seasons prior, Zidane retiring after the 2006 World Cup, and Ronaldo moving to A.C. Milan half a season before Beckham's departure. Capello was then replaced by Bernd Schuster, who led the team to the second consecutive La Liga title in 2007–08 and a Supercopa de España at the beginning of the 2008–09 season. However, Madrid continued to fail in the Champions League, with consecutive round of 16 exits, and couldn't produce stable results on the domestic front either, with multiple early Copa del Rey eliminations and Barcelona regaining dominance in the La Liga.

== Second galáctico era ==
=== The second galácticos (2009–2018) ===
- (Brazil) Kaká – signed in 2009 for €67 million from Milan
- (France) Karim Benzema – signed in 2009 for €30 million from Lyon
- (Portugal) Cristiano Ronaldo – signed in 2009 for €94 million from Manchester United
- (Spain) Xabi Alonso – signed in 2009 for €35.5 million from Liverpool
- (Argentina) Ángel Di María – signed in 2010 for €25 million from Benfica
- (Germany) Mesut Özil – signed in 2010 for €15 million from Werder Bremen
- (Croatia) Luka Modrić – signed in 2012 for €32 million from Tottenham Hotspur
- (Spain) Isco – signed in 2013 for €30 million from Málaga
- (Wales) Gareth Bale – signed in 2013 for €100 million from Tottenham Hotspur
- (Germany) Toni Kroos – signed in 2014 for €30 million from Bayern Munich
- (Colombia) James Rodríguez – signed in 2014 for €76 million from Monaco

Several other players are considered to be a part of the galácticos legacy due to their influence on the team during that period despite either being signed previously to Pérez's presidency, being graduates of the Madrid youth system, or being players more focused on defending than attacking; these often include:

- (Spain) Iker Casillas – part of the first galácticos.
- (Spain) Sergio Ramos – part of the first galácticos.
- (Portugal) Pepe – signed pre-Pérez in 2007 for €30 million from Porto
- (Brazil) Marcelo – signed pre-Pérez in 2007 for €6.5 million from Fluminense
- (Argentina) Gonzalo Higuaín – signed pre-Pérez in 2007 for €12 million from River Plate
- (Spain) Álvaro Arbeloa – graduated from youth system in 2006 and bought back in 2009 for €5 million from Liverpool
- (France) Raphaël Varane – signed in 2011 for €10 million from Lens
- (Spain) Dani Carvajal – graduated from youth system in 2012 and bought back in 2013 for €6.5 million from Bayer Leverkusen
- (Brazil) Casemiro – signed in 2013 for €6 million from São Paulo
- (Costa Rica) Keylor Navas – signed in 2014 for €10 million from Levante

== 2009–2018: Pérez's second presidency ==
=== Background: 2008–09 season ===
The 2008–09 season saw Real Madrid eclipsed by rivals Barcelona, who completed their treble, including beating Real to win La Liga by a wide margin of nine points. Real were humbled in the Champions League first knockout round by Liverpool, suffering a 1–0 loss at the Santiago Bernabéu and a heavy 4–0 defeat at Anfield. The defeat marked the fifth successive season of early Champions League exits in the round of 16, with Real not making the quarter-finals since 2004. To make things worse, they lost both their El Clásico matches and crashed out of the Copa del Rey to third tier side Real Unión. The team was widely derided in the press. Manager Bernd Schuster was sacked midway through the 2008–09 season, with the team perceptibly in decline despite the efforts of Juande Ramos, who kept the team with 19 successive victories, shortening the deficit to only six points (initially, Barcelona led by 12). It was all brought to an end when a rampant Barcelona later defeated an exposed Real 2–6, with Lionel Messi, Xavi and Thierry Henry being the stars.

In addition, Real Madrid president Ramón Calderón resigned in January 2009 after corruption allegations and having failed to secure notable transfer targets for the club.

=== 2009–10 season ===
The resignation of Ramón Calderón resulted in a presidential election in mid-2009, returning Florentino Pérez to the presidency. Pérez again pledged to go on a spending spree to return the club to European and domestic competitiveness, notably with his vocal claims of an attempt to sign AC Milan's Kaká. Just 24 hours after his appointment, Manuel Pellegrini was unveiled as Juande Ramos' replacement as manager. After much speculation linking him to the club, Kaká was duly signed for a then-world record fee of £56 million on 9 June 2009.

Then, on 11 June, Manchester United revealed they had accepted a shock offer of £80 million (a new world record transfer fee) for Cristiano Ronaldo. United gave Real until 30 June to complete the deal, and on 26 June, Real Madrid and United signed the final agreement for the transfer of Ronaldo, which became effective on 1 July. That same day, it was confirmed that Olympique Lyonnais had accepted an offer from Madrid for Karim Benzema. On 29 July 2009, it was announced that Real and Liverpool had reached an agreement for the transfer of Álvaro Arbeloa to the Spanish club for a fee of €4 million, the same amount Liverpool paid for the player in January 2007; Arbeloa subsequently signed a five-year contract with Real.

On 4 August, Real Madrid and Liverpool again agreed terms for the transfer of Xabi Alonso to the Santiago Bernabéu for a fee of €34 million. Other players that came to Real Madrid included Raúl Albiol, Ezequiel Garay and Esteban Granero. Antonio Adán became the third goalkeeper through the youth system. Newly hired manager Manuel Pellegrini was under heavy pressure to deliver instant success following the high-profile off-season signings.

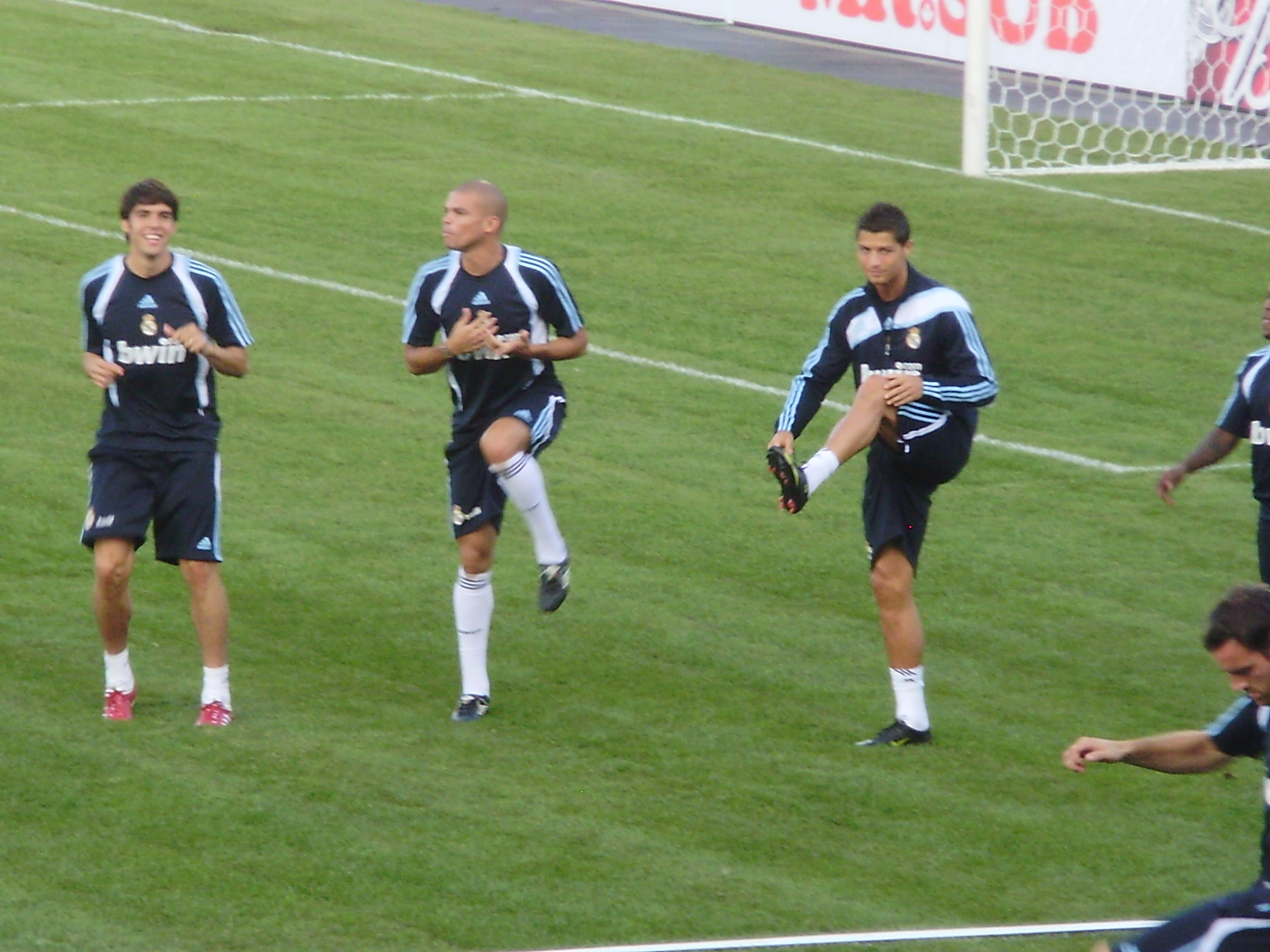
Kaká (left) and Cristiano Ronaldo (right) are two galácticos.

In their first year, the second era of galácticos failed to win any trophies. They were crushed 4–0 against Alcorcón in the Copa del Rey (ultimately losing 4–1 on aggregate), then were knocked out of the Champions League in the round of 16 for the sixth consecutive year (losing to Lyon 2–1 on aggregate), after which Pellegrini received an ultimatum from club president Pérez that Real would have to win La Liga or he would be sacked. Ending the domestic season, Real Madrid set a club record of 96 points, with 31 wins and 102 goals scored, but nonetheless finished second in La Liga to defending champions Barcelona. Madrid also had the misfortune to become the runners-up with the highest points total in the history of Europe's top five leagues, until surpassed by Liverpool's 97 points in 2018–19.

Once again, Real Madrid suffered from poor transfer decisions, as Wesley Sneijder and Arjen Robben, who were transferred to Inter Milan and Bayern Munich respectively because they were considered surplus to requirements, each played key roles as their clubs reached the 2010 Champions League final at the Santiago Bernabéu.

=== 2010–11 season ===
Manuel Pellegrini was sacked and José Mourinho was appointed manager. Even before the 2009–10 season had concluded, the team was actively courting Mourinho, who had successfully managed Inter Milan to a final victory over Barça in the Champions League (Los Blancos fans were pleased that this denied Barça the opportunity to win the Champions League at the Bernabéu) en route to achieving a continental treble. Mourinho was released by Inter after a record-breaking compensation package was agreed on 27 May 2010.

Though a manager and not a player, Mourinho has often been referred to as a galáctico. He was in high demand as a football manager for his past successes, having earlier in his career led an unfancied Porto to consecutive European trophies, then at Chelsea and Inter took underachieving squads to domestic and European successes. While Real Madrid wanted to make his arrival a media frenzy, Mourinho vetoed the club's plans which supposedly would have involved a giant catwalk or parading a massive white shirt across the pitch. Florentino Pérez was absent during the simple media presentation announcing Mourinho's appointment; only director general Jorge Valdano, the media and Mourinho were present. This suggested an apparent power shift, with Real Madrid "having at long last allowed a coach [Mourinho] the freedom to build the squad".

Real Madrid continued the spending spree by signing players Ángel Di María, Sergio Canales, Pedro León, Ricardo Carvalho, Sami Khedira and Mesut Özil. Khedira and Özil had just earlier played key roles in Germany's third-place finish at the 2010 World Cup. On 20 April 2011, the second galácticos era managed to win their first trophy, a 1–0 victory over Barcelona in the final of the Copa del Rey, with Cristiano Ronaldo scoring the decisive goal in extra time. They also managed to get past the round of 16 of the UEFA Champions League for the first time in seven years, reaching the semi-finals where they lost to eventual champions Barça. In La Liga, they finished as runners-up to Barça with 92 points, being defeated 0–5 in the 13th round, and drawing 1–1 in the 32nd round, thus achieving their first point in the last six matches against the Azulgranas.

May 2011 saw the appointment of former galáctico Zinedine Zidane as general manager of the club, replacing Jorge Valdano.

=== 2011–12 season ===
In the 2011–12 season, Real Madrid won its 32nd title, under the management of José Mourinho, with a national record of 100 points, a record 121 goals scored, a record goal difference of +89 and the most away wins among several other records in a single La Liga season. The key moment was the 2–1 win over Barça at Nou Camp on 21 April, Barça's first home loss of the season, which extended Real Madrid's lead in the table to seven points with four matches left, and led to Barça coach Pep Guardiola conceding the league title. In the Champions League, the team reached the semi-finals where they faced Bayern Munich (managed by Jupp Heynckes, who had previously led Real Madrid to its 1998 Champions League title), losing the first leg 2–1 and winning the second leg at home 2–1 (with former Real Madrid player Arjen Robben converting a penalty to level the aggregate score). Bayern won 3–1 in the ensuing penalty shootout which saw spot kicks of galácticos Cristiano Ronaldo and Kaká saved by Bayern's Manuel Neuer, as well as a missed penalty by Sergio Ramos.

=== 2012–13 season ===
Real Madrid started the 2012–13 season by winning the Supercopa de España, defeating Barcelona on away goals. However, the super cup turned out to be their only trophy of the season, despite being close to winning them all. Real finished runners-up to Barça in La Liga, accumulating 85 points, and reached the semi-finals of the UEFA Champions League for the third year in a row, where they were eliminated by Borussia Dortmund 3–4 on aggregate. Madrid also entered the Copa del Rey in the round of 32, going on a memorable run to the final, which saw them defeat Barcelona in the semi-finals before losing to Atlético Madrid 1–2 a.e.t. in the final in a heartbreaking fashion. A major transfer of the season was the signing of Luka Modrić from Tottenham Hotspur for a fee in the region of £33 million. After the loss to Atlético in the Copa del Rey final, Pérez announced the departure of José Mourinho at the end of the season by "mutual agreement". Real Madrid beat Barcelona in three of their six meetings that season (2–1 in Supercopa at home, 3–1 in the Copa del Rey away, 2–1 in the league at home), drawing two (2–2 in the league away, 1–1 in the Copa del Rey at home) and losing once (2–3 in the Supercopa away). The most striking victory came in the 2012–13 Copa del Rey semi-finals where Madrid knocked out defending champions Barcelona 4–2 on aggregate by winning 3–1 at Camp Nou (with two goals from Cristiano Ronaldo) after a 1–1 draw at the Bernabéu. The third win over Barcelona came in the 26th round of La Liga, where Real defeated them 2–1 with goals scored by Karim Benzema and Sergio Ramos.

Mourinho's last year, however, saw infighting between him and several galácticos like Iker Casillas, Sergio Ramos, Pepe and Cristiano Ronaldo. Mourinho's selection policy generated controversy; long-time Real Madrid player and club captain Casillas had been sidelined since January 2013 despite recovering from a broken hand, in favor of Diego López, who had been in fine form in the domestic and European campaign during Casillas' absence.

In the Champions League, Real Madrid defeated Manchester United, drawing the first leg at the Bernabeu 1–1 and then producing a comeback 2–1 win at Old Trafford (which was marred by controversy over a red card being issued to Manchester United player Nani), with Cristiano Ronaldo scoring in both legs. The team reached their third consecutive Champions League semi-finals, though Borussia Dortmund beat Real in the first leg 4–1 with Robert Lewandowski scoring four goals, leading Dortmund manager Jürgen Klopp to remark that it was a historic night for his club, saying, "That was like Robin Hood taking from the rich" (Dortmund had previously gone with an expensive group of largely foreign players but after almost going bankrupt had restructured back to financial health largely via young home-grown players). Real's 2–0 home win in the second leg with two late goals was not enough to overturn Dortmund's 4–3 aggregate advantage.

Real advanced to the Copa del Rey final against city rival Atlético Madrid after defeating Barcelona 4–2 on aggregate in the semi-finals. However, Real Madrid fell short of clinching the trophy, being denied by a man-of-the match performance of goalkeeper Thibaut Courtois, as Atletico scored in extra time to win 2–1. Mourinho, despite having signed a four-year contract extension in 2012, departed Real Madrid by mutual agreement with the club at the conclusion of the 2012–13 season, amid feuds with key players Iker Casillas, Sergio Ramos and Pepe.

=== 2013–14 season ===
On 25 June 2013, Carlo Ancelotti became the manager of Real Madrid after signing a three-year deal. A day later, he was introduced at his first press conference for Madrid, where it was announced that both Zinedine Zidane and Paul Clement will be his assistants. On 1 September 2013, the long-awaited transfer of Gareth Bale from Tottenham Hotspur was announced, with Bale joining Karim Benzema and Cristiano Ronaldo in the Madrid attack. The transfer of the Welshman was reportedly a new world record, with the transfer price around €100 million. In Ancelotti's first season at the club, Real Madrid won the Copa del Rey, with Bale scoring the winner in the final against Barcelona. On 24 May 2014, Real Madrid defeated city rivals Atlético Madrid in the Champions League final, winning their first European title since 2002, and they became the first team to win ten European Cups, an achievement known as La Décima. Real Madrid's attacking trio of Bale, Benzema and Cristiano, dubbed the "BBC", finished the season with 97 goals.

=== 2014–15 season ===
On 12 August 2014, Real Madrid won the UEFA Super Cup against the 2013–14 UEFA Europa League champions Sevilla by a score of 2–0. Cristiano Ronaldo scored both of Madrid's goals to win the club's 78th official trophy. In the Supercopa de España, against Atlético, Real finished their home leg with 1–1 after goals from James Rodríguez and Raúl García going into the Vicente Calderón Stadium. Mario Mandžukić shocked Real early on after just two minutes in the second leg with the only goal of the match, which meant that Atlético won the title. In the last match of the season, Martin Ødegaard became Real Madrid's youngest ever player to play in La Liga.

=== 2015–16 season ===
On 4 January 2016, it was announced that Rafael Benitez was sacked and replaced by Zinedine Zidane. On 28 May 2016, Real Madrid defeated city rivals Atlético Madrid in the Champions League final, winning their eleventh European title.

=== 2016–17 season ===
On 2 May 2017, Ronaldo scored yet another hat-trick and Madrid ran away with a thumping 3–0 victory against Atlético Madrid in the first leg of the Champions League semi-finals. On 6 May 2017, a brace apiece from Morata and Rodríguez against Granada guided Madrid to a 4–0 victory. On 10 May 2017, an Isco goal was enough for Madrid to reach the Champions League final, despite Atlético winning the second leg 2–1, meaning that Real advanced by an aggregate score of 4–2. On 14 May 2017, a Ronaldo brace and goals from Nacho and Kroos secured Real a 4–1 win over Sevilla. On 17 May 2017, two goals from Ronaldo and one from each Benzema and Kroos got Madrid a 4–1 away victory in the rescheduled match at Celta Vigo. That win gave Madrid the lead in the league table, with one game left. On 21 May 2017, a 2–0 win over Málaga, with goals from Ronaldo and Benzema, secured the 33rd league title for the club.

On 3 June 2017, Real Madrid won the 2016–17 UEFA Champions League, defeating Juventus 4–1 in the final, with a brace from Ronaldo and goals from Casemiro and Asensio. Real won their second consecutive, third in four years and twelfth overall title. With that victory, Madrid also became the first team to defend their title in the Champions League era.

=== 2017–18 season ===
Real Madrid won the Champions League for the third time in a row by defeating Liverpool 3–1 in the final, becoming the first team to achieve that feat since 1976. This was also Madrid's fourth European Cup in five years, signifying a period of unparalleled dominance unseen since Madrid's own dominance in the 1950s and 60s.

Zidane's and Ronaldo's departures after the season concluded marked the end of the Second Galáctico Era that yielded four Champions League titles, two La Liga titles, two Copa del Rey, two Supercopa de España, three UEFA Super Cups, and four FIFA Club World Cup titles. The team was instrumental in ending Barcelona's dominance, despite the Blaugrana boasting arguably the greatest collection of talent in history, and overshadowed the Catalans on the European stage. Real Madrid was also somewhat notoriously unlucky in its league campaigns throughout these nine years, finishing runners-up with 96, 92 (twice), and 90 points, as well as on 87 points in third place, just three off the league winners - despite better international records, Real was still behind Barcelona in the La Liga.

== Third galáctico era ==
=== The third galácticos (2018–present) ===
- (Belgium) Thibaut Courtois – signed in 2018 for €35 million from Chelsea
- (Brazil) Vinícius Júnior – signed in 2018 for €46 million from Flamengo
- (Brazil) Rodrygo – signed in 2018 for €40 million from Santos
- (France) Ferland Mendy – in 2019 for €53 million from Lyon
- (Brazil) Éder Militão – signed in 2019 for €50 million from Porto
- (France) Eduardo Camavinga – signed in 2021 for €31 million from Rennes
- (Germany) Antonio Rüdiger – signed in 2022 for free from Chelsea
- (France) Aurélien Tchouaméni – signed in 2022 for €80 million from Monaco
- (England) Jude Bellingham – signed in 2023 for €103 million from Borussia Dortmund
- (Turkey) Arda Güler – signed in 2023 for €20 million from Fenerbahçe
- (France) Kylian Mbappé – signed in 2024 for free from Paris Saint-Germain
- (Brazil) Endrick – signed in 2024 for €60 million from Palmeiras
- (England) Trent Alexander-Arnold – signed in 2025 for €10 million from Liverpool
- (Spain) Dean Huijsen – signed in 2025 for €62.5 million from Bournemouth
- (France) Ibrahima Konaté – signed in 2026 for free from Liverpool
- (Portugal) Bernardo Silva – signed in 2026 for free from Manchester City
- (Netherlands) Denzel Dumfries – signed in 2026 for €20 million from Inter Milan
- (Spain) Marc Cucurella - signed in 2026 for €60 million from Chelsea
- (Ivory Coast) Yan Diomande - signed in 2026 for €125 million from RB Leipzig

Several other players are considered to be a part of the third galácticos due to their influence on the team during that period despite either being signed previously to the second Galácticos, being graduates of the Madrid youth system, or being players more focused on defending than attacking; these often include:

- (France) Karim Benzema – part of the second galácticos
- (Brazil) Marcelo – signed pre-Pérez in 2007, part of the second galácticos
- (Germany) Toni Kroos – part of the second galácticos
- (Croatia) Luka Modrić – part of the second galácticos
- (Spain) Dani Carvajal – Graduate of Real Madrid's academy, part of the second galácticos

== Honours ==
=== First galáctico era ===
- La Liga:
  - Winners (3): 2000–01, 2002–03, 2006–07
  - Runners-up (2): 2004–05, 2005–06
- Copa del Rey:
  - Runners-up (2): 2001–02, 2003–04
- Supercopa de España:
  - Winners (2): 2001, 2003
- UEFA Champions League:
  - Winners (1): 2001–02
- UEFA Super Cup:
  - Winners (1): 2002
  - Runners-up (1): 2000
- Intercontinental Cup:
  - Winners (1): 2002
  - Runners-up (1): 2000

=== Second galáctico era ===
- La Liga:
  - Winners (2): 2011–12, 2016–17
  - Runners-up (5): 2009–10, 2010–11, 2012–13, 2014–15, 2015–16
- Copa del Rey:
  - Winners (2): 2010–11, 2013–14
  - Runners-up (1): 2012–13
- Supercopa de España:
  - Winners (2): 2012, 2017
  - Runners-up (2): 2011, 2014
- UEFA Champions League:
  - Winners (4): 2013–14, 2015–16, 2016–17, 2017–18
- UEFA Super Cup:
  - Winners (3): 2014, 2016, 2017
  - Runners-up (1): 2018
- FIFA Club World Cup:
  - Winners (4): 2014, 2016, 2017, 2018

=== Third galáctico era ===
- La Liga:
  - Winners (3): 2019–20, 2021–22, 2023–24
  - Runners-up (4): 2020–21, 2022–23, 2024–25, 2025–26
- Copa del Rey:
  - Winners (1): 2022–23
- Supercopa de España:
  - Winners (3): 2020, 2022, 2024
  - Runners-up (3): 2023, 2025, 2026
- UEFA Champions League:
  - Winners (2): 2021–22, 2023–24
- UEFA Super Cup:
  - Winners (2): 2022, 2024
  - Runners-up (1): 2018
- FIFA Club World Cup:
  - Winners (1): 2022
- FIFA Intercontinental Cup:
  - Winners (1): 2024
