= Pedro Cortés (businessman) =

Spanish businessman (born 1948)

Pedro Cortés García (born 1948) is a Spanish businessman who was the president of Valencia CF in 1986 and from 1997 to 2001. During his mandate, the club won the Copa del Rey and Supercopa de España in 1999, and reached two consecutive UEFA Champions League finals. From 2002, he was a delegate for the Royal Spanish Football Federation. He resigned in 2021 after being accused of sexual abuse, for which he was convicted in 2023.

== Early and personal life ==
Cortés was born in 1948 in Valencia and moved to Germany when he was 12. Fleeing Francoist Spain, he did manual labour in Germany. He married in 1974 and had three children. His son of the same name died of a heart attack in July 2017, at the age of 42.

== Career ==
Cortés ran Seur, a courier company. He was briefly president of Valencia CF in 1986 while they were in the Segunda División, and later saved the presidency of Francisco Roig Alfonso by supporting him, earning him the vice presidency. He succeeded Roig upon his resignation in 1997. Under his mandate, the club won the Copa del Rey and Supercopa de España in 1999, as well as reaching consecutive finals of the UEFA Champions League in 2000 and 2001. He worked with two managers, Claudio Ranieri and Héctor Cúper, and neither were fired. He resigned in July 2001 and was succeeded by Jaume Ortí.

After leaving Valencia, Royal Spanish Football Federation (RFEF) president Ángel Villar named Cortés as a delegate, beginning at the 2002 FIFA World Cup in South Korea and Japan. He went with the team on their winning 2010 FIFA World Cup campaign in South Africa.

== Conviction ==
In November 2020, a 16-year-old male footballer reported Cortés to the police over sexual touching. He resigned as a delegate for the RFEF the following January. In October 2021, Cortés was charged. In March 2023, he was convicted and sentenced to 18 months in prison, but did not go to prison due to paying €6,000 in compensation and accepting a restraining order and three-year communication ban.
