= CAGS =

CAGS may refer to:

- Centre for Arab Genomic Studies, the centre studying genomic disorders among Arabs.
- Coronary artery graft surgery, a medical procedure to treat coronary artery disease.
- Certificate of Advanced Graduate Study, a certificate earned after the receipt of a Master's degree.
- Canadian Association of General Surgeons
- Cobram Anglican Grammar School, a grammar school in Cobram, Australia
