= Lihadh Al-Gazali =

British Iraqi geneticist

Lihadh Al-Gazali FRCP, FRCPCH
- لحاظ الغزالي
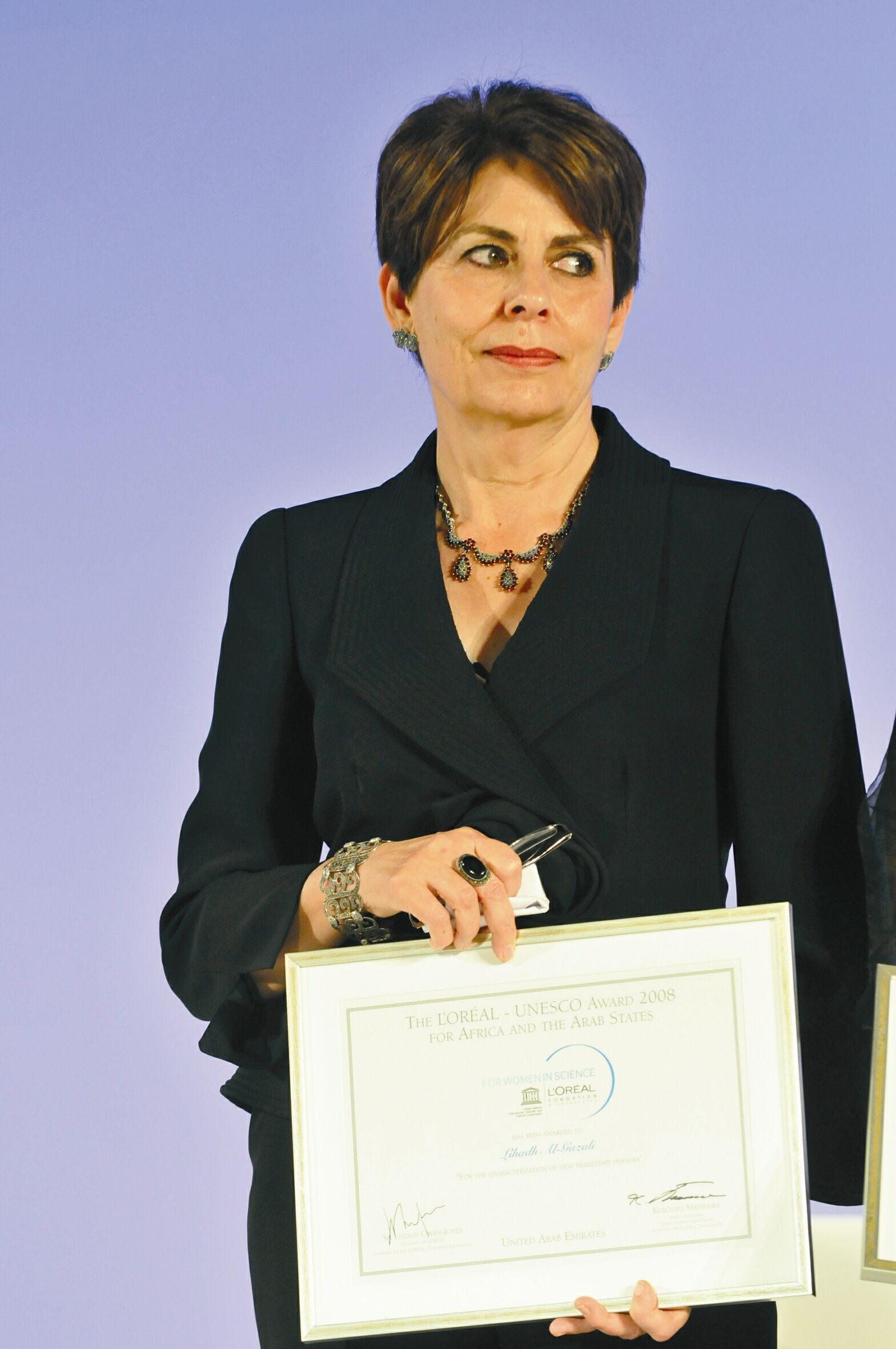
- Receiving the 2008 L'Oréal-UNESCO award
- Born: Baghdad, Iraq
- Citizenship: British
- Education: University of Baghdad (MBChB, 1973); University of Edinburgh (MSc)
- Known for: Al-Gazali syndrome; inherited disorders in Arab populations
- Awards: Hamdan Award for Honouring Individuals Working in the Field of Medicine and Health (2007–2008); L'Oréal-UNESCO Award for Women in Science (2008); Takreem (2014); Abu Dhabi Award; Mohammed Bin Rashid Medal for Scientific Distinguishment (2019)
- Scientific career
- Fields: Clinical genetics
- Workplaces: University of Leeds (1986–1990); United Arab Emirates University (from 1990)

Lihadh Al-Gazali (Arabic: لحاظ الغزالي) is a British Iraqi geneticist and paediatrician. Her main area of interest is identifying new inherited disorders in Arab populations clinically and at the molecular level. Al-Gazali was born and raised in Baghdad. Her mother was an educationalist and her father a judge in the Iraqi armed forces.

== Biography ==
Lihadh Al-Gazali is a professor of clinical genetics and paediatrics, with her work published in over 200 papers in international journals. Having been profiled in The Lancet in March 2006 for her contribution to clinical genetics and research in the Middle East, she was also the 2008 L'Oréal-UNESCO award laureate for Africa and Arab States for the identification of new inherited diseases. In addition, she was the 2014 Laureate for Takreem Awards in the Scientific and Technological Achievement category. In 2008 she was made an honorary member of Alpha Omega Alpha.

Having obtained her medical degree (MBChB) from University of Baghdad in 1973 and initially training in paediatrics, she then moved to the UK, obtained an MSc in genetics at University of Edinburgh and joined University of Leeds in 1986 to further specialise in the field of genetics. Al-Gazali is a Fellow of the Royal College of Physicians and the Royal College of Paediatrics and Child Health in the UK. She joined UAE University in Al Ain in 1990. There she set up a clinical genetics service supported by cytogenetic and DNA laboratories, and helped establish the first gene registry in the UAE.

Her primary research focus was on the delineation of the clinical and molecular basis of autosomal recessive disorders, particularly those found in Arab populations. Al-Gazali syndrome, described in 1994, is named after her. In addition to the global awards mentioned above, she was also the recipient of the Abu Dhabi Award for her contribution to genetic service and research in the UAE. In addition, she received the Mohammed Bin Rashid Medal for scientific distinction in 2019 and is the recipient of several other awards including the Hamdan Award for Honouring Individuals Working in the Field of Medicine & Health.

In 2013, she was one of the scientists invited by Nature to comment on equality for women in science. She was featured in Ingenium's Women in STEM poster series.

Al-Gazali is a founding member and past executive committee member of the Centre for Arab Genomic Studies. She served on numerous international committees, such as the EU-GCC STI Program for Cooperation in Science, Technology and Innovation, the Scientific Board of the International Basic Sciences Program of UNESCO, and several editorial boards of international scientific journals. She has served on the L'Oréal-UNESCO Award jury since 2011.

== Personal life ==
Al-Gazali is married to Wessam Shather and has two daughters and a son.

== Selected publications ==
- Baasanjav, Sevjidmaa; Al-Gazali, Lihadh; et al. (July 2011). "Faulty Initiation of Proteoglycan Synthesis Causes Cardiac and Joint Defects". The American Journal of Human Genetics. 89 (1): 15–27. doi:10.1016/j.ajhg.2011.05.021. PMC 3135799. PMID 21763480.
- Akawi, NA; Al-Gazali, L; Ali, BR (August 2012). "Clinical and molecular analysis of UAE fibrochondrogenesis patients expands the phenotype and reveals two COL11A1 homozygous null mutations". Clinical Genetics. 82 (2): 147–156. doi:10.1111/j.1399-0004.2011.01734.x. PMID 21668896. S2CID 23839531.
- Al-Gazali, Lihadh; Walsh, Christopher A.; et al. (December 2010). "A Homozygous Mutation in the Tight-Junction Protein JAM3 Causes Hemorrhagic Destruction of the Brain, Subependymal Calcification, and Congenital Cataracts". The American Journal of Human Genetics. 87 (6): 882–889. doi:10.1016/j.ajhg.2010.10.026. PMC 2997371. PMID 21109224.
- Al-Gazali, L.; Woods, C. G. (26 October 2010). "A novel NGF mutation clarifies the molecular mechanism and extends the phenotypic spectrum of the HSAN5 neuropathy". Journal of Medical Genetics. 48 (2): 131–135. doi:10.1136/jmg.2010.081455. PMC 3030776. PMID 20978020.
