= Variome =

Set of genetic variations in populations

The variome is the whole set of genetic variations found in populations of species that have gone through a relatively short evolution change. For example, among humans, about 1 in every 1,200 nucleotide bases differ. The size of human variome in terms of effective population size is claimed to be about 10,000 individuals. This variation rate is comparatively small compared to other species. For example, the effective population size of tigers which perhaps has the whole population size less than 10,000 in the wild is not much smaller than the human species indicating a much higher level of genetic diversity although they are close to extinction in the wild. In practice, the variome can be the sum of the single nucleotide polymorphisms (SNPs), indels, and structural variation (SV) of a population or species. The Human Variome Project seeks to compile this genetic variation data worldwide. Variomics is the study of variome and a branch of bioinformatics.

== Ethnic variomes ==
The human variome can be subdivided into smaller ethnicity specific variomes. Each variome can have a utility in terms of filtering out common ethnic specific variants in the analyses of cancer normal variants filtering for more efficient detection of somatic mutations that can be relevant to certain anti-cancer drugs. KoVariome is one such ethnic specific variome where the project uses the term variome to denote their identity and connection to the concept of the broader human variome. KoVariome founders have been affiliated with HVP since early days of HVP where Prof. Richard Cotton initiated various efforts to compile the human variome resources.

Many curated databases has been established to document the impact of clinically significant sequence variations, such as dbSNP or ClinVar. Similarly, many services have been developed by the bioinformatics community to search the literature for variants. ‌

== Etymology ==
The blend word 'variome' is from genetic variant ("a version of a gene that differs from other versions of the same gene which may or may not have an effect on human health") and the suffix –ome ("the complete whole of a class of substances for a species or an individual"). 'Variomics' (which appeared in the literature before 'variome') was first coined by Professor Richard 'Dick' Cotton in 2002 to describe ("The systematic study of the effect of genetic variation on human health"). 'Variome' has since been most commonly used in reference to the 'Human Variome Project' founded four years in 2006 after 'variomics' was first coined.

== Projects ==
There are a number of international project studying the human variome, including the International HapMap Project and the Human Variome Project (HVP). The HapMap Project aims to identify and catalog genetic similarities and differences among humans. The HVP aims to collect data on all human genetic variation. The Korean Genome Project, which aims to collect all the East Asian ethnic Korean genetic variations has produced KoVariome that contains currently over 1,000 Korean whole genome variation information. Turkish Genome Project has plans to analyze genomes of 100,000 people in Turkey.

== See also ==
- Human Variome Project
- Single nucleotide polymorphism
- DNA sequence
- International HapMap Project
- OMIM
- Omics
- DbSNP
- ClinVar
