= Rafaela (disambiguation) =

Rafaela is a city in the province of Santa Fe, Argentina.

Rafaela may also refer to:

== Argentine entities ==
- Atlético de Rafaela, a sports club based in the city of Rafaela
- Autódromo Ciudad de Rafaela, a motor racing circuit in the city of Rafaela
- Rafaela Aerodrome, an airport serving the city of Rafaela
- Roman Catholic Diocese of Rafaela, a diocese in the city of Rafaela

== People ==
=== Mononym ===
- Rafaela (footballer) (Rafaela Andrade de Moraes; born 1981), Brazilian women's international footballer
- María Teresa Rafaela of Spain (1726–1746), daughter of King Philip V of Spain

=== Given name ===
- Rafaela Alburquerque (born 1947), Dominican lawyer and diplomat
- Rafaela Aparicio (1906–1996), Spanish film and theatre actress
- Rafaela Azevedo (born 2002), Portuguese swimmer
- Rafaela Baroni (1935–2021), Venezuelan sculptor and poet
- Rafaela Bezanilla (1797–1855), First Lady of Chile
- Rafaela Chacón Nardi (1926–2001), Cuban poet and educator
- Rafaela Crespín Rubio (born 1976), Spanish politician
- Rafaela Gómez (born 1997), Ecuadorian tennis player
- Rafaela Guedes (born 1992), Brazilian martial artist
- Rafaela Herrera (1742–1805), Spanish criolla
- Rafaela López Aguado de Rayón (1754–1822), Mexican heroine
- Rafaela Ottiano (1888–1942), Italian-American stage and film actress
- Rafaela Pimenta, Brazilian association football agent
- Rafaela Porras Ayllón (1850–1925), Spanish Roman Catholic nun, declared a saint in 1977
- Rafaela Requesens (born 1992), Venezuelan organiser of student protests and democracy activist
- Rafaela Silva (born 1992), Brazilian judoka
- Rafaéla Spanoudaki-Hatziriga (born 1994), Greek sprinter
- Rafaela Ybarra de Vilallonga (1843–1900), Spanish Roman Catholic religious figure
- Rafaela Zanella (born 1986), Brazilian model and beauty pageant titleholder
- Rafaela Zanellato (born 1999), Brazilian rugby sevens player

=== Surname ===
- Ceddanne Rafaela (born 2000), Curaçaoan baseball player
- Charlton Rafaela (born 1977), Antillean sprinter
- Samira Rafaela (born 1989), Dutch politician

== Other uses ==
- Cara Rafaela (1993–2016), a Kentucky thoroughbred mare
- Rafaela, a fictional character in the Claymore manga series
- Rafaela (TV series), a Spanish-language Mexican telenovela that aired in 2011
