= Lamiplast =

Spanish home improvement retailer

- Industry: Retail
- Genre: wood
- Founded: 1962
- Headquarters: Valencia, Spain
- Products: Bathroom tiling and accessories kitchen cabinets parquet floors melamine and postforming boards
- Net income: ▲30 million (2008)
- Number of employees: 160
- Website: www.lamiplast.com

Lamiplast is a Spanish home-improvement retailer . Founded in 1962, the company is based in Valencia, Spain. The company owns and operates six stores and one warehouse and distribution center in Valencian Community and Madrid. The company operates its stores under the commercial brands Lamiplast (Entre Profesionales) and Diseño y Colección Lamiplast. In 2006, the company became one of the official sponsors of the Valencia CF Spanish football team.
