= KoVariome =

Variome of Korean ethnic groups

KoVariome is the variome of Korean ethnic groups. It was initiated in 2010 when the Genome Research Foundation in Korea was established. KoVariome produced around 100 Korean genome diversity data points on 4 April 2018 in Scientific Reports and 1,094 Korean genome variation records on 27 May 2020.
