= Raffa (surname) =

Raffa is a surname with various origins. Notable people with the surname include:

- Al-Sarī al-Raffāʾ (died 973), Iraqi poet in the court of emir Sayf al-Dawla
- Angela Raffa (born 1993), Italian politician
- Charles Raffa (1904–1988), Italian-American businessman, father of Matilda Cuomo
- György Raffa (born 1938), Hungarian ice hockey player
- Jessica Raffa (born c. 1984), Australian ballroom dancer
- Kenneth Raffa (born 1950), American entomologist
- Matilda Cuomo (née Raffa; born 1931), American advocate for women and children, former First Lady of New York
- Nancy Raffa (born c. 1964), American ballet mistress

== See also ==
- Raffa (disambiguation)
- Raffaella
- Raffaelli
