= Negreira case =

Spanish football scandal

The Negreira case is a sports corruption investigation involving Spanish football club Barcelona and José María Enríquez Negreira, a former vice president of the Technical Committee of Referees (CTA) of the Royal Spanish Football Federation (RFEF). The case centers on payments totaling €7.4 million, made by Barcelona to companies linked to Negreira between 2001 and 2018, during his time as the Vice President of the CTA. Barcelona claim they hired Negreira as an external consultant to provide technical reports on refereeing. Negreira has denied being bribed to influence refereeing decisions, though he has said that Barcelona paid him to ensure they had neutrality in the arbitrages.

In May 2024, a Spanish court dismissed the "official's bribery" charges, ruling that Negreira was not considered a public official under Spanish law. However, the investigation continued under the charge of sports corruption. In late August 2024, prosecutors also accused Negreira's associate, Ana Paula Rufas, of money laundering, following the discovery of €3 million transferred to accounts in her name between 1992 and 2023. Public reaction to the case has been divided, with some arguing paying the vice president of Referees Committee (CTA) should have been considered a crime in itself, while Barcelona lawyers argue that since there is no proof of any money being transferred to the actual field referee for any matches, they cannot be found guilty of corruption nor bribery.

== Background ==
Negreira, born in Barcelona in September 1945, is a former football referee who made his debut in 1979–80 La Liga season. In 1994, he became vice-president of the Technical Committee of Referees (CTA) of the Royal Spanish Football Federation (RFEF) until 2018. The payments involved in the alleged scandal were made during the 2000 to 2019 period.

== Accusations and investigation ==
On 15 February 2023, reports surfaced on Spanish radio station Cadena SER that Barcelona had allegedly made payments to a company belonging to Negreira in a potential bribery scandal. Two days later, new information surfaced that showed a letter dated 5 February 2019, in which Negreira threatened to expose Barcelona's irregular activities in retaliation for the club finishing the contract with Negreira's firm, following a series of cost reductions.

In March 2023, Barcelona, former Barcelona presidents Sandro Rosell and Josep Maria Bartomeu, José María Enríquez Negreira, and his son Javier Enríquez Romero, were indicted for "corruption", "breach of trust", and "false business records", opening an investigation into the case. In September 2023, a further charge of "bribery" was attributed to all those investigated. On 18 October 2023, Barcelona president Joan Laporta was also indicted on charges of "bribery, sports corruption, unfair administration, and forgery". On 24 May 2024, the Barcelona Audience Court rejected the hypothesis of the alleged crime of bribery.

In September 2024, Judge Aguirre extended the investigation’s ‘instruction phase,’ which involves collecting evidence, by another six months. Barcelona’s annual financial report, shared with club members earlier this month, stated that no evidence of corruption within a sporting context had been found so far. The report also noted that it was still too early to determine the potential financial or sporting consequences. For the investigation to progress, prosecutors need solid proof that a crime occurred—specifically that Barcelona’s payments to Negreira were intended to manipulate sporting outcomes or that such manipulation actually happened. As of September 2024, no strong case appears to have been established. Sources familiar with the investigation, who spoke on the condition of anonymity, indicated that given the number of charges and witnesses involved, it could take several years to reach a final conclusion.

== Reactions ==
=== Barcelona ===
On 15 February 2023, Barcelona issued a club statement in response to information broadcast on Cadena SER on the same day, clarifying the accusations made against the club. Regarding the payments, Barcelona claimed that the club had "hired the services of an external consultant [Negreira] that supplied the club's technical secretaries with reports in video format of youth players from other clubs in Spain", and that in addition to these reports, "the relationship with that supplier extended to technical reports related to professional refereeing in order to complement the information requested by the first and second team coaching staff". However, Barcelona denied any wrongdoing, with president Joan Laporta that "Barcelona has never bought referees".

=== Mundo Deportivo ===
The "100 matches of the 'Negreira era'" is a journalistic investigation published by the Spanish sports newspaper Mundo Deportivo in late December 2025. According to Mundo Deportivo, the series was published as a response to the allegations surrounding the Negreira case and argues that Barcelona did not receive favorable refereeing treatment during the period of payments to José María Enríquez Negreira (2001–2018). Report: 100 Matches of the Negreira Era "100 partidos de la 'era Negreira' con errores contra el Barça y a favor del Madrid" is a multi-part series authored by journalists Sergi Solé and Xavier Muñoz. The report catalogs specific refereeing incidents where Barcelona was allegedly harmed or Real Madrid was allegedly benefited during the 17-year period under investigation by Spanish authorities.

==== Chronological chapters ====
The report is divided into three distinct eras to match the phases of the judicial investigation:

- Chapter 1 (2001–2006): Covers the presidencies of Joan Gaspart and Joan Laporta (first term). Key incidents include the 2001 "Rivaldo Goal" at the Bernabéu, which was disallowed for a non-existent offside in the 92nd minute, and various disallowed goals by Luis Enrique and Patrick Kluivert.
- Chapter 2 (2007–2012): Focuses on the "Pep Guardiola Era." It highlights the 2006–07 League title loss, citing unpunished handballs by Ruud van Nistelrooy and unawarded penalties for Ronaldinho. It also details "phantom penalties" awarded to Real Madrid and unpunished red-card offenses by Sergio Ramos and Pepe.
- Chapter 3 (2013–2018): Covers the Luis Enrique and Ernesto Valverde eras. Notable entries include the 2014 title-deciding goal by Lionel Messi against Atlético Madrid (wrongly ruled offside) and the 2017 "ghost goal" against Real Betis, where the ball crossed the line by over half a meter but was not counted.

==== Arguments and objectives ====
The primary thesis of the series is "Desmontando el Negreirato" (Dismantling the Negreirato). The authors argue a lack of sporting benefit, as the presence of high-profile errors that directly cost Barcelona league titles (such as 2007 and 2014) contradicts the theory of "purchased neutrality" or favouritism.

==== Comparative balance ====
The report claims that Real Madrid received a significantly higher "net benefit" from refereeing errors during the same period. The data in the report has been referenced by club officials, including President Joan Laporta, to argue that the payments to Negreira—which the club maintains were for technical scouting reports—did not influence on-field results. The report utilises video review of La Liga and Copa del Rey broadcasts from 2001 to 2018. The Mundo Deportivo Digital articles were published between December 22 and December 27, 2025.

- Cap. 1 (2001–06): Published 27 December 2025.
- Cap. 2 (2007–12): Published 27 December 2025.
- Cap. 3 (2013–18): Published 27 December 2025.

The report cites subsequent public apologies or admissions of error by referees such as Mateu Lahoz and Daudén Ibáñez regarding specific matches listed.

=== Miguel Galán ===
Miguel Galán, president of CENAFE (National Center for Training Football Coaches) and a well-known legal litigator in Spanish football (often nicknamed "El Querellator"), has become a central figure in the Negreira Case as of 2025–2026. Galán has been prominent in maintaining that the facts of the case do not demonstrate an intent to influence referees or results, but has disapproved of the payments on ethical and institutional grounds.

==== Galán's official position ====
According to reporting from Confilegal and Diario AS, Galán’s stance is built on a strictly legalist interpretation of the Spanish Penal Code.

==== "Negreira hoax" monograph ====
In December 2025, Galán published a legal monograph titled "El bulo Negreira desde el derecho penal" (The Negreira Hoax from Criminal Law). He argues that the crime of sports corruption requires an "animus alterandi" (intent to alter a result) and a "matching benefit." Galán asserts that there are no emails, witnesses, or financial trails proving that money reached any active referee to influence a game. Galán famously argued that if Barcelona paid to "ensure neutrality", they were paying for something that is already a referee's duty. While ethically questionable, he argues this does not constitute a crime of corruption under Article 286 bis of the Penal Code.

==== Legal actions against Javier Tebas ====
Galán has used the Negreira investigation to launch a major legal offensive against La Liga President Javier Tebas. In August 2025, Galán filed a 50-page dossier with the Higher Sports Council (CSD) accusing Tebas of revealing confidential financial data about Barcelona (specifically regarding VIP box sales and the Nico Williams transfer saga). As of November 2025, the Administrative Sports Court (TAD) opened a disciplinary file against Tebas following Galán's complaint, which could lead to Tebas's disqualification or removal from office.

==== Role as popular prosecution ====
Despite defending Barcelona against corruption charges, Galán joined the case as a popular prosecutor through his Association for Transparency and Democracy in Sport in September 2025. He has officially asked the judge to call former RFEF President Ángel María Villar and former referee Mateu Lahoz to testify. In October 2025, Real Madrid filed a legal objection to Galán’s participation, claiming his public defense of Barcelona would "distort the cause" and that he was acting as a "hidden defense" rather than a prosecutor .

=== Pep Guardiola ===
Pep Guardiola has been one of the most vocal defenders of Barcelona's integrity during the "Negreira Case" investigation. His defense is built on the argument that the team's historic success was a result of sporting superiority, not outside influence. The most famous quote from his defense—"It was a scandal how well we played"—was delivered during a press conference in October 2023 shortly after Joan Laporta was formally added to the list of investigated persons.

==== Guardiola's defense ====
===== "On-field superiority" argument =====
Guardiola's primary defense is that his team (2008–2012) was so dominant that suggesting they needed help from referees is illogical. He said, "You didn’t see how good this team was, it was a scandal how well we played. We won because we were far better than our rivals. And when they were not, they did not win, they lose." Guardiola was responding to questions about whether his 14 titles at Barcelona were "tainted" by the payments to the former Vice President of the Technical Committee of Referees (CTA).

==== Defense of Joan Laporta ====
Guardiola has specifically defended the innocence of the club's current president, who was also president during his first two seasons. He said, "Barça is innocent, Laporta is innocent, until the opposite is proven. I am pretty sure that when Barcelona won, it was because they were better than the opponents."

==== Personal testimony on refereeing ====
Guardiola maintains that in his four years as head coach, he never saw or heard of any corrupt practices. He said, "I didn't see Barcelona really, really, really, really pay a referee to take a benefit. I didn't see that, I didn't read it. That's why I want to wait before I have an opinion."

=== Other La Liga clubs ===
On 21 February 2023, a collection of a La Liga clubs issued a joint statement reacting to the investigation into Barcelona, expressing their "deep concern" over the information published. The clubs issuing the statement were Atlético Madrid, Levante, Tenerife, Sevilla, Real Betis, Real Sociedad, Cádiz, Getafe, Villarreal, Alavés, Eibar, Las Palmas, Lugo, and Huesca. Barcelona's rival Real Madrid later issued a statement expressing "deep concern about the seriousness of the events".

On 29 September 2023, ahead of a league match between Barcelona and Sevilla, Sevilla issued a statement rejecting the "behaviour of Barcelona during the period" for which the club was being investigated. Sevilla directors refused a pre-match meal with Barcelona directors and refused to sit in the directors' box at the Estadi Olímpic Lluís Companys. Barcelona reacted by issuing a club statement rejecting Sevilla's actions, characterizing them as an "unjustified attack" and an "unacceptable offense".

=== UEFA ===
On 23 March 2023, UEFA announced that it had launched an investigation into the payments by Barcelona to Negreira. On 3 April 2023, UEFA president Aleksander Čeferin described the Negreira case as "one of the most serious" he's ever seen.

In October 2025, Joan Laporta announced that Barcelona would rejoin the European Football Clubs (EFC) (formerly the ECA), marking the club's withdrawal from the European Super League. The decision was announced during the EFC General Assembly in Rome, where Nasser Al-Khelaïfi (EFC and PSG President) and Aleksander Čeferin (UEFA President) welcomed Laporta. Al-Khelaïfi emphasized unity, stating: "Joan is a long-time friend... sometimes friends can disagree, but in the end, they find a solution. We're all happy that he's back in our family." Laporta described the decision as a step toward the "pacification of European football" and said it resulted in an agreement with UEFA that included plans to stage a La Liga match in Miami.

This reconciliation left Florentino Pérez and Real Madrid completely isolated as the sole remaining backers of the Super League (A22) project. Pérez criticized Barcelona's withdrawal from the project and described it as a betrayal. During the Real Madrid General Assembly in November 2025, Pérez retaliated by using the Negreira Case as a political weapon to attack Barcelona's integrity. He stated: "It’s NOT normal for Barcelona to pay the vice-president of the referees more than €8m over 17 years... it coincides, coincidentally, with Barcelona's best sporting period." Pérez vowed to pursue the case to the fullest extent, ending the years-long institutional alliance between the two clubs. Laporta rejected Pérez's accusations, describing them as a smokescreen for the failure of the Super League project. During a Christmas address at the Palau Blaugrana, Laporta accused Madrid of having an "acute case of 'Barcelonitis'" and criticized their official TV channel for "vomiting lies and constantly poisoning public opinion." He maintained that the Negreira allegations were being "stretched like chewing gum" by Madrid to distract from their own isolation. By early 2026, disputes between Barcelona and Real Madrid increasingly focused on legal and institutional issues related to the Super League and the Negreira investigation.

In February 2026, Florentino Pérez and Real Madrid officially abandoned the European Super League project. After being the last remaining founding member of the breakaway league, Pérez reached a "peace deal" with UEFA and the European Football Clubs (EFC) group to end the nearly five-year dispute. Also in February 2026, La Liga President Javier Tebas has stated it is "clear" that Barcelona did not pay referees to influence matches in the Negreira case, contradicting narratives that the club purchased "arbitrary decisions". While acknowledging payments to former referee vice-president José María Enríquez Negreira were "unacceptable from a sporting perspective," Tebas clarified there is no evidence of direct bribery.

== See also ==
- Calciopoli
