= Human Variome Project =

Global initiative to collect human genetic variation

The Human Variome Project

The Human Variome Project (HVP) is the global initiative to collect and curate all human genetic variation affecting human health. Its mission is to improve health outcomes by facilitating the unification of data on human genetic variation and its impact on human health.

== Inception ==
The HVP concept was conceived by Richard Cotton, a leader in the field of human genetic variation. His group, the Genomic Disorders Research Centre, based at the University of Melbourne and St. Vincent's Hospital, has established a consortium that covers genomic variation and its health implications in a comprehensive form. This consortium has encouraged the creation and supported many of the 571 gene specific variation databases currently available on the internet. However, these databases are of varying completeness and individualistic, so the Human Variome Project was born to establish a central project to encourage the collection and sourcing of this data, verifying it and ultimately using it for improved health outcomes.

Geneticists, diagnosticians, researchers and bioinformatics scientists came together in June 2006 at the Human Variome Project Meeting, organized by Cotton’s team, and agreed to take on the task of organising data collection and unifying the systems of data access and storage. This initiative builds on substantial pilot work and achievements of the Human Genome Variation Society. The authority of those initiating this project is evidenced by the fact that major international bodies were present. These included WHO, OECD, European Commission, UNESCO, March of Dimes (US), Centers for Disease Control and Prevention (US), Google, representatives of two dozen international genetics bodies, numerous genetics journals, 20 countries and Australian State and Federal Governments.

This major international project, a natural partner to the Human Genome Project, will require substantial funding to get it to a sustainable position. A five-year secure budget period of approximately US$12m per year has been proposed to initiate the project. This will enable the project to be organized and find operational funds for the tasks of system development, informatics, database curation and clinical access as well as collection systems that are open and accessible to all.

The Human Variome Project seeks to provide open access to the full realm of genetic variation for the benefit of everyone.

The Centre for Arab Genomic Studies (CAGS) has initiated efforts to proceed with the Arab Human Variome Project under the Human Variome Project. CAGS was one of the participants of the HVP meeting in Melbourne. Since then, several meetings have been held between officials of HVP and CAGS members to discuss the nature of work involved.

== See also ==
- Variome
- Human Genome Project
- Human genetic variation
- Population groups in biomedicine
