= Jaume Ortí =

Spanish businessman

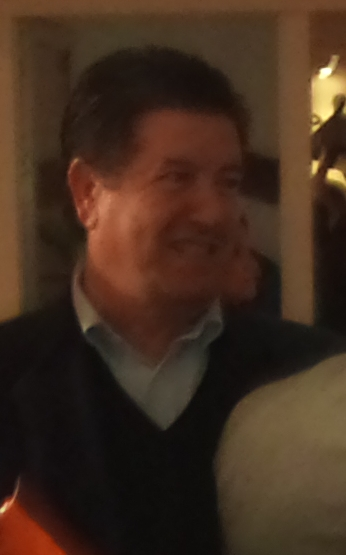
Jaume Ortí.

Jaume Ortí Ruiz (24 January 1947 – 24 November 2017) was a Spanish businessman who was the president of the football club Valencia CF from 2001 to 2004. His time as president, which mostly overlapped with Rafael Benítez's spell as manager, resulted in more trophies than any other president of the club: La Liga titles in 2002 and 2004, the UEFA Cup in 2004 and the UEFA Super Cup in 2004.

== Biography ==
=== Early life and career ===
Born in Aldaia, Ortí and his father ran a company making aluminium shutters. The company grew to 300 employees before the Spanish financial crisis. Ortí said that the redundancies that the company made were damaging to the local community, as in some cases several generations of the same family were out of work.

=== President of Valencia CF ===
Ortí joined the board at Valencia CF under the presidency of Francisco Roig and was about to succeed him in December 1997 when Pedro Cortés became president instead. Ortí was vice-president as the team ended a trophy drought with the Copa del Rey in 1999. Two successive UEFA Champions League final defeats and the losses of manager Héctor Cúper and midfielder Gaizka Mendieta led to Cortés's resignation, with Ortí succeeding him on 12 June 2001. Ortí held 176 out of 190,000 shares in the club.

Under Ortí's presidency and the management of Rafael Benítez, Valencia had their most successful spell, winning two La Liga titles, one UEFA Cup and the UEFA Super Cup. A supporter of the club, he had travelled to Sarrià Stadium in Barcelona when Valencia won the league title in 1971, and brandished a large palmetto fan to celebrate that triumph. He took the exact same fan to celebrate their league title at La Rosaleda Stadium in Málaga in 2002 and again in Seville in 2004, as well as wearing an orange wig. In August 2003, at the start of a season in which Valencia won the league, Ortí was booed by fans who considered that the club had not strengthened after a disappointing previous campaign, nor taken up substantial offers to sell stars David Albelda and Roberto Ayala.

Ortí popularised the nickname Galácticos for the Real Madrid team with whom he competed for titles. At the start of the 21st century, Real Madrid invested heavily in foreign stars such as Luís Figo, Zinedine Zidane, Ronaldo and David Beckham.

Ortí encouraged Juan Bautista Soler to invest in the club in order to minimise Roig's power. On 5 October 2004, Soler, as majority shareholder, ousted Ortí from the presidency. Ortí received the news during a UEFA Champions League match away to SV Werder Bremen.

=== Later life and death ===
Ortí had four children, of which two were from his first wife and the other two from his second. He said that during his presidency, one of his sons went by his mother's surname at university, and his daughter did not want to walk down the street with him.

In December 2009, Ortí and his predecessor as president, Pedro Cortés, were hired as football commentators for Radiotelevisió Valenciana.

Ortí died on 24 November 2017 from lung cancer, aged 70. Valencia forward Rodrigo paid homage by celebrating a goal by wearing an orange wig, as Ortí was noted to wear.
