= Al Rifa =

Al Rifa الرفاعة
- Community
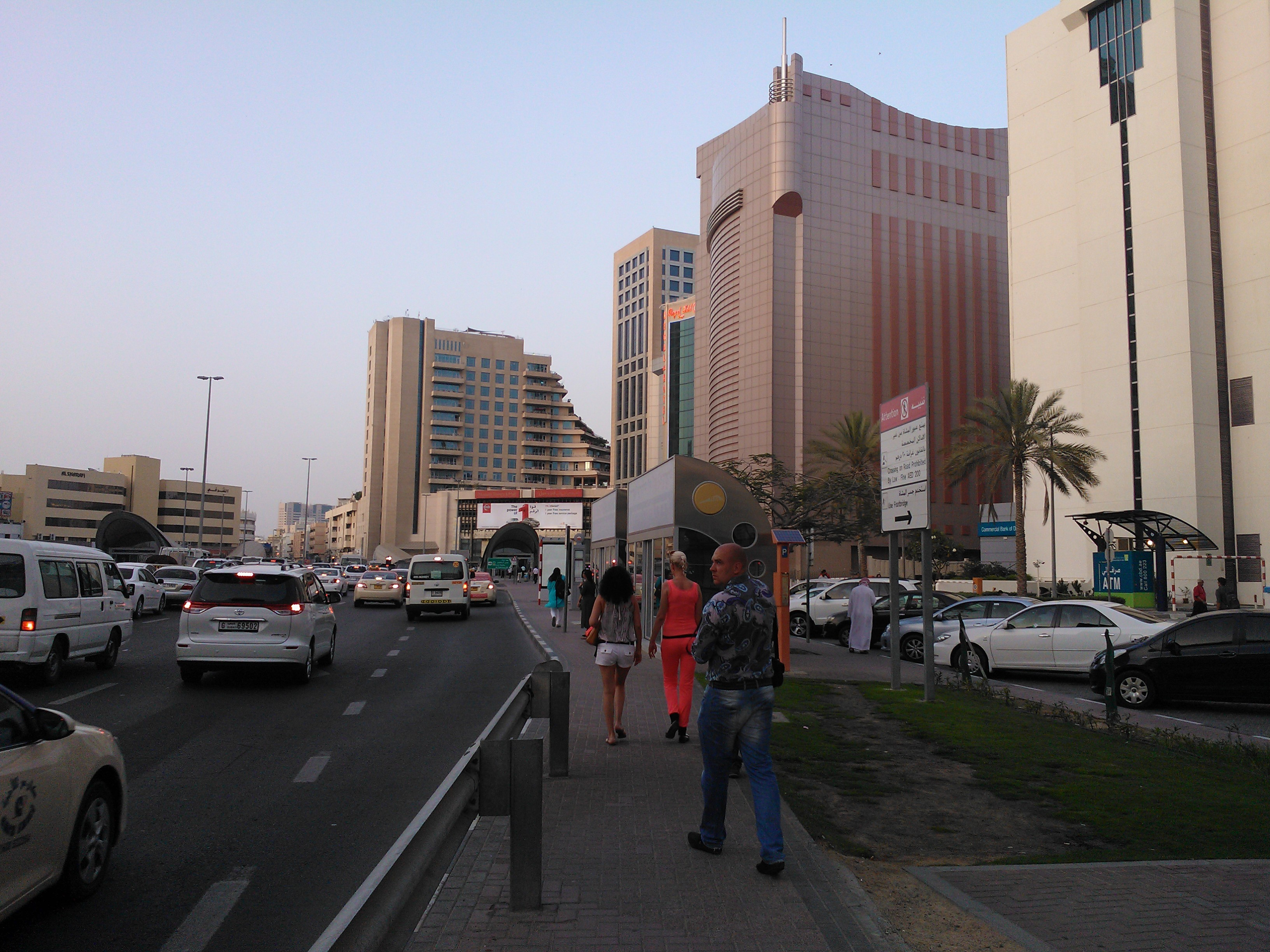
- Al Rifa community map
- Interactive map of Al Rifa
- Coordinates: 25.25688°N 55.28904°E
- Country: United Arab Emirates
- Emirate: Dubai
- City: Dubai

Area
  - Total: 1.24 km^{2} (0.48 sq mi)

Population (2000)
  - Total: 15,344
  - Density: 12,400/km^{2} (32,000/sq mi)
- Community number: 316

Al Rifa (Arabic: الرفاعة), also spelled Al Raffa, is a locality in Dubai, United Arab Emirates (UAE). Located in western Dubai, in Bur Dubai, Al Rifa borders Al Souk Al Kabir to the north, Al Hudaiba to the south, Port Rashid to the west and Al Mankhool to the east.

Al Rifa is largely a residential community; however several banks, restaurants and shopping centres (such as Al Khaleej Centre) are located in Al Rifa.

The Falcon roundabout was located here. Built it the early 1970s it was demolished later.
