= Al Souk Al Kabir =

Al Souk Al Kabir السوق الكبير
- Community
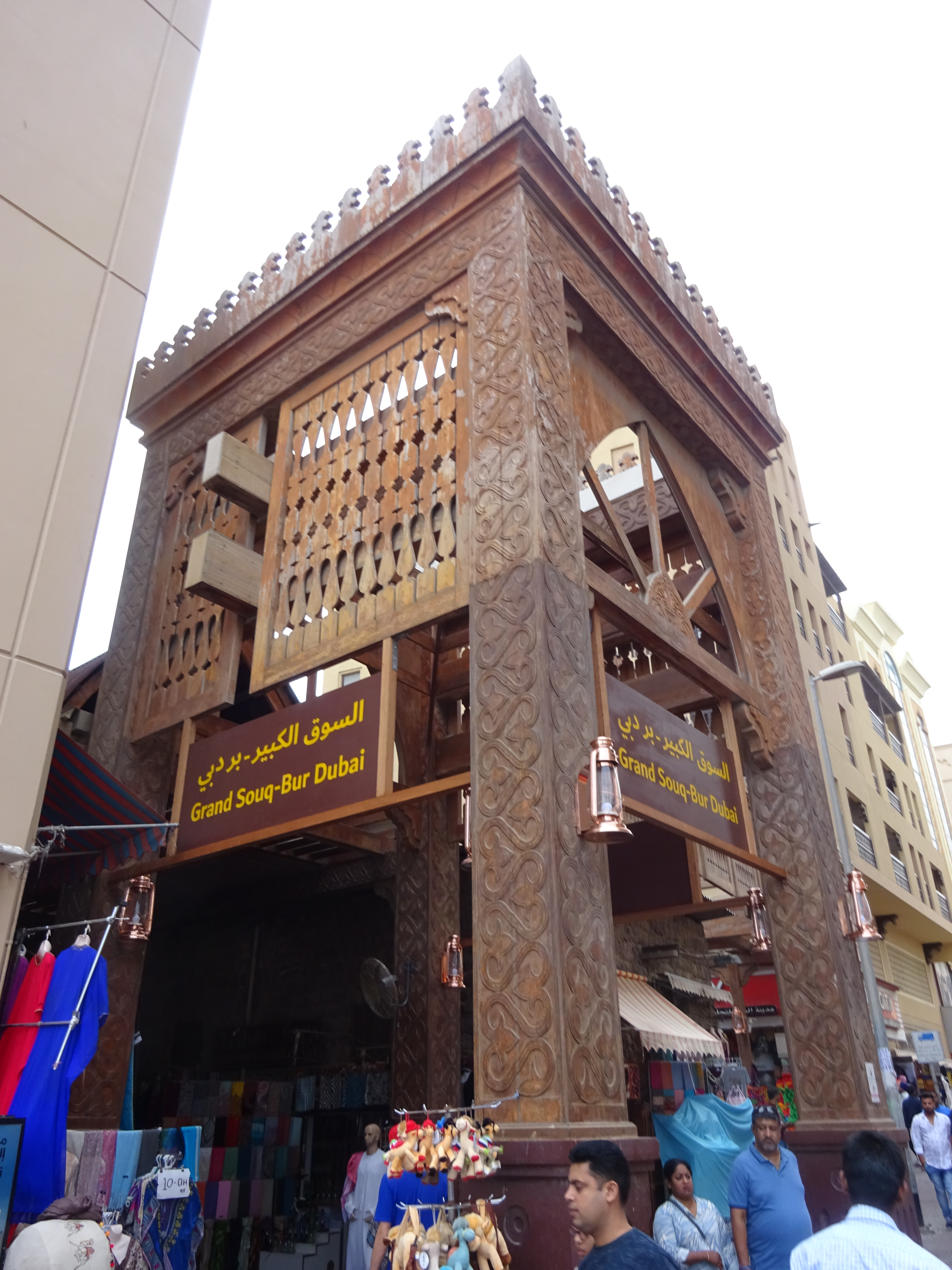
- Entrance to the souq
- Interactive map of Al Souk Al Kabir
- Coordinates: 25.26216°N 55.29436°E
- Country: United Arab Emirates
- Emirate: Dubai
- City: Dubai
- Established: 1890s

Area
  - Total: 0.855 km^{2} (0.330 sq mi)

Population (2000)
  - Total: 26,405
  - Density: 30,900/km^{2} (80,000/sq mi)
- Community number: 312

Al Souk Al Kabir (Arabic: السوق الكبير), also referred to as Grand Souq, Bur Dubai, is a locality in Dubai, United Arab Emirates that refers to the Souq in Bur Dubai.

Important landmarks close to the Al Souk Al Kabir include the Al Fahidi Historical Neighborhood and the Al Fahidi Fort.

== History ==
Bur Dubai (in Arabic: بر دبي) translates to 'Mainland Dubai' and is the oldest historical neighborhood of Dubai. Al Souq Al Khabir is located in the north of the area, close to Dubai Creek. The Bani Yas tribe settled here in the 19th century, whom were of Najdi origin. Dubai creek served as a minor port for dhows, a traditional wooden boat, coming from India and East Africa. This area also played an important part in Dubai's pearl and fishing industry.

== Modern times ==
The area is well known for its many textile shops and markets, predominantly selling South Asian fashion and accessories. Amongst the majority of textile shops are tailors, gold shops, electronics and other small businesses. There are also various food outlets, restaurants and cafes.
