= Centre for Arab Genomic Studies =

Coordinates: 25°14′57″N 55°17′13″E

- Abbreviation: CAGS
- Headquarters: Al Rifa, Dubai
- Location: UAE
- Region served: Arab World
- President: Najib Al Khaja
- Director: Mahmoud Taleb Al Ali
- Parent organization: Sheikh Hamdan bin Rashid Al Maktoum Award for Medical Sciences
- Website: www.cags.org.ae

The Centre for Arab Genomic Studies (CAGS) is a not-for-profit study centre aimed at the characterization and prevention of genetic disorders in the Arab World. The Centre is closely associated with the Sheikh Hamdan Award for Medical Sciences. One of the major projects of CAGS is the Catalogue for Transmission Genetics in Arabs (CTGA), an online, freely accessible database of genetic disorders reported from the Arab World. CAGS has been involved in the Human Variome Project as a representative of the Arab region and has been one of the first organizations to take an active lead in working on the project. CAGS organizes the Pan Arab Human Genetics Conference every alternate year, to provide a platform for discussion and education on genetic issues in the region.

== History ==
The Arab World is known for the increased incidence of genetic disorders among the population. A large part of this is attributed to the widespread norm of consanguinity in the region. Other factors include a social trend to have more children until menopause, selective factors favoring inherited disease characters like thalassemia and glucose-6-phosphate dehydrogenase deficiency, and the lack of public awareness towards the early recognition and prevention of inherited disease. CAGS was originally envisaged by Sheikh Hamdan bin Rashid Al Maktoum, Deputy Ruler of Dubai and Minister of Finance and Industry, UAE, to alleviate human suffering from genetic diseases in the Arab World. The Centre was inaugurated on 25 June 2003 by Hamad Abdul Rahman Al Midfaa, the Minister of Health, and Chairman, Board of Trustees of the Sheikh Hamdan Bin Rashid Al Maktoum Award for Medical Sciences, at the Genetic Centre of Al Wasl Hospital. As of 2014 offices of the Centre for Arab Genomic Studies were located within the premises of Hamdan Bin Rashid Al Maktoum Award for Medical Sciences.

Some of the priority objectives of CAGS are to educate the public and professionals on the important impact of genetic diseases in the Arab World and the methods and benefits of early genetic diagnosis. CAGS also plans to provide comprehensive genetic services by translating research achievements into well-integrated patient treatment programs. It also intends to address the ethical, legal, and social issues that may arise with the implementation of such programs. A small number of local scientists from the UAE constitute the Executive Board of CAGS, which helps in taking policy decisions for the Centre.

In late 2005 the Arab Council of CAGS was formed, which comprises leading geneticists from different Arab countries. As of 2014 the Council had representations from Bahrain, Egypt, Jordan, Kuwait, Lebanon, Oman, Qatar, Saudi Arabia, Sudan, and Tunisia. The Council was formed with an aim to facilitate the exchange of information on genetic disorders occurring in Arab countries and to be a medium for multidisciplinary collaborative research aiming at the identification and prevention of genetic disorders in the region.

== Activities and Projects ==
=== CTGA Database ===
The Catalogue for Transmission Genetics in Arabs (CTGA) database is a project which aims to create a comprehensive compendium of information related to the entire range of genetic disorders reported among Arabs. This information is available on the CAGS website. As of now, the database has information on approximately 1160 genetic disorders and related genes reported in Arab subjects. CAGS' strategy with regard to the CTGA database is to cover the spectrum of genetic diseases in each of the Arab countries. As of December 2008, the database has finished its project with respect to the United Arab Emirates, Bahrain, and Oman.

=== Pan Arab Human Genetics Conference ===
The Pan Arab Human Genetics series of Conference is planned to be held every alternate year by the Centre as a means of providing a platform on dialogue and education for geneticists in the region, to share their knowledge and to talk on common issues. The first edition of the conference, held in 2006, was supported by the Human Genome Organization (HUGO), and attracted more than 500 delegates. This conference was preceded by a one-day workshop on "Fundamental Approaches in Molecular Diagnosis of Hemoglobinopathies".

The second Pan Arab Human Genetics Conference, held in November 2007, put more emphasis on the ethics of genetic research. This conference provided a one-day public forum on the Ethical Perspective of Genetic Research; a forum which saw religious leaders as well as genetic researchers discussing this very important issue. The scientific part of the congress lasted two days, and was attended by well over 800 delegates, many of them from outside the Arab region. The conference was supported by the Dubai Health Authority, the Dubai Islamic Affairs and Charitable Activities Department, the Human Variome Project, and HUGO. Other participating organizations included the Division of Ethics of Science and Technology, UNESCO, the National Institute for Child Health and Human Development, NIH, and the journal, Nature Genetics. Like the previous conference, a two-day pre-conference workshop on the Applications of FISH technology in Cytogenetyics was also held as part of the program of the conference.

=== Human Variome Project ===
CAGS was a participant in the preliminary meeting to discuss the conception of the Human Variome Project (HVP), held in Melbourne, Australia, in 2006. Ever since, CAGS has actively worked towards the Arab Human Variome Project (AHVP), in collaboration with its Arab Council members. Several meeting have been held with the members of the Council, as well as the Director of the HVP in order to understand the nature of work involved, and to initiate the project in the region.

=== Human Genome Organization ===
CAGS shares very close ties with the Human Genome Organization (HUGO). HUGO served as a prominent supporter of both concluded editions of the PAHG Conference. In addition, CAGS with the help of the Dubai World Trade Centre and Dubai Convention Bureau, made a successful bid to host the HUGO Annual Human Genome Meet (HGM) 2011 in Dubai.

== Publications ==
The Centre published the first two volumes of its book "Genetic Disorders in the Arab World", which is a consequence of its work on cataloguing the Arab genetic disorders. The first volume of this book gives special emphasis on the data from the United Arab Emirates, whereas the second volume deals especially with the Kingdom of Bahrain. Another book published by CAGS is a User's Guide on the CTGA database. All books are downloadable without charge from the CAGS website (http://cags.org.ae/publications.html)

As part of its campaign to educate the general public about genetic disorders and their consequences, CAGS released a pocket-book collection of bilingual (English and Arabic) pamphlets on six common genetic blood disorders in the region. Each of these leaflets provides a general description of an inherited blood disorder, along with its symptoms and major characteristics, and follows it up with causes and risk factors, diagnosis and management of the disease. Also provided in each leaflet is information on studies undertaken in the Arab world on the disease.

Scientific articles published by the Centre include articles in the Nucleic Acids Research, American Journal of Human Genetics, and American Journal of Medical Genetics.

== See also ==
- Human Genome Organization
- Human Variome Project
- Genetic studies on Arabs
