= Rafah (disambiguation) =

Rafah is a city in the Gaza Strip, Israel.

Rafah may also refer to:

== Places ==
- Rafah Camp, Rafah, Gaza, Palestine; a refugee camp located next to the eponymous city
- Rafah Governorate, Gaza, Palestine; a governorate bordering Egypt whose capital is Rafah
- Rafah Border Crossing, Gaza—Egypt; a border gate between Rafah, Sinai and Rafah, Gaza
- Rafah, North Sinai Governorate, Egypt; a city on the border of Gaza
- Islamic Emirate of Rafah (2009), a short-lived self-declared state in Gaza

== People ==
- Rafah DiCostanzo (born 1962), Canadian politician
- Rafah Nanjeba Torsa (born 1998), Bangladeshi actress

== See also ==
- Battle of Rafah (disambiguation)
- Rafa (disambiguation)
- Raffa (disambiguation)
