= Trigueros del Valle =

Coordinates: 41°50′N 4°39′W

Trigueros del Valle, Spain
- Flag Coat of arms

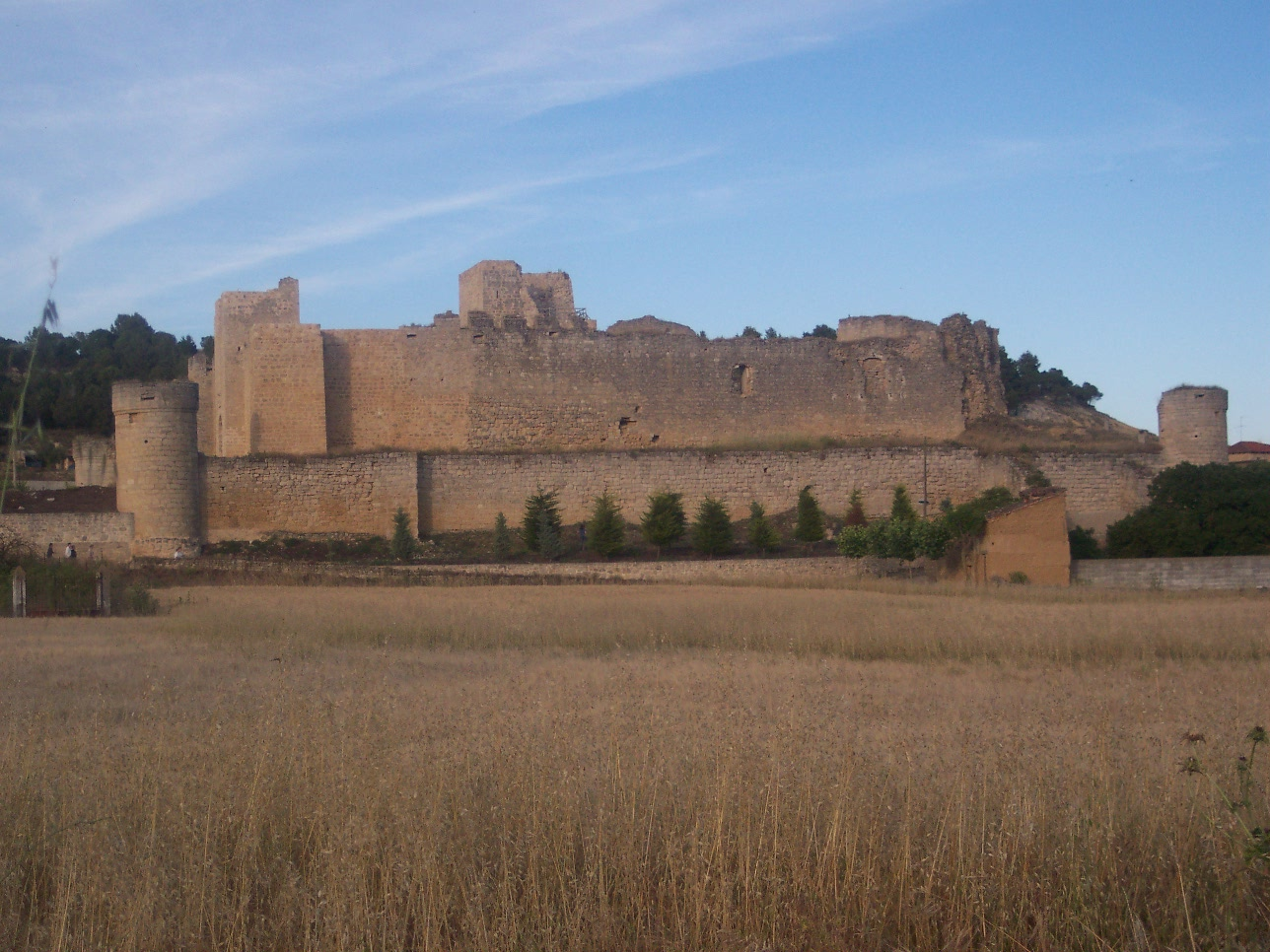
- Castle
- Country: Spain
- Autonomous community: Castile and León
- Province: Valladolid
- Municipality: Trigueros del Valle

Area
  - Total: 37 km^{2} (14 sq mi)

Population (2025-01-01)
  - Total: 320
  - Density: 8.6/km^{2} (22/sq mi)
- Time zone: UTC+1 (CET)
  - Summer (DST): UTC+2 (CEST)

Trigueros del Valle is a municipality located in the province of Valladolid, Castile and León, Spain. According to the 2004 census (INE), the municipality has a population of 320 inhabitants.
