= Rafa (disambiguation) =

Rafa is a masculine given name.

Rafa or RAFA may also refer to:

== Rafa ==
- Rafa, Kuyavian-Pomeranian Voivodeship, a village in Poland
- Battle of Rafa, a First World War victory by the British Empire over the Ottoman Empire
- Rafael (given name), abbreviated as "Rafa"
- Rafaela (given name), abbreviated as "Rafa"; see Rafaela (disambiguation)

== RAFA ==
- Royal Air Forces Association
- Ramanathan Academy of Fine Arts, a division of the University of Jaffna, Sri Lanka

== See also ==
- Rafah (disambiguation)
- Raffa (disambiguation)
