= Florentino Pérez =

Spanish businessman (born 1947)

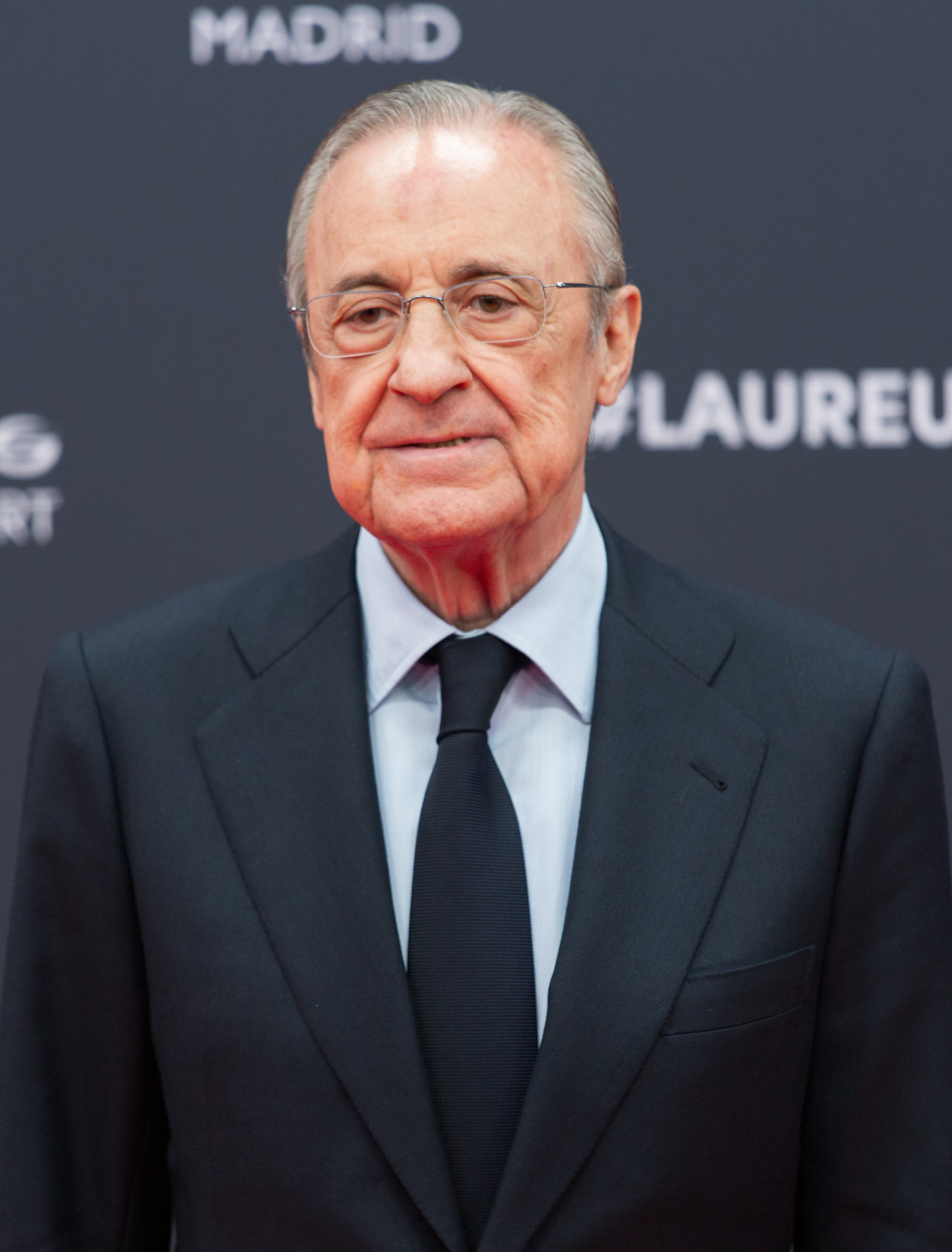
- Pérez in 2024

15th and 18th President of Real Madrid
- Incumbent
- Assumed office 1 June 2009
- Preceded by: Vicente Boluda
- In office 16 July 2000 – 27 February 2006
- Preceded by: Lorenzo Sanz
- Succeeded by: Fernando Martín Álvarez (unofficial); Ramón Calderón
- Born: Florentino Pérez Rodríguez; 8 March 1947 (age 79); Hortaleza, Madrid, Spain
- Education: Technical University of Madrid
- Occupations: Businessman; civil engineer; sports club president
- Known for: President of Real Madrid; Chairman of the European Super League
- Political party: Union of the Democratic Center (1979–1983); Democratic Reformist Party (1983–1986)
- Board member of: Chairman of ACS Group
- Spouse: María Ángeles "Pitina" Sandoval Montero (m. 1970; died 2012)
- Children: 3

Florentino Pérez Rodríguez (Spanish pronunciation: [floɾenˈtino ˈpeɾeθ roˈðɾiɣeθ]; born 8 March 1947) is a Spanish businessman and politician. He is the president of the football club Real Madrid, as well as chairman and CEO of ACS Group, a civil engineering company.

Pérez began his professional career in the private sector in 1971 and was a member of the political parties Union of the Democratic Centre and the secretary-general of the Democratic Reformist Party, from 1979 to 1986. He has been president of Real Madrid from 2000 to 2006 and from 2009 onwards. During his first six years as president, he implemented the Galácticos policy of bringing the world's best players to Real Madrid. In his first four seasons in charge, he bought Luís Figo from arch-rivals Barcelona, Zinedine Zidane for a then-world record transfer fee, Ronaldo, and David Beckham. From the 2003–04 season to the 2005–06 season, the club did not win a trophy, leading Pérez to resign in 2006.

Pérez reassumed office again in 2009 and restarted the Galácticos policy. He brought to the club Kaká, Xabi Alonso, Karim Benzema, and Cristiano Ronaldo, the latter for a then-world record fee, followed by Gareth Bale in 2013. Over the course of eleven seasons from 2013 to 2024, the club won six Champions League titles. Real Madrid has won a record 7 Champions League titles during his presidency. Pérez is the most successful president in the history of Real Madrid, winning 37 titles during his presidency, surpassing Santiago Bernabéu, who won 32.

== Early career ==
Pérez attended the Polytechnic University of Madrid. He joined the Union of the Democratic Centre party in 1979, serving as a member of Madrid's city council. In 1986, Pérez ran as a candidate for the Democratic Reformist Party (Partido Reformista Democrático) and served as its secretary-general.

In 1993, Pérez was named vice chairman of OCP Construcciones. After the merger of OCP with Gines y Navarro into Actividades de Construcción y Servicios, S.A. (ACS) in 1997, he became chairman of the new company. As of 2018, Pérez leads ACS Group, Spain's largest construction company, and has an estimated net worth of US$2.5 billion.

== Real Madrid presidency ==
=== First term ===
In 1995, Pérez ran as a candidate for the presidency of Real Madrid against Ramón Mendoza and Santiago Gómez Pintado. Despite obtaining the highest number of signatures to endorse his candidacy, he came in second place.

In 2000, Pérez again ran as a candidate for presidency of Real Madrid, which he won with more than 55% of the votes, beating the incumbent president at that time, Lorenzo Sanz. Sanz assumed that the recently won UEFA Champions Leagues in 1998 and 2000 would give him enough credit to win the elections, but Pérez's campaign, once again highlighting the financial problems of the club and claims of mismanagement by the previous boards, proved otherwise. Pérez's promise to bring in Luís Figo from arch-rivals Barcelona also played a decisive role in the elections. Pérez was later re-elected in 2004 with 94.2% of the total votes.

Figo also marked the start of Pérez's policy to bring one of the best football players in the world to Real Madrid each season. The strategy was initially known as that of Zidanes y Pavones in which superstars would play alongside the Canteranos, but the players were soon popularly referred to as Galácticos. In 2001, Zinedine Zidane was signed from Juventus for a then-world record transfer fee of €77.5 million. Zidane was followed up by Ronaldo in 2002, David Beckham in 2003, Michael Owen in 2004, and Robinho for a short time in 2005. Initially, Pérez's policy worked to great success, as each new Galáctico had the squad built around them, and the team had a good balance between attack and defence. In his first years in office, Real Madrid won two Spanish championships and its record ninth UEFA Champions League. Pérez claimed success in clearing the club's debt; however, this was contradicted by director Ramón Calderón.

Several years after leaving Real, Fernando Hierro stated that Claude Makélélé had been the club's most important and least appreciated midfielder, saying: "The loss of Makélélé was the beginning of the end for Los Galácticos... You can see that it was also the beginning of a new dawn for Chelsea." From the 2003–04 season to the 2005-06 season with the absence of manager Vicente del Bosque and Makélélé, Real Madrid failed to win a trophy.

Although Pérez's policy resulted in increased financial success based on the exploitation of the club's high marketing potential around the world, especially in Asia, it came under increasing criticism for being focused too much on marketing the Real Madrid brand and not enough on the club’s football. He announced his resignation on 27 February 2006, acknowledging that the team and the club as a whole needed a new direction.

=== Second term ===
On 14 May 2009, Pérez announced his candidacy for president of Real Madrid in a press conference at the Hotel Ritz Madrid. On 1 June, given that he was the only candidate able to provide the €57,389,000 guarantee necessary to run for the presidency, Pérez was announced as the new president of Real Madrid.

In his second term, Pérez continued with the Galácticos policy pursued during his first term. On 8 June, he bought Kaká from Milan for just under £60 million, while on 11 June, Manchester United accepted an £80 million offer for Cristiano Ronaldo, which would once again break the world record. On 25 June, Pérez and Real Madrid announced the signing of Valencia centre-back Raúl Albiol for €15 million. On 1 July, Pérez bought Karim Benzema from Lyon for a fee of at least £30 million, which would increase to £35 million depending on the player's success. On 5 August, Real Madrid confirmed the signing of Xabi Alonso from Liverpool for £30 million; Alonso became the second Liverpool player to join Real Madrid in the same transfer window after full-back Álvaro Arbeloa's £5 million switch to the Bernabéu in July. On 31 May 2010, Pérez appointed José Mourinho as the new manager of Real Madrid in a £6.8 million deal.

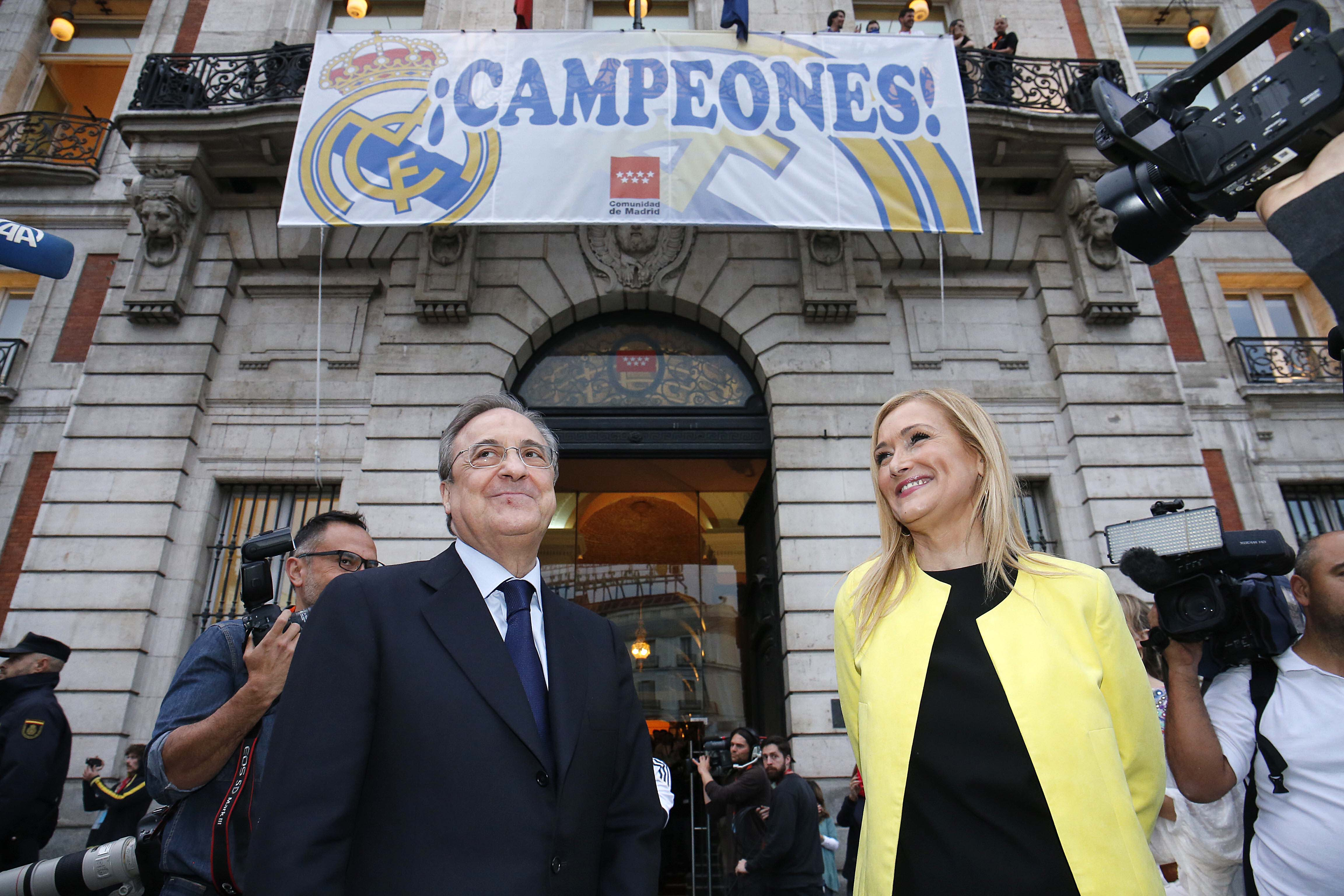
Pérez with President of the Community of Madrid Cristina Cifuentes in a Champions League trophy presentation ceremony at Puerta del Sol in 2016

During the next three years, Pérez brought a lot of new faces to the team, including the German wonderkid Mesut Özil and Ángel Di María, who both attracted attention from Europe's elite football clubs during the 2010 World Cup in South Africa. The squad managed to break Barcelona's dominance, winning the Copa del Rey in 2011 and winning the La Liga title in 2012 with a record-breaking 100 points. Additionally, in 2011, Real Madrid reached the semi-finals of the Champions League for the first time since 2003. In his third season, Mourinho led the team to its third consecutive Champions League semi-finals, second place in the league, and the Copa del Rey final, where Real lost to Atlético after extra time. However, the lack of trophies prompted Mourinho to leave Madrid for his former club Chelsea.

On 2 June 2013, Pérez was awarded a fourth term as the Real Madrid president, bringing in Carlo Ancelotti to replace Mourinho. Mesut Özil and Gonzalo Higuaín were sold to Arsenal and Napoli, respectively, at the start of the season to secure spots for Luka Modrić and Karim Benzema in the first team. Pérez also brought in Welsh footballer and PFA Player of the Year Gareth Bale, purchased from Tottenham Hotspur for a fee reported to be in the £86 million range, yet again breaking the world record. Two promising Spanish talents, playmaker Isco and holding midfielder Asier Illarramendi, were also bought by Pérez prior to the start of the season. The following season proved to be a resounding success, as Real Madrid won the Copa del Rey and its tenth Champions League title.

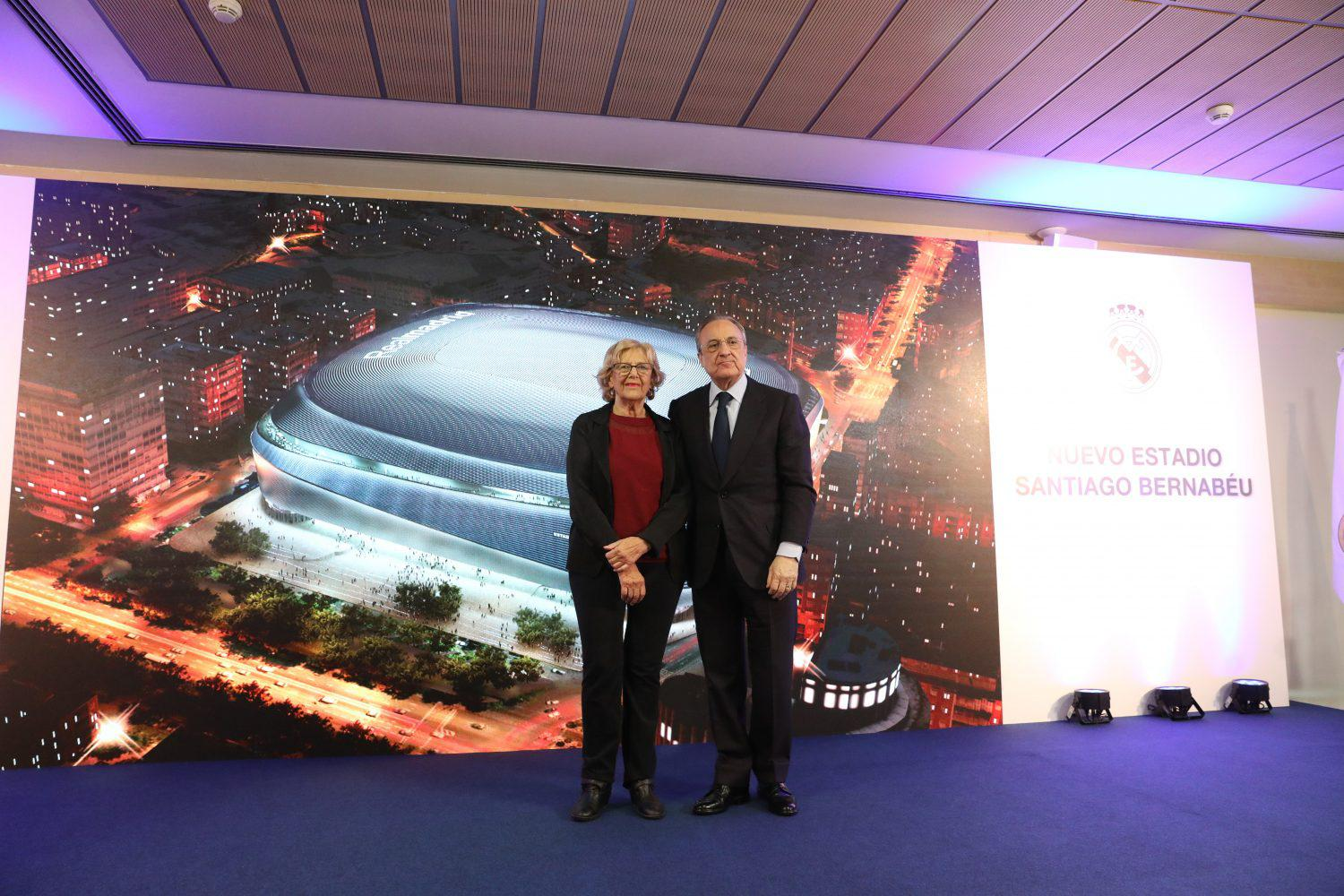
Pérez with Mayor of Madrid Manuela Carmena in 2019, presenting the New Santiago Bernabéu

During the 2014 summer transfer window, Pérez brought in 2014 FIFA World Cup stars James Rodríguez, Toni Kroos, and Keylor Navas to Real Madrid for a combined cost of £95 million, as well as Javier Hernández, who was loan from Manchester United. As a result of the mounting competition for starting spots and wage disputes, Di María left the club for Manchester United for a British record transfer fee of £60 million. Xabi Alonso also left during this transfer window to join Bayern Munich. In January 2015, Pérez demonstrated his success in the transfer market when Real Madrid signed the 16-year-old Norwegian Martin Ødegaard, as many other European clubs, including Bayern, Barcelona, and Arsenal, were also interested in Ødegaard.

Later on, Real Madrid, coached by former player Frenchman Zinedine Zidane, proceeded to win three consecutive Champions League titles in 2015–16, 2016–17 and 2017–18, a feat that hasn't been achieved since Bayern Munich had won their third consecutive title in 1975–76. In 2019, Pérez revealed the plans to renovate the Santiago Bernabéu Stadium.

In the 2019–20 season, Real Madrid won their 34th La Liga title, which was their fifth title under Pérez and second title under coach Zidane. In the 2021–22 season, Real Madrid won their sixth La Liga and sixth Champions League title under Pérez, and he equalled the Champions League record of Santiago Bernabéu.

In the 2021–22 season, with the return of Carlo Ancelotti as coach, Real Madrid achieved a historic double: winning the La Liga title and winning its 14th Champions League, totaling 35 league titles. In addition, Real Madrid won its fifth European Super Cup. In the same year, Real Madrid Baloncesto won the ACB League and the Spanish Super Cup.

In the 2022–23 season, Real Madrid won the final of the Copa del Rey at La Cartuja in Seville, obtaining its twentieth title after nine years without winning the trophy. The team also reached the semifinals of the Champions League where it was eliminated by Manchester City, and finished second place in La Liga behind Barcelona, despite maintaining a larger points difference. At the same time, Real Madrid was crowned champion of the Euroleague Basketball League in the same season, thus winning its eleventh title in this continental competition.

Currently, Pérez simultaneously holds the role of president of the renowned Real Madrid. His relationship with the club, considered the best of the 20th century, has materialized in two periods in which he has managed to harmonize his business work with the management of the football institution.

During his tenure as president of Real Madrid, Pérez has established a legacy characterized by consistently high economic revenues. The club has maintained its position as the global leader in current revenue for over ten consecutive years. Additionally, Pérez's management has had a notable impact on the sporting front, with Real Madrid winning the prestigious European Cup seven times, adding to a total of fifteen trophies in the club's collection.

Additionally, Forbes has recognized Real Madrid as the most valuable sports club in the world, with Los Blancos having a value of US$6.07 billion.

In the 2023–24 season, Real Madrid clinched their 36th La Liga title in total and seventh Champions League title during his presidency, surpassing Santiago Bernabéu's Champions League record. In January 2025, Pérez was re-elected as club's president until 2029. However, following his re-election, Real Madrid failed to win any championship, leading to a call for early elections scheduled for June 2026. Pérez was re-elected after defeating Enrique Riquelme with 65% of the vote. Following his re-election until 2030, Pérez pledged to continue pursuing Real Madrid's sixteenth European Cup and expressed pride in the return of José Mourinho as head coach.

== European Super League ==
In April 2021, Pérez was named the first chairman of the European Super League, a breakaway league involving some of Europe's largest football clubs. According to The New York Times, Pérez "had been the driving force behind much of it; it was, to some extent, his brainchild." Spearheaded by Pérez and Andrea Agnelli of Juventus, the Super League was in the works for three years; however, the final phases were rushed and the allegiance among the twelve clubs, instead of the original fifteen, seemed to have been forged under pressure. The announcement was poorly planned and the coalition, liable to break under pressure, came apart quickly. Pérez expressed hope that the new competition would "provide higher-quality matches and additional financial resources for the overall football pyramid", provide "significantly greater economic growth and support for European football via a long-term commitment to uncapped solidarity payments which will grow in line with league revenues", appeal to a new younger generation of football fans, and improve VAR and refereeing.

The 18 April announcement of the European Super League (ESL) received almost universal opposition from fans, players, managers, politicians and other clubs as well as UEFA, FIFA and national governments. Much of the criticism against the ESL was due to concerns about elitism and the lack of competitiveness within the competition, as it would have consisted of only high-ranking teams from a few European countries. Backlash against the announcement of the league's formation led to nine of the clubs involved, including all six of the English clubs, announcing their intention to withdraw. The remaining members of the ESL subsequently announced they would "reconsider the most appropriate steps to reshape the project" following the departure of the other clubs. Three days after its founding, the ESL announced that it was suspending its operations.

Commentators argued that the ESL could render domestic competitions as irrelevant and lower tier compared to the Super League, and it would undermine promotion and relegation systems; Pérez later countered this with claims that the ESL would have a system of promotion and relegation. Pérez alleged that Bayern Munich, Borussia Dortmund, and Paris Saint-Germain, which were reportedly sought out by the ESL and gave them between 14 and 30 days to join but who rejected involvement in the competition and publicly condemned the concept, had not been invited. Pérez cited the European basketball EuroLeague as an inspiration and stated that the EuroLeague saved European basketball, and the Super League would do the same for football.

After the backlash and withdrawals, Pérez stated that none of the founding clubs had officially left the association, as they were tied to binding contracts, and vowed to work with the governing bodies to make some form of the Super League work. Whilst blaming the English clubs of losing their nerve in face of opposition and the footballing authorities for acting unjustifiably aggressively, Pérez insisted that the Super League project was merely on standby and not over. In response to UEFA's sanctions and possible Real Madrid's exclusion from UEFA competitions, among the other clubs involved, Pérez said that this would be "impossible" and that the law protects them.

On 31 May, the Super League filed a complaint to the Court of Justice of the European Union (CJEU) against UEFA and FIFA for their proposals to stop the organization of the competition. On June 7, the Swiss Federal Department of Justice and Police notified the Spanish precautionary measure, which had earlier issued an injunction against UEFA and FIFA, and referred a cuestión preliminar (English: preliminary question) to the CJEU on whether UEFA and FIFA have violated articles 101 and 102 of the TFEU, to both governing bodies, ruling them to not execute sanctions against clubs still active in the project, including Real Madrid. On 15 June, it was officially confirmed Real Madrid, Barcelona, and Juventus were admitted to the 2021–22 UEFA Champions League.

On 31 January 2014 Pérez announced the winning project of the competition to design the new Santiago Bernabéu. The new stadium is enveloped by a roof with an LED system that vibrates and allows the stadium to communicate with its surroundings and the eastern façade features a giant screen to show the inside of the stadium at special moments. This sustainable project is also equipped with the latest technological advances, making it safer and more comfortable for fans.

The new Bernabéu is also planned to include commercial, leisure, and restaurant areas as well as hotel parking and subway parking; the works are designed to allow construction to take place without disrupting the sporting calendar.

In July 2021, the media El Confidencial published audio of Pérez in which he included a series of remarks towards some players. However, Real Madrid had issued a statement claiming that the leaks came at a time when Pérez was involved in promoting the Super League. At a later date, the court of first instance number 42 of Madrid considered that Florentino Pérez's right to honour was violated by broadcasting the recordings and prohibiting the media from publishing any audio that directly affects him.

In 2022, an unauthorized biography titled El poder del palco was published about Pérez, in which the Spanish journalist Fonsi Loaiza explores the role of the Santiago Bernabeu VIP area in Pérez's business success, highlighting his network of connections.

At the first home game of the 2023–24 season, against Getafe, the new renovations of the Santiago Bernabéu, including the retractable roof, were unveiled for the first time. Although work on the new stadium was expected to be completed in 2024, the final cost is estimated at around €1.17 billion, more than double the initial estimate (€525 million). However, Florentino Pérez emphasized that the new stadium will become one of the city's main tourist destinations and the epicenter of major events in Europe.

During December 2023, the Court of Justice of the European Union (CJEU) ruled that FIFA and UEFA's rules on the prior authorization of club soccer competitions, such as the Super League, violate EU law. The court stated that UEFA and FIFA abused their "dominant position" by threatening the clubs involved in the Super League with sanctions. This affected several clubs, such as the Real Madrid, which backed the project in Spain along with other well-known clubs.

== Personal life ==
Pérez married María de los Ángeles Sandoval Montero in 1970 and they had three children: Eduardo, Florentino, and María Ángeles. His wife died on 23 May 2012, aged 62, due to a heart attack.

During the COVID-19 pandemic, Pérez tested positive on 2 February 2021, but had no symptoms.

== Honours ==
=== Football ===
Real Madrid:

- La Liga:
  - 2000–01, 2002–03, 2011–12, 2016–17, 2019–20, 2021–22, 2023–24
- Copa del Rey:
  - 2010–11, 2013–14, 2022–23
- Supercopa de España:
  - 2001, 2003, 2012, 2017, 2020, 2022, 2024
- UEFA Champions League:
  - 2001–02, 2013–14, 2015–16, 2016–17, 2017–18, 2021–22, 2023–24
- UEFA Super Cup:
  - 2002, 2014, 2016, 2017, 2022, 2024
- Intercontinental Cup:
  - 2002
- FIFA Club World Cup:
  - 2014, 2016, 2017, 2018, 2022
- FIFA Intercontinental Cup:
  - 2024

=== Basketball ===
Real Madrid Basketball:

- Liga ACB:
  - 2004–05, 2012–13, 2014–15, 2015–16, 2017–18, 2018–19, 2021–22, 2023–24, 2024–25
- Copa del Rey de Baloncesto:
  - 2012, 2014, 2015, 2016, 2017, 2020, 2024
- Supercopa de España de Baloncesto:
  - 2012, 2013, 2014, 2018, 2019, 2020, 2021, 2022, 2023
- EuroLeague:
  - 2014–15, 2017–18, 2022–23
- FIBA Intercontinental Cup:
  - 2015

== Awards ==
- Grand Cross of the Order of the Second of May (2011)
- Golden Foot Prestige: 2022
- Special Career Award: 2024
