= Ramón Calderón =

Spanish lawyer (born 1951)

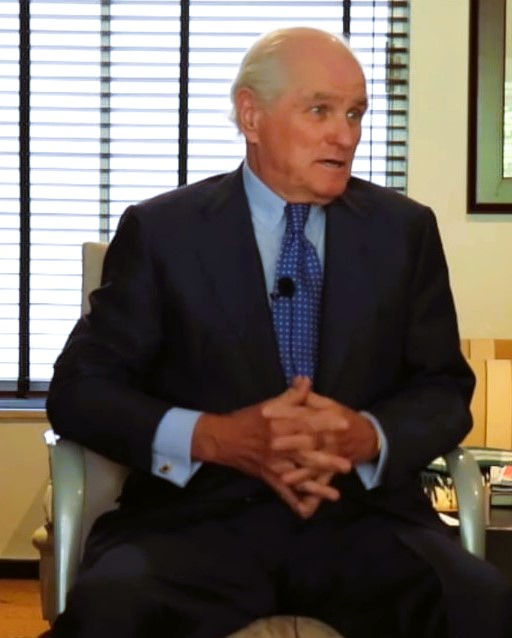
- Calderón in 2019

16th President of Real Madrid
- In office 2 July 2006 – 16 January 2009
- Preceded by: Florentino Pérez; Fernando Martín Álvarez (unofficial); Luis Gómez-Montejano (acting)
- Succeeded by: Vicente Boluda

Personal details
- Born: José Ramón Calderón Ramos; 26 May 1951 (age 75) Palencia, Spain
- Education: University of Navarra
- Occupation: Lawyer
- Known for: Former President of Real Madrid

José Ramón Calderón Ramos (born 26 May 1951) is a Spanish lawyer who is the former President of Real Madrid. He got his Law Degree in the University of Navarra, Spain in 1974 and he worked in London, England, as a lawyer, in 1975 and 1976. A member of the Madrid Bar Association since 1976, Calderón opened his Law Firm: Calderon Abogados, where he has been working during the last 40 years.

== Life and career ==
Calderón was the 16th President of Real Madrid from 2 July 2006 until 16 January 2009 and also club Director from 2001 to 2006. He has also been the Director of the Royal Spanish Football Federation (RFEF), President of the Centenary Committee and, on the international level, was appointed Vice-President of UEFA's Club Competition Committee, and Director of the FIFA Club World Cup Committee, being an active and prominent participant and collaborator with UEFA and FIFA. As Real Madrid's president, the club won two La Liga championships and one Spanish Super Cup. He hired Fabio Capello as manager in his first year and Bernd Schuster, in the second one. Amongst his promises when running for election was the signing of Arjen Robben from Chelsea, Cesc Fàbregas from Arsenal and Kaká from Milan. He was only successful with Robben.

On 19 July 2006, Calderón announced his first two signings, Fabio Cannavaro and Emerson; both signed from newly demoted Juventus for an estimated €20 million. He later signed Ruud van Nistelrooy from Manchester United and Mahamadou Diarra from Lyon, as well as delivering on his promise to acquire Robben from Chelsea. A yearlong loan swap deal was also concluded with José Antonio Reyes from Arsenal moving to Real Madrid in exchange for Júlio Baptista. Before the start of the 2008–09 season, Calderón tried to bring Cristiano Ronaldo to the club, but failed in doing so as the player wanted to stay one more year at Manchester United. Finally, on 12 December 2008, he managed to sign the contract with the Portuguese player for the next 6 years, after having agreed a transfer fee of €94 million with United.

Calderón was major proponent and driving force behind the club's social and institutional transformation. While at the helm, he strengthened Real Madrid's social responsibility programs as well as the activities of its foundation (where he is currently a member of the board) opening several academies around the world to help children improve their lives. During his presidency, the club increased substantially the turnover and doubled the income for TV rights. He was also president of the Insurance Broker Association of Madrid, and founder of the Spanish Insurance Broker Association. Calderón also served as either a member, or secretary of the board in several national and international companies. Currently, he workes in his law office in Madrid where he has been practising during 40 years, and participates regularly on TV and Radio Football Programs in Spain and abroad (beIN Sports, BBC, Sky Sports, Talksport, ESPN, SiriuxRadio, Newsweek and others)

On 16 January 2009 and after many pressures, Calderón decided to resign as Real Madrid president following allegations of vote-rigging for the confirmation for the financial budget.

== Honours ==
=== Football ===
Real Madrid:

- La Liga:
  - 2006–07, 2007–08
- Supercopa de España:
  - 2008

=== Basketball ===
Real Madrid Basketball:

- Liga ACB:
  - 2006–07
- EuroCup:
  - 2006–07
