= Rafaela Pimenta =

Brazilian football agent (born 1972)

- Born: Rafaela Vitale Pimenta; 1972 (age 53–54)
- Occupations: Football agent; Lawyer
- Years active: 2022–present

Rafaela Vitale Pimenta is a Brazilian football agent and former lawyer. She is regarded as one of the first female football "super-agents". She initially worked under Mino Raiola before inheriting all of his clients after Raiola's death in 2022, including Erling Haaland, Santiago Giménez, Arne Slot and Paul Pogba, among others.
