= List of Spanish billionaires by net worth =

This is a list of Spanish billionaires based on an annual assessment of wealth and assets compiled and published by Forbes magazine in 2023.

== 2023 Spanish billionaires list ==
World Rank	Name	Net worth (USD)	Source of wealth
13	Amancio Ortega Gaona	103 billion	Textiles & fashion (Inditex).
787	Juan Roig Alfonso	7.3 billion	Supermarkets (Mercadona).
344	Sandra Ortega Mera	6.9 billion	Inditex. Daughter of Amancio.
624	Rafael del Pino Calvo-Sotelo	4.4 billion	Son of Rafael del Pino. Construction (Ferrovial)
949	Daniel Maté	3.1 billion	Mining, commodities (Glencore)
1027	Isak Andic & family	2.9 billion	Fashion retail (Mango), banking.
1104	Juan Abelló Gallo	2.7 billion	Investments (multiple).
1104	Miquel Fluxà Rosselló	2.7 billion	Hotels (Iberostar).
1164	Maria del Pino y Calvo-Sotelo	2.6 billion	Daughter of Rafael del Pino and sister of Rafael del Pino Calvo-Sotelo. Construction (Ferrovial).
1164	Alicia Koplowitz y Romero de Joseu	2.6 billion	7th Marchioness of Bellavista, GE. Construction (FCC), investments.
1217	Tomás Olivo López	2.5 billion	Right hand of late Jesús Gil. Shopping centers & real state.
1434	Hortensia Herrero Chacón	2.1 billion	Wife of Juan Roig. Supermarkets (Mercadona), fashion
1434	Florentino Pérez	2.1 billion	Construction (ACS), association football (Real Madrid)
1575	Sol Daurella	1.9 billion	Member of the wealthy Daurella family. Coca-Cola bottler.
1647	Leopoldo del Pino y Calvo-Sotelo	1.8 billion	Son of Rafael del Pino and brother of Rafael del Pino Calvo-Sotelo. Construction (Ferrovial).
1725	Alberto Palatchi	1.7 billion	Wedding dresses (Pronovias).
1804	Francisco José Riberas Mera	1.6 billion	Steel, automotive industry (Gestamp).
1804	Juan María Riberas Mera	1.6 billion	Steel, automotive industry (Gestamp).
1905	Carmen Cervera	1.5 billion	Investments, art
2020	Alberto Alcocer Torra	1.4 billion	Nephew of Pedro Cortina Mauri and cousin of Alberto Cortina. Construction (ACS), investments.
2133	Alberto Cortina Alcocer	1.3 billion	Son of Pedro Cortina Mauri. Construction (ACS), investments.
2133	Fernando Roig Alfonso	1.3 billion	Brother of Juan Roig. Supermarkets (Mercadona).
2259	José María Aristraín	1.2 billion	Steel (Arcelor).
2259	Gabriel Escarrer Julià	1.2 billion	Hotels (Meliá).
2405	Carmen Daurella Aguilera	1.1 billion	Member of the wealthy Daurella family. Coca-Cola bottler.
2405	Helena Revoredo Delvecchio	1.1 billion	Private security. (Widow of Prosegur founder.)
2405	Manuel Lao Hernández	1.1 billion	Gambling & casinos (Cirsa).

== See also ==
- The World's Billionaires
- List of countries by the number of billionaires
