= Roig family =

The Roig family is a Spanish business family from Valencia. Francisco Roig Ballester (1912–2003) founded Pamesa Cerámica in 1972 and the supermarket Mercadona in 1977. In 1981 he was bought out of Mercadona by four of his children and one daughter-in-law; Juan Roig then bought out his siblings in 1991. Eldest child Francisco Roig Alfonso was president of football club Valencia CF from 1994 to 1997, and Fernando Roig became president of Pamesa and of Villarreal CF in 1997.

== Francisco Roig Ballester and Trinidad Alfonso Mocholí ==
Francisco Roig Ballester (1912–2003) was orphaned in childhood and raised by his uncle Vicente. He married Trinidad Alfonso Mocholí in 1937 and they had five sons and two daughters; Francisco, Amparo, Vicente, Trinidad, Fernando, Juan and Alfonso. He founded Cárnicas Roig, eight butchers' shops and later groceries in La Pobla de Farnals. This business became Mercadona in 1977, and four years later he was bought out by his children Juan, Fernando, Amparo and Trinidad, as well as Juan's wife Hortensia Herrero. In 1978, according to the Ministry of Finance, Roig was the 39th richest person in Spain, with a wealth of 2.4 billion Spanish pesetas (around US$33 million).

Trinidad Alfonso Mocholí (1911–2006) co-founded Mercadona with her husband. Her son Juan created a charitable foundation in her name.

== Francisco Roig Alfonso ==
Francisco Roig Alfonso (born 1939) is the oldest child of Francisco Roig Ballester and Trinidad Alfonso Mocholí, born during the Spanish Civil War. He worked from 1979 to 1988 on his business interests in Equatorial Guinea. In March 1994 he was elected president of La Liga football club Valencia CF, and invested heavily but won no trophies during his mandate, which ended with his resignation in November 1997. After selling his shares for €31.5 million to Juan Soler in 2004, he returned to the football business between September 2005 and May 2006 by holding 38% of the shares in Hércules CF.

== Fernando Roig ==
Fernando Roig (born 1947) is the fifth child of Francisco Roig Ballester and Trinidad Alfonso Mocholí. He was part of the consortium that bought his father out of Mercadona in 1981, and remains owner of 9% of the company, as well as owning Pamesa Cerámica. In May 1997, he bought Villarreal CF, then a Segunda División football club, and oversaw achievements such as promotion to La Liga, UEFA Champions League semi-finals, and winning the UEFA Europa League in 2020–21. He is married to artist Elena Negueroles, with whom he has a son and a daughter.

== Juan Roig ==
Juan Roig (born 1949) is the sixth of seven children of Francisco Roig Ballester and Trinidad Alfonso Mocholí. In 1981, he, three siblings and his wife Hortensia Herrero bought his father out of Mercadona, and in 1991 he bought out his siblings to obtain a majority of the company. As of September 2026, Mercadona has the largest market share in supermarkets in Spain, at 27.4%. He is also the owner of Valencia Basket in Liga ACB, and provided the entire €400 million budget of their Roig Arena that opened in 2025. According to Forbes in November 2025, he is the fourth richest person in Spain, with a wealth of €7.9 billion, and Herrero is the seventh, with €4.4 billion.

== Other members ==
Francisco Roig Ballester's daughters, Amparo and Trinidad, were part of the consortium that bought him out of Mercadona in 1981. They sold their shares to their brother Juan in 1991. One of Roig Ballester's sons, Vicente, died of meningitis in 1960. The youngest child, Alfonso, died at age 69 in May 2020. He was disabled, and Juan Roig set up a charitable foundation in his memory to support disabled employment.
