= Rafael del Pino =

Rafael del Pino may refer to:

- Rafael del Pino (pilot) (born 1938), Cuban aviator and political dissident
- Rafael del Pino (businessman) (1920–2008), Spanish construction industry entrepreneur
- Rafael del Pino Calvo-Sotelo, Spanish rail entrepreneur, son of the construction industry entrepreneur
