= Francisco Roig (disambiguation) =

Francisco Roig (born 1968) is a Spanish tennis coach and former player.

Francisco Roig may also refer to:

- Francisco Roig Ballester (1912–2003), Spanish businessman
- Francisco Roig Alfonso (born 1939), Spanish businessman, son of Francisco Roig Ballester
