= Isak Andic =

Turkish-Spanish billionaire businessman (1953–2024)

İsak Andiç Ermay
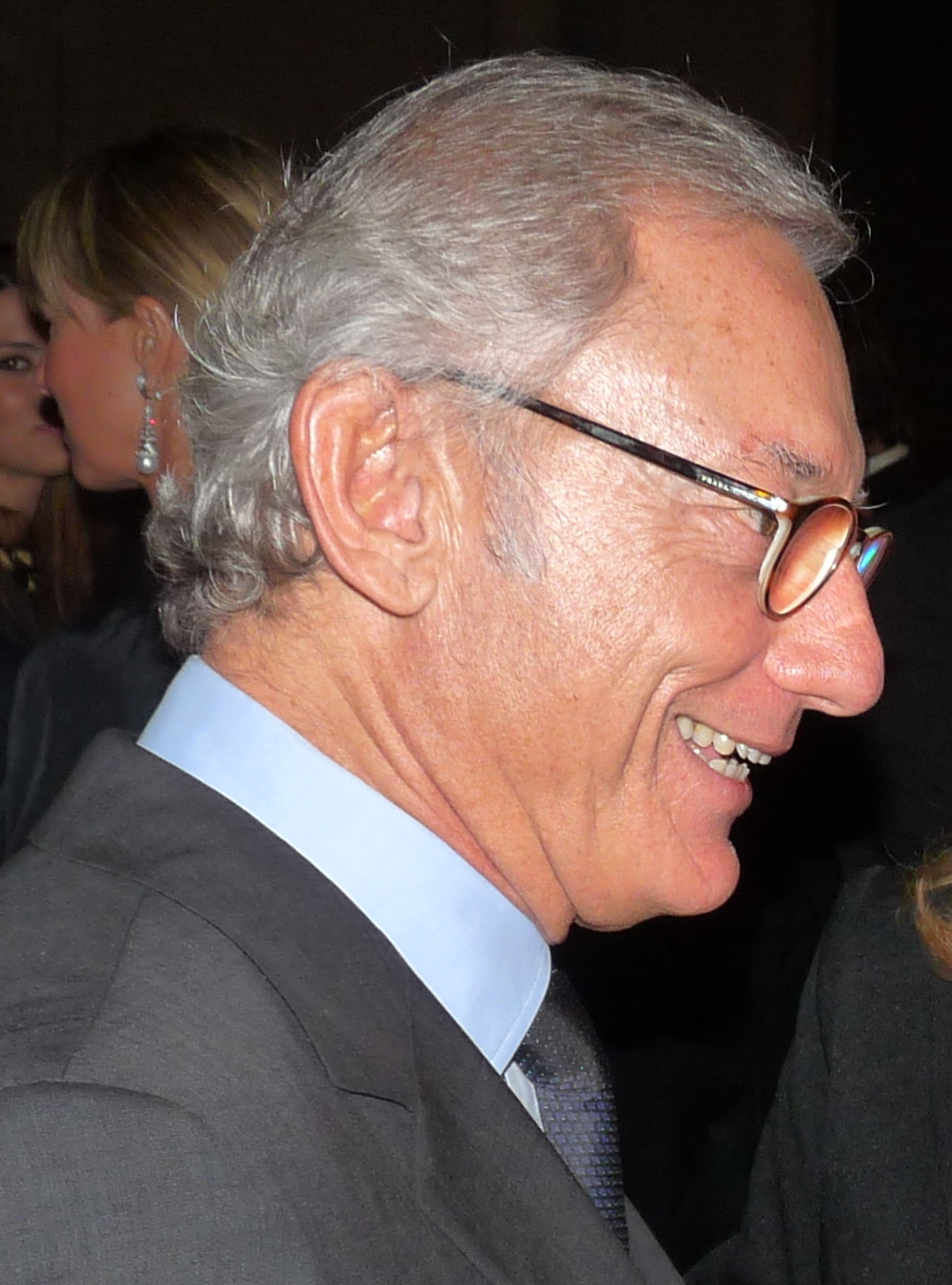
- Andiç in 2010
- Born: 1 October 1953; Istanbul, Turkey
- Died: 14 December 2024 (aged 71); Collbató, Catalonia, Spain
- Citizenship: Turkish; Spanish
- Occupation: Businessman
- Spouse: Neus Raig Tarragó (divorced)
- Children: 3

İsak Andiç Ermay (1 October 1953 – 14 December 2024) was a Turkish-Spanish businessman, co-founder of clothing retailer Mango. As Mango's largest shareholder, Andiç was worth an estimated US$4.5 billion at the time of his death, making him the richest person in Catalonia and one of the richest in Spain. Andiç was also the second richest person in Turkey after Murat Ülker.

== Early life ==
Andic was born to a Sephardic Jewish family in Istanbul, Turkey, on 1 October 1953.

== Career ==
=== Initial business ===
Andic's family emigrated from Turkey to Barcelona, Spain in 1969 where he and his brother Nahman began selling hand-embroidered "made-in-Turkey" T-shirts and clogs. They opened shops in Barcelona and Madrid, first selling their own brand (Isak Jeans) and then stocking other brands.

He continued selling to stores across Madrid, Barcelona, and other Spanish cities before opening his first retail space at Barcelona's Balmes market in 1973. Between 1973 and 1984, he launched several multi-brand wholesale stores in Barcelona under the name Izak.

=== Mango ===
In 1984, at age 31, Andic met entrepreneur Enric Casi, who helped him pivot to a unified global brand and distribution chain: Mango. That year, alongside his brother Nahman and Casi, he opened the company's first store on Barcelona's prestigious Passeig de Gràcia.

In 1984, he joined with fellow entrepreneur Enric Cusí and his brother and re-denominated all their stores under the name Mango. Andic chose the name "Mango" after tasting the fruit on a trip to the Philippines. Isak Andic was the co-founder and majority shareholder of the Spanish fashion group Mango, which operated in 109 countries by 2012 with over 2,500 stores and annual revenues exceeding €2 billion. The company employed 11,000 people directly, 83% of whom were women. Unlike its rival Inditex, Mango relied heavily on a network of franchisees, with only 13% of Amancio Ortega’s empire (a figure Andic publicly admired) operating under franchise models as of that time. Inditex traditionally focused on directly owned stores, though a shift toward franchising began in 2015. Despite differing business models, parallels exist between the two fashion magnates: both invested heavily in purchasing prime retail properties on iconic shopping streets worldwide.

By 1994, the Andic brothers had expanded to 100 stores in Spain and began international growth, with Enric Casi leading as general manager for two decades.

Andic was perceived to have been in a business rivalry with Amancio Ortega, the founder of Zara, another Spanish fashion retailer.

=== Other roles ===
In 2006, Andic was appointed a director of Banco Sabadell and in 2012, became its single largest shareholder with a 7% ownership interest.

Beyond serving as executive chairman of Mango, Andic held leadership roles in several institutions: Vice Chairman of Banco Sabadell (until September 2013), member of IESE's International Advisory Board (IAB), the Catalan Government's International Advisory Board, and the Investment Advisory Council for Turkey. From 2010 to April 2012, he chaired Spain's Family Business Institute. He also served as a trustee for the Princess of Asturias Foundation and the Princess of Girona Foundation.

Andic was a member of IESE's International Advisory Board (IAB).

== Wealth ==
By 2010, Andic ranked as Spain's second-wealthiest individual, later surpassed by entrepreneurs like Juan Roig Alfonso. In 2011, Forbes listed him 221st among the world's richest people, with an estimated net worth of $4.8 billion.

According to Forbes, Andic's net worth as of November 2023 was €2.7 billion, making him the richest person in Catalonia. In 2010, he was the 32nd richest Jew in the world.

As Mango's largest shareholder, Andic was worth an estimated US$4.5 billion at the time of his death, making him the richest person in Catalonia and one of the richest in Spain.

== Personal life ==
Andic was divorced from Neus Raig Tarragó with whom he had three children: Jonathan Andic (born 1981) who was named his successor in 2012; Judith Andic (born 1984), who also works for Mango; and Sarah Andic (born 1997). Also, he had a relationship with the Catalan stylist Zenaida Bufill Comadrán. Estefania Knuth was the partner of Andic from 2018 until his death. Andic lived in Barcelona.

Andic was awarded the Kingdom of Spain Entrepreneurial Career Award in 2024.

=== Death ===
On 14 December 2024, Andic died in an accident in the Salnitre de Collbató caves in the Montserrat mountains near Barcelona, Spain. Although the Spanish newspapers gave conflicting reports over whether he fell off a cliff or fell down a ravine, Andic's death was confirmed by Pedro Sánchez, the Prime Minister of Spain. Police were reportedly called to the scene after Andic slipped and fell 150 meters to his death. A helicopter, ambulance and a specialized mountain unit were also reportedly called to the scene. One Spanish newspaper described the area in which Andic fell an "area of difficult access". Members of Andic's family, including his son, were with him at the time of the accident.

Mango CEO Toni Ruiz said of Andic's death on social media, "His departure leaves a huge void but all of us are, in some way, his legacy and the testimony of his achievements." Catalan president Salvador Illa said Andic "contributed to making Catalonia great and projecting it to the world."

In October 2025, El País reported Andic's son, Jonathan Andic is now under investigation for alleged homicide in his father's death. The newspaper cited, in the investigation, that Jonathan was the only one accompanying him on that day, and inconsistencies in his statements raised suspicions.

On 19 May 2026, his son, Jonathan Andic was arrested in Barcelona. Authorities have released few details about the investigation, which remains under judicial secrecy, Catalonia's High Court said Tuesday. Jonathan Andic has denied any responsibility for his father's death and has maintained that the fall was accidental.

== See also ==
- List of Spanish billionaires by net worth
- List of Sephardic Jews
