= Viaducto =

Viaducto may refer to:

== Argentina ==
- Estadio Julio Humberto Grondona, or the Estadio Viaducto, a multi-use stadium in Buenos Aires

== Chile ==
- Malleco Viaduct (Viaducto del Malleco) is a railway bridge located in central Chile

== Mexico ==
- Viaducto Miguel Alemán, a freeway in Mexico City
- Viaducto metro station, a metro station in Mexico City
- Viaducto (Mexico City Metrobús), a BRT station in Mexico City
- Puente de la Unidad or Viaducto de la Unidad, a cable-stayed bridge that connects the cities of Monterrey and San Pedro Garza García in the state of Nuevo León

== Spain ==
- Viaducto de Montabliz, a bridge located in the town of Montabliz, Cantabria
