= Francisco Roig Ballester =

Spanish businessman (1912–2003)

Francisco Roig Ballester (15 February 1912 – 14 March 2003) was a Spanish businessman. He founded Pamesa Cerámica in 1972 and the supermarket Mercadona in 1977.

== Biography ==
Born in Poble Nou, a village in the municipality of Valencia, Roig was orphaned at an early age and raised by his uncle Vicente. His first company was Cárnicas Roig, eight butchers' shops and later groceries in La Pobla de Farnals. He founded Mercadona with his wife in 1977, and four years later he was bought out by four of his children and daughter-in-law Hortensia Herrero. In 1978, Roig was the 39th richest person in Spain, with a wealth of 2.4 billion Spanish pesetas (around US$33 million) according to the Ministry of Finance. He received the Medal of Merit for Labour.

Roig married Trinidad Alfonso Mocholí during the Spanish Civil War, and they had five sons and two daughters. Juan became primary shareholder in Mercadona in 1991 and also owns Valencia Basket, Francisco was president of Valencia CF from 1994 to 1997, and Fernando is president of Pamesa Cerámica and Villarreal CF since 1997.

== See also ==
- List of grocers
- List of Valencians
