= Jonathan Andic =

Spanish businessman and son of Mango founder Isak Andic

- Born: 1981 (age 44–45); Barcelona, Spain
- Education: IESE Business School (Executive MBA)
- Occupation: Businessman
- Title: Vice chairman, Mango
- Term: 2012–present
- Criminal charge(s): Suspected homicide (under investigation; no conviction)
- Parent: Isak Andic (father)

Jonathan Andic (born 1981) is a Spanish businessman and the eldest son of Isak Andic (1953–2024), the Istanbul-born founder of the Mango fashion group. He was director of the Mango Man menswear line from 2007, and vice chairman of Mango from 2012. Since early 2025, he has focused on asset and wealth management through the Andic family holding company, Punta Na Holding, S.A., of which he is chairman. He is acknowledged to have been one of three people who were heirs to Mango.

Following the death of his father during a hiking trip in December 2024, Andic became the central figure in a criminal investigation into alleged homicide. He was arrested by the Catalan regional police on 19 May 2026 and appeared before a court in Martorell, Barcelona. He has consistently denied any responsibility, maintaining that his father's death was accidental.

== Early life ==
Jonathan Andic was born in 1981 in Barcelona to Isak Andic, who had emigrated from Istanbul to Catalonia with his family in the 1960s, and whose brother Nahman had co-founded Mango's first store on Passeig de Gràcia in 1984, and Catalan mother Neus Raig. He grew up within the Andic family's Sephardic Jewish community in Barcelona. His parents later divorced, though he maintained close ties with his sisters Judith and Sarah, with all three subsequently sharing corporate governance roles in the family holding companies.

== Education ==
Jonathan Andic studied at several schools, including the Swiss boarding school Beau Soleil. Later he studied Audiovisual Communication in the United States before returning to Spain. He subsequently completed further academic training at the IESE Business School in Barcelona — part of the University of Navarra — where he specialised in Accounting and Finance for Directors and completed an Executive MBA (EMBA) in Management.

== Career at Mango ==
Jonathan Andic joined Mango in 2005, initially working in collection design, team management, and the creative process. In 2007, he was appointed to lead the launch of Mango Man, the group's first menswear line, and oversaw its international rollout. By 2024 the division operated more than 600 points of sale across ninety international markets, representing approximately 12% of Mango's total turnover.

From 2012, he also served as a member of Mango's Board of Directors, later becoming vice-chairman. In 2014 his father delegated broader operational responsibilities to him, though Isak Andic reportedly resumed tighter control in 2015 following a period of business difficulties at the group. Jonathan also held oversight of the Communication and Image department and the Interior Design and Construction Management function during his tenure.

Following the death of Isak Andic in December 2024, Mango announced that Jonathan would step back from day-to-day management of Mango Man — handing leadership of the line to Josep Estol — to focus exclusively on corporate governance and wealth management through the family's holding companies, principally Punta Na Holding, S.A., of which he became chairman. Mango stated that the decision had been taken within the family before Isak Andic's death.

== Death of Isak Andic and criminal investigation ==
=== Initial investigation (2024–2025) ===
On 14 December 2024, Isak Andic, aged 71, died after falling more than 100 metres from a cliff on the trail linking the Salnitre caves in Collbató with the Montserrat monastery, a popular hiking route near Barcelona. Jonathan Andic was the sole companion present at the time. In January 2025, a judge closed the case, citing no evidence of criminal wrongdoing. Investigators had initially concluded that Isak Andic may have slipped accidentally.

=== Reopening of the case (2025) ===
In October 2025, the Mossos d'Esquadra, together with prosecutors and the court, reopened the investigation after citing inconsistencies in Jonathan Andic's account of events and other unspecified evidence. Spanish newspaper El País reported that Jonathan had become the primary suspect in a possible homicide investigation. Police examined his mobile telephone as well as those of his sisters Judith and Sarah Andic.

Spanish media reported that the two men were said to have had a tense relationship, and that a serious argument had taken place between them shortly before the incident. Reports also noted financial disputes over the founder's will involving his widow and children. The investigation remained under judicial secrecy throughout this period, as confirmed by the Tribunal Superior de Justícia de Catalunya.

=== Arrest (2026) ===
On 19 May 2026, the Mossos d'Esquadra arrested Jonathan Andic on suspicion of homicide and conveyed him to appear before a court in Martorell, Barcelona, to give a statement as a person under formal investigation (investigado). The arrest was confirmed by Catalan regional police and first reported by the newspaper La Vanguardia. Andic was released after posting a bail of €1 million.

Mango issued a statement saying it "will continue to cooperate, as it has done until now, with the competent authorities," and expressed trust that "this process will be concluded as soon as possible and that it will prove Jonathan Andic's innocence."
