= Autovía A-67 =

Road in Spain

Autovía A-67
- Autovía de Cantabria-Meseta
- Autovía A-67 highlighted in red

Route information
- Length: 178 km (111 mi)

Major junctions
- From: Santander
- To: Palencia

Location
- Country: Spain

Highway system
- Highways in Spain; Autopistas and autovías; National Roads

The Autovía A-67 is a highway in north west Spain. It connects the Cantabrian Atlantic Coast at Santander to Palencia. It follows the route of the N-611.

It forms part of the Autovía A-8 until Torrelavega where it heads south through the Cantabrian Mountains along the Besaya River. After Reinosa the road passes the head of the Ebro Reservoir with the source of the Ebro 3 km (2 mi) to the east. It then passes over Pozazal Pass (987m). The road then passes south west to Aguilar de Campoo. Thereafter the road has yet to be up-graded and follows the valley of the Pisuerga River.

At Osorno la Mayor the road crosses the Autovía A-231 and N-120. The road then crosses Tierra de Campos before meeting the Pisuerga River again at Palencia, where the road meets the Autovía A-62.

Because it crosses the Cantabrian mountain range from north to south, this communication route has routes of great technical complexity, including five viaducts, including the Montabliz viaduct, which became the highest bridge in Spain on its opening day and the sixth in Europe, being the most expensive work on the entire highway. The viaduct crosses the Bisueña river bed 145 meters above the ground.

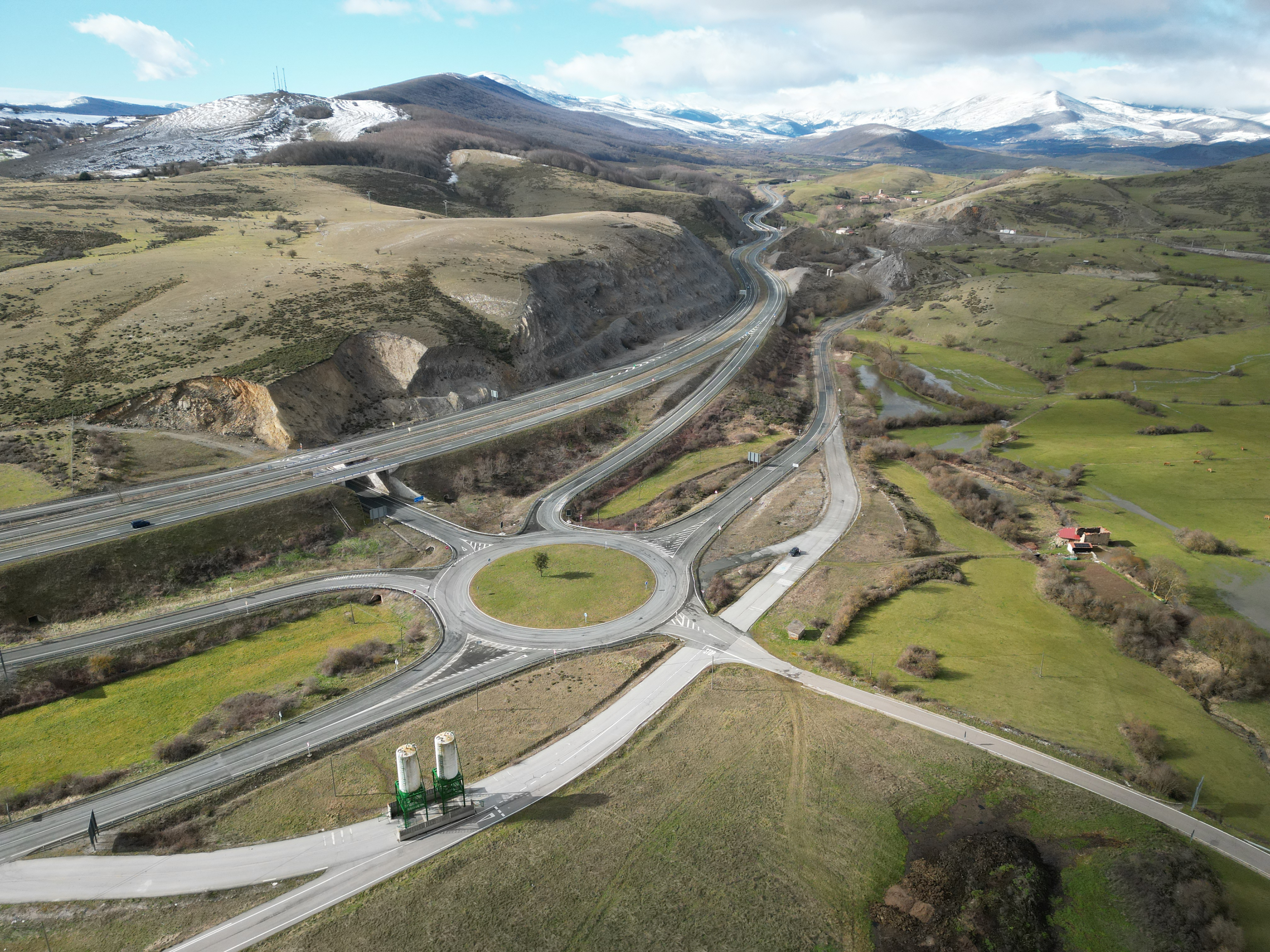
A-67 highway crossing the Cantabrian mountains range, near the Pozazal pass.

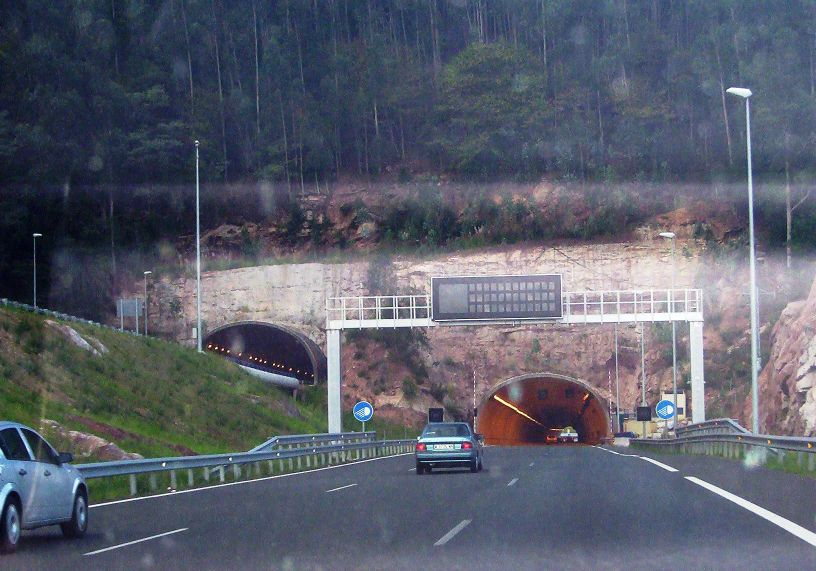
Tunnel of Las Caldas, Cantabria.

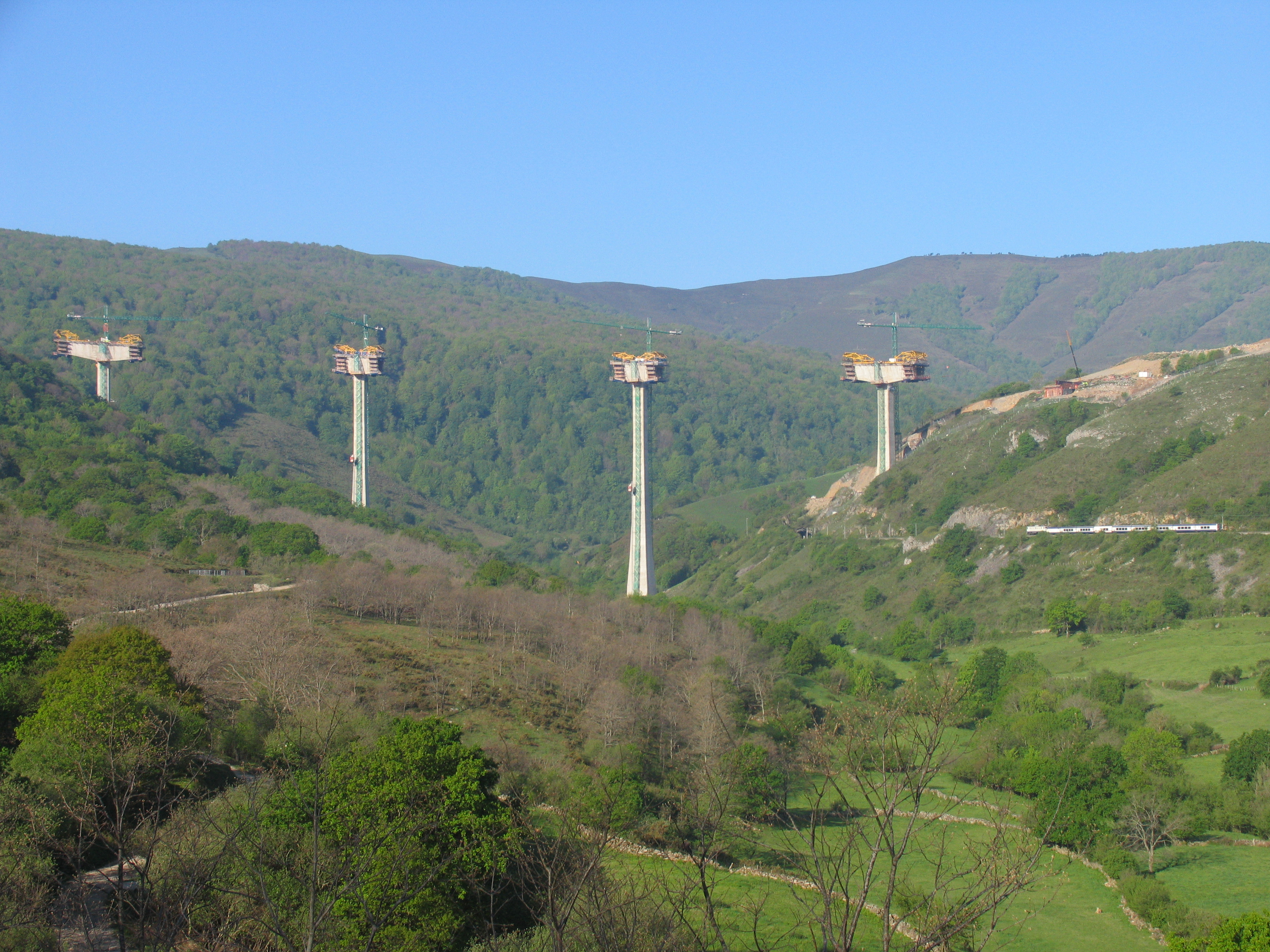
Construction of Viaduct of Montabliz, the highest bridge in Spain.

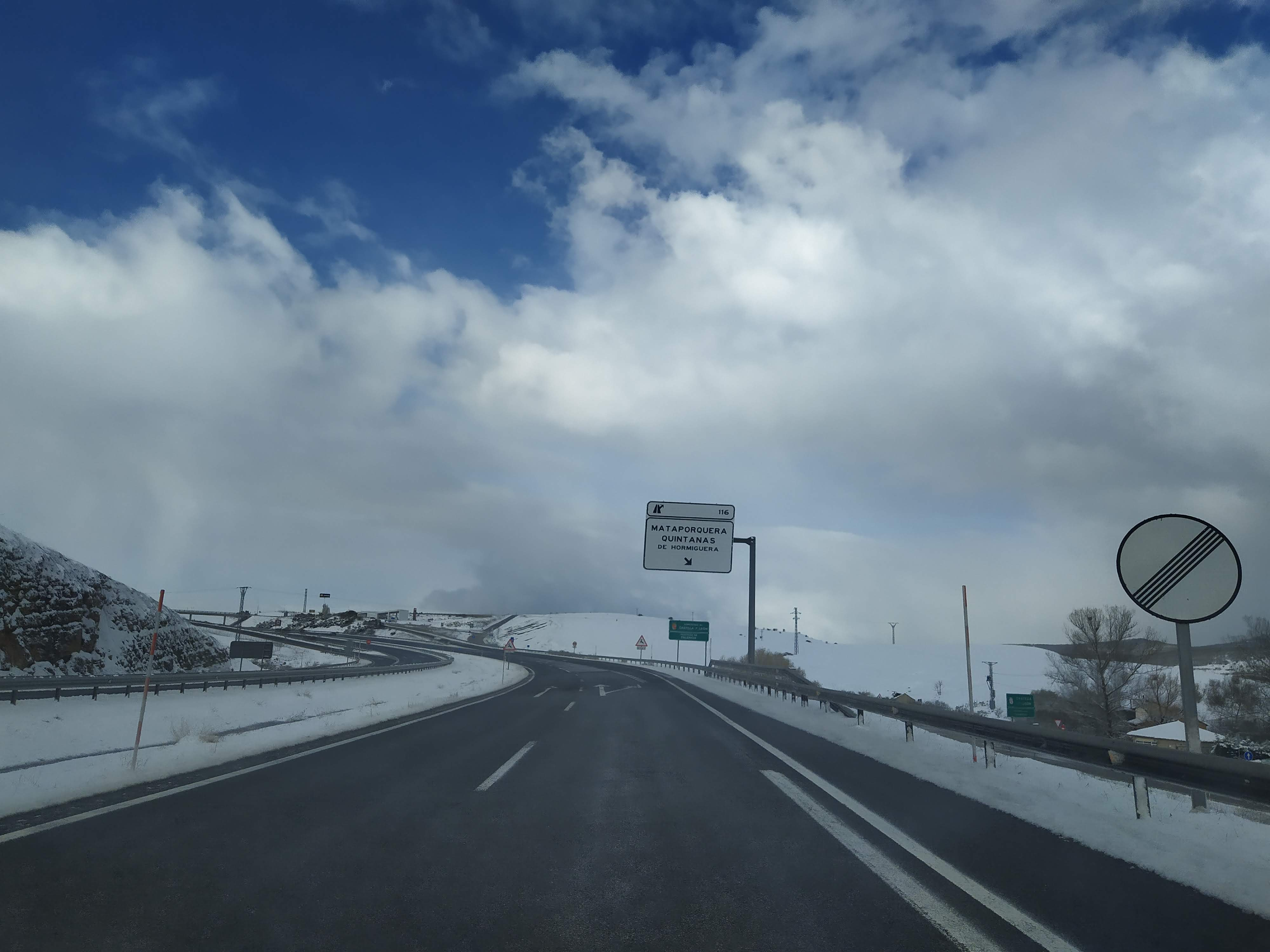
A-67 motorway on the border between Cantabria and Castile and León.
