= Francisco Roig Alfonso =

Francisco "Paco" Roig Alfonso (born 24 February 1939) is a Spanish businessman. He was the president of Valencia CF from 1994 to 1997. During his mandate, the club reached the Copa del Rey final in 1995 and finished as runners-up in La Liga in 1995–96. He held 38% of the shares in Hércules CF from September 2005 to May 2006.

== Early and personal life ==
Roig was born on 24 February 1939 in Poble Nou, a village in the municipality of Valencia. Due to the Spanish Civil War, his birth was not registered until 8 April, after Francisco Franco had taken the city. He was the first of seven children of Francisco Roig Ballester (1912–2003), founder of the supermarket Mercadona and Pamesa Cerámica, and Trinidad Alfonso Mocholí. Among his siblings were Fernando, owner of Pamesa and president of Villarreal CF since 1997; and Juan, majority owner of Mercadona and Valencia Basket.

On 29 September 1962, Roig married Manuela Segarra Soler, from the family behind Calzados Segarra, a boot factory in La Vall d'Uixó in the Province of Castellón. They had three daughters and a son. She died in October 2017. He later married Magdalena Melchor.

In a 2019 interview, Roig called his year of birth, the same year as the end of the civil war, "the year of victory" because his father had been "persecuted by the Reds". He said that he was not a supporter of a political party and had mainly voted for the People's Party and sometimes the Spanish Socialist Workers' Party, and considered there to be an unfair demonisation of Vox.

== Career ==
=== Early career ===
In 1979, Roig went to do business in Equatorial Guinea, in livestock, timber, cacao, coffee and supermarkets. He built up a friendship with dictator Teodoro Obiang, but the two fell out over the costs of building new roads for Roig's timber lorries due to local objection to their use of the existing roads; Roig went to Spain to withdraw money in 1987 and never returned.

=== Valencia CF ===
In March 1994, Roig was elected president of Valencia CF, with the support of holders of 33,813 shares against 24,721 for Ramón Romero, by prioritising small and medium shareholders. Before the 1994 FIFA World Cup, Valencia announced the signing of manager Carlos Alberto Parreira, who went on to win the tournament for Brazil. Roig appointed former Valencia player Jesús Martinez as director of football; Martínez was his brother-in-law by their marriages to a pair of sisters. He gave Martínez La Liga's third-biggest budget of 1.4 billion pesetas (around £7 million), to sign players including Spanish international goalkeeper Andoni Zubizarreta and Brazilian World Cup winner Mazinho. To sign Zubizarreta, Roig personally went to the World Cup in the United States and spent two weeks in the same hotel negotiating. Parreira was dismissed before the end of a season in which Valencia finished 10th and lost the 1995 Copa del Rey final to Deportivo.

In 1995, Roig hired Luis Aragonés as manager, who led Valencia to runners-up position in the 1995–96 La Liga. After the sale of striker Predrag Mijatović to Real Madrid, Roig replaced him with Brazilian World Cup winner Romário, despite Martínez saying that Aragonés did not want the player. Aragonés went on to publicly criticise Roig over transfer policy. Continued disputes led to Aragonés's resignation in November 1996, and fans turned on Roig and Martínez for their alleged nepotism and involvement in the loss of the manager. On 30 November 1997, after losing 1–0 at home to UD Salamanca, Roig resigned.

=== Hércules CF ===
In June 2004, Roig sold all his shares in Valencia CF to Juan Soler for €31.5 million; according to Roig, he bought his shares at a value of €48 each and sold them at a value of €1,020 each. He returned to the football business in September 2005, when Hércules CF majority shareholder Enrique Ortiz sold half of his 76% stake to Roig. The following May, he returned the shares at zero cost.
