= Maria del Pino y Calvo-Sotelo =

Spanish billionaire (born 1956/57)

María del Pino y Calvo-Sotelo
- Born: 1956 or 1957 (age 69–70)
- Education: IESE, University of Navarra
- Spouse: married
- Children: 3
- Parent: Rafael del Pino y Moreno
- Relatives: Rafael del Pino Calvo-Sotelo (brother)

María del Pino y Calvo-Sotelo (born 1956/57) is a Spanish billionaire, and the eldest child of the late billionaire Rafael del Pino y Moreno, who founded Ferrovial. As of February 2026, Forbes estimated her net worth as US$5.8 billion, making her the second richest woman in Spain.
