= Mango (retailer) =

Spanish fashion company

Punto Fa, S.L.
- Type: Sociedad limitada (limited society)
- Industry: Retail
- Founded: Palau-solità i Plegamans, Catalonia, Spain (1984; 42 years ago)
- Founder: Isak Andic; Nahman Andic
- Headquarters: Palau-solità i Plegamans, Spain
- Key people: Toni Ruiz (CEO)
- Products: Clothing, accessories
- Revenue: ▲€2.327 billion (2015)
- Net income: ▲€170 million (2015)
- Number of employees: ▲15,000 (2015)
- Website: shop.mango.com

MANGO MNG S.A., better known by its trade name MANGO, is a Spanish multinational company engaged in the design, manufacture and marketing of garments and accessories for women, men, children, teens and home. Although MANGO began by focusing on women’s fashion, over more than 40 years it has expanded into other business lines such as MANGO Man, MANGO Kids, MANGO Teen and MANGO Home.

Mango has over 18,000 employees worldwide, around 2,200 of whom work at the MANGO Campus, which includes the company’s headquarters in Palau Solità i Plegamans, Barcelona.

The company has nearly 3,000 points of sale across more than 120 markets worldwide. At the end of 2025, its global workforce had an average age of approximately 32 years, and 8 out of 10 of its employees were women.

== History ==
=== 1984–1999 ===
Mango was founded by Sephardic Jewish immigrants from Turkey, Isak Andic and his brother Nahman Andic, in 1984.

Mango's website was created in 1995.

In 1996, MANGO launched its corporate website with the aim of raising the brand's profile worldwide. In 2000, the fashion company made a strategic move into online retail by launching its e-commerce platform, becoming the first Spanish company to sell online and one of the first in Europe. At the end of 2025, its online channel was present in more than 120 markets on five continents and accounted for one-third of the company’s sales.

=== 2000–2019 ===
In 2000, Mango opened its first online store.

H.E. by Mango men's line was created in 2008, and renamed Mango Man in 2014. Football player Zinedine Zidane helped advertise Mango Man.

From the Fall of 2012, Kate Moss was Mango's muse. She first appeared in a video featuring Terry Richardson who shot the campaign and directed the commercial. Moss was replaced by Australian model Miranda Kerr.

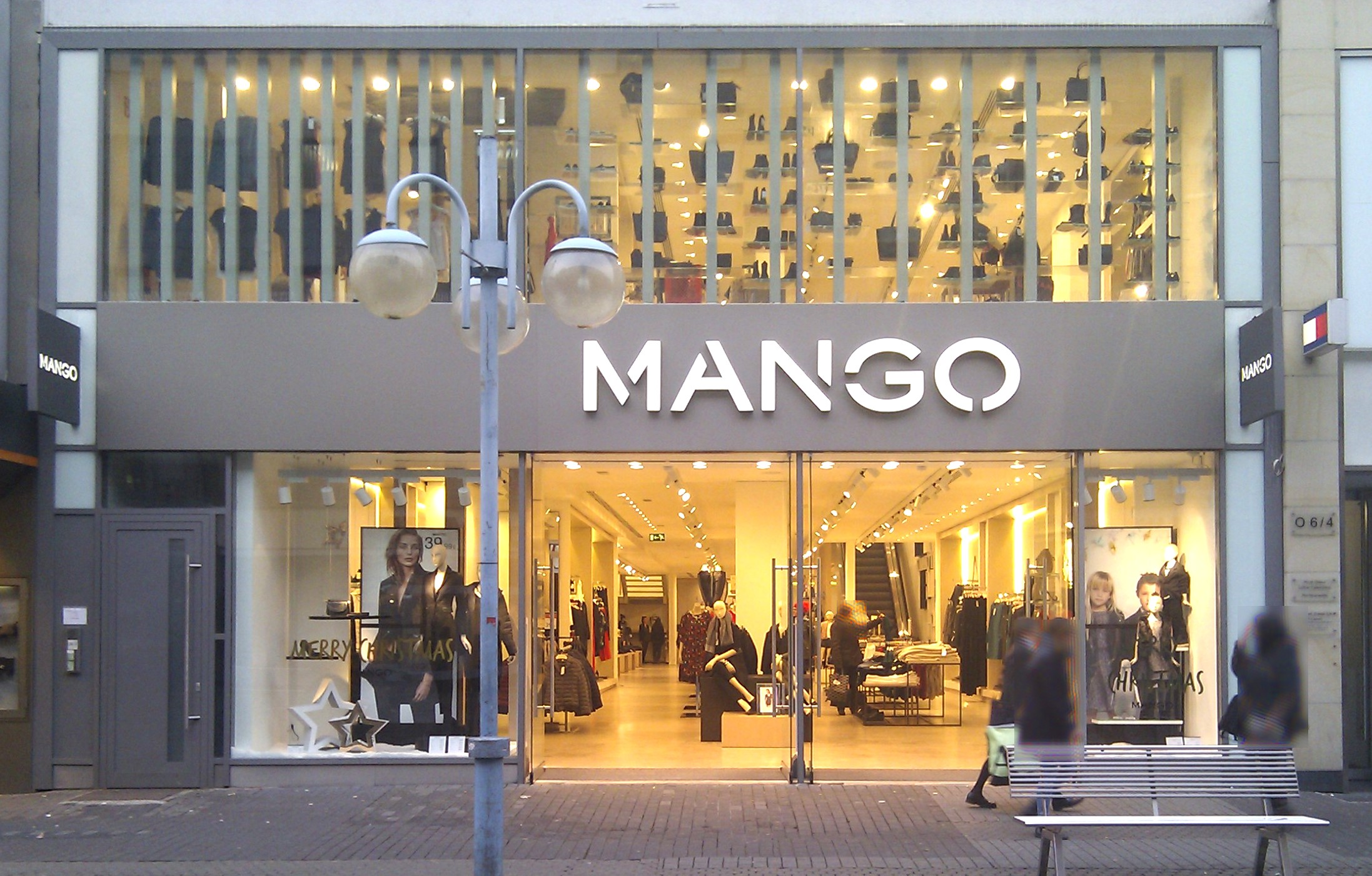
Mango store in Mannheim, Germany (now closed)

In April 2011, Letizia, Princess of Asturias visited company headquarters wearing a Mango outfit.

In 2015, Mango had revenue of Euro 2.327 billion with earnings before interest, taxes, depreciation, and amortization of Euro 170 million.

=== 2020–2024 ===
The company launched its teen line, Mango Teen, via a pop-up shop featuring a TikTok stage for customers in Barcelona at Rambla de Catalunya, 76, in September 2020.

In early-2021, Mango launched a Mediterranean-inspired store concept with higher sustainability standards. Also in 2021, Mango opened four stores in the U.S., precisely, in New Jersey, New York and Miami.

In April 2022, Mango launched its line of home essentials, Mango Home, via its website. Later, in May 2022, it started its expansion plan in the United States with the opening of its flagship store on Fifth Avenue in New York and three openings in Florida. By the end of 2022, Mango had ten stores in the U.S.

In 2023, Mango extended its online sales services to 17 African countries, some of which represent new markets. The same year, Mango strengthens its presence in the Netherlands with the opening of seven new stores.

In 2024, Mango announced the opening of its new store in Reims. The same year, Mango opened an online store on Roblox.

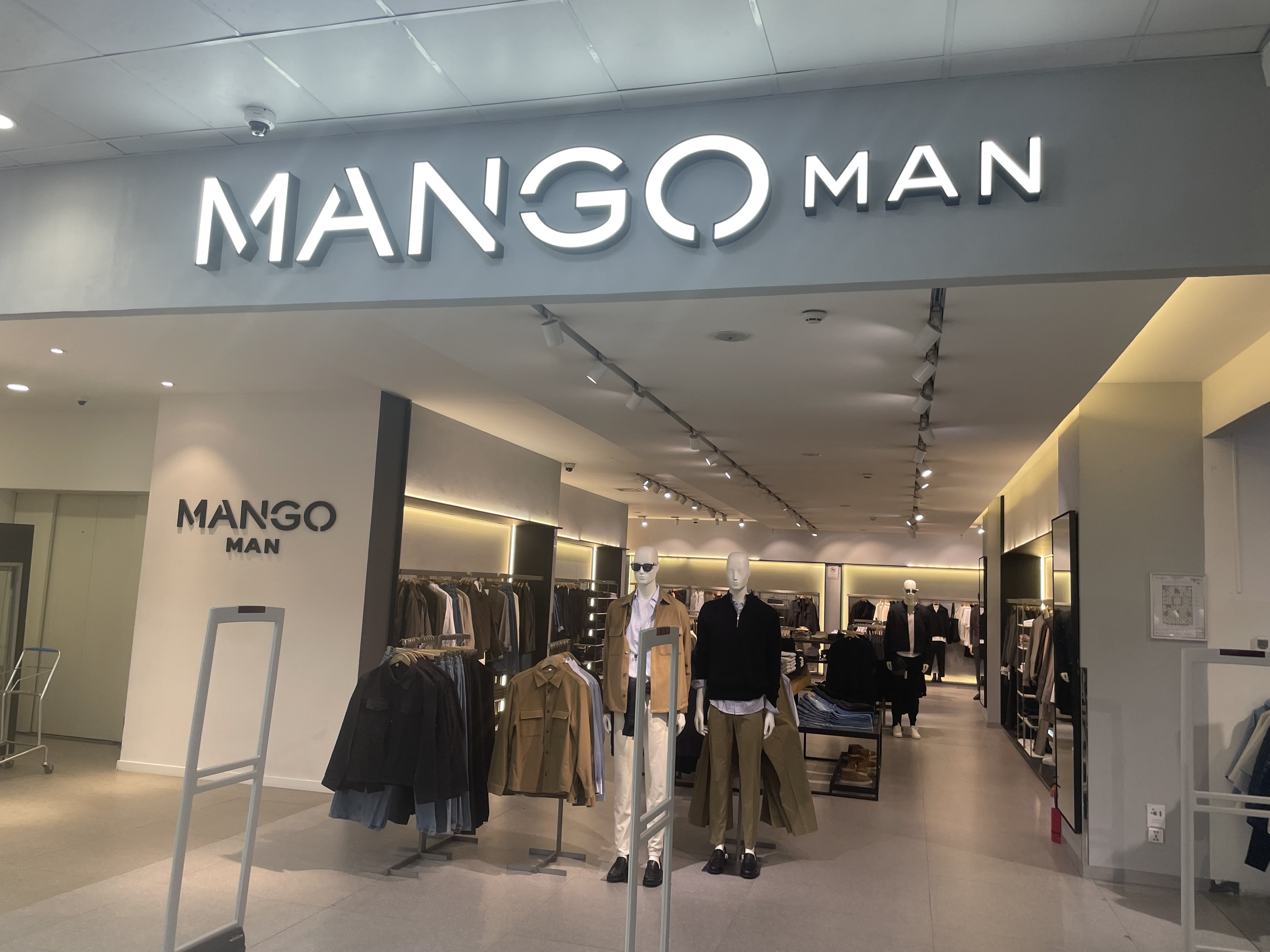
Mango outlet in Ulaanbaatar, Mongolia

By March 2024, Mango had over 14,000 employees working in more than 2,700 stores which operate in over 110 countries.

To mark its 40th anniversary in 2024, Mango recently announced its collaboration with the brand Victoria Beckham in April. It was reported that the Victoria Beckham x Mango collection would be available from April 23, 2024.

In April 2024, Mango invested in shared mobility start-up Hoop Carpool. The same period, Mango announced its expansion in the U.S. with the opening of new stores in Washington, D.C. and Massachusetts. Later, in May, Mango opened its store at Angel Central in London. Mango is also opening a new store in Marseille after the summer of 2024.

Founder and chairman Isak Andic died in Collbató on 14 December 2024, after falling to his death while exploring caves.

Also in 2024, the retailer returned to the Brazilian market after leaving the South American country in 2013.

In 2024, MANGO reported revenue of 3.339 billion euros, 7.6% more than in 2023. At constant exchange rates, revenue increased by 11.6%. EBITDA reached 636 million euros, up 19% on 2023, while net profit stood at 219 million euros, an improvement of 27% on the previous financial year.

=== 2025–2026 ===
In August 2025, fashion brand Mango had launched a pioneering virtual fashion assistant powered by generative AI.

In 2025, the company posted revenues of 3.767 billion euros, up 13% on the previous year. At constant exchange rates, turnover rose by 16%. EBITDA reached €722 million, growing by 13% compared to 2024, while net profit stood at €242 million, an increase of 11%.

On 19 May 2026, Mango Vice Chairman of the Board Jonathan Andic, the son of Isak Andic, was arrested in connection with his father's death. In addition to being Vice Chairman of the Board, Jonathan is one of three heirs to Mango and owner of one-third of the company's stock. He ceased being part of the company's day-to-day operation in June 2025.

In June 2026, fashion brand Mango signed a strategic partnership with Italian department store chain Coin to expand its presence in Italy by opening 22 new stores between September 2026 and the end of 2027. The new store opened at the Nave de Vero Shopping Centre in Marghera, near Venice. This store expanded the brand's presence in the Veneto region to five locations and introduced its Kids clothing line to the area for the first time. Furthermore, the new store created 15 jobs.

In August 2026, Mango reported accelerated growth in the Indian market and announced plans for further retail expansion across the country.

== Controversies ==
=== Bangladesh building collapse ===
On 24 April 2013, the eight-story Rana Plaza commercial building collapsed in Savar, a sub-district near Dhaka, the capital of Bangladesh. At least 1,127 people died and over 2,438 were injured. The factory housed a number of separate garment factories employing around 5,000 people, several shops, and a bank and manufactured apparel for brands including the Benetton Group, Joe Fresh, The Children's Place, Primark, Monsoon, and Dressbarn. Of the 29 brands identified as having sourced products from the Rana Plaza factories, only 9 attended meetings held in November 2013 to agree a proposal on compensation to the victims. Several companies refused to sign including Walmart, Carrefour, Bonmarché, Mango, Auchan and Kik. The agreement was signed by Primark, Loblaw, Bonmarche, and El Corte Inglés.

=== Velvetine handbag lawsuit ===
In 2010, the French division of Mango was sued by Anne-Cécile Couétil, creator of the brand Velvetine, who argued that Mango copied two models of her handbags. Despite an attempt of protection via the INPI and similarities between her products and Mango's, the creator lost the lawsuit. She was ordered to pay €6,000 to Mango. On her blog, Couétil claimed she wanted to lodge an appeal. Several bloggers were surprised by the judicial decision saying it was unfair. The brand Mango reacted on Facebook via its official fan page and answered also on the creator's blog.

=== Reaction to Russian invasion of Ukraine ===
At the beginning of the Russian invasion of Ukraine, Mango tried to preserve its operations in Russia. “Given the responsibility we owe our 800 employees in Russia, as well as our franchisees and partners, we have tried to safeguard our operations in the country until the last moment.” the company said. Mango decided to take several initiatives, as a response to the geopolitical situation. They included: providing support and aid to Ukrainian and Russian employees, offering financial support to employees who stayed in the country, and providing mentoring through local teams to all employees and their family members who have relocated out of the country. Mango declared a temporary cessation of operations in Russia at the beginning of March. The company closed all 55 of its stores, made unavailable its online sales platform in Russia, and ceased the shipment of new merchandise to the region.

Despite temporarily halting its direct operations in Russia, the 65 franchisees that were considered “the key partners” for Mango - and the marketplaces were still allowed to continue their operations and distribute Mango products, provided that they had sufficient stock available. 53 franchise outlets received by the Catalan brand continued operating in Russia and selling the company’s parent product line.

In June 2022 Mango announced that it plans to transfer temporarily closed stores to franchise partners in Russia. In a statement, Mango also confirmed that the employees of company-owned stores, as well as the company's commitments to suppliers in the region, will be taken over by Mango's local partners. In March 2023, Toni Ruiz, the CEO of the company, announced at the presentation of the company's financial results that Mango divested all of its stores in Russia to its local franchisees, which are still operated and received by the Catalan brand. This resulted in a financial loss of 20 million euros for the company.

== Violeta by Mango ==
Violeta by Mango is a brand that announced to launch Mango in 2014, based on a clothing collection that ranges from size 40 to 52. However, it created controversy by considering these sizes "special". Thus, Arantxa Calvera, a citizen from Barcelona, began a collection of signatures with the aim of withdrawing the campaign "due to the wrong message it sends about the thinness of women" as explained by Arantxa in La Opinion. In addition, she asks Mango to take into account the role it has in society to spread a healthy woman model. To respond to this controversy, Violeta Andic, responsible for this line, made the following statements to the newspaper Expansión “Violeta was not born as a large-size brand, but as a brand that makes a different pattern, aimed at women with curves. We wanted to adapt the seams and armholes to our type of woman, and Mango has opted for this line because we believe that it is a market need that is not covered.
