= Daniel Maté =

Spanish billionaire (born 1963/64)

- Born: 1963 or 1964 (age 62–63)
- Education: University of Deusto
- Occupation: metals trader
- Known for: Owner of c. 3%, Glencore
- Spouse: married
- Children: 2

Daniel Francisco Maté Badenes (born 1963/64) is a Spanish billionaire, and the owner of about 3% of Glencore.

Maté has degrees in economics and law, both from the University of Deusto.

Maté is in charge of zinc and lead marketing at Glencore.

Maté is married, with two children, and lives in the canton of Schwyz, Switzerland.
