= Viaducto de Montabliz =

Viaduct of Montabliz Viaducto de Montabliz
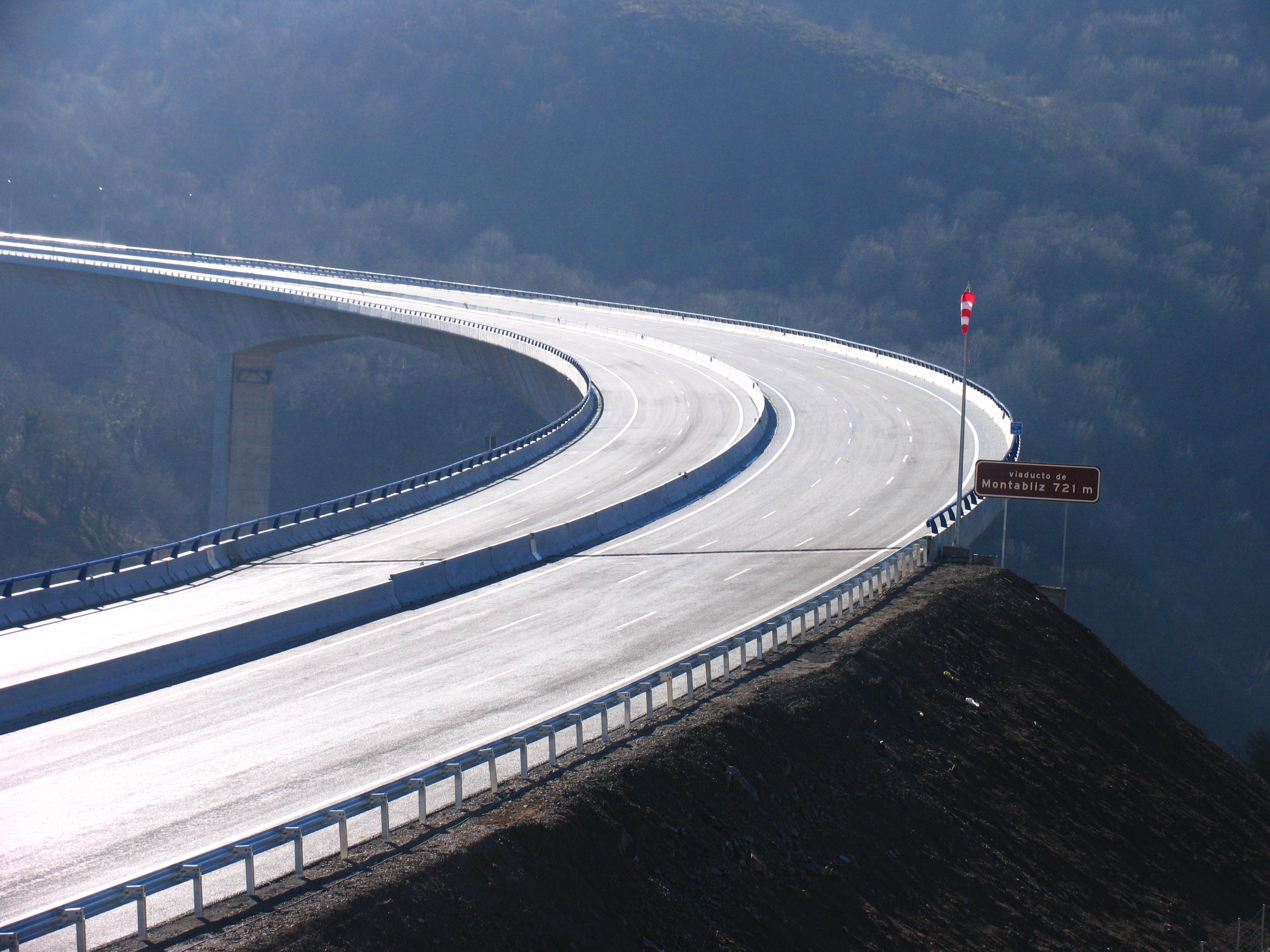
- Coordinates: 43.103739°N 4.089317°W
- Carries: Cantabria-Plateau Highway
- Crosses: Valley of the Bisueña River
- Locale: Cantabria, Spain
- Official name: Viaducto de Montabliz

Characteristics
- Design: Concrete beam and steel
- Total length: 721 m (2,365 ft)
- Width: 26.1 m (86 ft)
- Height: 150 m (490 ft)
- Longest span: 175 m (574 ft)
- No. of spans: 5

History
- Designer: Apia XXI & Ferrovial
- Opened: January 31, 2008

Statistics
- Daily traffic: 11,500 vehicles/day

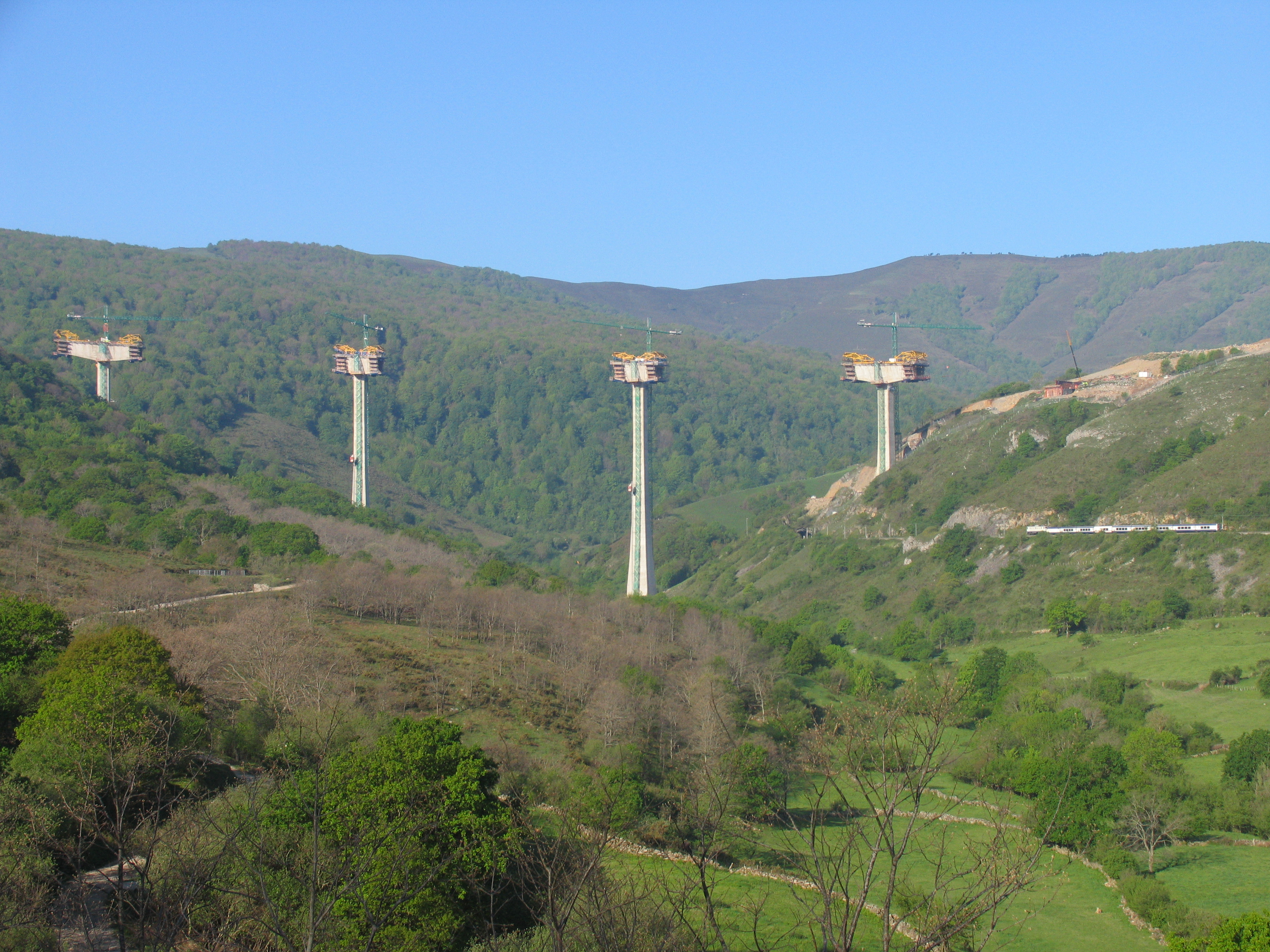
Viaducto de Montabliz under construction.

The Viaducto de Montabliz (Viaduct of Montabliz) is a bridge located in the town of Montabliz, Cantabria, Spain.

It is known for being the highest bridge in Spain and the sixth in Europe, with 150 meters (490 ft) in height (highest part) over the river Bisueña. It was built by Ferrovial and was completed in 2008. It carries the A-67 autovía.

== See also ==
- List of highest bridges in the world
