= Prosegur =

Multinational security company

Prosegur Compañía de Seguridad, S.A
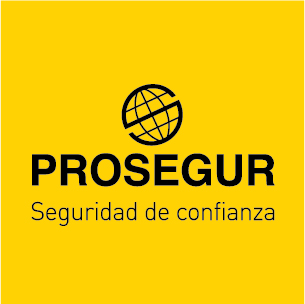
- Type: Sociedad Anónima
- Traded as: BMAD: PSG
- Industry: Security
- Founded: 1976; 50 years ago
- Headquarters: Madrid, Spain
- Area served: Worldwide
- Key people: Helena Revoredo (Chairman); Christian Gut (CEO)
- Services: Manned guarding, cash in transit, security technology, security consulting, residential security
- Revenue: € 4,291 million (2017)
- Net income: € 220 million (2017)
- Number of employees: More than 170,000 (2017)
- Website: www.prosegur.com

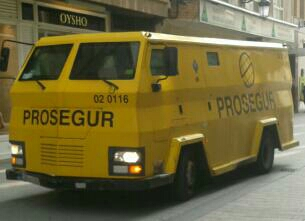
Prosegur armoured van

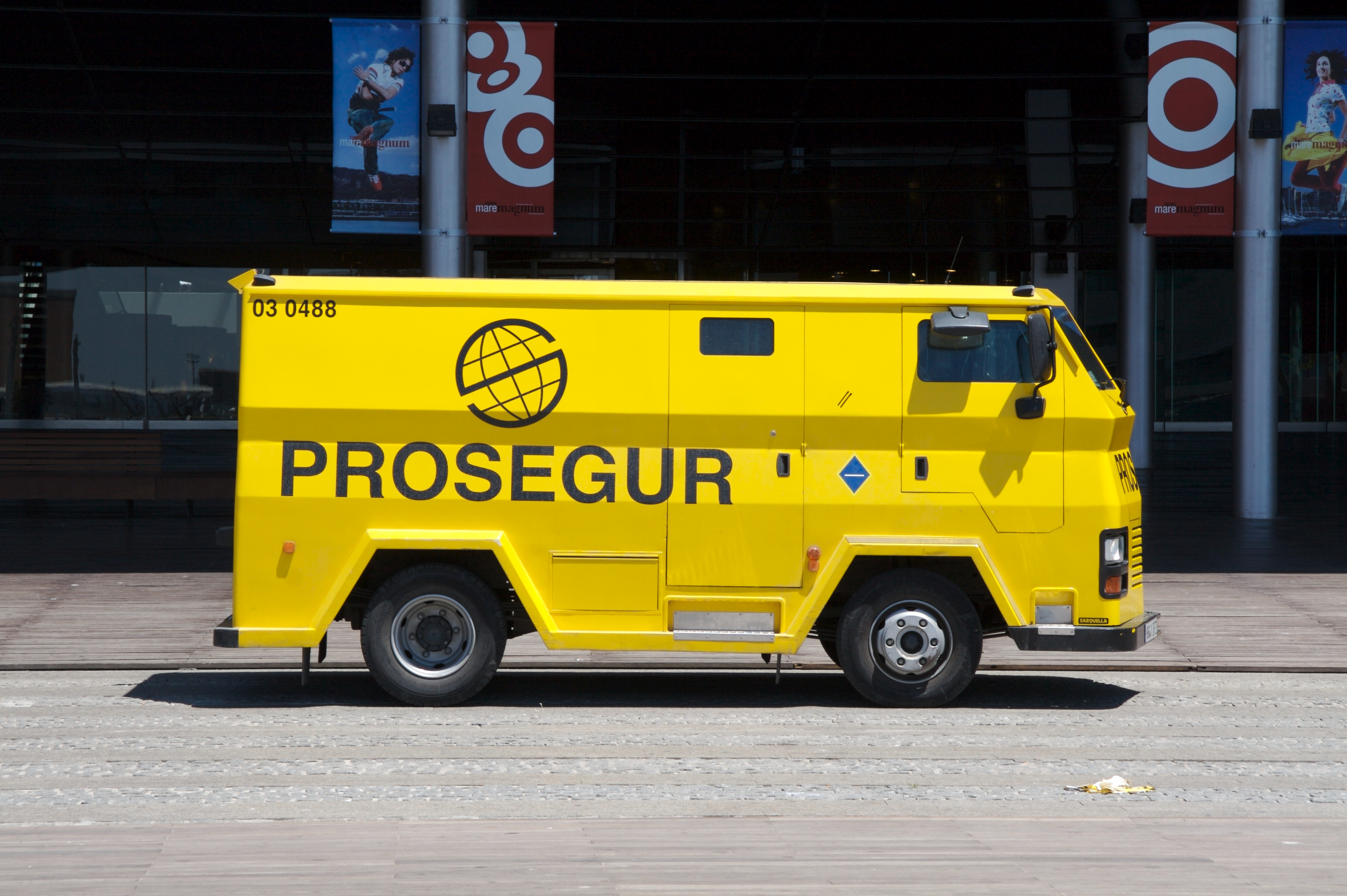
Prosegur armoured van (profile)

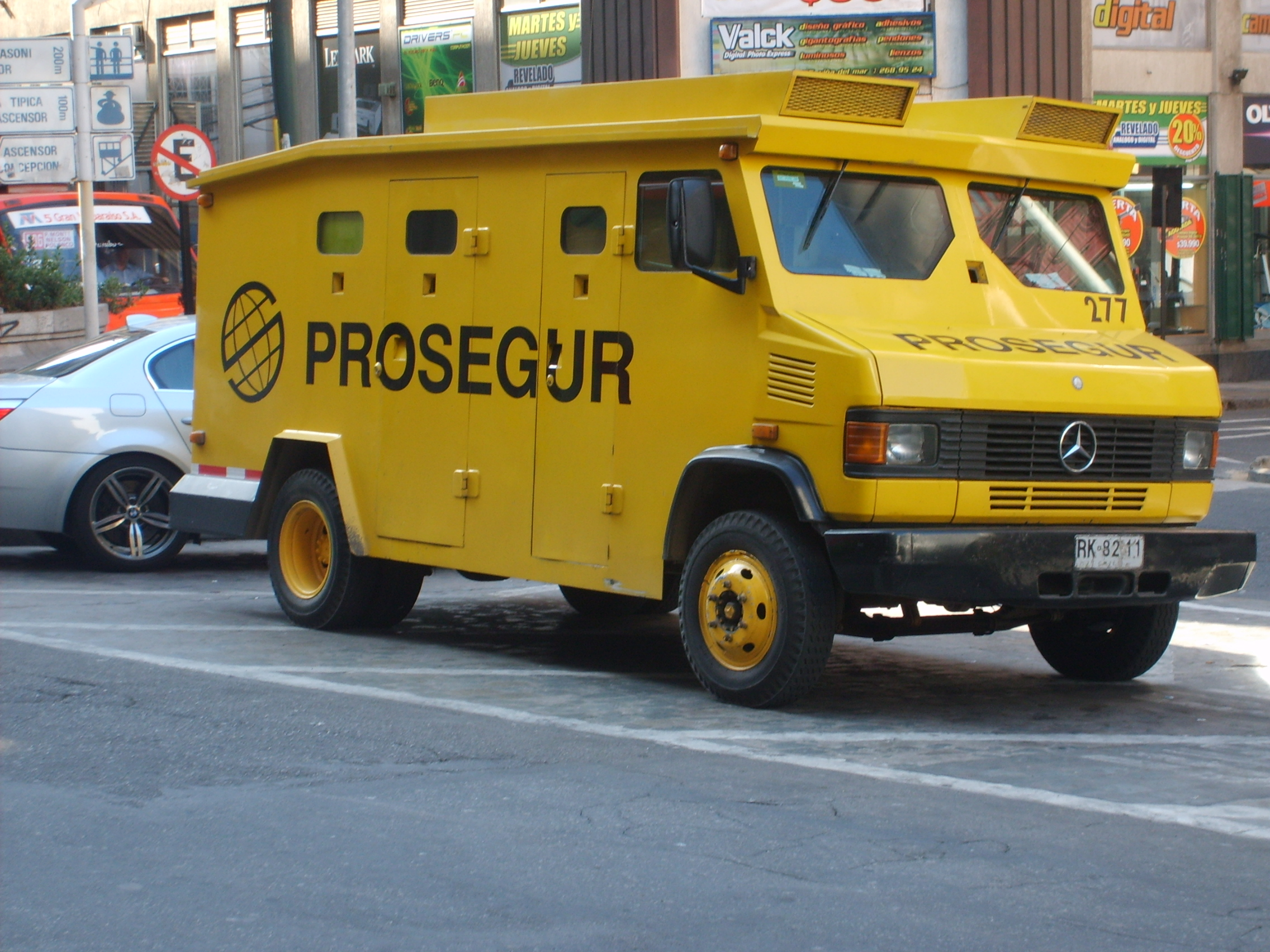
Mercedes truck based Prosegur van

Prosegur Compañía de Seguridad, S.A ("Prosegur") is a multinational security company, headquartered in Madrid, Spain.

== History ==
Prosegur was founded in 1976 by Herberto Gut. It began as a private security company, with a particular focus on power plants, industrial facilities, and shopping centres. In 1987, it became the first security company to list on the Madrid Stock Exchange, and remains the largest company in the private security industry in Spain.

In March 2017, Prosegur demerged its cash business, which listed separately on the Madrid Stock Exchange, Prosegur Cash remains majority owned by Prosegur.

== Global presence ==
Prosegur operates in 31 countries across four continents. Prosegur's entry into new markets and subsequent expansion has often been through acquisition. Its operations grew initially through Spain, Portugal, and Latin America, but have since expanded to other parts of Europe and Asia. Prosegur holds a market-leading position in many of the countries in which it operates, including Spain, Brazil, and Germany.

In December 2013, Prosegur entered the Australian market with the acquisition of the second largest cash in transit business in the country, the Australian division of Chubb Security for A$145 million (€95 million). In July 2022, Prosegur and Armaguard agreed terms to merge their Australian operations. The merger was approved by regulators in June 2023.

== Social responsibility ==
Prosegur actively promotes socially responsible practices. Examples include:

- It has been awarded the "Top Employer" award in Spain and Brazil by the Top Employers Institute in 2013
- It is a signatory of the UN Global Compact
- It has established the Prosegur Foundation, with a focus on education and social and employment integration for disabled people and corporate volunteer work
- It is a member of the FTSE4Good IBEX index

=== Prosegur Foundation ===
The Prosegur Foundation is a non-profit organization that channels Prosegur's social and cultural initiatives, with the aim of helping to build a more supportive society with less inequality. This organization carries out social projects that address the real needs of the communities where the company operates, promote the education of new generations, and foster the social and professional inclusion of people with intellectual disabilities.
