= Helena Revoredo =

Spanish (born 1947)

- Born: 1947 (age 78–79); Rosario, Argentina
- Education: Pontifical Catholic University of Argentina; IESE Business School
- Title: Chairman, Prosegur
- Term: 2004-
- Board member of: Banco Popular Español
- Spouse: Herberto Gut (d. 1997)
- Children: 4

Helena Revoredo Delvecchio (born 1947) is an Argentine-Spanish billionaire, and the chairman of Prosegur since 2004. She controls half of Prosegur's shares through her holding Gubel SL.

As of April 2022, Forbes estimated her fortune to be worth $1.2 billion.

== Early life ==
Helena Revoredo was born in Rosario, Argentina. She is the daughter of the businessman Juan Federico Revoredo. She has a bachelor's degree from the Pontifical Catholic University of Argentina, and an MBA from IESE Business School.

== Career ==
Revoredo's late husband, Herberto Gut, founded Prosegur in 1976, but died in a car accident on 31 May 1997 with her Mercedes.

Revoredo was a director of Banco Popular Español, which was Spain's sixth-largest lender. She is member of IESE's International Advisory Board (IAB). In 2013, she held a 0.3% stake in Banco Popular. From November 2014 to January 2020, she was sitting on the board of Endesa (the first woman to sit on the board of the company). In September 2019, Telefonica bought Prosegur's security alarm subsidiary for $300 million, partly with shares of Telefónica, making Revoredo a new shareholder in Telefónica. In January 2020, her shares in Prosegur's controlling holding Gubel dropped below 50%, but she retained a majority on the voting rights.

== Personal life ==
Revoredo married Herberto Gut and the couple moved to Spain in 1975 where her husband was in charge of setting up the Spanish subsidiary of his boss' security company, thus giving birth to Prosegur. Their son, Christian Gut, is CEO of Prosegur, and her daughter Chantal Gut sits on the board.
