= Ferrovial =

Spanish multinational company

Ferrovial S.E.
- Type: Public
- Traded as: BMAD: FER; IBEX 35 component; Nasdaq: FER; Nasdaq-100 component; Euronext Amsterdam: FER
- ISIN: ES0118900010
- Industry: Transportation
- Founded: 1952; 74 years ago
- Founder: Rafael del Pino
- Headquarters: Amsterdam, Netherlands
- Area served: Spain, Portugal, United Kingdom, Ireland, Poland, United States, Canada, Chile, Australia
- Key people: Rafael del Pino Calvo-Sotelo (chairman); Óscar Fanjul (vice chairman); Ignacio Madridejos (CEO)
- Services: Residential, commercial property and infrastructure construction; toll road operation; airport and infrastructure management; waste management; facility management
- Revenue: ▲€9.63 billion (2025)
- Operating income: ▼€1.18 billion (2025)
- Net income: ▼€888 million (2025)
- Total assets: ▼€27.4 billion (2025)
- Total equity: ▼€5.91 billion (2025)
- Number of employees: 22,609 (2025)
- Divisions: Airports; Construction; Highways; Services
- Subsidiaries: Webber, Budimex, FerroNATS, Ditecpesa, Cintra US, Inacua, FBSerwus, Ferrovial Serviços, Zity, Ferrovial Servicios Chile, Cadagua, Tecpresa, Edytesa, Autema, Vialivre, B2in, BFK
- Website: ferrovial.com

Ferrovial S.E. (Spanish pronunciation: [feroˈβjal]), previously Grupo Ferrovial, is a Spanish multinational company that operates in the infrastructure sector for transportation and mobility with four divisions: Highways, Airports, Construction, and Mobility and Energy Infrastructure. The Highway sector develops, finances, and operates tolls on highways such as the 407 ETR, the North Tarrant Express, the LBJ Express, Euroscut Azores, I-66, I-77, NTE35W, and Ausol I. The Construction business designs and builds public and private works such as roads, highways, airports, and buildings. The Mobility and Energy Infrastructure Department is responsible for managing renewable energy, sustainable mobility, and circular-economy projects. Ferrovial is present in more than 20 countries where its business lines operate.

In 2021, Ferrovial Services' infrastructure services area in Spain was sold to Portobello, and its Environmental business in Spain and Portugal was sold to PreZero (part of Schwarz Group).

== History ==
=== 20th century ===
Ferrovial was founded by Rafael del Pino y Moreno in 1952 as a company focused on railway construction. Its first works consisted of the renovation of tracks for Renfe and operating railroad tie sleeper workshops. The company received its first international project, a railway project in Venezuela, in 1954. Two years later, it renovated the railway between Bilbao and Portugalete.

In the 1960s, Ferrovial focused on the road market through the Redia Plan11 and the concession of the Bilbao-Behobia Highway, the first toll road tendered with private financing and management in Spain. During 1974, the company obtained its second concession in Spain, the Burgos-Armiñón highway, which linked Burgos with Bilbao and the French border of Behobia. In the late 1970s, it began building 700 kilometers of roads in Libya, with completion in 1986.

In 1985, Ferrovial acquired Cadagua, an engineering and construction company for water treatment plants established in 1971. It began building the High-Speed Train between Madrid and Seville, as well as numerous infrastructure projects for the 1992 Olympic Games in Barcelona and the World Expo of Seville in 1992. In the same year, Rafael del Pino Calvo-Sotelo started as CEO, and he began to reorganize the company.

In 1995, Ferrovial purchased the construction company Agroman founded in 1927, which it returned to profitability three years later. In 1997, construction began on the Guggenheim Museum of Modern and Contemporary Art in Bilbao.

During 1999, Ferrovial went public, and integrated all its construction activity into Ferrovial Agroman. Following the founder's retirement in 2000, his son, Rafael del Pino Calvo-Sotelo, became chair. That same year, Ferrovial took over Budimex, then the leading Polish construction company in terms of turnover and market capitalization.

That same year, the company expanded via the acquisition of 58.5% of Polish construction company Budimex Dromex S.A. It also received the Ontario Highway 407 407 ETR concession in Toronto, Canada.

=== 21st century ===
By following the internationalization and diversification strategy, Ferrovial acquired a 20% share in the Sydney Airport in the airport sector in 2002. One years later, it also acquired two urban services companies, the British company Amey and Spanish company Cespa. The concessionaire Cintra went public in 2004, and in 2005, Ferrovial acquired the handling company Swissport and the Texan construction company Webber.

In 2006, the company bought the British airport operator BAA and through this operation, it came to manage seven airports in the United Kingdom: Heathrow, Gatwick, Stansted, Glasgow, Edinburgh, Aberdeen, and Southampton, and it took ownership of shares and managing the Budapest Airport in Hungary, the Naples Airport in Italy, and Melbourne Airport in Australia. In 2006, Cintra also obtained the concession for operating the Indiana Toll Road turnpike. and signed an agreement with the Texas Department of Transportation to build and manage Segments 5 and 6 of the SH-130 Turnpike.

In 2007, Ferrovial sold the Budapest airport, as well as its holdings in the Australian airports in Sydney, Melbourne, Launceston, Perth and three airports in the Northern Territory. It also started to concentrate its airport business in the UK. That year, Cintra signed a contract for the construction and operation of the Central Greece Toll Highway (E65), and Amey was chosen by Network Rail (the UK's railway infrastructure manager) as one of three providers for Britain's National Rail track renovation services.

During 2008, the Montabliz viaduct, the highest one in Spain, was inaugurated and connected Cantabria and the Inner Plateau by road. A year later, Cintra was awarded the construction, maintenance, and operation of the North Tarrant Express Highway in Texas in the US. At the end of 2009, the company absorbed the highway management company Cintra; it was awarded maintenance and management of the LBJ Express Texan highway; it changed its corporate name to Ferrovial S.A.; and it sold the Gatwick airport for €1.659 billion, according to the British Competition Commission's indications, which opened a file at the end of 2008 for alleged monopoly.

In 2009, the company changed its logo. In 2010, Ferrovial sold Swissport. Through BAA, it sold its stake in Airport Property Partnership and the Naples Airport. Likewise, Ferrovial, sold all its shares in Tube Lines (concessionaire of three London Underground lines) to Transport for London through Amey; signed an agreement for the construction of Heathrow Terminal 2 in London; and sold 60% of Cintra Chile.

A year later in 2011, it sold 5.88% of BAA. In addition, it announced the sale of the Edinburgh Airport, per the decision of the British Competition Commission. In that same year, the company was also awarded a new construction section of the Crossrail including Farringdon Station, as part of the project to build a fast railway connection passing through the city of London's underground. It had previously been awarded the construction of two tunnels between Royal Oak and Farringdon and the accesses and bays at the Bond Street and Tottenham Court Road stations. The company closed 2011 with a debt of €5.171 billion, one of the lowest in the sector, and it has one of the most international portfolios. In August 2012, Ferrovial announced the sale of 10.6% of BAA to Qatar Holding for €607 million, retaining a 39.37% stake in the UK airports manager following the deal. In October of the same year, it sold 5.2% of Heathrow Airports Holding for €319.3 million to CIC International.

In 2014, the international trading company Ferrovial International was created. It was based in Spain and aimed to combine the company's active concessions, services, and construction abroad. That same year, the company reduced its stake in Heathrow Airport by up to 25% after selling the pension fund for universities and other British educational institutions; this was 8.65% of its shares in the parent company. With a contract to build an urban road in Saudi Arabia for €145 million, Ferrovial strengthened its presence in the Middle East.

In 2015, it purchased 3 British airports (Aberdeen, Glasgow, and Southampton), for about €1.3 billion. In addition, the central section of the Thames Tideway Tunnel was awarded in consortium with Laing O'Rourke. In 2016, Ferrovial expanded the 407 ETR in Toronto, Canada. In addition, it signed a contract to manage and renovate the largest and fifth-busiest airport in the United States: Denver International Airport. It purchased the waste treatment company Biotran. That same year, and for the fifteenth consecutive year, it appeared on the Dow Jones Sustainability Index (DJSI). In May 2016, Ferrovial acquired Broadspectrum. On 30 June 2018, it completed the sale of this company to Ventia. The company earned €376 million in 2016. Sales increased by 11% to €10.759 billion, and the Gross Operating Income (GOI) was €944 million.

At the end of the decade, in 2017, Ferrovial entered the urban mobility business by working with Renault to launch the carsharing operator Zity in Madrid. In 2018, the company launched Wondo, a Mobility as a Service start-up to provide residents access to the main urban mobility services in Madrid. In 2021, it sold Wondo to the Finnish company MaaS Global. In the town of El Salado, Colombia, the company built a water system as part of the Social Infrastructures program: a solar-powered aqueduct. Ignacio Madridejos was appointed as the new CEO of the company in 2019. Broadspectrum was sold to Ventia for €303 million. The RiverLinx consortium, which Ferrovial participates in, was chosen to manage the Silvertown Tunnel in London.

In October 2021, Ferrovial launched its new Energy Infrastructure and Mobility business unit. It sold its Environmental business in Spain and Portugal to PreZero. The company began construction of a section of the Sydney Metro for €1.240 billion. Ferrovial launched the AIVIA initiative for developing the 5G roads of the future; it renewed its agreement with MIT for another five years and with Lilium for developing a network of more than 10 vertiports (vertical takeoff urban airports) in the United States. In July 2022, the company was fined €38.5 million, along with five other contractors, by the Comisión Nacional de los Mercados y la Competencia (CNMC) for bidding collusion in public tenders for building and civil infrastructure works. In April 2023, the company announced that it was moving its headquarters from Madrid to Amsterdam.

In November 2023, the company announced the sale of its 25% stake in Heathrow Airport for £2.37 billion. The equity is intended to be sold to Ardian, which would acquire 15%, and Saudi Arabia's Public Investment Fund, which would acquire the remaining 10%. It was reported that Ferrovial expects to complete the sale by mid-2024, which is subject to regulatory conditions. On 15 December 2024, it was reported that Ardian and PIF have successfully acquired 22.6% and 15% respectively of stakes in Heathrow Airport for a combined US$4.12 billion from Ferrovial and some shareholders in FGP TopCo.

== Business lines ==
Ferrovial operates through four divisions.

=== Highways ===
Through its subsidiary Cintra, Ferrovial manages more than 22 highways with over 1,262 kilometers. In Spain, it operates the Autema highway concession, A66, and the Autopista del Sol (E15), as well as the SerranoPark car park in Madrid. In Portugal, it owns a share in the Scut Açores highway. In Canada and the United States, it operates highways under a barrier-free toll system, including the 407 ETR, the 407 East Phase 2, and the 407 EDG highways (Toronto), the LBJ Expressway, the North Tarrant Express and NTE Extension (Dallas), and I-77 (North Carolina). In European countries, Ferrovial has a share in the M3 and M4 highways in Ireland, and it is overseeing the M8 improvement project in Scotland.

In 2015, the group increased its profit by 80% to €720 million, following the sale and deconsolidation of highways.

=== Airports ===
Ferrovial's first foray into private airport management was with the purchase of a share in the Mexican company Aeropuertos del Sureste in 1998. Since then, Ferrovial has managed different airports around the world.

With the acquisition of BAA in 2006, now called Heathrow Airport Holdings (HAH), it went on to manage seven airports in the United Kingdom: Heathrow, Gatwick, Stansted, Southampton, Aberdeen, Glasgow and Edinburgh. It also acquired two airports in Europe in Naples and Budapest, which it would later sell. Following a British Competition Commission's ruling, Ferrovial sold Gatwick Airport in 2009, announced the sale of Edinburgh Airport in April 2012, and put the Stansted Airport up for sale in August of the same year.

Ferrovial currently operates four airports in the United Kingdom: Heathrow, Southampton, Glasgow, and Aberdeen.

At the beginning of 2021, Ferrovial Airports announced its foray into the urban air mobility (UAM) and advanced air mobility (AAM) business through the construction and design of vertiports, the infrastructures needed by eVTOLs. Currently, Ferrovial has announced its plans for the development of vertiport networks in Spain, the United Kingdom, and the United States.

In 2022, Ferrovial Airports reached an agreement with the Turkish infrastructure company YDA Group for the acquisition of a 60% stake in the company that manages the concession of Dalaman International Airport in Turkey.

=== Construction ===
The company's construction division, which was called Ferrovial Agroman until 2020, is now Ferrovial Construction, and has been involved in the following major projects:

- the Guggenheim Museum Bilbao in Spain completed in 1997
- Terminal 4 at Madrid–Barajas Airport in Spain, completed in 2006
- Marqués de Riscal Hotel in Spain, completed in 2006
- CaixaForum Madrid in Spain, completed in 2007
- Viaducto de Montabliz in Spain, completed in 2008
- M3 motorway in Ireland, completed in 2010
- Málaga Airport Terminal 3 in Spain, completed in 2010
- SCUT Azores Highway in the Azores, completed in 2011
- Heathrow T2A Terminal in England, completed in 2014
- Farringdon station in the United Kingdom, completed in 2018

==== Construction subsidiaries ====
- Webber in the USA
- Budimex in Poland
- Cadagua

=== Mobility and Energy Infrastructure ===
Ferrovial Mobility and Energy Infrastructures promote the transition to a sustainable and clean economy and are involved in projects such as offshore wind farms.

== Services ==
In 2021, Ferrovial Services' infrastructure services area in Spain was sold to Portobello, and it came to an agreement with PreZero, a Schwarz Group company, on closing the sale of its Environmental business in Spain and Portugal. This division was in charge of the maintenance and conservation of infrastructures and services, as well as managing urban and environmental services. It has the following international subsidiaries:

- Broadspectrum in Australia and New Zealand was acquired in May 2016; it is dedicated to services in the area of transportation, urban infrastructure, natural resources, and provisions for public administrations.
- Amey in the United Kingdom engaged in infrastructure maintenance and facility and waste management. The British subsidiary will manage 370 kilometers of highways in the United Kingdom.
- Steel Ferrovial Services provides mining services in Chile.

== Sustainability ==
Ferrovial has been cited for sustainability.

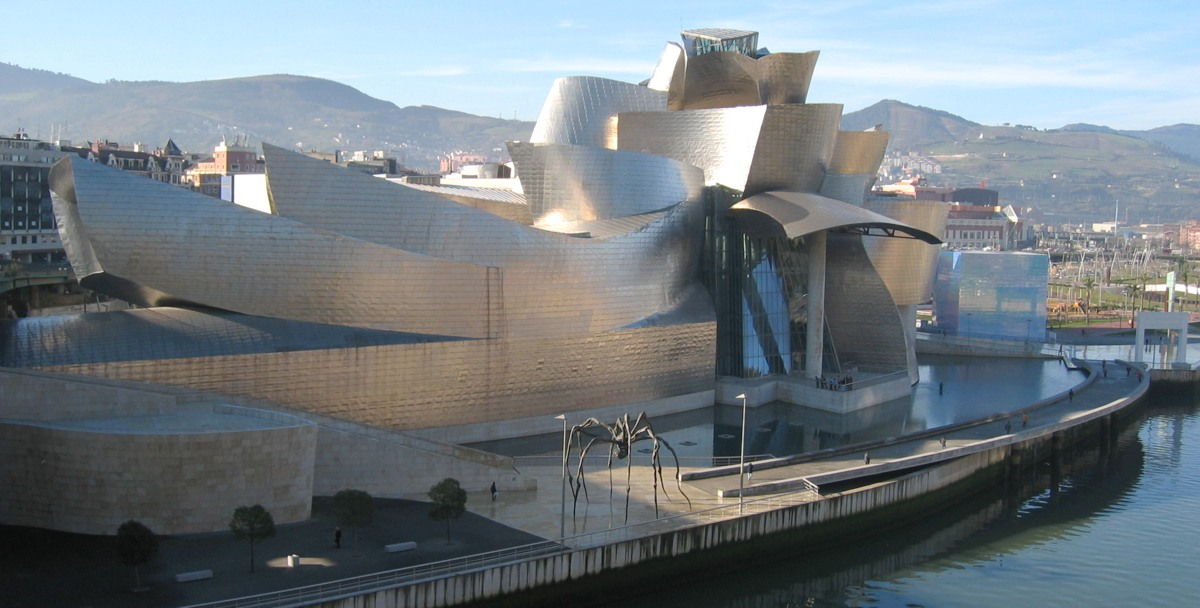
Guggenheim museum, Bilbao.

- GRESB: The company is a participant member of the GLIO/GRESB ESG Index.

== Criticism ==
=== The Palau Case ===
As part of the Palau Case investigation, Anti-Corruption discovered "sufficient evidence" of Ferrovial Agroman paying illicit commissions to the Democratic Convergence of Catalonia (CDC) party through the Palau de la Música Catalana to ensure that public works such as the City of Justice and the unfinished line 9 of the Barcelona Metro station would be awarded to them.

On 15 January 2018, the Provincial Court of Barcelona issued a judgment in the Palau Case, acquitting the two executives related to Ferrovial Agroman. The prosecution appealed that acquittal, but the appeal was dismissed by the Supreme Court.
