= Rafael del Pino (businessman) =

Spanish businessman

- Born: Rafael del Pino Moreno; November 10, 1920; Madrid, Spain
- Died: 14 June 2008 (aged 87); Madrid, Spain
- Resting place: Santo Ángel de la Guarda cemetery, Pozuelo de Alarcón, Spain; 40.428101°N 3.814979°W
- Education: Colegio Santa María del Pilar, Escuela Técnica Superior de Ingenieros de Caminos, Canales y Puertos (Universidad Politécnica de Madrid)
- Occupation: Civil Engineer
- Known for: Founder of Ferrovial
- Spouse: Ana María Calvo-Sotelo
- Children: Rafael del Pino Calvo-Sotelo; Maria del Pino y Calvo-Sotelo
- Awards: Great Cross of the Order of Civil Merit

Rafael del Pino y Moreno (10 November 1920 – 14 June 2008) was one of the wealthiest men in Europe. He had a net worth of approximately 8.6 billion US dollars in 2007. Del Pino founded the construction company Ferrovial in 1952, which became one of Spain's largest builders. He stepped down as President of Ferrovial in 2000, passing on the position to his son, Rafael del Pino Calvo-Sotelo, who now heads the business. He held an MBA from the MIT Sloan School of Management. In 2000 he founded the Fundación Rafael del Pino with the mission of developing future leaders. He was also member of IESE's International Advisory Board (IAB).

== See also ==
- List of billionaires (2007)
