= Mercadona =

Spanish supermarket chain

Mercadona, S.A.

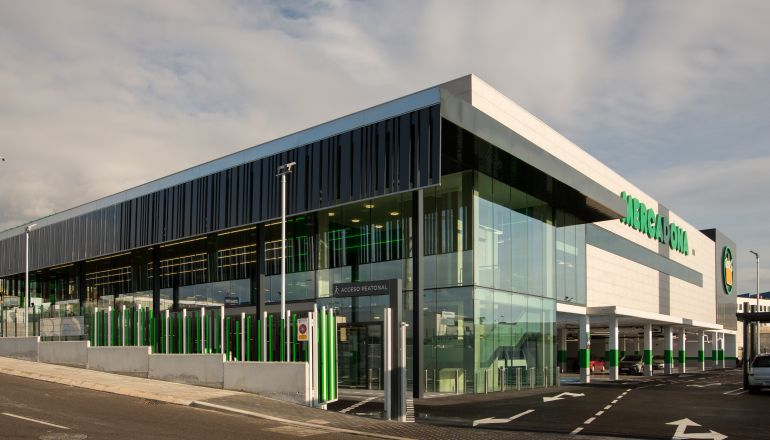
- Type: Private (Sociedad Anónima)
- Industry: Retail
- Founded: 1977
- Founder: Francisco Roig Ballester
- Headquarters: Tavernes Blanques, Valencian Community, Spain
- Number of locations: 1,672 stores (4 October 2024)
- Area served: Spain, Portugal
- Key people: Juan Roig (Chairman & CEO)
- Products: Groceries
- Revenue: €35.605 billion (US$39 billion) (2024)
- Total assets: 8,194,637,000 ±1000 (2016)
- Owner: Juan Roig (50%); Hortensia Herrero (30%); Fernando Roig (9%); Rafael Gómez Gómez and family (7%)
- Number of employees: 110,000 (2024)
- Website: www.mercadona.com

Mercadona (Note: Pronunciation of Mercadona: Valencian: [meɾkaˈðɔna], also [meɾkaˈðɔnɔ] Catalan: [məɾkəˈðɔnə] Spanish: [meɾkaˈðona] Portuguese: [mɨɾkɐˈðɔnɐ] Galician: [meɾkaˈðonɐ] Basque: [meɾkaˈðona]) is a Spanish supermarket chain operating 1,637 stores in Spain and 39 in Portugal as of January 2026.

It has 1,676 supermarkets, of which 1,637 are in Spain (with a presence in all 52 provinces, as well as Ceuta and Melilla) and 39 in Portugal.

== History ==
The company was founded in 1977 by Francisco Roig Ballester and Trinidad Alfonso Mocholí in Tavernes Blanques, Valencian Community. Initially operating as a butcher's shop, it expanded into grocery retail and developed into one of Spain's largest supermarket chains.

According to one of the couple's sons, Juan, the name Mercadona was chosen to emulate that of an Italian pasta brand, Mercadonna, but with a slight modification; however, other sources indicate that it comes from the Valencian phrase mercat de dona ("women's market").

In 1981, Juan Roig bought his parents' company, which at that time had eight grocery stores in Valencia, with the support of his wife and his siblings Francisco, Amparo, and Trinidad. In 1981, Juan Roig became CEO, initiating a period of nationwide expansion. In the 1990s, the company redesigned store formats, updated branding, and adopted operational changes to compete with rivals such as Carrefour and Eroski.

== Recent developments ==
Mercadona has pursued significant international expansion in recent years, particularly in Portugal. By 2025, the company had invested over €1 billion in Portuguese operations, opening 63 stores and planning to reach 70 by the end of the year. This includes entry into the Lisbon market, with planned openings in Alta de Lisboa and Quinta do Lambert.

In June 2025, Mercadona inaugurated its largest logistics centre to date in Almeirim, Portugal, covering 120,000 m² and employing 630 people, with an investment of €290 million.

The company has also introduced price reductions on selected staple products, such as certain Hacendado coffee varieties, as part of a long-term affordability strategy.

Mercadona has a total workforce of 99,000 employees (95,500 in Spain and 3,500 in Portugal) and is the supermarket chain with the largest market share in the distribution sector in Spain: 25.8%.

== Controversies ==
In June 2025, Mercadona was fined €2.6 million by Spanish data protection authorities for using facial recognition technology in stores without adequate legal basis, raising privacy concerns.

Labour unions have also reported cases of workplace harassment. In June 2025, the Galician CIG union filed a complaint alleging verbal abuse, isolation, and undue pressure on employees at the Porto do Molle store in Nigrán, Spain.

In another widely reported incident, an employee in Spain was dismissed for eating store products (croissants and cookies) without payment. The dismissal was upheld by the courts as proportionate and supported by security footage.
