= Fernando Roig =

Spanish businessperson

- Born: 25 June 1947 (age 79); Valencia, Spain
- Occupations: Major shareholder of Mercadona; Owner and president of Villarreal
- Spouse: Elena Negueroles
- Children: 2
- Relatives: Juan Roig (brother); Hortensia Herrero (sister-in-law)

Fernando Roig Alfonso (born 25 June 1947) is a Spanish billionaire businessman, the owner and president of the Spanish football club Villarreal, owner and president of Spanish ceramic company Pamesa and owner of 9% of the Spanish supermarket chain Mercadona. As of October 2021, Forbes estimated his net worth at US$1.7 billion.

His brother Juan Roig, is the CEO and majority shareholder, his wife Hortensia Herrero owns 28% of Mercadona.

Roig is married, with two children, and lives in Valencia, Spain.
