= Rafael del Pino Calvo-Sotelo =

Spanish businessman (born 1958)

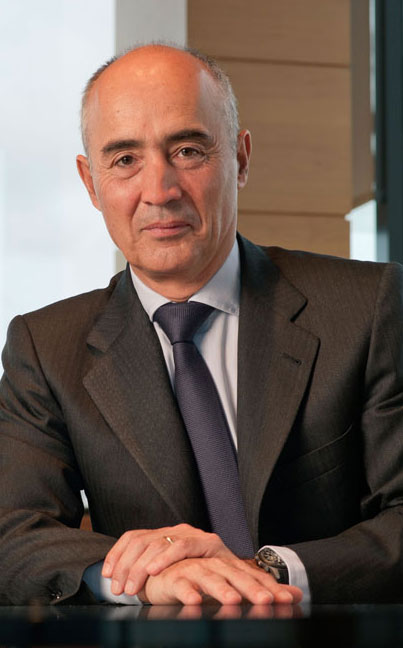
- Born: 4 July 1958 (age 68); Madrid, Spain
- Education: MIT Sloan School of Management
- Occupation: Executive president of Ferrovial
- Parent: Rafael del Pino y Moreno
- Relatives: Maria del Pino y Calvo-Sotelo (sister)

Rafael del Pino Calvo-Sotelo (born 1958) is a Spanish billionaire businessman, the executive chairman of Ferrovial, the company founded in 1952 by his father Rafael del Pino Moreno.

He graduated as a civil engineer from the Polytechnic University of Madrid (1981). Like his father, he also holds an MBA degree from the MIT Sloan School of Management (1986). He was the chief executive officer (CEO) of Grupo Ferrovial from 1992 to 1999.

Rafael del Pino is a member of the MIT Corporation, the MIT Energy Initiative's External Advisory Board and MIT Sloan's European Advisory Board. In addition he is a member of the International Advisory Board of IESE and of the Harvard Business School European Advisory Board.

He is the nephew of former Spanish PM Leopoldo Calvo-Sotelo.

In May 2022, he was awarded as Honorary Commander of the Order of the British Empire (CBE), for services to the UK transport and infrastructure sectors.
