= Collbató =

- Municipality
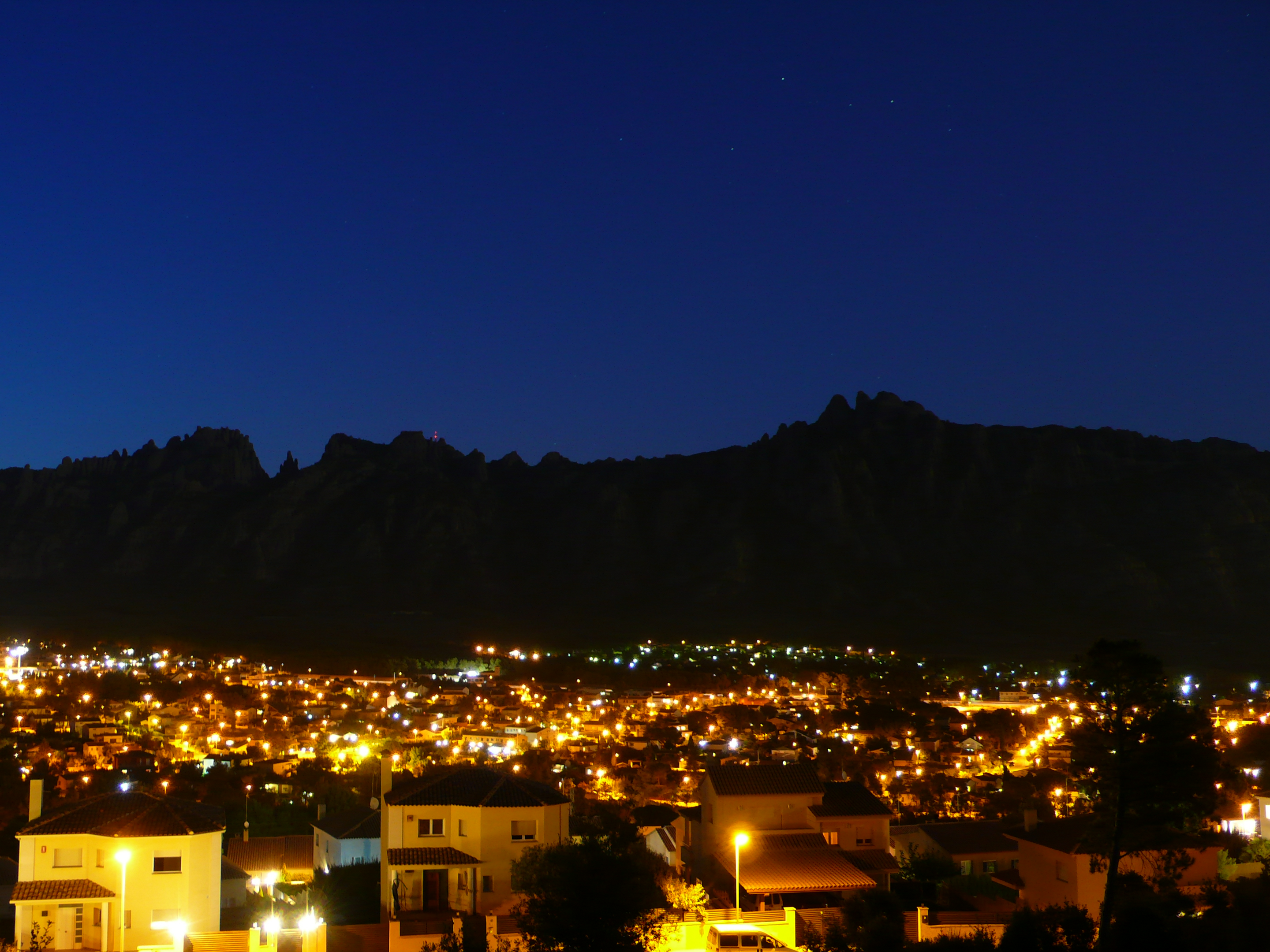
- Sunset at Collbató

- Coat of arms

- Location in Catalonia Collbató (Spain)
- Coordinates: 41°34′N 01°50′E
- Country: Spain
- Community: Catalonia
- Province: Barcelona
- Comarca: Baix Llobregat

Government
  - Mayor: Miquel Solà Navarro (2015)

Area
  - Total: 18.1 km^{2} (7.0 sq mi)
- Elevation: 388 m (1,273 ft)

Population (2025-01-01)
  - Total: 4,828
  - Density: 267/km^{2} (691/sq mi)
- Website: collbato.cat

Collbató (Catalan pronunciation: [ˌkɔʎβəˈto]) is a municipality in the comarca of the Baix Llobregat in Catalonia, Spain. It is situated on the southern slopes of Montserrat. The area has been inhabited since at least 4000 BC, as shown by Neolithic remains found in caves above the village (on display at the museum at the monastery of Montserrat). Although agriculture (olives, grapes and almonds) is the major economic activity, the village is also home to a workshop for the manufacture of organs.

== Images ==
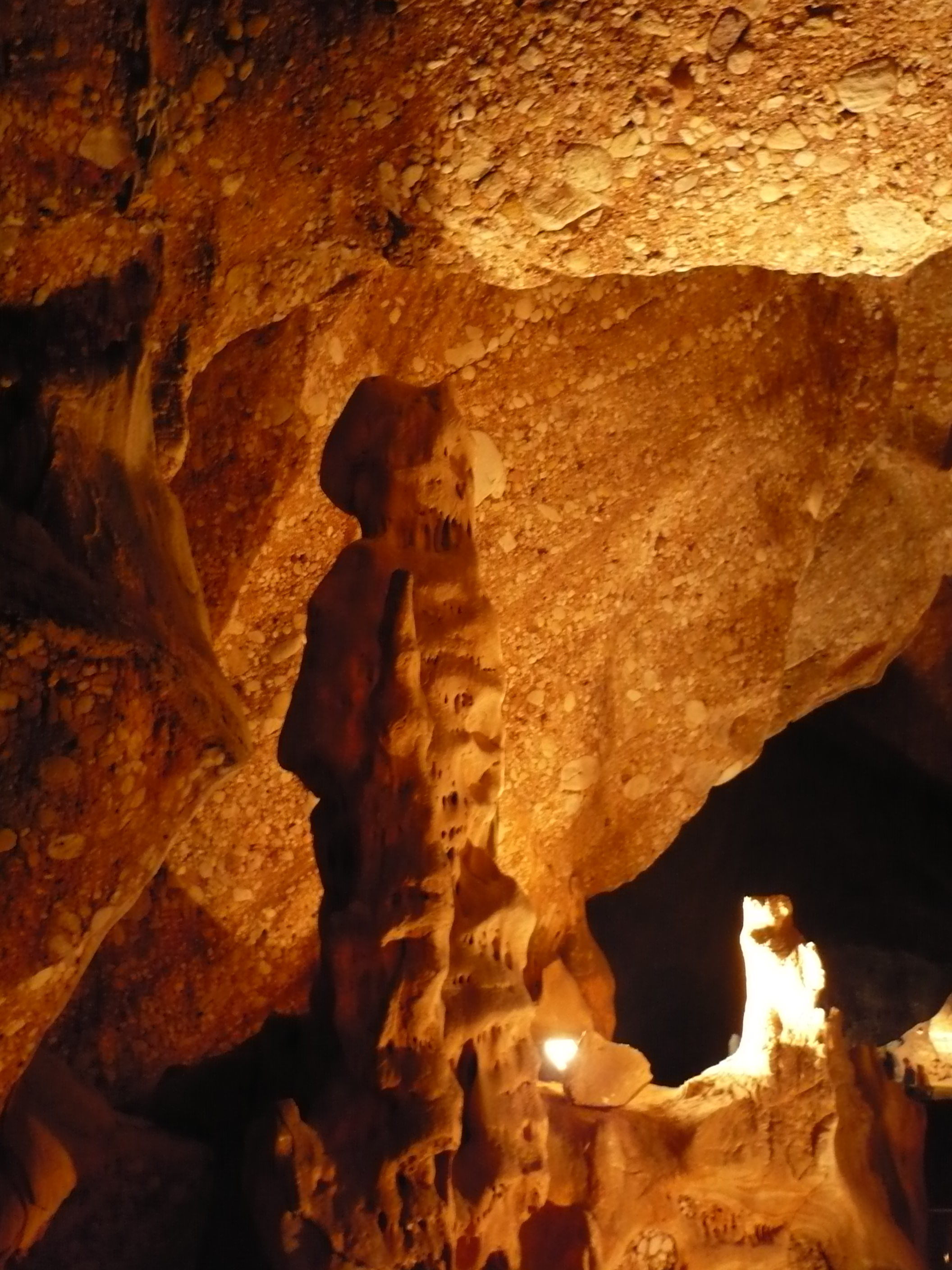
Salnitre Caves

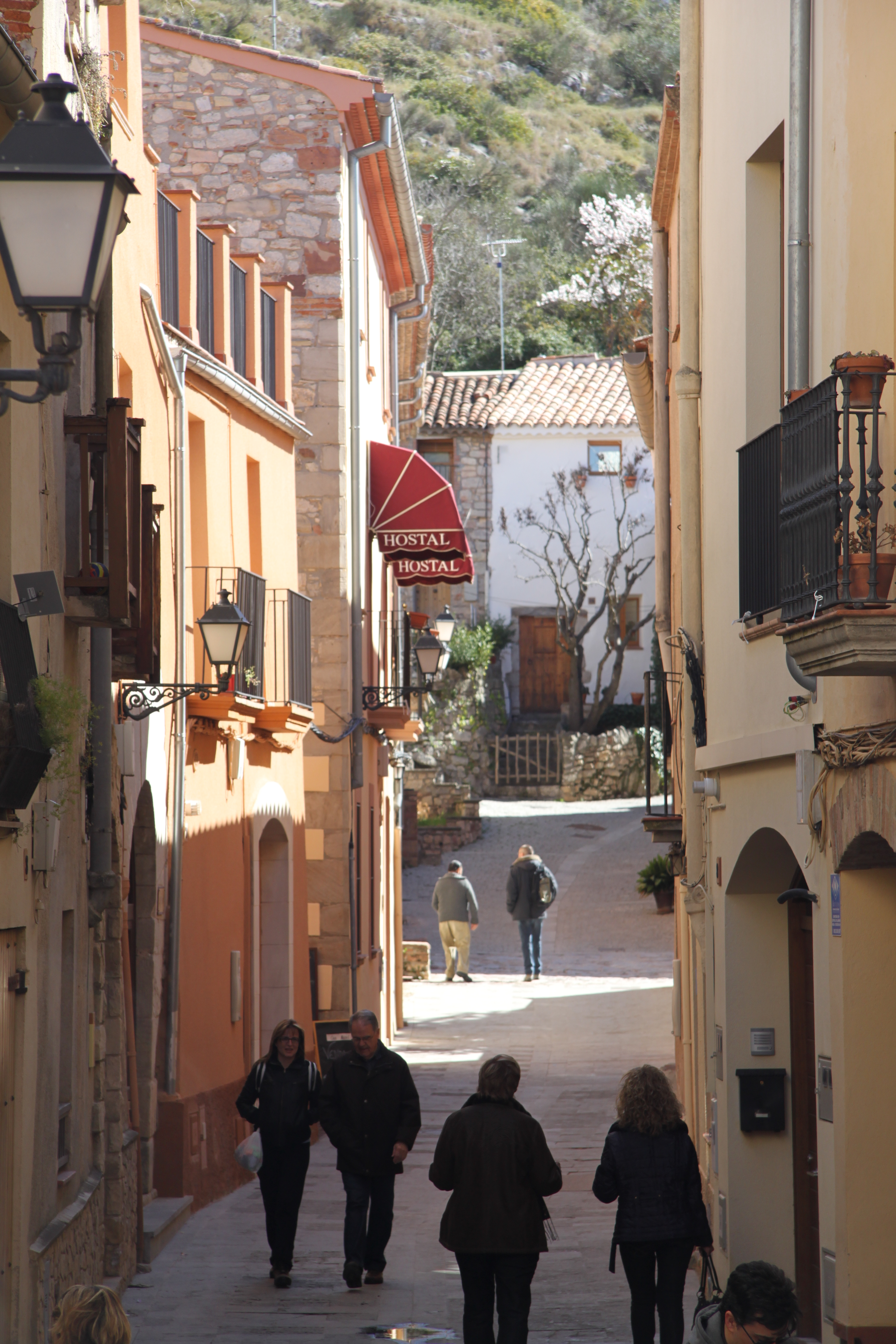
Amadeu Vives Street

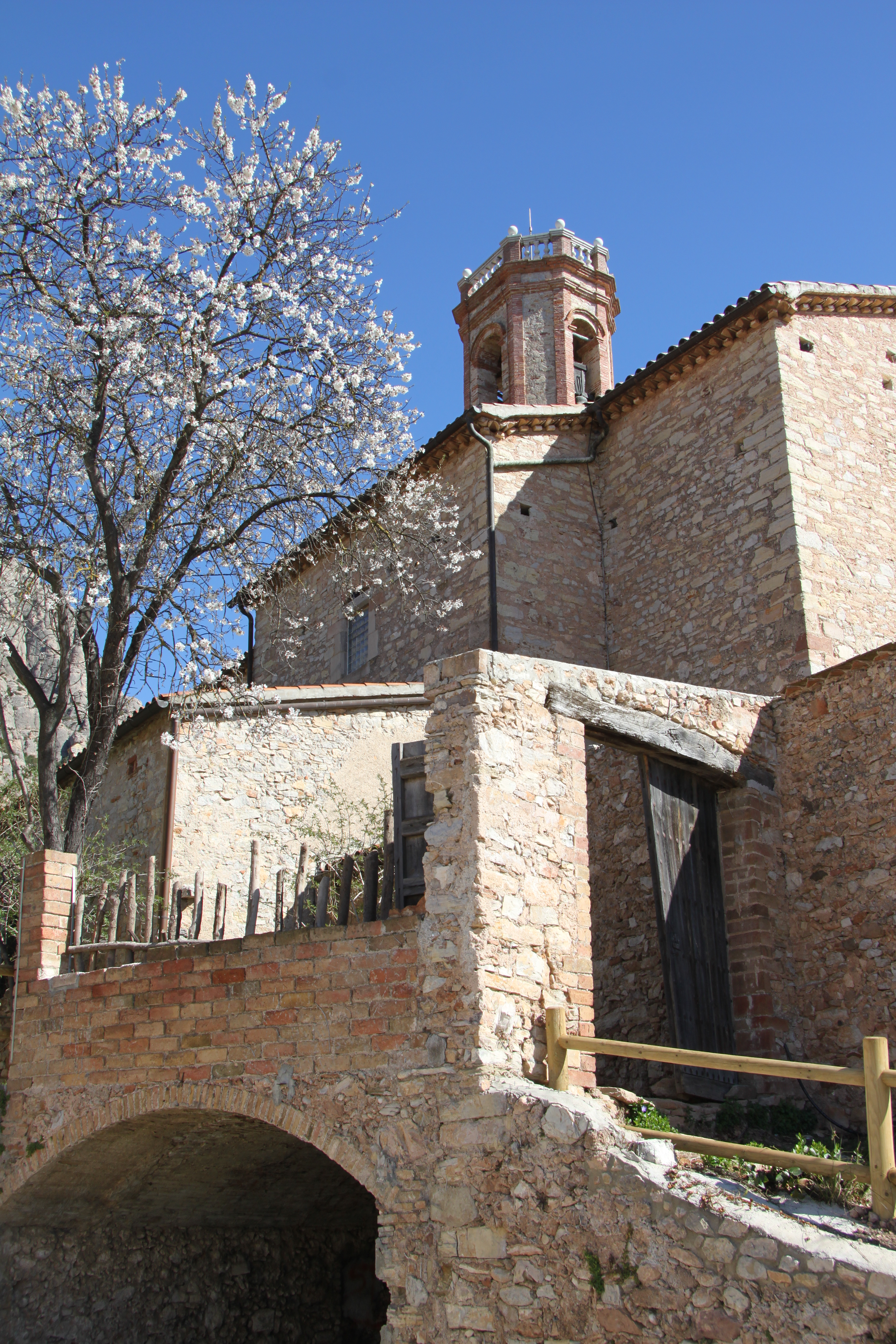
Sant Corneli Church 1

== Demography ==
1900	1930	1950	1970	1986	2002
665	509	416	451	728	2752
