= Hortensia Herrero =

Spanish businesswoman and philanthropist (born 1950)

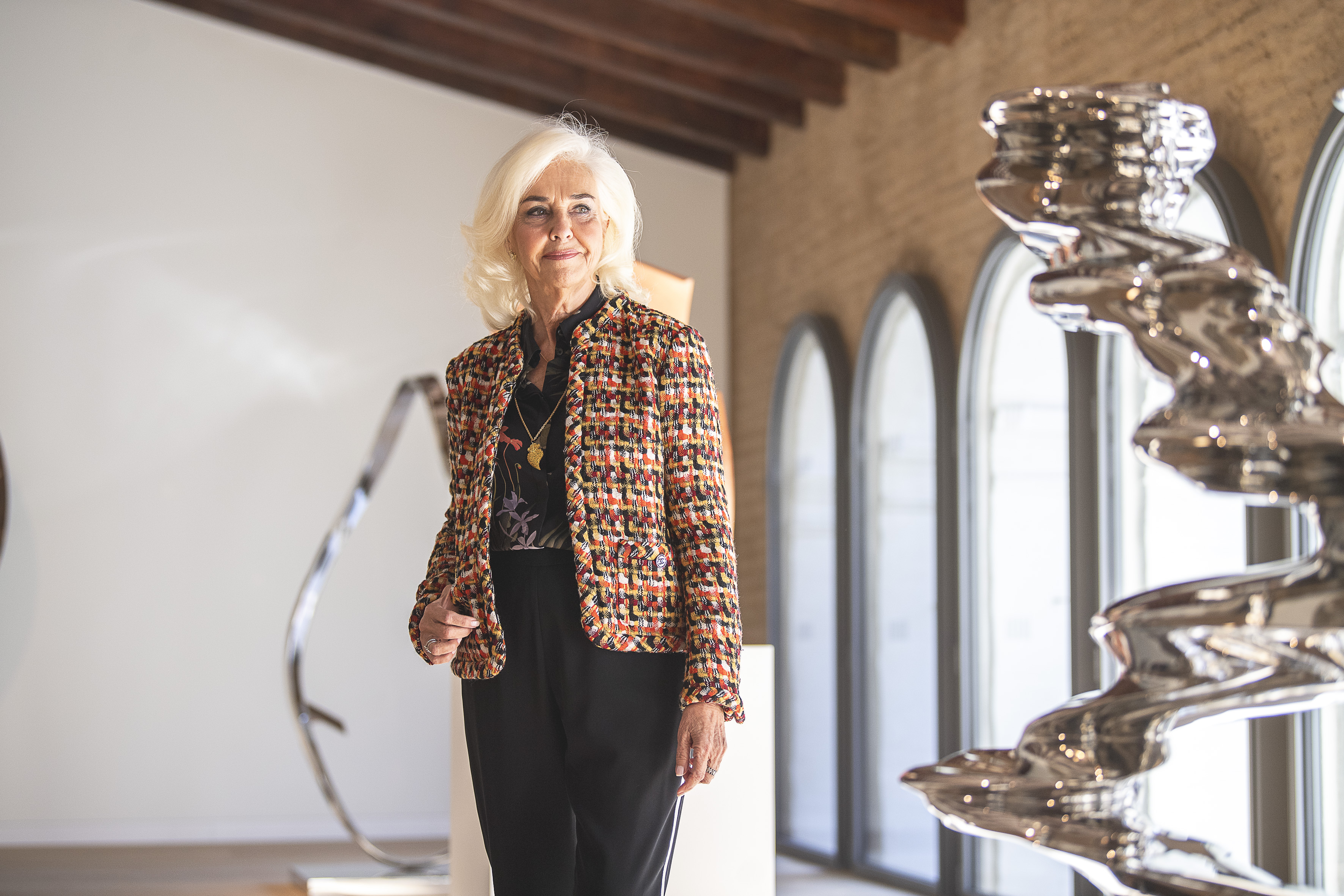
- Born: 20 May 1950 (age 76); Spain
- Occupation: Businesswoman
- Known for: Major shareholder of Mercadona
- Title: Vice-president, Mercadona
- Spouse: Juan Roig
- Children: 4

Hortensia Herrero Chacón (born 20 May 1950) is a Spanish billionaire businesswoman, and owner of 28% of Mercadona, a Spanish supermarket chain. As of February 2021, Forbes estimates her net worth at US $2.6 billion.

== Early life ==
She was born in Valencia on 20 May 1950, and has a degree in economics from the University of Valencia.

== Career ==
Since 1990, Herrero has, along with her husband, 80% of the shares of Mercadona, and is a vice-president of the company.

== Philanthropy ==
Herrero began her philanthropic and patronage work by creating the Hortensia Herrero Foundation based in Valencia. The Foundation aims to recover, develop and share the historical and cultural sensibility of the Comunitat Valenciana. Its main activities have been related to the recovery of artistic heritage and, in addition, it has launched projects related to the world of dance, ballet, music and art.

Some of its main actions regarding the recovery of the artistic and cultural heritage of the Comunitat Valenciana have been:

- San Nicolás Church.
- The College of High Silk Art.
- Santa Lucía Hermitage.
- Image and Niche of the Virgen de los Desamparados.

The Foundation also collaborates with different projects to support and promote culture, such as the alliance with the Faculty of Fine Arts and the master's degree in Audiovisual and Multimedia Productions, and also supports the initiative ‘Open Valencia’, promoted by the Association of Contemporary Art Gallery of Valencia, etc.

The Foundation has developed the celebration of the charity gala Valencia Danza / Somos Arte since 2014.

== Recognition ==
In 2014, Herrero was nominated "favourite daughter" by the city of Valencia. In 2022, Herrero was included in a "50 Over 50: EMEA 2022" by Forbes of 50 women aged over 50 in Europe, the Middle East and Africa.

== Personal life ==
She is married to Juan Roig, who she met when they were both studying economics at the University of Valencia. They have four children and live in Valencia, Spain.
