= Juan Roig =

Spanish billionaire businessman

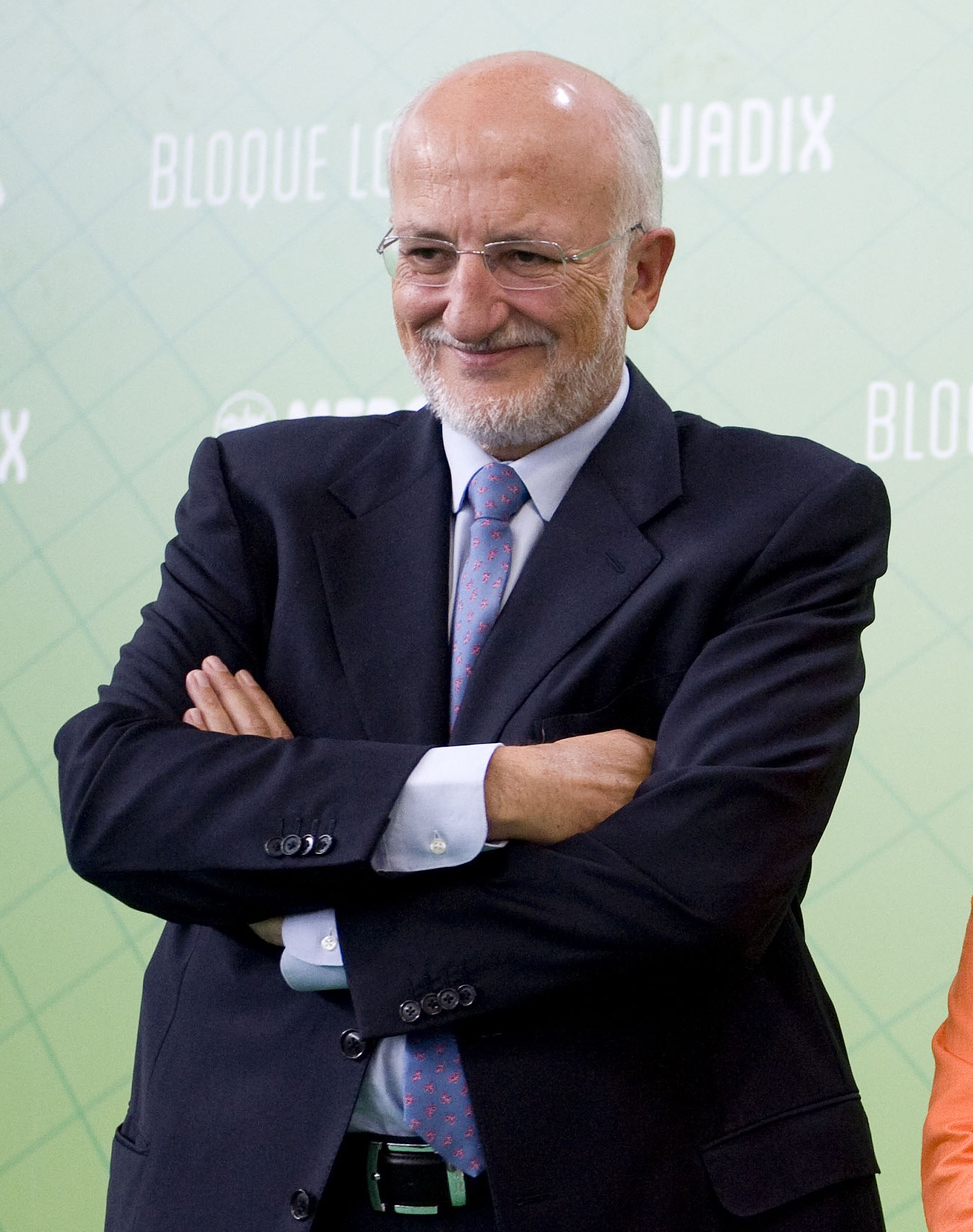
- Roig in 2013
- Born: 8 October 1949 (age 76); Valencia, Spain
- Education: University of Valencia (BA); University of Navarra (MA)
- Known for: Owner & president, Mercadona
- Spouse: Hortensia Herrero
- Children: 4

Juan Roig Alfonso (Valencian: [ˌxwan ˈrɔtʃ]; born 8 October 1949) is a Spanish billionaire businessman, president of the Spanish supermarket chain Mercadona and Valencia Basket. As of November 2024, his net worth was estimated at US$6 billion.

== Early life ==
Juan Roig was born on 8 October 1949 in Valencia. He studied in a Jesuit school in Valencia, then at a boarding school, and graduated in economics at Valencia, but was not an outstanding student. Eight years after graduating, he studied a postgraduate at IESE Business School, University of Navarra.

His parents ran a chain of eight butchers' shops (Cárnicas Roig) in La Pobla de Farnals, later converted to grocery stores.

== Business career ==
With three of his five brothers, Juan Roig bought the shops from his parents in 1981. He largely bought out his brothers in 1991, and went on to build up the Mercadona supermarket chain, which now runs over 1,400 stores. His success in retail has been based on a risky strategy of competitive pricing, and on technological innovations such as barcode scanners and automated distribution facilities. He introduced full-time contracts for all employees in the late 1990s.

Roig was awarded the Prince Felipe Prize for Business Excellence in 2010.

== Personal wealth ==
Forbes magazine in October 2013 reported that Roig was worth 5.8 billion euros, the second largest fortune in Spain. This in fact is the estimated value of the 78% stake in Mercadona jointly owned by himself and his wife. But since Mercadona shares are not publicly quoted, the figure is somewhat speculative. As of July 2018, Forbes estimated his net worth at US$4.3 billion. The shareholding yielded dividend income totalling over $400 million between 2006 and 2013 for Roig and his wife jointly.

In August 2022, Roig's net worth was estimated to be around US$3.5 billion (according to Forbes).

== Personal life ==
At university he met Hortensia Herrero, and they married in 1973. They have four children, and live in Valencia, Spain. His wife is now vice-president of Mercadona. He is said to favour family ownership in business, provided that the family members contribute positively.

He has been described as "shy, but a tough businessman" and as "a practical man, direct, austere, takes things seriously, his manner may appear cold if he does not trust the person he is talking to". Many aphorisms are ascribed to him, such as "in Spain we have to imitate the hard-working culture of the Chinese bazaars" and "you do not have to do a job that you like, but you have to make your job something you like doing".

== Philanthropy ==
Through his wholly owned company Alquería Capital, Roig supports Proyecto Lanzadera, which helps young entrepreneurs set up their businesses and offers them space within the Lanzadera Business Centre, in Valencia. He also sponsors a professional basketball team, called Valencia Basket.

== Honors and Recognitions ==
Juan Roig has received honorary doctorates from the Polytechnic University of Valencia (2007) and the University of Valencia (2018). He has held leadership roles in the Family Business Institute (IEF), EDEM, AECOC, and ASEDAS, and is a founding member of the Business Council for Competitiveness. His awards include the Prince Felipe Award for Business Excellence (2009), the Grand Cross of the Order of Jaume I, the Gold Medal for Merit at Work (2016), and induction into the Academy of Distinguished Entrepreneurs (2018). He has also been recognized among Spain's top entrepreneurs and ranked as the business leader with the best reputation by Merco.
