= 2007–08 La Liga =

77th season of La Liga

La Liga
- Season: 2007–08
- Dates: 25 August 2007 – 18 May 2008
- Champions: Real Madrid; 31st title
- Relegated: Zaragoza; Murcia; Levante
- Champions League: Real Madrid; Villarreal; Barcelona; Atlético Madrid
- UEFA Cup: Sevilla; Racing Santander; Valencia (as Copa del Rey winners)
- Intertoto Cup: Deportivo La Coruña
- Matches: 380
- Goals: 1,021 (2.69 per match)
- Top goalscorer: Dani Güiza (27 goals)
- Biggest home win: Real Madrid 7–0 Valladolid (10 February 2008)
- Biggest away win: Villarreal 0–5 Real Madrid (2 September 2007)
- Highest scoring: Atlético Madrid 6–3 Almería (6 April 2008)

The 2007–08 La Liga season was the 77th since its establishment. It began on 25 August 2007, and concluded on 18 May 2008.

Real Madrid secured a second consecutive La Liga title following a 2–1 victory over Osasuna on 4 May 2008. This season, all European leagues ended earlier than the previous season, due to the impending UEFA Euro 2008 tournament. It also was the first year of the new La Liga television agreement, which saw La Sexta mark its first year of television broadcasting.

This season was marred by the death of Antonio Puerta, the player of Sevilla, due to heart problems.

== Death of Antonio Puerta ==
On 25 August 2007, during started of season, Sevilla player Antonio Puerta collapsed and lost consciousness in the penalty area due to a cardiac arrest while on Sevilla's match against Getafe. After recovering and being substituted, Puerta was able to walk to the dressing room, where he collapsed once again. He was resuscitated by the doctors and taken, by ambulance, to the intensive care unit of Virgen del Rocío hospital, where he received cardiopulmonary resuscitation. Later, Puerta dead on 28 August 2007 after suffering multiple organ failure and irreversible brain damage as a result of multiple prolonged cardiac arrests due to an incurable, hereditary heart disease known as arrhythmogenic cardiomyopathy.

== Teams ==
Twenty teams competed in the league – the top seventeen teams from the previous season and the three teams promoted from the Segunda División. The promoted teams were Valladolid, Almería, and Murcia. Both Valladolid and Murcia returned to the top flight after a three-year absence while UD Almería were promoted for the first time. However, since AD Almería played in the 1980–81 La Liga, the city of Almería returned to the top fight after an absence of twenty six years. They replaced Celta de Vigo, Real Sociedad and Gimnàstic, ending their top flight spells of two, forty and one year respectively.

Location of teams in La Liga 2007–08

=== Stadiums ===
Team	Stadium	Capacity
Barcelona	Camp Nou	98,772
Real Madrid	Santiago Bernabéu	80,354
Espanyol	Lluís Companys	55,926
Atlético Madrid	Vicente Calderón	55,005
Valencia	Mestalla	55,000
Betis	Manuel Ruiz de Lopera	52,132
Sevilla	Ramón Sánchez Pizjuán	45,500
Athletic Bilbao	San Mamés	39,750
Deportivo La Coruña	Riazor	34,600
Zaragoza	La Romareda	34,596
Murcia*	Nueva Condomina	33,045
Valladolid*	José Zorrilla	26,512
Levante	Ciutat de València	25,354
Mallorca	ONO Estadi	23,142
Villarreal	El Madrigal	23,000
Racing Santander	El Sardinero	22,400
Recreativo	Nuevo Colombino	21,600
Osasuna	Estadio Reyno de Navarra	19,553
Getafe	Coliseum Alfonso Pérez	16,300
Almería*	Estadio del Mediterráneo	15,000

(*) Promoted from Segunda División.

=== Personnel and kits ===
Team	Chairman	Head Coach	Kit manufacturer	Shirt sponsor (front)	Shirt sponsor (back)	Shirt sponsor (sleeve)	Shorts sponsor
Almería	Alfonso García	(Spain) Unai Emery	UDA	Obrascampo	Urcisol, Andalucía	Andalucía, David Bisbal	None
Athletic Bilbao	Fernando García	(Spain) Joaquín Caparrós	100% Athletic	None	None	None	None
Atlético Madrid	Enrique Cerezo	(Mexico) Javier Aguirre	Nike	Kia	Kyocera	None	Asisa Salud
Barcelona	Joan Laporta	(Netherlands) Frank Rijkaard	Nike	UNICEF	None	TV3	None
Betis	Leon Gomez	(Spain) Paco Chaparro	Kappa	Andalucía/Garmin	Andalucía	Andalucía	Grupo Azabache
Deportivo	Augusto Lendoiro	(Spain) Miguel Ángel Lotina	Canterbury of New Zealand	Fadesa/Martinsa-Fadesa	None	None	None
Espanyol	Daniel Sánchez Llibre	(Spain) Ernesto Valverde	uhlsport	Quat Inversiones	None	TV3	Hoteles Hesperia
Getafe	Ángel Torres	(Denmark) Michael Laudrup	Joma	Galco	Opción Centro de Ocio	None	JHK T-shirt, Thecam
Levante	Julio Romero	(Spain) José Ángel Moreno	Luanvi	Comunitat Valenciana	None	Canal Nou	None
Mallorca	Vicenç Grande	(Spain) Gregorio Manzano	Reial	Viajes Iberia	Construcciones Llabrés Feliu	IB3	Illes Balears
Murcia	Jesús Samper	(Spain) Javier Clemente	Real Murcia	Caja Murcia	Asesorías Financieras Centre Finance	La 7	Grupo Invercon
Osasuna	Patxi Izco	(Spain) Cuco Ziganda	Astore	Restaura	Reyno de Navarra/Yingli Solar	Caja Navarra	Yingli Solar/Reyno de Navarra, NGS Technology
Racing Santander	Francisco Pernía	(Spain) Marcelino	Joma	Norquimia	SEOP Obras y Proyectos/Lolin	None	SEOP Obras y Proyectos
Real Madrid	Ramón Calderón	(Germany) Bernd Schuster	Adidas	Bwin.com	None	None	None
Recreativo	Francisco Mendoza	(Spain) Lucas Alcaraz	Cejudo	Cepsa/Cajasol	Andalucía	Toyota Niponuba	Condado de Huelva, Fresón de Palos
Sevilla	José María del Nido	(Spain) Manolo Jiménez	Joma	888.com	Andalucía	None	888.com
Valencia	Vicente Soriano	(Spain) Voro	Nike	Toyota	Compac Encimeras	Canal Nou	None
Valladolid	Carlos Suárez Sureda	(Spain) José Luis Mendilibar	Puma	Caja Duero	Asómate a Valladolid/Proinlasa	Collosa	Del Cura y Miranda AXA, Castilla y León es Vida
Villarreal	Fernando Roig	(Chile) Manuel Pellegrini	Puma	Aeroport Castelló	None	Canal Nou	None
Zaragoza	Eduardo Bandrés	(Spain) Manolo Villanova	Mercury/Adidas	Expo Zaragoza 2008 Telefónica	None	Aragón Televisión	None

== League table ==
Pos	Team	Pld	W	D	L	GF	GA	GD	Pts	Qualification or relegation
1	Real Madrid (C)	38	27	4	7	84	36	+48	85	Qualification for the Champions League group stage
2	Villarreal	38	24	5	9	63	40	+23	77	Qualification for the Champions League group stage
3	Barcelona	38	19	10	9	76	43	+33	67	Qualification for the Champions League third qualifying round
4	Atlético Madrid	38	19	7	12	66	47	+19	64 (Note: ATM 4–3 SEV; SEV 1–2 ATM)	Qualification for the Champions League third qualifying round
5	Sevilla	38	20	4	14	75	49	+26	64	Qualification for the UEFA Cup first round
6	Racing Santander	38	17	9	12	42	41	+1	60	Qualification for the UEFA Cup first round
7	Mallorca	38	15	14	9	69	54	+15	59	
8	Almería	38	14	10	14	42	45	−3	52 (Note: DEP 0–3 ALM; ALM 1–0 DEP)	
9	Deportivo La Coruña	38	15	7	16	46	47	−1	52	Qualification for the Intertoto Cup third round
10	Valencia	38	15	6	17	48	62	−14	51	Qualification for the UEFA Cup first round (Note: Valencia entered UEFA Cup as winners of 2007–08 Copa del Rey.)
11	Athletic Bilbao	38	13	11	14	40	43	−3	50	
12	Espanyol	38	13	9	16	43	53	−10	48	
13	Real Betis	38	12	11	15	45	51	−6	47 (Note: BET 3–2 GET; GET 1–1 BET)	
14	Getafe	38	12	11	15	44	48	−4	47	
15	Valladolid	38	11	12	15	42	57	−15	45	
16	Recreativo Huelva	38	11	11	16	40	60	−20	44	
17	Osasuna	38	12	7	19	37	44	−7	43	
18	Zaragoza (R)	38	10	12	16	50	61	−11	42	Relegation to the Segunda División
19	Murcia (R)	38	7	9	22	36	65	−29	30	Relegation to the Segunda División
20	Levante (R)	38	7	5	26	33	75	−42	26	Relegation to the Segunda División

Source: LFP
Rules for classification: 1st points; 2nd head-to-head points; 3rd head-to-head goal difference; 4th head-to-head goals scored; 5th goal difference; 6th number of goals scored; 7th Fair-play points
(C) Champions; (R) Relegated
Notes:

La Liga 2007–08 winners

31st title

== Results ==
Home \ Away	ALM	ATH	ATM	FCB	BET	RCD	ESP	GET	LEV	MLL	MUR	OSA	RAC	RMA	REC	SFC	VCF	VLD	VIL	ZAR
Almería		1–1	0–0	2–2	1–1	1–0	1–0	0–2	2–1	1–1	1–0	2–0	0–1	2–0	0–2	1–0	1–2	1–0	1–0	0–1
Athletic Bilbao	1–1		0–2	1–1	0–0	2–2	1–0	1–0	1–0	1–2	1–1	0–0	0–0	0–1	2–0	2–0	5–1	2–0	1–2	1–1
Atlético Madrid	6–3	1–2		4–2	1–3	1–0	1–2	1–0	3–0	1–1	1–1	2–0	4–0	0–2	3–0	4–3	1–0	4–3	3–4	4–0
Barcelona	2–0	3–1	3–0		3–0	2–1	0–0	0–0	5–1	2–3	4–0	1–0	1–0	0–1	3–0	2–1	6–0	4–1	1–2	4–1
Betis	3–1	1–2	0–2	3–2		0–1	2–2	3–2	0–1	3–0	4–0	0–3	1–1	2–1	1–1	0–2	1–2	1–1	0–1	2–1
Deportivo La Coruña	0–3	3–0	0–3	2–0	1–0		2–0	1–1	1–0	1–1	3–1	1–2	0–1	1–0	0–2	2–1	2–4	3–1	0–2	1–1
Espanyol	1–3	2–1	0–2	1–1	1–2	1–0		1–0	1–0	2–1	0–0	0–1	0–3	2–1	1–2	2–4	2–0	0–1	3–0	1–1
Getafe	4–2	2–0	1–1	2–0	1–1	0–0	0–1		2–1	3–3	2–0	0–2	2–1	0–1	1–1	3–2	0–0	0–3	1–3	0–0
Levante	3–0	1–2	0–1	1–4	4–3	0–1	1–1	3–1		2–2	0–0	2–1	1–1	0–2	0–2	0–2	1–5	0–3	1–2	2–1
Mallorca	0–0	0–0	1–0	0–2	1–1	1–0	2–2	4–2	3–0		1–1	2–1	3–1	1–1	7–1	2–3	0–2	4–2	0–1	3–2
Murcia	0–1	1–2	1–1	3–5	0–0	0–2	4–0	0–3	2–3	1–4		2–0	2–1	1–1	1–0	0–0	1–0	0–1	0–1	2–1
Osasuna	2–1	2–0	3–1	0–0	0–1	0–1	1–2	0–2	4–1	3–1	2–1		0–2	1–2	0–1	1–1	0–0	2–2	3–2	1–0
Racing Santander	1–0	1–0	0–2	0–0	3–0	1–3	1–1	2–0	1–0	3–1	3–2	1–0		0–2	2–0	0–3	1–0	2–0	0–2	2–2
Real Madrid	3–1	3–0	2–1	4–1	2–0	3–1	2–1	0–1	5–2	4–3	1–0	2–0	3–1		2–0	3–1	2–3	7–0	3–2	2–0
Recreativo	1–1	1–1	0–0	2–2	1–1	3–2	2–1	1–3	2–0	0–2	4–2	1–0	0–0	2–3		1–2	0–1	1–1	0–2	2–1
Sevilla	1–4	4–1	1–2	1–1	3–0	0–1	2–3	4–1	2–1	1–2	3–1	2–1	4–1	2–0	4–1		3–0	2–0	2–0	5–0
Valencia	0–1	0–3	3–1	0–3	3–1	2–2	1–2	2–1	0–0	0–3	3–0	3–0	1–2	1–5	1–1	1–2		2–1	0–3	1–0
Valladolid	1–0	1–2	1–1	1–1	0–0	2–2	2–1	0–0	1–0	1–1	1–4	0–0	0–1	1–1	3–1	0–0	0–2		2–0	2–1
Villarreal	1–1	1–0	3–0	3–1	0–1	4–3	2–0	2–0	3–0	1–1	2–0	0–0	0–0	0–5	1–1	3–2	3–0	2–0		2–0
Zaragoza	1–1	1–0	2–1	1–2	0–3	1–0	3–3	1–1	3–0	2–2	3–1	2–1	1–1	2–2	3–0	2–0	2–2	2–3	4–1	

Source: LFP
Legend: Blue = home team win; Yellow = draw; Red = away team win.

== Awards ==
Award	Recipient
Alfredo Di Stéfano Trophy	(Spain) Raúl (Real Madrid)
Pichichi Trophy	(Spain) Dani Güiza (Mallorca)
Miguel Muñoz Trophy	(Chile) Manuel Pellegrini (Villarreal)
Zamora Trophy	(Spain) Iker Casillas (Real Madrid)
Zarra Trophy	(Spain) Dani Güiza (Mallorca)

Team of the Year

Team of the Year
Goalkeeper	(Spain) Iker Casillas (Real Madrid)			
Defenders	(Spain) Sergio Ramos (Real Madrid)	(Argentina) Fabricio Coloccini (Deportivo La Coruña)	(Argentina) Cata Díaz (Getafe)	(Spain) Joan Capdevila (Villarreal)
Midfielders	(Spain) Guti (Real Madrid)		(Spain) Andrés Iniesta (Barcelona)	(Spain) Jorge López (Racing Santander)
Forwards	(Spain) Dani Güiza (Mallorca)		(Brazil) Luis Fabiano (Sevilla)	(Argentina) Sergio Agüero (Atlético Madrid)

=== Pichichi Trophy ===
The Pichichi Trophy is awarded to the player who scores the most goals in a season.

Rank	Player	Club	Goals
1	(Spain) Dani Güiza	Mallorca	27
2	(Brazil) Luís Fabiano	Sevilla	24
3	(Argentina) Sergio Agüero	Atlético Madrid	19
4	(Turkey) Nihat Kahveci	Villarreal	18
4	(Spain) Raúl	Real Madrid	18
4	(Spain) David Villa	Valencia	18
7	(Brazil) Ricardo Oliveira	Zaragoza	17
8	(Uruguay) Diego Forlán	Atlético Madrid	16
8	(Netherlands) Ruud van Nistelrooy	Real Madrid	16
10	(Cameroon) Samuel Eto'o	Barcelona	16
10	(Mali) Frédéric Kanouté	Sevilla	16

=== Zamora Trophy ===
The Ricardo Zamora Trophy is awarded to the goalkeeper with the lowest ratio of goals conceded to matches played.

Rank	Player	Club	Goals against	Matches	Average
1	(Spain) Iker Casillas	Real Madrid	32	36	0.89
2	(Spain) Víctor Valdés	Barcelona	35	35	1
3	(Spain) Toño	Racing Santander	31	30	1.03
4	(Spain) Ricardo	Osasuna	38	36	1.06
5	(Spain) Miguel Ángel Moyà	Mallorca	34	29	1.17
6	(Argentina) Roberto Abbondanzieri	Getafe	42	34	1.24
7	(Cameroon) Carlos Kameni	Espanyol	38	29	1.31
8	(Spain) Andrés Palop	Sevilla	41	30	1.37
9	(Italy) Stefano Sorrentino	Recreativo Huelva	60	38	1.58
10	(Spain) César	Zaragoza	56	35	1.6

=== Top assists ===
Rank	Player	Club	Assists
1	(Spain) Guti	Real Madrid	17
2	(Argentina) Ariel Ibagaza	Mallorca	15
3	(Brazil) Dani Alves	Sevilla	14
4	(Argentina) Lionel Messi	Barcelona	12
5	(Venezuela) Juan Arango	Mallorca	9
5	(France) Thierry Henry	Barcelona	9
5	(Spain) Luis García	Espanyol	9
5	(Spain) Sergio García	Zaragoza	9
9	(Brazil) Robinho	Real Madrid	8
9	(Spain) Marcos Senna	Villarreal	8

- Source: ESPN Soccernet

=== Fair Play award ===
Rank	Club	Points
1	Deportivo La Coruña	89
2	Villarreal	92
3	Barcelona	93
4	Valladolid	99
5	Racing Santander	107
6	Real Madrid	109
7	Getafe	117
8	Levante	123
8	Mallorca	123
8	Valencia	123
11	Espanyol	127
12	Zaragoza	129
13	Sevilla	140
14	Almería	141
15	Osasuna	143
16	Atlético Madrid	157
17	Recreativo Huelva	158
18	Murcia	159
19	Athletic Bilbao	160
20	Real Betis	178

- Source: 2007–08 Fair Play Rankings Season.

=== Pedro Zaballa award ===
Spain supporters

== Season statistics ==
=== Scoring ===
- First goal of the season: Sergio Agüero for Atlético Madrid against Real Madrid (25 August 2007)
- Fastest goal in a match: 7 seconds – Joseba Llorente for Valladolid against Espanyol (20 January 2008)
- Goal scored at the latest point in a match: 90+4 minutes
  - Manu for Getafe against Recreativo (2 September 2007)
  - Ebi Smolarek for Racing Santander against Recreativo (23 March 2008)
  - Roberto Ayala for Zaragoza against Deportivo (3 May 2008)
- Widest winning margin: 7 – Real Madrid 7–0 Valladolid (10 February 2008)
- Most goals in a match: 9 – Atlético Madrid 6–3 Almería (6 April 2008)
- First own goal of the season: Daniel Jarque for Sevilla against Espanyol (25 September 2007)
- First hat-trick of the season:
  - (France) Thierry Henry for Barcelona against Levante (29 September 2007)
- Most goals in a match by one player: 3 goals
- Hat-tricks of the season:
  - (France) Thierry Henry for Barcelona against Levante (29 September 2007)
  - (Italy) Christian Riganò for Levante against Almería (4 November 2007)
  - (Spain) Joseba Llorente for Valladolid against Recreativo (13 January 2008)
  - (Cameroon) Samuel Eto'o for Barcelona against Levante (24 February 2008)
  - (Venezuela) Juan Arango for Mallorca against Recreativo (9 March 2008)
  - (Spain) Xisco for Deportivo against Murcia (30 March 2008)
  - (Spain) Dani Güiza for Mallorca against Murcia (20 April 2008)
  - (Spain) David Villa for Valencia against Levante (11 May 2008)
  - (Mexico) Giovani dos Santos for Barcelona against Murcia (17 May 2008)
- Most goals by one team in a match: 7 Goals
  - Real Madrid 7–0 Valladolid (10 February 2008)
  - Mallorca 7–1 Recreativo (9 March 2008)
- Most goals in one half by one team: 5
  - Real Madrid 7–0 Valladolid (10 February 2008)
  - Mallorca 7–1 Recreativo (9 March 2008)
- Most goals scored by losing team: 3 Goals
  - Atlético Madrid 4–3 Sevilla (31 October 2007)
  - Atlético Madrid 3–4 Villarreal (4 November 2007)
  - Real Madrid 4–3 Mallorca (11 November 2007)
  - Atlético Madrid 4–3 Valladolid (25 November 2007)
  - Levante 4–3 Betis (25 November 2007)
  - Villarreal 4–3 Deportivo (13 January 2008)
  - Atlético Madrid 6–3 Almería (6 April 2008)
  - Murcia 3–5 Barcelona (17 May 2008)

=== Cards ===
- First yellow card: Luis Perea for Atlético Madrid against Real Madrid (25 August 2007)
- First red card: David Cortés for Getafe against Sevilla (25 August 2007)

=== Average home attendance ===
No.	Club	Average	Change	Highest
1	FC Barcelona	76,234	2.9%	98,000
2	Real Madrid CF	67,560	-5.5%	80,354
3	Atlético de Madrid	45,253	6.9%	55,000
4	Valencia CF	40,711	0.8%	50,000
5	Sevilla FC	39,553	-9.3%	45,500
6	Real Betis	37,421	-3.4%	48,000
7	Athletic Club	36,263	-2.4%	40,000
8	Real Zaragoza	30,711	10.2%	35,000
9	Real Murcia CF	23,548	92.5%	32,000
10	RCD Espanyol	21,870	8.3%	40,000
11	Villarreal CF	19,395	4.1%	24,000
12	RCD Mallorca	17,842	7.4%	22,000
13	Deportivo de La Coruña	17,800	7.1%	34,600
14	Real Valladolid	17,635	91.0%	26,000
15	Racing de Santander	17,521	8.0%	24,000
16	Recreativo de Huelva	17,376	-4.7%	20,096
17	CA Osasuna	17,225	3.1%	19,800
18	UD Almería	15,567	74.0%	21,500
19	Levante UD	12,330	-26.6%	20,229
20	Getafe CF	10,658	-3.6%	16,000

=== Clean sheets ===
- Most clean sheets – Villarreal (17)
- Fewest clean sheets – Levante (4)

=== Overall ===
- Most wins – Real Madrid (27)
- Fewest wins – Murcia and Levante (7)
- Most draws – Mallorca (14)
- Fewest draws – Real Madrid and Sevilla (4)
- Most losses – Levante (26)
- Fewest losses – Real Madrid (7)
- Most goals scored – Real Madrid (84)
- Fewest goals scored – Levante (33)
- Most goals conceded – Levante (75)
- Fewest goals conceded – Real Madrid (36)

=== Home ===
- Most wins – Real Madrid (17)
- Fewest wins – Levante (5)
- Most draws – Valladolid (9)
- Fewest draws – Real Madrid (0)
- Most losses – Levante (10)
- Fewest losses – Real Madrid and Villarreal (2)
- Most goals scored – Real Madrid (53)
- Fewest goals scored – Almería (18)
- Most goals conceded – Levante (34)
- Fewest goals conceded – Barcelona (12)

=== Away ===
- Most wins – Villarreal (12)
- Fewest wins – Murcia and Zaragoza (1)
- Most draws – Mallorca and Barcelona (8)
- Fewest draws – Villarreal (0)
- Most losses – Levante (16)
- Fewest losses – Real Madrid and Mallorca (5)
- Most goals scored – Mallorca (34)
- Fewest goals scored – Levante (11)
- Most goals conceded – Levante (41)
- Fewest goals conceded – Real Madrid (18)

== See also ==
- List of transfers of La Liga – 2007–08 season
- 2007–08 Segunda División
- 2007–08 Copa del Rey
- Antonio Puerta
