= 2012 European general strike =

- Part of European Anti-austerity movement during the European sovereign debt crisis in the Great Recession in Europe and the impact of the Arab Spring
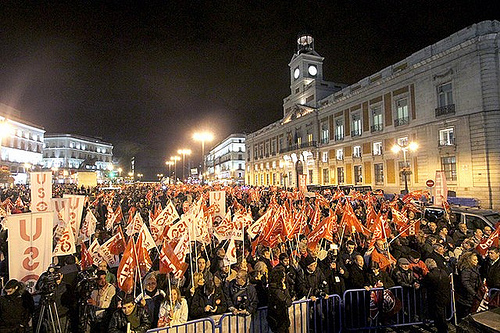
- Date: 14 November 2012
- Location: Europe, Spain, Italy, France, Portugal, Greece, Belgium, Malta, Cyprus
- Caused by: Europe-wide austerity measures, Unemployment, Salaries decrease
- Goals: Revert Europe-wide austerity measures, improve salaries and working conditions
- Methods: Strike action, including flying pickets Civil disobedience

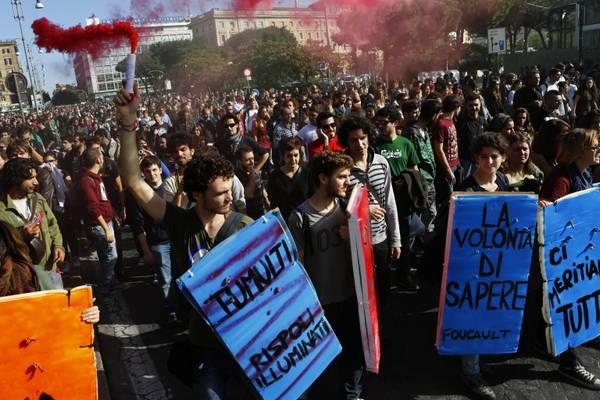
Demonstration in Rome

The 2012 European general strike, first known as the 2012 Iberian Strike, was a general strike called initially by Spanish and Portuguese unions on 14 November 2012, to whom several unions and collectives from other European countries joined in strike or other form of protests.

It was the first time in history that a European Union-wide series of strikes coincided in time. General strike was called in Cyprus, Malta, Portugal, Italy and Spain, while protests and mobilizations of support occurred in France, Greece and in Wallonia, Belgium.

== See also ==
- Anti-austerity movement
- Great Recession in Europe
- Impact of the Arab Spring
- European sovereign debt crisis
- Economic history of Europe
- Anti-austerity movement in Spain (15-M Movement)
- Anti-austerity movement in Greece
- Anti-austerity protests in Ireland
- Anti-austerity protests in Portugal
- List of protests in the 21st century
