= Great Recession in Europe =

European economic recession

The European recession is part of the Great Recession that began in mid-2007. The crisis spread rapidly and affected much of the region, with several countries already in recession as of February 2009, and most others suffering marked economic setbacks. The global recession was first seen in Europe, as Ireland was the first country to fall into recession from Q2-Q3 2007 – followed by temporary growth in Q4 2007 – and then a two-year-long recession.

== Eurozone ==
The Eurozone recession has been dated from the first quarter of 2008 to the second quarter of 2009. In the eurozone as a whole, industrial production fell 1.9% in May 2008, the sharpest one-month decline for the region since the Black Wednesday exchange rate crisis in 1992. European car sales fell 7.8% in May compared with a year earlier. Retail sales fell by 0.6% in June from the May level and by 3.1% from June in the previous year. Germany was the only country out of the four biggest economies in the eurozone to register an increase of activity in July though the increase was sharply down. Economic analysts from RBS and Capital Economics say the decline raises the risk of the eurozone entering a recession in 2008. In the second quarter, the eurozone's economy was reported to have declined by 0.2%.

=== Ireland ===
The global recession was first seen in Europe, as Ireland was the first country to fall into recession from Q2-Q3 2007 – followed by temporary growth in Q4 2007 – and then a two-year-long recession. Republic of Ireland in the first quarter of 2008 reported a contraction in GDP of 1.5 percent, its first economic contraction since it began reporting by quarter and first recorded contraction since 1983. However, Ireland's Central Statistics Office reported growth in GNP of about 0.8 percent, Ireland's government considers GNP a better measure of the economy. Analysts have predicted Ireland's economy will contract further in the rest of the year. A report from NCB stockbrokers predicts gross national product will fall by 1 percent in 2008 and by 0.4 percent in 2009 due to a decline in multi-nationals hit by the slowdown of the global economy. An economist from NCB said non-residential investment would fall by 5 percent in 2008 and by 12 percent in 2009.

Ireland's GDP saw a contraction in the second quarter by 0.5 percent, making Ireland the first member of the eurozone to enter a recession. The government is being advised by Merrill Lynch, the American broker that ran out of capital in September 2008. In January 2009 it was forced to nationalise its third largest bank, Anglo Irish Bank and to announce recapitalisation of its top two banks, AIB and Bank of Ireland. In February 2009, the government announced record levels of unemployment in the country, with its highest monthly increase in 40 years and 1,500 people being laid off daily. Ireland exited the recession in the 3rd quarter of 2009, posting a 0.3 percent growth in its economy.

=== Spain ===
Spain's Martinsa-Fadesa, a construction company, declared bankruptcy after failing to refinance a debt of €5.1 billion. The two banks with most exposure to Martinsa-Fadesa were reportedly Caja Madrid, at €900m, and Banco Popular Español, at €400m. Spain's finance minister Pedro Solbes said it would not bail out the company. In the second quarter, house prices in Spain fell 20 percent. In Castilla–La Mancha some 69 percent of all houses built over the past three years are still unsold. Deutsche Bank said it expects a 35 percent fall in real house prices by 2011. Spain's premier, Jose Luis Zapatero, blamed the European Central Bank for making matters worse by raising interest rates. More than 98 percent of home loans in Spain are priced off floating rates linked to Euribor, which has risen 145 basis points since August. Housing accounts for over 10 percent of Spain's economy. The Bank of Spain is concerned about the health of smaller regional lenders with heavy exposure to the mortgage market.

Although Spain has avoided recession in the first half of 2008, unemployment in the country has risen by 425,000 over 2007–2008, reaching 9.9 percent. Car sales in Spain fell 31 percent in May. Spain's factory output slumped 5.5 percent in May 2008. The country's business lobby Circulo de Empresarios warned of a "high probability" that Spain's economy would fall into recession in the second half of 2008 due to the housing collapse. Spain had a 7.9 percent decline in retail sales in June compared to the previous year, the largest drop since Spain began registering the results and the seventh consecutive monthly decline. This included a 17.9 percent drop in retail sales of household goods. In Spain food sales in the month of June fell by 6.8 percent.

Morgan Stanley issued a major alert on the health of Spanish banks and the Spanish economy in a report, saying, "A momentous economic slowdown is now under way. We believe the deterioration in Spain is just in the beginning stages. The bulk of the pain will be suffered in 2009." Morgan Stanley also warned there was 40 percent chance of a 0.5 percent contraction of the Spanish economy in 2009, with a risk of an even more extreme 1.4 percent contraction in 2009. According to Spanish automobile manufacturers' association ANFAC new car sales fell 27.5 percent in July from the same time in 2007, the third consecutive monthly drop of over 20 percent. Spain's government forecast the unemployment rate would rise to 10.4 percent in 2008 and to 12.5 percent in 2009. Spain's second largest bank BBVA predicted the unemployment rate could reach 14 percent in 2009. Spain's Purchasing Managers' Index for the manufacturing sector in July fell to a new low suggesting a deep recession. In the second quarter Spain's economy grew by 0.1 percent, the lowest gain in 15 years.

As of December 2009, The Spanish government forecasted the unemployment rate would rise to 20 percent in 2009. It is predicted to be a 25 percent rate, due to the way the tally is carried out by the government. According to Spain's Finance Minister, "Spain faces its deepest recession in half a century".

=== Germany ===
In Germany officials had warned the economy could contract by as much as 1.5 percent in the second quarter because of declining export orders. The economy of Germany indeed contracted in both the second and third quarters putting Germany now in a technical recession. Although the idea was fought for a moment Angela Merkel and the German government approved a €50 billion strong rescue plan to protect the German economy of the crisis, making of it Western Europe's biggest rescue plan for now in this crisis.

Germany's industrial output was down 2.4 percent in May, the fastest rate for a decade. Orders have now fallen for six months in a row, the worst run since the early 1990s. The German Chamber of Industry and Commerce warned of up to 200,000 job losses in coming months. German retails sales fell 1.4 percent in June more than any expectations. The German economy declined by 0.5 percent in the second quarter.

=== Greece ===
In 2012 Greece entered its 5th year of recession. In 2011 Greece's GDP shrunk by a further 6.8%, leaving total economic output now 16% below the pre-crisis peak. Eurostat's current forecasts also show Greece's economy declining further in 2012, by an estimated 4.4%

=== Italy ===
In Italy, Fiat announced plant closures and temporary layoffs at factories in Turin, Melfi and Sicily. Car sales in Italy have fallen by almost 20 percent over each of the past two months. Italy's car workers' union said; "The situation is evidently more serious than had been understood." On 10 July 2008 economic think tank ISAE lowered its growth forecast for Italy to 0.4 percent from 0.5 percent and cut the 2009 outlook to 0.7 percent from 1.2 percent. Analysts have predicted Italy had entered a recession in the second quarter or would enter one by the end of the year with business confidence at its lowest levels since the 11 September attacks. Italy's economy contracted by 0.3 percent in the second quarter of 2008.

The unemployment rate rose from 5.7% in April 2007 to 8.6% in April 2010. Italy was mostly isolated from the effects of the Great Recession of 2008–2009 as their banking system did not engage in risky investment behavior and was sound. However, the effects of the recession wiped out the strict budget discipline that Italy had painstakingly kept since the Debt Crisis of 1992, and lead to another Italian sovereign debt crisis in 2011. Italy briefly saw growth from 2009 to 2011, but from 2011 to 2013 suffered a recession that, while shallower than the 2008–2009 downturn, was longer and in many ways far worse, as unemployment skyrocketed 7.9% in April 2011 to 13.0% in November 2014.

=== France and the Benelux countries ===
Other eurozone members saw a decline in their economies in the second quarter as well; France by 0.3 percent, Finland by 0.2 percent while the Netherlands showed zero growth in the second quarter. However the final estimates released by the INSEE, France's statistical agency, showed the French economy grew by 0.14 percent during the third quarter thus barely avoiding a technical recession. In the first quarter of 2009, France fell into recession, the last developed nation in Europe to do so.

In order to fight the economic crisis, French president Nicolas Sarkozy announced a €26 billion rescue plan which will amount to an additional €15.5 billion in addition to the normal budget for 2009 and will increase France's public deficit to 4%. It is similar, to an extent, to Barack Obama's proposal to stimulate the U.S. economy by investing in the nation's vital infrastructure. Further proposals include tax rebates for small businesses as well as easing restrictions on building permits and government contracts particularly with construction and civil engineering.

This is due to the "prime à la casse" program where buyers received a rebate of up to €1,000 for scrapping their polluting old vehicles and purchasing new environmentally friendly/ fuel efficient cars. As a consequence, car sales in France in December 2008 were 30% higher than in December 2007 although on the total 2008 year the sales was down 0.7%. Because the French new cars market fared better than most as well as increased sales in South America, French brands, particularly Renault, now have bigger shares of the world's market despite selling fewer cars in 2008 than in 2007. Another highly exposed industry is naval construction, an order concerning a packet boat for NCL was already cancelled.

In order to fill the blank in the construction planning the French government is expected to order soon a third Mistral BPC, as well as smaller ships, for the French navy to DCNS. This is part of the Sarkozy's rescue plan. DCNS also won its biggest export contract ever when the Brazilian government placed a €7 billion large order to the company. The order concerns four Scorpène-class submarines with a conventional propulsion and a fifth one with a nuclear propulsion, as well as a naval shipyard and a naval base.

The French cooperative bank Caisse d'Epargne suffered a €600 million derivatives trading loss in October 2008, which it blamed partly on the high market volatility at the time. The group of employees responsible for making the unauthorised trades were dismissed. French banks have also been affected to some point by the fraud set by Bernard Madoff. Most importantly Natixis, an investment bank, potentially lost €450 million in the process and BNP Paribas could lose €350 million. Neither Natixis or BNP Paribas directly invested in Madoff's but through bonds issued by the US treasury they could face such loses. It is to be determined if all of these are effectively lost, which ones can be recovered and what can be saved by legal procedures. Other groups like AXA, Société Générale, Crédit Agricole and Groupama could also face loses to some point.

On 28 September 2008, Dutch-Belgian bank Fortis was partially nationalized with a cash infusion from the Benelux countries amounting to €11.2 billion. Fortis' troubles started in the beginning of the year with an announcement that it faced around $1.5bn of losses in the American sub-prime catastrophe. In June, the company announced a selloff of assets to raise €5 bn to improve the liquidity of the organisation. This, however, proved insufficient. On 6 October 2008, it was announced the French bank BNP Paribas would take over 75 percent of Fortis' activities in Belgium, and 66 percent in Luxembourg, in exchange for the Belgian government becoming the new group's major shareholder.

However the Belgian government was accused of pressuring shareholders and collapsed over the controversy thus delaying the operation. A new proposition was made on 30 January 2009 with slightly different terms. BNP Paribas would take over 75% of Fortis' banking activities in Belgium and only 10% of the insurance activities in return of what the Belgian government would take 11.7% of BNP Paribas. This agreement would come with a warranty from the Belgian government that it would cover up to €5 billion if more toxic assets were to be discovered. On 30 September 2008 the Belgian, French and Luxembourg governments said they would invest €6.4bn into keeping Dexia, Belgium's second largest bank, afloat.

In May 2008 industrial output fell in the Netherlands by 6 percent.

On 19 March 2009, the INSEE announced worse contraction than previously said, predicting a −2.9% set back in growth, and a jobless rate up to 8.8 as soon as June 2009.

=== Portugal ===
In the summer of 2010, Moody's Investors Service cut Portugal's sovereign bond rating down two notches from an Aa2 to an A1. Due to spending on economic stimuli, Portugal's debt had increased sharply compared to the gross domestic product. Moody noted that the rising debt would weigh heavily on the government's short-term finances. Earlier in the year, Portugal was one of the countries identified in the European sovereign-debt crisis as concern spread over increasing government deficit and debt levels in certain countries.

Also in 2010, the country reached a record high unemployment rate of nearly 11%, a figure not seen for over two decades, while the number of public servants remained very high.

International financial markets compelled the Portuguese Government led by Prime Minister José Sócrates, to make radical changes in economic policy, like other European governments had done before. Thus, in September 2010, the Portuguese Government announced a fresh austerity package following other Eurozone partners, through a series of tax hikes and salary cuts for public servants. In 2009, the deficit had been 9.4 percent, one of the highest in the Eurozone and way above the European Union's Stability and Growth Pact three percent limit.

In November 2010, risk premiums on Portuguese bonds hit euro lifetime highs as investors and creditors worried that the country would fail to reign in its budget deficit and debt. The yield on the country's 10-year government bonds reached 7 percent – a level the Portuguese Finance Minister Fernando Teixeira dos Santos had previously said would require the country to seek financial help from international institutions.

A report published in January 2011 by the Diário de Notícias, a leading Portuguese newspaper, demonstrated that in the period between the Carnation Revolution in 1974 and 2010, the democratic Portuguese Republic governments had encouraged over expenditure and investment bubbles through unclear public-private partnerships. This had funded numerous ineffective and unnecessary external consultancy and advising committees and firms, allowed considerable slippage in state-managed public works, inflated top management and head officers' bonuses and wages, causing a persistent and lasting recruitment policy that has boosted the number of redundant public servants. The economy has also been damaged by risky credit, public debt creation and mismanaged European structural and cohesion funds for almost four decades. Apparently, the Prime Minister Sócrates's cabinet was not able to forecast or prevent any of this when symptoms first appeared in 2005, and later was incapable of doing anything to ameliorate the situation when the country was on the verge of bankruptcy in 2011.

On 23 March 2011, José Sócrates resigned following passage of a no confidence motion sponsored by all five opposition parties in parliament over spending cuts and tax increases.

On 6 April 2011, the resigning Prime Minister announced on the television that the country, facing a status of bankruptcy, would request financial assistance to the IMF (at the time managed by Dominique Strauss-Kahn) and the European Financial Stability Facility, like Greece and the Republic of Ireland had done before.

In order to accomplish the European Union/IMF-led rescue plan for Portugal's sovereign debt crisis, in July and August 2011, the new government led by Pedro Passos Coelho announced it was going to cut on state spending and increase austerity measures, including public servant wage cuts and additional tax increases.

== Rest of Europe ==
The entire economy of the European Union declined by 0.1 percent in the second quarter of 2008. A European Commission forecast predicted Germany, Spain and the UK would all enter a recession by the end of the year while France and Italy would have flat growth in the third quarter following second quarter contractions.

=== Denmark ===
Denmark showed a contraction of 0.6 percent in the first quarter of 2008 following a contraction of 0.2 percent in the fourth quarter of 2007. Revised data for Denmark, however cancelled the early recession, as GDP ended at +1.0% in Q4 2007 followed by −1.4% in Q1 2008 and +1.5% in Q2 2008. So according to revised data, the Great Recession only started in Denmark in Q3 2008.

=== Latvia ===
Latvia's gross domestic product fell 0.2 percent in the second quarter following a fall of 0.3 percent in the first quarter.

=== Switzerland ===
Economists at Switzerland's second-largest bank predicted a recession in 2009.

=== Estonia ===
Estonia saw an economic contraction of 0.9 percent in the second quarter of 2008, following a 0.5 percent contraction in the first quarter, but with the revised data showing no recession before Q3 2008.

Chairwoman of the Association of Estonian Food Industry, Sirje Potisepp, warned the Estonian food industry would probably face bankruptcies citing two major beverage companies in Estonia filing for bankruptcy.

=== Slovakia ===
Slovakia was one of only a few countries that retained their high GDP predictions for the year 2008.

=== Poland ===
Poland is the only member of the European Union to have avoided recession, meaning that in 2009 Poland created the most GDP growth in the EU. In 2010, the Polish economy registered a 3.2% annual rate of growth, exceeding the previous forecast of 2.7 per cent, and outperforming the EU average of 1 per cent. Poland had one of the lowest external debt rates in the European Union, at just over PLN 776.8 billion (€179.1 billion), 54.9% of its GDP.

=== Iceland ===
The Icelandic króna has declined 40% against the euro during 2008 and has experienced inflation of 14%. Iceland's interest rates have been raised to 15.5% to deal with the high inflation. This loss of currency value has put pressure on banks in Iceland, which are largely dependent on foreign debt. On 29 September 2008 Iceland's Glitnir was effectively nationalized after the Icelandic government acquired 75% of the bank's stock. According to the government the bank "would have ceased to exist" within a few weeks if there had not been intervention.

Iceland's Prime Minister Geir Haarde in a television address on 6 October 2008 said credit lines to Icelandic banks had been cut off and that "the Icelandic economy, in the worst case, could be sucked with the banks into the whirlpool and the result could be national bankruptcy" and that the government was looking to other countries for sources of liquidity. Iceland's Althing responded to the crisis by approving a bill giving the Government wide-ranging powers over the banks, including the ability to seize their assets, force them to merge or compel them to sell off their overseas subsidiaries. The parliament went on to seize control and nationalize Iceland's second largest bank, Landsbanki, on 8 October 2008. The Parliament also extended a £400m loan to the nation's largest bank, Kaupthing, in hopes that it would strengthen the institution's balance sheet.

On 8 October 2008 UK Prime Minister Gordon Brown announced that the UK government would launch legal action against Iceland, whose government announced that they had no intention of compensating any of the estimated 300,000 UK savers after the nationalization of Landsbanki and its online brand, Icesave. Chancellor of the Exchequer Alistair Darling announced that the UK government would foot the entire bill, estimated at £4bn, and that he was taking steps to freeze the assets of Landsbanki. The following day, Darling used the Anti-Terrorism, Crime and Security Act 2001 as the basis for seizing the assets of Landsbanki Islands hf, an Iceland-based bank. Icelanders launched an on-line petition drive to protest this action, which is seen as comparing Icelandic banks with Al-Qaida.

Iceland's GDP is expected by economists to shrink at least 10 percent as a result of the crisis, putting Iceland by some measure in an economic depression.

=== Hungary ===
On 10 October 2008, the Forint dropped by 10%. The European Central Bank (ECB) announced on 16 October that it was bailing out Hungary with a 5 billion euro (US$6.7 billion) loan facility, just days after the Hungarian Finance Ministry said it was seeking consultations with the International Monetary Fund (IMF) about a possible support package. The ECB's unprecedented move in bailing out a non-euro state underlines the crisis unraveling in Hungary and its possible impact on the rest of Central Europe. Several players will be affected, but at particular risk are the Austrian banks which invested so heavily in the region. A potential serious hiccup of the Austrian banks could mark a significant blow to Europe's already troubled banking system.

Hungary, which joined the European Union in 2004, has been hit hard by the current financial crisis due to its heavy dependence on foreign capital to finance its economy and has one of the biggest public deficits in the EU. Prior to the international bailout, the government had feared the worst, including a collapse of the national currency, Prime Minister Ferenc Gyurcsány said.

In November Hungary has received a $25 billion cash injection from the International Monetary Fund to save it from financial collapse. In December, the IMF transferred $5 billion and the ECB $2 billion.

=== Bulgaria ===
On 10 June 2009 Bulgarian authorities declared the country was officially in recession with its economy shrinking 4.2 percent from January to June. The Bulgarian economy contracted by 4.8 percent year-on-year in the second quarter for the first time in 12 years. Unemployment is rising rapidly. The agriculture sector registered a 6.6-percent decline in activity in the second quarter of 2009 compared to the same period last year, while industry shrank by 9.8 percent. The services sector meanwhile grew by 0.3 percent. Bulgaria's imports during the first half of this year compared to January–June 2008 contracted by 24.2 percent and exports declined by 18.2 percent.

=== United Kingdom ===
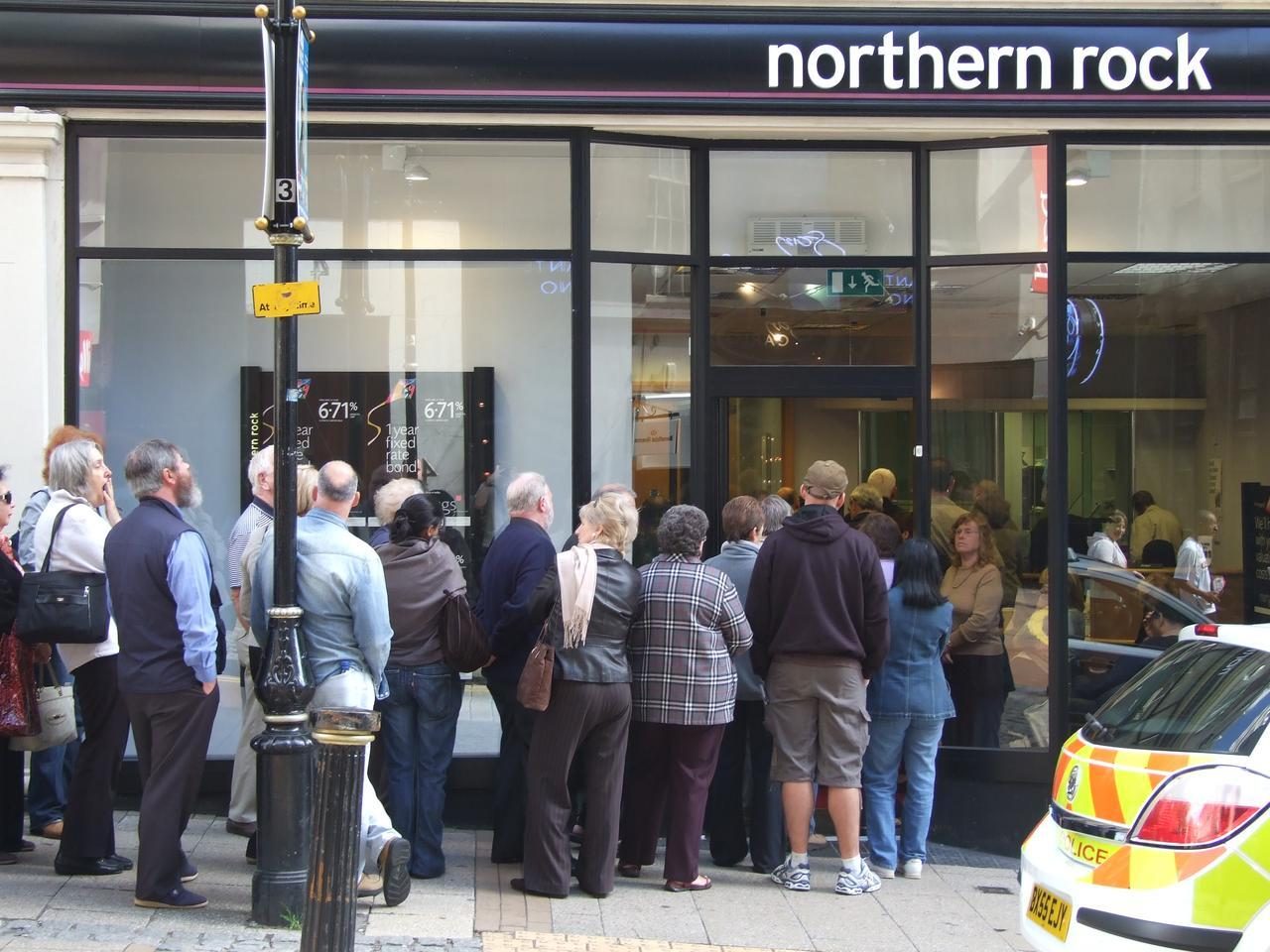
People queuing on 15 September 2007 outside a Northern Rock bank branch in the United Kingdom, to withdraw money from their accounts

The economy of the United Kingdom has also been hit by rising oil prices and the credit crisis. Sir Win Bischoff, chairman of Citigroup, spoke of his belief that house prices in Britain would fall constantly for two years from the end of 2007. The Ernst & Young Item club predicted growth of only 1.5 percent in 2008, slowing to 1 percent in 2009. They also predicted consumer spending would slow to only 0.2 percent, and forecast a two-year drop in investment. The Institute of Directors’ quarterly business opinion survey showed business optimism at its lowest level since the survey began in 1996.

Deputy Governor of the Bank of England, John Gieve, said inflation would accelerate "well over" 4 percent while economic growth is "slowing fast". Bank of England Governor Mervyn King said there may be "an odd quarter or two of negative growth", following the first quarter of 2009. Gieve said he couldn't rule out the UK economy heading into a recession, adding the economy was "quite a long way" from the end of the slowdown.

Nationwide, the UK's biggest building society, warned the UK could head into a recession after house prices in July 2008 fell 8.1 percent from the previous year. Housing prices declined by 1.7 percent in July, double the decline recorded in June. Standard & Poor's said on 30 July 2008 that 70,000 homeowners were in negative equity and it could rise to 1.7 million or about one in six homeowners in the UK based on an expected 17 percent decline into 2009. The Bank of England reported that mortgage approvals fell by a record of nearly 70 percent.

In Northern Ireland, house sales saw a fall of some 50 per cent according to a survey by the University of Ulster/Bank of Ireland and housing prices fell on average by 4 percent. British manufacturing activity declined by the most in almost a decade in July, the third consecutive month of declines.

The number of companies that went into administration in May–July 2008 was 938, an increase of 60 percent compared with the same period in 2007. The number of company liquidations in the second quarter of 2008 rose to 3,689, a 16 percent increase and the highest quarterly figure in five years. House builders expected the number of houses built in 2008 in England and Wales to be the lowest since 1924. The declines were seen as an indication the United Kingdom had a high chance of entering a recession. Factory production in the UK dropped 0.5 percent in June 2008 when twelve out of 13 categories of factory production fell. The economic output of the UK was reported to have increased by just 0.2 percent in the second quarter 2008, the joint-slowest pace since 2001.

The value of sterling relative to other currencies dropped by around 30%.

The Office for National Statistics later gave a revised number saying growth in the British economy was at zero, the worst since the second quarter of 1992. The current slowdown has ended 16 years of continuous economic growth, the longest period of economic expansion in Britain since the 19th century. A report from the National Institute for Economic and Social Research said the economy contracted by 0.1 percent in the period from May to July 2008 and 0.2 percent from June to August 2008.

A voter backlash due to the personal financial effects of the global credit crunch was widely attributed by politicians of the United Kingdom Labour Party, which had been in power since 1997, as the reason their political fortunes took a dramatic downturn through May 2008, with a succession of defeats in by-elections and the London Mayoral election, and the worst opinion poll result in their history. Political opponents countered this apparent excuse by pointing to the fact that the incumbent Prime Minister Gordon Brown, who had taken office in June 2007 just before the crisis broke, had been the country's 'Iron Chancellor', and had allegedly not ensured the country had sufficient monetary reserves to be able to lower taxes and ease the burden on voters, despite overseeing one of the longest sustained periods of economic growth in the country's history. In August 2008 the party also faced calls to impose a windfall tax on the utility companies, who were reaping record profits due to the fuel crisis, perceived as in bad taste given rising food and fuel prices.

On 17 September 2008, news emerged that the banking and insurance group HBOS (Halifax Bank of Scotland) was in merger talks with Lloyds TSB about creating a UK retail banking giant worth £30bn. The move received the backing of the British government which stated that it will over-rule any claims from the competition authorities.

According to the Office for National Statistics unemployment claims in August 2008 increased by 32,500 to reach 904,900. The wider Labour Force Survey measure found joblessness rose by 81,000 to 1.72 million between May and July, the largest increase since 1999.

In September 2008, British bank Bradford & Bingley's £20 billion savings business was acquired by Spanish bank Grupo Santander. While its retail deposit business along with its branch network will be sold to Santander. The mortgage book, personal loan book, headquarters, treasury assets and its wholesale liabilities will be taken into public ownership.

From 1 December 2008, the UK Government made the decision to cut VAT from 17.5% to 15% for 13 months in an attempt to encourage a big spend from UK shoppers before Christmas, and again in the run-up to Christmas 2009.

On 4 December 2008, the Bank of England cut interest rates from 3% to 2%, which amounted to the lowest level since 1951.

On 8 January 2009, the Bank of England reduced rates even further, from 2% to 1.5%, the lowest level in its 315-year history.

On 23 January 2009, Government figures from the Office for National Statistics showed that the UK was officially in recession for the first time since 1991; with a 1.5% fall in gross domestic product during the final quarter of 2008 being the sharpest for 28 years.

On 5 February 2009 interest rates were cut further from 1.5% to 1%.

A February 2009 research on the main British insurers showed that most of them are not considering officially raising insurance premiums for the year 2009, in spite of the 20% raise predictions made by The Daily Telegraph or The Daily Mirror. However, it is expected that the capital liquidity will become an issue and determine increases, having their capital tied up in investments yielding smaller dividends, corroborated with the £644 million underwriting losses suffered in 2007.

On 5 March 2009, the Bank of England cut interest rates yet again, from 1% to 0.5%. The same week, it announced that it would begin a policy of quantitative easing, printing up to £150 billion of new money.

Figures published in March 2009 by the Bank of England revealed that over $1 trillion in foreign holdings had been withdrawn from UK banks between spring and the end of 2008, representing a huge loss of confidence in UK financial institutions.

By November 2008, unemployment had risen to over 1.8 million (compared to less than 1.7 million at the start of the year and less than 1.5 million as recently as 2005) and by early 2009 had exceeded 2 million, the highest since 1996. It was feared that unemployment could reach 3 million during 2010 – a level not seen since the 1980s. However, the end of the recession in the United Kingdom was declared on 26 January 2010, by which time unemployment stood at nearly 2.5 million. A peak of almost 2.7 million was reached in late 2011.

A report by the ONS produced in March 2009 stated that the UK economy shrank by 1.6 percent during the last quarter of 2008, with a 1% drop in household spending. A further decline of up to 4% GDP during 2009 was predicted.

In April 2009, it was reported that first quarter GDP had shrunk by 1.9 percent, with a prediction of a 4.1 percent drop for the year. The largest contributor to this figure was manufacturing output, which fell by 6.9 percent over the quarter.

In May 2009, Standard & Poor's cut its rating outlook for the UK to negative. Official figures also showed that British public borrowing hit a record high for the month of April, the first month of the new tax year – net public borrowing came in at £8.5bn in April 2009, compared to April 2008's figure of £1.8bn

In June 2009, the figure for the first quarter GDP drop was revised downwards from 1.9 to 2.4 percent, with economic output falling 4.1% from the previous year. Revised figures also showed that the recession began in Q2 of 2008, rather than Q3 of 2008 as previously reported.

In the 3 months to May 2009, the unemployment rate showed a record quarterly rise of 281,000 to stand at 2.38 million – which represented 7.6% of the working population. In the three months to June, the number of job vacancies fell to a record low of 429,000, down by 35,000 from the previous quarter.

By the end of June 2009, the public sector debt stood at £798.8 billion, equivalent to 56.6% of GDP, the highest percentage since records began in 1974. This compared to £641.4 billion or 44.4% of GDP in June 2008. The figure is expected to rise still higher when the costs of bailing out RBS and Lloyds Bank are added.

By August 2009, UK unemployment stood at more than 2.4 million, the highest since 1995. The Bank of England announced that due to the deepening recession in the UK, it would be extending its quantitative easing program to a new total of £175 billion. In November 2009, The Bank of England announced it would be adding a further £25 billion in continuation of quantitative easing in assisting the UK economy through the recession.

In December 2009, it was revealed that the UK's unemployment total stood at almost 2.5 million – another monthly rise and the highest level for 15 years – but the number of people claiming unemployment benefit had actually fallen by more than 6,000. By this stage, the UK was one of the last major economies still in recession. However, on 26 February 2010 it was revealed that the UK economy had grown by 0.3% within the last quarter of 2009 and the UK was out of recession.

However, many economists were still unsure of the situation – the relatively small drop in unemployment benefit claimants could be attributed to seasonal jobs, and with a general election imminent, the government had every reason to present the best economic picture possible. Other factors which could have produced an artificially high growth rate included the end of the "cash-for-clunkers" car replacement scheme, and the ending of a VAT cut from 15% to 17.5% in January causing many consumers to push forward their purchases. In addition, £200 billion had been pumped into the economy via QE, and the central bank rate had been held at almost 0% for most of the year. Thus although official figures showed that the UK had indeed exited recession fears of a double-dip recession remained. According to the IMF, the UK economy had grown slower than that of Portugal or Italy in 2010.

The popularity of Britain's Labour government, led by prime minister Gordon Brown since June 2007, slumped dramatically during 2008 and 2009, with low rankings in opinion polls, dismal performances in local and European elections, and losing several seats in parliamentary by-elections. The Conservative opposition, led by David Cameron, won the most votes and seats in the 2010 general election, but fell short of an overall majority, and agreed a coalition with the Liberal Democrats in order to form a new government. The new government faced numerous economic challenges, namely re-establishing economic growth, reducing the national deficit and reducing unemployment, not to mention a host of social problems, many of which had been intensified as a result of the recession.

=== Romania ===
Despite high economic growth in 2008 (8.7%), Romania was affected very hard by the crisis, analysts forecasting a contraction of 8–9% for 2009, as the new government established in the late 2008 was unable to take any anti-crisis measures.

Romania's economy has been one of the hardest hit in Europe. The country's trade deficit fell by more than 60 percent during the first half of 2009, but not because of exports taking off, but due to business bankruptcies and unemployment decreasing consumption.

=== Russia ===
From 1999 until the autumn of 2008 Russia's economy grew at a steady pace, which most experts attributed to Putin's policies, a sharp rouble devaluation of 1998, Boris Yeltsin-era structural reforms, rising oil price and cheap credit from western banks. After Vladimir Putin's first term as president (during most of which Mikhail Kasyanov held prime-ministership), some analysts described Russia's short-term economic growth as impressive and maintained that Putin was "at least partially responsible for it": a series of fundamental reforms had been implemented, including a flat income tax of 13 percent, a reduced profits tax, and new land and legal codes.

In October 2008, Russia emerged as one of the countries hardest-hit by the global economic crisis, the stock market crash having been precipitated by Vladimir Putin's verbal attack on Mechel in July that year and the Russo-Georgian War in August.

In 2008, Russia's benchmark RTS share index lost 72.4 percent, ranking it as an unusual performer of all major emerging markets.

In January 2009, Russia's State Statistics Service released data, according to which the Russian industrial production slumped in December 2008 by 10.3 percent after falling 8.7 percent in November that year.

However, the Russian main stock exchange index has doubled by autumn 2009, compared to the end 2008, and, by the end of 2009, has almost reached the pre-crisis levels.

=== Sweden ===
Sweden has not been severely affected, and no banks or financial institutions have had real trouble. However, some effects have been visible, mostly based on distrust and similar psychological mechanisms. The stockmarket has declined heavily, because of influence from New York and other markets. Some banks, especially Swedbank had invested heavily in US housing bonds.

The banks did not trust each other well and the difference between the interbank interest rate and the state interest rate has gone up at least 1%. The housing loan interest rates have gone up even further. The global sales especially of cars has gone down, forcing the Swedish car industry to lay off staff and contractors. The increased fear of enduring recession and the increased financing costs have lowered company investments and private consumption.

Sweden entered recession after a two consecutive quarter of economic contraction. Sweden's economy showed zero growth in the second quarter of 2008. The Swedish GDP contracted by 0,1% during both the second and third quarters of 2008. Sweden's economy sank into recession in the third quarter of 2008. In October retail sales dropped 0.6 percent in the month, and household consumption fell 0.2 percent in the third quarter. The Riksbank offered 60 billion kronor ($7.71 billion) in loans to financial firms at an auction, after having opened credit facilities to maintain the liquidity in the banking sector. At the beginning of December, the government launched a financial stability package to rev up the economy, while the central bank, urged by the OECD, cut down its interest rates to 2%

=== Ukraine ===
Ratings agency Fitch warned Ukraine could be headed for a currency crisis as economic fundamentals deteriorate and the country enters another period of political uncertainty. Fitch said the current account deficit was likely to widen further as prices of gas imports rise and prices of its steel exports fall and said Ukraine was likely to need to borrow more at a time when global debt markets have ground to a virtual standstill. Ukraine's central bank chief, Petro Poroshenko, said he saw no need to intervene to protect the currency.

Ukraine was hit heavy by the economic crisis of 2008, analysts say the plights of Ukraine are slumping steel prices, local banking problems and the cutting of Russian gas supply in January 2009. Key industries such as metallurgy and machine building are laying off workers, and real wages have started to fall for the first time in a decade.

=== Norway ===
The Norwegian government pension fund suffered an investment loss of $92 billion during 2008. However, the overall value of the fund rose due to oil sales and currency movements.

=== Croatia ===
With economic growth ceasing by the end in 2008, the Croatian economy entered a crisis that exposed numerous structural issues and unsustainable growth mechanisms, causing the period of instability to fester until as late as 2015.

The country was still in the midst of what was effectively a six-year long recession when it became a member of the European Union in July 2013.

The recession had contributed to the fall of the Cabinet of Ivo Sanader II and its replacement with the Cabinet of Jadranka Kosor. It was interrupted by a period of stagnation in 2011, that nevertheless led to the election of the Cabinet of Zoran Milanović, yet the economy soon returned to recession, in which it remained until the end of 2014.

== European Economic Recovery Plan ==
In November 2008, the European Commission presented the European Economic Recovery Plan, a plan of 200 billion euros (1.2% of GDP) to fight against the consequences of the economic crisis in the European Union. In reality, the plan is a series of national measures to be implemented by each government, without much coherency between the policies. The measures included incentives to investment, tax cuts and social measures.

=== Electromobility ===
Electrification of transport (electromobility) figures prominently in the Green Car Initiative (GCI), included in the European Economic Recovery Plan. DG TREN is supporting a large European "electromobility" project on electric vehicles and related infrastructure with a total budget of around €50million as part of the Green Car Initiative.

== See also ==
- Euro area crisis
- Economic history of Europe (1000 AD–present)
- 1991 Indian economic crisis
- Stock market crashes in India
- 2012 European general strike
- German economic crisis (2022–present)
- List of stock market crashes and bear markets
