= List of transfers of La Liga – 2007–08 season =

This is a list of Spanish football transfers for the 2007–08 La Liga season. Transfers are only allowed in limited transfer windows in summer and winter.

== Winter window ==
The 2008 winter window opened 31 December and closed 31 January.

=== Sevilla ===
In:

Out:

- (Russia) Aleksandr Kerzhakov – To Dynamo Moscow (£5m)
- (Portugal) Ariza Makukula – To Benfica (£2m)

== Summer window ==
The 2007 summer window opened 1 July and closed 31 August.

Date	Player Nationality	Player name	Playing Position(/s)	Moving from	Moving to	Fee
1 July 2007	(England)	David Beckham	RM	Real Madrid	LA Galaxy	Free
26 April 2007	(England)	Jonathan Woodgate	CB	Real Madrid	Middlesbrough	£7m
19 June 2007	(Brazil)	Roberto Carlos	LWB	Real Madrid	Fenerbahçe	Free
13 July 2007	(Spain)	Raúl Bravo	LB/LCB	Real Madrid	Olympiacos	€2.3m(£1.6m)
18 July 2007	(Spain)	Francisco Pavón	CB	Real Madrid	Real Zaragoza	Free
10 July 2007	(Portugal) (Brazil)	Pepe	CB	Porto	Real Madrid	€30m(£20.3m)
12 July 2007	(Poland)	Jerzy Dudek	GK	Liverpool	Real Madrid	Free
27 June 2007	(Netherlands)	Giovanni Van Bronckhorst	LB/LCDM	Barcelona	Feyenoord	Free
10 July 2007	(Argentina)	Javier Saviola	RCF	Barcelona	Real Madrid	Free
25 June 2007	(France)	Thierry Henry	LCF	Arsenal	Barcelona	£16m
29 June 2007	(France)	Eric Abidal	LWB	Lyon	Barcelona	€15m
7 July 2007	(Spain)	Kepa Blanco	ST	Sevilla	Getafe	€3.5m
30 June 2007	(Italy)	Francesco Tavano	ST	Valencia	Livorno Calcio	€6m
7 February 2007; 17 July 2007	(Argentina)	Roberto Ayala	CB	Valencia; Villarreal	Villarreal; Real Zaragoza	Free €6m
22 June 2007	(Spain)	Javier Arizmendi	ST	Deportivo	Valencia	Undisclosed
4 July 2007	(Germany)	Timo Hildebrand	GK	Stuttgart	Valencia	Free
	(Spain)	Alexis (footballer, born 1985)	CB	Getafe	Valencia	
February 2007	(Uruguay)	Martín Cáceres	CB	Defensor	Villarreal	Free
25 June 2007	(Spain)	Joan Capdevila	LWB	Deportivo	Villarreal	
1 July 2007	(Spain)	Diego Lopez	GK	Real Madrid	Villarreal	€6m
4 July 2007	(France)	Rio Mavuba	CDM	Bordeaux	Villarreal	€7m
3 July 2007	(Brazil)	Cleber Santana	CAM/RAM	Santos	Atlético Madrid	
4 July 2007	(Spain)	Fernando Torres	ST	Atlético Madrid	Liverpool	£20 million
6 June 2007	(Uruguay)	Carlos Diogo	RWB	Real Madrid	Real Zaragoza	€4.5m
18 July 2007	(Brazil)	Francelino Matuzalem	AM	Shakhtar Donetsk	Real Zaragoza	Undisclosed
7 July 2007	(Portugal)	Jorge Andrade	CB	Deportivo	Juventus	€10m
10 July 2007	(Argentina)	German Lux	GK	River Plate	Real Mallorca	Free
3 July 2007	(Netherlands)	Daniël de Ridder	W/AM	Celta Vigo	Birmingham City	Free
10 July 2007	(Argentina)	Maxi Lopez (Barcelona)	ST	Real Mallorca (loaned)	FC Moscow	€2m
12 July 2007	(Netherlands)	Khalid Boulahrouz	RCB/RB	Chelsea	Sevilla	Loaned(1 yr)
12 July 2007	(France)	Ludovic Butelle	GK	Valencia	Real Valladolid	Loaned(1 yr)
14 July 2007	(Brazil)	Ricardo Oliveira	ST	Milan	Real Zaragoza	Loaned(1 yr)
17 July 2007	(Brazil)	Éwerthon	FW/AM	Real Zaragoza	Stuttgart	Loaned(1 yr)
16 July 2007	(Spain)	Mikel Alonso	M	Real Sociedad	Bolton	Loaned (1 yr)
1 July 2007	(Brazil)	Júlio Baptista	LCAM/ST	Arsenal	Real Madrid	Loan return
	(Portugal)	Marco Caneira	DF	Sporting Clube de Portugal	Valencia	Loan return
