= Manuel Jove =

Spanish businessperson (1941–2020)

- Born: Manuel Jove Capellán; 21 June 1941; A Coruña, Galicia, Spain
- Died: 7 May 2020 (aged 78); A Coruña
- Occupation: Property developer
- Known for: Founder, Fadesa
- Children: 2

Manuel Jove Capellán (21 June 1941 - 7 May 2020) was a Spanish billionaire, and the founder of property development company Fadesa.

Jove was born in June 1941.

He was married, with two children, and lived in A Coruña, Spain.

Jove died on 7 May 2020, in A Coruña.
