= Economic history of Europe (1000 AD – present) =

Real GDP per capita development in Europe, 1820 to 2018

This article covers the economic history of Europe from about 1000 AD to the present. For the context, see History of Europe.

== Middle Ages ==
=== Agriculture ===
Early in the first millennium, improvements in technique and technology began to emerge. Monasteries spread throughout Europe and became important centers for the collection of knowledge related to agriculture and forestry. The manorial system, which existed under different names throughout Europe and Asia, allowed large landowners significant control over both their land and its laborers, in the form of peasants or serfs. There were exchanges with distant regions mediated through the Arab world. Arabs introduced summer irrigation to Europe. Population continued to increase along with land use.

By 900 AD in Europe, developments in iron smelting allowed for increased production, leading to developments in the production of farm tools such as ploughs, hand tools and horse shoes. The plough was significantly improved, developing into the mouldboard plough, capable of turning over the heavy, wet soils of northern Europe. This led to the clearing of forests in that area and a significant increase in agricultural production, which in turn led to an increase in population. Farmers in Europe moved from a two field crop rotation to a three field crop rotation in which one field of three was left fallow every year. This resulted in increased productivity and nutrition, as the change in rotations led to different crops being planted, including legumes, such as peas, lentils and beans. Inventions such as improved horse harnesses and the whippletree also changed methods of cultivation.

Watermills were initially developed by the Romans, but were improved throughout the Middle Ages, along with windmills, and were provided the power needed to grind grains into flour, cut wood and process flax and wool, and irrigate fields.

Field crops included wheat, rye, barley and oats; they were used for bread and animal fodder. Peas, beans, and vetches became common from the 13th century onward as food and as a fodder crop for animals; they also had nitrogen-fixation fertilizing properties. Crop yields peaked in the 13th century, and stayed more or less steady until the 18th century. Although the limitations of medieval farming were once thought to have provided a ceiling for the population growth in the Middle Ages, recent studies have shown that the technology of medieval agriculture was always sufficient for the needs of the people under normal circumstances, and that it was only during exceptionally harsh times, such as the terrible weather of 1315–17, that the needs of the population could not be met.

=== Famines and plagues ===
There were episodes of famines, and also of deadly epidemics. Soil exhaustion, overpopulation, wars, diseases and climate change caused hundreds of famines in medieval Europe. Around 1300, centuries of European prosperity and growth came to a halt. Famines such as Great Famine of 1315–1317 slowly weakened the populace. Few people died of starvation because the weakest had already succumbed to a routine disease they otherwise would have survived. A plague like the Black Death killed its victims in one locality in a matter of days or even hours, reducing the population of some areas by half as many survivors fled. Kishlansky reports:

The Black Death touched every aspect of life, hastening a process of social, economic, and cultural transformation already underway.... Fields were abandoned, workplaces stood idle, international trade was suspended. Traditional bonds of kinship, village and even religion were broken and the horrors of death, flight, and failed expectations. "People cared no more for dead men that we care for dead goats," wrote one survivor.

Depopulation caused labor to become scarcer; the survivors were better paid and peasants could drop some of the burdens of feudalism. There was also social unrest; France and England experienced serious peasant risings: the Jacquerie, the Peasants' Revolt. These events have been called the Crisis of the Late Middle Ages.

=== Technology ===
A major technological advance came in long-distance navigation, from the 8th century to the 12th century. Viking raids and the Crusader invasions of the Middle East led to the diffusion of and refinement of technology instrumental to overseas travel. People made improvements in ships, particularly the longship. The astrolabe, for navigation, greatly aided long-distance travel over the seas. The improvements in travel in turn increased trade and the diffusion of consumer items.

=== Crafts and urban growth ===
From the 11th century to the 13th century, farmers and small-scale producers of crafts increasingly met in towns to trade their goods. They met in either seasonal trade fairs or they traded on an ongoing basis. Craft associations called guilds fostered the development of skills and the local growth of trade in particular goods. Over the course of the centuries of this period towns grew in size and number, first in a core in England, Flanders, France, Germany and northern Italy.

Spinning, weaving, sewing and cutting were considered women's work until the mid-12th century when men began taking over some positions with more sophisticated industrial structures and technologies. In the large cities of Northern France, centers of medieval textile production, the shift to male dominated production started even earlier, in the 11th century, when the vertical loom was replaced by the horizontal treadle loom. Especially the guilds of furriers, tailors, dyers and tapestry makers were dominated by men. Some women did participate in guilds, but it was rare. Most commercial roles were occupied by men, while women were preferred for positions within households. When women were accepted for guild membership it was usually as a second-rank member (similar to young boys or disabled men).

The economic system of this era was merchant capitalism. The core of this system was in merchant houses, backed by financiers acting as intermediaries between simple commodity producers. This system continued until it was supplanted by industrial capitalism in the 18th century.

Economic activity over a broad geographic range began to intensify in both northern and southern Europe in the 13th century.

Trade flourished in Italy (albeit not united, but rather ruled by different princes in different city-states), particularly by the 13th century. Leading the trade in Mediterranean Europe were traders from the port cities of Genoa and Venice. The wealth generated in Italy fueled the Italian Renaissance.

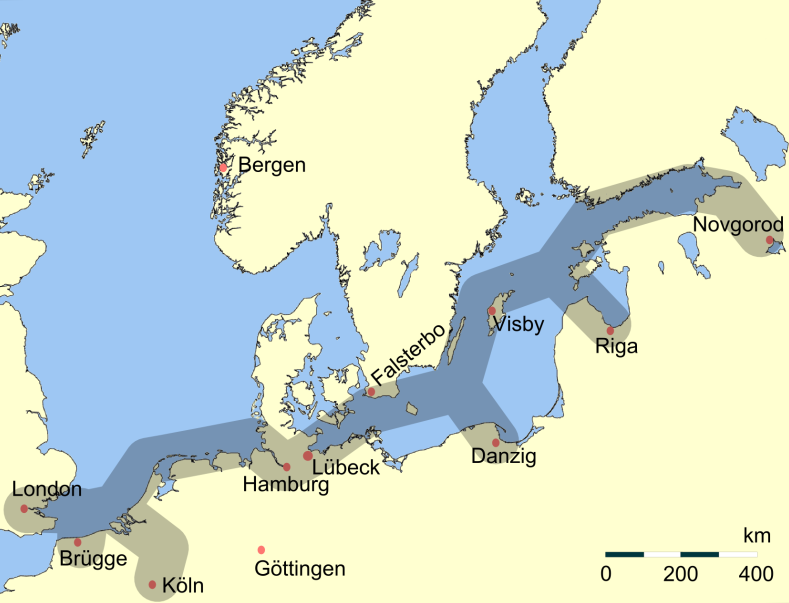
Main trading routes of the Hanseatic League

=== Hanseatic League ===
In cities linked to the North Sea and the Baltic Sea a trade monopoly developed in the Hanseatic League. This facilitated the growth of trade among cities in close proximity to these two seas. Long-distance trade in the Baltic intensified, as the major trading towns came together in the Hanseatic League, under the leadership of Lübeck.

The League was a business alliance of trading cities and their guilds that dominated trade along the coast of Northern Europe and flourished from the 1200 to 1500, and continued with lesser importance after that. The chief cities were Cologne on the Rhine River, Hamburg and Bremen on the North Sea, and Lübeck on the Baltic.

The Hanseatic cities each had its own legal system and a degree of political autonomy. The Hanseatic League was an alliance of North German and Baltic cities during the Middle Ages. The Hanseatic League was founded for the purpose of joining forces for promoting mercantile interests, defensive strength and political influence. By the 14th century, the Hanseatic League held a near-monopoly on trade in the Baltic, especially with Novgorod and Scandinavia.

=== France ===
The collapse of the Roman Empire unlinked the French economy from Europe. Town life and trade declined and society became based on the self-sufficient manor. Some international trade existed for luxury goods such as silk, papyrus, and silver; it was handled by foreign merchants such as the Radanites.

Agricultural output began to increase in the Carolingian age as a result of the arrival of new crops, improvements in agricultural production, and good weather conditions. However, this did not lead to the revival of urban life; in fact, urban activity further declined in the Carolingian era as a result of civil war, Arab raids, and Viking invasions. (See also Pirenne thesis). The High Middle Ages saw a continuation of the agricultural boom of the Carolingian age. In addition, urban life grew during this period; Paris expanded dramatically.

The 13 decades from 1335 to 1450 spawned a series of economic catastrophes, with bad harvests, famines, plagues and wars that overwhelmed four generations of Frenchmen. The population had expanded, making the food supply more precarious. The Black Death of 1347 was echoed by several smaller plagues at 15 year intervals. The French and English armies during the Hundred Years War marched back and forth across the land; they did not massacre civilians, but they drained the food supply, disrupted agriculture and trade, and left disease and famine in their wake. Royal authority weakened, as local nobles became strongmen fighting their neighbors for control of the local region. France's population plunged from 17 million, down to 12 million in 130 years. Finally, starting in the 1450s, a long cycle of recuperation began.

== Early modern Europe: 1500–1800 ==
The Age of Discovery, seen from the European point of view, introduced major economic changes. The Columbian exchange resulted in Europe adopting new crops, as well as shaking up traditional cultural ideas and practices. The commercial revolution continued, with Europeans developing mercantilism and European imports of luxury goods (notably spices and fine cloth) from eastern and southern Asia switching from crossing Islamic territory in the present-day Middle East to passing the Cape of Good Hope. Spain proved adept at plundering the gold and silver of the Americas, but incompetent at converting its new wealth into a vibrant domestic economy, and declined as an economic power. From the 1600s, the centres of commerce and manufactures shifted definitively from the Mediterranean to the centres of shipping and colonisation on the western Atlantic coastal fringe: economic activity went into a relative decline in 17th century Italy and Turkey - but to the advantage of Portugal, Spain, France, the Dutch Republic and England/Britain. In eastern Europe, Russia suppressed the Tatar slave-trade, expanded commerce in luxury furs from Siberia and rivalled the Scandinavian and German states in the Baltic. Colonial goods like sugar and tobacco from the Americas came to play a role in the European economy. Meanwhile, changes in financial practice (especially in the Netherlands and in England), the second agricultural revolution in Britain and technological innovations in France, Prussia and England not only promoted economic changes and expansion in themselves, but also fostered the beginnings of the Industrial Revolution.

=== France ===
Before 1800, France was the most populated country in Europe, with a population of 17 million in 1400, 20 million in the 17th century, and 28 million in 1789. The 17th and 18th centuries saw a steady increase in urban populations, although France remained a profoundly rural country, with less than 10% of the population located in urban areas. Paris was the largest city in Europe, in 1754, with 650,000 people by the end of the 18th century.

Agricultural production of a variety of food items expanded: olive oil, wine, cider, woad (a source of blue dye), and saffron. After 1500, New World crops appeared such as beans, corn (maize), squash, tomatoes, potatoes, and bell peppers. Production techniques remained attached to medieval traditions and produced low yields. With the rapidly expanding population, additional land suitable for farming became scarce. The situation worsened with repeated disastrous harvests in the 1550s.

The introduction of the high-temperature forge in northeast France led to mineral mining, although France had to import copper, bronze, tin, and lead. Mines and glasswork benefited greatly from royal tax exemptions for a period of about twenty years. Silk production (introduced in Tours in 1470 and in Lyon in 1536) enabled the French to join a thriving market, but French products remained of lesser quality than Italian silks. Wool production was widespread, as was the production of linen and of hemp (both major export products).

Lyon served as the center of France's banking and international trade markets. Market fairs occurred four times a year and facilitated the export of French goods (such as fabrics), and the import of Italian, German, Dutch, English goods. It also allowed the importation of exotic goods such as silks, alum, glass, wools, spices, dyes. Lyon also contained houses of most of Europe's banking families, including the Fuggers and the Medici. Regional markets and trade routes linked Lyon, Paris and Rouen to the rest of the country. Under King Francis I (reigned 1515–1547) and King Henry II (reigned 1547–1559), the relationships between French imports and exports to England and to Spain were in France's favor. Trade was roughly balanced with the Netherlands, but France continually ran a large trade deficit with Italy due to the latter's silks and exotic goods. In subsequent decades, English, Dutch and Flemish maritime activity would create competition with French trade, which would eventually displace the major markets to the northwest, leading to the decline of Lyon.

By the middle of the 16th century, France's demographic growth, its increased demand for consumer goods, and its rapid influx of gold and silver from Africa and the Americas led to inflation (grain became five times as expensive from 1520 to 1600), and wage stagnation. Although many land-owning peasants and enterprising merchants had been able to grow rich during the boom, the standard of living fell greatly for rural peasants, who were forced to deal with bad harvests at the same time. This led to reduced purchasing power and a decline in manufacturing. The monetary crisis led France to abandon (in 1577) the livre as its money of account, in favor of the écu in circulation, and banning most foreign currencies.

Meanwhile, France's military ventures in Italy and disastrous civil wars demanded huge sums of cash, which were raised with through the taille and other taxes. The taille, which was levied mainly on the peasantry, increased from 2.5 million livres in 1515 to 6 million after 1551, and by 1589 the taille had reached a record 21 million livres. Financial crises hit the royal household repeatedly, and so in 1523, Francis I established a government bond system in Paris, the "rentes sur l'Hôtel de Ville".

=== Great Britain ===
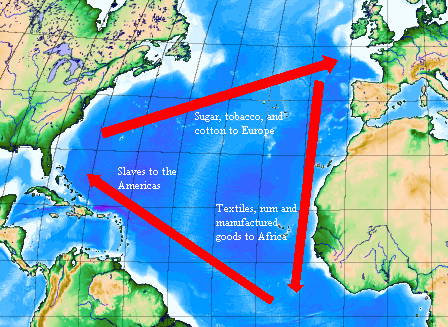
Mercantilism helped create trade patterns such as the triangular trade in the North Atlantic, in which raw materials were imported to the metropolis and then processed and redistributed to other colonies.

==== Mercantilism and empire ====
The basis of the British Empire was founded in the age of mercantilism, an economic theory that stressed maximizing the trade inside the empire, and trying to weaken rival empires. The modern or "second" British Empire was based upon the English Empire which first took shape in the early 18th century, with the English settlement of the Thirteen Colonies which in 1776 became the United States, as well as Canada's Maritime provinces, and the control of sugar plantation islands of the Caribbean, notably Trinidad and Tobago, the Bahamas, the Leeward Islands, Barbados, Jamaica and Bermuda. These islands, where slavery became the basis of the economy, comprised Britain's most lucrative colonies in terms of profits flowing to the absentee owners (who lived in Britain). The American colonies also utilized slave labour in the farming of tobacco, indigo and rice in the south. Britain's American empire was slowly expanded by war and colonization. Victory over the French during the Seven Years' War gave Britain control over what is now most of Canada.

Mercantilism was the basic policy imposed by Britain on its colonies. Mercantilism meant that the government and the merchants became partners with the goal of increasing political power and private wealth, to the exclusion of other empires. The government protected its merchants—and kept others out—by trade barriers, regulations, and subsidies to domestic industries in order to maximize exports from and minimize imports to the realm. The government had to fight smuggling—which became a favorite American technique in the 18th century to circumvent the restrictions on trading with the French, Spanish or Dutch. The goal of mercantilism was to run trade surpluses, so that gold and silver would pour into London. The government took its share through duties and taxes, with the remainder going to merchants in Britain. The government spent much of its revenue on a superb Royal Navy, which not only protected the British colonies but threatened the colonies of the other empires, and sometimes seized them. Thus the British Navy captured New Amsterdam (New York) in 1664. The colonies were captive markets for British industry, and the goal was to enrich the mother country.

== Industrial Revolution: 1750s–1840s ==
The Industrial Revolution brought factories to Europe, especially England and Scotland, 1750s to 1830s. France and the U.S. experienced its industrial revolution in the early 19th century; Germany in the 19th century; and to Russia in the early-mid 20th century.

In Britain, the Industrial Revolution was a period of economic transformation from the 1750s to the 1830s, characterized by the growth of a new system comprising factories, railroads, coal mining and business enterprises using new technologies that it sponsored. The new system operated first on textiles, then spread to other sectors and by the mid 19th century totally transformed the British economy and society, setting up sustained growth; it spread to parts of America and Europe and modernized the world economy. Although localized to certain parts of Britain (the London area was not included), its impact was felt worldwide on migration and trade, society and politics, on cities and countryside, and affected the remotest areas. The growth rate in the British GDP was 1.5% per year (1770–1815), doubling to 3.0% (1815–1831).

Success in building larger, more efficient steam engines after 1790 meant that the cost of energy fell steadily. Entrepreneurs found uses for stationary engines in turning the machines in a factory or the pumps at a mine, while mobile engines were put into locomotives and ships (where they turned paddles or, later, propellers). The use of water power was growing too, so that in 1830 steam mills and water mills were about equal (at 165,000 horsepower each); by 1879 Britain obtained 2.1 million horsepower from steam engines, and 230,000 from water.

During the early industrial revolution and the transition from an agricultural economy to an industrial one, major conflicts arose between agricultural landholders and capitalists. Landholders did not benefit as much as industrialists from educating their workers (and thus increasing the human capital of their region). Educated agricultural workers were not significantly more productive than uneducated ones, and moreover, "educated workers have more incentives to migrate to urban, industrial areas than their less educated counterparts." For that reason, less industrialized regions where large land owners held more political power than industrialists, tended to have less educated workers than industrialized ones. The unequal distribution of land therefore has a negative correlation with the development of human capital.

=== Belgium ===
No one expected that Belgium-seemingly a "sluggish" and "culturally dormant" bastion of traditionalism-would leap– to the forefront of the Industrial Revolution on the Continent. Nevertheless, Belgium was the second country, after Britain, in which the industrial revolution took place and it set the pace for all of continental Europe, while leaving the Netherlands behind.

Industrialization took place in Wallonia (French-speaking southern Belgium), starting in the middle of the 1820s, and especially after 1830. The availability of cheap coal was a main factor that attracted entrepreneurs. Numerous works comprising coke blast furnaces as well as puddling and rolling mills were built in the coal mining areas around Liège and Charleroi. The leader was a transplanted Englishman John Cockerill. His factories integrated all stages of production, from engineering to the supply of raw materials, as early as 1825. By 1830, when iron became important the Belgium coal industry had long been established, and used steam-engines for pumping. Coal was sold to local mills and railways as well as to France and Prussia. The textile industry, based on cotton and flax, employed about half of the industrial workforce for much of the industrial period. Ghent was the premier industrial city in Belgium until the 1880s, when the center of growth moved to Liège, with its steel industry.

Cheap and readily available coal attracted firms producing metals and glass, both of which required considerable amounts of coal, and so regions around coal fields became highly industrialised. The Sillon industriel (Industrial Valley), and in particular the Pays Noir around Charleroi, were the center of the steel industry until the 1940s.

=== Railways ===
The growth of industry soon brought to light the need for a better system of transportation. While canals and roads did improve, they were soon overshadowed by a means of transportation that held great promise: the railroads. The railroads may have been that most important factor of the industrial revolution. Railways had existed as early as 1500, but in 1700s the primitive wooden rails were replaced with wrought iron. These new rails enabled horses to pull even heavier loads with relative ease. But dependence on horsepower did not last for long. In 1804, the first steam-powered locomotive pulled 10 tons of ore and 70 people at 5 miles per hour. This new technology improved dramatically; locomotives soon reached speeds of 50 miles per hour. While the railroads revolutionized transportation, they further contributed to the growth of the industrial revolution by causing a great increase in the demand for iron and coal.

=== Iron and steel ===
Throughout the Middle Ages iron was smelted using charcoal, however in the eighteenth century, new methods of iron production were discovered; the resulting iron was of higher quality than ever before. These advances, such as the process developed by Henry Cort in the 1780s, greatly encouraged the use of machinery in other industries.

Iron was so durable that it became the preferred metal for tools and equipment until displaced by steel after 1860. Britain had iron ores but lacked a process to produce iron in quantity until in 1760 John Smeaton invented a blast furnace that could smelt iron both quickly and cheaply. His invention used an air-blast produced by a fan run by a waterwheel. In 1783, Henry Cort introduced the puddling, or reverberatory furnace, in which the final product was a pasty solid instead of a liquid. It was rolled into balls, squeezed and rolled to eliminate the impurities, or slag. The result was malleable iron in large quantities. The greatest of the early ironmasters, John Wilkinson (1728–1808) invented new machinery to process the iron. In 1779, the first cast-iron bridge was constructed across the Severn; in 1790 the first iron ship was launched. By 1830, Britain was producing 700,000 tons of iron a year; the amount quadrupled a quarter-century later, with centers in Scotland, South Wales, and Staffordshire. Railway builders were the chief customer. In 1847–48 they bought 3 million tons for rolling stock, bridge building, and station building for 2000 new miles, plus the demands of the 3000 previously built miles of railway.

== Germany between the wars ==
After the war, Germany was supposed to pay all of the war reparations according to the Treaty of Versailles. The policy angered the Germans and caused deep resentment, especially of the sort that the Nazis capitalized upon. However the sums actually paid were not large, and were financed by loans from New York in the Dawes Plan. Payments ended in 1931, but in the 1950s West Germany did pay all the reparations. There was an overwhelming inflation in 1923 caused by the government's pumping out paper money. The reconstruction period was based on private investment and demand. When the stock market crashed in 1929, the investors who had been financing Germany pulled out, crippling its economy as unemployment soared to 25%.

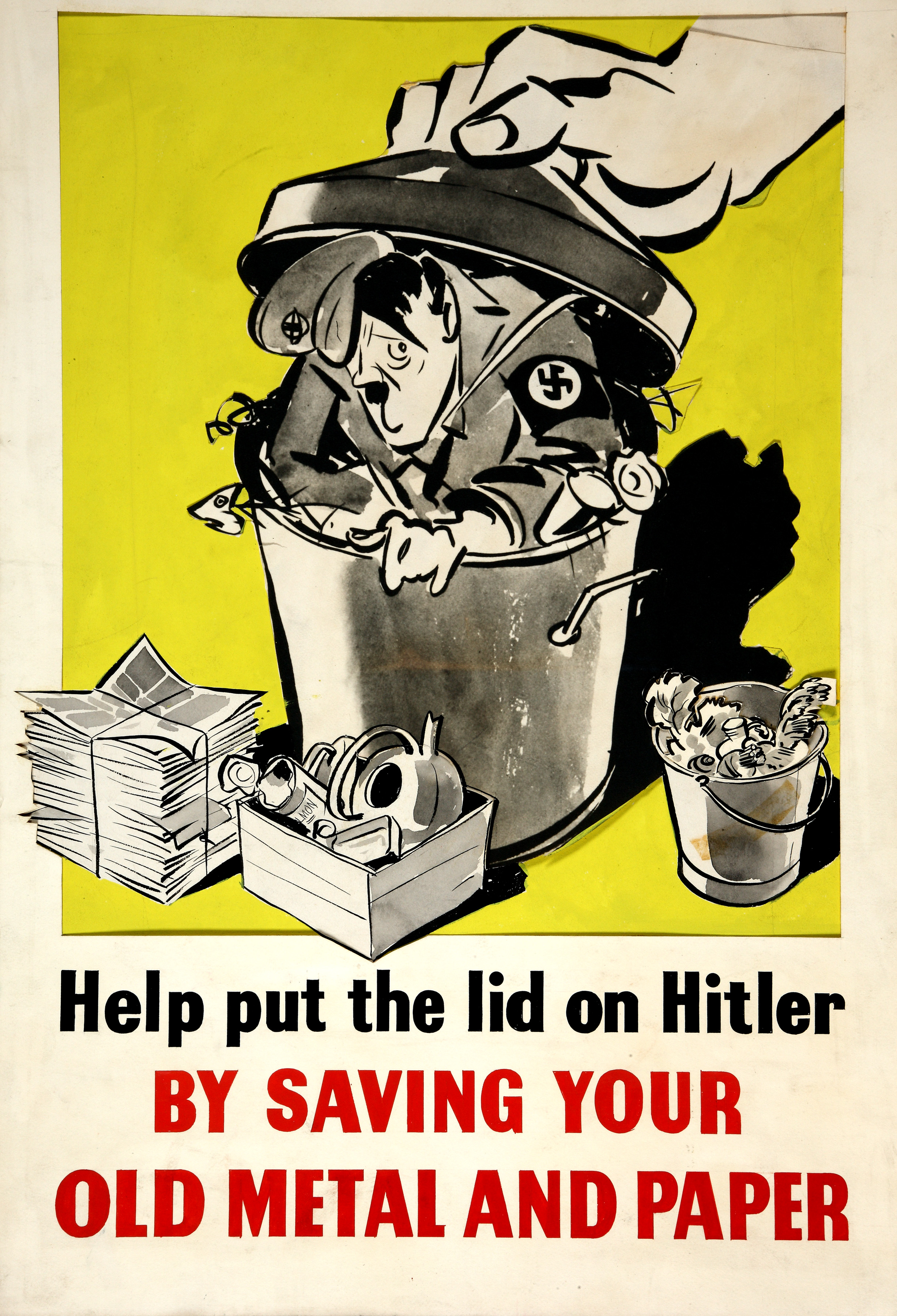
Salvage – Help put the lid on Hitler by saving your old metal and paper

== World War II ==
The home front covers the activities of the civilians in a nation at war. World War II was a total war that was ultimately decided in the factories and workplaces of the Allies of World War II, which had a much better performance than the Axis powers. Indeed, Germany and Japan depended as much or more on plunder of conquered territories than they did on their own production. Life on the home front during World War II was a significant part of the war effort for all participants and had a major impact on the outcome of the war. Governments became involved with new issues such as rationing, manpower allocation, home defense, evacuation in the face of air raids, and response to occupation by an enemy power. The morale and psychology of the people responded to leadership and propaganda. Typically women were mobilized to an unprecedented degree. The success in mobilizing economic output was a major factor in supporting combat operations. All of the powers involved had learned from their experiences on the Home front during World War I and tried to use its lessons and avoid its possible sources of error. The home front engaged in several activities to help the British army and navy, including taking down metal fences and gates to replace them with stone or wood. The metal was then melted down, and used for battle ships or planes.

The major powers devoted 50–61 percent of their total GDP to munitions production. The Allies produced about three times as much in munitions as the Axis powers.

Munitions Production in World War II (Expenditures in billions of dollars, US 1944 munitions prices)
Country/Alliance	Year						
Country/Alliance	1935–39 ave	1940	1941	1942	1943	1944	Total 1939–44
U.S.	0.3	1.5	4.5	20.0	38.0	42.0	106.3
Britain	0.5	3.5	6.5	9.0	11.0	11.0	41.5
U.S.S.R.	1.6	5.0	8.5	11.5	14.0	16.0	56.6
Allies Total	2.4	10.0	20.0	41.5	64.5	70.5	204.4
Germany	2.4	6.0	6.0	8.5	13.5	17.0	53.4
Japan	0.4	1.0	2.0	3.0	4.5	6.0	16.9
Axis Total	2.8	7.0	8.0	11.5	18.0	23.0	70.3

Source: Goldsmith data in Harrison (1988) p. 172

Real Value Consumer Spending
Country	Year							
Country	1937	1939	1940	1941	1942	1943	1944	1945
Japan	100	107	109	111	108	99	93	78
Germany	100	108	117	108	105	95	94	85
US	100	96	103	108	116	115	118	122

Source: Jerome B Cohen, Japan's Economy in War and Reconstruction (1949) p. 354

== Post–World War II ==
=== Marshall Plan ===
The Marshall Plan (officially the European Recovery Program or ERP) was a system of American economic aid to Western Europe 1948–51. It played a major role in the economic recovery, modernization, and unification of Europe. In three years the ERP gave away $12.4 billion (about 5% of the 1948 American GDP of $270 billion) for modernizing the economic and financial systems and rebuilding the industrial and human capital of war-torn Europe, including Britain, Germany, France, Italy and smaller nations. It required each government to set up a national economic plan, and for the countries to cooperate in terms of financial and trade flows. The money was not a loan and there was no repayment. Washington spent such vast sums because it was believed to be cheaper than the rearmament that isolationism or rollback would entail. In the long run, the logic went, a prosperous Europe would be more peaceful, and would make its main trading partner, the US, more prosperous. Stalin refused to allow any of his satellites to participate, the plan became exclusive to western Europe. However, the US extended a similar financial aid program to Japan at the same time.

Historians reject the idea that it only miraculously revived Europe, since the evidence shows that a general recovery was already under way thanks to other aid programs, chiefly from the United States. Bradford De Long and Barry Eichengreen conclude it was, " History's Most Successful Structural Adjustment Program." They state:

It was not large enough to have significantly accelerated recovery by financing investment, aiding the reconstruction of damaged infrastructure, or easing commodity bottlenecks. We argue, however, that the Marshall Plan did play a major role in setting the stage for post-World War II Western Europe's rapid growth. The conditions attached to Marshall Plan aid pushed European political economy in a direction that left its post World War II "mixed economies" with more "market" and less "controls" in the mix.

Historians also emphasize its political impact. The powerful combination of ERP and NATO (1949) gave Europe the assurance of America's commitment to the security and prosperity of Western Europe, and helped the recipients avoid the pessimism and despair that characterized the aftermath of World War I. The Marshall Plan thus created in Europe an unstoppable "revolution of rising expectations," the striking phrase coined in 1950 by Harlan Cleveland, an economist and senior ERP official.

=== European Coal and Steel Community ===
Six European nations, Belgium, France, Germany, Italy, Luxembourg, and the Netherlands took a step toward economic integration with the formation of a common market of coal and steel. They formed the European Coal and Steel Community in 1951. The idea was to stream-line coal and steel production. A side-benefit would be economic interdependence. Thereby, there would be less risk of Economic warfare or even a shooting war between the member nations.

=== Industrial decline ===
The decades from the 1960s saw an economic decline in the output of the more developed nations of Europe, particularly in France and the UK. These nations' positions in output of refined raw materials, e.g. steel, and in finished goods fell in contrast to Asian countries. Several Asian nations made use of comparative advantage and specialized in producing certain goods, utilizing comparably cheaper labor forces. First this occurred in Japan and the four "Asian Tigers" (South Korea, Taiwan, Hong Kong and Singapore); by the latter half of the 1980s the shift of industrial production began occurring in the newly industrializing countries. First, the shift occurred in cheaper, lower technology products, such as textiles. Then, this shift occurred in higher-technology goods, such "durables" as refrigerators or automobiles. The shift of international industrial production out of Europe is a key outcome of globalization.

== The euro ==
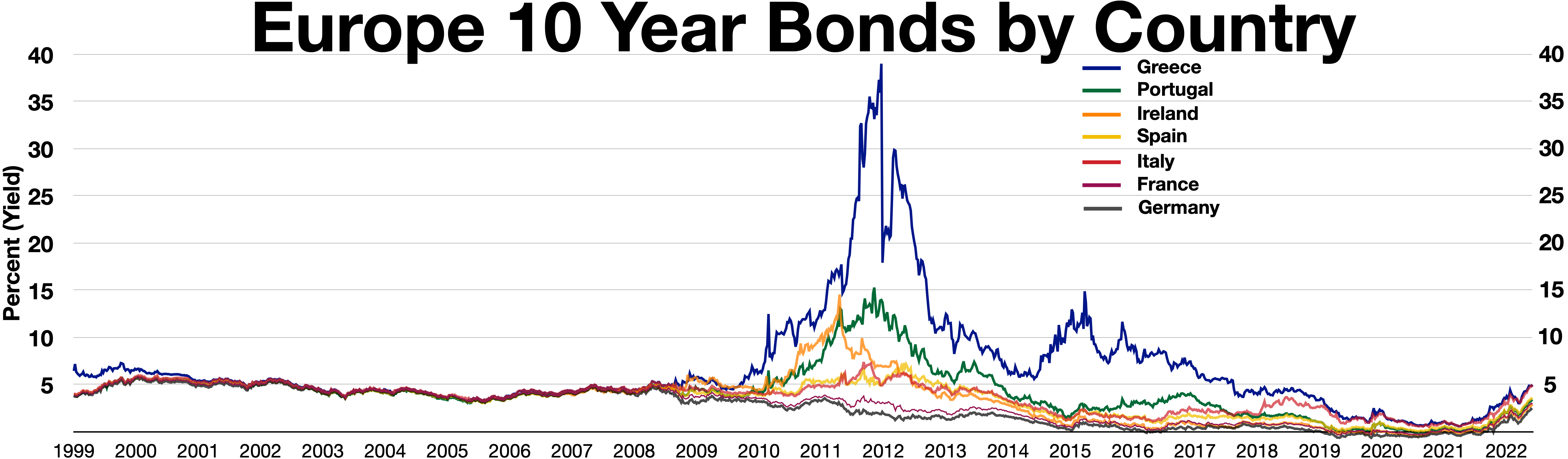
European 10 year bonds, before the Great Recession in Europe bonds floated together in parity Greece Portugal Ireland Spain Italy France Germany

=== Introduction ===
The euro became the official currency of certain European Union members on January 1, 2001. The currency was signed into effect in 1992 in the Treaty of Maastricht. The initial idea behind the euro was that it eliminates exchange rates between European nations and makes currency fluctuation risks minimal.

=== Countries involved ===
The nations involved in the initial treaty were Austria, Belgium, Finland, France, Germany, Greece, Ireland, Italy, Luxembourg, the Netherlands, Portugal, and Spain. These nations agreed in principle to the European Monetary Union (EMU) in 1999 and installed the euro as its currency on January 1, 2001. More European countries agreed to join the union in the following years; Slovenia (2007), Cyprus and Malta (2008), and Slovakia (2009), followed by the Baltic countries (Estonia 2011, Latvia 2014, Lithuania 2015), then Croatia (2023) and Bulgaria (2026). Countries are only allowed to begin using the euro when they have met certain requirements set about by the EMU. The criteria includes "a low and stable inflation, exchange rate stability and sound public finances". The reason for such criteria is because the best way to achieve a successful economy is by ensuring price stability.

== See also ==
- Economic history of Africa
- Economic history of the United Kingdom
- Economic history of France
- Economic history of Germany
- Economic history of Greece and the Greek world
- Economic history of Italy
- Economic history of the Netherlands (1500–1815)
- Economic history of Portugal
- Economic history of Russia
- Economic history of Scotland
- Economic history of Spain
- Economic history of Sweden
- Economic history of Venice
- Economic history of the world
- Economic history of World War I
- Economy of Europe
- History of economic thought
- Price revolution
- Social history
