= Fadesa =

Spanish real estate company

Fadesa Inmobiliaria, S.A.
- Type: Sociedad Anónima
- Traded as: BMAD: FAD
- Industry: Real estate
- Founded: A Coruña, Spain (24 July 1980)
- Founder: Manuel Jove
- Defunct: 17 December 2007
- Fate: Acquired by Martinsa
- Successor: Martinsa Fadesa
- Headquarters: A Coruña, Spain
- Area served: Spain, Portugal, Morocco, Hungary, Poland
- Key people: Manuel Jove, Chairman; Antonio de la Morena Pardo, CEO

Fadesa Inmobiliaria, S.A. was one of the biggest housebuilders of Spain.

In 2007, the company was the subject of a friendly takeover by rival Martinsa for 4 billion euros. resulting in the creation of Martinsa-Fadesa. Only a year later, in July 2008 and during the 2008 financial crisis, the company went into administration, with a debt above 5.2 billion. In 2015, a liquidation plan was approved, when the company's debt reached 7 billion and its equity was -6.5 billion.

== History ==
Fadesa was established on 24 July 1980 by Manuel Jove as Edificaciones Coruñesas, S.A. On the 31 October 1997, Edificaciones Coruñesas bought Urbanizador Inmobiliaria Fadese, S.A.U., Indelar S.A.U., and Coditecsa, S.L.U. adopting the corporate name of one of these companies - Urbanizadora Inmobiliaria Fadese, S.A. (Fadesa).

On 23 April 1999 Urbanizadora Inmobiliaria Fadese changed their name to Fadesa Inmobiliaria, S.A. That year the company reported sales of 135 million euros and profits of 13.7 million, becoming the 5th largest developer of Spain, below bank-owned Urbis, Metrovacesa or Colonial, but above private competitors Prasa, Procisa and Barada.

On 30 April 2004 at the height of the Spanish property bubble, Fadesa floated 33% of its capital on the Madrid Stock Exchange with the company valued between 1.2 and 1.4 billion euros.

In 2006, year before Martinsa's takeover, Fadesa reported sales of 1.3 billion euros, an EBITDA of 360 million and a profit after tax of 230 million euros.

== Sponsorship ==
From 2001 to 2008 Fadesa was the shirt sponsor of the Spanish football club Deportivo de La Coruña. They also sponsored Intervíu Fadesa (futsal), Ayamonte CF (football) and Ceuta-Fadesa (sailing).

== See also ==
- Spanish property bubble
- Grupo14
