= Jesús Samper =

Jesús Samper Vidal (28 August 1950 – 18 December 2015) was a Spanish businessman and lawyer with holdings in many cities, as well as being the owner of the football team Real Murcia. He was born in Madrid and died there.
