= Martinsa-Fadesa =

Former Spanish construction firm

Martinsa-Fadesa, S.A.
- Company type: Sociedad Anonima
- Traded as: BMAD: MTF
- Industry: Real estate; Hospitality
- Founded: Madrid, Spain (20 November 1991)
- Founder: Fernando Martín
- Defunct: 2018
- Fate: Liquidated
- Headquarters: A Coruña, Spain; Madrid, Spain
- Key people: Fernando Martín, Chairman; Carlos Vela, CEO
- Revenue: €1.202 billion (2007)
- Operating income: ▼ (€20.0 million) (2007)
- Net income: ▲€65.9 million (2007)
- Total equity: ▼€2,795,754 (2011)
- Number of employees: 3,607 (2007)
- Subsidiaries: Construcciones Pórtico; Town Planning Consultores; Fercler; Jafemafe; Inomar; Inmobiliaria Marplus
- Website: www.martinsafadesa.com

Martinsa-Fadesa, S.A. was one of the main housebuilding groups in Spain before the crash of the Spanish property bubble. It was based in Madrid, Spain.

In 2007, Promociones y Urbanizaciones Martín, S.A. (Martinsa), a small developer that in 2006 reported sales of 90 million euros, merged with Fadesa Inmobiliaria, S.A. (Fadesa), one of the biggest hosebuilders with revenues of 1.3 billion, to create Martinsa-Fadesa. The company went in to administration on 15 July 2008 after failing to pay off debts.

== History ==
Fadesa was founded at the end of the 1970s in A Coruña. It specialized in the development of great projects of protected house. In 1993, its activity outside Galicia begun, initially in Castile and León and then in the rest of communities of Spain. At the moment, the firm is present all over the Spanish territory through twenty delegations and more than fifty points of sale.

In 1999, Fadesa expanded internationally for the first time, entering the Portuguese market, and in 2000 it opened its delegation in Morocco. At the international level, it participates in projects like the touristic resort of Saīdia, Morocco with a surface of 300,000 square meters. It is also present in a few Eastern European countries such as Hungary and Romania.

At the end of 2006 Fadesa achieved sales of €1.281 billion.

On December 14, 2007 Fadesa merged with Martinsa, a small housebuilder that in 2006 reported sales of 90 million. Although it's net assets had increased from 32 to 303 million in said year, the auditor's report mentioned that it was due to a capital increase of 0.4 million with a premium of 234 million euros through a loan conversion and therefore it's net assets should have been reduced by said amount down to 69 million. Therefore, Martinsa's total assets were 296 million against the 4.4 billion reported by Fadesa in 2006.

=== Financial difficulties ===
In 2007 Martinsa-Fadesa sold 36% less houses than in 2006, and its debt increased to €5.153 billion due to the crash of the Spanish property bubble. On July 14, 2008 Martinsa-Fadesa failed to acquire an additional €150 million in credit to renegotiate €4 billion of its debt. The company lost 70% of its stock value in two days and was advocated to file for bankruptcy in Spain's biggest ever corporate default. The firm subsequently presented a labor force adjustment plan which would result in the loss of 23% of its employees.

In March 2015, the company filed for bankruptcy, holding assets worth €2.4 billion ($2.7 billion) with debts worth €7.0 billion, making its collapse one of the biggest bankruptcies in Spanish history. Trade of the company stocks were abruptly suspended, leaving no chance for its investors to unload them. The liquidation of the company started the following month. The company was banned from trading on the stock exchange in October 2015. In July 2018, Martinsa-Fadesa entered the final phase of liquidation. The website martinsafadesaliquidacion.es was set up to follow the liquidation process. In November 2018, in the aftermath of the crash, the lawyer Antonia Magdaleno was found responsible for the company's debt and sentenced to 4 years in jail.

== Operations ==
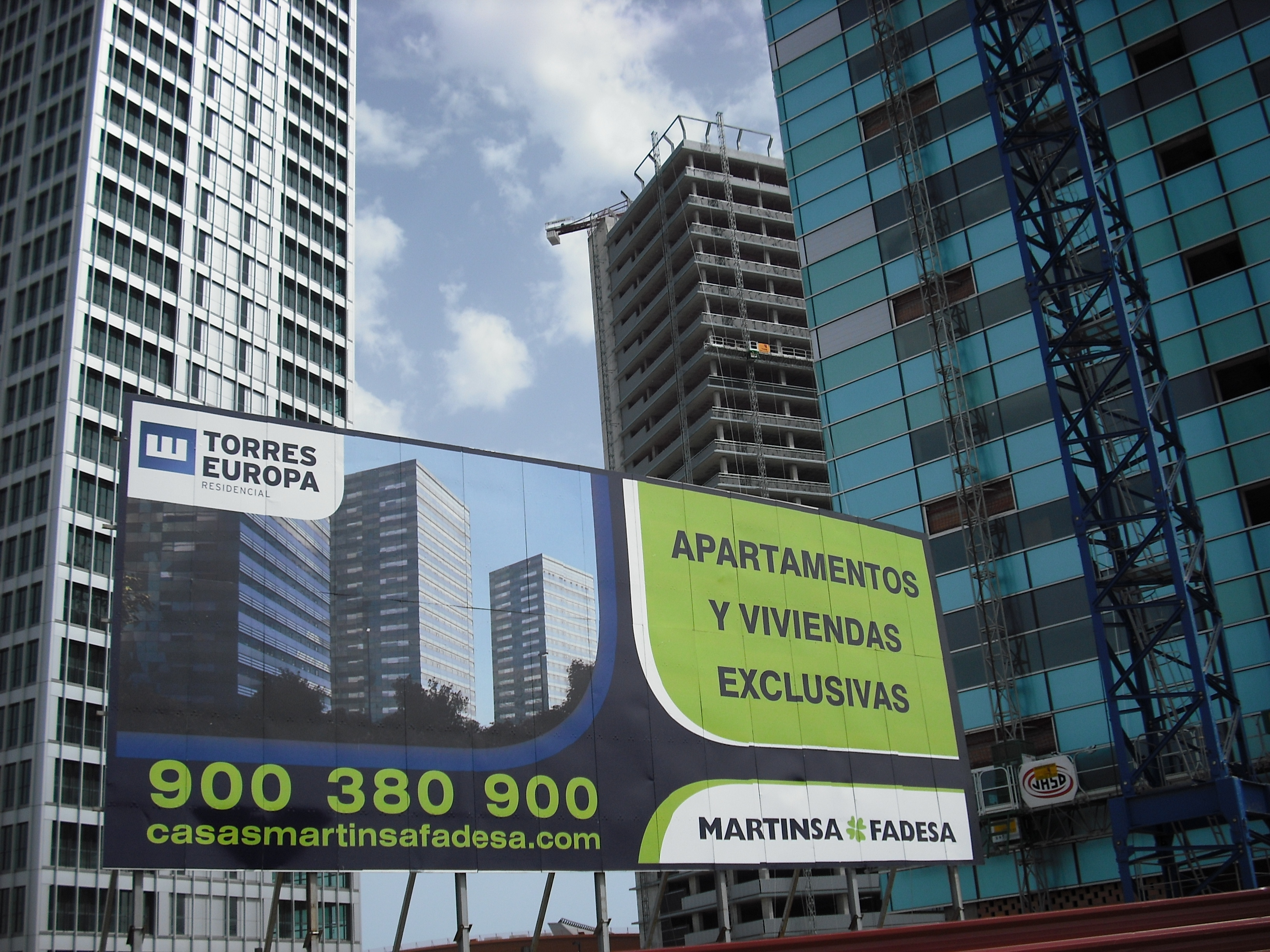
Buildings under construction by Martinsa-Fadesa at L'Hospitalet de Llobregat

Martinsa-Fadesa had two main divisions — real estate and asset management. Real estate is the traditional division through which it engages in the promotion of all types of homes, whether as a first or second residence. Asset management develops basically hotel projects and golf courses. It retains the ownership of the asset and outsource the operation to a specialized third party.

== Sponsorship ==
The company was the official sponsor of Spanish football club Deportivo La Coruña from 2001 to 2008.
